= R546 (South Africa) =

Regional route in South Africa

Regional route R546

Route information
- Length: 122.3 km (76.0 mi)

Major junctions
- South end: R34 at Vrede
- R23 / R39 / R50 at Standerton; N17 near Kinross
- North end: R29 / R547 in Kinross

Location
- Country: South Africa
- Major cities: Vrede, Standerton, Charl Cilliers, eMbalenhle, Evander, Kinross

Highway system
- Numbered routes of South Africa
← R545	→ R547

The R546 is a Regional Route in South Africa that connects Kinross with Vrede via Evander and Standerton.

== Route ==
Its northern terminus is in Kinross, Mpumalanga, at a junction with the R29. It is initially co-signed with the R547 southwards for 850 metres before the R547 becomes its own road to the south-south-west, while the R546 heads south. Just after, it crosses the N17 highway. It passes by Evander, where it meets the south-western terminus of the R580 road from Secunda.

From Evander, it goes southwards for 54 km, passing through the township of Embalenhle and the village of Charl Cilliers, to Standerton. Here, it meets the south-eastern terminus of the R50 from Pretoria/Delmas and the south-western terminus of the R39 from Ermelo. After meeting the R50 and R39, it goes south through the Standerton Central Business District as Walter Sisulu Drive to intersect with the R23 road coming from Heidelberg. The R546 and R23 become one road southwards as Walter Sisulu Drive, then south-east as Nelson Mandela Drive, to cross the Vaal River into the suburb of Meyerville, where the R546 becomes its own road south-west as George Street while the R23 remains on the south-easterly road.

The R546 continues southwards for 56 km, crossing into the Free State, to enter the town of Vrede, where the route ends at an intersection with the R34.
