= R50 (South Africa) =

Road in South Africa

Provincial route R50

Route information
- Maintained by GDRT and MDPWRT
- Length: 59.7 km (37.1 mi)

Major junctions
- Northwest end: N1 in Pretoria
- R25 / R51 in Bapsfontein; N12 near Delmas; R42 in Delmas; R29 in Leandra; N17 near Leandra; R39 in Standerton
- Southeast end: R23 in Standerton

Location
- Country: South Africa
- Major cities: Pretoria; Bapsfontein; Delmas; Leandra; Standerton

Highway system
- Numbered routes of South Africa
← R49	→ R51

The R50 is a provincial route in South Africa that connects Pretoria with Standerton via Delmas and Leandra.

== Route ==
Detailed Route

=== Gauteng ===
The R50 begins in Pretoria, Tshwane (Administrative Capital of South Africa) near the suburbs of Erasmusrand and Waterkloof Ridge, at an intersection with the N1 Danie Joubert Freeway (Pretoria Eastern Bypass). North of the freeway, it is designated as the M9 metropolitan route and named Rigel Avenue. It begins as Delmas Road and heads south-east, passing through Erasmuskloof and meeting the M10 metropolitan route (Solomon Mahlangu Drive) before passing in-between Wingate Park and Elardus Park and becoming the eastern border of the Rietvlei Nature Reserve. The R50 heads south-east to Bapsfontein, Ekurhuleni. The distance from the N1 intersection in Pretoria to Bapsfontein is 30 km.

Upon entering Bapsfontein, the R50 meets the R25 route from Kempton Park. They are cosigned as one road up to the four-way junction of Bapsfontein, where they meet the northern terminus of the R51 route from Daveyton/Springs. As the R25 becomes the road to the north-east at that junction towards Bronkhorstspruit, the R50 remains as the south-easterly road.

=== Mpumalanga ===
The R50 runs another 30 km to the town of Delmas, crossing the border between Gauteng and Mpumalanga. Just before entering Delmas, the R50 meets the N12 freeway between Johannesburg and Witbank. In Delmas, the R50 meets the R42 route from Bronkhorstspruit. They are one road for the next 5 km south-east, intersecting with the R555 road during this time.

South of Delmas, The R42 becomes its own road, heading south-west towards Nigel, Gauteng, leaving the R50 as the south-easterly road. The road continues east-south-east. After meeting the R580, the R50 turns directly south towards the town of Leandra. The journey from Delmas to Leandra is 45 km.

In Leandra, the R50 intersects with the R29 road in Leandra Central and the N17 highway about 3 kilometres south of the town centre (both roads coming from Springs and Johannesburg in the west and Kinross in the east). The R50 journeys another 80 km south-east, intersecting with the R547 road near Brendan Village (staggered junction; cosigned for a few kilometres), to the town of Standerton.

In Standerton, the R50 reaches its south-eastern terminus by meeting the passing R546 route from Evander, the passing R23 route from Heidelberg and the south-western terminus of the R39 route from Ermelo.

== Bapsfontein Sinkhole ==
In October 2019, a sinkhole developed on the R50 approximately 6 km before the intersection with the R25 coming from Kempton Park, affecting both sides of the road. By November 2021, the sinkhole had not yet been resolved by the road agencies.

The Democratic Alliance reported on 6 March 2025 that the road has been reopened by the Gauteng Department of Roads and Transport.
