= Battle of Bakenlaagte =

1901 battle of the Second Boer War

- Part of the Second Boer War
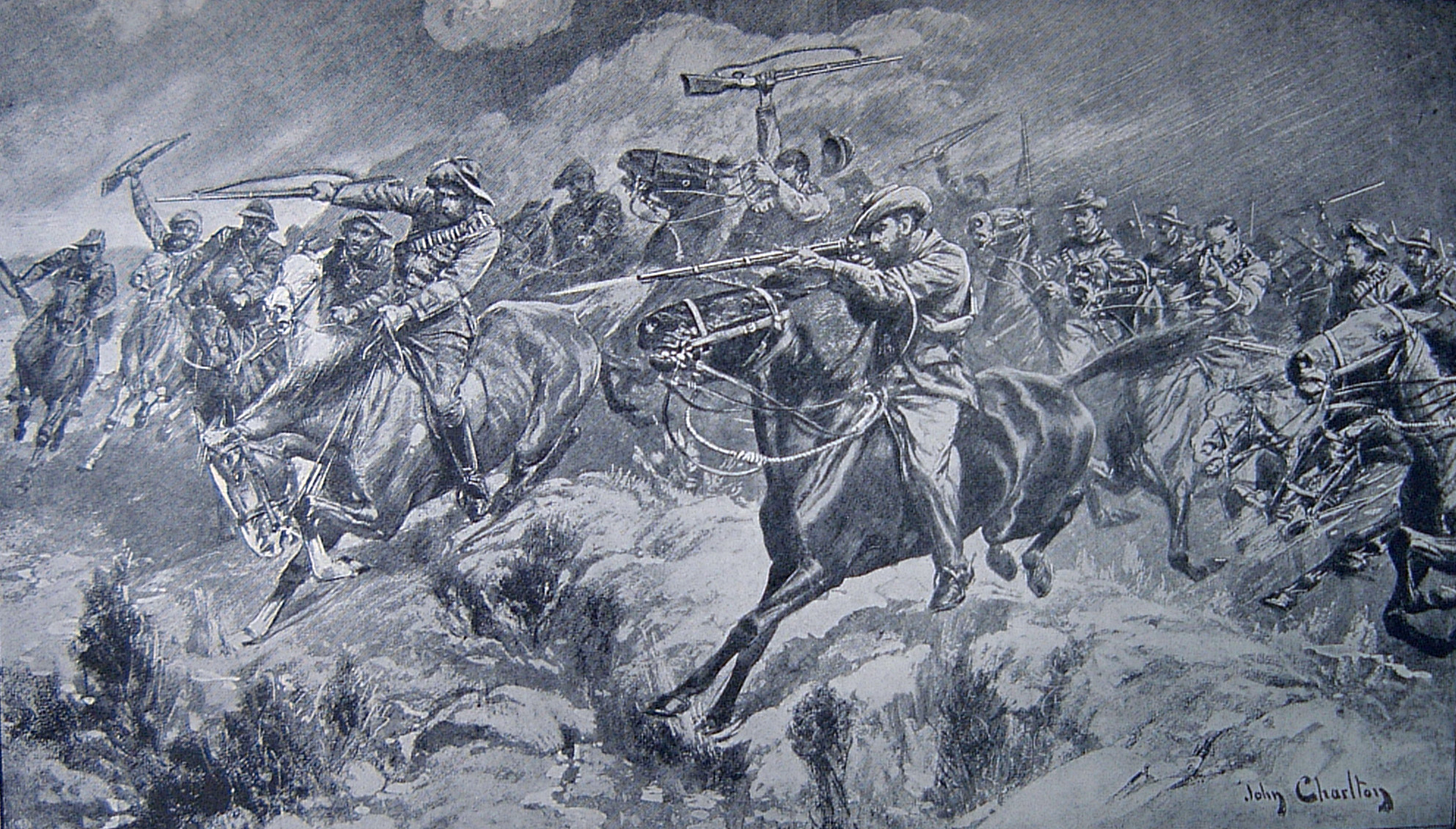
- Boer charge at Bakenlaagte
Date	30 October 1901
Location	Bakenlaagte 26°20′51.05″S 29°8′1.04″E
Result	Boer Victory

Belligerents
United Kingdom	South African Republic; Orange Free State

Commanders and leaders
(United Kingdom) Colonel G. E. Benson	(South African Republic) General Louis Botha

Strength
210	900

Casualties and losses
73 killed 134 wounded	Approximately 14 killed, including General Daniel Opperman; 48 wounded

The Battle of Bakenlaagte in Eastern Transvaal, South Africa, occurred on 30 October 1901 during the guerrilla phase of Anglo-Boer war of 1899–1902. The battle saw the Eastern Transvaal Boer commandos of Generals Johan Grobler, Coen Brits, Piet Viljoen and Louis Botha attack the rearguard of Colonel Benson's much feared No. 3 Flying Column while it was in marching formation to its base camp. On the Boer side general Daniel Opperman was killed in the engagement. The Bakenlaagte battlefield is located on the Kriel-Kinross road at the intersection of the R547 and R580 roads in Mpumalanga Province, just south of Matla Power Station.

== Battle ==
=== Background ===
Lieutenant Colonel George Elliott Benson's British No. 3 Flying Column, comprising 2000 men, specialised in night raids that were terrorising Boer Commandos on the highveld. It had become so successful that General Botha ordered all available Boer forces to accumulate at Bakenlaagte so as to attack Benson.

The No. 3 Flying Column, consisting of mostly the 1st and 2nd Coldstreams, was marching back to a refit station after performing farm clearing operations. Rainy and misty weather had reduced visibility and made the going difficult which caused the marching British column to become spread out into clusters of troops. The column force became further extended when Benson began to deploy small detachments of mounted men and infantry to suppress small Boer sniping teams that were roaming around the marching column.

=== Engagement ===
General Botha arrived with about 800 reinforcements after riding about 40 kilometres (25 mi) without stopping, on arrival, Botha observed that the strung-out column provided an ideal opportunity for an overwhelming force to roll up the isolated and spread-out groups of Commonwealth troops piecemeal and immediately ordered a large Boer force of mounted men to attack the small isolated rearguard of the column.

Outnumbered four to one, the column's rearguard of 210 Commonwealth troops set up a defensive position on Gun Hill and fought about 900 Boers in a close-quarter twenty-minute gun fight that ended only when the column rearguard was annihilated.

Great bravery was demonstrated by the men on both sides, with combined casualties numbering approximately 87 killed with 182 wounded. Colonel Benson (a veteran of the Battle of Magersfontein, 11 December 1899) was to die the next morning from wounds received on the field of battle.

=== Aftermath ===
This rearguard action allowed the main column time to deploy and set up a defensive perimeter under Lt Colonel Wools-Sampson. This deployment prevented the attacking Boer forces from riding on and capturing the main column as originally planned. The Boers left the field with whatever spoils they could carry, and the British carried in the wounded to the entrenched camp during the night.

The 73 dead Commonwealth troops were buried on Gun Hill but later reinterred in Primrose Cemetery, corner of Cemetery Road and Beaconsfield Road, Germiston, in the 1960s. Lt Colonel Benson's grave is located at 26°11′45.20″S 28°8′46.05″E. Some of the white granite graves have been vandalised and the brass letters on Colonel Benson's granite grave have been stolen.

== Literature ==
- Grobler, Jackie (J.E.H.) (2004). The War Reporter : the Anglo-Boer War through the eyes of the burghers. Johannesburg: Jonathan Ball Publishers. ISBN 978-1-86842-186-2. OCLC 56776191.
- Pakenham, Thomas (1979). The Boer War. London: Weidenfeld & Nicolson. p. 536. ISBN 029777395X. OCLC 905293995.
- Smith, Robin (June 2019), "Bakenlaagte 30 October 1901", Military History Journal, 18 (4), The South African Military History Society / Die Suid-Afrikaanse Krygshistoriese Vereniging.
- Willsworth, Clive (2006). Bakenlaagte - The Story (2nd ed.). Just Done Productions. ISBN 978-1-920169-20-6.
- www.up.ac.za/dspace/bitstream/2263/12638/6/003_p50-99.pdf bakenlaagte
