= R29 (South Africa) =

Road in South Africa

Provincial route R29

Route information
- Maintained by GDRT and MDPWRT
- Length: 127.4 km (79.2 mi)

Major junctions
- From: R41 in Johannesburg
- R21 in Boksburg; R23 in Benoni; R51 in Springs; R42 near Springs; R50 near Leandra
- To: N17 near Evander

Location
- Country: South Africa
- Major cities: Johannesburg, Germiston, Boksburg, Benoni, Springs, Devon, Leandra, Kinross, Evander

Highway system
- Numbered routes of South Africa
← R28	→ R30

The R29 is a provincial route in South Africa that connects Johannesburg with Leandra and Kinross via Germiston, Boksburg, Benoni and Springs. For much of its route it is named Main Reef Road. The R29 used to end near the Golela border post with Eswatini, however the section from Evander to Ermelo is now part of the N17 (prior to construction of the N17 extension from Leandra to Evander, the N17 followed the alignment of R29 from Leandra; however, the extension of the N17 highway has resulted in the old section of the road being given to R29) and the section from Ermelo to the Golela border post just after Pongola is now part of the N2.

From Springs to the R580 junction north of Evander, the R29 is parallel to the N17 highway.

== Route ==
Detailed Route

=== Gauteng ===
The R29 begins in Johannesburg, Gauteng, at a junction with the R41 road (Main Reef Road) in the Westgate suburb adjacent to the Johannesburg CBD, as Marshall Street eastwards and Anderson Street westwards (one-way streets). The R29 continues eastwards as John Page Street by way of a right turn after the Jeppestown suburb. Shortly after, it becomes Main Reef Road. After Cleveland, the route continues by way of a right turn at Kraft Road to fly over the N3/N12 highway (Johannesburg Eastern Bypass), where it leaves Johannesburg and enters Germiston in the City of Ekurhuleni Metropolitan Municipality.

At Primrose (north of Germiston Central), the R29 continues by way of a right turn at Shamrock Road, where it meets the M37 metropolitan route and the southern terminus of the M57 metropolitan route. At the next junction, the R29 continues eastwards by way of a left turn towards Boksburg. At Boksburg North, it intersects with the R21 and continues as Cason Road (forming the northern boundary of the Boksburg CBD) up to its junction with the M43 road, where it enters Benoni. Through Benoni Central, It is Princess Avenue eastwards and Ampthill Avenue westwards (one-way streets) (meeting the R23 route during this time), up to the Kleinfontein suburb, where it is named Main Reef Road again and proceeds by way of a right turn to reach a junction with the M45 metropolitan route, which it becomes cosigned with southwards. After Mackenzie Park, north of Brakpan, the R29 becomes its own road eastwards while the M45 continues southwards to Brakpan Central. Just after, the R29 continues by a right turn at Modder Road eastwards.

By Kingsway (south of Daveyton), the R29 joins the R51 road (Kingsway Road) southwards for 5 km before splitting in the vicinity of Springs (at 4th Avenue). The R29 continues eastwards and meets the south-western terminus of the R555 (Welgedacht Road) in the Old Springs suburb before becoming two one-way streets southwards (3rd Street and 4th Street) and two one-way streets eastwards (1st Avenue and 2nd Avenue) before becoming one street eastwards.

From Springs, the R29 makes a 38 km journey eastwards to Devon, intersecting with the R42 midway between Springs and Devon. From Devon, it continues eastwards for 16 km to leave Gauteng and reach the town of Leandra in the Mpumalanga Province. The R29 is parallel to the N17 national route from Springs to Leandra. (Also used as an alternative and backup route when the N17 highway has issues)

=== Mpumalanga ===
The R29 used to end in Leandra by the R50 road junction, with the road continuing eastwards being part of the N17 national route (The N17 formed a Z-Shape in Leandra, Cosigned with the R50 up to this junction before turning eastwards). But Today, the N17 East is now a continuous straight Highway from its primary junction with the R50 south of Leandra, letting the continuous road from the R29 & R50 junction eastwards also remain with the R29 designation.

The R29 remains following and being an alternative route to the N17 highway up to a point north-east of Evander and north-west of Secunda. From the R50 junction in Leandra, the R29 journeys eastwards for 20 km to the town of Kinross (North of Evander), where it meets the R547 road. After Kinross, it goes for another 10 km eastwards to mark its end at a point north-west of Secunda, known as the Leven Station Junction, where it meets the R580 road and the N17 highway.
