= R547 (South Africa) =

Regional route in South Africa

Regional route R547

Major junctions
- North end: R555 near Ogies
- R544 near Thubelihle; R545 at Kriel; R580 near Kinross; R29 / R546 at Kinross; R50 near Brendan Village
- South end: R23 near Greylingstad

Location
- Country: South Africa

Highway system
- Numbered routes of South Africa
← R546	→ R548

The R547 is a Regional Route in Mpumalanga, South Africa.

== Route ==
Its northern terminus is an intersection with the R555 south-west of Witbank and east of Ogies, just south of the R555's intersection with the N12. It heads eastwards to reach Coalville, where it turns southwards. It then reaches a four-way intersection, where it meets the R544. They switch roads, with the R544 becoming the south-easterly road and the R547 becoming the south-westerly road. From that intersection, the R547 proceeds to pass through Kriel, where it meets the R545 at a staggered intersection. Continuing south-west, it intersects with the R580 before reaching Kinross. Here, it crosses the R29, thereafter being cosigned briefly with the R546. They diverge just before meeting the N17, with the R547 again heading south-west. It crosses the R50 at a staggered junction, before reaching its southern terminus at an intersection with the R23 between Greylingstad and Standerton.
