= R580 (South Africa) =

Regional route in South Africa

Regional route R580

Route information
- Length: 50 km (31 mi)

Major junctions
- North-west end: R50 north of Leandra
- R547; R29 / N17 near Secunda
- South-east end: R546 in Evander

Location
- Country: South Africa

Highway system
- Numbered routes of South Africa
← R579	→ R600

The R580 is a Regional Route in Mpumalanga, South Africa that connects the R50 north of Leandra with Secunda and Evander.

== Route ==
The R580 begins at a junction with the R50 approximately 15 kilometres north of Leandra (28 kilometres south-east of Delmas). It runs eastwards for 21 kilometres to reach a junction just before Matla Power Station, where it turns to the south. It heads for 8 kilometres to reach a junction with the R547. It continues southwards for 12 kilometres to reach the Leven Station interchange, where it meets the eastern terminus of the R29 and crosses the N17 Highway. It continues south for 4 kilometres to reach a junction just north-west of the industrial town of Secunda (west of Trichardt), where it turns to the west. It heads for 4 kilometres to end at an intersection with the R546 south of Evander.
