= R39 (South Africa) =

Provincial route in South Africa

Provincial route R39

Route information
- Maintained by MDPWRT
- Length: 88.1 km (54.7 mi)

Major junctions
- West end: R23 in Standerton
- R50 in Standerton; R38 near Standerton; R35 in Morgenzon
- East end: N17 in Ermelo

Location
- Country: South Africa

Highway system
- Numbered routes of South Africa
← R38	→ R40

The R39 is a provincial route in South Africa that connects Standerton with Ermelo. It is a route in the province of Mpumalanga.

== Route ==
Detailed Route

The R39 has its beginnings in Baumann Street, Florapark, northern Standerton, at an intersection with the R50, R23 and R546 routes. It leaves the town in a north-easterly direction with the Grootdraai Dam to its east. Junctioning with the R38 that heads north to Bethal, it continues north-easterly crossing the Blesbokspruit before entering Morgenzon as Steyn Street, bisecting the north-south R35 road in the town. Leaving the town, it continues north-east to Ermelo, ending at a T junction with the N17 (Bethal Road; Joubert Street) west of the town centre.
