= R545 (South Africa) =

Regional route in South Africa

Regional route R545

Route information
- Length: 90 km (56 mi)

Major junctions
- North end: R104 / N4 at Balmoral
- N12 near Ogies; R555 at Ogies; R547 at Kriel
- South end: N17 near Bethal

Location
- Country: South Africa

Highway system
- Numbered routes of South Africa
← R544	→ R546

The R545 is a Regional Route in Mpumalanga, South Africa that connects Balmoral with Bethal via Ogies and Kriel.

== Route ==
Its northern terminus is the R104 at Balmoral in Mpumalanga. It is initially co-signed with the R104 and starts by going southwards from Balmoral to cross the N4 freeway (Maputo Corridor). Just after the N4 interchange, the R104 becomes the road eastwards to Witbank and the R545 remains the road southwards. It runs south-south-east, crossing the N12 freeway to reach Ogies. At Ogies, it meets the R555 at a staggered junction, before leaving the town to the south-east. It passes just south of Kriel where it meets the R547 at a staggered junction. From there it continues south-east to its southern terminus in Bethal at an intersection with the N17.
