= R542 (South Africa) =

Regional route in South Africa

Regional route R542

Route information
- Length: 38 km (24 mi)

Major junctions
- West end: R544 at Vandyksdrif
- R35 near Komati Power Station
- East end: R38 near Hendrina

Location
- Country: South Africa

Highway system
- Numbered routes of South Africa
← R541	→ R543

The R542 is a Regional Route in Mpumalanga, South Africa that connects Rethabile with Hendrina.

== Route ==
Its western terminus is a junction with the R544 at Vandyksdrif (next to Rethabile). It heads east to cross the R35 south of Komati Power Station. It continues east to reach its end at an intersection with the R38 just south-west of Hendrina.
