= R544 (South Africa) =

Regional route in South Africa

Regional route R544

Route information
- Maintained by SANRAL
- Length: 148 km (92 mi)

Major junctions
- South end: R35 near Bethal
- R547 near Thubelihle; R542 near Vandyksdrif; R575; N12 near Witbank; N4 in Witbank; R555 / R104 in Witbank; R25 near Verena
- North end: R573 near Kwaggafontein

Location
- Country: South Africa
- Major cities: Bethal, Witbank

Highway system
- Numbered routes of South Africa
← R543	→ R545

The R544 is a Regional Route in Mpumalanga, South Africa. It connects Bethal with Kwaggafontein via Witbank (eMalahleni) and Verena.

== Route ==
Its begins at an intersection with the R35 approximately 11 kilometres north of Bethal, going north-west. It then intersects at a four-way intersection with the R547 north-east of Kriel. The two routes exchange roads, with the R547 becoming the north-westerly road and the R544 becoming the north-easterly road.

The R544 heads northwards to cross the Olifants River at the town of Vandyksdrif before it intersects with the western terminus of the R542. It continues to intersect with the southern terminus of the R575 and crosses the Olifants River one more time. It continues to cross under the N12 highway and heads into the southern suburbs of Witbank (eMalahleni) as Watermeyer Street. It then proceeds to meet the N4 highway (Maputo Corridor) as OR Tambo Road.

Just after crossing the N4 highway, the R544 becomes Beatty Avenue westwards through the Witbank Town Centre for 3 kilometres up to a junction with the R555 (Walter Sisulu Drive) and the R104 (Diederichs Street) at the Witbank Long-Distance Taxi Rank. Here, the R544 becomes Walter Sisulu Drive northwards. The road leaves Witbank in a north-westerly direction as Carmen Street before heading north and eventually crossing the Wilge River. Then heading north-west, it crosses the R25 at the town of Verena. The road's northern terminus is reached as it ends at a junction with the R573 just south-west of Kwaggafontein.
