= Ciska Jordaan =

South African politician

Ciska Jordaan MP

Member of the National Assembly of South Africa
- Incumbent
- Assumed office 25 June 2024

Personal details
- Born: Ciska Jordaan
- Party: Democratic Alliance
- Spouse: Jonathan Jordaan
- Occupation: Member of Parliament
- Profession: Politician

Ciska Jordaan is a South African politician who has been a Member of the National Assembly of South Africa for the Democratic Alliance (DA) since 2024.

== Background ==
Jordaan was born in Trichardt and grew up in Secunda, Mpumalanga as one of six siblings. She attended Laerskool Goedehoop and Hoërskool Oosterland in Secunda until moving to Saudi Arabia with her family for three years, where she completed her high school education at the American School Dhahran. Upon her return to South Africa in 2010, she attended the University of Pretoria, earning a bachelor's degree in psychology, philosophy, and French.

Jordaan first became active in politics in 2014. She served as a DA councillor on the Govan Mbeki Local Municipality council in Mpumalanga from 2015 until 2022. At 23 years old, she was the youngest member of the DA's caucus on the council when she joined in 2015. She served as the DA's chief whip on the council from 2016 to 2018, and then as the party's caucus leader from 2018 to 2021. She also served as deputy chair of the DA's Mpumalanga branch from 2020 to 2022. She resigned from the council in 2022 to become a leadership development coordinator for the DA, focused on training candidates for office.

== Parliamentary career ==
Jordaan stood as a DA parliamentary candidate on the National list in the 2024 national elections and was subsequently elected to the National Assembly of South Africa. She was sworn in on 25 June 2024 and became a member of the Portfolio Committee on Basic Education.
