= South African potato boycott =

1959 consumer boycott to protest working conditions during apartheid

The potato boycott of 1959 was a consumer boycott in Bethal, South Africa during the Apartheid era against slave-like conditions of potato labourers in Bethal, Transvaal. The boycott started in June 1959 and ended in September 1959. Prominent figures of the movement included Gert Sibande, Ruth First, Michael Scott and Henry Nxumalo.

== Events leading up to potato boycott ==
A participant of the potato boycott in Bethal reported that young boys were taken to potato farms after committing Pass Law offences. Their clothing was taken away, and they were given sacks to wear as clothing. They slept on concrete floors and used their hands to dig the potatoes due to a lack of resources. The boys were beaten with sjamboks by the foremen and many of those who died were buried on the fields without reporting the death to the relatives of the deceased. Community leaders then decided to boycott the potatoes from Bethal farms In the 1940s, a prominent leader Gert Sibande played an important role in organising and revealing the conditions of labourers in Bethal. His findings after going undercover as a potato farmworker in Bethal were revealed in the New Age/The Guardian with assistance from journalist Ruth First and Michael Scott in 1947. In 1952, Drum magazines Henry Nxumalo also published an article reporting unsatisfactory working conditions on Bethal farms. Drum magazine journalists came into contact with a collection of documents and trial cases of beatings that occurred in the 1940s, this also included the case of a worker who had been beaten to death in 1944. Hendrik Frensch Verwoerd dismissed these findings in Parliament and described it as 'a most unjust attack by unwarranted generalisations'.

== Potato boycott ==
After the 1952 Defiance Campaign and the Congress of the People in 1955, the government prohibited most forms of political action and also banned many political leaders. The movement turned to boycotts as a method of resistance. Representatives of the African National Congress (ANC), the South African Congress of Trade Unions, South African Indian Congress (SAIC), South African Coloured Peoples Organisation/SACPO and the Congress of Democrats created a combined body called the Congress Alliance. The Congress Alliance aimed to initiate a boycott strategy in the struggle for equality in South Africa. Consumer boycotts were popular as there was less victimisation compared to other forms of resistance. Other boycotts included the 1957 Alexandra bus boycott, Beer Hall Boycott as well as 'Dipping tanks' which was initiated by women in Natal. On Friday, 26 June 1959 the South African Congress of Trade Unions, launched the national potato boycott in response to the unsatisfactory working conditions of labourers in Bethal in the Eastern Transvaal now known as Mpumalanga. Over 60, 000 people attended the launch of the boycott at Currie's Fountain in Durban. The potato boycott of 1959 is regarded as one of the most successful boycotts supported by the ANC Many people, black and white, started boycotting potatoes, a staple to many people's diets. Setswannung Molefe, an ANC supporter from Alexandra Township in Johannesburg believed that: 'The Boer who farmed with potatoes had the habit of knocking down his 'lazy' labourers with his tractor. He did not bury them, instead, he used them as compost in his potato farm. We convinced that what we heard was true, because even the potatoes themselves were shaped like human beings. They were not completely round. Then we had to boycott potatoes...we argued that eating potatoes was the same as eating human flesh.' Due to the effects of the boycott, the government appointed a Commission of Inquiry into the labourers working conditions. Farmers on potato farms also started improving the conditions of the labourers on their farms. In August 1959 a leaflets were released by the Congress Alliance titled: 'Potato Boycott lifted. A victory for the people. A warning for the farmer.'The boycott was finally called off in September 1959. It gave people confidence to participate in other protests. In 1957, Congress Alliance initiated a mass boycott of nationalist controlled businesses. Products listed included Rembrandt cigarette products, Senator Coffee, Braganza tea, Glenryck canned fish, Neptune canned fish, Laaiplek Farm Feeds and Protea Canned Fish.

== International response ==
The consumer boycotts in South Africa gained international attention from anti-apartheid groups in Britain, Canada, Australia and New Zealand who also started boycotting Rembrandt cigarette products. A British boycott started in the 1950s. Chief Albert Luthuli and Duma Nokwe visited anti-apartheid supporters in London. Chief Luthuli responded to a request from the Boycott Movement for a clear statement endorsing the British boycott. The statement was co-signed by G M Naicker, the president of the South African Indian Congress (SAIC), and Peter Brown of the Liberal Party. It stated: ‘Economic boycott is one way in which the world at large can bring home to the South African authorities that they must mend their ways or suffer for them … This appeal is therefore directed to the people of Great Britain to strike a blow for freedom and justice in South Africa.’ The statement and appeal became the founding statement of the Anti-Apartheid Movement.

== Participants ==
- Gert Sibande
- Ruth First
- Michael Scott
- Florence Mkhize
- Thomas Nkobi
- Frances Baard assisted
- Mary Thipe
- Dorothy Nyembe

== Organisations ==
- ANC
- South African Congress of Trade Unions
- South African Indian Congress
- South African Coloured Peoples Organisation
- Congress of Democrats
- Congress Alliance

== See also ==
- PUTCO
- Montgomery bus boycott
- Defiance Campaign
- Beer Hall Boycott
- Organization of Solidarity with the People of Asia, Africa and Latin America
- Anti-Apartheid Movement
