= Gert Sibande =

South African political activist (1901-1987)

Personal details
- Born: Gert Shedrack Sibande; 1901 Ermelo, Eastern Transvaal, South Africa
- Died: 1987 (aged 85–86) Manzini, Swaziland
- Party: African National Congress
- Occupation: anti-apartheid activist
- Known for: South African Treason trial (1956-61); South African potato boycott (1959)
- Awards: The Order of Luthuli in Gold
- Nickname: Lion of the East

Gert Shedrack Sibande (1901 near Ermelo, Mpumalanga – 1987; also known as Lion of the East) was a South African farm worker and anti-apartheid political activist. He was one of the ANC co-accused to stand trial in the treason trial of 1956-61 alongside Nelson Mandela and 154 others.

Sibande played a critical role in the Potato Boycott of 1959.

The Gert Sibande district in Mpumalanga province of South Africa is named after him. He was born in the district and spent a large part of his life there.

He was posthumously awarded the Order of Luthuli in Gold for his exceptional contributions to the improvement of farm workers' working conditions and his efforts towards a non-racial, just, and democratic South Africa.

== Early life and work ==
Born in 1901 in the Ermelo district of the then Eastern Transvaal (now Mpumalanga), Sibande was the son of a tenant farmer. He began working on farms at the age of eight, where he faced harsh conditions. Initially known as Shadrack Sibande, he was given the name "Gert" by a Boer who forbade the use of English names on his farm. For over 20 years, Sibande worked on various farms across the Eastern Transvaal. His reluctance to accept poor working conditions earned him a reputation as a troublemaker among his employers, as he frequently challenged them on issues of exploitation.

== Advocacy for farm workers ==
In the 1930s, Sibande moved to the Bethal Location, where he began organizing farm workers and addressing their grievances. During this time, many farm workers faced brutal working conditions, working from sunrise to sunset for little pay, and often eating minimal meals like phuthu and gravy on sacks. Sibande helped establish the first known organization for farm workers’ rights in South Africa, the Farm Workers’ Association. This group worked to help farm workers recover stolen crops and secure better working conditions. In 1939, Sibande met members of the African National Congress (ANC) in Johannesburg. He soon became an active member, returning to Bethal to form a strong ANC branch. His efforts led to increased awareness of the dire conditions farm workers faced, and he helped expose these injustices to a broader audience, including prominent figures such as priest Michael Scott and journalist Ruth First.

Sibande collaborated with the renowned Henry Nxumalo of Drum magazine, assisting in the publication of articles that revealed the exploitative conditions of farm workers to the world.The findings were published in the New Age. The Guardian released a second article related to Gert Sibande's findings on 25 December 1947. Drum Magazine released a similar article in 1952, the journalist Henry Nxumalo and photographer Jurgen Schoodeberg played an active role in documenting the conditions of potato farm labourers in Bethal. This article received national and international attention however, the reports were dismissed by the Minister of Native affairs, Hendrik Frensch Verwoerd in Parliament. He was deported from Bethal by authorities in 1953 due to his political activism. He later moved to Swaziland where he assisted the ANC military wing uMkhonto we Sizwe. In 1959, twelve years after Gert Sibande revealed the labourers conditions, the ANC reported similar conditions in maize and other potato farms. He was an active participant of the defiance campaign, the campaign against Bantu education and also helped draft the Freedom Charter. He worked closely with Chief Albert Luthuli, Moses Kotane and Moses Mabhida. He was a member of the National Executive Council of the ANC and during his term of leadership, was accused in the Treason Trial of 1956-1961. He was one of the few accused that took the witness stand during the trial. He was elected to be the provincial president of the Transvaal ANC in 1958 and again re-elected in 1959. He died in Swaziland in 1987. He was buried in Manzini in central Swaziland.

== Persecution and death ==
Sibande’s activism led to increasing persecution by the apartheid government. In 1953, he was deported from Bethal, and in 1956, he was charged with treason as part of the notorious Treason Trial. Despite these challenges, he continued his work within the ANC, being elected provincial president of the Transvaal ANC in 1958.

After the Treason Trial, Sibande was forced to stay in Komatipoort near the border with Swaziland and Mozambique. In 1962, he crossed into Swaziland and later purchased a tractor and used it to provide plowing services in Swaziland, where he spent many years living in exile. He died in 1987, in Manzini, Swaziland.

== Honours ==
The district municipality changed its name from the "Eastvaal" (Afrikaans: Oosvaal) to "Gert Sibande" District Municipality in October 2004. There is a Gert Sibande TVET College with various campus sites. There is a bronze statue of Gert Sibande that looks at another statue of Nokuthula Simelane in Bethal. The statues are just outside the Nomoya Masilela Museum which is dedicated to freedom fighters including Gert Sibande, Nokuthula Simelane, Ruth First and Henry Nxumalo. Mbongeni Ngema wrote and directed the R22 million budget stage production 'Lion of the East' which was centralised around the potato boycott and Gert Sibande's contributions. The production also had bookings in Trinidad, Jamaica and Suriname. Sibande's family issued an interdict against the musical production as they claimed that they had not been consulted. The interdict was set aside soon before the release of the production.

== See also ==
- Defiance Campaign
- uMkhonto we Sizwe
- Ruth First
- Treason Trial
- 1956 Treason Trial
