= R39 =

R39 may refer to:

- R39 (New York City Subway car)
- R39 (South Africa), a road
- HMS Zealous (R39), a destroyer of the Royal Navy
- R39: Danger of very serious irreversible effects, a risk phrase
- R-39 Rif, a Soviet submarine-launched ballistic missile
