= Oshoek =

Border crossing between South Africa and Eswatini

Oshoek in Mpumalanga is the main border post between South Africa and Eswatini The N17 national road starts here. The area on the /Eswatini side of the border is known as Ngwenya, and the road (MR3 Road) leads directly to Mbabane, the Swazi capital city. The border is open between 07:00 and 00:00 local time daily.

	South Africa	Eswatini
Region	Mpumalanga	Hhohho
Nearest town	Hartbeeskop	Mbabane
Road	N17	MR3
GPS Coordinates	26.2127°S 30.9887°E	26.2127°S 30.9902°E
Telephone number	+27 (0) 17 882 0138/9	
Fax number	+27 (0) 17 819 3481	
Business hours	07:00 - 22:00	07:00 - 22:00
