= Rethabile (given name) =

Rethabile is a feminine given name, derived from the Sotho-Tswana word thaba, meaning "happy." Notable people with the name include:

- Rethabile Khumalo (born 1996), South African musician
- Rethabile Ramaphakela (born 1987), South African filmmaker

== Places ==
- Rethabile Mpumalanga, South Africa, a township
