= N17 (South Africa) =

National road in South Africa

National route N17

Route information
- Maintained by SANRAL
- Length: 330 km (210 mi)

Major junctions
- West end: M11 Wemmer Pan Road in Johannesburg
- N12 in Alberton; N3 in Alberton; N2 / N11 in Ermelo
- East end: MR3 MR3 at the Eswatini border near Ngwenya

Location
- Country: South Africa
- Provinces: Gauteng, Mpumalanga
- Major cities: Johannesburg; Germiston; Springs; Bethal; Ermelo

Highway system
- Numbered routes of South Africa
← N14	→ N18

The N17 is a national route in South Africa which runs from Johannesburg to Oshoek (Ngwenya) on the border with Eswatini. It passes through Springs, Bethal and Ermelo.

== Background ==
The section of the N17 from Johannesburg to Springs is a dual carriageway and is a national toll route. It was the first urban toll road in Gauteng. It runs from the M11 Wemmer Pan Road in Johannesburg to Tonk Meter Road in Springs. The first part of the N17 used to be the old R77 which ran from the M46 Rand Airport Road to the R23. As part of the Gauteng Freeway Improvement Scheme, two slip roads have been made linking the N17 to the N12. It is now possible to travel from the N17 West to the N12 West and from the N12 East to the N17 East, both at the Elands Interchange (previously only possible via the N3). From Tonk Meter Road the N17 is a single carriageway freeway. The section from Springs to Leandra, ending at the interchange with the R50, was constructed by the then Transvaal Provincial Administration (TPA) in 1990 as a single carriageway road. (The R29 ran alongside the N17 from Springs to Leandra).

From Leandra, the N17 then followed the alignment of the R29 to Ermelo, and thereafter the R65 to Oshoek. However, the N17 at that time traversed through four towns (Leandra, Kinross, Trichardt and Bethal) causing delays to the traveling public, and safety risks to the local public, especially pedestrians. The R29 was also badly potholed, and without passing lanes or even shoulders, making the section from Leandra to Ermelo dangerous.

SANRAL commenced with toll feasibility investigations in 2001 for the N17 after which consultants were appointed for the rehabilitation, upgrading as well as design of new sections for the N17 from Springs to Ermelo. In order to enable SANRAL to refund loans for the funding of the rehabilitation project, it was inevitable that the N17 from Springs to Oshoek in the Mpumalanga Province would also be declared a continuous toll road and toll plazas would be erected.

The existing single lane carriageway between Springs and Leandra has been rehabilitated with improvements to the vertical and horizontal alignment, paved shoulders, grade separated interchanges at the R548 (Devon/Balfour) and R42 (Delmas/Nigel), and climbing/passing lanes. The new section between Leandra and Trichardt (21 km) has been completed, and the first toll plaza at the interchange with the R50 is now open. As of October 2011, the N17 rejoins the old alignment just east of Kinross. Other improvements include a new section past Trichardt (3 km) and in Bethal (1,5 km).

The N17 East Toll Road comprises Section 2, 3, 4 and 5 of the proclaimed N17 route. In general terms the route can be described as the existing N17 between Springs and Oshoek, with approximately 26 km of newly constructed sections. The total length of the route is 290 km. (330 km with section 1 included)

== Route ==
Detailed Route

=== Gauteng ===
The N17 begins in the southern suburbs of Johannesburg, north of Rosettenville, at a t-junction with Wemmer Pan Road (Johannesburg's M11 road), heading eastwards. It starts by heading for ten kilometres (with two westbound-only off-ramps at the M19 and M31 roads), passing under the N12 highway (Johannesburg Ring Road), to form an interchange with the N3 highway just south of Rand Airport. As part of the Gauteng Freeway Improvement Project, there are now two slip roads linking the N17 to the N12; one linking the N17 West to the N12 West and one linking the N12 East to the N17 East (previously only possible via the N3 freeway). At the N3 interchange is the Gosforth Toll Plaza (the first N17 toll plaza).

From the N3 interchange, the N17 goes eastwards through the City of Ekurhuleni for thirty kilometres, bypassing Germiston, Boksburg, Benoni and Brakpan, meeting the R21 and R23, to Springs, where there are off-ramp junctions with Tonk Meter Road (M63 road) and Wit Road (R51 road). This marks the end of section 1 of the proclaimed N17 route. On this section, just after the R23 junction in the suburb of Dalpark in Brakpan, is a tollgate (Dalpark Toll Plaza).

The N17 national route continues for 50 kilometres eastwards from the R51 Springs junction, meeting the R42 and bypassing Devon, to cross into Mpumalanga province and reach the town of Leandra. This marks the end of section 2 of the proclaimed N17 route.

From Johannesburg, the N17 is followed by the R29 road (parallel from Springs). This road may be used as an alternative in times when the N17 Section 2 is experiencing issues.

=== Mpumalanga ===
In Leandra, the N17 reaches an intersection with the R50 road, which is the end of section 2. At this interchange, there is a tollgate (Leandra Toll Plaza).

The N17 used to form a Z-shape in Leandra, being concurrent with the R50 from this junction north-westwards for 3 kilometers up to the junction with the R29, where the N17 would continue eastwards. But Today, the N17 is a continuous eastwards highway from its primary junction with the R50. (Avoiding the Leandra Town Centre and the upcoming Kinross Town Centre by bypassing to the south)

So, as the R29 used to end at the junction with the R50, it now also continues eastwards on that old section of the N17 route through Leandra Central and Kinross Central, remaining an alternative route to the current N17.

From the R50 junction, the N17 continues eastwards for twenty kilometres, bypassing Kinross, to meet the R580 road at a point north-east of Evander and north-west of Secunda. This junction, known as the Leven Station Junction, also marks the eastern end of the R29 route (the N17 highway no longer has a parallel route following it for the remainder of its length) (the N17 continues eastwards on its old alignment from here).

From the R29/R580 junction, the N17 continues eastwards for another ten kilometres to reach the town of Trichardt. As the N17 used to pass through the Trichardt town centre, it has now been realigned to bypass it to the north, remaining one continuous main road.

From Trichardt, the N17 continues eastwards for 25 kilometres, through the Trichardt Toll Plaza, to reach the town of Bethal, which marks the end of section 3 of the proclaimed N17 route. North of Bethal town centre, the N17 meets the R35 and R38 routes and they become one road southwards through the town centre (Moses Kotane Street) for a few kilometres. At Bethal Police Station, the R38 becomes its own road south-west and in the southern suburbs, the R35 becomes its own road southwards.

From the R35 split in Bethal, the N17 goes eastwards for fifty kilometres to the city of Ermelo, which marks the end of section 4 of the proclaimed N17 route. Approximately 13 kilometres before Ermelo is the last N17 toll plaza (Ermelo Toll Plaza). As of 2015, plans are underway to find a route for construction in order for traffic to skip the town centre.

In Ermelo Central, the N17 enters as Joubert Street and meets the north-eastern terminus of the R39 road before it reaches an intersection with the N11 national route (Kerk Street), just one kilometre north of the N11's intersection with the N2 national route terminus. The N17 joins the N11 northwards up to the junction with Fourie Street, where the N17 turns eastwards. The route continues towards the north-east, meeting the western terminus of the R65 road just after Ermelo Central. At the junction with the southern terminus of the R36 road approximately 7 kilometres from Ermelo Central, the N17 continues eastwards by way of a right turn.

3 kilometers before the town of Warburton, the N11 is joined by the R33 route eastwards and they are one road for 10 kilometers, bypassing Warburton, before the R33 becomes its own road southwards.

The N17 continues eastwards to reach the Oshoek border post with Eswatini, marking its end. It becomes the MR3 road on the other side and proceeds through Ngwenya to the city of Mbabane (Eswatini's Capital City).

The 5th and last section of the proclaimed N17 route, from Ermelo through Chrissiesmeer, Warburton and Hartebeeskop to Oshoek is 123 kilometers. The total distance of the N17 national route from Johannesburg is 330 kilometres (290 kilometers from Springs).

== Proposed Extension ==
There were plans to extend the N17 (Section 1) westwards from its present terminus with the M11 at Wemmer Pan Road in Johannesburg to Krugersdorp. This would have made it a much needed second link between the East Rand and West Rand (presently the main link is via the N12/N3/M2 and R41 Main Reef Road or R24 Albertina Sisulu Road).

As part of the infrastructure built for the Soccer World Cup in 2010, a small portion of the N17, Section 1 has been built, including an interchange with the N1 highway (Johannesburg Western Bypass) (north off-ramp and south on-ramp only). However, the N17 remains a dual carriageway road, and not freeway for this section. It runs for approximately 8 km from the M5 Baragwanath Road (Nasrec Road) north of FNB Stadium and then sharply veers off its alignment to end at the Klipsruit Valley Road (M10) and Soweto Highway (M70) junction north of Soweto. Even though this short stretch of road is labelled as the N17 on road signage and on maps, there are no plans to build the remainder of the N17 in either direction.
