= R575 (South Africa) =

Regional route in South Africa

Regional route R575

Route information
- Length: 28.3 km (17.6 mi)

Major junctions
- North end: R555 in Middelburg
- N4 near Middelburg
- South end: R544 north of Vandyksdrif

Location
- Country: South Africa
- Major cities: Middelburg

Highway system
- Numbered routes of South Africa
← R573	→ R576

The R575 is a Regional Route in Mpumalanga, South Africa that connects Middelburg with Vandyksdrif.

== Route ==
Its northern origin is the R555 just west of Middelburg. It heads south-south-west to cross the N4 highway (Maputo Corridor) and end at the R544 just north of Vandyksdrif.
