= Ciska =

Ciska is a feminine given name. Notable people with the name include:

- Ciska Jansen (born 1944), Dutch long jumper
- Ciska Jordaan, South African politician
- Ciska Peters, Dutch singer

== See also ==
- Ciška Hartny, pen name of Belarusian writer Zmicier Zhylunovich
