= Borehole UC 65 =

Coordinates: 26°30′31″S 29°07′33″E

Borehole UC 65 is a provincial heritage site near Evander in the Mpumalanga province of South Africa.

In 1985 it was described in the Government Gazette as

In 1951 Borehole U.C. 65 was the first prospecting hole to penetrate the auriferous Kimberley Reef in the vicinity of the present Evander. This event led to the development of an important new South African goldfield, viz the Evander Goldfield.

The heritage site is situated on portion 107 of the farm Winkelhaak 135, IS.

== Union Corporation ==
Borehole UC 65 was a prospecting site controlled by the Union Corporation mining company, founded in 1897. Union Corporation had sole control over the 1951 discovery of the Evander gold field, and established four mines there: Bracken, Kinross, Leslie and Winkelhaak.
