= Xanthoparmelia enteroxantha =

Scientific classification
- Kingdom: Fungi
- Division: Ascomycota
- Class: Lecanoromycetes
- Order: Lecanorales
- Family: Parmeliaceae
- Genus: Xanthoparmelia
- Species: X. enteroxantha

Binomial name
- Xanthoparmelia enteroxantha Hale (1986)

Species of lichen

Xanthoparmelia enteroxantha is a species of saxicolous (rock-dwelling), foliose lichen in the family Parmeliaceae. Found in Southern Africa, it was formally described as a new species in 1986 by the American lichenologist Mason Hale. The type specimen was collected from the Cape Province at an elevation of about 1,000 m (3,300 ft), where it was found growing on rock outcrops along highway R38 about 22 km (14 mi) northwest of the Cango Caves. The lichen contains salazinic acid, usnic acid, skyrinol, oxyskyrin, skyrin, and an unidentified anthraquinone substance.

== See also ==
- List of Xanthoparmelia species
