= R555 (South Africa) =

Road in South Africa

Regional route R555

Route information
- Maintained by RAL and SANRAL
- Length: 336 km (209 mi)

Major junctions
- Southwest end: R29 at Springs
- R42 / R50 at Delmas; R545 at Ogies; R547 near Ogies; N12 exit 524; N4 exit 99 at eMalahleni; R544 / R104 at eMalahleni; R575 near Middelburg; N11 / R35 / R104 at Middelburg; R33 at Stoffberg; R577 at Roossenekal; R37 at Burgersfort
- Northeast end: R36 near Ohrigstad

Location
- Country: South Africa
- Major cities: Springs, Delmas, eMalahleni, Middelburg, Ohrigstad

Highway system
- Numbered routes of South Africa
← R554	→ R556

The R555 is a Regional Route in South Africa that connects Springs with Ohrigstad via Delmas, Ogies, Witbank, Middelburg, Stoffberg and Burgersfort.

== Route ==
The R555 begins in Springs, Gauteng, at an intersection with the R29 road north of the city centre. It goes north-east as Welgedacht Road and after 8 kilometres, it becomes the road eastwards by way of a right turn. It heads east-north-east into Mpumalanga, initially paralleling the N12 highway. It goes for 20 kilometres, passing through Eloff, to cross the cosigned R42/R50 road in Delmas.

While still parallel to the N12, It proceeds eastwards for 42 kilometres to the town of Ogies, where it meets the R545 at a staggered junction. It then proceeds for 27 kilometres, turning to the north-north-east, meeting the northern terminus of the R547 and crossing the N12 highway (no longer parallel), to enter Witbank as Provincial Road and reach an interchange with the N4 highway (Maputo Corridor) as Walter Sisulu Drive.

Just after crossing the N4 highway, at the Witbank Long-Distance Taxi Rank in Witbank Central, the R555 meets the R544 (Beatty Avenue) and the R104 (Diederichs Street). Here, the R544 becomes Walter Sisulu Drive north-north-west towards Verena while the R555 becomes Voortrekker Street towards the north-east.

From the R544 junction in Witbank, the R555 goes east-north-east for 29 kilometres, leaving Witbank as Voortrekker Street, crossing the Olifants River and meeting the northern terminus of the R575 road, to reach Middelburg. It enters Middelburg as Walter Sisulu Street. At the Cowen Ntuli Street junction, the R555 meets the N11 national route from Marble Hall and they become cosigned on Cowen Ntuli Street eastwards. The co-signed route meets the northern terminus of the R35. Just after meeting the R35, the R555 leaves Cowen Ntuli Street (which remains with the N11 designation) and turns to the north-east.

Leaving Middelburg, it goes for 59 kilometres to the town of Stoffberg, where it makes a staggered junction with the R33 (cosigned for 3 kilometres). Just after, it crosses into Limpopo Province and the route continues for 110 kilometres north-east, following the Steelpoort River, passing through Roossenekal (where it meets the western terminus of the R577) and Steelpoort before crossing the R37 at a staggered junction at Burgersfort (cosigned for 2 kilometres). 32 kilometres east-south-east of Burgersfort, the route's north-eastern end is reached, at an intersection with the R36 at Ohrigstad (north of the town centre).
