= Embalenhle =

eMbalenhle eMbali
- Location within Mpumalanga Location within South Africa
- Coordinates: 26.546°S 29.081°E
- Country: South Africa
- Province: Mpumalanga
- District: Gert Sibande
- Municipality: Govan Mbeki

Area
  - Total: 19.65 km^{2} (7.59 sq mi)

Population (2011)
  - Total: 118,889
  - Estimate (2026): 172,256
  - Density: 6,050/km^{2} (15,670/sq mi)

Racial makeup (2011)
  - Black African: 99.0%
  - Coloured: 0.4%
  - Indian/Asian: 0.2%
  - White: 0.2%
  - Other: 0.2%

First languages (2011)
  - Zulu: 49.8%
  - Xhosa: 10.9%
  - Sotho: 10.1%
  - S. Ndebele: 9.1%
  - Other: 20.0%
- Time zone: UTC+2 (SAST)
- Postal code (street): 2285
- PO box: 2285

eMbalenhle is a township in Govan Mbeki Local Municipality in the Mpumalanga province of South Africa.

It was established in the 1970s to serve as a black-only township for the neighbouring Secunda, which was founded at the same time. Similar to Secunda, a substantial part of housing in eMbalenhle has been constructed by Sasol for its workers.

eMbalenhle is 10 km away from Secunda, and either town is generally accessed from the other by means of using the R580 road.
