= Union Corporation =

South African mining house

Union Corporation Limited was a South African mining house. It was founded as the A Goerz & Co Ltd in the late 1890s as a gold mining company. After World War One, it was renamed the Union Corporation. In 1980 it was merged into the General Mining and Finance Corporation later called Gencor.

== History ==
It was founded on 29 December 1897 as A Goerz & Co Ltd. It took over the interests of the British registered company founded by Adolf Goerz in 1893. It had purchased 326 claims on the Witwatersrand gold fields. In 1902 the company listed on the London Stock Exchange after a share offering was taken up by British and French investors.

In 1908 it had opened gold mines on the Far East Rand and by 1914 it had financed the Modderfontein Deep Levels mine. The company was renamed Union Corporation in 1918.

The company owned the East Geduld. In 1947, the construction of the St Helena mine began in the Orange Free State. It discovered the Evander goldfields in 1951, and would open four mines in Evander.

In 1969, it started Impala Platinum, and became a uranium producer at Beisa in 1978. Other interests included mineral sands north of Richards Bay as Richards Bay Minerals and had an interest in the Port of Richards Bay development.

Key personalities included Henry Strakosch, who was appointed managing director in London in 1902 and Peter Maltitz Anderson, who joined the company in 1911 and became Manager of UCL in 1921.

In 1980 the group merged with General Mining and Finance Corporation to form Gencor, which was in turn amalgamated with Gold Fields in 1998.

== See also ==
- Borehole UC 65
