= Adolf Goerz =

German-South African mining engineer

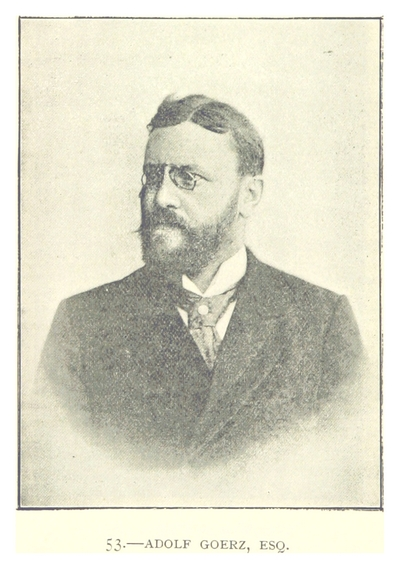

Adolf Goerz (18 December 1857 in Mainz, Grand Duchy of Hesse - 28 July 1900 in Giessbach Switzerland) was a German mining engineer who moved to areas in southern Africa under British control. He emigrated to Cape Colony around 1888. He founded Adolf Görz & Co which later became the Union Corporation, which was one of the five original gold mining houses of South Africa.
