= R38 (South Africa) =

Road in South Africa

Provincial route R38

Route information
- Maintained by MDPWRT and SANRAL
- Length: 300 km (190 mi)

Major junctions
- Southwest end: R39 near Standerton
- N17 / R35 in Bethal; N11 in Hendrina; R33 / R36 in Carolina; R40 in Barberton
- Northeast end: N4 in Kaapmuiden

Location
- Country: South Africa
- Major cities: Standerton, Bethal, Hendrina, Carolina, Badplaas, Barberton

Highway system
- Numbered routes of South Africa
← R37	→ R39

The R38 is a provincial route in South Africa that connects Standerton with Kaapmuiden via Bethal, Carolina and Barberton. It is a main route through the province of Mpumalanga.

== Route ==
Detailed Route

The R38 starts at a junction with the R39 road 16 kilometres north-east of Standerton, just north-east of the Grootdraai Dam. It begins by heading north-north-east for 44 kilometres to the town of Bethal. It bypasses the Emziinoni Township and enters Bethal as Anderson Street. At the Simon Street junction, the R38 becomes Simon Street eastwards.

At the junction just after Bethal Police Station, the R38 meets the N17 national route and the R35 route and all 3 routes join to become the main road through Bethal Central northwards (Moses Kotane Street). At the sixth junction afterwards, just after crossing the Blesbokspruit, the R35 and R38 leave Moses Kotane Street (which remains designated as the N17) and become the road eastwards. At the second junction afterwards, the R38 splits from the R35 to become its own road eastwards (Station Road). At the Holland Street junction in Bethal East, the R38 becomes the road northwards.

From Bethal East, the R38 goes north-east for 38 kilometres, crossing the Olifants River, to the town of Hendrina. It passes through Hendrina eastwards as Beukes Street and meets the N11 national route (Church Street) in the town centre. The R38 leaves the town in an easterly direction and goes for 38 kilometres, crossing the Klein Olifants River and the Vaalwaterspruit, to reach a T-junction with the R36 road just west of the Boesmanspruitdam. The R38 joins the R36 and they form one road into the Carolina town centre, crossing the Boesmanspruit.

At the Voortrekker Street junction in Carolina town centre, the R38/R36 meet the R33 route & the R38 leaves the R36 to become co-signed with the R33 on Voortrekker Street eastwards. Just south of the Carolina Railway Station, the R33 splits and becomes the road southwards, leaving the R38 as the road eastwards.

From Carolina, the R38 heads east-north-east as the Bothasnek Pass for 50 kilometres to Badplaas, where it is joined by the R541 route and crosses the Seekoeispruit. After 5 kilometres, the R541 becomes its own road northwards while the R38 continues east-north-east for another 56 kilometres as the Nelshoogte Pass, crossing the Komati River south of the Vygeboom Dam, to reach a T-junction with the R40 road south of Barberton Airport. The R38 joins the R40 and they are one road south-east for 7 kilometres (Dikbas Avenue), bypassing Emjindini, up to a junction with Sheba Road north of the town centre of Barberton. At this junction, the R40 remains on Dikbas Avenue while the R38 becomes the road northwards (Sheba Road).

The R38 goes north-east for 49 kilometres, bypasses the Mountainlands Nature Reserve, following the Kaap River, up to Kaapmuiden (south of Matsulu), where it ends at a T-junction with the N4 national route (Maputo Corridor).
