= MR7 road =

Road in Eswatini

Location
- Country: Eswatini

Highway system
- Transport in Eswatini

The MR7 road, also known as the Mbandzeni highway, is a major highway of Eswatini. Despite being a relatively short road, along with the MR3 and MR8 roads it is considered to form the "backbone of Eswatini's internal transport system." It connects the MR3 and MR16 roads northeast of Siteki with Mozambique near Goba.
