= Bothasnek =

Coordinates: 25°46′S 30°49′E

Bothasnek Pass (also known as just Bothasnek) is situated in the Mpumalanga province, on the R38 road, the road between Barberton and Carolina (South Africa).
