= R35 (South Africa) =

Provincial route in South Africa

Provincial route R35

Route information
- Maintained by SANRAL
- Length: 159 km (99 mi)

Major junctions
- North end: N11 / R555 in Middelburg
- N4 near Middelburg; N17 / R38 in Bethal; R39 in Morgenzon
- South end: N11 in Amersfoort

Location
- Country: South Africa
- Major cities: Middelburg, Bethal, Amersfoort

Highway system
- Numbered routes of South Africa
← R34	→ R36

The R35 is a provincial route in Mpumalanga, South Africa that connects Amersfoort with Middelburg via Morgenzon and Bethal. The R35 used to connect with the N3 near Ladysmith, but the portion of the road from Amersfoort onwards is now part of the N11.

== Route ==
Detailed Route

The R35 begins in Amersfoort, at a junction with the N11 national route. It begins by going westwards as Sybrand van Niekerk Street before turning towards the north-west. It crosses the Vaal River 25 kilometres from Amersfoort before bending northwards.

It enters Morgenzon from the south as De Jager Street and reaches a junction with the R39 road (Steyn Street). It joins the R39 eastwards up to the second junction, where it becomes the road northwards and proceeds to cross the Blesbokspruit and Kwaggalaagte rivers.

Entering Bethal from the south, it reaches a t-junction with the N17 national route and joins it to be co-signed northwards through the town centre. At the junction with Simon Street, the R38 route joins the N17/R35 co-signage northwards. At the sixth junction afterwards, the R35 and R38 split from the N17 to become the road eastwards. After one kilometre, the R35 splits from the R38 to become its own road northwards. After eleven kilometres, the R35 meets the south-eastern terminus of the R544 road from Witbank.

The R35 continues northwards, crossing the Olifants River and Leeuwfontein and then is intersected at a t-junction by the R542 at Komati. Continuing northwards, it interchanges with the N4 freeway (Maputo Corridor) just south of Middleburg to become Samora Machel Street. It heads northwards to reach its end at a junction with Cowen Ntuli Street (N11; R555; R104) in the Middelburg CBD.
