= Charl Cilliers, Mpumalanga =

Charl Cilliers
- Location within Mpumalanga Location within South Africa
- Coordinates: 26°40′S 29°11′E
- Country: South Africa
- Province: Mpumalanga
- District: Gert Sibande
- Municipality: Govan Mbeki

Area
  - Total: 1.54 km^{2} (0.59 sq mi)

Population (2011)
  - Total: 768
  - Density: 499/km^{2} (1,290/sq mi)

Racial makeup (2011)
  - Black African: 86.6%
  - Coloured: 0.4%
  - Indian/Asian: 0.4%
  - White: 12.6%

First languages (2011)
  - Zulu: 63.0%
  - Afrikaans: 10.8%
  - S. Ndebele: 6.5%
  - Sotho: 5.7%
  - Other: 14.0%
- Time zone: UTC+2 (SAST)
- PO box: 2301
- Area code: 017

Charl Cilliers is a settlement in Gert Sibande District Municipality in the Mpumalanga province of South Africa. The village is some 32 km north of Standerton.

== History ==
Originally known as Van Tondershoek, it was renamed in 1917 after the Voortrekker Sarel Cilliers.
