= Henry Strakosch =

Austrian-British banker (1871–1943)

Sir Henry Strakosch GBE
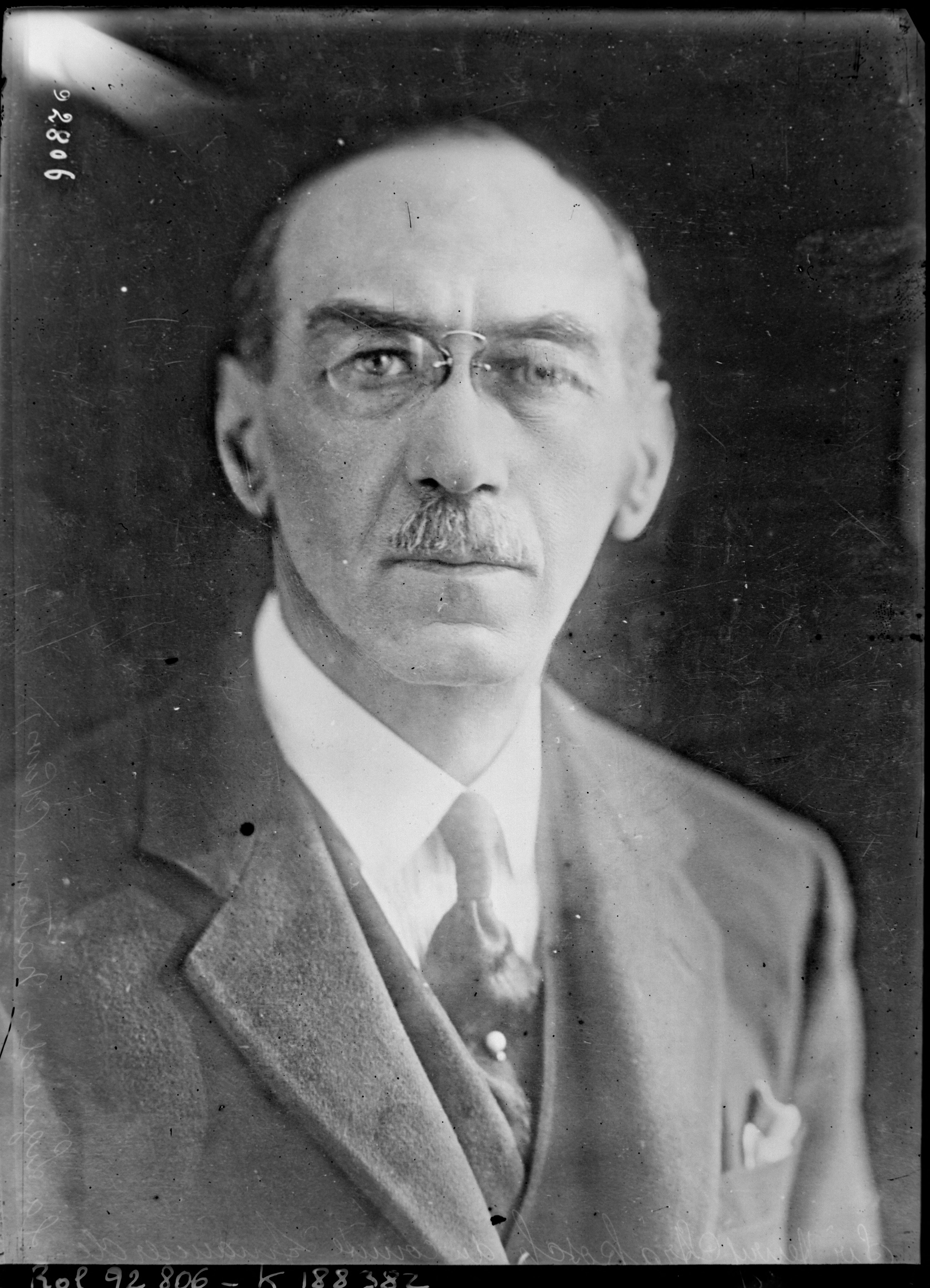

Financial Adviser to the Secretary of State for India
- In office 1937–1942

Personal details
- Born: Henry Edouard Strakosch; 9 May 1871 Hohenau an der March, Austria
- Died: 30 October 1943 (aged 72) Walton-on-Thames, Surrey, England

Sir Henry Edouard Strakosch (9 May 1871 – 30 October 1943) was an Austrian-born British banker and businessman.

== Early life ==
Strakosch's parents were the merchant Edward Strakosch and his wife, Mathilde (née Winterburg). The Strakosch family was a prominent, aristocratic Jewish family from Vienna, with roots in Bohemia. He was born at Hohenau, Austria, and educated at the Wasa Gymnasium in Vienna and privately in England.

Strakosch entered banking in the City of London in 1891, and then began working for the Anglo-Austrian Bank of South Africa in 1895. Strakosch became a naturalized British subject in 1907.

== Financial career ==
Strakosch served as a financial adviser to the South African government, and was the author of the 1920 South African Currency and Banking Act. He was chairman of the South African goldminers, Union Corporation from 1924. He was a member of the Royal Commission on Indian Currency and Finance during 1925 and 1926. He later served on the Council of India between 1930 and 1937, served as a delegate for India at the Imperial Economic Conference in 1932, and acted as adviser to the Secretary of State for India between 1937 and 1942.

He was knighted in 1921, and then appointed a KBE in the 1924 Birthday Honours, and promoted GBE in the 1927 Birthday Honours. He was awarded an honorary degree of LLD at Manchester University in 1938.

Strakosch was chairman of The Economist between 1929 and 1943. He supplied Winston Churchill with figures on German arms expenditure during the latter's political campaign for rearmament.

Files declassified in the 2000s showed that Strakosch provided large financial gifts to Churchill in 1938 and 1940, which enabled Churchill to pay off his vast debts and to withdraw his Kent home Chartwell from sale at a time of severe financial pressures.

Strakosch was unmarried until 1941 when he married Mabel Elizabeth Vincent, widow of Joseph Temperley, a shipowner.

Strakosch donated his large collection of paper money to the Bank of England in the 1930s.

He died at his home at Walton-on-Thames, Surrey, in 1943 aged 72.

== Publications ==
- The South African Currency and Exchange Problem, Johannesburg, 1920.
- The South African Currency and Exchange Problem Re-Examined, Johannesburg, 1922.
- Monetary Stability and the Gold Standard, London, 1928.
- A Financial Plan for the Prevention of War, London, 1929.
- The Crisis. A memorandum, supplement to The Economist, 9 January 1932.
