= Mkhaya Game Reserve =

- IUCN category IV (habitat/species management area)
- Mkhaya Game Reserve

- Location within Eswatini
- Location: Eswatini
- Nearest city: Siphofaneni
- Coordinates: 26°37′30″S 31°44′15″E
- Established: 1979

Mkhaya Game Reserve is a protected area in Eswatini. It is located along the MR8 road.

== Characteristics ==
The game reserve is situated in lowveld wilderness in the southeast of Eswatini and is made up of acacia-dominated thornveld in the south and broadleaf sandveld in the north. The reserve has many dry riverbeds, is dotted with waterholes and has a network of game-viewing roads.

Mkhaya Game Reserve is named after the knobthorn tree which is known as mkhaya in siSwati.

Mkhaya is staffed and patrolled entirely by local Swazi people. All travel within the reserve is guided and requires pre-booking. The reserve is self-financed solely through visitor revenues.

== Fauna ==
The game reserve was established in 1979 to save Nguni cattle, which were close to extinction, and has gone on to include other endangered species such as the black and white rhinos, hippopotamus pods, roan antelope, sable antelope, tsessebe, elephant and Cape buffalo herds.

Birds of note include Narina trogon, purple-crested turaco, grey-headed bush-shrike, gorgeous bushshrike and pygmy kingfisher.

Trials were started in 2009 to find a financially viable and humane method to control the elephant population by performing vasectomies on some bull elephants.
