= Peter Maltitz Anderson =

South African mining engineer

- Born: Heilbron, Orange Free State
- Died: November 5, 1954 (aged 75); Johannesburg
- Occupation: Mining Engineer

Peter Maltitz Anderson (30 September 1879, in Heilbron, Orange Free State – 5 November 1954) was a South African mining engineer.

He was president of the South African Chamber of Mines in 1925, 1930, 1933, 1937 and 1940/1.

== Union Corporation ==
He was managing director of the Union Corporation Ltd.

== Personal life ==
He received an honorary Doctorate of Science in Engineering from the University of the Witwatersrand in 1930. He was married to Annie-Laurie Hamilton and had three children, Colin, Peter and Adrienne, until her death in 1918. He married again to Evelyn Elizabeth Anderson (née Gatheral) and had two children, Russell and Stephen. He named the town of Evander after her.

Anderson died in Johannesburg.
