= MR8 road =

Road in Eswatini

Location
- Country: Eswatini

Highway system
- Transport in Eswatini

The MR8 road is a major highway of Eswatini. Along with the MR3 and MR7 roads it is considered to form the "backbone of Eswatini's internal transport system." It connects the MR3 road east of Manzini at 26°29′16″S 31°27′17″E with Lavumisa/Golela at 27°19′4″S 31°53′18″E. It passes through the Mkhaya Game Reserve.
