= Mzimnene River =

River in Eswatini

The Mzimnene is a river of Eswatini. It passes through the city of Manzini where a bridge along the MR3 road crosses the river. In 1915, the first hotel since Bremersdorp's post-Anglo/Boer War reconstruction was opened on the banks of the Mzimene River, named the Riverside Hotel.

In 2016, it was revealed by researchers from the University of Eswatini, known as the University of Swaziland at the time, that the river's water contains bacterial counts above safe levels and should be boiled before drinking in order to prevent disease. This contamination arises from pollution from the city, as well as outlying settlements, partially due to the use of pit latrines in these informal settlements.
