= Basil Hirschowitz =

Basil Isaac Hirschowitz (29 May 1925 – 19 January 2013) was an academic gastroenterologist from the University of Alabama at Birmingham (UAB) best known in the field for having invented an improved optical fiber which allowed the creation of a useful flexible endoscope. This invention revolutionized the practice of gastroenterology and also was a key invention in optical fiber communication in multiple industries.

Hirschowitz was born in Bethal, South Africa. His parents were Lithuanian-Jewish immigrant farmers. He received his medical education at University of the Witwatersrand in Johannesburg. It was from this institution that he earned M.B. and B.Ch. degrees in 1947. He received Postdoctoral training from University of the Witwatersrand, earning an M.D. degree.

In 1953 he moved to the United States, where he continued his gastrointestinal fellowship at the University of Michigan and joined the faculty between 1954 and 1957. Hirschowitz became a naturalized citizen of the US in 1961.

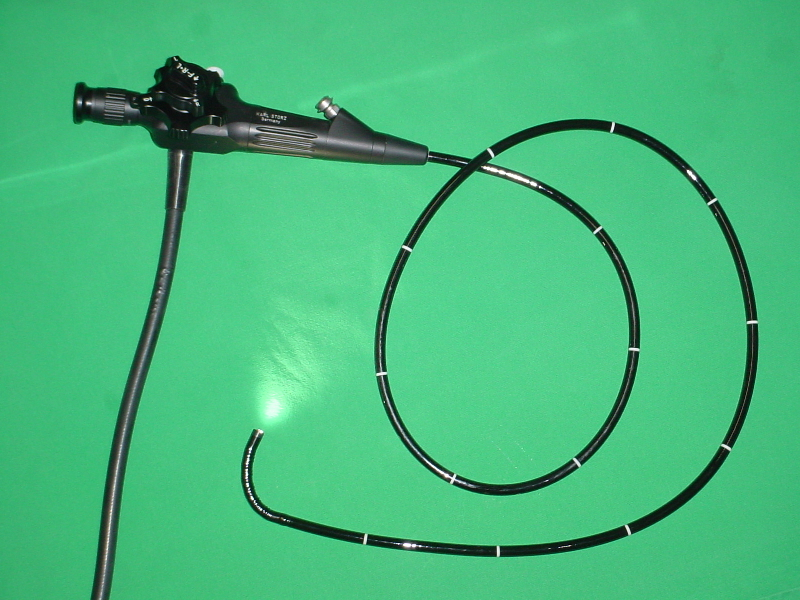
Flexible Fiberoptic Endoscope

Among his many awards, Basil Hirschowitz received the Schindler Medal of the ASGE, the Friedenwald Medal of the AGA (1992), the General Motors Cancer Research Awards Kettering Prize (1987), the UAB Distinguished Faculty Lecturer, and Honorary Fellow of the Royal Science of Medicine. The Alabama Healthcare Hall of Fame honors Dr. Basil Hirschowitz for reaching the pinnacle of academic medicine as a teacher, scientist, and clinician. In 2006 he became M.D.h.c (Honorary Doctor of Medicine) at the University of Gothenburg, Sweden.

Groll-Hirschowitz syndrome — a rare genetic condition characterized by gastrointestinal abnormalities, deafness and neuropathy. It is named in honour of B. Hirschowitz and A. Groll, who first described the condition.

Hirschowitz died in Birmingham, Alabama on 19 January 2013.
