= Leslie, Mpumalanga =

Leslie Lebohang
- Location within Mpumalanga Location within South Africa
- Coordinates: 26.366°S 28.917°E
- Country: South Africa
- Province: Mpumalanga
- District: Gert Sibande
- Municipality: Govan Mbeki
- Main Place: Leandra

Area
  - Total: 2.19 km^{2} (0.85 sq mi)
- Elevation: 1,664 m (5,459 ft)

Population (2011)
  - Total: 190
  - Density: 87/km^{2} (220/sq mi)

Racial makeup (2011)
  - Black African: 71.1%
  - Indian/Asian: 4.2%
  - White: 23.2%
  - Other: 1.6%

First languages (2011)
  - Zulu: 41.9%
  - Afrikaans: 31.6%
  - English: 10.3%
  - Southern Ndebele: 6.6%
  - Other: 9.6%
- Time zone: UTC+2 (SAST)
- Postal code (street): 2265
- PO box: 2265
- Area code: 017

Leslie is a town in Gert Sibande District Municipality in the Mpumalanga province of South Africa. It is part of Leandra. The village is 63 km west of Bethal and 56 km east-south-east of Springs. Administered by a village council, it was laid out on the farm Brakkefontein and proclaimed in December 1939, an extension being proclaimed in December 1957. The village is thought to be named after Leslie in Fife, Scotland.
