= Ogies =

- Location within Mpumalanga Location within South Africa
- Coordinates: 26°3′2″S 29°3′9″E
- Country: South Africa
- Province: Mpumalanga
- District: Nkangala
- Municipality: Emalahleni

Area
  - Total: 1.95 km^{2} (0.75 sq mi)

Population (2011)
  - Total: 1,230
  - Density: 631/km^{2} (1,630/sq mi)

Racial makeup (2011)
  - Black African: 76.7%
  - Coloured: 3.4%
  - Indian/Asian: 2.3%
  - White: 15.4%
  - Other: 2.2%

First languages (2011)
  - Zulu: 33.1%
  - Afrikaans: 17.0%
  - English: 9.6%
  - Sotho: 9.5%
  - Other: 30.7%
- Time zone: UTC+2 (SAST)
- Postal code (street): 2230
- PO box: 2230
- Area code: 013

Ogies is a settlement in Nkangala District Municipality in the Mpumalanga province of South Africa. It is a coal-mining town 29 km south-west of Witbank and 70 km north-east of Springs.

== History ==
It was laid out in 1928 on the farm Oogiesfontein, 'fountain with many "eyes" or springs'. The name is derived from that of the farm. The town developed around train station built there in 1928. The original name of the town was Oogies but that changed to the current version in 1939.

== Economy ==
=== Mining ===
African Exploration Mining and Finance Corporation built its first coal mine at Vlakfontein, near Ogies, which was completed in January 2011. It mostly supplies coal to the nearby Kendal Power Station.

== Infrastructure ==
=== Transportation ===
Ogies is an important railway junction on the Springs to Witbank rail-line, a line that connects to the Port of Richards Bay. It has several branches of tracks that service the coal mines close to the town.

=== Roads ===
The town at the junction of the R555 and R545 routes. The R545 connects southwards to Kriel and northwards to Balmoral. The R555 connects south-west to Springs and north-east to Witbank.
