= Trichardt =

- Location within Mpumalanga Location within South Africa
- Coordinates: 26.483°S 29.217°E
- Country: South Africa
- Province: Mpumalanga
- District: Gert Sibande
- Municipality: Govan Mbeki
- Established: 1906

Area
  - Total: 25.30 km^{2} (9.77 sq mi)
- Elevation: 1,623 m (5,325 ft)

Population (2011)
  - Total: 3,851
  - Density: 152.2/km^{2} (394.2/sq mi)

Racial makeup (2011)
  - Black African: 20.0%
  - Coloured: 3.1%
  - Indian/Asian: 14.3%
  - White: 61.6%
  - Other: 1.0%

First languages (2011)
  - Afrikaans: 59.9%
  - English: 19.9%
  - Zulu: 7.2%
  - Sotho: 1.9%
  - Other: 11.1%
- Time zone: UTC+2 (SAST)
- Postal code (street): 2300
- PO box: 2300

Trichardt is a town on the N17 national route in Gert Sibande District Municipality in the Mpumalanga province of South Africa. The village is 34 km west of Bethal and 32 km east-south-east of Leandra, adjacent to Secunda.

== History ==
It originated as a settlement of the Dutch Reformed Church and was proclaimed in 1906. Named after Carolus Johannes Tregardt (1811-1901), son of the Voortrekker Louis Tregardt.
