= Rethabile =

Human settlement in South Africa

- Country: South Africa
- Province: Mpumalanga
- District: Nkangala
- Municipality: Emalahleni

Area
  - Total: 4.65 km^{2} (1.80 sq mi)

Population (2011)
  - Total: 551
  - Density: 118/km^{2} (307/sq mi)

Racial makeup (2011)
  - Black African: 99.6%
  - Coloured: 0.36%

First languages (2011)
  - isiXhosa: 25.5%
  - Sesotho: 25.1%
  - isiZulu: 13.4%
  - Sepedi: 11.7%
  - isiNdebele: 7.9%
  - Setswana: 3.6%
  - Xitsonga: 3.4%
  - SiSwati: 3.0%
  - Sign language: 2.1%
  - Other: 3.8%
- Time zone: UTC+2 (SAST)
- PO box: 868021

Rethabile is a populated place in the Emalahleni Local Municipality of the Nkangala District Municipality in the Mpumalanga Province of South Africa. It is adjacent to Vandyksdrif.

As of the 2011 census, Rethabile had 327 households.

== See also ==
- List of populated places in South Africa
