= MR3 road =

Road in Eswatini

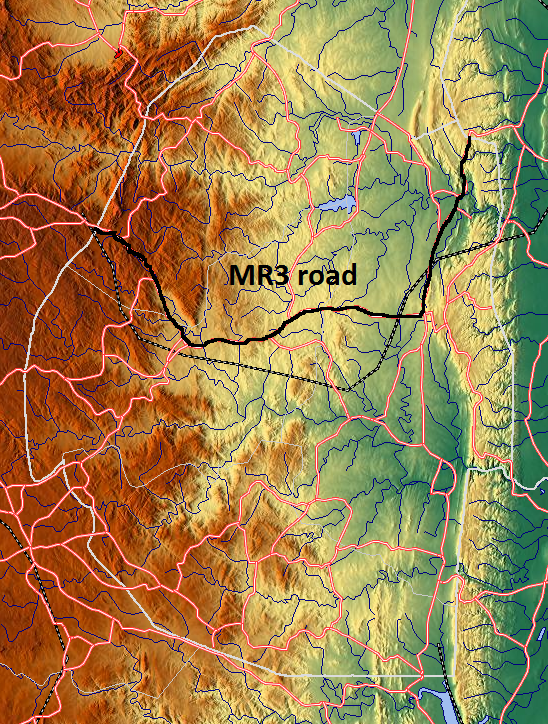

Location
- Country: Eswatini

Highway system
- Transport in Eswatini

The MR3 road, also known as the Matsapha–Mbabane–Ngwenya road or Road No. MR3, is a major highway of Eswatini (previously Swaziland). It is one of the busiest roads in the country, crossing it from east to west. Along with the MR7 and MR8 roads, it forms the "backbone of Swaziland's internal transport system." It connects the EN5 road in Mozambique near Namaacha at 25°59′21″S 31°59′53″E to the N17 road in South Africa at 26°12′45″S 30°59′18″E, near Ngwenya. The road passes through Hlane Royal National Park and through the capital of Mbabane, about 110 kilometres (68 mi) further to the southwest. The highway descends into the Ezulwini Valley in four lanes. At Manzini, a bridge crosses the Mzimene River.

Concerns were raised in the 1960s when the road was built through Hlane National Park under pressure from sugar estates at the park's borders. They claimed that the highway would cause no environmental damage, but now hundreds of antelope, wild boar, buffalo and other game are struck by vehicles each year. The road from Mbabane to Matsapha has been funded by the African Development Bank and the European Union, completed in 1999. From 1999, the African bank and the Government of Eswatini have financed the road to Ngwenya, a regional corridor development known as the Two International Roads Project. The total cost of the project is estimated at ZAR 463.45 million and the Roads Department of the Eswatini Ministry of Public Works and Transport are responsible for the implementation of the project.
