= Ngwenya =

Town in western Eswatini

Coordinates: 26.220°S 31.010°E

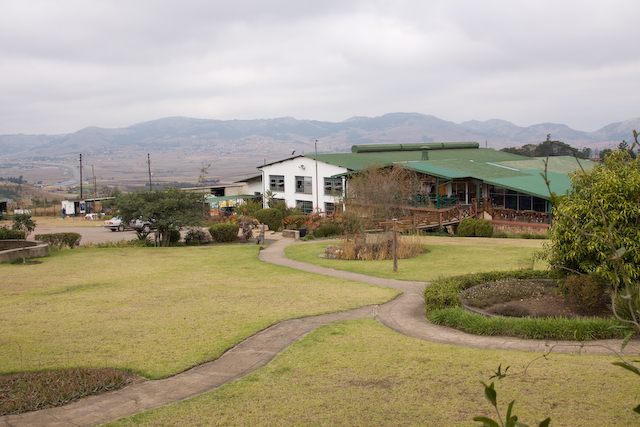
Ngwenya Glass Factory

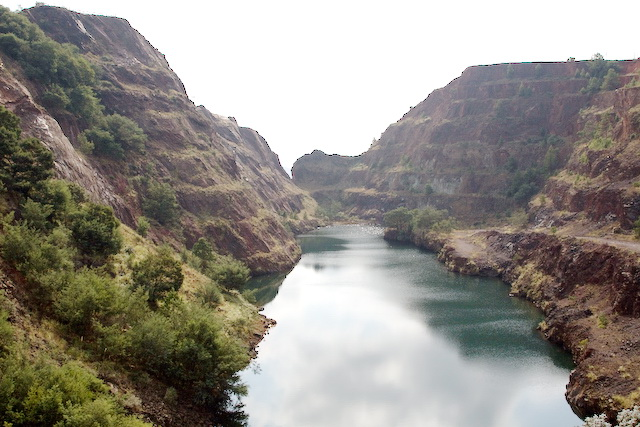
Ngwenya Mine

Ngwenya is a town in western Eswatini, lying near the border with South Africa, north west of Mbabane, on the MR3 road. The South African town opposite Ngwenya is Oshoek in Mpumalanga province.

It is known for its glass factory and artwork. The Malolotja Nature Reserve lies near the town.
