= Govan Mbeki Local Municipality =

South African sub-district

Coordinates: 26°33′S 29°10′E

Govan Mbeki
- Local municipality
- Seal

- Location in Mpumalanga
- Country: South Africa
- Province: Mpumalanga
- District: Gert Sibande
- Seat: Secunda
- Wards: 32

Government
  - Type: Municipal council
  - Executive Mayor: NB Zuma

Area
  - Total: 2,955 km^{2} (1,141 sq mi)

Population (2011)
  - Total: 294,538
  - Density: 99.67/km^{2} (258.2/sq mi)

Racial makeup (2011)
  - Black African: 80.5%
  - Coloured: 1.5%
  - Indian/Asian: 1.5%
  - White: 16.0%

First languages (2011)
  - Zulu: 47.4%
  - Afrikaans: 15.9%
  - Southern Ndebele: 7.7%
  - Sotho: 6.0%
  - Other: 23%
- Time zone: UTC+2 (SAST)
- Municipal code: MP307

Govan Mbeki Municipality (Zulu: UMasipala iGovan Mbeki; Afrikaans: Govan Mbeki Munisipaliteit), formerly the Highveld East Local Municipality, is a local municipality within the Gert Sibande District Municipality, in the Mpumalanga province of South Africa. Secunda is the seat of the municipality. It was named after Govan Mbeki, ANC activist.

== Main places ==
The 2001 census divided the municipality into the following main places:

Place	Code	Area (km^{2})	Population	Most spoken language
Bethal	80701	101.50	8,512	Afrikaans
Brendan Village	80702	0.66	277	Afrikaans
Charl Cilliers	80703	1.58	210	Zulu
Eendrag	80704	1.85	293	Afrikaans
Embalenhle	80705	13.63	91,751	Zulu
eMzinoni	80706	5.19	31,012	Zulu
Evander	80707	40.15	8,212	Afrikaans
Highveld Ridge Mines	80709	71.84	325	Zulu
Kinross	80710	3.99	4,906	English
Leandra	80711	1.59	9	Zulu
Lebogang	80712	3.88	19,396	Zulu
Leslie	80713	2.08	761	Afrikaans
Leslie Gold Mines	80714	0.19	0	-
Mandela Section	80715	0.23	1,083	Xhosa
Milan Park	80716	1.74	4,760	Zulu
Secunda	80717	150.71	26,125	Afrikaans
Sorento Park	80718	0.95	12	Afrikaans/Zulu
Trichardt	80719	1.53	1,973	Afrikaans
Remainder of the municipality	80708	2,555.68	22,132	Zulu

== Politics ==
The municipal council consists of sixty-three members elected by mixed-member proportional representation. Thirty-two councillors are elected by first-past-the-post voting in thirty-two wards, while the remaining thirty-one are chosen from party lists so that the total number of party representatives is proportional to the number of votes received. In the election of 1 November 2021 the African National Congress (ANC) lost its majority, but remained the largest party, winning twenty-six seats. The following table shows the results of the election.

Party	Ward			List			Total seats
Party	Votes	%	Seats	Votes	%	Seats	Total seats
African National Congress	22,287	40.31	24	23,652	41.83	2	26
Democratic Alliance	14,707	26.60	7	15,007	26.54	10	17
Economic Freedom Fighters	10,836	19.60	0	11,397	20.15	13	13
Freedom Front Plus	2,538	4.59	0	2,536	4.48	3	3
Azania Resident Party	1,154	2.09	1	1,174	2.08	1	2
African Transformation Movement	748	1.35	0	715	1.26	1	1
Independent candidates	1,450	2.62	0				0
Inkatha Freedom Party	433	0.78	0	706	1.25	1	1
7 other parties	1,135	2.05	0	1,360	2.41	0	0
Total	55,288	100.00	32	56,547	100.00	31	63
Valid votes	55,288	98.21		56,547	98.37		
Invalid/blank votes	1,010	1.79		936	1.63		
Total votes	56,298	100.00		57,483	100.00		
Registered voters/turnout	141,058	39.91		141,058	40.75		

== Corruption ==
After allegations of endemic corruption a forensic investigation was launched by the Department of Cooperative Governance (DCoG). The Section 106 forensic investigation report released in 2020 revealed extensive political interference in its administration. The report revealed non-implementation of council resolutions, abuse of municipal property and assets, advertisement of tenders without following legislation and awarding of bursaries without following procedures. Senior positions were occupied by politically affiliated persons who lacked the minimum required qualifications or even a matric certificate. In addition several companies that got preferential treatment had senior politicians on their payroll. The senior politician and executive mayor, Ms Thandi Ngxonono, was implicated in the report and took special leave.

In September 2024 the Minister of Sports, Arts and Culture, Gayton McKenzie, said that his office would investigate funds that went missing in 2017 that had been meant to renovate a theatre in Secunda.
