= Delmas, South Africa =

Delmas

- Location within Mpumalanga Location within South Africa Location within Africa
- Coordinates: 26°09′S 28°41′E
- Country: South Africa
- Province: Mpumalanga
- District: Nkangala
- Municipality: Victor Khanye

Area
  - Total: 8.74 km^{2} (3.37 sq mi)

Population (2011)
  - Total: 7,399
  - Density: 847/km^{2} (2,190/sq mi)

Racial makeup (2011)
  - Black African: 40.2%
  - Coloured: 1.6%
  - Indian/Asian: 1.0%
  - White: 56.0%
  - Other: 1.2%

First languages (2011)
  - Afrikaans: 56.9%
  - Zulu: 16.2%
  - S. Ndebele: 8.5%
  - English: 7.2%
  - Other: 11.2%
- Time zone: UTC+2 (SAST)
- Postal code (street): 2210
- PO box: 2210
- Area code: 013
- Website: http://delmas.co.za/

Delmas is a small maize farming town in Mpumalanga, South Africa. The town is located some 19 km north-east of Springs and 73 km south-east of Pretoria. It is at the junction of the R42, R50 and R555 roads.

== History ==
The town was laid out in 1907 on the farm Witklip (Afrikaans for White Stone) and has been administered by a town council since 1965. The name was given by the Frenchman Frank Campbell Dumat, former owner of Witklip, after his grandfather's farm in France. He originally laid out the town with 192 residential stands, 48 4 ha small holdings and 138 ha of commonage but by 1909 the governments added a further 5,500 ha to the town. This would be divided into 85 small holdings of around 64 ha.

== Geography ==
=== Communities ===
Bothibelong is a township 3 km north of Delmas. The name is derived from Sotho and means 'protection'. A newer location is named Botleng, which means 'place of beauty' in Sotho.

== Economy ==
=== Agriculture ===
The farms in the region produce maize, wheat, potatoes and chickens. AFGRI runs a chicken abattoir in the town.

== Sports ==
=== Golf ===
The Delmas Golf Club is a nine-hole golf course that opened in 1960.

=== Motorsports ===
Red Star Raceway is located approximately 15 km (9.2 mi) outside of Delmas, to the North East of the town centre. Opened in 2010, the 4 km (2.4 mi) long circuit was initially designed to house motorcycles but later opened the facilities to cars. Originally developed by the owner, Jaques van Wyngaardt, in conjunction with Andy Farmer and Kevin Owen, the circuit can be run either clockwise or anticlockwise and features a shorter, "Club" circuit, bypassing several of the long circuit's corners. The facility offers a skid pan, recreational facilities as well as overnight accommodation, conference halls and ablution facilities.

In 2022, construction started on a new filling station and convenience store to service both visitors to the track and travellers on the N12 freeway.

== Infrastructure ==
=== Transportation ===
Delmas is an important railway junction on the Springs to eMalahleni rail-line, a line that connects to the Port of Richards Bay.

=== Roads ===
The town is connected by three main roads, namely the R555, the R42 and the R50. The R555 connects eastwards to Witbank and westwards to Springs. The R42 connects northwards to Bronkhorstspruit and southwards to Nigel. The R50 connects north-west to Pretoria and south-east to Leandra.

The N12 freeway connecting Johannesburg in the west to Witbank in the east bypasses Delmas to the north.
