= Vandyksdrif =

- Location within Mpumalanga Location within South Africa
- Coordinates: 26.0998°S 29.3237°E
- Country: South Africa
- Province: Mpumalanga
- District: Nkangala
- Municipality: Emalahleni

Area
  - Total: 19.89 km^{2} (7.68 sq mi)

Population (2011)
  - Total: 741
  - Density: 37.3/km^{2} (96.5/sq mi)

Racial makeup (2011)
  - Black African: 99.3%
  - Indian/Asian: 0.7%

First languages (2011)
  - Southern Sotho: 27.1%
  - Xhosa: 25.1%
  - Zulu: 17.5%
  - Northern Sotho: 9.3%
  - Other: 30.7%
- Time zone: UTC+2 (SAST)
- Postal code (street): 2230
- Area code: 017

Vandyksdrif is a small village and railway siding in Nkangala District Municipality in the Mpumalanga province of South Africa. It is situated next to the R544 road between Witbank and Bethal and is surrounded by coal mines.
