= Evander, South Africa =

Evander
- Location within Mpumalanga Location within South Africa
- Coordinates: 26°28′19″S 29°06′36″E
- Country: South Africa
- Province: Mpumalanga
- District: Gert Sibande
- Municipality: Govan Mbeki

Area
  - Total: 23.78 km^{2} (9.18 sq mi)
- Elevation: 1,655 m (5,430 ft)

Population (2011)
  - Total: 10,166
  - Density: 427.5/km^{2} (1,107/sq mi)

Racial makeup (2011)
  - Black African: 49.5%
  - White: 40.1%
  - Coloured: 6.7%
  - Indian/Asian: 2.9%
  - Other: 0.7%

First languages (2011)
  - Afrikaans: 40.7%
  - Zulu: 16.9%
  - English: 12.6%
  - Sotho: 7.4%
  - Other: 22.4%
- Time zone: UTC+2 (SAST)
- Postal code (street): 2280
- PO box: 2280
- Area code: +27 (0)17

Evander is a town in Mpumalanga, South Africa. It is approximately 8 km north west of Secunda.

== History ==
The town was founded in 1955 when the Union Corporation started its mining activities and was originally part of the Bethal district (named after a town 36 km to the east). The town is named after Evelyn Anderson (1886-1972), the wife of Peter Maltitz Anderson, one of the directors of the corporation.

== Economy ==
=== Gold mining ===
The Union Corporation acquired options in the Kinross area, 64 km east of Springs. Mining started in 1955 though their subsidiary Winkelhaak Mines Ltd. The Evander mine is currently operating in its 9th shaft and employs around 3,300 people. These operations, now owned by Harmony Gold, mine the Kimberley Reef in the Evander Basin and produced over 16 000 kg of gold from 2008 to 2010. The ore is milled and processed at Kinross, 7 km north.

== Geography ==
This small town is located west of the Mpumalanga province with neighboring towns including Kinross, Secunda, Bethal, Embalenhle.

== Education ==
The town has 2 primary schools namely:

- Hoëveld Primary School
- T P Stratten Primary School

The town also has a high school:

- Evander High School

It also hosts three of the campuses of the Gert Sibande College:

- Campus A
- Campus B (Skills Academy)
- Campus C (also known as the CENTRE OF ENTREPRENEURSHIP)

== Infrastructure ==
=== Airports ===
The Evander airfield is located just south-west of the town. With O.R. Tambo International Airport just a few kilometres away from Johannesburg
