= Grootdraai Dam =

- Interactive map of Grootdraai Dam
- Official name: Grootdraai Dam
- Country: South Africa
- Location: Mpumalanga
- Coordinates: 26°55′9″S 29°17′53″E
- Purpose: Industrial water
- Opening date: 1981
- Owner: Department of Water Affairs

Dam and spillways
- Type of dam: Combination gravity and earth fill dam
- Impounds: Vaal River
- Height: 42 m
- Length: 2180 m

Reservoir
- Creates: Grootdraai Dam Reservoir
- Total capacity: 350 000 000 m³
- Catchment area: 7995 km^{2}
- Surface area: 5500 ha

Grootdraai Dam is a combined gravity and earth-fill type dam located on the Vaal River, near Standerton, Mpumalanga, South Africa. It was established in 1981.

== Background ==
Grootdraai Dam is a composite structure comprising a central concrete gravity section 360 m long and two earthfill flanks giving a total crest length of 2180 m and a maximum wall height of 42 m above lowest foundation level. The dam was completed in 1982 and was built primarily to support the water needs of the SASOL II and III coal to petrol plants at Secunda, Eskom's Tutuka Power Station as well as the Matla Power Station, Duvha Power Station, Kendal Power Station and Kriel Power Station located on the coal fields in the adjacent Olifants River basin.

The dam also provides some flood attenuation for Standerton and stores up to 100 million m^{3}/annum pumped into the upper reaches of the Vaal River basin from Heyshope Dam in the Usutu River basin. The hazard potential of the entire dam construction has been ranked high (3).

During the serious drought of 1983, the water resources in the adjacent Komati River and Usutu River basins were badly depleted, leading to serious concerns that the water supplies to various power stations could be affected. Any water shortages to the power stations would be disastrous for South Africa since 80% of the country's electricity is dependent on water from the Komati-Usutu-Vaal system. It was estimated that the newly completed (1982) Grootdraai Dam would empty within a matter of months and an emergency scheme was therefore initiated to pump water upstream over a distance of 202 km to Grootdraai Dam from Vaal Dam. The emergency scheme involved constructing 7 weirs, each with numerous pumps capable of pumping a total of 1 million m^{3}/day. Although the emergency scheme was never used, it was completed and received an award for the Most Outstanding Civil Engineering Achievement of 1983 from the South African Institute of Civil Engineers.

== See also ==
- List of reservoirs and dams in South Africa
- List of rivers of South Africa
