= Henry Nxumalo =

South African journalist

Henry Nxumalo (1917 – 31 December 1957), also known as Henry "Mr Drum" Nxumalo, was a pioneering South African investigative journalist under apartheid.

== Early life ==
He was born in 1917 in Margate, Natal, South Africa, and attended the Fascadale Mission School. Showing early promise as a writer, he submitted various samples of his work to publications and as a result was offered a job by the Post newspaper in Johannesburg, which had published some of his earlier contributions.

He enlisted in the South African Army when World War II broke out and was sent to Egypt, where the South African forces were involved in the Western Desert of North Africa.

== Career ==
He became frustrated upon his return to South Africa. There were few opportunities for black journalists due to the restrictions of apartheid. Most black-focused publications were controlled by white business interests and none of them offered scope for the kind of investigative exposés that Nxumalo had in mind.

In 1951, the publisher Jim Bailey established the legendary Drum magazine with Anthony Sampson as editor, and asked Henry Nxumalo to become the assistant editor. Nxumalo by this time specialised in investigative journalism.

He obtained employment on the potato farms so as to expose the squalid conditions (almost slave-like) experienced by Black labourers. Worried about the lawlessness in Johannesburg "the square mile of sin", he agitated for clean-up and appealed for support from the police.

On another assignment he managed to get himself arrested and sent to Johannesburg central prison. His resulting article, describing the ward conditions and the degrading naked search, was an international scoop. He later got work on a farm where an African labourer was beaten to death with a section of hose-pipe. His investigation into whether the church "supported" apartheid showed the difference between prejudice and the gospel of "brotherly love".

In 1957, Nxumalo was investigating an abortion racket when he was murdered by unknown assailants.

== Legacy ==
- In 2004, Goch Street in Johannesburg's cultural hub, Newtown, was renamed Henry Nxumalo Street.
- Sylvester Stein's 2005 play Who Killed Mr Drum? (adapted from his 1999 book of the same title about his time as editor of Drum) begins with Nxumalo's murder.

== Awards ==
Nxumalo was posthumously honoured with the Order of Ikhamanga in Silver for excellence in South African journalism. The award was collected by his son, Henry Nxumalo Jr, on 27 September 2007.

== See also ==
- Mike Nicol, Good-looking Corpse: World of Drum - Jazz and Gangsters, Hope and Defiance in the Townships of South Africa, Secker & Warburg, 1991, ISBN 0-436-30986-6
- "The Birth of a Tsotsi: Henry Nxumalo", in Anthony Adams & Ken Durham (eds), Writing from South Africa, Cambridge University Press, ISBN 0-521-43572-2.
