= Kinross, Mpumalanga =

Kinross
- Location within Mpumalanga Location within South Africa
- Coordinates: 26°25′S 29°05′E
- Country: South Africa
- Province: Mpumalanga
- District: Gert Sibande
- Municipality: Govan Mbeki
- Established: 1915

Area
  - Total: 6.45 km^{2} (2.49 sq mi)
- Elevation: 1,672 m (5,486 ft)

Population (2011)
  - Total: 15,246
  - Density: 2,360/km^{2} (6,120/sq mi)

Racial makeup (2011)
  - Black African: 77.2%
  - Coloured: 6.5%
  - Indian/Asian: 8.9%
  - White: 5.8%
  - Other: 1.7%

First languages (2011)
  - Zulu: 38.1%
  - English: 12.9%
  - Afrikaans: 9.9%
  - Sotho: 6.9%
  - Other: 32.2%
- Time zone: UTC+2 (SAST)
- Postal code (street): 2270
- PO box: 2270
- Area code: 017

Kinross is a small gold mining town in Mpumalanga, South Africa with four gold mines in the region. Village on the watershed between the Atlantic and Indian Oceans, between Devon and Trichardt, 42 km west of Bethal, 19 km east of Leslie and about 70 km north-north-east of Standerton.

== History ==
Proclaimed a village in December 1915, it acquired municipal status about 1965. Named after Kinross in Scotland, some say by engineers constructing the Springs-Breyten railway, others by the surveyor of the town.

== Kinross mining disaster ==
An underground fire started by an acetylene tank caused the death of 177 miners on 16 September 1986. Another 235 miners were injured in the incident, one of the largest mining incidents in South Africa.
