= Secunda, South Africa =

Town in the province of Mpumalanga, South Africa

Secunda Sekoenda in Afrikaans orthography
- Location within Mpumalanga Location within South Africa Location within Africa
- Coordinates: 26°30′58″S 29°12′10″E
- Country: South Africa
- Province: Mpumalanga
- District: Gert Sibande
- Municipality: Govan Mbeki

Area
  - Total: 173.71 km^{2} (67.07 sq mi)

Population (2011)
  - Total: 40,198
  - Density: 231.41/km^{2} (599.35/sq mi)

Racial makeup (2011)
  - White: 71.9%
  - Black African: 20.6%
  - Coloured: 3.8%
  - Indian/Asian: 3.0%
  - Other: 0.7%

First languages (2011)
  - Afrikaans: 69.5%
  - English: 13.3%
  - Zulu: 6.5%
  - Sotho: 2.5%
  - Other: 8.1%
- Time zone: UTC+2 (SAST)
- Postal code (street): 2302
- PO box: 2302
- Area code: 017

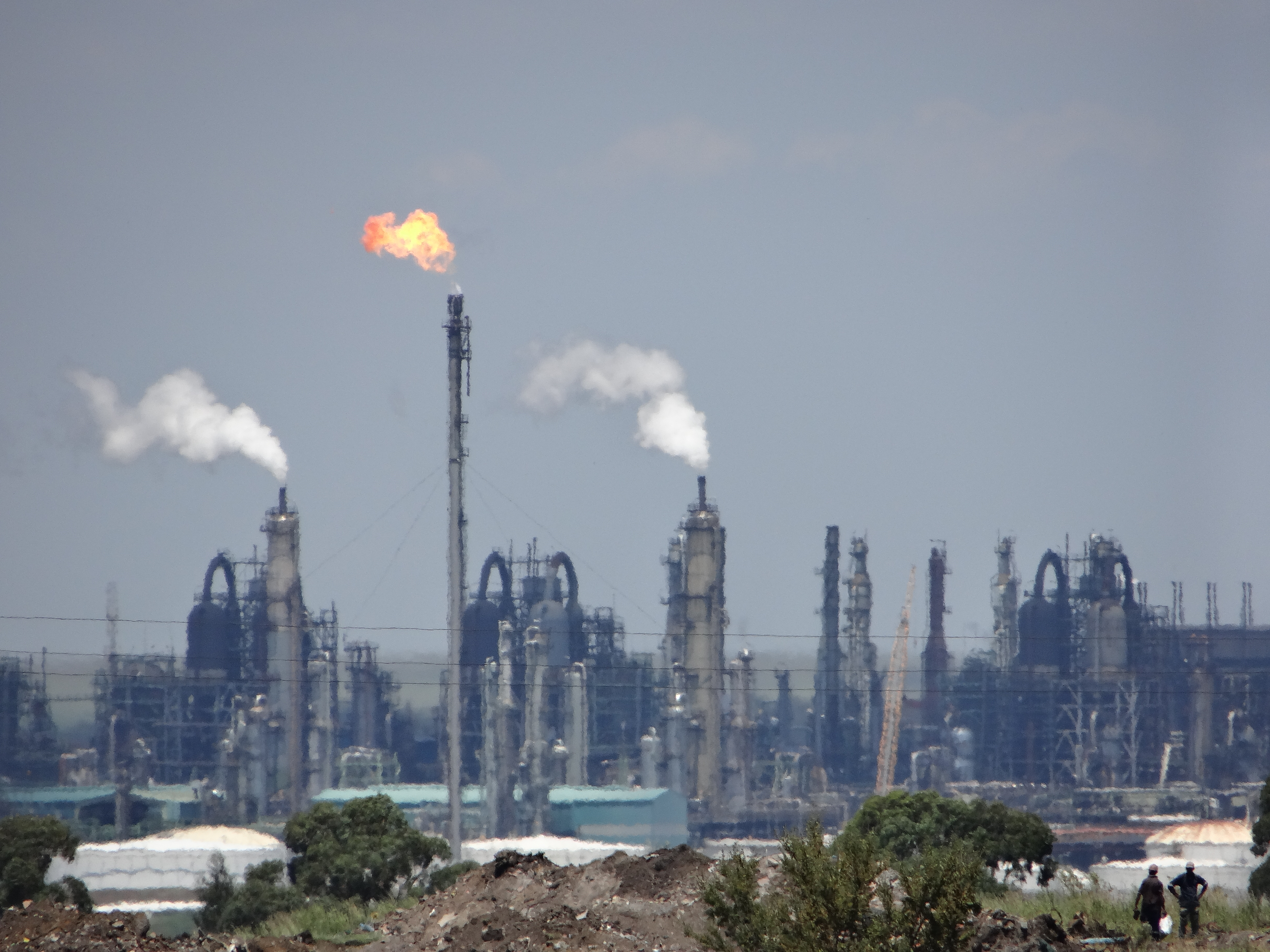
Sasol Secunda

Secunda (from Latin secundus, meaning "second" or "following") is a town situated amidst the coalfields of Mpumalanga province, South Africa. It was named Secunda as it was the site of the second Sasol synthetic fuel plant to produce oil from coal, following the first facility in Sasolburg, located approximately 140 kilometres (87 mi) to the west.

== History ==
=== Early history ===
In 1974, Sasol (Transvaal) Townships Limited, a subsidiary of Sasol Limited, was instructed to establish and develop the town of Secunda. After the site for the Sasol industrial complex had been identified, a decision had to be made on whether to incorporate the existing towns of Evander and Trichardt into the development. Due to the significant financial and administrative strain such an amalgamation would have placed on the established communities, as well as concerns about the pace of development, it was ultimately decided to develop Trichardt and Secunda as a single, unified town under the name Secunda. Evander remained a separate town.

On 28 June 1976, the first section of the town was officially proclaimed, and the first resident moved in that same year. Mr Etienne Prop Smith became the first resident, moving into Tuynhuys, the original farmhouse of Goedehoop, the farm on which Secunda was established.

One of the refineries at the Sasol complex was the target of two attempted bombings by the African National Congress (ANC). The first attempt, in 1980, was unsuccessful. The second bombing, carried out a few years later, was partially successful. Patrick Chamusso, initially wrongly accused and arrested in connection with the first incident, later joined the ANC following his arrest and torture. He subsequently played a key role in the second bombing as part of the ANC's campaign of attacks on South African industrial infrastructure. These events are depicted in the 2006 film Catch a Fire.

== Geography ==
An important factor influencing the location of Secunda was the availability of water. Water for the Sasol operations is supplied from the Grootdraai Dam near Standerton.

=== Streetscape ===
The layout of the town is distinctive in that residential areas, or "quarter cells", are bordered by main roads and green strips. This design results in minimal through-traffic within residential zones. Pedestrian and cyclist access to schools, the central business district, and suburban shopping centres is facilitated by the green strips, which are free of vehicular traffic and provide shorter travel distances.

=== Architecture ===
A defining feature of the landscape around Secunda is the presence of massive cooling towers, tall chimneys, and steel structures characteristic of South Africa’s oil-from-coal industry. The tallest structure in Secunda is the 301-metre-high chimney at the Sasol Synfuels plant. This Eskom-type chimney comprising four 301-metre-high (988 ft) refractory brick-lined concrete flues, each with a diameter of 4.6 metres. The outer windshield structure stands 292 metres high with an internal diameter of 26 metres. The chimney was constructed by Concor, in partnership with Hochtief, as part of the Sasol Synfuels steam plant project. Its foundation includes both vertical and raked piles. It is considered one of the tallest free-standing structures in the Southern Hemisphere.

=== Topography ===
Secunda is located at approximately 26°S latitude and 29°E longitude, at an elevation of 1,620 metres above sea level. It lies 180 kilometres from Pretoria, 135 kilometres from Johannesburg, 100 kilometres from Brakpan, 250 kilometres from Potchefstroom, 530 kilometres from Durban, and 1,530 kilometres from Cape Town.

=== Climate ===
Secunda experiences a pleasant summer climate with an average temperature of 26.5 °C. Winters are characterised by cold nights with frequent frost, and temperatures in low-lying areas may drop as low as -10 °C in extreme cases. Winter days are generally dry, sunny, and warm, with an average daytime temperature of 16.2 °C.

== Demographics ==
The town has approximately 40,198 inhabitants, with an estimated 118,889 people residing in the nearby township of eMbalenhle, which means "pretty flower". Secunda experienced significant growth during the 1990s and early 2000s, largely due to expansions at the Sasol industrial complexes.

== Economy ==
=== Industry ===
Secunda owes its existence to the 1973 oil crisis, as the town was established to reduce South Africa's reliance on imported crude oil. It is unlikely that a large-scale operation such as Sasol Synfuels was envisioned when Sasol One was established in the 1950s. Sasol Two (commissioned on 1 March 1980) and Sasol Three (commissioned on 10 May 1982), collectively known as Secunda CTL, form the largest coal liquefaction plant in the world. The facility produces synthetic fuel, diesel, and various petrochemicals through coal gasification.

Secunda Synfuels Operations, a division of Sasol South Africa Limited (formerly known as Sasol Two and Sasol Three), comprises large industrial refineries located within sight—and often earshot—of the town.

=== Mining ===
As coal is the primary feedstock for the industrial process, Sasol Two was developed adjacent to a major coalfield. Four coal mines—Brandspruit, Middelbult, Bosjesspruit, and Twistdraai—together form the largest underground coal mining complex in South Africa, supplying approximately 37.3 million tonnes of coal annually to Sasol Synthetic Fuels. Two additional mines, Impumelelo (opened in 2014) and Shondoni (opened in 2015), were developed to support production, contributing to a supply that accounts for roughly one-third of the country's coal used in the project.

== Culture and contemporary life ==
In February 1977, Secunda's first library was opened in a house located on Danie Theron Street, with the kitchen, lounge, and dining rooms repurposed to serve as library space. At the same time, a clinic service was introduced, with personnel from the Transvaal Council for Non-Urban Areas visiting the town twice a week. The clinic operated from the same house as the library. A permanent clinic service, staffed by full-time personnel, was established in 1978.

Other significant developments included the opening of the Secunda Sports Stadium on 1 February 1986, and the opening and official handover of the Johannes Stegmann Theatre by Sasol Limited on 6 August 1986.

On 11 November 1987, a modern public library was inaugurated. Known as the Jan Coertzen Public Library, it includes reference, adult, children's, and music sections, as well as an auditorium with conference facilities. In 1994, a community centre was completed and named after Reverend Casper Breedt.

The Secunda Mall opened in late 2013, featuring a Checkers Hyper, Game, a Ster-Kinekor cinema complex, various restaurants, and numerous national retail chains. A fitness centre operated by Sasol is located in the central business district and is open to the public. The town is also home to the Graceland Hotel, Casino and Country Club, themed around Elvis Presley and American culture of the 1950s. The nearby Waterfront, adjacent to the sports stadium, offers additional entertainment options, including restaurants and bars.

A free weekly 5 km parkrun takes place every Saturday at 08:00, hosted by local volunteers. The inaugural event was held on Saturday, 25 October 2014.

Each December, a local business owner sponsors a costumed Santa and his elves, who travel around Secunda in a fire engine-red, sleigh-themed vehicle to distribute goody bags to families in the area.

== Law and government ==
=== Government ===
On 3 November 1975, the Health Committee of Secunda was established by means of an Administrative Proclamation to carry out local government functions. At the time, the town had no residents. The original committee consisted of five members. The only official was Mr J.F. Coertzen, who served as Secretary. He began his duties on 1 May 1976, operating from an office in Pretoria, as the committee chairperson was based there and no office space was yet available in Secunda.

On 1 December 1976, the Secretary relocated to Secunda and began operating from a two-room office in a house at 4 Danie Theron Street. At that point, approximately 150 families had settled in the town, with more arriving daily.

The Health Committee was later expanded to seven members. Six were appointed by the Administrator from a list of names submitted by Sasol, while the seventh member was appointed directly by the Administrator. Secunda was granted Town Council status on 5 November 1985.

Today, Secunda forms part of the Govan Mbeki Local Municipality (formerly the Highveld East Local Municipality), which falls within the Gert Sibande District of Mpumalanga. Secunda serves as the seat of the municipality.

== Education ==
Secunda has three high schools:

- Hoërskool Oosterland accommodates approximately 900 learners, with instruction divided between Afrikaans (75%) and English (25%) classes.
- High School Secunda has around 1,000 learners.
- Highveld Park High School was established with English as the language of instruction.

All three schools comply with the requirements of the Department of Basic Education and the South African Schools Act (No. 84 of 1996). A wide range of subjects is offered, including technical subjects available from Grade 10 to Grade 12.

There are five primary schools in Secunda. Four of these were originally Afrikaans-medium institutions: Laerskool Goedehoop, Laerskool Kruinpark, and Laerskool Secunda. Laerskool Oranjegloed Primary began offering dual-medium instruction (Afrikaans and English) and became exclusively English-medium in 2014. Highveld Ridge Primary School was founded as an English-medium school.

A notable independent school in the area is Curro Secunda, which provides education from Grade R (Grade 0) to Grade 12. Early childhood education is also offered at Curro Castle Secunda, catering to children from 3 months to 5 years of age. The school is owned by JSE-listed Curro Holdings Limited and was established in 2015.

== Infrastructure ==
=== Airfields ===
Secunda has an airfield located on the south-western outskirts of the town.

== See also ==
- Petroleum industry in South Africa
