= Ermelo, South Africa =

Ermelo
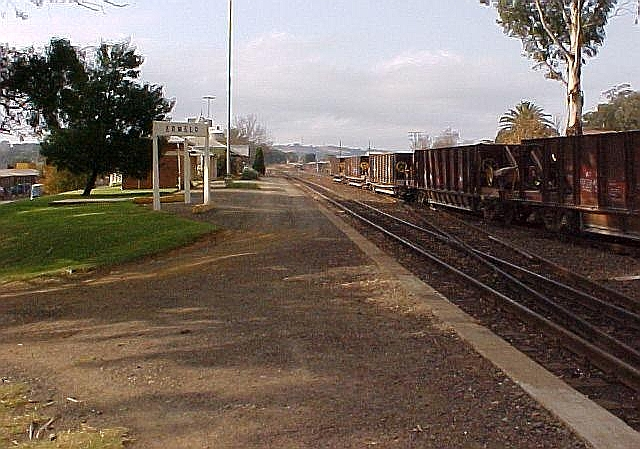
- Ermelo railway station

- Location within Mpumalanga Location within South Africa Location within Africa
- Coordinates: 26°32′S 29°59′E
- Country: South Africa
- Province: Mpumalanga
- District: Gert Sibande
- Municipality: Msukaligwa
- Established: 1880

Area
  - Total: 47.46 km^{2} (18.32 sq mi)
- Elevation: 1,700 m (5,600 ft)

Population (2011)
  - Total: 83,865
  - Density: 1,767/km^{2} (4,577/sq mi)

Racial makeup (2011)
  - Black African: 82.6%
  - White: 14.5%
  - Indian/Asian: 1.8%
  - Coloured: 0.7%
  - Other: 0.4%

First languages (2011)
  - Zulu: 70.8%
  - Afrikaans: 14.3%
  - English: 4.8%
  - Swazi: 4.1%
  - Other: 6.0%
- Time zone: UTC+2 (SAST)
- Postal code (street): 2351
- PO box: 2350
- Area code: 017

Ermelo (/əməloʊ/) is the educational, industrial and commercial town of the 7,750 km^{2} (2,990 sq mi) Gert Sibande District Municipality in Mpumalanga province, Republic of South Africa. It is both a mixed agriculture and mining region. It is located 210 km (130 mi) east of Johannesburg.

== History ==
Some of the earliest inhabitants of the area were the Leghoya people. Not much is known about them, but ruins of their settlements dating back to c.1400 can be found in the area.

During the mid-1800s, the area was an outspan area for resting teams of draw animals transporting goods across the region mainly due to the small lakes dotting the area. Modern Ermelo was founded by Dutch Reformed Church Reverend Frans Lion Cachet (1835–1899). He would minister to the many farms in the area. A congregation was started by Cachet in 1870, and was recognised by the 5th annual general meeting of the church in April 1872.

The town was formed on the farm Nooitgedacht purchased from P.J. Fourie in 1879 and proclaimed on 12 February 1880. It was managed by the church until 1895 when the government of the South African Republic took over its management. Cachet named it after a town in the Netherlands. Cachet was an outspoken preacher, who had a strong interest in evangelism to Jews, his own family having Jewish heritage. Cachet had met and been influenced by Hermanus Willem Witteveen from Ermelo in the Netherlands as a young man, and named the settlement in honour of Witteveen.

In 1901, the town was reduced to a single standing home by the British during the Second Boer War. The town would be rebuilt in 1903.

== Economy ==
=== Agriculture ===
Mixed farming of maize, cattle, potatoes, beans, wool, pigs, sunflower seeds, nuts, sub-tropical fruits, lucerne and sorghum take place around the district. The town is the home of the Nooitgedacht Agriculture Development and Research Centre that researches crop production and animal husbandry.

=== Mining ===
Mining is important to the district with anthracite, coal and torbanite mined.

== Law and government ==
=== Government ===
Ermelo falls under the Msukaligwa Local Municipality which is situated in the Gert Sibande District, of Mpumalanga. Ermelo is the seat of the municipality.

=== Coats of arms ===
Municipality (1) — A municipal board was established for Ermelo in 1903. By 1931, it had assumed a coat of arms. The arms were registered with the Transvaal Provincial Administration in January 1957 and recorded at the Bureau of Heraldry as part of a municipal flag in 1967.

The arms were : Per pale, dexter Or, a mining headgear Sable; sinister Vert, a sheep-shear and spade in saltire, handles upwards, Argent; on a chief Gules a phoenix on a nest enflamed, Or. In layman's terms, the shield was divided vertically, displaying a black mine headgear on a golden background and a crossed sheep-shear and spade on a green background, and across the top was a golden phoenix on a red horizontal stripe. (Note : these are not the colours shown on the cigarette card issued in 1931. Either the cigarette card is wrong, or the municipality changed the colours some time between 1931 and 1957.)

The motto was Stabiliter progrediens.

Municipality (2) — The Ermelo transitional local council which administered the town during the local government reorganisation in the late 1990s, registered its own arms at the Bureau of Heraldry in May 1998.

The arms were: Per fess Or and Vert, charged over the partition line with five lozenges conjoined, per fess Sable and Argent; in chief a phoenix Sable issuant from flames Gules and in base sheep shears and a spade in saltire, blades to base, Argent. In layman's terms, this shield was divided horizontally into gold and green, with a black phoenix at the top and a crossed silver sheep-shear and spade at the bottom, and across the centre a row of five diamond-shapes divided horizontally into black over silver.

The crest was a green mural crown with the brickwork outlined in gold. The motto was Stabiliter progrediens.

These arms have been taken over by the Msukaligwa municipality, of which Ermelo now forms part.

== Infrastructure ==
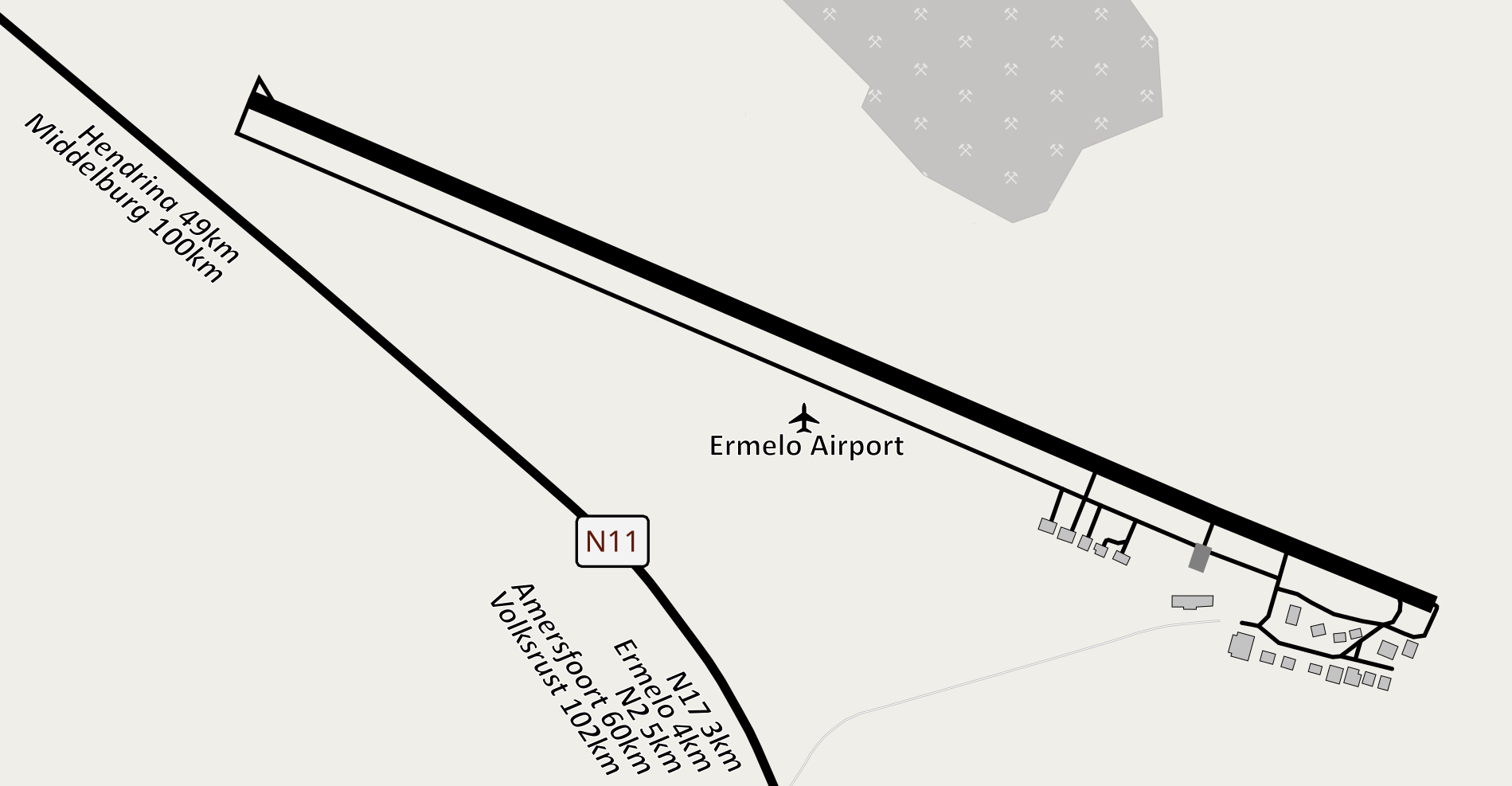
Ermelo Airport, Mpumalanga

=== Transportation ===
It is also a railway junction between Mpumalanga and KwaZulu-Natal. The rail junction connects to Machadodorp which is on the Pretoria and Maputo railway line. The town also lies on the railway line that connects the coalfields with the Port of Richards Bay on the Indian Ocean. Coal trains shipping to the coast from the mines change electric locomotives here, as power converts from Direct current to Alternating current - a legacy of the British and Afrikaner histories of the area.

=== Roads ===
Ermelo is the crossroads of three national highways, namely the N2, N11 and N17. The N2 connects south-east to Piet Retief (105 km or 65 mi away) and eventually Richards Bay (417 km or 259 mi away). The N11 connects south to the towns to Newcastle (152 km or 94 mi away) and Ladysmith (250 km or 160 mi away) and the N3 to Durban. The N11 also connects north to Middelburg (108 km or 67 mi away). The N17 connects west to Johannesburg and east to eSwatini.

== Notable people from Ermelo ==
- Lucky Dube, musician
- Jennifer Ferguson, singer-songwriter; activist; M.P.
- Lizelle Lee, South Africa national women's cricket team player
- Mpho Madi, wrestler, 2014 Commonwealth Games bronze medalist
- Mduduzi Manana, former deputy minister of the Department of Higher Education and Training, and member of the Parliament of South Africa
- Henno Mentz, South Africa national rugby union team player
- MJ Mentz, former South Africa national rugby sevens team & Pumas (rugby team)
- Tshepo Ngwane, actor
- Toni Nhleko, Premiership player & South Africa national football team player
- Michiel Daniel Overbeek, astronomer
- Gert Sibande, political activist
- Johan Velde van der Merwe, South African Police Service Commissioner (1990–95)
