= Kriel, Mpumalanga =

Kriel Ga-Nala
- Location within Mpumalanga Location within South Africa
- Coordinates: 26.255°S 29.263°E
- Country: South Africa
- Province: Mpumalanga
- District: Nkangala
- Municipality: Emalahleni

Area
  - Total: 8.55 km^{2} (3.30 sq mi)

Population (2011)
  - Total: 15,237
  - Density: 1,780/km^{2} (4,620/sq mi)

Racial makeup (2011)
  - Black African: 53.3%
  - Coloured: 2.1%
  - Indian/Asian: 1.1%
  - White: 43.4%
  - Other: 0.2%

First languages (2011)
  - Afrikaans: 45%
  - Zulu: 22.9%
  - English: 10.7%
  - S. Ndebele: 5.8%
  - Other: 20.7%
- Time zone: UTC+2 (SAST)
- Postal code (street): 2271
- PO box: 2271
- Area code: 017

Kriel, officially known as Ga-Nala, is a town in Nkangala District Municipality in the Mpumalanga province of South Africa. The Kriel Power Station is located just outside the town.

== History ==
With a barter agreement between Carl Trichardt and King Sobhuza I of Swaziland, Trichardt became owner of the Eastern Highveld. In 1896, Paul Kruger donated the farm Onverwacht to two brothers, Willem and Pieter Grobler. During the same year two brothers Fasie and Fleetwood de Kock also played a big role in the history of this district. After the Peace Agreement in 1902, Fasie de Kock asked the Milner Government to open the first school in Kriel. Laerskool Onverwacht was opened on 31 July 1903 in a small Milner building with Mr R. McCloud as the Scottish headmaster.

The first Postmaster was Mr. Koot Gilfillan. The post was brought by horse from Standerton to be sorted and delivered at Kriel Supply store. In 1947 a Post Office was built, this building can still be seen on the Kinross road. In 1973, after the discovery of the coalfields, Eskom was granted authorization to develop a residential area on the farm Roodebloem to provide housing and other facilities for the staff employed at the power station. In 1981 Mr. E.A. Steyn was appointed as the postmaster. The new post office opened and was named after the Magistrate of Bethal Mr. D.J. Kriel.

The trekkers did not want to settle in the Highveld region, due to the shortage of fire wood. Little did they know they were standing on South Africa's largest coalfields.

In 1973 Eskom was granted authorisation to develop a residential area on the farm Roodebloem to provide housing and other facilities for the staff employed at the power station. In 1975, a section of the farm Onverwacht was purchased by Eskom and the construction of Kriel Power Station started in September 1975. During February 1988, the Kriel area became part of the Transvaal Local Government Affairs Council. On 1 July 1990, Kriel was proclaimed as a Local Authority.

Kriel Power Station was completed in 1979 and was the largest coal-fired power station in the southern hemisphere at the time. Matla Power Station was completed in 1983 and is one of the largest coal-fired power stations in the world. The economy around Kriel is largely based on producing electricity, although mining and agriculture also play an important role.

In July 2013, local residents demanded the removal of the town from the jurisdiction of Emalahleni Local Municipality, over what they consider an extremely poor record of service delivery.

== Demographics ==
The population of Kriel is approximately 15,000. Approximately another 40,000 inhabitants of Kriel Magistrate District are dependent on the coal mines and farms.

- Unemployment estimate - ±23%
- Housing current demand - ±1500, a low turnover, general trend of inflow ±3%
- RDP housing - 1096
- Water supply - Department of Water Affairs (Usutu pipeline Scheme)

== Climate ==
Hot summers and cold winters. Rainfall approximately 660 mm per annum. Altitude 1598 m above sea level.

== Education ==
- 3 Primary Schools
- 1 High Schools
- 3 Pre-Primary Schools
- 3 Day care centres

Adult basic education training is done by Kwanala Primary School, Kriel Library, the mines and Kriel Masakhane Devevolpment Forum.

== Healthcare ==
- 7 x Doctors
- 2 x Dentists
- 3 x Optometrists
- 1 x Pathologist
- 1 x Physiotherapist
- 1 x Radiologist
- 1 x Veterinarian
- 3 x Clinics
- 2 x Laboratories

Sports Facilities: Golf, Bowling, Soccer, Squash, Tennis, Rugby, Volleyball, Cricket, Badminton, Karate, a Gymnasium, etc.

Welfare services

- 2 x Children's homes
- 1 x CWO(CMR)
- 1 x Hospice
- 1 x Lions Club

== Economy ==
Kriel has a good infrastructure at its disposal and without starting any excessive capital projects, manages to supply in all of the community's needs. Private and industrial stands are available for prospective residents and developers. House and stand prices are economically priced.

Kriel is situated between large towns such as Witbank, Secunda, Middelburg, Pretoria and Johannesburg with link roads in relatively good condition. Kriel is only 50 km away from Maputo Corridor main road.

=== Tourism ===
Kriel is the first port of call on the Rainbow Route to the KwaZulu-Natal coast. This route is characterised by the scenic beauty of nature, as well as being rich in historical variety. The route takes the tourist through the grasslands of the Highveld, areas rich in colliers, fields of cosmos, slopes of varied aloes and undulating hills of Natal.

The coalfields of Mpumalanga are a tourist attraction, with a visit to Kriel's Rietspruit Colliery and Matla Coal being worthwhile. The power station is large and has the production capacity of the mines, with cooling towers higher than the Johannesburg Carlton Hotel, and, add the chimney height, even taller than Auckland Park's Sentech Tower.
