= Leandra, South Africa =

Leandra
- Thuli Fakude
- Location within Mpumalanga Location within South Africa
- Coordinates: 26°22′33″S 28°55′14″E
- Country: South Africa
- Province: Mpumalanga
- District: Gert Sibande
- Municipality: Govan Mbeki

Area
  - Total: 9.63 km^{2} (3.72 sq mi)
- Elevation: 1,788 m (5,866 ft)

Population (2011)
  - Total: 2,023
  - Density: 210/km^{2} (544/sq mi)

Racial makeup (2011)
  - Black African: 43.7%
  - Coloured: 1.6%
  - Indian/Asian: 10.8%
  - White: 41.7%
  - Other: 2.3%

First languages (2011)
  - Afrikaans: 39.0%
  - Zulu: 23.9%
  - English: 17.3%
  - S. Ndebele: 5.7%
  - Other: 14.2%
- Time zone: UTC+2 (SAST)
- Postal code (street): 2265
- PO box: 2265

Leandra, officially Thuli Fakude, is a town in Gert Sibande District Municipality in the Mpumalanga province of South Africa.

The town lies some 45 km east-south-east of Springs, comprising the former towns of Eendrag and Leslie. The name is a combination of Leslie and Eendrag.
