= Bethal =

- Location within Mpumalanga Location within South Africa
- Coordinates: 26°27′S 29°27′E
- Country: South Africa
- Province: Mpumalanga
- District: Gert Sibande
- Municipality: Govan Mbeki
- Established: 1898

Area
  - Total: 51.94 km^{2} (20.05 sq mi)
- Elevation: 1,660 m (5,450 ft)

Population (2011)
  - Total: 60,779
  - Density: 1,170/km^{2} (3,031/sq mi)

Racial makeup (2011)
  - Black African: 84.7%
  - Coloured: 0.9%
  - Indian/Asian: 0.8%
  - White: 13.2%
  - Other: 0.4%

First languages (2011)
  - Zulu: 66.7%
  - Afrikaans: 13.1%
  - S. Ndebele: 6.8%
  - English: 3.5%
  - Other: 10.0%
- Time zone: UTC+2 (SAST)
- Postal code (street): 2310
- PO box: 2310
- Area code: 017 647

Bethal (/bɛθʌl/) is a farming town in Mpumalanga, South Africa. The farms in the region produce maize, sunflower seeds, sorghum, rye and potatoes. The town lies 155 km (96 mi) east of Johannesburg on the N17 national route.

== History ==
The town originated on an old farm called Blesbokspruit. The town, established in on 12 October 1880, was named after the combined names of the wives of the owners of the farm, Elizabeth du Plooy and Alida Naude. It became a municipality in 1921.

== Economy ==
=== Agriculture ===
Bethal is famous for its potato industry, and the annual National Potato Festival was held there in early May, but discontinued in 2007. Other agriculture includes maize, sunflower seeds, sorghum, rye, oats and barley. Animal husbandry includes cattle, dairy and sheep farming. Bethal was once the headquarters of AFGRI, an agricultural conglomerate, now based in Centurion but its flour mill remains in the town.

Bethal also previously had a Nestlé manufacturing facility, which has closed down in the mid-2000's.

=== Mining ===
Bethal lies in South Africa's coal mining region and there are mines close by. Exxaro acquired the Total Coal South Africa in 2014 and has five mines in the area. Apart from exports, the coal is used in the Eskom power stations that dot the region.

== Geography ==
The Olifants River has its origin near Bethal. The river eventually flows into the Limpopo River in Mozambique.

=== Climate ===
Climate data for Bethal, elevation 1,663 m (5,456 ft), (1991–2020 normals, extremes 1903–present)
Month	Jan	Feb	Mar	Apr	May	Jun	Jul	Aug	Sep	Oct	Nov	Dec	Year
Record high °C (°F)	37.5 (99.5)	34.4 (93.9)	33.3 (91.9)	30.0 (86.0)	27.4 (81.3)	25.2 (77.4)	24.6 (76.3)	28.1 (82.6)	32.0 (89.6)	33.0 (91.4)	32.6 (90.7)	34.8 (94.6)	37.5 (99.5)
Mean daily maximum °C (°F)	25.8 (78.4)	25.9 (78.6)	24.8 (76.6)	22.8 (73.0)	20.3 (68.5)	18.4 (65.1)	18.0 (64.4)	20.7 (69.3)	24.3 (75.7)	24.5 (76.1)	24.6 (76.3)	25.4 (77.7)	23.0 (73.3)
Daily mean °C (°F)	19.6 (67.3)	19.6 (67.3)	18.3 (64.9)	15.4 (59.7)	11.7 (53.1)	9.2 (48.6)	8.7 (47.7)	11.7 (53.1)	16.0 (60.8)	17.3 (63.1)	18.1 (64.6)	19.2 (66.6)	15.4 (59.7)
Mean daily minimum °C (°F)	13.4 (56.1)	13.3 (55.9)	11.8 (53.2)	8.1 (46.6)	3.1 (37.6)	−0.1 (31.8)	−0.6 (30.9)	2.7 (36.9)	7.6 (45.7)	10.1 (50.2)	11.6 (52.9)	13.0 (55.4)	7.8 (46.1)
Record low °C (°F)	4.0 (39.2)	6.0 (42.8)	0.5 (32.9)	−1.4 (29.5)	−5.9 (21.4)	−9.2 (15.4)	−10.6 (12.9)	−12.5 (9.5)	−5.6 (21.9)	−1.2 (29.8)	1.0 (33.8)	1.7 (35.1)	−12.5 (9.5)
Average precipitation mm (inches)	113.3 (4.46)	109.6 (4.31)	102.7 (4.04)	43.1 (1.70)	17.2 (0.68)	3.7 (0.15)	3.1 (0.12)	7.3 (0.29)	26.2 (1.03)	85.1 (3.35)	118.4 (4.66)	143.3 (5.64)	773 (30.43)
Average precipitation days (≥ 1.0 mm)	15	9	9	7	3	2	1	2	4	10	14	13	90
Source 1: South African Weather Service (precipitation days)Starlings Roost Weather
Source 2: Meteo Climat (record highs and lows)

== Law and government ==
Bethal lies in the Govan Mbeki Local Municipality (formerly Highveld East Local Municipality) situated in the Gert Sibande District, of Mpumalanga.

== Infrastructure ==
=== Roads ===
Bethal is the crossroads of three main roads. The R38 leads out north-east to Carolina and south-west to Standerton. The R35 leads north to Middleburg 80 km (50 mi) away while the R35 connects south to Amersfoort 80 km away. The N17 connects westwards to Johannesburg and eastwards to Ermelo and Eswatini.

== Notable people ==
- Andries Coetzee – South Africa national rugby team player
- Llewellyn Herbert – 2000 Summer Olympics 400 metres hurdles bronze medal winner
- Basil Hirschowitz – gastroenterologist and inventor
- Qedani Mahlangu – Gauteng MEC for Health
- Busisiwe Mkhwebane – Public Protector of South Africa
- Josia Thugwane – 1996 Summer Olympics marathon gold medal winner. South Africa's first black athlete to win an Olympic gold medal
- Riaan Dempers - South African sprinter and former record holder in the 200 meters
