= Standerton =

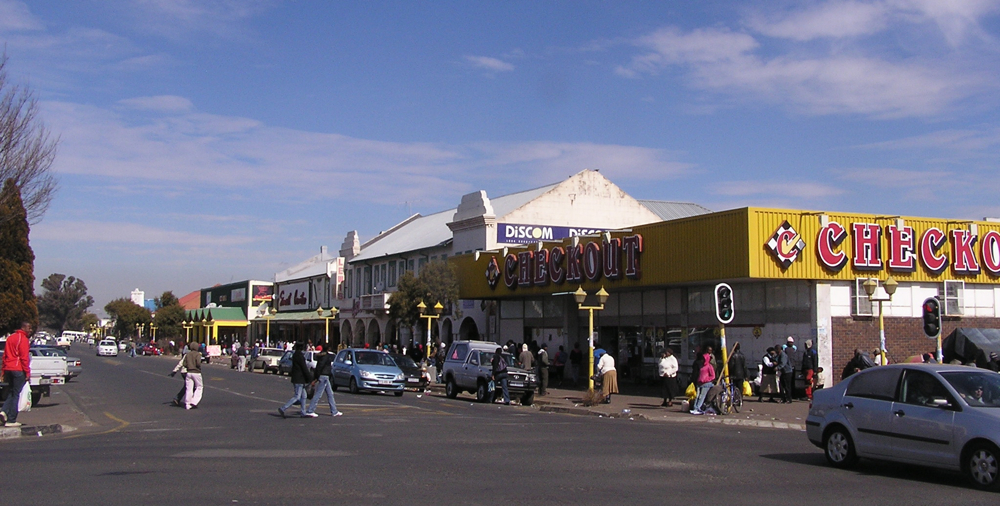
- Central business district in Standerton.

- Location within Mpumalanga Location within South Africa
- Coordinates: 26°57′S 29°15′E
- Country: South Africa
- Province: Mpumalanga
- District: Gert Sibande
- Municipality: Lekwa
- Established: 14 December 1878

Area
  - Total: 36.21 km^{2} (13.98 sq mi)
- Elevation: 1,530 m (5,020 ft)

Population (2011)
  - Total: 43,966
  - Density: 1,214/km^{2} (3,145/sq mi)

Racial makeup (2011)
  - Black African: 66.6%
  - White: 23.1%
  - Coloured: 6.8%
  - Indian/Asian: 3.0%
  - Other: 0.5%

First languages (2011)
  - Zulu: 48.3%
  - Afrikaans: 28.0%
  - Sotho: 8.5%
  - English: 7.4%
  - Other: 7.8%
- Time zone: UTC+2 (SAST)
- Postal code (street): 2430
- PO box: 2430
- Area code: 017

Standerton is a large commercial and agricultural town lying on the banks of the Vaal River in Mpumalanga, South Africa, which specialises in cattle, dairy, maize and poultry farming. The town was established in 1876 and named after Boer leader Commandant Adriaan H. Stander, the original owner of the farm where the town was built. During the First Boer War a British garrison in the town was besieged by the Boers for three months. General Jan Smuts won this seat during elections and went on to assist in setting up the League of Nations. Standerton is the seat of the Lekwa Local Municipality.

== History ==
Standerton was founded in 1878 on a farm called Grootverlangen and named after its owner Commandant Adriaan Henrik Stander.

The South African Republic's Volksraad approved the formation of a town at the drift in 1876 and proclaimed two years later. It was granted municipal status in 1903. The crossing over the Vaal River, now bridged, was known as Stander's Drift and a hill close to the town was called Standerskop were also named after Stander.

During the First Boer War (1880–81), a British unit was besieged by the Boer forces who shelled them from the nearby hill, the former holding out until the end of the war in February 1881.

In May 1900 during the Second Boer War, the Canadian Lord Strathcona's Horse (Royal Canadians) Regiment clashed with Boer Commandos near Standerton. Canadian marksmanship held off the Boer ambush and prevented an attempted encirclement.

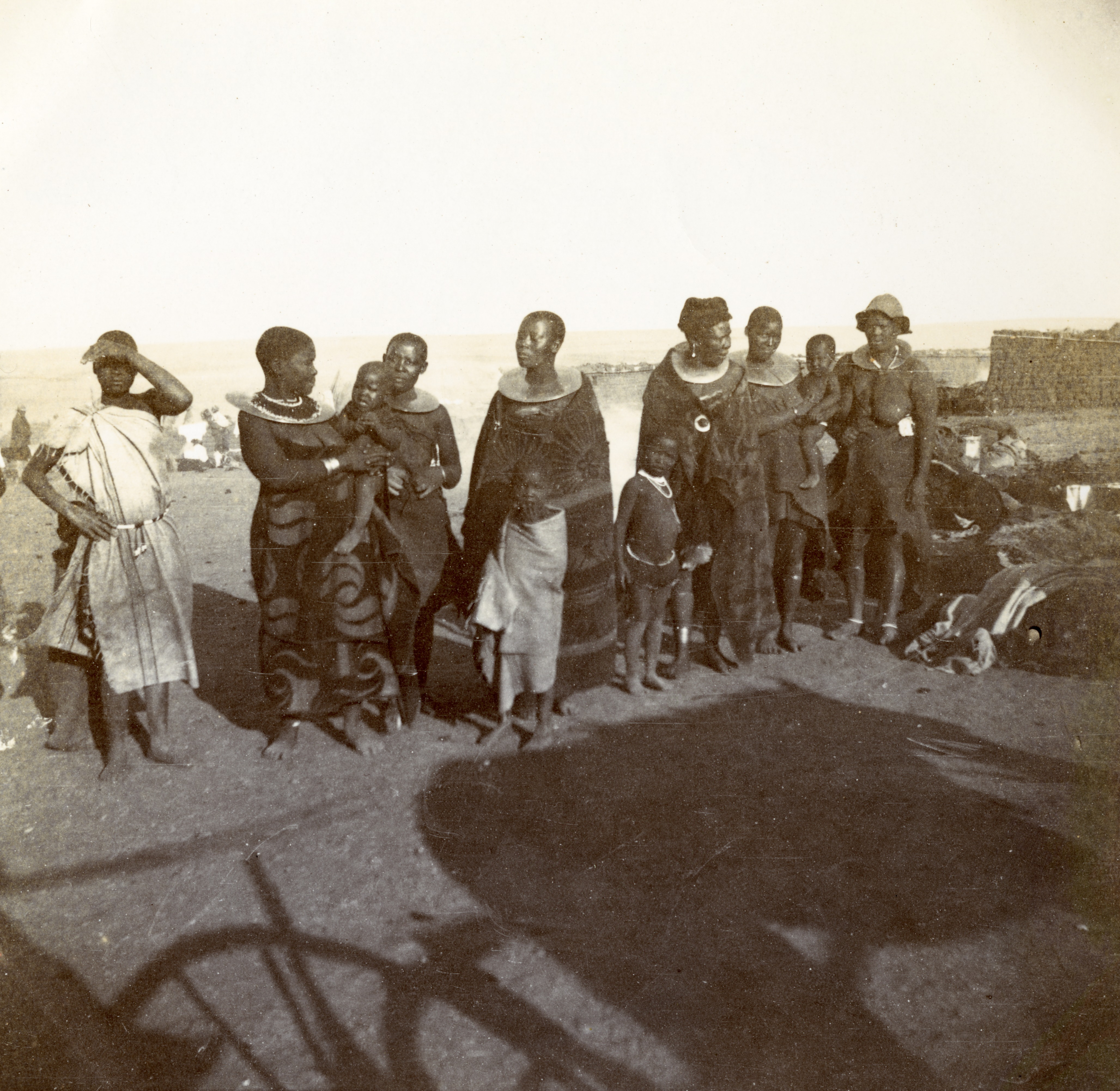
Black civilians in the British concentration camp at Standerton, circa 1901, during the Second Boer War.

=== Great Trek memorial controversy ===
The town has received nationwide media attention in 2007 and 2008 following the destruction of an important voortrekker memorial. This monument, located near the facade of the municipality building, was constructed by Afrikaners to mark the 150th anniversary of the Great Trek. The Lekwa municipality's mayor Queen Radebe-Khumalo ordered the structure demolished in April 2007. "That piece of thing means nothing to us. It's just a piece of cement with tracks. I do not even know where it comes from", Radebe-Khumalo declared in a statement quoted by the Beeld newspaper.

The incident led to widespread condemnation by the local Afrikaans community. Jan Bosman, a spokesperson for the Afrikanerbond, claimed that "actions like these undo the spirit of reconciliation as promoted by former president Nelson Mandela and Archbishop Desmond Tutu". In June 2007, a joint initiative between AfriForum and Solidarity lodged an application to the Pretoria High Court requesting that the mayor offer compensation for damages claimed. A subsequent court order ruled that Radebe-Khumalo and her municipality would pay for the damage and prohibited attempts to remove another statue erected in memory of Anglo-Boer war concentration camp victims.

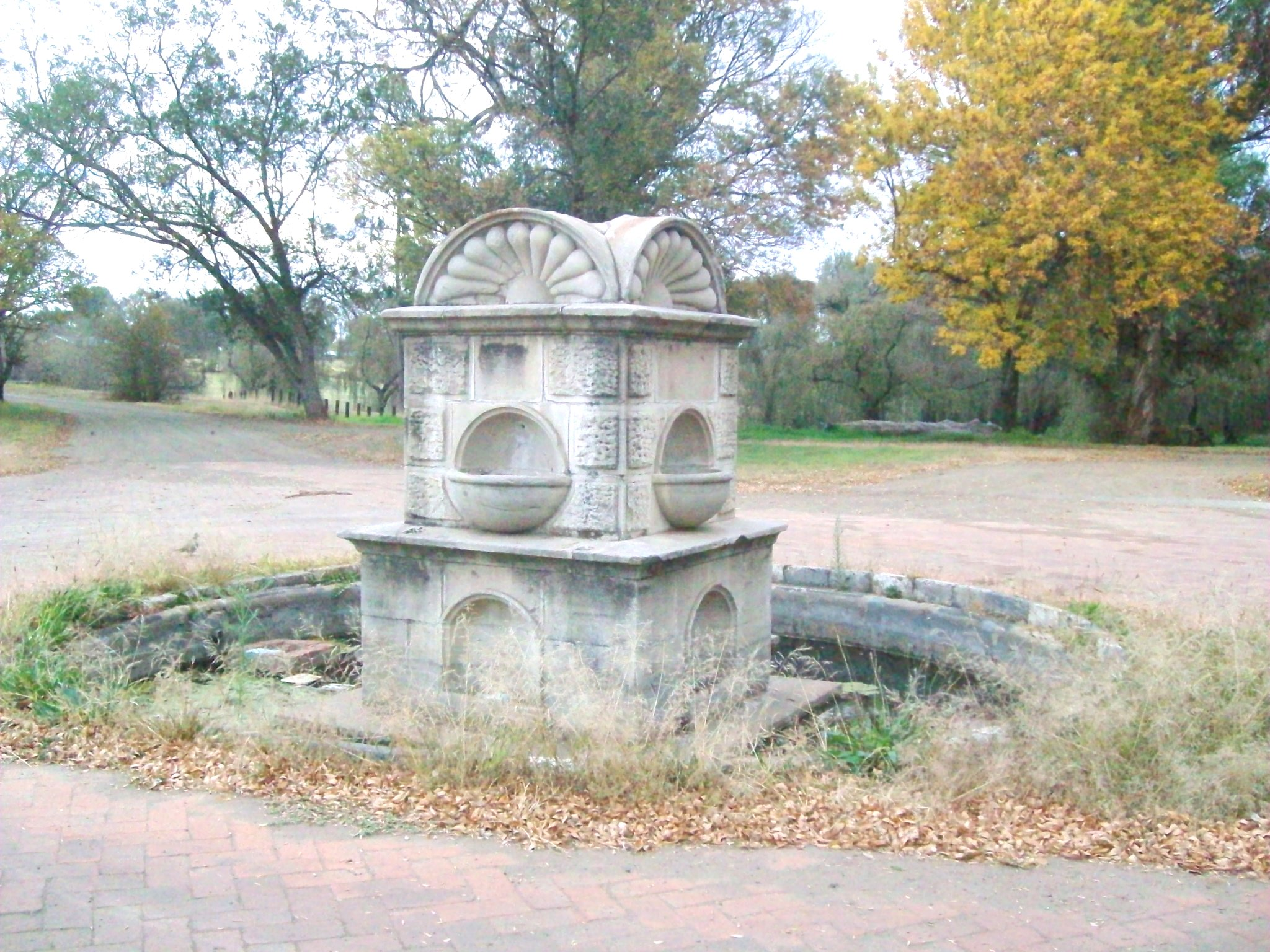
Memorial to those who died in concentration camps during the Boer war.

In May 2010, the memorial was rebuilt on its original site.

=== Sakhile Township riots ===
The township of Sakhile near Standerton was the site of violent, service delivery riots that led to the Lekwa Municipality mayor Juliet Queen Radebe-Khumalo and other senior municipal officials, being recalled by the African National Congress in October 2009. The riots included the burning of tyres and blocking some entries to the town.

== Economy ==
=== Agriculture ===
The area around the town promotes mixed agriculture with crops such as maize, sunflower seeds, ground nuts and potatoes. Poultry and dairy farming is also conducted in the region.

=== Manufacturing ===
==== Standerton Mills ====
Standerton Mills Pty Ltd was established in 1947. Mainly manufacturing and supplying yarn and woven industrial fabrics.

== Infrastructure ==
=== Dams ===
Grootdraai Dam is situated in the upper reaches of the Vaal River less than 10 km upstream of Standerton. It has a catchment area of 8,195 km^{2}, a mean annual precipitation of approximately 750 mm, a mean annual potential evaporation at the dam site of 1,400 mm and a natural inflow of 580 million m^{3}/a. The full supply capacity of the reservoir is 364 million m^{3}. The Grootdraai dam was completed in 1982.

== Notable people ==
Although Standerton is a rural town surviving mainly on agriculture, it has produced talented people prominent in South African society.

- Arnold S de Beer - journalist and academic
- Pieter Hendriks - South Africa national rugby team player
- Angel Khanyile - member of the National Assembly of South Africa. Shadow Minister of Home Affairs
- Jaco Kriel - South Africa national rugby team player
- Mark Lawrence - retired international rugby union referee. He refereed his first international test match, in 2000, and was chosen to officiate at both the 2003 Rugby World Cup [2] and 2007 Rugby World Cups.
- Frans Lourens Herman Rumpff - Chief Justice of South Africa, 1974-1982
- Rooi Mahamutsa - South African football defender for Premiership club Free State Stars F.C. and South Africa. Mahamutsa also played for Orlando Pirates.
- Mfundo Ndhlovu - South Africa national rugby sevens team player
- JC Ritchie - professional golfer
- Gary Van Aswegen - Rugby union player
- Constand Viljoen - South African military commander. co-founded the Afrikaner Volksfront (Afrikaner People's Front) and later founded the Freedom Front (now Freedom Front Plus)
