= List of bridges in South Africa =

== Historical and architectural interest bridges ==
	Name	Distinction	Length	Type	Carries Crosses	Opened	Location	Province	Ref.
1	Kaaimans River Bridge	Protected Site		Arch; Concrete deck arch	Seven Passes Road; Kaaimans River	1904	George–Wilderness; 33°58′15.8″S 22°32′51.9″E	Western Cape	
2	Van Stadens River Railway Bridge	Second highest railway bridge in Africa when inaugurated Deck height : 77 m (253 ft)	197 m (646 ft)	Truss; Steel	Avontuur Railway; Van Stadens River	1905	Thomhill; 33°53′21.6″S 25°12′28.2″E	Eastern Cape	
3	Oudtshoorn Suspension Bridge	Protected Site		Suspension	Footbridge; Kerk Street; Grobbelaars River	1913	Oudtshoorn; 33°35′17.1″S 22°12′3.7″E	Western Cape	
4	Kaaimans River Railway Bridge	Crosses by Outeniqua Choo Tjoe		Beam; Steel	George–Knysna railway Kaaimans River		Wilderness; 33°59′52.2″S 22°33′25.5″E	Western Cape	
5	Alfred Beit Railway Bridge	South Africa–Zimbabwe border	473 m (1,552 ft)	Truss; Steel	Railway bridge Limpopo River	1929	Musina–Beitbridge; 22°13′27.8″S 29°59′13.2″E	Limpopo; Zimbabwe	
6	Tsitsikamma Suspension Bridge			Suspension; Steel	Footbridge; Storms River	1969	Tsitsikamma National Park; 34°1′10.3″S 23°54′12.2″E	Western Cape	
7	Oribi Gorge Suspension Bridge		80 m (260 ft)	Suspension; Steel	Footbridge; Oribi Gorge		Lake Eland Game Reserve; 30°43′16.1″S 30°11′10.8″E	KwaZulu-Natal	
8	Victoria & Alfred Waterfront Swing Bridge (1997) dismantled in 2019	Swing cable-stayed bridge	34 m (112 ft)	Cable-stayed; Single tower, steel	Footbridge; Victoria & Alfred Waterfront	1997	Le Cap; 33°54′22.7″S 18°25′19.0″E	Western Cape	

== Major road and railway bridges ==
This table presents the structures with spans greater than 100 metres (330 ft) (non-exhaustive list).

	Name	Span	Length	Type	Carries Crosses	Opened	Location	Province	Ref.
1	Msikaba Bridge under construction	580 m (1,900 ft)	580 m (1,900 ft)	Cable-stayed; Composite steel/concrete deck, concrete pylons	National route N2; Msikaba River	2027	Nkcele; 31°17′31.5″S 29°47′49.2″E	Eastern Cape	
2	Bloukrans Bridge	272 m (892 ft)	451 m (1,480 ft)	Arch; Concrete deck arch	National route N2; Bloukrans River	1984	Nature's Valley; 33°58′0.1″S 23°38′42.8″E	Western Cape; Eastern Cape	
3	Mtentu Bridge under construction	260 m (850 ft)	1,132 m (3,714 ft)	Box girder Prestressed concrete 150+260+150	National route N2; Mtentu River	2027	Lundini; 31°10′43.3″S 29°55′42.9″E	Eastern Cape	
4	Van Stadens Bridge	198 m (650 ft)	351 m (1,152 ft)	Arch; Concrete deck arch	National route N2; Van Stadens River	1971	Thomhill; 33°54′32.6″S 25°11′49.3″E	Eastern Cape	
5	Groot River Bridge	189 m (620 ft)	301 m (988 ft)	Arch; Concrete deck arch	National route N2; Groot River	1983	Nature's Valley; 33°56′19.9″S 23°33′23.6″E	Western Cape; Eastern Cape	
6	Nelson Mandela Bridge	176 m (577 ft)	284 m (932 ft)	Cable-stayed; Composite steel/concrete deck, steel pylons 42+176+66	Road bridge Johannesburg Park station	2003	Johannesburg; 26°11′48.7″S 28°2′3″E	Gauteng	
7	Gouritz River Bridge	170 m (560 ft)	210 m (690 ft)	Box girder Prestressed concrete V-shaped legs	National route N2; Gourits River	1976	Mossel Bay; 34°11′09.7″S 21°45′10.5″E	Western Cape	
8	Bobbejaans Bridge	165 m (541 ft)	286 m (938 ft)	Arch; Concrete deck arch	National route N2; Bobbejaans River	1983	Nature's Valley; 33°55′58.9″S 23°32′0.7″E	Western Cape	
9	C. H. Mitchell Bridge	158 m (518 ft)	206 m (676 ft)	Arch; Steel through arch	Provincial Route R61; Mtamvuna River	1966	Mbizana Local Municipality–Port Edward; 31°04′31.4″S 30°11′33.8″E	Eastern Cape; KwaZulu-Natal	
10	Gouritz River Bridge (1892)	135 m (443 ft)	214 m (702 ft)	Cantilever; Steel; 39+135+39	Former national route N2; Gourits River	1892	Mossel Bay; 34°11′07.8″S 21°45′10.0″E	Western Cape	
11	Gautrain Viaduct V5	121 m (397 ft)(x2)	4,353 m (14,281 ft)	Box girder Prestressed concrete 95+100+2x121+70 96+110+2x85	Gautrain; National routes N1, N14; Metropolitan Routes M19, M25, M27, M34	2010	Centurion; 25°51′07.0″S 28°11′22.7″E	Gauteng	
12	Ashton Arch Bridge	110 m (360 ft)	110 m (360 ft)	Arch; Concrete tied arch Bow-string bridge	Provincial Route R60; Kogmanskloof River	2021	Ashton; 33°50′01.3″S 20°03′35.9″E	Western Cape	
13	Paul Sauer Bridge	100 m (330 ft)	186 m (610 ft)	Arch; Concrete deck arch	National route N2; Storms River	1956	Stormsrivier; 33°58′6.6″S 23°55′53.6″E	Eastern Cape	

== See also ==
- Transport in South Africa
- Numbered routes in South Africa
- Rail transport in South Africa
- Geography of South Africa
- List of rivers of South Africa
- List of crossings of the Orange River

== Notes and references ==
- Nicolas Janberg. "International Database for Civil and Structural Engineering". Structurae.com.
- Others references
