= R346 (South Africa) =

Regional route in South Africa

Regional route R346
- R346 route map

Route information
- Length: 91.7 km (57.0 mi)

Major junctions
- North end: N6 in Stutterheim
- N2 / R63 in Qonce; R102 near Zwelitsha; M25 near Machibi; M5 near King Phalo Airport
- South end: R72 near King Phalo Airport

Location
- Country: South Africa

Highway system
- Numbered routes of South Africa
← R345	→ R347

The R346 is a Regional Route in Eastern Cape, South Africa that connects Stutterheim with East London Airport via Qonce.

== Route ==
Its northern terminus is a junction with the N6 at Stutterheim. It heads south-south-west through Braunschweig to Qonce, where it enters as Alexander Avenue and meets the N2 and the R63 at the four-way junction with Maitland Road. All three routes join to become the road westwards (Grey Street) up to the Buffalo Road junction, where the N2 & R63 become Buffalo Road northwards while the R346 becomes Buffalo Road southwards.

The R346 leaves the town heading south-south-east to pass through Zwelitsha, where it meets the R102 to Phakamisa and crosses the Buffalo River. It continues south, then east (meeting the M25 to Kidd's Beach), to reach a T-junction with the M5 (Buffalo Pass). The R346 takes over as the Buffalo Pass and heads southwards to reach its end at a junction with the R72 approximately 2 kilometres west of King Phalo Airport in East London.
