= Van Stadens Wild Flower Reserve =

Van Stadens River Wild Flower Reserve
- Coordinates: 33.9077°S 25.2100°E
- Area: 500 ha (1,200 acres)
- Established: Proclamation - 1951; 75 years ago; Establishment of reserve - 1960; 66 years ago; Description of boundaries - April 10, 1963; 62 years ago; Change to wild flower reserve - June 20, 1964; 61 years ago
- Website: nmbt.co.za/listing/van_stadens_wild_flower_reserve.html
- Van Stadens Wild Flower Reserve (South Africa)

The Van Stadens River Wild Flower Reserve (Afrikaans: Van Stadens-veldblomreservaat) near Port Elizabeth, Eastern Cape, South Africa, is one of the oldest nature reserves in the country.

== Location ==
The park covers 600 hectares and lies 40 km west of Port Elizabeth, on an old stretch at the top of Van Stadens Pass. The Van Stadens River forms the western border, the N2 road runs through the area, and from here one has a good view of the gorge of the River, the Van Stadens Bridge, and northeast toward the Lady Slipper Trail. The reserve was founded in 1951 and is owned by the Nelson Mandela Bay Municipality.

== Uses ==
The main purpose of the reserve is to grow unique, indigenous plants, but it is also used as a centre for environmental education. A traditional Xhosa hut, household articles, and a kraal with farm equipment give insight into Xhosa culture. There is also an arboretum and a plant nursery there. Walking, hiking, and mountain biking trails as well as picnic areas are available.

== Flora and fauna ==
Cape fynbos is the natural biome here. Many species of proteas, orchids, and Erica can be found, as well as succulent plants and rare cycads. The lily Cyrtanthus stadensis is endemic to the park. Among the 60 species of trees found here is the rare Cape wing-nut (Atalaya capensis), only growing here, in the surrounding mountains, and near Suurberg Pass. There is also a large grove of Cape chestnut, Colodendrum capense. Notable fauna include the threatened Cape dwarf chameleon and certain species of frog. 170 species of birds have been spotted here.

== Rock art ==
The park is generally held to contain the southernmost rock art in Africa.

== Sources ==
- Logie, Bartle. Governor's travels. A journey along the Kouga/Tsitsikamma coast. Hunters Retreat: Bluecliff, 1999. ISBN 0-620-24152-7
- www.nmbt.co.za
- www.pembba.co.za
- www.vanstadens.co.za
