= R61 (South Africa) =

Road in South Africa

Provincial route R61

Route information
- Maintained by WCDTPW, SANRAL and ECDRPW
- Length: 1,061 km (659 mi)

Major junctions
- West end: N1 / N12 in Beaufort West
- N9 in Aberdeen; R63 in Graaff-Reinet; N9 near Bethesdaweg; N10 in Cradock; R67 in Komani; N6 in Komani; N6 southeast of Komani; R58 in Ngcobo; N2 in Mthatha
- East end: N2 in Port Shepstone

Location
- Country: South Africa
- Major cities: Beaufort West; Aberdeen; Graaff-Reinet; Cradock; Tarkastad; Komani; Ngcobo; Mthatha; Libode; Port St. Johns; Bizana; Port Edward; Margate; Port Shepstone

Highway system
- Numbered routes of South Africa
← R60	→ R62

The R61 is a long provincial route in South Africa that connects Beaufort West with Port Shepstone via Graaff-Reinet, Komani (previously Queenstown), Mthatha and Port Edward.

The R61 is co-signed with the N9 for 103 kilometres from Aberdeen through Graaff-Reinet to Bethesdaweg, and with the N6 for 18 kilometres near Queenstown.

== Route ==
Detailed Route

=== KwaZulu-Natal ===
The R61 begins in Port Shepstone at the Marburg interchange with the N2 highway from Durban (at the Oribi Toll Plaza). As the N2 leaves the freeway at an off-ramp and becomes the road westwards towards Harding and Kokstad, the R61 takes over as the freeway south-south-west through the KwaZulu-Natal South Coast. As the 1st section is maintained by SANRAL, the R61 is a toll road for 22 km from the N2 Interchange, through Shelly Beach, Margate and Ramsgate, up to Southbroom. At Southbroom, it stops being both a toll road and a freeway. From Port Shepstone to Southbroom, the R61 is followed by the R620 route.

From Southbroom, the R61 resumes south-south-west for 25 kilometres to Port Edward. Just after Port Edward, the R61 leaves the KwaZulu-Natal Province and crosses the Mtamvuna River via the C. H. Mitchell Bridge into the Eastern Cape Province.

=== Eastern Cape ===
From the provincial boundary (Mtamvuna River), the R61 heads north-west for 50 km to the town of Bizana, which it bypasses to the south. From Bizana, the R61 continues westwards for 25 kilometres to reach a junction with the R394 road, where the R61 turns southwards and heads for 70 kilometres, through Flagstaff, to the town of Lusikisiki. It continues southwards for 40 kilometres to cross the Mzimvubu River and reach a junction just north of the town of Port St. Johns. It bends to the west and heads 87 kilometres, bypassing Libode, to the city of Mthatha, where it crosses the Mthatha River and meets the N2 national route again in the city centre.

From Mthatha, the R61 heads westwards for 83 kilometres as the All Saints Neck Pass, bypassing Mthatha Airport, to the town of Ngcobo, where it meets the eastern terminus of the R58 road before turning to the south-south-west. After 45 kilometres, at the R409 intersection just north of Tsomo, the R61 turns to the west and heads for 80 kilometres, through Cofimvaba and Qamata (crossing the White Kei River), to reach a t-junction with the N6 national route. The R61 joins the N6 and they become one road north-west for 18 kilometres into the town of Komani (formerly Queenstown) as Louis Botha Road and Cathcart Street. At the roundabout with Barrable Street in Komani, the R61 becomes its own road west-south-west and after almost 2 kilometres, it meets the northern terminus of the R67 road at a roundabout. The R61 heads westwards for 136 kilometres, through Tarkastad, to the town of Cradock, where it meets the N10 national route. The R61 & N10 are one road northwards through the town centre of Cradock, continuing by a left turn (Commissioner Street), a right turn (JA Calata Street) and another left turn, to cross the Great Fish River.

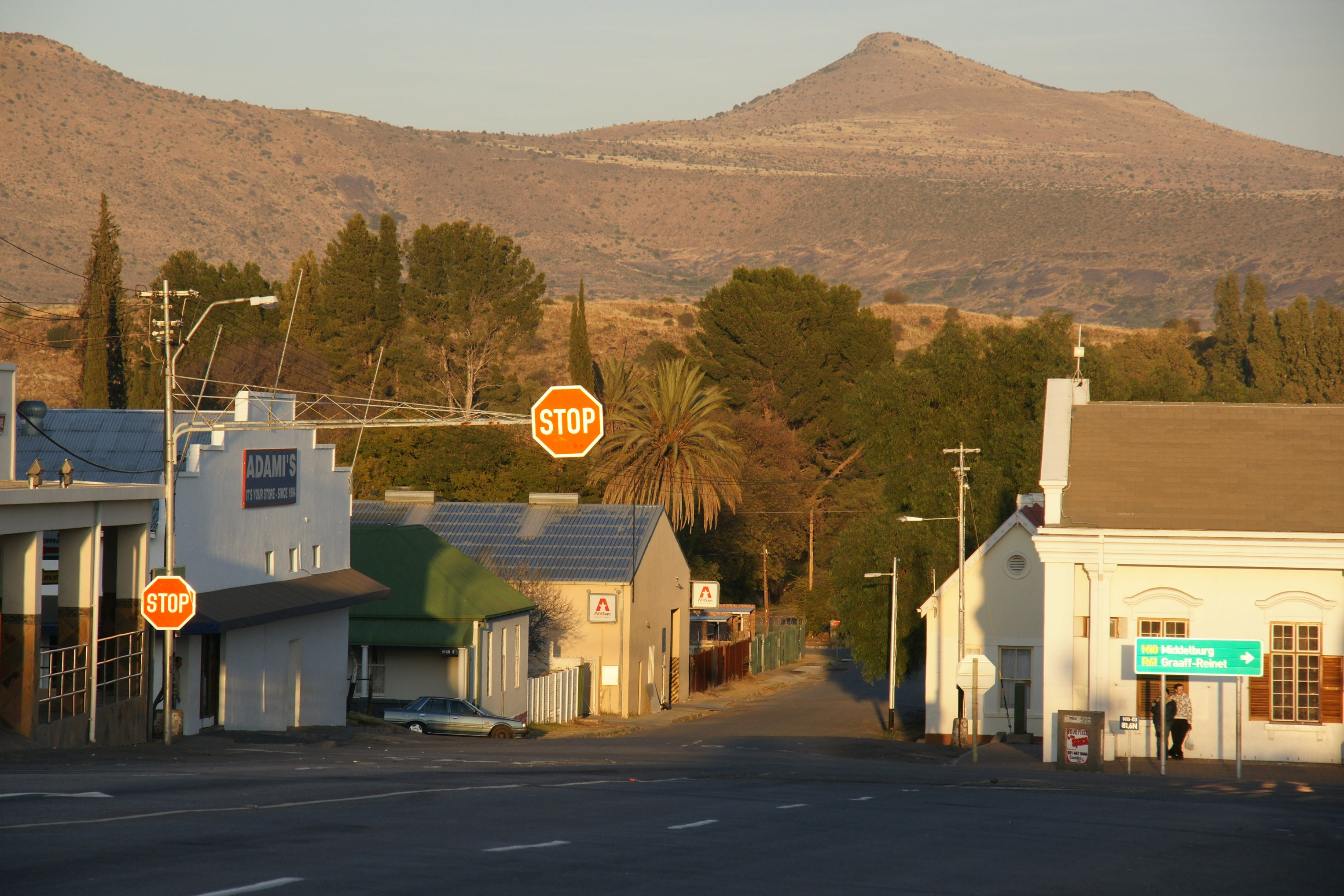
A junction in Cradock

They remain as one road for another 4.5 km west-north-west before the R61 becomes its own road westwards. The R61 continues for 85 kilometres as the Wapadsberg Pass, bypassing the Mountain Zebra National Park, to reach a junction with the N9 national route south-east of Bethesdaweg. The R61 joins the N9 and they are one road southwards for 46 km into the town of Graaff-Reinet, where they meet and are co-signed for a few kilometres with the R63 route, crossing the Sundays River. From Graaff-Reinet, the R61 & N9 remain as one road west-south-west for 55 km up to the town of Aberdeen. At the 4-way-junction with Hoop Street (R338), the R61 stops co-signing with the N9 and becomes the road westwards from this junction.

From Aberdeen, the R61 heads westwards for 148 kilometres, crossing into the Western Cape Province, to enter the town of Beaufort West and reach its western terminus at a junction with the N1 and N12 national route co-signage.

== Wild Coast Highway ==
There are plans to give the first section of the R61, from its starting junction with the N2 in Port Shepstone to its other junction with the N2 in Mthatha, to the N2 national route. The project was initially scheduled for completion in 2024. Together with the existing N2 from Mthatha to East London, this route will be named the "Wild Coast Toll Route".

While it will take over most of the R61's route, this new Wild Coast Highway of the N2 will be realigned in two places (on either side of Lusikisiki), referred to as the greenfields sections. One of the two greenfields sections will provide a shorter and more direct route between Lusikisiki and Port Edward (via the Mtentu Bridge and Msikaba Bridge) while the current R61 passes through Flagstaff and Bizana on the route between those two towns. The other greenfields section will be a realignment between Lusikisiki and Ndwalane (just outside of Port St. Johns) on the route to Libode and Mthatha, also shortening the route. The new road between Lusikisiki and Port Edward will receive a tollgate, namely the Mthentu Toll Plaza, while the realigned section outside of Port St. Johns will also receive a tollgate, namely the Ndwalane Toll Plaza. The overall distance between Port Shepstone and Mthatha will be 85 km shorter than the current N2 and 69 km shorter than the current R61.

Once the N2 Wild Coast Toll Route is complete, the existing 320 kilometre section of the R61 from Port Shepstone via Port Edward, Bizana, Flagstaff, Lusikisiki and Libode to Mthatha will no-longer be designated as the R61. The existing sections of the R61 from Port Shepstone to the C. H. Mitchell Bridge after Port Edward and from Ndwalane to Mthatha, together with the new greenfields sections, will be designated as the N2.

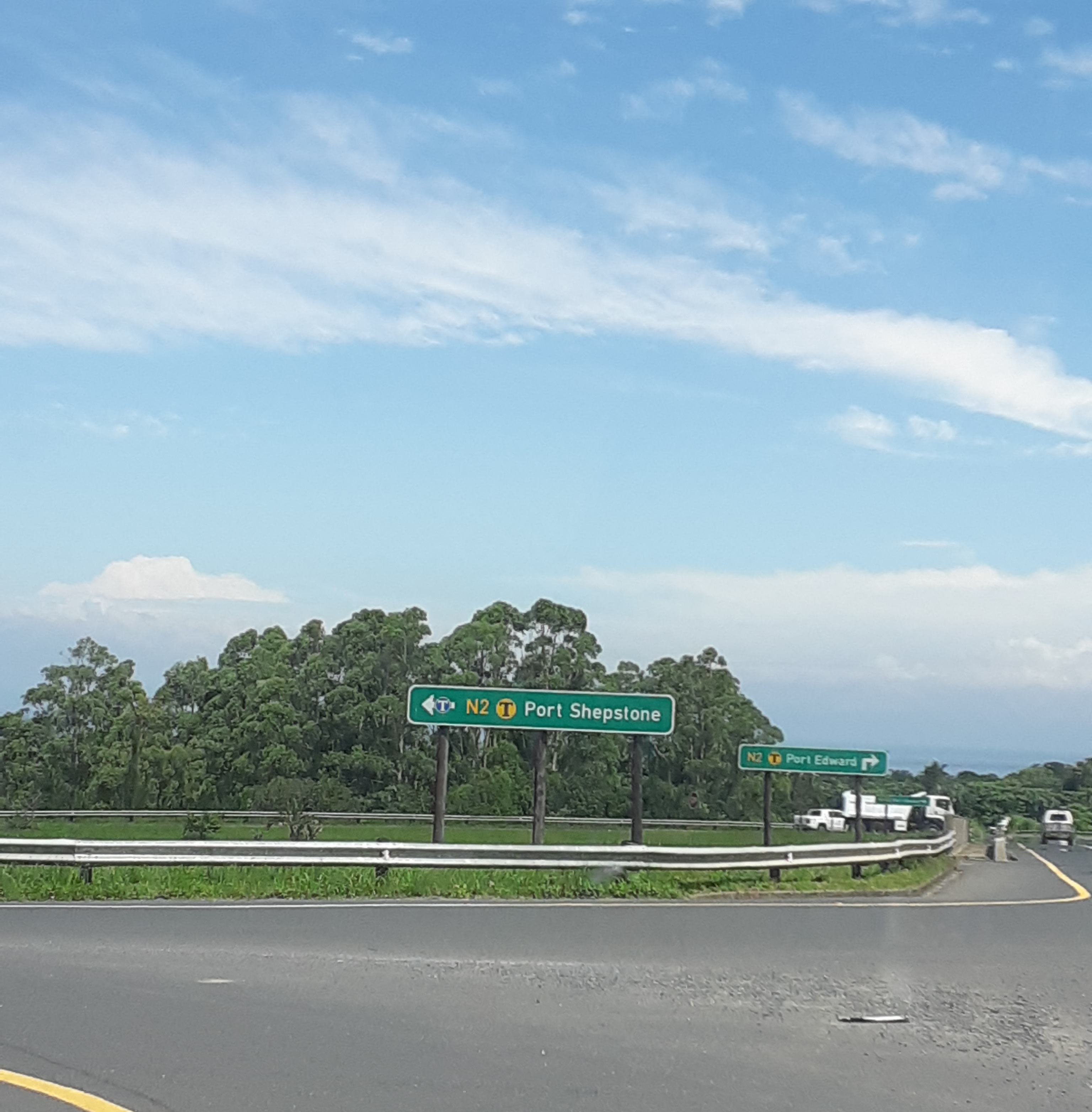
Board signs indicating the N2 to Port Shepstone and Port Edward

As of 2021, the road classification numbers on the board signs on the R61 between Port Shepstone and Port Edward have already been changed to signs indicating the N2 as part of the Wild Coast Highway Project, indicating that the freeway from the Oribi Toll Plaza (Marburg Interchange) in Port Shepstone southwards will no-longer be designated as the R61. Also, works are being done on the greenfields sections of the new Wild Coast Highway (including at the Msikaba Bridge and Mtentu Bridge sites) as of August 2024.

== See also ==
- Wapadsberg Pass
- R306 (Eastern Cape) - connecting road
- N2 Wild Coast Toll Route
