= R407 road =

R407 road may refer to:

- R407 road (Ireland)
- R407 road (South Africa)
