= R405 road =

R405 road may refer to:

- R405 road (Ireland)
- R405 road (South Africa)
