= R406 road =

R406 road may refer to:

- R406 road (Ireland)
- R406 road (South Africa)
