= R347 road =

R347 road may refer to:

- R347 road (Ireland)
- R347 road (South Africa)
