= R394 road =

R394 road may refer to:

- R394 road (Ireland)
- R394 road (South Africa)
