= C. H. Mitchell Bridge =

Bridge between KwaZulu-Natal and the Eastern Cape, South Africa

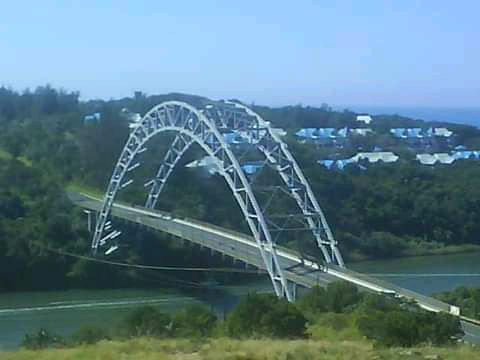
- The C. H. Mitchell bridge over the Mtamvuna River
- Coordinates: 31°04′31″S 30°11′33″E
- Carries: Provincial Route 61
- Crosses: Mtamvuna River
- Locale: KwaZulu-Natal, South Africa
- Other name: Mtamvuna Bridge

Characteristics
- Design: Arch bridge
- Material: Steel
- Total length: 210 metres (690 ft)
- Height: 35 metres (115 ft)
- No. of spans: 206 metres (676 ft)

History
- Opened: 1966; 60 years ago

Location
- Interactive map of C. H. Mitchell Bridge

The C. H. Mitchell bridge, also known as the Mtamvuna bridge, is the second longest single span bridge in South Africa. The bridge's deck is suspended by a pair of cable hangers systems, which are supported by a cross-braced double steel arch. It is 206 metres (676 ft) in length and the highest point on its arch is 35 metres (115 ft) above the roadway.

The bridge is located south of Port Edward and spans the Mtamvuna River. It connects KwaZulu-Natal to the Eastern Cape and is one of the largest truss arch bridges in South Africa. It is located on the R61 Route (future N2 Wild Coast Toll Route).

== History ==
The bridge was constructed in 1966 and is similar in design to the Fredrikstad Bridge in Norway. It replaced a ferry crossing that had been in operation since 1943. The ferry crossing was originally located about 1 km (0.62 mi) from the mouth of the river but was moved further upstream. In 1963 JBH were awarded the R. 535,000 contract for the construction of the new bridge. It was constructed from corten steel, which is known for its increased resistance to atmospheric corrosion. It was formally handed over to the Public Works Department on 9 September 1966 and opened at the end of that year. The South African Institute of Civil Engineers awarded it the 'Outstanding Civil Engineering Achievement' for 1966. The bridge was named after a local pioneer, Charles Henry Mitchell, the father of Douglas Edgar Mitchell (1896–1988), MP for Natal South Coast (1948-1972).

The bridge underwent substantial refurbishment and modifications between 2000 and 2001. In the late evening on 27 November 2002 the bridge was significantly damaged by two explosive devices which were detonated on the Eastern Cape side of the bridge. The bombings were later attributed to the Boeremag, a right-wing terrorist organisation, with white separatist aims. The explosions damaged the steel arch structure as well as its two supports, and the bridge was closed to traffic for three weeks whilst being repaired. The bridge repair received a South African Institute of Civil Engineers award in the technical category in 2006.

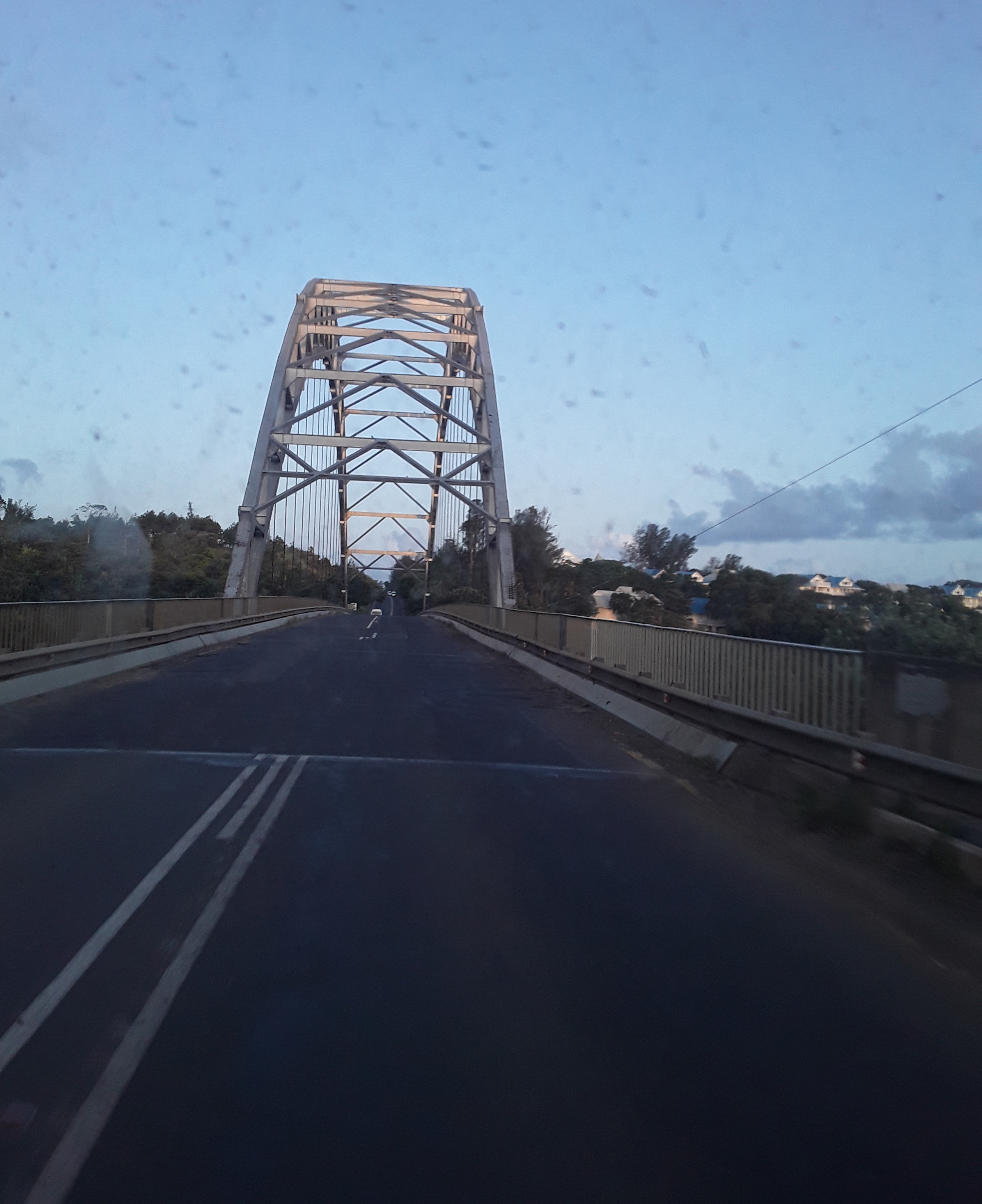
Road access to the bridge

== Developments ==
As part of the N2 Wild Coast Toll Route project, a second bridge across the Mthamvuna River will be constructed. This bridge will form part of a proposed 5 km long dual-carriageway on the new N2.

== See also ==
- List of arch bridges by length
- List of bridges in South Africa
