= R408 road =

R408 road may refer to:

- R408 road (Ireland)
- R408 road (South Africa)
