= M1 (East London) =

Metropolitan route in the City of East London, South Africa

Metropolitan route M1

Route information
- Maintained by Buffalo City Metropolitan Municipality
- Length: 9.8 km (6.1 mi)

Major junctions
- From: R72 in East London CBD
- M15 in East London CBD; M4 in Southernwood; M5 in Vincent; N2 in Vincent
- To: M11 in Dorchester Heights

Location
- Country: South Africa

Highway system
- Numbered routes of South Africa
→ M3

The M1 is a short metropolitan route in East London, South Africa.

== Route ==
The M1 begins at the intersection with the R72 in the East London CBD as 'Oxford Street' and runs north-northwest through the suburbs of North End, Belgravia and Southernwood. As it enters the suburb of Selborne it becomes 'Union Avenue' turning north-east and running parallel with the railway. It then enters Vincent where it intersects with Bell Road at a traffic circle and becomes 'Western Avenue'. It turns northwards and then north-eastwards before crossing over the N2 freeway which connects to Mthatha and King William's Town at the exit 1047 off-ramp north of Vincent. It ends at the M11 in Dorchester Heights.
