= R405 (South Africa) =

Regional route in South Africa

Regional route R405

Location
- Country: South Africa

Highway system
- Numbered routes of South Africa
← R404	→ R406

The R405 is a Regional Route in South Africa. Its southern terminus is the N2 at Mount Frere in the Eastern Cape. It runs north-west to meet the R56 midway between Mount Fletcher and Matatiele.
