= Prince Albert Road =

- Location within Western Cape Location within South Africa
- Coordinates: 32°59′04″S 21°41′13″E
- Country: South Africa
- Province: Western Cape
- District: Central Karoo
- Municipality: Prince Albert

Population
  - Total: 103
- Time zone: UTC+2 (SAST)
- PO box: 6931
- Area code: 023

Prince Albert Road is a village located in Laingsburg Local Municipality, Western Cape.

== History ==
The village of Prince Albert Road owes its existence to the route chosen by Prime Minister John Molteno, in 1872, for the Cape Government Railways's western main line and its stations, from Cape Town to the diamond fields at Kimberley.

A railway station was built at this particular point due partly to its location roughly halfway between Beaufort West and Laingsburg, and a road was run to service the town of Prince Albert, at the foot of the Swartberg mountains, 40 km to the south. This road was therefore named Prince Albert Road (now the R407), and the railway station was likewise named "Prince Albert Road". Soon, a small hamlet developed around the station; from this, the modern village grew.

In 1886 a coach-service connected Prince Albert Road to Oudtshoorn far to the south, and village's mud-walled kraals served as an occasional market and trading point for the farmers of the surrounding district.

== Attractions ==
It is today known for its fossil trails in the surrounding Karoo. The artist Jan Schoeman ("Outa Lappies") was possibly the town's most famous resident. He was an artist, recycler, and philosopher, who was voted as the Western Cape Tourism Personality of the Year in 2000. He died on July 7, 2011.
