= Wapadsberg Pass =

Mountain pass in South Africa

Coordinates: 31°55′51.8″S 24°53′01.4″E

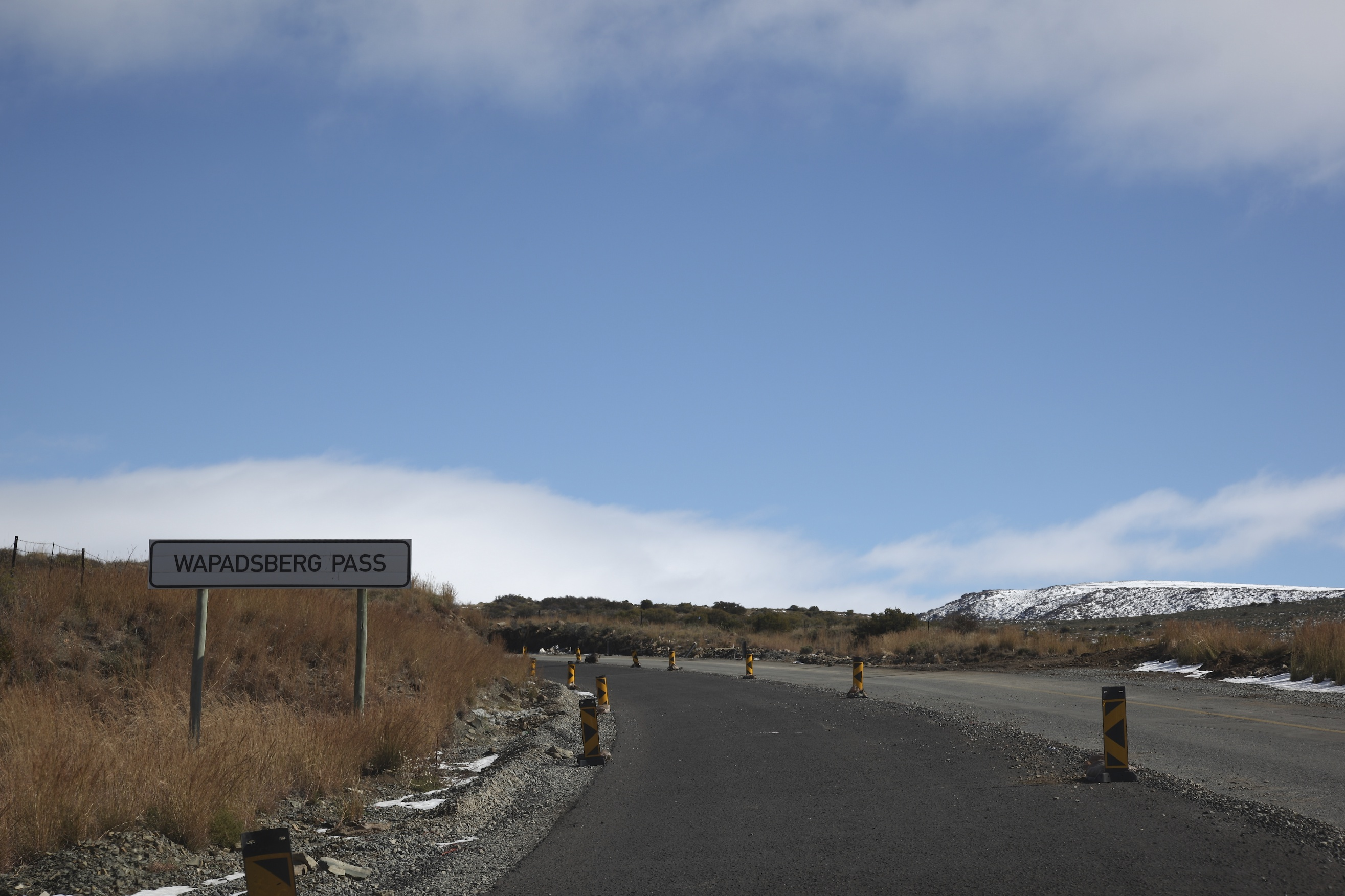
The Wapadsberg Pass

Wapadsberg Pass (English: Wagon Trail Pass) is a mountain pass situated in the Eastern Cape province of South Africa, on the regional road R61, between Nieu-Bethesda and Cradock. It is located 17 km east of the R61's junction with the N9. It is named after the Wapadberg (a section of the Sneeuberg mountain range) which it traverses. The Xhosa name for this pass is 'eGolokoqo, an onomatopoeic rendering of the crunching of wagon wheels on the primitive tracks of the 19th century.
