= R347 (South Africa) =

Regional route in South Africa

Regional route R347
- R347 route map

Location
- Country: South Africa

Highway system
- Numbered routes of South Africa
← R346	→ R349

The R347 is a Regional Route in South Africa that connects Strydenburg with the R369 to Hopetown and Prieska. There was another unconnected route R347 located in Eastern Cape Province which has since been re-signed as the M25.
