= Van Stadens Pass =

Mountain pass in South Africa

Coordinates: 33°54′46.2″S 25°12′09.0″E

External image
- Van Stadens Pass prior to 1904, from Uitenhage, past and present : souvenir of the Centenary, 1804–1904

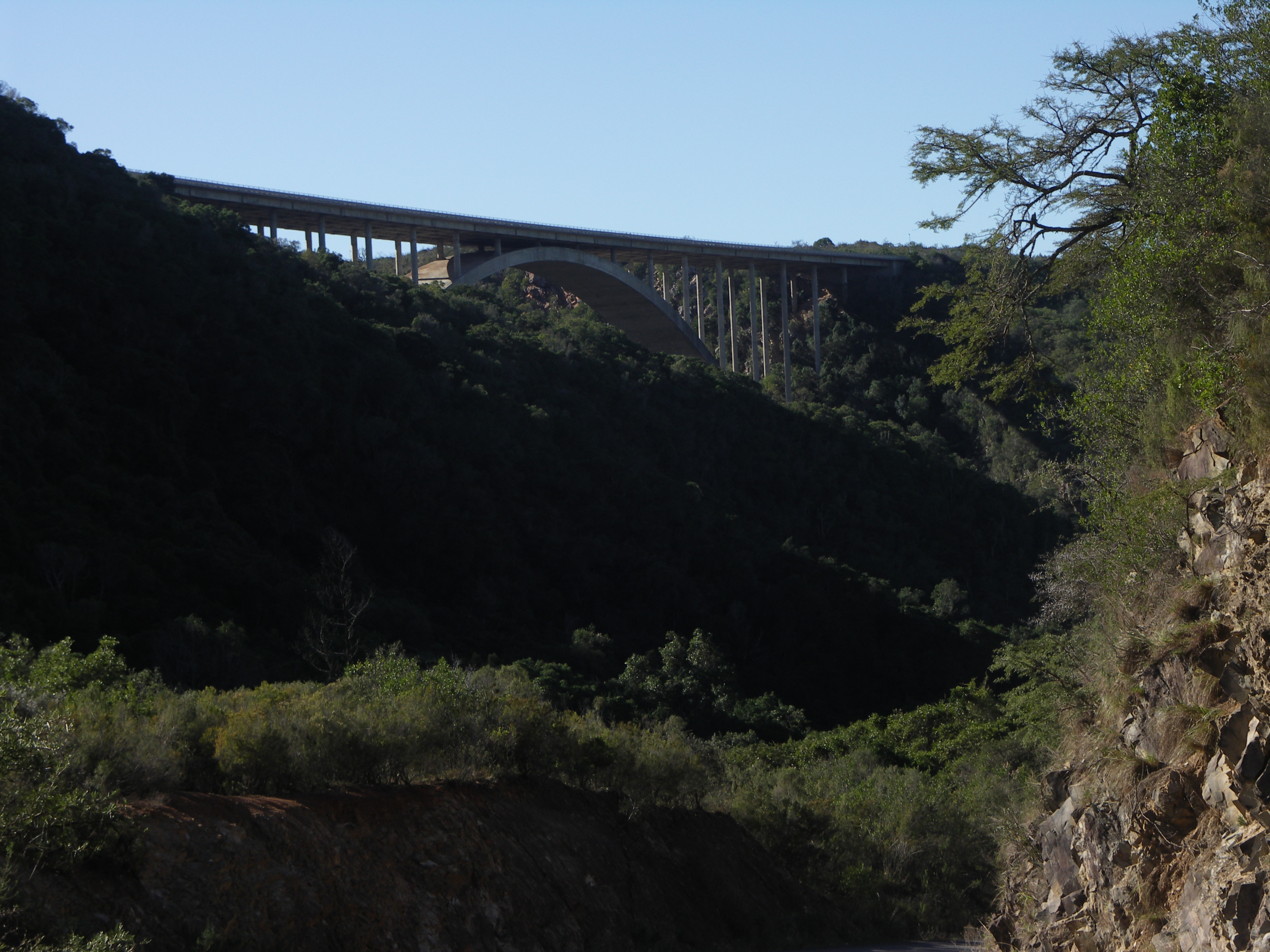
The N2 Van Stadens Bridge seen from within the Van Stadens Pass

Van Stadens Pass is situated in the Eastern Cape, province of South Africa, on the R102 regional route, between Port Elizabeth and Humansdorp. It is a passage through the gorge of the Van Stadens River.
