= All Saints Neck =

Mountain pass in South Africa

Coordinates: 31°40′36.1″S 28°00′45.8″E

All Saints Neck, is a mountain pass situated in the Eastern Cape province of South Africa, on the R61 provincial road between Mthatha and Ngcobo.
