= Van Stadensriviermond =

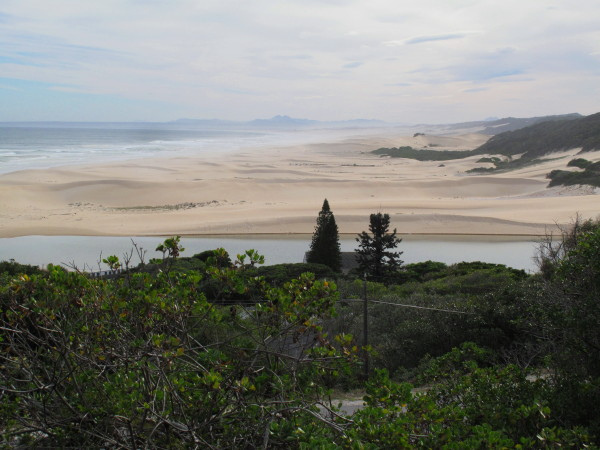
- Van Stadens Mouth

- Location within Eastern Cape Location within South Africa
- Coordinates: 33.968°S 25.228°E
- Country: South Africa
- Province: Eastern Cape
- Municipality: Nelson Mandela Bay
- Time zone: UTC+2 (SAST)

Van Stadensriviermond is a coastal resort about 15 km east of the mouth of the Gamtoos River and 10 km south of Van Stadensberg west of Port Elizabeth. Afrikaans for 'Van Staden's river mouth', it takes its name from its position. The Van Stadens River and the mountain are said to have been named after Marthinus van Staden, who owned a loan-farm there about 1744.
