= Phakamisa, Eastern Cape =

Phakamisa
- Location within Eastern Cape Location within South Africa
- Coordinates: 32.9349°S 27.4570°E
- Country: South Africa
- Province: Eastern Cape
- Municipality: Buffalo City

Area
  - Total: 2.32 km^{2} (0.90 sq mi)

Population (2011)
  - Total: 6,602
  - Density: 2,850/km^{2} (7,370/sq mi)

Racial makeup (2011)
  - Black African: 99.6%
  - Other: 0.3%

First languages (2011)
  - Xhosa: 94.6%
  - English: 2.4%
  - Other: 3.0%
- Time zone: UTC+2 (SAST)
- Postal code (street): 5620
- PO box: 5620

Phakamisa is a settlement situated southeast of Qonce. It falls under Buffalo City Metropolitan Municipality in the Eastern Cape province of South Africa.
