= R394 (South Africa) =

Regional route in South Africa

Regional route R394
- R394 route map

Route information
- Length: 33.5 km (20.8 mi)

Major junctions
- South end: R61 in Magusheni
- North end: N2 in Brook's Nek

Location
- Country: South Africa

Highway system
- Numbered routes of South Africa
← R393	→ R396

The R394 is a Regional Route in South Africa. Its southern terminus is the R61 at Magusheni. From there, it heads north-west to where the N2 enters KwaZulu-Natal at Brook's Nek (south-west of Kokstad).
