= Iswepe =

- Location within Mpumalanga Location within South Africa
- Coordinates: 26°50′06″S 30°31′57″E
- Country: South Africa
- Province: Mpumalanga
- District: Gert Sibande
- Municipality: Mkhondo

Area
  - Total: 2.93 km^{2} (1.13 sq mi)

Population (2011)
  - Total: 2,833
  - Density: 967/km^{2} (2,500/sq mi)

Racial makeup (2011)
  - Black African: 97.8%
  - Coloured: 0.4%
  - Indian/Asian: 0.7%
  - White: 0.8%
  - Other: 0.3%

First languages (2011)
  - Zulu: 92.3%
  - S. Ndebele: 2.2%
  - English: 2.0%
  - Afrikaans: 1.2%
  - Other: 2.3%
- Time zone: UTC+2 (SAST)
- PO box: 2382

Iswepe, officially Insephe, is a village and railway siding in Gert Sibande District Municipality in the Mpumalanga province of South Africa.
