= R406 (South Africa) =

Regional route in South Africa

Regional route R406
- R406 route map

Route information
- Length: 64 km (40 mi)

Major junctions
- West end: N2 near Caledon
- East end: N2 near Riviersonderend

Location
- Country: South Africa
- Towns: Genadendal; Greyton

Highway system
- Numbered routes of South Africa
← R405	→ R407

The R406 is a Regional Route in South Africa that connects Greyton and Genadendal with the N2.
