= N2 (South Africa) =

National road in South Africa

National route N2

- N2 sign in Cape Town CBD, indicating southbound onramp towards Cape Town International Airport

Route information
- Maintained by SANRAL, City of Cape Town Metropolitan Municipality
- Length: 2,255 km (1,401 mi)

Major junctions
- West end: M62 in Cape Town
- N1 in Cape Town; N9 / N12 near George; N10 near Coega; N6 in East London; N3 in Durban
- East end: N11 / N17 in Ermelo

Location
- Country: South Africa
- Provinces: Western Cape; Eastern Cape; KwaZulu-Natal; Mpumalanga
- Major cities: Cape Town; Somerset West; Caledon; Swellendam; Riversdale; Mossel Bay; George; Knysna; Jeffreys Bay; Humansdorp; Gqeberha; Makhanda; Peddie; Qonce; East London; Butterworth; Idutywa; Mthatha; Port St. Johns (future N2); Lusikisiki (future N2); Qumbu (current N2); Mount Frere (current N2); Kokstad (current N2); Port Edward (future N2); Margate (future N2); Port Shepstone; Durban; KwaDukuza; Richards Bay; Empangeni; Pongola; Piet Retief; Ermelo

Highway system
- Numbered routes of South Africa
← N1	→ N3

The N2 is a national route in South Africa that runs from Cape Town through George, Gqeberha, East London, Mthatha, Port Shepstone and Durban to Ermelo. It is the main highway along the Indian Ocean coast of the country. Its current length of 2,255 kilometres (1,401 mi) makes it the longest numbered route in South Africa.

Prior to 1970, the N2 designation only applied to the route from Cape Town to Durban.

There are plans to realign the N2 national route from Port Shepstone to Mthatha along a shorter stretch of road that passes through Port Edward, Lusikisiki and Port St. Johns. The project was initially scheduled for completion in 2024 and is expected to reduce the length of the route by 85 kilometres (53 mi). Combined with the existing N2 route from Mthatha to East London, the realigned route will form the Wild Coast Toll Route.

== Route ==
N2

=== Western Cape ===
==== Cape Metropole ====
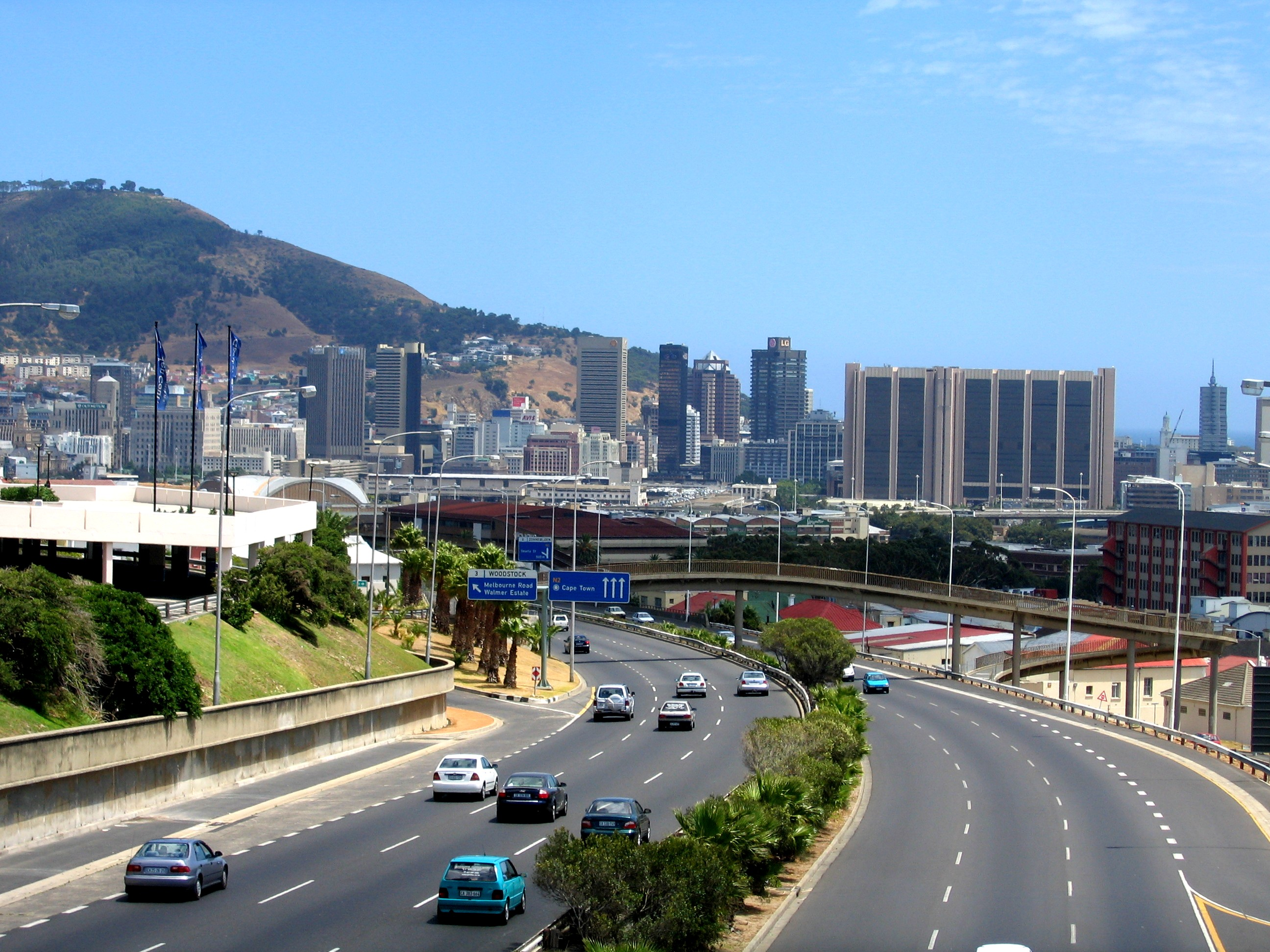
The N2, which is also known at this point as the Nelson Mandela Boulevard, as it enters the City Bowl of Cape Town.

The N2 begins in central Cape Town at the northern end of Buitengracht Street (M62), outside the entrance to the Victoria & Alfred Waterfront. The first section of the N2 is shared with the beginning of the N1; it is a four-lane elevated freeway that runs along a strip of land between the city centre and the Port of Cape Town. On the eastern edge of the city centre the two roads split, and the N2 turns south as Nelson Mandela Boulevard (formerly Eastern Boulevard), crossing above the yards and approach tracks of Cape Town railway station.

Leaving the Central Business District (CBD), the N2 descends to ground level after the R102 Christiaan Barnard on-ramp in Woodstock. Continuing roughly east-southeast, the N2 intersects a few roads in the Woodstock area, most notably Roodebloem Road, which provides access to the M4 Main Road and University Estate, located on the north-western slopes of Devil's Peak.

After leaving the Woodstock area, the N2 meets the M3 Phillip Kgosana Drive, from the southern City Bowl. Atop Mowbray Ridge in Observatory, these two roads merge into a massive 9-lane highway (5 lanes northwards and 4 lanes southwards) and bend around the University of Cape Town Medical Campus and Groote Schuur Hospital before splitting at the bottom of the ridge, with the M3 running toward the University of Cape Town and the Southern Suburbs. This intersection, called Hospital Bend, was the scene of frequent bottlenecks and accidents due to the lack of pre-selection lanes. However, this stretch of road has been extensively upgraded and made safer.

After Hospital Bend, the N2 heads east as Settler's Way and forms the border between Observatory and Mowbray, intersecting the M4 Main Road (westbound only), M57 Liesbeek Parkway, M5 Black River Parkway, and Raapenberg Road. After leaving the Southern Suburbs, the N2 travels across the Cape Flats as a six-lane freeway towards Somerset West. It travels just past the southern end of the main runway at Cape Town International Airport and crosses the M7 and R300 highways (both of which link the N2 with Mitchells Plain in the south and Bellville and Brackenfell in the north).

After the R300, the N2 becomes a four-lane freeway, passing nearby Khayelitsha and Macassar. It enters the Helderberg region where it passes through Somerset West and ceases to be a freeway after the R44 intersection, which links the N2 with Stellenbosch and the Winelands in the north. Here it passes through several intersections with traffic lights, which cause frequent congestion. After Somerset West, it bypasses Strand, Gordon's Bay, and Sir Lowry's Pass Village.

==== Overberg ====
After Sir Lowry's Pass Village, the N2 climbs Sir Lowry's Pass to enter the Overberg region. It passes near the town of Grabouw on the Hottentots-Holland plateau before descending the Houwhoek Pass to Botrivier. It then passes across the agricultural plains through the towns of Caledon, Riviersonderend, Swellendam and Riversdale to re-approach the coast at Mossel Bay, which marks the beginning of the Garden Route.

==== Garden Route ====
Just west of Mossel Bay, the N2 again becomes a divided freeway, and remains one as far as the intersection with the N9/N12 just outside George. From there, it travels across Kaaiman's Pass to Wilderness and on to Knysna and Plettenberg Bay.

After Plettenberg Bay, a section of the road is tolled as the Tsitsikamma Toll Route, primarily because of the Bloukrans Bridge (crossing the Bloukrans River). An alternative route (part of the R102) used to run through Nature's Valley but this was closed in November 2007 after flood damage. The Bloukrans Bridge marks the border with the Eastern Cape.

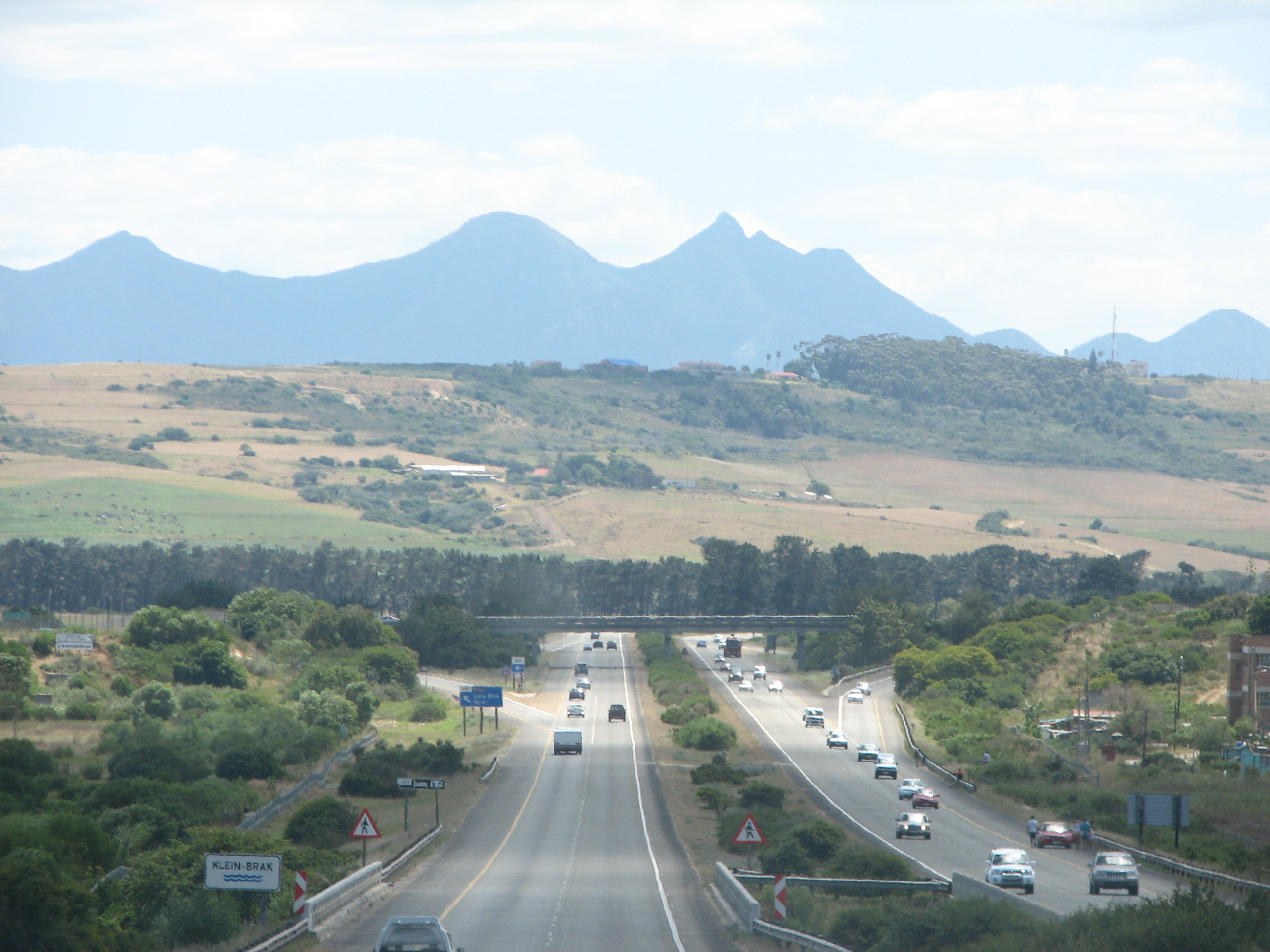
N2 Freeway between George and Mossel Bay

=== Eastern Cape ===
==== Sunshine Coast Road ====
After crossing the Bloukrans Bridge, the N2 becomes the Sunshine Coast Road, passing through the Southern edge of the Tsitsikamma Nature Reserve, and regains freeway status between Nompumelelo and Witsiebos.

It runs eastward as a two-lane single carriageway highway, bypassing the resort towns of Jeffreys Bay and St. Francis Bay, as well as the town of Humansdorp. It becomes a four-lane dual carriageway freeway at the Van Stadens Bridge, which marks its entrance into the Nelson Mandela Bay Municipality. It proceeds eastwards to the city of Gqeberha (formerly Port Elizabeth).

==== Nelson Mandela Bay ====
After the Van Stadens Bridge, the N2 meets the R102, which provides access to KwaNobuhle and Kariega (formerly Uitenhage) via the R334. It then enters Gqeberha as a four-lane dual carriageway freeway. It runs eastward past the suburbs of Kabega Park and Tulbargh before making a north-easterly turn just after the R102 Kragga Kamma Road/Cape Road intersection in More Grove.

It then bypasses the suburbs of Newton Park and Korsten before meeting the R75 at the Commercial Road Intersection, with the R75 linking to the Gqeberha city centre in the south and to Kariega and Graaff-Reinet in the north.

It then passes through northern Sidwell, intersecting the M8 Kempston Drive (which links with the New Brighton and KwaZakhele suburbs in the north), and the M4 Settlers Way Highway (which links the N2 with the CBD and Chief Dawid Stuurman International Airport in the south and the industrial areas of Deal Party in the north).

The N2 then leaves the city of Gqeberha running northwards towards Colchester, adjacent to the Indian Ocean, first passing across the estuarine area of the Swartkops River before passing through Bluewater Bay. After Bluewater Bay, it meets the R335 (which provides access to Motherwell) and bypasses the Coega Special Economic Zone (SEZ), with a major intersection with Neptune Road linking the harbour with the N2. It loses freeway status after the R334 Addo South Gate intersection, and becomes a two-lane single-carriageway highway after passing through Colchester.

==== Colchester - Qonce ====
After Colchester, the N2 leaves the Nelson Mandela Bay Metropolitan Municipality and turns north-eastwards, meeting the southern terminus of the N10 (which heads northwards towards Middelburg) and the western terminus of the R72 (an alternative route to East London) before moving away from the coast towards Makhanda.

After passing around Grahamstown (also known as Makhanda) on a bypass, the N2 passes through the former Ciskei, including Peddie, to enter the Buffalo City Metropolitan Municipality.

==== Buffalo City (Qonce- East London) ====
At Qonce (King William's Town) in Buffalo City, it meets the R63 and after several traffic-light intersections, the N2 turns east-south-east towards the coast, meeting it at East London.

The N2 becomes a four-lane dual carriageway road after leaving Qonce, and regains freeway status at the La Rochelle Street intersection in Berlin, just outside East London. It runs past Fort Jackson and the Mdantsane township. It then enters the city of East London as it passes to the north of Amalinda. After the M4 Amalinda Main Road intersection, it runs north of Vincent, intersecting the M1 Western Avenue (which links the CBD to the outlying rural areas situated along the Nahoon River). It then descends into the Nahoon River Valley, meeting the southern terminus of the N6 and the eastern terminus of the R72 after just crossing the Nahoon River.

The N2 then passes through Beacon Bay, partially intersecting the M8 Beacon Bay Road, and exits the city of East London before bypassing Gonubie to the north of the city. The N2 then becomes a two-lane single-carriageway highway after the R102/M10 Main Road intersection (Gonubie Interchange), which is also the proposed start of the Wild Coast Toll Road. It then continues as a freeway until shortly after the R102 Brakfontein intersection, after which it leaves the Buffalo City Metro.

==== Former Transkei ====
After East London, the N2 turns again towards the interior in a northeasterly direction to avoid the difficult terrain of the Wild Coast. It passes through the former Transkei and its former capital, Mthatha, where it meets the R61 route (an alternative route to Port Shepstone). There are plans for the N2 to run as a four-lane dual carriageway highway from Viedgesville to the Ngqeleni Village turn off, bypassing Mthatha to the south, and then continuing eastwards on the R61, as part of the N2 Wild Coast Toll Road. After passing Mthatha, the N2 continues north-east through the towns of Qumbu, Mount Frere (KwaBhaca) and Mount Ayliff. Near Kokstad, the N2 climbs Brook's Nek to enter the province of KwaZulu-Natal.

=== KwaZulu-Natal ===
==== Brooks Nek - Port Shepstone ====
The N2 enters KwaZulu-Natal atop Brooks Nek, after which it bypasses Kokstad to the south and meets the R56 from Matatiele. The N2 and the R56 are co-signed for 43 kilometres (27 mi) eastwards until which the R56 splits from the N2 at Stafford's Post. The N2 then runs east-south-east past the rural towns of Harding and Izingolweni (eZinqoleni), to enter Port Shepstone from the west through its suburb of Marburg, meeting the eastern terminus of the R61 highway (an alternative route from Mthatha) at the Oribi Toll Plaza (Marburg Interchange). This interchange with the R61 is to be the eastern end of the N2 Wild Coast Toll Route from East London via Mthatha and Port Edward.

==== Port Shepstone - Durban (South Coast Highway) ====
The N2 then turns to the north at the Oribi Toll Plaza to become the South Coast Highway (taking over from the R61), first running as a dual carriageway freeway for 4 km (2.5 mi), then losing dual carriageway status after the Umtentweni off-ramp (where it ceases to be a toll road), before regaining dual carriageway status just after Hibberdene. It passes through the rural areas of Southern KwaZulu-Natal, with the rural towns of Mthwalume, Umzinto and Dududu, and the resort towns of Pennington, Park Rynie and Scottburgh lying to the west and east of the N2, respectively.

==== eThekwini Metropolitan Area (Durban) ====
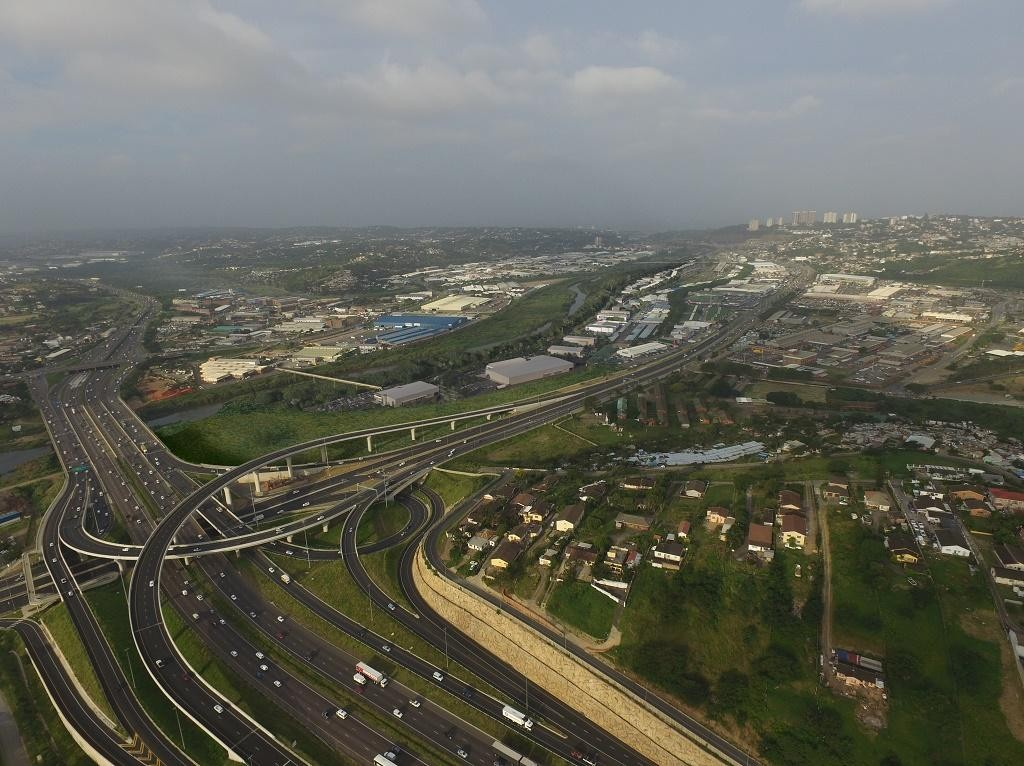
The Umgeni Interchange

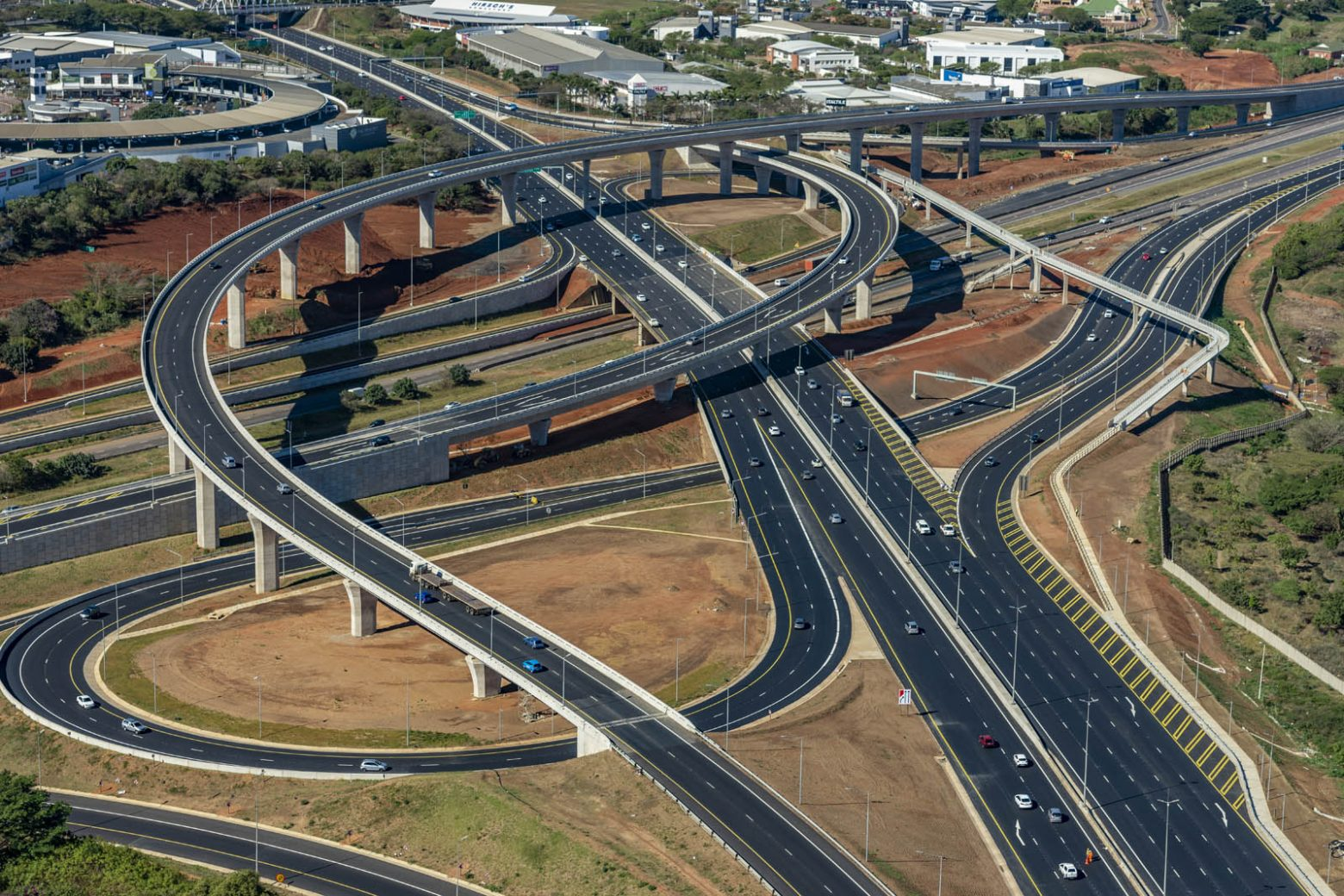
The Mount Edgecombe Interchange

The N2 enters the eThekwini Metropolitan Area 60 km (37 mi) south of Durban as a dual carriageway freeway just north of Scottburgh. It runs past the towns of Umkomaas (eMkhomazi) and Umgababa, before entering the built-up urban area of eThekwini at Kingsburgh and Amanzimtoti. It runs past Isipingo and the old Durban International Airport, before meeting the southern terminus of the M4 freeway at Umlazi; with the M4 providing access to the Durban CBD.

After the M4 interchange, the N2 runs as an eight-lane dual carriageway freeway around the city of Durban known as the Outer Ring Road, bypassing the suburbs of Mobeni, Chatsworth, Sarnia, Ridgeview and Chesterville, with the M1 Higginson Highway intersection and the M7 Solomon Mahlangu Drive interchange providing access to these suburbs as well as the town of Queensburgh.

After leaving Chesterville, the N2 meets the N3 highway at the EB Cloete Interchange (locally known as Spaghetti Junction) at Westville. It then passes through the suburbs of Clare Hills and Reservoir Hills, meeting the M19 Umgeni Drive at a large intersection just outside of Reservoir Hills.

It then continues northwards past Parlock, Riverhorse Valley, Briardene and Sea Cow Lake, with the M43 Queen Nandi Drive and the R102 KwaMashu Highway providing access to these places, thereafter exiting the city of Durban and continuing towards Mount Edgecombe and uMhlanga, meeting the M41 at the Mount Edgecombe Interchange where the Durban Outer Ring Road ends.

It then runs to the east of Verulam and to the west of eMdloti (formerly Umdloti), passing by the King Shaka International Airport in La Mercy (where the M65 provides access). The airport off-ramp marks the beginning of the KwaZulu-Natal North Coast Toll Road. After the airport, it is tolled at oThongathi (formerly Tongaat) before leaving eThekwini.

==== North Coast Highway ====
After eThekwini, the N2 runs toward Mtunzini, passing through Ballito before being tolled again at the Mvoti Toll Plaza before KwaDukuza (formerly Stanger). It meets the R74 near KwaDukuza. It then continues as a four-lane single carriageway highway and passes through sugar cane plantations on the KwaZulu-Natal North Coast. It is tolled for the final time at Mtunzini and meets the R34, which provides access to Richards Bay to the east and Empangeni and Ulundi to the west.

Just after the R34 off-ramp, the N2 ceases to be a dual carriageway and turns north, moving away from the coast into the heart of Zululand, where it bypasses Greater St Lucia Wetlands Park to the west (where the R618 provides access) and runs past the town of Mkuze before turning to the north-west and running close to the border of Eswatini, passing the town of Pongola.

=== Mpumalanga ===
After leaving Pongola, the N2 makes a direct line for Piet Retief (eMkhondo) and meets the R33 to be co-signed with it as the main road through the town centre before splitting 12 km north of the town. It then heads north-west to Ermelo, where it enters as Voortrekker Lane and terminates at a junction with the N11 (De Emigratie Street) in the town centre, just south of the N11's intersection with the N17.

The total length of the road is 2,255 kilometres (1,401 mi).

== Junctions ==
=== Western Cape ===
Municipality	Location	km	mi	Exit	Destinations	Notes
Cape Town	Cape Town CBD	0	0	—	M62 Buitengracht Street, Walter Sisulu Avenue	At-grade intersection
Cape Town	Cape Town CBD	0	0	—	CTICC P1 Parking	No westbound entrance
Cape Town	Cape Town CBD	0	0	—	N1 F W de Klerk Boulevard, Paarl, Bellville, Milnerton	Eastbound exit only; Eastern end of concurrency with N1
Cape Town	Cape Town CBD	0	0	1B	M60 Christiaan Barnard Street, Cape Town CBD	Westbound exit, eastbound entrance
Cape Town	Cape Town CBD	0	0	1A	R102 Strand Street, Cape Town CBD	Westbound exit, eastbound entrance
Cape Town	Zonnebloem	0	0	2	Searle Street	
Cape Town	Woodstock	0	0	3	Melbourne Road, Walmer Estate	
Cape Town	Woodstock	0	0	4	Roodebloem Road, University Estate	
Cape Town	Observatory	0	0	5	Browning Road, Groote Schuur Hospital	Eastbound exit only
Cape Town	Observatory	0	0	5	M3 Philip Kgosana Drive west, Cape Town CBD, Table Mountain	Westbound exit and entrance; Western end of concurrency with M3
Cape Town	Observatory	0	0	6	M3 Rhodes Drive south, Muizenberg, Kirstenbosch	Eastern end of concurrency with M3
Cape Town	Observatory	0	0	7	M4 Main Road, Observatory	Westbound exit, eastbound entrance
Cape Town	Mowbray	0	0	8	M57 Liesbeek Parkway, Mowbray	
Cape Town	Mowbray	0	0	9A	M5 Black River Parkway north, Maitland	Signed as exit 9 westbound
Cape Town	Mowbray	0	0	9B	M5 Kromboom Parkway south, Muizenberg	Eastbound exit only
Cape Town	Mowbray	0	0	10A	M52 Raapenberg Road west, Mowbray	Westbound exit only
Cape Town	Mowbray	0	0	10B	M52 Raapenberg Road east, Pinelands	Signed as exit 10 eastbound
Cape Town	Athlone	0	0	11A	M17 Jan Smuts Drive north, Pinelands	Signed as exit 11B westbound
Cape Town	Athlone	0	0	11B	M17 Jan Smuts Drive south, Athlone	Signed as exit 11A eastbound
Cape Town	Langa	0	0	12	Bhunga Avenue, Langa	
Cape Town	Bonteheuwel	0	0	14	M7 Jakes Gerwel Drive, Bonteheuwel	
Cape Town	Heideveld	0	0	15	M10 Duinefontein Road, Robert Sobukwe Road, Heideveld	
Cape Town	Matroosfontein	0	0	16	Airport Approach Road, Cape Town International	
Cape Town	Nyanga	0	0	18	M22 Borcherds Quarry Road, Nyanga	
Cape Town	Delft	0	0	22A	R300 Kuils River Road north, Bellville	Signed as exit 22 westbound
Cape Town	Delft	0	0	22B	R300 Kuils River Road south, Mitchells Plain	Signed as exit 22 westbound
Cape Town	Khayelitsha	0	0	25	M44 Mew Way, Khayelitsha	
Cape Town	Mfuleni	0	0	29	M32 Spine Road Extension, Blue Downs, Khayelitsha	
Cape Town	Macassar	0	0	33	R310 Baden Powell Drive, Stellenbosch	
Cape Town	Firgrove	0	0	38	M9 Macassar Road, Firgrove, Macassar	
Cape Town	Somerset West	0	0	43	R44 Broadway Boulevard, Stellenbosch, Strand	
Cape Town	Somerset West	0	0	—	R102 Old Main Road	At-grade intersection
Cape Town	Somerset West	0	0	—	M149 Victoria Street	At-grade intersection
Cape Town	Strand	0	0	—	M153 Main Road	
Cape Town	Strand	0	0	—	M161 Broadlands Road	At-grade intersection
Cape Town	Sir Lowry's Pass	0	0	—	M165, M9 Sir Lowry's Pass Road	At-grade intersection
Theewaterskloof	Grabouw	0	0	—	R321 Oudebrug Road east, Grabouw, Villiersdorp	At-grade intersection
Theewaterskloof	Grabouw	0	0	—	R321 Oudebrug Road west, Grabouw, Villiersdorp	At-grade intersection
Theewaterskloof	Botrivier	0	0	90	R43 south, Kleinmond, Hermanus	
Theewaterskloof	Botrivier	0	0	92	R43 Hoof Way, Botrivier, Hermanus	Western end of concurrency with R43
Theewaterskloof	Botrivier	0	0	—	R43 north, Villiersdorp	At-grade intersection; eastern end of concurrency with R43
Theewaterskloof	Caledon	0	0	—	R406 east, Genadendal, Greyton	At-grade intersection
Theewaterskloof	Caledon	0	0	—	R316 Hoop Street, Caledon, Bredasdorp	At-grade intersection
Theewaterskloof	Riviersonderend	0	0	—	R326, Rietpoel, Stanford	At-grade intersection
Theewaterskloof	Riviersonderend	0	0	—	R406 west, Lindeshof, Greyton, Genaendal	At-grade intersection
Swellendam	Stormsvlei	0	0	—	R317 south, Bredasdorp	At-grade intersection; Western end of concurrency with R317
Swellendam	Stormsvlei	0	0	—	R317 north, Stormsvlei, Bonnievale	At-grade intersection; Eastern end of concurrency with R317
Swellendam	Swellendam	0	0	—	R319, Bredasdorp	At-grade intersection
Swellendam	Swellendam	0	0	—	R60, Swellendam, Robertson	At-grade intersection
Swellendam	Buffeljagsrivier	0	0	—	R324 north, Suurbraak, Barrydale	At-grade intersection; Western end of concurrency with R324
Swellendam	Buffeljagsrivier	0	0	—	R324 south, Witsand	At-grade intersection; Eastern end of concurrency with R324
Hessequa	Heidelberg	0	0	—	R322 south, Witsand, Port Beaufort	At-grade intersection; Western end of concurrency with R322
Hessequa	Heidelberg	0	0	—	R322 Van Riebeeck Street north, Barrydale	At-grade intersection; Eastern end of concurrency with R322
Hessequa	Riversdale	0	0	—	R323 Heidelberg Road, Riversdale, Ladismith	At-grade intersection
Hessequa	Riversdale	0	0	—	R305, Stilbaai	At-grade intersection
Mossel Bay	Mossel Bay	0	0	—	R327, Herbertsdale, Mossdustria	At-grade intersection
Mossel Bay	Mossel Bay	0	0	387	R102 Louis Fourie Road, Mossel Bay	
Mossel Bay	Mossel Bay	0	0	393	Aalwyn Way, R102 Louis Fourie Road, Mossel Bay, Hartenbos	
Mossel Bay	Hartenbos	0	0	397	R102, Hartenbos, R328, Oudtshoorn	
Mossel Bay	Little Brak River	0	0	401	R102, Little Brak River	
Mossel Bay	Great Brak River	0	0	409	Lang Street, R102, Great Brak River	
George	Glentana	0	0	419	Morrison Road, Main Road, R102, Glentana	
George	Herolds Bay	0	0	425	R404, George Airport, Herolds Bay	
George	Pacaltsdorp	0	0	431	York Street, Pacaltsdorp	
George	Thembalethu	0	0	434	Nelson Mandela Boulevard, Thembalethu, George Industria	
George	George	0	0	437	N9, N12, George, Oudtshoorn	
Knysna	Knysna	0	0	—	R339, Uniondale	At-grade intersection
Bitou	Plettenberg Bay	0	0	—	R340, Wittedrif	At-grade intersection
Bitou	Kurland	0	0	—	R102 east, Nature's Valley	At-grade intersection
Bitou	Nature's Valley	0	0	552	R102, Nature's Valley, Bloukrans Pass	Tolled exit
Bitou	Nature's Valley	0	0	SANRAL Tsitsikamma Toll Plaza; Bloukrans Bridge		
N2 continues into the Eastern Cape

=== Eastern Cape ===
Municipality	Location	km	mi	Exit	Destinations	Notes
Kou-Kamma	Stormsrivier	0	0	—	R102 west, Coldstream	At-grade intersection
Kou-Kamma	Tsitsikamma	0	0	—	R102 east, Witelsbos, Koomansbos	At-grade intersection
Kou-Kamma	Kareedouw	0	0	611	R402, R102, Eerste Rivier, Kareedouw	
Kou-Kamma	Clarkson	0	0	632	R102, Clarkson, Palmietvlei	
Kou-Kamma	Clarkson	0	0	647	R62, R102, Kareedouw	
Kouga	Humansdorp	0	0	665	R330, Hankey, Humansdorp	
Kouga	Jeffreys Bay	0	0	676	St Francis Street, R102, Jeffreys Bay	
Kouga	Jeffreys Bay	0	0	689	R102, Jeffreys Bay, Mondplaas	
Kouga	Thornhill	0	0	702	R331, R102, Thornhill, Hankey	
Kouga	Thornhill	0	0	707	R102, Van Stadens Pass, Crossways	
Nelson Mandela Bay	Van Stadens Pass	0	0	713	R102, Van Stadens Pass, R334, Uitenhage	
Nelson Mandela Bay	Gqeberha	0	0	724	St Albans Road, Blue Horizon Bay, St Albans	
Nelson Mandela Bay	Gqeberha	0	0	730	Seaview Road, M15 Kragga Kamma Road, Greenbushes, Sea View	
Nelson Mandela Bay	Gqeberha	0	0	736	Bay West Boulevard	
Nelson Mandela Bay	Gqeberha	0	0	740	M7 Samantha Way, Bramlin Street, Lorraine	
Nelson Mandela Bay	Gqeberha	0	0	742	R102 Cape Road, M15 Kragga Kamma Road	R102 east eastbound only; R102 west and M15 west westbound only
Nelson Mandela Bay	Gqeberha	0	0	743	M12 Disa Avenue, Chief Dawid Stuurman International	
Nelson Mandela Bay	Gqeberha	0	0	746	M10 Standford Road, Korsten, Bethelsdorp	
Nelson Mandela Bay	Gqeberha	0	0	748	R75 Commercial Road, Uitenhage, Ibhayi	
Nelson Mandela Bay	Gqeberha	0	0	750	M8 Kempston Road, New Brighton	
Nelson Mandela Bay	Gqeberha	0	0	751A	M4 Burman Road north, Deal Party	
Nelson Mandela Bay	Gqeberha	0	0	751B	M4 Settlers Way south, Gqeberha Central	
Nelson Mandela Bay	Gqeberha	0	0	754	M3 John Tallant Road, R102 Grahamstown Road, Swartkops	
Nelson Mandela Bay	Bluewater Bay	0	0	758	M1 Weinronk Way, Bluewater Bay	
Nelson Mandela Bay	Motherwell	0	0	761	R335 St George St, Motherwell, Markman	
Nelson Mandela Bay	Coega	0	0	764	Neptune Road, Coega IDZ, Coega Business Centre, Port of Ngqura	
Nelson Mandela Bay	Coega	0	0	770	R334 Daniel Pienaar Street, Coega IDZ, Uitenhage	
Sundays River Valley	Paterson	0	0	797	N10 north, Paterson, Cookhouse	Eastbound exit, westbound entrance
Sundays River Valley	Paterson	0	0	798	R72, N10, Port Alfred, Paterson	
Sundays River Valley	Paterson	0	0	—	R342 north, Paterson	At-grade intersection; Western end of concurrency with R342
Sundays River Valley	Paterson	0	0	—	R342 south, Alexandria	At-grade intersection; Eastern end of concurrency with R342
Makana	Makhanda	0	0	—	R343, Alexandria, Kenton-on-Sea	At-grade intersection
Makana	Makhanda	0	0	872	R67 George Street, Makhanda Business Centre, Port Alfred	
Makana	Makhanda	0	0	—	R67, Makhanda, Rini, Fort Beaufort	At-grade intersection
Ngqushwa	Peddie	0	0	—	R345, Peddie, Hamburg	At-grade intersection
Buffalo City	Qonce	0	0	—	R63 west, Dimbaza, Alice, Fort Beaufort	At-grade traffic circle; Western end of concurrency with R63
Buffalo City	Qonce	0	0	—	R346 north, Stutterheim, R63 east, Bhisho	At-grade intersection; Eastern end of concurrency with R63; Western end of concurrency with R346
Buffalo City	Qonce	0	0	—	R346 south, Zwelitsha	Eastern end of concurrency with R346
Buffalo City	Qonce	0	0	—	Independence Street, Bhisho	Westbound exit, eastbound entrance
Buffalo City	Qonce	0	0	—	Welkom Street, Bhisho, Zwelitsha, Breidbach	
Buffalo City	Berlin	0	0	—	R102, Zwelitsha, Berlin	At-grade intersection
Buffalo City	Berlin	0	0	1012	Edgar Glass Street, R102, Berlin	
Buffalo City	Mdantsane	0	0	1025	M17, R102, Fort Jackson, Mdantsane	
Buffalo City	Mdantsane	0	0	1034	M3, R102, Mdantsane, Nahoon Dam	
Buffalo City	East London	0	0	1042	M4 Main Road, R102, Amalinda	
Buffalo City	East London	0	0	1047	M1 Western Avenue, Meadow Road, R102, East London	
Buffalo City	East London	0	0	1049	N6, R72 North East Expressway, East London	
Buffalo City	East London	0	0	1051	M8 Bonza Bay Road, Beacon Bay	No eastbound entrance
Buffalo City	East London	0	0	1054	M10 Main Road, R102, Gonubie	
Buffalo City	East London	0	0	1060	R102, Brakfontein	
Great Kei	Komga	0	0	—	R349, Haga Haga, Kei Mouth	At-grade intersection
Great Kei	Komga	0	0	—	R63, Komga	At-grade intersection
Mnquma	Butterworth	0	0	1138	R409 north, Nqamakwe, Tsomo	Western end of concurrency with R409
Mnquma	Butterworth	0	0	—	R409 south, Centane	At-grade intersection; Eastern end of concurrency with R409
Mbhashe	Dutywa	0	0	—	R408, Willowvale, Ngcobo	At-grade intersection
King Sabata Dalindyebo	Mthatha	0	0	1256	R411, Tabase, Mqanduli, Coffee Bay	
King Sabata Dalindyebo	Mthatha	0	0	—	R61 General Sabelo Victor Gqwetha Street, Port St. Johns, Mthatha, Ngcobo	At-grade intersection
Kumkani Mhlontlo	Tsolo	0	0	—	R396, Tsolo, Maclear	At-grade intersection
Umzimvubu	Mount Ayliff	0	0	—	R394, Bizana, Port St. Johns	At-grade intersection
N2 continues into KwaZulu-Natal

=== KwaZulu-Natal ===
==== Current N2 route (Greater Kokstad-UMuziwabantu) ====
Municipality	Location	km	mi	Exit	Destinations	Notes
Greater Kokstad	Kokstad	0	0	—	R56 west, Kokstad, Matatiele	At-grade intersection; Future interchange; Western end of concurrency with R56
UMuziwabantu	Rietvlei	0	0	—	R56 east, Richmond, Pietermaritzburg	Eastern end of concurrency with R56

==== Future N2 route (Current R61 Wild Coast Toll Route, Port Edward-Port Shepstone) ====
Municipality	Location	km	mi	Exit	Destinations	Notes
Ray Nkonyeni	Southbroom	0	0	—	R620 Marine Drive, Ramsgate, Bushy Vales	At-grade intersection
Ray Nkonyeni	Ramsgate	0	0	29	Alford Avenue, Ramsgate, R620, Margate	
Ray Nkonyeni	Margate	0	0	33	Wingate Ave, Uvongo, R620, Margate	
Ray Nkonyeni	Shelly Beach	0	0	39	Izotsha Road, Shelly Beach, Izotsha	Tolled northbound exit and southbound entrance

==== Current N2 route (East of Port Shepstone) ====
Municipality	Location	km	mi	Exit	Destinations	Notes
Ray Nkonyeni	Port Shepstone	0	0	45	R102, Port Shepstone, Margate	
Ray Nkonyeni	Port Shepstone	0	0	SANRAL Oribi Toll Plaza		
Ray Nkonyeni	Umtentweni	0	0	51	Rethman Drive, Port Shepstone North, St Faiths	Tolled southbound exit and northbound entrance
Umzumbe	Hibberdene	0	0	72	R102, Hibberdene, Sipofu	
Umzumbe	Mthwalume	0	0	79	Cowey Road, Mthwalume, Sipofu	
UMdoni	Ifafa Beach	0	0	84	Ifafa Beach Road, Elysium, Ifafa Beach	
UMdoni	Sezela	0	0	93	R102, Sezela, Pennington, Esperanza	
UMdoni	Park Rynie	0	0	104	R612, Umzinto North, R102, Park Rynie	
UMdoni	Scottburgh	0	0	110	Dududu Road, Dududu, R102, Scottburgh	
EThekweni	Umkomaas	0	0	117	Maclean Street, Craigieburn, Umkomaas	
EThekweni	Ilfracombe	0	0	121	M51 Oak Street, Magabeni, R102, Ilfracombe	
EThekweni	Umgababa	0	0	128	R102, Umgababa, Mnini	
EThekweni	Kingsburgh	0	0	133	R603, Umbumbulu, R102 Kingsway Road, Kingsburgh	
EThekweni	Kingsburgh	0	0	137	Seadoone Road, R102 Main Road, Kingsburgh	
EThekweni	Amanzimtoti	0	0	—	R102 Andrew Zondo Road (Kingsway Road), Amanzimtoti	Southbound exit and entrance
EThekweni	Amanzimtoti	0	0	138	R102 Andrew Zondo Road, Lewis Drive, Amanzimtoti	
EThekweni	Amanzimtoti	0	0	141	M37 Moss Kolnik Drive, R102 Andrew Zondo Road, Amanzimtoti, KwaMakhutha	
EThekweni	Athlone Park	0	0	144	Dickens Road, R102 Andrew Zondo Road, Athlone Park, Umbogintwini	
EThekweni	Prospecton	0	0	146	Joyner Road, R102 Prospecton Road, Prospecton	
EThekweni	Isipingo	0	0	149	R102 Prospecton Road, M35 Willcox Road, Isipingo	
EThekweni	Umlazi	0	0	151	M4 Southern Freeway, Durban Central, Service Road	Former southbound exit to Durban International Airport
EThekweni	Umlazi	0	0	152	R102 South Coast Road, Umlazi, M4 Southern Freeway	Southbound exit only
EThekweni	Woodlands	0	0	154	M1 Higginson Highway, Chatsworth	
EThekweni	Bellaire	0	0	161	M7 Solomon Mahlangu Drive, Queensburgh	
EThekweni	Westville	0	0	165	N3, Pietermaritzburg, Durban Central	EB Cloete Interchange
EThekweni	Newlands West	0	0	170	M19 Umgeni Road, Westville, M21 Inanda Road, Newlands West	
EThekweni	Newlands East	0	0	174	M45 Queen Nandi Drive, Newlands East	
EThekweni	KwaMashu	0	0	177	R102 Chris Hani Road, M25 Curnick Ndlovu Highway, Inanda	Diverging diamond interchange
EThekweni	Mount Edgecombe	0	0	182	M41 UMhlanga Highway, UMhlanga, Mount Edgecombe, M47 UMhlanga Ridge Boulevard, Cornubia	Mount Edgecombe Interchange
EThekweni	Sibaya	0	0	188	Sibaya Drive, M4 Leo Boyd Highway, EMdloti	
EThekweni	EMdloti	0	0	190	M27 Jabu Ngcobo Drive, EMdloti, Verulam	
EThekweni	La Mercy	0	0	195	M65 Dube Boulevard, Dube Tradeport, King Shaka International	Tolled southbound entrance
EThekweni	La Mercy	0	0	SANRAL oThongathi Toll Plaza		
EThekweni	La Mercy	0	0	202	M43 Ushukela Drive, oThongathi	Tolled exit and entrance
KwaDukuza	Ballito	0	0	210	R627 Ballito Drive, M4 Leo Boyd Highway, Ballito, Compensation Beach	
KwaDukuza	Ballito	0	0	212	Shaka's Rock Road, Shaka's Rock	
KwaDukuza	Ballito	0	0	214	Salt Rock Road, Salt Rock, Umhlali	
KwaDukuza	Shakaskraal	0	0	222	Tinley Manor Road, Tinley Manor Beach, Shakaskraal	
KwaDukuza	Groutville	0	0	SANRAL Mvoti Toll Plaza		
KwaDukuza	Groutville	0	0	226	Maqina Road, Groutville	
KwaDukuza	KwaDukuza	0	0	233	R74 Umvoti Drive, KwaDukuza, Blythedale Beach	
KwaDukuza	Darnall	0	0	245	Nkwazi Drive, Darnall, Zinkwazi Beach	
Mandeni	Mandeni	0	0	258	Mandeni Road, Mandeni, Tugela Mouth	Tolled northbound exit and southbound entrance
Mandeni	EMacambini	0	0	269	Macambini Main Road, Macambini, Nyoni	
Mandeni	EMacambini	0	0	277	R66 King Dinizulu Highway, Dokodweni, Gingindlovu	Tolled northbound exit and southbound entrance
UMlalazi	Mtunzini	0	0	283	Fairbreeze	
UMlalazi	Mtunzini	0	0	290	Fairbreeze Mine	
UMlalazi	Mtunzini	0	0	SANRAL Mtunzini Toll Plaza		
UMlalazi	Mtunzini	0	0	297	Hely Hutchinson Road, Mtunzini, R102 North Coast Road, Gingindlovu	Tolled exit and entrance
UMhlathuze	ESikhawini	0	0	315	Mthombothi Street, ESikhaleni, Zululand University	
UMhlathuze	Empangeni	0	0	327	R34 John Ross Highway, Empangeni, Richards Bay	
UMhlathuze	Empangeni	0	0	—	R102 Grantham Highway, Empangeni	At-grade intersection
UMhlathuze	Richards Bay	0	0	342	R619 North Central Arterial, Richards Bay, Nseleni	
UMfolozi	KwaMbonambi	0	0	355	Waterton Road, KwaMbonambi, Amangwe Village	
UMfolozi	KwaMbonambi	0	0	365	Eteza Road, Eteza Traffic Control Centre	
UMfolozi	KwaMbonambi	0	0	—	Enhlabosini, Mfolozi	
Mtubatuba	Mtubatuba	0	0	371	Umfolozi Street, Mtubatuba, KwaMsane	
Mtubatuba	Mtubatuba	0	0	375	R68 Riverview Road, Mtubatuba, St Lucia	
Big 5 Hlabisa	Hluhluwe	0	0	—	Bushlands	
Big 5 Hlabisa	Hluhluwe	0	0	—	R22 Main Road, Hluhluwe, Sodwana Bay	
Big 5 Hlabisa	Hluhluwe	0	0	—	Phinda	
UPhongolo	Pongola	0	0	—	R69, Nongoma	At-grade intersection
UPhongolo	Pongola	0	0	—	R66, Nongoma, Ulundi	At-grade intersection
N2 continues into Mpumalanga

=== Mpumalanga ===
Municipality	Location	km	mi	Exit	Destinations	Notes
Mkhondo	Piet Retief	0	0	—	R33 south, Paulpietersburg	At-grade intersection; Southern end of concurrency with R33
Mkhondo	Piet Retief	0	0	—	R543 Brand Street east, Mahamba (Eswatini)	At-grade intersection; Southern end of concurrency with R543
Mkhondo	Piet Retief	0	0	—	R543 Kruger Street west, Dirkiesdorp	At-grade intersection; Northern end of concurrency with R543
Mkhondo	Piet Retief	0	0	—	R33 north, Amsterdam	At-grade intersection; Northern end of concurrency with R33
Mkhondo	Iswepe	0	0	59	Driefontein, Amsterdam	
Msukaligwa	Ermelo	0	0	—	N11 De Emigratie Street, Amersfoort	At-grade intersection
N2 ends

== Toll Plazas ==
Toll plazas on the N2 include:

=== Tsitsikamma Toll Route ===
- Tsitsikamma Toll Plaza, near Nature's Valley (includes ramp toll plazas)

=== South Coast Toll Route ===
- Oribi Toll Plaza, Port Shepstone (includes ramp toll plazas)
- Izotsha Ramp Toll Plaza, Shelly Beach
- Umtentweni Ramp Toll Plaza, Port Shepstone

=== North Coast Toll Route ===
- King Shaka Ramp Toll Plaza, near King Shaka International Airport
- oThongathi Toll Plaza, near oThongathi (includes ramp toll plazas)
- Mvoti Toll Plaza, near KwaDukuza
- Mandini Ramp Toll Plaza, near Mandini
- Dokodweni Ramp Toll Plaza, Dokodweni (near Gingindlovu)
- Mtunzini Toll Plaza, Mtunzini (includes ramp toll plazas)

== Disruption to route ==
Heavy rains in 2006 triggered a mud-slide on the Kaaiman's pass section of the N2 between George and Wilderness. This caused the road to be temporarily closed from 26 August. As a result of the slide, a section of roadway sagged and large cracks appeared on the road surface. After an inspection by a team of engineers a single lane was reopened on 29 August for vehicles with a gross mass of under 5,000 kilograms (11,000 lb).

An alternative route following the Saasveld road was put into use, but this road only allows for a single lane of traffic and light vehicles. Heavy vehicles have to take an alternative route via the R62 and Langkloof pass effectively lengthening the distance from George to Wilderness from 11 to over 60 km (6.8 to 38 mi). The road has since reopened.

Traffic on the N2 has also been disrupted on numerous occasions because of protests. On 10 September 2007, residents of Joe Slovo Informal Settlement blockaded the N2 Freeway in Cape Town near Langa. Police responded with rubber bullets, injuring over 30 residents. On 4 December 2008, a few thousand residents of eMachambini, between KwaDukuza and Richards Bay in KwaZulu-Natal, blockaded the N2 Freeway in protest against the proposed AmaZulu World Themepark. Police opened fire and injured about 23 residents and arrested about 10.

On 20 October 2012, a section of the N2 was closed after heavy rainfall caused a collapse about 20 km (12 mi) outside Grahamstown.

On 5 November 2024 around 11h00, a section of the N2 was indefinitely closed due to a section of bridge partially collapsing on the southbound carriageway crossing the Embokodweni river next to the Amanzimtoti country club. One of the concrete bearings supporting the roadway failed, causing the surface of the southbound lanes to become uneven.

The road closure has caused severe traffic disruptions into Amanzimtoti, Prospecton, Isipingo and the surrounding areas. Motorists travelling on the N2 southbound were being diverted onto the R102 and M35. It is also suspected that previous damage from the 2022 KwaZulu-Natal floods went undetected according to local officials.

== Safety ==
=== Cape Town ===
The section of the N2 freeway (and its surrounds) that runs past Cape Town International Airport is notoriously dangerous. Over the years, there have been many incidents of objects being thrown at vehicles from the side of the road, robberies, and hijackings. Other illegal disruptions have included offramps being blockaded, spikes being placed on the road, and criminals posing as fellow road users to make up stories and distract innocent motorists.

The goal by criminals is usually to force vehicles to pull over to the side of the road, so that occupants can be robbed, and/or their vehicles can be stolen. Locals know to avoid the stretch of the N2 whenever possible, and use alternative routes. Tourists are advised to do the same.

In December 2025, the City of Cape Town (metro government) announced plans to combat safety issues on the N2. Cape Town Mayor Geordin Hill-Lewis stated that the City would construct a new high-security wall between the highway and the surrounding areas, thereby making it much harder for criminals to attack road users before quickly disappearing into the surrounding townships.

For years, the City maintained the N2 highway, which falls under the domain of the South African National Roads Agency (SANRAL) and the provincial government. SANRAL is formally responsible for maintaining national roads' footbridges, fences, and road mediums. However, more recently, it has stated that because of the violence, it has decided to intervene, regardless of whose mandate fixing the issue is.

Mayor Hill-Lewis said that the existing security fence along the N2 was completely dilapidated, and that it wasn’t fair to the thousands of residents who use the N2 to have to deal with criminal elements on their commute. The Mayor further stated that he cares deeply about commuter safety, but also that the embankment along the N2 would be repaired as part of the project, to make it more dignified for the communities living along the highway.

The project, which has a budget of R180 million, was reaffirmed by the City in January 2026. Aside from a security barrier, the project will facilitate new pedestrian crossings, new lighting, embankment landscaping to help prevent fires and floods, and access control measures.

The broader project will also include safety barriers for designated recreational areas in nearby communities, promoting safer grazing and urban agriculture practices, minimizing illegal dumping, and exploring other opportunities that will emerge from upcoming engagements with communities along the N2.

== N2 Wild Coast Toll Route (N2WCTR) ==
There are plans to realign the N2 national route from Port Shepstone to Mthatha, on a shorter stretch of road, and designate the section of the realigned route from Port Edward to Mthatha as a toll road. The project was started in September 2016. It was initially scheduled for completion in 2024 and this new N2 route will take over the entire section of the current R61 route from Port Shepstone to Mthatha, with realignment between Port Edward and Lusikisiki (providing a shorter stretch of road between the two towns).

This new routing of the N2 between Port Shepstone and Mthatha (through Port Edward and Lusikisiki) together with the existing N2 from Mthatha to the Gonubie Interchange in East London will be known as the Wild Coast Toll Route (N2WCTR), with the tolled section being from Port Edward to Mthatha. There will be two new "greenfields" sections, one between Ndwalane (near Port St. Johns) and Lusikisiki, and the other between Lusikisiki and Port Edward. The latter greenfields section will provide a shorter and more direct route between Port Edward and Lusikisiki (via the Mtentu Bridge and Msikaba Bridge) while the current R61 passes through Flagstaff and Bizana on the route between the two towns.

The greenfields sections will include two new toll plazas, namely the Mthentu Toll Plaza between Lusikisiki and Port Edward, and the Ndwalane Toll Plaza just outside of Port St. Johns. There were also initially plans to place two toll plazas on the stretch from East London to Mthatha: the Ngobozi Toll Plaza just north of the Great Kei Bridge and the Candu Toll Plaza just north-east of Idutywa. Plans to toll this section between East London and Mthatha were cancelled.

In this project, there are plans to widen the N2 from Port St. Johns to East London to a four-lane undivided highway. The new greenfields section between Lusikisiki and Port Edward will also include a four-lane undivided highway, with a four-lane dual carriageway through Lusikisiki. Bypasses around the towns of Butterworth (Gcuwa), Idutywa and Mthatha are to be constructed after the completion of the new toll road. According to Traveller24, this new route will be around 85 km (53 mi) shorter than the current N2 (and 69 km shorter than the current R61) and will be a faster route by about 3 hours for heavy vehicles (1½ hours for light vehicles).

Once this new 'Wild Coast Highway' is complete, the distance between Durban and East London will be reduced to 573 km (356 mi) and the overall route between Durban and Cape Town will be reduced to 1,621 km (1,007 mi), making the newer N2 the shorter route between Durban and Cape Town. The old N2 route passing through Harding, Kokstad and KwaBhaca would then be designated as the R102.

The new greenfields sections in the Eastern Cape were categorized into seven packages. Package 1 is from Ndwalane to Ntafufu, Package 2 is from Ntafufu to the Bambisana turn-off, Package 3 is from the Bambisana turn-off to Lingeni, Package 4 is from Lingeni to the Msikaba Bridge, Package 5 is from the Msikaba Bridge to the Mtentu Bridge, Package 6 is from the Mtentu Bridge to Kulumbe and Package 7 is from Kulumbe to the C. H. Mitchell Bridge.

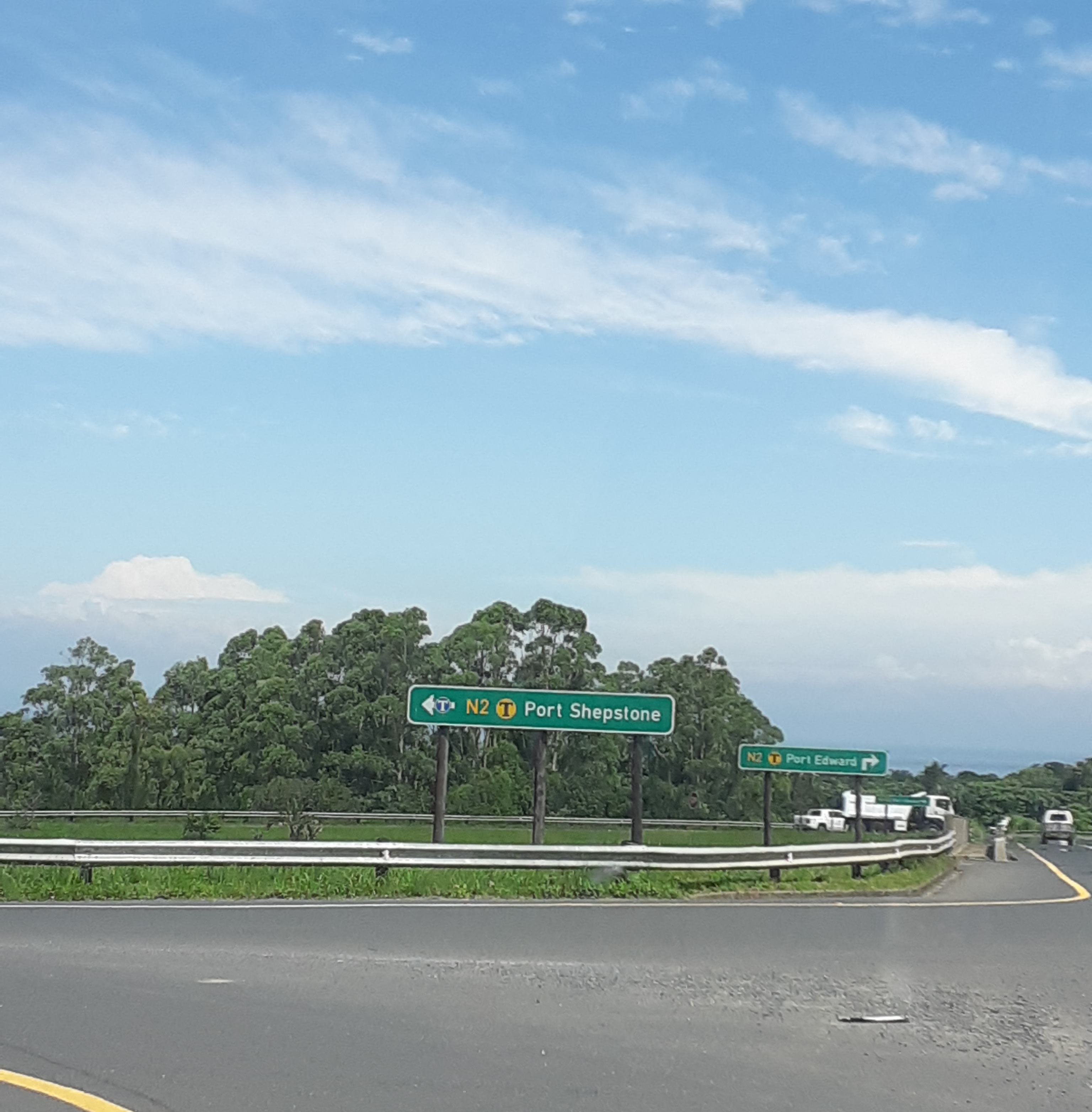
Board signs indicating the N2 to Port Shepstone and Port Edward

As of 2021, the road signs on the section of the R61 from Port Shepstone to Port Edward have already been changed to signs indicating the N2, indicating that this road from the Oribi Toll Plaza (Marburg Interchange) in Port Shepstone southwards will officially no-longer be designated as the R61.

Also, as of August 2024, parts of the road in the Eastern Cape are under construction, including Package 4 and Package 5. The Msikaba Bridge, after several delays, is expected to be completed in 2029 while the Mtentu Bridge, after several delays, is expected to be completed by the end of 2027.

On 10 March 2026, it was reported that construction of the Msikaba and Mtentu bridges was facing renewed delays, credited to unforeseen circumstances revolving around geotechnical, slope-stability and drainage issues for the Mtentu Bridge and the partial collapse of the steel fabrication sector in South Africa for the Msikaba Bridge.

=== Opposition and criticism ===
South Africa's national road agency, SANRAL, also initially planned to do some work on the existing 100 km (62 mi) section of the N2 highway from Port Shepstone to Durban as part of this project, including installing toll plazas at Park Rynie (midway between Port Shepstone and Durban; just north of the R612 off-ramp) and at Isipingo (in the southern part of Durban; where the Durban Outer Ring Road begins).

SANRAL received opposition from the eThekwini Metropolitan Municipality council as well as several businesses in the area over the proposed Isipingo Toll Plaza due to concerns over expenses for drivers in Durban South and traffic in the same area. Those businesses also didn't want any toll plazas found within KwaZulu-Natal to be used to finance the construction of the new greenfields section of road (between Ndwalane near Port St. Johns and the C. H. Mitchell Bridge), which is in a different province (Eastern Cape).

Several companies in the area, led by Toyota South Africa, took SANRAL to court, and the proposed Isipingo tollgate was cancelled. The decision was made to scrap the plan to build any toll gate on the KwaZulu-Natal section of the Wild Coast Highway, which meant that the plan to construct a toll plaza at Park Rynie was also cancelled.

The Amadiba Crisis Committee (ACC) has also expressed issues with the planned road and the Wild Coast region in which the road is to pass through, stating that it would divide the communal farming and grazing lands. They advised SANRAL to reroute the proposed section between the C. H. Mitchell Bridge and the Mtentu Bridge inland, away from the coastline. They held a protest in October 2024 at the Mtentu Bridge site.

== See also ==
- National Roads in South Africa
- The N2 Gateway Housing Project along the N2 freeway in Cape Town
