= Msikaba Bridge =

Cable-stayed steel deck bridge

- Coordinates: 31°17′45.07″S 29°47′35.74″E
- Carries: National Route 2
- Crosses: Msikaba River
- Locale: Lusikisiki, Eastern Cape, South Africa

Characteristics
- Design: Cable-stayed steel deck

History
- Construction cost: R1.65 billion
- Opened: Expected 2029
- Inaugurated: November 2017

Location
- Interactive map of Msikaba Bridge

The Msikaba Bridge is a cable-stayed steel deck bridge, currently under construction, spanning the Msikaba River, near Lusikisiki in the Eastern Cape of South Africa. The Msikaba Bridge forms part of the N2 Wild Coast road (N2WC) project, which aims to improve the travel time between Durban and East London for heavy freight vehicles.

The making of this epic bridge was shown in the National Geographic show "Building Impossible With Daniel Ashville" in Episode 2 of Season 1.

== Bridge design ==
Designed by the Danish firm Dissing+Weitling, the bridge when complete will have a main span of 580m supported from a pair of 127m-tall pylons. The deck will be 194m above the valley floor, making it the third highest bridge in Africa.

Rendition of Msikaba Bridge Suspension Proposal

== Contract award ==
In 2017 the South African National Roads Agency (SANRAL) awarded the tender for the bridge's construction to the Concor Mota-Engil Joint Venture (CMEJV), which comprises Concor, a South African-based construction company, and Mota-Engil, a Portuguese construction company at a cost of US$118 million.

== Construction ==
It is estimated that 28 000 cubic metres of concrete, 2 700 tons of structural steel and 2 500 tons of cables will be needed during construction. The balance of works contained in the contract which includes construction of 1,5 km of approach roadworks on either side of the bridge. Expressed in quantities, this will include 650,000 m³ of bulk earthworks of which 430,000 m³ is hard rock, a conventional three span bridge and four in-situ concrete culverts crossing some of the tributaries. A temporary gondola lift system will reduce travel time between opposite sides of the bridge during construction.

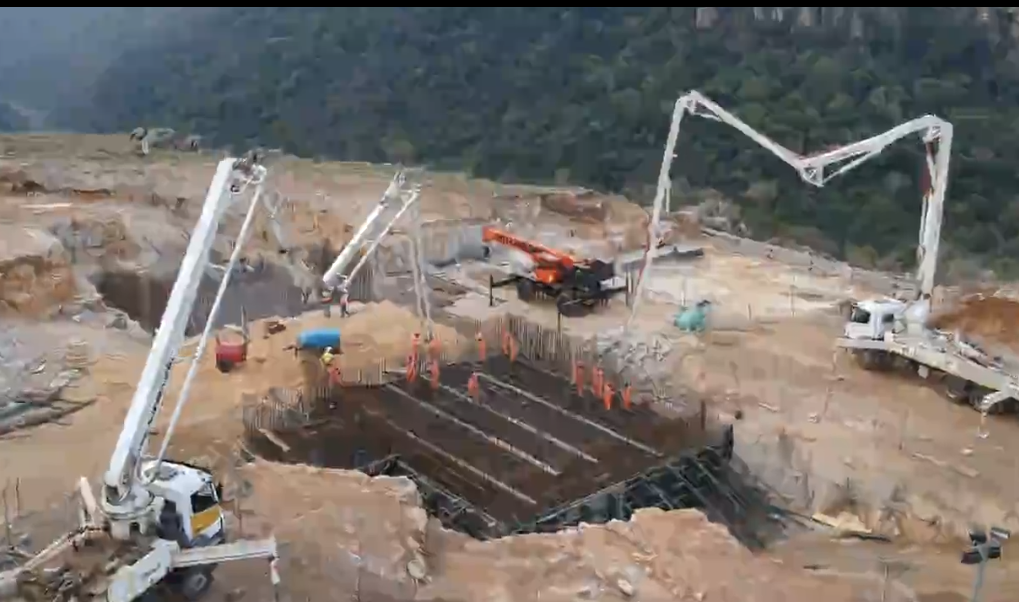
Msikaba Bridge foundation works

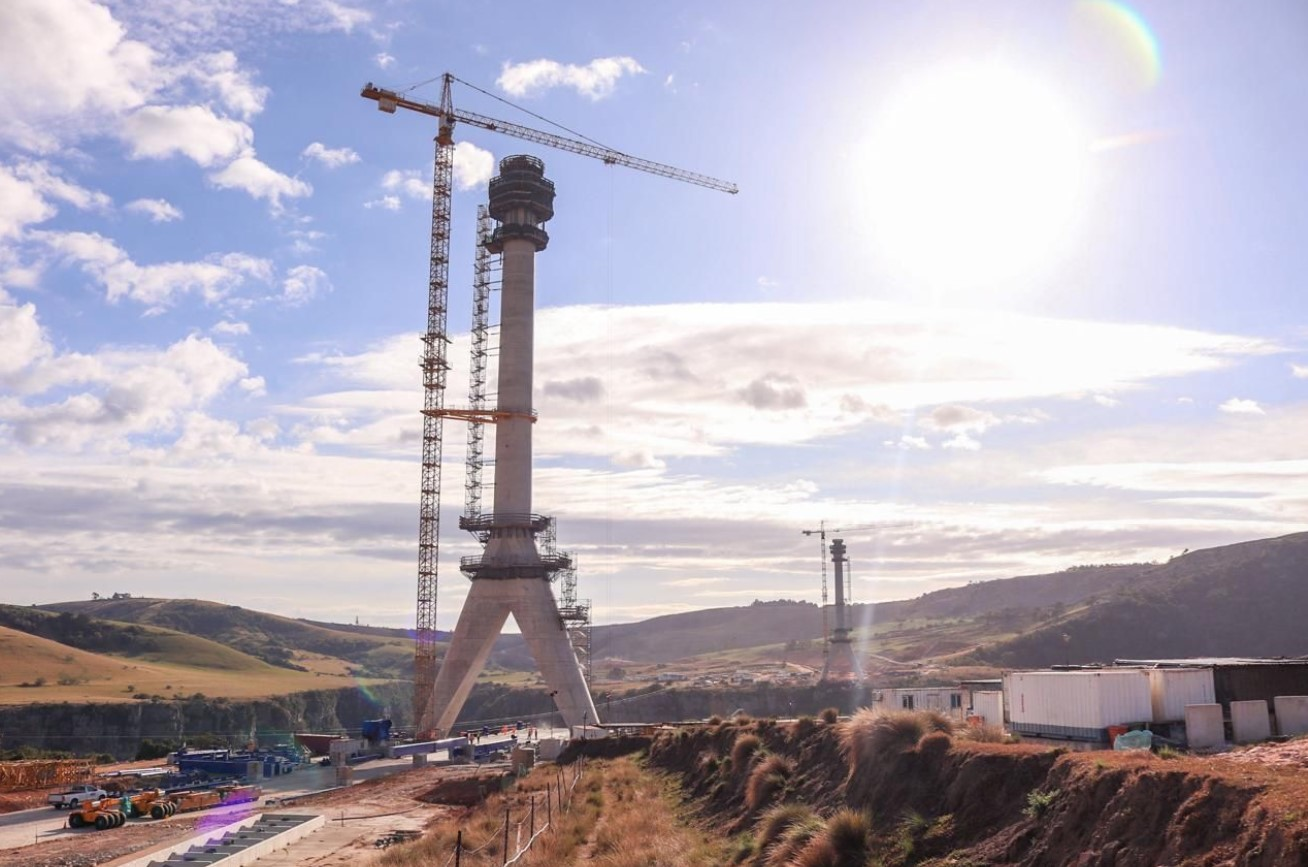
Msikaba Bridge pylons 2024

== See also ==
- List of bridges in South Africa
- List of highest bridges in the world
