= R407 (South Africa) =

Regional route in South Africa

Regional route R407
- R407 route map

Route information
- Length: 91 km (57 mi)

Major junctions
- East end: N12 near Klaarstroom
- West end: N1 at Prince Albert Road

Location
- Country: South Africa
- Towns: Prince Albert

Highway system
- Numbered routes of South Africa
← R406	→ R408

The R407 is a Regional Route in South Africa that connects N1 and N12 via Prince Albert.

== Route ==
The R407 begins at a junction with the N12 national route, 7 kilometres north of Klaarstroom. The R407 heads westward and passes through the town of Prince Albert before continuing north-west for 43 kilometres to reach its end at a junction with the N1 national route at Prince Albert Road.
