= Van Stadens Bridge =

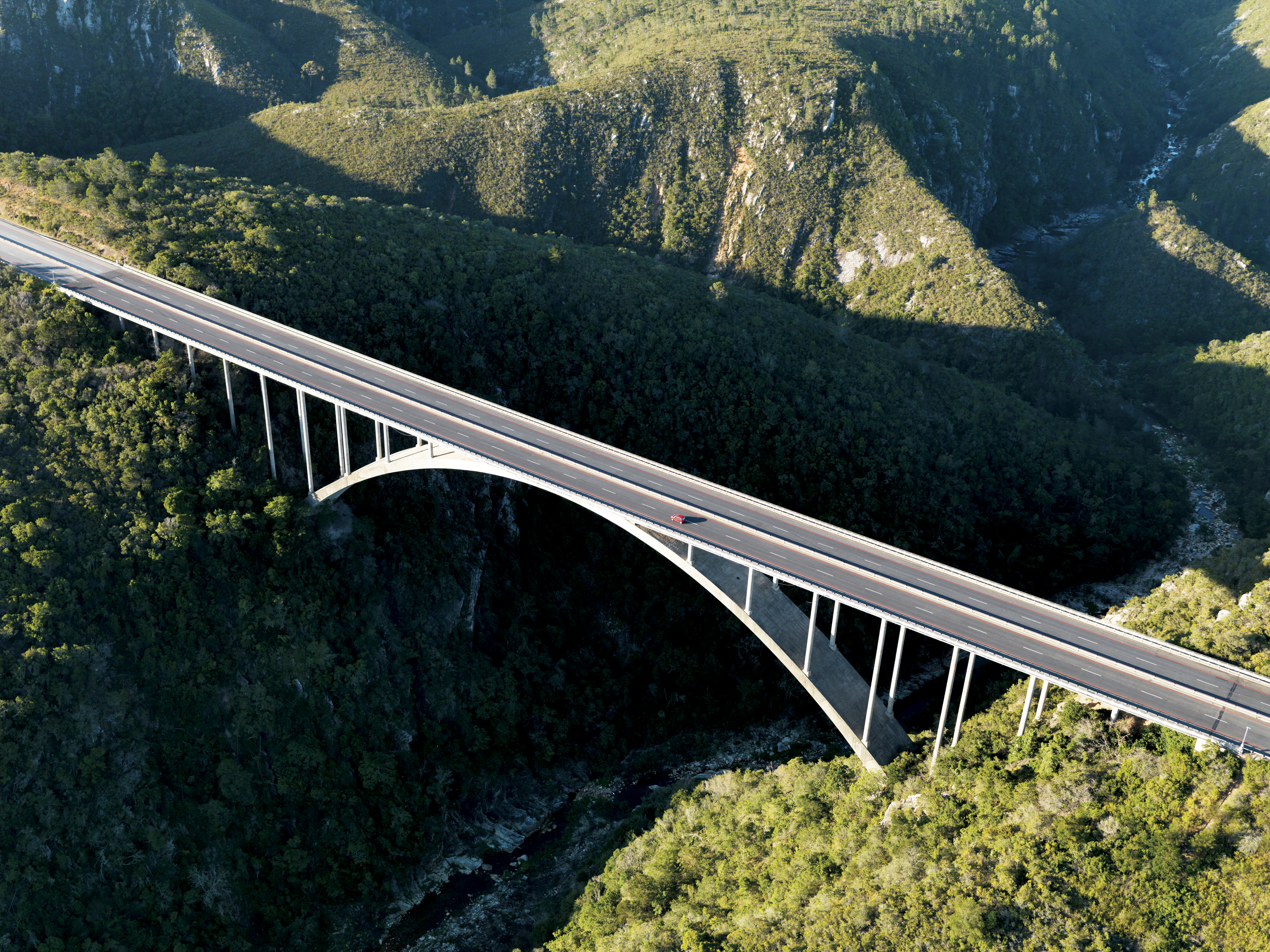
- Coordinates: 33°54′32.64″S 25°11′49.32″E
- Carries: Road traffic
- Crosses: Van Stadens River
- Locale: Eastern Cape

Characteristics
- Design: Arch bridge
- Height: 140 metres (460 ft)
- Longest span: 198.10 metres (649.9 ft)

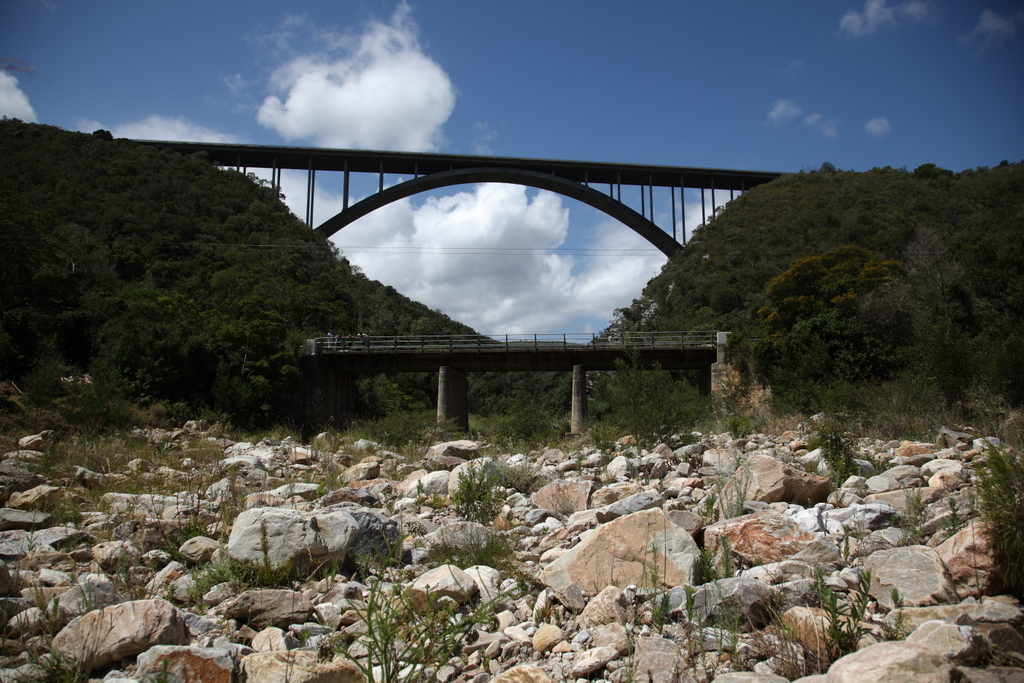
The N2 concrete arch bridge over the Van Stadens River in the background with the old R102 Van Stadens Pass bridge in the foreground. Photo was taken from the original drift over the river.

The Van Stadens Bridge is a concrete arch bridge over the Van Stadens River in the Eastern Cape of South Africa. It carries road traffic for the N2 national highway.

== Suicides at Van Stadens Bridge ==
The Van Stadens Bridge on the N2 was opened on November 11, 1971. Just 12 days later, a Uitenhage man jumped to his death, and its reputation as the Bridge of Death grew from there.

A R1-million video-camera surveillance system, paid for by private donors, was installed in August 2005. Gauteng journalist, Franz Kemp, raised the funds after his daughter Inge had jumped off the bridge in 2003. The local police and pedestrians have rescued some twenty people from jumping off since that time.

One such dramatic rescue took place when a man from Humansdorp wanted to commit suicide from the bridge but was stopped just in time by Freddie van Niekerk, who had just walked past him and said he "felt a sudden chill, as if God was speaking to me" and grabbed the man. Van Niekerk endangered his own life and battled for 45 minutes to stop the man from jumping. Van Niekerk remained with the desperate man, even after the suicidal man had grabbed his benefactor's arms and threatened to pull him off the bridge, too. Van Niekerk had to save that same man a second time that day when he escaped from the Thornhill police station and started jogging back towards the bridge again.

The Thornhill police department, which has a specialist-counselling team on hand for the bereaved relatives of these suicides, retrieved the crushed bodies of an unnamed little girl, an older boy, and a man on whom they found a suicide note. They believe, based on the suicide note, that the three people died shortly after October 31, 2008. Piecing together the events leading to the tragedy, police came to the conclusion that the man must have thrown the two children over the side, sending them plummeting to the rocky floor of the gorge, before jumping himself. The bodies were not found in one place, suggesting that one of the children might have panicked and tried to flee after the first victim went over the side.

Captain Anton Smit said the traumatic discovery was made by two Port Elizabeth teenagers who had gone for a walk during a picnic near the Van Stadens Wild Flower Reserve. Bryan van Vuuren, 17, and his friend Andre Trauernicht, 18, first discovered the body of the boy. The teens alerted Thornhill police station and showed them where they discovered the body. Soon afterwards, the body of the man was found a few metres away. There was also a note indicating that there was another body somewhere among the bushes. The note also mentioned three women who should be notified of the deaths.

A police sniffer dog was called in and the body of the girl was discovered several metres further from where the other two bodies were found. The bodies were not severely decomposed and were identifiable. There was no sign of a vehicle parked near the bridge.

In 2013, a 2,7m high steel mesh pedestrian barrier was constructed to deter suicide jumpers.

== See also ==
- List of arch bridges by length
- Suicide bridge
