= Mtentu Bridge =

Multi span box girder bridge

- Coordinates: 31°10′44″S 29°55′42″E
- Carries: National Route 2
- Crosses: Mtentu River
- Locale: Lundini, Eastern Cape, South Africa

Characteristics
- Design: Box girder bridge
- Total length: 1,132 metres (3,714 ft)
- Height: 223 metres (732 ft)
- Longest span: 260 metres (850 ft)

History
- Construction cost: R4.05 billion
- Opened: Expected 2027
- Inaugurated: November 2017

The Mtentu Bridge is a multi span box girder bridge, currently under construction, spanning the Mtentu River, near Lundini in the Eastern Cape of South Africa.

The Mtentu Bridge forms part of the N2 Wild Coast road (N2WC) project, which aims to improve the travel time between Durban and East London for heavy freight vehicles.

When complete, it would be the highest bridge in Africa at 223 metres and one of the longest main-span balanced cantilever bridge in the world at 260 metres.

== Bridge design ==
The total length of the bridge, when completed, will be 1,133 metres (3,717 ft), with a deck height of approximately 223 metres (732 ft) and a central beam span of 260 metres (853 ft), which would make it one of the highest bridges in the world and one of the longest in Africa.

== Contract award controversies ==
=== Initial contract award ===
In August 2017, the South African National Roads Agency (SANRAL) awarded the tender for the bridge's construction to the Aveng Strabag Joint Venture (ASJV), which comprises Aveng, a South African-based construction company, and Strabag, an Austrian construction company. The tender was valued at R1.634 billion, with construction of the bridge scheduled to take approximately 40 months to complete. The project commenced in November that year, with the bridge component starting in January 2018 however ASJV suspended works in October 2018 due to violent community protests.

In January 2019, SANRAL advised that it had resolved the issues with the local community, petitioners and other stakeholders and the project could resume. ASJV terminated the contract citing force majeure on 6 February. In March the North Gauteng High Court ruled that SANRAL could claim damages against ASJV. ASJV subsequently appealed against the High Court ruling.

In September 2019, SANRAL applied to National Treasury for permission to renegotiate with the previously pre-qualified, but unsuccessful bidders, to complete the bridge contract.

=== Secondary contract award ===
In November 2022, SANRAL awarded a controversial R4.05 billion tender to Mota-Engil Construction South Africa (MECSA) and China Communications Construction Company (CCCC) in a 40/60 joint venture. MECSA Construction has been embroiled in financial difficulties and legal disputes, it being R418 million in debt. It has been described as a "defunct business", having no active projects since 2019, and it hadn't submitted financial statements beyond 2019. CCCC is a Chinese state-owned enterprise that has also been accused of corruption and human rights violations. Previously, the CCCC was debarred by the World Bank Group for nine months for fraudulent practises. They are eligible to participate in World Bank-financed projects as long as they comply with certain obligations. Both companies were found not having sufficient operating cash flow to finance the project.

The Development Bank of Southern Africa (DBSA) worked as the funding overseer for SANRAL for the Mtentu Bridge project. SANRAL affirmed that they approved the CCCC-MECSA contract based on the recommendations made by DBSA. DBSA stated that it did not persist in recommending any bidder, but simply evaluated them based on their technical and financial capabilities, their preference score and their compliance with environmental and social standards.

In August 2023, work restarted and included more upgrades from the initial contract, including an 18 km upgrade of provincial road that would link the N2 to the town of Flagstaff.

== See also ==
- List of bridges in South Africa
- List of highest bridges in the world
