= Van Stadens River =

River in the Eastern Cape, South Africa

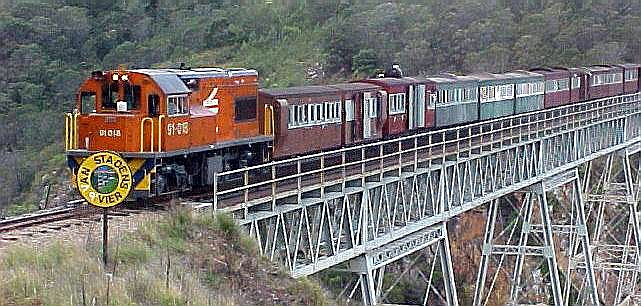
- The Apple Express crossing the Van Stadens River, 6 April 2002

- Location within South Africa

Location
- Country: South Africa
- Province: Eastern Cape

Physical characteristics
- Source: _
- Mouth: Indian Ocean
  - location: Eastern Cape, South Africa
  - coordinates: 33°58′S 25°13′E
  - elevation: 0 m (0 ft)

Van Stadens River is a river in the Eastern Cape province of South Africa. The river mouth is located about 30 km west of Port Elizabeth.

The river was named after Marthinus van Staden, one of the area's pioneering farmers. He was also among the first to plot a rudimentary track through the valley.

The geology of the Van Stadens catchments is primarily derived from rock of the mid-Palaeozoic Era that formed the Table Mountain Group of the Cape Supergroup. The upper to middle catchment areas are characterised by high gradients indicative of steep gorges. Along the river, nutrient concentrations are naturally low. This is a result of the steep topography that prevents human activity like farming which would disturb the natural processes. The Van Stadens Wild Flower Reserve situated upstream and this nature conservancy has kept the level of nutrient input low. The Van Stadens River estuary is 0.52 km2 when the river mouth is closed and the water level is at maximum height.

The Van Stadens Bridge where the N2 national highway crosses the river is known as a suicide location.

Just upstream of the N2 bridge, the 60 cm (2 ft) gauge Avontuur Railway crosses the Van Stadens River over a 78 m (255 ft) high bridge.

== Van Stadens Bridge ==
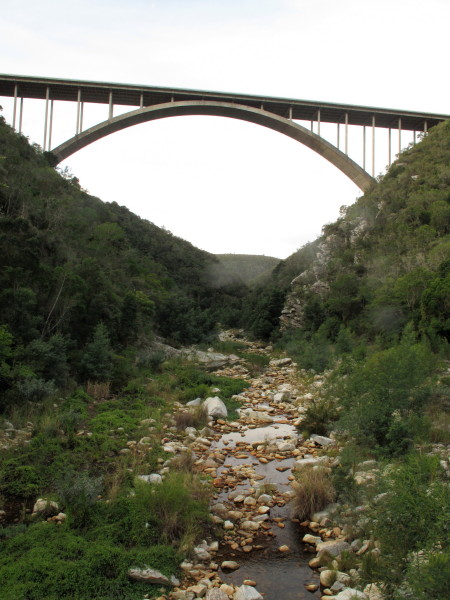
Van Stadens Bridge

The construction of the bridge was completed on 11 November 1971. The deck arch bridge stands at 140 m above the valley floor, contains 1112 m^{3} of concrete and 574 tons of steel.

== Flora and Fauna ==
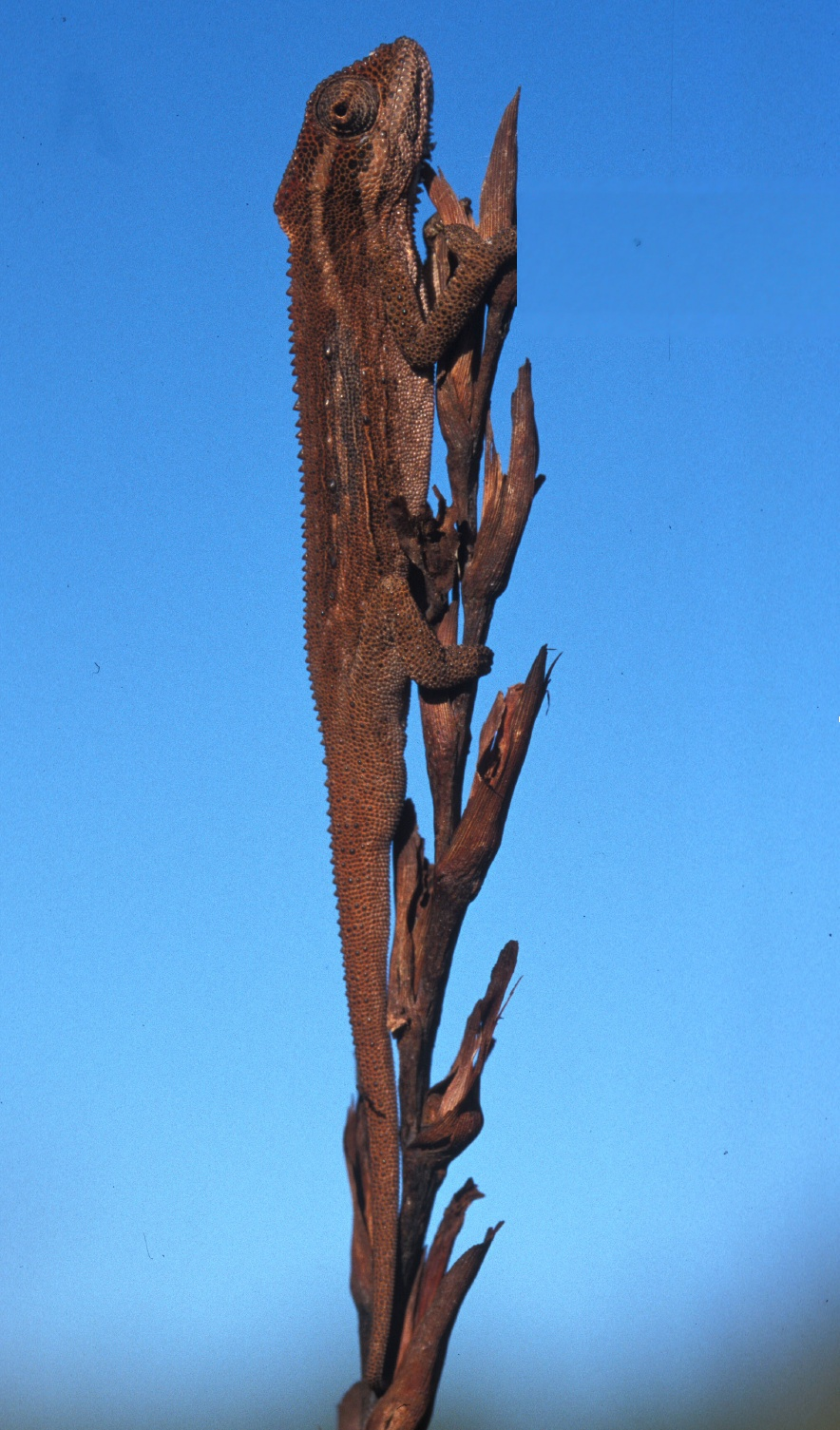
Smith's dwarf chameleon

The river's catchment area is lush, making it ideal for many species of plants throughout the year. With two [biomes] adjacent to each other, fynbos and forest, the area is diverse in unique plant and animal life.

The area's fynbos supports populations of proteas, ericas and orchidaceae. Endemic to the area, aster laevigatus was first discovered in 1902 and then re-discovered after a mountain fire almost a century later. The Van Stadens River gorge is home to the largest population in the world of sterculia alexandri (known as the Cape star chestnut). Adjacent to the N2 national road to Cape Town and 25 km west of Port Elizabeth is the Van Stadens Wild Flower Reserve. The reserve was established in 1951, making it the oldest in the South Africa to provide a sanctuary for indigenous flora and fauna.

Van Stadens River catchment area is also home to the endangered Smith's dwarf chameleon and Hewitt's ghost frog.

== See also ==
- List of longest arch bridge spans
- List of rivers of South Africa
- Van Stadensriviermond
