= R408 (South Africa) =

Regional route in South Africa

Regional route R408

Major junctions
- From: Engcobo
- Dutywa
- To: Qora Mouth

Location
- Country: South Africa

Highway system
- Numbered routes of South Africa
← R407	→ R409

The R408 is a Regional Route in South Africa that connects Engcobo with Qora Mouth via Dutywa.
