= Mtamvuna River =

Mtamvuna River Umtamvuna
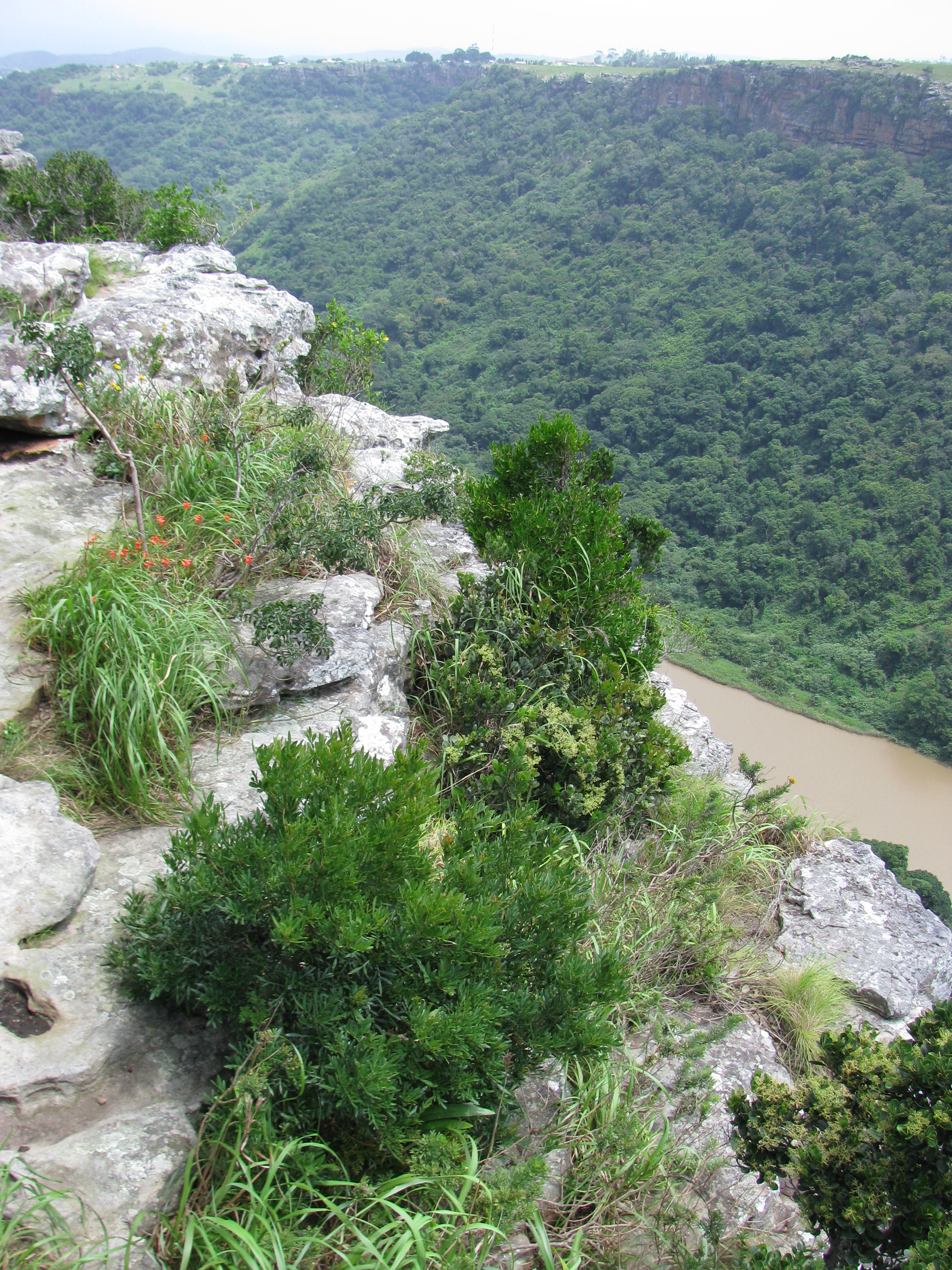
- View of the Mtamvuna River Gorge from Clearwater Trail Centre, near Port Edward

- Location of the Mtamvuna River mouth
- Etymology: Mtamvuna meaning "the reaper of mouthfuls" in the Xhosa language.

Location
- Country: South Africa
- Province: KwaZulu-Natal / Eastern Cape Province

Physical characteristics
- Source
  - location: Near Weza Forest Reserve, KwaZulu-Natal, South Africa
  - elevation: 1,820 m (5,970 ft)
- Mouth: Indian Ocean
  - location: 5km S of Port Edward, KwaZulu-Natal, South Africa
  - coordinates: 31°4′49″S 30°11′42″E
  - elevation: 0 m (0 ft)
- Length: 162 km (101 mi)
- Basin size: 1,553 km^{2} (600 sq mi)

Mtamvuna River is a river that forms the border between KwaZulu-Natal and the Eastern Cape Provinces in South Africa. The river has a wide mouth and flows into the Indian Ocean just south of Port Edward. The Mtamvuna river is approximately 162 km long with a catchment area of 1,553 km². The name means "the reaper of mouthfuls" because of the damage the river does to crops during floods.

== History ==
Historically the Mtamvuna River is the northern limit of the Pondoland region.

In 1552 a Portuguese ship ran aground at the mouth of the Mtamvuna River and a group of local people got close to the sailors wishing to trade with them.

== Ecology ==
The Umtamvuna Nature Reserve is a protected area located close to the deep Mtamvuna River Gorge. Presently this river is part of the Mvoti to Umzimkulu Water Management Area.

== See also ==
- List of rivers in South Africa
- List of estuaries of South Africa
