= Metropolitan routes in East London =

Buffalo City (East London metropolitan area), like most South African cities, uses metropolitan or "M" routes for important intra-city routes, a layer below national (N) roads and regional (R) roads. Each city's M roads are independently numbered.

== Table of M roads ==
No.	Direction	Description of route	Suburbs	Street names
M1	North/South	R72 (City Centre) - M15 - M4 - M5/R102 - N2 - M11 (Dorchester Heights)	CBD, Arcadia, Southernwood, Selbourne, Vincent, Dorchester Heights	Oxford St., Union Ave., Western Ave., Two Rivers Dr.
M3	SSE/NNW	R72 (City Centre) - M15 - M5 - M16 - R102 (Mdantsane)	CBD, Pefferville, Duncan Village, Gompo Town, Buffalo Flats, Haven Hills, Reeston, Mdantsane	Buffalo St., North West Expressway, Phoenix St., Ziphunzana Bypass, Mdantsane Access Rd.
M4	East/West	M13 (Stirling) - M11 - R72 - M1 (cosigned for one block) - M5 - N2 - R102 (Summer Pride)	Stirling, Baysville, Southernwood, Braelynn, Amalinda, Amalinda Forest, Summerpride	Gleneagles Rd., Pearce St., Lukin Rd., Union Ave., Amalinda Dr., Main Road Amalinda
M5	NNE/SSW	Cosigned with R102 (M11 - M1 - R102) - M4 (cosigned for one block) - M3 - leaves town as the Buffalo Pass - R346		Deveraux Ave., Garcia St., Croydon Rd., French St., Windermere Rd., Main Road Amalinda, Woolwash Rd., Buffalo Pass
M7	NE/SW	M11 (Bonnie Doon) - M9 - M8 (Beacon Bay)	Bonnie Doon, Beacon Bay	Batting Rd.
M8	SE/NW	(Cosigned with R102N6 (Nompumelelo) - M10/R102) - N2 - M7 - M9 - Bonza Bay Beach	Nompumelelo, Beacon Bay	Bonza Bay Rd.
M9	First East/West then North/South	M7 - M8	Beacon Bay	Beaconhurst Dr.
M10	East/West	(Cosigned with R102 M8 - R102) - N2 - Gonubie Beach	Gonubie	Main Rd. (Gonubie)
M11	North/South	M4 - R102 (cosigned) - M12 - M7 - under N2 - R102 (end cosigned) - M1 (Dorchester Heights)	Stirling, Nahoon, Bonnie Doon, Abbotsford, Nahoon Valley Park, Dorchester Heights	Old Transkei Rd., Main Rd. (Abbotsford), Smythelands Rd.
M12	East West	M11 - M13 - Nahoon Beach	Nahoon	Beach Rd.
M13	North/South, U-bend, SSW/NNE	R72 (Quigney) - M4 - M12	Quigney, Baysville, Stirling, Nahoon	Currie St., Esplanade Rd., John Bailie Rd., Galway Rd.
M14	North/ South then East/West	R72 (CBD) - R72 (Arcadia)	CBD, Arcadia	Cambridge St., Stephenson/North Sts., Commercial Rd.
M15	East/West	M3 (CBD) - R72	CBD, Southernwood	St. Johns Rd., St. Peters St.
M16	North/South	R102 - M3	Mdantsane	Billie Rd.
M17			Mdantsane	
M18	East/West	R72 (CBD) - R72 (Cove Rock area)	CBD, West Bank, Cove Rock	Dr. Zahn Rd., Bank St., Strand St., Molteno Dr., Prince George Circuit, Parkridge Rd.
M19	North/South	R72 (Sunnyridge) - East London IDZ	Sunnyridge	Chester Rd.
M21	East/West	M3 - M3	Pefferville, Duncan Village, Gompo Town	Douglas Smit Highway
M25	North/South	R72 - Kidd's Beach	Kidd's Beach	Main St. (Kidd's Beach)

== See also ==
- Numbered routes in South Africa
