= Distribution of white South Africans =

White South Africans as a proportion of the total population.: 0–20%; 20–40%; 40–60%; 60–80%; 80–100%

Density of the White South African population.: <1 /km²; 1–3 /km²; 3–10 /km²; 10–30 /km²; 30–100 /km²; 100–300 /km²; 300–1000 /km²; 1000–3000 /km²; >3000 /km²

The distribution of white South Africans is fairly evenly spread. According to the 2022 South African census, they comprise 7.3% of the total population and number 4,504,252. They are found in large numbers in practically every province in South Africa but always as a minority. They are high in concentration in large cities.

Historically, in the pre-1994 provinces, the Transvaal and Orange Free State were predominantly Afrikaans-speaking, Natal was mostly English-speaking and the Cape Province was largely mixed.

== By province ==
Afrikaners are located in all parts of the nation, but in the former homelands such as Transkei and Natal, they are very few. English-speaking whites are generally concentrated in KwaZulu-Natal, Gauteng and in major settlements in the Western and Eastern Cape. Other white groups (such as Portuguese and Germans) live mostly in Johannesburg or Cape Town. In the former homelands, the white populations are so tiny that even the slightest population can affect the percentages speaking Afrikaans or English. Of the largest cities in the country, Johannesburg, Cape Town, Durban, East London and Pietermaritzburg are largely English-speaking in the core, and Pretoria, Bloemfontein, Kimberley, Polokwane, Nelspruit, Witbank and Rustenburg are predominantly Afrikaans-speaking. Port Elizabeth is largely mixed.

Distribution of Afrikaans versus English as home language of white South Africans. 87.5–100% Afrikaans 75–87.5% Afrikaans 62.5–75% Afrikaans 50–62.5% Afrikaans 50–62.5% English 62.5–75% English 75–87.5% English 87.5–100% English

White population of South Africa by province and first language, 2001
Province	Afrikaans	% Afrikaans	English	% English	Other	% Other	Total
Eastern Cape	149,395	48.8%	153,434	50.2%	3,010	1.0%	305,839
Free State	214,020	89.6%	22,225	9.3%	2,544	1.1%	238,789
Gauteng	984,472	56.7%	716,403	41.3%	34,219	2.0%	1,735,094
KwaZulu-Natal	115,721	24.0%	357,200	74.1%	9,193	1.9%	482,114
Limpopo	115,921	87.5%	14,898	11.3%	1,602	1.2%	132,421
Mpumalanga	164,620	83.5%	29,678	15.1%	2,780	1.4%	197,078
North West	237,598	89.0%	26,346	9.9%	2,940	1.1%	266,884
Northern Cape	93,637	91.3%	7,737	7.5%	1,144	1.1%	102,518
Western Cape	461,522	55.4%	359,738	43.2%	11,639	1.4%	832,899
Total	2,536,906	59.1%	1,687,659	39.3%	69,071	1.6%	4,293,636

=== Eastern Cape ===
The Eastern Cape has one of the lowest percentages of whites in South Africa, which is around 4.7%. They number just above 300,000. Similarly to the Limpopo Province, whites as a percent of the population varies around the Eastern Cape. The East, where the former black designated homelands of Transkei and Ciskei are found, have a high density of black people and only a small number of whites. For example, in the OR Tambo District Municipality, located in the former Transkei, only 0.1% of the 1.6 million inhabitants are white. On the other hand, in the west, Local Municipalities such as in the Cacadu District Municipality, contain white percentages exceeding 10%, with the highest being the Kouga Local Municipality, which stands at 25.4%. The largest white population centre is Port Elizabeth, which houses over half (170,000) of the Eastern Cape's white population. Other major white populations exist in East London, Grahamstown, Graaff-Reinet, and a number of smaller towns. The Eastern Cape has the most equal mix of both English- and Afrikaans-speaking whites. The geographic background of the province shows a mix of English and Afrikaans placenames, with no clear distinction between where Afrikaans- or English-speakers live.

=== Free State ===
The Afrikaners far outnumber English-speaking white people in the Free State (formerly called the Orange Free State) because British immigration to the region was very limited. The Afrikaners are predominant in practically all cities and rural areas, with the largest population around Bloemfontein, which holds an estimated 100,000 white people (or a third of the total in the province). The white percentage has recently rebounded after a prolonged decline. In 1880, white people were 45.7% of the total population, which had declined to 36.8% by 1904. Despite a long and steady decline throughout the 20th century, the 2007 Community Survey showed the white population of the Free State had increased from 8.8% to 9.6%. There could be issues with that figure as overall, the population of some municipalities decreased in population by up to 50%, which meant that the "missing" black people counted resulted in an increased white percentage. Major white populations are also found in cities such as Welkom, Kroonstad and Sasolburg.

=== Gauteng ===
Gauteng has a high percentage (10%) and higher number (just under 2 million) of whites than any other provinces. Afrikaner whites tend to be gathered in and around Pretoria (with around 450,000 Afrikaners), the East and West Rand, and in many other cities and towns in Gauteng. English-speaking white South Africans are mostly found in central Gauteng: Johannesburg and the East Rand. Also, the Midvaal Local Municipality, in Gauteng, contains one of the highest percentage of whites in the country, which in 2007 stood at 35%.

=== KwaZulu-Natal ===
KwaZulu-Natal is the only province in which the vast majority of white people are English-speaking. However, some towns remain in the north with large Afrikaner populations such as in the town of Vryheid. Before 1994, the province was called Natal, and in the 1960 republic referendum, it was the only province to vote against severing links to the British Crown. KwaZulu-Natal, like most other provinces, has experienced both a numerical and proportional decline in the white population. Over half of KwaZulu-Natal's white population lives in Durban and its surrounding suburbs.

=== Limpopo ===
The Limpopo Province has a smaller percentage of white people than any other province in the country, which in 2007 stood at 2.2%. Almost entirely Afrikaners, the white population is very unevenly spread. Some municipalities, especially in the more lightly populated west, have white percentages reaching far beyond 10% such as the Thabazimbi (23%), Bela-Bela (13%) and Mookgopong Local Municipality (21%). Conversely, in the much more densely populated east, with the former homelands of Gazankulu, Lebowa and Venda, the white percentage drops significantly because of the high black population density. Some municipalities, including the Thumamela and Mutale Local Municipality, have white populations of no more than 500 and so have percentages reaching as low as 0.05%. The capital city, Polokwane (formerly Pietersburg), holds around 27,000 whites, making up just under a fourth of the province's white population. Other major white concentrations are in Tzaneen, Phalaborwa, Thabazimbi, Louis Trichardt and practically every settlement along the N1 national road.

=== Mpumalanga ===
In 2007 roughly 6.7% of Mpumalanga was white, mostly Afrikaans-speaking. Approximately 250,000 whites live in Mpumalanga, with major population centres being the capital, Nelspruit, and other large cities such as Witbank, Middelburg, Ermelo and Lydenburg.

=== Northwest Province ===
The Northwest Province has a situation that is almost identical to that of Mpumalanga. There is a very strong and patriotic Afrikaner community in the province, which is also the birthplace of the Afrikaner Weerstandsbeweging (AWB), which was created in Ventersdorp. There is an especially strong Afrikaner influence in the city of Potchefstroom. In 2007, there were 235,580 whites, making up roughly 7.2% (up from 6.7% in 2001) of the province's total population. The vast majority are Afrikaans-speaking.

=== Northern Cape ===
The Northern Cape's small white population is also dominated by Afrikaners, with some English-speaking whites in cities such as Kimberley. The white population is no more than 100,000, but because the province is very sparsely populated, the white population has thus remained very much above 10%, even since 1994. Roughly 25% of whites live in the Sol Plaatje Local Municipality, which contains the Diamond-mining city of Kimberley. Although it has only about 12,000 white inhabitants, the Namakwa District Municipality, in the very sparsely populated western Northern Cape, they still manage to make up over 11% of the District Municipality's population. Afrikaans is the lingua franca in the Northern Cape because the majority of the province's population (mostly Coloureds) speak it as a first language. Only the north-eastern areas have more blacks than Coloureds and as well as far fewer white people. Besides Kimberley, other important white concentrations are found in Upington, Britstown, Springbok, De Aar, Jan Kempdorp and Barkly West. Orania, a purpose-built town for Afrikaans-speaking whites, is also in the east of the Northern Cape, bordering the Free State. It houses just over 2,000 inhabitants and is a special case as it is the only "main-place" in which virtually all inhabitants are white.

=== Western Cape ===
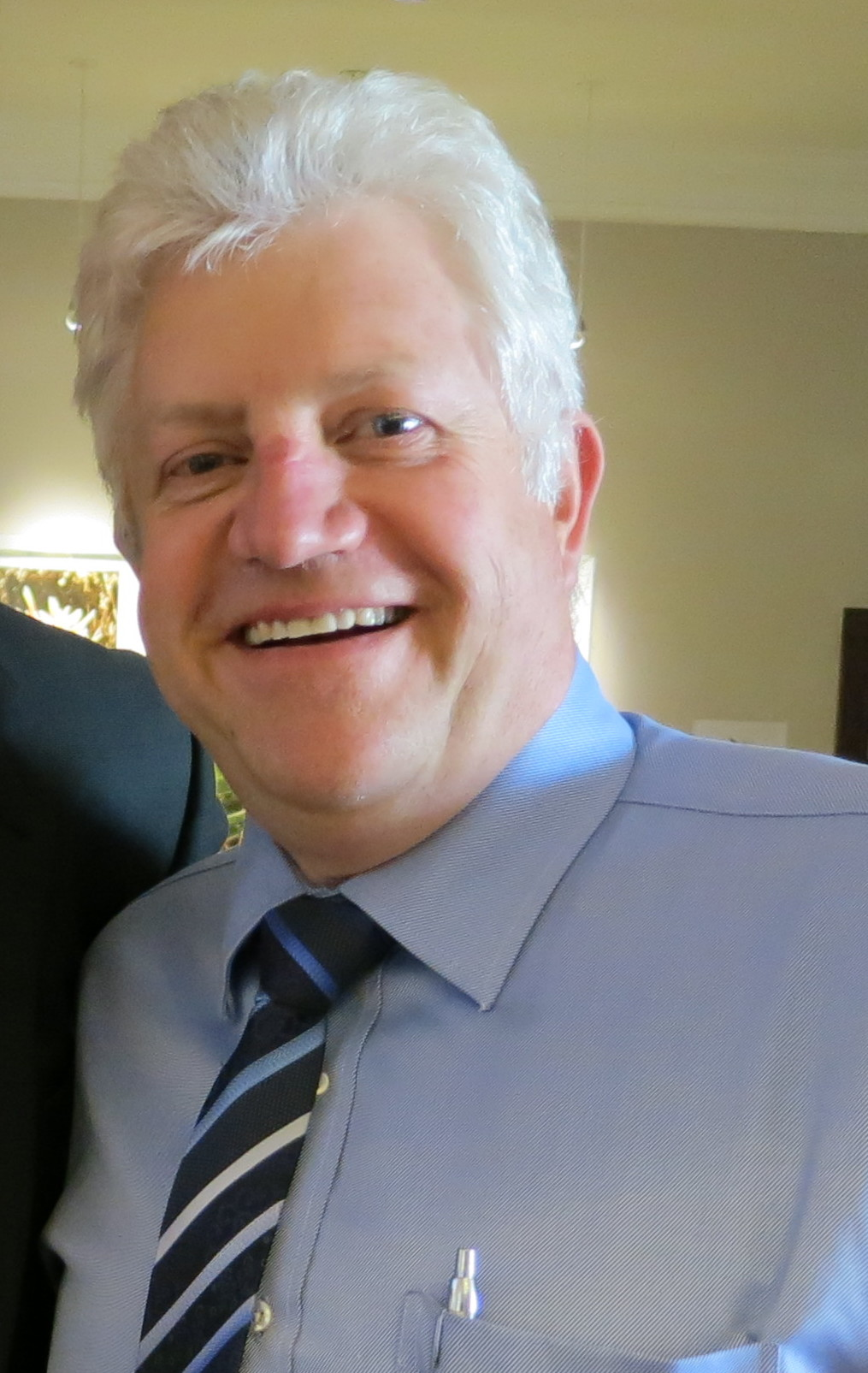
Alan Winde, the Premier of the Western Cape, is an English-speaking white South African.

The Western Cape has the highest percentage of white people (16%) in South Africa, at 850,000 and the only one with a white premier (governor). The lingua franca is Afrikaans, but some urban areas, especially Cape Town, have a large English-speaking population. Many Cape Town suburbs and neighbourhoods have white majorities, including some with a white population of at least 95%, such as Llandudno, Fish Hoek, and Constantia. The Western Cape has some of the highest white percentage municipalities in South Africa, such as the Overstrand (33%), Hessequa (38%), Mossel Bay (28%), Noordhoek (25%), Cape Agulhas (23%), and Knysna (23%).

== Largest population centres ==
This is a list of the "main places" (localities) in South Africa with a white population of more than 10,000, with data taken from the 2011 census.

Place	Province	White population	Percentage %
Pretoria	Gauteng	389,022	52.45%
Randburg	Gauteng	153,882	45.66%
Cape Town	Western Cape	140,125	32.3%
Centurion	Gauteng	139,501	58.97%
Johannesburg	Gauteng	133,379	13.93%
Port Elizabeth	Eastern Cape	118,220	37.84%
Roodepoort	Gauteng	115,541	35.40%
Sandton	Gauteng	110,723	49.78%
Durban	KwaZulu-Natal	91,212	15.33%
Kempton Park	Gauteng	80,388	46.85%
Germiston	Gauteng	80,034	31.28%
Bloemfontein	Free State	76,325	29.79%
Boksburg	Gauteng	73,887	28.38%
Krugersdorp	Gauteng	70,636	50.22%
Alberton	Gauteng	64,675	53.21%
Benoni	Gauteng	60,421	38.05%
Bellville	Western Cape	56,624	50.33%
Vanderbijlpark	Gauteng	52,174	54.44%
Witbank	Mpumalanga	50,810	46.75%
Blouberg	Western Cape	47,450	44.67%
Milnerton	Western Cape	45,660	47.75%
Durbanville	Western Cape	44,607	82.17%
Springs	Gauteng	44,075	36.24%
East London	Eastern Cape	42,722	16.00%
Middelburg	Mpumalanga	42,329	48.46%
Rustenburg	North-West	42,308	40.44%
Brakpan	Gauteng	38,956	53.31%
Brackenfell	Western Cape	35,424	79.00%
Klerksdorp	North-West	33,614	18.02%
Somerset West	Western Cape	33,142	60.08%
Vereeniging	Gauteng	33,018	33.09%
Edenvale	Gauteng	32,570	66.08%
Pietermaritzburg	KwaZulu-Natal	31,827	14.24%
Parow	Western Cape	30,408	25.45%
Potchefstroom	North-West	30,387	69.94%
George	Western Cape	29,242	25.59%
Randfontein	Gauteng	29,074	36.12%
Nelspruit	Mpumalanga	28,923	49.30%
Secunda	Mpumalanga	28,910	71.92%
Meyerton	Gauteng	26,852	48.57%
Pinetown	KwaZulu-Natal	25,876	17.97%
Polokwane	Limpopo	23,730	18.25%
Kraaifontein	Western Cape	22,337	14.45%
Midrand	Gauteng	21,168	24.22%
Sasolburg	Free State	20,282	66.07%
Paarl	Western Cape	20,051	17.90%
Uitenhage	Eastern Cape	19,114	18.44%
Goodwood	Western Cape	19,083	37.95%
Strand	Western Cape	19,004	34.21%
Kimberley	Northern Cape	17,841	18.40%
Despatch	Eastern Cape	17,717	44.72%
Richards Bay	KwaZulu-Natal	17,276	30.10%
Welkom	Free State	17,226	26.86%
Kuils River	Western Cape	15,211	32.58%
Akasia	Gauteng	14,220	23.92%
Worcester	Western Cape	13,626	17.27%
Hartebeespoort	North-West	13,293	59.41%
Heidelberg	Gauteng	13,251	37.26%
Newcastle	KwaZulu-Natal	13,223	23.55%
Umhlanga	KwaZulu-Natal	12,925	53.32%
Westville	KwaZulu-Natal	12,824	42.03%
Nigel	Gauteng	12,799	33.40%
Margate	KwaZulu-Natal	12,563	46.90%
Stellenbosch	Western Cape	12,501	65.56%
Ermelo	Mpumalanga	12,198	14.54%
Brits	North-West	11,928	46.59%
Kingsburgh	KwaZulu-Natal	11,515	70.35%
Hillcrest	KwaZulu-Natal	11,233	84.27%
Queensburgh	KwaZulu-Natal	11,063	20.17%
Gordons Bay	Western Cape	10,999	65.56%
Jeffreys Bay	Eastern Cape	10,544	38.90%
Hout Bay	Western Cape	10,274	57.40%
Muizenberg	Western Cape	10,241	27.79%
Mossel Bay	Western Cape	10,237	34.25%
Standerton	Mpumalanga	10,165	23.12%
Kloof	KwaZulu-Natal	10,050	33.83%
White River	Mpumalanga	10,025	60.25%

== Largest populations by province ==
The following lists show the "main places" with the largest white populations in each province, with data taken from the 2011 census.

=== Eastern Cape ===
The results of the 2011 census showed an Eastern Cape white population of 310,450, a slight increase on the 304,342 recorded in 2007 and the 305,839 recorded in 2001, but a decrease from the 330,300 counted in 1996.

The 50 main places with a population of more than 300 white persons in 2011 are listed below: (Although population figures are shown for both 2001 and 2011, these numbers are not necessarily directly comparable due to numerous changes in administrative boundaries.)

Main Place	2011	2001	Municipality	Predominant languages in each particular main place (excluding languages spoken by less than 1.5% of the total population)
Port Elizabeth	118,220	123,722	Nelson Mandela Bay	Afrikaans 40%; English 33%; Xhosa 22%; foreign languages 2%
East London	42,722	40,180	Buffalo City	Xhosa 62%; English 21%; Afrikaans 13%
Uitenhage	19,114	19,180	Nelson Mandela Bay	Afrikaans 69%; Xhosa 18%; English 10%
Despatch	17,717	14,683	Nelson Mandela Bay	Afrikaans 60%; Xhosa 33%; English 5%
Jeffreys Bay	10,544 (includes Aston Bay and Paradise Beach)	6,564	Kouga	Afrikaans 54%; Xhosa 29%; English 12%
Gonubie	7,864	6,323	Buffalo City	English 57%; Afrikaans 21%; Xhosa 20%
Grahamstown (Makhanda)	5,636	6,232	Makana	Xhosa 67%; Afrikaans 17%; English 13%
Queenstown (Komani)	4,487	4,984	Lukhanji	Xhosa 64%; Afrikaans 21%; English 10%; foreign languages 2%
Cradock	4,331	2,937	Inxuba Yethemba	Xhosa 56%; Afrikaans 38%; English 4%
Port Alfred	4,295	3,468	Ndlambe	English 35%; Xhosa 32%; Afrikaans 30%
Graaff Reinet	3,113	3,511	Camdeboo	Afrikaans 92%; English 4%; Xhosa 3%
Aliwal North	1,989	2,390	Maletswai	Xhosa 50%; Afrikaans 32%; Sotho 13%; English 3%
Humansdorp	1,947	2,409	Kouga	Afrikaans 90%; Xhosa 5%; English 3%
King Williams Town	1,892	2,881	Buffalo City	Xhosa 55%; Afrikaans 27%; English 14%
Clarendon Marine (Seaview)	1,698	1,160 (Seaview and Beachview combined)	Nelson Mandela Bay	Afrikaans 41%; English 36%; Xhosa 19%; Sotho 2%
Burgersdorp	1,503	947	Gariep	Afrikaans 63%; Xhosa 30%; English 3%; Sotho 2%
Somerset East	1,338	1,469	Blue Crane Route	Afrikaans 57%; Xhosa 38%; English 4%
St Francis Bay	1,286	610	Kouga	Xhosa 39%; Afrikaans 33%; English 22%; foreign languages 2%
Middelburg	1,167 (includes KwaNonzame)	2,026	Inxuba Yethemba	Afrikaans 52%; Xhosa 44%; English 2%
Stutterheim	1,101	1,133	Amahlathi	Xhosa 87%; Afrikaans 6%; English 5%
Mthatha (Umtata)	998	1,007	King Sabata Dalindyebo	Xhosa 85%; English 9%
Kirkwood	984	846	Sundays River Valley	Afrikaans 83%; Xhosa 13%; English 2%
Kenton-on-Sea	895	1,291 (includes Bushmans River)	Ndlambe	Xhosa 71%; English 20%; Afrikaans 6%
Colchester	744	299	Nelson Mandela Bay	Afrikaans 49%; Xhosa 33%; English 15%
Fort Beaufort	676	696	Nkonkobe	Xhosa 77%; Afrikaans 15%; English 5%
Sunrise-on-Sea	586	623	Buffalo City	English 74%; Afrikaans 22%; Xhosa 4%
Alexandria	525	775	Ndlambe	Afrikaans 81%; Xhosa 27%; English 9%
Joubertina	518	630	Kou-Kamma	Afrikaans 88%; Xhosa 6%; English 3%
Bushmans River (Boesmansriviermond)	508	512 (included in Kenton-on-Sea)	Ndlambe	Xhosa 74%; Afrikaans 17%; English 7%
Matatiele	506	900	Matatiele	Xhosa 48%; Sotho 24%; English 14%; Afrikaans 8%; Zulu 2%; foreign languages 2%
Bathurst	492	501	Ndlambe	English 59%; Afrikaans 24%; Xhosa 15%
Aberdeen	481	616	Camdeboo	Afrikaans 95%; English 3%
Kareedouw	474	563	Kou-Kamma	Afrikaans 73%; Xhosa 22%; English 2%
Patensie	423	218	Kouga	Afrikaans 70%; Xhosa 25%; foreign languages 2%
Jansenville	419	540	Ikwezi	Afrikaans 87%; Xhosa 7%; English 3%
Adelaide	416	815	Nxuba	Afrikaans 46%; Xhosa 46%; English 5%
Elliot	392	480	Sakhisizwe	Xhosa 87%; Afrikaans 4%; English 4%; Sign Language 2%
Kidd's Beach	376	331	Buffalo City	English 64%; Xhosa 20%; Afrikaans 14%
Kayser's Beach	373	176	Buffalo City	English 45%; Xhosa 41%; Afrikaans 12%
Blue Horizon Bay	371	370	Nelson Mandela Bay	Afrikaans 65%; English 28%; foreign languages 3%
Ugie	347	114	Elundini	Xhosa 89%; Afrikaans 5%; English 2%; Sotho 2%
Queensberry Bay (Cintsa)	343	384	Great Kei	English 71%; Afrikaans 16%; Xhosa 13%
Bethelsdorp	332	192	Nelson Mandela Bay	Afrikaans 58%; Xhosa 29%; English 11%
Cape St. Francis	324	162	Kouga	English 56%; Afrikaans 46%; Xhosa 2%
Christmas Rock	322	n.a.	Buffalo City	English 79%; Afrikaans 20%
Cathcart	320	440	Amahlathi	Xhosa 78%; English 12%; Afrikaans 7%
Hogsback	314	235	Nkonkobe	Xhosa 63%; English 28%; Afrikaans 6%
Molteno	310	433	Inkwanca	Xhosa 89%; Afrikaans 7%; English 2%
Komga	301	372	Great Kei	Xhosa 89%; Afrikaans 5%; English 4%
Sterkstroom	300	350	Inkwanca	Xhosa 85%; Afrikaans 10%; English 2%

=== Free State ===
The results of the 2011 census showed a white population of 239,026 in the Free State, a decrease from the 266,555 recorded in 2007. There were 238,789 in 2001 and 316,459 in 1996.

Just over a third (34.4%) of the white population lived in the Mangaung Metropolitan Municipality around Bloemfontein at the time of the 2011 census. The Matjhabeng and Metsimaholo local municipalities around Welkom and Sasolburg comprise about a sixth (16.6%) and a tenth (10.2%) respectively, while much of the white population resides in numerous small towns.

The 53 main places with a 2011 population of more than 360 white persons are listed below: (Although population figures are shown for both 2001 and 2011, these numbers are not necessarily directly comparable due to numerous changes in administrative boundaries.)

Main Place	2011	2001	Municipality	Predominant languages in each particular main place (excluding languages spoken by less than 1.5% of the total population)
Bloemfontein (Mangaung)	76,515 (Bloemfontein and Mangaung combined)	72,619 (excludes Opkoms)	Mangaung	Sotho 42%; Afrikaans 24%; Tswana 13%; Xhosa 12%; English 5%
Sasolburg	20,282	17,306	Metsimaholo	Afrikaans 64%; Sotho 16%; English 9%; Zulu 3%; Xhosa 2%; Tswana 2%
Welkom	17,226	17,448	Matjhabeng	Afrikaans 38%; Sotho 33%; English 11%; Xhosa 9%; Tswana 2%; Zulu 2%
Kroonstad	9,655	12,858	Moqhaka	Afrikaans 62%; Sotho 25%; English 5%; Xhosa 2%; foreign languages 2%
Bethlehem	9,099	7,833	Dihlabeng	Afrikaans 67%; Sotho 19%; English 7%; Zulu 3%
Parys	6,808	7,387	Ngwathe	Afrikaans 85%; English 7%; Sotho 5%
Virginia	6,499	8,820	Matjhabeng	Sotho 42%; Afrikaans 32%; Xhosa 10%; English 6%; Tsonga 2%; foreign languages 2%; Tswana 2%
Riebeeckstad	5,452	5,526	Matjhabeng	Afrikaans 48%; Sotho 32%; English 9%; Xhosa 4%; Tswana 3%
Odendaalsrus	3,875	5,082	Matjhabeng	Afrikaans 47%; Sotho 32%; Xhosa 8%; English 6%; Tswana 2%
Harrismith	2,988	3,370	Maluti-a-Phofung	Zulu 49%; Sotho 33%; Afrikaans 10%; English 4%
Hennenman	2,820	2,100	Matjhabeng	Afrikaans 82%; Sotho 8%; English 4%; Xhosa 2%
Ficksburg	2,287	2,535	Setsoto	Afrikaans 51%; English 22%; Sotho 18%; foreign languages 5%
Bothaville	2,275	2,371	Nala	Afrikaans 59%; Sotho 30%; Xhosa 4%; English 3%
Frankfort	2,136	1,642	Mafube	Sotho 44%; Afrikaans 37%; Zulu 12%; English 2%
Reitz	1,818	1,370	Nketoana	Afrikaans 55%; Sotho 32%; Zulu 5%; English 3%
Ladybrand	1,740	1,827	Mantsopa	Afrikaans 41%; Sotho 31%; English 20%; foreign languages 4%
Heilbron	1,526	1,443	Ngwathe	Sotho 60%; Afrikaans 29%; Zulu 5%; English 2%
Senekal	1,485	1,313	Setsoto	Sotho 47%; Afrikaans 46%; English 3%; foreign languages 2%
Viljoenskroon	1,420	1,702	Moqhaka	Afrikaans 67%; Sotho 19%; English 6%; foreign languages 3%; Xhosa 2%
Brandfort	1,412	1,231	Masilonyana	Afrikaans 49%; Sotho 33%; Xhosa 7%; Tswana 4%; English 3%
Bultfontein	1,269	857	Tswelopele	Afrikaans 58%; Sotho 24%; Xhosa 6%; Tswana 4%; English 3%; foreign languages 2%
Wesselsbron (Wesselbron)	1,092	981	Nala	Afrikaans 79%; Sotho 11%; English 5%; foreign languages 2%; Xhosa 2%
Deneysville	1,072	847	Metsimaholo	Afrikaans 52%; English 20%; Sotho 17%; Zulu 4%; foreign languages 2%; Xhosa 2%
Allanridge	1,019	1,379	Matjhabeng	Afrikaans 44%; Sotho 31%; Xhosa 8%; English 6%; Tswana 3%; Zulu 2%; Tsonga 2%
Vrede	977	1,181	Phumelela	Afrikaans 52%; Zulu 20%; Sotho 19%; English 4%
Kragbron (Taaibos)	889	1,127	Metsimaholo	Afrikaans 82%; English 7%; Sotho 7%; Zulu 2%
Villiers	869	888	Mafube	Afrikaans 71%; Sotho 11%; English 9%; Zulu 5%; Sign Language 2%
Hoopstad	854	437	Tswelopele	Afrikaans 87%; Sotho 4%; English 3%; foreign languages 3%; Tswana 2%
Boshof	851	689	Tokologo	Afrikaans 57%; Tswana 31%; Sotho 3%; Xhosa 3%; English 2%; Ndebele 2%
Theunissen	840	1,174	Masilonyana	Afrikaans 55%; Sotho 29%; English 5%; Xhosa 4%; foreign languages 4%; Tswana 2%
Winburg	725	887	Masilonyana	Afrikaans 69%; Sotho 16%; English 8%; Xhosa 2%; Tswana 2%
Vredefort	718	628	Ngwathe	Afrikaans 66%; Sotho 22%; English 4%; foreign languages 3%; Xhosa 3%
Ventersburg	840	662	Matjhabeng	Afrikaans 71%; Sotho 16%; English 6%; Xhosa 3%; foreign languages 2%; Tswana 2%
Warden	698	624	Phumelela	Afrikaans 40%; Zulu 33%; Sotho 16%; English 5%; foreign languages 3%
Vierfontein	657	647	Moqhaka	Afrikaans 75%; Sotho 16%; English 5%; Tswana 2%; Xhosa 2%
Petrusburg	648	540	Letsemeng	Tswana 27%; Xhosa 25%; Sotho 22%; Afrikaans 21%
Zastron	639	644	Mohokare	Sotho 35%; Afrikaans 34%; Xhosa 22%; English 3%; foreign languages 3%; Tswana 2%
Clocolan	623	658	Setsoto	Afrikaans 47%; Sotho 36%; English 14%; Sign Language 2%
Dewetsdorp	605	597	Naledi	Sotho 85%; Afrikaans 8%; Xhosa 3%
Koppies (Kopjes)	531	631	Ngwathe	Afrikaans 58%; Sotho 33%; foreign languages 3%; English 2%; Zulu 2%
Reddersburg	529	742	Kopanong	Afrikaans 85%; Sotho 7%; Xhosa 3%; English 2%
Kestell	521	601	Maluti-a-Phofung	Afrikaans 50%; Sotho 31%; English 12%; Zulu 3%
Bethulie	514	663	Kopanong	Afrikaans 52%; Sotho 20%; Xhosa 19%; English 6%
Jacobsdal	505	432	Letsemeng	Afrikaans 93%; Sotho 3%
Marquard	493	589	Setsoto	Afrikaans 53%; Sotho 29%; English 11%; foreign languages 4%
Koffiefontein	488	854	Letsemeng	Afrikaans 63%; Sotho 14%; Xhosa 12%; Tswana 7%
Holly Country (Clydesdale)	444	345	Metsimaholo	Afrikaans 64%; English 11%; Sotho 7%; foreign languages 4%; Pedi 3%; Zulu 2%; Swazi 2%; Xhosa 2%; Tsonga 2%; Tswana 2%
Clarens	438	543	Dihlabeng	Afrikaans 46%; English 44%; Sotho 7%; foreign languages 2%
Petrus Steyn	437	579	Nketoana	Afrikaans 78%; English 9%; Sotho 7%; Zulu 3%
Edenburg	436	220	Kopanong	Afrikaans 77%; Sotho 15%; English 3%; Xhosa 3%
Lindley	429	491	Nketoana	Afrikaans 43%; Sotho 41%; foreign languages 4%; Zulu 4%; English 3%; Xhosa 2%
Dealesville	397	331	Tokologo	Tswana 57%; Xhosa 19%; Sotho 10%; Afrikaans 9%; English 2%
Steynsrus	397	847	Moqhaka	Afrikaans 59%; Sotho 26%; English 8%; foreign languages 2%; Zulu 2%

=== Gauteng ===
The results of the 2011 census showed a Gauteng white population of 1,913,884, a slight decrease from the 1,923,829 recorded in 2007 but an increase from 1,735,094 in 2001 and 1,702,343 in 1996.

Just over 85% of the Gauteng white population live in one of the three Metropolitan Municipalities of Tshwane (30.6%), Johannesburg (28.4%) and Ekurhuleni (26.3%).

The 65 main places with a 2011 population of more than 550 white persons are listed below: (Although population figures are shown for both 2001 and 2011, these numbers are not necessarily directly comparable due to numerous changes in administrative boundaries.)

Main Place	2011	2001	Municipality	Predominant languages in each particular main place (excluding languages spoken by less than 1.5% of the total population)
Pretoria	389,022	355,631	City of Tshwane	Afrikaans 48%; English 16%; Pedi 8%; Tswana 6%; foreign languages 5%; Zulu 4%; Sotho 4%; Tsonga 3%; Venda 3%; Xhosa 2%; Ndebele 2%
Randburg	153,882 (Note: (includes parts of northern Johannesburg e.g. Berario, Blackheath, Craighall, Craighall Park, Dunkeld, Emmarentia, Fairland, Greenside, Greymont, Linden, Newlands, Northcliff, Parkhurst, Parkview, Parkwood, Rosebank, Saxonwold and Westcliff)) (Note: (includes parts of eastern Roodepoort e.g. Bergbron, Delarey, Maraisburg, Quellerina and Whiteridge))	89,310	City of Johannesburg	English 52%; Afrikaans 18%; Zulu 7%; foreign languages 5%; Tswana 4%; Xhosa 3%; Pedi 3%; Sotho 3%; Ndebele 2%; Tsonga 2%; Venda 2%
Centurion	139,501	90,997	City of Tshwane	Afrikaans 49%; English 26%; Pedi 5%; Tswana 4%; Zulu 3%; Sotho 3%; Xhosa 3%; foreign languages 2%
Johannesburg	133,379 (Note: (excludes parts of northern Johannesburg e.g. Berario, Blackheath, Craighall, Craighall Park, Dunkeld, Emmarentia, Fairland, Greenside, Greymont, Linden, Newlands, Northcliff, Parkhurst, Parkview, Parkwood, Rosebank, Saxonwold and Westcliff))	231,263 (includes all of the former city of Johannesburg)	City of Johannesburg	English 31%; Zulu 20%; Afrikaans 12%; foreign languages 8%; Xhosa 5%; Ndebele 5%; Sotho 5%; Pedi 5%; Tswana 4%; Tsonga 3%; Venda 2%
Roodepoort	115,541 (Note: (excludes parts of eastern Roodepoort e.g. Bergbron, Delarey, Maraisburg, Quellerina and Whiteridge))	98,995 (includes all of the former city of Roodepoort)	City of Johannesburg	English 30%; Afrikaans 24%; Zulu 9%; Tswana 9%; Pedi 5%; Xhosa 5%; Sotho 5%; foreign languages 4%; Venda 4%; Tsonga 3%; Ndebele 3%
Sandton	110,723	76,062	City of Johannesburg	English 64%; Afrikaans 7%; Zulu 6%; foreign languages 6%; Pedi 3%; Tswana 3%; Xhosa 3%; Sotho 2%; Tsonga 2%; Ndebele 2%
Kempton Park	80,388	82,830	Ekurhuleni	Afrikaans 35%; English 26%; Zulu 9%; Pedi 8%; foreign languages 5%; Sotho 4%; Tswana 3%; Xhosa 3%; Tsonga 2%; Venda 2%; Ndebele 2%
Germiston (Greater Germiston)	80,034 (includes Bedfordview)	69,526	Ekurhuleni	English 24%; Afrikaans 17%; Zulu 17%; Xhosa 10%; Pedi 8%; Sotho 7%; foreign languages 6%; Tsonga 4%; Venda 3%; Tswana 3%; Ndebele 2%
Boksburg	73,887	69,987	Ekurhuleni	Afrikaans 29%; English 19%; Zulu 15%; Pedi 9%; Xhosa 8%; Sotho 7%; Tsonga 4%; foreign languages 3%; Tswana 2%; Ndebele 2%
Krugersdorp	70,636	52,203	Mogale City	Afrikaans 42%; English 20%; Tswana 15%; Zulu 5%; Xhosa 4%; Sotho 4%; foreign languages 3%; Pedi 3%; Tsonga 2%; Venda 2%; Ndebele 2%
Alberton	64,675	61,018	Ekurhuleni	Afrikaans 43%; English 35%; Zulu 7%; Sotho 5%; Xhosa 3%; foreign languages 2%; Pedi 2%; Tswana 2%
Benoni	60,421	56,076	Ekurhuleni	English 41%; Afrikaans 19%; Zulu 17%; Pedi 5%; Sotho 3%; Tsonga 3%; foreign languages 3%; Xhosa 3%; Ndebele 2%; Tswana 2%
Vanderbijlpark	52,174	56,103	Emfuleni	Afrikaans 51%; Sotho 20%; English 10%; Zulu 5%; foreign languages 3%; Xhosa 3%; Tswana 2%; Pedi 2%
Springs	44,075	43,427	Ekurhuleni	Afrikaans 30%; Zulu 21%; English 16%; Pedi 8%; Xhosa 7%; Sotho 6%; Tsonga 3%; foreign languages 3%; Tswana 2%; Ndebele 2%
Brakpan	38,956	33,879	Ekurhuleni	Afrikaans 47%; English 17%; Zulu 14%; Sotho 5%; Pedi 4%; foreign languages 3%; Tsonga 3%; Xhosa 3%; Tswana 2%; Ndebele 2%
Vereeniging	33,018	34,933	Emfuleni	Afrikaans 35%; Sotho 26%; English 16%; Zulu 8%; Xhosa 4%; Tswana 3%; foreign languages 3%; Pedi 2%
Edenvale	32,570	31,622	Ekurhuleni	English 72%; Afrikaans 12%; foreign languages 4%; Zulu 4%; Pedi 2%; Xhosa 2%
Randfontein	29,074	25,991	Randfontein	Afrikaans 52%; Tswana 18%; English 8%; Sotho 5%; Xhosa 5%; Zulu 4%; Pedi 3%; Tsonga 2%; foreign languages 2%
Meyerton	26,852 (includes Henley on Klip and Daleside)	11,457	Midvaal	Afrikaans 42%; Sotho 23%; English 12%; Zulu 9%; Xhosa 5%; Pedi 2%; Tsonga 2%; foreign languages 2%
Midrand	21,168	16,378	City of Johannesburg	English 50%; Zulu 10%; Afrikaans 7%; foreign languages 6%; Xhosa 5%; Tswana 5%; Pedi 5%; Sotho 5%; Tsonga 2%; Venda 2%; Ndebele 2%
Bedfordview	15,432 (Note: (comprises Bedford Gardens, Morninghill, Senderwood, Bedford Park, St Andrews, Oriel and Essexwold)) (included in Greater Germiston)	14,974	Ekurhuleni	English 70%; foreign languages 9%; Afrikaans 8%; Zulu 4%; Pedi 2%; Sotho 2%; Xhosa 2%
Akasia	14,220	14,726	City of Tshwane	Tswana 24%; Afrikaans 23%; Pedi 12%; English 10%; Sotho 8%; Zulu 7%; Tsonga 5%; Venda 3%; Xhosa 3%; foreign languages 3%; Ndebele 2%
Heidelberg	13,251	8,139	Lesedi	Afrikaans 38%; Zulu 25%; Sotho 18%; English 9%; Xhosa 3%; foreign languages 2%
Nigel	12,799	13,043	Ekurhuleni	Afrikaans 44%; Zulu 23%; English 16%; Sotho 5%; Xhosa 3%; Tswana 2%; foreign languages 2%; Pedi 2%
Midstream (Centurion East)	8,325 (includes Midlands and Midfield)	485 (included in Kempton Park North)	Ekurhuleni	Afrikaans 59%; English 25%; Tswana 3%; Zulu 3%; Sotho 2%; Pedi 2%;
Fochville	6,813	8,545	Merafong City	Afrikaans 71%; English 7%; Sotho 6%; Tswana 6%; Xhosa 4%; Zulu 2%
Carletonville	6,300	9,921	Merafong City	Afrikaans 25%; Xhosa 20%; Tswana 13%; Sotho 13%; English 9%; Zulu 8%; Tsonga 4%; Pedi 2%; foreign languages 2%; Swazi 2%
Boardwalk (Kungwini West)	5,964	1,383 (Shere and Olympus combined)	City of Tshwane	Afrikaans 54%; English 25%; Pedi 3%; Tswana 3%; Zulu 3%; foreign languages 3%; Sotho 2%; Xhosa 2%
Bronkhorstspruit	5,580	5,095	City of Tshwane	Afrikaans 47%; Ndebele 11%; English 10%; Pedi 9%; Zulu 8%; Sotho 4%; Tswana 4%; foreign languages 3%; Swazi 2%; Tsonga 2%
Rayton	4,959	2,754	City of Tshwane	Afrikaans 59%; Pedi 11%; English 8%; Ndebele 4%; Tsonga 4%; Zulu 4%; foreign languages 4%; Tswana 2%; Sotho 2%; Venda 2%
Dainfern	4,026	1,652 (included in Randburg)	City of Johannesburg	English 65%; foreign languages 16%; Afrikaans 5%; Zulu 4%; Pedi 2%; Tswana 2%; Xhosa 2%; Sotho 2%
Walkerville	3,610	3,619	Midvaal	English 35%; Afrikaans 18%; Zulu 15%; Sotho 13%; Xhosa 5%; foreign languages 5%; Tswana 3%; Ndebele 2%; Pedi 2%
Oberholzer	3,330	3,975	Merafong City	Afrikaans 55%; Tswana 12%; English 11%; Sotho 9%; Xhosa 5%; Zulu 3%; foreign languages 2%
Westonaria	3,273	4,631	Westonaria	Afrikaans 29%; Xhosa 17%; Sotho 14%; Tswana 13%; English 8%; Zulu 7%; Tsonga 4%; foreign languages 2%; Pedi 2%; Venda 2%
Cullinan	2,759	2,125	City of Tshwane	Afrikaans 49%; Pedi 16%; English 9%; Sotho 6%; Tswana 5%; Zulu 5%; Ndebele 3%; Xhosa 3%; Tsonga 2%
Haakdoornboom	2,172	n. a.	City of Tshwane	Afrikaans 50%; Pedi 9%; English 7%; foreign languages 7%; Tsonga 6%; Tswana 5%; Zulu 4%; Ndebele 3%; Sotho 3%; Swazi 2%
Kameeldrift	2,049	1,395	City of Tshwane	Pedi 29%; Afrikaans 28%; Ndebele 8%; Tsonga 7%; Sotho 5%; English 5%; Zulu 4%; Tswana 4%; Venda 4%; foreign languages 3%"
Welverdiend	1,803	1,610	Merafong City	Afrikaans 65%; Tswana 13%; Sotho 7%; Xhosa 6%; English 4%; Zulu 3%
Soweto	1,421	325	City of Johannesburg	Zulu 37%; Sotho 16%; Tswana 13%; Tsonga 9%; Xhosa 9%; Pedi 5%; Venda 5%; English 2%
Glen Harvie	1,313	2,337	Westonaria	Xhosa 26%; Sotho 17%; Afrikaans 14%; Tsonga 13%; Zulu 12%; Tswana 5%; Swazi 5%; English 3%; foreign languages 2%
Waterval	1,200	n.a.	City of Tshwane	Afrikaans 47%; Pedi 13%; Tswana 7%; Tsonga 7%; English 6%; Sotho 5%; foreign languages 4%; Venda 3%; Zulu 3%; Ndebele 3%
Grootvlei	1,180	497	City of Tshwane	Afrikaans 64%; English 7%; Pedi 6%; foreign languages 5%; Tsonga 5%; Tswana 3%; Sotho 5%; Zulu 2%; Ndebele 2%
Bultfontein	1,075	1,657	City of Tshwane	Afrikaans 61%; English 9%; Pedi 7%; Tsonga 6%; Tswana 5%; Zulu 3%; Ndebele 3%; Sotho 3%; foreign languages 2%
Viskuil	954	1,509	Lesedi	Afrikaans 59%; Zulu 14%; English 12%; Ndebele 3%; Pedi 3%; Tsonga 2%; Sotho 2%
Chartwell	864	796	City of Johannesburg	English 51%; Afrikaans 11%; Zulu 10%; foreign languages 8%; Ndebele 7%; Pedi 4%; Xhosa 3%; Tswana 3%; Sotho 2%
Grootfontein country estates	859	n.a.	City of Tshwane	Afrikaans 47%; English 17%; foreign languages 8%; Pedi 6%; Zulu 4%; Sotho 4%; Xhosa 3%; Tswana 3%; Ndebele 3%; Tsonga 2%
Endicott	842	188	Lesedi	Afrikaans 41%; Zulu 21%; English 15%; Ndebele 4%; Xhosa 4%; foreign languages 4%; Tsonga 3%; Sotho 2%; Pedi 2%; Tswana 2%
Clayville	831	1,159	Ekurhuleni	Pedi 26%; Zulu 18%; Sotho 9%; Tsonga 9%; Tswana 8%; Afrikaans 7%; English 7%; Venda 6%; Xhosa 4%; foreign languages 3%; Ndebele 2%; Swazi 2%
Zwartkop (Lammermoor)	822	762	Mogale City	English 25%; Zulu 14%; Afrikaans 13%; Tswana 13%; foreign languages 10%; Sotho 5%; Pedi 5%; Xhosa 4%; Tsonga 4%; Venda 3%; Ndebele 3%
Venterspost (Venterspos)	809	536	Westonaria	Afrikaans 53%; English 13%; Tswana 11%; Xhosa 6%; Sotho 6%; Zulu 5%; Tsonga 2%; Pedi 2%
Hillshaven	806	1,088	Westonaria	Afrikaans 32%; Sotho 13%; Xhosa 12%; Zulu 9%; Tsonga 9%; Tswana 9%; English 5%; Pedi 4%; Swazi 2%; Venda 2%; foreign languages 2%
Bon Accord	797	685	City of Tshwane	Afrikaans 33%; English 14%; Pedi 13%; Tsonga 11%; foreign languages 5%; Tswana 4%; Ndebele 4%; Sotho 3%; Zulu 3%; Venda 3%; Xhosa 3%
Randvaal (Gardenvale)	753 (Randvaal and Gardenvale combined)	3,987 (includes Henley on Klip and Daleside)	Midvaal	Sotho 30%; Afrikaans 22%; English 16%; Zulu 10%; Pedi 7%; Xhosa 6%; Tsonga 4%; Swazi 2%
Deelkraal	722	867	Merafong City	Afrikaans 44%; Xhosa 16%; Sotho 11%; Tswana 8%; English 7%; Zulu 4%; Tsonga 4%; foreign languages 3%
Derdepoort	697	1,416	City of Tshwane	Afrikaans 54%; Pedi 12%; English 8%; Ndebele 5%; Tswana 4%; foreign languages 4%; Zulu 4%; Sotho 3%; Tsonga 2%
Mooiplaas	664	874	City of Tshwane	Pedi 25%; foreign languages 20%; Tsonga 14%; Ndebele 9%; Venda 6%; Sotho 6%; Zulu 6%; Tswana 4%; Afrikaans 4%; English 3%; Xhosa 2%
De Deur	647	419 (included in Vereeniging North)	Midvaal	Sotho 24%; Zulu 21%; English 17%; Afrikaans 17%; Xhosa 7%; foreign languages 5%; Tswana 3%; Pedi 2%; Tsonga 2%
Tierpoort	643	778	City of Tshwane	Afrikaans 51%; English 14%; Ndebele 8%; Pedi 6%; Tsonga 6%; foreign languages 4%; Zulu 4%; Sotho 3%; Tswana 2%
Leeufontein (Leeuwfontein)	638	244	City of Tshwane	Afrikaans 34%; Pedi 25%; Tsonga 7%; Zulu 6%; English 6%; Tswana 5%; Ndebele 5%; foreign languages 3%; Sotho 3%; Venda 2%; Swazi 2%; Xhosa 2%
Vaalbank (Valtaki)	628	170	City of Tshwane	Afrikaans 38%; Ndebele 22%; Zulu 9%; English 7%; Pedi 6%; Tsonga 5%; foreign languages 4%; Sotho 4%; Tswana 2%; Xhosa 2%
Sizanani Village (Roodepoort)	617	n.a.	City of Tshwane	Afrikaans 43%; Ndebele 13%; Zulu 12%; Pedi 9%; English 8%; Tsonga 4%; Sotho 3%; Swazi 3%; Tswana 3%; Xhosa 2%
Nooitgecht	614	n.a.	Midvaal	English 53%; Afrikaans 24%; foreign languages 6%; Sotho 4%; Zulu 3%; Tswana 3%; Ndebele 2%; Pedi 2%
East Village	594	2,098 (included in East Driefontein)	Merafong City	Xhosa 25%; Sotho 17%; Afrikaans 15%; Zulu 12%; Tsonga 8%; Tswana 6%; English 5%; Swazi 4%; foreign languages 3%; Pedi 2%

=== KwaZulu Natal ===
The 62 main places with a population of more than 340 white persons in 2011 are listed below: (Although population figures are shown for both 2001 and 2011, these numbers are not necessarily directly comparable due to numerous changes in administrative boundaries.)

Main Place	2011	2001	Municipality	Predominant languages in each particular main place (excluding languages spoken by less than 1.5% of the total population)
Durban	91,212	136,951	eThekwini	English 50%; Zulu 33%; Xhosa 6%; foreign languages 4%; Afrikaans 4%
Pietermaritzburg	31,827	43,471 (includes Chase Valley and Ashburton)	The Msunduzi	Zulu 57%; English 29%; Afrikaans 4%; Xhosa 4%; Sotho 2%; foreign languages 2%
Pinetown	25,876	25,316	eThekwini	Zulu 55%; English 31%; Afrikaans 4%; Xhosa 3%; Sotho 2%; foreign languages 2%
Richards Bay	17,276	11,214	uMhlatuze	Zulu 41%; English 34%; Afrikaans 22%
Newcastle	13,223	16,922	Newcastle	Zulu 37%; English 35%; Afrikaans 21%; foreign languages 3%
Umhlanga	12,925	11,523	eThekwini	English 79%; Zulu 9%; Afrikaans 6%; foreign languages 2%
Westville	12,824	16,471	eThekwini	English 72%; Zulu 17%; Afrikaans 5%; Xhosa 2%
Margate	12,563 (includes Uvongo, Shelly Beach and Ramsgate Beach)	3,804	Hibiscus Coast	English 36%; Xhosa 23%; Afrikaans 20%; Zulu 18%
Kingsburgh	11,515	11,408	eThekwini	English 53%; Afrikaans 28%; Zulu 15%
Hillcrest	11,233	4,624	eThekwini	English 83%; Afrikaans 8%; Zulu 7%;
Queensburgh	11,063	17,650	eThekwini	English 70%; Zulu 14%; Afrikaans 7%; Xhosa 4%
Kloof	10,050	21,619 (includes Waterfall, Gillitts and Everton HC)	eThekwini	English 45%; Zulu 44%; Xhosa 4%; Afrikaans 3%
Amanzimtoti	9,291	11,404	eThekwini	English 51%; Afrikaans 31%; Zulu 14%
Ballito	8,088	3,274	KwaDukuza	English 43%; Zulu 27%; Xhosa 15%; Afrikaans 9%; foreign languages 3%
Port Shepstone	7,602 (includes Umtentwini and Oslo Beach)	4,191	Hibiscus Coast	English 55%; Zulu 21%; Xhosa 11%; Afrikaans 9%
Howick	7,592	5,392	uMngeni	English 51%; Zulu 40%; Afrikaans 4%
Gillitts	7,367	1,193 (included in Kloof)	eThekwini	English 84%; Afrikaans 7%; Zulu 6%
Empangeni	6,516	7,575	uMhlatuze	Zulu 85%; English 8%; Afrikaans 4%
Hilton	6,311	3,975	uMngeni	English 72%; Zulu 17%; Afrikaans 7%
Waterfall	6,151	4,277 (included in Kloof)	eThekwini	English 79%; Zulu 10%; Afrikaans 8%
Vryheid	5,750	8,395	Abaqalusi	Zulu 80%; Afrikaans 10%; English 6%
Ladysmith	5,358	8,023	Emnambithi / Ladysmith	Zulu 64%; English 23%; Afrikaans 6%; Sotho 2%
Scottburgh	5,332	2,557	Umdoni	English 68%; Zulu 16%; Afrikaans 11%; Xhosa 2%
Outer West Durban	3,989	2,351 (Assegay and Botha's Hill combined)	eThekwini	English 58%; Zulu 24%; Xhosa 8%; Afrikaans 5%
Mount Edgecombe	3,660	1,267	eThekwini	English 84%; Afrikaans 5%; Zulu 4%; foreign languages 4%
Chase Valley	3,024	3,119 (included in Pietermaritzburg)	The Msunduzi	English 74%; Zulu 12%; Afrikaans 9%
Port Edward	2,670	1,853	Hibiscus Coast	English 50%; Afrikaans 24%; Xhosa 12%; Zulu 11%; foreign languages 2%
Dundee	2,501	2,413	Endumeni	Zulu 76%; English 16%; Afrikaans 4%
Umkomaas	1,744	2,047	eThekwini	English 61%; Afrikaans 23%; Zulu 12%
Mtunzini	1,583	863	uMlalazi	English 49%; Afrikaans 34%; Zulu 15%
Glencoe	1,570	1,662	Endumeni	Zulu 77%; English 12%; Afrikaans 8%
Salt Rock	1,381	1,685	KwaDukuza	English 67%; Zulu 13%; Afrikaans 13%; foreign languages 2%
Umdloti	1,363	1,505	eThekwini	English 73%; Afrikaans 14%; Zulu 7%; Xhosa 2%
Hibberdene	1,188	713	Hibiscus Coast	Zulu 61%; English 18%; Afrikaans 16%; Xhosa 3%
Southbroom	1,181	559	Hibiscus Coast	English 54%; Afrikaans 25%; Zulu 11%; foreign languages 4%; Xhosa 3%
Estcourt	1,166	2,243	Umtshezi	Zulu 61%; English 32%; Afrikaans 2%; foreign languages 2%
Eshowe	1,093	1,131	uMlalazi	Zulu 76%; English 18%; Afrikaans 3%
Kokstad	1,058	1,752	Greater Kokstad	Xhosa 73%; English 9%; Afrikaans 7%; Zulu 6%; Sotho 3%
Greytown	1,014	1,522	Umvoti	Zulu 53%; English 37%; Afrikaans 5%; foreign languages 2%
Mandeni (Mandini)	961	1,877	Mandeni	Zulu 48%; English 32%; Afrikaans 15%; foreign languages 3%
Sheffield Beach	928	499 (included in Salt Rock)	KwaDukuza	English 70%; Zulu 14%; Afrikaans 8%; foreign languages 3%; Xhosa 2%
Pongola	927 (Pongola A and Pongola B combined)	1,533	uPhongolo	Zulu 43%; Afrikaans 42%; English 10%; Swazi 2%
Mtubatuba	896	959	Mtubatuba	Zulu 88%; English 6%; Afrikaans 2%; Ndebele 2%
Ashburton	865	584 (included in Pietermaritzburg)	The Msunduzi	Zulu 41%; English 40%; Afrikaans 14%; Xhosa 3%
Inchanga	770	384	eThekwini	English 77%; Zulu 13%; Afrikaans 6%
Drummond	754	1,054	eThekwini	English 73%; Afrikaans 11%; Zulu 8%; Xhosa 4%
Westbrook	703	795	eThekwini	English 69%; Zulu 14%; Afrikaans 12%; Xhosa 2%
Paulpietersburg	694	897	eDumbe	Zulu 49%; Afrikaans 23%; foreign languages 14%; English 12%
Everton HC	688	712	eThekwini	English 78%; Zulu 12%; Afrikaans 6%
Mooi River (Mooirivier)	633	935	Mooi Mpofana	English 49%; Zulu 39%; Afrikaans 5%; foreign languages 4%
Wartburg	611	623	uMshwathi	English 46%; Zulu 23%; foreign languages 21%; Afrikaans 9%
St Lucia	577	452	Mtubatuba	Afrikaans 38%; English 31%; Zulu 23%; foreign languages 2%
Camperdown	555	380	Mkhambathini	English 46%; Zulu 39%; Afrikaans 6%; Sotho 4%; Xhosa 3%
Balgowan	497	n.a.	uMngeni	English 49%; Zulu 37%; Afrikaans 11%
Underberg	474	357	Kwa Sani	Zulu 73%; English 20%; Sotho 2%; Xhosa 2%; Afrikaans 2%
Mtwalume	455	305	Umdoni	Afrikaans 42%; English 41%; Zulu 13%; Xhosa 2%
Mbonambi (Kwambonambi)	448	641	Mfolozi (KwaMbonambi)	Zulu 80%; English 9%; Afrikaans 7%
Zinkwazi Beach	436	291	KwaDukuza	English 56%; Zulu 23%; Afrikaans 9%; Xhosa 4%; foreign languages 4%
Blackburn	376	n.a.	eThekwini	Zulu 70%; Xhosa 16%; English 9%
Stanger (KwaDukuza)	360	806	KwaDukuza	English 48%; Zulu 46%; foreign languages 2%
Phumula (Pumula)	347	322	Hibiscus Coast	English 58%; Afrikaans 28%; Zulu 6%; Xhosa 5%
Nottingham Road	343	n.a.	uMngeni	Zulu 57%; English 35%; Afrikaans 4%; Sotho 2%

=== Limpopo ===
The results of the 2011 census showed Limpopo's white population being 139,359; an increase of 5.2% from 132,420 in 2001. The white population was recorded as 2.6% of the total population, the lowest share of the population in any province and a 0.1% decrease from 2001. Almost a quarter (23.6%) of the mostly-rural white population reside in Polokwane Local Municipality.

The 27 main places with a 2011 population of more than 400 white persons are listed below: (Although population figures are shown for both 2001 and 2011, these numbers are not necessarily directly comparable due to numerous changes in administrative boundaries.)

Main Place	2011	2001	Municipality	Predominant languages in each particular main place (excluding languages spoken by less than 1.5% of the total population)
Polokwane (Pietersburg)	23,730	24,749	Polokwane	Pedi 46%; Afrikaans 20%; English 10%; Venda 7%; Tsonga 6%; foreign languages 5%; Sotho 2%
Mokopane (Potgietersrus)	8,328	9,410	Mogalakwena	Pedi 47%; Afrikaans 28%; English 7%; Tsonga 4%; Ndebele 4%; foreign languages 5%; Sotho 3%
Phalaborwa	7,392	9,526	Ba-Phalaborwa	Afrikaans 51%; English 15%; Tsonga 11%; Pedi 11%; Sotho 2%; Zulu 2%; foreign languages 2%; Venda 2%
Tzaneen	6,721	4,250	Greater Tzaneen	Afrikaans 42%; Pedi 18%; Tsonga 13%; English 13%; foreign languages 6%; Sotho 3%; Venda 2%
Lephalale (Ellisras)	6,555	5,027 (Ellisras and Onverwacht combined)	Lephalale	Afrikaans 39%; Pedi 22%; English 12%; Tswana 8%; Zulu 4%; Venda 3%; Tsonga 3%; Sotho 3%; foreign languages 2%; Xhosa 2%
Louis Trichardt	5,077	5,779	Makhado	Venda 39%; Afrikaans 23%; English 12%; foreign languages 8%; Sepedi 7%; Tsonga 6%; Sotho 3%
Thabazimbi (Thabazimbi A)	4,867	2,300	Thabazimbi	Tswana 54%; Afrikaans 17%; Pedi 10%; English 4%; Tsonga 3%; Xhosa 3%; Sotho 2%; Zulu 2%; foreign languages 2%; Venda 2%
Modimolle (Nylstroom)	4,681	6,569	Modimolle	Pedi 39%; Afrikaans 38%; Tsonga 6%; English 4%; Tswana 4%; Sotho 3%; Venda 2%; foreign languages 2%
Bela-Bela (Warmbaths)	3,691	2,757	Bela-Bela	Pedi 43%; Tswana 18%; Tsonga 12%; Afrikaans 9%; Sotho 6%; English 4%; foreign languages 2%; Ndebele 2%
Mookgophong (Naboomspruit)	2,699	3,075	Mookgophong	Pedi 56%; Tsonga 12%; Afrikaans 11%; Sotho 6%; foreign languages 4%; Ndebele 2%; English 2%; Venda 2%
Musina (Messina)	2,193	1,737	Musina	Venda 49%; Sotho 12%; Pedi 10%; foreign languages 10%; English 5%; Afrikaans 5%; Tsonga 5%; Ndebele 2%
Hoedspruit	1,651	1,460	Maruleng	Afrikaans 45%; English 20%; Pedi 12%; Tsonga 6%; Xitsonga; foreign languages 4%; Tswana 3%; Venda 3%; Swazi 2%; Xhosa 2%; Sotho 2%; Zulu 2%
Burgersfort	1,643	348	Greater Tubatse	Pedi 31%; Afrikaans 28%; English 17%; foreign languages 6%; Zulu 4%; Tswana 3%; Tsonga 3%; Xhosa 2%; Swazi 2%; Sotho 2%
Swartklip Mine (Thabazimbi B)	1,565	1,589	Thabazimbi	Afrikaans 47%; Tswana 19%; English 8%; Xhosa 7%; Pedi 5%; Sotho 5%; Tsonga 4%
Middeldrift (Setaria)	1,293	1,440	Thabazimbi	Afrikaans 55%; Tswana 14%; Sotho 6%; Tsonga 5%; Pedi 5%; English 4%; Xhosa 4%; Zulu 2%; Venda 2%
Groblersdal	1,145	1,096	Elias Motsoaledi	Afrikaans 50%; Pedi 25%; English 7%; foreign languages 4%; Zulu 3%; Ndebele 3%; Tsonga 2%; Tswana 2%; Sotho 2%
Palmietfontein	1,095	670	Polokwane	Afrikaans 56%; Pedi 21%; English 6%; Sotho 4%; foreign languages 4%; Ndebele 2%; Venda 2%; Tsonga 2%
Tweefontein	1,086	831	Polokwane	Afrikaans 42%; Pedi 26%; foreign languages 9%; English 8%; Tsonga 4%; Venda 4%; Sotho 2%; Zulu 2%
Doornbult	1,065	244	Polokwane	Afrikaans 59%; Pedi 21%; foreign languages 7%; English 6%; Ndebele 2%
Marble Hall	928	1,782	Ephraim Mogale	Afrikaans 35%; Pedi 31%; English 12%; foreign languages 5%; Tsonga 4%; Ndebele 4%; Sotho 2%; Zulu 2%
Modjadjiskloof (Duiwelskloof)	870	1,347	Greater Letaba	Afrikaans 44%; Pedi 23%; English 12%; Tsonga 10%; foreign languages 5%; Sotho 3%
Leeukuil	861	763	Polokwane	Afrikaans 56%; Pedi 17%; English 8%; foreign languages 5%; Sotho 4%; Tsonga 3%; Venda 3%
Northam Mine (Northam B)	773	1,020 (Northam Mine and Northam Town combined)	Thabazimbi	Xhosa 32%; Tswana 26%; Tsonga 13%; Sotho 7%; Pedi 6%; Afrikaans 4%; Zulu 4%; foreign languages 3%; English 3%; Swazi 2%
Myngenoegen	654	318	Polokwane	Afrikaans 35%; Pedi 28%; English 14%; foreign languages 13%; Venda 3%; Tsonga 2%; Ndebele 2%
Letaba	640 (included in Kruger National Park)	n.a.	Ba-Phalaborwa	Tsonga 69%; Pedi 8%; Afrikaans 7%; Swazi 4%; English 4%; Sotho 3%; Venda 2%
Northam Town (Northam A)	512	1,020 (Northam Mine and Northam Town combined)	Thabazimbi	Tswana 25%; Xhosa 21%; Afrikaans 17%; Tsonga 12%; Sotho 8%; Pedi 5%; English 4%; Zulu 3%; Swazi 2%
Vaalwater	468	301	Modimolle	Pedi 64%; Afrikaans 11%; Tsonga 8%; Tswana 7%; Sotho 3%; foreign languages 3%

=== Mpumalanga ===
The 59 main places with a 2011 population of more than 200 white persons are listed below: (Although population figures are shown for both 2001 and 2011, these numbers are not necessarily directly comparable due to numerous changes in administrative boundaries.)

Main Place	2011	2001	Municipality	Predominant languages in each particular main place (excluding languages spoken by less than 1.5% of the total population)
Emalahleni (Witbank)	50,810	33,128	Emalahleni	Afrikaans 42%; Zulu 18%; English 14%; Pedi 8%; Swazi 4%; Ndebele 3%; foreign languages 3%; Sotho 3%; Tsonga 2%; Xhosa 2%; Tswana 2%
Middelburg	42,329	18,672	Steve Tshwete (Middelburg)	Afrikaans 50%; Zulu 12%; English 11%; Pedi 8%; Tsonga 4%; Ndebele 7%; Swazi 3%; Sotho 2%; foreign languages 2%
Mbombela (Nelspruit)	28,923	13,803	Mbombela	Afrikaans 41%; English 22%; Swazi 20%; Tsonga 5%; Zulu 3%; foreign languages 2%; Sotho 2%; Pedi 2%
Secunda	28,910	19,088	Govan Mbeki (Highveld East)	Afrikaans 70%; English 13%; Zulu 7%; Sotho 3%
Ermelo	12,198	7,993	Msukaligwa	Zulu 71%; Afrikaans 14%; English 5%; Swazi 4%
Standerton	10,165	8,532	Lekwa	Zulu 48%; Afrikaans 28%; Sotho 8%; English 7%; Xhosa 2%
White River (Witrivier)	10,025	5,639	Mbombela	Afrikaans 42%; English 29%; Swazi 16%; Tsonga 3%; foreign languages 3%; Zulu 2%; Sotho 2%
Lydenburg (Mashishing)	8,599 (Lydenburg and Mashishing combined)	4,804	Thaba Chweu	Pedi 27%; Afrikaans 23%; Swazi 18%; Zulu 13%; Sotho 5%; English 5%; Tsonga 3%; Ndebele 2%; foreign languages 2%
Bethal	8,050	5,138	Govan Mbeki (Highveld East)	Zulu 67%; Afrikaans 13%; Ndebele 7%; English 3%; Swazi 3%
Kriel (Ga-Nala)	6,608	5,335	Emalahleni	Afrikaans 40%; Zulu 23%; English 11%; Ndebele 6%; Swazi 5%; Pedi 5%; Xhosa 4%; Sotho 3%; Tswana 2%
Barberton	5,024	3,303	Umjindi	Afrikaans 48%; English 23%; Swazi 21%; Zulu 2%; Tsonga 2%
Piet Retief	4,617	3,835	Mkhondo	Zulu 83%; Afrikaans 8%; English 5%
Delmas	4,141	2,815	Victor Khanye (Delmas)	Afrikaans 57%; Zulu 16%; Ndebele 9%; English 7%; Pedi 3%; foreign languages 2%; Xhosa 2%; Sotho 2%
Evander	4,079	3,119	Govan Mbeki (Highveld East)	Afrikaans 41%; Zulu 17%; English 13%; Sotho 7%; Xhosa 5%; Pedi 5%; Swazi 4%; Tsonga 3%; Tswana 2%; foreign languages 2%; Ndebele 2%
Volksrust	3,996	3,132	Pixley ka Seme	Zulu 72%; Afrikaans 16%; English 4%; Sotho 2%
Sabie	2,752	1,949	Thaba Chweu	Afrikaans 33%; Swazi 24%; Sotho 14%; English 10%; Pedi 6%; Tsonga 5%; Zulu 3%
Eloff	2,648	923	Victor Khanye (Delmas)	Afrikaans 64%; Zulu 12%; English 7%; Ndebele 5%; Pedi 3%; Sotho 2%; Xhosa 2%
Trichardt	2,371	1,510	Govan Mbeki (Highveld East)	Afrikaans 60%; English 20%; Zulu 7%; foreign languages 3%; Sotho 2%; Xhosa 2%
Belfast	2,350	1,351	Emakhazeni (Highlands)	Afrikaans 56%; Zulu 13%; Swazi 8%; English 7%; Ndebele 5%; Pedi 4%; Sotho 2%; Tsonga 2%
Sundra	1,921	1,306 (includes Rietkol)	Victor Khanye (Delmas)	Afrikaans 63%; Zulu 11%; English 8%; Ndebele 4%; foreign languages 3%; Pedi 2%; Tsonga 2%; Xhosa 2%
Hazyview	1,827	681	Mbombela	Afrikaans 34%; Tsonga 20%; English 17%; Swazi 10%; foreign languages 6%; Sotho 5%; Pedi 5%; Zulu 2%
Rietkol	1,827	377 (Included in Sundra)	Victor Khanye (Delmas)	Afrikaans 56%; Zulu 14%; English 11%; foreign languages 4%; Tsonga 4%; Ndebele 3%; Sotho 2%; Xhosa 2%
Carolina	1,759	958	Albert Luthuli	Zulu 51%; Swazi 26%; Afrikaans 11%; English 4%; Ndebele 4%
Komatipoort	1,612	945	Nkomazi	Afrikaans 31%; Tsonga 28%; Swazi 28%; English 3%; foreign languages 3%
Hendrina	1,559	728	Steve Tshwete (Middelburg)	Afrikaans 69%; Zulu 11%; English 6%; foreign languages 3%; Swazi 2%; Pedi 2%; Sotho 2%
Malalane (Malelane)	1,507	1,299	Nkomazi	Afrikaans 41%; Swazi 26%; English 18%; foreign languages 7%; Tsonga 3%; Zulu 2%
Ngodwana	1,280	540	Mbombela	Swazi 35%; Afrikaans 32%; English 10%; Tsonga 8%; Zulu 5%; Pedi 4%; Sotho 3%
Balfour	1,230	973	Dipaleseng	Afrikaans 39%; Zulu 23%; English 15%; Sotho 12%; Pedi 3%; Tswana 2%; foreign languages 2%
Grootvlei	1,147	n.a.	Dipaleseng	Sotho 41%; Zulu 24%; Afrikaans 21%; Xhosa 4%; English 4%; Pedi 2%
Rietkuil (Arnot)	1,016	n.a.	Steve Tshwete (Middelburg)	Afrikaans 27%; Zulu 19%; Pedi 16%; Swazi 11%; Ndebele 7%; Xhosa 6%; English 5%; Sotho 4%; Tsonga 3%
Graskop	915	668	Thaba Chweu	Afrikaans 29%; Pedi 22%; Sotho 15%; English 11%; Swazi 10%; Tsonga 7%; Zulu 2%; foreign languages 2%
Kinross	878	420	Govan Mbeki (Highveld East)	Zulu 38%; English 13%; Afrikaans 10%; Sotho 7%; Xhosa 7%; Ndebele 6%; Swazi 5%; Pedi 4%; foreign languages 4%; Tsonga 3%; Tswana 2%
Komati	874	n.a.	Steve Tshwete (Middelburg)	Afrikaans 50%; Zulu 15%; English 10%; Swazi 6%; Ndebele 5%; Pedi 4%; Sotho 4%; Xhosa 2%
Emgwenya (Waterval Boven)	868	772	Emakhazeni (Highlands)	Swazi 71%; Afrikaans 14%; English 3%; Zulu 3%; Pedi 2%; Tsonga 2%
Pullens Hope (Hendrinakrag)	850	n.a.	Steve Tshwete (Middelburg)	Afrikaans 25%; Zulu 22%; Swazi 13%; Pedi 11%; Ndebele 7%; English 6%; Sotho 5%; Xhosa 4%; Tsonga 3%; Tswana 3%
Leandra (Eendrag)	844	254	Govan Mbeki (Highveld East)	Afrikaans 39%; Zulu 24%; English 17%; Ndebele 6%; foreign languages 4%; Sotho 2%; Tswana 2%; Swazi 2%; Pedi 2%
Morgenzon	818	547	Lekwa	Zulu 48%; Afrikaans 38%; English 6%; foreign languages 2%; Swazi 2%; Ndebele 2%
Entokazweni (Machadodorp)	716	597	Emakhazeni (Highlands)	Swazi 45%; Zulu 23%; Afrikaans 9%; Ndebele 7%; English 5%; Sotho 3%; Pedi 2%
Wakkerstroom	698	375	Pixley ka Seme	Zulu 86%; English 4%; Afrikaans 4%; Ndebele 2%
Marloth Park	675	286	Nkomazi	Afrikaans 48%; Swazi 23%; English 21%; Tsonga 3%; foreign languages 2%
Emjejane (Hectorspruit)	643	228	Nkomazi	Swazi 55%; Afrikaans 19%; Tsonga 17%; English 4%; foreign languages 2%
Breyten	574	705	Msukaligwa	Zulu 81%; Swazi 5%; Afrikaans 4%; English 3%; Ndebele 2%
Skukuza	559 (included in Kruger National Park)	n.a.	Mbombela	Tsonga 58%; Swazi 12%; Afrikaans 9%; English 7%; Sotho 5%; Zulu 3%; Venda 2%; Pedi 2%
Amersfoort	529	434	Pixley ka Seme	Zulu 84%; Afrikaans 4%; Swazi 3%; English 2%; Sotho 2%
Amsterdam	503	567	Mkhondo	Zulu 79%; Afrikaans 8%; Swazi 6%; English 2%
Dullstroom	470	298	Emakhazeni (Highlands)	English 51%; Afrikaans 42%; Sotho 2%; Ndebele 2%; foreign languages 2%
Badplaas (eManzana)	455 (Badplaas and Manzana combined)	155	Albert Luthuli	Swazi 83%; Afrikaans 4%; Zulu 4%; English 2%; Tsonga 2%
Greylingstad	447	n.a.	Dipaleseng	Afrikaans 52%; Zulu 28%; Sotho 7%; English 4%; Ndebele 2%; Pedi 2%; Xhosa 2%
Sabi-Sand	401 (includes Sabi Sabi, Mala Mala and Londolozi)	n.a.	Bushbuckridge	Tsonga 67%; English 17%; Afrikaans 9%; Swazi 3%
Clewer	391	486	Emalahleni	Zulu 34%; Ndebele 14%; Afrikaans 10%; Pedi 9%; Sotho 8%; Swazi 7%; Xhosa 6%; English 5%; foreign languages 3%; Tsonga 3%
Blinkpan	305	n.a.	Steve Tshwete (Middelburg)	Afrikaans 29%; Zulu 17%; Xhosa 10%; Tsonga 10%; Pedi 9%; Swazi 9%; Ndebele 6%; English 4%; Sotho 4%
Modder East Orchards	303	n.a.	Victor Khanye (Delmas)	Afrikaans 30%; Zulu 26%; Tsonga 11%; Venda 8%; Ndebele 7%; Pedi 4%; English 4%; Swazi 3%; foreign languages 3%; Sotho 2%; Xhosa 2%
M’hati (Mhlatikop)	286	n.a. (included in Malalane)	Nkomazi	Afrikaans 60%; English 19%; Swazi 16%; Sotho 2%; Zulu 2%
Embalenhle (Secunda West)	276	18	Govan Mbeki (Highveld East)	Zulu 50%; Xhosa 11%; Sotho 10%; Ndebele 9%; Swazi 5%; Tsonga 5%; Pedi 4%; English 2%
Leslie	272	300	Govan Mbeki (Highveld East)	Afrikaans 53%; English 13%; Zulu 11%; Sotho 7%; Tsonga 5%; Pedi 4%; foreign languages 3%; Tswana 2%
Botleng (Delmas North)	258	21	Victor Khanye (Delmas)	Zulu 46%; Ndebele 30%; Sotho 5%; Xhosa 4%; Pedi 4%; English 2%; Tswana 2%; Swazi 2%; Tsonga 2%
Greenside Colliery	237	258	Emalahleni	Afrikaans 22%; Sotho 14%; Tsonga 14%; Pedi 11%; Xhosa 11%; Zulu 9%; English 7%; Tswana 5%; Swazi 2%; Ndebele 2%
Kranspoort (Loskop Dam)	212	90	Steve Tshwete (Middelburg)	Afrikaans 49%; Ndebele 15%; English 8%; Zulu 8%; Pedi 7%; Sotho 6%; Swazi 2%; Tsonga 2%; Tswana 2%
Chrissiesmeer (Lake Chrissie)	210	n.a.	Msukaligwa	Zulu 62%; Swazi 27%; Afrikaans 5%; English 2%

=== North West ===
The 42 main places with a 2011 population of more than 300 white persons are listed below: (Although population figures are shown for both 2001 and 2011, these numbers are not necessarily directly comparable due to numerous changes in administrative boundaries.)

Main Place	2011	2001	Municipality	Predominant languages in each particular main place (excluding languages spoken by less than 1.5% of the total population)
Rustenburg	42,308	38,138	Rustenburg	Afrikaans 41%; Tswana 28%; English 12%; Sotho 4%; foreign languages 3%; Xhosa 3%; Tsonga 3%; Zulu 2%
Klerksdorp	33,614	38,007	City of Matlosana	Tswana 43%; Afrikaans 24%; Xhosa 12%; Sotho 11%; English 6%; Zulu 2%
Potchefstroom	30,387	22,999	Tlokwe (Potchefstroom)	Afrikaans 71%; Tswana 11%; English 8%; Sotho 4%; Xhosa 2%
Hartebeespoort (Hartbeespoort)	13,293	5,514	Madibeng	Afrikaans 47%; English 19%; Tswana 7%; Tsonga 6%; Pedi 6%; foreign languages 5%; Sotho 3%; Zulu 2%; Xhosa 2%; Venda 2%
Brits	11,928	9,299	Madibeng	Afrikaans 53%; Tswana 15%; English 10%; foreign languages 5%; Tsonga 5%; Sotho 3%; Pedi 3%; Zulu 2%; Xhosa 2%
Stilfontein	9,963	12,442	City of Matlosana	Afrikaans 53%; Tswana 11%; English 11%; Sotho 10%; Xhosa 8%; Tsonga 2%; Zulu 2%
Lichtenburg	7,989	7,414	Ditsobotla	Tswana 52%; Afrikaans 38%; English 4%
Orkney	6,853	9,446	City of Matlosana	Afrikaans 51%; Sotho 15%; Tswana 10%; Xhosa 9%; English 7%; Tsonga 2%; Zulu 2%
Vryburg	3,754	3,376	Naledi	Afrikaans 56%; Tswana 33%; English 6%
Christiana	2,769	2,588	Lekwa-Teemane	Afrikaans 85%; Tswana 7%; English 4%
Mooinooi	2,765	2,753	Madibeng	Afrikaans 59%; Tswana 13%; English 6%; Sotho 5%; Xhosa 5%; Tsonga 3%; Zulu 2%; Pedi 2%
Doringkruin	2,600	2,170	City of Matlosana	Afrikaans 73%; English 9%; Tswana 7%; Sotho 5%; Xhosa 3%
Zeerust	2,304	2,580	Ramotshere Moiloa (Zeerust)	Afrikaans 35%; Tswana 32%; English 17%; foreign languages 10%
Wolmaransstad (Wolmaranstad)	2,086	2,009	Maquassi Hills	Afrikaans 72%; Tswana 13%; English 8%; foreign languages 3%; Sotho 3%
Waterkloof (Kroondal)	1,904	868	Rustenburg	Tswana 28%; Afrikaans 18%; Tsonga 11%; Xhosa 11%; Sotho 9%; foreign languages 7%; English 4%; Pedi 4%; Zulu 3%; Venda 3%
Schweizer-Reneke	1,765	1,814	Mamusa	Tswana 86%; Afrikaans 6%; Sotho 2%
Ventersdorp	1,692	2,713	Ventersdorp	Afrikaans 47%; Tswana 41%; English 4%; Xhosa 3%; foreign languages 2%
Rietfontein	1,594	n.a.	Madibeng	Afrikaans 28%; Tswana 14%; foreign languages 13%; Pedi 13%; Tsonga 10%; English 8%; Zulu 4%; Venda 4%; Ndebele 3%; Sotho 2%; Xhosa 2%
Mafikeng (Mafeking)	1,492	2,670	Mahikeng (Mafikeng)	Tswana 53%; English 19%; Afrikaans 14%; foreign languages 4%; Sotho 3%; Xhosa 2%; Zulu 2%
Koster	1,463	1,783	Kgetlengrivier	Afrikaans 73%; English 14%; Tswana 10%; foreign languages 2%
Bloemhof	1,448	2,032	Lekwa-Teemane	Afrikaans 72%; Tswana 7%; English 7%; foreign languages 5%; Sotho 4%; Xhosa 3%
Coligny	1,130	1,699	Ditsobotla	Afrikaans 51%; Tswana 35%; English 7%; foreign languages 2%
Hartbeesfontein (Hartbeestfontein B)	1,097	809	City of Matlosana	Afrikaans 81%; Tswana 12%; English 4%; Sotho 2%
Swartruggens	1,031	863	Kgetlengrivier	Afrikaans 57%; Tswana 22%; English 14%; foreign languages 2%; Zulu 2%
Leeudoringstad	1,016	1,330	Maquassi Hills	Tswana 57%; Afrikaans 22%; Sotho 10%; Xhosa 4%; English 2%
Sun City	966 (Sun City and Sun Village combined)	1,816 (includes Sun Village)	Moses Kotane	English 29%; Tswana 26%; Afrikaans 21%; Zulu 10%; Xhosa 3%; Pedi 2%; foreign languages 2%; Sotho 2%; Tsonga 2%
Delareyville	882	1,134	Tswaing	Tswana 78%; Afrikaans 10%; English 5%; Sotho 2%
Sonop	878	1,162	Madibeng	Tswana 38%; Afrikaans 18%; Tsonga 16%; Pedi 10%; Zulu 3%; foreign languages 3%; Venda 3%; English 2%; Sotho 2%
Sannieshof	843	1,179	Tswaing	Tswana 81%; Afrikaans 8%; Xhosa 3%; English 2%; Sotho 2%
Makwassie	661	870	Maquassi Hills	Tswana 74%; Afrikaans 8%; Sotho 8%; Xhosa 5%; Zulu 2%
Stella	556	618	Naledi	Afrikaans 75%; Tswana 18%; English 4%; foreign languages 2%
Retief (Kgaswane)	549	n.a.	Rustenburg	Afrikaans 36%; Tswana 35%; English 10%; Sotho 4%; Xhosa 3%; Pedi 3%; Tsonga 3%; foreign languages 3%; Zulu 3%
Ottosdal	517	1,070	Tswaing	Afrikaans 62%; Tswana 20%; foreign languages 7%; English 6%; Xhosa 2%; Sotho 2%
Lindequesdrif	498	n.a.	Tlokwe (Potchefstroom)	Afrikaans 44%; Sotho 25%; Tswana 8%; Xhosa 7%; English 4%; foreign languages 3%; Zulu 2%
Derby	443	341	Kgetlengrivier	Tswana 76%; Afrikaans 14%; English 4%; Zulu 2%
Waterval	410	760	Rustenburg	Afrikaans 54%; Tswana 19%; English 8%; Xhosa 6%; Sotho 5%; Pedi 3%; Tsonga 3%
Vaal Reefs (Umzimhle)	391	571	City of Matlosana	Xhosa 41%; Sotho 18%; Tswana 12%; Tsonga 8%; Afrikaans 7%; English 4%; Zulu 3%; Swazi 2%
Mmabatho	367	487	Mahikeng (Mafikeng)	Tswana 74%; English 9%; Sotho 4%; foreign languages 3%; Xhosa 3%; Afrikaans 2%; Zulu 2%
Oorzaak (Wigwam)	356	105	Rustenburg	Afrikaans 41%; Tswana 28%; foreign languages 8%; English 6%; Venda 4%; Tsonga 4%; Xhosa 3%; Ndebele 2%; Sotho 2%
Mooivallei Park	331	300 (included in Potchefstroom)	Tlokwe (Potchefstroom)	Afrikaans 87%; English 10%
Groot Marico	301	n.a.	Ramotshere Moiloa	Tswana 82%; Afrikaans 11%; English 4%
Boschhoek (Boshoek)	300	n.a.	Rustenburg	Tswana 42%; Afrikaans 32%; foreign languages 5%; English 4%; Xhosa 3%; Sotho 3%; Pedi 2%; Zulu 2%; Tsonga 2%; Venda 2%

=== Northern Cape ===
The results of the 2011 census showed a Northern Cape white population of 81,246, a decrease of 20.8% on the 102,519 recorded in 2001. The white population grew in absolute terms the most in Kathu, Kuruman and Orania. During the same period, the white population in Kimberley, Upington and Warrenton declined the most in absolute terms.

The 34 main places with a 2011 population of more than 300 white persons are listed below: (Although population figures are shown for both 2001 and 2011, these numbers are not necessarily directly comparable due to numerous changes in administrative boundaries.)

Main Place	2011	2001	Municipality	Predominant languages in each particular main place (excluding languages spoken by less than 1.5% of the total population)
Kimberley	17,841	24,683	Sol Plaatjie	Afrikaans 55%; Tswana 19%; English 16%; Xhosa 5%; Sotho 2%
Upington	7,542	8,516	//Khara Hais	Afrikaans 94%; English 2%
Kathu	4,394 (Kathu and Sishen combined)	3,788	Gamagara	Afrikaans 45%; Tswana 40%; English 5%; foreign languages 2%; Sotho 2%; Zulu 2%
Kuruman	3,952	3,549	Ga-Segonyana	Afrikaans 77%; Tswana 15%; English 4%; foreign languages 2%
De Aar	2,480	3,432	Emthanjeni	Afrikaans 86%; Xhosa 9%; English 2%
Postmasburg	2,212	1,928	Tsantsabane	Afrikaans 54%; Tswana 34%; Xhosa 3%; Sotho 3%; English 3%; foreign languages 2%
Springbok	1,883	1,935	Nama Khoi	Afrikaans 95%; English 2%
Jan Kempdorp	1,649	1,784	Phokwane	Tswana 64%; Afrikaans 20%; Xhosa 10%; Sotho 2%; English 2%
Douglas	1,602	1,351	Siyancuma	Afrikaans 93%; Tswana 2%; English 2%
Hartswater	1,252	1,133	Phokwane	Afrikaans 48%; Tswana 38%; English 8%; Xhosa 2%
Warrenton	1,158	1,660	Magareng	Afrikaans 73%; Tswana 20%; English 3%; Sotho 2%
Prieska	1,145	1,096	Siyathemba	Afrikaans 93%; Xhosa 4%
Calvinia	1,141	1,376	Hantam	Afrikaans 97%
Kakamas	913	734	Kai !Garib	Afrikaans 93%; Tswana 2%; English 2%
Colesberg	901	544	Umsobomvu	Xhosa 59%; Afrikaans 33%; Sotho 3%; English 2%
Orania	867	507	Thembelihle (geographical) / Orania (political)	Afrikaans 98%; English 2%
Daniëlskuil	862	853	Kgatelopele	Afrikaans 63%; Tswana 31%; English 2%
Lime Acres	803	1,245	Kgatelopele	Tswana 41%; Afrikaans 40%; English 6%; Zulu 4%; Xhosa 3%; Sotho 2%
Barkly West	743	973	Dikgatlong	Afrikaans 64%; Tswana 31%; English 3%
Hopetown	708	680	Thembelihle	Afrikaans 88%; Xhosa 7%; Tswana 2%
Keimoes	667 (Keimoes and Rooikopeiland combined)	1,168 (includes Rooikopeiland)	Kai !Garib	Afrikaans 96%
Port Nolloth	624 (includes McDougalls Bay)	359	Richtersveld	Afrikaans 85%; Xhosa 7%; English 4%
Olifantshoek	560	499	Gamagara	Afrikaans 79%; Tswana 10%; foreign languages 4%; English 2%
Dibeng	509	228	Gamagara	Tswana 49%; Afrikaans 46%
Carnarvon	500	457	Kareeberg	Afrikaans 96%; English 2%
Victoria West	466	402	Ubuntu	Afrikaans 82%; Xhosa 14%
Vanderkloof	432	331	Renosterberg	Afrikaans 90%; English 3%; Xhosa 3%; Tswana 2%
Hotazel	397	238	Joe Morolong (Moshaweng)	Tswana 49%; Afrikaans 38%; English 5%; Sotho 3%
Sutherland	360	346	Karoo Hoogland	Afrikaans 96%; English 2%
Augrabies	340	299	Kai !Garib	Afrikaans 67%; Tswana 29%; English 2%
Aggeneys	323	525	Khâi-Ma	Afrikaans 81%; Xhosa 10%; Tswana 3%; English 3%
Ritchie	317 (Ritchie and Motswedimosa combined)	403	Sol Plaatjie	Afrikaans 88%; Tswana 6%; Xhosa 2%; Sotho 2%; English 2%
Williston	315	444	Karoo Hoogland	Afrikaans 96%
Loeriesfontein	301	328	Hantam	Afrikaans 99%

=== Western Cape ===
The 120 main places with a 2011 population of more than 400 white persons are listed below: (Although population figures are shown for both 2001 and 2011, these numbers are not necessarily directly comparable due to numerous changes in administrative boundaries.)

Main Place	2011	2001	Municipality	Predominant languages in each particular main place (excluding languages spoken by less than 1.5% of the total population)
Cape Town	140,125	167,085 (includes Muizenberg, Athlone and Ruyterwacht)	City of Cape Town	English 68%; Afrikaans 23%; foreign languages 5%; Xhosa 3%
Bellville	56,624	57,156	City of Cape Town	Afrikaans 65%; English 25%; foreign languages 5%; Xhosa 3%
Blouberg (Bloubergstrand)	47,450 (includes Tableview, Sunningdale, Parklands, Richwood and West Beach)	1,373 (included in Milnerton)	City of Cape Town	English 44%; Xhosa 28%; Afrikaans 15%; foreign languages 8%; Sotho 2%; Zulu 2%
Milnerton	45,660 (includes Edgemead and Monte Vista)	59,805 (includes Tableview, Sunningdale, Parklands, Richwood, West Beach and Bloubergstrand)	City of Cape Town	English 56%; Afrikaans 18%; Xhosa 14%; foreign languages 8%
Durbanville	44,607	35,719	City of Cape Town	Afrikaans 59%; English 37%
Brackenfell	35,424	23,572	City of Cape Town	Afrikaans 71%; English 21%; Xhosa 3%; foreign languages 2%
Somerset West	33,142 (includes Briza)	24,948	City of Cape Town	Afrikaans 52%; English 38%; Xhosa 5%; foreign languages 3%
Parow	30,408	38,636	City of Cape Town	Afrikaans 66%; English 27%; foreign languages 3%; Xhosa 2%
George	29,242	25,163	George	Afrikaans 84%; English 10%; Xhosa 4%
Kraaifontein	22,337	18,309	City of Cape Town	Afrikaans 45%; Xhosa 33%; English 14%; foreign languages 3%; Sotho 3%
Paarl	20,051	17,546	Drakenstein	Afrikaans 87%; English 6%; Xhosa 5%
Goodwood	19,083 (includes Ruyterwacht)	37,882 (includes Edgemead and Monte Vista)	City of Cape Town	English 51%; Afrikaans 35%; foreign languages 6%; Xhosa 5%
Strand	19,004	18,450 (includes Admirals Park)	City of Cape Town	Afrikaans 77%; English 14%; foreign languages 4%; Xhosa 2%
Kuils River (Kuilsrivier)	15,211	13,180	City of Cape Town	Afrikaans 60%; English 33%; Xhosa 3%; foreign languages 2%
Worcester	13,626	14,404	Breede Valley	Afrikaans 90%; English 4%; Xhosa 3%
Stellenbosch	12,501	19,920 (includes Cloetesville, La Colline, Dalsig, Onder Papegaaiberg, Paradyskloof and Welgevonden)	Stellenbosch	Afrikaans 71%; English 21%; foreign languages 4%; Xhosa 2%
Gordons Bay (Gordon's Bay)	10,999 (includes Admirals Park)	2,589	City of Cape Town	Afrikaans 59%; English 33%; foreign languages 4%; Xhosa 2%
Hout Bay (Houtbaai)	10,274	7,157	City of Cape Town	English 60%; Afrikaans 33%; foreign languages 4%
Muizenberg	10,241 (includes Marina da Gama)	4,106 (included in Cape Town)	City of Cape Town	English 44%; Afrikaans 23%; Xhosa 15%; foreign languages 13%
Mossel Bay	10,237	8,813	Mossel Bay	Afrikaans 81%; English 9%; Xhosa 7%
Fish Hoek (Vishoek)	9,768	14,973 (includes Sunnydale and Capri Village)	City of Cape Town	English 83%; Afrikaans 13%; foreign languages 2%
Knysna	9,341	6,628	Knysna	Afrikaans 46%; Xhosa 34%; English 15%; foreign languages 2%
Oudtshoorn	9,336	10,686	Oudtshoorn	Afrikaans 87%; Xhosa 6%; English 4%
Melkbosstrand	9,328	5,781	City of Cape Town	Afrikaans 51%; English 43%; foreign languages 2%
Wellington	8,569	6,316	Drakenstein	Afrikaans 81%; Xhosa 11%; English 6%
Noordhoek	7,874 (includes Sunnydale and Capri Village)	2,907	City of Cape Town	Xhosa 47%; English 28%; foreign languages 14%; Afrikaans 5%
Malmesbury	6,440	4,837	Swartland	Afrikaans 86%; English 7%; Xhosa 4%
Vredenburg	5,302	5,074	Saldanha Bay	Afrikaans 69%; Xhosa 19%; English 5%; Sotho 2%; foreign languages 2%
Plettenberg Bay	5,046	3,614	Bitou (Plettenberg Bay)	English 57%; Afrikaans 32%; Xhosa 5%; foreign languages 3%
Onrusrivier (Onrus)	4,658	3,327	Overstrand	Afrikaans 61%; English 36%
Langebaan	4,648	1,770	Saldanha Bay	Afrikaans 76%; English 19%
Hermanus	4,549	4,392	Overstrand	Afrikaans 76%; English 21%
Robertson	4,063	3,747	Langeberg	Afrikaans 93%; English 4%
Saldanha (Saldanha Bay)	3,811	3,226	Saldanha Bay	Afrikaans 70%; Xhosa 20%; English 7%
Simonstown (Simon's Town)	3,706	4,585	City of Cape Town	English 68%; Afrikaans 19%; Xhosa 4%; Zulu 2%; foreign languages 2%; Sotho 2%
Sandbaai (Sand Bay)	3,652	1,990	Overstrand	Afrikaans 69%; English 29%
Sedgefield	3,549	2,287	Knysna	Afrikaans 49%; English 27%; Xhosa 18%; foreign languages 3%
Swellendam	3,412	3,260	Swellendam	Afrikaans 81%; Xhosa 10%; English 5%; foreign languages 2%
Velddrif (Velddrift)	3,260	2,497	Bergrivier	Afrikaans 84%; Xhosa 9%; English 6%
Stilbaai	3,245	2,634	Hessequa (Langeberg)	Afrikaans 85%; English 14%
Bellville North (Cape Metro)	3,205 (includes Burgundy Estate)	882	City of Cape Town	Afrikaans 57%; English 23%; Xhosa 14%; foreign languages 3%
Kommetjie	3,002	2,357	City of Cape Town	Afrikaans 48%; English 48%
Hartenbos	3,000	2,290	Mossel Bay	Afrikaans 93%; English 4%
Bredasdorp	2,954	3,263	Cape Agulhas	Afrikaans 83%; Xhosa 8%; English 4%; foreign languages 3%
Moorreesburg	2,891	2,613	Swartland	Afrikaans 88%; Xhosa 6%; English 3%
Vredendal	2,860	2,939	Matzikama	Afrikaans 87%; Xhosa 7%; English 2%
Gansbaai	2,840	2,220	Overstrand	Afrikaans 53%; Xhosa 40%; English 3%; Sotho 2%
Beaufort West	2,741	2,886	Beaufort West	Afrikaans 91%; Xhosa 4%; English 2%
Groot Brakrivier (Great Brak River)	2,613 (includes Bergsig and Glentana)	345	Mossel Bay	Afrikaans 91%; English 5%
Montagu	2,487	2,268	Langeberg (Breede River / Winelands)	Afrikaans 91%; English 5%
Riversdale	2,480	2,677	Hessequa (Langeberg)	Afrikaans 92%; Xhosa 4%; English 2%
Ceres	2,424	2,969	Witzenberg	Afrikaans 93%; English 4%; Xhosa 2%
Kleinmond	2,411	2,643	Overstrand	Afrikaans 60%; Xhosa 26%; English 8%; Sotho 3%; foreign languages 2%
Wilderness	2,375	1,131	George	Afrikaans 69%; English 24%; Xhosa 5%
Welgevonden	2,220	2,227 (included in Stellenbosch)	Stellenbosch	Afrikaans 77%; English 19%; foreign languages 2%
Caledon	2,036	2,771	Theewaterskloof	Afrikaans 85%; Xhosa 7%; English 3%; Sotho 2%
Piketberg	1,732	1,811	Bergrivier	Afrikaans 93%; Xhosa 2%; English 2%; Sotho 2%
Porterville	1,485	1,512	Bergrivier	Afrikaans 96%; English 2%
Vyf Brakke Fonteinen	1,478	719	Mossel Bay	Afrikaans 55%; Xhosa 30%; English 9%; Sotho 2%
Grabouw	1,409	1,225	Theewaterskloof	Afrikaans 62%; Xhosa 29%; Sotho 5%; English 2%
Struisbaai	1,376	1,178	Cape Agulhas	Afrikaans 85%; English 9%; Xhosa 3%
Klein Brakrivier (Little Brak River)	1,374	1,100	Mossel Bay	Afrikaans 85%; English 13%
Paradyskloof	1,340	916 (included in Stellenbosch)	Stellenbosch	Afrikaans 77%; English 19%; foreign languages 2%
Albertinia	1,279	1,201	Hessequa (Langeberg)	Afrikaans 94%; English 3%
Villiersdorp	1,251	1,522	Theewaterskloof	Afrikaans 57%; Xhosa 25%; Sotho 13%; English 3%
Vanrhynsdorp	1,237	1,251	Matzikama	Afrikaans 95%; English 2%
Onder Papegaaiberg	1,192	902 (included in Stellenbosch)	Stellenbosch	Afrikaans 79%; English 17%; foreign languages 2%
Heidelberg	1,189	1,271	Hessequa	Afrikaans 92%; English 3%; Xhosa 3%
St Helena Bay	1,189	651	Saldanha Bay	Afrikaans 69%; Xhosa 25%; English 4%
Dalsig	1,119	569 (included in Stellenbosch)	Stellenbosch	Afrikaans 72%; English 23%; foreign languages 3%
Franskraalstrand	1,106	830	Overstrand	Afrikaans 88%; English 10%
Reebok	1,059	645	Mossel Bay	Afrikaans 88%; English 10%
Citrusdal	1,044	1,069	Cederberg	Afrikaans 88%; Xhosa 6%; Sotho 2%; English 2%
Tergniet	1,037	601	Mossel Bay	Afrikaans 89%; English 10%
Betty's Bay	1,002	332	Overstrand	Afrikaans 60%; English 36%; foreign languages 2%
Bonnievale	974	1,207	Langeberg	Afrikaans 90%; Xhosa 6%; English 2%
Lamberts Bay	973	893	Cederberg	Afrikaans 91%; Xhosa 6%; English 2%
Wolseley	957	978	Witzenberg	Afrikaans 88%; English 6%; foreign languages 2%; Xhosa 2%
Hopefield	930	415	Saldanha Bay	Afrikaans 94%; English 3%
Yzerfontein	929	494	Swartland	Afrikaans 72%; English 25%
Napier	917	839	Cape Agulhas	Afrikaans 80%; English 11%; Xhosa 6%
Franschhoek	901	1,039	Stellenbosch	Afrikaans 56%; Xhosa 31%; English 5%; foreign languages 3%; Sotho 3%
La Colline	892	79 (included in Stellenbosch)	Stellenbosch	Afrikaans 63%; English 21%; foreign languages 10%; Xhosa 2%
Prince Alfred Hamlet	886	816	Witzenberg	Afrikaans 87%; Xhosa 7%; Sotho 4%; English 2%
Klawer	849	831	Matzikama	Afrikaans 89%; Xhosa 5%; Sign Language 3%
Darling	831	710	Swartland	Afrikaans 61%; English 34%; foreign languages 4%
Ladismith	818	1,082	Kannaland	Afrikaans 95%; English 3%
Prince Albert	795	746	Prince Albert	Afrikaans 92%; English 5%
Athlone	777	93 (included in Cape Town)	City of Cape Town	Afrikaans 52%; English 44%; Xhosa 2%
Blue Downs	774 (combined with Blackheath)	265 (includes Blackheath)	City of Cape Town	Afrikaans 60%; Xhosa 18%; English 17%; foreign languages 2%
Cloetesville	750	36 (included in Stellenbosch)	Stellenbosch	Afrikaans 94%; English 3%
Scarborough	748	690	City of Cape Town	English 68%; Afrikaans 19%; Xhosa 7%; foreign languages 3%
Rawsonville	741	831	Breede Valley	Afrikaans 95%; Xhosa 2%; English 2%
Lutzville	703	783	Matzikama	Afrikaans 91%; Xhosa 4%; English 2%
Riebeek Kasteel	702	550	Swartland	Afrikaans 79%; English 18%
De Doorns	673	738	Breede Valley	Afrikaans 64%; Xhosa 25%; Sotho 4%; English 3%; foreign languages 3%
Pringle Bay	673	526	Overstrand	English 51%; Afrikaans 44%; foreign languages 4%
Atlantis	671 (combined with Cape Farms)	559 (includes Cape Farms)	City of Cape Town	Afrikaans 79%; English 10%; Xhosa 8%
Greyton	668	296	Theewaterskloof	Afrikaans 74%; English 22%
Ashton	666	854	Langeberg	Afrikaans 95%
Philippi	659	54 (included in Mitchells Plain)	City of Cape Town	Xhosa 79%; Afrikaans 7%; English 6%; foreign languages 3%
Tulbagh	623	596	Witzenberg	Afrikaans 74%; Xhosa 18%; English 4%; Sotho 2%
Clanwilliam	588	919	Cederberg	Afrikaans 78%; Sotho 9%; Xhosa 8%; English 22%
Mitchells Plain	581	1,405 (includes Philippi)	City of Cape Town	English 47%; Afrikaans 47%; Xhosa 3%
Riviersonderend	574	578	Theewaterskloof	Afrikaans 87%; Xhosa 8%; English 3%
Touwsrivier	534	684	Breede Valley	Afrikaans 93%; English 3%
Fisherhaven	504	354	Overstrand	Afrikaans 51%; English 46%; foreign languages 2%
Barrydale	494	503	Swellendam	Afrikaans 91%; English 7%
Grassy Park	482	162 (included in Cape Town)	City of Cape Town	English 58%; Afrikaans 38%; Xhosa 2%
Laingsburg	481	608	Laingsburg	Afrikaans 94%; English 2%; Xhosa 2%
Agulhas (L'Agulhas)	472	363	Cape Agulhas	Afrikaans 81%; English 17%
Stanford	463	477	Overstrand	Afrikaans 66%; Xhosa 25%; English 7%
Van Dyks Bay	458	181	Overstrand	Afrikaans 91%; English 9%
Riebeek West	456	318	Swartland	Afrikaans 94%; English 4%
Herolds Bay	434	419	George	Afrikaans 90%; English 10%
Macassar	413	63 (included in Somerset West)	City of Cape Town	Afrikaans 85%; English 7%; Xhosa 5%
Botrivier	407	256	Theewaterskloof	Afrikaans 76%; Xhosa 15%; English 5%
Pearly Beach	407	448	Overstrand	Afrikaans 46%; Xhosa 44%; English 9%
Uniondale	404	548	George	Afrikaans 95%; English 2%
McGregor	400	344	Langeberg	Afrikaans 87%; English 10%

== By percentage ==
Biggest percentages of 'white' population per local municipality according to the 2022 National Census.

Percentage by municipality
Municipality	Province	Percentage in 2022 Census	Number of white people in the municipality
Midvaal Local Municipality	Gauteng	27.3%	30,589
Overstrand Local Municipality	Western Cape	33.5%	44,380
Mossel Bay Local Municipality	Western Cape	34.1%	47,734
Hessequa Local Municipality	Western Cape	22.0%	15,826
Steve Tshwete Local Municipality	Mpumalanga	11.1%	26,857
Cape Agulhas Local Municipality	Western Cape	23.4%	9,373
Knysna Local Municipality	Western Cape	21.8%	20,938
Mogale City Local Municipality	Gauteng	12.5%	54,654
JB Marks Local Municipality	North West	10.7%	22,851
Rand West City Local Municipality	Gauteng	8.5%	28,370
City of Tshwane Metropolitan Municipality	Gauteng	13.4%	542,114
George Local Municipality	Western Cape	18.4%	54,372
Lesedi Local Municipality	Gauteng	12.3%	16,372
UMngeni Local Municipality	KwaZulu-Natal	22.9%	24,013
Stellenbosch Local Municipality	Western Cape	23.3%	40,819
Saldanha Bay Local Municipality	Western Cape	16.5%	25,542
Kouga Local Municipality	Eastern Cape	29.9%	31,969
Swellendam Local Municipality	Western Cape	16.7%	7,827
Bergrivier Local Municipality	Western Cape	15.4%	10,844
Bitou Local Municipality	Western Cape	16.5%	10,757
Kgetlengrivier Local Municipality	North West	10.0%	5,481
Metsimaholo Local Municipality	Free State	13.9%	21,936
Govan Mbeki Local Municipality	Mpumalanga	8.6%	26,613
Victor Khanye Local Municipality	Mpumalanga	6.3%	6,736
City of Ekurhuleni Metropolitan Municipality	Gauteng	10.3%	416,886
Emalahleni Local Municipality	Mpumalanga	6.5%	28,214
City of Cape Town	Western Cape	16.1%	774,035
Swartland Local Municipality	Western Cape	15.7%	23,343
Matzikama Local Municipality	Western Cape	11.0%	7,581
Karoo Hoogland Local Municipality	Northern Cape	12.8%	1,502
Matlosana Local Municipality	North West	12.6%	54,154
Thaba Chweu Local Municipality	Mpumalanga	10.0%	10,892
Nelson Mandela Bay Metropolitan Municipality	Eastern Cape	15.7%	186,367
Thabazimbi Local Municipality	Limpopo	22.8%	14,796
Ndlambe Local Municipality	Eastern Cape	23.0%	20,114
Gamagara Local Municipality	Northern Cape	18.8%	5,566
Drakenstein Local Municipality	Western Cape	16.8%	46,532
Laingsburg Local Municipality	Western Cape	7.6%	855
Modimolle–Mookgophong Local Municipality	Limpopo	17.6%	22,896
Thembelihle Local Municipality	Northern Cape	19.7%	4,433
Bela-Bela Local Municipality	Limpopo	11.2%	7,195
Oudtshoorn Local Municipality	Western Cape	8.9%	12,294
Langeberg Local Municipality	Western Cape	12.9%	12,100
City of Johannesburg Metropolitan Municipality	Gauteng	10.0%	1,509,800
Hantam Local Municipality	Northern Cape	10.5%	2,345
Emfuleni Local Municipality	Gauteng	7.2%	68,277
Merafong City Local Municipality	Gauteng	8.8%	19,886
Prince Albert Local Municipality	Western Cape	7.0%	1,251
Lekwa Local Municipality	Mpumalanga	8.6%	10,321
Cederberg Local Municipality	Western Cape	7.9%	4,369
Mangaung Metropolitan Municipality	Free State	7.8%	62,970
Emakhazeni Local Municipality	Mpumalanga	6.5%	4,143
Ray Nkonyeni Local Municipality.	KwaZulu-Natal	9.9%	35,738-not update after-
Modimolle Local Municipality	Limpopo	10.8%	7,379
Breede Valley Local Municipality	Western Cape	10.7%	17,864
Inxuba Yethemba Local Municipality	Eastern Cape	10.5%	6,888
Kwa Sani Local Municipality	KwaZulu-Natal	10.5%	1,350
Dihlabeng Local Municipality	Free State	10.4%	13,326
Lekwa-Teemane Local Municipality	North West	10.4%	5,561
Ngwathe Local Municipality	Free State	10.3%	12,445
Tokologo Local Municipality	Free State	9.9%	2,883
[.///Khara_Hais_Local_Municipality //Khara Hais Local Municipality]	Northern Cape	9.9%	9,216
Kannaland Local Municipality	Western Cape	9.9%	2,448
Msukaligwa Local Municipality	Mpumalanga	9.8%	14,707
Umjindi Local Municipality	Mpumalanga	9.8%	6,555
Kgatelopele Local Municipality	Northern Cape	9.8%	1,833
Camdeboo Local Municipality	Eastern Cape	9.6%	4,877
Matjhabeng Local Municipality	Free State	9.6%	39,132
Naledi Local Municipality	Naledi	9.5%	6,352
Kopanong Local Municipality	Free State	9.4%	4,630
Rustenburg Local Municipality	North West	9.4%	51,850
Theewaterskloof Local Municipality	Western Cape	9.4%	28,757
Moqhaka Local Municipality	Free State	9.3%	14,968
Beaufort West Local Municipality	Western Cape	9.2%	4,539
Kareeberg Local Municipality	Northern Cape	9.1%	1,062
Madibeng Local Municipality	North West	8.9%	42,691
Makana Local Municipality	Eastern Cape	8.7%	6,974
Gariep Local Municipality	Eastern Cape	8.7%	2,920
Mbombela Local Municipality	Mpumalanga	8.7%	51,451
Dipaleseng Local Municipality	Mpumalanga	8.6%	3,633
Renosterberg Local Municipality	Northern Cape	8.6%	942
UMdoni Local Municipality	KwaZulu-Natal	8. 5%	6,704
Richtersveld Local Municipality	Northern Cape	8.5%	1,013
Siyathemba Local Municipality	Northern Cape	8.5%	1,827
Tsantsabane Local Municipality	Northern Cape	8.4%	2,933
Kou-Kamma Local Municipality	Eastern Cape	8.2%	3,333
Ditsobotla Local Municipality	North West	8.2%	13,771
Maquassi Hills Local Municipality	North West	8.2%	6,408
Letsemeng Local Municipality	Free State	8.1%	3,120
Kamiesberg Local Municipality	Northern Cape	8.1%	821
Emthanjeni Local Municipality	Northern Cape	8.0%	3,388
Lephalale Local Municipality	Limpopo	7.9%	9,120
Nketoana Local Municipality	Free State	7.8%	4,701
Buffalo City Metropolitan Municipality	Eastern Cape	7.7%	58,258
Witzenberg Local Municipality	Western Cape	7.7%	8,944
Ikwezi Local Municipality	Eastern Cape	7.6%	796
Ubuntu Local Municipality	Northern Cape	7.6%	1,408
Siyancuma Local Municipality	Northern Cape	7.5%	2,777
Sol Plaatje Local Municipality	Northern Cape	7.5%	18,662
Pixley ka Seme Local Municipality	Mpumalanga	7.4%	6,167
Phumelela Local Municipality	Free State	7.3%	3,499
UMhlathuze Local Municipality	KwaZulu-Natal	7.3%	24,563
Endumeni Local Municipality	KwaZulu-Natal	7.2%	4,683
Great Kei Local Municipality	Eastern Cape	7.1%	2,787
Baviaans Local Municipality	Eastern Cape	7.0%	1,244
Mafube Local Municipality	Free State	7.0%	4,064
Westonaria Local Municipality	Gauteng	7.0%	7,862
Tswelopele Local Municipality	Free State	6.9%	3,301
Blue Crane Route Local Municipality	Eastern Cape	6.8%	2,453
Maletswai Local Municipality	Eastern Cape	6.7%	2,920
Masilonyana Local Municipality	Free State	6.7%	4,216
Mantsopa Local Municipality	Free State	6.6%	3,367
EThekwini Metropolitan Municipality	KwaZulu-Natal	6.6%	228,406
Nama Khoi Local Municipality	Northern Cape	6.6%	3,084
Mohokare Local Municipality	Free State	6.5%	2,205
Ba-Phalaborwa Local Municipality	Limpopo	6.4%	9,628
Kai ǃGarib Local Municipality	Northern Cape	6.3%	4,177
Phokwane Local Municipality	Northern Cape	6.3%	3,953
Inkwanca Local Municipality	Eastern Cape	6.2%	1,352
Msunduzi Local Municipality	KwaZulu-Natal	6.0%	36,860
Khâi-Ma Local Municipality	Northern Cape	6.0%	754
Sunday's River Valley Local Municipality	Eastern Cape	5.9%	3,209
Ventersdorp Local Municipality	North West	5.9%	3,346
Nala Local Municipality	Free State	5.8%	4,677
Setsoto Local Municipality	Free State	5.7%	6,367
EMadlangeni Local Municipality	KwaZulu-Natal	5.7%	1,968
Umsobomvu Local Municipality	Northern Cape	5.7%	1,606
KwaDukuza Local Municipality	KwaZulu-Natal	5.6%	12,885
Tswaing Local Municipality	North West	5.6%	6,848
Mamusa Local Municipality	North West	5.5%	3,330
ǃKheis Local Municipality	Northern Cape	5.4%	901
Mpofana Local Municipality	KwaZulu-Natal	5.2%	1,968
Polokwane Local Municipality	Limpopo	5.2%	32,862
Magareng Local Municipality	Northern Cape	5.1%	1,240

Remainder of municipalities have less than 5% of 'whites' as their population.

== See also ==
- Afrikaans-speaking population of South Africa
- Ethnic groups in South Africa by municipality
- White demographic decline
