= Hendrik Alberts =

19th century South African military officer

Hendrik Abraham Alberts
- Born: 7 April 1855; Cape Colony
- Died: 8 September 1906 (aged 51); Honingfontein
- Occupation: Military Commander Author Businessman

General Hendrik Abraham Alberts (7 April 1855 in Hoeko, near Ladismith, Cape Colony – 8 September 1906 in Honingfontein Farm) was a South African military commander, author, and businessman of Afrikaner descent

Alberton and Albertville are named after Alberts, along with the Alberts Farm conservation area near Greymont. The General Alberts Primary School in Alberton is also named after him.

== Background and youth ==
Alberts was the oldest son of Hendrik Abraham Alberts and Martha Magdalena Claassen of Heidelberg, Western Cape. He grew up on his father's farm; little is known of his education other than that he was home-schooled by his mother at least sometimes. Later briefs and war correspondence show a high level of literacy.

After marrying 17-year-old Petronella Johanna Oosthuizen of Ladismith when he was 19, the couple moved to near the other Heidelberg in South African Republic (ZAR), where he would become a wealthy farmer by the outbreak of the Second Boer War.

== Second Boer War ==
With the outbreak of war in October 1899, Alberts enlisted in the Heidelberg commandos and was deployed to the Natal front.

At the Battle of Spion Kop, Alberts served as acting field cornet. After the occupation of Pretoria by British Army troops in June 1900, he retreated with the Heidelberg commandos to Machadodorp. Alberts served as commandant in place of Cmdt. Cornelis Johannes Spruyt, who had been promoted to general. He served in Spruyt's place at the Battle of Lake Chrissie (6 February 1901). When Spruyt was killed in action in July 1901, Alberts was promoted in his stead.

Alberts became General Louis Botha's right-hand man in East Transvaal, such as in the Battle of Bakenlaagte. Alberts was then deployed with several Transvaal commandos to the Orange Free State, fighting over a wide area with Gen. Christiaan de Wet. At the Battle of Kalkkrans, in February 1902, he and the other Boer Republic forces were routed by the British lines, and he had to retreat with General De Wet into the Drakensberg. Afterwards, Alberts returned to East Transvaal to harass British supply lines, in order to relieve pressure on Gen. Botha's forces.

In May 1902, Alberts attended the signing ceremony of the Peace of Vereeniging, where he spoke in favor of accepting the British peace proposal. When the commandos laid down their arms, on 5 June 1902 at Kraal Station, he handed a letter of thanks to his officers.

== Postwar ==
After the war, Alberts returned to work on his farm, but he needed to rebuild his house and barn from scratch. In time, thanks to several profitable real estate transactions, he restored his finances. He remained a fervent supporter of Botha and an active participant in local politics, including the foundation of the Het Volk Party . Alberts also led a syndicate that purchased the ground where the city of Alberton would be built.

In 1905, he began to experience the heart disease that would soon end his life. A.P.J. van Rensburg wrote of him in the Suid-Afrikaanse Biografiese Woordeboek: "fatherlander par excellence, deeply pious, friendly, and approachable, he won a lasting place among the heroes of South Africa." He was survived by three biological sons, two biological daughters, and an adopted son.

== Albert's Farm ==
In the 1890s, according to tradition, Alberts leased 114 acres of the old farm of Waterval to its owner. The original homestead is long gone, but the fenced family graveyard remains. In 1946, Albert's descendants sold 45,000 m² for £18,500 to the city council for public use.

== Sources ==
- Krüger, prof. D.W. and Beyers, C.J. (chief ed.) (1977). Suid-Afrikaanse Biografiese Woordeboek, vol. III. Cape Town: Tafelberg-Uitgewers.
