= Victor Khanye Local Municipality elections =

The Victor Khanye Local Municipality is a Local Municipality in Mpumalanga in South Africa. The council consists of seventeen members elected by mixed-member proportional representation. Nine councillors are elected by first-past-the-post voting in nine wards, while the remaining eight are chosen from party lists so that the total number of party representatives is proportional to the number of votes received. In the election of 1 November 2021 the African National Congress (ANC) won a majority of nine seats.

== Results ==
The following table shows the composition of the council after past elections.

Event	ANC	DA	EFF	FF+	Other	Total
2000 election	10	3	—	—	2	15
2006 election	11	3	—	1	0	15
2011 election	13	3	—	0	1	17
2016 election	11	4	2	0	0	17
2021 election	9	3	1	1	3	17

== December 2000 election ==
The following table shows the results of the 2000 election.

Party	Ward			List			Total seats
Party	Votes	%	Seats	Votes	%	Seats	Total seats
African National Congress	5,954	59.72	6	6,176	64.73	4	10
Democratic Alliance	1,956	19.62	2	2,205	23.11	1	3
Azanian People's Organisation	607	6.09	0	647	6.78	1	1
Independent candidates	1,019	10.22	0				0
Pan Africanist Congress of Azania	434	4.35	0	513	5.38	1	1
Total	9,970	100.00	8	9,541	100.00	7	15
Valid votes	9,970	96.88		9,541	92.76		
Invalid/blank votes	321	3.12		745	7.24		
Total votes	10,291	100.00		10,286	100.00		
Registered voters/turnout	22,353	46.04		22,353	46.02		

== March 2006 election ==
The following table shows the results of the 2006 election.

Party	Ward			List			Total seats
Party	Votes	%	Seats	Votes	%	Seats	Total seats
African National Congress	7,667	72.80	7	7,570	72.43	4	11
Democratic Alliance	1,719	16.32	1	1,672	16.00	2	3
Freedom Front Plus	303	2.88	0	296	2.83	1	1
National Democratic Convention	286	2.72	0	270	2.58	0	0
Pan Africanist Congress of Azania	223	2.12	0	262	2.51	0	0
United Democratic Movement	166	1.58	0	219	2.10	0	0
Inkatha Freedom Party	98	0.93	0	82	0.78	0	0
Azanian People's Organisation	70	0.66	0	80	0.77	0	0
Total	10,532	100.00	8	10,451	100.00	7	15
Valid votes	10,532	97.02		10,451	96.76		
Invalid/blank votes	323	2.98		350	3.24		
Total votes	10,855	100.00		10,801	100.00		
Registered voters/turnout	25,236	43.01		25,236	42.80		

== May 2011 election ==
The following table shows the results of the 2011 election.

Party	Ward			List			Total seats
Party	Votes	%	Seats	Votes	%	Seats	Total seats
African National Congress	11,921	74.67	8	12,111	75.61	5	13
Democratic Alliance	3,174	19.88	1	3,121	19.49	2	3
National Freedom Party	395	2.47	0	389	2.43	1	1
Freedom Front Plus	200	1.25	0	196	1.22	0	0
Congress of the People	169	1.06	0	124	0.77	0	0
Pan Africanist Congress of Azania	105	0.66	0	76	0.47	0	0
Total	15,964	100.00	9	16,017	100.00	8	17
Valid votes	15,964	98.21		16,017	98.60		
Invalid/blank votes	291	1.79		228	1.40		
Total votes	16,255	100.00		16,245	100.00		
Registered voters/turnout	28,664	56.71		28,664	56.67		

== August 2016 election ==
The following table shows the results of the 2016 election.

Party	Ward			List			Total seats
Party	Votes	%	Seats	Votes	%	Seats	Total seats
African National Congress	11,588	63.94	8	11,935	66.22	3	11
Democratic Alliance	3,773	20.82	1	3,764	20.89	3	4
Economic Freedom Fighters	1,779	9.82	0	1,831	10.16	2	2
Freedom Front Plus	515	2.84	0	492	2.73	0	0
Independent candidates	469	2.59	0				0
Total	18,124	100.00	9	18,022	100.00	8	17
Valid votes	18,124	97.85		18,022	97.83		
Invalid/blank votes	399	2.15		399	2.17		
Total votes	18,523	100.00		18,421	100.00		
Registered voters/turnout	33,451	55.37		33,451	55.07		

== November 2021 election ==
The following table shows the results of the 2021 election.

Party	Ward			List			Total seats
Party	Votes	%	Seats	Votes	%	Seats	Total seats
African National Congress	8,997	51.28	8	9,437	53.32	1	9
African Voice Progressive Party	3,268	18.63	0	3,264	18.44	3	3
Democratic Alliance	2,823	16.09	1	2,814	15.90	2	3
Economic Freedom Fighters	1,063	6.06	0	1,130	6.38	1	1
Freedom Front Plus	754	4.30	0	744	4.20	1	1
Sayco Gondwe Civic Movement	175	1.00	0	238	1.34	0	0
Independent candidates	396	2.26	0				0
African Transformation Movement	68	0.39	0	72	0.41	0	0
Total	17,544	100.00	9	17,699	100.00	8	17
Valid votes	17,544	98.21		17,699	98.31		
Invalid/blank votes	319	1.79		304	1.69		
Total votes	17,863	100.00		18,003	100.00		
Registered voters/turnout	34,548	51.70		34,548	52.11		

=== By-elections from November 2021 ===
The following by-elections were held to fill vacant ward seats in the period since the election in November 2021.

Date	Ward	Party of the previous councillor	Party of the newly elected councillor
5 April 2023	5	African National Congress	African National Congress
