= Albertville, Gauteng =

Albertville
- Location within Gauteng Location within South Africa
- Coordinates: 26°09′52″S 27°58′37″E
- Country: South Africa
- Province: Gauteng
- Municipality: City of Johannesburg
- Main Place: Johannesburg

Area
  - Total: 0.88 km^{2} (0.34 sq mi)

Population (2011)
  - Total: 4,649
  - Density: 5,300/km^{2} (14,000/sq mi)

Racial makeup (2011)
  - Black African: 49.6%
  - Coloured: 12.4%
  - Indian/Asian: 5.1%
  - White: 32.4%
  - Other: 0.5%

First languages (2011)
  - English: 35.2%
  - Afrikaans: 31.7%
  - Zulu: 7.8%
  - Northern Sotho: 5.2%
  - Other: 20.1%
- Time zone: UTC+2 (SAST)

Albertville is a suburb of Johannesburg, South Africa. It is located in Region B of the City of Johannesburg Metropolitan Municipality.

== History ==
The suburb is named after the previous landowner Hendrick Abraham Alberts with the land being surveyed in 1896. The land is situated on a portion of an old Witwatersrand farm called Waterval.
