= Lindequesdrif =

- Location within North West (South African province) Location within South Africa
- Coordinates: 26.7572°S 27.5677°E
- Country: South Africa
- Province: North West
- District: Dr Kenneth Kaunda
- Municipality: JB Marks

Area
  - Total: 18.04 km^{2} (6.97 sq mi)

Population (2011)
  - Total: 1,147
  - Density: 63.58/km^{2} (164.7/sq mi)

Racial makeup (2011)
  - Black African: 50.7%
  - Coloured: 5.1%
  - White: 43.4%
  - Other: 0.8%

First languages (2011)
  - Afrikaans: 44.8%
  - Sotho: 24.8%
  - Tswana: 8.0%
  - Xhosa: 7.9%
  - Other: 14.5%
- Time zone: UTC+2 (SAST)

Lindequesdrif is an area comprising agricultural holdings, lying between Vanderbijlpark and Potchefstroom, in the far eastern corner of North West province in South Africa.

It lies on the northern banks of the Vaal River near Sasolburg on the border with the Free State.
