= Shere, Pretoria =

Shere
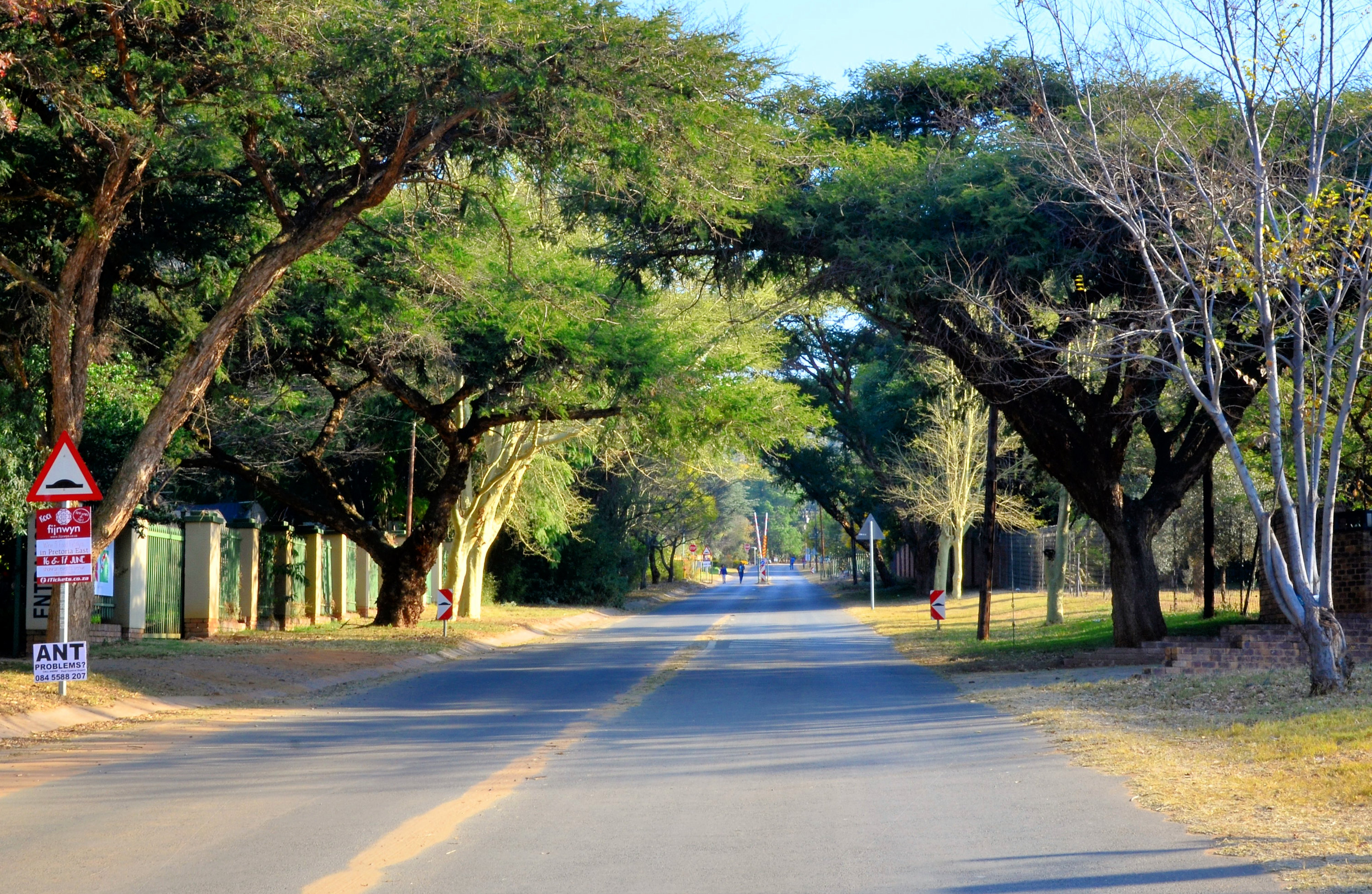

- Location within Gauteng Location within South Africa Location within Africa
- Coordinates: 25°47′30″S 28°21′30″E
- Country: South Africa
- Province: Gauteng
- Municipality: City of Tshwane
- Main Place: Pretoria

Area
  - Total: 3.26 km^{2} (1.26 sq mi)

Population (2011)
  - Total: 47
  - Density: 14/km^{2} (37/sq mi)

Racial makeup (2011)
  - Black African: 42.6%
  - White: 57.4%

First languages (2011)
  - Afrikaans: 53.2%
  - English: 31.9%
  - Zulu: 8.5%
  - Northern Sotho: 2.1%
  - Other: 4.3%
- Time zone: UTC+2 (SAST)
- Postal code (street): 0084
- Area code: 012

Shere is a residential area to the east of Pretoria, South Africa. It lies wedged between the Bronberg and Magaliesberg mountains.
