= Honingfontein =

- Location within Limpopo Location within South Africa
- Coordinates: 23.295°S 30.058°E
- Country: South Africa
- Province: Limpopo
- District: Vhembe
- Municipality: Makhado

Area
  - Total: 1.35 km^{2} (0.52 sq mi)

Population (2011)
  - Total: 1,056
  - Density: 782/km^{2} (2,030/sq mi)

Racial makeup (2011)
  - Black African: 100.0%

First languages (2011)
  - Venda: 85.2%
  - Tsonga: 9.3%
  - Northern Sotho: 4.3%
  - Other: 1.2%
- Time zone: UTC+2 (SAST)

Honingfontein is a town in Vhembe District Municipality in the Limpopo province of South Africa.
