= Eloff =

- Location within Mpumalanga Location within South Africa
- Coordinates: 26.169°S 28.608°E
- Country: South Africa
- Province: Mpumalanga
- District: Nkangala
- Municipality: Victor Khanye

Area
  - Total: 12.31 km^{2} (4.75 sq mi)

Population (2011)
  - Total: 3,968
  - Density: 322.3/km^{2} (834.9/sq mi)

Racial makeup (2011)
  - Black African: 31.3%
  - Coloured: 1.6%
  - Indian/Asian: 0.4%
  - White: 66.8%

First languages (2011)
  - Afrikaans: 63.8%
  - Zulu: 11.9%
  - English: 7.3%
  - S. Ndebele: 4.6%
  - Other: 12.3%
- Time zone: UTC+2 (SAST)
- PO box: 2211

Eloff is a town in Victor Khanye Local Municipality in the Mpumalanga province of South Africa.
