= Seaview, South Africa =

Seaview
- Location within Eastern Cape Location within South Africa
- Coordinates: 34.013°S 25.353°E
- Country: South Africa
- Province: Eastern Cape
- Municipality: Nelson Mandela Bay

Area
  - Total: 2.61 km^{2} (1.01 sq mi)

Population (2011)
  - Total: 1,557
  - Density: 597/km^{2} (1,550/sq mi)

Racial makeup (2011)
  - White: 60.7%
  - Black African: 32.7%
  - Coloured: 6.0%
  - Indian/Asian: 0.2%
  - Other: 0.3%

First languages (2011)
  - Afrikaans: 40.9%
  - English: 27.9%
  - Xhosa: 26.9%
  - Sesotho: 2.1%
  - Other: 2.2%
- Time zone: UTC+2 (SAST)

Seaview is a village in Nelson Mandela Bay in the Eastern Cape province of South Africa.
