= Queensberry Bay =

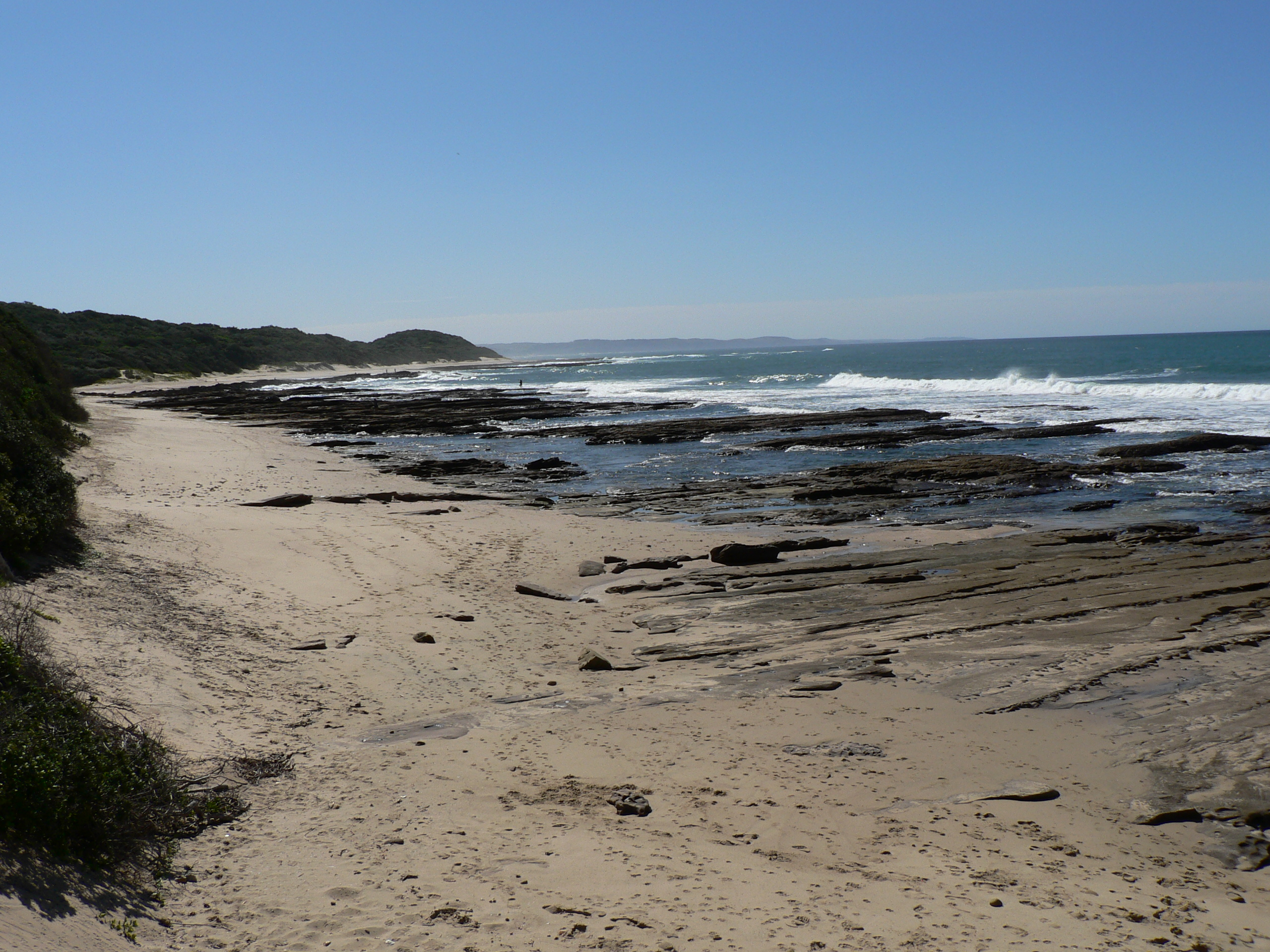
- Queensberry Bay Beach

- Location within Eastern Cape Location within South Africa
- Coordinates: 32.880°S 28.096°E
- Country: South Africa
- Province: Eastern Cape
- District: Amathole
- Municipality: Great Kei

Area
  - Total: 2.25 km^{2} (0.87 sq mi)

Population (2011)
  - Total: 423
  - Density: 188/km^{2} (487/sq mi)

Racial makeup (2011)
  - Black African: 17.5%
  - Coloured: 0.9%
  - Indian/Asian: 0.2%
  - White: 81.3%

First languages (2011)
  - English: 70.6%
  - Afrikaans: 15.6%
  - Xhosa: 12.6%
  - Other: 1.2%
- Time zone: UTC+2 (SAST)

Queensberry Bay is a town in Great Kei Local Municipality in the Eastern Cape province of South Africa.
