= Sundra =

- Location within Mpumalanga Location within South Africa
- Coordinates: 26°10′5″S 28°32′37″E
- Country: South Africa
- Province: Mpumalanga
- District: Nkangala
- Municipality: Victor Khanye

Area
  - Total: 9.83 km^{2} (3.80 sq mi)

Population (2011)
  - Total: 2,850
  - Density: 290/km^{2} (751/sq mi)

Racial makeup (2011)
  - Black African: 28.0%
  - Coloured: 2.5%
  - Indian/Asian: 1.0%
  - White: 68.0%
  - Other: 0.6%

First languages (2011)
  - Afrikaans: 62.5%
  - Zulu: 11.3%
  - English: 8.3%
  - S. Ndebele: 3.8%
  - Other: 14.0%
- Time zone: UTC+2 (SAST)
- PO box: 2200

Sundra is a settlement in Victor Khanye Local Municipality on the border of the Mpumalanga province of South Africa.
