= Parkwood, Johannesburg =

Suburb of Johannesburg, South Africa

Parkwood
- Location within Gauteng Location within South Africa Location within Africa
- Coordinates: 26°09′S 28°01′E
- Country: South Africa
- Province: Gauteng
- Municipality: City of Johannesburg
- Main Place: Johannesburg

Area
  - Total: 1.31 km^{2} (0.51 sq mi)

Population (2011)
  - Total: 2,561
  - Density: 1,950/km^{2} (5,060/sq mi)

Racial makeup (2011)
  - White: 61.8%
  - Black African: 29.1%
  - Indian/Asian: 5.51%
  - Coloured: 2.38%
  - Other: 1.21%

First languages (2011)
  - English: 66.91%
  - Afrikaans: 8.44%
  - Zulu: 6.6%
  - Sepedi: 3.32%
  - Other: 14.73%
- Time zone: UTC+2 (SAST)
- Postal code (street): 2193

Parkwood is a suburb of Randburg, South Africa. It is located in Region E of the City of Johannesburg Metropolitan Municipality.
