= Victor Khanye Local Municipality =

Victor Khanye
- Local municipality
- Seal

- Location in Mpumalanga
- Coordinates: 26°10′S 28°45′E
- Country: South Africa
- Province: Mpumalanga
- District: Nkangala
- Seat: Delmas
- Wards: 9

Government
  - Type: Municipal council
  - Mayor: Vusi Buda

Area
  - Total: 1,568 km^{2} (605 sq mi)

Population (2011)
  - Total: 75,452
  - Density: 48.12/km^{2} (124.6/sq mi)

Racial makeup (2011)
  - Black African: 82.3%
  - Coloured: 1.1%
  - Indian/Asian: 0.3%
  - White: 16.0%

First languages (2011)
  - Zulu: 36.0%
  - Southern Ndebele: 25.4%
  - Afrikaans: 15.9%
  - Sotho: 3.9%
  - Other: 18.8%
- Time zone: UTC+2 (SAST)
- Municipal code: MP311

Victor Khanye Municipality (Zulu: UMasipala iVictor Khanye; Southern Ndebele: UMasipaladi weVictor Khanye; Afrikaans: Victor Khanye Munisipaliteit), formerly Delmas Municipality, is a local municipality within the Nkangala District Municipality, in the Mpumalanga province of South Africa. The seat is Delmas. The local municipality was one of the four to have passed the 2009-10 audit by the Auditor-General of South Africa, who deemed it to have a clean administration. The Victor Khanye Local Municipality is named after Victor Khanye, an ANC activist in the anti-apartheid campaign.

== Main places ==
The 2001 census divided the municipality into the following main places:

Place	Code	Area (km^{2})	Population	Most spoken language
Botleng	80801	5.09	30,793	Zulu
Delmas	80805	13.41	3,496	Afrikaans
Eloff	80803	11.15	1,391	Afrikaans
Sundra	80804	71.38	3,252	Afrikaans
Remainder of the municipality	80802	1,466.21	17,275	Southern Ndebele

== Politics ==
The municipal council consists of seventeen members elected by mixed-member proportional representation. Nine councillors are elected by first-past-the-post voting in nine wards, while the remaining eight are chosen from party lists so that the total number of party representatives is proportional to the number of votes received. In the election of 1 November 2021 the African National Congress (ANC) won a majority of nine seats on the council.

The following table shows the results of the election.

Party	Ward			List			Total seats
Party	Votes	%	Seats	Votes	%	Seats	Total seats
African National Congress	8,997	51.28	8	9,437	53.32	1	9
African Voice Progressive Party	3,268	18.63	0	3,264	18.44	3	3
Democratic Alliance	2,823	16.09	1	2,814	15.90	2	3
Economic Freedom Fighters	1,063	6.06	0	1,130	6.38	1	1
Freedom Front Plus	754	4.30	0	744	4.20	1	1
Independent candidates	396	2.26	0				0
2 other parties	243	1.39	0	310	1.75	0	0
Total	17,544	100.00	9	17,699	100.00	8	17
Valid votes	17,544	98.21		17,699	98.31		
Invalid/blank votes	319	1.79		304	1.69		
Total votes	17,863	100.00		18,003	100.00		
Registered voters/turnout	34,548	51.70		34,548	52.11		
