= Greymont =

- Location within Gauteng Location within South Africa
- Coordinates: 26.163°S 27.964°E
- Country: South Africa
- Province: Gauteng
- Municipality: City of Johannesburg
- Main Place: Johannesburg

Area
  - Total: 0.51 km^{2} (0.20 sq mi)

Population (2011)
  - Total: 2,180
  - Density: 4,300/km^{2} (11,000/sq mi)

Racial makeup (2011)
  - Black African: 25.7%
  - Coloured: 6.2%
  - Indian/Asian: 3.3%
  - White: 63.8%
  - Other: 0.9%

First languages (2011)
  - English: 42.8%
  - Afrikaans: 35.7%
  - Tswana: 4.7%
  - Zulu: 4.3%
  - Other: 12.5%
- Time zone: UTC+2 (SAST)
- Postal code (street): 2195
- PO box: 2035

Greymont is a small suburb of Johannesburg, South Africa. It is located in Region B of the City of Johannesburg Metropolitan Municipality.

== History ==
The suburb was surveyed in 1903 and was part of Roodepoort but in February 1939, it became part of Johannesburg.

== Culture and contemporary life ==
They have a colourful and successful community initiative of revitalising the suburb. A variety of projects are active from clean-up projects to activities to bring them together, such as Yearly Spring Fairs and the Parkrun in the Alberts Farm Park.

Greymont even has a dedicated website showing their latest initiatives.

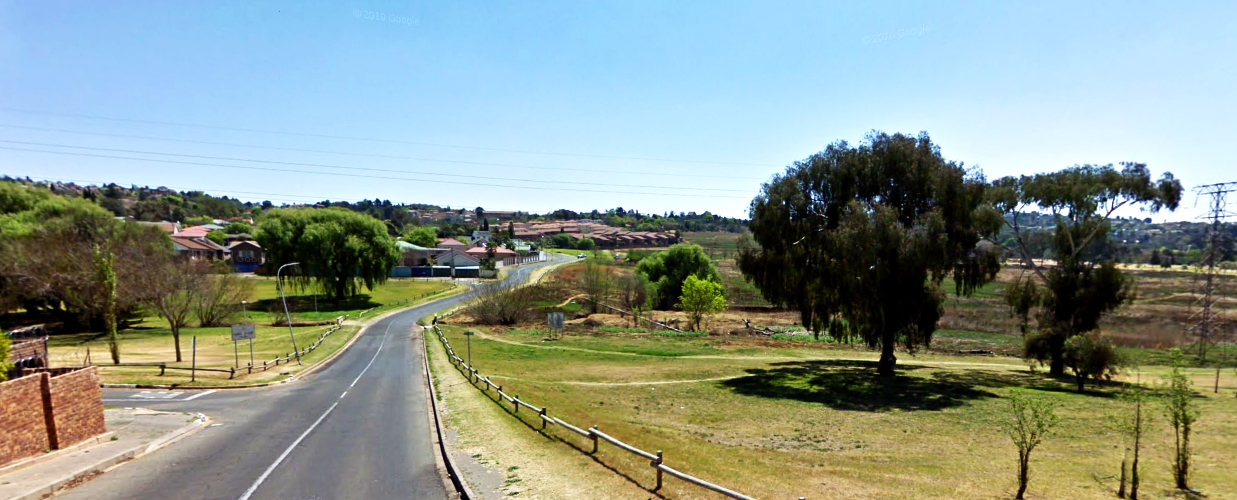
A street in Greymont, Johannesburg South Africa

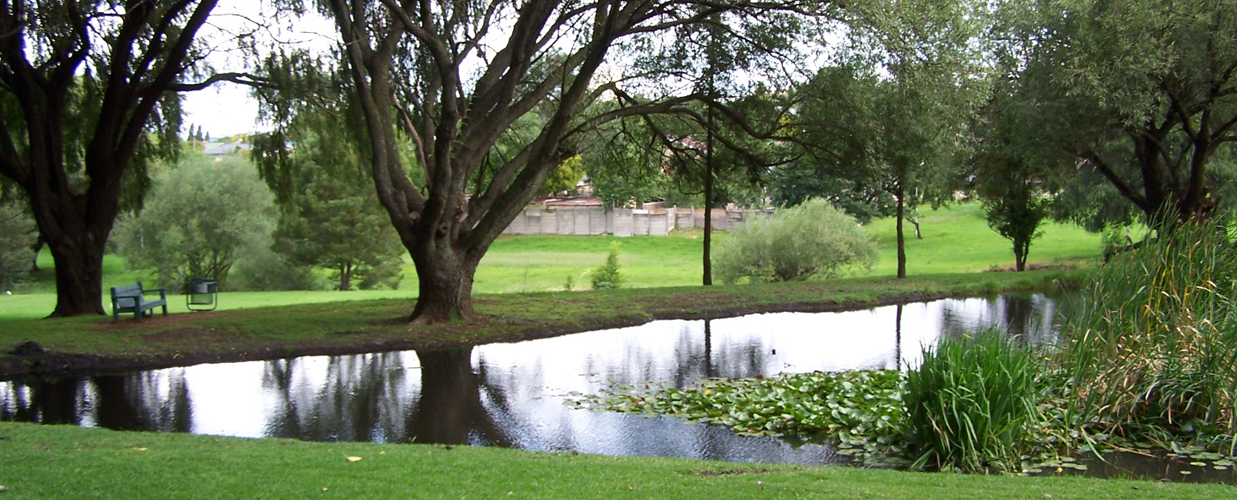
A pond in Carel Venter Park

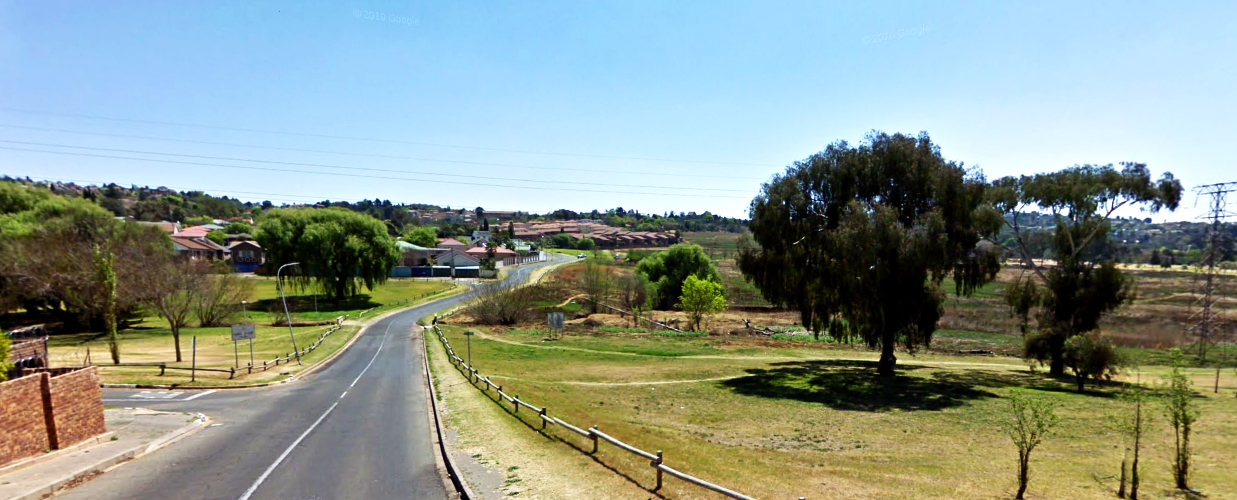
A street in Greymont, Johannesburg South Africa

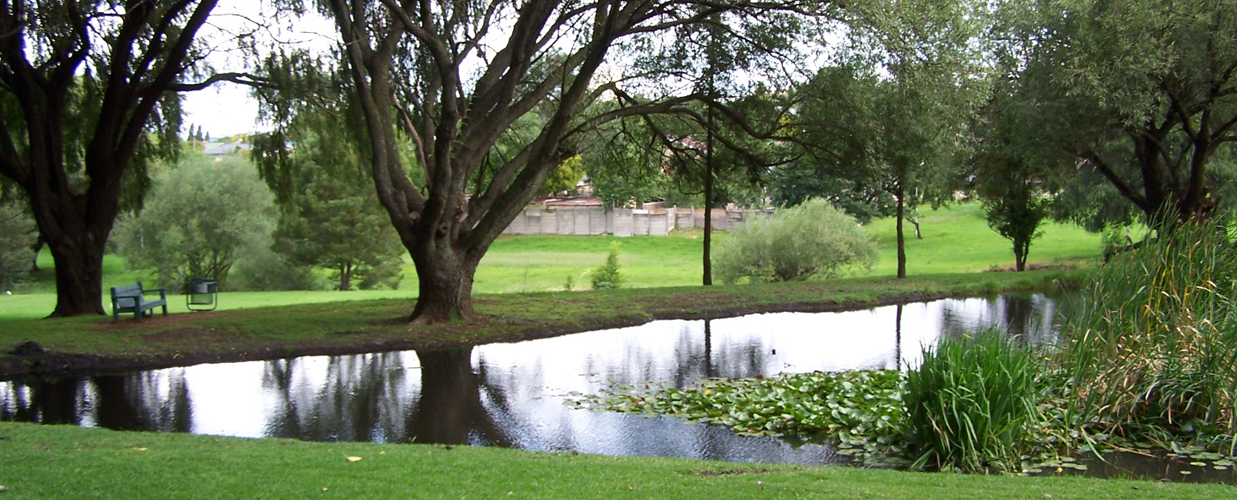
A pond in Carel Venter Park
