= Provincial routes (South Africa) =

Highway type in South Africa

Provincial Routes in South Africa
- Provincial route marker for R33

- Map of national routes and provincial routes in blue and green, respectively

Highway names
- National routes: Nxx
- Provincial routes: Rxx
- Metropolitan routes: Mxx

System links
- Numbered routes of South Africa

Provincial routes (also referred to as major regional routes) are the second category of road in the South African route-numbering scheme. They are designated with the letter "R" followed by a number from 21 to 82, formerly with the letter "P" followed by a number from 66. They serve as feeders to the national routes and as trunk roads in areas where there is no national route.

Designation as a provincial route does not necessarily imply that a road is maintained by the road authority in the provincial government; some parts of the provincial route network are maintained by the National Roads Agency (SANRAL), and parts in towns may be ordinary streets maintained by the municipal roads departments. Provincial routes vary in quality from gravel roads (for example the R31 between Askham and Hotazel) to freeways (for example the R59 between Vereeniging and Johannesburg).

== List of routes ==
No.	Route
R21	Boksburg – Kempton Park – Centurion – Pretoria
R22	Hluhluwe – Kosi Bay (– Ponta do Ouro, Mozambique)
R23	Volksrust – Standerton – Heidelberg (GP) – Brakpan – Benoni – Kempton Park
R24	Rustenburg – Krugersdorp – Roodepoort – Johannesburg – Bedfordview – Kempton Park
R25	Johannesburg – Kempton Park – Bapsfontein – Bronkhorstspruit – Groblersdal
R26	Rouxville – Ladybrand – Ficksburg – Bethlehem – Reitz – Frankfort – Villiers
R27	Southern section: Cape Town – Velddrif; Northern section: Vredendal – Calvinia – Keimoes
R28	Vereeniging – Sebokeng – Westonaria – Randfontein – Krugersdorp
R29	Johannesburg – Germiston – Boksburg – Benoni – Springs – Leandra – Kinross
R30	Bloemfontein – Welkom – Odendaalsrus – Bothaville – Orkney – Klerksdorp – Ventersdorp – Rustenburg
R31	(Keetmanshoop, Namibia –) Rietfontein – Kuruman – Kimberley
R33	Pietermaritzburg – Greytown – Dundee – Vryheid – eMkhondo – Carolina – eMakhazeni – Groblersdal – Marble Hall – Modimolle – Lephalale
R34	Vryburg – Schweizer-Reneke – Bloemhof – Hoopstad – Wesselsbron – Odendaalsrus – Kroonstad – Heilbron – Frankfort – Newcastle – Utrecht – Vryheid – Ulundi – Empangeni – Richards Bay
R35	Amersfoort – Bethal – Middelburg (MP)
R36	Ermelo – Carolina – Mashishing – Tzaneen – Louis Trichardt
R37	Polokwane – Mashishing – Mbombela
R38	Standerton – Bethal – Carolina – Barberton – Kaapmuiden
R39	Standerton – Ermelo
R40	(Piggs Peak, Eswatini –) Bulembu – Barberton – Mbombela – White River – Hoedspruit – Phalaborwa
R41	Randfontein – Roodepoort – Johannesburg
R42	Parys – Vanderbijlpark – Vereeniging – Heidelberg (GP) – Nigel – Delmas – Bronkhorstspruit
R43	Gansbaai – Hermanus – Worcester – Ceres
R44	Kleinmond – Strand – Somerset West – Stellenbosch – Wellington – Piketberg
R45	Saldanha – Vredenburg – Malmesbury – Wellington – Paarl – Villiersdorp
R46	Malmesbury – Ceres – Touws River
R48	De Aar – Petrusville - Petrusburg
R49	Mahikeng – Zeerust – Kopfontein (– Gaborone, Botswana)
R50	Standerton – Leandra – Delmas – Pretoria
R51	Villiers – Balfour – Nigel – Springs – Bapsfontein
R52	Vryburg – Lichtenburg – Rustenburg
R53	Parys – Potchefstroom – Ventersdorp – Swartruggens
R54	Potchefstroom – Vereeniging – Villiers
R55	Sandton – Pretoria
R56	Middelburg (EC) – Molteno – Elliot – Matatiele – Kokstad – Pietermaritzburg
R57	Phuthaditjhaba – Reitz – Heilbron – Sasolburg – Vanderbijlpark
R58	Colesberg – Burgersdorp – Aliwal North – Barkly East – Ngcobo
R59	Dealesville – Bothaville – Parys – Sasolburg – Vereeniging – Meyerton – Johannesburg
R60	Worcester – Robertson – Swellendam
R61	Beaufort West – Graaff-Reinet – Cradock – Queenstown – Mthatha – Port Edward – Margate – Port Shepstone
R62	Ashton – Oudtshoorn – Humansdorp
R63	Calvinia – Carnarvon – Graaff-Reinet – Fort Beaufort – King William's Town – Komga
R64	Kimberley – Boshof – Bloemfontein
R65	Ermelo – Sandlane (– Manzini, Eswatini)
R66	Gingindlovu – Eshowe – Ulundi – Nongoma – Pongola
R67	Port Alfred – Grahamstown – Fort Beaufort – Queenstown
R68	Dundee – Melmoth
R69	Vryheid – Mkuze
R70	Odendaalsrus – Hennenman – Senekal – Ficksburg
R71	Polokwane – Tzaneen – Namakgale – Phalaborwa
R72	Port Elizabeth – Port Alfred – East London
R73	Winburg – Virginia – Welkom
R74	Harrismith – Bergville – Greytown – KwaDukuza
R75	Port Elizabeth – Uitenhage – Graaff-Reinet
R76	Orkney – Kroonstad – Bethlehem
R80	Pretoria – Soshanguve
R81	Polokwane – Giyani – Thohoyandou
R82	Kroonstad – Vereeniging – Johannesburg

== Images ==
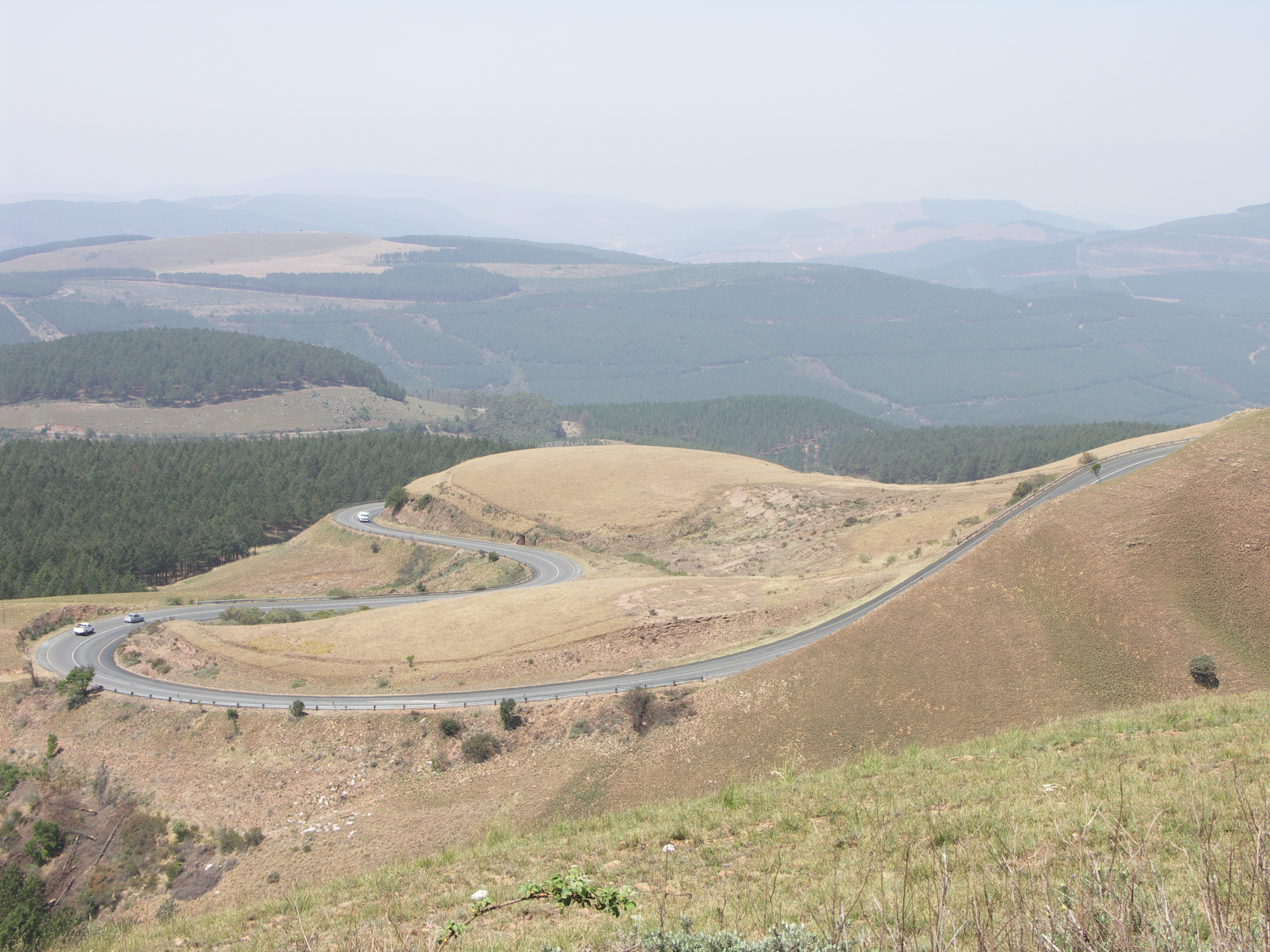
Long Tom Pass on the R37 in Mpumalanga

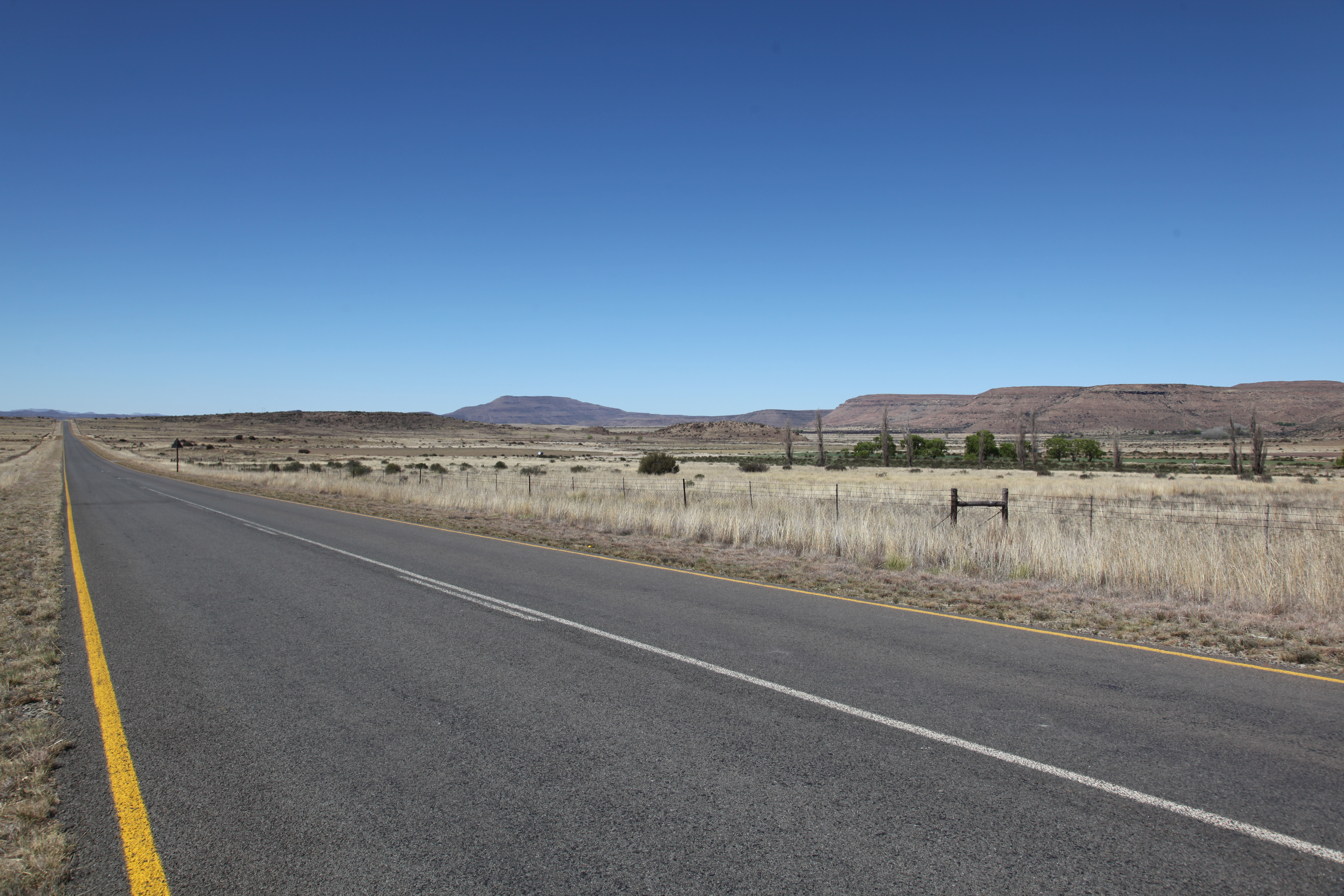
The R56 between Steynsburg and Molteno

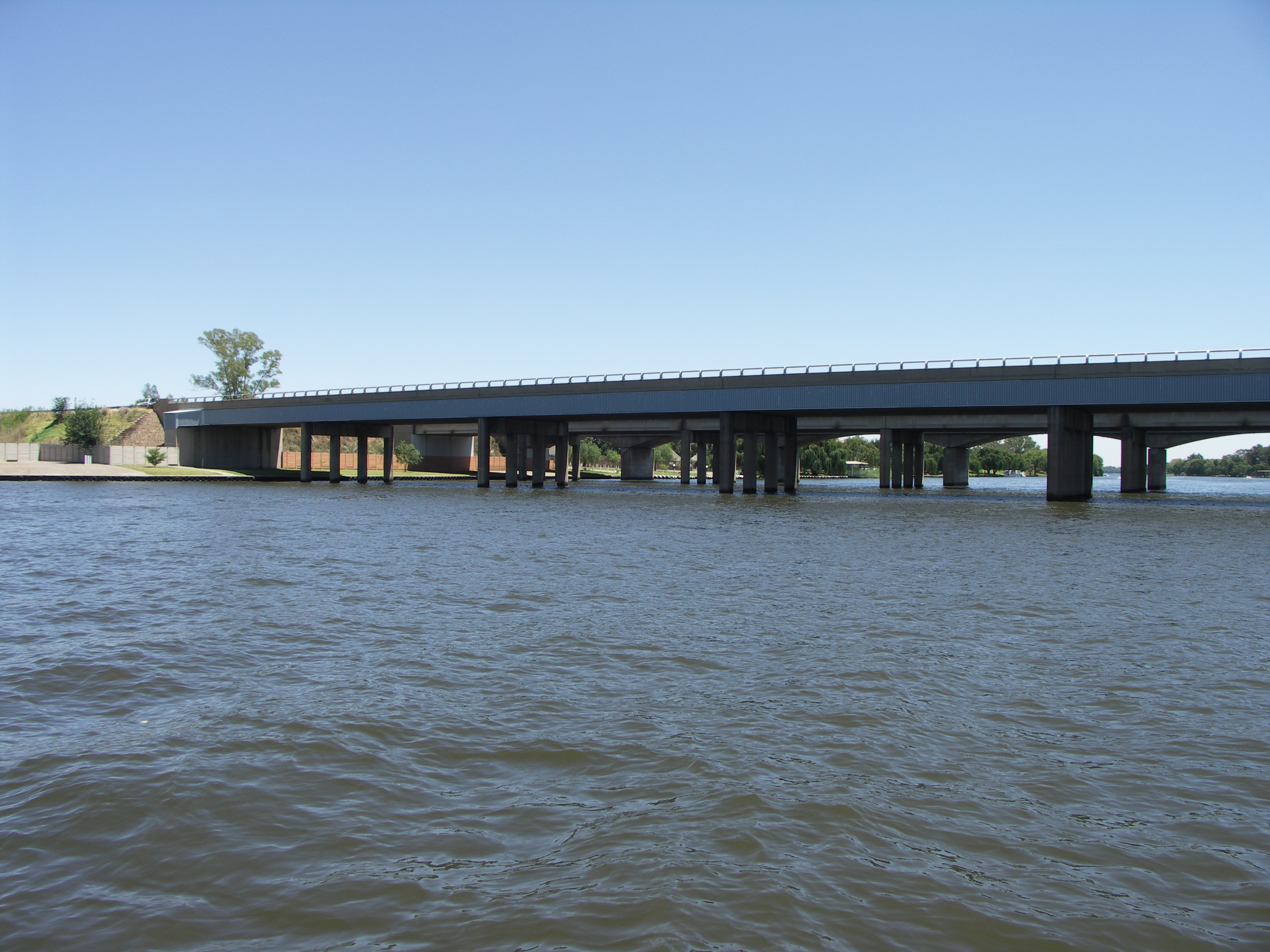
The R57 crossing the Vaal River near Vanderbijlpark

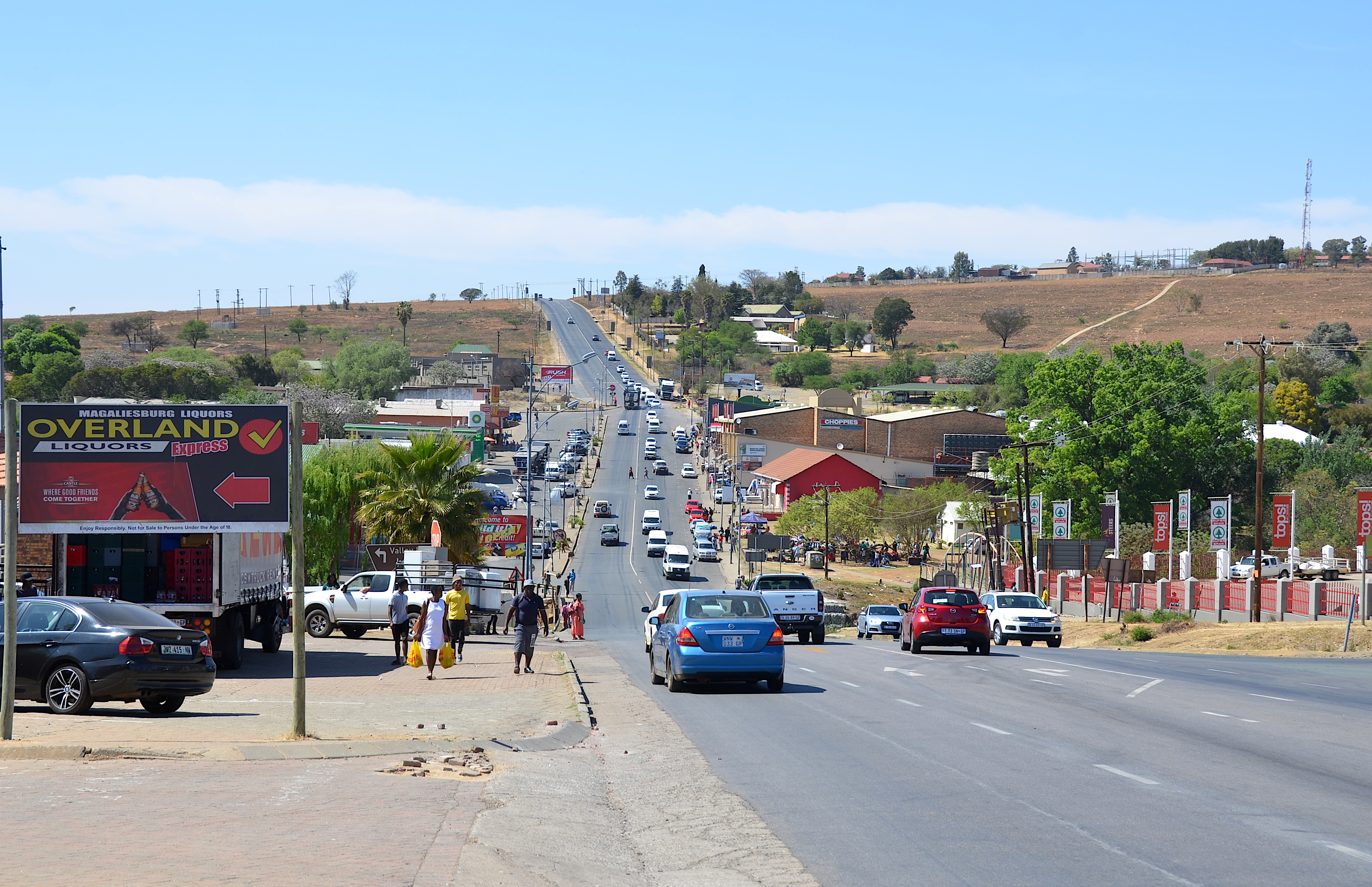
R24 through Magaliesburg

== See also ==
- National routes (South Africa)
- Regional routes (South Africa)
- Municipal Routes in Gauteng (disambiguation)
