= R69 =

R69 may refer to:

- (R)-69, a drug
- R69 (South Africa), a road
- BMW R69, a motorcycle
- HMS Ulysses (R69), a destroyer of the Royal Navy
- Small nucleolar RNA Z157/R69/R10
