= R67 =

R67 may refer to:

- R67 (South Africa), a road
- BMW R67, a motorcycle
- HMS Tyrian (R67), a destroyer of the Royal Navy
- R67: Vapours may cause drowsiness and dizziness, a risk phrase
