= R33 (South Africa) =

Road in South Africa

Provincial route R33

Route information
- Maintained by RAL, MDPWRT, SANRAL and KZNDT
- Length: 945 km (587 mi)

Major junctions
- North end: R510 in Lephalale
- N1 near Modimolle; N11 near Marble Hall; N11 / R25 in Groblersdal; N4 near Belfast; R36 / R38 in Carolina; N17 near Warburton; R65 in Amsterdam; N2 near Piet Retief; R34 / R69 in Vryheid; R34 at Blood River; R68 in Dundee; R74 in Greytown
- South end: N3 in Pietermaritzburg

Location
- Country: South Africa
- Major cities: Lephalale, Modimolle, Groblersdal, Belfast, Carolina, Amsterdam, Piet Retief, Paulpietersburg, Vryheid, Dundee, Greytown, Pietermaritzburg

Highway system
- Numbered routes of South Africa
← R31	→ R34

The R33 is a provincial route in South Africa that connects Pietermaritzburg with Lephalale via Greytown, Paulpietersburg, Carolina, Belfast and Vaalwater. It is a very long road, passing through 3 provinces (Limpopo, Mpumalanga and KwaZulu-Natal).

== Route ==
Detailed Route

=== Limpopo ===
The R33 begins south of Lephalale, at a junction with the R510 next to The Junction Restaurant & Golf Range. It starts by going eastwards to cross the Mokolo River. After crossing the Mokolo River, the R33 turns south-east and heads for 85 kilometres (53 mi), through the Grootwater Nature Reserve, to the town of Vaalwater, where it meets the eastern terminus of the R517.

The R33 becomes the road south-east from this junction. It continues south-east for 63 kilometres (39 mi) to the town of Modimolle (formerly known as Nylstroom), entering the vicinity as Nelson Mandela Drive. Just after the Modimolle Correctional Centre, the R33 reaches a 4-way junction with the R101 road (Thabo Mbeki Drive) and continues south-east for another 11 kilometres (6.8 mi) to meet the N1 toll highway (southbound access only) just north of its Kranskop Toll Plaza.

From the N1 junction, the R33 continues eastwards for 77 kilometres (48 mi), meeting the R516 route at a staggered junction, to reach a t-junction with the N11 national route from Mokopane. The R33 joins the N11 and they are cosigned as one road south-east for 16 kilometres (9.9 mi) into the town of Marble Hall, meeting the north-eastern terminus of the R573 road from Pretoria and KwaMhlanga. The R33 and the N11 remain cosigned as one road southwards for the next 26 kilometres (16 mi) up to the town of Groblersdal.

In Groblersdal, at the north-eastern terminus of the R25 road from Bronkhorstspruit (4-way junction; staggered junction), the R33 leaves the N11 national route and becomes the road eastwards, crossing the Olifants River. It continues east-south-east for 61 kilometres to the town of Stoffberg in Mpumalanga Province.

=== Mpumalanga ===
Into Mpumalanga, the R33 meets the southern terminus of the R579 road and continues to Stoffberg, where it meets the R555 road. They are cosigned southwards for 3 kilometres (1.9 mi) before they split, with the R33 continuing south-east. It travels for 39 kilometres (24 mi) to the town of Belfast (eMakhazeni), where it makes a left & right turn before meeting the southern terminus of the R540 road in the town centre.

Just after Belfast, the R33 meets the N4 highway (Maputo Corridor) and crosses it. Just after crossing the N4 highway, the R33 continues by a right turn and continues southwards for 46 kilometres (29 mi), bypassing the Nooitgedacht Dam and its Nature Reserve, to the town centre of Carolina, where it reaches a 4-way intersection with the R36 road and the R38 route. At this junction, the R38 stops cosigning with the R36 northwards and begins cosigning with the R33 eastwards. They are cosigned for one and a half kilometres (1 mi), before the R33 becomes its own road south-east at the Carolina Railway Station.

It continues for 37 kilometres (23 mi) to meet the N17 national route west of the town of Warburton. They are cosigned eastwards for 10 kilometres (6.2 mi), through the town of Warburton, before the R33 becomes its own road southwards. It continues for 52 kilometres (32 mi), bypassing the Westoe Dam, to the town of Amsterdam, where it reaches a 4-way junction with the R65 road. It continues southwards for 47 kilometres (29 mi) to the town of Piet Retief (eMkhondo).

12 kilometres (7.5 mi) before Piet Retief, the R33 route is joined by the N2 national route from Ermelo and they are cosigned southwards into Piet Retief. At the junction with Kruger Street, the R543 route from Wakkerstroom joins the N2/R33 cosignage southwards up to the 4th junction, where it becomes its own road eastwards to the border town of Mahamba, Eswatini.

The R33 route and the N2 national route remain cosigned for another three and a half kilometres (2.2 mi) southwards before the R33 becomes its own road southwards while the N2 turns to the east.

=== KwaZulu-Natal ===
From the N2 split in Piet Retief, the R33 continues southwards for 45 kilometres (28 mi), crossing the Pongola River into the KwaZulu-Natal Province, to the town of Paulpietersburg, where it makes a left and a right turn. From Paulpietersburg, it heads 48 kilometres southwards to meet the western terminus of the R69 route and the passing R34 route in the town of Vryheid.

West of Vryheid Central, the R33 meets the R34 at a 4-way junction and they become cosigned on the road leaving the city to the west-south-west. After 23 kilometres (14 mi), immediately after crossing the Blood River, the R34 route becomes its own road north-west, leaving the R33 as the west-south-westerly road. The R33 proceeds for 47 kilometres (29 mi) to the town of Dundee.

Five kilometres (3.1 mi) before Dundee, the R33 is joined by the R68 route and they are cosigned on the road into Dundee. At the Wilson Street junction in Dundee Central, the R33 becomes Wilson Street towards the south-east, becoming Commercial Road at the 2nd junction following. It continues south-south-east for 124 kilometres (77 mi), through Helpmekaar and Pomeroy, crossing the Tugela River at Tugela Ferry, to the town of Greytown, where it meets the R74 road at a t-junction.

The R33 cosigns with the R74 road westwards through Greytown for two kilometres (1.2 mi) before the R33 becomes its own road southwards. The R33 continues for 70 kilometres (43 mi), through New Hanover, bypassing the Albert Falls Town, Dam and Game Reserve, to enter the city of Pietermaritzburg, where it reaches its end at an intersection with the N3 national highway. The road on the other side of the N3 highway is the M70 metropolitan route towards Pietermaritzburg CBD.

== Gallery ==
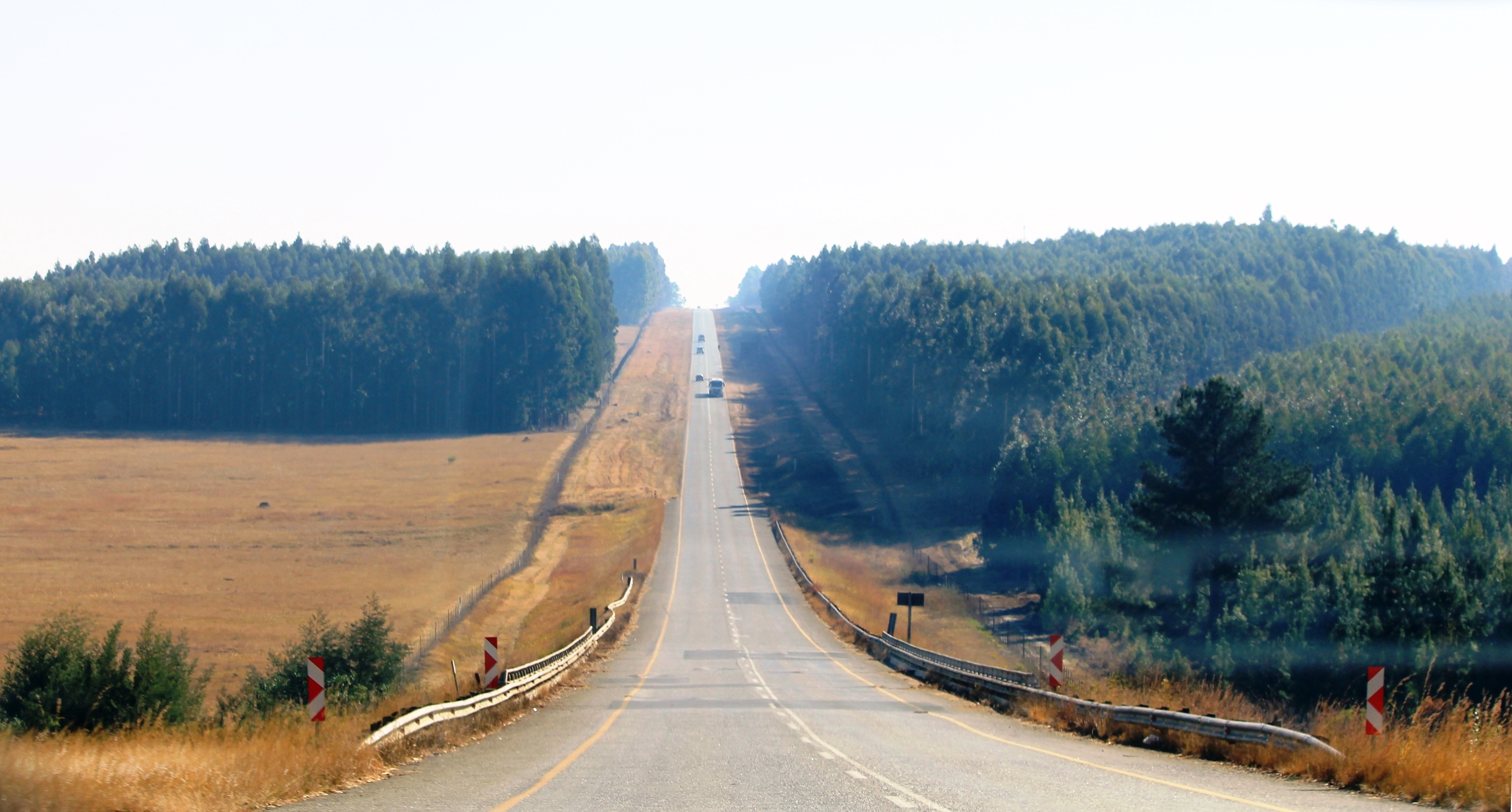
R33 near Piet Retief, Mpumalanga

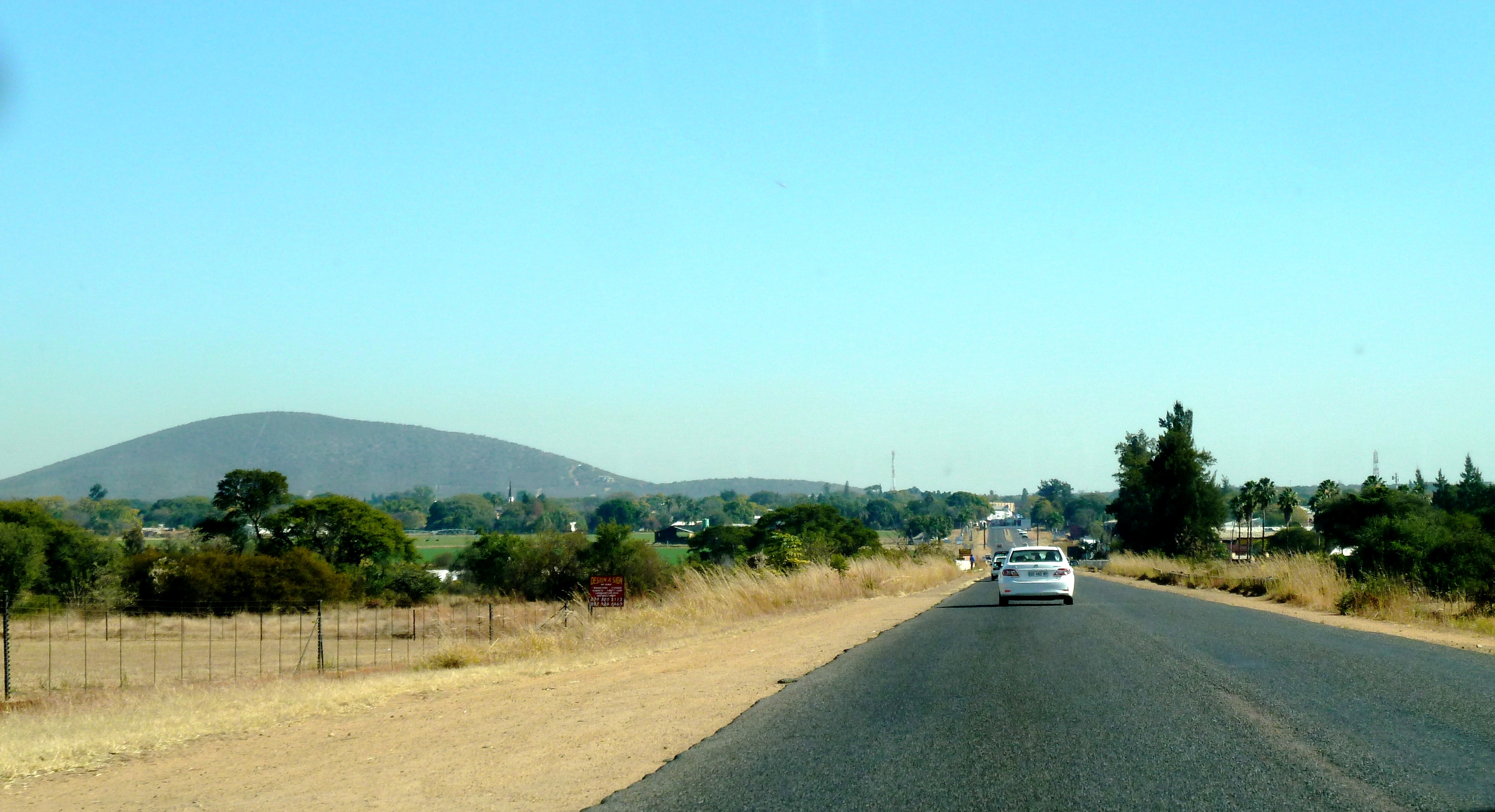
R33 near Groblersdal, Limpopo
