= R66 (South Africa) =

Provincial route in South Africa

Provincial route R66

Route information
- Maintained by KZNDT
- Length: 244 km (152 mi)

Major junctions
- South end: N2 near Gingindlovu
- R34 near Eshowe; R68 near Melmoth; R34 near Ulundi; R69 between Nongoma and Pongola
- North end: N2 in Pongola

Location
- Country: South Africa
- Major cities: Gingindlovu, Eshowe, Melmoth, Ulundi, Nongoma, Pongola

Highway system
- Numbered routes of South Africa
← R65	→ R67

The R66 is a provincial route in KwaZulu-Natal, South Africa that connects Gingindlovu with Pongola via Eshowe, Melmoth and Ulundi. It starts and ends at a junction with the N2.

== Route ==
Detailed Route

The R66 begins in Pongola, at a junction with the N2 national route. It begins by going southwards for 19 kilometres, crossing the Pongola River, to reach a junction with the R69 route near a place named Magudu. The R69 joins the R66 and they are one road southwards for 2 kilometres before the R69 becomes its own road westwards while the R66 remains as the southerly road.

The R66 continues southwards for 40 kilometres, passing by the Mkuze Game Reserve (where it crosses the Mkuze River), crossing the Nkunzane River, to reach a T-junction with the R618 route at Nhlopenkulu. The R66 joins the R618 and they form one road south-east for 6 kilometres into the town of Nongoma before splitting adjacent to the Nongoma Police Station, where the R66 becomes its own road southwards.

The R66 continues southwards for 74 kilometres as the King Dinizulu Highway, crossing the Black Umfolozi River, passing through the city of Ulundi and crossing the White Umfolozi River, to reach a T-junction with the R34 route. The R66 joins the R34 and they are one road southwards, heading for 22 kilometres to meet the eastern terminus of the R68 route just east of the Melmoth town centre. The R34 and the R66 remain as one road southwards for another 31 kilometres before they split at a junction, where the R34 becomes its own road eastwards while the R66 remains as the southerly road.

The R66 continues southwards for 43 kilometres, passing through Eshowe (east of the town centre), to reach a junction with the R102 route at Gingindlovu. The R102 joins the R66 and they form one road southwards for a few metres before the R102 becomes its own road westwards. The R66 heads southwards for another 6 kilometres to reach its end at another junction with the N2 national route.
