= R68 =

R68 may refer to:

- R68 (New York City Subway car)
- R68 (South Africa), a road
- BMW R68, a motorcycle
- HMS Crispin (R68), a destroyer of the Royal Navy
- HMS Ocean (R68), an aircraft carrier of the Royal Navy
- R68: Possible risk of irreversible effects, a risk phrase
