= R34 (South Africa) =

Road in South Africa

Provincial route R34

Route information
- Maintained by NWDPWRT, FSDPRT, SANRAL and KZNDT
- Length: 977 km (607 mi)

Major junctions
- Northwest end: N14 near Vryburg
- N12 in Bloemhof; R59 in Hoopstad; R30 in Odendaalsrus; R70 in Odendaalsrus; N1 south of Kroonstad; R76 in Kroonstad; N1 north of Kroonstad; R82 near Kroonstad; R57 in Heilbron; R26 near Frankfort; N3 near Frankfort; N11 near Newcastle; R33 at Blood River; R33 / R69 in Vryheid; R66 near Ulundi; R68 near Melmoth; R66 near Eshowe; N2 near Empangeni
- Southeast end: John Ross Parkway in Richards Bay

Location
- Country: South Africa
- Major cities: Vryburg, Schweizer-Reneke, Bloemhof, Wesselsbron, Odendaalsrus, Kroonstad, Heilbron, Frankfort, Vrede, Newcastle, Utrecht, Vryheid, Ulundi, Melmoth, Empangeni, Richards Bay

Highway system
- Numbered routes of South Africa
| ← R33 | → R35 |

The R34 is a long provincial route in South Africa that connects Vryburg with Richards Bay via Kroonstad and Newcastle. It passes through three provinces, North West, the Free State and KwaZulu-Natal.

== Route ==
Detailed Route

=== North West ===
The R34 begins a few kilometres east of the town of Vryburg, North West at a t-junction with the N14 national route, which is the main road into the town. The R34 starts by going south-east for 60 kilometres (37 mi) to the town of Schweizer-Reneke. In the town centre, it meets the R506 road and the R504 route at a 4-way junction with Schweizer Street. The R506 joins the R34 to be co-signed southwards. They are one road for two and a half kilometres (1.6 mi), crossing the Harts River before the R506 becomes its own road south-west.

Leaving Schweizer-Reneke, the R34 continues south-east for 55 kilometres to the town of Bloemhof, where it reaches a t-junction with the N12 national route (Prince Street). The R34 joins the N12 eastwards for two kilometres (1.2 mi) before becoming its own road eastwards while the N12 turns to the north-east. The R34 enters the Bloemhof Nature Reserve and proceeds to cross the Vaal River adjacent to the Bloemhof Dam into the Free State Province.

=== Free State ===
As it enters the province, the R34 resumes in a south-easterly direction for 30 kilometres (19 mi), through the Sandveld Nature Reserve, to enter the small town of Hoopstad, where it meets the R59 road (Van Zyl Road) just north of the R59's Vet River crossing. The R34 & R59 cosignage loops to the north of Hoopstad and turns eastwards before the R59 becomes its own road to the north-east just north of the Tikwana Suburb, leaving the R34 as the easterly road.

From Hoopstad, the R34 continues for 40 kilometres (25 mi) to bypass the town of Wesselsbron to the south and meet the R719 road at a 4-way-junction south-east of the town. It continues in an easterly direction for 30 kilometres (19 mi) to meet the R30 road on the southerly outskirts of the town of Odendaalsrus (10 kilometres (6.2 mi) north of Welkom). They are cosigned northwards up to the next junction, where the R34 becomes its own road eastwards to pass through the Ross Kent South suburb. At the 3rd junction afterwards, at the north-western terminus of the R70 road (Church Street), the R34 turns to the north-west and at the next roundabout with Van Der Vyver Street, the R34 turns northwards to become Voortrekker Avenue and separate Odendaalsrus Central from the Ross Kent East suburb. At the next roundabout, the R34 turns eastwards to become Althea Road.

It heads eastwards for nine kilometres (5.6 mi) to meet the northern terminus of the R730 road at a t-junction. The R34 continues as the road east-north-east from this junction and continues for 47 kilometres (29 mi), meeting the eastern terminus of the R713 road, to meet the N1 national route south of Kroonstad.

At the R730 junction, the R34 takes over being the ZR Mahabane Toll Highway maintained by SANRAL from the R730 (forms the last section of the toll route) and remains with the status up to the N1 in Kroonstad. Although there are no tollgates at the moment, the entire 47-kilometre-stretch (29 mi) of the R34 from the R730 junction to the N1 interchange is declared a toll road (labelled on road signage).

At the N1 interchange, the R34 joins the N1 freeway northwards (concurrent) for eight kilometres (5 mi), meeting the R76 road just after the interchange, crossing the Vals River, bypassing Kroonstad Central to the east, up to the R721 road off-ramp, where the R721 is the road westwards and the R34 becomes the road eastwards. There is only one off-ramp in between the R76 and R721 off-ramps, at Reitz Road east of Kroonstad Central.

Just after the N1 & R721 interchange, the R34 meets the southern terminus of the R82 road and continues eastwards for 42 kilometres (26 mi) to the town of Edenville, where it meets the R720 road and turns north-east. The R34 & R720 are one road north-east for eight kilometres (5 mi) before the R720 becomes its own road to the north-west towards Koppies.

The R34 continues for another 42 kilometres (26 mi), crossing the Renoster River, to reach the town of Heilbron. Just south-west of the Heilbron town centre, the R34 meets the R57 road and they become co-signed eastwards for three kilometres (2 mi), meeting the southern terminus of the R723 route and the northern terminus of the R725 route, before the R57 becomes its own road southwards while the R34 continues eastwards.

From Heilbron, the R34 continues eastwards for 50 kilometres (31 mi), meeting the northern terminus of the R707 road, to the town of Frankfort. Just before entering Frankfort, the R26 route from Tweeling joins it and the two routes enter Frankfort, crossing the Wilge River, as one road. After bypassing the town to the south-east, the R26 becomes its own road to the north-east and the R34 turns to the east-south-east, continuing for 26 kilometres (16 mi) to meet the N3 national route. It continues for another 13 kilometres (8.1 mi) eastwards to reach a t-junction with the R103 road south of Cornelia.

The R34 and the R103 are cosigned southwards for 15 kilometres (9.3 mi) before the R34 becomes its own road eastwards. It continues for 13 kilometres to the town of Vrede. In Vrede, at the southern terminus of the R546 road, the R34 turns to bypass the town centre to the south and meet the western terminus of the R543 road south of the town centre. It continues south-east for 52 kilometres (32 mi) to the town of Memel, where it meets the northern terminus of the R722 road. It continues east to cross the provincial border into KwaZulu-Natal.

=== KwaZulu-Natal ===
From Memel, the R34 continues for 48 kilometres (30 mi) to the town of Newcastle, entering the town from the north-west and reaching a t-junction with Allen Street north of the Newcastle Central Business District. The R34 becomes the road north-east from this intersection up to its junction with the N11 national route. It joins the N11 for seven kilometres (4.3 mi) northwards before the R34 becomes its own road eastwards, crossing the Buffalo River. It continues for 35 kilometres (22 mi) to the town of Utrecht, entering the town from the north. It leaves the town in a south-easterly direction and continues for 40 kilometres (25 mi) to reach an intersection with the R33 road.

From this junction, the R33 and the R34 are cosigned as one road north-east, immediately crossing the Blood River, into the town of Vryheid. West of Vryheid at a 4-way junction, The R33 becomes the road to the north and the R34 becomes the road southwards, forming a semi-ring road around Vryheid. Midway along the semi-ring road, the R34 meets the western terminus of the R69 route (which completes the road around Vryheid) and the R34 turns southwards.

The R34 continues southwards for 100 kilometres (62 mi), crossing the White Umfolozi River and the Mpembeni River, to meet the R66 route (King Dinizulu Highway) south-west of Ulundi. They are cosigned southwards for 53 kilometres (33 mi), meeting the eastern end of the R68 road in the town of Melmoth, before the R34 becomes its own road eastwards near the Goedertrouw Dam.

After 40 kilometres (25 mi), it enters Empangeni as Nkwanazi Street from the north-west and passes through the town to reach a major intersection with the R102 road (Grantham Highway) in the southern outskirts. It leaves Empangeni as the John Ross Parkway eastwards and after a brief distance intersects and crosses the N2 freeway and continues east to Richards Bay, where it meets the southern terminus of the R619 road. It proceeds eastwards to end just north of the Alkantstrand Beach.
