= R618 road =

R618 road may refer to:

- R618 road (Ireland)
- R618 (South Africa)
