= Nerston border post =

Border crossing between South Africa and Eswatini

Nerston on the R65 road in Mpumalanga is a border post between South Africa and Eswatini. The Eswatini side of the border is known as Sandlane, and the road leading into Eswatini is the MR19. The border is open between 08:00 and 18:00

	South Africa	Eswatini
Region	Mpumalanga	
Nearest town	Amsterdam	
Road	R65	MR19
GPS Coordinates	26.5697°S 30.7914°E	26.5697°S 30.7914°E
Telephone number	+27 (0) 17 846 9207	
Fax number	+27 (0) 17 846 9602	
Business hours	08:00 - 18:00	08:00 - 18:00
