= R619 road =

R619 road may refer to:

- R619 road (Ireland)
- R619 (South Africa)
