= R65 (South Africa) =

Provincial route in South Africa

Provincial route R65

Route information
- Maintained by MDPWRT
- Length: 90.3 km (56.1 mi)

Major junctions
- West end: N17 near Ermelo
- R33 in Amsterdam
- East end: MR19 on the Swaziland border at Sandlane

Location
- Country: South Africa
- Major cities: Ermelo, Amsterdam

Highway system
- Numbered routes of South Africa
← R64	→ R66

The R65 is a provincial route in Mpumalanga, South Africa that connects Ermelo with the Eswatini border at Nerston (Sandlane) via Amsterdam.

== Route ==
Detailed Route

The R65 begins just north-east of the Ermelo town centre, at a junction with the N17 national route. It heads eastwards from the N17 junction for 73 kilometres to reach a junction with the R33 route in the town of Amsterdam. The R65 continues east-north-east for 17 kilometres to reach the Nerston Border Post, where it crosses into Eswatini and becomes the MR19 route. The border on the Eswatini side is named Sandlane.
