= Fonteinkloof Pass =

Landmark in South Africa

Coordinates: 33°35′40.9″S 26°07′20.6″E

Fonteinkloof Pass (English: Fountain Gap) is situated in the Eastern Cape, province of South Africa, on the regional road R72, between Port Elizabeth and Alexandria, Eastern Cape.
