= R72 (South Africa) =

Provincial route in South Africa

Provincial route R72

Route information
- Maintained by ECDRPW
- Length: 243 km (151 mi)

Major junctions
- West end: N2 / N10 near Coega
- R67 in Port Alfred
- East end: N2 / N6 in East London

Location
- Country: South Africa
- Major cities: Alexandria; Kenton-on-Sea; Port Alfred; East London

Highway system
- Numbered routes of South Africa
← R71	→ R73

The R72 is a provincial route in Eastern Cape, South Africa that connects the N2 north-east of Gqeberha with East London via Port Alfred. It provides an alternative to the N2 for travel between Gqeberha and East London.

== Route ==
Detailed Route

The R72 begins in the city of East London in the Buffalo City Metropolitan Municipality, at an off-ramp junction with the N2 highway. North of this junction, it is the N6 national route to Bloemfontein.

The R72 begins by going southwards for 6 kilometres from the N2 interchange as the North East Expressway, immediately crossing the Nahoon River and becoming a partial highway with off-ramp junctions, up to the Fleet Street junction in the suburb of Quigney, where it becomes Fleet Street westwards. It goes westwards for 9 kilometres, through East London's Central Business District, crossing the Buffalo River, to become Settlers Way and reach the East London Airport entrance.

From the East London Airport, the R72 follows the Eastern Cape Coast westwards for 127 km, meeting the southern terminus of the R346 road and bypassing the East London Coast Nature Reserve, bypassing Kidd's Beach, bypassing the Great Fish River's mouth, to the town of Port Alfred, where it meets the southern terminus of the R67 road before passing through the town centre.

It crosses the Kowie River in the town centre before leaving Port Alfred westwards and continuing for 22 kilometres to the town of Kenton-on-Sea, where it crosses the Kariega River near its mouth and meets the southern terminus of the R343 road. It then crosses the Boesmans River near its mouth and passes through Boesmansriviermond before turning away from the coast and continuing westwards for 23 kilometres to the town of Alexandria.

From Alexandria, the R72 continues westwards for 50 kilometres as the Fonteinkloof Pass to reach its western terminus, where it forms another interchange with the N2 highway about 45 kilometres north-east of Gqeberha (35 kilometres north-east of Coega; 12 kilometres north-east of Colchester). It meets the southern terminus of the N10 national route at the same interchange.
