= BMW R60/2 =

R60/2
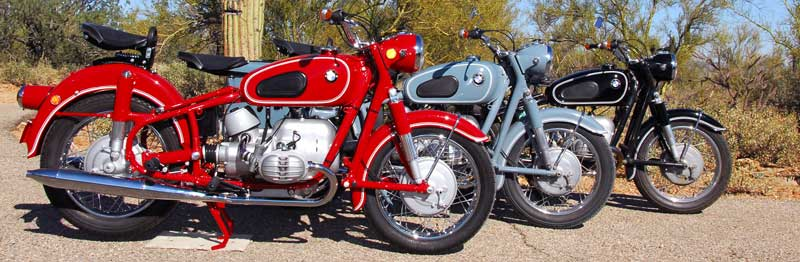
- Granada red R60/2 • Dominican blue R50/2 • Standard black R60/2
- Manufacturer: BMW
- Production: 1956 to 1969
- Assembly: Munich, Germany
- Bore / stroke: 72 mm × 73 mm
- Compression ratio: 7.5 : 1
- Top speed: 90 mph
- Power: 30 hp
- Ignition type: Magneto
- Frame type: Twin-loop steel tubular
- Suspension: Long swinging arm with strut and oil-pressure shock absorbers
- Brakes: drum brake, Ø 200 mm
- Tires: 3.50 x 18
- Dimensions: L: 84"; W: 26"; H: 39"
- Weight: 430 lb (wet)
- Fuel capacity: 17 L
- Fuel consumption: 47.0 MPG

The R60 and R60/2 are 600 cc boxer-twin that were manufactured from 1956 to 1969 in Munich, Germany, by BMW.

== Production history ==
Some 20,133 of these 600 cc shaft-drive, opposed twin R60 (1956–1960, 28 hp or 21 kW), R60/2 (1960–1969, 30 hp or 22 kW), and R60US (1968–1969, 30 hp) were built. These models, except for those with the "US" designation, were designed primarily as rugged motorcycles to pull sidecars (mounting points were built in) and had duplex tubular steel frames.

Simultaneously manufactured were related models, including the 500 cc R50 (1955–1960, 26 hp or 19 kW), the R50/2 (1960–1969, 26 hp), the R50 S (1960–1962, 35 hp or 26 kW), the R50US (1968–1969, 26 hp), and the 600 cc sport-oriented R69 (1955–1960, 35 hp), R69S (1960–1969, 42 hp or 31 kW), and R69US (1968–1969, 42 hp).

In the United States, all these Earles-fork and US-fork (i.e., telescopic fork) models from 1955 to 1969 are often lumped together as "Slash-2" BMWs, even though that is technically incorrect. Not all of them, as seen above, have the "/2" designation.

Perhaps the most famous BMW rider of the 1960s was Danny Liska, who took R60 models from Alaska to Tierra del Fuego in one trip, and from Europe's North Cape to South Africa's Cape of Good Hope in a second journey. His book about the first trip, Two Wheels to Adventure (Alaska to Argentina by Motorcycle), was published in 1989 with a second edition published in 2004. In the book "Zen and the Art of Motorcycle Maintenance", John and Sylvia Sutherland accompany Robert Pirsig, the author, and his son Chris, on a 1968 road trip from Minnesota to San Francisco, riding a BMW R60. Throughout the book Pirsig contrasts his passion and care in taking care of his bike to John's fear of technology: "The BMW is famous for not giving mechanical problems on the road and that's what he is counting on."

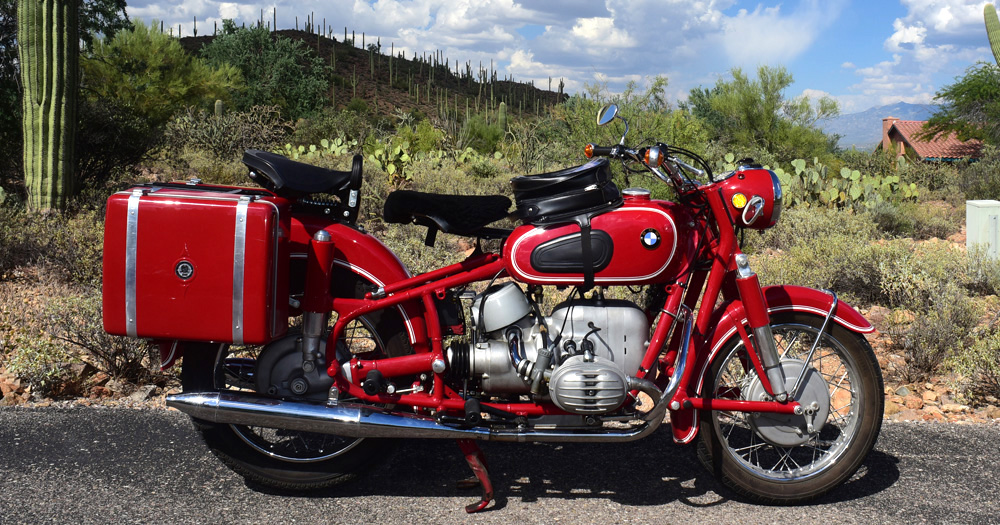
Granada red 1967 BMW R60/2

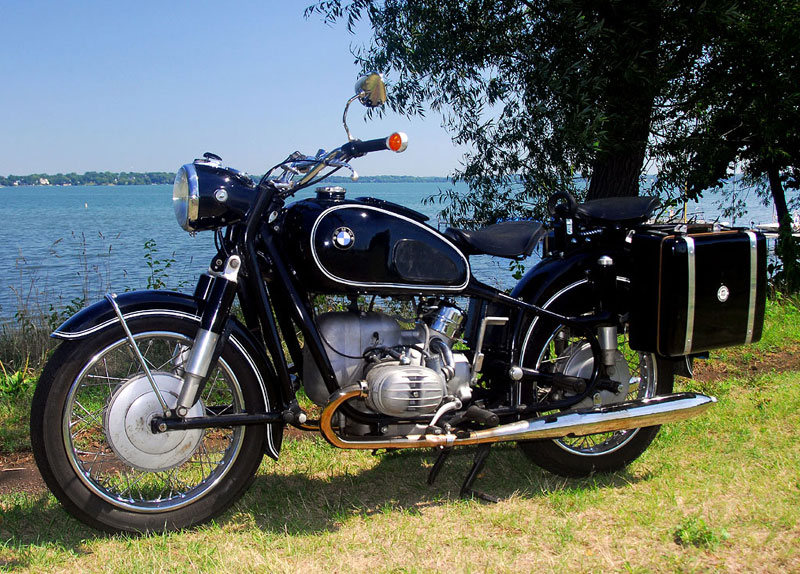
1967 BMW R60/2 with 6½ gallon tank and Craven Golden Arrow panniers

Though BMW first used oil-damped telescopic front forks in the 1930s, it chose to use Earles forks on these models. The triangular front Earles fork, named after its designer, Englishman Ernest Earles, precluded any front-end dive during heavy front braking, which is common with telescopic front forks. It also worked well in sidecar duty. Though heavy and ponderous in turning, the Earles fork gave the old Beemer a steady and reassuring ride.

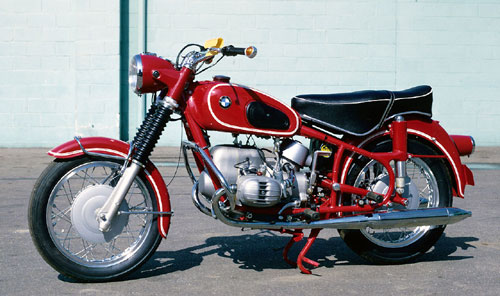
Original 1968 photo of a brand-new BMW R60US with telescopic forks and standard dual saddle

In 1968, BMW introduced telescopic forks on some of its slash-2 models, and they were continued into the 1969 model year. Modified, they became the front forks on the slash-5 models introduced for the 1970 model year. The photo of the red R60US to the right was taken at a BMW dealership in 1968 and shows a brand-new motorcycle waiting for its first buyer. Earles fork and telescopic fork models both were manufactured for these two years and were available to customers.

During the 1960s, very few motorcycles were available with shaft final drive. BMW's were the most common. The driveshaft rode in an enclosed oil bath within the right swingarm, unlike BMW's previous models, and drove the rear wheel through an internally splined cup that meshes with a coupler crown gear keyed to the drive pinion. This meant that leaking seals could become a problem for the owners. Because the clutch was dry, there were seals at the rear of the crankshaft, at both ends of the transmission, at the rear of the driveshaft, and at the front and rear of the rear drive unit: many seals developed leaks.

The front brakes were double leading shoes, and the rear had a single leading shoe. By modern standards, they were not good brakes. Tires, front and rear, were interchangeable in 3.50 inch by 18 inch size.

Motorcycles sold in America had high handlebars with a cross brace. Those sold elsewhere came with low, Euro handlebars.

A variety of saddle styles were available for these motorcycles. Those delivered in the U. S. typically were supplied with a single "dual" or bench saddle, either the standard size or a wide version that came with chrome rear-quarter passenger handles. Alternatives available included a Denfeld (not "Denfield") or Pagusa solo driver's saddle, or individual driver and passenger saddles.

== Accessories ==
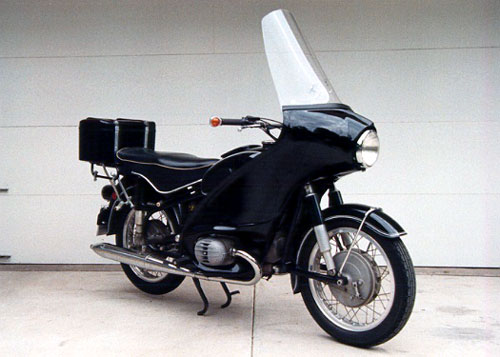
R60/2 with Avon full fairing and Craven top case

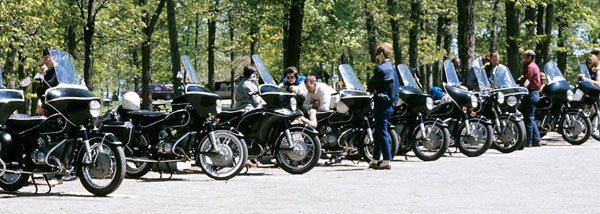
The Madison (WI) BMW club in 1970, with many Wixom fairings

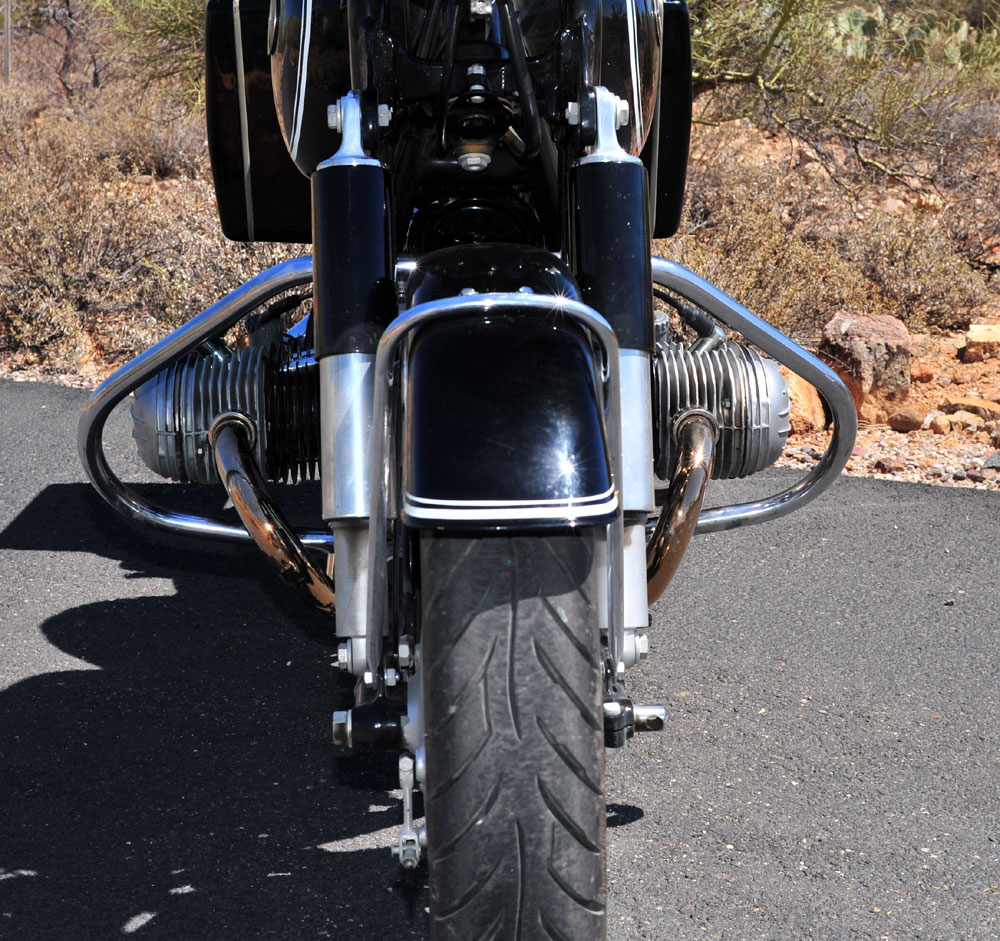
Safety bar installed on a 1967 BMW R60/2

BMW motorcycles of the 1960s were noted as long-distance touring motorcycles. However, none came standard with fairings or luggage; these items were provided by aftermarket vendors. Fairings included the Wixom Ranger handlebar-mounted fairing made in Illinois, and Avon. There were numerous manufacturers of saddle bags and top cases for BMW twins in the 1960s including Wixom, British-made Craven, and leather saddlebags imported by Butler and Smith, who also offered several styles of luggage carriers for mounting behinds the passenger saddle. It also offered several styles of windshields, safety bars, a spotlight, metric tool kits, and a mechanical tachometer.

U.S. motorcycles came standard with a narrow dual saddle, though wide dual saddles with chrome rear handles could be ordered. Solo saddles made by Pagusa or Denfeld for driver and passenger were also available. All motorcycles came with a tool kit. Hella turn signals were optional (photo below left), and were mounted at the ends of the handlebars showing light both forward and back.

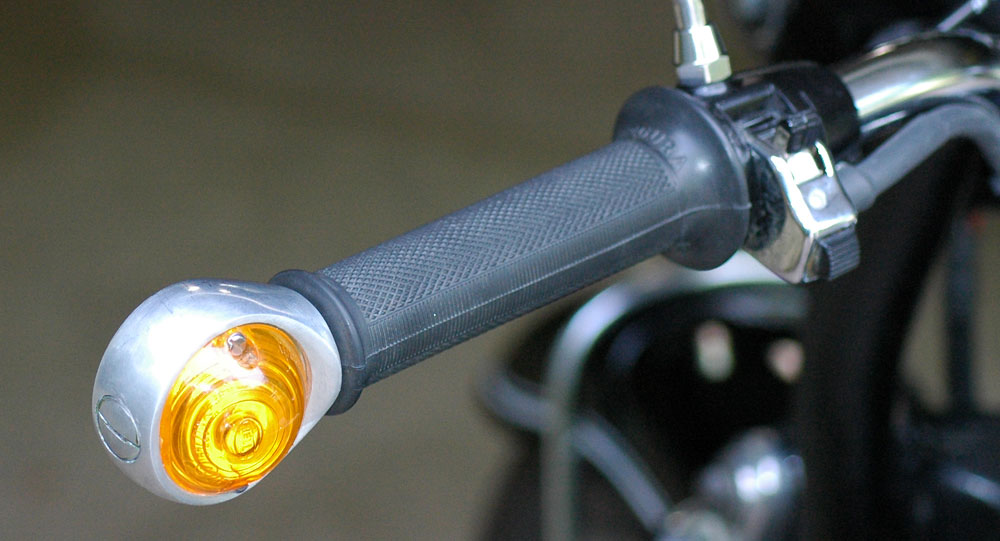
Hella bar-end turn signal

The standard fuel tank held 17 L (3.7 imp gal; 4.5 US gal), though a commonly purchased option was a more bulbous 25 L (5.5 imp gal; 6.6 US gal) tank. Also available as options were sport tanks of 26 L (5.7 imp gal; 6.9 US gal) and 30 L (6.6 imp gal; 7.9 US gal) capacities.

An oval shaped safety bar (photo right) was available for all 1955–69 BMW motorcycles from the American importer, Butler and Smith, New York.

== Specifications ==
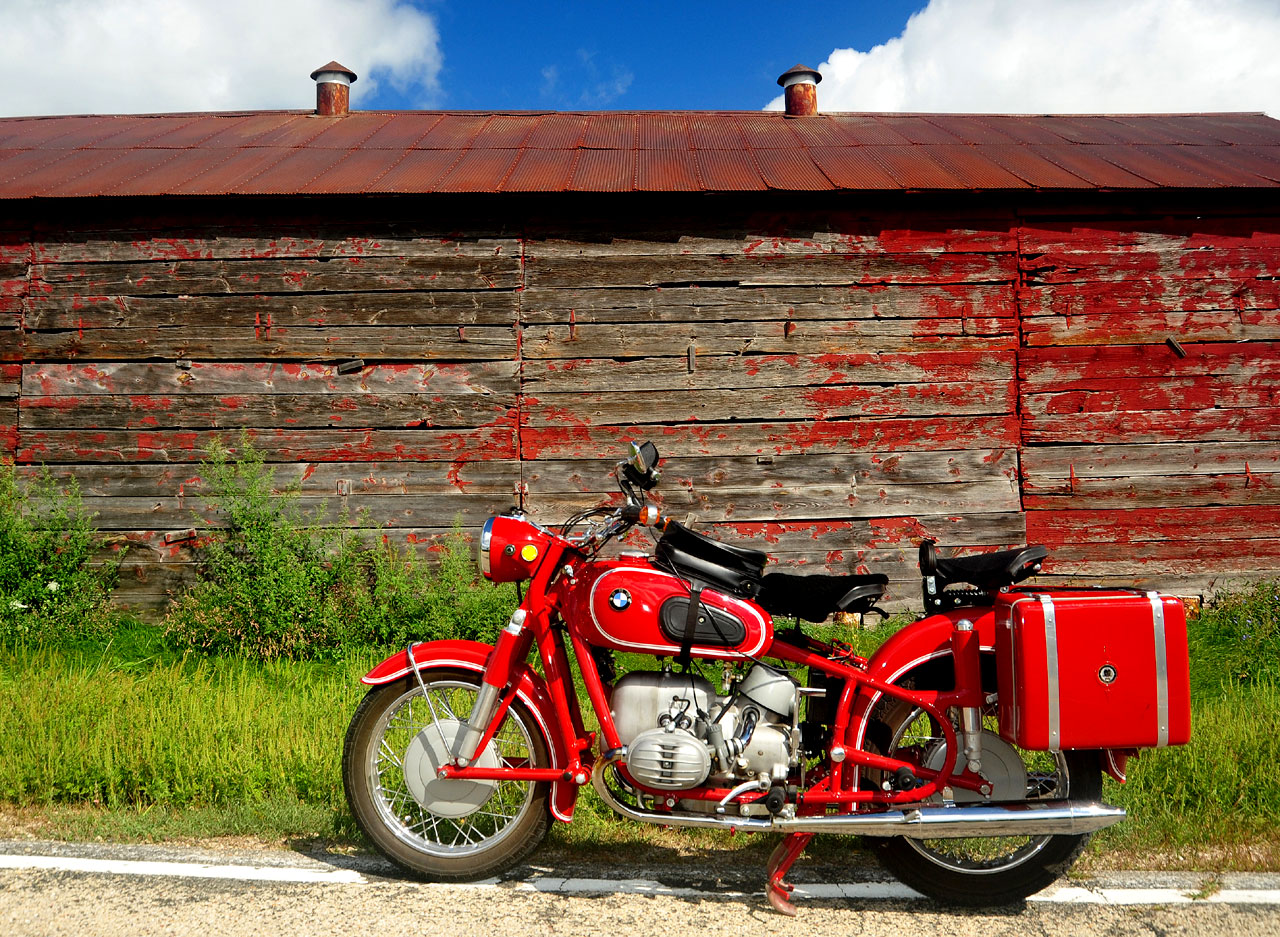
1967 BMW R60/2 in Granada red with Craven panniers

Engine Numbers

- 1955–1960 R50 Engine Numbers: 550 001 – 563 515
- 1960–1969 R50/2 & R50US Engine Numbers: 630 001 – 649 037
- 1956–1960 R60 Engine Numbers: 618 001 — 621 530
- 1960–1966 R60/2 Engine Numbers: 622 001 — 629 999
- 1966–1969 R60/2 & R60US Engine Numbers: 1 810 001 — 1 819 307

Engine

- Internal designation 267 / 5
- Type four-stroke, two-cylinder, air-cooled boxer
- Bore/stroke 72 mm × 73 mm (2.8 in × 2.9 in)
- Cubic capacity 594 cc (36.2 cu in)
- Maximum power 30 hp (22 kW) at 5,800 rpm
- Compression ratio 7.5 : 1
- Valves per cylinder 2
- Carburation system 2 Bing 1/24/125-126 od. 1/24/133-134 od. 1/24/151-152
- Engine lubrication forced-feed lubrication
- Oil pump gear pump

Power Transmission

- Clutch single disc saucer spring, dry
- Number of gears 4
- Shifting foot shifting
- Gear ratios 4.7 / 2.73 / 1.94 / 1.54 (with sidecar: 5.33 / 3.02 / 2.04 / 1.54)
- Rear wheel ratio 1 : 3.13 or 1:3.38 (with sidecar 1 : 3.86)
- Bevel/crown wheel 18 / 27 or 8 / 25 teeth (with sidecar 7 / 27)

Electrical System

- Alternator Bosch LJ/CGE 60/6/1700 R
- Ignition magneto ignition
- Spark plugs Bosch W 240 T 1 or Beru 240 / 14

Suspension

- Designation 245/1
- Type of frame twin-loop steel tubular frame
- Front suspension long swinging arm with strut and oil-pressure shock absorbers
- Rear suspension long swinging arm with strut and oil-pressure shock absorbers
- Wheel rims deep-bed 2.15 B x 18 at sidecar, rear 2.75C x 18
- Tires front 3.50 x 18
- Tires rear 3.50 x 18 ( with sidecar 4 x 18)
- Brakes front drum brake, Ø 200 mm Duplex full hub
- Brakes rear drum brake, Ø 200 mm Simplex full hub

Dimensions and Weights

- Length x width x height 84 x 26 x 39 inches (2125 x 660 x 980 mm)
- Wheelbase 55.7 inch (1415 mm; with sidecar 1450 mm)
- Tank capacity 4.5 US gallon (17 L) / optional 6.5 US gallon (24.6 L)
- Unladen weight, full tank 430 lb (195 kg; with orig. BMW sidecar 320 kg)
- Load rating 360 kg (with orig. BMW sidecar 600 kg)

Performance

- Idle/riding noise 81/82 DIN-phon (from June 1967: 74 / 95 dB (A))
- Fuel consumption 47.0 MPG (ca. 5.0 L / 100 km)
- Oil consumption ca. 0.5 – 1 L / 1000 km
- Top speed 90 mph (145 km/h)

== See also ==
- History of BMW motorcycles
- List of motorcycles of the 1950s
