= R68 (South Africa) =

Provincial route in South Africa

Provincial route R68

Route information
- Maintained by KZNDT
- Length: 187 km (116 mi)

Major junctions
- West end: N11 near Glencoe
- R33 in Dundee
- East end: R34 / R66 near Melmoth

Location
- Country: South Africa
- Major cities: Glencoe, Dundee, Nqutu, Melmoth

Highway system
- Numbered routes of South Africa
← R67	→ R69

The R68 is a provincial route in KwaZulu-Natal, South Africa that connects Melmoth with Dundee.

== Route ==
Detailed Route

The R68 begins at an intersection with the N11 national route 40 kilometres south of Newcastle and 55 kilometres north of Ladysmith.

The R68 goes eastwards for 23 kilometres to the town of Dundee, where it meets the R33 route. At the Wilson Street junction in Dundee, the R33 joins the R68 and they are one road eastwards for 5 kilometres before the R33 becomes its own road north-east, leaving the R68 as the easterly road.

The R68 proceeds eastwards for 45 kilometres to the town of Nqutu, where it makes a right turn at the junction with the P45. The R68 continues east-south-east for 108 kilometres, through Babanango, to reach its eastern terminus at a junction with the R34 and R66 routes in Melmoth.
