= R618 (South Africa) =

Regional route in South Africa

Regional route R618

Route information
- Length: 206 km (128 mi)

Major junctions
- West end: R69 in Hlobane
- R66 near Nongoma; N2 near Mtubatuba
- East end: St. Lucia

Location
- Country: South Africa

Highway system
- Numbered routes of South Africa
| ← R617 | → R619 |

The R618 is a Regional Route in South Africa that connects Hlobane with St Lucia via Nongoma and Mtubatuba.

== Route ==
Its north-western terminus is the R69 at Hlobane, a village between Vryheid and Louwsburg. It heads east-southeast for 77 kilometres to reach a junction with the R66 at Nhlopenkulu. The R66 joins the R618 and they are one road southwards for 6 kilometres into the town of Nongoma, where the R66 becomes its own road southwards. The R618 continues east, then veers south, before traversing the Umfolozi Game Reserve in a southeasterly direction. After 94 kilometres, it reaches a junction with the N2 and proceeds to pass through Mtubatuba, where it turns east in the town centre. It heads east for 25 kilometres to St Lucia in the ISimangaliso Wetland Park.
