= BMW R69S =

BMW R69
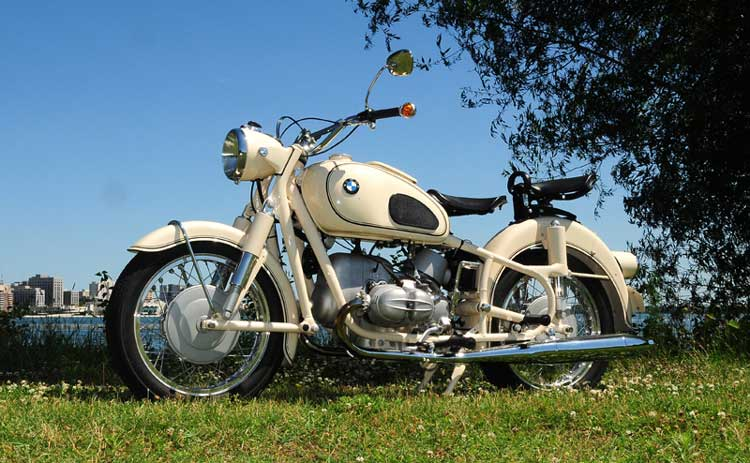
- BMW R69S with Earles fork
- Manufacturer: BMW
- Production: 1955-69
- Assembly: Munich, Germany
- Predecessor: R68
- Engine: 594 cc boxer twin
- Bore / stroke: 72 mm × 73 mm
- Compression ratio: 9.5:1
- Top speed: 165 km/h
- Power: 35-42 hp
- Ignition type: Magneto
- Frame type: Double loop steel tubular
- Suspension: Earles fork with suspension units and oil pressure shock absorbers
- Brakes: Drum brake 200 mm (7.9 in) diameter
- Tires: 3.5 × 18 S
- Dimensions: L: 2125 mm W: 722 mm H: 980 mm
- Weight: 202 kg (wet)
- Fuel capacity: 17 L
- Fuel consumption: 5.3 liters/100 km

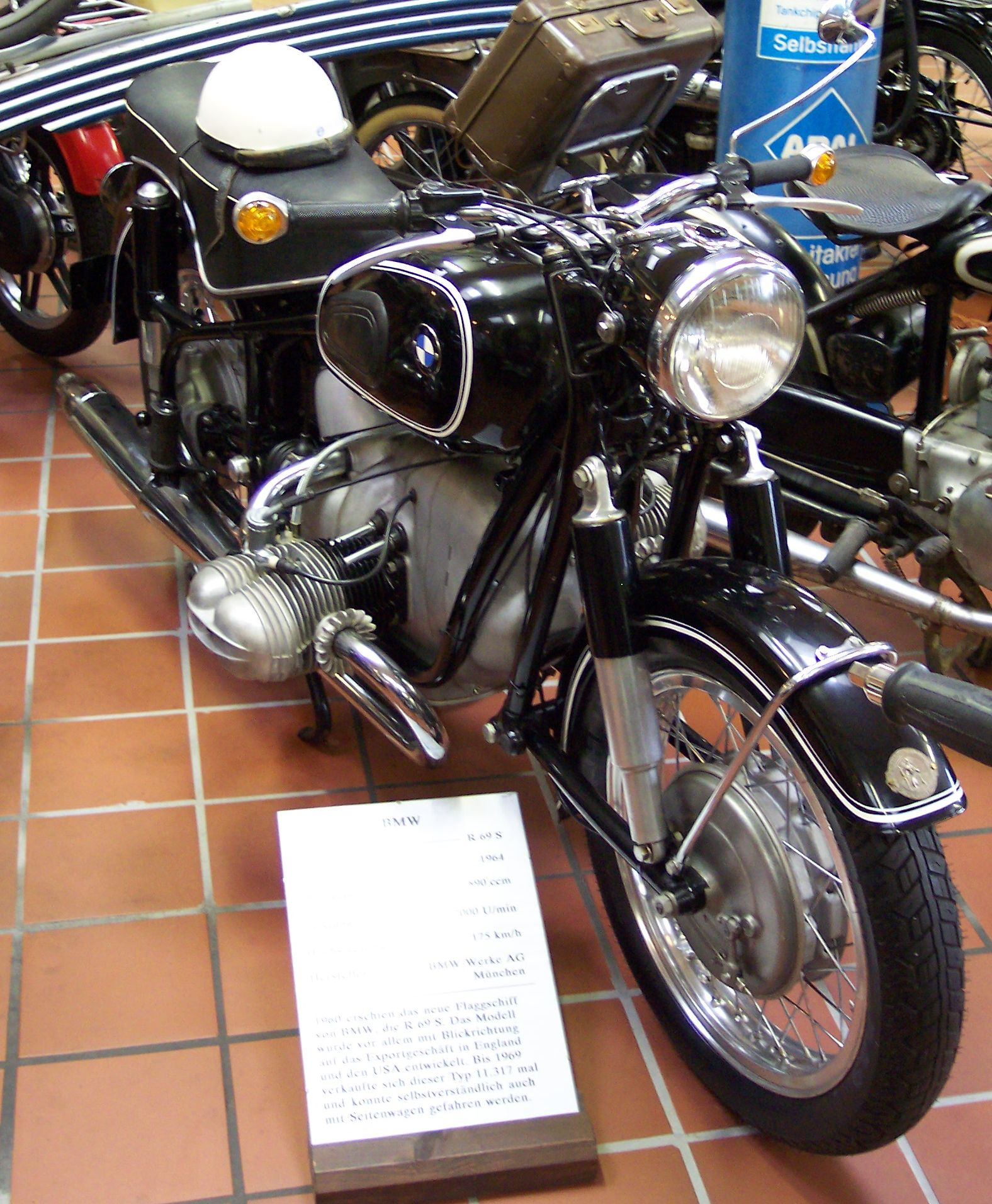
The BMW R69s with Earles fork

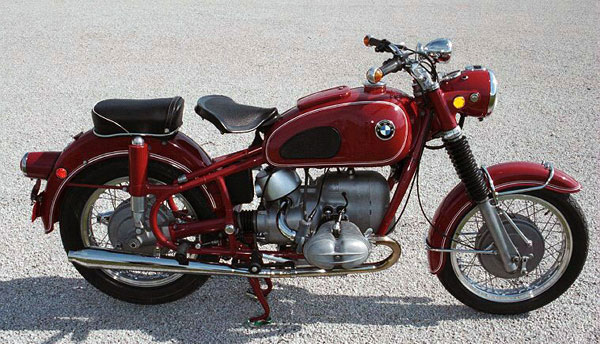
BMW R69US

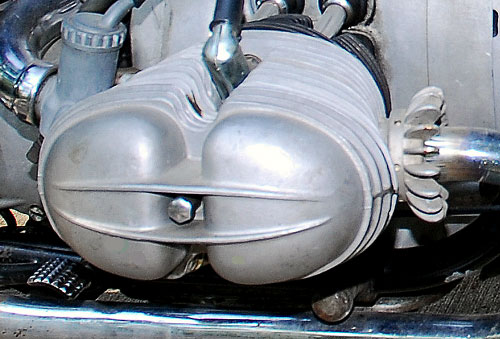
The R69S and R69 have valve covers with two fins

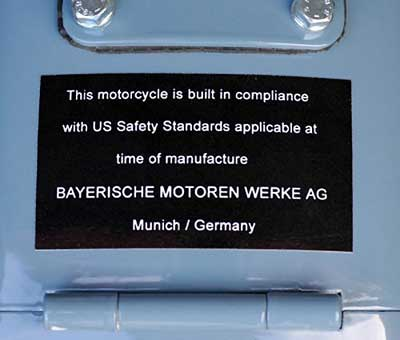
Decal required by DOT on all 1969 BMW motorcycles sold in the U. S.

The R69, R69S, and R69US are motorcycles, fitted with 594 cc boxer twin engines, that were manufactured by BMW in Munich, Germany.

== Production history ==
From 1955 to 1969, 15,347 of these 594 cc shaft-drive, opposed twin motorcycles were built. The 35 hp (26 kW) R69 was produced from 1955 to 1960, the 42 hp (31 kW) R69S was produced from 1960 to 1969, and the 42 hp R69US was produced from 1968 to 1969. These models were designed as relatively high powered, high compression sport bikes, although the Earles fork R69 and R69S came with sidecar lugs installed on the frames. These lugs were deleted from the telescopic fork "US" models. The low compression 30 hp (22 kW) R60/2, produced from 1955 to 1960, was designed primarily for sidecar use, though it was popularly used as a solo bike, along with the 30 hp R60US, which was produced between 1968 and 1969.

The sport-oriented R69S, R69US, and R69 succeeded the plunger-framed 1951 to 1955 R68, which had an engine very similar to that in the later R69.

The R69US models, with telescopic forks, which were used later on the BMW R-/5 series motorcycles, were introduced in the United States for the 1968 model year and then continued for 1969. Front and rear side reflectors, demanded by the U. S. Department of Transportation, were introduced only for the 1969 model year, along with a DOT sticker that was placed on the rear fender. The previous Earles fork continued to be offered during these years.

In June 1962, Cycle World magazine published a review of the R69S. Its initial and concluding paragraphs read:

Ask any motorcyclist what he considers to be the two-wheeled equivalent of the Rolls-Royce and you will almost certainly be told "BMW". That answer will not be too far wrong, either, except that the products coming from the Bayerische Motoren Werke incorporate a good deal more in advanced engineering features than the famous English car. Actually, the BMW motorcycle is more like the Mercedes than a Rolls-Royce: conservative in many respects, but quite advanced nonetheless. In any case, the BMW has attributes that make it unique, and it has acquired a reputation that makes it a "prestige" motorcycle — even among people who ordinarily don't give two wheelers a second glance. Whatever the BMW's merits in a contest of speed, it is still the smoothest, best finished, quietest and cleanest motorcycle it has ever been our pleasure to ride. To be honest, we think that anyone who would worry much over its performance-potential is a bit of a booby. The R69S is fast enough to handle any encounter, and it has attributes that are, in touring, infinitely more valuable than mere speed. All things considered, if we were planning a two-wheel style vacation/tour, the BMW would have to be our choice of mount.

== Specifications ==
R69S Specifications. (R69 specifications shown in parentheses when different from the R69S)

- Start of Production — 1960 (1955)
- End of Production — 1969 (1960)
- Numbers Produced — 11,317 (2,956)

=== Engine ===
- Internal Designation — 268/3 (268/2)
- Motor Type — Four-stroke two cylinder flat twin
- Bore × Stroke — 72 mm × 73 mm (2.83 in × 2.87 in)
- Displacement — 594 cc
- Max Power — 42 hp (31 kW) at 7000 rpm (35 hp or 26 kW at 6800 rpm)
- Compression Ratio — 9.5:1 (7.5:1)
- Valves — OHV
- Carburation System — 2 carburetors, Type Bing 1/26/75-1/26/76 or 1/26/91-1/26/92 (1/26/9-1/26/10)
- Engine Lubricating System — Forced feed lubrication
- Oil Pump — Gear pump

=== Power Transmission ===
- Clutch — Single plate, saucer spring, dry
- Number of Gears — 4
- Shifting — Foot shifting
- Gearbox Ratios — 4.17/2.73/1.94/1.54 (5.33/3.02/2/04/1.54)
- Rear Wheel Ratio — 1:3.375 or 1:3.13; with sidecar 1:4.33 (1:3.18 or 1:4.25 sidecar)
- Bevel/Crownwheel — 8/25 or 8/27 teeth; with sidecar 6/26 (11/35; 8/34 sidecar)

=== Electrical System ===
- Ignition System — Magneto ignition
- Generator — Bosch LJ/CGE 60/6/1700 R (Noris L 60/6/1500L)
- Spark Plugs — Bosch W260T1 or Beru 260/14 (Bosch W240T1)

=== Chassis ===
- Designation — 245/2 (245/1)
- Frame — Double loop steel tubular frame
- Front wheel suspension — Earles fork with suspension units and oil pressure shock absorbers
- Rear wheel suspension — Long swing arm with suspension units and oil pressure shock absorbers
- Wheel rims — Deep bed 2.15B × 18; with sidecar, rear 2.75C × 18
- Tires, Front — 3.5 × 18 S
- Tires, Rear — 3.50 S (4 × 18 S with sidecar)
- Brakes, Front — Drum brake 200 mm (7.9 in) diameter duplex full hub
- Brakes, Rear — Drum brake 200 mm (7.9 in) diameter simplex full hub

=== Dimensions/Weights ===
- Length × Width × Height — 2125 mm × 722 mm × 980 mm; (83.66 in × 28.42 in × 38.58 in)
- Wheel Base — 1415 mm (55.7 in); with original sidecar 1450 mm (57.1 in)
- Fuel Tank Capacity — 17 L (3.73 imp or 4.49 US gal)
- Unladen Weight with Full Tank — 202 kg (445 lb); with original sidecar 324 kg (714 lb)
- Idle/Riding Noise — 84/82 DIN phon; from 13 September 1966: 78/84 dB(A)
- Load Rating — 360 kg (790 lb); with original sidecar 600 kg (1,300 lb)
- Fuel Consumption — 5.3 liters/100 km / 44 mpg (US) (3.6 L/100 km or 64 mpg (US))
- Oil Consumption — 0.5 - 1 liters/1,000 km approx.
- Top Speed — 175 km/h (109 mph) (165 km/h or 103 mph)

== Speed record ==
In 1961 an English team [sic] of four riders used a considerably modified machine to set 12 and 24-hour average-speed records for both 750 cc and 1000 cc categories at Montlhéry, France. Modifications included a tuned engine with higher final drive ratio, a race-crouch riding position with race-style full fairing, and extra lights. The 1000 cc 24-hour achievement of 109.24 mph (175.80 km/h) endured until surpassed by a Kawasaki Z1 in 1972 on the banked Daytona racetrack, at an average speed of 109.64 mph (176.45 km/h).

== See also ==
- BMW R51/3
- BMW R60/2
- History of BMW motorcycles
- List of motorcycles of the 1950s
