= Nico Malan Pass =

Pass in South Africa

Coordinates: 32°28′50.6″S 26°50′10.0″E

Nico Malan Pass is situated in the Eastern Cape province of South Africa, on the regional tarred road R67 between Fort Beaufort and Komani. It was the site of a bus accident that killed 24 people in September 2002.
