= R619 (South Africa) =

Regional route in South Africa

Regional route R619

Location
- Country: South Africa

Highway system
- Numbered routes of South Africa
← R618	→ R620

The R619 is a Regional Route in South Africa.

== Route ==
Its northern terminus is the N2, north-east of Empangeni and north of Richards Bay. It heads south, for nine kilometers to meet the R34 at Richards Bay.
