= Municipal Routes in Gauteng =

There are two sets of numbered Metropolitan Routes in Gauteng. See:

- Metropolitan Routes in Johannesburg
- Metropolitan Routes in Pretoria
