= R67 (South Africa) =

Provincial route in South Africa

Provincial route R67

Route information
- Maintained by ECDRPW
- Length: 263 km (163 mi)

Major junctions
- South end: R72 in Port Alfred
- N2 near Grahamstown; R63 in Fort Beaufort
- North end: R61 in Komani

Location
- Country: South Africa
- Major cities: Grahamstown, Komani
- Towns: Port Alfred, Fort Beaufort, Seymour, Whittlesea

Highway system
- Numbered routes of South Africa
| ← R66 | → R68 |

The R67 is a provincial route in Eastern Cape, South Africa that connects Port Alfred with Komani (previously Queenstown) via Grahamstown.

== Route ==
Detailed Route

The R67 begins in Port Alfred, at a junction with the R72 road. It begins by going north-north-west for 54 kilometres, through Bathurst, becoming the Blaauwkrantz Pass, to reach an interchange with the N2 national route south of the Grahamstown town centre (renamed Makhanda in 2018). The R67 joins the N2 and they are one road eastwards for 9 kilometres before the R67 becomes its own road northwards.

From the N2 split east of Makhanda, the R67 goes northwards for 70 kilometres as the Ecca Pass, crossing the Great Fish River and following the Kat River, to reach a junction with the R63 road in the town of Fort Beaufort. The R67 joins the R63 and they are one road eastwards for 650 metres up to a t-junction, where the R63 becomes the road southwards and the R67 becomes the road northwards.

From Fort Beaufort, the R67 goes northwards for 97 km as the Nico Malan Pass, following the Kat River up to the Katrivier Dam (Seymour), bypassing the Waterdown Dam, to enter the town of Whittlesea. From Whittlesea, the R67 goes northwards for 33 kilometres to reach its northern terminus at a roundabout junction with the R61 road in the town of Komani, just south-west of the R61's intersection with the N6 national route.
