= Warburton, Mpumalanga =

Warburton
- Location within Mpumalanga Location within South Africa
- Coordinates: 26.233°S 30.476°E
- Country: South Africa
- Province: Mpumalanga
- District: Gert Sibande
- Municipality: Msukaligwa

Area
  - Total: 3.05 km^{2} (1.18 sq mi)

Population (2011)
  - Total: 2,847
  - Density: 933/km^{2} (2,420/sq mi)

Racial makeup (2011)
  - Black African: 97.6%
  - Coloured: 0.2%
  - Indian/Asian: 0.9%
  - White: 1.2%
  - Other: 0.1%

First languages (2011)
  - Swazi: 67.9%
  - Zulu: 26.3%
  - Afrikaans: 1.5%
  - English: 1.3%
  - Other: 2.9%
- Time zone: UTC+2 (SAST)
- PO box: 2333
- Area code: 017

Warburton is a town in Msukaligwa Local Municipality in the Mpumalanga province of South Africa.
