= BMW R68 =

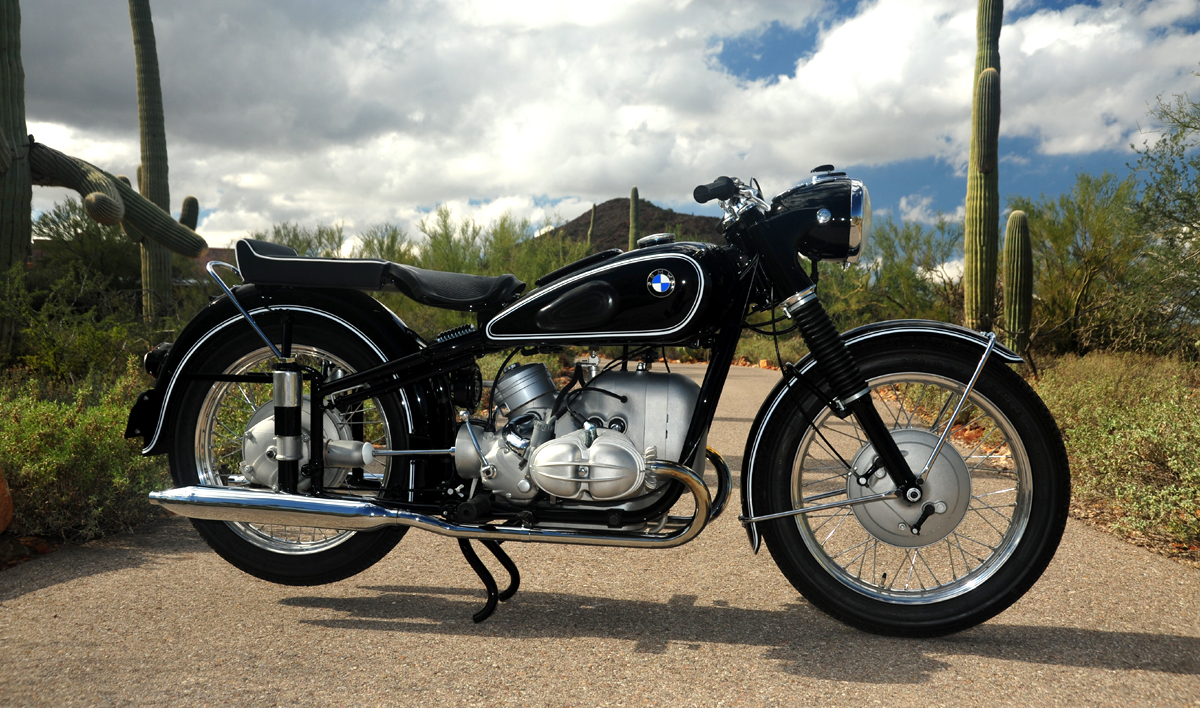
- 1954 R68 (featuring full-width brakes)
- Manufacturer: BMW AG, Munich, Germany
- Production: 1952–1954
- Predecessor: 1938–1941 R66
- Successor: 1955–1960 R69, 1961–1969 R69S
- Class: standard
- Engine: 594cc BMW 268/1 OHV air-cooled flat-twin
- Bore / stroke: 72 mm × 73 mm (2.83 in × 2.87 in)
- Compression ratio: 8.0:1
- Top speed: 169 km/h (105 mph)
- Power: 35 hp (26 kW) @ 7,000 rpm
- Transmission: 4-speed manual foot shift
- Suspension: Front: Telescopic; Rear: Telescopic plungers
- Brakes: Front: 200 mm duplex drum Rear: 200 mm simplex drum
- Tires: 19 x 3.5 front and rear
- Wheelbase: 1,400 mm (55 in)
- Dimensions: L: 2,130 mm (84 in); W: 725 mm (28.5 in); H: 985 mm (38.8 in)
- Weight: 190 kg (419 lb) (wet)
- Fuel capacity: 17 L (3.7 imp gal; 4.5 US gal)
- Fuel consumption: approximately 4.6 litres per 100 kilometres (61 mpg_{‑imp}; 51 mpg_{‑US})

The BMW R68 is a 594 cc (36.2 cu in) sport version of the pre-1955 BMW motorcycles. A total of 1,452 models were manufactured from 1952 to 1954, making it one of BMW's rarest production motorcycles.

== History ==
In October 1951, at the German International Motorcycle Show in Frankfurt, BMW displayed a new high performance model. The machine had improved performance of 35 hp (26 kW) compared to the low-compression R67/2, a racing-type magneto, bigger bore 26 mm Bing carburetors and improved twin leading-shoe front brake. It also came with a more modern sporty narrow front fender rather than the deeply valanced fender used on other BMW twins. BMW announced the R68 as "The first 100 mph motorcycle." It was shown as a road bike, capable of 105 mph (169 km/h), with normal two low exhaust silencers, and an off-road version with a single high silencer. A separate pillion pad resembled a passenger saddle, but was provided for the rider to slide backward in order to crouch low for higher speeds.

For the 1954 model year, BMW introduced full-width brakes on the R68. Previously they had half-width brakes.

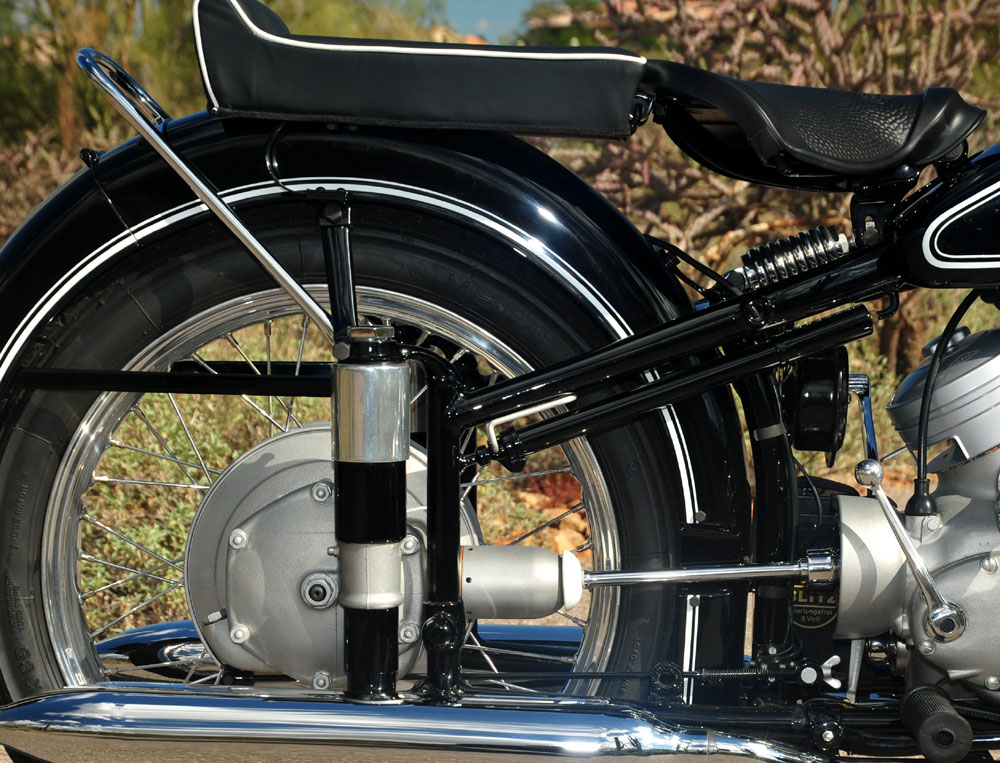
R68 rear and shaft drives and seats arrangement

In the photo to the left are some of the unusual elements of the rear part of the R68. Note the exposed, hard chrome drive shaft connecting the rear drive on the left with the rear of the transmission on the right. A plunger attached to the rear drive limits vertical movement so the front of the drive shaft is connected to the transmission with a round rubber puck with holes to receive the drive shaft's attachment plate.

The hand-operated tire pump held under the frame has a swing-out lever so the rider can hold it down with his foot, unlike later BMW tire pumps.

The rider's saddle is suspended with a large chrome plated spring and is connected directly to the rear saddle so the rider can slide backward and crouch at higher speeds. Rear foot pegs were normally included for the rider to use when sliding on the rear saddle to crouch for high speeds.

The short vertical handle on the side of the transmission is often referred to as a mechanic's shifter.

A 1954 R68 restored by Tim Stafford of San Diego took second place among German motorcycles at the 2012 Pebble Beach Concours d'Elegance.

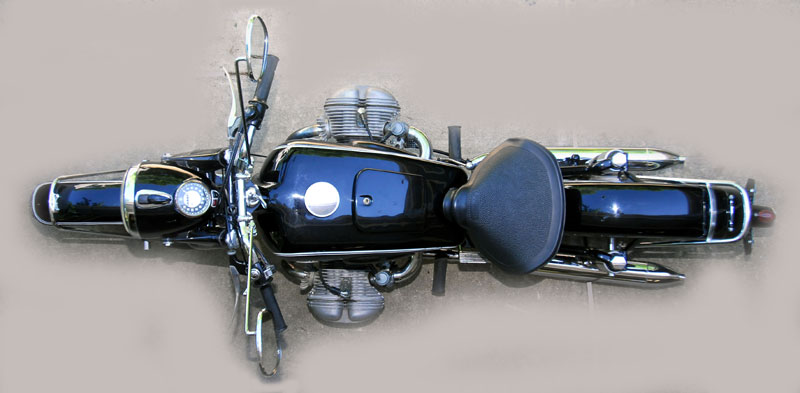
Top view of an R68

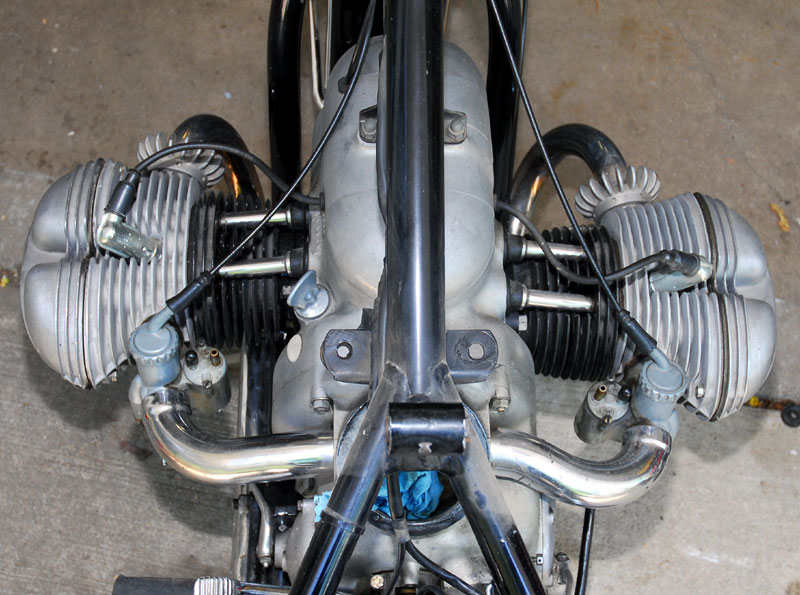
Two cylinder heads and boxer design are easily seen with the fuel tank removed.

== See also ==
- History of BMW motorcycles
- BMW R51/3
- List of motorcycles of the 1950s
