= Gingindlovu =

- KwaGingindlovu
- Location within KwaZulu-Natal Location within South Africa
- Coordinates: 29°1′S 31°35′E
- Country: South Africa
- Province: KwaZulu-Natal
- District: King Cetshwayo
- Municipality: uMlalazi

Area
  - Total: 2.39 km^{2} (0.92 sq mi)

Population (2011)
  - Total: 1,109
  - Density: 464/km^{2} (1,200/sq mi)

Racial makeup (2011)
  - Black African: 57.6%
  - Coloured: 11.3%
  - Indian/Asian: 29.2%
  - White: 1.1%
  - Other: 0.8%

First languages (2011)
  - Zulu: 49.1%
  - English: 44.8%
  - Afrikaans: 1.6%
  - S. Ndebele: 1.2%
  - Other: 3.3%
- Time zone: UTC+2 (SAST)
- Postal code (street): 3800
- PO box: 3800
- Area code: 035

Gingindlovu, officially renamed to KwaGingindlovu, is a town in the King Cetshwayo District Municipality, part of the KwaZulu-Natal province of South Africa.

Village 21 km south-east of Eshowe. The name was first applied to one of Cetshwayo's military kraals nearby. Of Zulu origin, it is said to mean 'place of the big elephant' or, more possibly, 'swallower of the elephant', referring to Cetshwayo's victory over his brother Mbulazi in 1856.
