= BMW R51/3 =

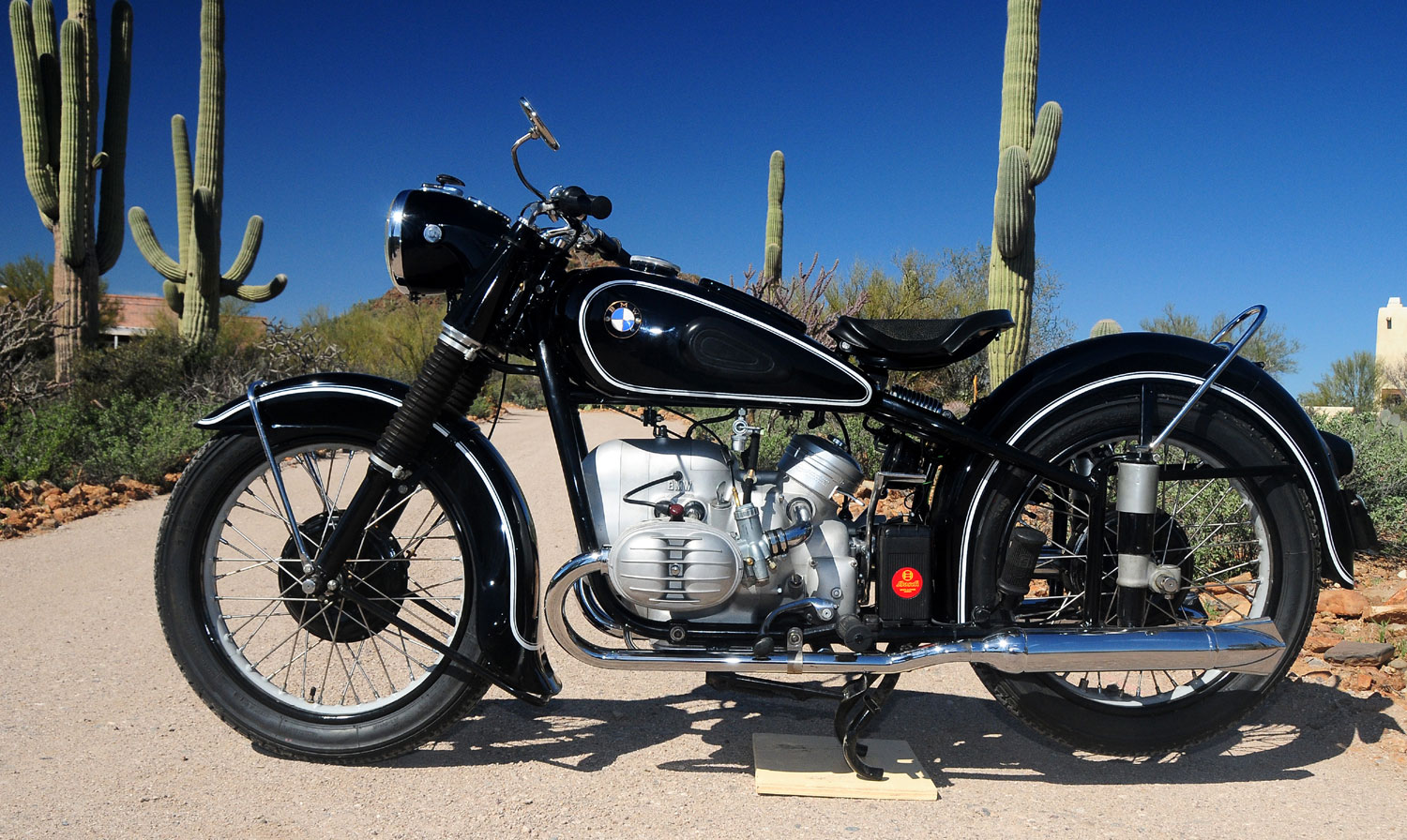
- A 1952 R51/3 – note the half-width brakes before 1954
- Manufacturer: BMW
- Production: 1951-5
- Engine: 494cc four-stroke flat-twin
- Bore / stroke: 68 mm × 68 mm (2.68 in × 2.68 in)
- Compression ratio: 6.3:1
- Top speed: 140 km/h
- Power: 24 hp
- Ignition type: Magneto
- Transmission: Single-plate dry clutch, 4-Speed manual
- Suspension: Front telescopic forks, rear plunger
- Brakes: 200mm drums
- Wheelbase: 1400mm
- Dimensions: L: 2130mm W: 790mm H: 985mm
- Weight: 190 kg (wet)
- Fuel capacity: 17 L
- Oil capacity: 2 L
- Fuel consumption: 4.5L/100KM

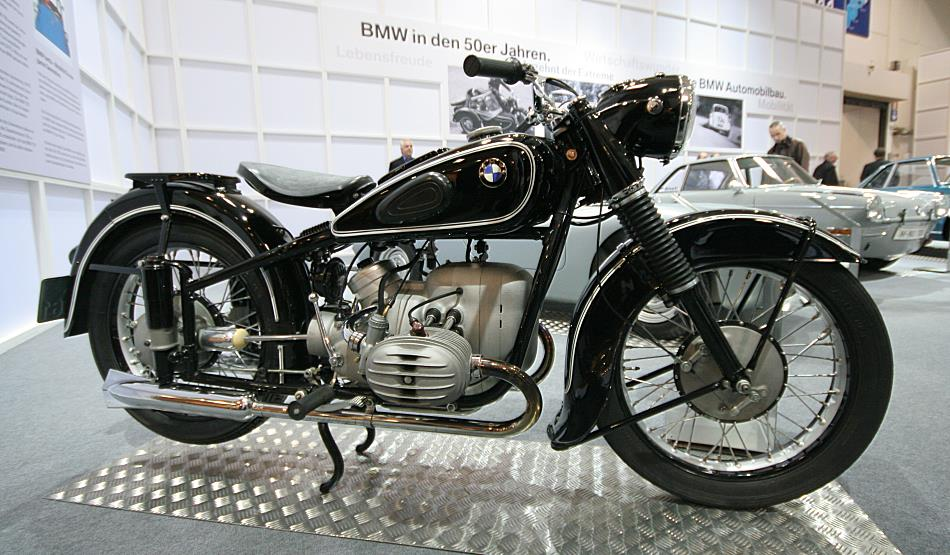
1951 R51/3 at the BMW Museum

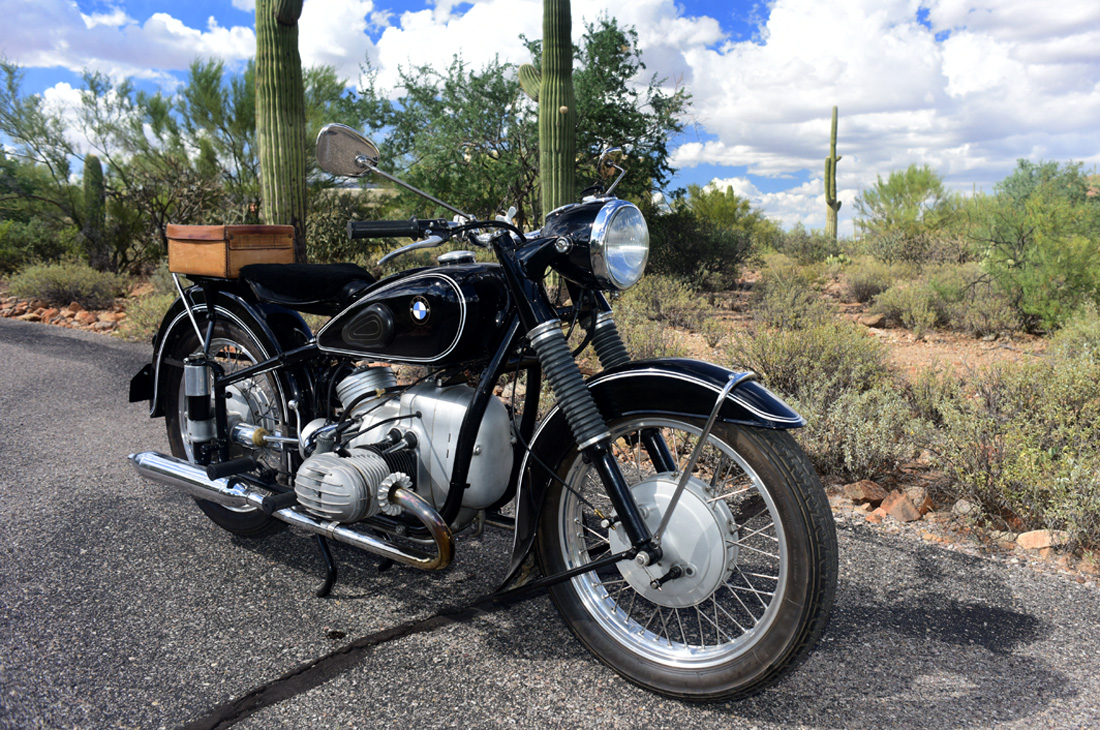
1955 BMW R67/3

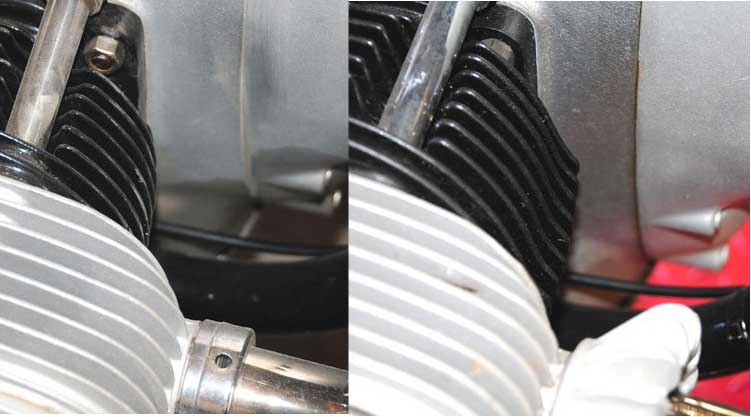
An R51/3 has eight round cylinder fins (left); the R67-R67/3 have nine larger and pointed cylinder fins (right)

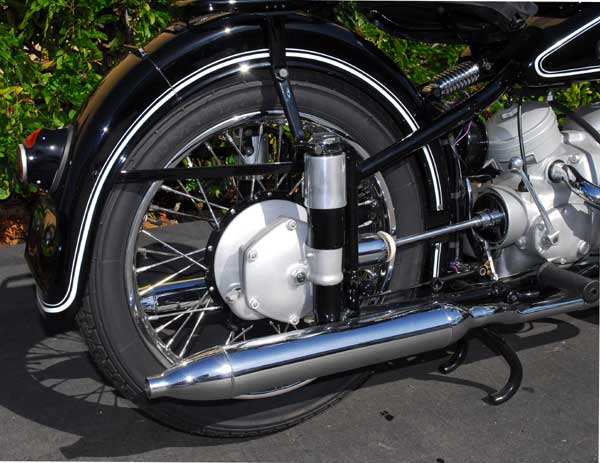
Note the exposed driveshaft and plunger rear suspension

The BMW R51/3 was BMW's second post-World War II 500 cc motorcycle, following the briefly produced R51/2. It featured a flat-twin engine and exposed drive shaft. In 1951, the R51/3 succeeded and modernized the 1950 R51/2, which was essentially a pre-war design that was produced after the war. The 600 cc R67, R67/2, and R67/3 series and the more sporting R68 model also followed the R51/2.

== History ==
Following World War II, Germany was precluded from producing motorcycles of any sort by the Allies. When the ban was lifted, in Allied-controlled Western Germany, BMW had to start from scratch. There were no plans, blueprints, or schematic drawings. Company engineers had to use surviving pre-war motorcycles to create new plans. In 1948, it introduced the 250 cc R24, which was essentially a pre-war R23, complete with rigid rear end.

When larger machines were permitted, BMW introduced its R51/2 in 1950, a model that was in production for only one year and that was essentially a pre-war BMW produced after the war. The R51/3 was then introduced in 1951 for a production run of four years.

The 600 cc R67, sister model to the R51/3 and almost identical visually, was also introduced in 1951, but it went through two revisions. The more powerful R67/2 came out one year later and was replaced in 1955 by the R67/3, which was in production through the 1956 model year.

In 1952, BMW introduced the 600 cc R68, which produced 35 hp (26 kW), had a compression ratio of 8.0:1.

== Technical data ==
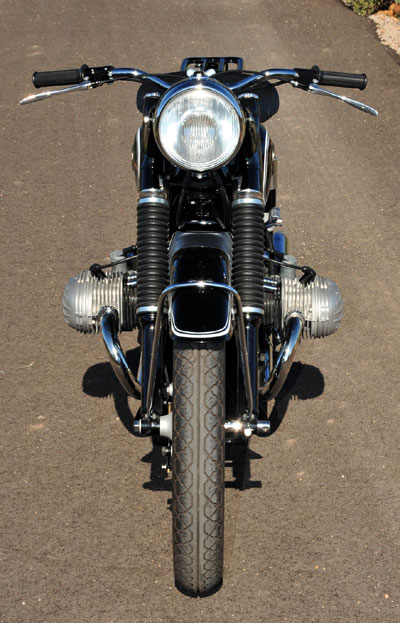
Front view of an R51/3

	R51/3	R67 – R67/3
Design	Boxer Flat Twin	
Engine	Four-stroke OHV	
Model Years	1951–1955	1951–1956
Bore	68 mm / 2.68 in	72 mm / 2.83 in
Stroke	68 mm / 2.68 in	73 mm / 2.87 in
Displacement	494 cc (30.1 cu in)	594 cc (36.2 cu in)
Power	24 hp (18 kW) @ 5800 rpm	26 hp (19 kW) / 28 hp (21 kW) @ 5500 rpm
Compression Ratio	6.3:1	5.6:1 / 6.5:1
Top Speed	140 km/h (87 mph)	150 km/h (93 mph)
Curb Weight	190 kg (419 lb)	
Gross Vehicle Weight	355 kg (783 lb)	
Fuel Tank Capacity	17 L (3.7 imp gal; 4.5 US gal)	

== See also ==
- History of BMW motorcycles
- Motorcycle fork
- BMW R68
- List of motorcycles of the 1950s
