= R69 (South Africa) =

Provincial route in South Africa

Provincial route R69

Route information
- Maintained by KZNDT
- Length: 161 km (100 mi)

Major junctions
- West end: R33 / R34 in Vryheid
- R66 between Nongoma and Pongola
- East end: N2 near Mkuze

Location
- Country: South Africa
- Major cities: Vryheid, Louwsburg, Mkuze

Highway system
- Numbered routes of South Africa
← R68	→ R70

The R69 is a provincial route in KwaZulu-Natal, South Africa that connects Vryheid with Mkuze via Louwsburg.

== Route ==
The R69 begins in Vryheid (south of the town centre), at a junction with the R34 route next to the White Umfolozi Dam. It heads north-east before turning east to become Suid Street in the eastern suburbs of Vryheid. It heads east-north-east for 56 kilometres to reach the town of Louwsburg, where it passes south of the town centre. It continues eastwards for another 48 kilometres to reach a junction with the R66 route near a place named Magudu (22 kilometres south of Pongola). The R69 joins the R66 northwards for 3 kilometres before becoming its own road eastwards. The R69 heads north-east for 31 kilometres to reach its end at a junction with the N2 national route west of the Pongolapoort Dam (north of Mkuze).

Detailed Route
