= Blood River =

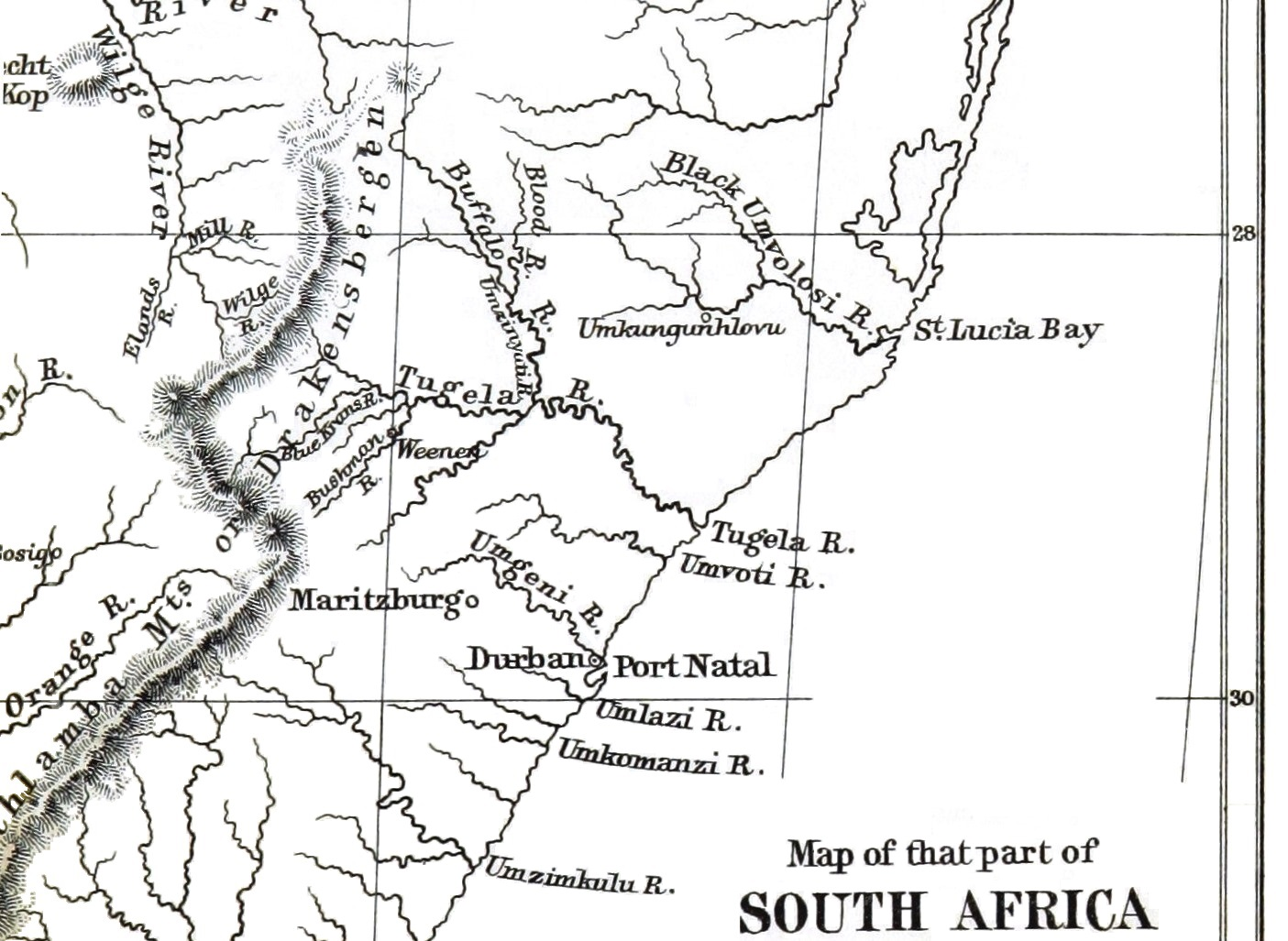

- Location of the Blood River's mouth
- Native name: Ncome (Zulu); Bloedrivier (Afrikaans)

Location
- Country: South Africa
- State: KwaZulu-Natal

Physical characteristics
- Source: Highlands SE of Utrecht
- Mouth
  - location: Buffalo River
  - coordinates: 27°50′56″S 30°35′35″E

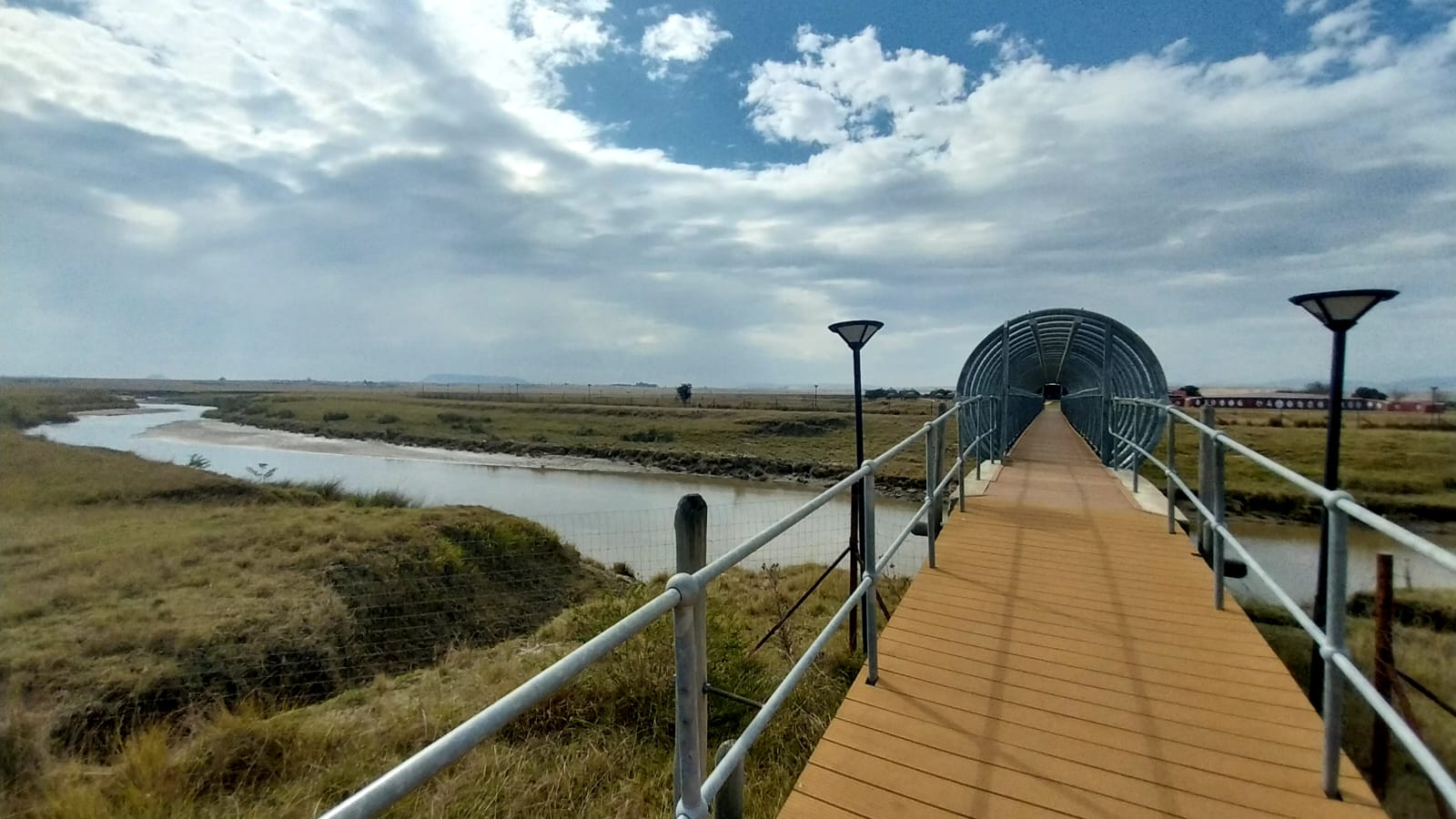
A picture depicting Blood River and Reconciliation Bridge built by the government.

Blood River, also known as the Ncome River (Afrikaans: Bloedrivier; Zulu: Ncome), is situated between Nquthu and Vryheid in KwaZulu-Natal, South Africa. This river has its sources in the hills south-east of Utrecht; leaving the highlands it is joined by two important tributaries that originate in the Schurveberg, after which it flows meandering through a sandy plain. The Blood River is a tributary of the Buffalo River, which is a tributary of the Thukela River which it joins from the north-east.

This river is named after the Battle of Blood River in which Zulu King Dingane was defeated by Andries Pretorius and his men on 16 December 1838. It is said that water turned red from the blood of Zulu men who died here en masse. It was a fight with 464 Boers and over 30,000 amabutho. The battle was celebrated as a 16 December holiday called Dingane's Day (Afrikaans: Dingaansdag), and later the Day of the Vow (Afrikaans: Geloftedag) in apartheid South Africa, as a sabbath day in remembrance of what God did for them, hence the name Vow. To Zulu people it was known as Dingane day. In 1994, after the end of Apartheid, it was named the Day of Reconciliation, an annual holiday also on 16 December.

The Blood River Vlei, located about 20 km to the south-west of Vryheid, is one of the biggest inland wetlands in South Africa and the wintering place of migratory birds such as ducks and geese.

== See also ==
- List of rivers of South Africa

== Bibliography ==
- Kajsa Norman, Bridge Over Blood River: The Rise and Fall of the Afrikaners, Hurst and Company, London, 2016, ISBN 9781849046817.
