= Sandlane =

Coordinates: 26°34′S 30°47′E

Sandlane is the westernmost town in Eswatini. It is located close to the border with South Africa, 40 kilometres southwest of the capital, Mbabane.
