= Melmoth, South Africa =

Melmoth
- eMthonjaneni
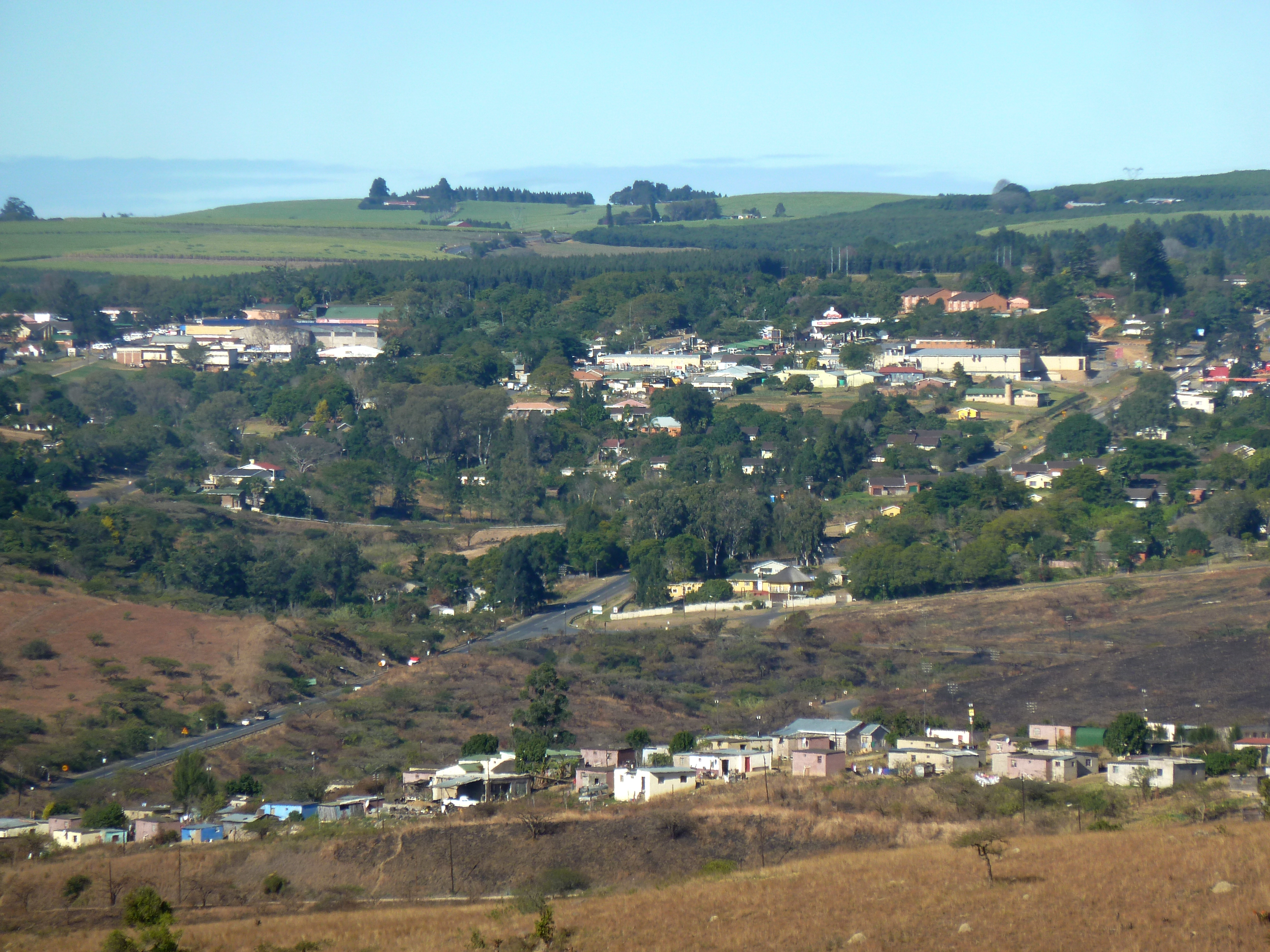
- View from the north

- Location within KwaZulu-Natal Location within South Africa
- Coordinates: 28°35′S 31°23′E
- Country: South Africa
- Province: KwaZulu-Natal
- District: King Cetshwayo
- Municipality: Mthonjaneni

Area
  - Total: 13.36 km^{2} (5.16 sq mi)
- Elevation: 740 m (2,430 ft)

Population (2022)
  - Total: 7,814
  - Density: 584.9/km^{2} (1,515/sq mi)

Racial makeup (2011)
  - Black African: 71.0%
  - Coloured: 1.4%
  - Indian/Asian: 0.8%
  - White: 23.6%
  - Other: 0.1%

First languages (2011)
  - Zulu: 77.5%
  - English: 4.5%
  - S. Ndebele: 2.7%
  - Afrikaans: 16.3%
  - Other: 3.1%
- Time zone: UTC+2 (SAST)
- Postal code (street): 3835
- PO box: 3835
- Area code: 035

Melmoth is a small town situated in KwaZulu-Natal, South Africa.

== History ==
The town was established in the Mthonjaneni district after the annexation of Zululand by the British Empire in 1887 and was named after Sir Melmoth Osborn, the resident commissioner of Zululand's "Reserve Territory". Large wattle plantations were set up and a wattle bark factory was established in 1926.

The Dutch Reformed Church of Melmoth was established in 1894 as the first Dutch Reformed Church in Zululand.

The district is also planted with sugar cane from the outskirts of the town and into the surrounding villages. The government-funded hospital in Melmoth is St Marys kwaMagwaza Hospital that caters for the people of Melmoth and surrounding villages.

=== In Recent Years ===
In 2017, the South African Geographical Names Council (SAGNC) made a decision to rename Melmoth to eMthonjaneni, the same name as the local municipality it is in.

== Notable people ==
- Shaka kaSenzangakhona (c. 1787 – 24 September 1828), King of the Zulu Kingdom from 1816 to 1828

== Number Plates ==
Vehicle registrations in Melmoth start with NO - N for Natal, O for Osborn.
