= List of regional routes in South Africa =

This is a list of regional routes in South Africa.

== R101–R120 ==
Route numbers with three digits starting with "R1" are given to sections of road that were formerly part of a national route with a corresponding number, when the national route has since been moved to a new alignment, usually a freeway. So, for example, the R102 number is given to road segments that were formerly part of the N2, and the R114 number is given to road segments that were formerly part of the N14.

No.	Route
R101	Section 1: Bellville – Brackenfell – Kraaifontein – Klapmuts – Paarl – Worcester; Section 2: Sandton – Centurion – Pretoria – Hammanskraal – Bela-Bela – Modimolle – Mookgophong – Mokopane – Polokwane
R102	Section 1: Cape Town – Bellville – Kuilsrivier –Somerset West; Section 2: Mossel Bay – George; Section 3: Grootrivier Pass through Nature's Valley; Section 4: Stormsrivier – Humansdorp – Jeffrey's Bay – Port Elizabeth – Colchester; Section 5: King William's Town – East London; Section 6: Port Shepstone – Hibberdene – Scottburgh – Kingsburgh – Amanzimtoti – Durban – Verulam – Tongaat – KwaDukuza – Mandeni – Empangeni
R103	Section 1: Gillitts – Hillcrest – Pietermaritzburg – Howick – Mooi River – Estcourt – Ladysmith; Section 2: Warden – Villiers; Section 3: Heidelberg (GP) – Johannesburg
R104	Section 1: Rustenburg – Hartbeespoort – Pretoria – Bronkhorstspruit – Balmoral – eMalahleni; Section 2: Middelburg (MP) – Wonderfontein; Section 3: Samora Machel Drive through Mbombela
R114	Muldersdrift – Centurion

== R300–R499 ==
Roads with a three-digit route number starting with 3 or 4 are located in the former Cape Province.

No.	Route
R300	Mitchells Plain – Kuilsrivier – Brackenfell
R301	R45 at Wemmershoek – Paarl – Wellington – R43 near Romansrivier
R302	Bellville – Durbanville – Klipheuwel – Malmesbury
R303	Ceres – Citrusdal
R304	Atlantis – Klipheuwel – Stellenbosch
R305	Stilbaai – N2 near Riversdale
R306	R61 near Beaufort West – N9 near Willowmore
R307	R27 near Atlantis – Atlantis – Darling – R45 near Moorreesburg
R308	R356 near Fraserburg – R63 near Carnarvon
R309	N8 between Groblershoop and Griekwastad – Postmasburg
R310	Muizenberg – Mitchell's Plain – Stellenbosch – R45 between Paarl and Franschhoek
R311	R45 near Hopefield – Moorreesburg – Riebeek-Kasteel
R312	R302 near Durbanville – R44 near Paarl
R313	Prieska – N8 near Griekwastad
R315	Yzerfontein – Darling – Malmesbury
R316	Caledon – Napier – Bredasdorp – Arniston
R317	Robertson – Bonnievale – Bredasdorp
R318	N1 near De Doorns – Montagu
R319	L'Agulhas – Struisbaai – Bredasdorp – N2 near Swellendam
R320	R43 near Hermanus – Caledon
R321	Grabouw – R45 near Villiersdorp
R322	R324 near Suurbraak – Heidelberg – Port Beaufort
R323	R62 near Ladismith – Riversdale - Laingsburg
R324	Barrydale – N2 near Swellendam – Witsand
R325	Kathu – Postmasburg – Griekwastad
R326	Stanford – N2 near Riviersonderend
R327	R62 near Ladismith – N2 near Mossel Bay
R328	Mossel Bay – Oudtshoorn – Prince Albert
R329	Willowmore – Steytlerville – R75 at Wolwefontein
R330	Hankey – Humansdorp – Cape St. Francis
R331	R332 near Patensie – Patensie – Hankey – N2 near Thornhill
R332	R331 near Patensie – R330 near Humansdorp
R334	N2 west of Port Elizabeth – Uitenhage – Coega
R335	N2 near Motherwell – Motherwell – Addo – Somerset East
R336	R75 west of Kirkwood – Kirkwood – Addo
R337	R329 between Willowmore and Steytlerville – Klipplaat – Jansenville – Pearston – Cradock
R338	Aberdeen – Klipplaat – R329 at Baroe
R339	N2 near Knysna – Avontuur – Uniondale – R341 north of Uniondale
R340	N2 near Keurboomsrivier – R339 on Prince Alfred Pass
R341	De Rust – N9 between Uniondale and Willowmore
R342	R335 near Addo – Paterson – N2
R343	N2 near Grahamstown – Kenton-on-Sea
R344	Dordrecht – Sterkstroom – Tarkastad – Adelaide – Grahamstown
R345	Cathcart – Hogsback – Alice – Peddie – R72
R346	Stutterheim – King William's Town – East London
R347	R346 near King William's Town – R72 near Kidd's Beach
R349	N2 near Komga – Kei Mouth – Kentani – Willowvale – Coffee Bay – Port St Johns
R350	Bedford – Grahamstown
R351	R67 near Katberg – Whittlesea – Cathcart – R61 between Queenstown and Qamata
R352	Dimbaza – Keiskammahoek – Stutterheim – Tsomo
R353	Brandvlei – Williston – Fraserburg – Leeu-Gamka
R354	R27 near Calvinia – Sutherland – Matjiesfontein
R355	Kleinzee – Springbok – Loeriesfontein – Calvinia – R46 near Ceres
R356	R46 near Ceres – Sutherland – Fraserburg – Loxton
R357	Nieuwoudtville – Loeriesfontein – Brandvlei – Van Wyksvlei – Prieska – Douglas – Kimberley
R358	N7 near Bitterfontein – Pofadder – Onseepkans (– Karasburg, Namibia)
R359	Augrabies Falls – Kakamas – Upington
R360	(Mariental, Namibia –) Mata Mata – Kgalagadi Transfrontier Park – Upington
R361	Kenhardt – Van Wyksvlei – R386 near Carnarvon
R362	Doringbaai – Lutzville – Vredendal – Klawer (along the north bank)
R363	Nuwerus – Lutzville – Vredendal – Klawer (along the south bank)
R364	Lambert's Bay – Graafwater – Clanwilliam – R27 between Nieuwoudtville and Calvinia
R365	Lambert's Bay – Leipoldtville – Piketberg
R366	Elands Bay – Redelinghuys – R365
R369	R357 near Prieska – Hopetown – Petrusville – Colesberg
R370	Douglas – Schmidtsdrift – Jan Kempdorp
R371	N14 between Kuruman and Vryburg – Reivilo – R370
R372	N14 near Kuruman – Reivilo – Taung
R374	Barkly West – Windsorton – N12 at Windsorton Road
R375	Makopong – Bray – Vergeleë – Mareetsane – Sannieshof
R376	R378 between Tosca and Ganyesa – Vorstershoop – Makopong
R377	Vergeleë – Piet Plessis – Stella – N14 near Delareyville
R378	R375 between Makopong and Bray – Tosca – Ganyesa – Vryburg
R380	(Tsabong, Botswana –) McCarthy's Rest – Hotazel – Kathu
R381	Loxton – Beaufort West
R382	Port Nolloth – Steinkopf
R383	Kenhardt – Marydale – R313 near Griekwastad
R384	Carnarvon – Vosburg – Britstown
R385	N14 near Olifantshoek – Postmasburg – R31 near Daniëlskuil – Campbell – Douglas
R386	Prieska – Carnarvon
R387	N12 near Strydenburg – R369 near Orania
R388	Hopetown – De Aar – Richmond
R389	Philipstown – N1 near Hanover – Noupoort
R390	Bethulie – Venterstad – Steynsburg – Hofmeyr – Cradock
R391	Hofmeyr – Burgersdorp
R392	Queenstown – Dordrecht – Lady Grey – Herschel – Sterkspruit
R393	Sterkspruit – Tele Bridge – Lundin's Nek – Moshesh's Ford – R58 near Elliot
R394	N2 near Kokstad – R61 between Flagstaff and Bizana
R396	R410 near Lady Frere – Indwe – Barkly East – Moshesh's Ford – Rhodes – Maclear – Tsolo – N2 north of Mthatha
R397	Burgersdorp – Stormberg – Molteno – Sterkstroom – N6
R398	N12 near Britstown – Merriman – Richmond – Middelburg
R399	Vredenburg – Velddrif – N7 near Piketberg
R400	R75 between Jansenville and Wolwefontein – Riebeeck East – R350 near Grahamstown
R401	R61 near Bethesda Road – Hofmeyr – R61 near Tarkastad
R402	Kareedouw – N2
R403	R386 near Prieska – Vosburg – N12 near Victoria West
R404	N9 near George – Herolds Bay
R405	Mount Frere – R56 near Matatiele
R406	N2 near Caledon – Genadendal – Greyton – N2 near Riviersonderend
R407	Prince Albert Road – Prince Albert – Klaarstroom – Willowmore
R408	Ngcobo – Dutywa – Willowvale
R409	R61 near Tsomo – Tsomo – Bholani – N2 near Butterworth – Kentani
R410	R392 near Queenstown – Lady Frere – Cala – R58 near Elliot
R411	N2 near Mthatha – Coffee Bay
R412	R61 near Mthatha – Ugie

== R500–R599 ==
Roads with a three-digit route number starting with 5 are located in the former Transvaal Province.

No.	Route
R500	R509 near Magaliesburg – Carletonville – Fochville – R53 near Parys
R501	R59 near Viljoenskroon – Potchefstroom – Carletonville – N12 near Westonaria
R502	N12 between Bloemhof and Wolmaransstad – Makwassie – Leeudoringstad – Orkney – N12 between Klerksdorp and Potchefstroom
R503	Mafikeng – Lichtenburg – Coligny – Klerksdorp
R504	Pudimoe – Schweizer-Reneke – Wolmaransstad – Leeudoringstad – Bothaville
R505	Wesselsbron – Makwassie – Wolmaransstad – Ottosdal – Lichtenburg – Ottoshoop
R506	Delareyville – Schweizer-Reneke – Christiana
R507	Setlagole – Delareyville – Ottosdal – Hartbeesfontein – R30 between Klerksdorp and Ventersdorp
R508	Musina – Tshipise
R509	Swartruggens – Koster – Derby – Magaliesburg
R510	Botswana border at Stockpoort – Lephalale – Thabazimbi – Rustenburg
R511	R510 near Thabazimbi – Brits – Hartebeespoort – N14 exit 309 – N1 exit 95
R512	Brits – Broederstroom – Lanseria – N14 exit 295 – N1 exit 90 – Randburg
R513	R511 near Hartebeespoort – Pretoria North – Cullinan – Bronkhorstspruit
R514	Pretoria – R511 near Hartebeespoort
R515	Cullinan – Rayton – N4 – R25 between Bapsfontein and Bronkhorstspruit
R516	R511 near Thabazimbi – Bela-Bela – R519 between Mookgophong and Roedtan
R517	N1 near Modimolle – Modimolle – Vaalwater – R510 between Lephalale and Thabazimbi
R518	Lephalale – Mokopane – Lebowakgomo
R519	Mookgophong – Roedtan – N1 near Polokwane
R520	Mookgophong – Vanalphensvlei
R521	Pontdrift border post – Alldays – Polokwane
R522	R521 between Polokwane and Alldays – Louis Trichardt
R523	R521 between Polokwane and Alldays – N1 between Louis Trichardt and Musina – Thohoyandou
R524	Louis Trichardt – Thohoyandou – Punda Maria Gate
R525	N1 between Louis Trichardt and Musina – Tshipise – Pafuri Gate
R526	Gravelotte – R40 between Phalaborwa and Hoedspruit – R36 between Tzaneen and Ohrigstad
R527	R36 between Tzaneen and Ohrigstad – Hoedspruit
R528	Haenertsburg – Tzaneen
R529	R36 between Tzaneen and Ohrigstad – Letsitele – Giyani
R531	R527 near Hoedspruit – Klaserie – Orpen Gate
R532	R36 between Tzaneen and Ohrigstad – Blyde River Canyon – Graskop – Sabie – R536 near Sabie
R533	R36 between Ohrigstad and Mashishing – Pilgrim's Rest – Graskop – Bushbuckridge
R534	R532 near Graskop – God's Window – R532 further from Graskop
R535	R533 near Graskop – Hazyview
R536	Sabie – Hazyview – Paul Kruger Gate
R537	Sabie – White River
R538	R40 near Hazyview – White River – N4 near Nelspruit
R539	R36 between Waterval Boven and Mashishing – N4 near Montrose pass – R37 between Sabie and Nelspruit
R540	Belfast – Dullstroom – Mashishing
R541	Machadodorp – Badplaas – N17 between Chrissiesmeer and Ngwenya
R542	Vandyksdrif – Hendrina – Breyten – Chrissiesmeer
R543	Vrede – Volksrust – Wakkerstroom – Piet Retief – Mahamba border post
R544	R573 between Pretoria and Marble Hall – Witbank – R35 near Bethal
R545	N4 between Bronkhorstspruit and Witbank – Ogies – Bethal
R546	Kinross – Standerton – Vrede
R547	R555 near Witbank – Kriel – Kinross – R23 between Greylingstad and Standerton
R548	R50 near Delmas – Devon – R51 near Balfour
R549	Heidelberg – Deneysville
R550	Ennerdale – Nigel – Devon
R551	Evaton – Meyerton – R42 near Suikerbosrand Nature Reserve
R552	Lanseria International Airport – Fourways
R553	R42 near Vanderbijlpark – Sebokeng – Evaton – M1 near Johannesburg
R554	Lenasia – Alberton – Springs
R555	Springs – Delmas – Witbank – Middelburg (MP) – Burgersfort – Ohrigstad
R556	Sun City – N4 at Modderspruit
R557	R550 near Ennerdale – Daleside – R42 between Vereeniging and Heidelberg
R558	Krugersdorp – Lenasia – Ennerdale
R559	Randfontein – R558 near Lenasia
R560	R24 near Magaliesburg – R512 near Hartbeespoort Dam
R561	R518 at Marken – Maasstroom – Zanzibar border post
R562	N14 exit 309 – N1 exit 115 – R21 exit 25
R563	R560 between Magaliesburg and Hartbeespoort – Krugersdorp
R564	Roodepoort – Fourways – R101 near Buccleuch
R565	R24 near Rustenburg – R556 at Sun City
R566	R512 near Brits – Rosslyn – R101 at Pretoria North
R567	N11 between Mokopane and Botswana – Polokwane
R568	R25 near Bronkhorstspruit – Ekangala – KwaMhlanga – Siyabuswa
R569	R538 between White River and Hazyview – Numbi Gate
R570	Malelane Gate – Jeppe's Reef border post
R571	Crocodile Bridge Gate – Komatipoort – Mananga border post
R572	R510 near Lephalale – Swartwater – Alldays – Musina
R573	Pretoria – KwaMhlanga – Siyabuswa – Marble Hall
R575	R555 near Middelburg – R544 between Witbank and Bethal
R576	R101 – N1 exit 224 – R516 near Settlers
R577	Roossenekal – Mashishing
R578	N1 near Louis Trichardt – Elim – R81 near Giyani
R579	R37 near Chuenespoort – Lebowakgomo – Jane Furse – R33 near Stoffberg
R580	R50 between Delmas and Leandra – R546 near Secunda

== R600–R699 ==
Roads with a three-digit route number starting with 6 are located in KwaZulu-Natal.

No.	Route
R600	N11 near Ladysmith – Winterton – Champagne Castle
R602	N11 between Ladysmith and Newcastle – Glencoe – Dundee
R603	Kingsburgh – N3 near Camperdown
R612	R617 near Bulwer – Donnybrook – Ixopo – Umzinto – Park Rynie
R614	R33 between Pietermaritzburg and Mpolweni – Tongaat
R616	N3 near Ladysmith – Bergville
R617	Kokstad – Franklin – Underberg – Howick
R618	Alpha – Nongoma – Mtubatuba – Greater St. Lucia Wetland Park
R619	N2 near Empangeni – Richards Bay
R620	R61 in Southbroom – Ramsgate – Margate – Uvongo – Shelly Beach – Port Shepstone
R621	Dundee – Hattingspruit – Dannhauser – N11 between Ladysmith and Newcastle
R622	Mooi River – Greytown
R624	R56 near Richmond – R603 near Mpumalanga

== R700–R799 ==
Roads with a three-digit route number starting with 7 are located in the Free State.

No.	Route
R700	Bloemfontein – Bultfontein – Hoopstad
R701	R26 near Wepener – Smithfield – Bethulie – N1 near Gariep Dam
R702	Bloemfontein – Dewetsdorp – Wepener – Van Rooyen's Gate
R703	R26 near Clocolan – Excelsior – Verkeerdevlei – Brandfort – Soutpan – R64 near Dealesville
R704	Trompsburg – Jagersfontein – Fauresmith – Koffiefontein
R705	N12 near Ritchie – Jacobsdal – R48 near Koffiefontein
R706	Bloemfontein – R704 near Jagersfontein
R707	Marquard – Senekal – Arlington – Lindley – Petrus Steyn – R34 near Frankfort
R708	Jan Kempdorp – Christiana – Hertzogville – Bultfontein – Theunissen – Winburg – Marquard – Clocolan
R709	Hobhouse –Tweespruit – Excelsior – Winburg
R710	Bultfontein – Welkom
R711	Bethlehem – Clarens – Fouriesburg
R712	Harrismith – Clarens
R713	R34 near Kroonstad – R30 between Odendaalsrus and Bothaville
R714	Bethlehem – Warden
R715	Springfontein – Bethulie
R716	Viljoensdrif – Oranjeville – R26 between Frankfort and Villiers
R717	Colesberg – Philippolis – Trompsburg – Edenburg – Reddersburg – Dewetsdorp
R719	Bultfontein – Wesselsbron – R30 between Bothaville and Odendaalsrus
R720	R70 near Senekal – Steynsrus – Edenville – Koppies – R721 near Vredefort
R721	Kroonstad – Vredefort
R722	Harrismith – Memel
R723	Parys – Heilbron
R724	Petrus Steyn – R76 near Bethlehem
R725	Lindley – Heilbron
R726	Zastron – Intersection of R392 and R393
R727	Bothaville – R76 between Viljoenskroon and Kroonstad
R730	R30 near Virginia – Virginia – Welkom – R34 near Odendaalsrus

== See also ==
- National routes (South Africa)#List of routes
- Provincial routes (South Africa)#List of routes
