= Samuel James Christelow =

Samuel James Christelow (3 December 1883 - 28 December 1971) was Archdeacon of Mashonaland from 1932 to 1945.

Upcher was educated at St Boniface Missionary College, Warminster and ordained deacon in 1909 and priest in 1911. After curacies in Bulawayo and Rusape he was Priest in charge of Selukwe then Hunyani. On his return from Zimbabwe (then called Rhodesia) he was Rector of Loxton from 1946 to 1956.
