= R361 road =

R361 road may refer to:

- R361 road (Ireland)
- R361 road (South Africa)
