= Moraea pritzeliana =

Scientific classification
- Kingdom: Plantae
- Clade: Tracheophytes
- Clade: Angiosperms
- Clade: Monocots
- Order: Asparagales
- Family: Iridaceae
- Genus: Moraea
- Species: M. pritzeliana

Binomial name
- Moraea pritzeliana Diels

Synonyms
- Gynandriris pritzeliana (Diels) Goldblatt; Gynandriris torta (L.Bolus) R.C.Foster; Helixyra torta (L.Bolus) Barnard; Moraea torta L.Bolus

Species of flowering plant

Moraea pritzeliana, commonly known in Afrikaans as kurktrekkeruintjie or corkscrew glasstulip in English, is a plant and geophyte belonging to the genus Moraea; it is part of the fynbos and the Succulent Karoo. The species is endemic to the Northern Cape and the Western Cape. It occurs in the Bokkeveld Mountains and from Loeriesfontein as far as the Klein Roggeveld Mountains.
