= R357 road =

R357 road may refer to:

- R357 road (Ireland)
- R357 road (South Africa)
