= R411 road =

R411 road may refer to:

- R411 road (Ireland)
- R411 road (South Africa)
