= R412 road =

R412 road may refer to:

- R412 road (Ireland)
- R412 (South Africa)
