= R356 road =

R356 road may refer to:

- R356 road (Ireland)
- R356 road (South Africa)
