= R349 (South Africa) =

Regional route in South Africa

Regional route R349
- R349 route map

Location
- Country: South Africa

Highway system
- Numbered routes of South Africa
← R347	→ R350

The R349 is a Regional Route in South Africa that runs from the N2 north-east of East London in the west to the coastal towns of Kei Mouth and Morgan's Bay. The route continues on the other side of the Kei Mouth Ferry past the R409 at Centani, past the R408 at Willowvale, past the R411 at Coffee Bay, ending at the R61 14 km west of Port St Johns.
