= R383 (South Africa) =

Regional route in South Africa

Regional route R383
- R383 route map

Location
- Country: South Africa

Highway system
- Numbered routes of South Africa
← R382	→ R384

The R383 is a Regional Route in South Africa that connects Kenhardt with the N8 between Groblershoop and Griekwastad. Its western origin is the R27 at Kenhardt. From there, it heads east to Putsonderwater. It then heads south-east to Marydale, where it intersects the N10. It then heads east to Westerburg. Here it crosses the Orange River to reach Koegas. From there it heads north-east to its terminus on the N8.
