= Bloukrans Pass (Northern Cape) =

Mountain pass in Eastern Cape, South Africa

Coordinates: 31°40′10″S 19°44′58″E

The Bloukrans Pass of the Tsitsikamma region, is located in Tsitsikamma National Park on the R355 road in the Eastern Cape province of South Africa. It navigates the lower slopes of the Bloukrans Mountain on its eastern shoulder, and has the Nuwewater se berg on its western side. The Bloukrans Mountain is the northern promontory of the Roggeveld Mountains. The name means "blue cliff" in Afrikaans and may refer to the nearby Bloukrans River.

The road through the pass was constructed by Thomas Charles John Bain in 1884. Its construction was made possible by the Great Fire of 1869, which made it possible for the first time to run a road through the formerly impenetrable Tsitsikamma Forest. It was incorporated into the national road system in the mid-20th century. It served as a major travel route from 1951 until 1984 when it was superseded by the N2 tollway.
