= Ouberg Pass =

Mountain pass in Eastern Cape, South Africa

Coordinates: 32°07′16.3″S 24°24′27.8″E

Ouberg Pass (alternatively Oude Berg Pass, in part to distinguish it from Ouberg Pass in the Western Cape) is situated in the Eastern Cape province of South Africa, on the regional road R63, between Graaff-Reinet and Murraysburg. The name comes from the Dutch oude berg ("old mountain"). The road over the pass was first constructed in 1829.
