= R350 (South Africa) =

Regional route in South Africa

Regional route R350
- R350 route map

Location
- Country: South Africa

Highway system
- Numbered routes of South Africa
← R349	→ R351

The R350 is a Regional Route in South Africa that connects Bedford and Grahamstown.

Its north-western origin is the R63 at Bedford. From there it heads south, before bending south-east. After about 75 kilometres, it meets the eastern origin of the R400 and shortly after the southern origin of the R344. It passes through Grahamstown, ending just south at the N2.
