= R355 (South Africa) =

Regional route in South Africa

Regional route R355
- R355 route map

Route information
- Length: 649 km (403 mi)

Major junctions
- North end: Kleinsee
- N7 / N14 in Springbok; R358 near Kliprand; R357 in Loeriesfontein; R27 in Calvinia; R356 near Ceres
- South end: R46 near Ceres

Location
- Country: South Africa

Highway system
- Numbered routes of South Africa
← R354	→ R356

The R355 is a Regional Route in South Africa that connects the R46 near Ceres with Kleinsee via Calvinia and Springbok.

== Route ==
The route starts in the town of Kleinsee, Northern Cape, heading eastwards. It reaches Springbok, where it meets the N7 and N14 before heading south-east. After 140 kilometres it reaches the R358. The routes are co-signed for a few kilometres heading south. They enter the Western Cape, passing through Kliprand. The R355 then emerges and heads east-south-east, returning to the Northern Cape, to meet the R357. The two routes become co-signed heading east, and enter Loeriesfontein together. From Loeriesfontein, the R355 diverges heading south, before veering east to reach Calvinia. At Calvinia, the route meets the R27 and the two routes become co-signed heading west. West of the town, the R355 diverges and heads south. It passes through the Bloukrans Pass and the Tankwa Karoo National Park to enter the Western Cape for the second time. The route continues south and meets the south-west origin of the R356 shortly before ending itself at the R46 between Ceres and Touws River.
