= R354 (South Africa) =

Regional route in South Africa

Regional route R354
- R354 route map

Route information
- Length: 254 km (158 mi)

Major junctions
- North end: R27 near Calvinia
- R356 in Sutherland, South Africa
- South end: N1 near Matjiesfontein

Location
- Country: South Africa

Highway system
- Numbered routes of South Africa
← R353	→ R355

The R354 is a Regional Route in South Africa that connects Matjiesfontein with Calvinia via Sutherland.

Its northern origin is the R27 east of Calvinia, Northern Cape. It heads generally south-east to Sutherland. At Sutherland it meets the R356 and is co-signed heading south-west. The two routes cross the Komsberg Range at the Rooikloof and Verlatekloof passes. After about 50 kilometres, the R354 diverges and heads south-east again, before veering south and entering the Western Cape to reach the N1 at Matjiesfontein.
