= R381 (South Africa) =

Regional route in South Africa

Regional route R381
- R381 route map

Route information
- Length: 112 km (70 mi)

Major junctions
- South end: N1 / N12 in Beaufort West
- R356 near Loxton
- North end: R63 in Loxton

Location
- Country: South Africa

Highway system
- Numbered routes of South Africa
← R380	→ R382

The R381 is a Regional Route in South Africa that connects Beaufort West in the south with Loxton in the north.

== Route ==
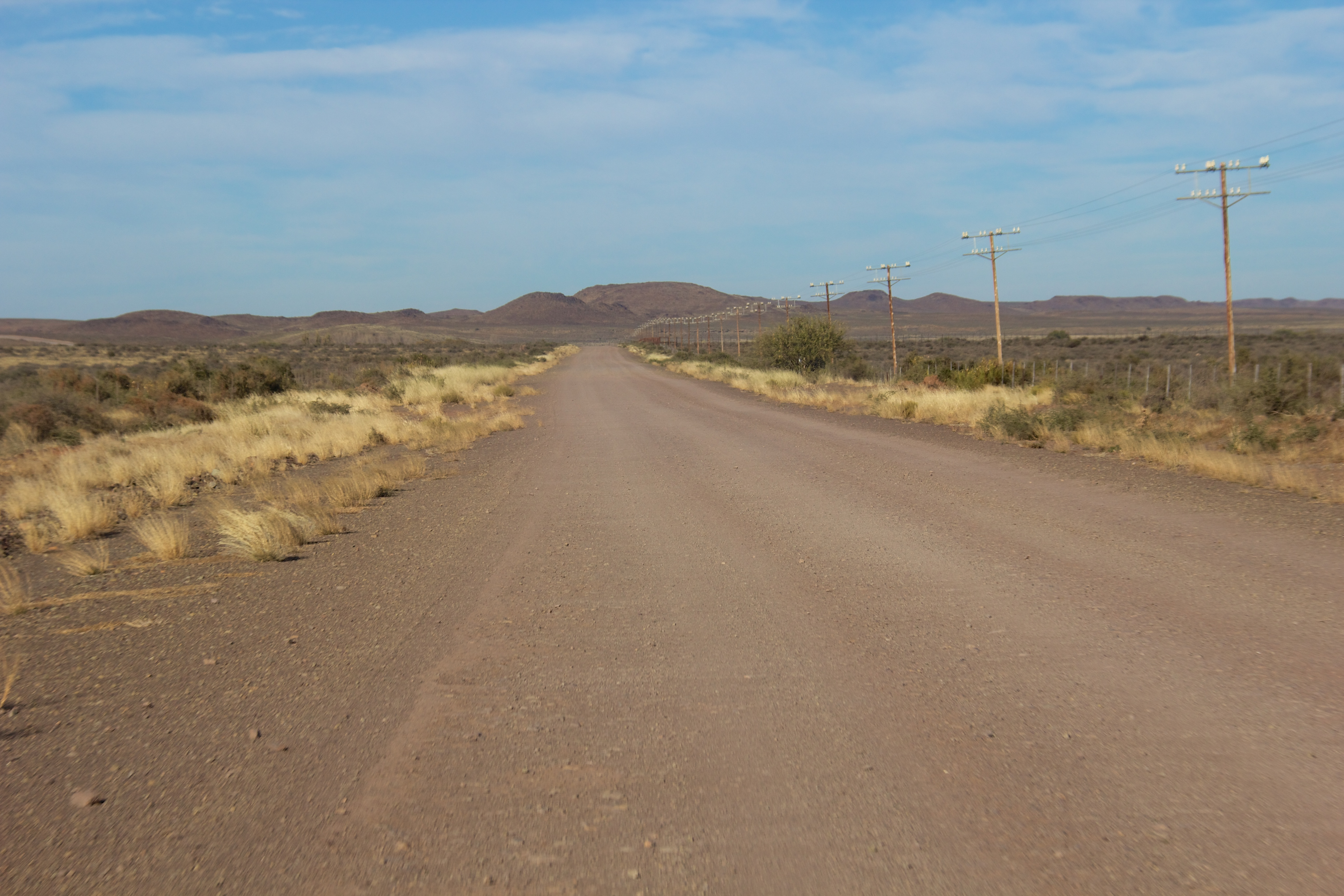
The R381 south of Loxton

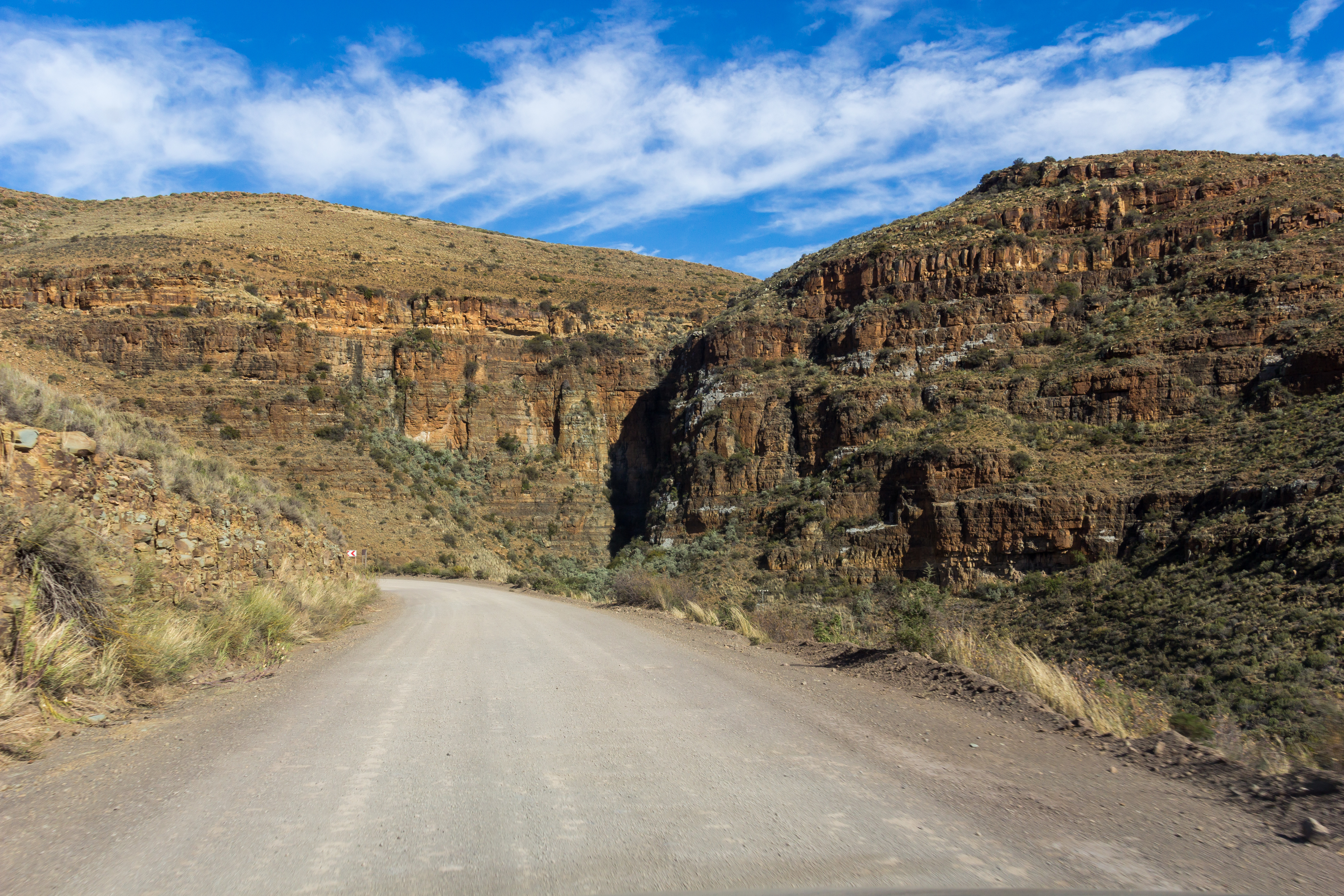
R381 pass

From Beaufort West, in the Western Cape, the route passes through the Rosesberg Pass to reach the Karoo National Park. It then enters the Molteno Pass through the Nuweveld Mountains. Just before reaching Loxton, the route crosses into the Northern Cape. It receives the eastern terminus of the R356 before ending in Loxton at a junction with the R63. The road is mostly untarred, with some tarred segments.
