= Wyllie's Poort =

Road pass in Limpopo, South Africa

Coordinates: 22°55′S 29°56′E

Wyllie's Poort is an N1 road pass in the Soutpansberg, in Limpopo province, South Africa, on the section between Louis Trichardt and Musina. It is named after Lieutenant C. H. Wylie, who surveyed the pass in 1904.
