= R308 (South Africa) =

Regional route in South Africa

Regional route R308
- R308 route map

Route information
- Length: 103 km (64 mi)

Major junctions
- Southwest end: R356 near Fraserburg
- Northeast end: R63 near Carnarvon

Location
- Country: South Africa

Highway system
- Numbered routes of South Africa
← R307	→ R309

The R308 is a Regional Route in South Africa that connects R356 near Fraserburg with Carnarvon.
