= R380 (South Africa) =

Regional route in South Africa

Regional route R380
- R380 route map

Route information
- Length: 196 km (122 mi)

Major junctions
- North end: McCarthy's Rest border with Botswana
- R31 in Hotazel
- South end: N14 in Kathu

Location
- Country: South Africa

Highway system
- Numbered routes of South Africa
← R378	→ R381

The R380 is a Regional Route in South Africa that connects Kathu with the Botswana border at McCarthy's Rest via Hotazel.

== Route ==
From the border, it heads generally south-south-east to Hotazel. Here it crosses the R31 at a staggered junction (co-signed for 16 kilometres). It then heads south, by-passing Dibeng to the east, before veering south-east to reach its southern terminus at a junction with the N14 at Kathu.
