= R356 (South Africa) =

Regional route in South Africa

Regional route R356
- R356 route map

Route information
- Length: 348 km (216 mi)

Major junctions
- South-west end: R355 near Ceres
- R354 near Sutherland; R353 in Fraserburg; R308 near Fraserburg
- North-east end: R381 near Loxton

Location
- Country: South Africa

Highway system
- Numbered routes of South Africa
← R355	→ R357

The R356 is a Regional Route in South Africa that connects the R46 near Ceres with Loxton by way of Sutherland and Fraserburg.

== Route ==
The route's south-western origin is a junction with the R355 near that route's origin at the R46 in the Western Cape. It heads north-east for 110 kilometres, crossing into the Northern Cape, before it reaches a junction with the R354 from the south. The two roads run together for 50 kilometres, through the Verlatekloof and Rooikloof Passes over the Komsberg Range, to reach Sutherland. The R354 leaves Sutherland heading north-west, but the R356 heads north-east to Fraserburg. The route crosses the R353 here at a staggered junction. It continues north-east, meeting the southern terminus of the R308, to end near Loxton at a junction with the R381.
