= Leeu-Gamka =

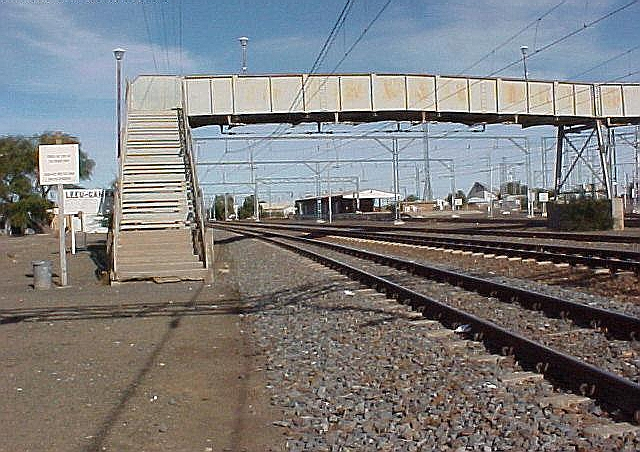
- Leeu-Gamka railway station

- Location within Western Cape Location within South Africa
- Coordinates: 32°46′25″S 21°58′49″E
- Country: South Africa
- Province: Western Cape
- District: Central Karoo
- Municipality: Prince Albert
- Established: 1879

Area
  - Total: 11.5 km^{2} (4.4 sq mi)
- Elevation: 552 m (1,811 ft)

Population (2011)
  - Total: 2,727
  - Density: 237/km^{2} (614/sq mi)

Racial makeup (2011)
  - Black African: 4.1%
  - Coloured: 91.3%
  - Indian/Asian: 1.0%
  - White: 2.3%
  - Other: 1.2%

First languages (2011)
  - Afrikaans: 94.9%
  - English: 2.5%
  - Xhosa: 1.2%
  - Other: 1.4%
- Time zone: UTC+2 (SAST)
- Postal code (street): 6950
- Area code: 023

Leeu-Gamka is a small town in the Western Cape province of South Africa, located 355 kilometres (221 mi) north-east of Cape Town in the Karoo.

== History ==
The town of Leeu-Gamka owes its existence to the route chosen by Prime Minister John Molteno for the Cape Government Railways's western main line, from Cape Town towards the diamond fields at Kimberley. The railway line reached the meeting-point of the Leeu and Gamka rivers in 1879, and on 11 August of that year a station was opened on that location. It was initially named "Fraserburg Road", because it was the closest station to the town of Fraserburg, 115 kilometres (71 mi) to the north-west over the Nuweveld Mountains.

A small town grew around this station, with a church and school opening in 1896, and a hotel in 1898. In 1950 the station and town were renamed to "Leeu-Gamka".

== Geography ==
Leeu-Gamka is located where the Leeu River enters the Gamka River; both rivers are intermittent in this region. "Leeu" and "Gamka" both mean "Lion", in Afrikaans and ǀXam respectively.

The town lies at an elevation of 552 m, in the southern Karoo; to the north are the Nuweveld Mountains, and to the south the Swartberge. It is situated on the N1 national road and the Cape Town–Kimberley railway, between Laingsburg and Beaufort West; the travel distance from Cape Town is 387 kilometres (240 mi) by road and 465 kilometres (289 mi) by rail. From Leeu-Gamka the R353 road runs north-west to Fraserburg and Williston.

== Demographics ==
The 2011 Census reported that, of the population of 2,727, some 91% described themselves as "Coloured" and 95% spoke Afrikaans.

== Government and Infrastructure ==
Leeu-Gamka falls within the Prince Albert Local Municipality, which is part of the Central Karoo District Municipality. It has a primary school and a police station, and was served by a mobile clinic.

Recently, Leeu-Gamka established a new emergency medical services station in conjunction with the Western Cape Provincial Health Department to render support services to accident victims on the N1 en route to Cape Town and Johannesburg. Furthermore, a permanent community health center was erected, doing away with the previously used mobile clinic. The community also has a library and a new dam for domestic water supply. Leeu Gamka is mainly a community surrounded by farms and many of the citizens are dependent on work from these farms, with maintenance work by civil contracting engineering companies who subcontract for SANRAL.
