= R357 (South Africa) =

Regional route in South Africa

Regional route R357
- R357 route map

Route information
- Length: 686 km (426 mi)

Major junctions
- South-west end: R27 in Nieuwoudtville
- R355 near Loeriesfontein; R27 at Brandvlei; R353 near Brandvlei; R361 in Vanwyksvlei; R386 near Prieska; N10 in Prieska; R313 in Prieska; R369 near Prieska; R385 in Douglas; R31 in Kimberley
- North-east end: N8 in Kimberley

Location
- Country: South Africa

Highway system
- Numbered routes of South Africa
← R356	→ R358

The R357 is a Regional Route in South Africa that connects Nieuwoudtville and Kimberley via Loeriesfontein and Prieska.

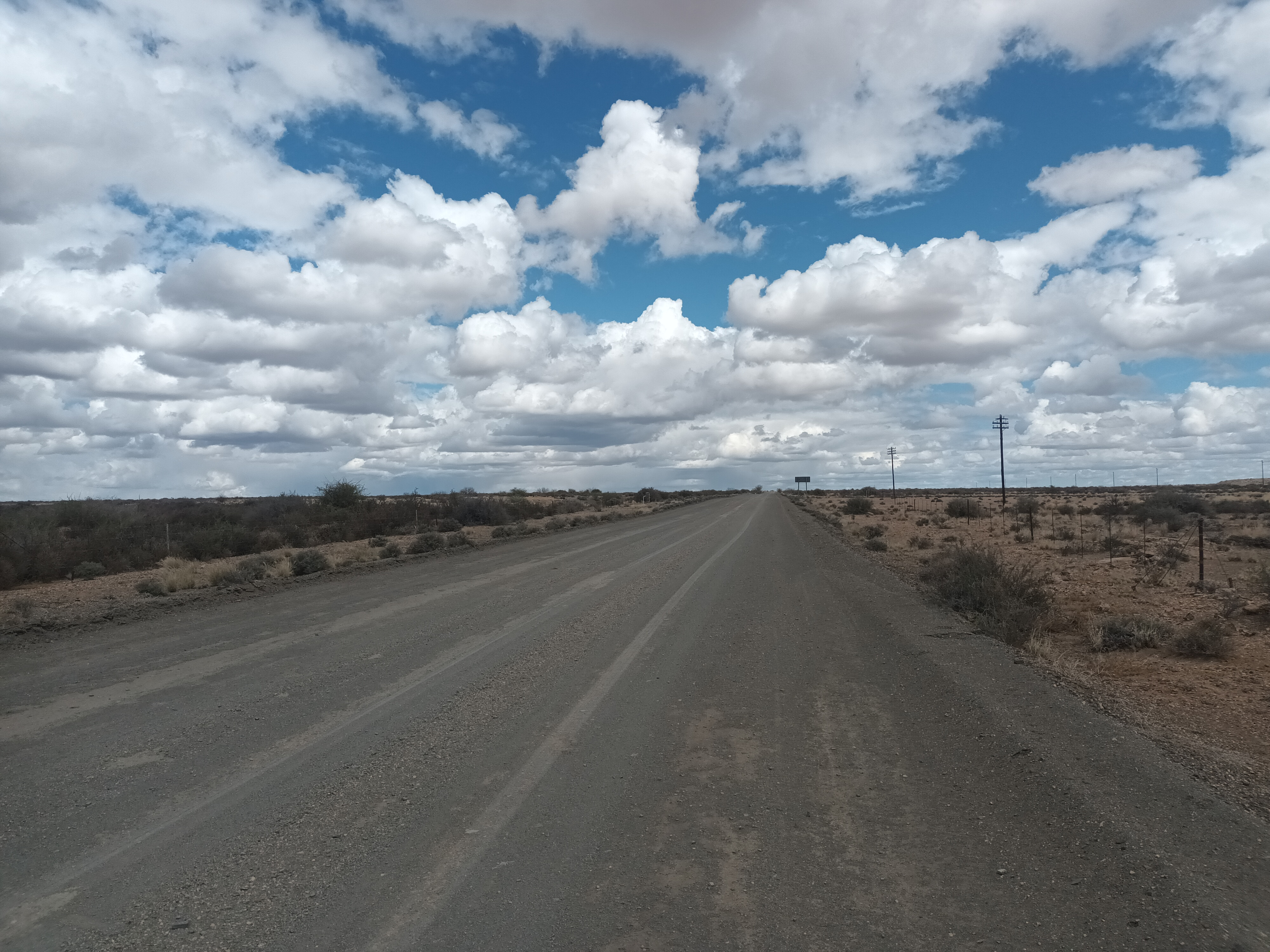

== Route ==
The route's south-western origin is the R27 at Nieuwoudtville. It heads north-east to reach the R355, with which it is co-signed for 10 kilometres. The routes reach Loeriesfontein, where they diverge. The R357 heads north-east again to reach Brandvlei. Here it again crosses the R27, at a staggered junction. East of the town, the route gives off the south-easterly R353, and heads east. It reaches Vanwyksvlei, where it meets the R361 and it joins the R361 to be co-signed to the north-east. The routes diverge just outside the town. The R357 continues east-north-east to Prieska. Just before the town, it meets the north-easterly R386 at its northern terminus. It then passes through Prieskapoort Pass and crosses the N10 to enter Prieska. It meets the R313 at its southern terminus and leaves the town heading east-north-east. After about 30 kilometres, it meets the western terminus of the R369. It continues for about another 100 kilometres to cross the Orange River and reach Douglas. At Douglas, it meets the R385 at a staggered junction (co-signed for 3.4 kilometres). From Douglas, it continues east-north-east for 100 kilometers to meet the R31 and end at the N8 in Kimberley.
