= N1 (South Africa) =

National road in South Africa

National route N1

- The N1 is indicated in red

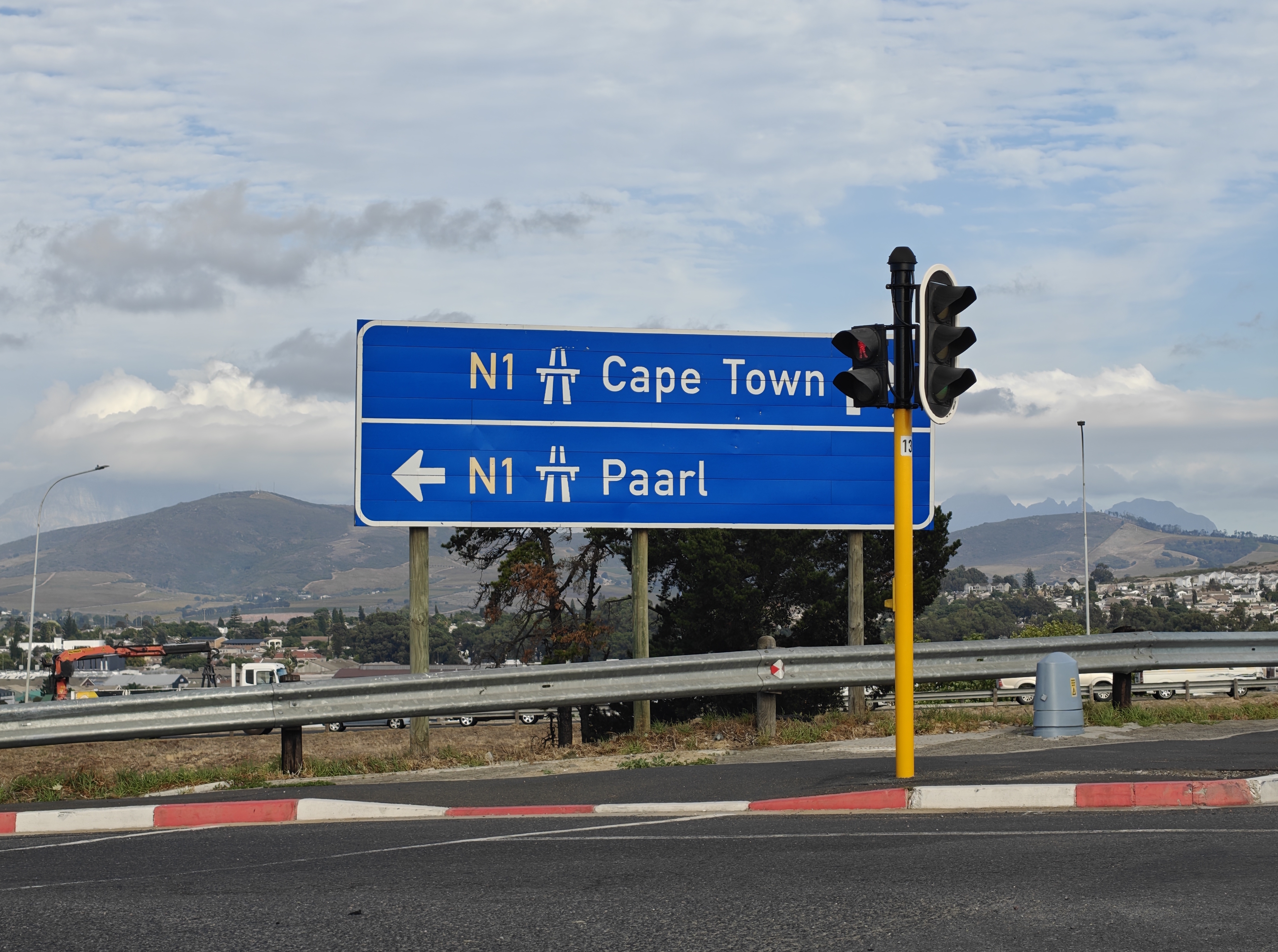
- N1 sign indicating southwest onramp to Cape Town and northeast onramp to Paarl

Route information
- Maintained by SANRAL, Bakwena, City of Cape Town Metropolitan Municipality, and Western Cape Provincial Government.
- Length: 1,936 km (1,203 mi)

Major junctions
- South end: M62 in Cape Town
- N2 in Cape Town; N7 in Cape Town; N12 near Beaufort West; N12 at Three Sisters; N10 at Hanover; N9 at Colesberg; N6 in Bloemfontein; N8 in Bloemfontein; N5 at Winburg; N12 near Soweto; N3 near Sandton; N14 in Centurion; N4 in Pretoria; N11 near Mokopane
- North end: A4A6 A4/A6 at the Zimbabwean border at Beit Bridge

Location
- Country: South Africa
- Provinces: Western Cape; Northern Cape; Free State; Gauteng; Limpopo
- Major cities: Cape Town; Paarl; Worcester; Laingsburg; Beaufort West; Colesberg; Bloemfontein; Kroonstad; Johannesburg; Pretoria; Bela-Bela; Modimolle; Mokopane; Polokwane; Louis Trichardt; Musina

Highway system
- Numbered routes of South Africa
| ← R730 | → N2 |

The N1 is a national route in South Africa that runs from Cape Town through Bloemfontein, Johannesburg, Pretoria and Polokwane to Beit Bridge on the border with Zimbabwe. It forms the first section of the famed Cape to Cairo Road.

Prior to 1970, the N1 designation was applied to the route from Beit Bridge to Colesberg and then along the current N9 to George. The section from Cape Town to Colesberg was designated the N9.

== Route ==
N1 route map

=== Western Cape ===
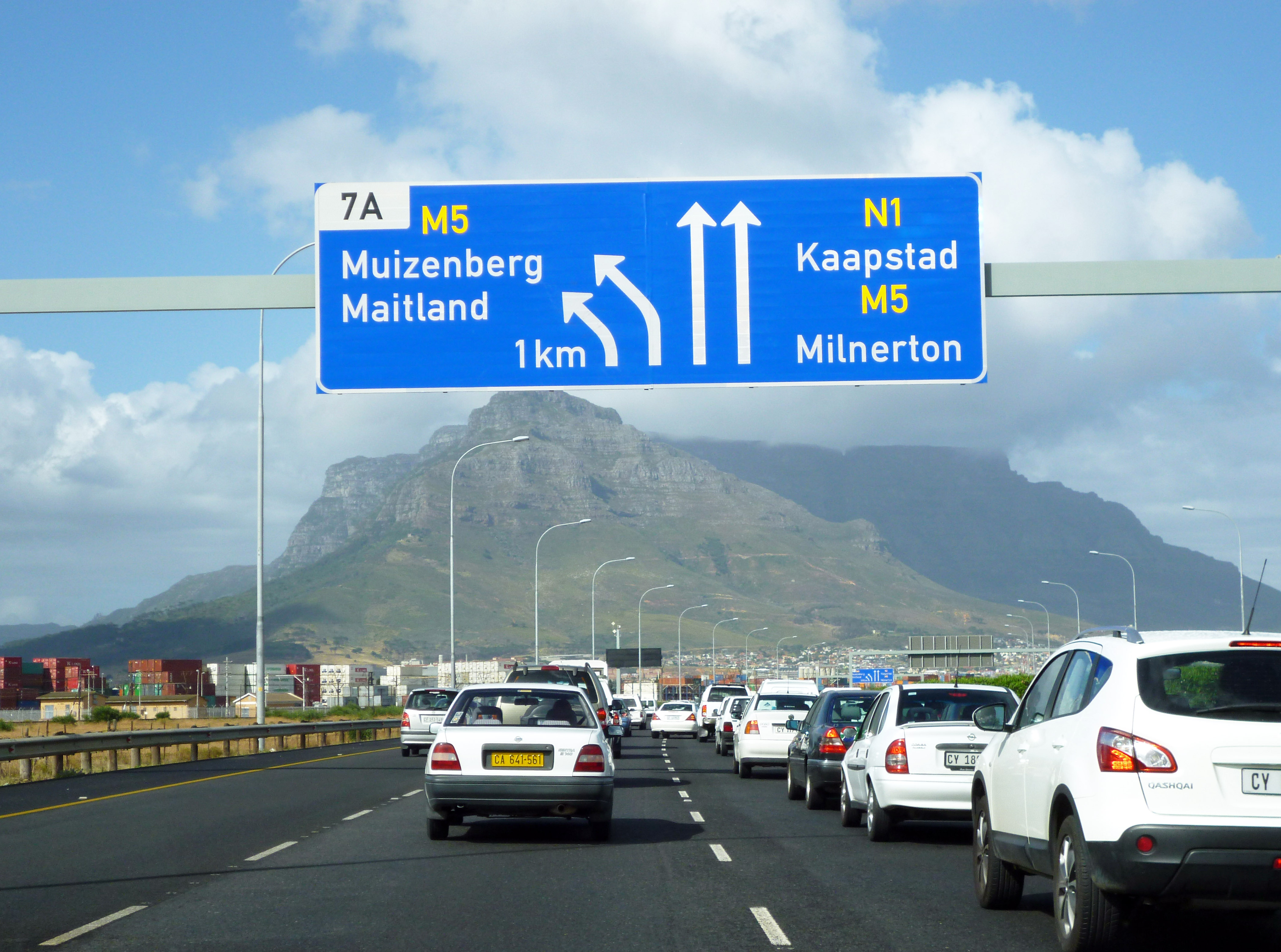
N1 freeway as it enters Cape Town

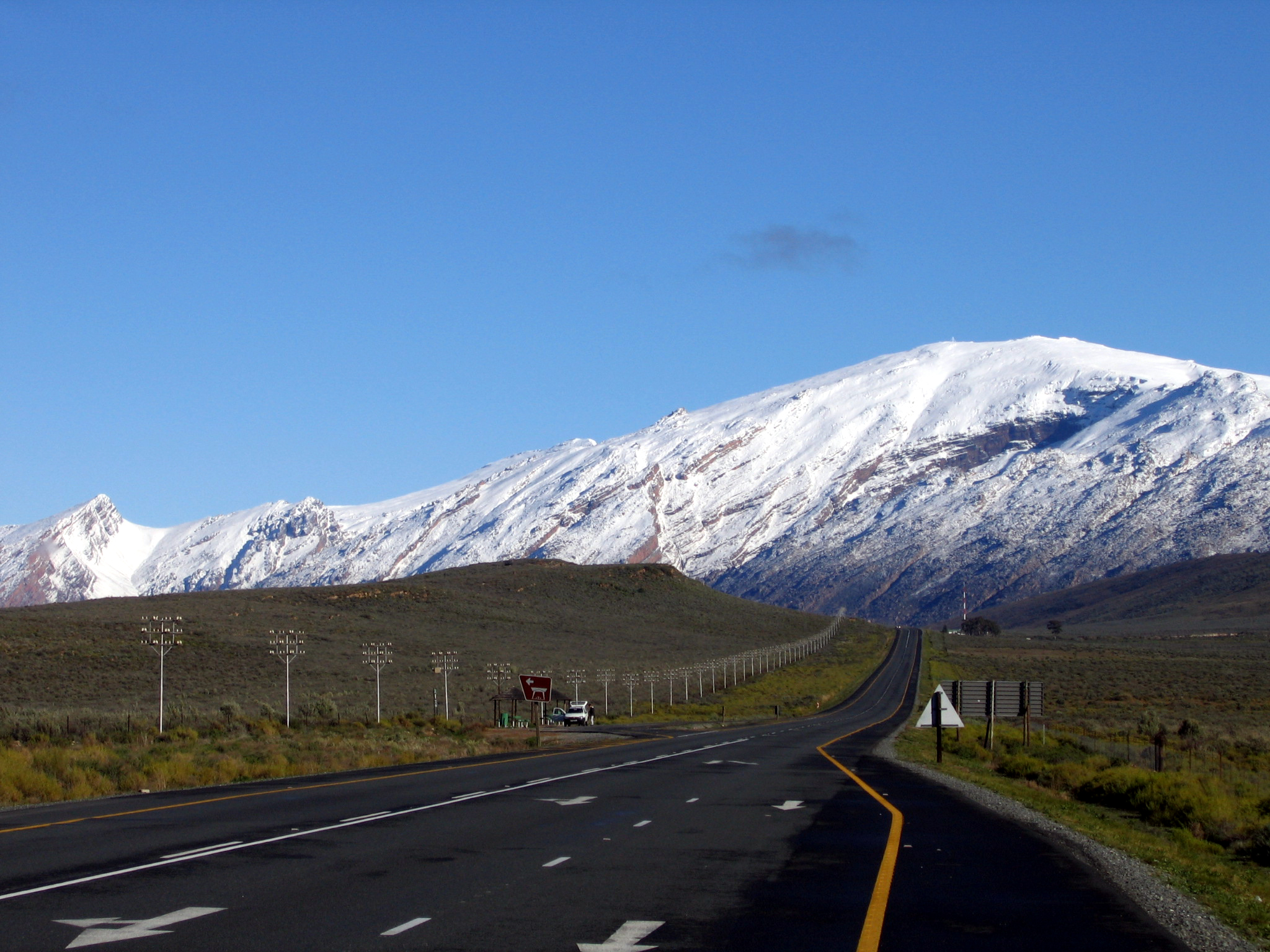
N1 near De Doorns atop Hex River Pass

A view over the terminus of the N1 in downtown Cape Town where both the N1 and N2 national highways merge into Nelson Mandela Boulevard (left) and its intersection with Walter Sisulu Avenue (right).

==== Within Cape Town ====
The N1 begins in central Cape Town at the northern end of Buitengracht Street (M62), outside the entrance to the Victoria & Alfred Waterfront. The first section of the N1 is shared with the beginning of the N2; it is a four-lane elevated freeway that runs along a strip of land between the city centre and the Port of Cape Town. On the eastern edge of the city centre the two roads split, and the N1 turns east as Table Bay Boulevard, passing the Ysterplaat Air Force Base and Century City before the N7 intersects it on its own way out of the city towards Namibia.

Major improvements have been made to the Koeberg Interchange, where the N1 meets the M5, one of the main arterial routes linking Milnerton with the Southern Suburbs. The N1 then heads through the suburbs of Goodwood and Bellville, where the R300 terminates at it, before heading towards Paarl.

Within the City of Cape Town the volume of two-way traffic ranges between 95,000 and 120,000 vehicles a day. During week days during peak traffic times (inbound towards the Cape Town city bowl in the morning and outbound in the afternoon) traffic jams extending up to 12 kilometers in length are common.

==== Rest of the province ====
At Paarl, the freeway ends, and the N1 is tolled as it passes through the Huguenot Tunnel running underneath the Du Toitskloof Mountains; the tunnel was opened in the late 1980s to replace the old Du Toitskloof Pass (now designated as part of the R101) running over the mountain. Traffic volumes through the tunnel range from an average of 12,000 vehicles daily with up to 22,500 vehicles using it daily in peak periods on holidays.

After emerging from the tunnel, the N1 winds through the Molenaar River Valley (which is a short dual carriageway section) before emerging from the valley and heading towards Worcester, bypassing Rawsonville. From Worcester, the route heads through the Hex River Valley, passing De Doorns and then enters the Karoo by ascending the Hex River Pass en route to Touws River.

Currently only the section of the N1 passing through the Huguenot Tunnel is tolled, although there were formerly plans to toll the N1 from the junction with the R300, roughly to De Doorns. This would have allowed for upgrading of the N1, most especially the opening and construction of the Northern Bore of the Huguenot Tunnel so that two lanes of traffic could pass in each direction through the tunnel, and the building of grade separated junctions along the N1 through Worcester. Although the town centre is bypassed, there are a number of traffic lights on the N1 through Worcester.

From the top of the pass, the N1 passes Touws River and Matjiesfontein before passing through Laingsburg, then heads towards Beaufort West, passing the towns of Prince Albert Road and Leeu-Gamka. The 200 km section between Laingsburg and Beaufort West is notorious for claiming many lives in fatigue-related accidents; also, the N1 begins to turn towards the north-east along this stretch of road. Just before Beaufort West, the N12 from George meets the N1; the N12 and the N1 routes are co-signed through Beaufort West and for the next 75 km north-east before splitting at Three Sisters. The N12 later meets the N1 again in Johannesburg, making the N12 an alternative route to the N1, passing through Kimberley as opposed to Bloemfontein. The N1 from Bloemfontein onwards is tolled while the N12 is toll-free. Whereas the N12 passes through most of the towns en route to Johannesburg, the N1 bypasses every town between Beaufort West and Johannesburg (avoiding town centres).

The N1 briefly crosses into the Northern Cape at Three Sisters for a few kilometres before crossing back into the Western Cape, and remains in the Western Cape until just after its intersection with the R63, where it re-enters the Northern Cape.

=== Northern Cape ===
The N1 has a short section in the Northern Cape. After re-entering the Northern Cape, it passes north-east past the town of Richmond before intersecting with the N10 at Hanover. The N1 then continues towards Colesberg, where it meets the northern terminus of the N9 just south-west of the town. Approximately 35 km after Colesberg, the N1 crosses the Orange River and enters the Free State.

=== Free State ===
After the Orange River crossing, the N1 makes a direct line for Bloemfontein, passing the towns of Springfontein, Trompsburg and Edenburg, heading in a more northerly direction. Upon entering Bloemfontein, the N1 meets the northern terminus of the N6 from East London. This intersection marks the beginning of the Bloemfontein Western Bypass, which is the first freeway section on the route since Paarl. The N8 from Kimberley in the west intersects with the N1 bypass, joining it for 3 km, before heading east through the Bloemfontein CBD and then to Maseru in Lesotho.

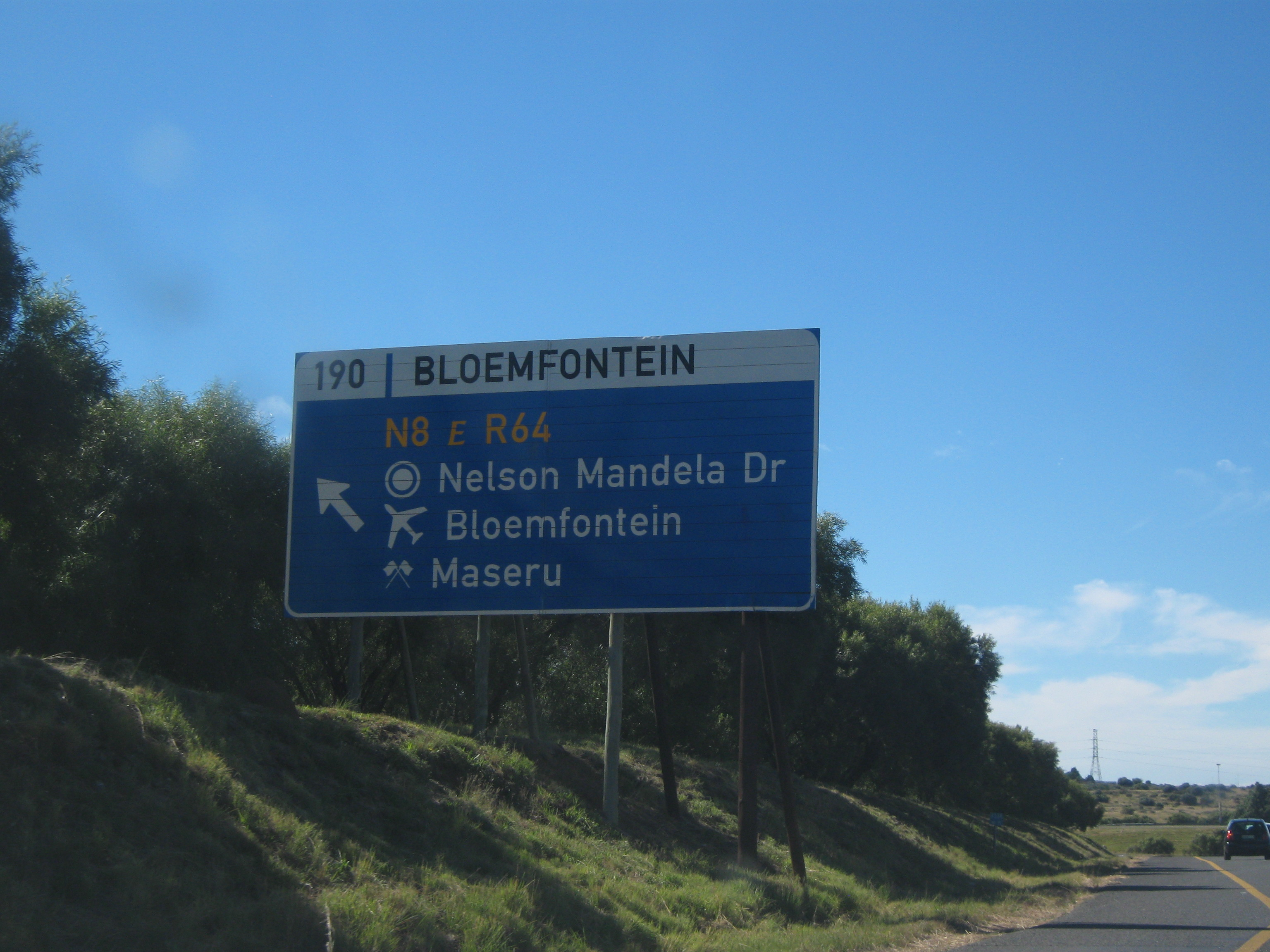
A road sign on the N1 in Bloemfontein between the two N8 interchanges

The N1 is designated as a toll road from the N6 interchange until its end at Beit Bridge. A few kilometres north of Bloemfontein, the N1 meets the R30 to Brandfort; the N1 continues as a single carriageway but with two lanes in each direction until 5 km before the toll plaza at Verkeerdevlei, halfway between Bloemfontein and Winburg. Initial plans were for the N1 from Bloemfontein to Winburg to be a dual-carriageway freeway. At Winburg, the N1 bypasses the town to the west and meets the western terminus of the N5, which connects with Senekal, Bethlehem and Harrismith.

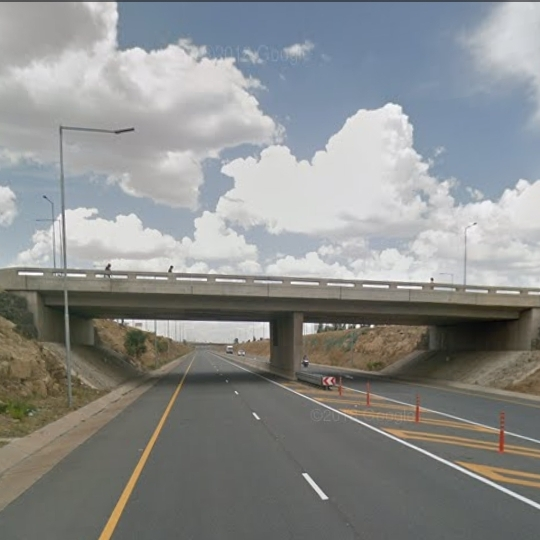
The N1 northbound as it enters Ventersburg (2015)

The N1 continues north and bypasses Ventersburg before reaching Kroonstad. There, the R34 from Welkom joins the N1 freeway for 9 kilometres, bypassing Kroonstad Central to the east, before splitting from the N1 and making its own way towards Heilbron.

After Kroonstad, the N1 heads towards the Vaal River and Gauteng as the Kroonvaal Toll Route. Just before passing into Gauteng at the Vaal River, the N1 features another toll plaza (the Vaal Toll Plaza) just south of its interchange with the R59 road, which provides access to the Vaal Triangle (Vereeniging and Sasolburg) in the east and Parys in the west.

=== Gauteng ===
After crossing the Vaal River, the N1 continues towards Johannesburg, bypassing Vanderbijlpark and featuring another toll plaza at Grasmere. At the Misgund Interchange in the southern outskirts of Johannesburg, the N12 once again meets the N1, and they are co-signed northwards as one highway for 4 kilometers (bypassing Soweto) up to the Diepkloof Interchange, where the N12 splits off eastwards to become the Southern Bypass portion of the Johannesburg Ring Road. From just north of the Vaal River the N1 changes from being a tarred road to a concrete road, until just after meeting the N12.

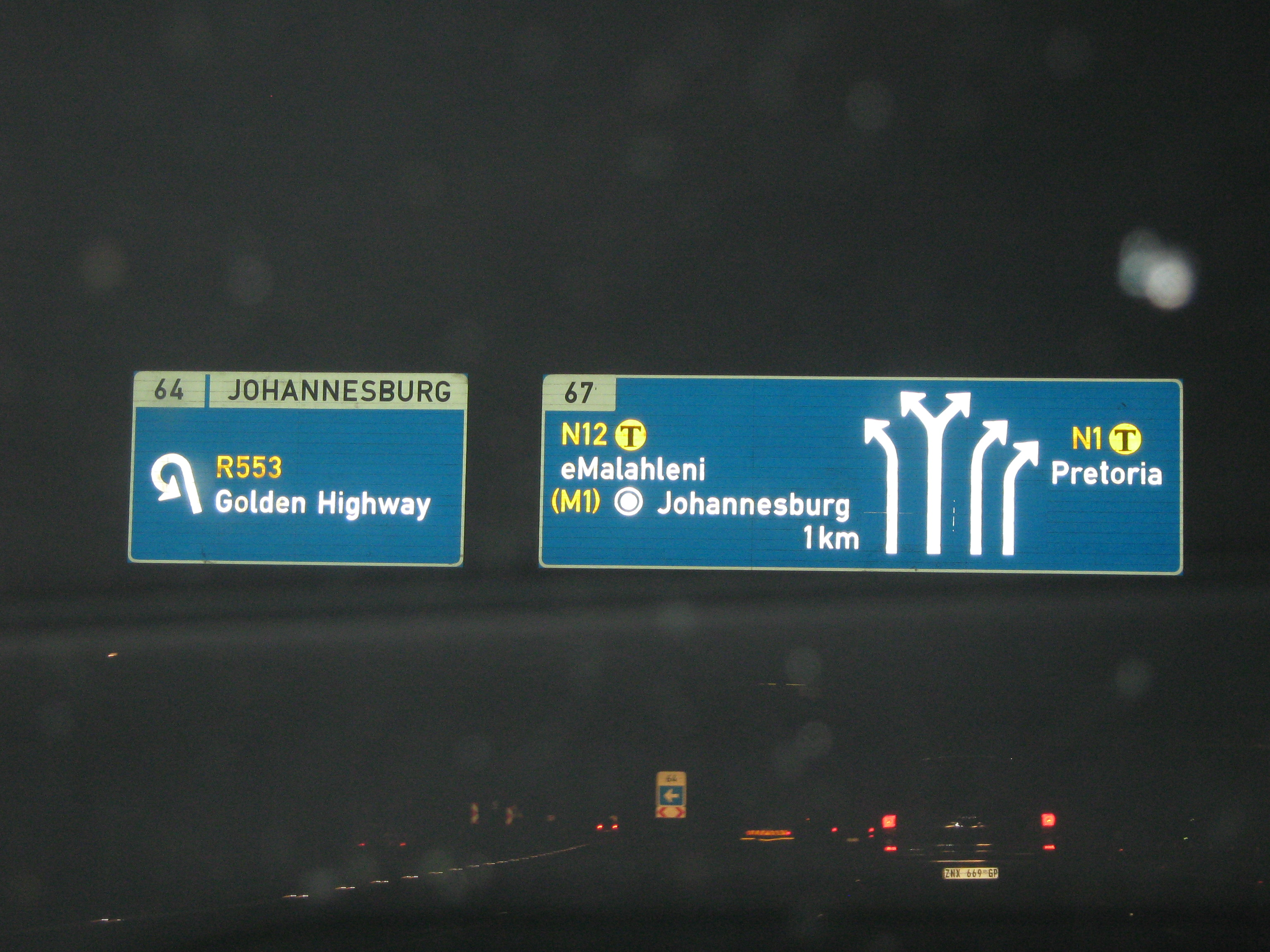
Road sign at the R553 Golden Highway off-ramp before the Diepkloof Interchange

The N1 then becomes the Western Bypass portion of the same ring road, passing through Johannesburg's western and north-western suburbs (forming Roodepoort's eastern boundary and passing through Randburg) before bending east and meeting the northern termini of the N3 (the Eastern Bypass portion of the Johannesburg Ring Road, which connects to Durban) and Johannesburg's own M1 freeway at the Buccleuch Interchange north-east of Sandton.

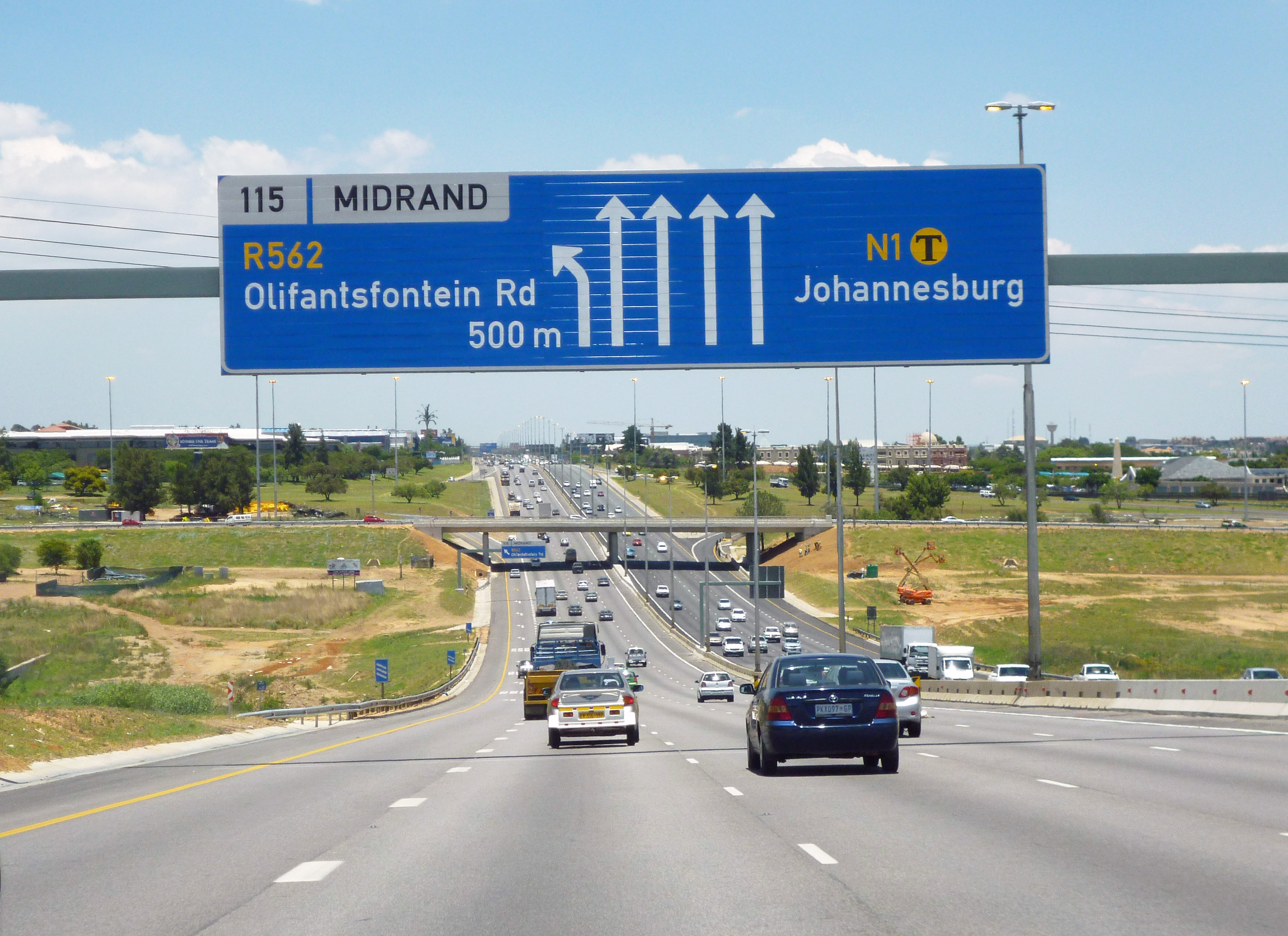
The N1 between Johannesburg and Pretoria as part of the Ben Schoeman Highway (2011).

The N1 then becomes the Ben Schoeman Highway, heading northwards towards Pretoria (passing through Midrand); this section carries 160,000 vehicles per day as of 2011 and is purported to be the busiest stretch of road in South Africa. At the Brakfontein Interchange in Centurion, the N1 meets the N14 and they switch highways, with the N14 becoming the Ben Schoeman Highway northwards to Pretoria Central and the N1 becoming the Pretoria Eastern Bypass (named the Danie Joubert Freeway) towards the north-east, proceeding to intersect with the R21 highway coming from O. R. Tambo International Airport at the Flying Saucer Interchange before Pretoria East. After the R21 interchange, the N1 proceeds in a more northerly direction through the eastern suburbs. East of Pretoria CBD, at the Proefplaas Interchange, the N4 national route from Witbank in the east joins the N1 and they are one highway for 12 km northwards before the N4 splits off to the west to become the Platinum Highway (Pretoria Northern Bypass) towards Brits and Rustenburg. At this interchange with the Platinum Highway (N4) is the Pumulani Toll Plaza on the N1 north and the Doornpoort Toll Plaza on the N4 west.

From the interchange with the N4 Platinum Highway, the N1 is tolled for the remainder of its length, with various toll plazas located along it (including upon off-ramps and on-ramps). The N1 heads to the north, bypassing Hammanskraal, and crosses into the Limpopo province.

=== Limpopo ===
The N1 then passes near Bela-Bela (previously Warmbaths) and Modimolle (previously Nylstroom). At the Modimolle exit, the freeway ends; the section of freeway between the Vaal River and Modimolle is the longest freeway in South Africa by route number at approximately 265 km (although there are two changes in the alignment of freeway in Gauteng, at the Buccleuch and Brakfontein Interchanges; South Africa's longest continuous freeway is the N3 between Durban and Ladysmith, which is approximately 20 km shorter). The section from the Proefplaas Interchange in Pretoria to the R516 Bela Bela exit is maintained by a private concessionaire, namely Bakwena, under license from SANRAL.

The N1 then heads past Mokopane (previously Potgietersrus), where the N11 intersects it at the Nyl Toll Plaza (north off-ramp only) (leaving the N18 and the N17 as the only national roads that do not intersect with the N1), before heading to Polokwane (previously known as Pietersburg). The Polokwane Eastern Bypass is now used by traffic to loop around the Polokwane city centre (the N1 is no-longer the road passing through the city centre).

After Polokwane, the N1 heads north, crossing the Tropic of Capricorn before passing Louis Trichardt. The N1 then winds through the Soutpansberg Mountains (containing two short tunnels) as the Wyllie's Poort Pass before heading to Musina (passing the last tollgate before Musina). The Musina Western Bypass is now used by traffic to bypass the CBD to the west (The N1 is no-longer the road passing through the town centre). The route then continues for 12 km to end at the Beitbridge border crossing with Zimbabwe on the Limpopo River, where it crosses the river as the Alfred Beit Road Bridge before splitting into two routes, which are the A4 road to Harare and the A6 road to Bulawayo. The border town on the other side of the Limpopo River is also called Beitbridge.

== Junctions ==
List of Coordinates

| What | Where | Coordinates |
|---|---|---|
| Southwest end | in Cape Town | 33°54′52″S 18°25′26″E |
| N2 junction | in Cape Town | 33°55′12″S 18°26′07″E |
| N7 junction | in Cape Town | 33°53′07″S 18°31′53″E |
| N12 junction | near Beaufort West | 32°22′36″S 22°31′37″E |
| N12 junction | at Three Sisters | 31°53′04″S 23°04′58″E |
| N10 junction | at Hanover | 31°04′32″S 24°25′56″E |
| N9 junction | at Colesberg | 30°44′00″S 25°05′07″E |
| N6 junction | near Bloemfontein | 29°12′04″S 26°11′28″E |
| N8 junction | near Bloemfontein | 29°07′37″S 26°09′49″E |
| N5 junction | at Winburg | 28°29′57″S 26°59′50″E |
| N12 junction | near Soweto | 26°15′37″S 27°57′51″E |
| N3 junction | near Sandton | 26°02′48″S 28°05′46″E |
| N14 junction | in Centurion | 25°52′41″S 28°10′08″E |
| N4 junction | near Pretoria | 25°44′25″S 28°15′53″E |
| N11 junction | near Mokopane | 24°17′13″S 28°58′53″E |
| Northeast end | at Beit Bridge | 22°13′28″S 29°59′12″E |

=== Western Cape ===
| Municipality | Location | km | mi | Exit | Destinations | Notes |
|---|---|---|---|---|---|---|
| Cape Town | Cape Town CBD | 0 | 0 | — | M62 Buitengracht Street, Walter Sisulu Avenue | At-grade intersection |
| Cape Town | Cape Town CBD | 0 | 0 | — | CTICC P1 Parking | No westbound entrance |
| Cape Town | Cape Town CBD | 0 | 0 | — | N2 Nelson Mandela Boulevard, Cape Town International | Eastbound exit only |
| Cape Town | Cape Town CBD | 0 | 0 | 1 | M60 Christiaan Barnard Street, CTICC, Cape Town | Westbound exit, eastbound entrance |
| Cape Town | Woodstock | 0 | 0 | 3 | M176 Lower Church Street | |
| Cape Town | Paarden Eiland | 0 | 0 | 4 | R27 Marine Drive, Milnerton, Table View | |
| Cape Town | Brooklyn | 0 | 0 | 7A | M5 Black River Parkway, Muizenberg, Maitland | |
| Cape Town | Brooklyn | 0 | 0 | 7B | M5 Koeberg Road, Section Street, Milnerton | |
| Cape Town | Century City | 0 | 0 | 10 | Sable Road | |
| Cape Town | Century City | 0 | 0 | — | Century City Drive | Eastbound exit and entrance |
| Cape Town | Summer Greens | 0 | 0 | 13A | N7 north, Malmesbury | |
| Cape Town | Summer Greens | 0 | 0 | 13B | N7 south, M7 Jakes Gerwel Drive, Goodwood | |
| Cape Town | Monte Vista | 0 | 0 | 15 | M26 Monte Vista Boulevard | |
| Cape Town | Parow | 0 | 0 | 16 | M12 Giel Basson Drive, Cape Town International | Westbound exit, eastbound entrance |
| Cape Town | Parow | 0 | 0 | 18 | M14 McIntyre Road, Plattekloof Road | |
| Cape Town | Bellville | 0 | 0 | 20 | M16 Mike Pienaar Boulevard, Jip de Jager Avenue | |
| Cape Town | Bellville | 0 | 0 | 23 | R302 Durban Road, W van Schoor Avenue | |
| Cape Town | Bellville | 0 | 0 | 25 | M31 Old Oak Road | No westbound exit |
| Cape Town | Brackenfell | 0 | 0 | 27 | R300 Kuils River Road, Mitchells Plain | |
| Cape Town | Brackenfell | 0 | 0 | 28 | M100 Brackenfell Boulevard | Westbound exit, eastbound entrance |
| Cape Town | Brackenfell | 0 | 0 | 29 | M137 Okavango Road | |
| Cape Town | Kraaifontein | 0 | 0 | 32 | M15 Brighton Road, Van Riebeeck Road | |
| Cape Town | Kraaifontein | 0 | 0 | 34 | M167 Maroela Road, Lucullus Street, Kraaifontein Industria | |
| Stellenbosch | Cape Winelands | 0 | 0 | 39 | R304, Klipheuwel, Stellenbosch | |
| Stellenbosch | Klapmuts | 0 | 0 | 47 | R44, R101, Stellenbosch, Klapmuts, Wellington | |
| Drakenstein | Paarl | 0 | 0 | 55 | R45, R101 Main Road, Franschhoek | |
| Drakenstein | Paarl | 0 | 0 | 57 | Cecilia Street, R45, R101 | Eastbound exit, westbound entrance |
| Drakenstein | Paarl | 0 | 0 | 59 | R301 Jan Van Riebeeck Drive, Wellington | |
| Drakenstein | Paarl | 0 | 0 | 62A | Sonstraal Road, R101 Langenhoven Avenue, Worcester | Signed as exit 62 westbound |
| Drakenstein | Paarl | 0 | 0 | 62B | R101 Langenhoven Avenue | Eastbound exit only; Truck exit before tunnel |
| Drakenstein | Paarl | 0 | 0 | SANRAL Huguenot Toll Plaza; Huguenot Tunnel | | |
| Drakenstein | Du Toitskloof Pass | 0 | 0 | 72 | R101, Paarl | Westbound exit, eastbound entrance; Western end of concurrency with R101 |
| Breede Valley | Rawsonville | 0 | 0 | — | R101 Old N1 Road east, Rawsonville | At-grade intersection; Eastern end of concurrency with R101 |
| Breede Valley | Rawsonville | 0 | 0 | — | R101 Old N1 Road west, Rawsonville | At-grade intersection |
| Breede Valley | Worcester | 0 | 0 | — | R43, Ceres | At-grade intersection; Western end of concurrency with R43 |
| Breede Valley | Worcester | 0 | 0 | 108 | R43, Worcester | Eastern end of concurrency with R43 |
| Breede Valley | Worcester | 0 | 0 | — | R60, Worcester, Robertson | At-grade intersection |
| Breede Valley | Touws River | 0 | 0 | — | R318, Montagu | At-grade intersection |
| Breede Valley | Touws River | 0 | 0 | — | R46, Ceres | At-grade intersection |
| Laingsburg | Matjiesfontein | 0 | 0 | — | R354, Sutherland, Matjiesfontein | At-grade intersection |
| Laingsburg | Laingsburg | 0 | 0 | — | R323 Van Riebeeck Street, Ladismith | At-grade intersection |
| Prince Albert | Prince Albert | 0 | 0 | — | R407, Prince Albert | At-grade intersection |
| Prince Albert | Prince Albert | 0 | 0 | — | R353, Prince Albert | At-grade intersection; Western end of concurrency with R353 |
| Prince Albert | Leeu-Gamka | 0 | 0 | — | R353, Fraserburg, Leeu-Gamka | At-grade intersection; Eastern end of concurrency with R353 |
| Beaufort West | Beaufort West | 0 | 0 | — | N12, Oudtshoorn | At-grade intersection; Western end of concurrency with N12 |
| Beaufort West | Beaufort West | 0 | 0 | — | R61 Voortrekker Street, Beaufort West, Aberdeen | At-grade intersection |
| Beaufort West | Beaufort West | 0 | 0 | — | R381, Loxton | At-grade intersection |
| Ubuntu (Northern Cape) | Three Sisters | 0 | 0 | — | N12, Victoria West | At-grade intersection; Eastern end of concurrency with N12; Formerly exit 538 |
| Beaufort West | Murraysburg | 0 | 0 | — | R63, Murraysburg | At-grade intersection; Formerly exit 580 |
N1 continues into the Northern Cape

=== Northern Cape ===
| Municipality | Location | km | mi | Exit | Destinations | Notes |
|---|---|---|---|---|---|---|
| Ubuntu | Richmond | 0 | 0 | — | R388, Richmond, R398, Merriman | At-grade intersection; Western end of concurrency with R398 |
| Ubuntu | Richmond | 0 | 0 | — | R398, Middelburg | At-grade intersection; Eastern end of concurrency with R398 |
| Emthanjeni | Hanover | 0 | 0 | — | N10, Middelburg, De Aar | Quadrant interchange |
| Emthanjeni | Hanover | 0 | 0 | — | R389, Philipstown | At-grade intersection; Western end of concurrency with R389 |
| Emthanjeni | Hanover | 0 | 0 | — | R389, Noupoort | At-grade intersection; Eastern end of concurrency with R389 |
| Umsobomvu | Colesberg | 0 | 0 | 795A | N9, Sluiters Street, Colesberg | Signed as exit 795 eastbound |
| Umsobomvu | Colesberg | 0 | 0 | 795B | N9, Noupoort | Westbound exit, eastbound entrance |
| Umsobomvu | Colesberg | 0 | 0 | 798 | R717, Philippolis, R58, Venterstad, R369, Petrusville | |
N1 continues into the Free State

=== Free State ===
| Municipality | Location | km | mi | Exit | Destinations | Notes |
|---|---|---|---|---|---|---|
| Kopanong | Gariep Dam | 0 | 0 | 8 | R701, Gariep Dam, Bethulie | |
| Kopanong | Gariep Dam | 0 | 0 | 21 | Ruigtevlei, Driekuil | |
| Kopanong | Springfontein | 0 | 0 | — | R715, Springfontein, Bethulie | At-grade intersection |
| Kopanong | Trompsburg | 0 | 0 | 75 | R704, Trompsburg, Smithfield | |
| Kopanong | Trompsburg | 0 | 0 | 84 | Stofkraal, Kruger | |
| Kopanong | Edenburg | 0 | 0 | 105 | Courland, Meadows | |
| Kopanong | Edenburg | 0 | 0 | 113 | R717, Edenburg, Reddersburg | |
| Kopanong | Reddersburg | 0 | 0 | 128 | Wurasoord, Reddersburg | |
| Kopanong | Reddersburg | 0 | 0 | 148 | Sophiasdal, Tierpoort | |
| Mangaung | Bloemfontein | 0 | 0 | 153 | Koppieskraal, Riversford | |
| Mangaung | Bloemfontein | 0 | 0 | 167 | Onze Rust, Kaalspruit | |
| Mangaung | Bloemfontein | 0 | 0 | 177 | N6, M30 Oliver Tambo Road, Mangaung | |
| Mangaung | Bloemfontein | 0 | 0 | 181 | R706 Curie Avenue, Jagersfontein | |
| Mangaung | Bloemfontein | 0 | 0 | 186 | N8 west, M19 Walter Sisulu Road | Southern end of concurrency with N8 |
| Mangaung | Bloemfontein | 0 | 0 | 190 | N8 east, R64 Nelson Mandela Drive, Bram Fischer International | Northern end of concurrency with N8 |
| Mangaung | Bloemfontein | 0 | 0 | 198 | R700 Kenneth Kaunda Road, Bultfontein | |
| Mangaung | Bloemfontein | 0 | 0 | 202 | M30 Raymond Mhlaba Street, Mangaung, Bram Fischer International | Westbound exit, eastbound entrance |
| Mangaung | Bloemfontein | 0 | 0 | 205 | Avenham, Floradale | |
| Mangaung | Bloemfontein | 0 | 0 | 208 | R30, Brandfort | Eastbound exit, westbound entrance |
| Mangaung | Bloemfontein | 0 | 0 | 213 | Maselspoort, Glen | |
| Masilonyana | Brandfort | 0 | 0 | 222 | Witfontein, Welgegund | |
| Masilonyana | Brandfort | 0 | 0 | SANRAL Verkeerdevlei Toll Plaza | | |
| Masilonyana | Brandfort | 0 | 0 | 255 | R703, Verkeerdevlei, Excelsior, Brandfort | At-grade intersection |
| Masilonyana | Winburg | 0 | 0 | 293 | Winburg, Excelsior, Brandfort | |
| Masilonyana | Winburg | 0 | 0 | 298 | N5, R708, Senekal, Theunissen | |
| Masilonyana | Winburg | 0 | 0 | — | R73, Virginia | At-grade intersection |
| Matjhabeng | Ventersburg | 0 | 0 | 346 | Pienaar Street, Ventersburg | Eastbound exit, westbound entrance |
| Matjhabeng | Ventersburg | 0 | 0 | 347 | R70, Ventersburg, Hennenman, Senekal | Westbound exit, eastbound entrance |
| Moqhaka | Kroonstad | 0 | 0 | 371 | Wonderkop, Holfontein | |
| Moqhaka | Kroonstad | 0 | 0 | 393 | R34, Odendaalsrus, Welkom | No westbound entrance; Southern end of concurrency with R34 |
| Moqhaka | Kroonstad | 0 | 0 | 394A | R76 South Road north, Kroonstad | Signed as exit 394 westbound |
| Moqhaka | Kroonstad | 0 | 0 | 394B | R76 South Road south, Bethlehem | Eastbound exit only |
| Moqhaka | Kroonstad | 0 | 0 | 398 | Reitz Street, Kroonstad Central, Doornkloof, Kroonstad Airport | |
| Moqhaka | Kroonstad | 0 | 0 | 402 | R721, R34 North Road, Vredefort, Heilbron | Northern end of concurrency with R34 |
| Ngwathe | Edenville | 0 | 0 | 426 | Heuningspruit, Fraaiuitzicht | |
| Ngwathe | Koppies | 0 | 0 | 446 | Rooiwal, Vredefort | |
| Ngwathe | Koppies | 0 | 0 | 458 | R720, Koppies, Vredefort | |
| Ngwathe | Vredefort | 0 | 0 | 472 | R723, Heilbron, Vredefort | |
| Ngwathe | Parys | 0 | 0 | SANRAL Vaal Toll Plaza | | |
| Ngwathe | Parys | 0 | 0 | 498 | R59, Sasolburg, Parys | |
N1 continues into Gauteng

=== Gauteng ===
| Municipality | Location | km | mi | Exit | Destinations | Notes |
|---|---|---|---|---|---|---|
| Emfuleni | Vanderbijlpark | 0 | 0 | 3 | R42, Vanderbijlpark, Vereeniging | Northbound exit, southbound entrance |
| Emfuleni | Vanderbijlpark | 0 | 0 | 9 | Potchefstroom Road, Vanderbijlpark, Potchefstroom | |
| Emfuleni | Vanderbijlpark | 0 | 0 | 20 | R57, Vanderbijlpark, Sasolburg, Vereeniging | Southbound exit, northbound entrance |
| Emfuleni | Sebokeng | 0 | 0 | 31 | R28 Randfontein Road, Sebokeng, Randfontein | |
| Johannesburg | Ennerdale | 0 | 0 | 46 | R558 Ennerdale Road, Walkerville, Ennerdale | Tolled exit |
| Johannesburg | Ennerdale | 0 | 0 | SANRAL Grasmere Toll Plaza | | |
| Johannesburg | Soweto | 0 | 0 | 60 | N12 Moroka Bypass, Potchefstroom, Kimberley | Southbound exit, northbound entrance; Southern end of concurrency with N12 |
| Johannesburg | Soweto | 0 | 0 | 64 | R553 Golden Highway, Soweto, Johannesburg South | |
| Johannesburg | Diepkloof | 0 | 0 | 67 | N12 Southern Bypass, M79 Rand Show Road, O. R. Tambo International, eMalahleni | Northern end of concurrency with N12 |
| Johannesburg | Diepkloof | 0 | 0 | 69 | M70 Soweto Highway, Diepkloof, Nasrec | Northbound exit only |
| Johannesburg | Diepkloof | 0 | 0 | 71 | N17, Soweto, Nasrec | Southbound exit only |
| Johannesburg | Roodepoort | 0 | 0 | 75 | R24 Albertina Sisulu Road, Bosmont, Roodepoort | |
| Johannesburg | Roodepoort | 0 | 0 | 78 | Gordon Road, Florida | |
| Johannesburg | Roodepoort | 0 | 0 | 80 | M8 14th Avenue, Northcliff | |
| Johannesburg | Randburg | 0 | 0 | 85 | M5 Beyers Naude Drive, Honeydew, Northcliff | |
| Johannesburg | Randburg | 0 | 0 | 90 | R512 Malibongwe Drive, Lanseria International, Strydompark | |
| Johannesburg | Sandton | 0 | 0 | 95 | R511 Winnie Mandela Drive, Fourways, Bryanston | |
| Johannesburg | Sandton | 0 | 0 | 100 | R564 Witkoppen Road, M9 Rivonia Road, Fourways, Sunninghill | |
| Johannesburg | Sandton | 0 | 0 | 104A | Continue on N1, Roodepoort, Pretoria | Signed as exit 104 southbound |
| Johannesburg | Sandton | 0 | 0 | 104B | M1 Ben Schoeman Freeway, Johannesburg, N3 Eastern Bypass, Germiston | Signed as exit 104 southbound |
| Johannesburg | Midrand | 0 | 0 | 108 | M39 Allandale Road, Grand Central Airport, Kyalami, Kempton Park | |
| Johannesburg | Midrand | 0 | 0 | 111 | M71 New Road, Crowthorne, Grand Central Airport | |
| Johannesburg | Midrand | 0 | 0 | 115 | R562 Olifantsfontein Road, Noordwyk | |
| Tshwane | Centurion | 0 | 0 | 118A | M36 Samrand Road, Kosmosdal | |
| Tshwane | Centurion | 0 | 0 | 118B | Ultra City Service Area | |
| Tshwane | Centurion | 0 | 0 | 121A | R101 Old Johannesburg Road north, Rooihuiskraal | Signed as Exit 121B southbound |
| Tshwane | Centurion | 0 | 0 | 121B | R101 Old Johannesburg Road south, Brakfontein Road, Midrand | Signed as Exit 121A southbound |
| Tshwane | Centurion | 0 | 0 | 124A | Continue on N1, Johannesburg | Signed as exit 124 northbound |
| Tshwane | Centurion | 0 | 0 | 124B | N14, Pretoria, Krugersdorp | Signed as exit 124 northbound |
| Tshwane | Centurion | 0 | 0 | 128 | M19 John Vorster Drive, Witch-Hazel Avenue, Highveld | |
| Tshwane | Centurion | 0 | 0 | 130 | M18 Botha Avenue, Irene, Lyttelton | |
| Tshwane | Centurion | 0 | 0 | 134 | R21, Kempton Park, O. R. Tambo International, Pretoria | |
| Tshwane | Pretoria | 0 | 0 | 136 | R50 Rigel Avenue, M9, Delmas, Erasmusrand | |
| Tshwane | Pretoria | 0 | 0 | 139 | M30 Garsfontein Road, Waterkloof, Brooklyn | Northbound exit only |
| Tshwane | Pretoria | 0 | 0 | 140 | M11 Atterbury Road, Menlo Park, Menlyn | |
| Tshwane | Pretoria | 0 | 0 | 141 | M6 Lynnwood Road, Mering Naude Road, Lynnwood | |
| Tshwane | Pretoria | 0 | 0 | 145 | M2, Pretoria, N4, eMalahleni | Southern end of concurrency with N4 |
| Tshwane | Pretoria | 0 | 0 | 148 | M8 Stormvoël Road, Mamelodi, Gezina | Tolled northbound exit and southbound entrance |
| Tshwane | Pretoria | 0 | 0 | 152 | R513 Sefako Makgatho Drive, Cullinan, Pretoria North | Tolled northbound exit and southbound entrance; Diverging diamond interchange |
| Tshwane | Pretoria | 0 | 0 | 156 | N4, Rustenburg, Wonderboom National | Tolled exit; Northern end of concurrency with N4 |
| Tshwane | Pretoria | 0 | 0 | SANRAL Pumulani Toll Plaza | | |
| Tshwane | Soshanguve | 0 | 0 | 163 | R101 Old Warmbaths Road, Pyramid, Wallmannsthal | |
| Tshwane | Soshanguve | 0 | 0 | 172 | R101 Old Warmbaths Road, Petronella, Murrayhill | |
| Tshwane | Hammanskraal | 0 | 0 | 183 | R734, Hammanskraal, Boekenhoutskloof | Tolled northbound exit and southbound entrance |
| Tshwane | Hammanskraal | 0 | 0 | 192 | Carousel Hotel | Closed exit; Northbound exit only |
| Tshwane | Hammanskraal | 0 | 0 | SANRAL Carousel Toll Plaza | | |
N1 continues into Limpopo

=== Limpopo ===
| Municipality | Location | km | mi | Exit | Destinations | Notes |
|---|---|---|---|---|---|---|
| Bela-Bela | Pienaarsrivier | 0 | 0 | 196 | R101, Maubane | |
| Bela-Bela | Pienaarsrivier | 0 | 0 | 205 | R101, Pienaarsrivier, Rust de Winter | |
| Bela-Bela | Bela-Bela | 0 | 0 | 224 | R576, Settlers, Codrington | |
| Bela-Bela | Bela-Bela | 0 | 0 | 238 | R516, Settlers, Bela-Bela | |
| Modimolle-Mookgophong | Modimolle | 0 | 0 | SANRAL Kranskop Toll Plaza | | |
| Modimolle-Mookgophong | Modimolle | 0 | 0 | — | R33, Marble Hall, Modimolle | Northbound exit, southbound entrance |
| Modimolle-Mookgophong | Modimolle | 0 | 0 | 273 | R101, Modimolle, Pretoria | Southbound exit, northbound entrance |
| Modimolle-Mookgophong | Mookgophong | 0 | 0 | 289 | R101, Mookgophong, Polokwane | Northbound exit, southbound entrance |
| Modimolle-Mookgophong | Mookgophong | 0 | 0 | 300 | R101, Mookgophong | Southbound exit, northbound entrance |
| Mogalakwena | Mokopane | 0 | 0 | SANRAL Nyl Toll Plaza | | |
| Mogalakwena | Mokopane | 0 | 0 | 334 | N11, Marble Hall, R101, Mokopane | Northbound exit, southbound entrance |
| Mogalakwena | Mokopane | 0 | 0 | — | R518, Mokopane, Zebediela | Truck exit; Part of Mokopane Traffic Control Centre |
| Mogalakwena | Mokopane | 0 | 0 | 352 | R101, Mokopane, Marble Hall | Southbound exit, northbound entrance; Tolled exit |
| Polokwane | Polokwane | 0 | 0 | 396 | R101 Thabo Mbeki Street, Polokwane, Mokopane | |
| Polokwane | Polokwane | 0 | 0 | 400 | R37 Church Street, Polokwane, Mashishing | |
| Polokwane | Polokwane | 0 | 0 | 402 | Dorp Street, Silicon Road | |
| Polokwane | Polokwane | 0 | 0 | 408 | R71 Grobler Street, R81 Munnik Avenue, Giyani, Tzaneen | Signed as exit 410 southbound |
| Polokwane | Polokwane | 0 | 0 | 416 | R101 Landdros Mare Street, Polokwane | No southbound entrance |
| Makhado | Bandelierkop | 0 | 0 | SANRAL Capricorn Toll Plaza | | |
| Makhado | Bandelierkop | 0 | 0 | — | R36, Morebeng | At-grade intersection |
| Makhado | Louis Trichardt | 0 | 0 | — | R578, Elim, Giyani | At-grade traffic circle |
| Makhado | Louis Trichardt | 0 | 0 | — | R522 Rissik Street, Louis Trichardt, Vivo | At-grade intersection |
| Makhado | Louis Trichardt | 0 | 0 | — | R524 Songozwi Street, Thohoyandou | At-grade intersection |
| Makhado | Louis Trichardt | 0 | 0 | Hendrik Verwoerd Tunnels | | |
| Makhado | Louis Trichardt | 0 | 0 | — | R523, Waterpoort | At-grade intersection |
| Musina | Musina | 0 | 0 | SANRAL Baobab Toll Plaza | | |
| Musina | Musina | 0 | 0 | — | R525, Tshipise | At-grade intersection |
| Musina | Musina | 0 | 0 | 604 | Old National Road, Musina | |
| Musina | Musina | 0 | 0 | 610 | R572 Old National Road, Musina | |
| Musina | Beitbridge | 0 | 0 | Beitbridge Border Post; Alfred Beit Road Bridge | | |
N1 ends; A4 A6 A4/A6 continues into Zimbabwe

== Trans-African Highway Network ==
The section of the N1 from Cape Town to the split with the N12 national route at Three Sisters, Northern Cape is declared part of the Trans-African Highway Network no. 4 or Cairo-Cape Town Highway, which is the route designated by the United Nations Economic Commission for Africa between Cairo and Cape Town. (The route continues as the N12 northwards from Three Sisters.)

== Old Route ==
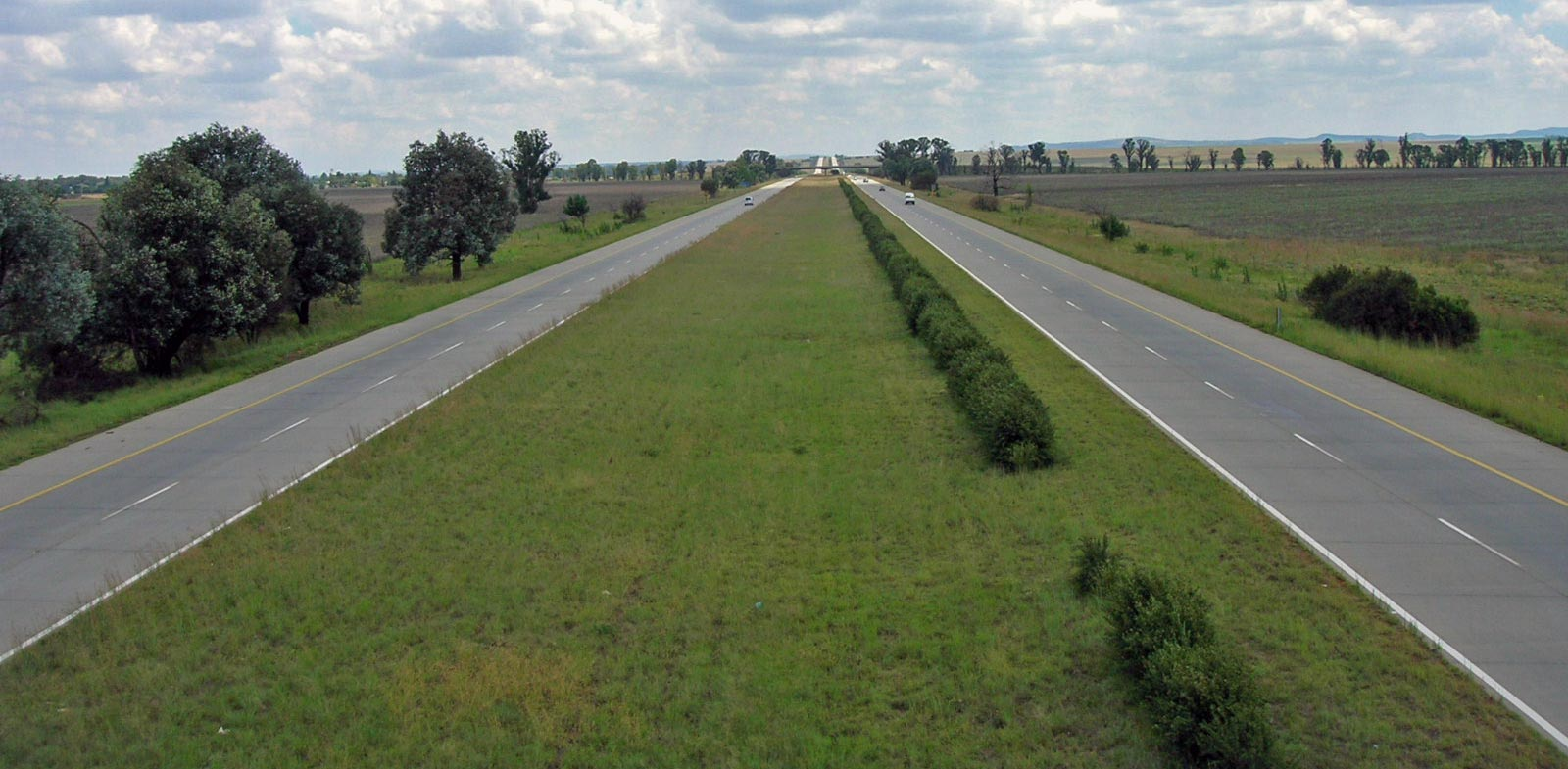
A section of dual-carriageway freeway on the N1 near Vanderbijlpark in Gauteng (2008)

In numerous places in South Africa, specifically near major cities, the N1 route has been rebuilt to freeway standards. The original routes usually carry the designation of R101 and are often alternative routes to the newer, sometimes tolled, highways. Two examples are the R101 over Du Toitskloof Pass, where the new N1 highway bypasses the pass altogether by use of the Huguenot Tunnel, and the R101 through Polokwane Central, where the new N1 highway bypasses the city centre by use of the Polokwane Eastern Bypass.

There are exceptions to the usual R101 alternative route designation:

- The old N1 route from Colesberg to Bloemfontein is designated R717 up until Reddersburg, where it's designated N6 to Bloemfontein.
- The old N1 route through Bloemfontein is designated as the M30.
- Between Bloemfontein and Winburg, the old route is designated firstly as the R30 between Bloemfontein and Brandfort and then is not designated to Winburg.
- Between Kroonstad and Parys, the old route is designated firstly as the R721 from Kroonstad to Vredefort and then as the R59 through Parys to the interchange with the N1 at the Vaal Toll Plaza, approximately 10 km south of the Vaal River.
- Between the Vaal River and Johannesburg, several alternative routes exist, the official alternative route being via the Golden Highway (R553). The old N1 route however followed the designation of the R42 through Vanderbijlpark to Vereeniging, and then the R82 leading to Johannesburg's M1 freeway. The M1 as well as Old Pretoria Road and Louis Botha Avenue (together designated as the M11 road) provide the alternative route through Johannesburg; near the Buccleuch Interchange (the point where the N1, M1 and N3 converge), the M11 becomes the R101, providing the alternative route through to Polokwane via Midrand, Centurion, Pretoria, Bela-Bela, Modimolle & Mokopane.

== Tolls ==
The list below only includes mainline toll plazas; ramp toll plazas have not been included.

| Name | Location | Toll fees (as of 1 March 2020) | | | |
| Name | Location | Light vehicle | Heavy vehicle (2 axles) | Heavy vehicle (3/4 axles) | Heavy vehicle (5+ axles) |
|---|---|---|---|---|---|
| Huguenot Toll Plaza | Paarl; 33°44′34″S 19°01′11″E | R41.50 | R115.00 | R179.00 | R290.00 |
| Verkeerdevlei Toll Plaza | near Verkeerdevlei; 28°47′56″S 26°41′26″E | R59.50 | R119.00 | R179.00 | R251.00 |
| Vaal Toll Plaza | near Parys; 26°51′23″S 27°38′07″E | R69.50 | R130.00 | R157.00 | R209.00 |
| Grasmere Toll Plaza | Lenasia; 26°24′41″S 27°53′03″E | R21.00 | R62.00 | R73.00 | R96.00 |
| Pumulani Toll Plaza | N4 exit to Rustenburg; 25°38′22″S 28°16′32″E | R12.50 | R31.00 | R36.00 | R44.00 |
| Carousel Toll Plaza | between Pretoria and Bela Bela; 25°19′22″S 28°17′52″E | R58.00 | R155.00 | R171.00 | R198.00 |
| Kranskop Toll Plaza | between Bela Bela and Modimolle; 24°46′54″S 28°28′17″E | R46.50 | R119.00 | R159.00 | R195.00 |
| Nyl Toll Plaza | between Modimolle and Polokwane; 24°17′23″S 28°58′44″E | R60.50 | R113.00 | R137.00 | R183.00 |
| Capricorn Toll Plaza | between Polokwane and Louis Trichardt; 23°22′01″S 29°46′30″E | R48.50 | R133.00 | R155.00 | R195.00 |
| Baobab Toll Plaza | between Louis Trichardt and Musina; 22°38′49″S 29°55′07″E | R47.00 | R128.00 | R176.00 | R211.00 |

=== e-tolls in Gauteng ===
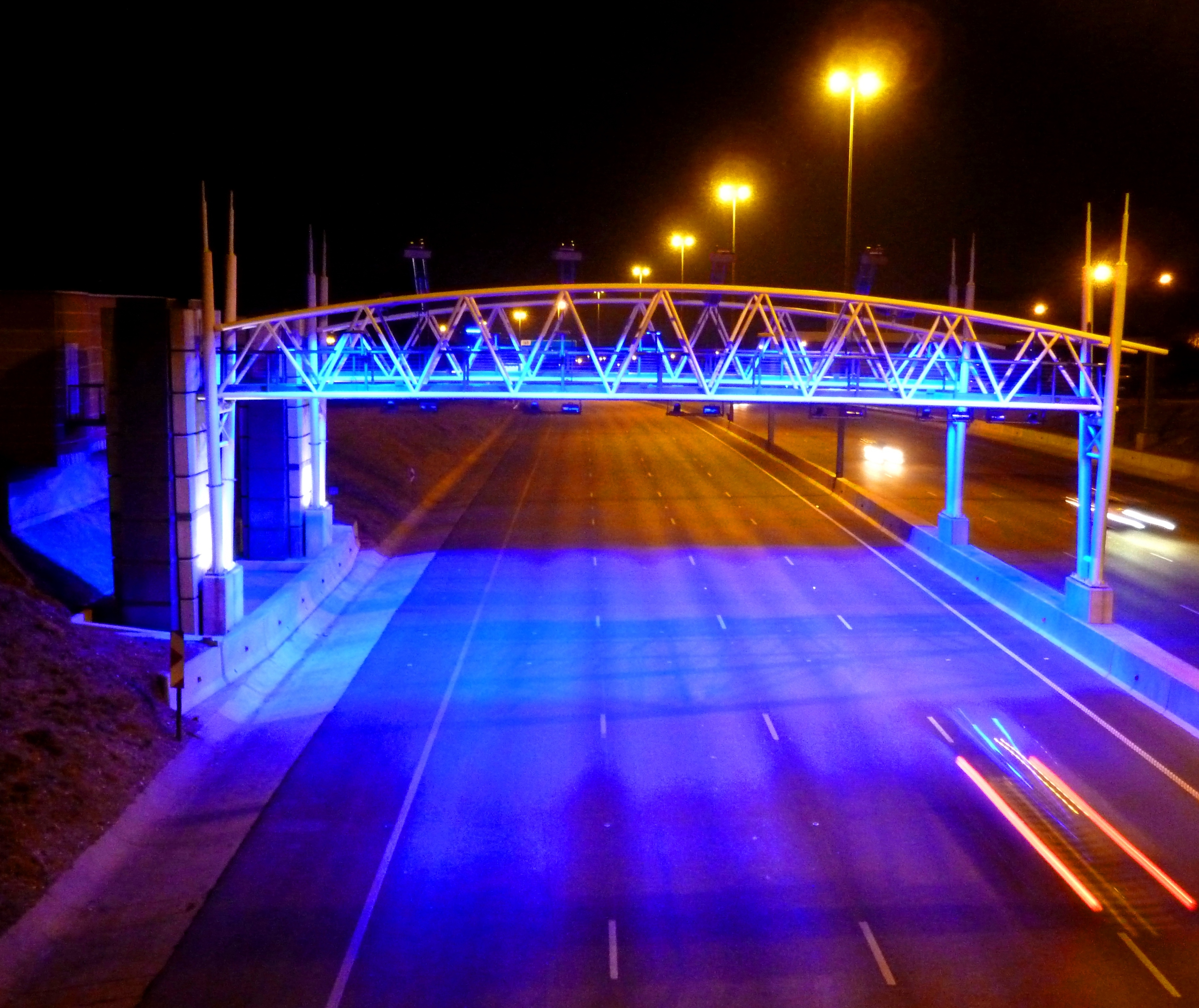
An e-toll gantry on the N1 northbound near Lynnwood, Pretoria.

As a result of the Gauteng Freeway Improvement Project, the section of the N1 from the R553 Golden Highway off-ramp in-between the Misgund and Diepkloof interchanges in Soweto to the Proefplaas Interchange with the N4 in Pretoria East was effectively declared an e-toll highway (with open road tolling) from 3 December 2013 onwards.

The South African government announced on 28 March 2024 that e-tolls in Gauteng would officially be shut down on 11 April 2024 at midnight. As a result of the e-toll discontinuation, this section of the N1 (which includes the Johannesburg Western Bypass, part of the Ben Schoeman Freeway and part of the Pretoria Eastern Bypass) became toll-free.
