= R309 (South Africa) =

Regional route in South Africa

Regional route R309
- R309 route map

Route information
- Length: 70 km (43 mi)

Major junctions
- North end: R325 at Postmasburg
- South end: N8 between Groblershoop and Griekwastad

Location
- Country: South Africa

Highway system
- Numbered routes of South Africa
← R308	→ R310

The R309 is a Regional Route in South Africa that connects Postmasburg with the N8 between Groblershoop and Griekwastad.
