= R353 (South Africa) =

Regional route in South Africa

Regional route R353
- R353 route map

Route information
- Length: 323 km (201 mi)

Major junctions
- North end: R357 outside Brandvlei
- R63 in Williston; R356 in Fraserburg
- South end: N1 at Leeu-Gamka

Location
- Country: South Africa
- Towns: Fraserburg, Williston

Highway system
- Numbered routes of South Africa
← R352	→ R354

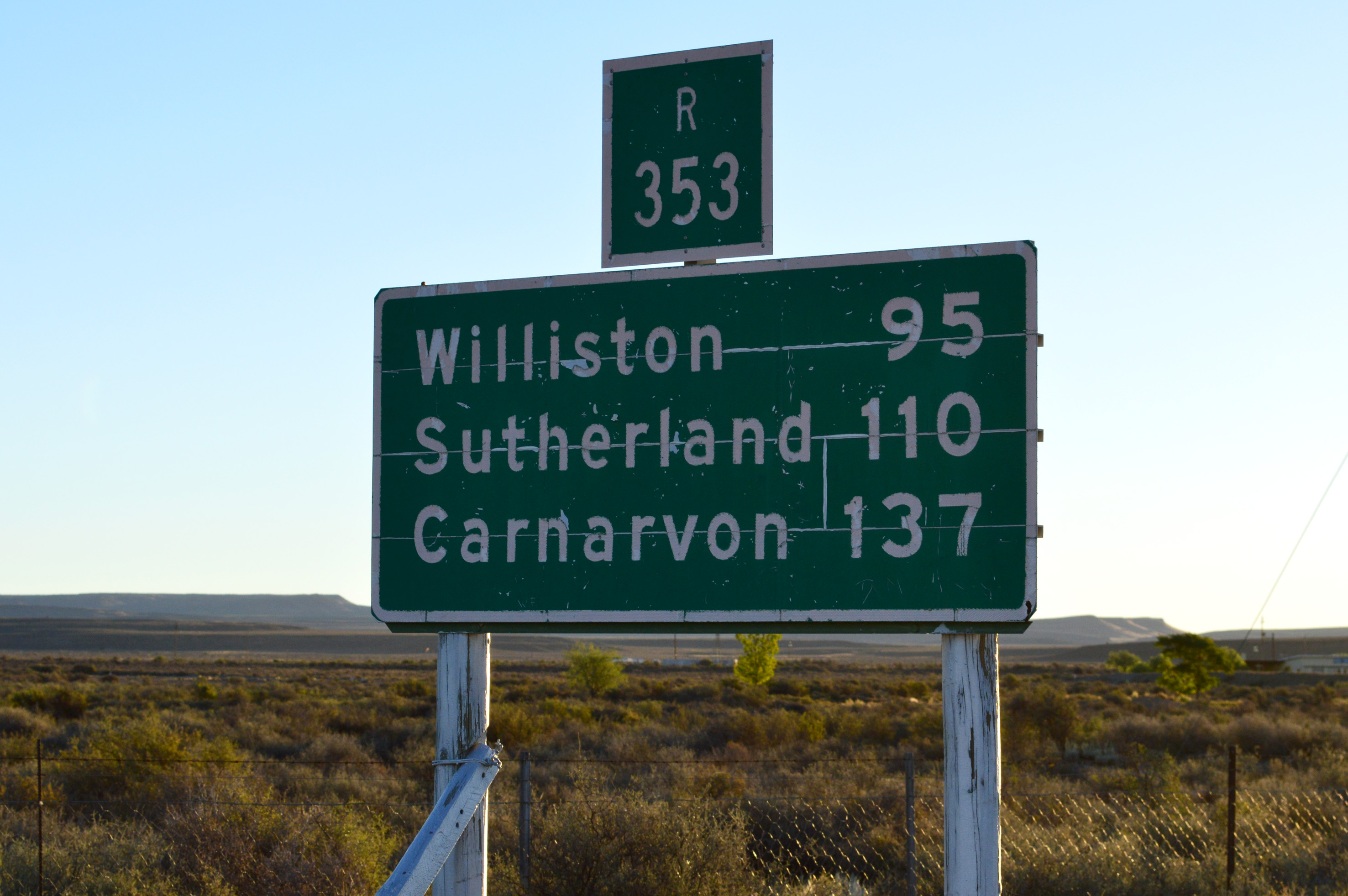
Roadsign on the R353 showing distances from Fraserburg

The R353 is a Regional Route in South Africa that connects Leeu-Gamka with Brandvlei via Fraserburg and Williston.

Its north-eastern terminus is the R357 at Brandvlei, Northern Cape. It initially heads south, then south-east to Williston where it meets the R63. It crosses at a staggered junction, and continues south-east to Fraserburg. At Fraserburg it crosses the R356 at another staggered junction. From Fraserburg it heads south-south-east. It passes through the Nuweveld Mountains via the Teekloof Pass and then enters the Western Cape. The route ends at Leeu-Gamka at the N1.
