= R361 (South Africa) =

Regional route in South Africa

Regional route R361
- R361 route map

Location
- Country: South Africa

Highway system
- Numbered routes of South Africa
← R360	→ R362

The R361 is a Regional Route in South Africa that connects Kenhardt with Carnarvon.

Its northern terminus is the R27 at Kenhardt. From there it heads south-east to the R357. The two routes are co-signed and heads south-west to Vanwyksvlei. At Vanwyksvlei, the routes diverge and the R361 again heads south-east, reaching its terminus at the R386 north of Carnarvon.
