= R382 (South Africa) =

Regional route in South Africa

Regional route R382
- R382 route map

Location
- Country: South Africa

Highway system
- Numbered routes of South Africa
← R381	→ R383

The R382 is a Regional Route in South Africa. From the N7 at Steinkopf, the route heads west through the Aninaus Pass to reach Port Nolloth on the west coast, where the route ends.
