= R412 (South Africa) =

Regional route in South Africa

Regional route R412

Location
- Country: South Africa

Highway system
- Numbered routes of South Africa
← R411	→ R500

The R412 is a Regional Route in South Africa.

== Route ==
Its northern terminus is the R56 at Ugie. It runs south-east to the R61 near Mthatha.
