= R63 (South Africa) =

Road in South Africa

Provincial route R63

Route information
- Maintained by NCDRPW, WCDTPW and ECDRPW
- Length: 941 km (585 mi)

Major junctions
- West end: R27 near Calvinia
- N12 in Victoria West; N1 between Three Sisters and Richmond; N9 / R61 in Graaff-Reinet; R75 near Graaff-Reinet; N10 in Cookhouse; N10 near Cookhouse; R67 in Fort Beaufort; N2 in Qonce; N6 near Kei Road
- East end: N2 near Komga

Location
- Country: South Africa
- Major cities: Williston; Carnarvon; Victoria West; Murraysburg; Graaff-Reinet; Pearston; Somerset East; Cookhouse; Bedford; Adelaide; Fort Beaufort; Alice; Middledrift; Qonce; Bhisho; Kei Road; Komga

Highway system
- Numbered routes of South Africa
← R62	→ R64

The R63 is a tarred provincial route in South Africa that connects Calvinia with Komga via Carnarvon, Victoria West, Graaff-Reinet, Somerset East and Qonce. It is cosigned with the N10 between Eastpoort and Cookhouse for 24 kilometres.

== Route ==
Detailed Route

=== Northern Cape and Western Cape ===
The R63 begins 20 kilometres east of Calvinia, Northern Cape at an intersection with the R27 road. It heads eastwards for 92 kilometres to the town of Williston, where it meets the R353 road. From Williston, the R63 heads eastwards for 128 kilometres to the town of Carnarvon, where it meets the southern terminus of the R386 road. At this junction, the R63 turns southwards and heads 63 kilometres to the town of Loxton, where it meets the northern terminus of the R381 road. At this junction, the R63 turns eastwards and heads 80 kilometres to the city of Victoria West, where it meets the N12 national route.

From Victoria West, the R63 heads south-east. After 48 kilometres, just after crossing into the Western Cape, the R63 meets the N1 national route. From the N1 junction, the R63 continues south-east for 42 kilometres to the town of Murraysburg. From Murraysburg, the R63 continues south-east for 89 kilometres as the Ouberg Pass to cross into the Eastern Cape and enter the city of Graaff-Reinet.

=== Eastern Cape ===
The R63 bypasses the Nqweba Dam and crosses the Sundays River to enter Graaff-Reinet as Stockenstroom Street before turning eastwards as Caledon Street to meet the N9 national route and the R61 road at the Church Square in Graaff-Reinet Central. All 3 routes share one road southwards to cross the Sundays River and enter the southern suburbs, where the southwards road remains as the N9 and R61 while the R63 becomes the road to the south-south-east to cross the Sundays River one last time and pass to the east of Adendorp to exit the city. From Graaff-Reinet, the R63 heads southwards for 23 kilometres to meet the northern terminus of the R75 road. At this junction, the R63 turns eastwards and heads east-south-east for 98 kilometres, through Pearston (where it becomes the Bruintjieshoogte Pass), to the city of Somerset East, where it crosses the Little Fish River three times. The R63 heads eastwards for another 21 kilometres to the town of Cookhouse, where it meets the N10 national route and crosses the Great Fish River.

The R63 & N10 are one road north-east for 24 kilometres before the R63 becomes its own road eastwards near a place named Eastpoort. The R63 heads eastwards for 43 kilometres, through Bedford, to the town of Adelaide (south of the Winterberg mountain range), where it crosses the Koonap River and meets the R344 road. They are one road south-east for almost 4 kilometres before the R344 becomes its own road southwards. From Adelaide, the R63 heads east-south-east for 31 kilometres to enter Fort Beaufort and meet the R67 road west of the town centre. They are one road for 650 metres up to a t-junction, where the R67 turns north and the R63 turns south to cross the Kat River. Shortly after, the R63 turns eastwards. From the Fort Beaufort town centre, the R63 heads eastwards for 22 kilometres to the town of Alice, where it meets the R345 road in the town centre. They are one road eastwards for almost 5 kilometres before the R345 becomes its own road northwards.

From the R345 split near Alice, the R63 heads eastwards for 54 kilometres, through Middledrift and Dimbaza, to Qonce in the Buffalo City Metropolitan Municipality, where it meets the N2 national route. They become one road eastwards as they enter the city centre of Qonce, crossing the Buffalo River. They become Buffalo Road southwards and at the Grey Street junction, they meet the R346 road. All 3 routes become Grey Street eastwards up to the Alexandra Road junction, where the R346 becomes Alexandra Road northwards, the N2 becomes Alexandra Road southwards and the R63 remains on the easterly road, which changes its name to Maitland Road and heads north-east for another 3 kilometres to Bhisho, the capital of the Eastern Cape.

The R63 heads north-east for another 25 kilometres to pass the town of Kei Road and meet the N6 national route. It proceeds eastwards for 44 kilometres, bypassing Komga, to end at another junction with the N2 national route.
