= R411 (South Africa) =

Regional route in South Africa

Regional route R411

Location
- Country: South Africa

Highway system
- Numbered routes of South Africa
← R410	→ R412

The R411 is a Regional Route in South Africa. It runs from the N2 at Viedgesville south of Mthatha, east-south-east to Coffee Bay.
