= R27 (South Africa) =

Road in South Africa

Provincial route R27

Route information
- Maintained by WCDTPW and SANRAL

Major junctions
- South end: N1 in Cape Town
- R45 near Langebaanweg; N7 in Vanrhynsdorp; R63 near Calvinia
- North end: N14 in Keimoes

Location
- Country: South Africa
- Major cities: Cape Town; Milnerton; Blaauwberg; Melkbosstrand; Velddrif; Vredendal; Vanrhynsdorp; Calvinia; Brandvlei; Kenhardt; Keimoes

Highway system
- Numbered routes of South Africa
← R26	→ R28

The R27 is a provincial route in South Africa that consists of two disjoint segments. The first segment, also known as the West Coast Highway, connects Cape Town with Velddrif along the West Coast. The second runs from Vredendal via Vanrhynsdorp, Calvinia, Brandvlei and Kenhardt to Keimoes on the N14 near Upington. The connection between Velddrif and Vredendal has never been built, although it can be driven on various gravel roads.

Originally the R27 designation continued beyond Upington all the way to Pretoria, but this section became part of the N14 and various other roads.

In Cape Town, the highway connects with Table Bay Boulevard (N1) near the Table Bay Harbor and then runs north along the coast as a stretch that is known as Marine Drive through the coastal town of Milnerton. This stretch contains many industrial warehouses. As it leaves Milnerton to enter Blouberg (Blaauwberg) the road moves further inland and the M14 becomes the main coastal road, continuing towards Melkbosstrand (where it bypasses to the east). Further north the road passes through West Coast National Park before reaching Velddrif.

The northern segment of the road is exceptionally desolate; it is a distance of 370 kilometres (230 mi) from Calvinia to Keimoes, and the only towns along the way are Brandvlei and Kenhardt.

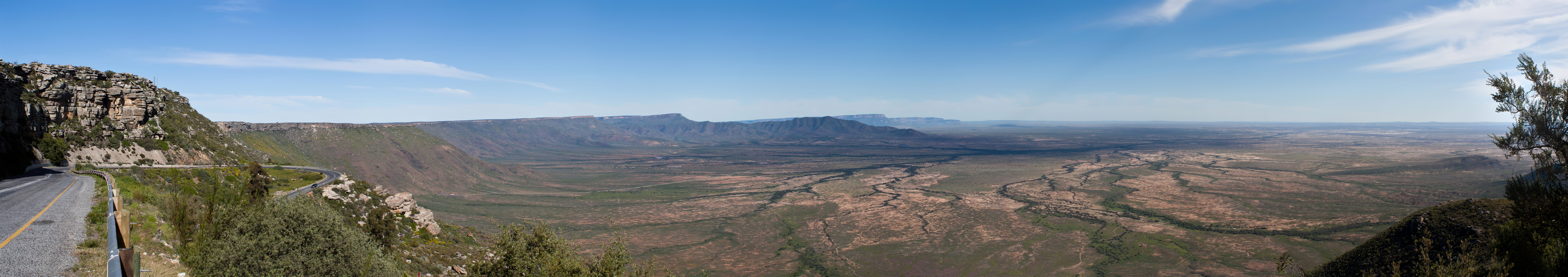
View from Vanrhyns Pass, a section of the R27 on the Bokkeveld Escarpment. In the valley below the road continues to Vanrhynsdorp, with the Knersvlakte region to the right.

== Route ==
Detailed Route

=== First Section ===
The R27 begins in Cape Town (east of the city centre; adjacent to Table Bay), at an interchange with the N1 highway. It begins by going northwards as Marine Drive for 13 kilometres, through Milnerton, to reach a junction with the M14 road. It then separates Table View in the east from Bloubergstrand in the west and reaches a junction with the M12 road.

The R27 heads northwards for 10 kilometres as West Coast Road, through the Blouberg Nature Reserve, to reach a junction in Melkbosstrand, where it meets the M14 road again and the M19 road. It continues northwards for 49 kilometres to leave the City of Cape Town and reach a junction with the R315 road east of Yzerfontein.

The R27 continues northwards for 49 kilometres, through the West Coast National Park, bypassing Langebaan, to reach a junction with the R45 road east of Vredenburg and west of Langebaanweg. The R27 heads northwards for 19 kilometres to cross the Berg River and reach the end of its first stint at a junction with the R399 road in Velddrif.

=== Second Section ===
The second section of the R27 begins in Vredendal, at a junction with the R363 road. It begins by crossing the Olifants River and meeting the R362 road in Vredendal before heading eastwards for 22 kilometres to cross the N7 national route and enter the town of Vanrhynsdorp. It continues north-east for 50 kilometres to the town of Nieuwoudtville, where it meets the south-western terminus of the R357 road. It then heads east for 69 kilometres to the town of Calvinia, where it meets the R355 road.

From Calvinia, the R27 heads eastwards for 26 kilometres to meet the western terminus of the R63 road. Here, it turns to the north-east and heads for 127 kilometres to the town of Brandvlei, where it meets the R357 road again. It continues north-east for 143 kilometres to the town of Kenhardt. It continues northwards for 75 kilometres to cross the Orange River and reach its end at a junction with the N14 national route in the town of Keimoes (39 kilometres south-west of Upington).
