= Loeriesfontein =

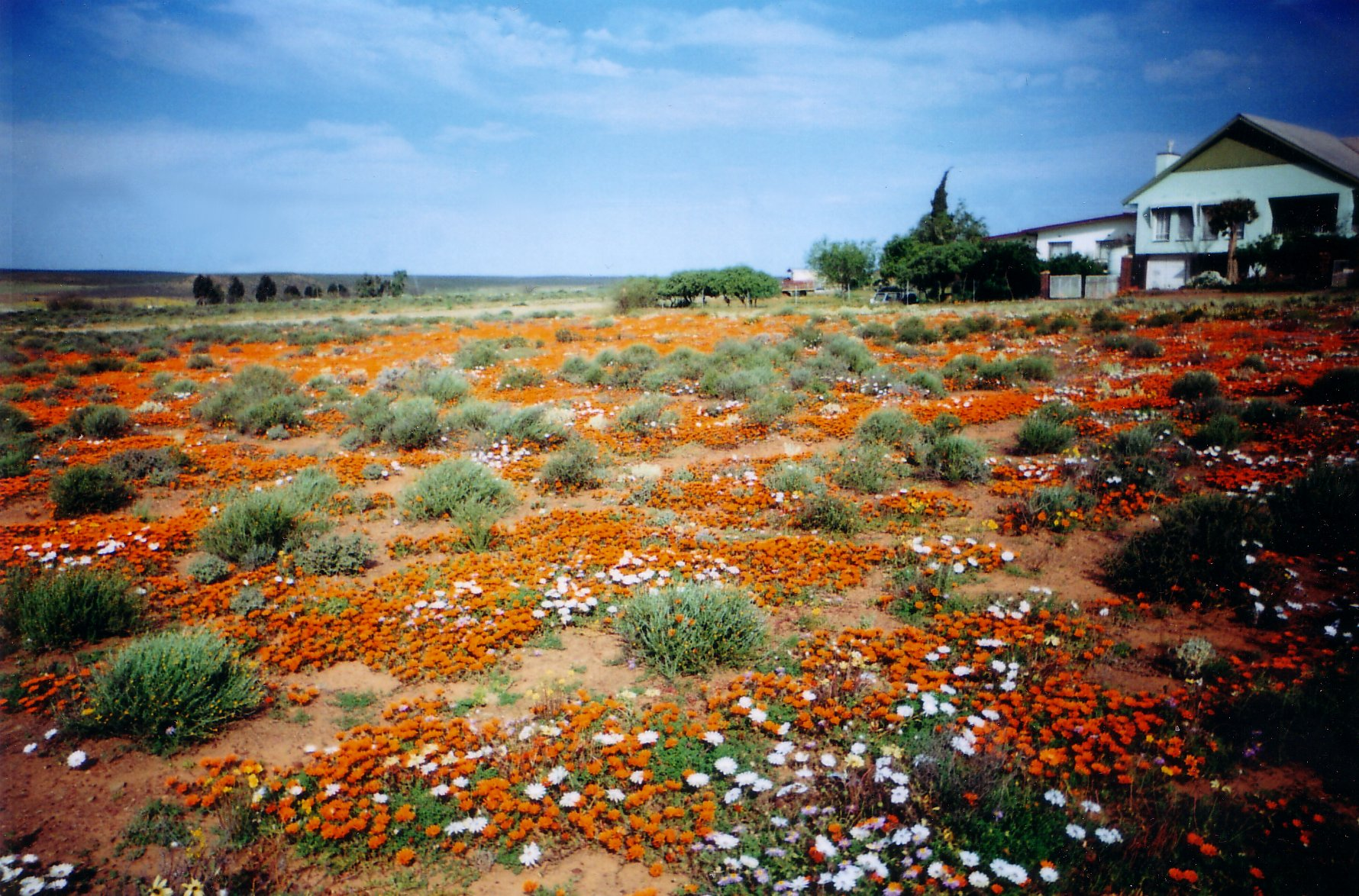
- Spring flowers attract visitors to Loeriesfontein in August and September

- Location within Northern Cape Location within South Africa
- Coordinates: 30°57′S 19°26′E
- Country: South Africa
- Province: Northern Cape
- District: Namakwa
- Municipality: Hantam

Area
  - Total: 34.46 km^{2} (13.31 sq mi)

Population (2011)
  - Total: 2,744
  - Density: 79.63/km^{2} (206.2/sq mi)

Racial makeup (2011)
  - Black African: 2.0%
  - Coloured: 86.3%
  - Indian/Asian: 0.1%
  - White: 11.0%
  - Other: 0.7%

First languages (2011)
  - Afrikaans: 98.7%
  - Other: 1.3%
- Time zone: UTC+2 (SAST)
- Postal code (street): 8185
- PO box: 8185
- Area code: 027

Loeriesfontein is a small town in the Northern Cape of South Africa. It falls within what is known as the Hantam region.

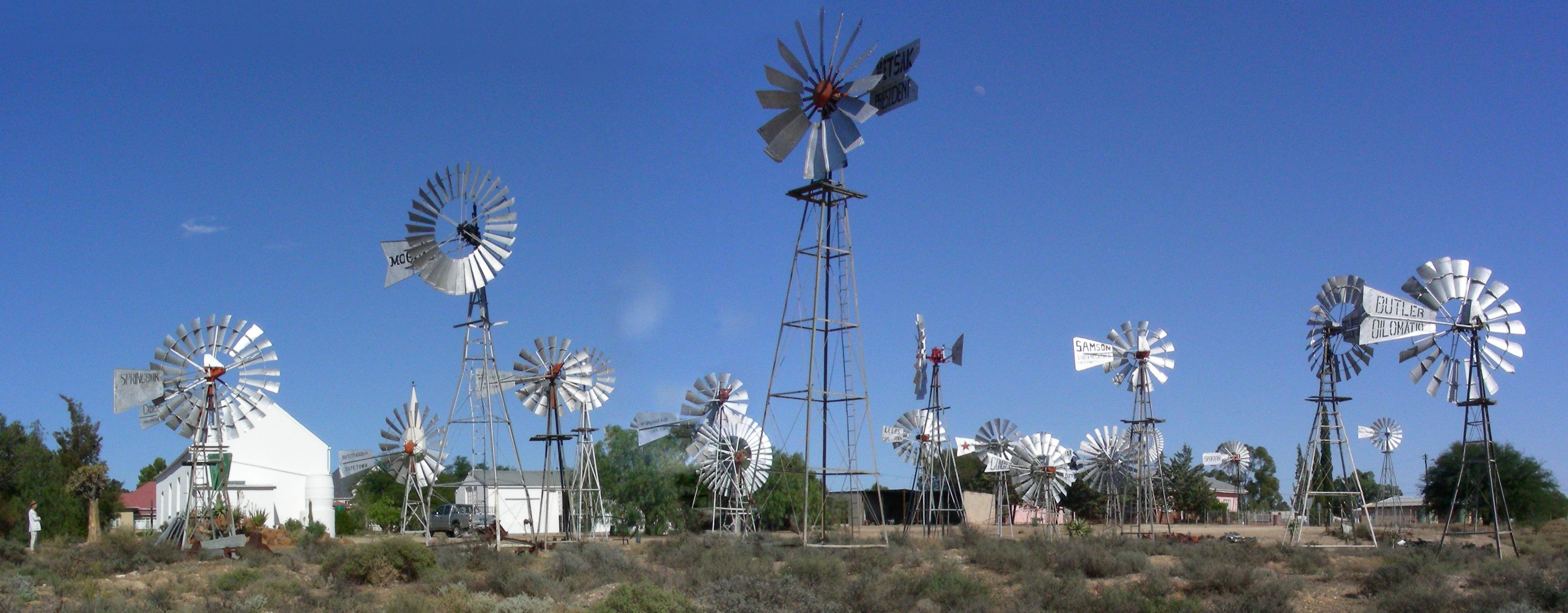
The 27 water-pumping windmills on display in Loeriesfontein – see the figure at the left for a sense of scale.

== The town ==
=== Location ===
The town of Loeriesfontein is within a basin surrounded by mountains and sandy Bushveld.

=== Local government ===
Loeriesfontein became a municipality in 1958, but it has since lost that status in a re-organization of municipal responsibilities that incorporated it into Hantam Local Municipality.

=== History and context ===
The Black Africans of Loeriesfontein who represent 86% of the population predates 1894. Little is said about their existence in this town but shops normally grow when one has buyers who already lived in the town. Records revealed people born as early as 1833, living in Loeriesfontein. The Farm Loeriesfontein was given to a number of families from the brown community by the Queen of England. Today 19000 Ha of farming land, belong to the brown community of Loeriesfontein.

The town allegedly grew around a general store established in 1894 by a travelling Bible salesman, named Fredrick Turner, the son of the sister of Charles Spurgeon. He came from Norwich, England. The store still exists. It is currently owned by Victor Haupt, the grandson of Fredrick Turner. The shop is currently called Turner & Haupt SPAR, and is 130 years in the family.

Southwestern Loeriesfontein forms part of the wider region known as Namaqualand, an area well known for its spring flowers (August and September) and its great variety of different plants - some 4,000 varieties are said to be evident in this region. The flowers attract visitors to the region, but at other times agriculture (sheep) and mining (salt) are the main commercial activities.

==== Loeriesfontein Renewable Energy ====
The Loeriesfontein and Khobab Wind Farms are part of the South African Government’s Round 3 Renewable Energy Independent Power Producer Procurement Programme (REIPPP) and are managed both in terms of construction and operations by Mainstream Renewable Power South Africa. The Loeriesfontein and Khobab Wind Farms, are expected to be operational by December 2017. Situated in the Northern Cape, which has the highest volume of renewable energy utility power plants in the country, these sister wind farms comprise a total of 122 wind turbine generators, spanning 6,653 hectares. Collectively the wind farms will power circa 240,000 South African households, positively impacting the country’s economy and its people.

== Places of interest ==
=== Windmill Museum ===
The late Dr Walton, a British born Capetonian was well known for his interest in different aspects of conservation, including the conservation of water-pumping windmills or windpumps. He wrote a book on this subject with the late Mr André Pretorius ("Windpumps in South Africa", published by Human and Rousseau in 1998 but currently out of print). In order to share this collected knowledge with a wider audience, he invited potentially interested organisations and places to start a windpump museum. The Fred Turner museum at Loeriesfontein was the only respondent. Since its establishment there, the museum team and interested persons all over South Africa have sponsored and collected 27 windpumps, now assembled and on display.

=== Fred Turner folk and culture museum ===
The culture and historical way of life of the "Trek Farmers" of Namaqualand (also known as Bushmanland or Hantam) is displayed in this museum which is housed in the old school adjacent to the Windmill display (which is in what was the school playground). More than 1000 items are on display, including a trek wagon, equipped tent, kook skerm and a horse mill.

=== Salt pans ===
100 km from Loeriesfontein in the spacious plains of Bushmanland are salt pans (dwaggas) that are still in production.

=== Quiver trees ===
Large quiver trees (a species of aloe known as kokerboom in Afrikaans) can be seen at Gannabos on the road from Nieuwoudtville to Loeriesfontein.

== Events ==
=== Flowers in season ===
The area is famous for the display of wild flowers in the season, principally during August and September. This is the time when most visitors come to the area.

=== Thanksgiving Weekend ===
The annual Thanksgiving Weekend - in the form of a traditional church fête, takes place on the first weekend of the September/October school holiday.

=== Agricultural show ===
An annual agricultural show is well established and takes place in October. It has status at the provincial and national levels and focuses on sheep and saddle horses.
