= Loxton, South Africa =

Loxton
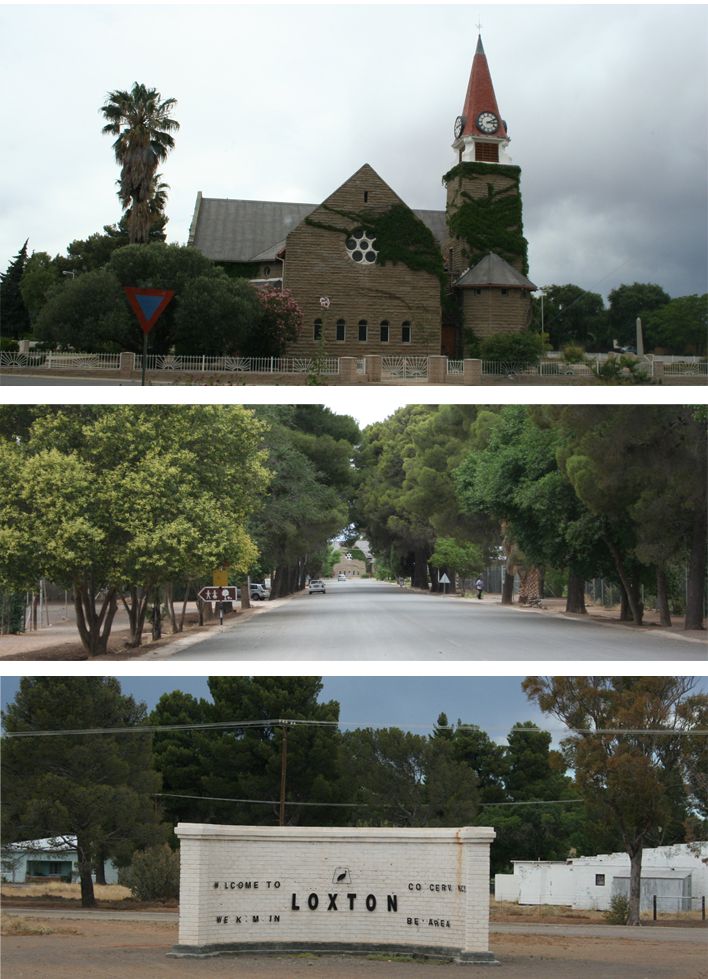
- View of Top to Bottom Loxton church, Loxton main & Loxton sign

- Location within Northern Cape Location within South Africa
- Coordinates: 31°28′S 22°21′E
- Country: South Africa
- Province: Northern Cape
- District: Pixley ka Seme
- Municipality: Ubuntu

Area
  - Total: 77.61 km^{2} (29.97 sq mi)

Population (2011)
  - Total: 1,053
  - Density: 13.57/km^{2} (35.14/sq mi)

Racial makeup (2011)
  - Black African: 3.1%
  - Coloured: 85.4%
  - Indian/Asian: 0.3%
  - White: 10.7%
  - Other: 0.5%

First languages (2011)
  - Afrikaans: 93.8%
  - English: 3.6%
  - Other: 2.6%
- Time zone: UTC+2 (SAST)
- PO box: 6985
- Area code: 053

Loxton is a town in the Karoo region of South Africa's Northern Cape province. Within the Ubuntu Local Municipality of the Pixley ka Seme District Municipality

It is in one of the major wool-producing and one of the largest garlic-producing areas in South Africa.

With a population of 1,053 in 2011, the area is quiet and sparsely populated. Afrikaans is the most widely spoken language in the town.

== History ==
Loxton was originally a farm called Phizantefontein, which was owned by A.E. Loxton, whom the town is named after. The farm was bought from him in 1899 by the Dutch Reformed Church for £7,500 so as to establish a parish for local farmers. The town is believed to have been named after A.E Loxton due to a £50 donation he made to fund the salary of the town's first Dutch Reformed Church minister.

The town's first church building and schoolhouse was built in 1900. Tree-lined streets and flood irrigation channels that run alongside the town's main roads were completed in the same year. The town became a municipality in 1905 as it developed to serve the region's sheep-farming community. The church that stands in the town's centre was constructed in 1924.

Most of the small town was destroyed by a flash flood that caused the town's dam to burst in March 1961. The town has since recovered from the disaster.

== Architecture ==
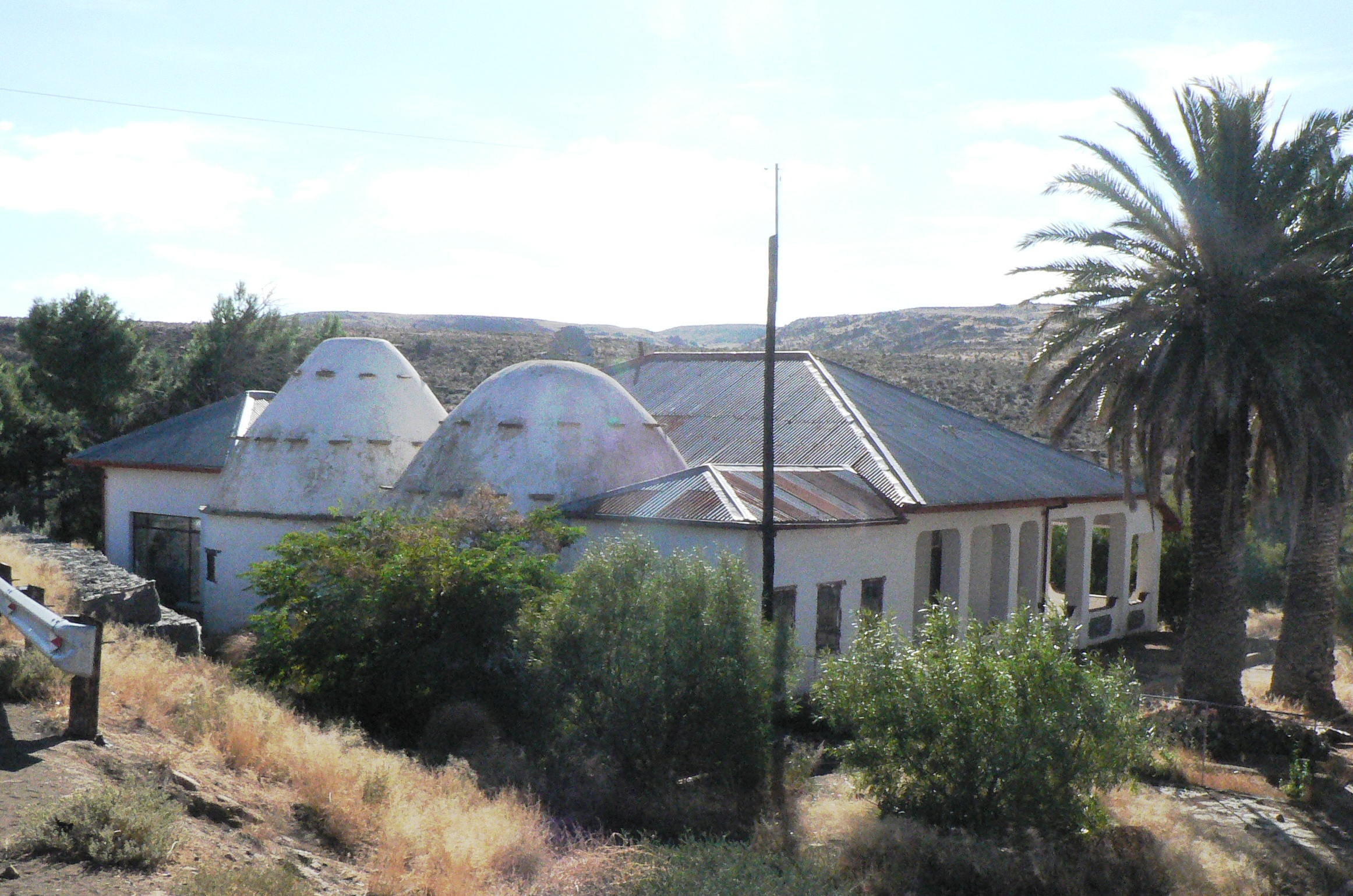
Corebelled Houses, Konka Farm, Carnarvon District

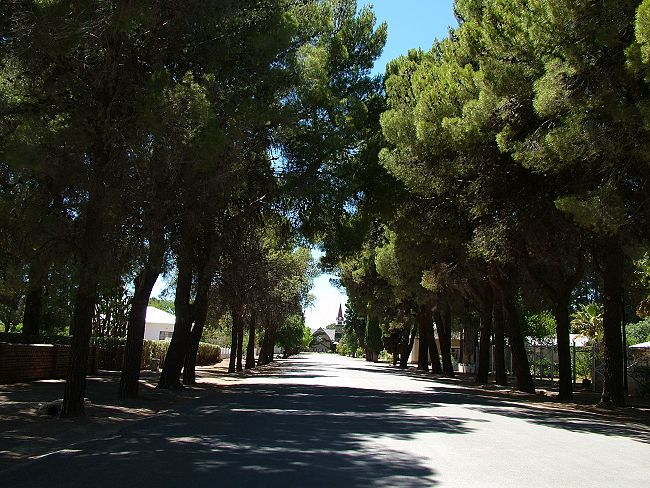
Loxton main road

The farms surrounding Loxton are characterised by beehive-shaped Corbelled Houses that have roofs with no supporting roof beams and structures built using local stone. They were first built around 1811 by the Trekboers, nomadic farmers who descended from European settlers. They used the local stone to build their homes due to a lack of other building materials.

The oldest building in the town is a redundant power station, which was originally a horse stable on what was then the Phizantefontein farm. Even after years of being unoccupied, many of the buildings have been restored and still stand over 100 years after they were first built, as examples of typical vernacular Karoo architecture. Throughout the town are various styles of corrugated iron roofs such as the smooth, round-edged bullnose, the curved ogee and the concave roof. Several Loxton buildings are also characterised by diamond windows on end walls, pedimented walls, classical pillars and balusters. Some of the old buildings also feature strong wooden shutters and sash windows.

== Notable people ==
- Ena Murray (1936-2015), Afrikaans language novelist and writer.
- Beyers Naudé (1915-2004), theologian and anti-apartheid activist.
- Annelise Vorster, Landscape and portrait artist.
- Deon Meyer, novelist.
