= R324 (South Africa) =

Regional route in South Africa

Regional route R324
- R324 route map

Route information
- Length: 85.1 km (52.9 mi)

Major junctions
- North end: R62 at Barrydale
- R322 near Suurbraak; N2 near Buffeljagsrivier; R322 at Port Beaufort
- South end: Witsand

Location
- Country: South Africa

Highway system
- Numbered routes of South Africa
← R323	→ R325

The R324 is a Regional Route in South Africa that connects Barrydale to the north with Port Beaufort and Witsand to the south.

== Route ==
The R324 begins in Barrydale at a junction with the R62 and it heads south over the Tradouws Pass, crossing the Langeberg mountains. At the end of the pass, it reaches a t-junction, where the eastern route is signed as the R322 and the R324 continues as the western route. The westerly R324 passes through Suurbraak and then reaches a junction with the N2 near Buffeljagsrivier (12 kilometres east of Swellendam). It joins the N2 to be co-signed for 3 kilometres heading east. Diverging from the N2, the route then heads south-south-east to Port Beaufort, where it meets the other end of the R322. The R324 then runs east to end at the neighbouring village of Witsand.
