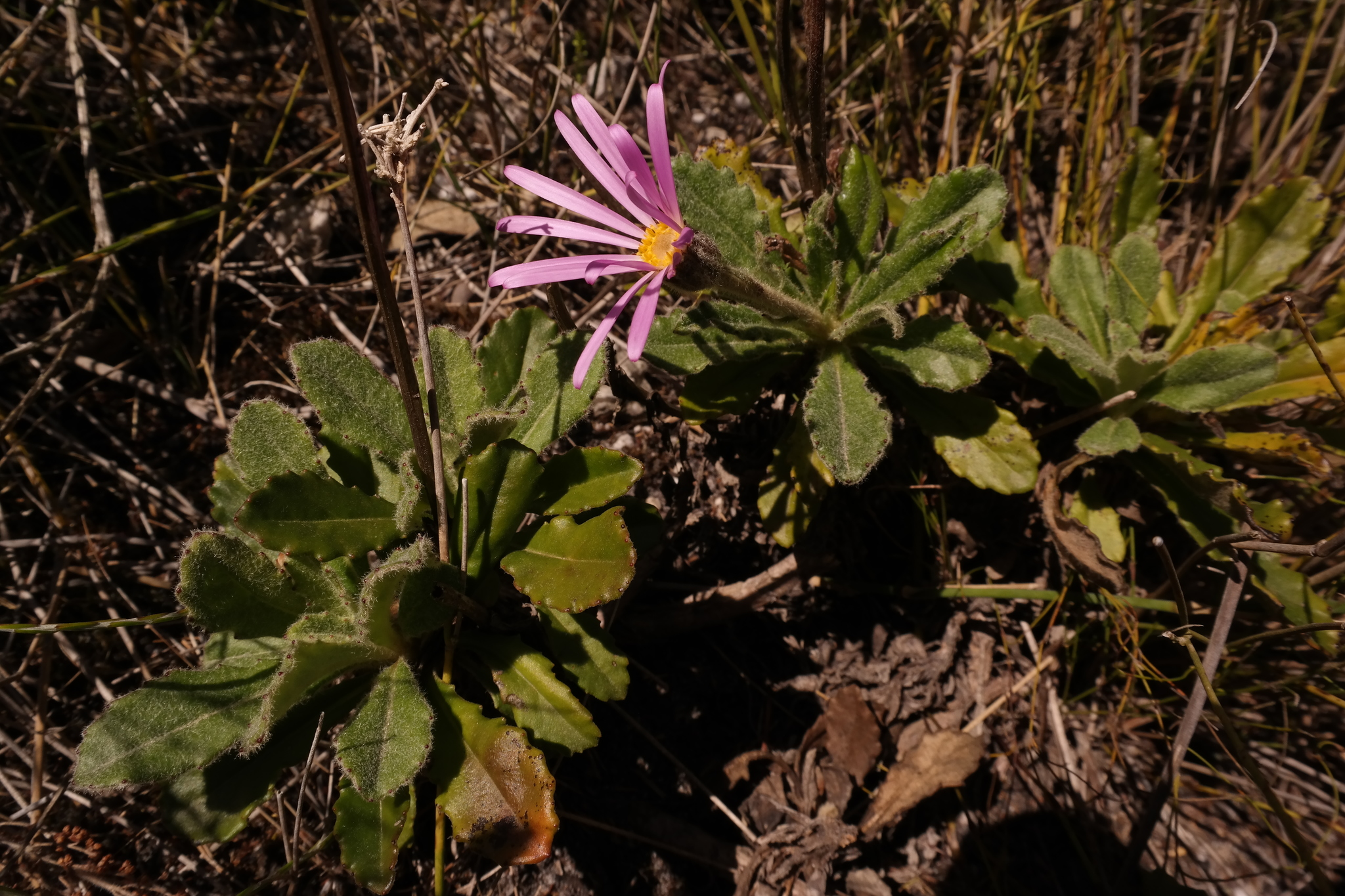

Scientific classification
- Kingdom: Plantae
- Clade: Tracheophytes
- Clade: Angiosperms
- Clade: Eudicots
- Clade: Asterids
- Order: Asterales
- Family: Asteraceae
- Genus: Mairia
- Species: M. hirsuta

Binomial name
- Mairia hirsuta DC.

Synonyms
- Cineraria purpurata, M. purpurata; Zyrphelis hirsuta

= Mairia hirsuta =

Perennial plant in the daisy family from South Africa

Mairia hirsuta is a tufted perennial, herbaceous plant of up to 40 cm (1 1/3 ft) high, that is assigned to the family Asteraceae. Most of its narrow to broad elliptic or inverted egg-shaped leaves are part of the basal rosette, have margin that is rolled under, with rounded or pointy teeth or with some peg-like extensions, lightly woolly on the upper surface and densely woolly on the underside, but always the green remains visible. Flower heads have been found from July to November, mostly after a fire or when the soil has been disturbed. The species can be found in the southern mountains of the Western Cape province of South Africa.

== Taxonomy ==
This species of fire daisy was first described by the famous Swedish botanist Carl Linnaeus in 1771 as Cineraria purpurata, based on a herbarium specimen from Caput Bonae Spei [Cape of Good Hope], a term then used for the larger Cape Region, that was sent to him by the governor of the Dutch Cape Colony between 1751 and 1771, Ryk Tulbagh. The description was however too general to determine without doubt which plant species it concerned, and Augustin Pyramus de Candolle in 1836, listed it as an inadequately known species. De Candolle in 1836, also described Mairia hirsuta based on four collections from the Langeberg to the northwest of Swellendam at Puspasvalei, Voormansbosch, Duivelsbosch and the banks of the Keurbooms River made by Christian Friedrich Ecklon and Karl Ludwig Philipp Zeyher. In 1891, Otto Kuntze reassigned it, making the combination Zyrphelis hirsuta. The name Cineraria purpurata is disregarded from that time on, until Glynis Cron, Kevin Balkwill and Eric B. Knox identify a lectotype and subsequently exclude the species from Cineraria, in their revision of that genus in 2006. In 2011, Santiago Ortiz and Ulrike Zinnecker-Wiegand revised the genera Mairia, Gymnostephium and Zyrphelis, and reinstated M. hirsuta. John Manning synonymised M. hirsuta and Cineraria purpurata in 2016, proposing the new combination Mairia purpurata. This has however not yet gained wide acceptance. The species is not synonymous with Gymnostephium hirsutum, described by Christian Friedrich Lessing in 1832.

== Description ==
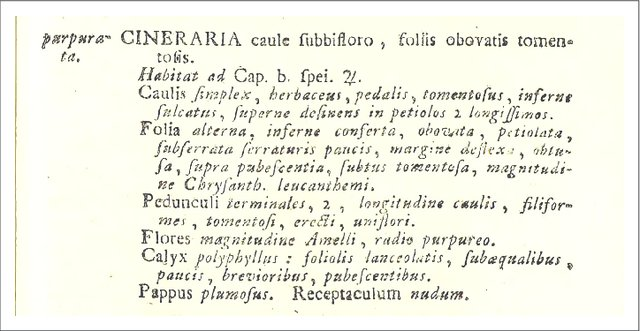
The original description of Cineraria purpurata by Carl Linnaeus, published in 1771

Mairia hirsuta is a tufted, robust, perennial, herbaceous plant of mostly 25–38 cm (10–15 in) high (full range 14–40 cm), that has one to three leaf rosettes at its base. Its dark brown roots are thick and fleshy and emerge from a woody and robust rhizome of up to 7 cm (3 in) long. Most of its leaves are part of the basal rosette, but some are set alternately on the lower parts of the approximately nine to eighteen inflorescence stalks. The leaves are seated or are sometimes a little or substantially narrowed into a leaf stalk of 3–25 mm (1/10–1 in) long. The leaf axils are sometimes densely woolly. The leaf blade varies in outline between narrowly or broadly inverted egg-shaped and narrowly elliptic to elliptic, mostly 4 1/3–10 cm (1 2/3–4 in) long (full range 3–12 1/2 cm) and 1 1/2–3 1/2 cm (0.6–1.4 in) wide (full range 3/4–5 cm). The leaves have a blunt to pointy tip and a margin that is rolled under, with rounded or pointy teeth or is sometimes almost entire with some peg-like extensions. The upper surface shows a distinct main vein, is hairless or has some dispersed woolly hairs. The lower surface of the leaves is leathery and hard, and sometimes succulent and then the netted veins may be nearly invisible. The lower leaf surface always remains visible through the dense or more open layer of woolly hairs, and appears whitish scaly with shiny, amber-coloured glands.

From each rosette, up to three robust, purplish brown or darkish red, mostly ribbed, at least higher up densely woolly flower stalks arise of 8–38 cm (3–15 in) long, thicker directly below the only flower head at its tip. The stalk also carries several line-shaped bracts of up to 5 cm (2 in) long that decrease in size upwards, and has the same hair cover as the leaves, their margins with wavy teeth or mostly entire, set at an angle or pressed to the stalk. Rarely the flower stalk branches in the upper two-thirds.

The between thirty two and forty six overlapping bracts, arranged in four whorls, that jointly surround the florets in the same head, form a broadly bell-shaped involucre that is 1 1/4–1 3/4 cm (1/2–1/3 in) high and 2–3 1/2 cm (3/4–1 1/3 in) in diameter. Those in the outermost whorl are purplish, densely woolly, line-shaped to very narrowly egg-shaped, oval or inverted egg-shaped, 7–8 1/2 mm (0.28–0.34 in) long and 1 1/2–2 3/4 mm (0.06–0.11 in) wide, with a pointy tip, with a fringe of equally long and regularly spaced hairs. In the inner whorl, bracts are line-shaped, 11–13 mm (0.43–0.51 in) long and 0.8–1.2 mm (0.031–0.047 in) mm wide, eventually hairless and straw-coloured at the base, and woolly and purplish towards the pointy tip, with a papery margin and long hairs along the edges.

=== Florets ===
Each flower head has about thirty, female ray florets. The corolla is reddish purple, mauve, pink or white. The lower tube-shaped part is 5–7 mm (0.20–0.28 in) long has some glandular hairs. The flat upper part (or limb) is line-shaped, 2–3 cm (4/5–1 1/5 in) long and 3–5 mm (0.12–0.20 in) wide, with four veins, ending with three teeth. The style of each ray floret is up to 5.5 mm (0.22 in) long, the upper 1.2–1.5 mm (0.047–0.059 in) is split into two line- to ellipse-shaped branches. The ray florets do not contain staminodes. In the center of the head are many bisexual disc florets that are shorter than the longest pappus bristles, and these florets consist of a tube at their base of 5–6 mm (0.20–0.24 in) long, with some irregularly spread glandular hairs, and five upright or recurved triangular lobes of about 1 mm (0.039 in) long, and often have a resin duct along their margin, and sometimes set with 0.4–0.8 mm (0.016–0.031 in) long hairs and shiny glands with rounded tips. The five anthers, which are, as is usual in the entire family Asteraceae, fused in a tube, are about 1 1/2–2 mm (0.06–0.08 in) long, each with a triangular appendage of about 1/2 mm (0.02 in) at their tip. When the disc floret opens, the style grows to about 6 mm (0.24 in) long, hoovering up the pollen on its shaft. The upper 1–1 1/2 mm (0.04–0.06 in) of the style is split into two line- to ellipse-shaped branches with deltoid appendages at its tip of 0.35 mm (0.014 in) wide and 0.2 mm (0.0079 in) long.

Surrounding the base of the corolla of both ray and disc florets are two whorls of white to straw-coloured pappus bristles. The outer whorl consist of free barbed bristles of 0.5–3.5 mm (0.020–0.138 in) long that alternate with the inner whorl. The pappus of the inner whorl consists of feathery bristles of 6.7–7.0 mm (0.26–0.28 in) long, either or not barbed and fused in a ring at their base. In both ray and disc florets, the brown, one-seeded, indehiscent, dry fruits (or cypselae) are cylinder- to spindle-shaped in outline, rarely inverted egg-shaped, 3.5–4.4 mm (0.14–0.17 in) long and 0.9–2.0 mm (0.035–0.079 in) wide. The cypselae have four to five, mostly dark brown, distinct ribs along their lengths. The cypselae are covered in shiny yellow glands. They also have a dense covering of deeply cleft, silky twin hairs of 0.4–0.5 mm (0.016–0.020 in) long, with branches that are almost equal in length, and no further adornment on the seed skin.

=== Differences with related species ===
The leaves of M. hirsuta are not as tidily arranged in rosettes as in the other species, and some leaves can even be found along the lower parts of the inflorescence stalks. M. hirsuta can also be distinguished from all other Mairia species by the combination of the regularly rounded or pointy teeth along the leaf margins, the long straps of the ray florets of 2–3 cm (0.79–1.18 in) long, and no staminodes in the ray florets.

Mairia hirsuta can easily be confused with M. robusta that has similar leaves, and also has long ray florets that lack staminodes. However, the underside of the leaves of M. hirsuta is visible and greenish, despite densely to sparsely woolly hair (giving a whitish scaly appearance, with shiny, amber-coloured glands). The lower leaf surface in M. robusta on the other hand, consists of two layers of hairs, a bluish grey cobwebby layer through which longer woolly hairs extend, making it white in colour and the leaf surface isn't visible through the hairs at all. In addition, the involucral bracts in M. hirsuta are overlapping, with the outer bracts distinctly smaller than the inner ones, whereas in M. robusta all bracts are more or less the same size.

== Distribution, ecology and conservation ==
Mairia hirsuta is a local endemic of the Langeberg between Swellendam, Suurbraak and the neighbouring Warmwaterberg. It is considered a rare species, because although it occupies a range of only about 59 km^{2} (23 sq mi), it is well protected in the Boosmansbos Wilderness Area and the Marloth Nature Reserve. Here it grows in a fynbos vegetation on the steep, south-facing slopes.
