= R322 (South Africa) =

Regional route in South Africa

Regional route R322
- R322 route map

Route information
- Length: 65 km (40 mi)

Major junctions
- North end: R324 near Suurbraak
- N2 in Heidelberg
- South end: R324 in Port Beaufort

Location
- Country: South Africa
- Towns: Heidelberg; Port Beaufort

Highway system
- Numbered routes of South Africa
← R321	→ R323

The R322 is a Regional Route in South Africa. Its northern origin is a t-junction with the R324 between Suurbraak and Barrydale. The northern and western routes are signed the R324, with R322 signed as the easterly road. It heads east-south-east to reach Heidelberg, where it meets the N2. It becomes co-signed with the N2 south-west for 4 kilometres before diverging to head south-south-west. It ends at Port Beaufort (west of Witsand), where it rejoins the R324.
