= Buffeljags River =

River in Western Cape, South Africa

Coordinates: 34°00′17″S 20°39′45″E

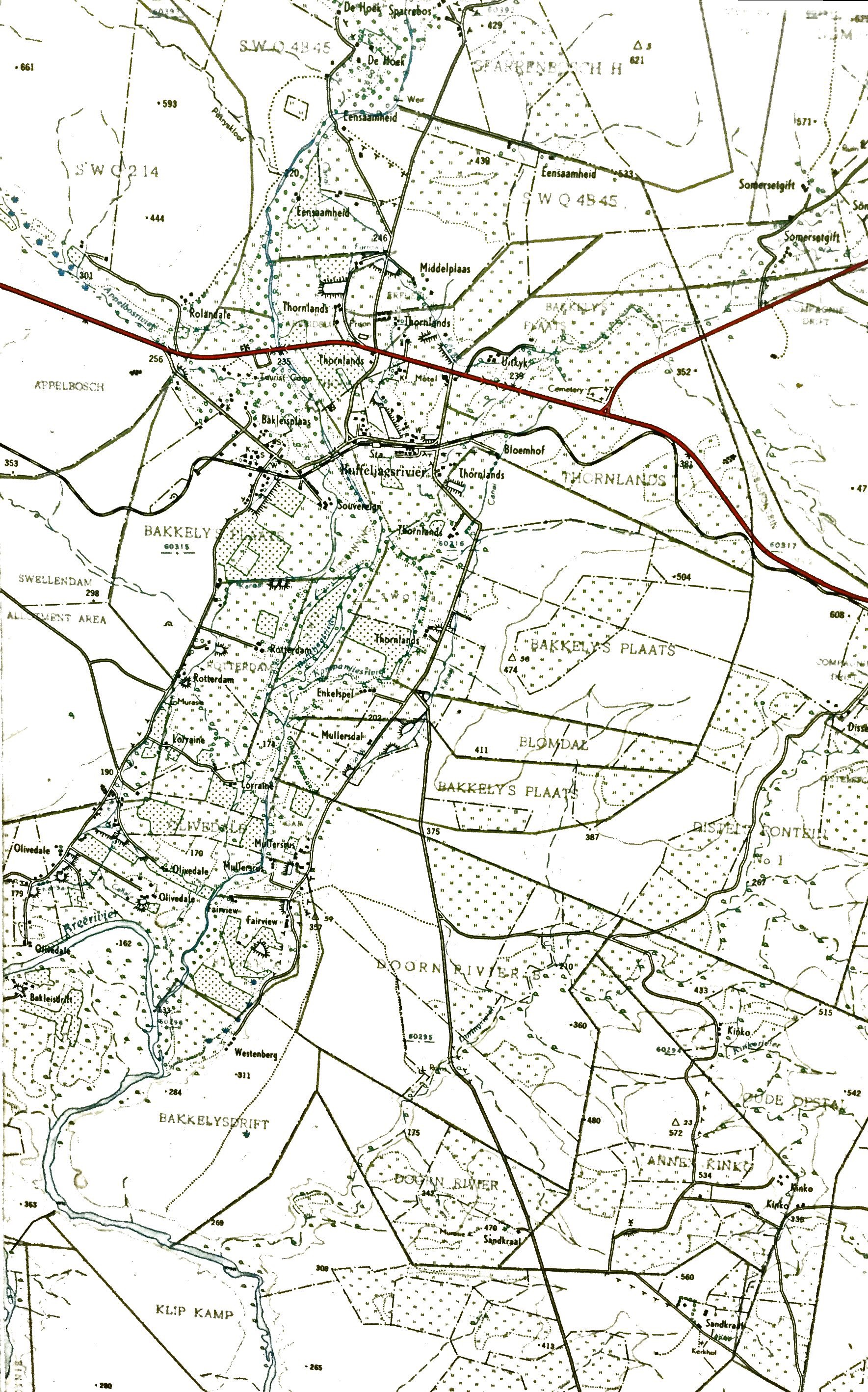

Buffeljagsriver (Afrikaans for "buffalo hunt") is a river that originates where two other rivers meet, one being the Grootvadersbos River (Afrikaans for Grandfather's woods) and the other the Tradou River. The confluence is just east of a small town, Suurbraak, Western Cape province. The Tradouw Pass is situated just north (in the Langeberg) of this meeting point. To the west of the town the river flows into the Buffeljags Dam, and the river then heads south to join the Breede River (also known as the Breë River), not far from the Bontebok National Park.

== The Buffeljagsrivier area ==
Buffeljagsrivier, not to be confused with Tweebuffelsmeteenskootmorsdoodgeskietfontein, is also the name of the small farming community located in the area.

The Buffeljagsriver area holds significant historical value. Its name dates back to the late 1800s when the son of Governor Hendrick Swellengrebel, after whom Swellendam was named, visited the region. Legend has it that he was responsible for shooting the last buffalo that inhabited the area.

Today, Buffeljagsriver is a flourishing farming community, cultivating a diverse range of crops and raising various animals. Among the notable tourism destinations in the area are Rotterdam, the lavender farm, and Olivedale Vineyards.

The area is fertile, yielding a variety of produce including vegetables, citrus fruits, milk and cheese, lavender, and peppers. The Buffeljagsdam, situated at the base of the Langeberg mountains ensures a year-round water supply for the farms located downstream.

Activities offered at Bufflejagsdam include fuffy-slide rides, bass fishing, canoeing, water-skiing and sunset cruises. The area offers various conference and team building facilities.

== Points of interest ==
- Bontebok National Park
- Buffeljags dam

== Businesses in the area ==
=== Accommodation and Recreation ===
- Kwetu Guest Farm
- Rotterdam Boutique Hotel
- Umshanti Buffeljags
- Laeveld

=== Retail ===
- Infanta 4x4 Trailers
- Rolandale Farmstall
- Milk and Sugar
- Buffeljacht's Winkel
- Buffeljacht's Drankwinkel
- BP (refueling station)

=== Industry and Farming ===
- Lancewood
- Thornlands Group
- Swellenfruit Packing

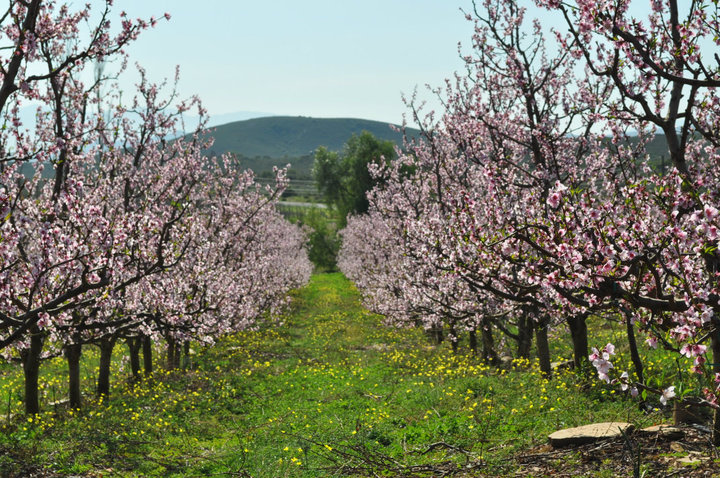

== See also ==
- Olivedale, Buffeljagsriver
- List of rivers of South Africa
- List of reservoirs and dams in South Africa
- List of drainage basins of South Africa
- Water Management Areas
