= Leucadendron tradouwense =

Conservation status
- Critically Endangered (IUCN 3.1)

Scientific classification
- Kingdom: Plantae
- Clade: Tracheophytes
- Clade: Angiosperms
- Clade: Eudicots
- Order: Proteales
- Family: Proteaceae
- Genus: Leucadendron
- Species: L. tradouwense

Binomial name
- Leucadendron tradouwense I.Williams

Species of plant

Leucadendron tradouwense, the Tradouw conebush, is a flower-bearing shrub belonging to the genus Leucadendron and forms part of the fynbos. The plant is native to the Western Cape, where it occurs in the Langeberg Range at the Tradouws Pass and Groot Vadersbos. The plant is rare, there are only two known populations.

The shrub grows to 2 m in height and flowers in June. The plant dies in fires but the seeds survive. The seeds are stored in a toll on the female plant and fall out of the toll ground after two months, where they are spread by rodents. The plant is unisexual and there are separate plants with male and female flowers, which are pollinated by small towers. The plant grows mainly on steep, southern slopes in sandstone soil at 160–180 m.

In Afrikaans it known as Tradouwtolbos.
