= Dutch Reformed Church, Barrydale =

Church in Barrydale, South Africa

Coordinates: 33.90314°S 20.721748°E

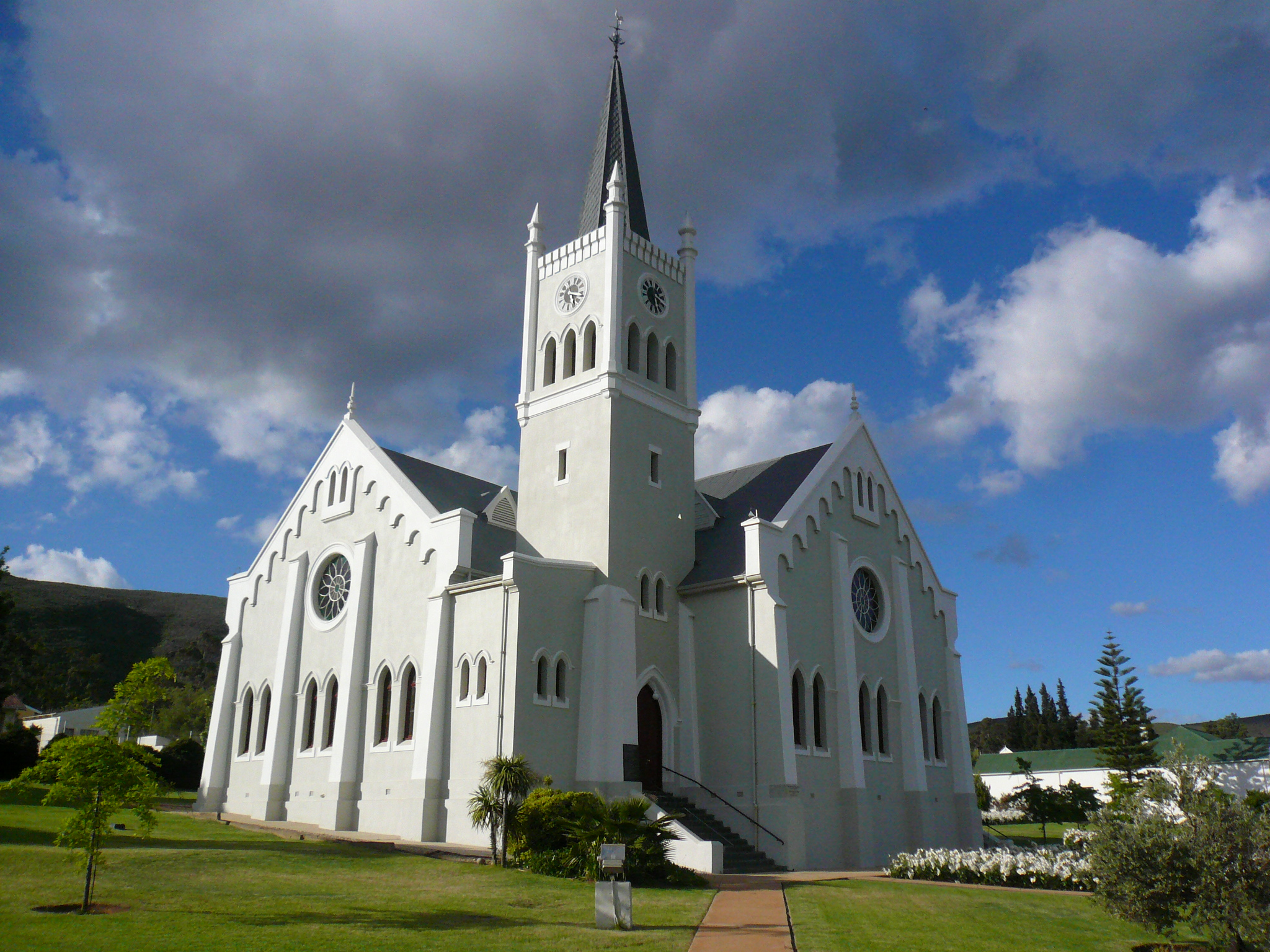

The Dutch Reformed Church in Barrydale is a congregation of the Dutch Reformed Church centered on the village of Barrydale in the picturesque surroundings of the Langeberg on the R62, 62.5 km (38.8 mi) south-east of Montagu, 76 km (47 mi) south-west of Ladismith and more or less equidistant (45 km or 28 mi) through the Tradouw Pass from Swellendam and Heidelberg. In 2014, the congregation had 49 baptized and 211 professing members. In that year the pastor was Rev. W. J. van Zyl.

== Background ==
The merchant family Barry van Swellendam, who played such an important role in the development of the Overberg, Klein-Karoo and surrounding areas, had the village laid out early in the decade after 1880 as a trading post and church center and named it after their ancestor in South Africa, Joseph Barry, the merchant, farmer, shipowner and member of parliament. This area used to be served by the pastor of the Moederkerk in Swellendam, founded in 1798, and the Montagu Reformed Church, founded in 1854, but on September 8, 1880, the establishment of the NG congregation of Barrydale took place. (However, the foundation year is traditionally indicated as 1881.) The first consultant was Rev. Servaas Hofmeyr van Montagu, but due to a new division of rings shortly afterwards, Rev. George Murray of Swellendam appointed as consultant in 1881. He was succeeded in 1885 by Rev. A.B. Daniel of Heidelberg.

== Early years ==
After several years the congregation was led by a religious teacher, D.Z. de Villiers, served, is the first teacher, prop. Pieter Johannes Pienaar, only confirmed in March 1888 (1887 according to Our congregational festival album). Although he was only in the congregation for three or four years and then left for the NG congregation Somerset-Wes where he worked until his retirement in 1936 (it is unknown when he died, but he was still alive in 1952 -edition of the NG Jaarboek and must have been around 90 years old at the time), "he labors with much fruit and does a lot for the formation and building up of the congregation", until he left and was succeeded in 1891 by Rev. J. F. Botha.

This native of Cradock left for Uniondale in 1893 and his two years in the parish of Barrydale were even shorter than his predecessor's service time. After that he successively served Richmond (from 1899), Potchefstroom (from 1905 after he had been out of the ministry for about two years from 1903 and worked for the Bible Society), Jeppestown (from 1908), Tarkastad (from 1912), Wellington (from 1918) and finally Molteno (from 1925 until he accepted his emeritus in 1935). He died on August 9, 1945, in his hometown. The old church, which later served as a mission church, was probably built in Rev. Botha's time built.

From 1893 to 1905, the beloved Rev. GP Van der Merwe. During the Second War of Independence (1899–1902) he rendered many services of love to the congregation. He left the congregation after 12 years of faithful labor, during which a neat and comfortable parsonage was erected, to serve the Church in a wider field of labor as Secretary of the British and Foreign Bible Society. He died in office in 1914.

== 20th century ==
In 1905 the parish welcomed Barrydale plug. Matthys Michielse du Toit as his new teacher. He campaigned a lot in the interest of the mission and "raised a lot of love for the cause of the great King" in the congregation. Rev. Du Toit is a native of the area, as he was born as the eldest son on December 3, 1874, in Montagu. After matriculation, he worked for a time in his father's general merchant business before going to Stellenbosch where he was admitted to the ministry in December 1904. He was pastor here and then at Reddersburg (1912–20), Excelsior (1920–21), Moria in South-West Africa (1921–22), Hopetown (1922–25) and finally Joubertina (1925–41). On March 13, 1906, he married Anna Johanna le Roux (b. September 4, 1879). She died on Sunday evening December 17, 1939, after a long illness of eight months and was buried on Tuesday December 19, 1939, amid great interest above the church on Joubertina. After about 16 months as a single parent, Rev. Du Toit with the widow E.M. the Law of Queenstown faithfully.

The new church building, "so tastefully and comfortably furnished", was erected during his stay in the parish. The church council took the decision to erect a church building and thus replace the old one from 1877 already in 1905 and also decided that the cost should not exceed £5,000. Of the 19 tenders received, that of master builders Moon & Ledbury was the best at £4,518. The parish saved £300 by not employing an architect. Ultimately the building cost came to £5,131. The NG congregation of Montagu donated £350 for the building fund and the NG congregation of Ladismith £176. The building was completed within three years. The cornerstone was laid by Fr. J. W. Louw van Ladismith on March 28, 1908. The English organ, a Norman & Beard from 1908, is one of only three in the country. It was already insured for R500 000 in 1997.

Rev. Du Toit left for Reddersburg in 1912, where he stayed until 1920. His successor at Barrydale was Rev. Willem Francois Petrus Marais, whose first congregation was Dutoitspan from 1896 until his arrival in Barrydale in 1912, where he rendered faithful and devoted service and "left very deep traces". He remained here until he accepted a call in 1928 to the NG congregation of Albanie, then still based in the village of Riebeek-Oos, but in later years in Grahamstad. Rev. Willie Marais died on April 25, 1935.

Barrydale welcomes its sixth teacher in about 40 years with the confirmation of Dr. Gustav Kikillus in 1929. This native of Herbertsdale near Mossel Bay's father came from East Germany to South Africa around 1881 as a missionary of the Berlin Mission Society. He received his education at the Boys' High School in Mossel Bay and in 1905 went to Stellenbosch where he obtained his BA degree at the old Victoria College. In 1908 he went to the Normal School, Cape Town for his teaching diploma. After this he was deputy principal at Tulbagh for 11 years until he returned to Stellenbosch in 1919, studied at the Seminary and obtained his B.D. and passed the candidate exam. In 1922 he left for the Netherlands where he obtained his theological doctorate in 1924 with the thesis "The influence of Christianity on the old Roman legislation regarding the care of the child." On his return to South Africa, he took over as head of the high school at Klipdam and also observed services there during the ministry of Rev. D. Hugo on Barkly West. In 1925 he accepted a call to the NG congregation Nieuwoudtville and in 1929 to Barrydale.

During Rev. Kikillus' ministry is the already ornate church building. A ring wall was installed around the church and a church garden was planted, the sisters of the congregation helped. Mrs. Kikillus, with her expertise, and training in the medical field, played a unique role during that period. Out of the initial six pastors, she served the longest and departed in 1950 to join the NG congregation Bethanie in what was then known as South West Africa.

In 1951, Rev. Gysbert Du Toit Muller confirmed at Barrydale as the congregation's seventh pastor, in what was already his second congregation, after he had stood in the NG congregation of Caledon from 1948. He left Barrydale in 1958 for Cape Town's southern suburbs, where he was pastor of the NG congregation in Rondebosch until 1965. Rev. Muller was born on May 29, 1924, at Bonnievale and received his schooling at Calvinia. He studied at the seminary in Stellenbosch and was legitimized at the end of 1947, after which he began his ministry as an assistant teacher in the NG congregation in Worcester. On September 10, 1948, he was ordained and confirmed as pastor of the NG congregation Caledon. After Barrydale and Rondebosch, he was also in the NG congregation Franschhoek until 1985, where he delivered his farewell message on Sunday February 3, 1985. He has been described as an "inspiring preacher, dedicated pastor and capable community leader".

== Church restoration ==
Barrydale's then nearly 90-year-old NG church building was renovated in 1997 for the third time outside and the second time inside. The church council decided on the major renovation in 1996, as it was last renovated and painted outside and inside in 1962, and in 1978, just before the centenary celebration. A Free State building contractor, Koos du Plooy, from Deltex, took on the task with a team of eight workers. The exterior of the church hall was also renovated and the entire project was completed within two months. It cost about R110,000. A farmer from Barrydale, Johan Marais, collected a total of R22,000 from the local community and the rest came from the church council's reserve fund. The church building's imported ceiling of pattern-printed steel panels was painted in 1996 for the first time since the building of the church. The height of the church roof and tower made the painting difficult, because erecting the high scaffolding was time-consuming. Some roof tiles that were weathered were replaced. The weather vane, which had been standing on a skewer over the years, was also repaired. The steel pin on which the rooster stands was previously in a wooden base that had weathered. With the repairs, the rooster got a steel pedestal.

== Ministers ==
- Pieter Johannes Pienaar, Maart 1888 tot 1891
- Johannes Francois Botha, 1891 tot 1893
- Gideon Petrus van der Merwe, 1893 tot 1905
- Matthys Michielse du Toit, 1905 tot 1912
- Willem Francois Petrus Marais, 1912 tot 1929
- Dr. Gustave Theodore Tobias Kikillus, 1929 tot 1950
- Gysbert Du Toit Muller, 1951 tot 1958
- Pieter Lafras Cilliers, 1958 tot einde 1961
- Jacobus Ernst Terblanche, 9 Augustus 1964 tot Desember 1969
- Daniël Wilhelm Olivier, April 1970 tot 1976
- Hermanus (Maans) van Lill, April 15, 1977, tot Maart 1984
- Johannes Frederick Maasdorp, 1984 tot minstens 1990
- W.J. van Zyl, February 10, 2013 –
