= R323 road =

R323 road may refer to:

- R323 road (Ireland)
- R323 road (South Africa)
