= Olivedale, Western Cape =

Situated halfway between Cape Town, South Africa and George, you will find Olivedale. It is a small farming community located at the foot of the Langeberg Mountains and marks the spot where the Buffeljagsriver and the Breede River meet. The entrance to Olivedale (turning right on the N2 after passing Swellendam direction George) has a display of farm implements from the days of yore, with cattle roaming free and fruit orchards turning the area into different shades of pink and purple from September.

The Olivedale, (Buffeljagsriver) area is a fertile region producing vegetables, citrus, persimmons, canola, milk and even lavender and peppers. Olivedale has its own local cheese factory, wine cellar and a rich history of old folk tales.

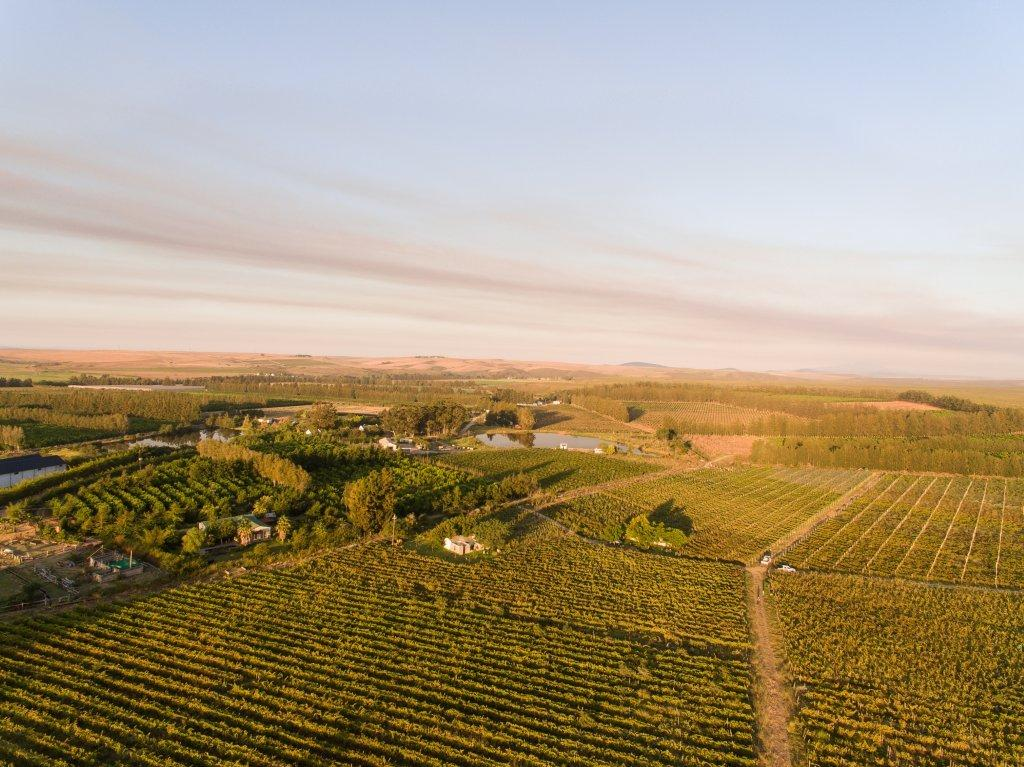
Olivedale Farms 2017

Establishment of the Farming District

The Trek Boers started expanding from the Cape Colony and the governing body of the VOC in the early 1700s. The first farm to be established in the wider Swellendam/Buffeljags area was Jan Harmse in 1723 (now Nooitgedacht) and Roelof Olofsz at Grootvadersbosch. In 1731 Andre Schutte established himself at Potteberg and Dirk Cornelius Uys was the first Farmer in Bufflejagsriver. Reasons for leaving the secure vicinity of Cape Town and Stellenbosch included the need for independence from the VOC.

Until 1743 the farmers from the "verre afgeleegene districten" (as it was known by the VOC) lived very much in isolation as the nearest church and landdrost from Olivedale, Buffeljagsriver, was in Stellenbosch, which was not only a far way to travel but also very dangerous.

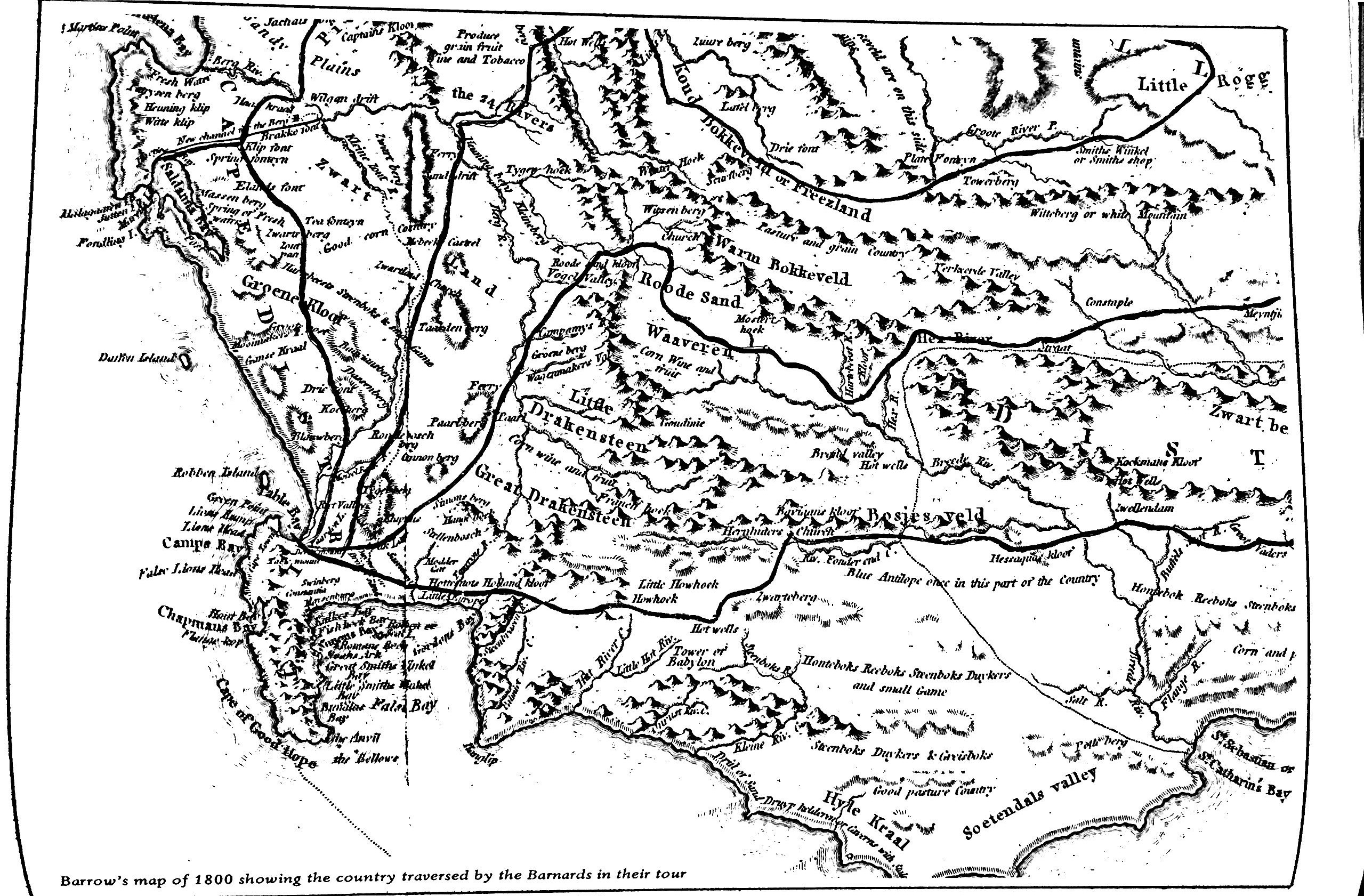
Trade routes to Olivedale, Buffeljagsiver 1800s

In January 1743 the Baron Gustaf William van Imhoff visited the Cape Colony on his way to Netherlands-East-Indie. He inspected the "Colonie in de verre afgeleegene districten" and recommended that it must be proclaimed as a district under the VOC. So the nearby town of Swellendam was born.

Olivedale, Buffeljagsrivier district was mainly livestock based including cattle and fat tailed sheep, which were later cross bred with Spanish Marinos to produce wool for export.

As early as 1803 the Buffeljagsriver area was known for the pure bred horses. Landdrost Faure owned a pure bred horse farm, named Rotterdam. Horse breeding led to the establishment of the Swellendam Farmsers Association in 1838.

== See also ==
- Buffeljags River
- Antonie se klip
