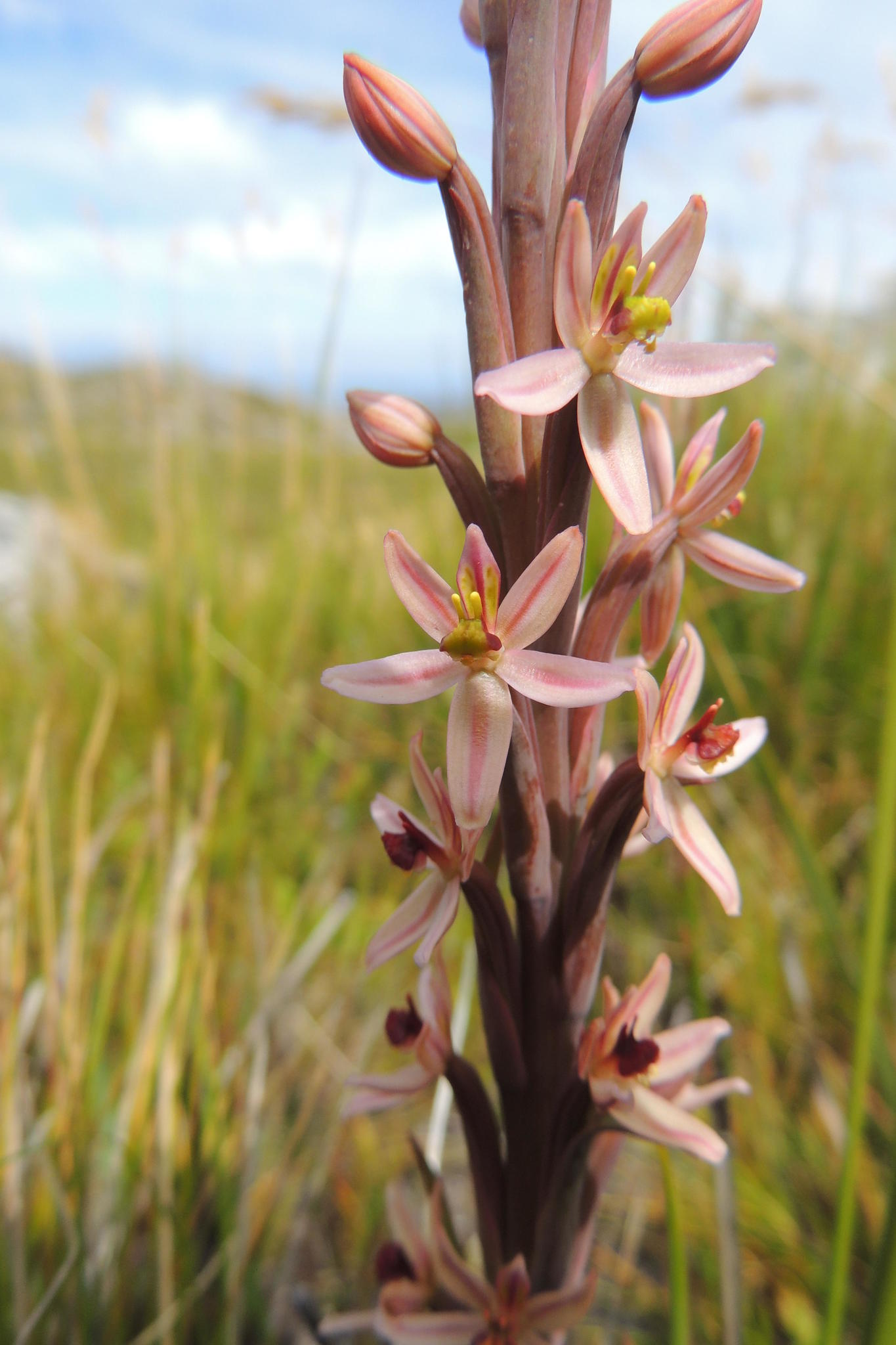

Conservation status
- CITES Appendix II

Scientific classification
- Kingdom: Plantae
- Clade: Tracheophytes
- Clade: Angiosperms
- Clade: Monocots
- Order: Asparagales
- Family: Orchidaceae
- Subfamily: Orchidoideae
- Genus: Pachites
- Species: P. appressus

Binomial name
- Pachites appressus Lindl.

= Pachites appressus =

Species of flowering plant

Pachites appressus is a species of orchid native to the Langberg mountains in the Western Cape Province of South Africa.
