= Zeuktophyllum suppositum =

Scientific classification
- Kingdom: Plantae
- Clade: Tracheophytes
- Clade: Angiosperms
- Clade: Eudicots
- Order: Caryophyllales
- Family: Aizoaceae
- Genus: Zeuktophyllum
- Species: Z. suppositum

Binomial name
- Zeuktophyllum suppositum (L.Bolus) N.E.Br.

Synonyms
- Mesembryanthemum suppositum L.Bolus

Species of succulent

Zeuktophyllum suppositum is a succulent plant that is part of the Aizoaceae family. The species is endemic to the Western Cape and occurs from Barrydale to Calitzdorp. The plant has a range of 999 km^{2} and is threatened by overgrazing and illegal collection.
