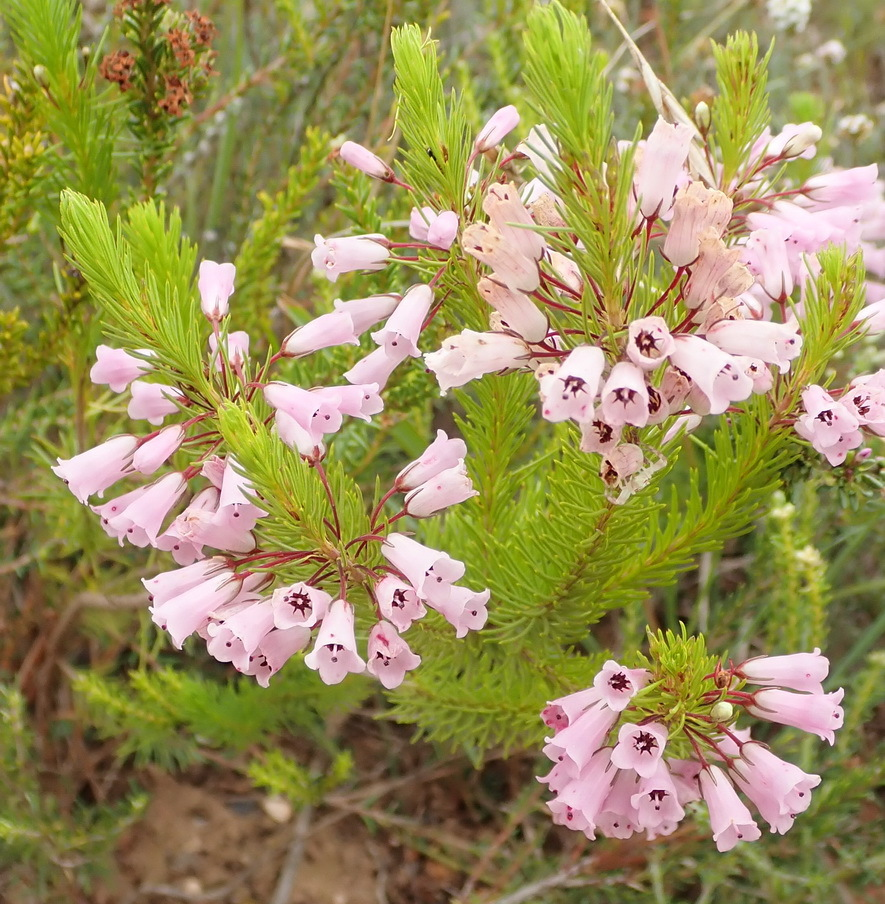

Scientific classification
- Kingdom: Plantae
- Clade: Tracheophytes
- Clade: Angiosperms
- Clade: Eudicots
- Clade: Asterids
- Order: Ericales
- Family: Ericaceae
- Genus: Erica
- Species: E. filamentosa

Binomial name
- Erica filamentosa Andrews, (1804)

Synonyms
- Ericoides filamentosa (Andrews) Kuntze; Syringodea filamentosa D.Don

= Erica filamentosa =

Species of flowering plant

Erica filamentosa is a plant belonging to the genus Erica and forming part of the fynbos. The species is endemic to the Western Cape where it occurs from Swellendam to Suurbraak. The plant's range is 24 km^{2} and there are only two populations and its habitat is threatened by agricultural activities.
