= Erica setulosa =

Scientific classification
- Kingdom: Plantae
- Clade: Tracheophytes
- Clade: Angiosperms
- Clade: Eudicots
- Clade: Asterids
- Order: Ericales
- Family: Ericaceae
- Genus: Erica
- Species: E. setulosa

Binomial name
- Erica setulosa Benth.

Synonyms
- Ericoides setulosum (Benth.) Kuntze

Species of flowering plant

Erica setulosa is a plant belonging to the genus Erica and is part of the fynbos. The species is endemic to the Western Cape. It occurs in the Langeberg, Klein-Swartberg and Rooiberg. The plant grows at high altitudes on rocky ledges and slopes. The plant is considered rare.
