= Misty Point =

Mountain in Italy

- Location within South Africa

Highest point
- Elevation: 1,710 m (5,610 ft)
- Coordinates: 33°57′23″S 20°26′07″E

Geography
- Location: Western Cape, South Africa

Misty Point is a 1,710 m (5,610 ft) tall mountain of the Langeberg in the Western Cape province of South Africa.

== Description ==
The mountain belongs to the Langeberg, a range that extends longitudinally parallel to the coast and forms part of the larger Cape Fold Belt mountain system. The summit is located inland from Swellendam and is the second-highest peak in the Langeberg after Keeromsberg (2,075 m, 6,808 ft), as well as the highest peak in the eastern section of the range. Nearby summits include Hermitage Peak and Goedgeloof.

== Nature protection ==
The mountain lies within the boundaries of the Marloth Nature Reserve, which has been part of the UNESCO Cape Floral Region Protected Areas World Heritage Site since the site extension in 2015.
