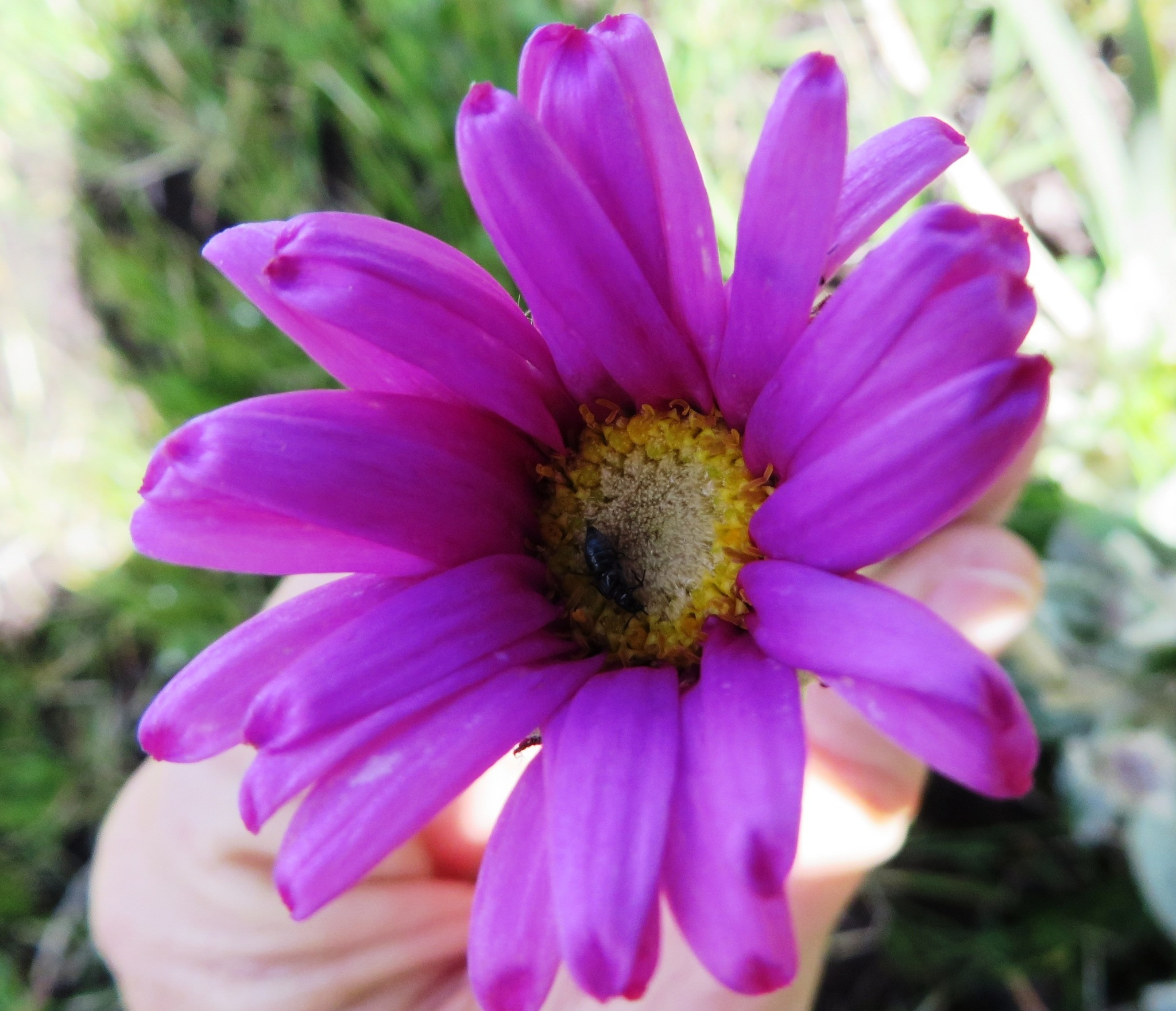

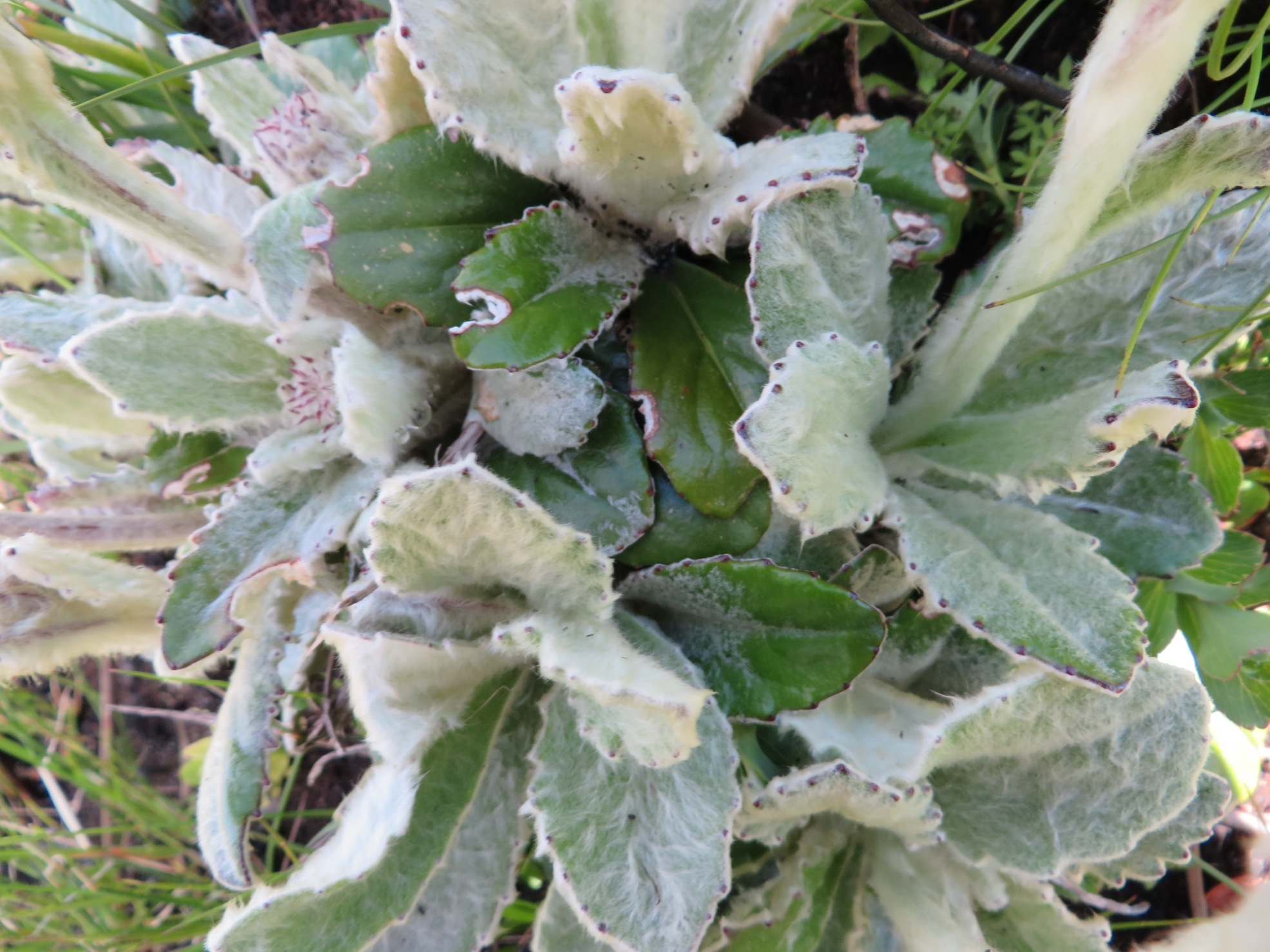

Scientific classification
- Kingdom: Plantae
- Clade: Tracheophytes
- Clade: Angiosperms
- Clade: Eudicots
- Clade: Asterids
- Order: Asterales
- Family: Asteraceae
- Genus: Mairia
- Species: M. robusta

Binomial name
- Mairia robusta (Zinnecker-Wiegand) J.C.Manning & Goldblatt

Synonyms
- M. hirsuta subsp. robusta

= Mairia robusta =

Perennial plant in the daisy family from South Africa

Mairia robusta is a tufted, white-woolly, perennial, herbaceous plant of up to 30 cm (1 ft) high, that is assigned to the family Asteraceae. It has large, robust, hard and leathery leaves, with a white woolly hairy, nontransparent underside, while the felty hairs on the top are lost with age. Only at a few occasions, flowers have been observed, in June, October and December, always after a fire. The flower heads sit individually at the tip of white-woolly scapes, with 14–16 purplish pink to white ray florets surrounding a yellow disc. M. robusta is an endemic species that is restricted to rocky mountain slopes in the Western Cape province of South Africa.

== Taxonomy ==
This species of fire daisy was described based on a specimen collected by Elsie Elizabeth Esterhuysen in 1973 in the Jonkershoek Mountains near Stellenbosch at an altitude of about 915 m (3,002 ft). It was first recognised as a separate taxon by Ulricke Zinnecker-Wiegand in 2011, who regarded it a subspecies and named it M. hirsuta subsp. robusta. In 2012, John Manning and Peter Goldblatt raised it to the rank of species making the combination M. robusta.

== Description ==
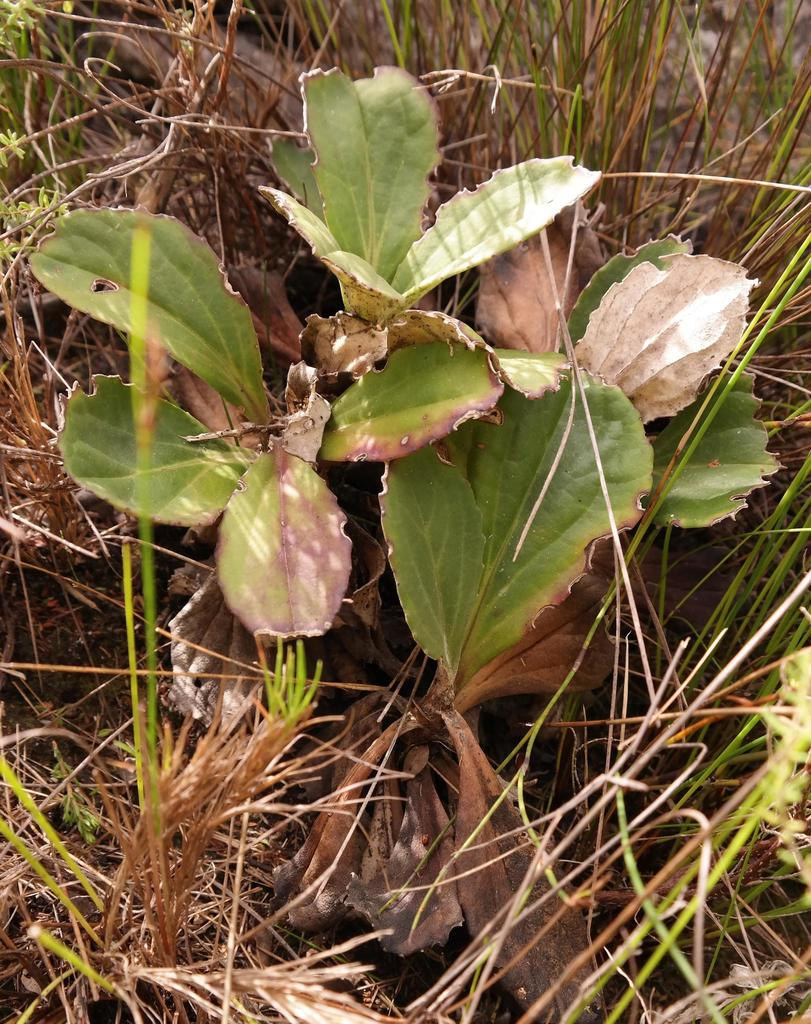
aged leaves

Mairia robusta is a perennial, herbaceous plant of up to 30 cm (1 ft) high. Its leaves are all in a rosettes at the base. The leaf blade is narrowly to broadly inverted egg-shaped or narrowly to broadly ellipse-shaped, 4–13 cm (1 3/5–5 1/5 in) long and 1 1/2–3 cm (0.6–1.2 in) wide, narrowed at its foot into a broad petiole-like base, with a blunt or pointy tip, a wavy toothed margin in the upper half, or sometimes almost entire with a few peg-like teeth. The upper surface is initially woolly, sometimes white-woolly, but the hairs are lost with age. The lower surface has two layers of hairs, a dense, persistent, soft, white or pinkish, cobweb-like layer that is overlaid by longer woolly hairs. The lower leaf surface is not visible through the layers of hairs.

In each rosette, there is mostly just one, unbranched flower stalk of up to about 26 cm (10 in), with the same indumentum as the leaf lower surface, with several line-shaped to triangularly line-shaped bracts of up to 4 1/2 cm (1.8 in) long, decreasing in size upwards, with a single flower head at its tip. The bracts that jointly surround the florets in the same head form a broadly bell-shaped involucre of about 3 1/2 cm (1.4 in) in diameter. The line-shaped bracts have the same indumentum as the underside of the leaves, except for the (eventually) hairless base of the inner bracts. They are arranged in five to six whorls, each 11 1/2–17 mm (0.45–0.67 in) long and 3/4-1 1/2 mm (0.03–0.06 in) wide, with purplish, pointed or stretched tips. The involucre envelops the base of fourteen to sixteen bright purplish pink, pink or white, female ray florets have a strap of about 3 cm (1 1/5 in) long, with a tube of about 1/2 cm (0.2 in) long that carries glandular hairs. The style of the ray florets is about 1/2 cm (0.2 in) long and the two line-shaped branches in which it splits are 1.0–1.4 mm (0.039–0.055 in) long. In this species, staminodes in the ray florets are absent. The ray florets encircle many yellow disc florets. The lower part of the disc florets consist of a tube of 5.5–7 mm (0.22–0.28 in) long, set with glandular hairs, the five lobes at the top are about 1 mm (0.039 in) long. The disc florets contain both inferior ovaries topped by a forked style and five fertile anthers that form a tube around the style shaft. These anthers are about 2 mm (0.079 in) long, and have triangular appendages at their tip of about 0.5 mm (0.020 in) long. The style of the disc florets is about 5.5–6 mm (0.22–0.24 in) long and the two line-shaped branches in which it splits are 1.0–1.5 mm (0.039–0.059 in) long and have a delta-shaped appendage at both tips.

Surrounding the base of the corollas of both ray and disc florets are two whorls of white to straw-coloured pappus bristles. The outer whorl consists free barbed bristles of 0.5–3.5 mm (0.020–0.138 in) long, alternating with the pappus of the inner whorl. The inner whorl consists of feathery bristles of 6.7–7.0 mm (0.26–0.28 in) long, with or without barbs and fused at their base in a ring. The pappus extends beyond the disc floret tubes. The eventually brown, dry, one-seeded, indehiscent fruits called cypselae are cylindrical to spindle-shaped, rarely egg-shaped in outline, about 3 1/2–4 1/2 mm (0.14–0.18 in) long and 0.9–2 mm (0.035–0.079 in) wide, with four or five prominently raised, mostly dark brown ribs. The cypselae of both ray and disc florets are covered with many shiny yellowish glands. They are also covered in dense, silky twin hairs of about 0.4–0.5 mm (0.016–0.020 in) long, which are cleft deeply and have two almost equally long branches. The seed skin has no further adornment.

=== Differences with ===
Mairia robusta can be distinguished from M. hirsuta by its large, robust, hard and leathery leaves, with a white woolly hairy, nontransparent underside.

== Distribution, ecology and conservation ==
Mairia robusta can be found from Bainskloof Pass in the north, through Stellenbosch Mountain and the Hottentots Holland Mountains, to the coast near the Kogelberg in the south. It grows on the upper rocky slopes near the summit in a fynbos vegetation. Although the distribution range of this species is restricted to about 1,100 km^{2} (420 sq mi), it occurs in well-protected mountains, and it is therefore considered a species of least concern.
