= Buffeljagsrivier =

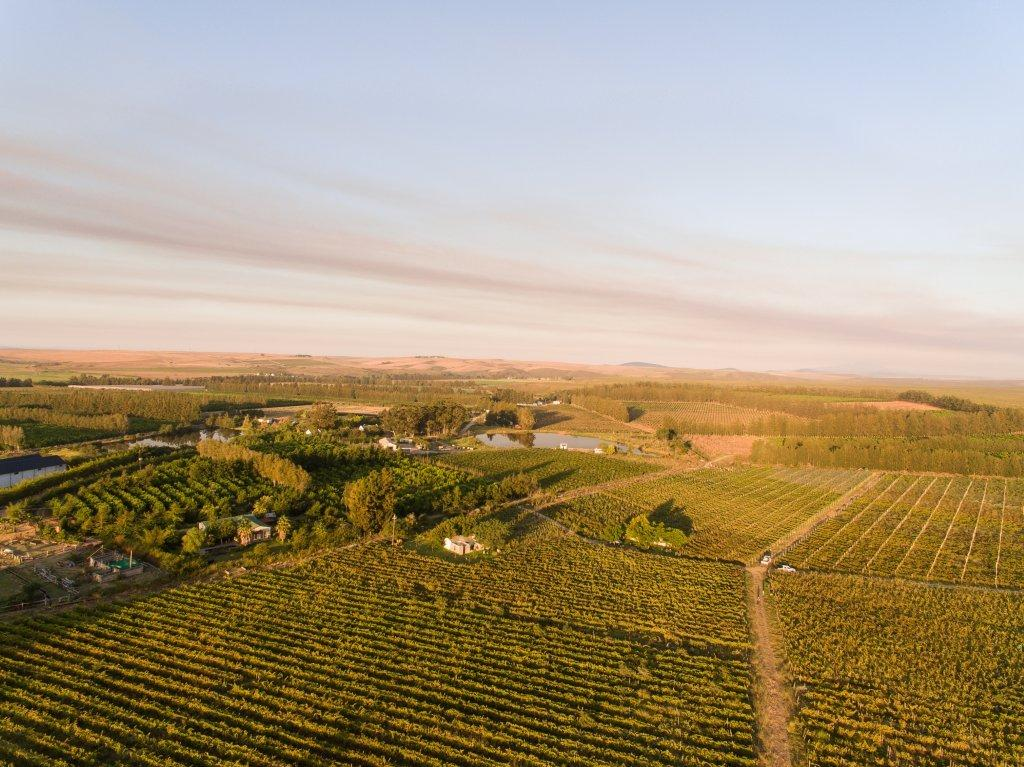
- View of the town

- Location within Western Cape Location within South Africa
- Coordinates: 34°02′52″S 20°31′29″E
- Country: South Africa
- Province: Western Cape
- District: Overberg
- Municipality: Swellendam
- Named for: Buffeljags River

Population (2011)
  - Total: 1,439

Racial Makeup (2011)
  - Coloured: 92.4%
  - Black African: 5.5%
  - White: 1.5%
  - Other: 0.6%

First Languages (2011)
  - Afrikaans: 94.5%
  - English: 1.7%
  - Xhosa: 1.5%
  - Other: 2.4%
- Time zone: UTC+2 (SAST)

Buffeljagsrivier is a small town in the Swellendam Local Municipality in the Western Cape of South Africa. The town gets its name from the Buffeljags River. The town is about 7 km east of Swellendam and 13 km south-west of Suurbraak.

As of 2011, the town's population was 1,439 people living in 355 households.
