= R321 (South Africa) =

Regional route in South Africa

Regional route R321
- R321 route map

Major junctions
- North end: N2
- South end: R45

Location
- Country: South Africa

Highway system
- Numbered routes of South Africa
← R320	→ R322

The R321 is a Regional Route in South Africa that connects Grabouw in the south-west to the R45 between Franschhoek and Villiersdorp in the north-east.

From its southern origin at the N2, it runs along the eastern edge of Grabouw heading north-east. It crosses the dam wall of Theewaterskloof Dam after which it immediately ends, reaching the R45.

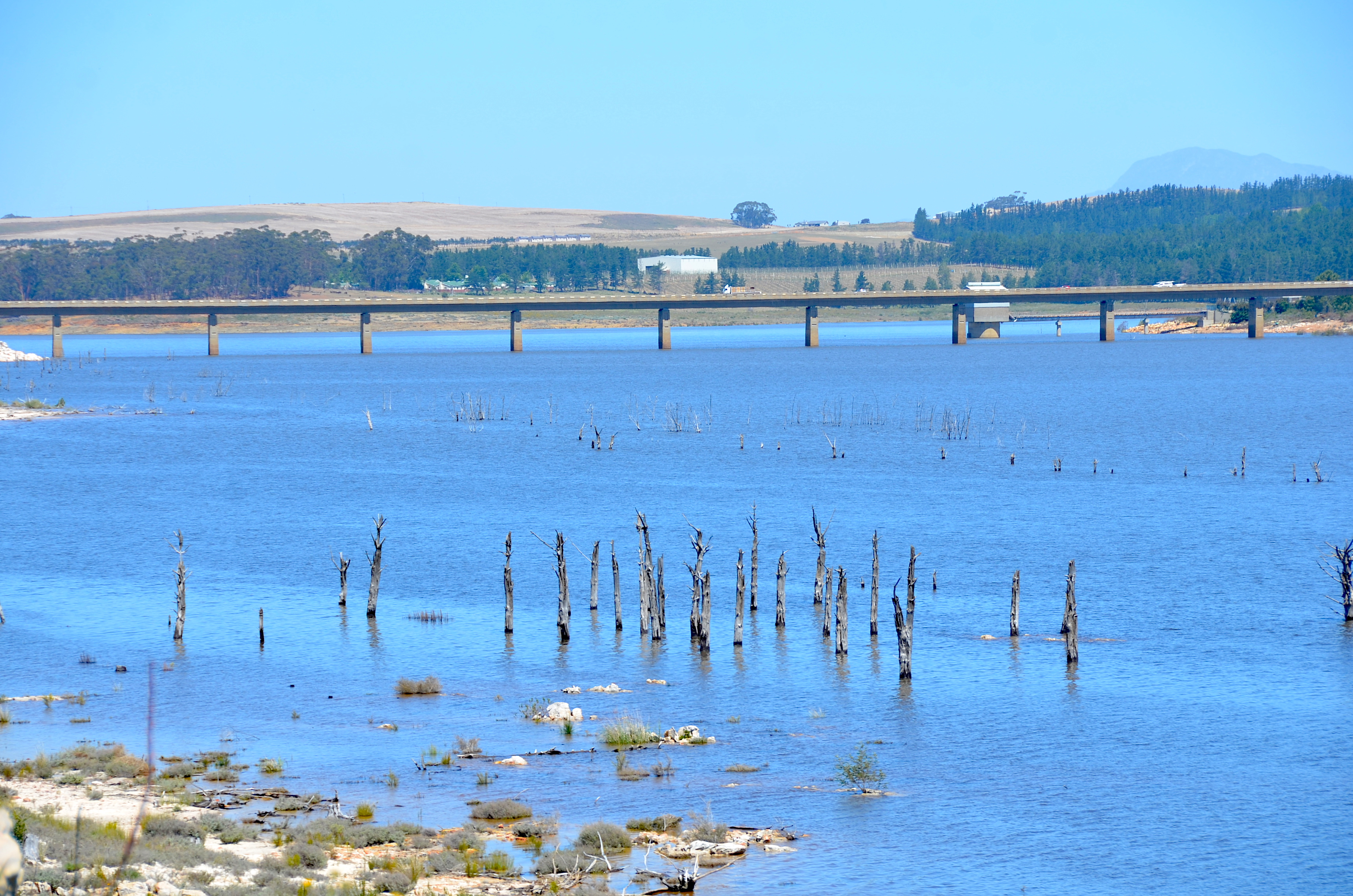
Regional Route 321 across Theewaterskloof Dam
