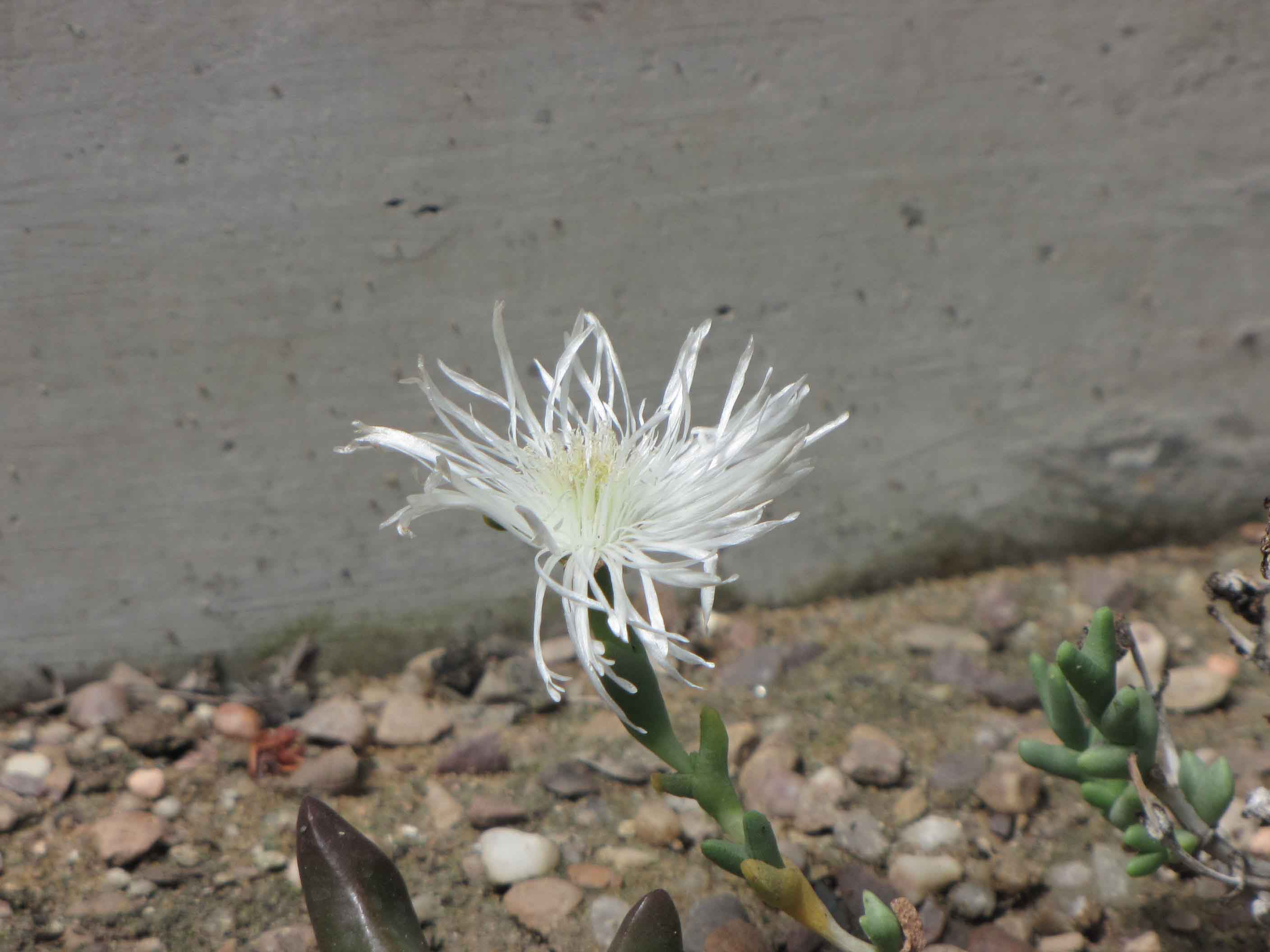

Scientific classification
- Kingdom: Plantae
- Clade: Tracheophytes
- Clade: Angiosperms
- Clade: Eudicots
- Order: Caryophyllales
- Family: Aizoaceae
- Genus: Zeuktophyllum
- Species: Z. calycinum

Binomial name
- Zeuktophyllum calycinum (L.Bolus) H.E.K.Hartmann

Synonyms
- Mesembryanthemum separatum N.E.Br.; Octopoma calycinum (L.Bolus) L.Bolus; Ruschia calycina L.Bolus

= Zeuktophyllum calycinum =

Species of succulent

Zeuktophyllum calycinum is a succulent plant that is part of the Aizoaceae family. The species is endemic to the Western Cape.
