= Marloth Nature Reserve =

Nature reserve in South Africa

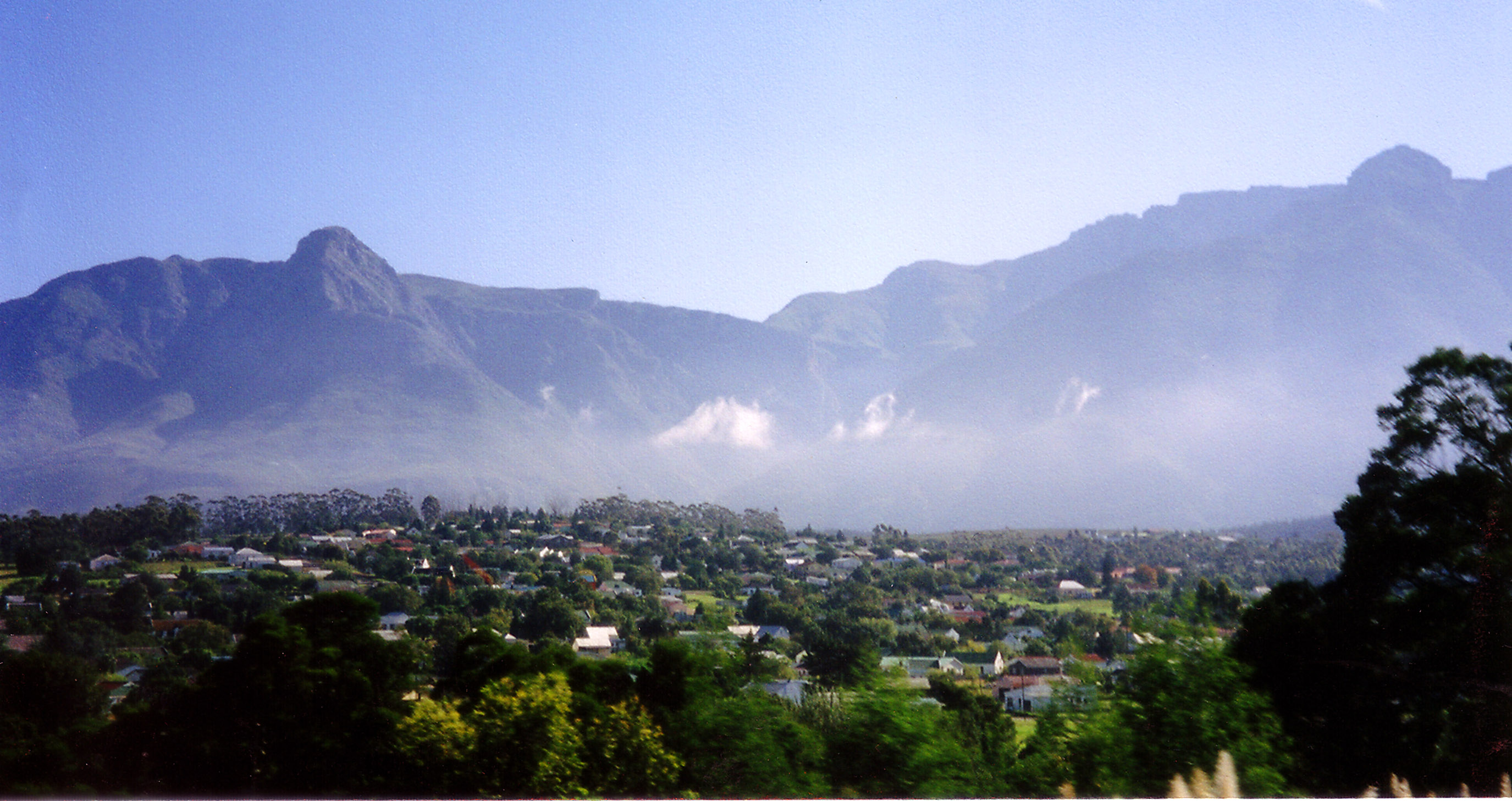
- View over Swellendam of the Clock Peaks in the Marloth Nature Reserve

- Location within Western Cape
- Location: Langeberg, Western Cape, South Africa
- Nearest city: Swellendam
- Coordinates: 33°58′S 20°25′E
- Area: 141.23 km^{2} (54.53 sq mi)
- Established: 1928
- Governing body: CapeNature
- Website: www.capenature.org.za/reserves.htm?reserve=Marloth+Nature+Reserve

Marloth Nature Reserve is a nature reserve in Swellendam Local Municipality, Western Cape, South Africa. It conserves the central Langeberg mountains, between the towns of Swellendam, Ashton, Barrydale and Suurbraak. The reserve includes the Clock Peaks, two prominent landmarks near Swellendam.

The reserve measures 14,123 ha (34,900 acres; 141.23 km^{2}; 54.53 sq mi) in extent and is managed together with another 16,532 ha (40,850 acres; 165.32 km^{2}; 63.83 sq mi) of privately owned proclaimed mountain catchment land. The reserve's office is approximately 15 km (9.3 mi) from Swellendam and adjacent to the Swellendam State Forest.

It is named after Rudolf Marloth, a South African botanist.

== See also ==
- Protected areas of South Africa
- South African National Parks
