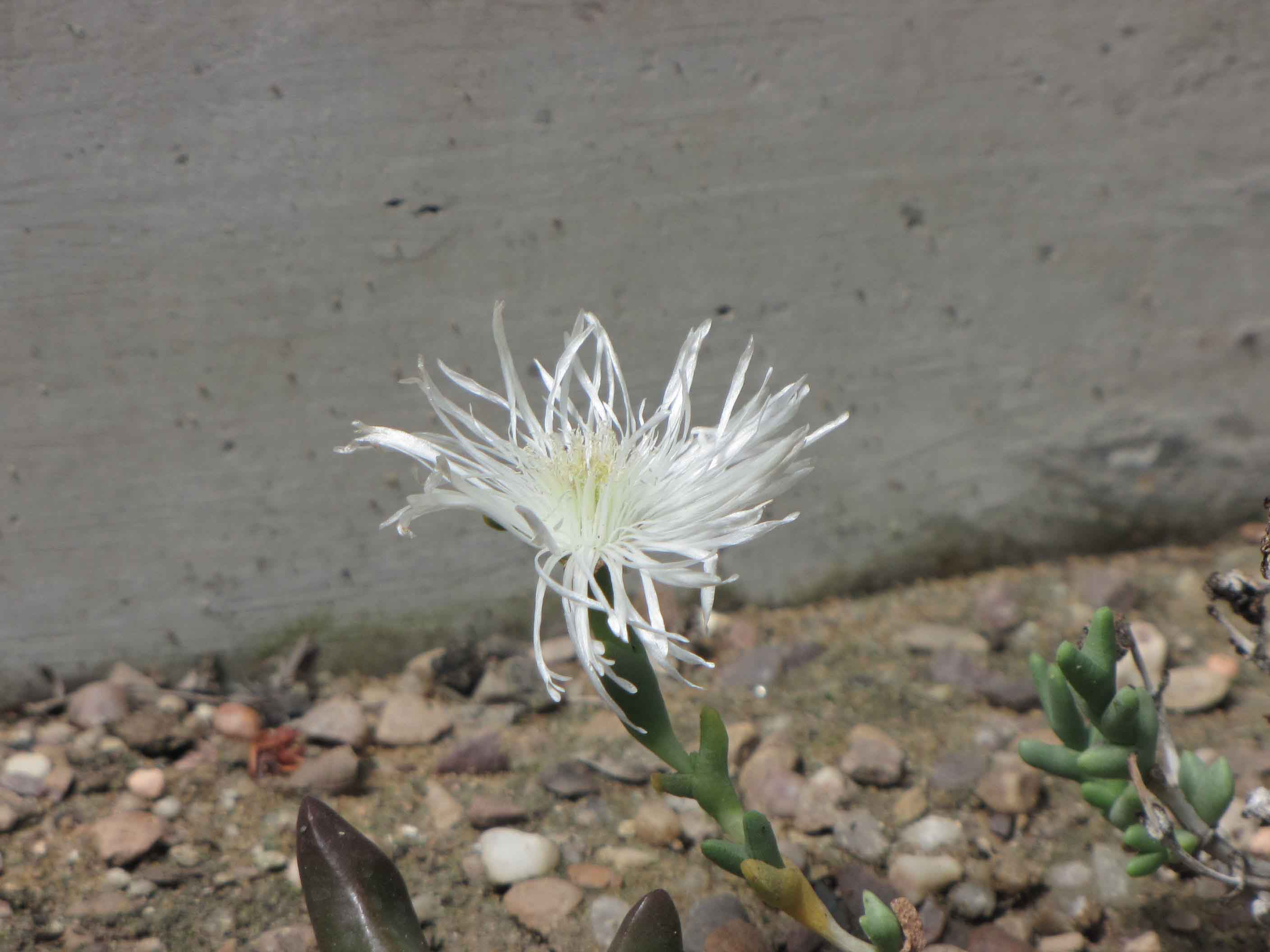
- Zeuktophyllum calycinum

Scientific classification
- Kingdom: Plantae
- Clade: Tracheophytes
- Clade: Angiosperms
- Clade: Eudicots
- Order: Caryophyllales
- Family: Aizoaceae
- Subfamily: Ruschioideae
- Tribe: Ruschieae
- Genus: Zeuktophyllum; N.E.Br.

= Zeuktophyllum =

Genus of succulents

Zeuktophyllum is a genus of succulent plants in the family Aizoaceae. It includes two species endemic to the Cape Provinces of South Africa.

- Zeuktophyllum calycinum (L.Bolus) H.E.K.Hartmann
- Zeuktophyllum suppositum (L.Bolus) N.E.Br.
