= R323 (South Africa) =

Regional route in South Africa

Regional route R323
- R323 route map

Route information
- Length: 69 km (43 mi)

Major junctions
- Nouth end: R62 near Ladismith
- Sorth end: N2 in Riversdale

Location
- Country: South Africa

Highway system
- Numbered routes of South Africa
← R322	→ R324

The R323 is a Regional Route in South Africa that connects Riversdale in the south with Laingsburg in the north.

== Route ==
Its southern origin is from the N2 at Riversdale. It traverses the town, and leaves heading north. It runs through Garcia's Pass and eventually reaches an intersection with the R62 near Ladismith. From this intersection, it is briefly co-signed with the R62 heading east, before again diverging, heading west-north-west. After about 50 km it loops around to eventually head east before veering north towards Laingsburg. Before reaching the town, it crosses the Rooinek Pass. The route ends in Laingsburg at the N1.
