= Port Beaufort =

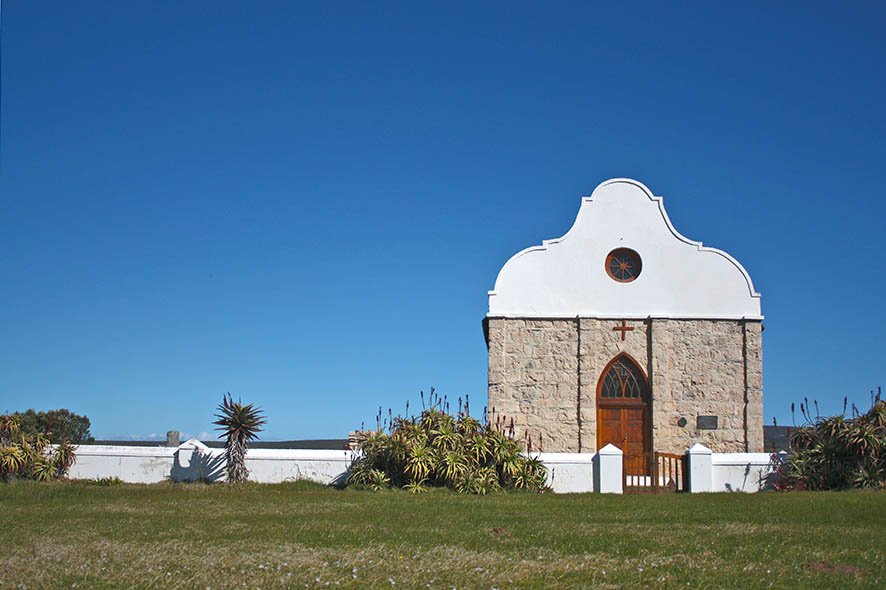
- Barry Church, Port Beaufort

- Location within Western Cape Location within South Africa
- Coordinates: 34°23′45″S 20°49′25″E
- Country: South Africa
- Province: Western Cape
- District: Garden Route
- Municipality: Hessequa

Area
  - Total: 2.71 km^{2} (1.05 sq mi)

Population (2011)
  - Total: 321
  - Density: 118/km^{2} (307/sq mi)

Racial makeup (2011)
  - Black African: 9.7%
  - Coloured: 2.2%
  - White: 87.2%
  - Other: 0.9%

First languages (2011)
  - Afrikaans: 72.3%
  - English: 26.0%
  - Other: 1.6%
- Time zone: UTC+2 (SAST)

Port Beaufort is a settlement in Garden Route District Municipality in the Western Cape province of South Africa.

== History ==
It is a seaside resort, formerly also a harbour, on the north bank of the Breede River estuary. The settlement was named after Henry Somerset, 5th Duke of Beaufort, the father of Lord Charles Somerset.

Joseph Barry's business had a large influence on the city. He came from London to South Africa in 1819 and quickly saw that it was easier to transport goods by sea between Cape Town and the Overberg. It took oxcarts three weeks to travel from Cape Town to Swellendam. Barry immediately built a harbour on the north shore of the Breede River, which became Port Beaufort.

Once boats crossed the sandbank by the mouth of the river, they could travel 40 km upriver to Malgas, where Barry also built a wharf and warehouse. After several ships sank near the mouth of the river and lost their cargo, Barry commissioned the construction in Scotland of a 150-ton steamship called the Kadie, which proceeded to successfully navigate the estuary for six years, until November 17, 1865, when it too foundered on the rocks on the southern shore. Barry's empire collapsed the following year, as the arrival of the railways eliminated the need for this sea route.

The town of Witsand is nearby.
