= Tradouw Pass =

Mountain pass in the Langeberg, Western Cape, South Africa

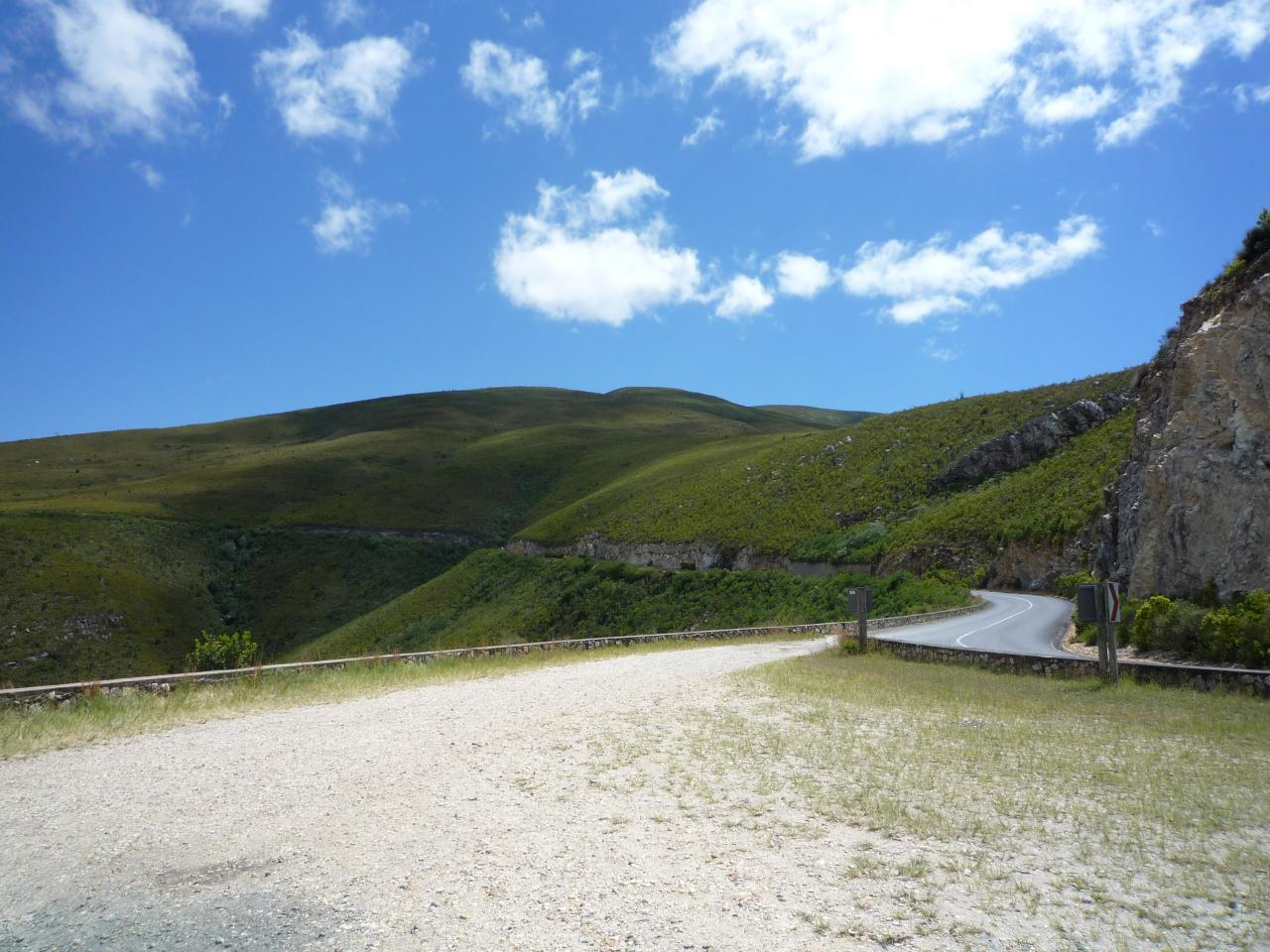
- The Tradouw Pass in South Africa, linking Barrydale with Swellendam and Heidelberg through the Langeberg Mountains.
- Elevation: 351 m (1,152 ft)
- Length: 14 kilometres (8.7 mi)
- Traversed by: R324

Third Approach
- Location: Swellendam, Western Cape, South Africa
- Range: Langeberg
- Coordinates: 33°58′32.2″S 20°42′06.6″E
- Tradouw Pass (Western Cape)

Tradouw Pass is a pass through the Langeberg mountain range in South Africa. It is part of the R324 and is the main road between Swellendam and Barrydale in the Western Cape.

== History ==
In 1868, the Cape administration decided to build a road through the pass and appointed Thomas Bain to construct the route. It was built by convict labour. On 27 October 1873, Cape Governor Sir Henry Barkly opened the route and named it Southey Pass after magistrate Robert Southey. The name was not popular, and the current name stuck.

Its name is derived from the Khoi words tarras, 'women' and doas, 'poort or the way through'; who first used the route through the Langeberg.
