= Barrydale =

- Town
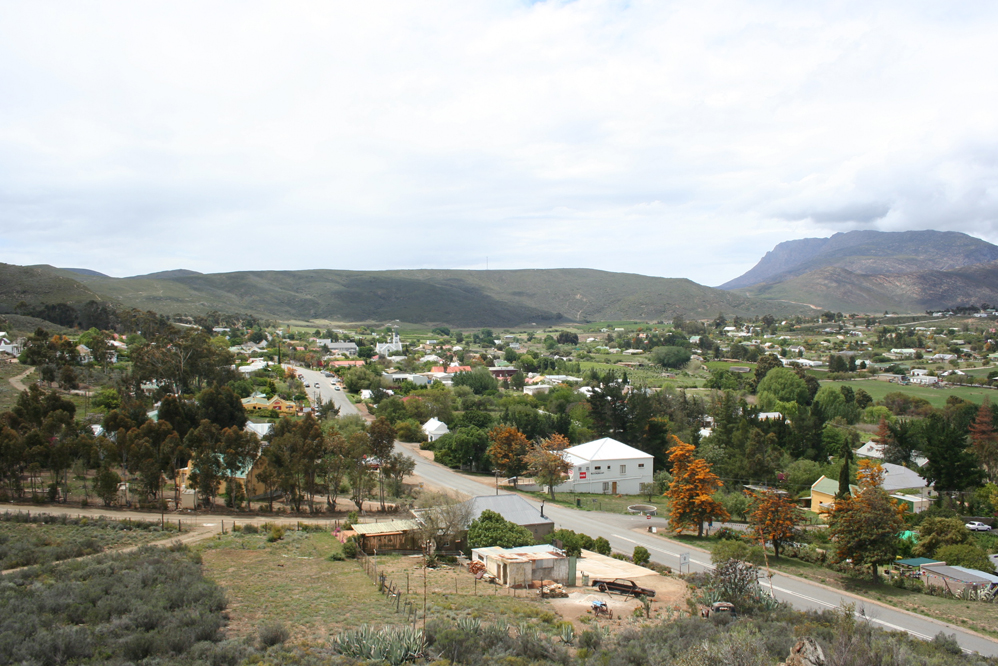
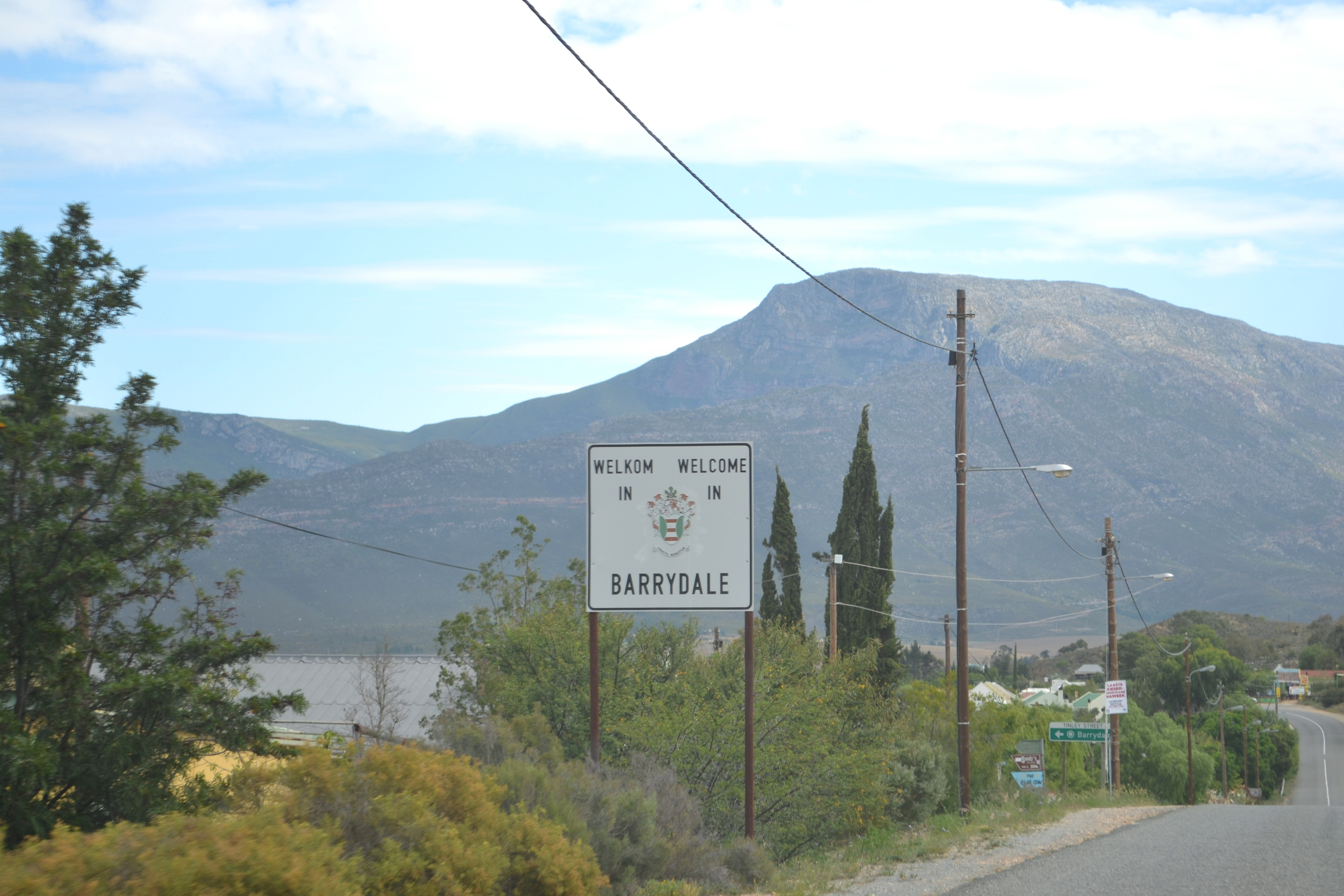
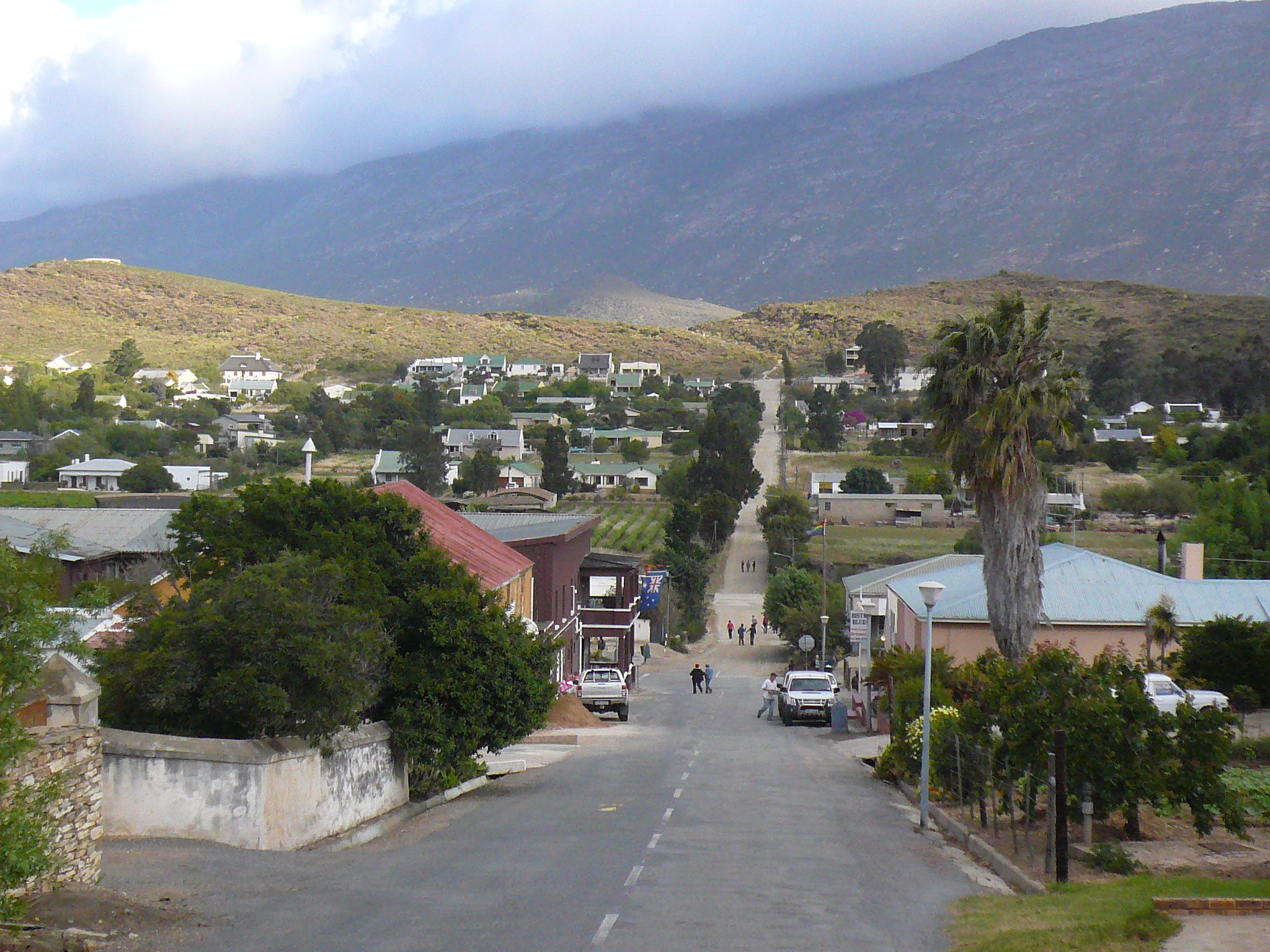
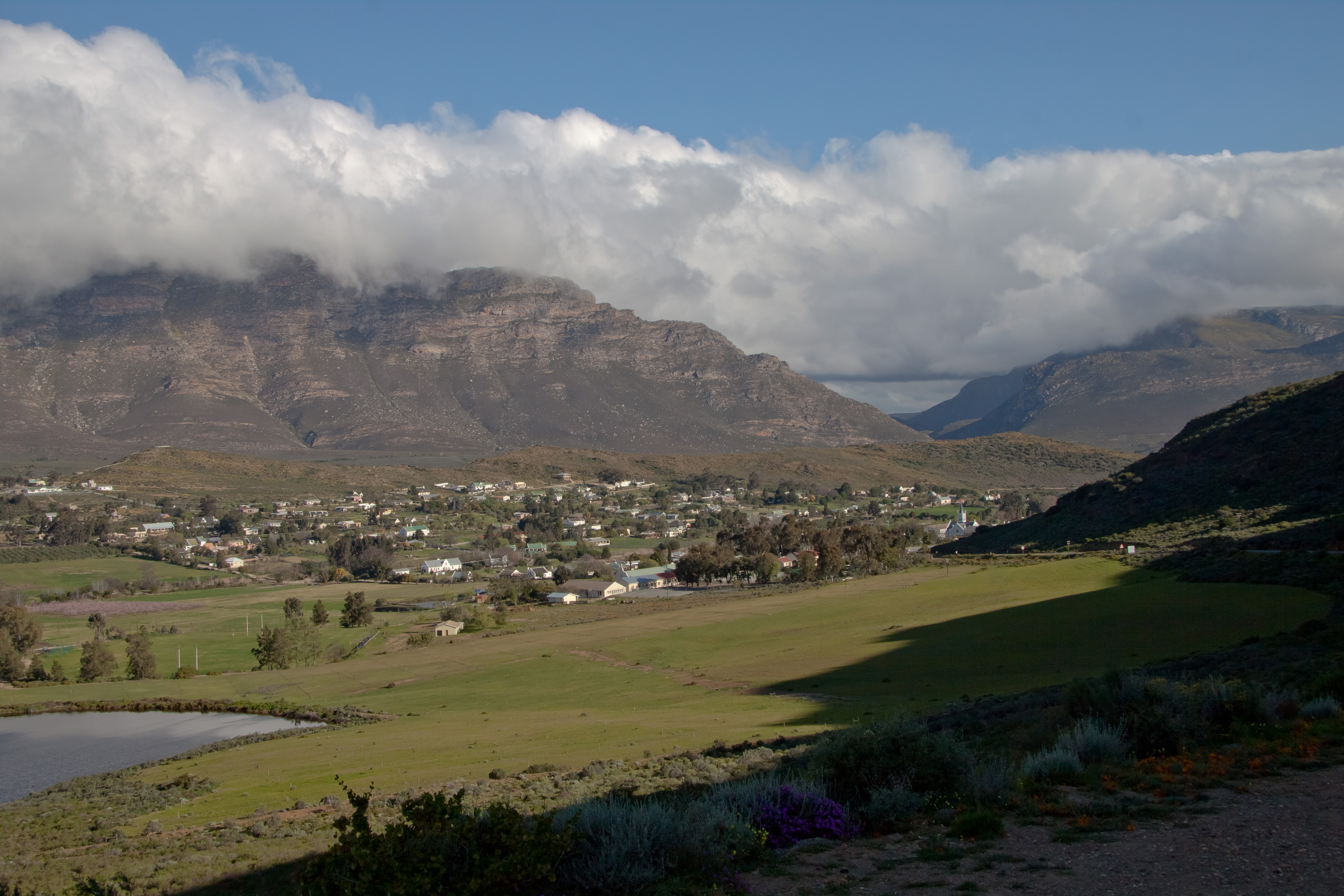
- Skyline Welcome sign Laing Street View from R62 towards Barrydale and the Tradouws Pass

- Location within Western Cape Location within South Africa
- Coordinates: 33°54′13″S 20°43′18″E
- Country: South Africa
- Province: Western Cape
- District: Overberg
- Municipality: Swellendam
- Ward: 2
- First settled: 1832
- Established: 1878
- Recognised: 1881

Area
  - Total: 25.77 km^{2} (9.95 sq mi)

Population (2011)
  - Total: 4,156
  - Estimate (2022): 9,322
  - Density: 161.3/km^{2} (417.7/sq mi)

Racial makeup (2011)
  - Black African: 3.6%
  - Coloured: 83.3%
  - Indian/Asian: 0.4%
  - White: 11.9%
  - Other: 0.8%

First languages (2011)
  - Afrikaans: 90.6%
  - English: 6.6%
  - Xhosa: 1.1%
  - Other: 1.7%
- Time zone: UTC+2 (SAST)
- Postal code (street): 6750
- PO box: 6750
- Area code: 028

Barrydale is a small town in the Western Cape province of South Africa. It lies in the Tradouw Valley, between the Overberg region and the Little Karoo, along the R62 route.

It is located about 60 km east of Montagu and 50 km north of Swellendam. It sits at the foot of the Langeberg mountain range, and is situated at the northern end of the Tradouws Pass which winds its way through the mountains to Swellendam. The town forms part of the Langeberg Local Municipality.

== Geography ==
Barrydale lies in a transitional zone between two climatic regions. Although close to the Overberg, its climate is generally drier and more similar to the Little Karoo. Annual rainfall is relatively low, and agriculture depends on water from the Tradouw River and nearby mountain streams.

== History ==
The land on which Barrydale stands was originally part of the farm Tradouws Hoek, granted in 1832. The town was formally established in 1878 when the Van Coller brothers subdivided part of the farm for settlement. It was officially recognized as a village in 1881.

The origin of the name “Barrydale” is uncertain. It likely refers to the John Joseph Barry of the Barry family, a prominent trading and landowning family in the Overberg during the 19th century.

In 1959, under the Group Areas Act, a Coloured township was established to the south of the town.

== Churches ==
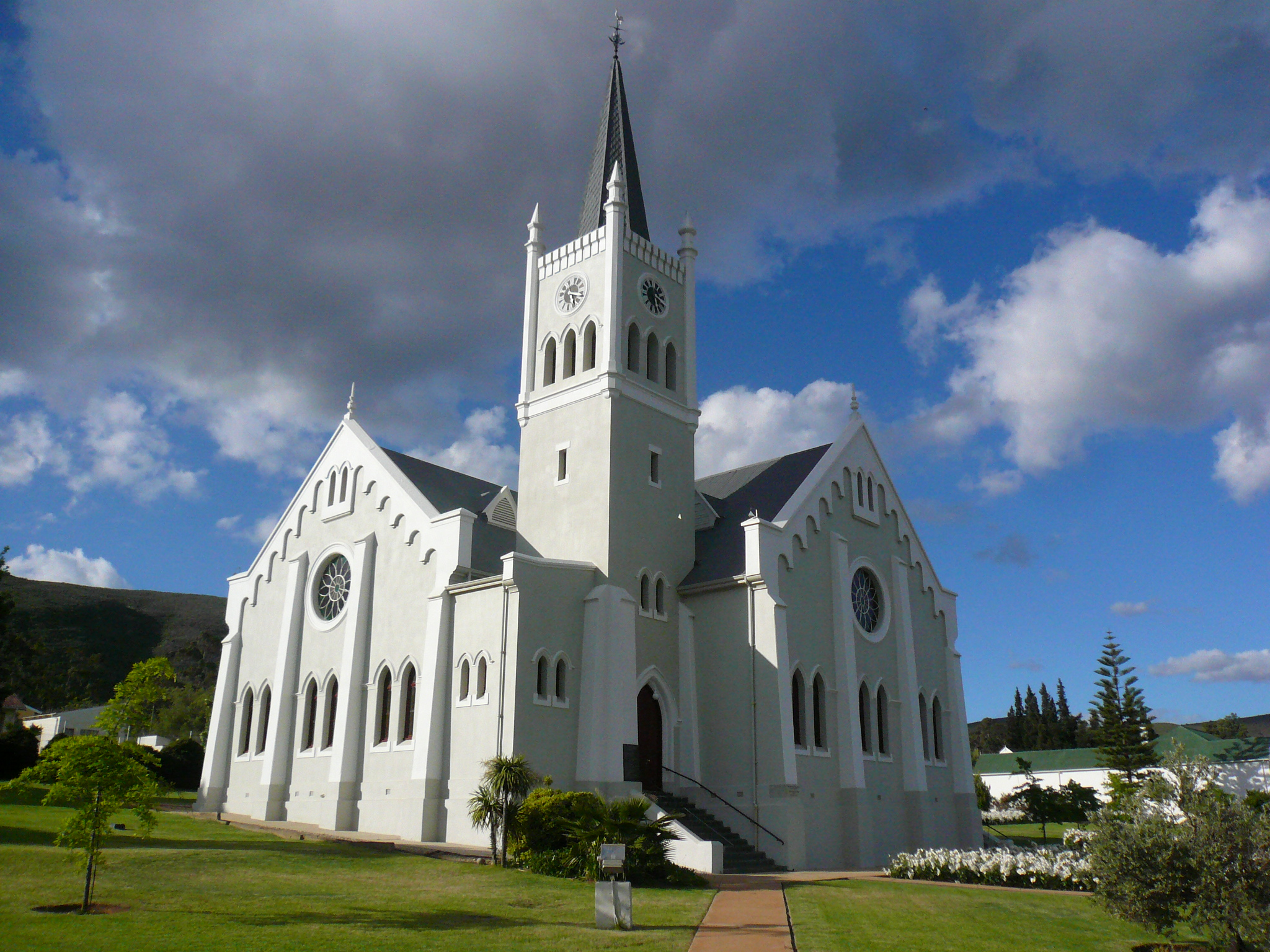
Dutch Reformed Church, Barrydale

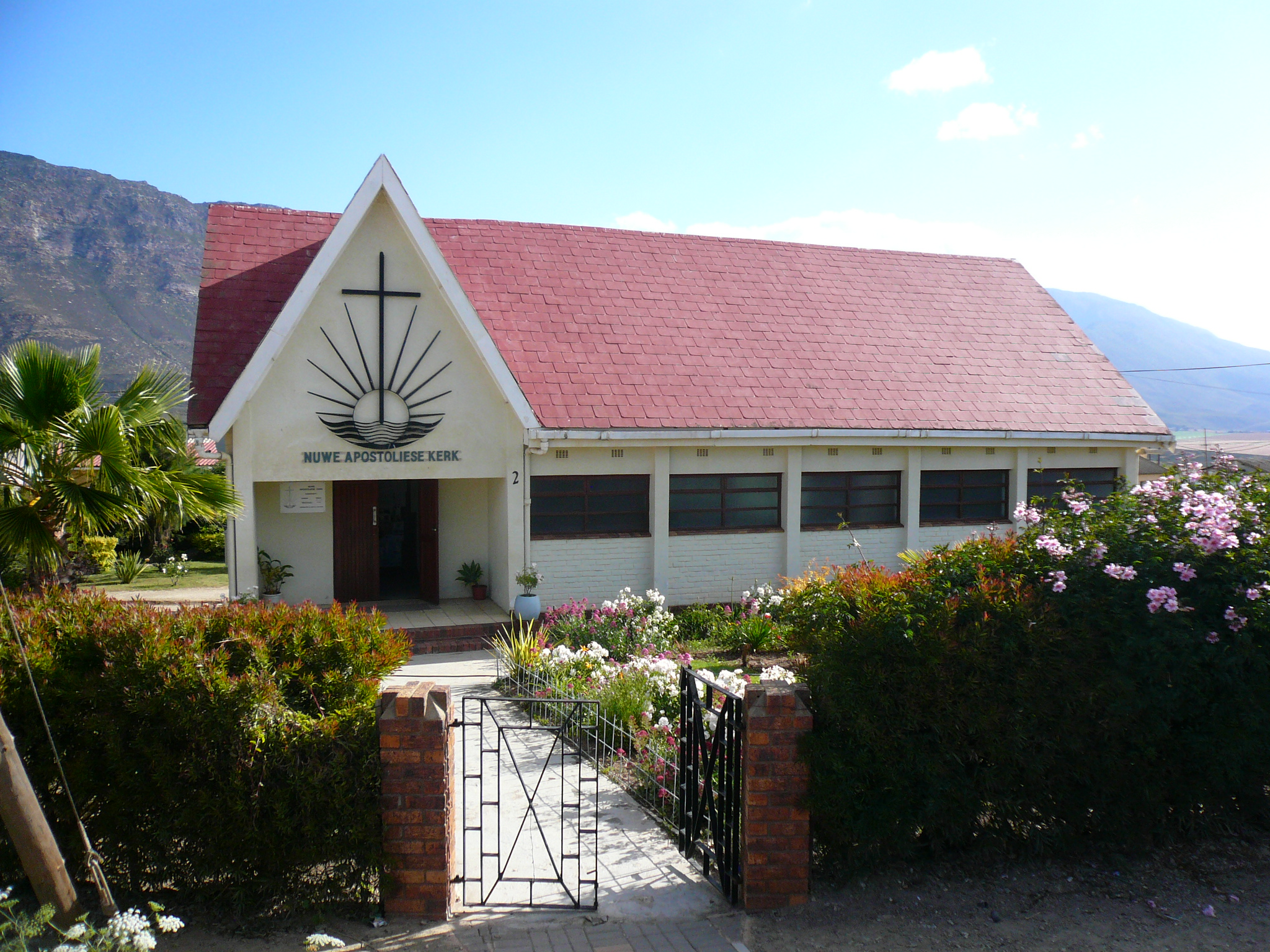
New Apostolic Church

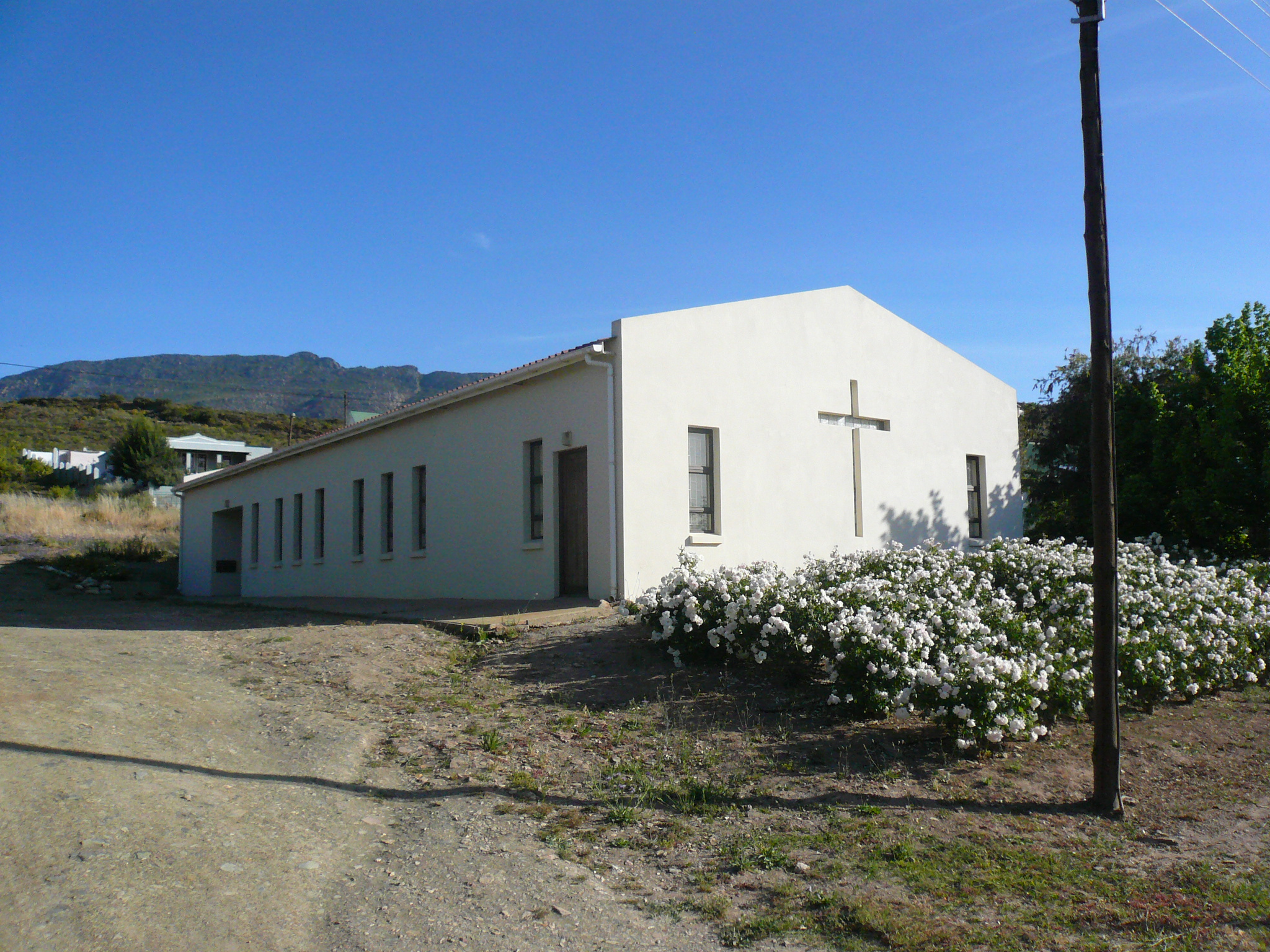
Evangelical Reformed Church of SA

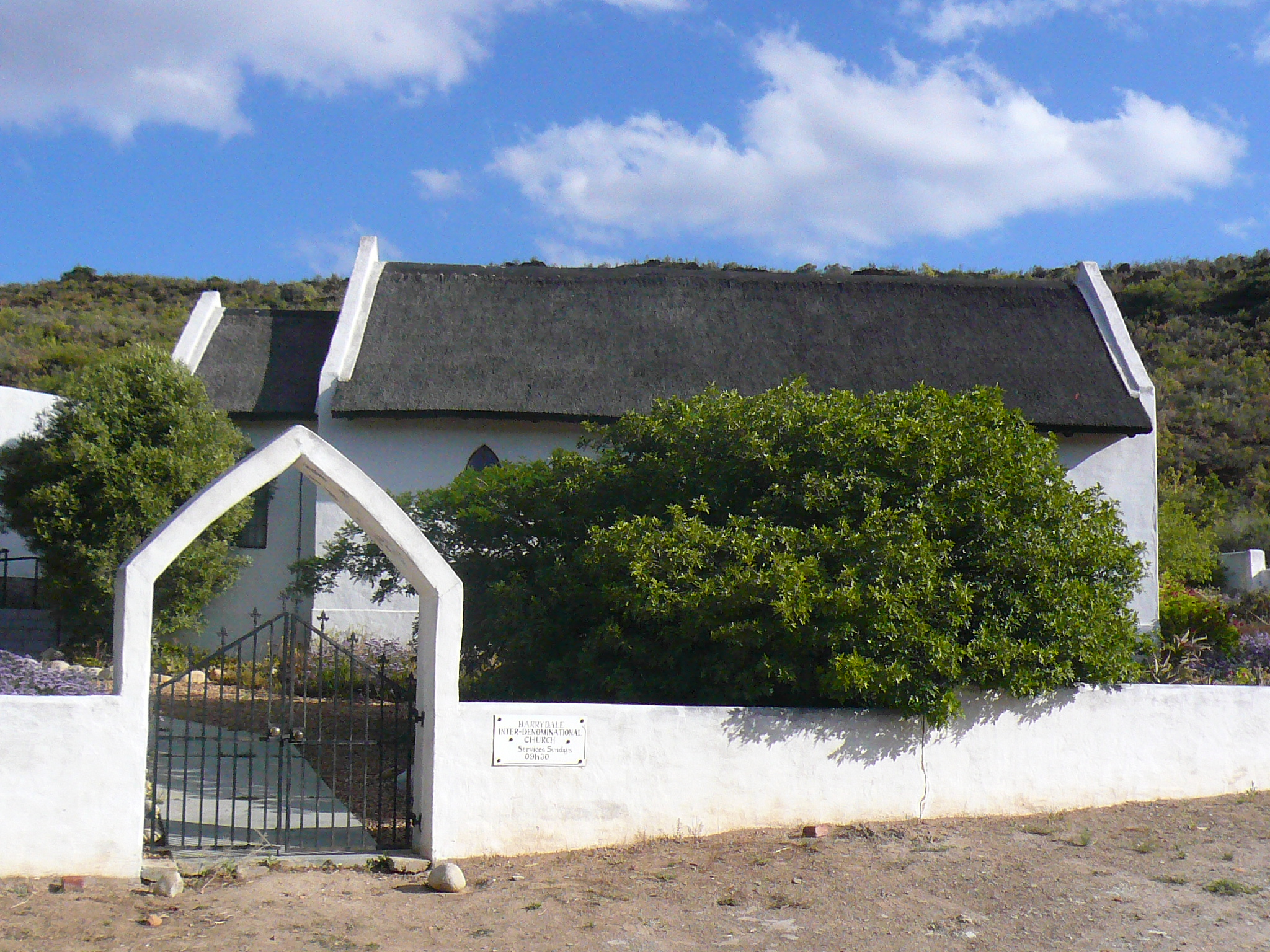
Interdenominational Church

== Notable people ==
- Giniel de Villiers (born 1972), rally driver and 2009 Dakar Rally winner.

== See also ==
- Tradouw Pass
- Langeberg
- Route 62 (South Africa)
