= Suurbraak =

Suurbraak "Xairu" (A place called Paradise)
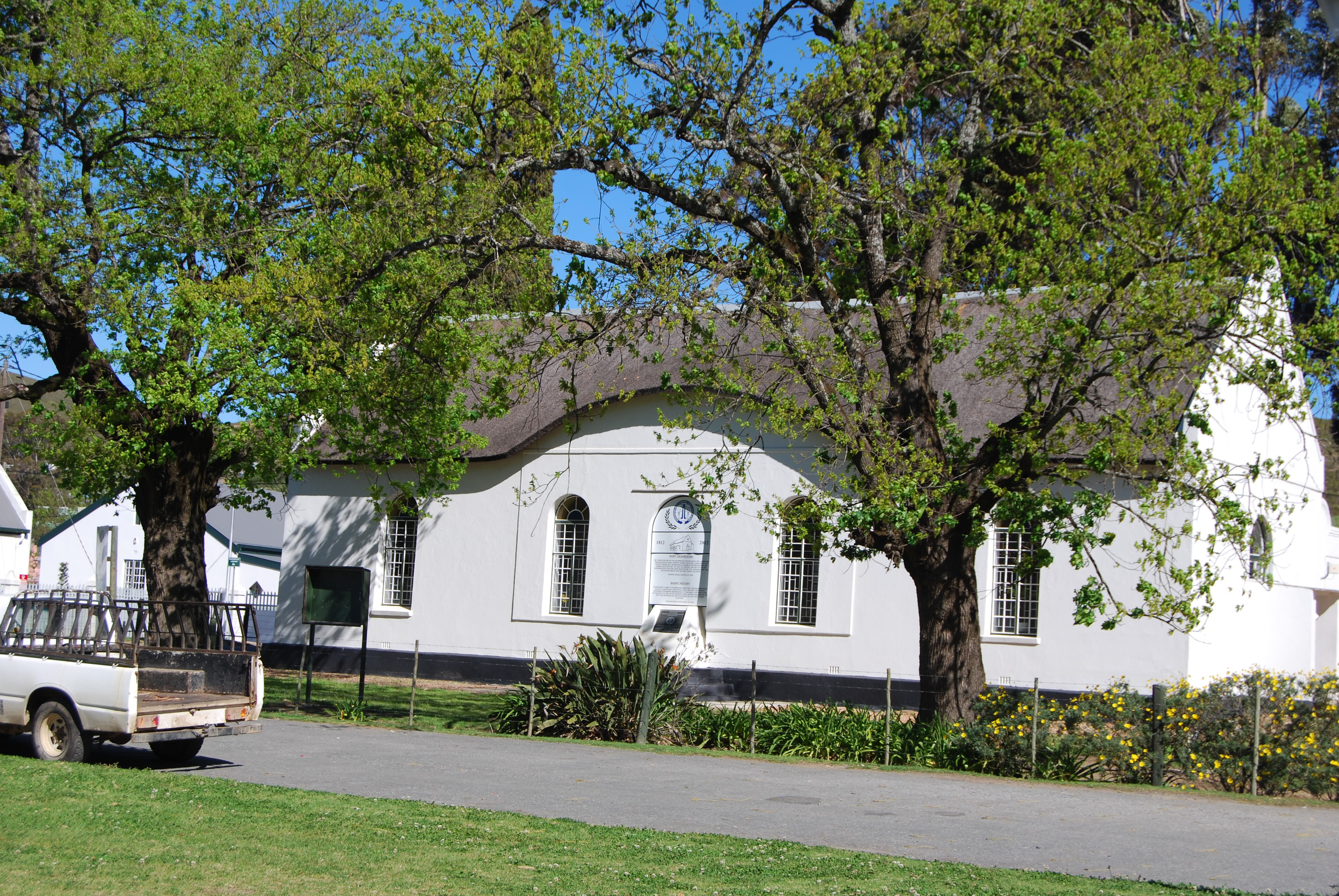
- Suurbraak Mission

- Location within Western Cape Location within South Africa
- Coordinates: 34°01′S 20°39′E
- Country: South Africa
- Province: Western Cape
- District: Overberg
- Municipality: Swellendam
- Established: 1812

Government
  - Councillor: Heinrich Hartnick

Area
  - Total: 46.11 km^{2} (17.80 sq mi)

Population (2011)
  - Total: 2,252
  - Density: 48.84/km^{2} (126.5/sq mi)

Racial makeup (2011)
  - Black African: 3.2%
  - Coloured: 93.2%
  - Indian/Asian: 0.6%
  - White: 2.6%
  - Other: 0.4%

First languages (2011)
  - Afrikaans: 95.9%
  - English: 3.3%
  - Other: 0.8%
- Time zone: UTC+2 (SAST)
- Postal code (street): 6743
- PO box: 6743
- Area code: 028

Suurbraak is a settlement in Overberg District Municipality in the Western Cape province of South Africa.

The village was established in 1812, when the London Missionary Society established a mission station to serve the Attaqua Khoikhoi.
