= Langeberg =

Mountain range in South Africa

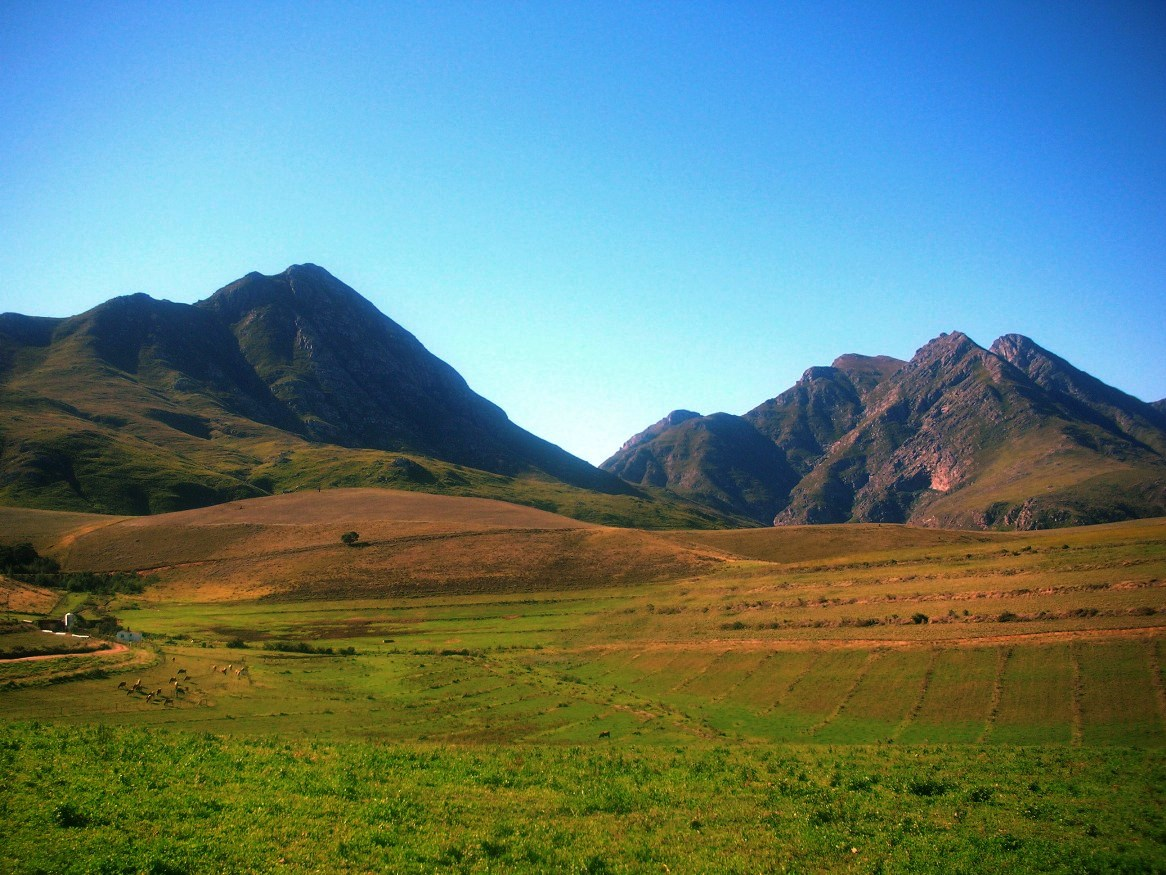
- Landscape of the Langeberg Range near Robertson

Highest point
- Peak: Keeromsberg
- Elevation: 2,072 m (6,798 ft)
- Prominence: 1,118 m (3,668 ft)
- Listing: List of mountain ranges of South Africa; Ribu
- Coordinates: 33°33′43″S 19°36′09″E

Dimensions
- Length: 250 km (160 mi) NW/SE
- Width: 20 km (12 mi) NE/SW

Geography
- Location within South Africa
- Country: South Africa
- Province: Western Cape
- Parent range: Western Cape System

Geology
- Orogeny: Cape Fold Belt
- Rock age: Paleoproterozoic
- Rock type: Sandstone

Climbing
- Easiest route: From Montagu

The Langeberg Range is a mountain range in the Western Cape province of South Africa. Its highest peak is Keeromsberg at 2,072 m that lies 15 km northeast of the town of Worcester. Some of the highest peaks of the range are located just to the north of Swellendam, in a subrange known as the Clock Peaks whose highest point is the 1,710 m high Misty Point. Local lore states one can tell the time by means of the shadows cast by the seven summits of the Clock Peaks.

== Etymology ==
The name is Dutch and means "long mountain"

== Physiography and geology ==
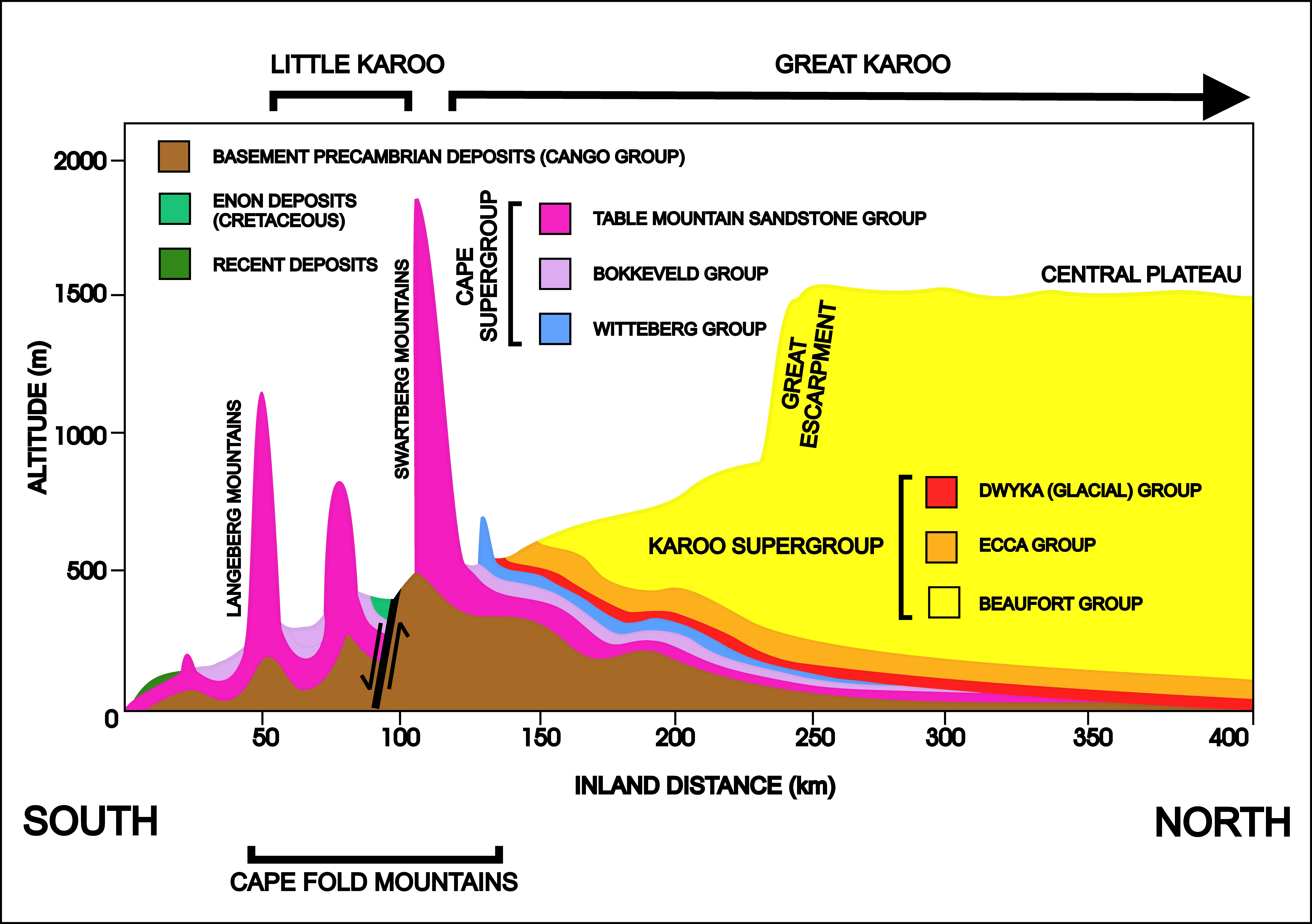
A diagrammatic 400 km north-south cross-section through the southern portion of the Western Cape, South Africa, near Calitzdorp in the Little Karoo (approximately 21° 30’ E), showing the relationship between the coastal strip (the Overberg) and Little Karoo, separated by the Langeberg mountain range. The significance of the various geological layers (coloured layers) can be found in the articles on the Karoo Supergroup and Cape Fold Belt. The heavy black line flanked by opposing arrows is the fault that runs for nearly 300 km along the southern edge of the Swartberg Mountains. The Swartberg Mountain range owes some of its great height to upliftment along this fault line. The subsurface structures are not to scale.

The range runs roughly NW/SE in its western part and in an east-west direction in its mid and eastern section and is approximately 250 km long, from Worcester, past Robertson, Montagu, Swellendam, Heidelberg and Riversdale to the proximity of George.

The Langeberg's most westerly point is located 5 km east of the town of Worcester; the range ends some 20 km North of Mossel Bay in the east. The open plains of the Little Karoo border the north of the mountain range, while to the south lies the Agulhas Plain and the Overberg wheatbelt.

The Langeberg Range is composed mostly of Table Mountain Sandstone and the range is part of the Cape Fold Belt.

== Ecology ==
Grootvadersbosch Nature Reserve in the Barrydale area of the Langeberg Range

On the southern slopes of the range mountain fynbos can be found, with Afromontane forest patches found in deep secluded gorges, while on the drier northern slopes karroid scrub is found.

=== Protected areas ===
There are the following protected areas along the range:

- The Marloth Nature Reserve, in the area where the highest peaks are found
- The Boosmansbos Wilderness Area, which includes the Grootvadersbosch Nature Reserve near Barrydale
- The Garcia State Forest

== Mountain passes ==
The range is traversed by four mountain passes, from west to east, they are:

- Cogmanskloof Pass, linking Montagu with Ashton.
- Tradouws Pass, linking Barrydale with Swellendam and Heidelberg
- Garcia's Pass, linking Riversdale and Ladismith, Western Cape
- Cloetes Pass, linking Mossel Bay with Ladismith, Western Cape

== See also ==
- Geography of South Africa
- List of mountain ranges of South Africa
- Western Cape
