= List of mountain passes of the Western Cape =

This is a list of publicly accessible, motorable passes in the Western Cape province, South Africa.

Name	Location	Crosses	Highest Point m	Road	Between towns	Road surface
Akkedisberg Pass	34.4096°S 19.5976°E		160	R320	Riviersonderend and Stanford	tar
Attakwaskloof Pass (old)	33.8425°S 21.9832°E		820		Mosselbay and Oudtshoorn	gravel
Bainskloof Pass	33.6024°S 19.1117°E		595	R303	Wellington and Ceres	tar
Biedouwvallei	32.1280°S 19.3348°E				Clanwilliam and Uitspankraal	gravel
Blinkberg Pass	32.7027°S 19.4189°E				Prince Alfred's Hamlet and Wuppertal	gravel
Bloukrans Pass (Tsitsikamma)	33.9542°S 23.6447°E			R102	Plettenberg Bay and Jeffreys Bay	tar
Bosluiskloof Pass	33.3422°S 21.4852°E				Laingsburg and Calitzdorp	gravel
Bothmanskloof Pass	33.4060°S 18.8767°E			R46	Malmesbury and Riebeek Kasteel	tar
Burgers Pass (Koo Pass)	33.6891°S 19.9207°E			R318	Montagu and Touws River	tar
Chapman's Peak Drive	34.0761°S 18.3641°E			M6	Hout Bay and Sun Valley	tar
Cloete's Pass	33.9587°S 21.7980°E			R327	Van Wyksdorp and Herbertsdale	gravel
Dasklip Pass	32.9037°S 19.0384°E				near Porterville	tar
De Jagers Pass	32.0766°S 22.7474°E				near Beaufort West	gravel
Die Venster	33.2714°S 19.7211°E					
Du Plessis Pass	34.0774°S 21.7718°E			R327	Mossel Bay and Herbertsdale	tar
Du Toitskloof Pass	33.7247°S 19.1466°E			R101	Paarl and Worcester	tar
Dwarskloof Pass	34.1002°S 19.6147°E					
Eselbank Pass	32.30034°S 19.21946°E					gravel
Floorshoogte Pass	34.1538°S 19.3010°E					
Franschhoek Pass	33.9163°S 19.1584°E					tar
Gamkaskloof	33.3415°S 21.8768°E					
Garcia's Pass	33.9683°S 21.2196°E		548			tar
Gifberg Pass	31.7441°S 18.7792°E					
Grootrivier Pass	33.9657°S 23.5616°E					
Gydo Pass	33.2339°S 19.3308°E					tar
Gysmanshoek Pass	33.9374°S 21.0542°E					
Helshoogte Pass	33.9192°S 18.9202°E					tar
Hex River Pass	33.4017°S 19.7597°E			N1	Touwsrivier and Worcester	tar
Hex River Poort	33.5512°S 19.5215°E					
Hoek se berg Pass	32.1209°S 19.1792°E					
Homtini Pass	33.9497°S 22.9187°E					
Hoogekraal Pass	33.9324°S 22.7811°E					
Houwhoek Pass	34.2137°S 19.1672°E					tar
Houwhoek Pass (old)	34.2130°S 19.1810°E					gravel
Huisrivier Pass	33.5026°S 21.5961°E					
Kaaimans River Pass	33.9711°S 22.5462°E					
Karatera Pass	33.9248°S 22.8499°E					gravel
Kareedouwberg Pass	33.2777°S 22.2782°E					
Karelskraal Pass	32.5001°S 21.1910°E					
Katbakkies Pass	32.8976°S 19.5545°E					tar
Kogmans Kloof Pass (Cogmans, Kockemans)	33.8132°S 20.0900°E					
Kouberg Pass	32.25346°S 19.18700°E					
Langkloof Pass	33.7323°S 20.2569°E					
Meiringspoort	33.4163°S 22.5497°E			N12	De Rust and Klaarstroom	tar
Middelberg Pass	32.6280°S 19.1421°E					gravel
Michell's Pass	33.3788°S 19.2965°E	Skurweberg Mountains	490	R46	Wolseley and Ceres	tar
Molteno Pass	32.2262°S 22.5622°E			R381	Beaufort West and Loxton, Northern Cape	tar & gravel
Montagu Pass	33.8826°S 22.4351°E				Herold and George	gravel
Nieuwoudt Pass	32.3472°S 19.0133°E					
Nuwekloof Pass	33.3125°S 19.0739°E			R46	Gouda and Tulbagh	tar
Ouberg Pass	33.6952°S 20.2442°E					
Oudekloof Pass (Roodezandt Pass)	33.2662°S 19.0633°E					
Outeniqua Pass	33.8864°S 22.3991°E	Outeniqua Mountains	800 metres (2,600 ft)	N9/N12	George and Oudtshoorn	tar
Pakhuis Pass	32.1457°S 19.0341°E					tar
Phantom Pass	34.0017°S 22.9950°E					gravel
Piekenierskloof Pass	32.6429°S 18.9475°E					tar
Potjiesberg Pass	33.7125°S 23.0475°E		910 metres (2,990 ft)	R62		
Prince Alfred Pass	33.7698°S 23.1434°E					
Rammelkop Pass (Allemans Pass)	32.5306°S 21.1819°E					
Red Hill Road (Simon's Town)	34.1805°S 18.4169°E			M66	Cape Peninsula to Simon's Town	tar
Robinson Pass	33.8810°S 22.0262°E					
Roodezandt Pass	33.2662°S 19.0633°E					
Rooiberg Pass	33.6501°S 21.6430°E					gravel
Rooihoogte Pass	33.6094°S 19.8407°E		1,234 metres (4,049 ft)	R318		
Rooinek Pass	33.3247°S 20.9226°E					
Rooiwalspoort	30.7950°S 18.4509°E					
Roseberg Pass	32.2613°S 22.5680°E					
Schoemanspoort Pass	33.4229°S 22.2459°E					
Seweweeks Poort	33.4136°S 21.4069°E					gravel
Shaws Mountain Pass	34.3112°S 19.4154°E					tar
Silver Rivier Pass	33.9653°S 22.5618°E					
Sir Lowry's Pass	34.1497°S 18.9283°E			N2	Somerset West and Grabouw	tar
Skitterykloof Pass	32.8783°S 19.7228°E					gravel
Steenbras Mountain Road (Faure Marine Drive)	34°10′49″S 18°49′49″E			R44	Gordon's Bay and Rooiels Bay	tar
Stokoe's Pass	34.0754°S 18.9964°E					
Swaarmoed Pass	33.3427°S 19.5070°E					
Swartberg Pass	33.3166°S 22.0435°E					gravel
Theronsberg Pass	33.2805°S 19.4941°E					
Touws Rivier Pass	33.9466°S 22.6129°E					
Tradouws Pass	33.9717°S 20.7016°E					tar
Uitkyk Pass	32.4037°S 19.0923°E					paved
Uniondale Poort	33.6812°S 23.1487°E					
Van Der Stel Pass	34.1547°S 19.2317°E					gravel
Versveld Pass	32.8533°S 18.7423°E					tar
Viljoen's Pass	34.0946°S 19.0504°E			R321	Grabouw and Villiersdorp	tar

== See also ==
Mountain Passes of South Africa
