= Du Plessis Pass =

Mountain pass in Western Cape, South Africa

Coordinates: 34°04′38.8″S 21°46′18.4″E

Du Plassis Pass is situated in the Western Cape province of South Africa, on the Regional road R327 (Western Cape) between Mossel Bay and Herbertsdale. The road through the pass was first constructed in 1850.

== See also ==
- Otto Du Plessis Pass, Eastern Cape
