= Erica nematophylla =

Scientific classification
- Kingdom: Plantae
- Clade: Tracheophytes
- Clade: Angiosperms
- Clade: Eudicots
- Clade: Asterids
- Order: Ericales
- Family: Ericaceae
- Genus: Erica
- Species: E. nematophylla

Binomial name
- Erica nematophylla Guthrie & Bolus

Synonyms
- Erica filamentosa var. longiflora Bolus

Species of flowering plant

Erica nematophylla is a plant belonging to the genus Erica and is part of the fynbos. The species is endemic to the Western Cape. It occurs in two locations: Stormsvlei near Riviersonderend and Garcia Pass near Riversdale. Both populations are threatened by invasive plants.
