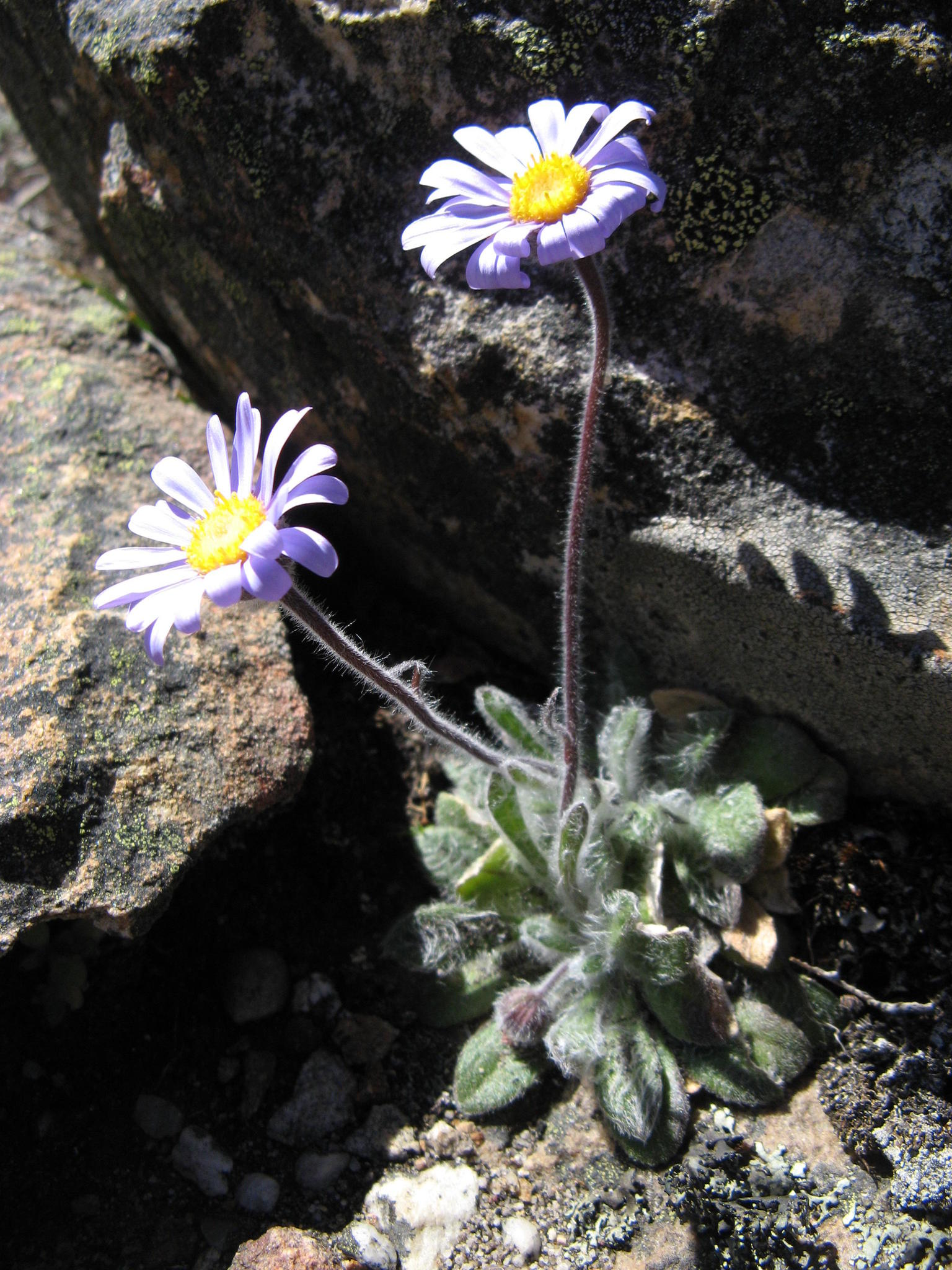
- Felicia bellidioides subsp. bellidioides

Scientific classification
- Kingdom: Plantae
- Clade: Tracheophytes
- Clade: Angiosperms
- Clade: Eudicots
- Clade: Asterids
- Order: Asterales
- Family: Asteraceae
- Genus: Felicia
- Section: Felicia sect. Neodetris
- Species: F. bellidioides

Binomial name
- Felicia bellidioides Schltr.

Subspecies
- subsp. bellidioides; subsp. foliosa Grau

= Felicia bellidioides =

Perennial plant in the daisy family from South Africa

Felicia bellidioides is a perennial plant of up to about 25 cm (10 in) high, that is assigned to the family Asteraceae. Most of the narrowly inverted egg-shaped leaves are silky hairy and in a basal rosette with no or few very narrow bracts on the stalk in the subspecies bellidioides. In the subspecies foliosa, the narrower leaves are not silky hairy but variously bristly and glandular, with more and larger bracts on the inflorescence stalk. The flowerheads sit individually on top of a long peduncle and consist of an involucre with only two whorls of bracts, about twenty purplish blue ray florets, surrounding many yellow disc florets. It occurs in the Western Cape province of South Africa.

== Description ==
Felicia bellidioides subsp. bellidioides is a perennial, upwardly growing plant of up to 25 cm (10 in) high, sometimes with runners. Its leaves are set alternate along the stems (with the exception of the lowest pair that is opposite), mostly crowded in a basal rosette. The leaves are inverted egg-shaped to narrowly inverted egg-shaped, sometimes with an indistinct stalk, either broader and shorter, 1–3 cm (2/5–1 1/5 in) long and 2–8 mm (0.079–0.315 in) wide, and then usually white silky hairy, or 2½–3 cm (1.0–1.2 in) long and 3–6 mm (0.12–0.24 in) wide and distinctly hairy, or longer, 2–4 cm (4/5–1 3/5 in) long and 1½–5 mm (0.06–0.2 in) wide and usually short bristly and glandular hairs. In all forms the leaf margins rarely carry a few teeth.

=== Flowers and seeds ===
The flower heads are individually set on top of an up to 13 cm (5 in) long stalk, that mostly carries no bracts but rarely very narrow bracts. The involucre is up to 7 mm (0.28 in) in diameter and consists of a double row of 5 mm (1/5 in) long bracts. The outer bracts are lance-shaped, about 1½ mm (0.06 in) wide, and carry long hairs or glandular bristles. The inner bracts are narrowly inverted egg-shaped and about 2 mm (0.08 in) wide, with a few hairs and a papery margin. Each flower head carries about twenty ray florets, with a purplish blue ligula of about 10 mm (2/5 in) long and 3 mm (0.12 in) wide. These encircle numerous disc florets, with a yellow corolla of up to 3 mm long. Encircling the base of the corolla are many white, toothed, deciduous, pappus bristles of 2–3 mm (0.08–0.12 in) long. The eventually black, dry, one-seeded, indehiscent fruits called cypselae are inverted egg-shaped, about 2½ mm (0.1 in) long and 1.1 mm (0.043 in) wide, set with fine scales and with up to 0.1 mm (0.0039 in) long hair, and are edged with a mostly brighter coloured ridge around the outline.

=== Subspecies ===
Felicia bellidioides subsp. foliata differs from the typical subspecies by having bracts higher up the peduncles, clearly stalked, longer and narrower leaves of 1–6 cm long and 3/4–4 1/2 mm wide, without the silky hairs.

== Taxonomy ==
Rudolf Schlechter was the first to describe this species in 1897, based on a specimen collected on the Matroosberg at an altitude of about 2,000 m (6,600 ft) in 1895 by Rudolf Marloth. Jürke Grau in his 1973 Revision of the genus Felicia (Asteraceae) distinguished a form with bracts higher up the peduncle, stalked, longer and narrower leaves without the silky hair characteristic of the typical form. He named it Felicia bellidioides subsp. foliata, the type of which has been collected by Barker on the Voetpadsberg between Worcester and Laingsburg in 1951. The species is considered to be part of the section Neodetris. The species name bellidioides has been compounded from the Latin bellis referring to the genus Bellis, and the Greek suffix -oides, which means "in the form of".

== Distribution, habitat and ecology ==
Felicia bellidioides subsp. bellidioides is known from the Hottentots Holland Mountains in the southwest to Matroosberg in the northeast. Isolated subpopulations of this subspecies also occurs in the Riviersonderend Mountains near Genadendal, the Groot Winterhoek Mountains near Gouda, the Anysberg, and the Klein Swartberg near Ladysmith. Subsp. foliosa borders the distribution a to the north and east, from the Cederberg, the Kouebokkeveld Mountains, Keeromsberg, the Witteberg near Laingsburg, Eendracht near Montagu, and the Swartberg Pass. The species is restricted to altitudes of 1,000–2,000 m (3,300–6,600 ft), where it often grows in cracks in the rocks.

== Conservation ==
Both subspecies of Felicia bellidioides have a stable population and their continued survival is considered to be of least concern.
