= R320 road =

R320 road may refer to:

- R320 road (Ireland)
- R320 road (South Africa)
