= R328 road =

R328 road may refer to:

- R328 road (Ireland)
- R328 road (South Africa)
