= Hex River =

Hex River may refer to:

- Hex River (Breede River), a tributary of the Breede River in South Africa
- Hex River (Elands River), a tributary of the Elands River in South Africa

== See also ==
- Hex River Mountains
- Hex River Pass
- Hex River Poort Pass
- Hex River Tunnels
