= R319 road =

R319 road may refer to:

- R319 road (Ireland)
- R319 road (South Africa)
