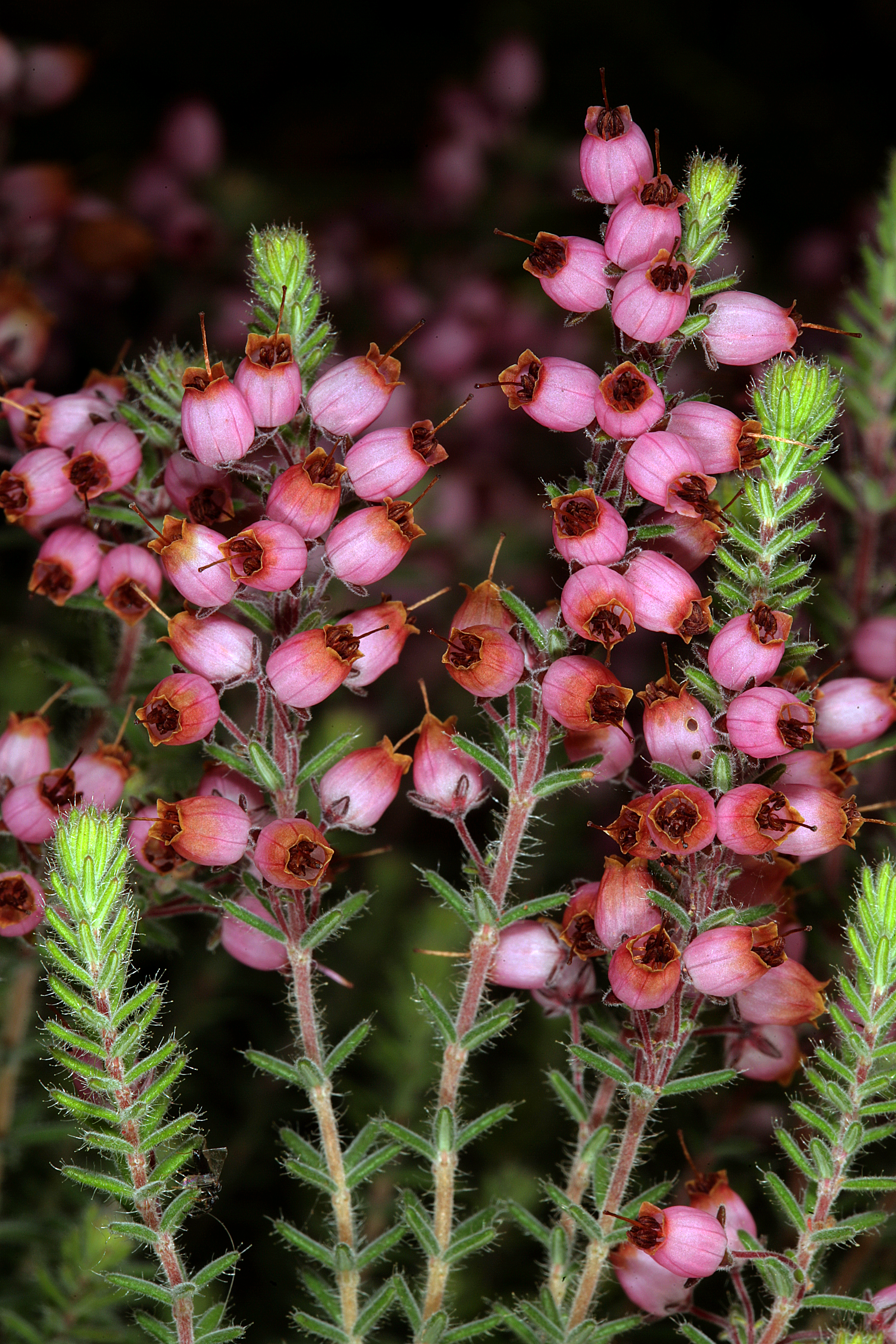

Scientific classification
- Kingdom: Plantae
- Clade: Tracheophytes
- Clade: Angiosperms
- Clade: Eudicots
- Clade: Asterids
- Order: Ericales
- Family: Ericaceae
- Genus: Erica
- Species: E. grata

Binomial name
- Erica grata Guthrie & Bolus, (1905)

= Erica grata =

Species of flowering plant

Erica grata is a plant belonging to the genus Erica and forming part of the fynbos. The species is endemic to the Western Cape and occurs in the Langeberg from Swellendam to Garcia Pass.
