= R326 road =

R326 road may refer to:

- R326 road (Ireland)
- R326 road (South Africa)
