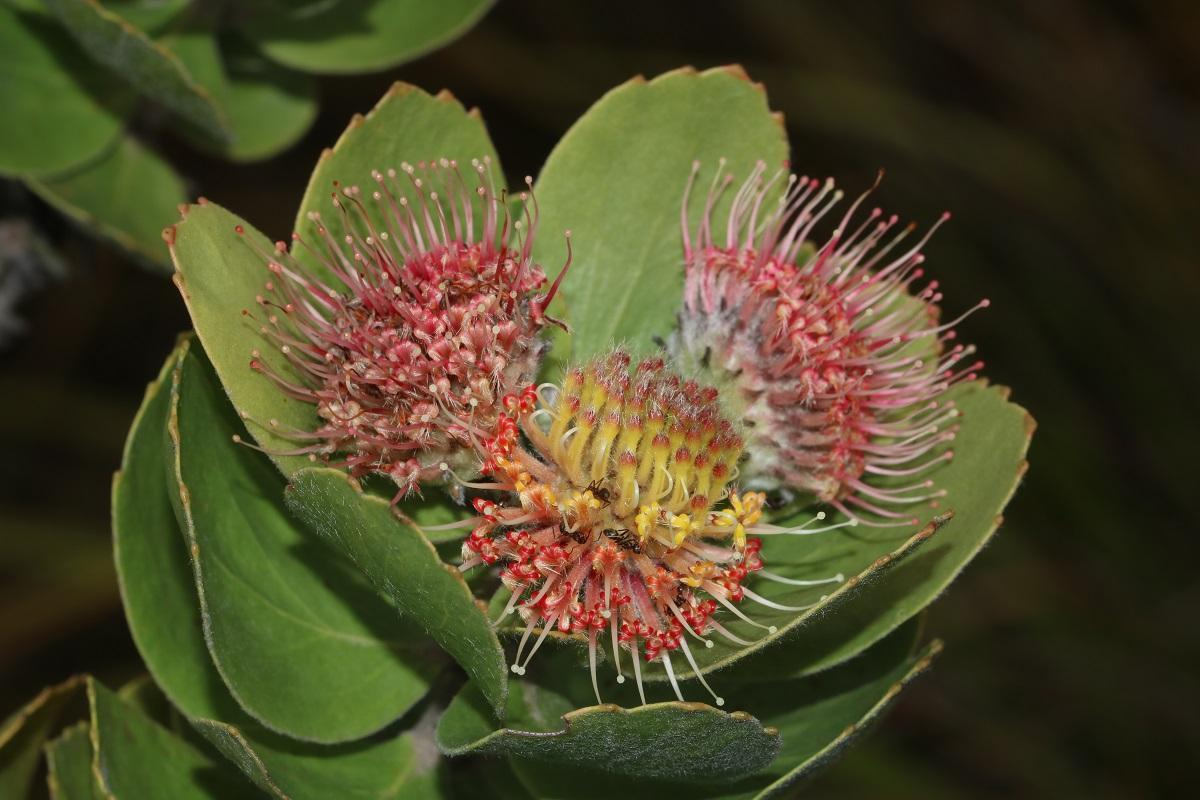

Conservation status
- Near Threatened (IUCN 3.1)

Scientific classification
- Kingdom: Plantae
- Clade: Embryophytes
- Clade: Tracheophytes
- Clade: Angiosperms
- Clade: Eudicots
- Order: Proteales
- Family: Proteaceae
- Genus: Leucospermum
- Species: L. winteri

Binomial name
- Leucospermum winteri Rourke

= Leucospermum winteri =

Species of plant native to South Africa

Leucospermum winteri is an evergreen, rounded shrub up to 1.3 m (4.3 ft) tall in the family Proteaceae. Its slightly smelling flower heads can be found between July and December, and are pollinated by insects such as flies and bees. About two months after flowering the fruits are ripe and fall to the ground. Here, these are gathered by native ants that carry them to their underground nests, where the seeds remain safe until overhead fire and removal of the biomass trigger gemination. The plants of this species do not survive the fire that occurs naturally in its fynbos habitat. This species is an endemic of the Langkloof between the Gourits River Valley and Garcia's Pass in the Langeberg, where it occurs on the ridges at 1,100–1,300 m (3,600–4,300 ft) elevation. Although only a few hundred plants are known, the population is stable, so the species is only regarded near threatened. It is called Riversdale pincushion in English.

== Description ==
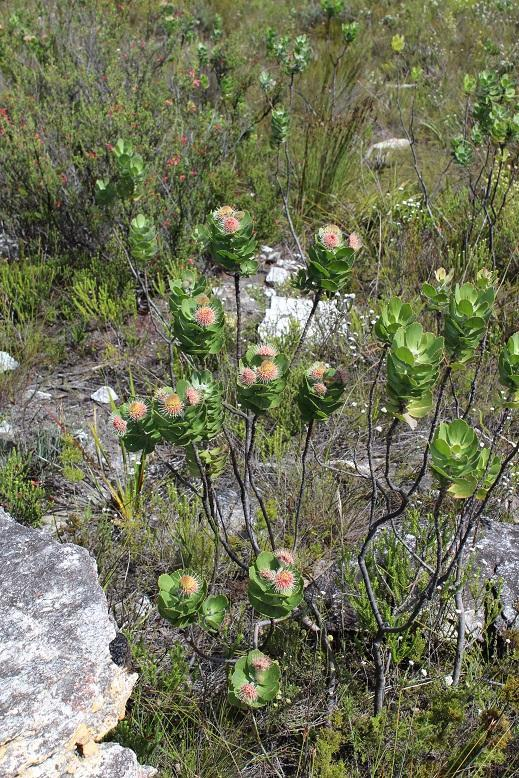
Leucospermum winteri, habit

Leucospermum winteri is a small, evergreen, rounded shrub of about 1.3 m (4.3 ft) high and up to 2 m (6.6 ft) in diameter, that develops from a single stem. The flowering branches are covered in downy hairs and are 0.5–0.8 cm (0.2–0.3 in) thick. The leaves are set alternately along the branches somewhat overlapping at an upward angle, and lack both stipules and stalk. They are broadly inverted egg-shaped to broadly wedge-shaped, 4–7 cm (1.6–2.8 in) long and 2–4.5 cm (0.79–1.77 in) wide, and are initially covered in soft crisped hairs with some straight hairs in between, that vanish later on. Towards the tip, there are five to fourteen blunt, reddish, thickened teeth.

The globe-shaped flower heads are about 3 cm (1.2 in) in diameter, sit on a stalk of 1.5–3 cm (0.59–1.18 in) long, with three to six together near the end of the branches. Each flower head is subtended by an involucre consisting of ovate bracts with a pointy tip of .75–1 cm (0.30–0.39 in) that are cartilaginous, thickly covered with densely matted woolly hairs and with a tuft of very short straight hairs at the tip, tightly overlapping, pressed against the underside of the flower head. The common base of the flowers in the same head is somewhat variable in shape, skewed cone-shaped to egg-shaped, 5–8 mm (0.20–0.31 in) long, and about 5 mm (0.20 in) wide.

The bracts subtending the individual flower are egg-shaped, about 7 mm (0.28 in) long and 2.5–3 mm (0.098–0.118 in) wide, the tips thickened and ending abruptly in a short sharp point, and thickly covered with densely matted woolly hairs. The 4-merous perianth is 1.25–1.5 cm (0.5–0.6 in) long, straight, and cylinder-shaped while still in the bud, the outside initially yellow but later becoming pink, while on the inside a deep crimson color develops. The lower part where the lobes remain merged when the flower has opened (called tube) is up to 8 mm (0.31 in) long, hairless near the base and with very fine powdery hairs where it changes in the middle part (or claws) where the perianth is split lengthwise. These claws are all equally coiled back when the flower has opened, with the outer surface sparsely shaggy-haired. The upper part (or limbs), which enclosed the pollen presenter in the bud consists of four lance-shaped lobes of about 2 mm (0.079 in) long, which carry a few stiff hairs. From the perianth emerges a straight or slightly incurved style of about 2 cm (0.8 in) long, tapering in the upper part. The thickened part at the tip of the style called pollen presenter is about 1 mm (0.04 in) long, egg- to hoof-shaped with a groove across its very tip. It is difficult to distinguish where the ovary changes in the style. It is powdery hairy and is subtended by four pointy, line- to thread-shaped scales of 3–4 mm (0.12–0.16 in) long.

== Taxonomy ==
As far as known, Dr. John Muir, a medical doctor and amateur plantsman that lived in Riversdale was the first to collect a specimen of the Riversdale pincushion in 1909. The collected specimen however only had very young buds, and a mistake must have been made in noting its location, namely Stilbaai. In 1938, a specimen was obtained from a hotel in Riversdale by Mr. L. Guthrie. Early 1974, Mr. J.H. Winter, at the time curator at Kirstenbosch National Botanical Garden stumbled on a population on the flanks of a remote peak on Langkloof Farm in the Langeberg Mountains near Riversdale. John Patrick Rourke made a second collection of this population in late 1974. In 1979, he described the species and named it Leucospermum winteri. L. winteri has been assigned to the section Diastelloidea. The species has been named winteri in honor of J. Winter.

== Conservation ==
The Riversdale pincushion is considered near threatened, because the approximately ten subpopulations that occur within an area 68 km^{2} (26 sq mi) are stable, but potentially at risk due to afforestation and invasive species.
