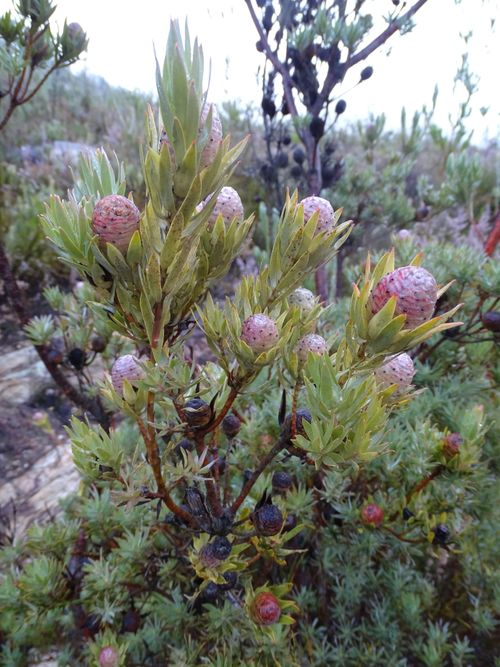
- Leucadendron uliginosum subsp. uliginosum Observed in South Africa by Shaun Swanepoel

Conservation status
- Least Concern (IUCN 3.1)

Scientific classification
- Kingdom: Plantae
- Clade: Tracheophytes
- Clade: Angiosperms
- Clade: Eudicots
- Order: Proteales
- Family: Proteaceae
- Genus: Leucadendron
- Species: L. uliginosum R.Br.
- Subspecies: L. u. subsp. uliginosum

Trinomial name
- Leucadendron uliginosum subsp. uliginosum

= Leucadendron uliginosum subsp. uliginosum =

Subspecies of plant

Leucadendron uliginosum subsp. uliginosum, the Outeniqua conebush, is a flowering shrub and subspecies of Leucadendron uliginosum, belonging to the genus Leucadendron and forming part of the fynbos biome. The species is endemic to the Western Cape, where it occurs in the Outeniqua and Tsitsikamma Mountains from Cloete's Pass to Plettenberg Bay.

The shrub grows to a height of 2.3 m and flowers in November. The plant dies after a fire but the seeds survive. The seeds are stored in a spiny on the female plant and only fall to the ground after a fire and are possibly dispersed by the wind. The plant is unisexual and there are separate plants with male and female flowers, which are pollinated by small insects. The plant grows mainly in rocky sandstone soils at altitudes of 500 - 1 000 m.

The tree's FSA number is 82.6.
