= R327 road =

R327 road may refer to:

- R327 road (Ireland), a road connecting the N60 east of Claremorris, County Mayo, and the R360 in County Galway
- R327 road (South Africa), a road connecting Mossel Bay and Albertina with Ladismith
