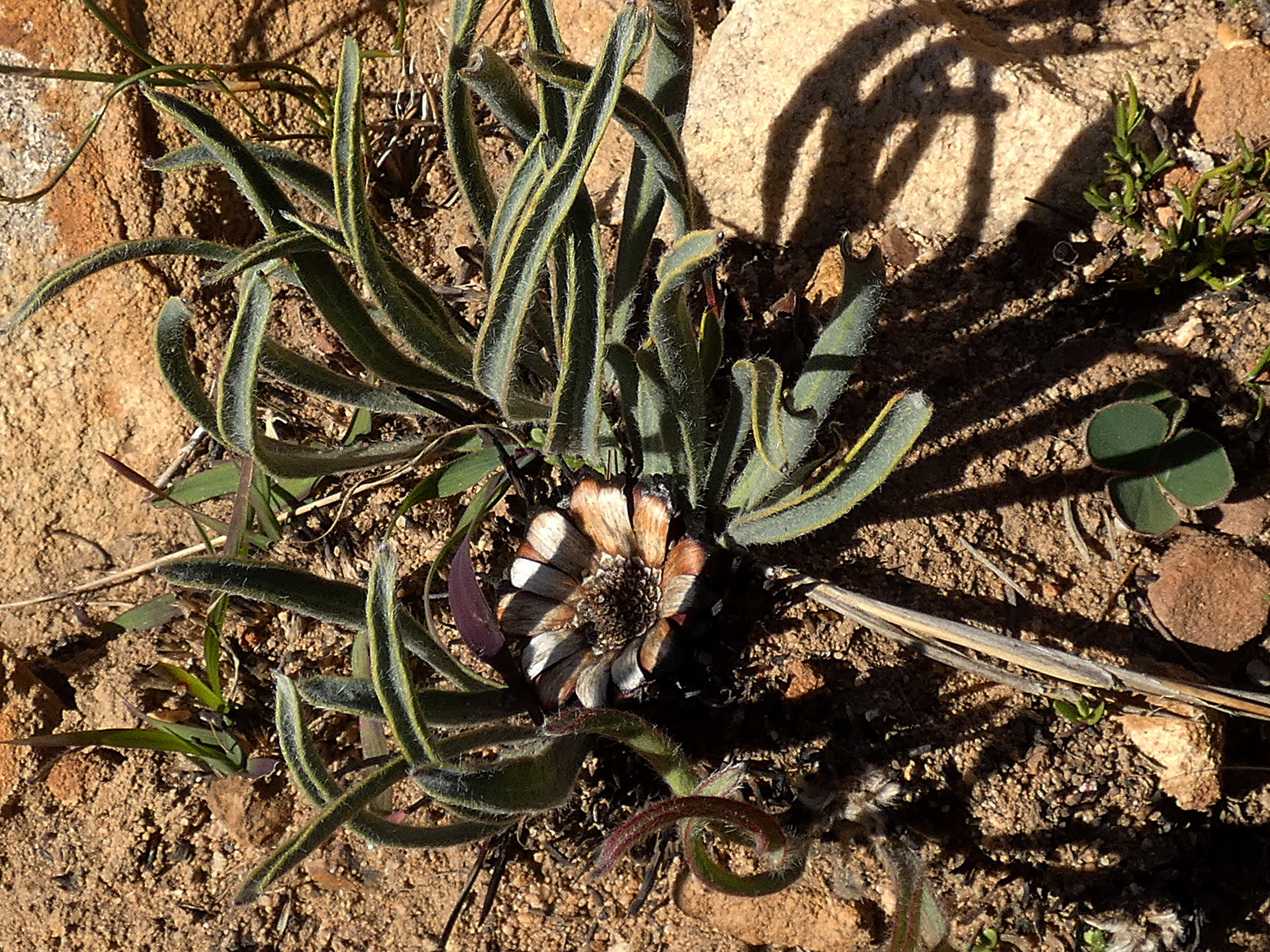
- Protea piscina on the Middelberg Pass with an old fruit, seen from above

Conservation status
- Least Concern (IUCN 3.1)

Scientific classification
- Kingdom: Plantae
- Clade: Embryophytes
- Clade: Tracheophytes
- Clade: Angiosperms
- Clade: Eudicots
- Order: Proteales
- Family: Proteaceae
- Genus: Protea
- Species: P. piscina

Binomial name
- Protea piscina Rourke

= Protea piscina =

Species of flowering plant

Protea piscina, also given the vernacular name Visgat sugarbush, is a shrub of the family Proteaceae that is native to South Africa. It is endemic to the southwestern Cape Provinces.
