= Xanthoparmelia subcolorata =

Scientific classification
- Kingdom: Fungi
- Division: Ascomycota
- Class: Lecanoromycetes
- Order: Lecanorales
- Family: Parmeliaceae
- Genus: Xanthoparmelia
- Species: X. subcolorata

Binomial name
- Xanthoparmelia subcolorata Hale (1986)

Species of lichen

Xanthoparmelia subcolorata is a species of saxicolous (rock-dwelling), foliose lichen in the family Parmeliaceae. Found in Southern Africa, it was formally described as a new species in 1986 by the American lichenologist Mason Hale. The type specimen was collected near the Swartberg Pass road at an elevation of 1,100 m (3,600 ft), where it was found growing on sloping sandstone boulders in fynbos vegetation. The lichen thallus, which is tightly to loosely attached to its rock substrate, is dark yellowish green in color and measures 6–8 cm (2.4–3.1 in) broad. Lobes making up the thallus are crowded together and overlapping, and measure 2–4 mm wide. The lichen contains protocetraric acid, usnic acid, and skyrin.

== See also ==
- List of Xanthoparmelia species
