= Garcia, South Africa =

Garcia
- Village
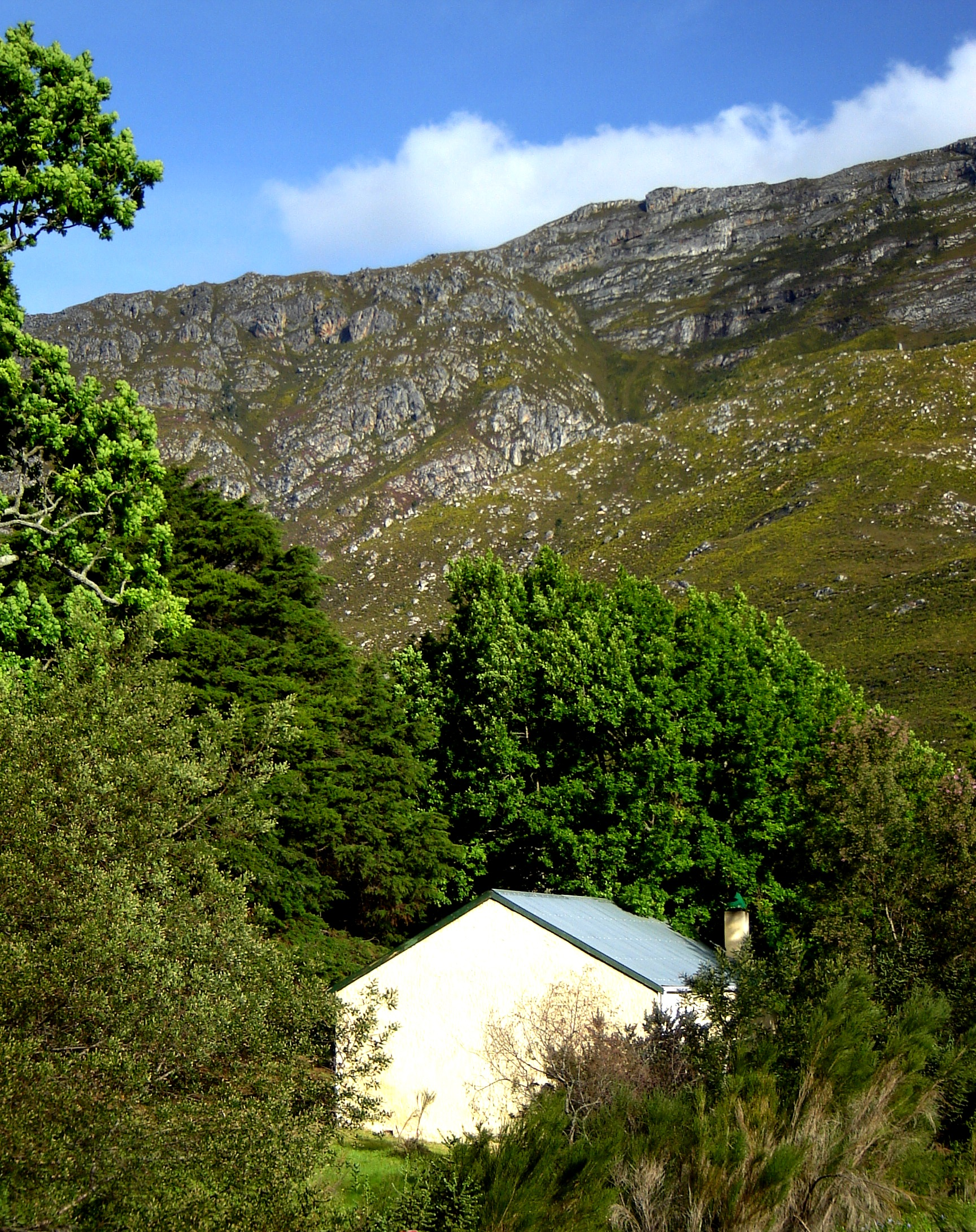
- The old Garcia's Pass tollhouse near the village

- Location within Western Cape Location within South Africa
- Coordinates: 34°00′56″S 21°13′32″E
- Country: South Africa
- Province: Western Cape
- District: Garden Route
- Municipality: Hessequa

Population
  - Total: 161

Racial Makeup (2011)
  - Coloured: 95.0%
  - White: 3.1%
  - Black African: 1.9%

First Languages (2011)
  - Afrikaans: 100.0%
- Time zone: UTC+2 (SAST)

Garcia is a small village in the Western Cape province of South Africa. The village is falls under the Hessequa Local Municipality and is about 8 km north of Riversdale. In the 2011 South African census the population of the village was 161 people. The settlement is next to Garcia's Pass, as well as named after it.
