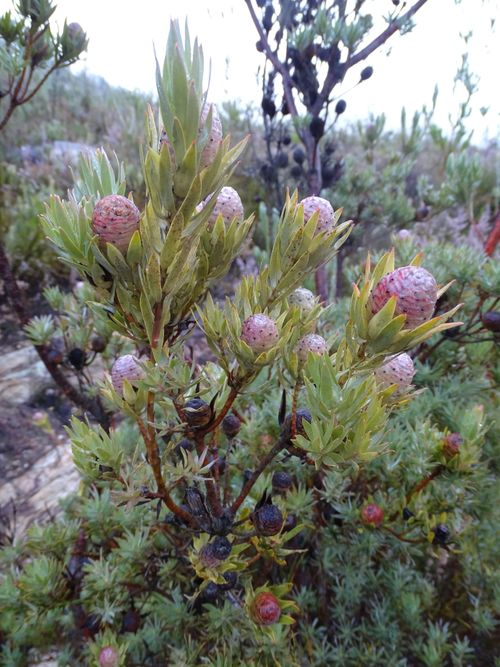
- Leucadendron uliginosum subsp. uliginosum observed in South Africa by Shaun Swanepoel

Conservation status
- Near Threatened (IUCN 3.1)

Scientific classification
- Kingdom: Plantae
- Clade: Tracheophytes
- Clade: Angiosperms
- Clade: Eudicots
- Order: Proteales
- Family: Proteaceae
- Genus: Leucadendron
- Species: L. uliginosum

Binomial name
- Leucadendron uliginosum R. Br., 1810

= Leucadendron uliginosum =

Species of flowering plant

Leucadendron uliginosum, commonly known as the Outeniqua conebush or Tsitsikamma conebush, is an evergreen flowering shrub endemic to the Western and Eastern Cape provinces of South Africa. It is a member of the Proteaceae family and is a characteristic component of the montane fynbos vegetation. It was described by and given the correct name by Robert Brown in 1810.

Two subspecies are recognized under L. uliginosum:

- Leucadendron uliginosum subsp. glabratum
- Leucadendron uliginosum subsp. uliginosum
