= Cloete's Pass =

Mountain pass in Western Cape, South Africa

Coordinates: 33°57′31.2″S 21°47′52.6″E

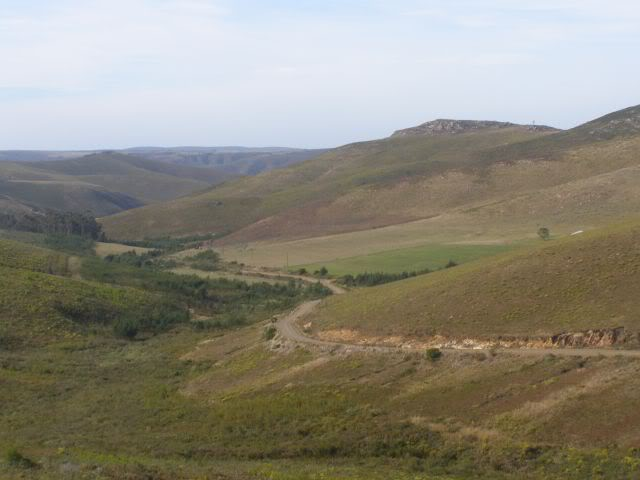
Part of the pass

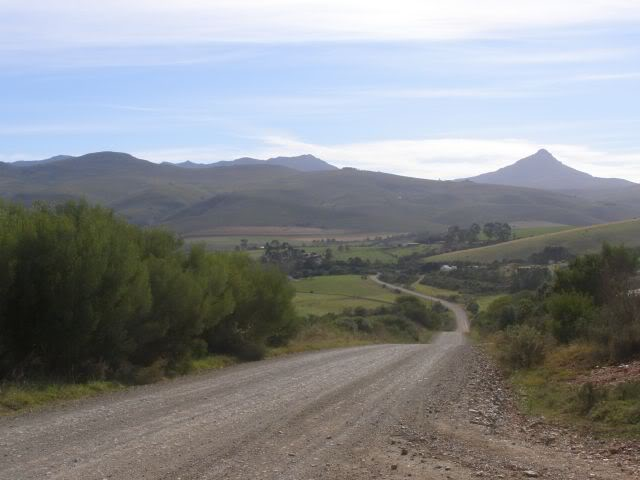
Another viewpoint

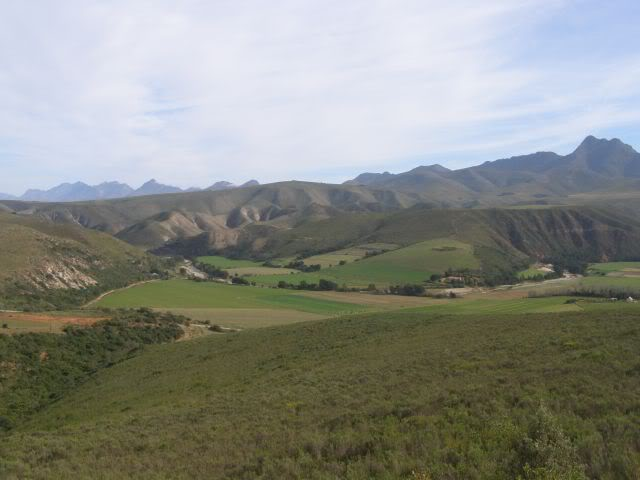
View of the pass from a distance

Cloete's Pass, also known as Cloeteskraal Pass and Bergkloof, is a mountain pass in the Western Cape province of South Africa, on the gravel Regional road R327 between Van Wyksdorp and Herbertsdale. It is a pass through the Langeberg mountain range, which separates the southern Cape coast from the Little Karoo. It is named after the Cloete family who owned the farm there. The pass features many flowering plants and ruins of old toll houses and blockhouses built by the British during the Anglo–Boer War.

The road through the pass was first built in the 1850s.
