= R316 (South Africa) =

Regional route in South Africa

Regional route R316
- R316 route map

Route information
- Length: 96 km (60 mi)

Major junctions
- Northwest end: N2 at Caledon
- R320 in Caledon; R326; R317 near Bredasdorp; R319 in Bredasdorp
- Southeast end: Arniston

Location
- Country: South Africa
- Major cities: Caledon, Napier, Bredasdorp, Arniston

Highway system
- Numbered routes of South Africa
← R315	→ R317

The R316 is a regional route in the Western Cape province of South Africa that connects Caledon to the northwest with Arniston to the southeast via Bredasdorp and Napier. It runs for 96 kilometres (60 mi). It maintains a south-easterly direction for most of its course.

== Route ==
The route begins at a junction with the N2 in Caledon. In Caledon, it gives off the R320 towards Hermanus. Leaving Caledon, its next major intersection is with the crossing R326. From there it continues to Napier and then Bredasdorp. Just outside Bredasdorp it receives R317, and in the town it overlaps with the R319. From Bredasdorp, the route reaches its coastal conclusion at Arniston.
