= R317 (South Africa) =

Regional route in South Africa

Regional route R317
- R317 route map

Route information
- Length: 100 km (62 mi)

Major junctions
- North end: R60
- N2
- South end: R316 and R319

Location
- Country: South Africa

Highway system
- Numbered routes of South Africa
← R316	→ R318

The R317 is a Regional Route in South Africa that connects Bredasdorp in the south with Robertson in the north via Bonnievale.

== Route ==
Its northerly origin in Robertson is from the R60. It leaves the town heading east, but veers south. It bypasses Bonnievale to the east, and then crosses the N2 at a staggered interchange. After this it meets the R316 and R319 at Bredasdorp.
