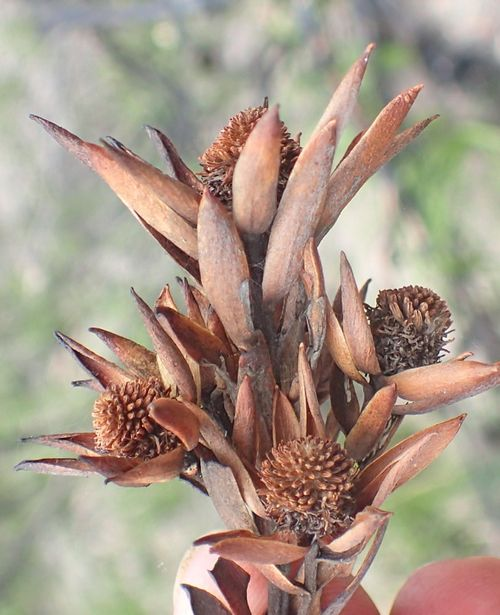
- Leucadendron uliginosum subsp. glabratum observed in South Africa by Nicola van Berkel

Conservation status
- Near Threatened (IUCN 3.1)

Scientific classification
- Kingdom: Plantae
- Clade: Tracheophytes
- Clade: Angiosperms
- Clade: Eudicots
- Order: Proteales
- Family: Proteaceae
- Genus: Leucadendron
- Species: L. uliginosum
- Subspecies: L. u. subsp. glabratum

Trinomial name
- Leucadendron uliginosum subsp. glabratum I.Williams, 1972

= Leucadendron uliginosum subsp. glabratum =

Subspecies of plant

Leucadendron uliginosum subsp. glabratum, the Tsitsikamma conebush, is a flowering shrub and subspecies of Leucadendron uliginosum, belonging to the genus Leucadendron and forming part of the fynbos biome. The species is endemic to the Western Cape and Eastern Cape where it occurs in the Tsitsikamma Mountains and Langkloof Mountains between Avontuur and Kareedouw.

The tree's FSA number is 82.5.
