= Bothmanskloof Pass =

Mountain pass in Western Cape, South Africa

Coordinates: 33°24′21.4″S 18°52′35.9″E

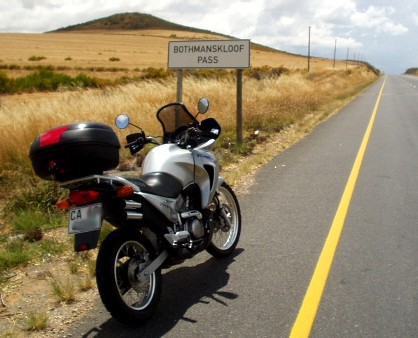
Pass signpost

Bothmanskloof Pass is situated in the Western Cape province of South Africa, on the R46 (a regional road) between Malmesbury and Riebeek Kasteel. It is also sometimes called Bothmaskloof or Botmans Kloof. The road through the pass dates to the 1700s.

This pass takes travelers over the mountain of Kasteelberg, and down to the lush Riebeek Valley, where the old town of Riebeek Kasteel is situated. In this valley, there are vineyards, wheat fields, and olive groves. Wine tours are popular here, and the wines are often paired with the locally grown olives.

There is a very deep cut through the top of the pass, which was created to ensure that the steep gradient is still safe for travelers to use. The cut is some 18 meters deep and the road is tarred.

A memorial situated just past Bothmanskloof's summit is dedicated to Pieter Cruythoff. He and his travelling companion, Pieter Meerhoff, discovered Kasteelberg and the Riebeek Valley in 1661. They named it after Jan van Riebeeck, who was one of the founders of Cape Town in 1652 and the administrator of the Dutch East India Company. These explorers claimed to have spotted quagga, black wildebeest, and rhinoceros in the valley.

Nearby to Bothmaskloof are the towns of Riebeek-Kasteel and Riebeek West. Cape Town is about 84 kilometres away.
