= R319 (South Africa) =

Regional route in South Africa

Regional route R319
- R319 route map

Route information
- Length: 97 km (60 mi)

Major junctions
- North end: N2
- R317; R316

Location
- Country: South Africa

Highway system
- Numbered routes of South Africa
| ← R318 | → R320 |

The R319 is a Regional Route in South Africa that connects L'Agulhas and Struisbaai in the south with the N2 near Swellendam via Bredasdorp.

== Route ==
From L'Agulhas, it follows the coast east to nearby Struisbaai. The roads then heads north and inland, bypassing Hotagterklip to the east. Near Bredasdorp it receives the R317. The routes enter the town together where they meet the R316. The R319 is the first to diverge on the other side of Bredasdorp and heads north-north-east to its terminus at the N2.
