= Blinkberg Pass =

Coordinates: 32°42′09.7″S 19°25′07.9″E

Blinkberg Pass (English: Glittering Mountain) is a mountain pass of the Cederberg mountains, Western Cape province of South Africa. It lies on the road between Prince Alfred's Hamlet and Wuppertal.

In 2021, two new genera of leafhoppers were found in the pass.
