= Akkedisberg Pass =

- Location within Western Cape
- Elevation: 160 metres (520 ft)

Third Approach
- Location: Western Cape, South Africa
- Coordinates: 34°24′32″S 19°34′47″E

Akkedisberg Pass is situated in the Western Cape province of South Africa, on the Regional road R326 (Western Cape) between Riviersonderend and Stanford.
