= Bosluiskloof Pass =

Mountain pass in Western Cape, South Africa

Coordinates: 33°20′31.8″S 21°29′06.7″E

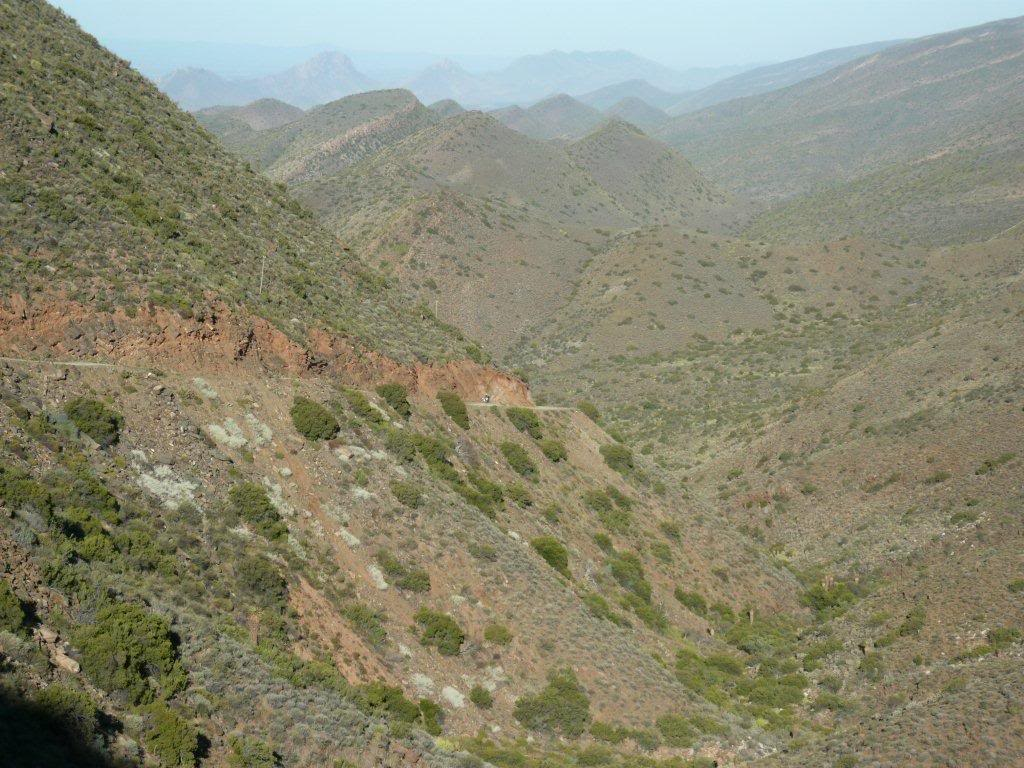
View down the pass

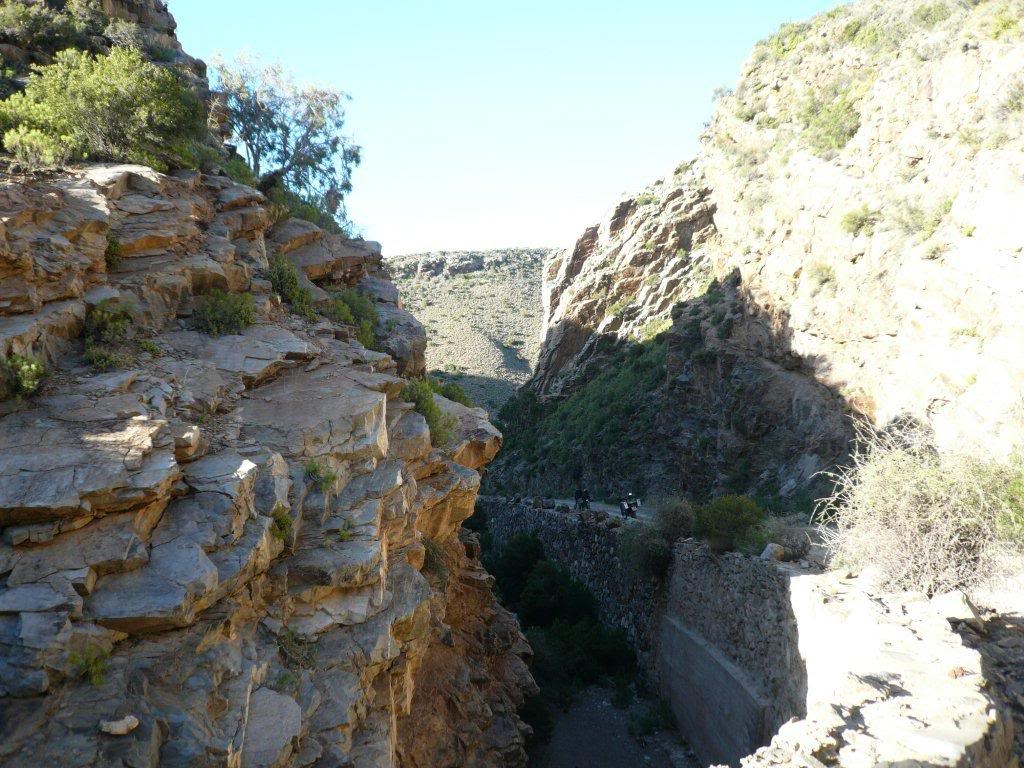
Scenery

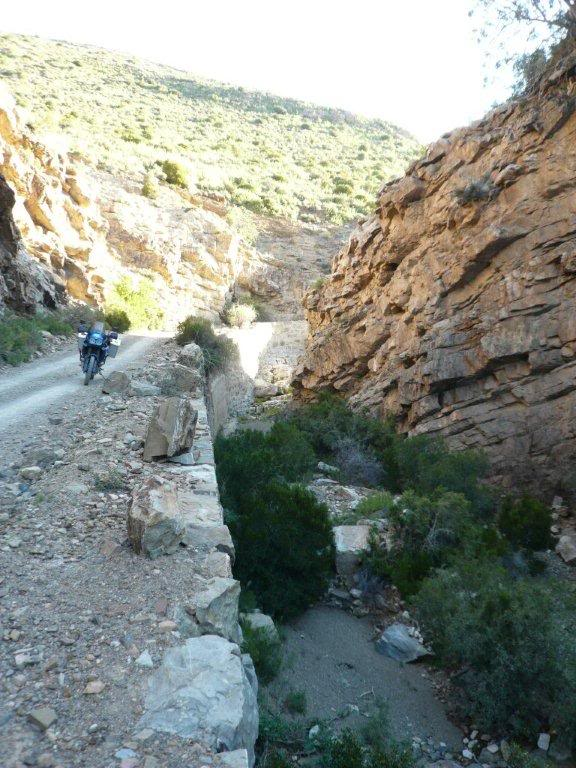
More scenery

Bosluiskloof Pass (English: Tick ravine) is located in the Western Cape province of South Africa on the road between Laingsburg and the Gamkapoort Dam, not far from the town of Ladismith. The road through the pass was originally built in 1862. The construction of the Gamkapoort Dam in 1968 blocked its use to travel on to Prince Albert.
