= Karatara Pass =

Mountain pass in Western Cape, South Africa

Coordinates: 33°55′29.2″S 22°50′59.7″E

Karatara Pass is a mountain pass situated in the Western Cape province of South Africa, on the "Passes Road" between Knysna and George. The road through the pass was completed in 1882, and the Passes Road as a whole was completed in 1883.

- Driving Skill level: Novice
- Road Condition: Tarred surface
- Remarks: Rural, tourist traffic, Historic seven passes road

== See also ==
- Karatara
