= Attakwaskloof Pass =

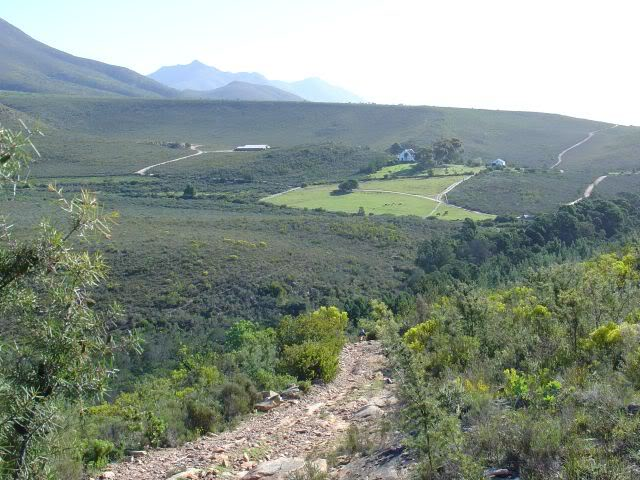
- Off-road details

- Location within Western Cape
- Elevation: 820 metres (2,690 ft)

Third Approach
- Location: Western Cape, South Africa
- Range: Outeniqua Mountains
- Coordinates: 33°50′33.1″S 21°58′59.4″E

The Attakwaskloof Pass (sometimes Attaquaskloof or Old ox-wagon route) is a mountain pass situated in the Western Cape province of South Africa on the off-road between Mossel Bay and Oudtshoorn.

== History ==
From early days a need for a link between the coast and the interior existed. With the arrival of settlers at the Cape, the need for a route between the Cape and the interior enjoyed a high priority and in 1689 the first documented crossing of the mountains over the Attakwaskloof took place. The Attakwaskloof Pass was used by elephants before the pass was built. This became the main road to the north for 180 years from 1689–1869 and was the most important route linking the area around Mossel Bay with Kannaland in the vicinity of Oudtshoorn. With the later construction of the Robinson Pass, the Attakwaskloof Pass fell into disuse. It has become part of Cape Nature Conservation and declared a National Monument in 1995.

== Geography ==
The Attakwaskloof pass is 10 kilometres (6.2 mi) long and reaches a height of 820 metres (2,690 ft) above sea level. It is over 300 years old. The pass offers spectacular scenery, natural rock pools, remains of historic buildings like block houses, an old hotel and toll houses.

== Map of the area ==
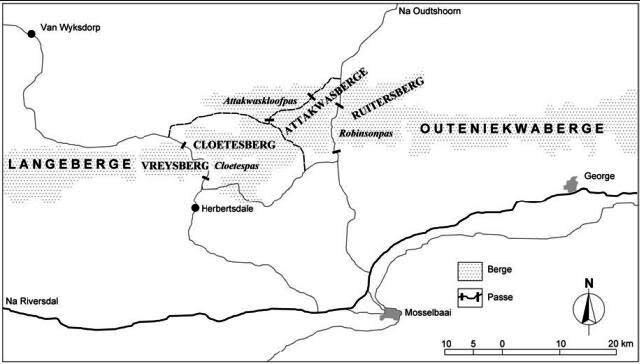
