= R318 (South Africa) =

Regional route in South Africa

Regional route R318
- R318 route map

Route information
- Length: 78.2 km (48.6 mi)

Major junctions
- North end: N1 near Touws River
- South end: R62 in Montagu

Location
- Country: South Africa

Highway system
- Numbered routes of South Africa
← R317	→ R319

The R318 is a Regional Route in Western Cape, South Africa that connects the N1 between De Doorns and Touws River in the north-west with Montagu in the south-east via the Koo and Keisie Valleys.

== Route ==
From its junction with the N1 south-west of Touws River and north-east of De Doorns, it heads south through the Rooihoogte Pass. After this pass, the route veers east through the Koo Valley then down Burgers Pass to run further east through the lower Keisie Valley. The route ends in Montagu at a junction with the R62.
