= R326 (South Africa) =

Regional route in South Africa

Regional route R326
- R326 route map

Route information
- Length: 50 km (31 mi)

Major junctions
- Southwest end: R43 at Stanford
- R316
- Northeast end: N2 near Riviersonderend

Location
- Country: South Africa

Highway system
- Numbered routes of South Africa
← R325	→ R327

The R326 is a regional route in the Western Cape province of South Africa that connects Stanford in the south-west to the N2 highway between Caledon and Riviersonderend to the north-east.

== Route ==
It begins at an intersection with the R43 at Stanford and runs east up the valley of the Klein River and over the Akkedisberg Pass. Once over the pass it crosses the R316 and continues north-east to end at the N2 10 kilometres (6 mi) west of Riviersonderend.
