= Dwarskloof Pass =

Coordinates: 34°06′00.7″S 19°36′52.9″E

Dwarskloof Pass, (English: Transverse Gap) is situated in the Western Cape, province of South Africa between Greyton and Caledon.
