= Otto Du Plessis Pass =

Coordinates: 31°14′04.6″S 27°31′49.6″E

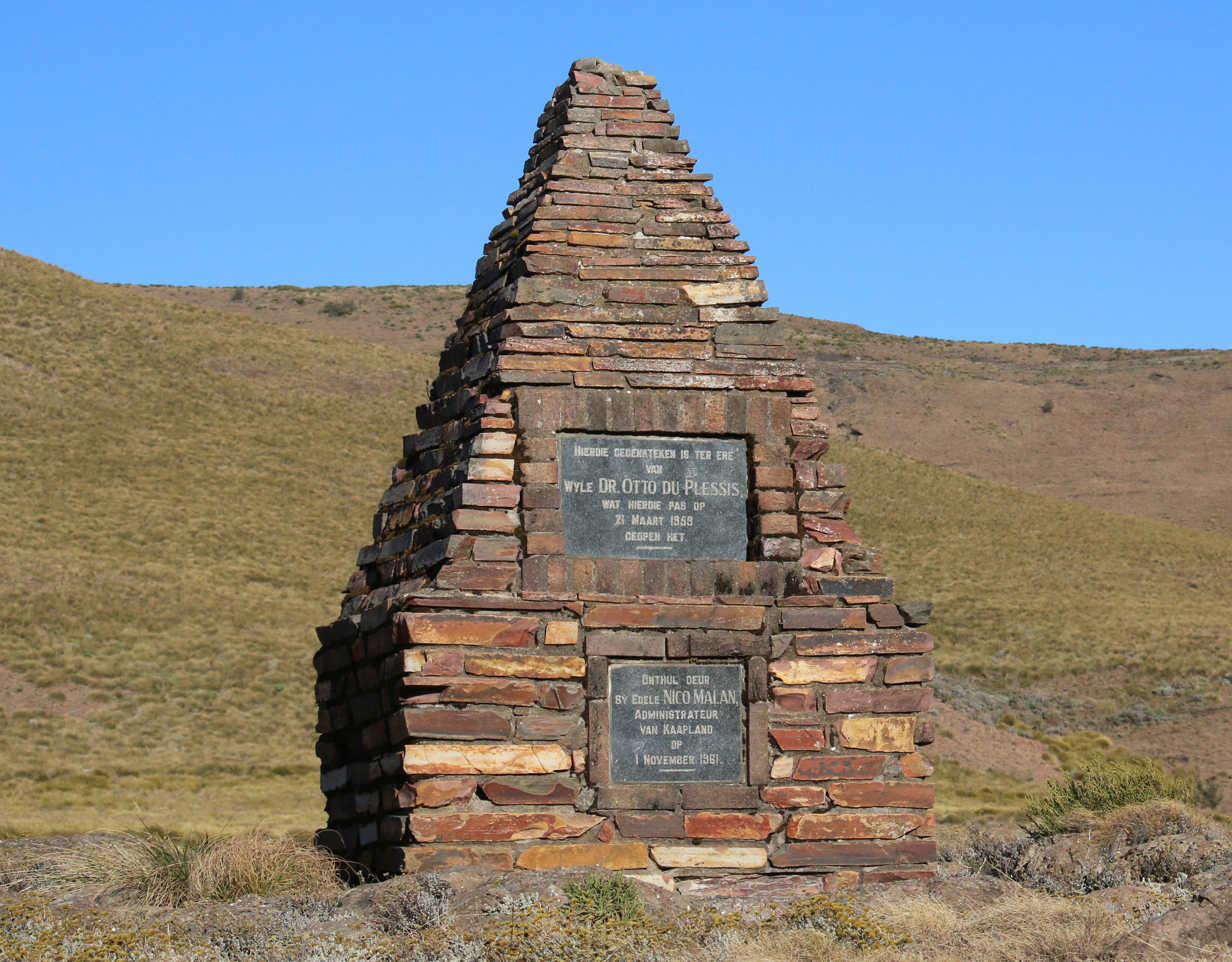
Monument at the top of the pass

Otto Du Plessis Pass is situated in the Eastern Cape province of South Africa, on a gravel road between Ida and Clifford, over the Drakensberg. The pass is 658 metres vertically and the total length is just under 10 km.

It was named after Josias Hendrik Otto du Plessis, Administrator of the Cape Province.
