= R328 (South Africa) =

Regional route in South Africa

Regional route R328
- R328 route map

Route information
- Length: 143 km (89 mi)

Major junctions
- North end: R407 near Prince Albert
- N12 / R62 in Oudtshoorn
- South end: R102 in Hartenbos

Location
- Country: South Africa

Highway system
- Numbered routes of South Africa
← R327	→ R329

The R328 is a Regional Route in Western Cape, South Africa that connects Mossel Bay in the south to Prince Albert in the north via Oudtshoorn.

== Route ==
Its northern origin is a junction with the R407 just south of Prince Albert. It heads south, approaching the Swartberg Mountains and it enters the Swartberg Pass. On the other side, it veers east-south-east. It gives off a short northern road to the Cango Caves just before turning south. It then heads south into the Schoemanspoort Pass. On the other side, it continues south to Oudtshoorn. At Oudtshoorn, it meets an intersection with the N12 and R62 and it becomes co-signed with the R62 westwards. Just outside the town, the route diverges from the R62 and continues in a southerly direction. It crosses the Outeniqua mountains at Robinson Pass to reach its terminus at a junction with the R102 at Hartenbos, just north of Mossel Bay.
