= List of heritage sites in Swellendam and Riversdale =

This is a list of the heritage sites in Swellendam (Overberg District Municipality) and Riversdale (Garden Route District Municipality), situated in the Western Cape, as recognized by the South African Heritage Resources Agency.

SAHRA identifier	Site name	Description	Town	District	NHRA status	Coordinates	Image
9/2/079/0001	Zeekoegat, Riversdale District	The Groote Wagen Weg or main wagon road from Swellendam to the east crossed the Buffelsjachts, Duivenhoks, Kafferkulls and the Gouritz Rivers. Even as early as 1750 there were several farmers living on farms along this road; one of them was Michael Muller; Type of site: Farmstead. A typical farm house of the eighteenth century. From here two expeditions set out in 1782 and 1790, respectively, in search of survivors of the wrecked ship, the Grosvenor.		Riversdale	Provincial Heritage Site	34°03′48″S 21°15′16″E	Upload Photo
9/2/079/0002	Jagersbosch, Still Bay, Riversdale District	A single storey white washed farm house with thick walls and a saddle roof with straight end gable The roof was originally thatched but on one side the thatch has been replaced by asbestos sheeting. The one end has an external masonry staircase to the lof This farm belonged to the De Jager Family, who also owned Palingsgat (Palingsfontein, Palingshuis) which was built in 1809 and rebuilt in 1814 after having been burnt down. One of the five sons of the original owner to Palingsgat built a bigger house on t Type of site: Farmstead This is one of the two original buildings in Still Bay, and is a very good example of a 19th century farmstead.		Riversdale	Provincial Heritage Site	34°22′02″S 21°25′03″E	Upload Photo
9/2/079/0003	Kleinfontein, Duiwehoks River, Riversdale District	H-shaped Cape Dutch house Type of site: Farm Kleinfontein, with the H-shaped Cape Dutch house thereon, lies in a basin at the widening of the Duiwenhoks River before it makes a final bend on its course to the Indian Ocean. The unrivalled and exceptional natural beauty together with the historic and		Riversdale	Provincial Heritage Site	34°05′53″S 21°15′47″E	Upload Photo
9/2/079/0004	Old Toll House, Garcia Pass, Riversdale District	This old toll-house, situated within the Kristalkloof Forest Reserve, is still in a very good state of preservation and stands, as it were, on an island between the old road passing in front of it and the new road passing behind it. A few old and tall cyp The pass was named in honour of the Commissioner of Riversdale at that time, A.H. Garcia. He himself went to investigate the feasibility of a road through the mountains and in 1872 the Cape Parliament decided that Garcia Pass would be constructed. Type of site: Toll The old Toll House was rebuilt in 1910 on the foundations of an earlier toll house and is a remnant of a system that played an important part in the history of transportation in South Africa.		Riversdale	Provincial Heritage Site	33°57′18″S 21°13′33″E	This old toll-house, situated within the Kristalkloof Forest Reserve, is still in a very good state of preservation and stands, as it were, on an island between the old road passing in front of it and the new road passing behind it. A few old and tall cyp The pass was named in honour of the Commissioner of Riversdale at that time, A.H. Garcia. He himself went to investigate the feasibility of a road through the mountains and in 1872 the Cape Parliament decided that Garcia Pass would be constructed. Type of site: Toll The old Toll House was rebuilt in 1910 on the foundations of an earlier toll house and is a remnant of a system that played an important part in the history of transportation in South Africa.
9/2/079/0005	Palingsgat Farmstead, Plattebosch, Still Bay, Riversdale District	Type of site: Farm Complex		Riversdale	Provincial Heritage Site	34°05′50″S 21°15′43″E	Upload Photo
9/2/079/0006	Masonic Lodge Frere and Hall, 10 Long Street, Riversdale	Type of site: Masonic Hall, Masonic Lodge	Riversdale	Riversdale	Provincial Heritage Site	34°05′21″S 21°15′43″E	Upload Photo
9/2/079/0007	Puntjie, 'Kapstylhuisies', Kleinfontein Farm, Riversdale District	Puntjie is an unintentional open-air museum of nearly seventy kapstylhuise (truss-style houses) or as they are called in that area, hartbeeshuisies The Kapstylhuis, as its name suggests, consists solely of a roof carried on a series of about eight couple Puntjie is a portion of the farm Kleinfontein. In the course of time fishermen and holidaymakers erected tents and later kapstylhuisies here without the consent of successive owners and often to their considerable annoyance. When Mr. Danie Hoffmann, who w Type of site: Kapstylhuisies These "Kapstylhuise" are examples of a style of construction of primitive houses adopted by the pioneers of the area.		Riversdale	Provincial Heritage Site	34°05′46″S 21°15′17″E	Puntjie is an unintentional open-air museum of nearly seventy kapstylhuise (truss-style houses) or as they are called in that area, hartbeeshuisies The Kapstylhuis, as its name suggests, consists solely of a roof carried on a series of about eight couple Puntjie is a portion of the farm Kleinfontein. In the course of time fishermen and holidaymakers erected tents and later kapstylhuisies here without the consent of successive owners and often to their considerable annoyance. When Mr. Danie Hoffmann, who w Type of site: Kapstylhuisies These "Kapstylhuise" are examples of a style of construction of primitive houses adopted by the pioneers of the area.
9/2/079/0010	RIVERSDALE MUNICIPAL AREA, GENERAL		Riversdale	Riversdale	Pending Declaration		Upload Photo
9/2/079/0011	Arcadia, Stilbaai, Riversdale District		Still Bay	Riversdale			Upload Photo
9/2/079/0012	STILL BAY MUNICIPAL AREA, RIVERSDALE DISTRICT, GENERAL		Still Bay	Riversdale			Upload Photo
9/2/079/0012-001	Die Rondawel and Die Wit Huisie, Strand Street, Jongensfontein, Riversdale District		Jongensfontein	Riversdale	Register	34°25′48″S 21°20′08″E	Upload Photo
9/2/079/0013	ALBERTINIA MUNICIPAL AREA, RIVERSDALE DISTRICT, GENERAL		Albertinia	Riversdale			Upload Photo
9/2/079/0014	Garcia State Forest, Riversdale District		Riversdale	Riversdale		33°57′21″S 21°12′01″E	Upload Photo
9/2/079/0015	Versveld House, Long Street, Riversdale	This predominantly Georgian house was erected by Dirk Versfeld (1853-1912) shortly after 1882 and donated to the City Council of Riversdale by his son, Theodore, to house the Julius Gordon art collection. The building was restored in 1965.	Riversdale	Riversdale	Provincial Heritage Site	34°05′58″S 21°16′03″E	This predominantly Georgian house was erected by Dirk Versfeld (1853-1912) shortly after 1882 and donated to the City Council of Riversdale by his son, Theodore, to house the Julius Gordon art collection. The building was restored in 1965.
9/2/079/0016	St Matthews Anglican Church, Riversdale		Riversdale	Riversdale	National Monument		Upload Photo
9/2/079/0017	Beach cottages, Stilbaai, Riversdale District		Still Bay	Riversdale	Pending Declaration		Upload Photo
9/2/079/0017/1	Beach cottages, Stilbaai East, Riversdale District		Still Bay	Riversdale			Upload Photo
9/2/079/0017/2	Beach cottages, Stilbaai West, Riversdale District		Still Bay	Riversdale			Upload Photo
9/2/079/0018	RIVERSDALE MAGISTERIAL DISTRICT, GENERAL		Riversdale	Riversdale			Upload Photo
9/2/079/0019	GOURITSMOND MUNICIPAL AREA, GENERAL, RIVERSDALE		Gouritsmond	Riversdale			Upload Photo
9/2/079/0020	Fish Traps, Rein's Nature Reserve, Farm Buffelshoek 455, Riversdale		Riversdale	Riversdale			Upload Photo
9/2/092/0001	Old St Luke's School, 74-76 Voortrek Street, Swellendam	Mid 19th century, single storied, flat roofed building with handsome cornice. Reused as the school to children of Congregation using St. Luke's. School building and adjacent St. Lukes make a contrasting and historical pair. Very important. Type of site: School Previous use: School. Current use: Offices.	Swellendam	Swellendam	Provincial Heritage Site	34°01′13″S 20°26′39″E	Mid 19th century, single storied, flat roofed building with handsome cornice. Reused as the school to children of Congregation using St. Luke's. School building and adjacent St. Lukes make a contrasting and historical pair. Very important. Type of site: School Previous use: School. Current use: Offices.
9/2/092/0002	Voortrekkersaal, Swellendam		Swellendam	Swellendam	National Monument		Upload Photo
9/2/092/0003	Stormsvlei Complex, Swellendam District		Swellendam	Swellendam		34°05′01″S 20°05′50″E	Upload Photo
9/2/092/0004	SWELLENDAM MUNICIPAL AREA, GENERAL		Swellendam	Swellendam	Pending		Upload Photo
9/2/092/0005	Rheenendal Mill, Swellendam District	This mill-house consists of a double-storeyed Georgian building which dated from about 1880 and is closely associated with the development of industrial architecture in South Africa. The mill-wheel is of the overshot type. Type of site: Mill Previous use: Mill. This mill-house consists of a double-storeyed Georgian building which dated from about 1880 and is closely associated with the development of industrial architecture in South Africa. The mill-wheel is of the overshot type.		Swellendam	Provincial Heritage Site	34°02′21″S 20°26′22″E	Upload Photo
9/2/092/0006	Mission core, The Braak, Suurbrak		Suurbraak	Swellendam	Provisional Protection	34°01′00″S 20°39′00″E	
9/2/092/0007	Mill Cottage, 243 Voortrek Street, Swellendam		Swellendam	Swellendam	Provincial Heritage Site	34°02′12″S 20°25′33″E	Upload Photo
9/2/092/0008	Church Square, Swellendam	Type of site: Square.	Swellendam	Swellendam	Provincial Heritage Site	34°01′13″S 20°26′42″E	Type of site: Square.
9/2/092/0009	Moolmanshof, 217 Voortrek Street, Swellendam	The oldest portion of this impressive dwelling-house was erected in 1798 by Christiaan Essenberg, an immigrant from Switzerland. The house was enlarged in the 1840s by I. Z. Moolman and named Moolmanshof. It is one of the oldest buildings in Swellendam.	Swellendam	Swellendam	Provincial Heritage Site	34°02′04″S 20°25′42″E	Upload Photo
9/2/092/0010	"La Bella Alliance", Swellengrebel Street, Swellendam		Swellendam	Swellendam	National Monument	34°01′02″S 20°26′59″E	Upload Photo
9/2/092/0011	Bukkenburg House, 8 Hermanus Steyn Street, Swellendam	This late nineteenth century dwelling, with its predominantly Victorian features, forms an integral part of the historic core of Swellendam in the immediate vicinity of the Drostdy.	Swellendam	Swellendam	Provincial Heritage Site	34°01′09″S 20°27′04″E	This late nineteenth century dwelling, with its predominantly Victorian features, forms an integral part of the historic core of Swellendam in the immediate vicinity of the Drostdy.
9/2/092/0012	Die Tuishuise, 2-4 Shand Street, Swellendam	Across the main road from the Auld House in Swellendam there is a very interesting historical group – a small square, a row of tuishuise or farmers' town houses and The Cottage. The peaceful square with ancient oaks along three sides of it, is old. It pro. Die Tuishuise were built about the middle of the nineteenth century by distinguished residents of Swellendam and are of considerable architectural importance.	Swellendam	Swellendam	Provincial Heritage Site	34°01′00″S 20°26′51″E	Upload Photo
9/2/092/0013	Homestead, Klip River 192, Swellendam District	During the years 1833-1837 the farm Kliprivier was owned by Marthinus Steyn, great grandfather of President M T Steyn and the builder of the magnificent homestead. The farm was also owned by President F W Reitz during the years 1869-1899. During the years 1833-1837 the farm Kliprivier was owned by Marthinus Steyn, great grandfather of President M T Steyn and the builder of the magnificent homestead. The farm was also owned by President F W Reitz during the years 1869-1899.		Swellendam	Provincial Heritage Site	34°01′50″S 20°26′16″E	Upload Photo
9/2/092/0014	Charcoal kiln, Voorhuis, Swellendam District	This charcoal oven was built about the middle of the 18th century by Hermanus Steyn and is the oldest known structure of its kind in South Africa. Type of site: Charcoal kiln. This charcoal oven was built about the middle of the 18th century by Hermanus Steyn and is the oldest known structure of its kind in South Africa.		Swellendam	Provincial Heritage Site	34°01′32″S 20°26′22″E	Upload Photo
9/2/092/0015	241 Voortrek Street, Swellendam		Swellendam	Swellendam	National Monument	34°02′12″S 20°25′35″E	Upload Photo
9/2/092/0016	198 Voortrek Street, Swellendam		Swellendam	Swellendam		34°01′38″S 20°26′05″E	Upload Photo
9/2/092/0017	27 Berg Street, Swellendam	These four dwelling-houses with their Victoria characteristics all date from the nineteenth century or the first decade of the twentieth century and form an integral part of the historical and architectural core of Swellendam.	Swellendam	Swellendam	Provincial Heritage Site	34°00′56″S 20°27′15″E	Upload Photo
9/2/092/0018	Kinkoe Farm, Swellendam		Swellendam	Swellendam	National Monument	34°06′38″S 20°34′39″E	Upload Photo
9/2/092/0019	14 Drostdy Street, Swellendam	The core of this Victorian house, originally erected in the Cape Dutch style, dates from the eighteenth century. The house was, however, extensively Victorianised during the mid-nineteenth century by raising the roof level considerably and the addition of The core of this victorianised house, originally in the Cape Dutch style, dates from the Eighteenth Century and was reputedly the stable, coach-house and saddler's dwelling serving the Drostdy complex. The core of this victorianised house, originally in the Cape Dutch style, dates from the Eighteenth Century and was reputedly the stable, coach-house and saddler's dwelling serving the Drostdy complex.	Swellendam	Swellendam	Provincial Heritage Site	34°01′16″S 20°27′06″E	Upload Photo
9/2/092/0020	Conniston, 21 Van Oudtshoorn Road, Swellendam		Swellendam	Swellendam	National Monument	34°00′58″S 20°26′55″E	Upload Photo
9/2/092/0021	Hope Lodge, 218 Voortrek Street, Swellendam	These four dwelling-houses with their Victorian characteristics all date from the nineteenth century or the first decade of the twentieth century and form an integral part of the historical and architectural core of Swellendam.	Swellendam	Swellendam	Provincial Heritage Site	34°01′47″S 20°25′57″E	Upload Photo
9/2/092/0022	Auld House, 4 Voortrek Street, Swellendam	A short way above the "Oefeninghuis" in the main street of Swellendam stands a fine Cape house with white gables and a thatched roof. It is the spiritual home of the Barry family in South Africa. The name of Joseph Barry is legendary in the history of the "Auld House" which is a particularly fine old Cape house with interesting associations with the historic Barry family.	Swellendam	Swellendam	Provincial Heritage Site	34°01′03″S 20°26′52″E	A short way above the "Oefeninghuis" in the main street of Swellendam stands a fine Cape house with white gables and a thatched roof. It is the spiritual home of the Barry family in South Africa. The name of Joseph Barry is legendary in the history of the "Auld House" which is a particularly fine old Cape house with interesting associations with the historic Barry family.
9/2/092/0023	The Glen, Glen Barry Road, Swellendam	The property on which this Cape Dutch house is situated was originally granted to Johannes Matthys Ebersohn in 1799 who initially erected a T-shaped house. Jan Ferdinand Bam converted it into an H-shaped house early in the nineteenth century. The property on which this Cape Dutch house is situated was originally granted to Johannes Matthys Ebersohn in 1799 who initially erected a T-shaped house. Jan Ferdinand Bam converted it into an H-shaped house early in the nineteenth century.	Swellendam	Swellendam	Provincial Heritage Site	34°00′39″S 20°27′04″E	Upload Photo
9/2/092/0024	Dwelling, cnr Van Riebeeck & Tilney Streets, Barrydale, Swellendam		Barrydale	Swellendam	National Monument	33°54′08″S 20°43′25″E	Upload Photo
9/2/092/0025	10 Trichard Street, Swellendam		Swellendam	Swellendam	Pending	34°01′18″S 20°26′42″E	Upload Photo
9/2/092/0026	JVDS House, 266/268 Voortrek Street, Swellendam	JVDS house, gable date 1834. Also one of the Rothman properties. Known as Rothman House. Early 19th century T-shaped house in excellent condition. Also adjacent cottage. Property is of considerable architectural, historical and environmental importance cu Type of site: House Current use: House.	Swellendam	Swellendam	Provincial Heritage Site	34°02′12″S 20°25′37″E	JVDS house, gable date 1834. Also one of the Rothman properties. Known as Rothman House. Early 19th century T-shaped house in excellent condition. Also adjacent cottage. Property is of considerable architectural, historical and environmental importance cu Type of site: House Current use: House.
9/2/092/0027	9 Moolman Street, Swellendam	This, is a mid-nineteenth-century building complex consisting of a self-contained dwelling at each end and joined by a row of three rooms. All are on different levels, it has been consolidated into one dwelling by means of minor internal alterations. All. This mid-nineteenth century structure consists of two self-contained units joined by a row of three rooms in the centre. It was reputedly part of a row of "tuishuisies" near the Dutch Reformed Church.	Swellendam	Swellendam	Provincial Heritage Site	34°01′37″S 20°25′56″E	Upload Photo
9/2/092/0028	Old Drostdy, 2 Drostdy Street, Swellendam	The Heemraad chose an excellent site for their Drostdy. It is situated to the east of the Korenlands River, on the road to the Cape and commands a fine view across the valley to the Langeberg Range and the towering Twelve O’Clock Peak. Building of the Dro Type of site: Drostdy.	Swellendam	Swellendam	Provincial Heritage Site	34°01′11″S 20°27′12″E	The Heemraad chose an excellent site for their Drostdy. It is situated to the east of the Korenlands River, on the road to the Cape and commands a fine view across the valley to the Langeberg Range and the towering Twelve O’Clock Peak. Building of the Dro Type of site: Drostdy.
9/2/092/0029	Dutch Reformed Church, 11 Voortrek Street, Swellendam	Type of site: Church Current use: Church : Dutch Reformed. The corner-stone of this building was laid on 25 November 1910. The church with its diversity of architectural syles was officially inaugurated on 10 June 1911 by Prof. C F J Muller. The decorated entrance archway and gates are the only remains of the ear	Swellendam	Swellendam	Provincial Heritage Site	34°01′04″S 20°26′47″E	Type of site: Church Current use: Church : Dutch Reformed. The corner-stone of this building was laid on 25 November 1910. The church with its diversity of architectural syles was officially inaugurated on 10 June 1911 by Prof. C F J Muller. The decorated entrance archway and gates are the only remains of the ear
9/2/092/0029/1	Arch and gate, Voortrek Street, Swellendam		Swellendam	Swellendam	National Monument		Upload Photo
9/2/092/0030	Rose Cottage, 245 Voortrek Street, Swellendam	This double-storeyed rectangular house, dating from about 1840, was presumably built by W M Hopley, a well-known local land surveyor.	Swellendam	Swellendam	Provincial Heritage Site	34°02′13″S 20°25′32″E	Upload Photo
9/2/092/0031	Schoone Oordt, 1 Swellengrebel Street, Swellendam	This double-storeyed house was built in 1853 in the Cape Georgian style and victorianised in the late-nineteenth century by the addition of a cast-iron verandah on both levels. The outbuildings, consisting of the original coach house and what is believed.	Swellendam	Swellendam	Provincial Heritage Site	34°01′02″S 20°26′59″E	This double-storeyed house was built in 1853 in the Cape Georgian style and victorianised in the late-nineteenth century by the addition of a cast-iron verandah on both levels. The outbuildings, consisting of the original coach house and what is believed.
9/2/092/0032	10 Moolman Street, Swellendam	This cottage, which is predominantly in the Cape vernacular style, dates from the middle of the nineteenth century.	Swellendam	Swellendam	Provincial Heritage Site	34°01′37″S 20°25′59″E	Upload Photo
9/2/092/0033	Rotterdam, Swellendam District	The farm Rotterdam, which was granted to Hendrik van Vollenhoven by Governor J. H. van Plettenberg in 1783, was transferred to Landdrost Anthonie Faure in 1794. The main homestead, the Baroque front gable of which bears the date 1794, was erected by him.		Swellendam	Provincial Heritage Site	34°01′32″S 20°26′10″E	Upload Photo
9/2/092/0034	Park Villa, 23 Van Oudtshoorn Street, Swellendam	Type of site: House. This house was originally a T-shaped Cape Dutch building that was erected about 1802. It was subsequently Victorianised, but still retained many Cape Dutch features.	Swellendam	Swellendam	Provincial Heritage Site	34°00′59″S 20°26′54″E	Upload Photo
9/2/092/0035	9 Siebert Street, Swellendam	These four dwelling-houses with their Victoria characteristics all date from the nineteenth century or the first decade of the twentieth century and form an integral part of the historical and architectural core of Swellendam.	Swellendam	Swellendam	Provincial Heritage Site	34°01′23″S 20°26′35″E	Upload Photo
9/2/092/0036	Old Gaol, 24, 26, 28 Swellengrebel Street, Swellendam	The building which, after so many years, is still called the Old Gaol is second only to the Drostdy, as the oldest and most interesting building in Swellendam. The oldest known drawing of the Drostdy complex drawn by Schumacher in 1776, shows the gaol alr Type of site: Gaol.	Swellendam	Swellendam	Provincial Heritage Site	34°01′07″S 20°27′09″E	The building which, after so many years, is still called the Old Gaol is second only to the Drostdy, as the oldest and most interesting building in Swellendam. The oldest known drawing of the Drostdy complex drawn by Schumacher in 1776, shows the gaol alr Type of site: Gaol.
9/2/092/0037	Old Post Office, 22 Swellengrebel Street, Swellendam	Diagonally opposite the Drostdy and immediately next to the Old Gaol, there is a small house with a thatched roof and thick walls. High up in the heavy yellow-wood front door there is a slot for receiving letters. This little building, still known as the Old Post Office was the residence of the gaoler. In the earliest days of the postal service at the Cape, the salary of a postmaster was so small that the appointment was held by someone who also performed some other Type of site: Post Office Previous use: Post office.	Swellendam	Swellendam	Provincial Heritage Site	34°01′07″S 20°27′09″E	Diagonally opposite the Drostdy and immediately next to the Old Gaol, there is a small house with a thatched roof and thick walls. High up in the heavy yellow-wood front door there is a slot for receiving letters. This little building, still known as the Old Post Office was the residence of the gaoler. In the earliest days of the postal service at the Cape, the salary of a postmaster was so small that the appointment was held by someone who also performed some other Type of site: Post Office Previous use: Post office.
9/2/092/0038	Oak trees, Swellengrebel Street, Swellendam	Swellengrebel Street which passes in front of the Drostdy is a part of the original Cape Wagon Road or Groote Wagenweg, the route of the earliest expeditions into the interior. It presumably already existed when the Drostdy was built in 1746. Where there Type of site: Tree.	Swellendam	Swellendam	Provincial Heritage Site	34°01′17″S 20°26′31″E	Upload Photo
9/2/092/0039	The Oefeninghuis, 36 Voortrek Street, Swellendam	Swellendam, one of the oldest towns in South Africa, holds a particular fascination for visitors. This may be due to the fact that many of the original houses in the main street in the older part of the town are still standing and thus preserve something.	Swellendam	Swellendam	Provincial Heritage Site	34°01′09″S 20°26′45″E	Swellendam, one of the oldest towns in South Africa, holds a particular fascination for visitors. This may be due to the fact that many of the original houses in the main street in the older part of the town are still standing and thus preserve something.
9/2/092/0040	The Cottage, 5 Voortrek Street, Swellendam	The Cottage is a worthy T -shaped old Cape house, probably built in 1832. Across the main road from the Auld House in Swellendam there is a very interesting historical group – a small square, a row of tuishuise or farmers' town houses and The Cottage. Th. "The Cottage" is a worthy T-shaped old Cape house, probably built in 1832.	Swellendam	Swellendam	Provincial Heritage Site	34°01′01″S 20°26′52″E	The Cottage is a worthy T -shaped old Cape house, probably built in 1832. Across the main road from the Auld House in Swellendam there is a very interesting historical group – a small square, a row of tuishuise or farmers' town houses and The Cottage. Th. "The Cottage" is a worthy T-shaped old Cape house, probably built in 1832.
9/2/092/0041	Dutch Reformed Church, Malgas, Swellendam District	This attractive stone church dates from the middle of the nineteenth century when Malgas was a flourishing inland harbour on the Breede River. Type of site: Church Current use: Church : Dutch Reformed.		Swellendam	Provincial Heritage Site	34°01′14″S 20°27′00″E	This attractive stone church dates from the middle of the nineteenth century when Malgas was a flourishing inland harbour on the Breede River. Type of site: Church Current use: Church : Dutch Reformed.
9/2/092/0042	Old Residency, 12 Van Oudtshoorn Road, Swellendam	The property was granted to Thomas Barry in 1839, who apparently built the house without delay. Later it became the residence of the magistrate and was known as the Residency. It has recently been purchased and restored by Historical Homes Limited. Swell Type of site: Residency. The property was granted to Thomas Barry in 1839, who apparently built the house without delay. Later it became the residence of the magistrate and was known as the Residency. It has recently been purchased and restored by Historical Homes Limited.	Swellendam	Swellendam	Provincial Heritage Site	34°00′52″S 20°26′59″E	The property was granted to Thomas Barry in 1839, who apparently built the house without delay. Later it became the residence of the magistrate and was known as the Residency. It has recently been purchased and restored by Historical Homes Limited. Swell Type of site: Residency. The property was granted to Thomas Barry in 1839, who apparently built the house without delay. Later it became the residence of the magistrate and was known as the Residency. It has recently been purchased and restored by Historical Homes Limited.
9/2/092/0043	Old High School for Boys, 147 Voortrek Street, Swellendam	Situated against the slope, it commanded a view of the entire valley and the beautiful frontal aspect must have been impressive. In fact, it still is. A double flight of steps leads to the huge front-door with its fanlike fanlight. The land on which this H-shaped house is situated was granted to Jacobus Wessel van Dijk in 1818. He was one of the well-known wainwrights of Swellendam and built the house round 1825. In 1839 Van Dijk sold the property and several Wainwrights owned the Type of site: School Previous use: School. The land was granted in 1818 to J W van Dyk, a wagonmaker who built the house in about 1825. There was a wagon-builder's workshop in the basement up to 1870. The building was then purchased for a school and Dr D F Malan taught there in 1896. It has been r	Swellendam	Swellendam	Provincial Heritage Site	34°01′38″S 20°26′02″E	Situated against the slope, it commanded a view of the entire valley and the beautiful frontal aspect must have been impressive. In fact, it still is. A double flight of steps leads to the huge front-door with its fanlike fanlight. The land on which this H-shaped house is situated was granted to Jacobus Wessel van Dijk in 1818. He was one of the well-known wainwrights of Swellendam and built the house round 1825. In 1839 Van Dijk sold the property and several Wainwrights owned the Type of site: School Previous use: School. The land was granted in 1818 to J W van Dyk, a wagonmaker who built the house in about 1825. There was a wagon-builder's workshop in the basement up to 1870. The building was then purchased for a school and Dr D F Malan taught there in 1896. It has been r
9/2/092/0044	18 Swellengrebel Street, Swellendam	This land formed part of the original Drostdy property which was subdivided in 1799. The house is a Georgian double-storeyed building dating from the middle of the last century and is architecturally outstanding. This land formed part of the original Drostdy property which was subdivided in 1799. The house is a Georgian double-storeyed building dating from the middle of the last century and is architecturally outstanding.	Swellendam	Swellendam	Provincial Heritage Site	34°01′06″S 20°27′07″E	This land formed part of the original Drostdy property which was subdivided in 1799. The house is a Georgian double-storeyed building dating from the middle of the last century and is architecturally outstanding. This land formed part of the original Drostdy property which was subdivided in 1799. The house is a Georgian double-storeyed building dating from the middle of the last century and is architecturally outstanding.
9/2/092/0045	Morgenzon, 16 Van Oudtshoorn Drive, Swellendam	This U-shaped Cape Dutch house was erected in about 1745 as dwelling for the Secretary of the local Drostdy. From 1855 to 1875 it was used as an exclusive school for girls. This U-shaped Cape Dutch house was erected in about 1745 as dwelling for the Secretary of the local Drostdy. From 1855 to 1875 it was used as an exclusive school for girls.	Swellendam	Swellendam	Provincial Heritage Site	34°00′57″S 20°26′59″E	Upload Photo
9/2/092/0046	Mayville, 4 Hermanus Steyn Street, Swellendam	This property is situated on land which originally formed part of the historical Drostdy complex in Swellendam. The house was built about 1853 for the owner, Daniël de Bruyn. Type of site: House Previous use: Residential. Current use: Museum. The property is situated on land which originally formed part of the historical Drostdy complex in Swellendam. The house was built about 1853 for the owner, Daniel de Bruyn.	Swellendam	Swellendam	Provincial Heritage Site	34°01′07″S 20°27′03″E	This property is situated on land which originally formed part of the historical Drostdy complex in Swellendam. The house was built about 1853 for the owner, Daniël de Bruyn. Type of site: House Previous use: Residential. Current use: Museum. The property is situated on land which originally formed part of the historical Drostdy complex in Swellendam. The house was built about 1853 for the owner, Daniel de Bruyn.
9/2/092/0047	Old Powder Magazine, 9 Gelderblom Street, Swellendam	Swellendam was still a fairly remote outpost of civilisation at the beginning of the 19th century. The inhabitants of the district strongly opposed the administration at the Cape, and this resulted in much dissatisfaction and even open revolt. A vital co Type of site: Powder Magazine Previous use: Powder magazine. This simple rectangular powder magazine dates from the middle of the nineteenth century and was possibly erected by the well-known firm, Barry and Nephews. The property was owned by Cornelius Human, well known character that owned Human's Garage in town in the mid 20th century up to 1948. Before and during WWII he used it for aircraft fuel storage as he was the appointed supplier of fuel at the air strip which is in the Bontebok Park today. Both his children were born in the house, and I am one of them! – Piet Human. On the day we buried our mother in Swellendam, I visited this property and was surprised to see that the outbuilding is now a national monument – with an upside down mounted commission plaque!	Swellendam	Swellendam	Provincial Heritage Site	34°01′02″S 20°26′41″E	Swellendam was still a fairly remote outpost of civilisation at the beginning of the 19th century. The inhabitants of the district strongly opposed the administration at the Cape, and this resulted in much dissatisfaction and even open revolt. A vital co Type of site: Powder Magazine Previous use: Powder magazine. This simple rectangular powder magazine dates from the middle of the nineteenth century and was possibly erected by the well-known firm, Barry and Nephews. The property was owned by Cornelius Human, well known character that owned Human's Garage in town in the mid 20th century up to 1948. Before and during WWII he used it for aircraft fuel storage as he was the appointed supplier of fuel at the air strip which is in the Bontebok Park today. Both his children were born in the house, and I am one of them! – Piet Human. On the day we buried our mother in Swellendam, I visited this property and was surprised to see that the outbuilding is now a national monument – with an upside down mounted commission plaque!
9/2/092/0048	11 Van Oudtshoorn Drive, Swellendam	This dwelling-house, with its Victorian and Edwardian features, dates from the first decade of the twentieth century.	Swellendam	Swellendam	Provincial Heritage Site	34°00′52″S 20°26′56″E	Upload Photo
9/2/092/0049	5 Buitenkant Street, Swellendam	This predominantly Victorian dwelling-house, with its bay window at one end and veranda stretching on two sides of the building, was erected in 1900 by a local buildier named Karg.	Swellendam	Swellendam	Provincial Heritage Site	34°01′26″S 20°26′05″E	Upload Photo
9/2/092/0050	3 Moolman Street, Swellendam	This cottage originally formed part of a row of nineteenth century buildings situated in Moolman Street. Some of these structures have unfortunately been demolished. The cottage originally consisted of a single row of rooms with a flat-roofed addition to. This cottage in the vernacular style was reputedly one of a row of nineteenth century "tuishuisies" near the Dutch Reformed Church.	Swellendam	Swellendam	Provincial Heritage Site	34°01′33″S 20°25′53″E	Upload Photo
9/2/092/0051	Klein Drostdy, 12 Drostdy Street, Swellendam	Type of site: Drostdy. This dwelling-house with its Cape-Georgian characteristics, which date from the 1850s, forms an integral part of the historical core of Swellendam.	Swellendam	Swellendam	Provincial Heritage Site	34°01′15″S 20°27′07″E	Upload Photo
9/2/092/0052	Lismore, Swellendam District	The farm Lismore has been in the Barry family for five generations and the homestead has never been changed since it came into their possession. The homestead consists of a T-shaped house with two minor extensions on each end of the facade. The house is l. The core of this Cape Dutch homestead dates from the 1750s. Additions were made in the 1840s, after which it remained unaltered. Since then, Lismore has been in the possession of the Barry family for five generations.		Swellendam	Provincial Heritage Site	34°01′22″S 20°26′20″E	Upload Photo
9/2/092/0053	10 Hermanus Steyn Street, Swellendam	These four dwelling-houses with their Victoria characteristics all date from the nineteenth century or the first decade of the twentieth century and form an integral part of the historical and architectural core of Swellendam.	Swellendam	Swellendam	Provincial Heritage Site	34°01′09″S 20°27′03″E	Upload Photo
9/2/092/0054	204 Voortrek Street, Swellendam	The property on which this late-nineteenth-century dwelling-house is situated originally formed part of the old Boys' High School (now Olyfkrans College). The house forms an integral part of the architectural character of Voortrek Street in Swellendam.	Swellendam	Swellendam	Provincial Heritage Site	34°01′40″S 20°26′01″E	Upload Photo
9/2/092/0055	101 Voortrek Street, Swellendam	This nineteenth century dwelling, with its predominantly Victorian characteristics, forms an integral part of the architectural street scene of Voortrek Street and of the historic core of Swellendam.	Swellendam	Swellendam	Provincial Heritage Site	34°01′26″S 20°26′18″E	This nineteenth century dwelling, with its predominantly Victorian characteristics, forms an integral part of the architectural street scene of Voortrek Street and of the historic core of Swellendam.
9/2/092/0056	Malta, 9 Glen Barry Road, Swellendam		Swellendam	Swellendam	Provincial Heritage Site	34°00′44″S 20°26′58″E	Upload Photo
9/2/092/0057	St Luke's Church, 72 Voortrek Street, Swellendam	Building of considerable period character, now well restored. A landmark in Swellendam. Type of site: Church Current use: Church : Anglican.	Swellendam	Swellendam	Provincial Heritage Site	34°01′13″S 20°26′40″E	Building of considerable period character, now well restored. A landmark in Swellendam. Type of site: Church Current use: Church : Anglican.
9/2/092/0058	Osloo House, 120 Voortrek Street, Swellendam		Swellendam	Swellendam	Provincial Heritage Site	34°01′19″S 20°26′31″E	Upload Photo
9/2/092/0059	Die Kloof, Weltevreden Street, Swellendam		Swellendam	Swellendam	Provincial Heritage Site	34°00′57″S 20°26′33″E	Upload Photo
9/2/092/0060	Buffeljachtsrivier Bridge, Swellendam District	Type of site: Bridge Current use: Bridge.		Swellendam	Provincial Heritage Site	34°02′44″S 20°32′06″E	Upload Photo
9/2/092/0061	SUURBRAAK, SWELLENDAM DISTRICT, GENERAL		Suurbraak	Swellendam	National Monument		Upload Photo
9/2/092/0062	SWELLENDAM MAGISTERIAL DISTRICT, GENERAL		Swellendam	Swellendam			Upload Photo
9/2/092/0063	BONNIEVALE LOCAL AREA, GENERAL		Bonnievale	Swellendam			Upload Photo
9/2/092/0064	MALGAS LOCAL AREA, GENERAL		Malgas	Swellendam			Upload Photo
9/2/092/0065	BARRYDALE LOCAL AREA, GENERAL		Barrydale	Swellendam			Upload Photo
9/2/092/0066	Conservation Area, Suurbraak, Swellendam District		Suurbraak	Swellendam			Upload Photo
9/2/092/0067	Grier Bridge, Breede River, Swellendam District	Type of site: Bridge. For 150 years vehicular traffic crossed the Breede River at a pont. Near the site of the second pont the first bridge over the Breede river near Swellendam was built in the early 1890s. It is a triumph of Victorian engineering. Sections of the iron bri		Swellendam	Provincial Heritage Site	34°01′31″S 20°26′14″E	Upload Photo
