= Floorshoogte Pass =

Mountain pass in South Africa

Coordinates: 34°09′13.8″S 19°18′03.6″E

Floorshoogte Pass is a mountain pass situated in the Western Cape province of South Africa, on the Regional road R43 (Western Cape) between Bot River and Villiersdorp.
