= Burgers Pass =

Mountain pass in South Africa

Coordinates: 33°41′28.0″S 19°55′12.1″E

Burgers Pass, also known as Koo Pass, is situated in the Western Cape province of South Africa, on the Regional road R318 between Montagu and Touws River.
