= Gysmanshoek Pass =

Mountain pass in Western Cape, South Africa

Coordinates: 33°56′28″S 21°3′10″E

Gysmanshoek Pass, historically also known as Plattekloof and Hudson's Pass, is a mountain pass] situated in the Western Cape, province of South Africa between Heidelberg Wc and Warmwaterberg. This is a pass that bisects a private property. It can be traversed only on foot.

The pass was first opened by trekboers in the 18th century. It fell into disuse after more direct roads through the Tradouw and Garcia's passes were developed in the 1870s.

- Road skill level: Intermediate
- Road condition: Gravel surface
