= Garcia's Pass =

Mountain pass in Western Cape, South Africa

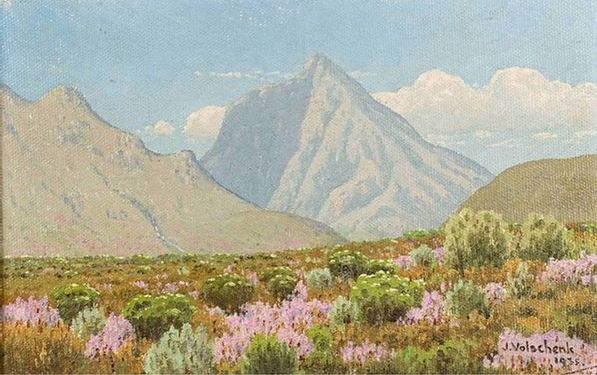
- Along the Langeberg near Garcia's Pass, painting by Jan Ernst Abraham Volschenk

- Location within Western Cape
- Elevation: 548 metres (1,798 ft)
- Traversed by: R323

Third Approach
- Location: Western Cape, South Africa
- Range: Langeberg
- Coordinates: 33°56′26″S 21°13′21″E

The Garcia's Pass is a mountain pass across the Langeberg in the Western Cape province of South Africa, with its highest point at 548 m (1,798 ft) altitude. The regional road numbered R323 uses this pass on its leg between Riversdale in the south and Ladismith in the Little Karoo to the north. From Riversdale, the road winds to the Garcia Pass across the Langeberg to Muiskraal in the northern foothills. The maximum slope is 1:14 on the southern descend.

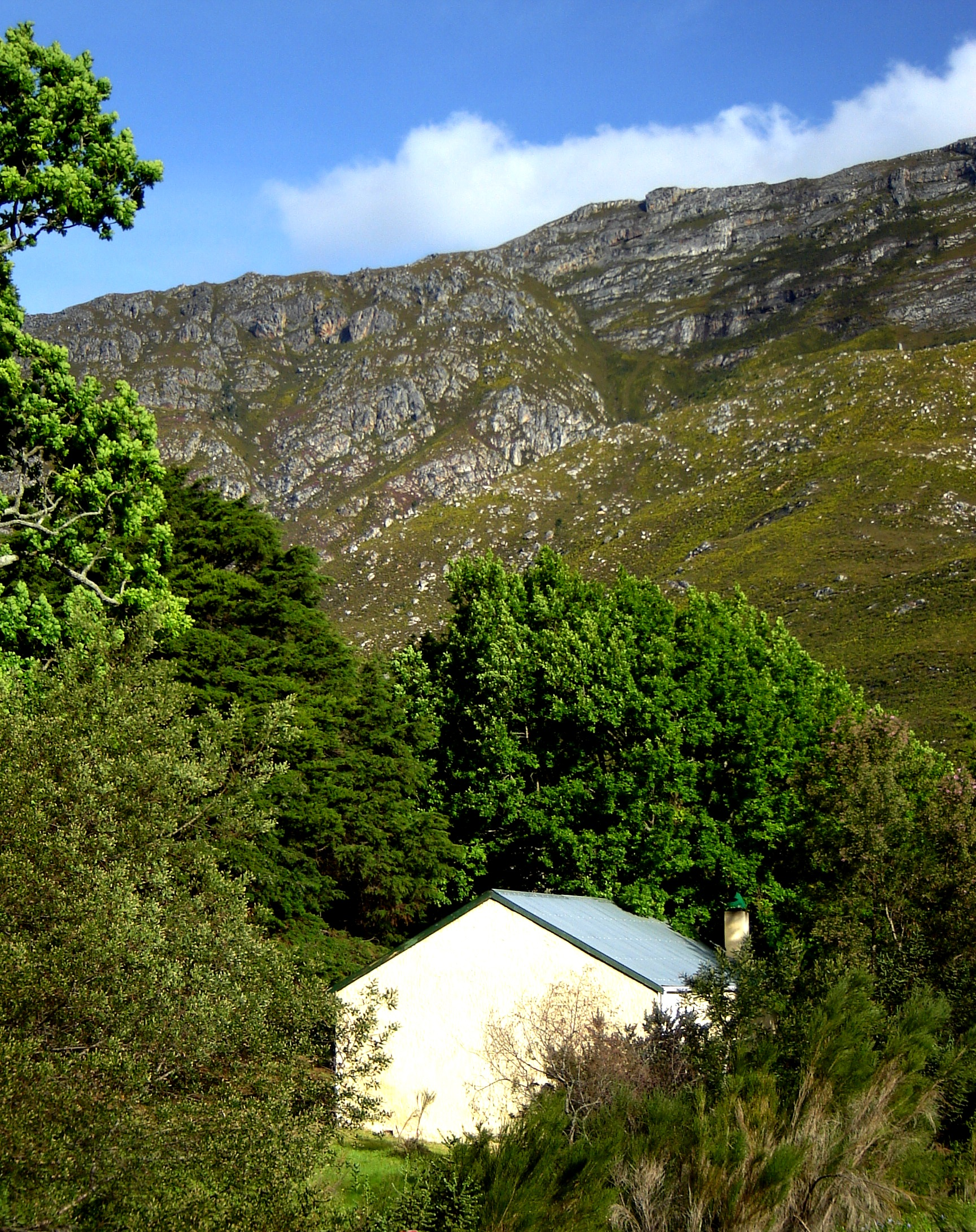
Toll house

The pass was named in honor of Maurice Garcia, the commissioner of Riversdale between 1863 and 1877. He quickly came to see that a road between the recently established town of Ladismith and the coast would be of great benefit to the farmers of the Little Karoo to enable their produce to be shipped from the harbor at Mossel Bay. From horseback, Garcia himself laid out a route that is much shorter than the earlier route over the Gysmanshoek Pass. By the year 1868 his bridle path was already used by riders. In 1871, Thomas Bain upgraded the pass to enable transport by carts. Prison labor was used to construct the 16 km (9.9 mi) tracks, while the workers were housed in a temporary jail on site. The Cape Colony's Prime Minister, Sir John Gordon Sprigg officially opened the pass in November 1879. A toll house was constructed along the pass. Jimmy Luyt was the first tax collector, and after his death, his wife and Jan Swart continued this job. Nationwide, the levying of tolls stopped in 1918. The toll house was given the status of monument in 1968, one of several provincial heritages sites near Riversdale. The Kristalkloof and the Sleeping Beauty footpaths both start from the site of the toll house. The pass was reconstructed in 1976, when the road got an asphalt covering. The nearby town of Garcia is situated at the southern entrance of the mountain pass, as well as named after it.

== See also ==
- List of mountain passes of the Western Cape
