= R320 (South Africa) =

Regional route in South Africa

Regional route R320
- R320 route map

Major junctions
- North end: R43
- South end: R316

Location
- Country: South Africa

Highway system
- Numbered routes of South Africa
← R319	→ R321

The R320 is a Regional Route in South Africa that connects Onrusrivier near Hermanus with Caledon.

Its southern origin is the R43 at Onrusrivier, between Hawston and Hermanus. It heads north-east through Shaw's Mountain Pass to end at the R316 at Caledon.
