= Middelberg Pass =

Mountain pass of the Western Cape

Coordinates: 32.6280°S 19.1421°E

Middelberg Pass is situated in the Eastern Cape, province of South Africa on the Regional road R303, between Citrusdal and Ceres. It is part of a group of passes on the R303 between the Cederberg and Groot Winterhoek mountains, with Buffelshoek Pass to the south, and Elandskloof pass to the north.
