= Hex River Poort Pass =

Coordinates: 33°33′04.3″S 19°31′17.5″E

Hex River Poort Pass is a mountain pass situated in the Western Cape, province of South Africa on the N1 national road between Worcester and De Doorns.

== See also ==
- Hex River Mountains
- Hex River Tunnels
