= R327 (South Africa) =

Regional route in South Africa

Regional route R327
- R327 route map

Route information
- Length: 141 km (88 mi)

Major junctions
- North end: R62 near Ladismith
- South end: N2 near Mossel Bay

Location
- Country: South Africa

Highway system
- Numbered routes of South Africa
← R326	→ R328

The R327 is a Regional Route in South Africa. Its a regional route in the Western Cape and connects Mossel Bay to Ladismith and part of the northern route is a gravel road.

== Route ==
Its northern origin is from the R62 near Ladismith. From there it winds generally south-east. It goes over Cloete's Pass before reaching Herbertsdale. On the other side of the town it crosses the Du Plessis Pass. It then reaches its south-eastern terminus at the N2 near Mossel Bay.
