= Swartberg Pass =

Mountain pass in Western Cape, South Africa

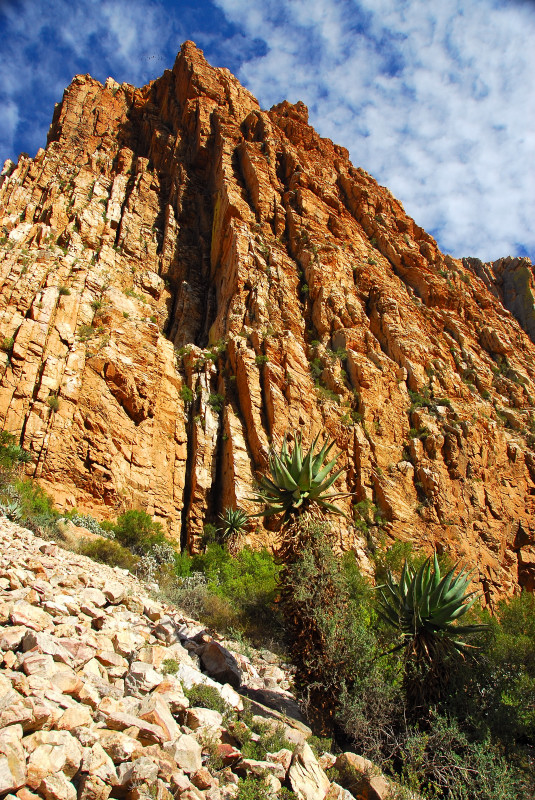
Wall of Fire, Swartberg Pass

The Swartberg Pass on the R328 runs over the Swartberg mountain range (black mountain in English) which runs roughly east–west along the northern edge of the semi-arid area called the Little Karoo in the Western Cape province of South Africa. It's the only road access to Gamkaskloof.

== History ==
The construction of the Swartberg pass was started under the guidance of Jan Tassies who used 100 workers from Mozambique. After 13 months he went bankrupt and also only completed 6 km of the road! The rest of the pass was built between 1883 and 1888 by Thomas Bain, son of the famous Andrew Geddes Bain who built Bain's Kloof Pass and many more. It followed their earlier construction of another pass in 1858, the Meiringspoort, through the same mountains but further east.

It was built using convict labour, and opened on 10 January 1888. The dry-stone retaining walls, supporting some of its hairpin bends, are still in place and over 130 years old.

== Geography ==
To the north of the range lies the other large semi-arid area in South Africa, the Great Karoo. Much of the Swartberg is part of a UNESCO World Heritage Site.

The pass runs between Oudtshoorn in the south and Prince Albert in the north. The pass is not tarred and can be a little treacherous after rain, but has views over the Little Karoo to the south and the Great Karoo to the north. The plant life along the pass is very interesting, many hundreds of species being found on the Swartberg.

The top of the pass is at 33°21′8″S 22°2′46″E.

== Geology ==
The Swartberg mountains are amongst the best exposed fold mountain chains in the world, and the pass slices through magnificently scenic geological formations. The contortions in the rock display astonishing anticlines and synclines, and the vivid coloration of the surrounding Quartzite is remarkable.

The pass is especially known for the unusual geology that is exposed at its Northern end. Here, seven-hundred-metre-high quartzite cliffs of the upper Table Mountain Group can be seen, and these are often tilted through 90 degrees (sometimes even more). Arguably the most famous of all these cliff faces is the spectacular 'Wall of Fire'.

== Gallery ==
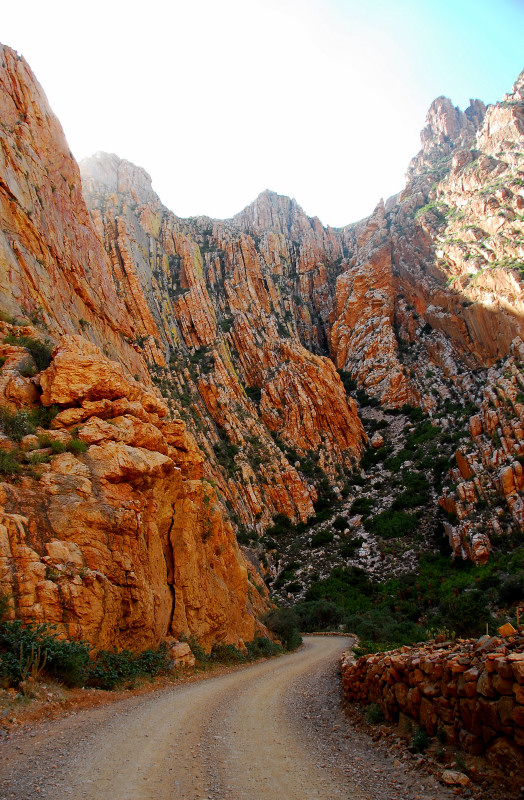
Swartberg Pass

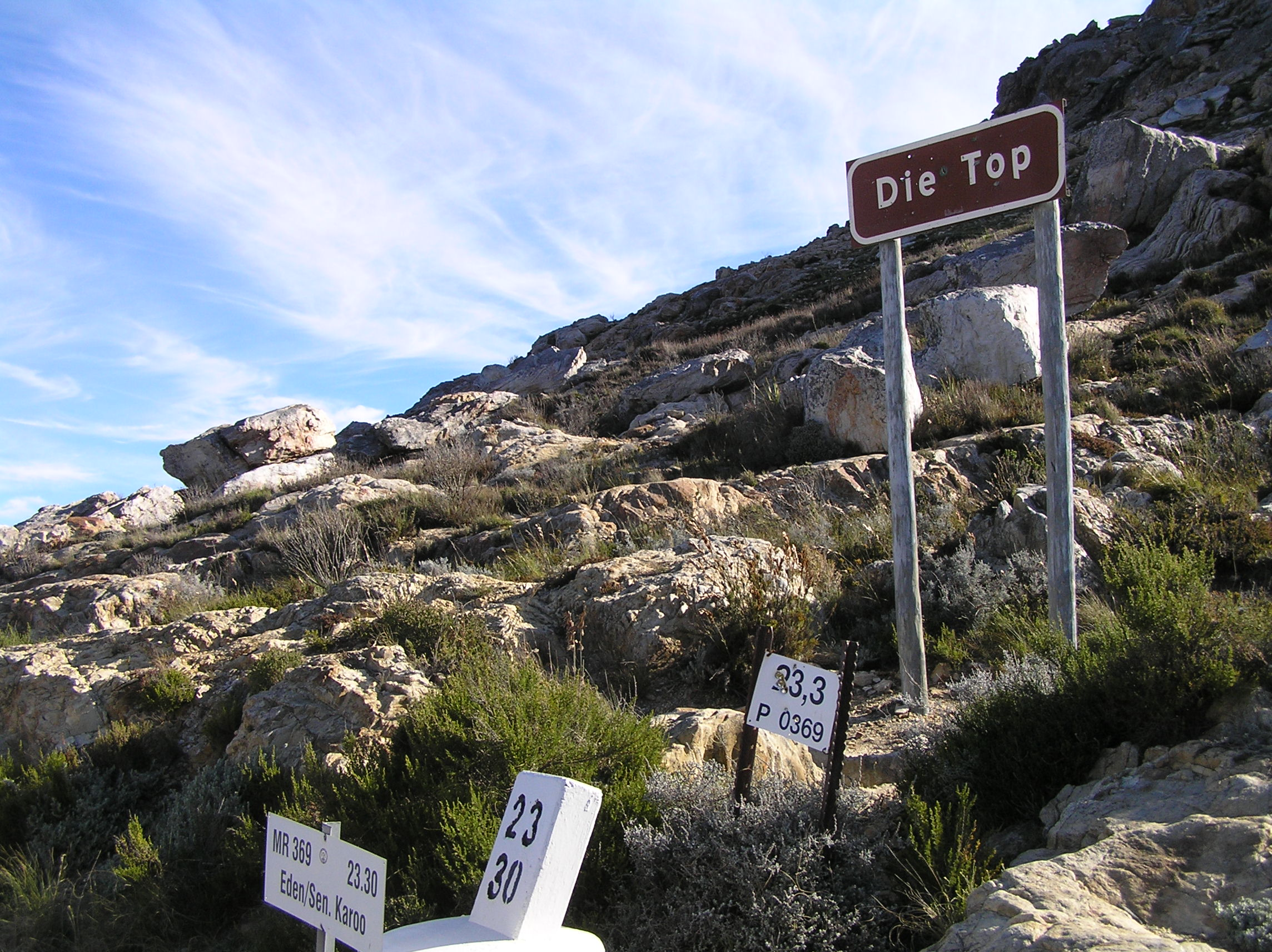
Top the Swartberg Pass

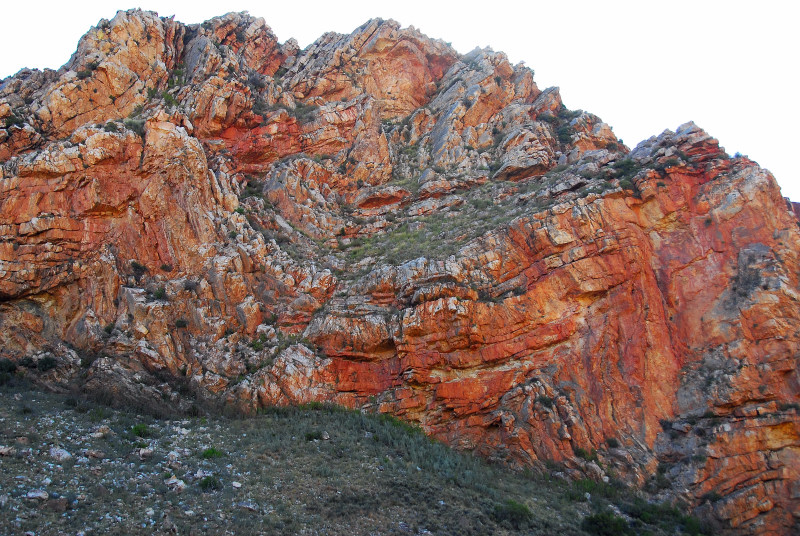
Swartberg Pass Rock Formation

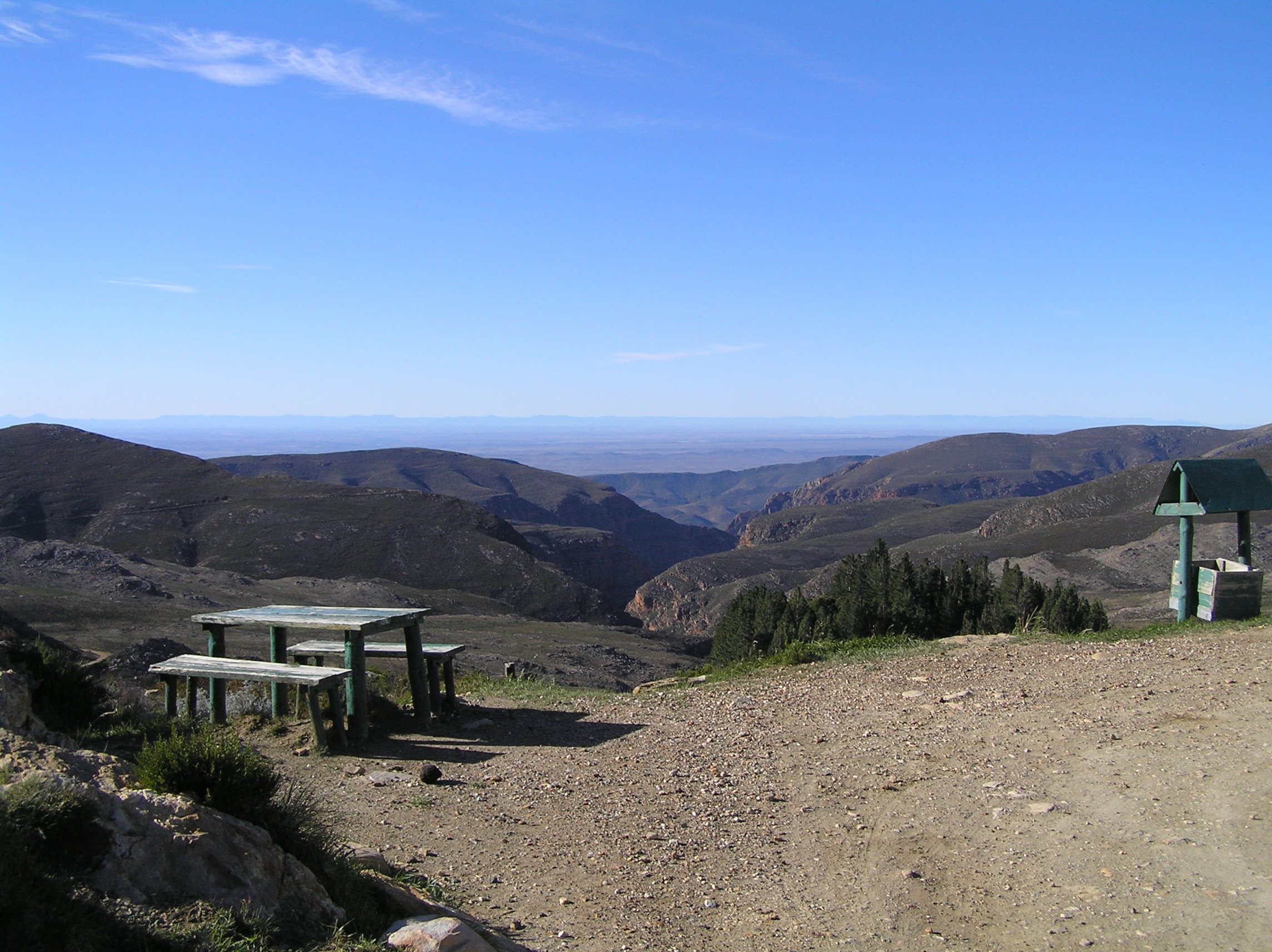
View North from the Top of the Pass

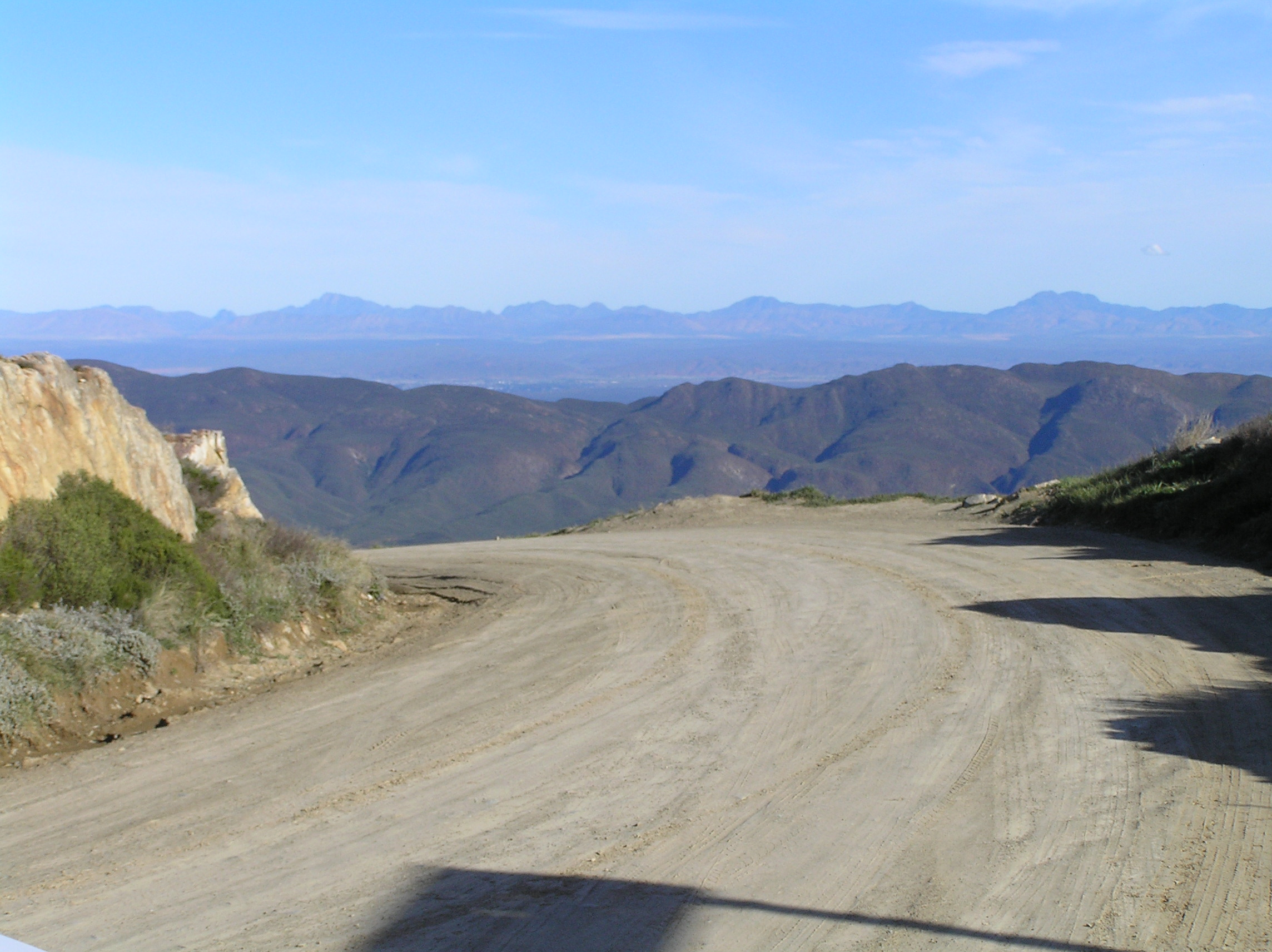
View South from the Top of the Pass

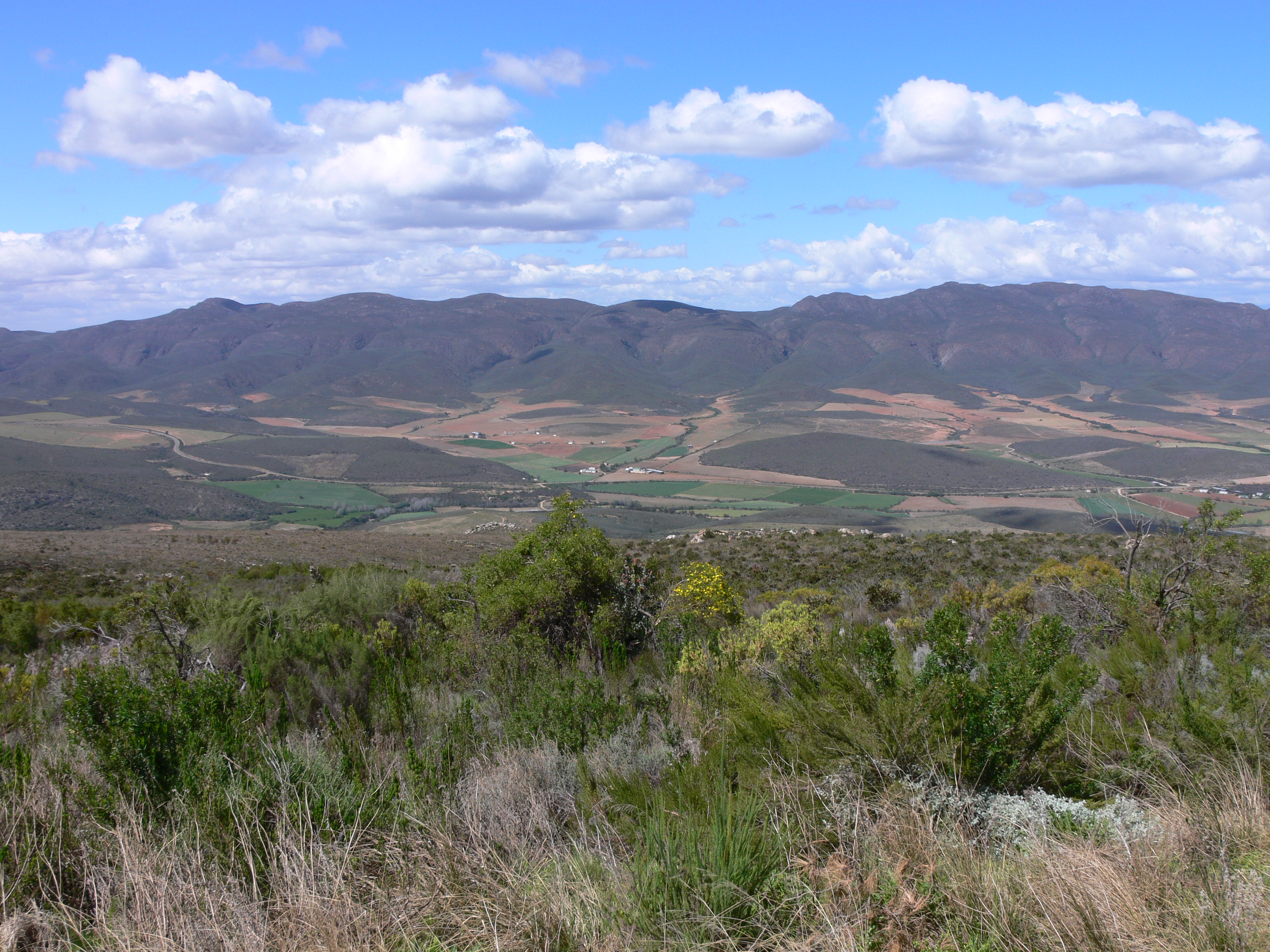
The Swartberg Mountains

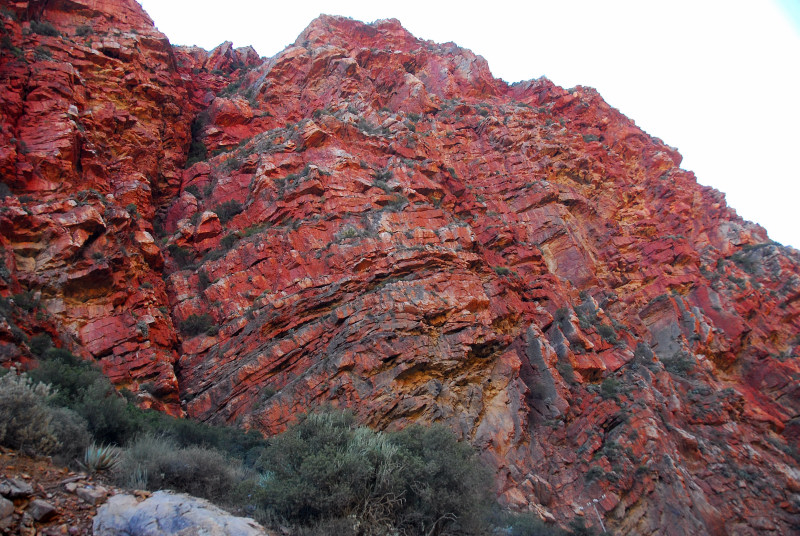
Swartberg Pass
