= Herbertsdale =

- Location within Western Cape Location within South Africa
- Coordinates: 34°01′S 21°46′E
- Country: South Africa
- Province: Western Cape
- District: Garden Route
- Municipality: Mossel Bay

Area
  - Total: 2.87 km^{2} (1.11 sq mi)

Population (2011)
  - Total: 666
  - Density: 232/km^{2} (601/sq mi)

Racial makeup (2011)
  - Black African: 8.3%
  - Coloured: 77.0%
  - Indian/Asian: 1.2%
  - White: 12.6%
  - Other: 0.9%

First languages (2011)
  - Afrikaans: 95.9%
  - English: 2.3%
  - Other: 1.9%
- Time zone: UTC+2 (SAST)
- PO box: 6505
- Area code: 044

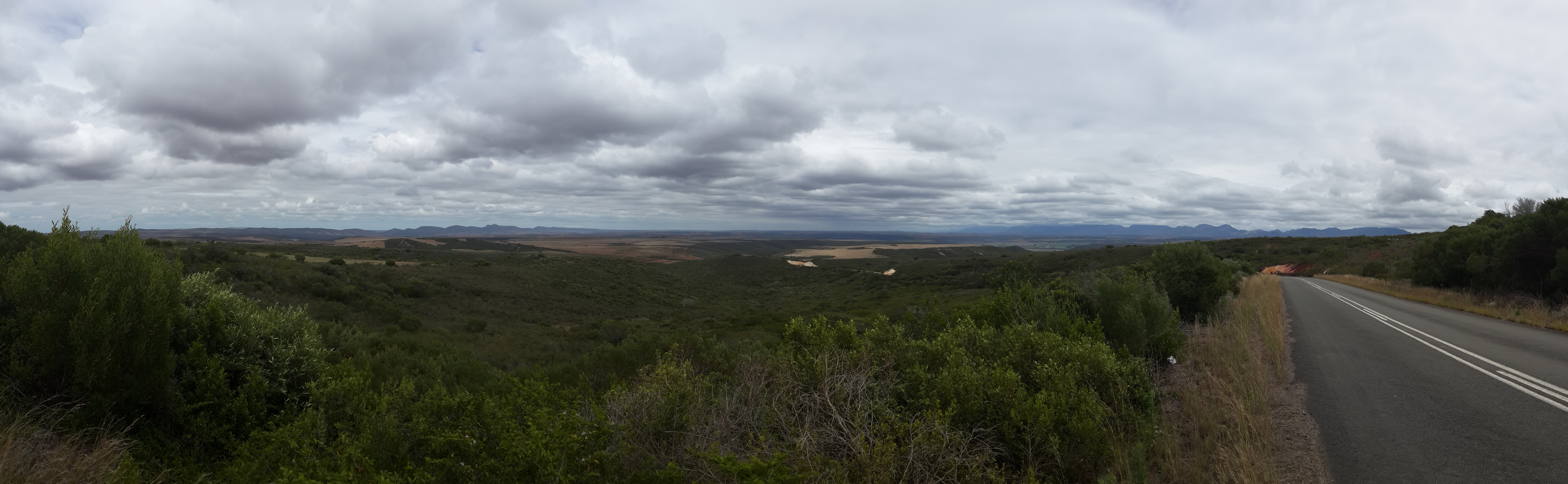
The route to Herbertsdale

Herbertsdale is a settlement in Garden Route District Municipality in the Western Cape province of South Africa.

Village east of the Gourits River, in the Langtou Valley, 56 km north-west of Mossel Bay. It was established in 1865 on the farm Hemelrood and named after James Benton Herbert, who owned part of this farm.
