= R365 (South Africa) =

Regional route in South Africa

Regional route R365
- R365 route map

Route information
- Length: 124 km (77 mi)

Major junctions
- North end: R364 in Lamberts Bay
- R366; R44 in Piketberg
- South end: N7 in Piketberg

Location
- Country: South Africa
- Towns: Eendekuil; Lamberts Bay; Leipoldtville; Piketberg

Highway system
- Numbered routes of South Africa
← R364	→ R366

The R365 is a Regional Route in South Africa that connects Piketberg and Lamberts Bay.

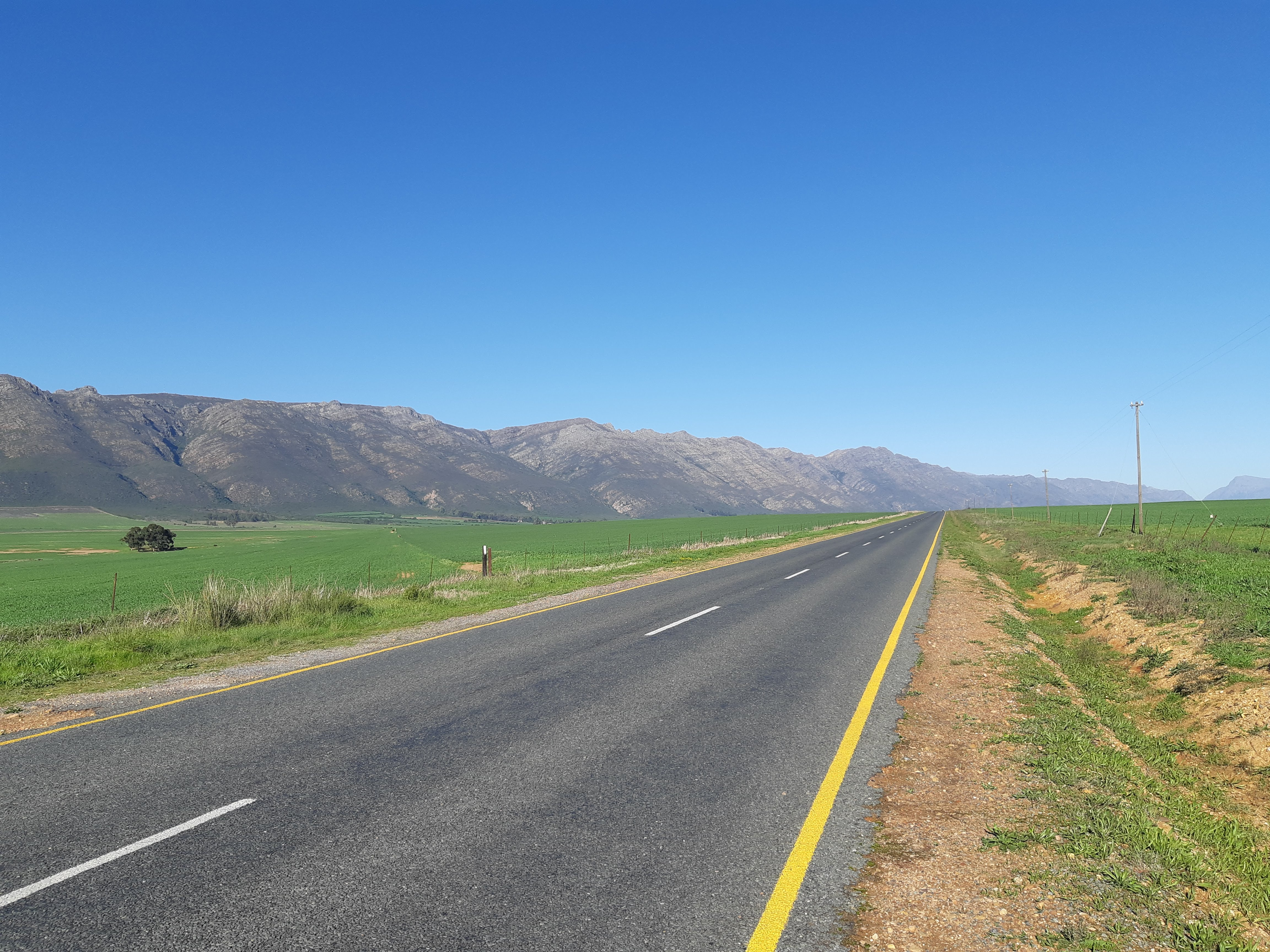
The R365 just north of Porterville.

== Route ==
Its north-western terminus is at the R364 in Lamberts Bay. From there it heads south then east for 29 kilometres to reach Leipoldtville. It continues for a further 57 kilometres in a south-easterly to south-south-easterly direction before crossing the Kruismans River and meeting the R366 at a T-junction from the south. Here, turning right, the westerly route is signed as the R366 to Elands Bay. The R365 turns left here, continuing east before veering south. After 13 kilometres, a turnoff to the left is given to Eendekuil. Continuing south, it ends at a four-way junction with the R44 at Piketberg. The R365 enters from the north, with the south and west roads unsigned. The easterly road is the westerly terminus of the R44.

The turnoff to the Dasklip Pass is located along the R365 just outside of Porterville.
