= 2015 Western Cape fire season =

Series of wildfires in South Africa

- An aerial view of 2015 fires on the hills above Muizenberg.
- Date: February 2015 - April 2015; (SAST)
- Location: Western Cape, South Africa

Statistics
- Burned area: Over 11,800 hectares (46 mi^{2}; 29,000 acres; 118 km^{2})
- Land use: Agriculture

Impacts
- Deaths: 4
- Injuries: 56
- Structures destroyed: 13
- Cost: >R11 million (ZAR, 2015)

Ignition
- Cause: Arson, lightning

The 2015 Cape wildfires were a series of wildfires that burned across the Western Cape from February to April 2015. Major fires burned across the Cape Peninsula starting on 1 March in Muizenberg and burning until 9 March, when firefighters extinguished it. The fire resulted in 1 death, 56 injuries, over 6,900 hectares (17,000 acres) of burnt land, and 13 damaged properties, of which 3 were destroyed. The cause of the fire was later determined to be arson. There were also major fires near Wellington and Porteville starting in February, which claimed the lives of 3 firefighters and a fire in Stellenbosch that caused the evacuation of the University of Stellenbosch and burned over 2,900 hectares (7,200 acres) of land.

== Major fires ==
=== Cape Peninsula ===
==== Muizenberg ====
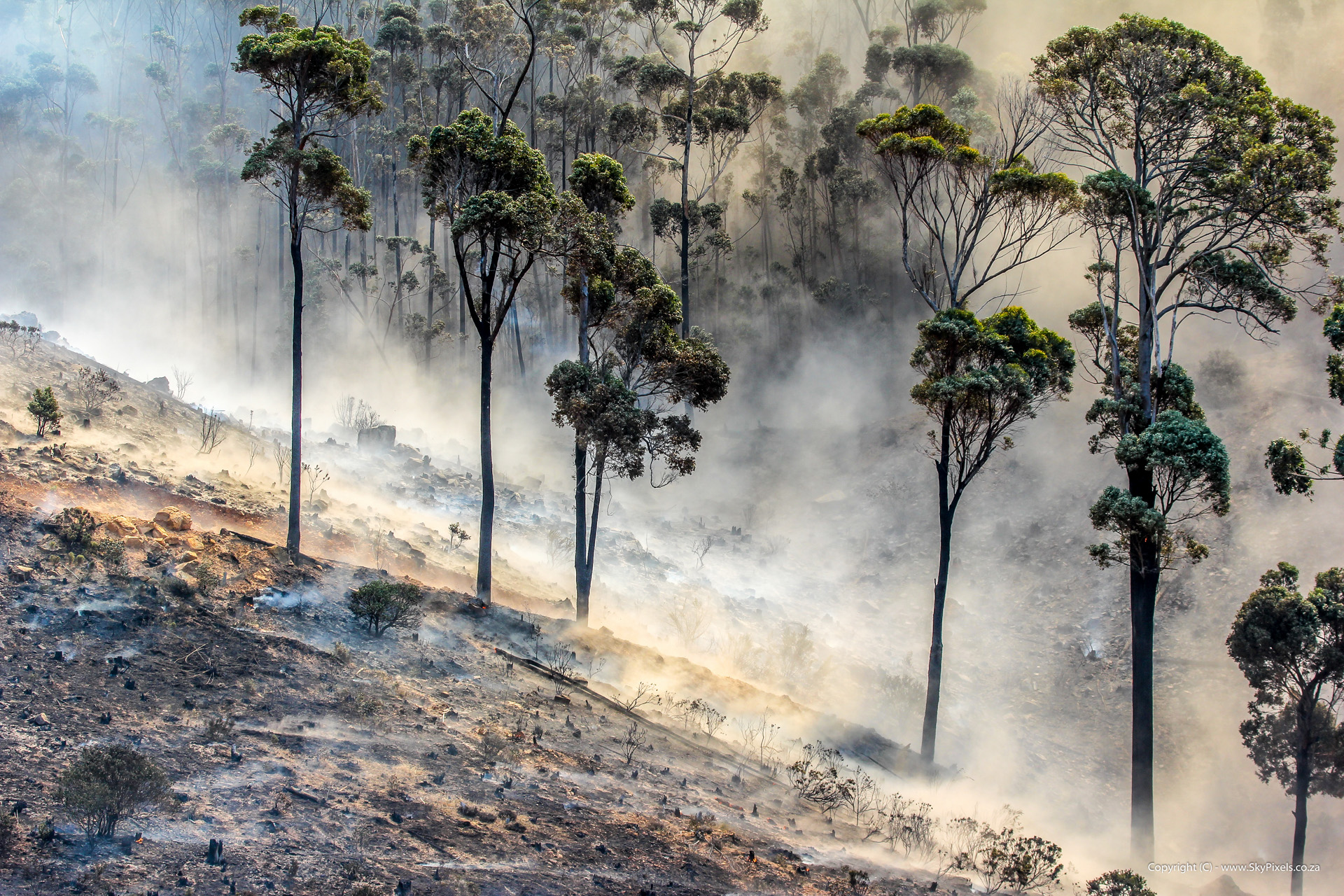
Imitate aftermath of the fires on the hills of Muizenberg overlooking Cape Town.

The Muizenberg fire ignited in the afternoon on 1 March. The fire burned through the night and was brought under control until 2 a.m. the next morning, when it flared up again. By noon, 52 people had been treated for smoke inhalation, a firefighter had been treated for burn wounds and 2 bungalows and 5 homes had been destroyed. A number of buildings were evacuated, including 10 homes, a retirement village in Muizenberg and an old-age home in Noordhoek. The fire was being fought by a spotter plane, 2 fixed-wing water bombers, 4 helicopters, 18 support vehicles, 28 firefighting vehicles, 50 Working on Fire ground crew and 97 city firefighters. Chapman's Peak Drive and parts of Ou Kaapse Weg had been closed due to the fire. Damage to these roads lead to the Cape Town Cycle Tour being shortened to avoid them. The fire was reportedly being fueled by strong winds and burning towards. A South African Navy base was under risk of burning. By the third day of the Muizenberg fire, flames had spread to Noordhoek, Lakeside and Hout Bay.

==== Hout Bay ====
The Hout Bay fire spread from the Muizenberg fire by 3 March and burned for 3 days. The fire was fought by members of the National Sea Rescue Institute, 8 Working on Fire volunteers and 15 SANParks firefighters, firefighting helicopters, and residents and staff of the Tierboskloof suburb. A number of firefighters were transported up the mountains by helicopter to extinguish flames that were inaccessible by foot. The fire was brought under control on 6 March by 3 a.m. and heat sensing equipment was used to find any hot areas that could flare up again.

==== Cape Point ====
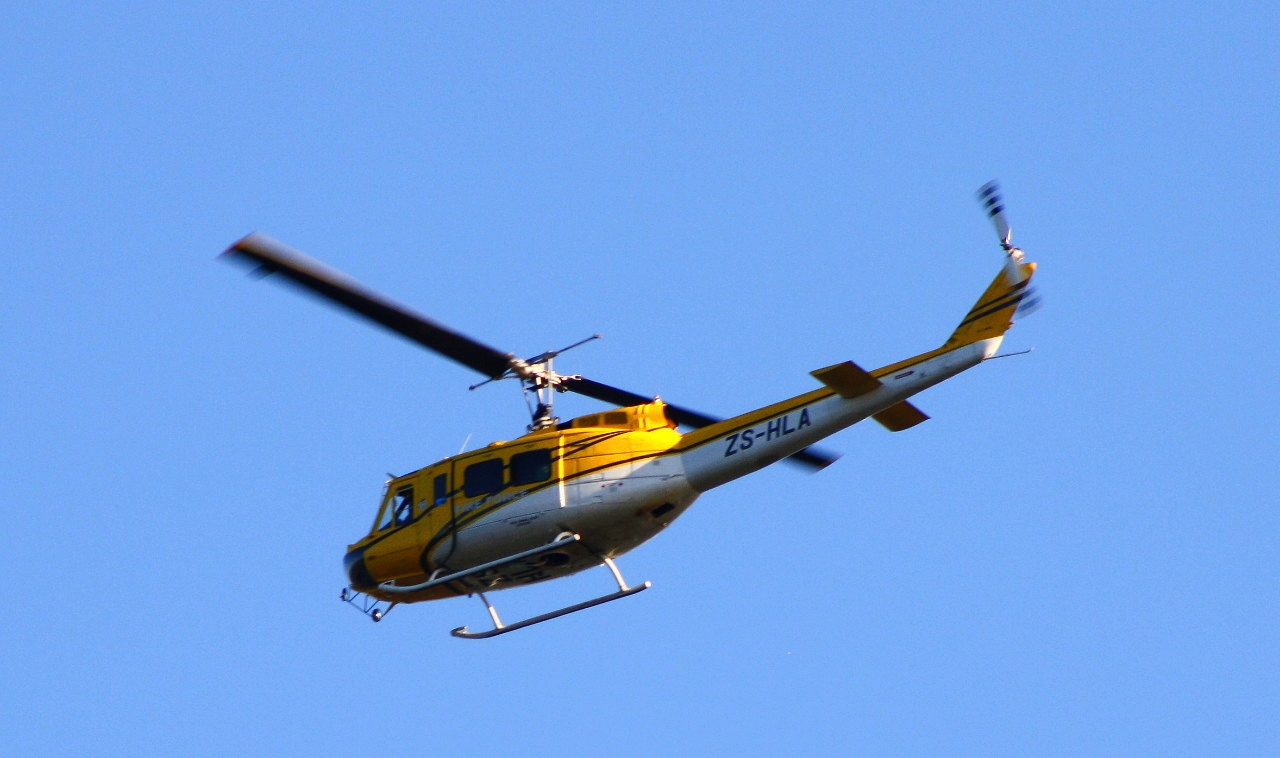
A Working on Fire Huey

The Cape Point fire started on Wednesday, 4 March in Cape Point Nature Reserve after a lightning strike in the area. Firefighters managed to bring the fire under control, but strong winds fueled the fire and made it difficult for aerial firefighting resources to be used and the fire flared up again on Thursday. On Saturday, 71-year-old firefighting helicopter pilot, Hendrik Willem Marais, was killed when his Bell Huey helicopter crashed while fighting the fire. Mayor of Cape Town, Patricia de Lille and Minister of Environmental Affairs and Tourism, Edna Molewa sent their condolences. The fire in Cape Point flared up again on Sunday and 70-80 firefighters with water tanks were sent to control the fire.

==== Tokai ====
The Cape Peninsula fires had spread to Tokai by 4 March. The SANParks offices in Tokai Forest were evacuated. Groot Constantia, the oldest wine estate in South Africa suffered vineyard damage and had to be evacuated. Due to the historical value of the farm and its antiques, Iziko Museums sent a team to retrieve items of historic value from Groot Constantia Manor House.

=== Other major fires ===
==== Porterville ====
By 25 February, fires in the Winterhoek Mountains had burnt over 2,000 hectares (4,900 acres) of vegetation. 60 firefighters, 3 helicopters and 2 fixed-wing aircraft were deployed to fight the fire. On 6 March, A firefighter, Nazeem Davies was killed when his fire truck overturned and fell off the Dasklip Pass. He was returning from fighting fires on the mountains near Porterville.

==== Stellenbosch ====
On 9 March, a fire ignited in the Jonkershoek Nature Reserve near Stellenbosch. Three helicopters were deployed to fight the fire. By the next day, over 700 hectares (1,700 acres) of vegetation had been burnt. On 11 March, the University of Stellenbosch's Sport Performance Institute in Coetzenburg was evacuated and 2,900 hectares (7,200 acres) of land had been burnt.

==== Wellington ====
On 21 April, a fire broke out on a hiking trail on Bainskloof near Wellington. Close to 200 firefighters were deployed to fight the fire. On 23 April a firefighting Huey helicopter crash killed the pilot, Darrel Rea and safety officer, Jastun Visagie while they were fighting the Bainskloof fires.

== Responses ==
In the days following the start of the fire, the number of complaints received by Cape Town's line for reporting drivers who discard cigarette butts onto the road jumped from an average of 7 complaints per day to an average of 88 complaints per day. Fire stations also received donations of food and drinks for the firefighters who were fighting the fires.
