= R369 (South Africa) =

Regional route in South Africa

Regional route R369
- R369 route map

Route information
- Length: 277 km (172 mi)

Major junctions
- West end: R357 near Prieska
- R387 near Prieska; N12 at Hopetown; R387 near Orania; R48 near Vanderkloof; R48 at Petrusville
- East end: N1 / R58 / R717 in Colesberg

Location
- Country: South Africa

Highway system
- Numbered routes of South Africa
← R366	→ R370

The R369 is a Regional Route in South Africa that connects the R357 near Prieska with Colesberg via Hopetown.

== Route ==
The R369 begins at a junction with the R357 about 35 kilometres east of Prieska. It begins by going eastwards and after about 15 kilometres, it meets the western terminus of the R387. It then continues east for about 90 kilometres to meet the N12 at a staggered intersection in Hopetown. It continues south-east, following the Orange River, to the town of Orania, before again intersecting with the R387, this time at its eastern terminus. The route continues south-east and becomes co-signed with the R48 southwards for 19 kilometres. While co-signed with the R48, it bypasses Vanderkloof to the west and passes through Petrusville. Leaving the R48 south of Petrusvile, the route heads south-south-east to end near Colesberg at an interchange with the N1, the R717 and the R58.
