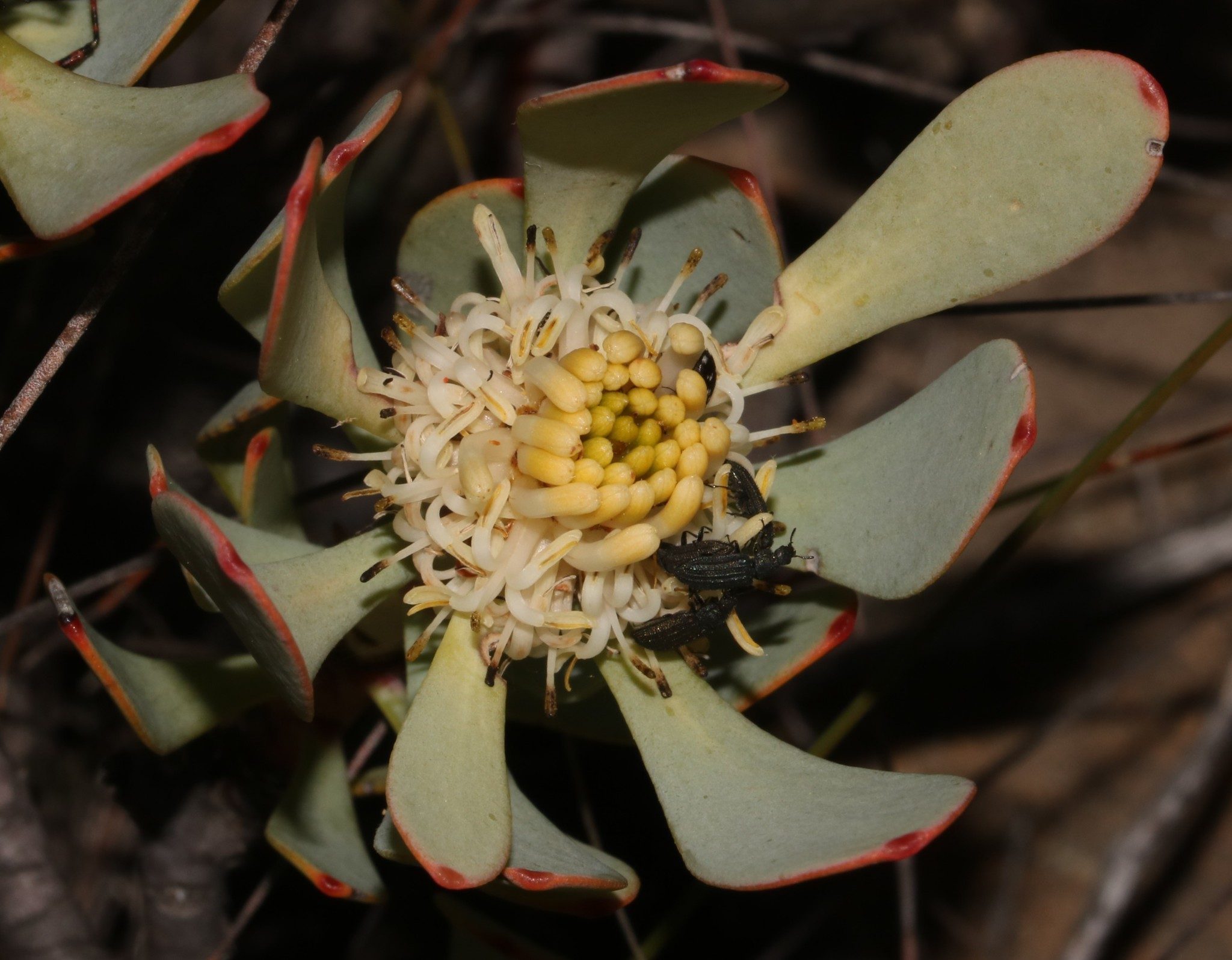

Conservation status
- Least Concern (IUCN 3.1)

Scientific classification
- Kingdom: Plantae
- Clade: Tracheophytes
- Clade: Angiosperms
- Clade: Eudicots
- Order: Proteales
- Family: Proteaceae
- Genus: Leucadendron
- Species: L. arcuatum

Binomial name
- Leucadendron arcuatum (Lam.) I.Williams

= Leucadendron arcuatum =

Species of plant

Leucadendron arcuatum, the red-edge conebush, is a flower-bearing shrub that belongs to the genus Leucadendron and forms part of the fynbos. The plant is native to the Western Cape, South Africa.

== Description ==
The shrub grows 1.3 m (4.3 ft) tall and bears flowers from September to October.

In Afrikaans, it is known as the Kruiptolbos.

== Distribution and habitat ==
The plant occurs in Cederberg, Olifants River, Kouebokkeveld Mountains, Groot Winterhoek, Elandskloof, Hexrivierberge, Keeromsberg, and Kwadouwberge.

== Gallery ==
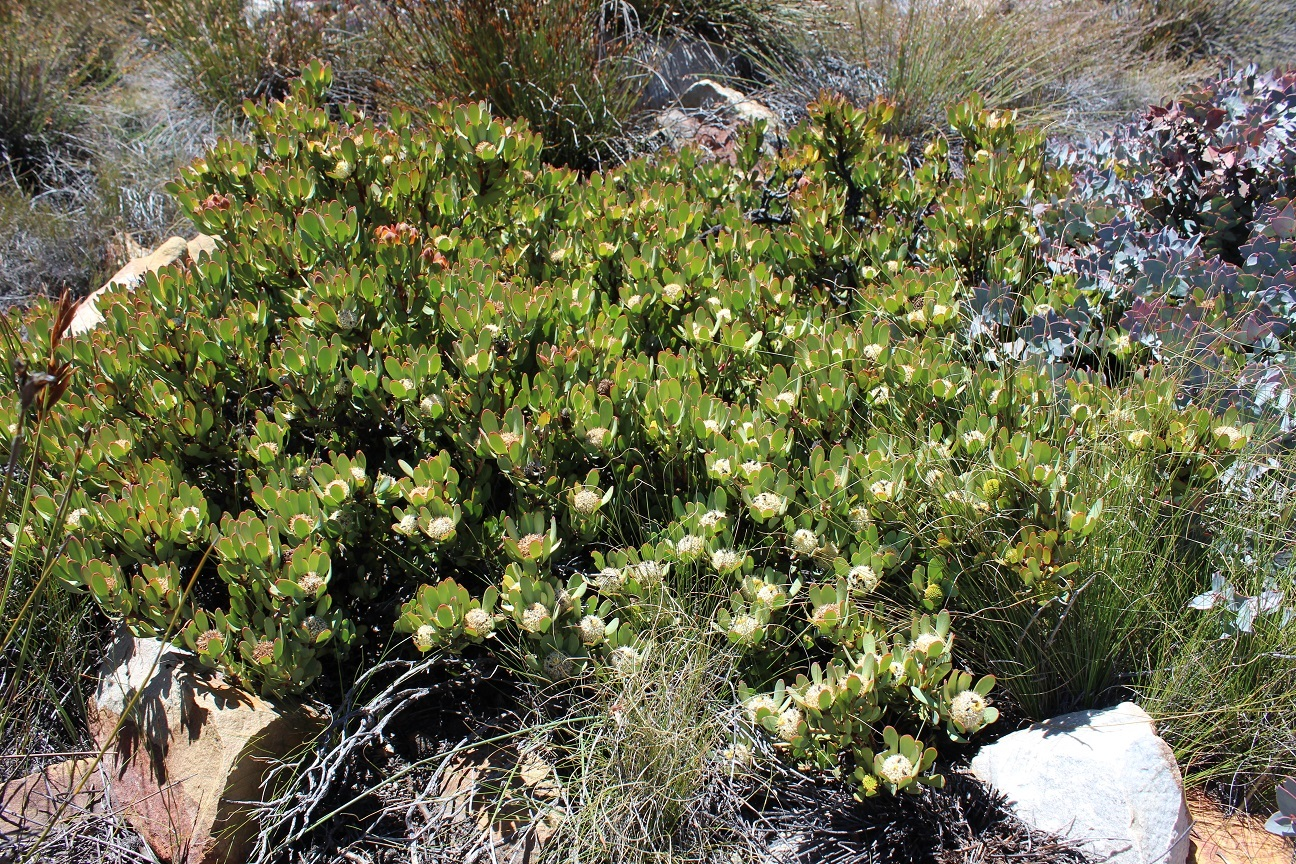

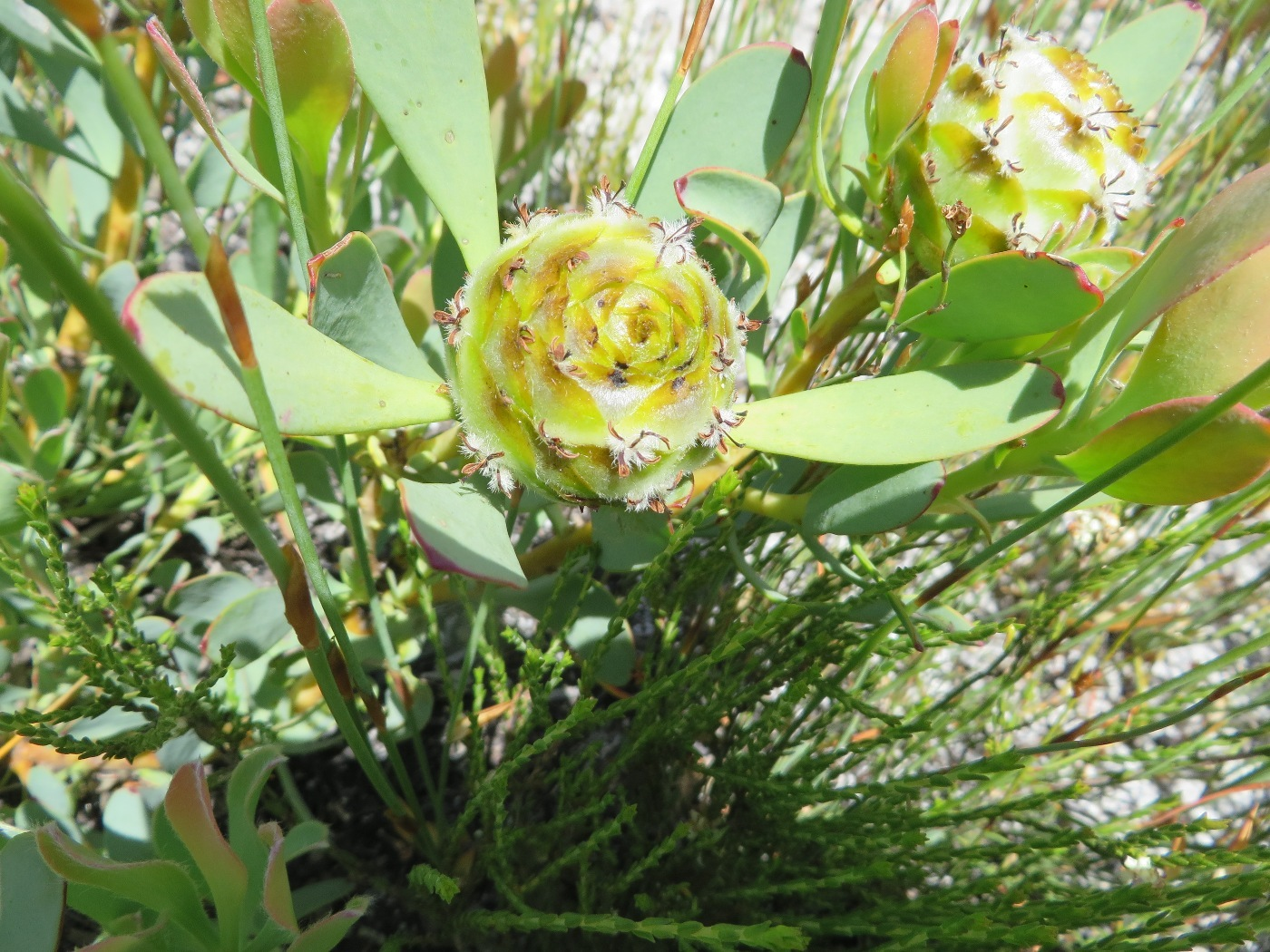

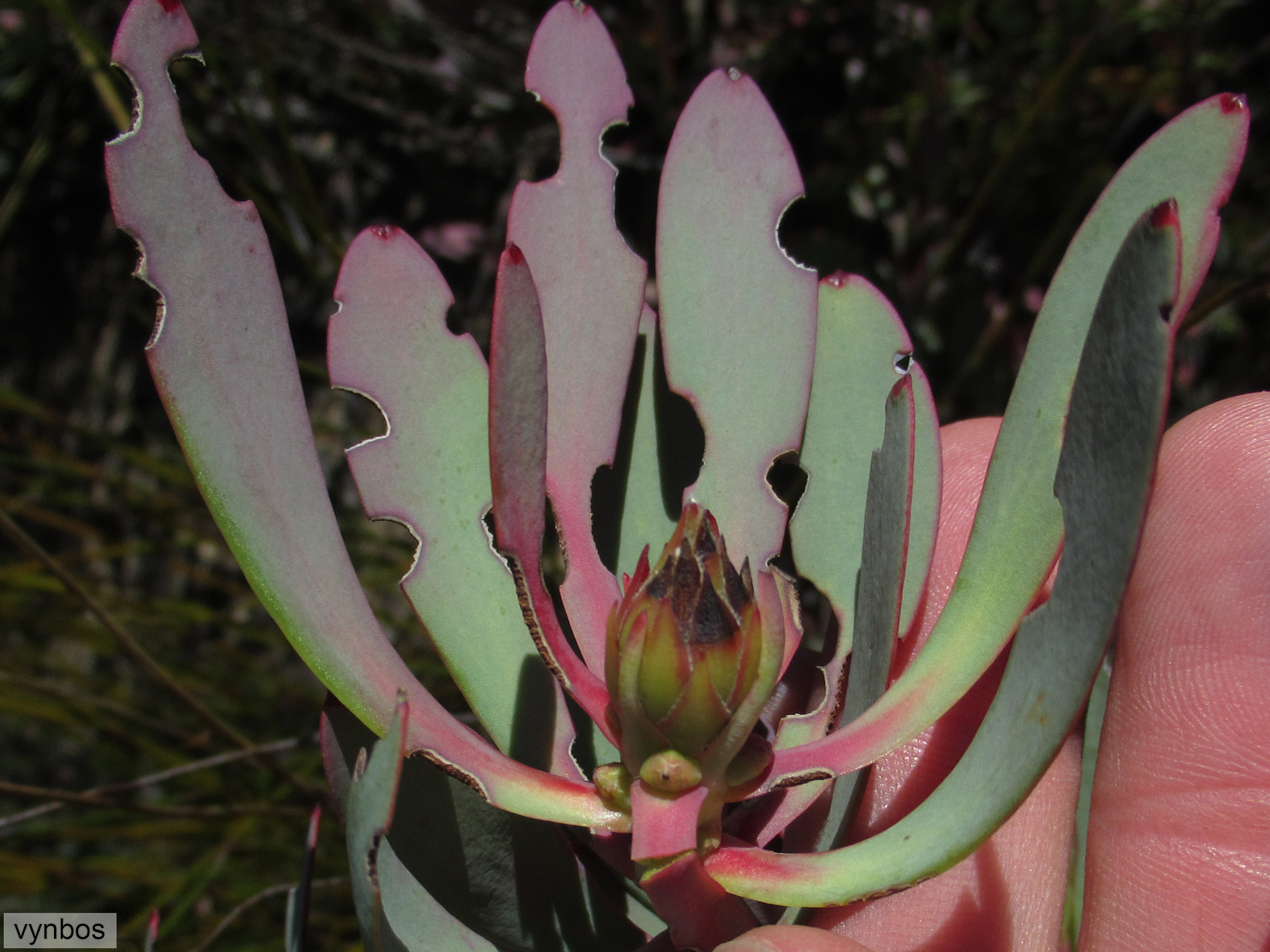

== Sources ==
- Threatened Species Programme | SANBI Red List of South African Plants
- Red-edged Conebush
