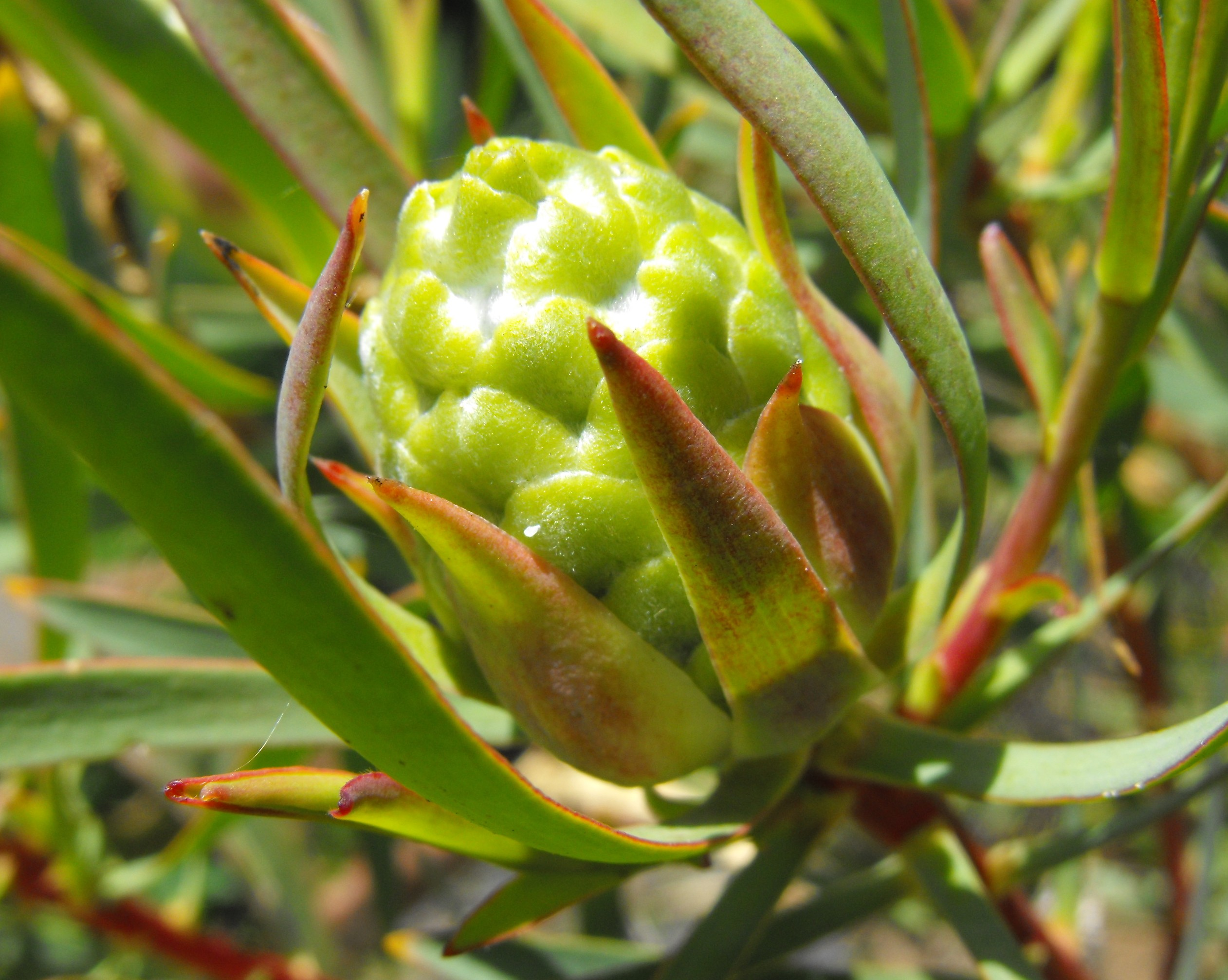

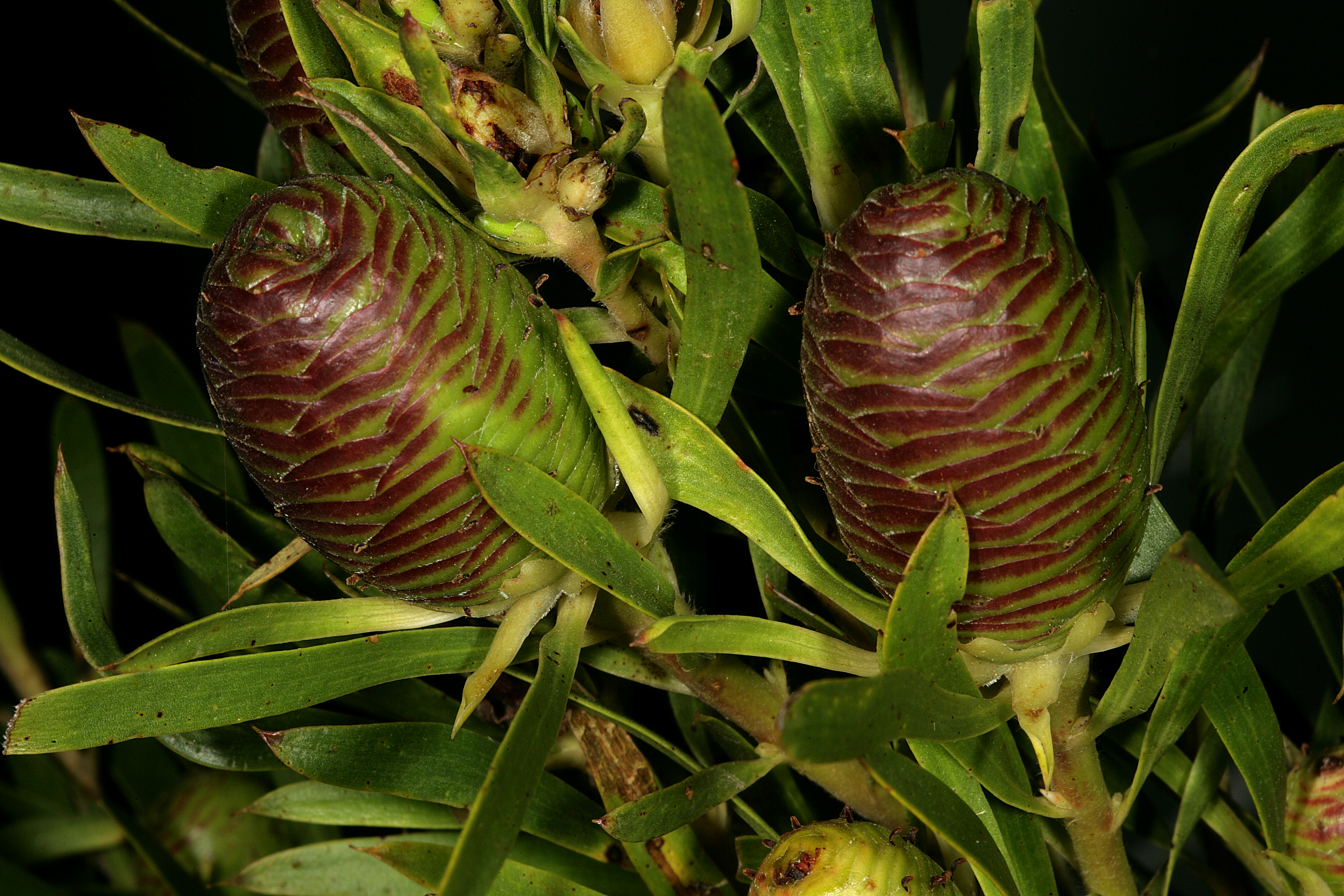

Conservation status
- Least Concern (IUCN 3.1).

Scientific classification
- Kingdom: Plantae
- Clade: Tracheophytes
- Clade: Angiosperms
- Clade: Eudicots
- Order: Proteales
- Family: Proteaceae
- Genus: Leucadendron
- Species: L. salicifolium

Binomial name
- Leucadendron salicifolium (Salisb.) I.Williams

= Leucadendron salicifolium =

Species of plant

Leucadendron salicifolium, the common stream conebush, is a flower-bearing shrub belonging to the genus Leucadendron and forms part of the fynbos. The plant is native to the Western Cape where it occurs from Porterville to Kogelberg and Langeberg.

== Description ==
The shrub grows 3 m (9.8 ft) tall and flowers from July to September. The plant dies after a fire but the seeds survive. The seeds are stored in a toll on the female plant and only fall to the ground after a fire and are possibly spread by the wind. The plant is unisexual and there are separate plants with male and female flowers, which are pollinated by the wind.

== Distribution and habitat ==
The plant grows mainly in rivers and seepage water at altitudes of 0–1,000 m (0–3,281 ft). In English, it is known as the common stream conebush. The tree's national number is 82.1.

== Gallery ==
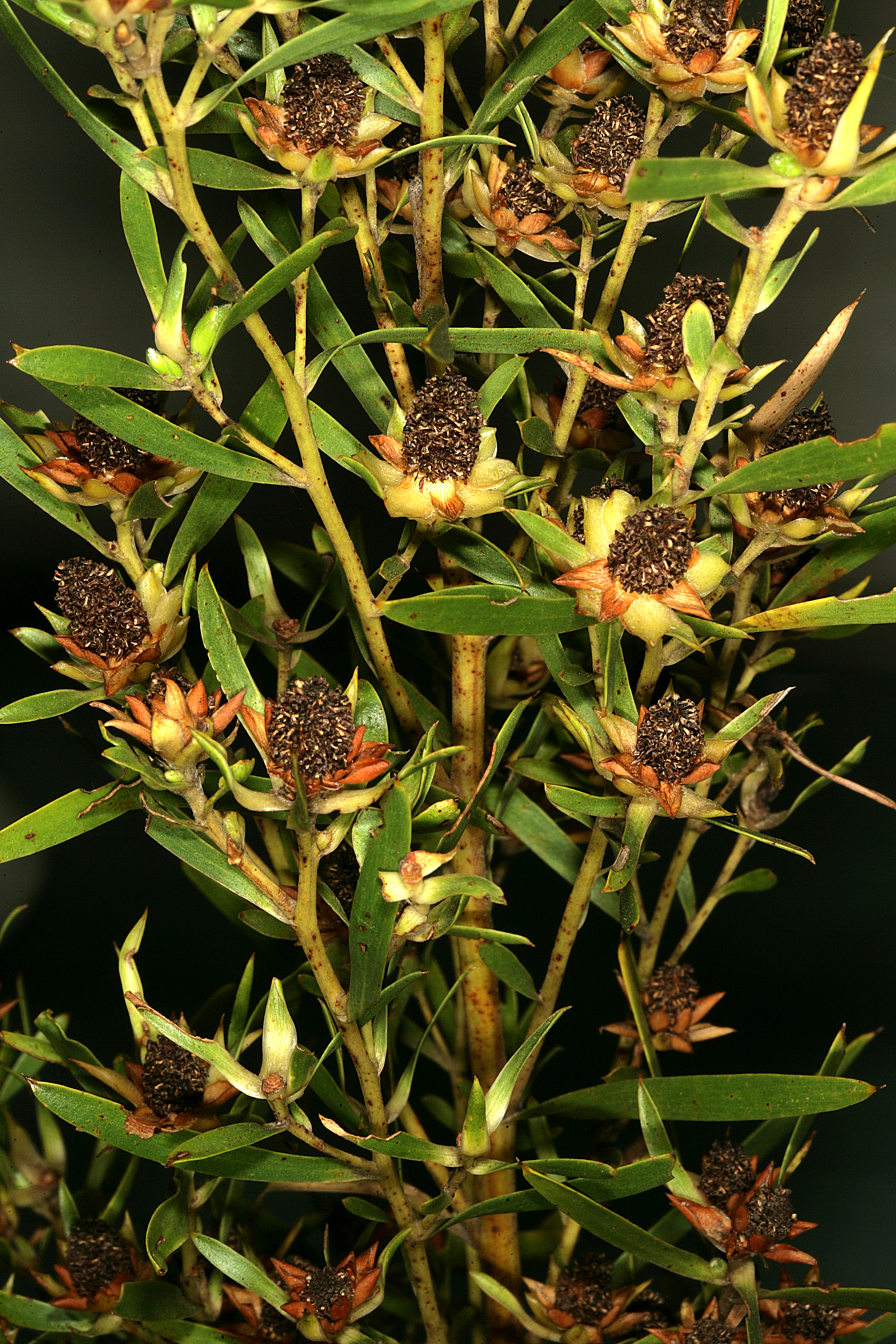

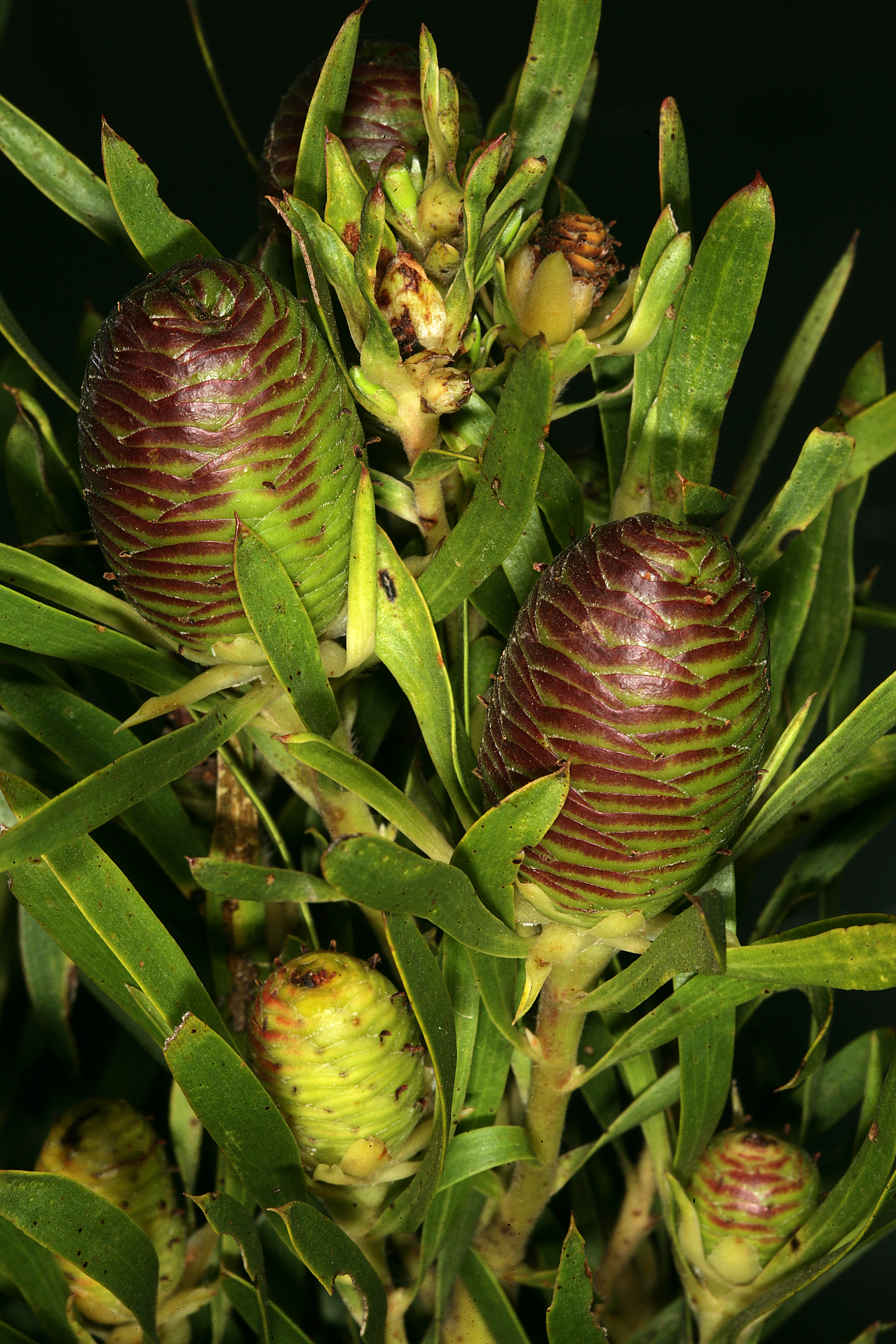
