= Renosterberg Local Municipality elections =

The Renosterberg Local Municipality council consists of nine members elected by mixed-member proportional representation. Five councillors are elected by first-past-the-post voting in five wards, while the remaining four are chosen from party lists so that the total number of party representatives is proportional to the number of votes received. In the election of 1 November 2021 the African National Congress (ANC) won a majority of five seats.

== Results ==
The following table shows the composition of the council after past elections.

Event	ANC	DA	Other	Total
2000 election	3	4	—	7
2006 election	4	2	1	7
2011 election	4	1	2	7
2016 election	4	3	0	7
2021 election	5	3	1	9

== December 2000 election ==
The following table shows the results of the 2000 election.

Party	Ward			List			Total seats
Party	Votes	%	Seats	Votes	%	Seats	Total seats
Democratic Alliance	1,879	53.78	2	1,863	53.24	2	4
African National Congress	1,615	46.22	2	1,636	46.76	1	3
Total	3,494	100.00	4	3,499	100.00	3	7
Valid votes	3,494	98.15		3,499	98.12		
Invalid/blank votes	66	1.85		67	1.88		
Total votes	3,560	100.00		3,566	100.00		
Registered voters/turnout	4,976	71.54		4,976	71.66		

== March 2006 election ==
The following table shows the results of the 2006 election.

Party	Ward			List			Total seats
Party	Votes	%	Seats	Votes	%	Seats	Total seats
African National Congress	2,327	63.15	3	2,444	65.28	1	4
Democratic Alliance	910	24.69	1	877	23.42	1	2
Independent Democrats	298	8.09	0	286	7.64	1	1
Freedom Front Plus	75	2.04	0	86	2.30	0	0
African Christian Democratic Party	75	2.04	0	51	1.36	0	0
Total	3,685	100.00	4	3,744	100.00	3	7
Valid votes	3,685	96.74		3,744	98.06		
Invalid/blank votes	124	3.26		74	1.94		
Total votes	3,809	100.00		3,818	100.00		
Registered voters/turnout	5,980	63.70		5,980	63.85		

== May 2011 election ==
The following table shows the results of the 2011 election.

Party	Ward			List			Total seats
Party	Votes	%	Seats	Votes	%	Seats	Total seats
African National Congress	2,468	57.69	3	2,470	57.68	1	4
Congress of the People	967	22.60	1	964	22.51	1	2
Democratic Alliance	798	18.65	0	788	18.40	1	1
African Christian Democratic Party	45	1.05	0	60	1.40	0	0
Total	4,278	100.00	4	4,282	100.00	3	7
Valid votes	4,278	98.71		4,282	98.85		
Invalid/blank votes	56	1.29		50	1.15		
Total votes	4,334	100.00		4,332	100.00		
Registered voters/turnout	6,106	70.98		6,106	70.95		

== August 2016 election ==
The following table shows the results of the 2016 election.

Party	Ward			List			Total seats
Party	Votes	%	Seats	Votes	%	Seats	Total seats
African National Congress	2,311	52.51	2	2,281	51.86	2	4
Democratic Alliance	1,838	41.76	2	1,835	41.72	1	3
Economic Freedom Fighters	185	4.20	0	207	4.71	0	0
Freedom Front Plus	67	1.52	0	75	1.71	0	0
Total	4,401	100.00	4	4,398	100.00	3	7
Valid votes	4,401	97.91		4,398	98.46		
Invalid/blank votes	94	2.09		69	1.54		
Total votes	4,495	100.00		4,467	100.00		
Registered voters/turnout	6,391	70.33		6,391	69.90		

== November 2021 election ==
The following table shows the results of the 2021 election.

Party	Ward			List			Total seats
Party	Votes	%	Seats	Votes	%	Seats	Total seats
African National Congress	2,478	53.30	4	2,444	52.72	1	5
Democratic Alliance	1,333	28.67	1	1,336	28.82	2	3
Economic Freedom Fighters	641	13.79	0	668	14.41	1	1
Freedom Front Plus	181	3.89	0	188	4.06	0	0
Independent candidates	16	0.34	0				0
Total	4,649	100.00	5	4,636	100.00	4	9
Valid votes	4,649	98.68		4,636	98.49		
Invalid/blank votes	62	1.32		71	1.51		
Total votes	4,711	100.00		4,707	100.00		
Registered voters/turnout	6,889	68.38		6,889	68.33		
