= R364 road =

R364 road may refer to:

- R364 road (Ireland)
- R364 road (South Africa)
