= R366 road =

R366 road may refer to:

- R366 road (Ireland)
- R366 road (South Africa)
