= R389 road =

R389 road may refer to:

- R389 road (Ireland)
- R389 road (South Africa)
