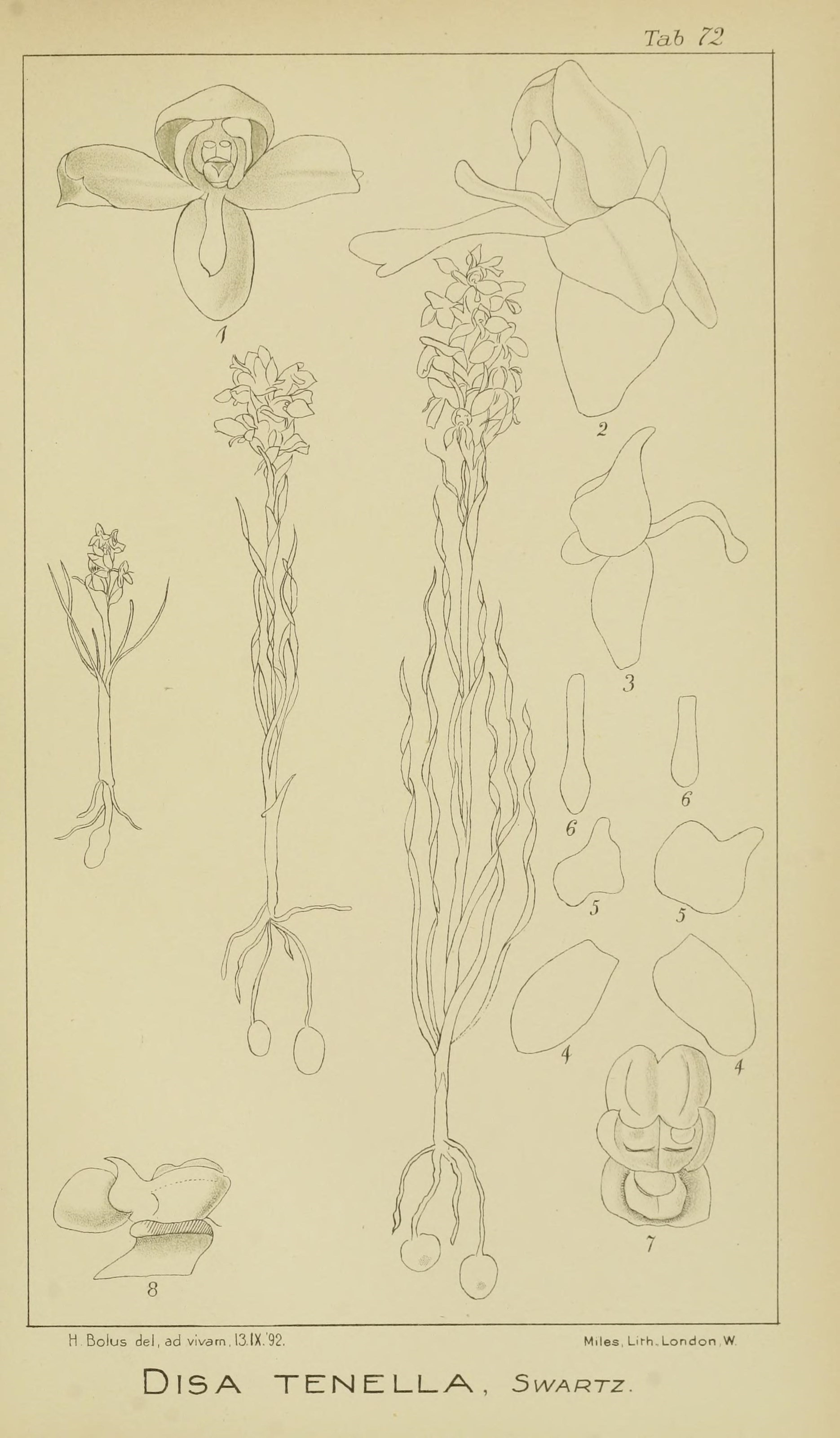

Scientific classification
- Kingdom: Plantae
- Clade: Tracheophytes
- Clade: Angiosperms
- Clade: Monocots
- Order: Asparagales
- Family: Orchidaceae
- Subfamily: Orchidoideae
- Genus: Disa
- Species: D. tenella

Binomial name
- Disa tenella (L.f.) Sw.

Synonyms
- Orchis tenella L.f.; Orchis tenuifolia Burm.f.; Satyrium tenellum (L.f.) Thunb.

= Disa tenella =

Species of flowering plant

Disa tenella is a perennial plant and geophyte belonging to the genus Disa and is part of the fynbos and renosterveld. The plant is endemic to the Western Cape and occurs from Porterville to Malmesbury and Gordon's Bay. It is extinct on the Cape Flats. The plant has a range of 2105 km2 in which only three to four subpopulations remain. More than 50% of the plant samples from before 1950 come from areas that were ceded to suburban development. The species' numbers are still declining due to invasive plants and crop cultivation.

There are two subspecies:

- Disa tenella subsp. pusilla H.P.Linder
- Disa tenella subsp. tenella
