= Philipstown =

Philipstown may refer to:

- Philipstown, Northern Cape, South Africa
- Philipstown, New York, United States
- A former name for Daingean, Ireland

== See also ==
- Phillipstown
- Philipsburg Manor, spelled variously Philipse, Philipseborough, Philipsburgh, and Philipsbourg
