= Vanderkloof =

- Location within Northern Cape Location within South Africa
- Coordinates: 30°0′S 24°44′E
- Country: South Africa
- Province: Northern Cape
- District: Pixley ka Seme
- Municipality: Renosterberg

Area
  - Total: 4.91 km^{2} (1.90 sq mi)

Population (2011)
  - Total: 1,228
  - Density: 250/km^{2} (648/sq mi)

Racial makeup (2011)
  - Black African: 17.8%
  - Coloured: 45.3%
  - Indian/Asian: 0.4%
  - White: 35.2%
  - Other: 1.3%

First languages (2011)
  - Afrikaans: 90.1%
  - English: 3.1%
  - Xhosa: 3.1%
  - Tswana: 1.7%
  - Other: 2.0%
- Time zone: UTC+2 (SAST)
- Postal code (street): 8771
- PO box: 8771
- Area code: 053

Vanderkloof is a town in the Northern Cape province of South Africa. It is located on the Orange River and near the Rolfontein Nature Reserve.

The village is on the site of the Vanderkloof Dam, (formerly the P.K. le Roux Dam), 9 km north-east of Petrusville. It was established to house the labour force constructing the dam. The name is derived from the surname of Petrus J van der Walt, and a ravine (Afrikaans kloof) in the vicinity.
