= Luckhoff =

- Location within Free State (South African province) Location within South Africa Location within Africa
- Coordinates: 29°45′S 24°47′E
- Country: South Africa
- Province: Free State
- District: Xhariep
- Municipality: Letsemeng

Area
  - Total: 30.92 km^{2} (11.94 sq mi)

Population (2011)
  - Total: 3,699
  - Density: 119.6/km^{2} (309.8/sq mi)

Racial makeup (2011)
  - Black African: 46.1%
  - Coloured: 49.1%
  - Indian/Asian: 0.7%
  - White: 3.9%
  - Other: 0.2%

First languages (2011)
  - Afrikaans: 77.2%
  - Sotho: 11.3%
  - Xhosa: 7.6%
  - English: 1.2%
  - Other: 2.7%
- Time zone: UTC+2 (SAST)
- Postal code (street): 9982
- PO box: 9982
- Area code: 053

Lückhoff is a small merino sheep farming town in the Free State province of South Africa. It was established on the farm Koffiekuil in 1892 and named after a Dutch Reformed Church minister Reverend HJ Luckhoff.

Nowadays the bulk of the sheep found in this district are dorper sheep and not merino. A small number of farmers also stock an indigenous sheep breed known as the damara.

The town is located 82 km north-west of Philippolis and 56 km west of Fauresmith. It was established in 1892 on the farm Koffiekuil and probably named after Heinrich Jacob Luckhoff (1842-1943), Minister of the Dutch Reformed Church in Fauresmith at that time.
