= Phillipstown =

Philipstown may refer to:

- Phillipstown, Caerphilly, Wales
- Phillipstown, New Zealand
- Phillipstown, Illinois, United States
- Phillipstown, Co. Louth Ireland

== See also ==
- Philipstown
