= R389 (South Africa) =

Regional route in South Africa

Regional route R389
- R389 route map

Location
- Country: South Africa

Highway system
- Numbered routes of South Africa
← R388	→ R390

The R389 is a Regional Route in South Africa that connects Noupoort with Philipstown in the Northern Cape.
