= R366 (South Africa) =

Regional route in South Africa

Regional route R366
- R366 route map

Route information
- Length: 55 km (34 mi)

Major junctions
- Northwest end: Elands Bay
- Southeast end: R365 north of Piketberg

Location
- Country: South Africa
- Towns: Elands Bay; Redelinghuys

Highway system
- Numbered routes of South Africa
← R365	→ R369

The R366 is a Regional Route in South Africa that connects Elands Bay in the north-west with the R365, and indirectly, Piketberg and the N7.

== Route ==
Starting in Elands Bay it runs south-east along the north bank of the Verlorenvlei River. After 28 kilometres, it passes Redelinghuys on the right. After a further 21 kilometres, it crosses the Kruismans River. It then veers east to end at a t-junction with the R365 after five kilometres. If you continue straight at the t-junction, you veer South towards Piketberg on R365. The turn-off north also continues as the R365, heading north-north-west to Leipoldtville and Lamberts Bay.
