= R387 (South Africa) =

Regional route in South Africa

Regional route R387
- R387 route map

Location
- Country: South Africa

Highway system
- Numbered routes of South Africa
← R386	→ R388

The R387 is a Regional Route in South Africa that connects the N12 near Strydenburg with the R369 near Orania.
