= R48 =

R48 may refer to:

- R48 (South Africa), a route
- D48 motorway, formerly R48 expressway, a road in the Czech Republic
- HMS Wrangler (R48), a destroyer of the Royal Navy
- R48: Danger of serious damage to health by prolonged exposure, a risk phrase
