= R388 (South Africa) =

Regional route in South Africa

Regional route R388
- R388 route map

Location
- Country: South Africa

Highway system
- Numbered routes of South Africa
← R387	→ R389

The R388 is a Regional Route in South Africa that connects Douglas with the R48 near De Aar.
