= Dasklip Pass =

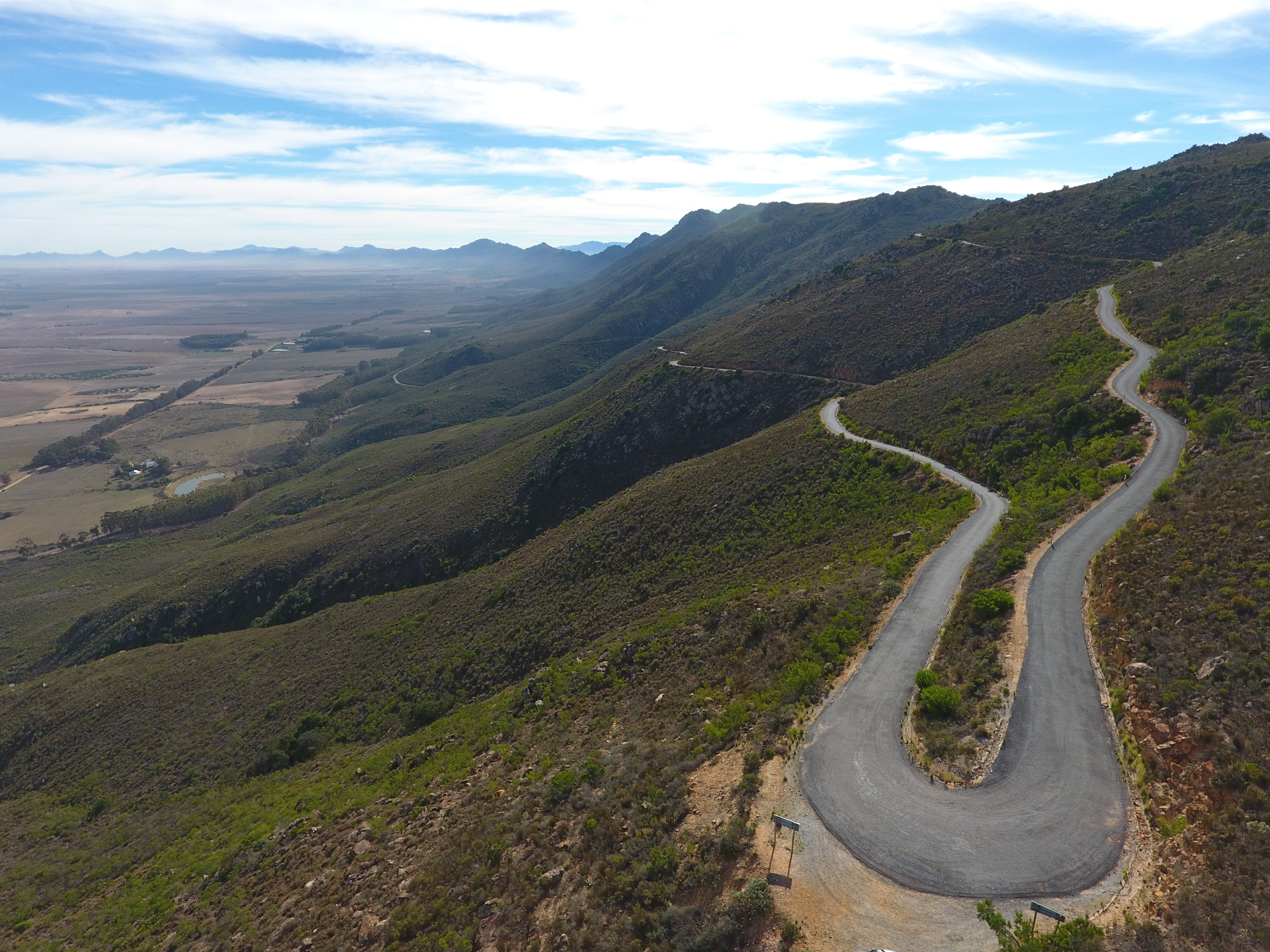
- An aerial view of the Dasklip Pass from the western side of the Groot Winterhoek.

- Location within Western Cape
- Elevation: 702 metres (2,303 ft)

Third Approach
- Location: Bergrivier Local Municipality, Western Cape, South Africa
- Range: Groot Winterhoek
- Coordinates: 32°54′S 19°2′E

Dasklip Pass is situated in the Western Cape province of South Africa on an off-road near Porterville along the R365 highway. The road provides access to the plateau in the Groot Winterhoek mountains and the Groot Winterhoek Wilderness Area; summiting at a height of 700 metres above sea level. It was privately built by farmers located on the plateau. The road was upgraded to an asphalt road in the early 2000s.

The road is noted for both its views of the Swartland plains below and as a popular launch site for hang gliders.

During the 2015 Western Cape fire season a fire fighter died when his vehicle veered off the pass.

== Gallery ==
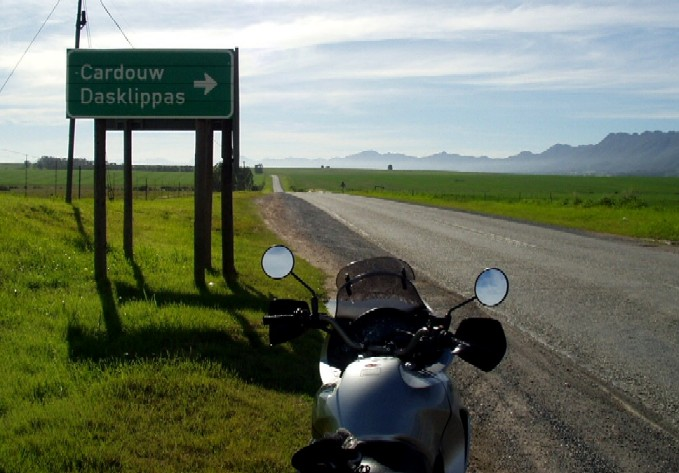
Road sign on the R365 turnoff to the pass

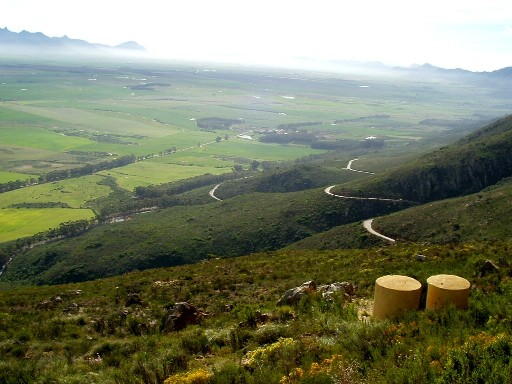
Part of the pass

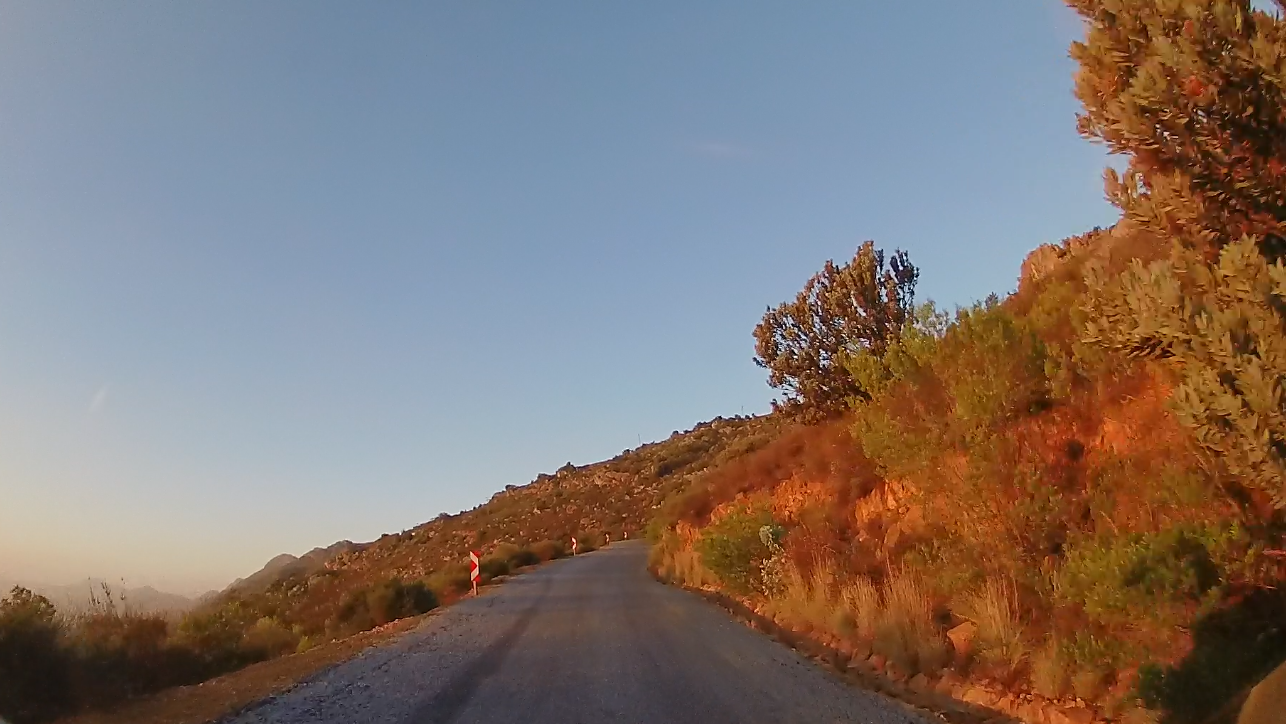
Riding up the Dasklip Pass at dusk.
