= Petrusville =

Petrusville: T'Kanee (Khoekhoe)
- Location within Northern Cape Location within South Africa
- Coordinates: 30°5′S 24°39′E
- Country: South Africa
- Province: Northern Cape
- District: Pixley ka Seme
- Municipality: Renosterberg

Area
  - Total: 58.60 km^{2} (22.63 sq mi)

Population (2011)
  - Total: 5,211
  - Density: 88.92/km^{2} (230.3/sq mi)

Racial makeup (2011)
  - Black African: 40.0%
  - Coloured: 56.6%
  - Indian/Asian: 0.8%
  - White: 2.1%
  - Other: 0.5%

First languages (2011)
  - Afrikaans: 63.3%
  - Xhosa: 31.4%
  - Sotho: 1.9%
  - English: 1.7%
  - Other: 1.8%
- Time zone: UTC+2 (SAST)
- Postal code (street): 8770
- PO box: 8770
- Area code: 053

Petrusville is a village in the eastern Karoo region of South Africa, located in the Northern Cape province.

It is 45 km north-east of Philipstown, 56 km south-east of Kraankuil and 10 km south of the Orange River. Founded about 1877 on the farm Rhenosterfontein and named after Petrus Jacobus van der Walt who had purchased it from Adam Kok ii in 1810 and donated a portion of it to the Dutch Reformed Church in 1822. It was named T'Kanee in Khoekhoe. New evidence gathered suggests that people lived in Petrusville before 1800 and its believed that Petrusville was the old soldiers camp. The evidence is the old cemetery situated behind izinyoka Revonia area and others in the plakkerskamp. There are tombstone shows that Petrusville was there since 1803.
