= Renosterberg Local Municipality =

Renosterberg
- Local municipality
- Seal

- Location in the Northern Cape
- Coordinates: 30°15′S 24°30′E
- Country: South Africa
- Province: Northern Cape
- District: Pixley ka Seme
- Seat: Petrusville
- Wards: 5

Government
  - Type: Municipal council
  - Mayor: Andrew Samson

Area
  - Total: 5,527 km^{2} (2,134 sq mi)

Population (2022)
  - Total: 10,843
  - Density: 1.962/km^{2} (5.081/sq mi)

Racial makeup (2022)
  - Black African: 28.8%
  - Coloured: 56.7%
  - Indian/Asian: 1.1%
  - White: 13.4%

First languages (2011)
  - Afrikaans: 71.4%
  - Xhosa: 24.0%
  - English: 1.5%
  - Sotho: 1.3%
  - Other: 1.8%
- Time zone: UTC+2 (SAST)
- Municipal code: NC075

Renosterberg Municipality (Afrikaans: Renosterberg Munisipaliteit; Xhosa: uMasipala wase Renosterberg) is a local municipality within the Pixley ka Seme District Municipality, in the Northern Cape province of South Africa.

== Main places ==
The 2001 census divided the municipality into the following main places:

Place	Code	Area (km^{2})	Population	Most spoken language
Lukhanyisweni	31101	1.05	716	Xhosa
Petrusville	31102	59.20	2,768	Afrikaans
Phillipstown	31103	1.83	2,062	Afrikaans
Thembinkosi	31105	0.21	816	Xhosa
Vanderkloof	31106	5.92	1,011	Afrikaans
Remainder of the municipality	31104	5,461.75	1,698	Afrikaans

== Politics ==
The municipal council consists of nine members elected by mixed-member proportional representation. Five councillors are elected by first-past-the-post voting in five wards, while the remaining four are chosen from party lists so that the total number of party representatives is proportional to the number of votes received. In the election of 1 November 2021 the African National Congress (ANC) won a majority of five seats on the council.

The following table shows the results of the election.

Renosterberg local election, 1 November 2021
Party	Votes				Seats		
Party	Ward	List	Total	%	Ward	List	Total
African National Congress	2,478	2,444	4,922	53.0%	4	1	5
Democratic Alliance	1,333	1,336	2,669	28.7%	1	2	3
Economic Freedom Fighters	641	668	1,309	14.1%	0	1	1
Freedom Front Plus	181	188	369	4.0%	0	0	0
Independent candidates	16	–	16	0.2%	0	–	0
Total	4,649	4,636	9,285		5	4	9
Valid votes	4,649	4,636	9,285	98.6%			
Spoilt votes	62	71	133	1.4%			
Total votes cast	4,711	4,707	9,418				
Voter turnout	4,713						
Registered voters	6,889						
Turnout percentage	68.4%						

== Financial mismanagement ==
On 26 September 2024 Renosterberg local municipality senior managers were taken to court over R73.5 million rands of worker's pension funds that were never paid to the administration. The mayor stated that workers may not be able to access their funds due to the municipality's financial problems.

In January 2025, the municipality was listed as one of the top ten municipalities in arrears on their pension contributions.
