= R364 (South Africa) =

Regional route in South Africa

Regional route R364
- R364 route map

Route information
- Length: 178 km (111 mi)

Major junctions
- East end: R27 between Nieuwoudtville and Calvinia
- N7 outside Clanwilliam
- West end: R365 in Lamberts Bay

Location
- Country: South Africa
- Towns: Clanwilliam; Graafwater; Lamberts Bay

Highway system
- Numbered routes of South Africa
← R363	→ R365

The R364 is a Regional Route in South Africa that connects Lamberts Bay to the R27 between Calvinia and Nieuwoudtville via Clanwilliam.

== Route ==
The route's western terminus is the R365 at Lambert's Bay. It heads east for 31 kilometres, reaching Graafwater. From Graafwater, it continues east for 28 kilometres to reach an interchange with the N7 near Clanwilliam. After another three kilometres heading east, it reaches Clanwilliam. From Clanwilliam, it enters the Cederberg range where it runs through the Pakhuis Pass. From there, it winds north-north-east through another two passes, Botterkloof Pass and Bloukrans Pass, to reach its terminus at the R27 near Calvinia. The total distance from Clanwilliam to the R27 is 116 kilometres.
