= Leipoldtville =

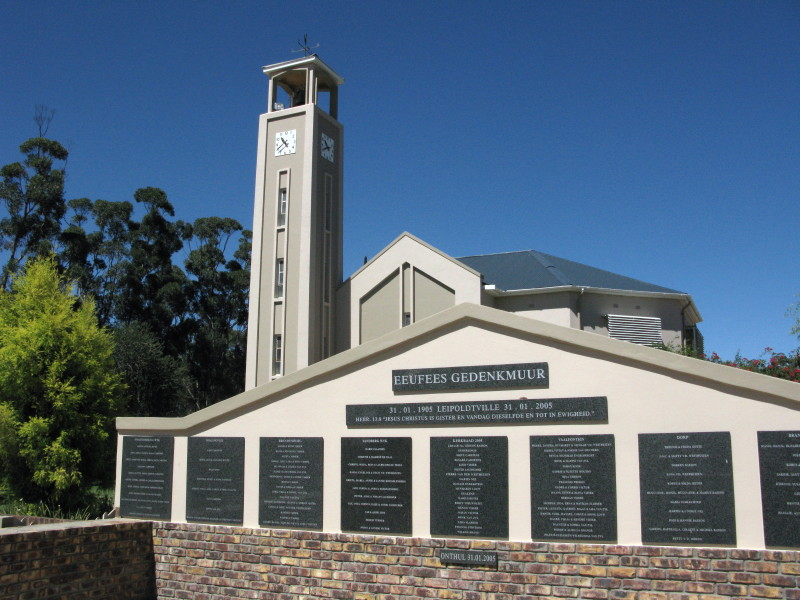
- Church in Leipoldtville

- Location within Western Cape Location within South Africa
- Coordinates: 32.222°S 18.481°E
- Country: South Africa
- Province: Western Cape
- District: West Coast
- Municipality: Cederberg

Area
  - Total: 0.65 km^{2} (0.25 sq mi)

Population (2011)
  - Total: 298
  - Density: 460/km^{2} (1,200/sq mi)

Racial makeup (2011)
  - Black African: 7.7%
  - Coloured: 79.5%
  - Indian/Asian: 1.7%
  - White: 11.1%

First languages (2011)
  - Afrikaans: 96.3%
  - English: 1.7%
  - Other: 2.0%
- Time zone: UTC+2 (SAST)
- PO box: 8122
- Area code: 027

Leipoldtville is a town in Cederberg Local Municipality in the Western Cape province of South Africa.

It is located 40 km (25 mi) West-Southwest of Clanwilliam and 27 km (17 mi) Southeast of Lambert's Bay. The town is named after the Reverend C F Leipoldt, a Dutch Reformed minister in Clanwilliam from 1884 to 1910 and father of the Afrikaans poet C. Louis Leipoldt.
