= Eendekuil =

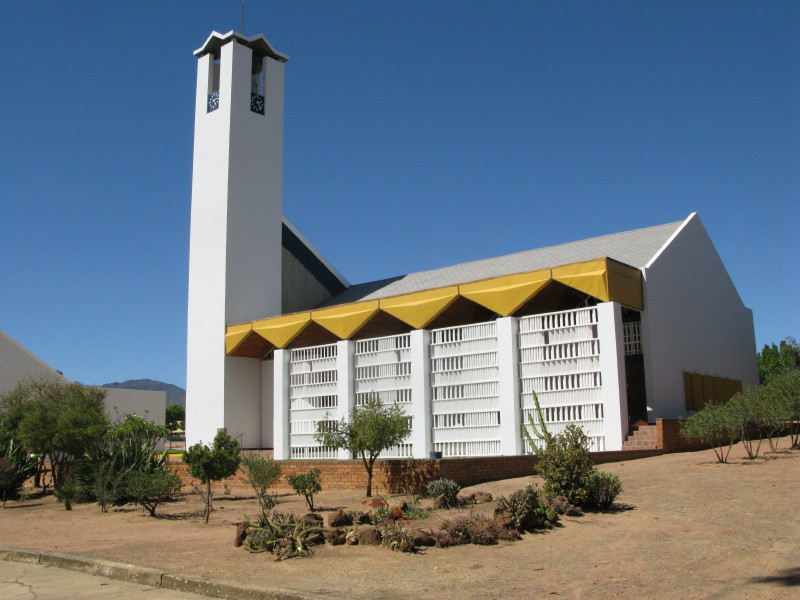
- Eendekuil Church

- Location within Western Cape Location within South Africa
- Coordinates: 32°41′S 18°53′E
- Country: South Africa
- Province: Western Cape
- District: West Coast
- Municipality: Bergrivier

Area
  - Total: 0.85 km^{2} (0.33 sq mi)

Population (2011)
  - Total: 1,530
  - Density: 1,800/km^{2} (4,700/sq mi)

Racial makeup (2011)
  - Black African: 2.2%
  - Coloured: 89.3%
  - Indian/Asian: 1.1%
  - White: 6.5%
  - Other: 0.9%

First languages (2011)
  - Afrikaans: 96.9%
  - Other: 3.1%
- Time zone: UTC+2 (SAST)
- PO box: 7335
- Area code: 022

Eendekuil is a settlement in West Coast District Municipality in the Western Cape province of South Africa.

Situated 30 km (19 mi) north of Piketberg and 145 km (90 km) from Cape Town.The village was the terminus of the Cape Town railway until the end of the Anglo-Boer War, and it remains the railhead for the Citrusdal region, which lies on the other side of the Olifants River.
