= Groot Winterhoek =

Mountain range in the Western Cape region of South Africa

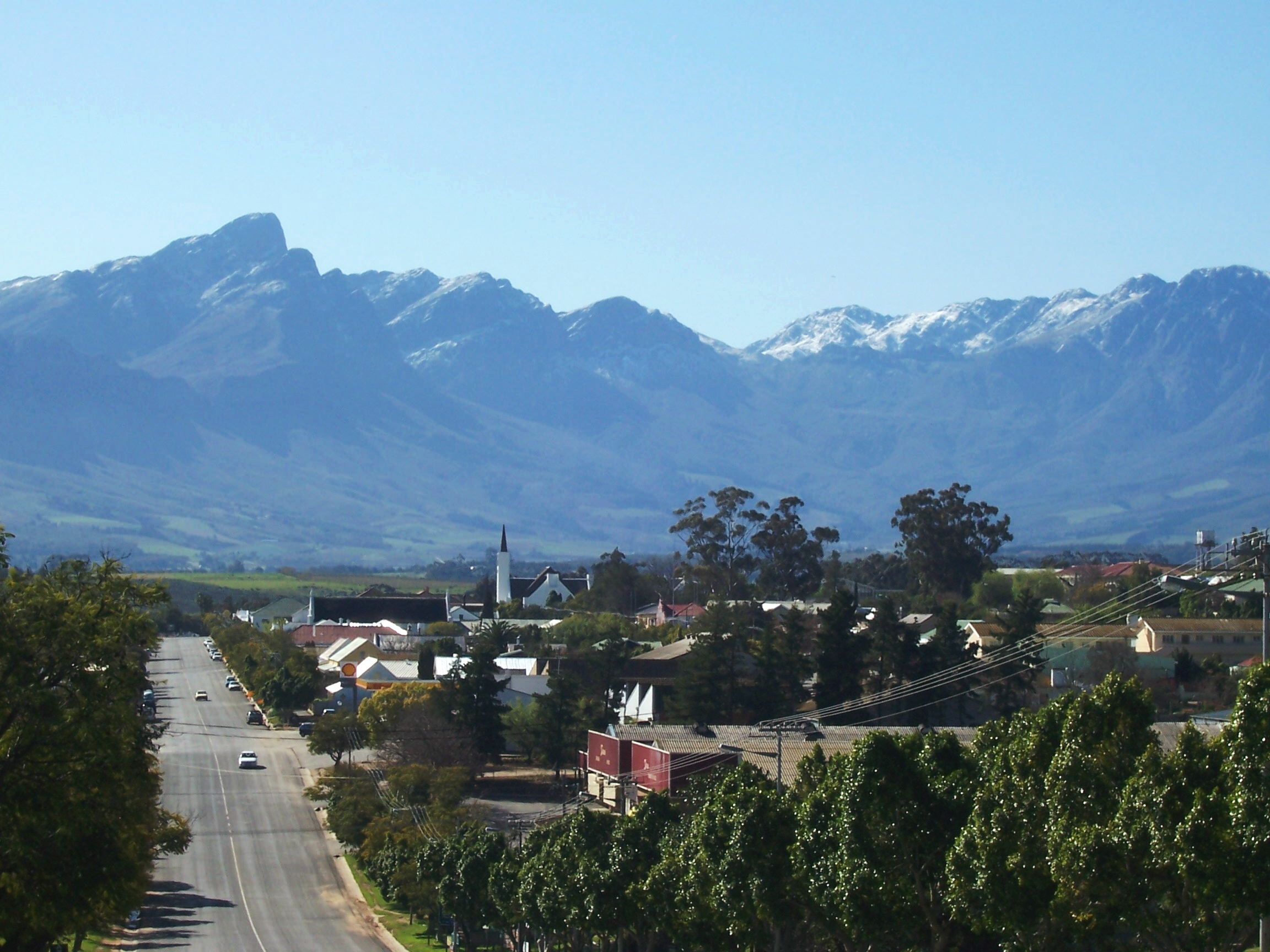
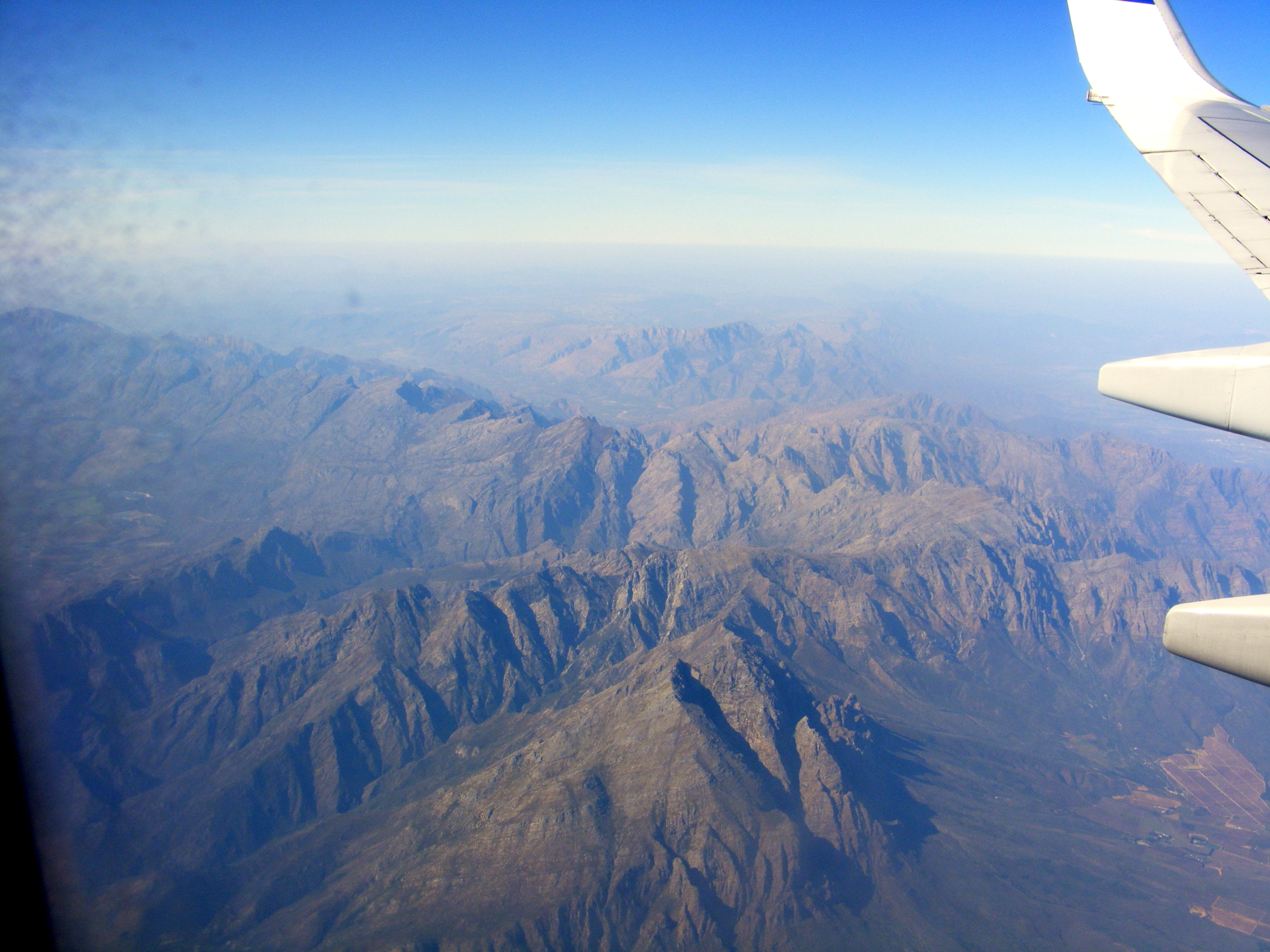
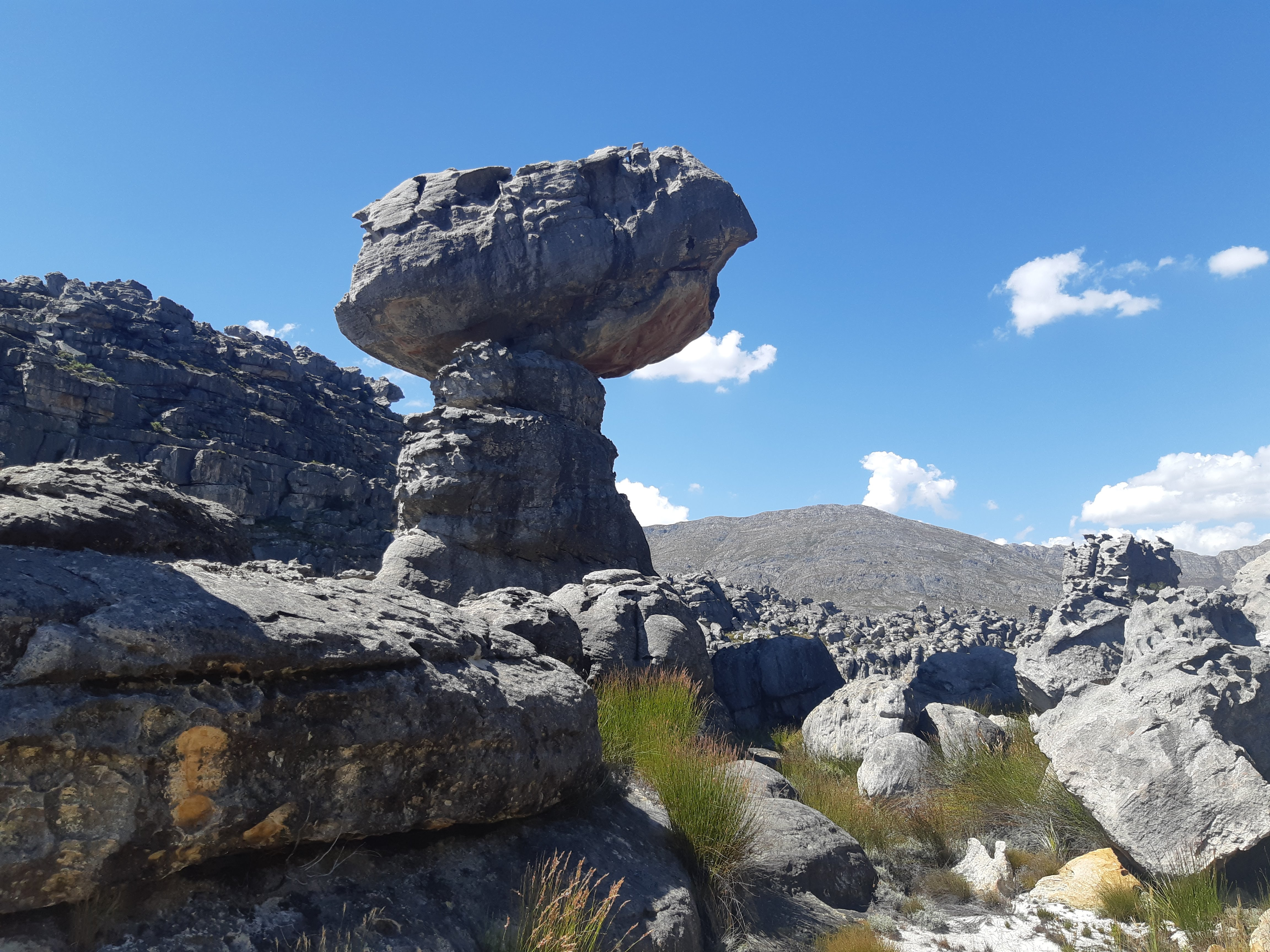
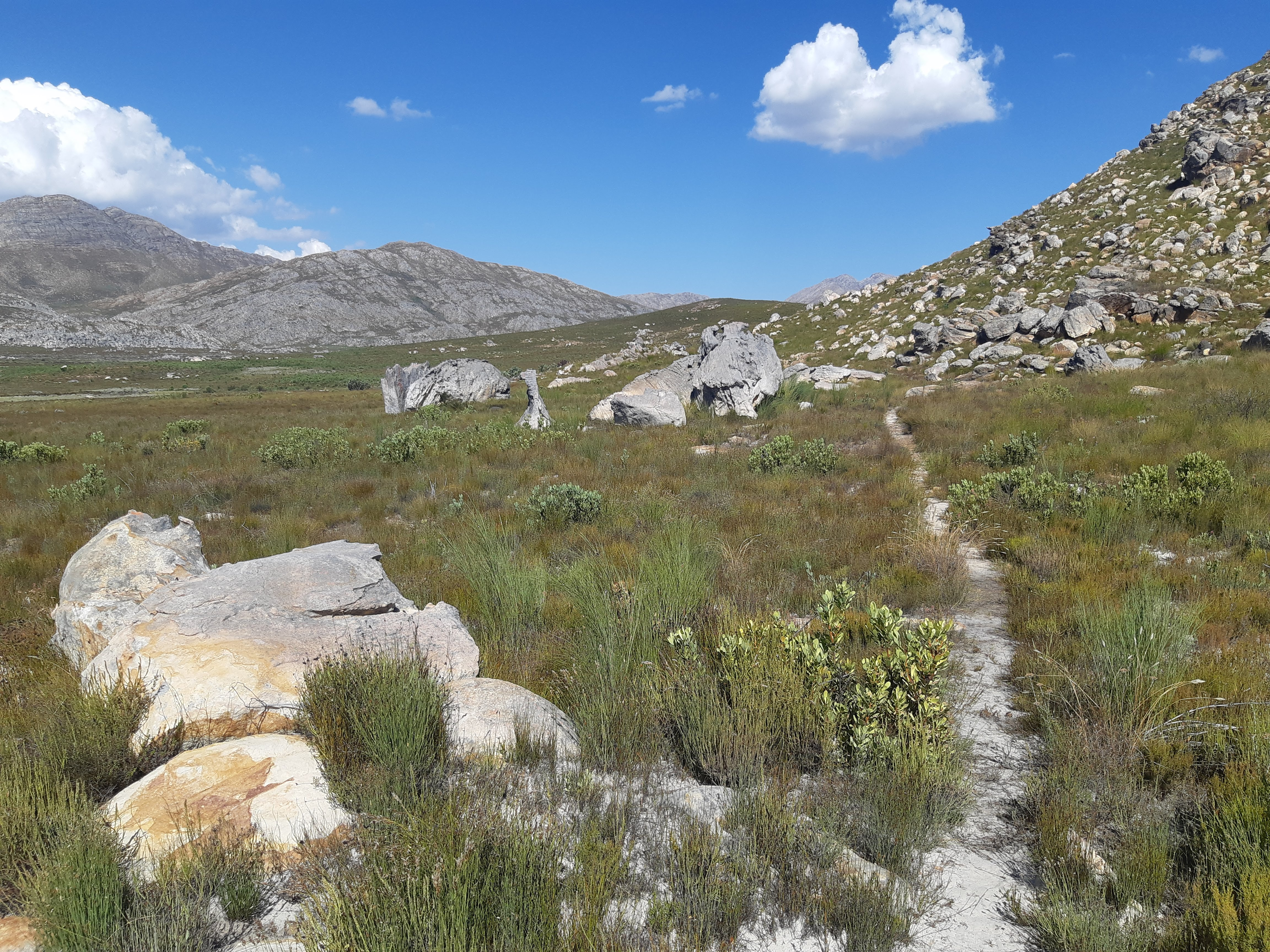
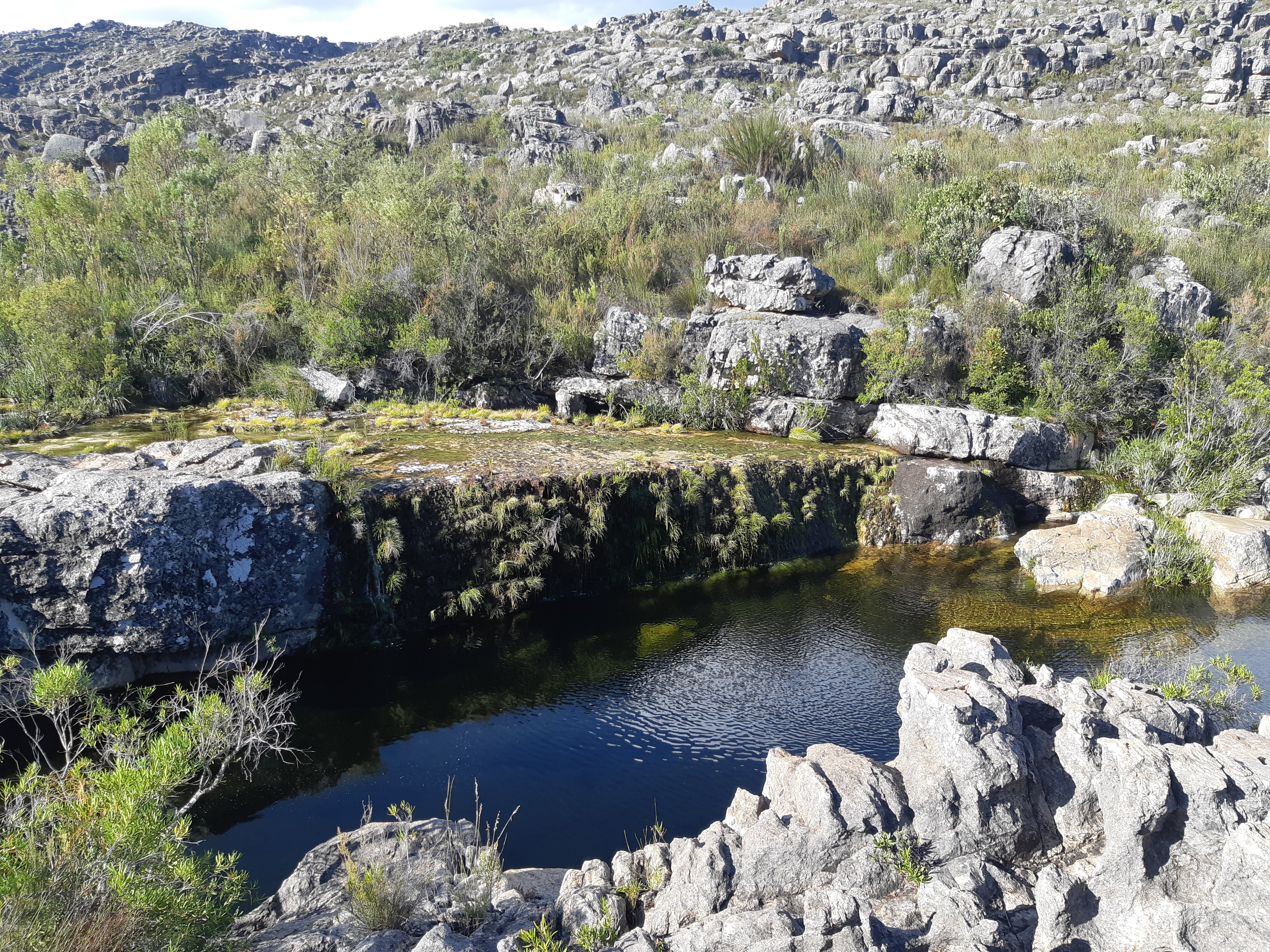
- Top: Winterhoek Mountains from the town of Tulbagh in Die Land van Waveren. Mid left: an aerial view of the mountains. Mid right: rock formations in the Groot Winterhoek. Bottom left: hiking trail in the mountains. Bottom right: a rockpool in the mountains.

Highest point
- Peak: Groot Winterhoek peak
- Elevation: 2,077 m (6,814 ft)
- Prominence: 1,188 m (3,898 ft)
- Listing: Ribu
- Coordinates: 33°01′48″S 19°06′17″E

Dimensions
- Area: 5,526.06 km^{2} (2,133.62 mi^{2})

Geography
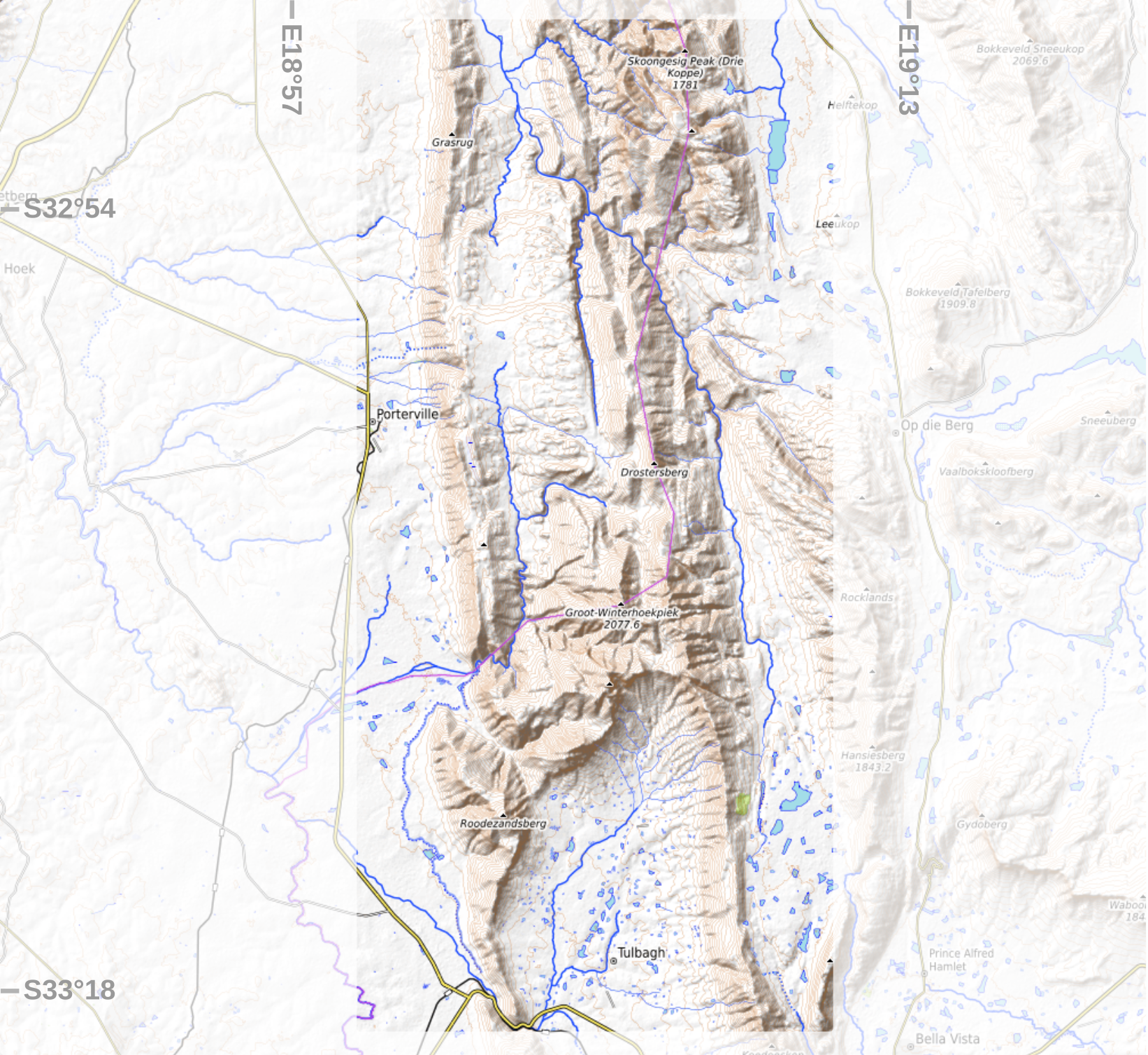
- Area map of the Groot Winterhoek with the town of Tulbagh to its south and the Skoongesig Peak to its north.
- Country: South Africa

Geology
- Orogeny: Cape Fold Belt
- Rock age: late Paleozoic
- Rock type: Table Mountain sandstone

The Groot Winterhoek mountains are located in the Western Cape province of South Africa and are part of the Cape Fold Belt comprising a watershed area of 552,606 ha (1,365,520 acres; 5,526.06 km^{2}; 2,133.62 sq mi). They rise to a maximum height of 2077 m just north of the town of Tulbagh as Groot Winterhoek peak. The mountains are predominantly made up of Table Mountain sandstone. Up to 83% of the range is still classified as being in a natural state and up to 72% of the range is protected. The towns of Saron and Porterville are located at the foot the mountain range's western side.

A plateau in the northern half of the mountains is accessible via the Dasklip Pass.

Mammals found in the range include klipspringer, grey rhebok, grysbok, Cape mountain leopard (Felis leopardus var. melanotica ), caracal, African wild cat, mongoose, and genets. A wide range of indigenous plant species, such as Agathosma, Aspalathus linearis and various proteas (all of which are harvested commercially), naturally grow in the area. Common insects in the area include Black Mound Termites.

Examples of San rock art dating back 6000 years can be found throughout the mountains.

== Groot Winterhoek Wilderness Area ==
The Groot Winterhoek Wilderness Area, operated by CapeNature, comprises a conservation area of 30,608 ha (75,630 acres; 306.08 km^{2}; 118.18 sq mi), and contains waterfalls, swimming holes, pristine rivers and mountain wilderness.

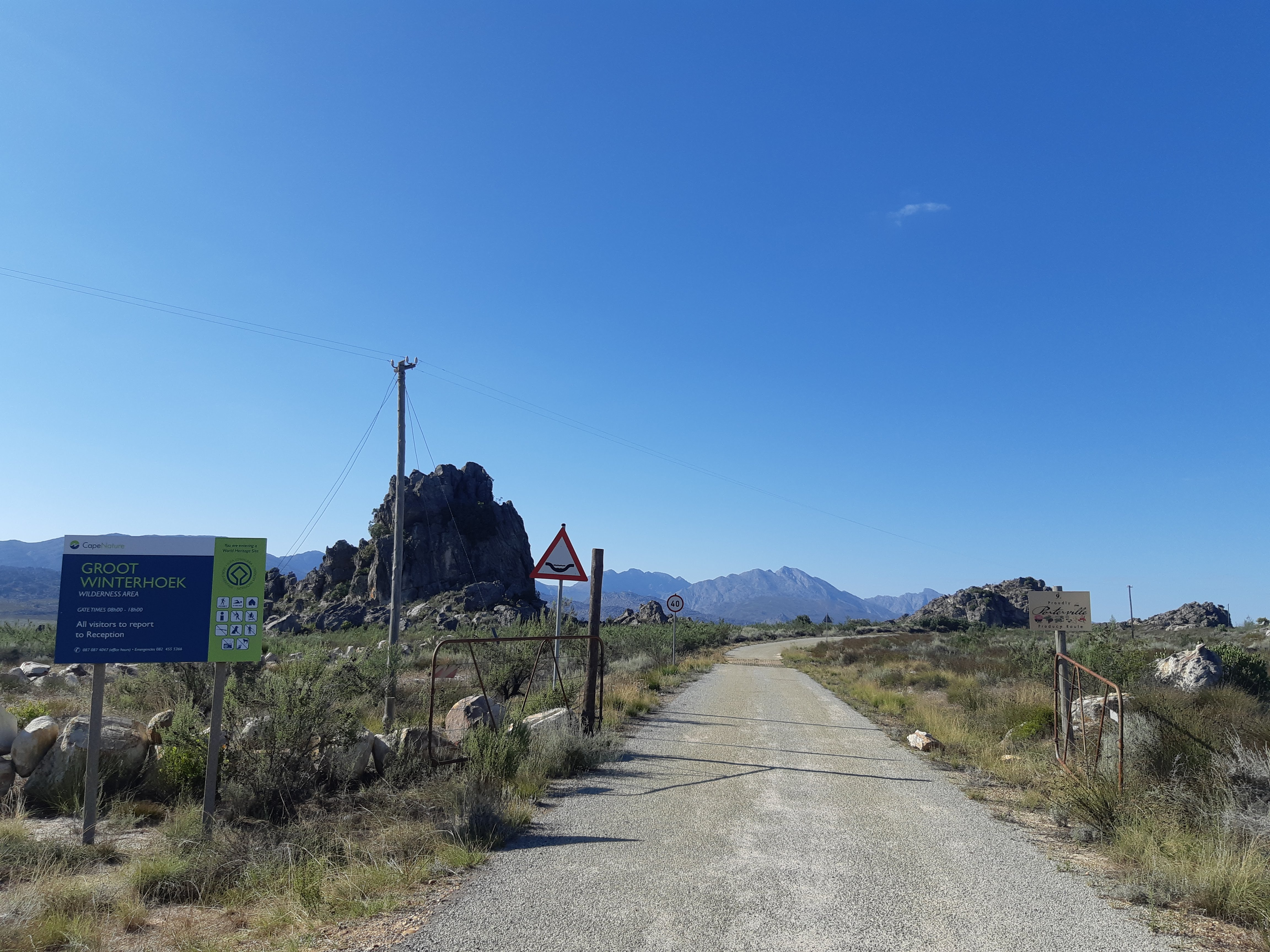
Groot Winterhoek Wilderness main entrance gate

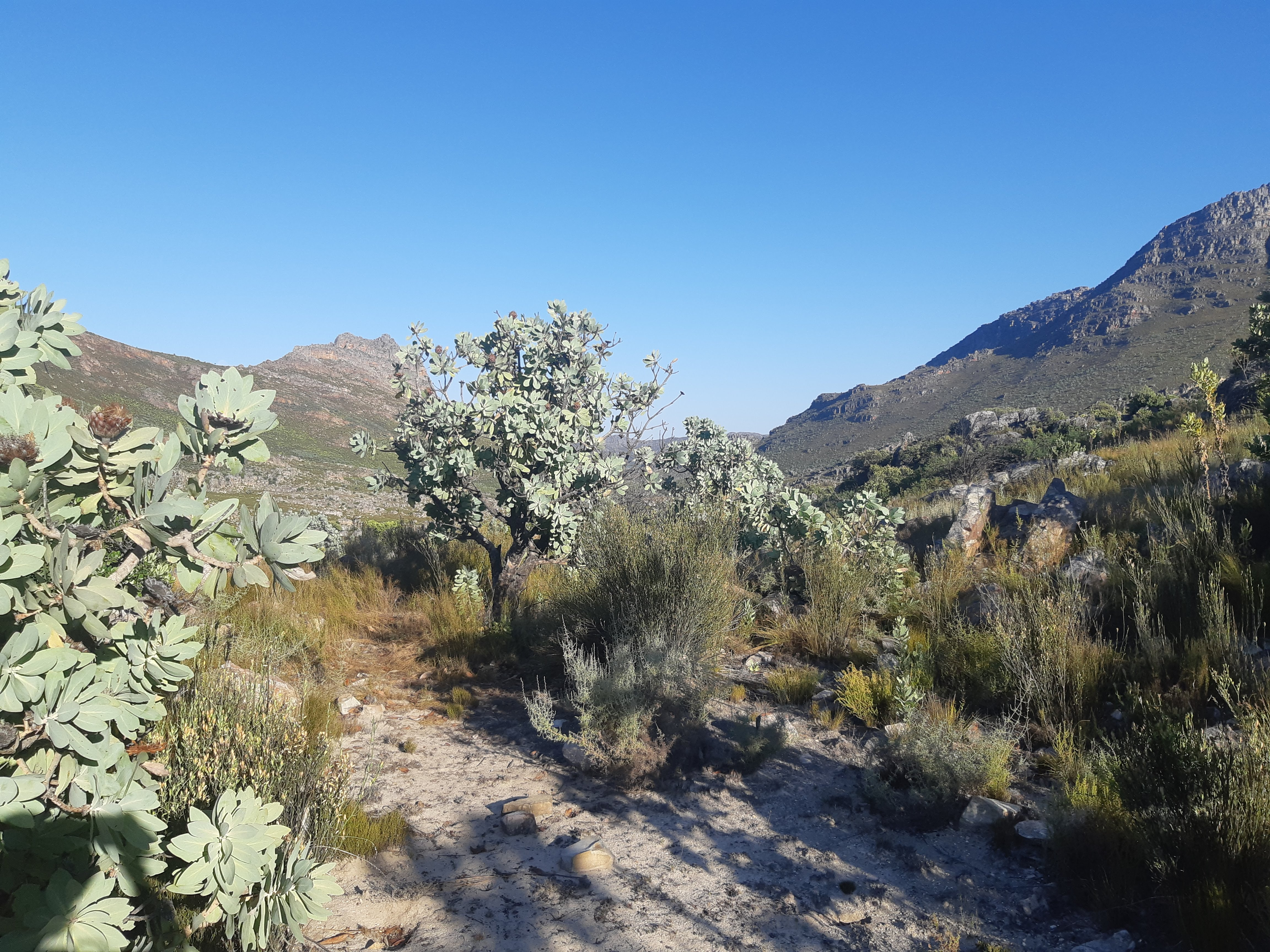
Protea trees and indigenous fynbos
