= Porterville, South Africa =

Porterville
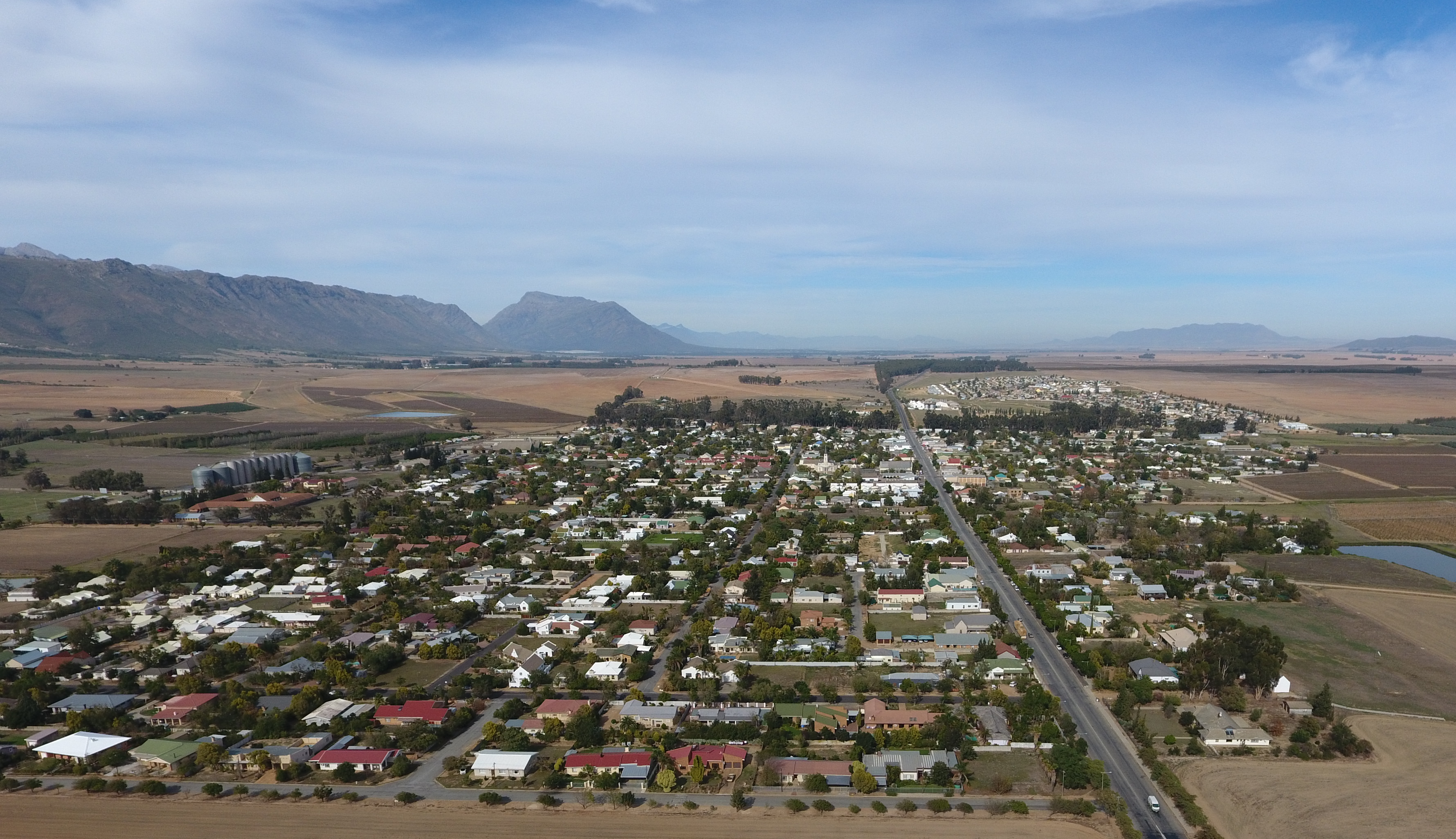
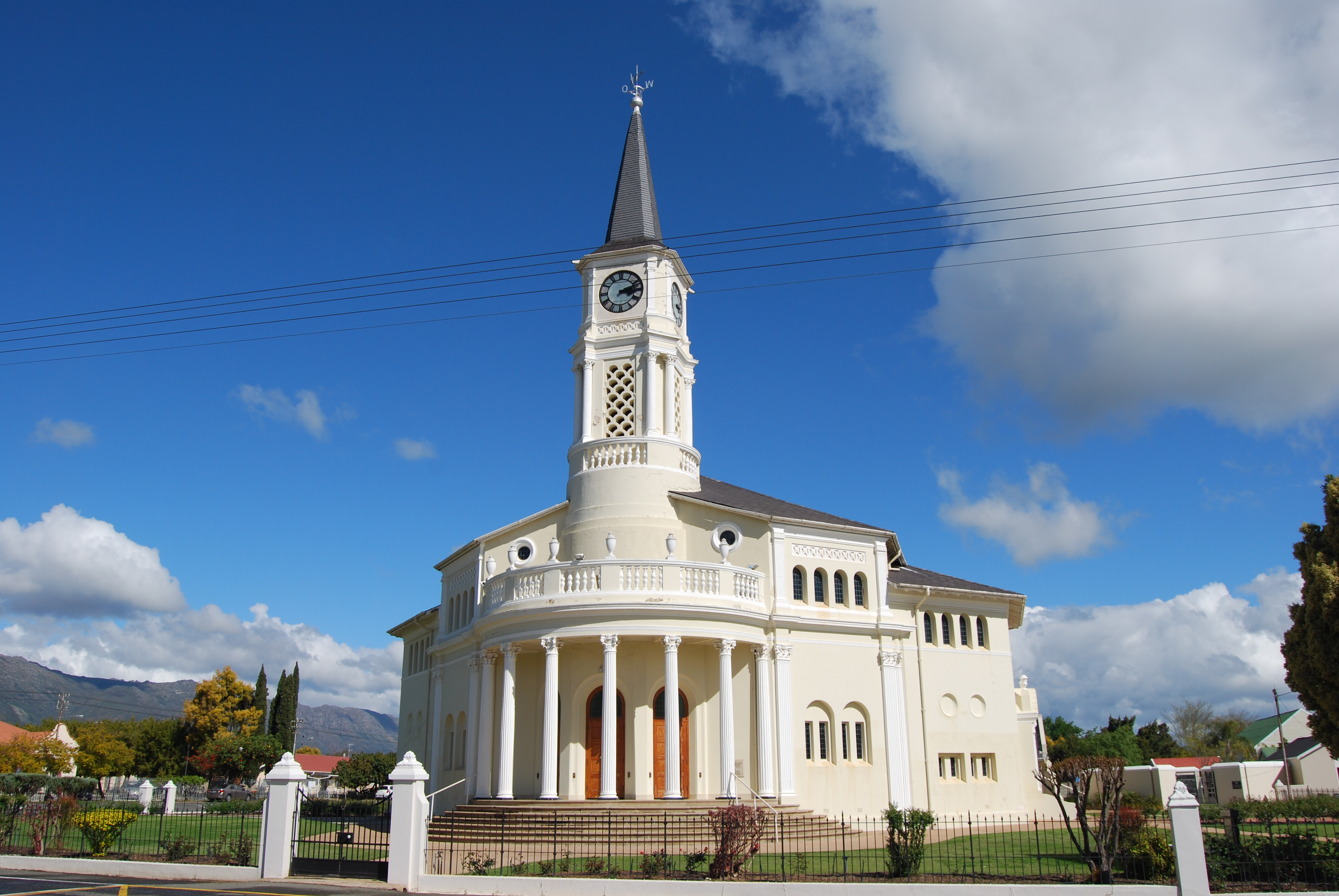
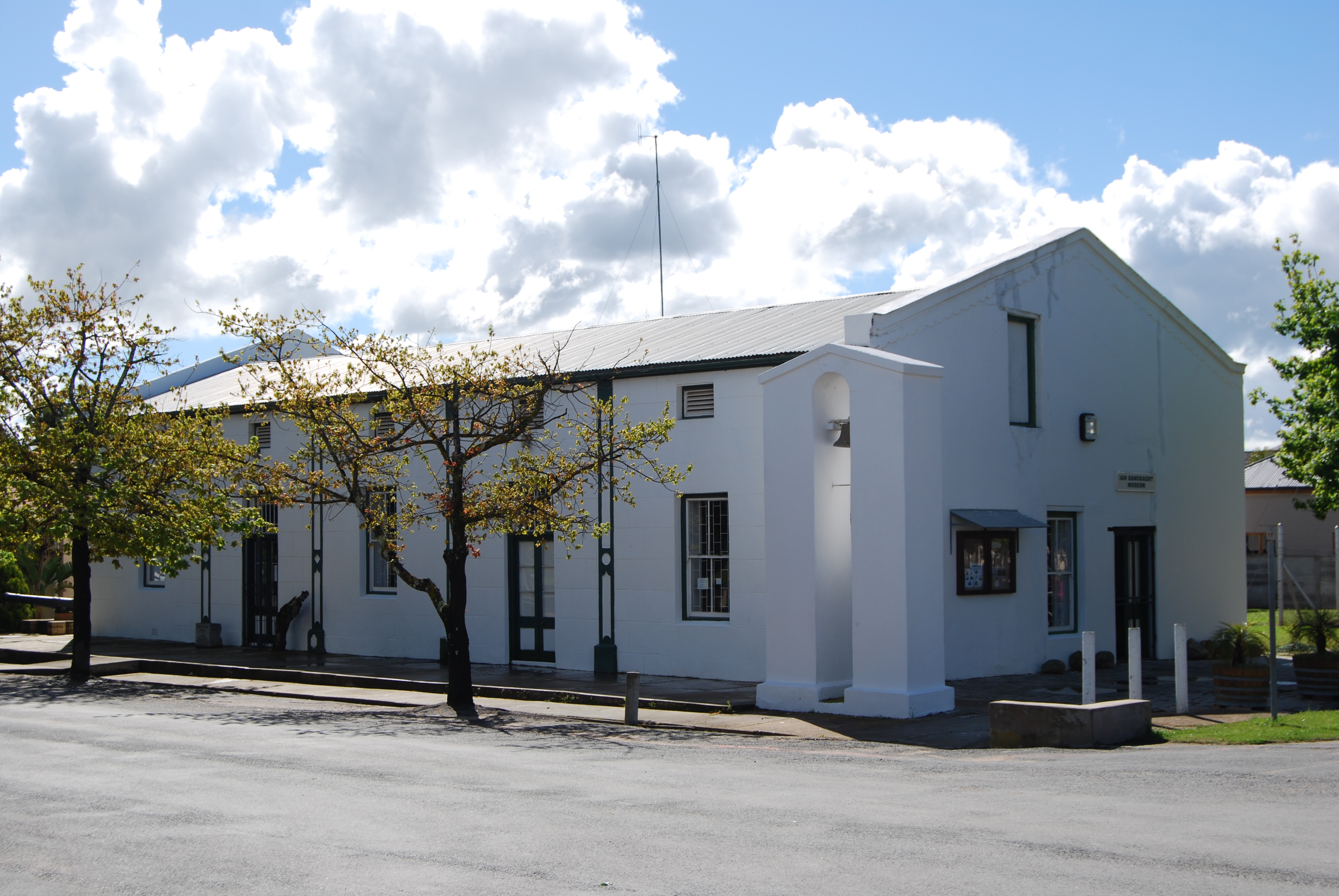
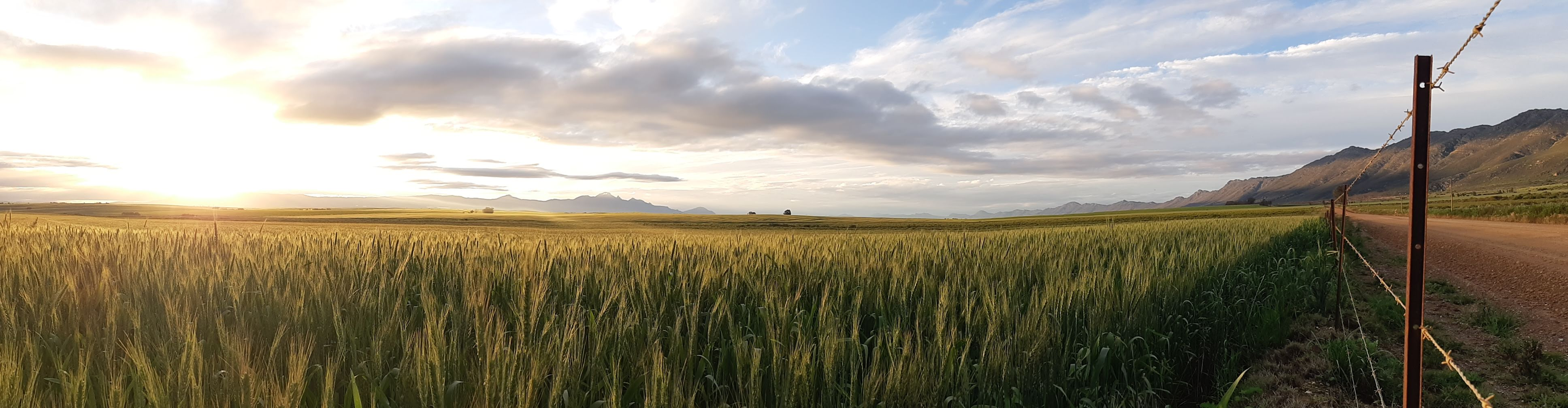
- From the top, an aerial photograph of Porterville in South Africa with the R44 road running through the town. In the left photograph, the Grootwinterhoek mountains can be seen in the distance. NG Kerk in Porterville (left). The Jan Danckaert Museum (right). Wheat is grown in the surrounding area (below).

- Location within Western Cape Location within South Africa
- Coordinates: 33°00′S 18°59′E
- Country: South Africa
- Province: Western Cape
- District: West Coast
- Municipality: Bergrivier

Government
  - Councillors: Koos Daniels (DA); Adam du Plooy (DA)

Area
  - Total: 7.98 km^{2} (3.08 sq mi)

Population (2011)
  - Total: 7,057
  - Density: 884/km^{2} (2,290/sq mi)

Racial makeup (2011)
  - Black African: 1.6%
  - Coloured: 76.4%
  - Indian/Asian: 0.4%
  - White: 21.0%
  - Other: 0.6%

First languages (2011)
  - Afrikaans: 96.0%
  - English: 1.9%
  - Other: 2.1%
- Time zone: UTC+2 (SAST)
- Postal code (street): 6810, 6811, 6812
- PO box: 6810
- Area code: 022

Porterville is a town in the Western Cape province of South Africa.

The town is located at the foot of the Olifants River Mountains, 27 km south-east of Piketberg and 155 km north-east of Cape Town. It is situated 140 km north of Cape Town on R44 road at the base of the Olifants River mountains. The Dasklip Pass to the surrounding Groot Winterhoek mountains is located 14 km outside of the town. The Soom Shale, a notable deposit of Late Ordovician period fossils, is located near the town. Agriculture in the area is dominated by wheat production. The closest towns are Piketberg to the west, Saron to the south, and Eendekuil and Citrusdal to the north.

== History ==
Prior to European settlement the area was inhabited by Khoikhoin nomadic pastoralists. The town was laid out in 1863 on a portion of Pomona farm owned by F.J. Owen. It was previously called Willems Vallei and was owned by Willem Berger. The town was established in 1863 and named after William Porter, who served as Attorney General of the Cape Colony from 1839 to 1866, and became a municipality in 1903.

== Demographics ==
Historical population
Year	Pop.	±%
2001	5,863	—
2011	7,057	+20.4%

According to the 2011 census, Porterville has a population of 7,057 people divided into 1,949 households. The census identifies residents' first languages as 96.0% Afrikaans, 1.9% English and 2.1% other. Within the population, 76.4% of residents identified themselves as "Coloured", 21.0% as "White" and 1.6% as "Black African". Porterville has an area of about 7.98 square km, with a density of 884.3 per square km. Minor area differences exist between figures extracted from the 2001 and 2011 censuses.

== Notable people ==
- Pieter Grobbelaar, South African World War II military commander was born in Porterville.
- Nataniël le Roux, South African TV personality, singer, writer, and composer
- Whitey Basson, South African businessman, former CEO of Shoprite Holdings Ltd, was born in Porterville.
