= Philipstown, South Africa =

Philipstown
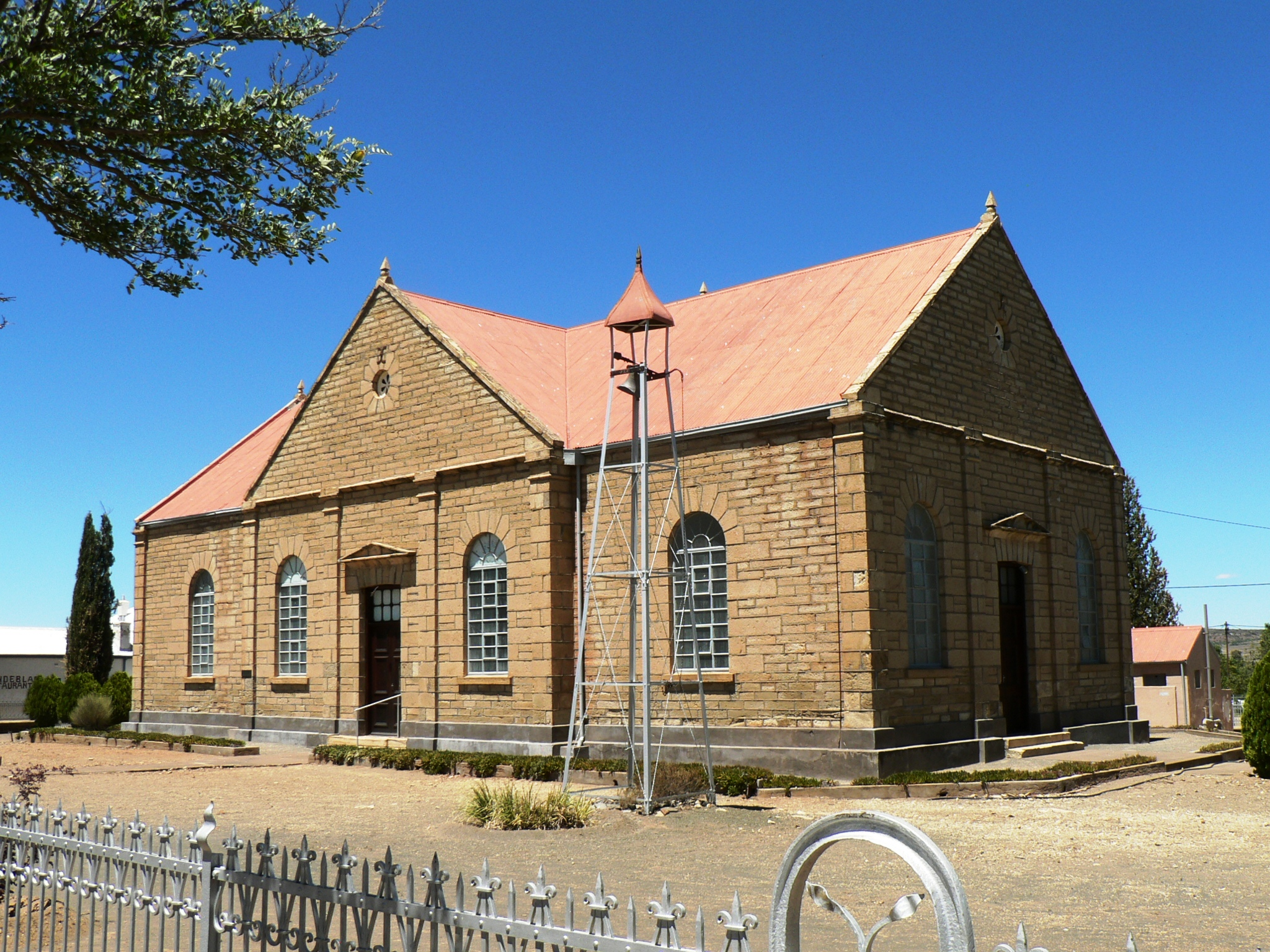
- Reformed Church, Philipstown

- Location within Northern Cape Location within South Africa
- Coordinates: 30°26′S 24°28′E
- Country: South Africa
- Province: Northern Cape
- District: Pixley ka Seme
- Municipality: Renosterberg

Area
  - Total: 44.12 km^{2} (17.03 sq mi)

Population (2011)
  - Total: 3,365
  - Density: 76.27/km^{2} (197.5/sq mi)

Racial makeup (2011)
  - Black African: 36.3%
  - Coloured: 58.5%
  - Indian/Asian: 0.4%
  - White: 4.5%
  - Other: 0.3%

First languages (2011)
  - Afrikaans: 70.2%
  - Xhosa: 27.0%
  - Other: 2.8%
- Time zone: UTC+2 (SAST)
- Postal code (street): 8795
- PO box: 8795

Philipstown is a town in the eastern Karoo region of South Africa.

Town 56 km north-east of De Aar. It was established in May 1863 on the farm Rietfontein and became a municipality in August 1876. Named after Sir Philip Wodehouse (1811–1887), Governor of the Cape Colony from 1861 to 1870.

At the jailhouse to the west of town is the building where a small force of the 65th Imperial Yeomanry and Native Police held off a large force of General De Wet's men during the Second Anglo-Boer War. During this action, Corporal William Sopp of the Imperial Yeomanry was awarded the Distinguished Conduct Medal for courage under fire when he rode out from this building to warn the approaching Australian Bushmen who were coming to relieve them that there were hundreds of Boers lying in wait for them. The Boers fired at this lone horseman as he raced to the Australians then raced back, arriving back at the jail without injury. This caused De Wet to delay his movements for several hours and turned him back towards a large pursuing British column.
