= Kuyasa Kids =

South African children's choir

The Kuyasa Kids is a choir in South Africa that tours the states to gather sponsors for orphans of the AIDS epidemic.

The band Switchfoot helped them to create a CD which is sold through their own independent label, lowercase people Records.

The choir consists of children from age 8 to as old as about 19. They are from the township of Kayamandi in Stellenbosch, which is about 40 minutes drive from Cape Town.

They tour the states with an organization called Horizon International, which sponsors children that are orphaned by HIV/AIDS.
