= Lowercase people =

See also the independent record label imprint of the same name, lowercase people records.

lowercase people is an organization that is divided into three major divisions: The lp Online Magazine, lp apparel, and the lowercase people Justice Fund. The organization was founded by the alternative rock band Switchfoot. In late October 2007, the band announced on their YouTube account page that they had created "lp records" to help further the vision of lowercase people.

The lp Online Magazine was started in 2005. It serves to bring attention to notable works created by artists, writers, and musicians, and to introduce social issues worldwide. The magazine is released quarterly. Lowercase people apparel gathers the works of artists. They are sold as shirts, prints, stickers, and buttons. All profits go towards the Lowercase people Justice Fund. In partnership with Geneva Global, the Lowercase people Justice Fund, a non-profit organization, uses the money gained from the shirts and prints sold to aid Third World communities.

An example is their involvement with the Kuyasa Kids, which is a choir in Africa that is made up of kids who were orphaned by HIV/AIDS. Switchfoot has helped them to create a CD which is also sold through Lowercase people. The proceeds will go towards the children's education. Jon Foreman also wrote "The Shadow Proves the Sunshine" in reaction to their work with the Kuyasa Kids. Lowercase people have also collected donations with The Salvation Army for Hurricane Katrina victims. Tim Foreman explains:

"As a rock band, we're not overly idealistic about single-handedly changing the world, but we do know that people are listening to what we have to say ... so we want to use what platform we have been given to make a difference."

"We are humanity: beautiful and broken. We want to collide. We're curious. We're thinking out loud. We are the lowercase people. Join us as we dream." -Chad Butler

== Issues ==
=== Issue 1 ===
Music:

- Feature: Switchfoot vs. Reeve Oliver
- Reviews: The Fray's How to Save a Life, Aloha's Here Comes Everyone, Common's Be, and The Futureheads' self-titled album
- Bands: Reeve Oliver

Art:

- Feature: Art As Play
- Fine Artists: Jeremey Wright
- Graphic Artists: Nessim Higson

Words:

- Feature: A Love Supreme: The Spiritual Life of John Coltrane
- Interview: David Dark and Chris Ahrens
- Regulars: Dark Matter: Are You Reality-Based?, and Reasonable Doubts: The Heart of Man
- Profiles: David Dark, Chris Ahrens, and Charlie Peacock

Justice:

- Feature: Out Of South Africa: Random Thoughts in flight
- Community: Kayamandi, South Africa
- The Lowercase people Justice Fund
- Get Involved: Kuyasa Kids' Live in Kayamandi CD

=== Issue 2 ===
Music:

- Feature: Ryan O'Neal and Ron Sexsmith
- Reviews: Circa Survive's Juturna, Richard Swift's The Novelist Secretly Canadian, Sufjan Stevens' Illinois Asthmatic Kitty, and The Rakes' Capture/Release
- Bands: Ron Sexsmith and Sleeping at Last

Art:

- Feature: Lain York and J Todd Greene
- Fine Artists: Lain York and J Todd Greene
- Graphic Artists: Jeff Kleinsmith

Words:

- Feature: Between Memory and Mobility
- Interview: George Plimpton and Ernest Hemingway
- Regulars: Dark Matter: Getting In on the Act or How to Never Feel Uncool Again, and Reasonable Doubts: The Sea Hags
- Profiles: Booker Browning, and Cameron Bird

Justice:

- Feature: Anonymous in India: A travelogue
- Community: India
- The Lowercase people Justice Fund
- Get Involved: Donations

=== Issue 3 ===
Music:

- Feature: A Conversation between Mutemath and Mae
- Reviews: Sharon Jones's Naturally, Willie Nile's Streets of New York, Jamie Lidell's Multiply, Cat Power's The Greatest, and Angels & Airwaves' We Don't Need to Whisper
- Bands: Mae and Mutemath

Art:

- Feature: A Conversation between Bobby Bailey and Jeremy Dean
- Fine Artists: Jeremy Dean and Bobby Bailey
- Graphic Artists: Bill Caywood

Words:

- Feature: Where Truth Meets Traction
- Interview: John Brown’s War on Terror
- Regulars: Dark Matter: Everybody to the Limit, and Reasonable Doubts: Dodo Does Hollywood
- Profiles: Won Kim

Justice:

- Feature: Four Days in New Rwanda
- Community: Rwanda, Africa
- The Lowercase people Justice Fund
- Get Involved: Buy A T-shirt, Donations, Reach Out (Invisible Children, Blood:Water Mission, International Justice Mission, Dalit Freedom Network)

== Trivia ==
- The name of the organization is taken from Switchfoot's song, Company Car, in the lines "Now I'm down, under the pavement/ Of Capital Hills and Lowercase people".
