= Makupula Secondary School =

Location
- Makupula Road, Kayamandi, 7600; Stellenbosch, Western Cape; South Africa
- Coordinates: 33.9176°S 18.8467°E

Information
- Type: Public
- Motto: Education Is Our Business
- Established: 2006; 20 years ago
- School district: Cape Winelands
- Principal: Mr. M.S Dotwana
- Teaching staff: 41
- Grades: 8–12
- Gender: Boys & Girls
- Age: 13 to 19
- Enrollment: over 1,000 pupils
- Language: Xhosa
- Schedule: 07:30 – 16:00
- Colours: Navy; White
- Nickname: Makups
- Accreditation: Western Cape Education Department

Makupula Secondary School (formerly Kayamandi Secondary School) is a Xhosa-medium school serving grades 8–12 located in Kayamandi, Stellenbosch, in the Western Cape region of South Africa. The Western Cape Education Department categorizes it as one of the purely Xhosa-speaking secondary schools in the region.

As of 2006 the school had more than 1,000 students.

== Academics ==
Learners from Makupula Secondary School write the NSC (National Senior Certificate) examination at the end of their matric year (grade 12). Grade 8–9 learners have the following compulsory subjects:

- Xhosa Home Language
- English First Additional Language
- Mathematics
- Natural Sciences
- Social Sciences
- Technology
- Creative Arts
- Life Orientation

In grade 10 learners have four compulsory subjects:

- Xhosa Home Language
- English First Additional Language
- Mathematics or Mathematical Literacy
- Life Orientation

Further more they can choose 3 or more of the following subjects:

NSC Subjects to choose from:
Business Studies
Accounting
History
Economics
Tourism
Computer Applications Technology

== Choir ==
Makupula Secondary School Choir has been around since the early years of the opening of the school, it is conducted by Ms A. Sesanti and it has won some national championships in the South African Schools Choral Eisteddfod(Sasce) nationals in the previous years.

In 2023, Makupula Secondary School Choir participated once again in the South African Schools Choral Eisteddfod 2023 Competition and proceeded to the nationals on 27 June 2023 to compete on four categories nationally.
