= Moederkerk, Stellenbosch =

Church in Stellenbosch, South Africa

Moederkerk Stellenbosch
- Nederduits Gereformeerde Kerk Stellenbosch
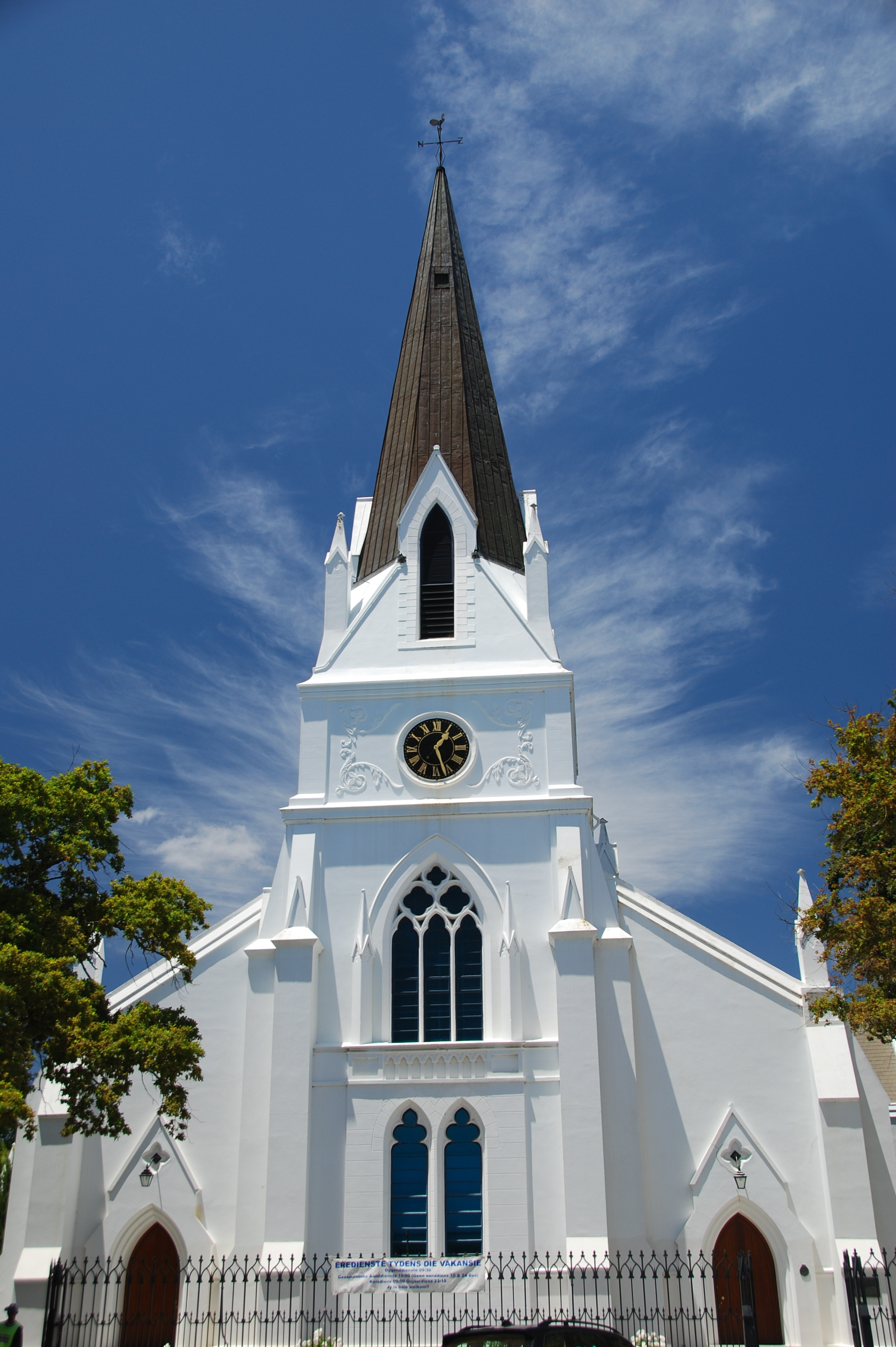
- Moederkerk Stellenbosch
- 33°56′16″S 18°51′51″E
- Country: South Africa
- Language: Afrikaans

History
- Founded: 1687
- Founder: Reverend Johannes Overney

Clergy
- Priest: Marié Britz

The Moederkerk (Mother Church) in Stellenbosch is the second oldest congregation of the Dutch Reformed Church in South Africa.

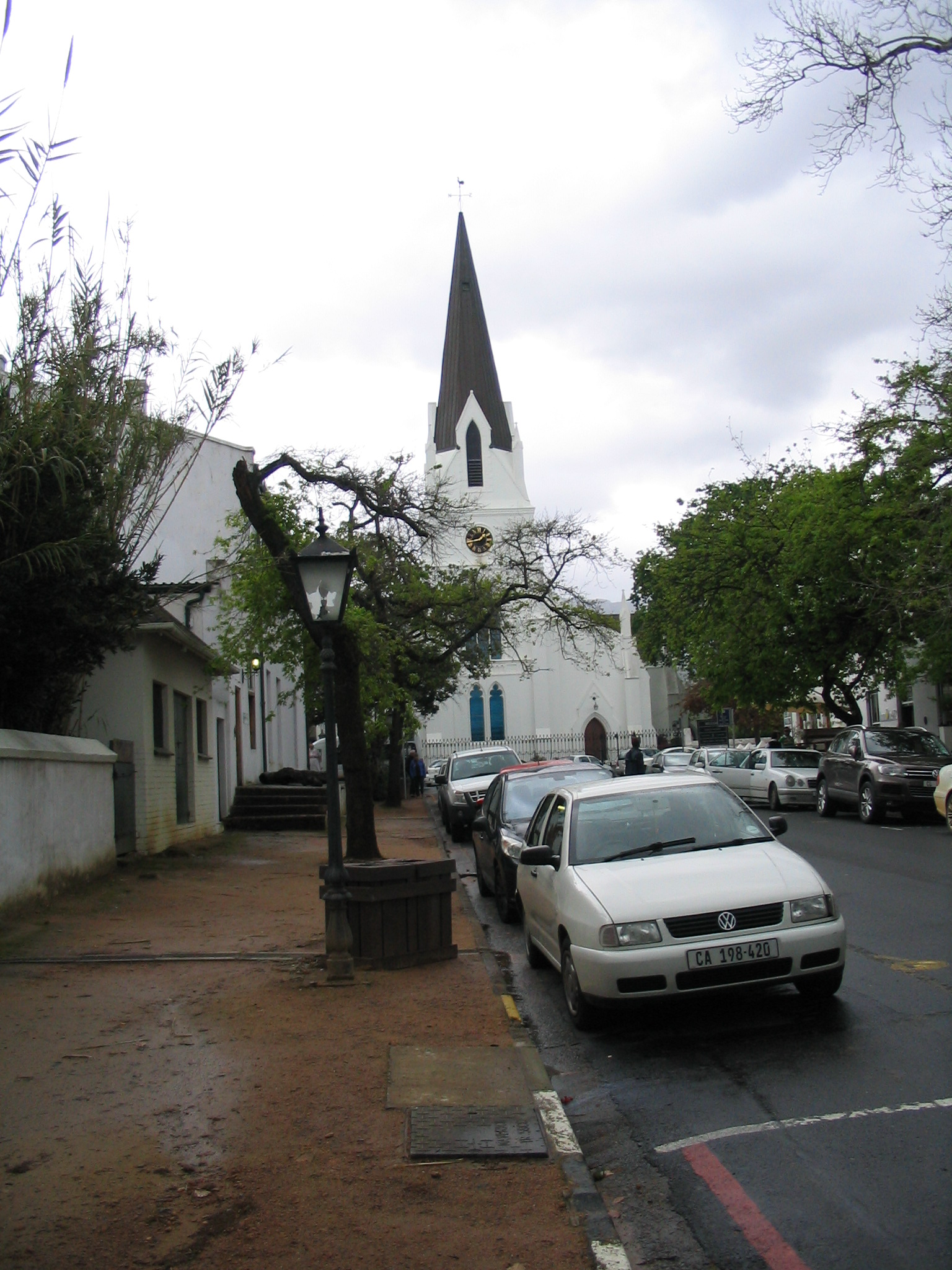

== Foundation ==
The congregation was founded, just 21 years after the Groote Kerk in Cape Town, by Rev. Johannes Overney who came from Cape Town to hold the first service "in one of the best situated and ablest Vrijmans Woningen" on Sunday 13 October 1686, on which occasion he preached on Isaiah 52:7: "Hoe lievelijk zijn op de bergen the feet of those who bring good tidings of peace; those who bring good tidings of good; those who say to Zion: Your God is King." In the afternoon he baptized three children. As a consultant, he visited the congregation every three months and in the meantime the services were observed by the sick roster Mankadan. In January 1687, the first church council was appointed, consisting of one elder and one deacon. The deacon was Dirk Coetzee.

The corner stone of the first building was laid in February 1687. Thanks to the lovely cooperation of the congregation and great help provided by Governor Simon van der Stel, by whom the town was laid out and after whom it was also named, this little church could already be opened on 19 October 1687 was inaugurated by Rev. Johannes van Andel from Cape Town. The text he preached on was Numbers 6:23–27. It was located in the present Church Street on the lot where the old Wium boarding house later stood, and in its vicinity several corpses were excavated during renovations, as it was customary at the time to bury people of any distinction inside the church. This faithful minister began with missions and education among the slaves and subjects, but he was not destined to attend the church's dedication, as he died on 5 May of that year, a victim of the fever (probably meaning malaria).

The first minute of the congregation that has been preserved, and which is quite possibly also the very first, is that of 15 October 1697. In the same year, Rev. Petrus Kalden from Cape Town reports to the Klassis van Amsterdam: "The congregation in Stellenbosch grows daily and now has over 50 members, to whom I go four times a year to administer the sacraments there, which during my absence by a sickness grid is observed so that this place becomes very significant over time, including all the years in suffering, to which the All-sufficient God wants to grant his grace and radiate us with his grace and favorable presence."

== Ministers ==
The congregation had eight ministers during the 18th century, but only three during the 19th century.

- Hercules of Loon, 1700 – 1704
- Henricus Beck, 1704 – 1726
- Solomon van Echten, 1732 – 1736
- William of Ghent, 1739 – 1744
- Eduardus Arentz, 1747 – 1749
- Johannes Appeldoorn, 1753 – 1772
- Philippus Kuys, 1778 – 1785
- Meent Borcherds, 1786 – 1832
- Tobias Johannes Herold, 1832 – 1857
- Johannes Henoch Neethling, 1858 – 1904
- Daniel Stephanus Botha, 1904 – 1927
- Dr. Tobie Muller, 1913 – 1916, assistant preacher (students)
- Dr. Gustav Bernhard August Gerdener, 1917 – 1920 (second pastor)
- Jacobus Stephanus Gericke, 1946 – 1959 (after which first teacher of Stellenbosch Central)
- Zacharias Blomerus Loots, 1947 – 1951
- Theunis Christoffel Botha Stofberg, 1947 – 1964
- Dr. Willem Stephanus (Willie) Conradie, 1948 – 1954
- Anthonie Georg Eliab van Velden, 1951 – 1953 (after which first pastor of Stellenbosch West)
- Adriaan Jacobus van Wijk, 1958 – 1976
- Dr. Evert Philippus Jacobus Kleynhans, 1965 – 1969
- Tobias Johannes de Clerq, 1970 – November 1989 (accepts his emeritus)
- Willem Jacob Benjamin Serfontein, 1970 – 1983
- Frederick Johannes Conradie, 1973 – 23 April 1989 (accepts his emeritus)
- Dr. Johannes van Schalkwyk, 1985 – 1988 (came here from and left again for Lynnwoodrif)
- Johannes Jochemus Eucharistius Koornhof, 1991 – 2014 (accepts his emeritus)
- Marié Britz, 2000–present
- Prof. Cas Wepener, 29 November 2020–present (assignment Theological Training),
