= Stellenbosch Synagogue =

Jewish religious building in Stellenbosch, South Africa

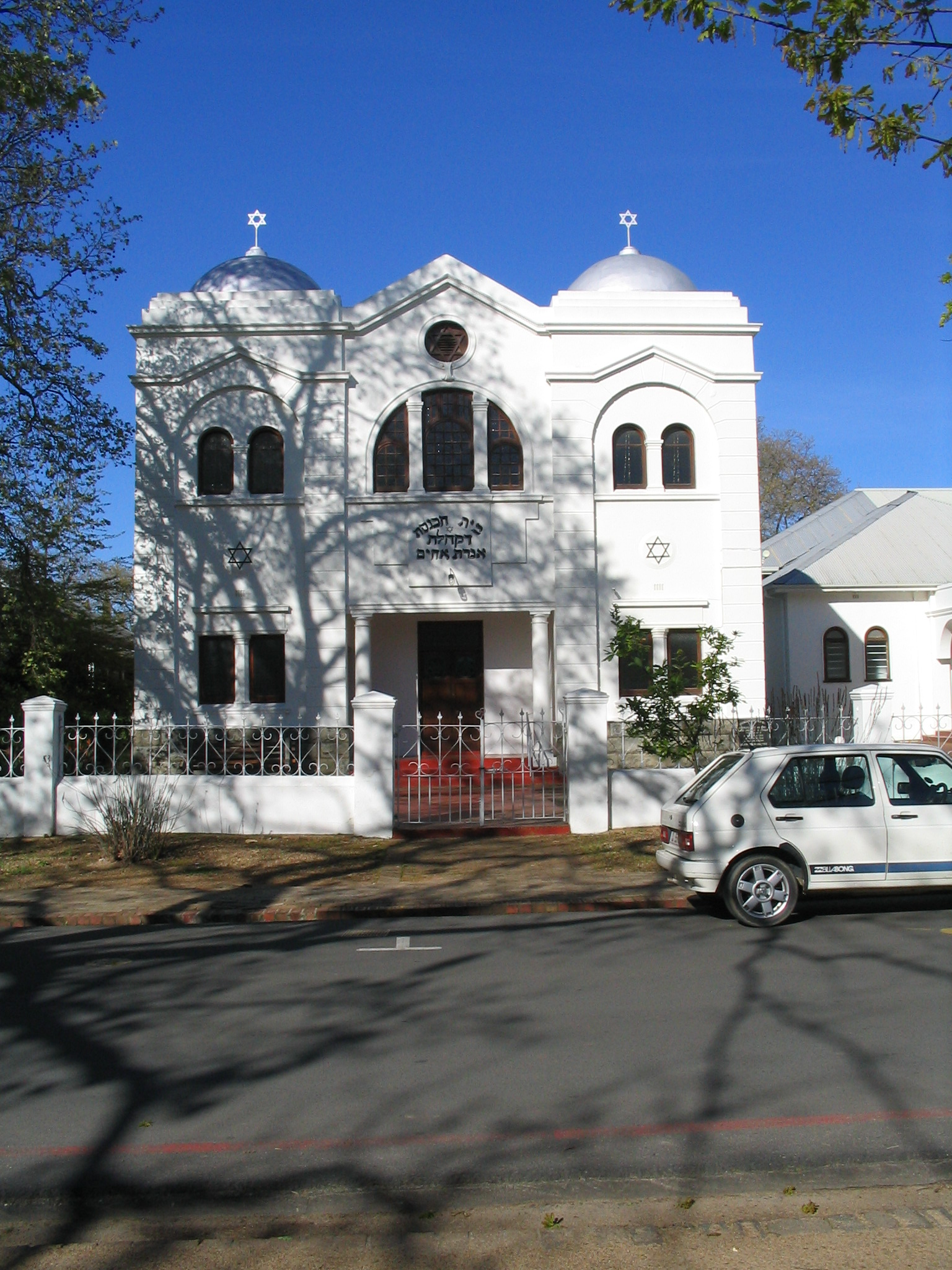
- Stellenbosch Synagogue, in 2013

- Location of the synagogue in the Western Cape region

Religion
- Affiliation: Orthodox Judaism
- Rite: Nusach Ashkenaz
- Ecclesiastical or organizational status: Synagogue
- Ownership: Stellenbosch Hebrew Congregation
- Leadership: Lay-led
- Status: Active

Location
- Location: 44 Ryneveld Street, Stellenbosch, Western Cape
- Country: South Africa
- Interactive map of Stellenbosch Synagogue
- Coordinates: 33°56′08″S 18°51′47″E

Architecture
- Type: Synagogue architecture
- Established: 1900 (as a congregation)
- Completed: 1923 (hall:1932)

The Stellenbosch Synagogue, formally the Stellenbosch Hebrew Congregation, is an Orthodox Jewish congregation and synagogue, located at 44 Ryneveld Street, in Stellenbosch, in the Western Cape region of South Africa. The congregation was established in 1900 and moved into its current building in 1923.

== History ==
The congregation dates from 1900 and was then known as the Agudat Achim Hebrew Congregation, with Rev Zeidel as its first lay leader. Membership numbered 40 at its inception, yet increased as Jewish refugees arrived during the Second Boer War. Services were held at a private home before a house in Bird Street was rented exclusively for the congregation and a mikvah built on-site. Rev A. P. Bender, spiritual leader of Gardens Shul, consecrated the house as a synagogue in 1903. In 1905, the president of the synagogue and other senior members addressed the congregation to lament the pogroms in the Russian Empire and appealed to the mayor of Stellenbosch to garner local support for the victims.

The congregation decided to build its own purpose-built synagogue and purchased a stand. Rev Bender lay the foundation station in 1923 in a ceremony attended by the town's mayor, Dutch Reformed Church minister and a local magistrate. The new building served the spiritual needs of the 23 Jewish families living in the town at the time. In 1932 the congregation built a communal hall. The congregation also operated a Hebrew School. In 1950, Israel Brodie, Chief Rabbi of Great Britain and the Commonwealth attended a special jubilee celebration at the synagogue.

The synagogue is operational, with Friday night shabbat and other Jewish holiday services being held. As well as serving resident Jewish families, it serves Jewish students at Stellenbosch University. Students are also served by Chabad on Campus. Between 2019 and 2024, the number of Jewish students has increased from 40 to more than 150. In response, Rabbi Chananyah Duthie became the Stellenbosch University Chabad on Campus rabbi in 2024.

Since inception, the congregation has been led by lay clergy.

== Gallery ==
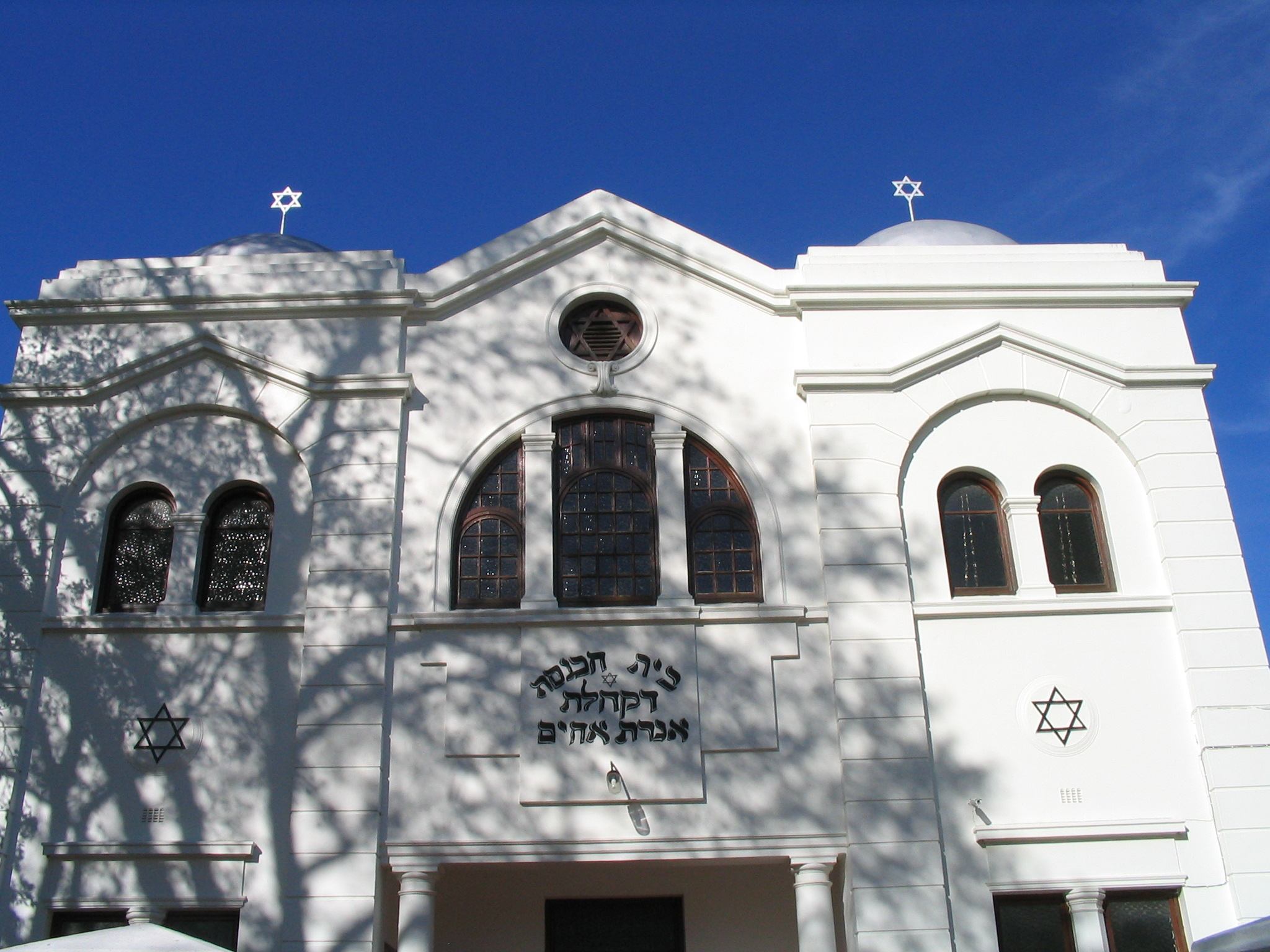
Stellenbosch Synagogue

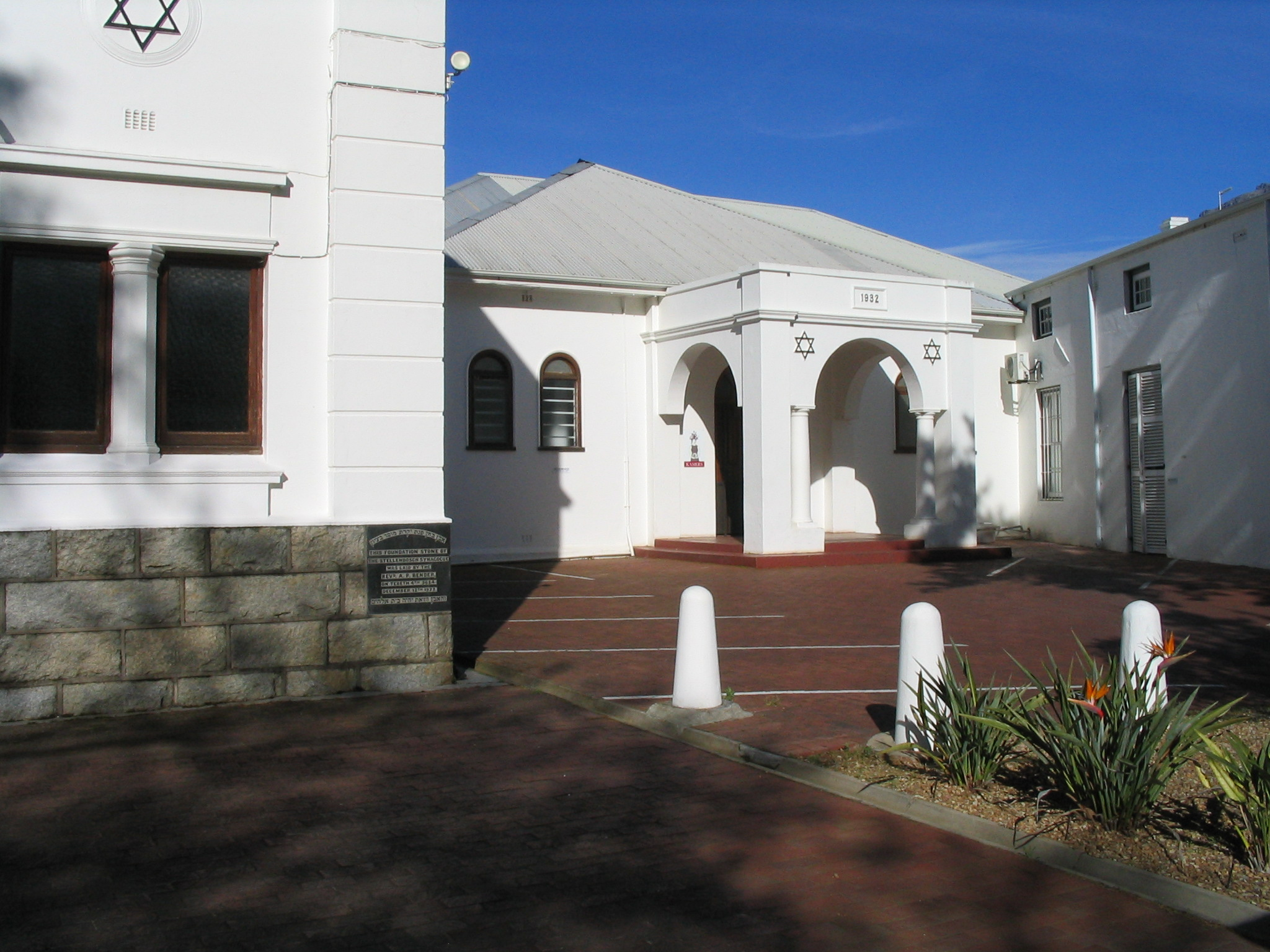
Communal hall

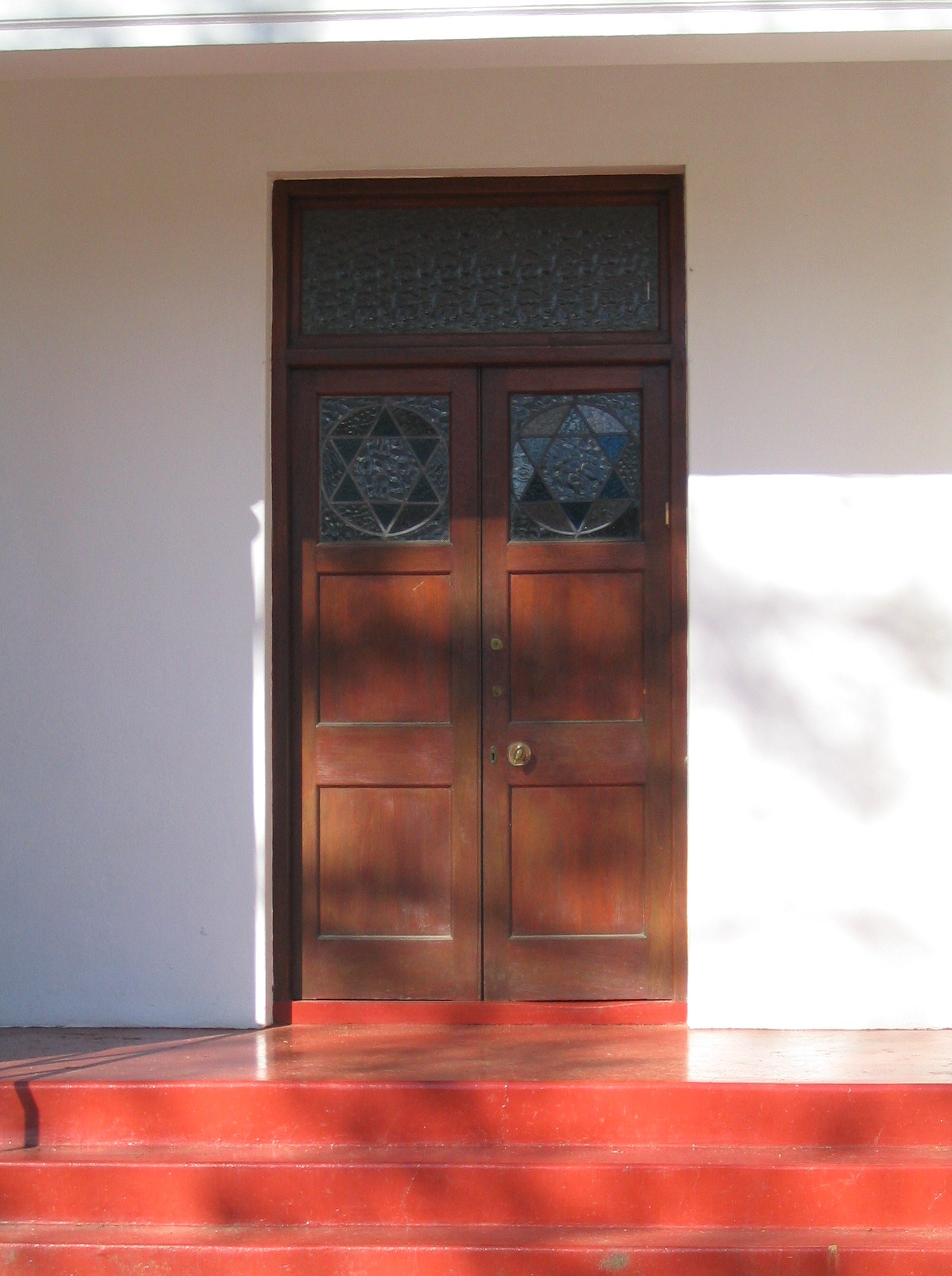
Front doors of the synagogue

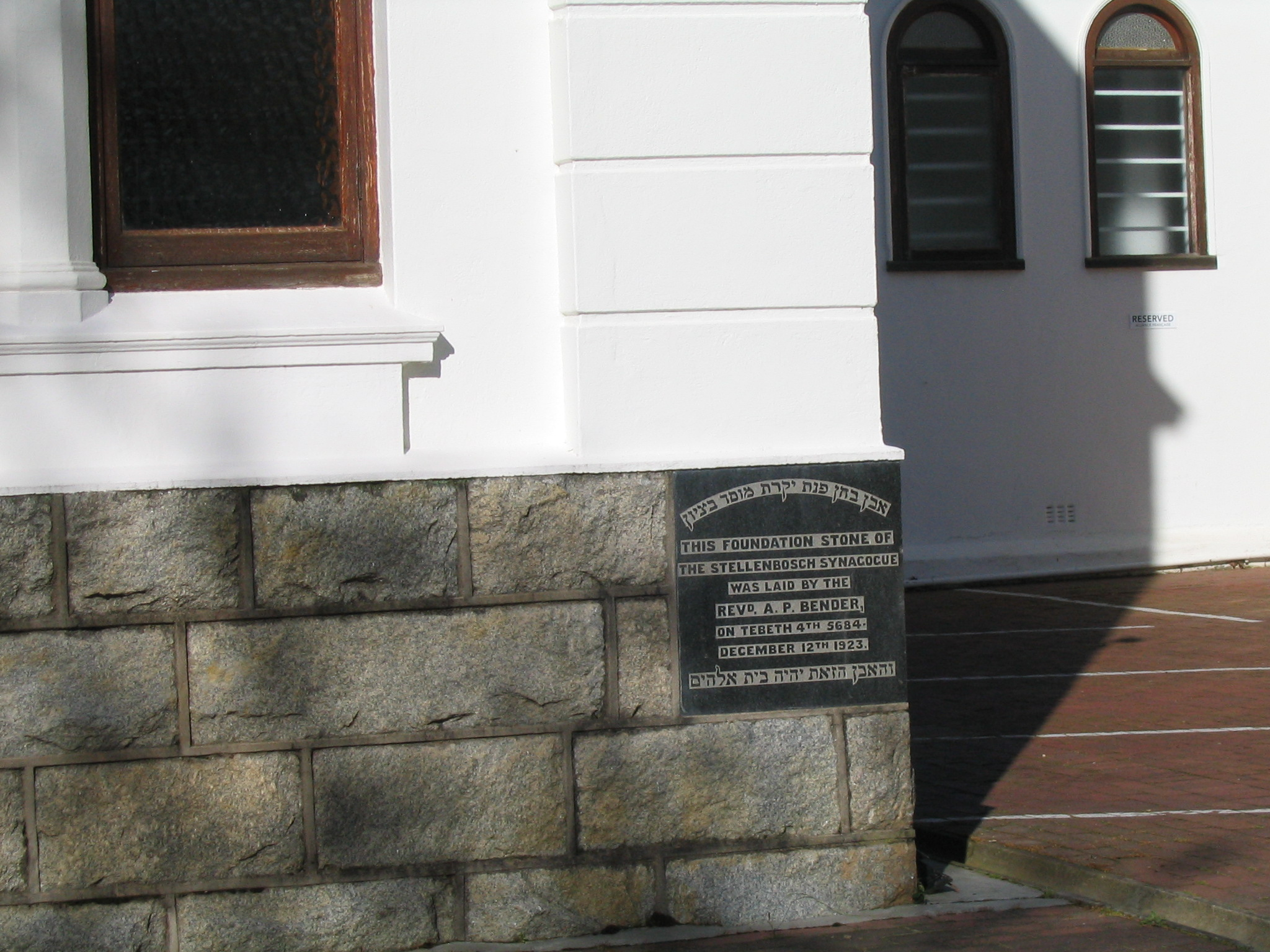
Foundation stone

== See also ==
- History of the Jews in South Africa
- List of synagogues in South Africa
