= Oom Samie se Winkel =

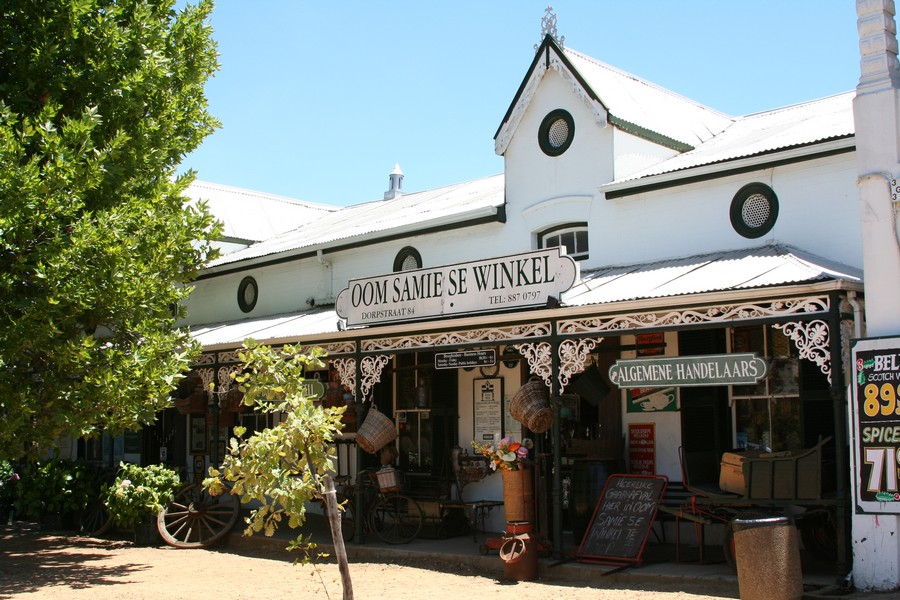
- The front façade of the store
- Interactive map of the Oom Samie se Winkel area

General information
- Architectural style: Victorian
- Location: 84 Dorp Street, Stellenbosch, South Africa
- Coordinates: 33°56′22″S 18°51′20″E
- Year built: 1904
- Owner: Annatjie Melck

Oom Samie se Winkel (Afrikaans for Uncle Samie's Shop) is a tourist attraction and one of the oldest surviving shops in Stellenbosch, South Africa. It is a known general dealer in Dorp street and is famous for operating almost in exactly the same way as it did in the Victorian era. The store was established in 1904 by Samuel Hannes (or Johannes) Volsteedt, who later became known as "Oom Samie", as a general dealer in Stellenbosch. The shop still sells traditional ingredients such as bokkoms, sour fig jam, honey, chest sugar, offal, sheepheads and Rooibos tea.

== History ==
The Volsteedt family bought the shop in 1904 for their son, Samuel Volsteedt, who was born in 1879. Samuel had a weak back and was therefore unsuited to do work on their farm. Samuel later began trading as SJ Volsteedt Algemene Handelaar and later became known as ''Oom Samie''.

Oom Samie operated the shop until his death in 1944 and was buried in the Stellenbosch Cemetery.

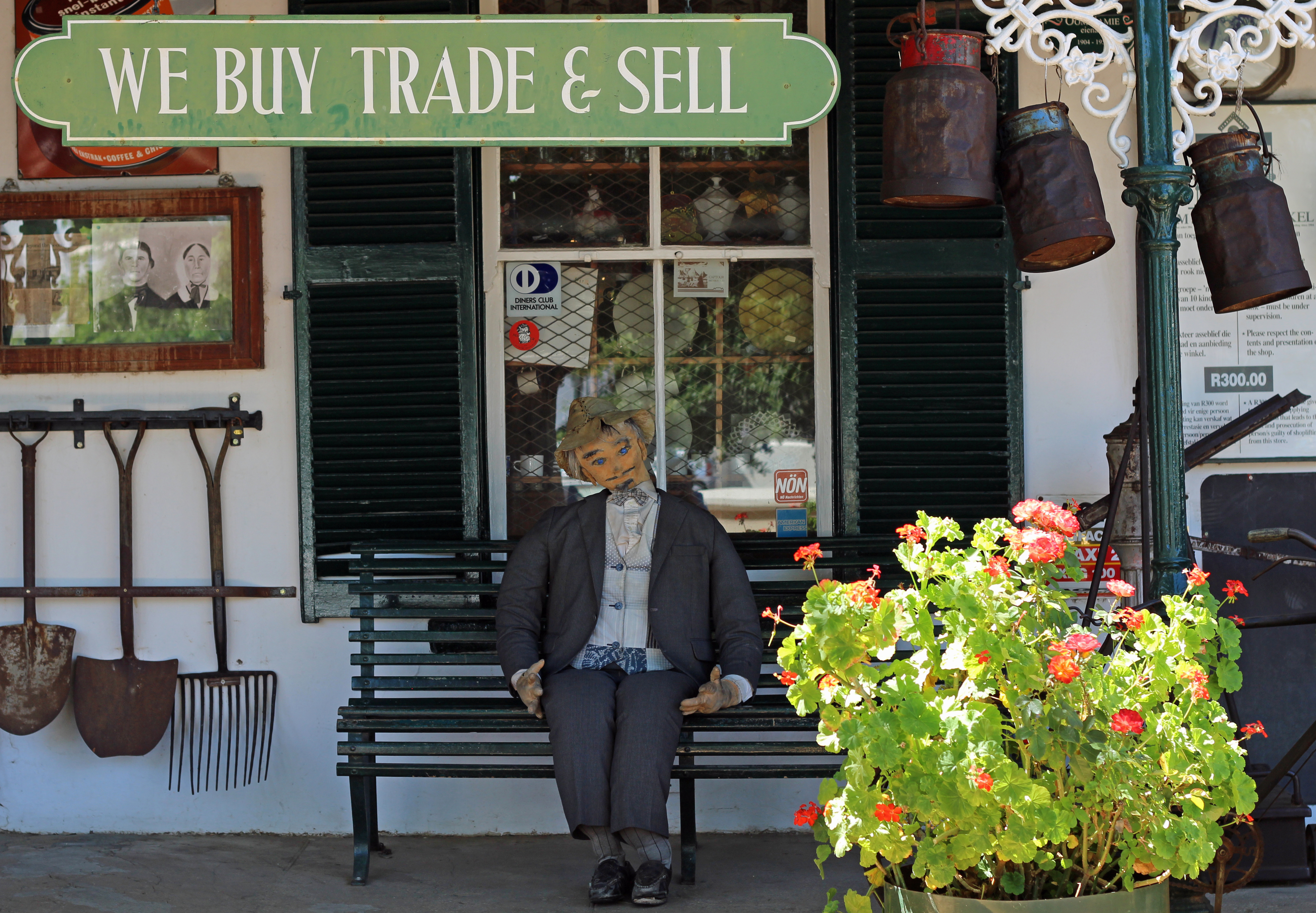
A dummy, representing Oom Samie, usually sits outside of the shop.
