= Stellenbosch =

Town in Western Cape, South Africa

Stellenbosch Eikestad
- Town
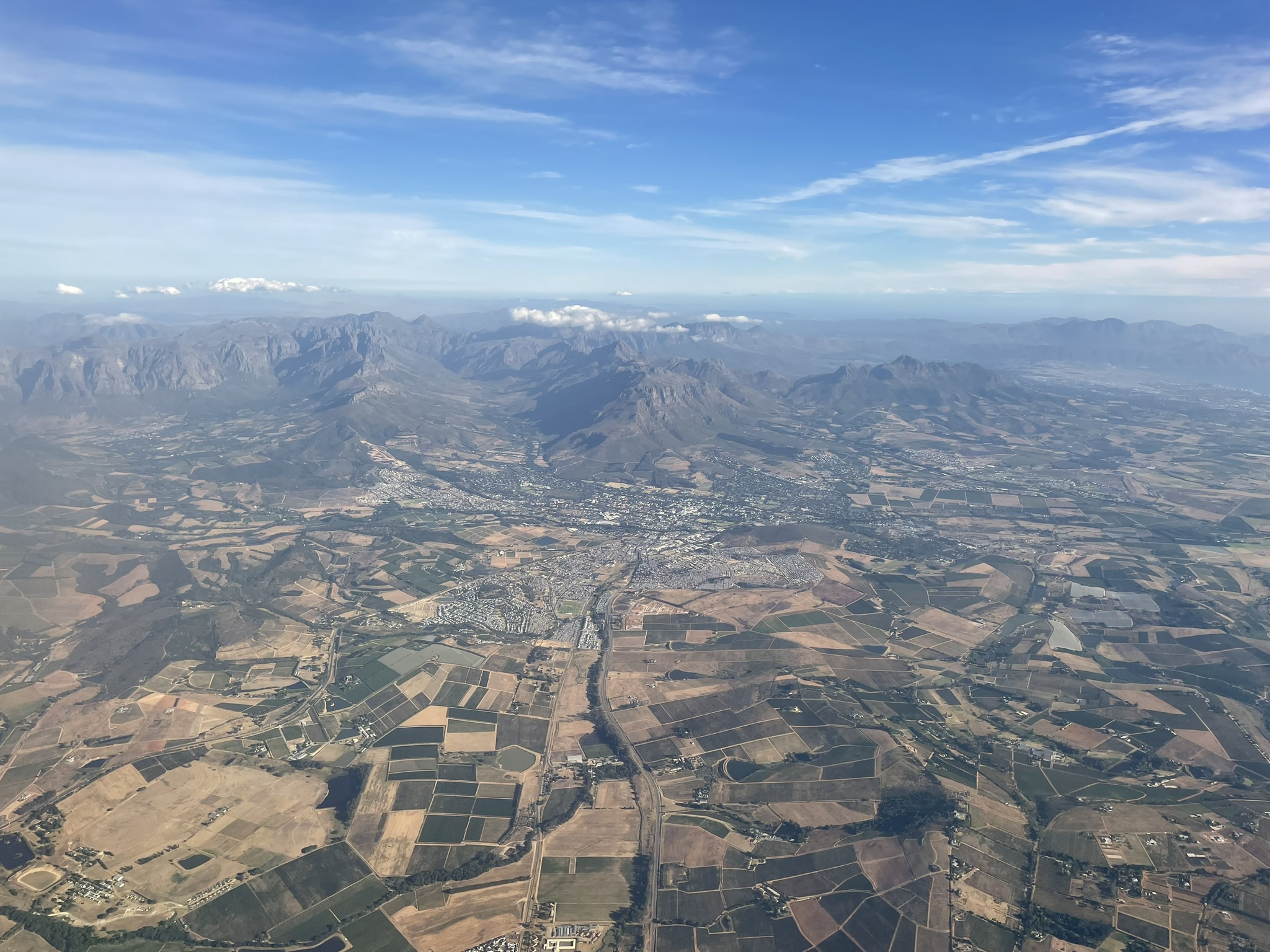
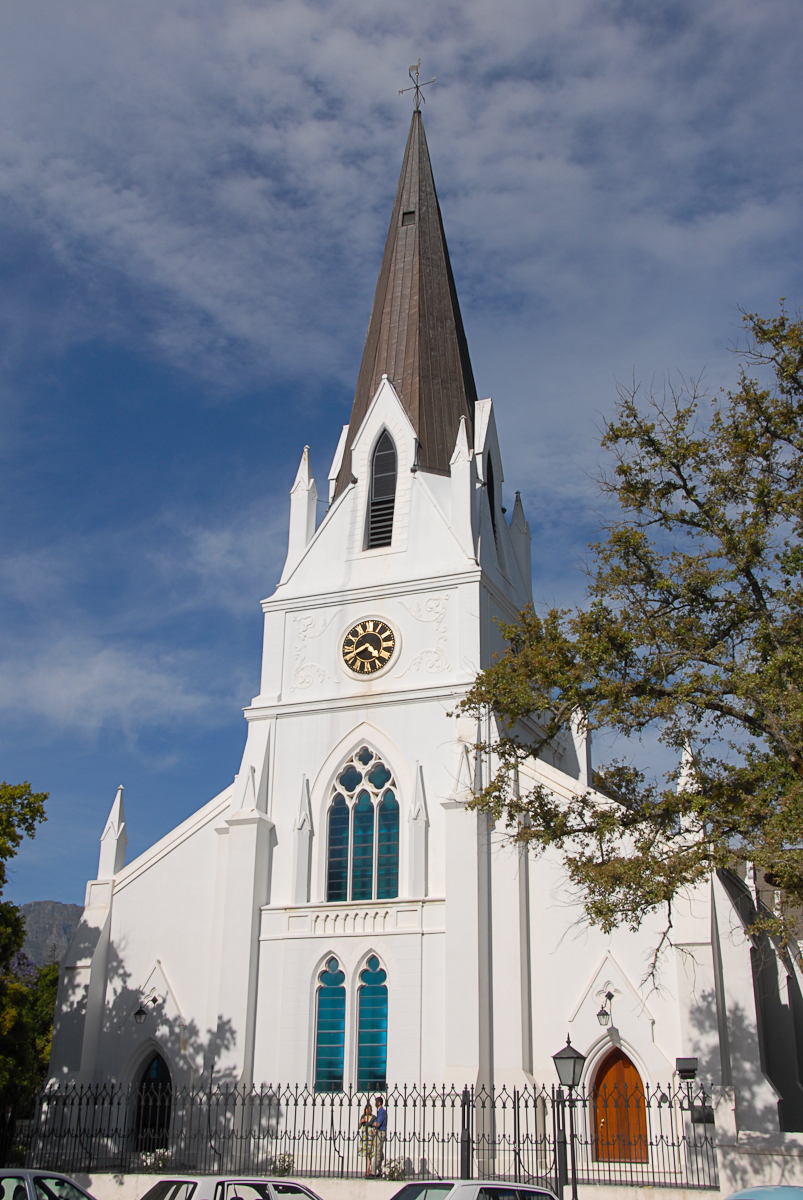
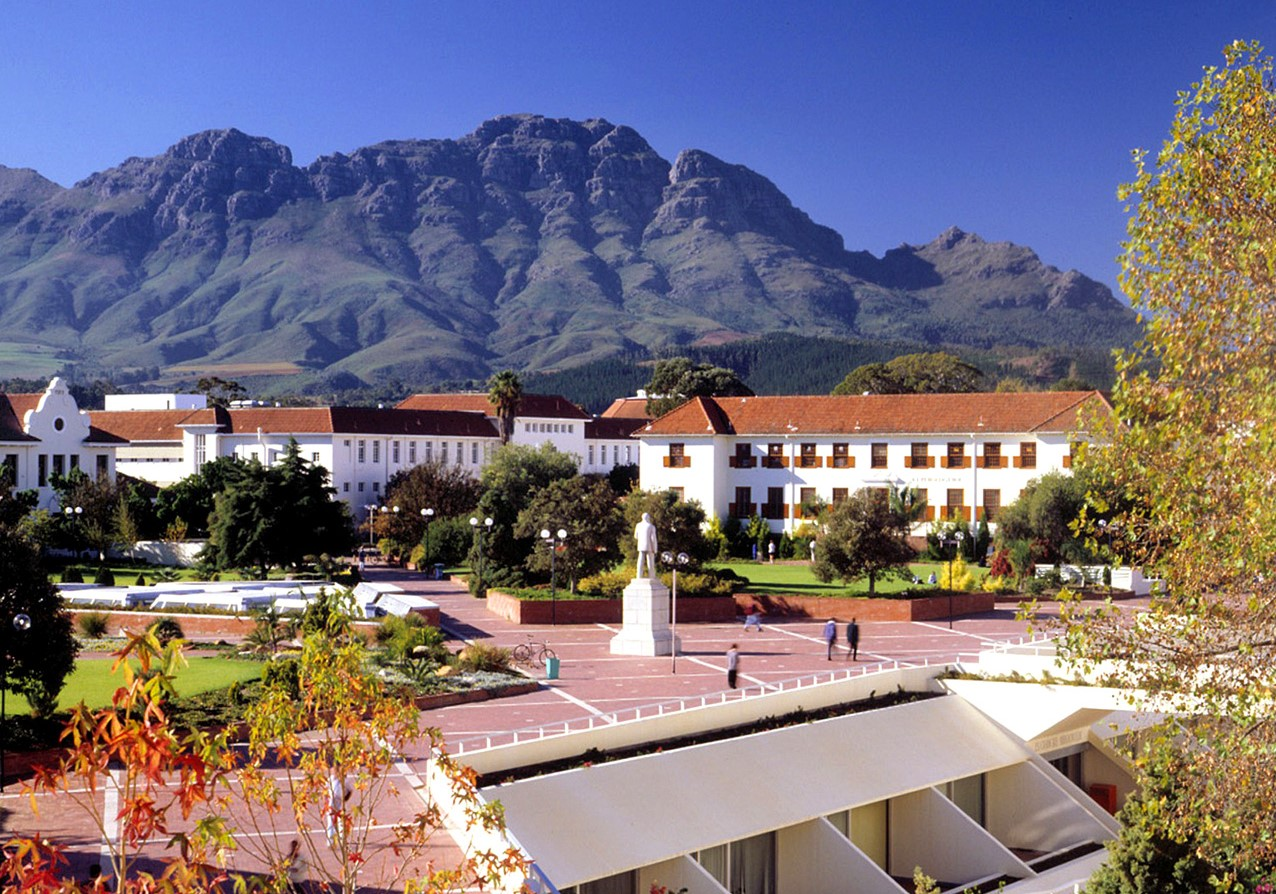
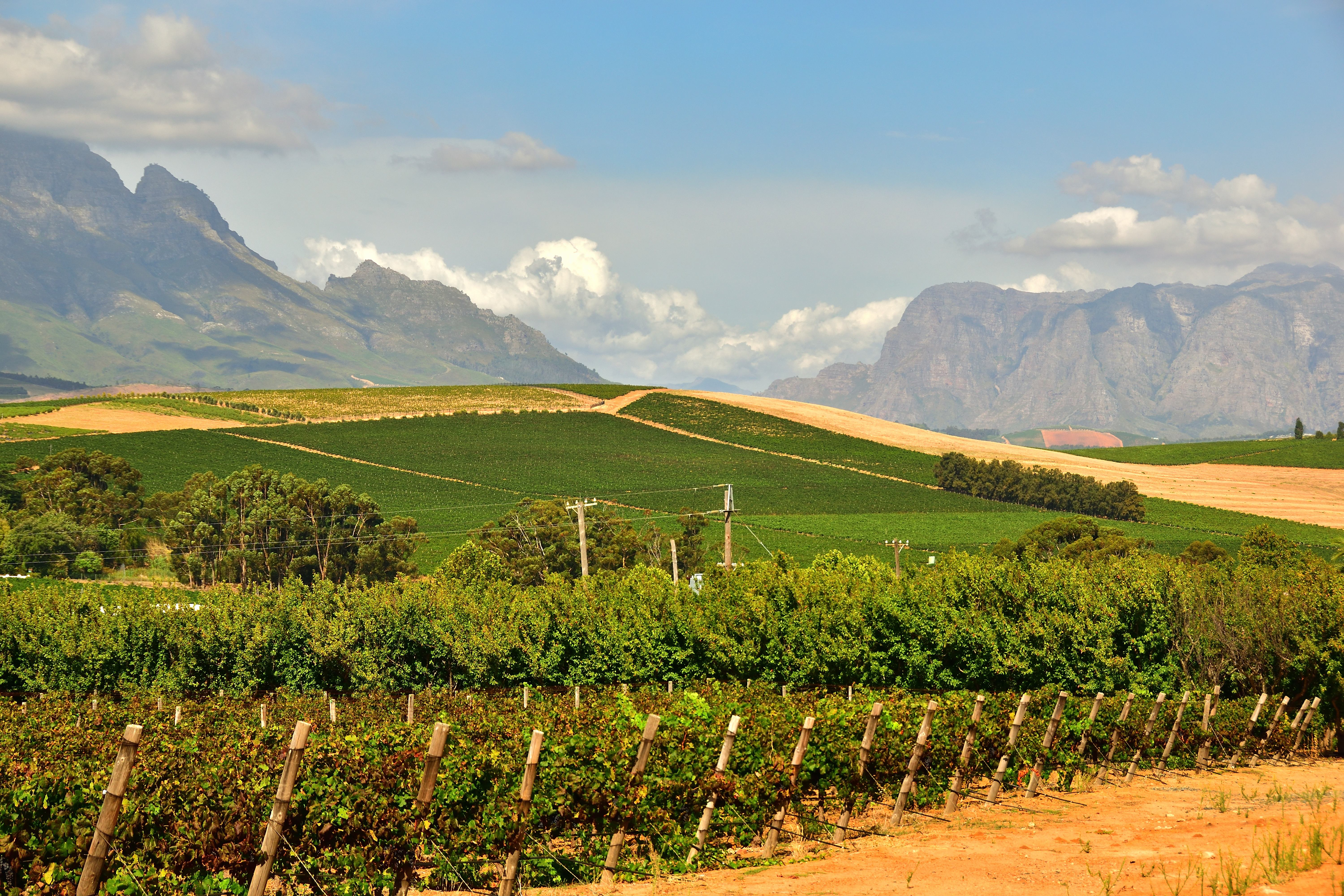
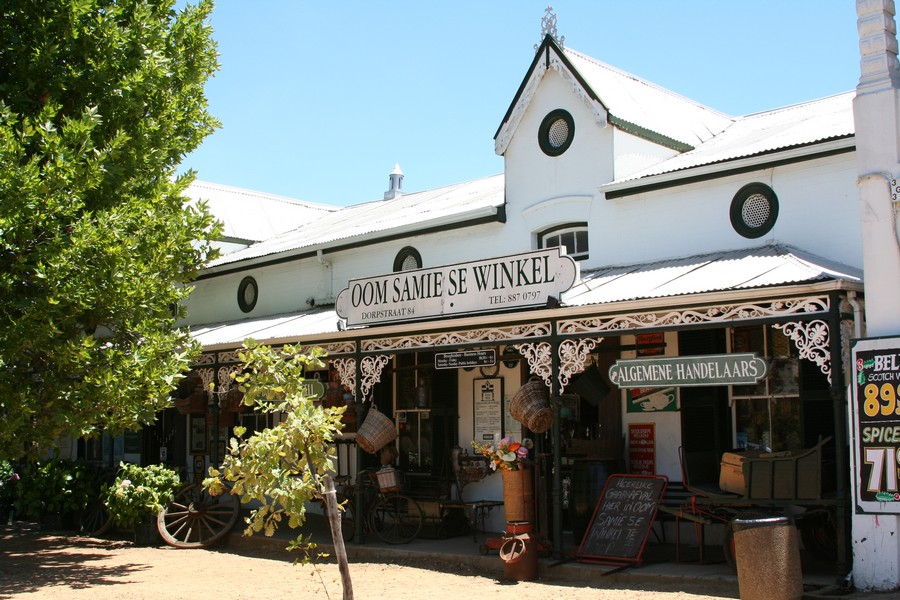
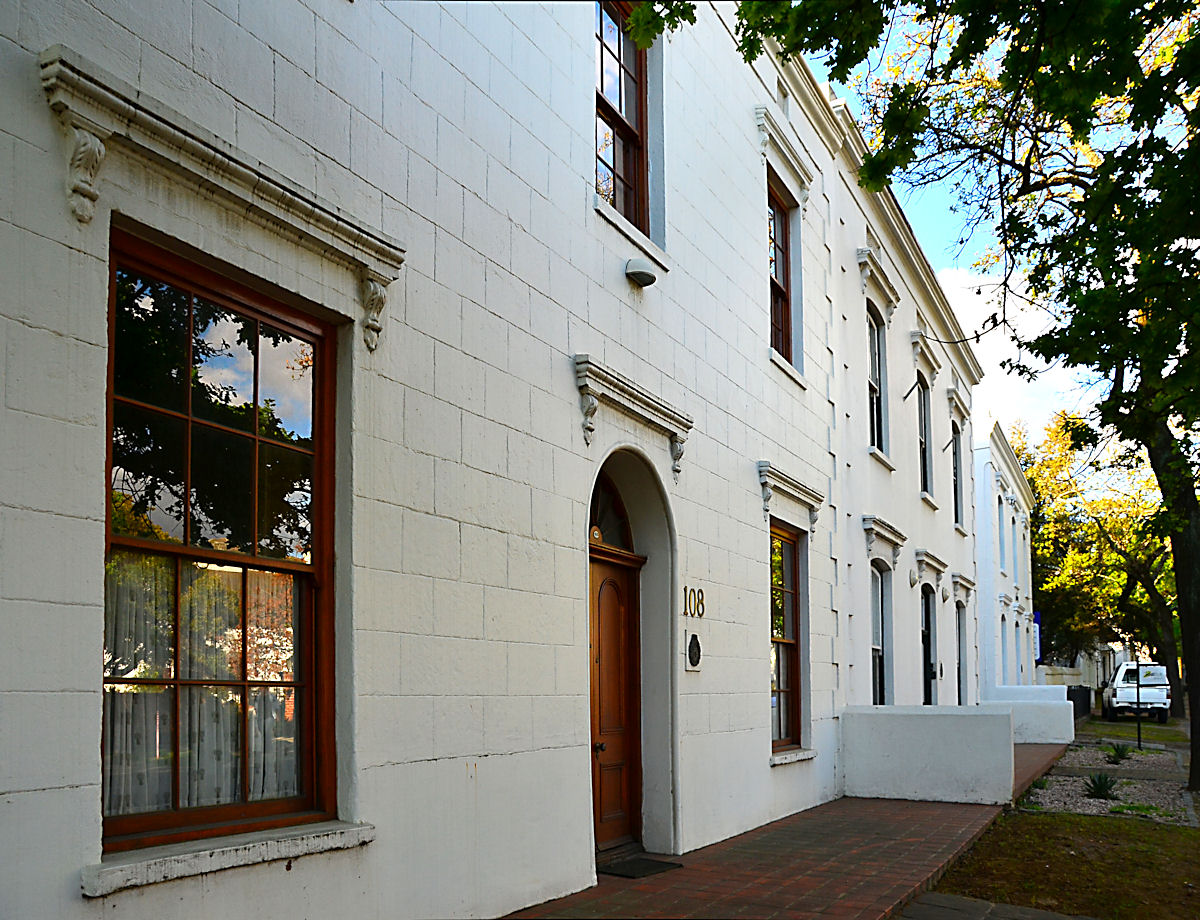
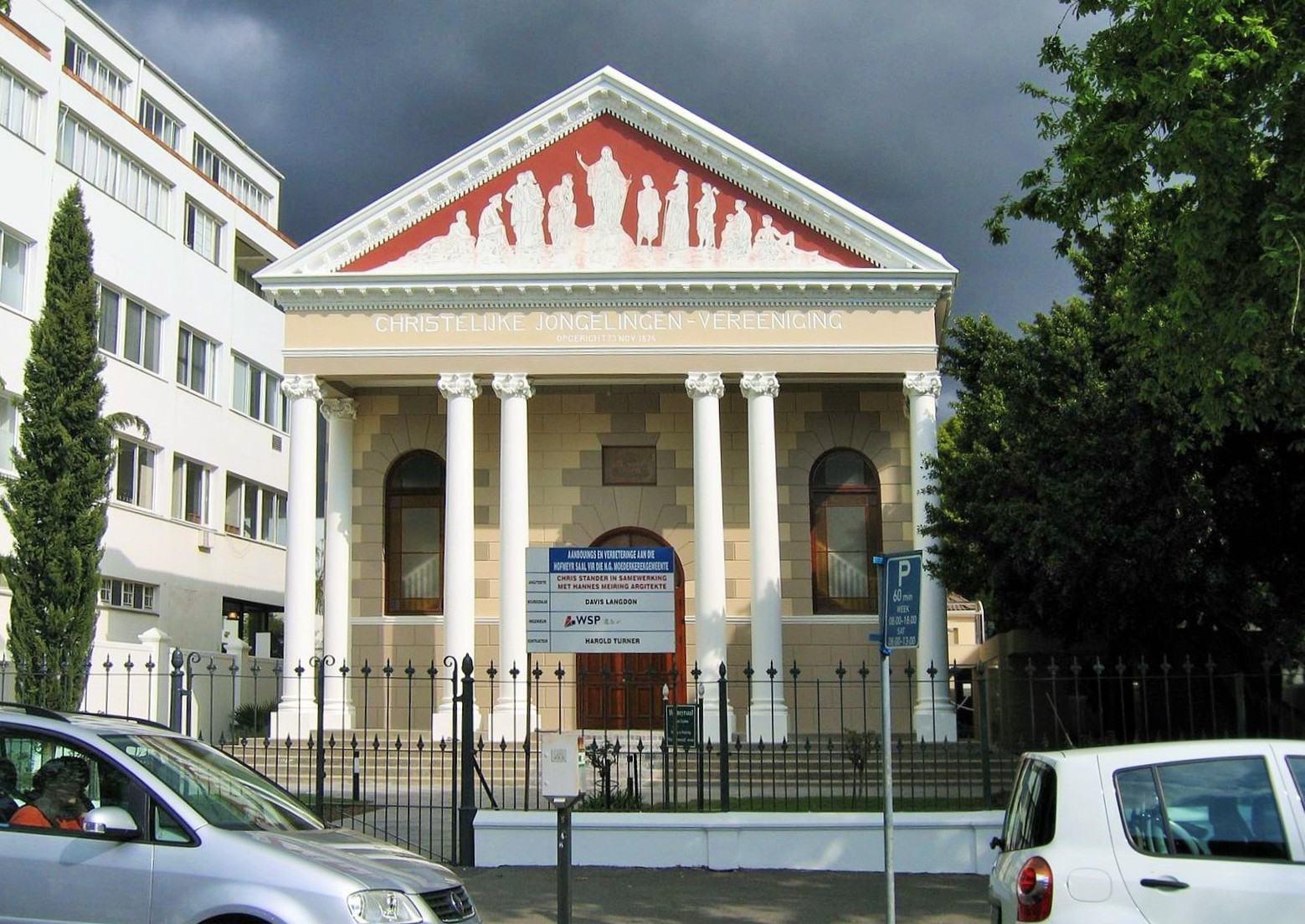
- Aerial view of Stellenbosch Moederkerk Stellenbosch University Vineyards Oom Samie se Winkel Dorp Street Hofmeyr Hall

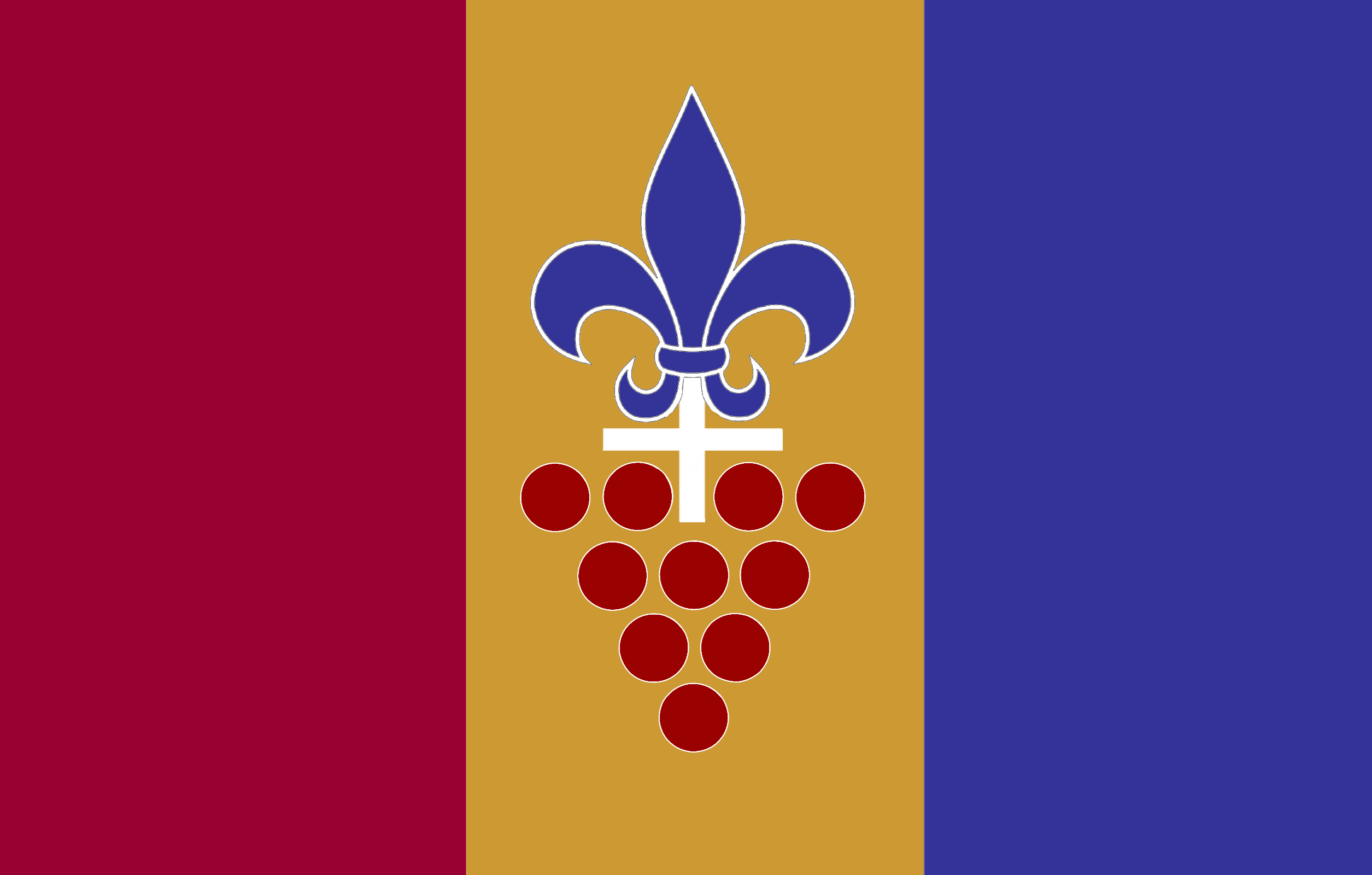
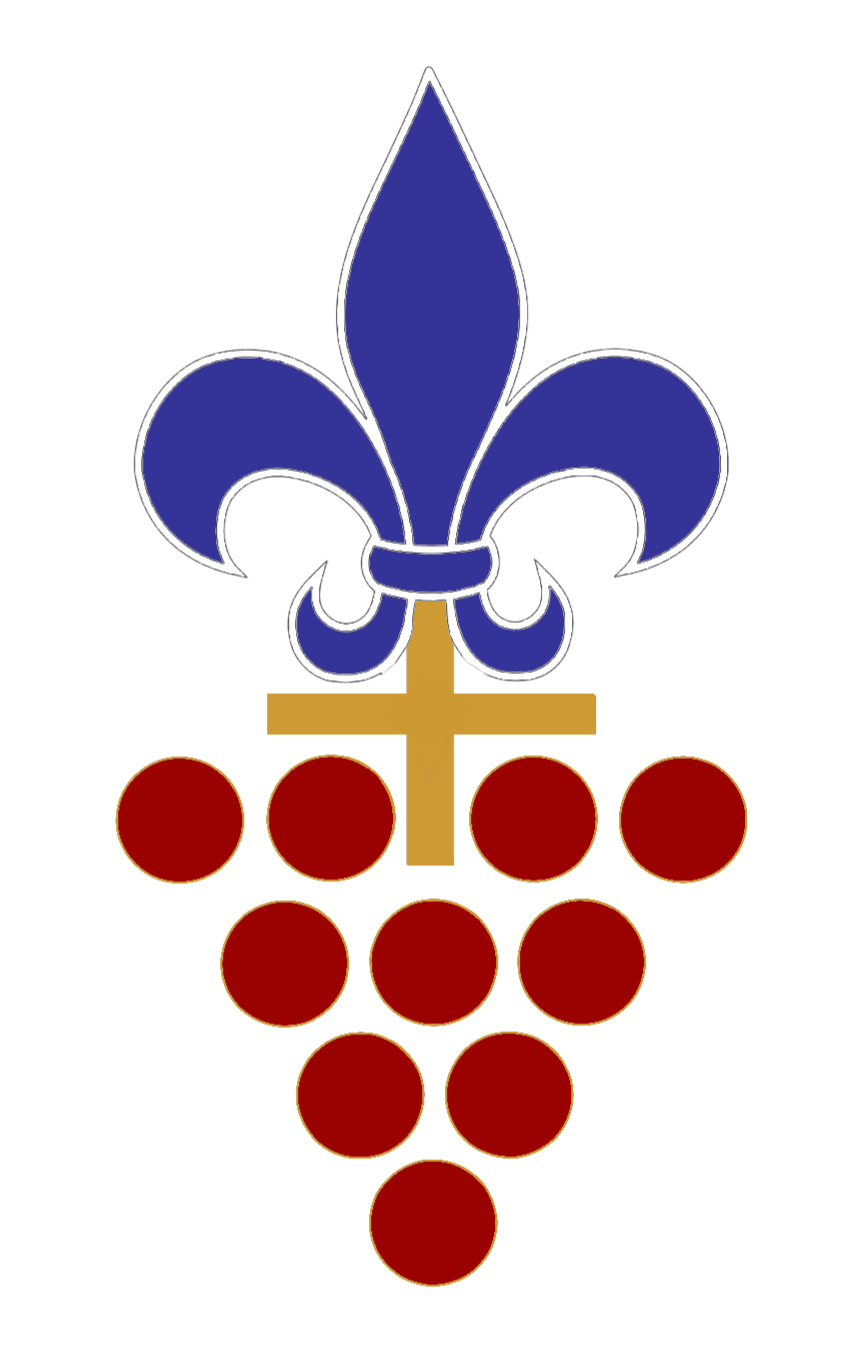
- Flag Coat of arms
- Nickname: Eikestad ("City of Oaks")
- Motto: Fortis Et Superbus (Latin: Strong and Proud)
- Location within Western Cape Location within South Africa Location within Africa
- Coordinates: 33°56′12″S 18°51′41″E
- Country: South Africa
- Province: Western Cape
- District: Cape Winelands
- Municipality: Stellenbosch
- Established: 1679; 344 years ago

Area
  - Total: 10.12 km^{2} (3.91 sq mi)
- Elevation: 136 m (446 ft)

Population (2011)
  - Total: 77,476
  - Density: 7,656/km^{2} (19,830/sq mi)

Racial makeup (2011)
  - White: 66.6%
  - Coloured: 15.8%
  - Black African: 15.0%
  - Indian/Asian: 0.9%
  - Other: 1.7%

First languages (2011)
  - Afrikaans: 70.4%
  - English: 20.8%
  - Xhosa: 1.8%
  - Other: 7.0%
- Time zone: UTC+2 (SAST)
- Postal code (street): 7600
- PO box: 7599
- Area code: 021
- Website: stellenbosch.gov.za

Stellenbosch (/ˈstɛlənbɒs/; Afrikaans: [ˈstælənˌbɔs]) is a town in the Western Cape province of South Africa, situated about 50 kilometres (31 miles) east of Cape Town, along the banks of the Eerste River at the foot of the Stellenbosch Mountain. The town became known as the City of Oaks or Eikestad in Afrikaans and Dutch due to the large number of oak trees that were planted by its founder, Simon van der Stel, to grace the streets and homesteads.

Stellenbosch is a popular tourist destination due to its history as the second oldest town in South Africa (dating back to 1679), its many historic buildings that are typical of Cape Dutch architecture, its location in the centre of many famous wine farms, and its variety of cafes, restaurants, boutiques and art galleries. The town is home to Stellenbosch University, one of South Africa's oldest universities, whose campus and buildings occupies large swathes of the town centre. Technopark Stellenbosch, a science park, is situated on the southern side of the town, and serves as a base for many large companies and startups, including Capitec Bank (South Africa's second largest retail bank).

Stellenbosch has its own municipality (incorporating the neighbouring towns of Pniel and Franschhoek), adjoining the metropolitan area of the City of Cape Town.

== History ==
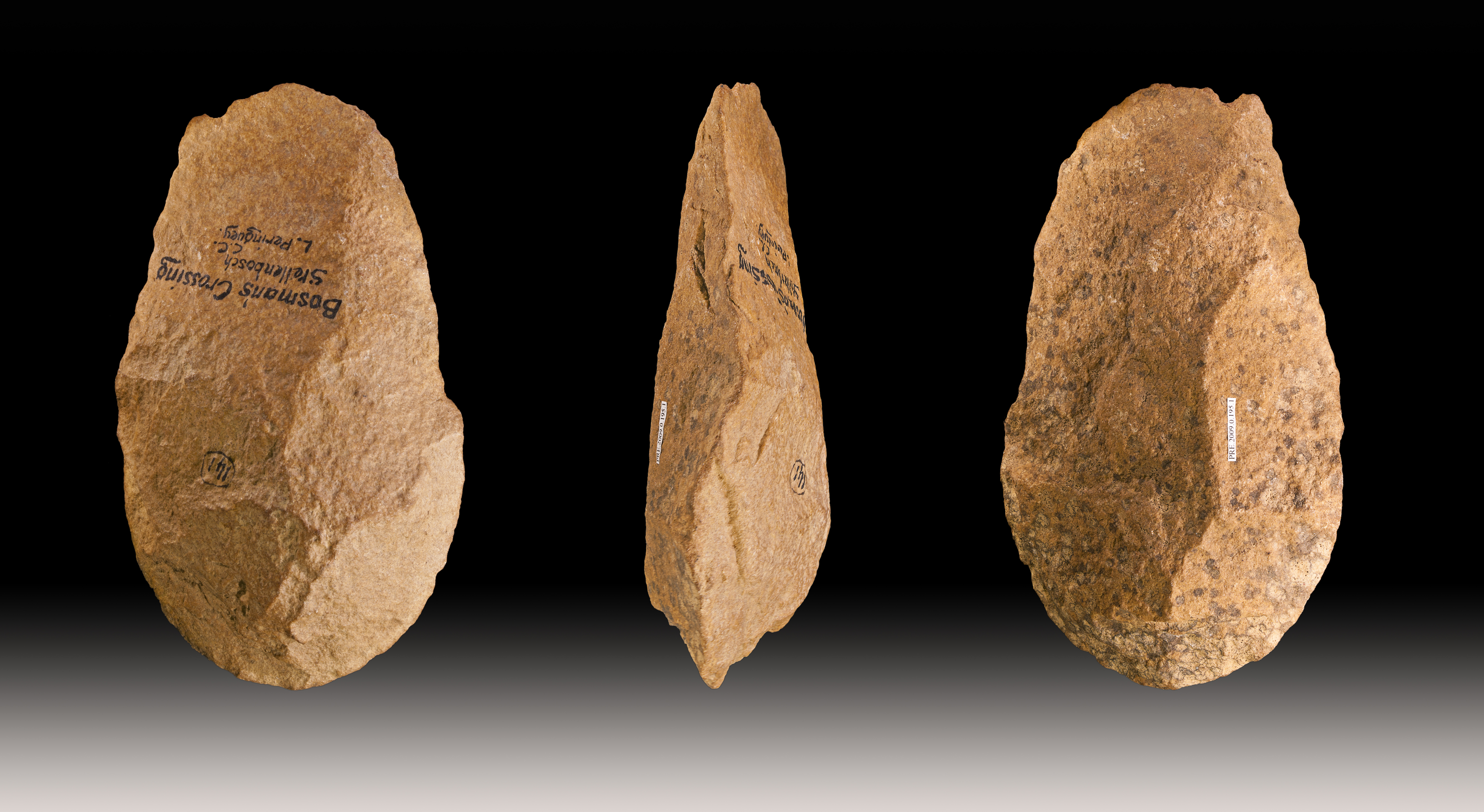
Paleolithic biface from Stellenbosch

=== Pre-history ===
In 1899, Louis Péringuey discovered Paleolithic stone tools of the Acheulean type at a site named Bosman's Crossing near the Adam Tas Bridge at the western entrance to Stellenbosch. This indicates that human habitation of the area dates as far back as 1 million years. By 10,000 to 20,000 years ago, the population, assumed to have been ancestors of the San people, were established in the area.

=== Founding and early history ===
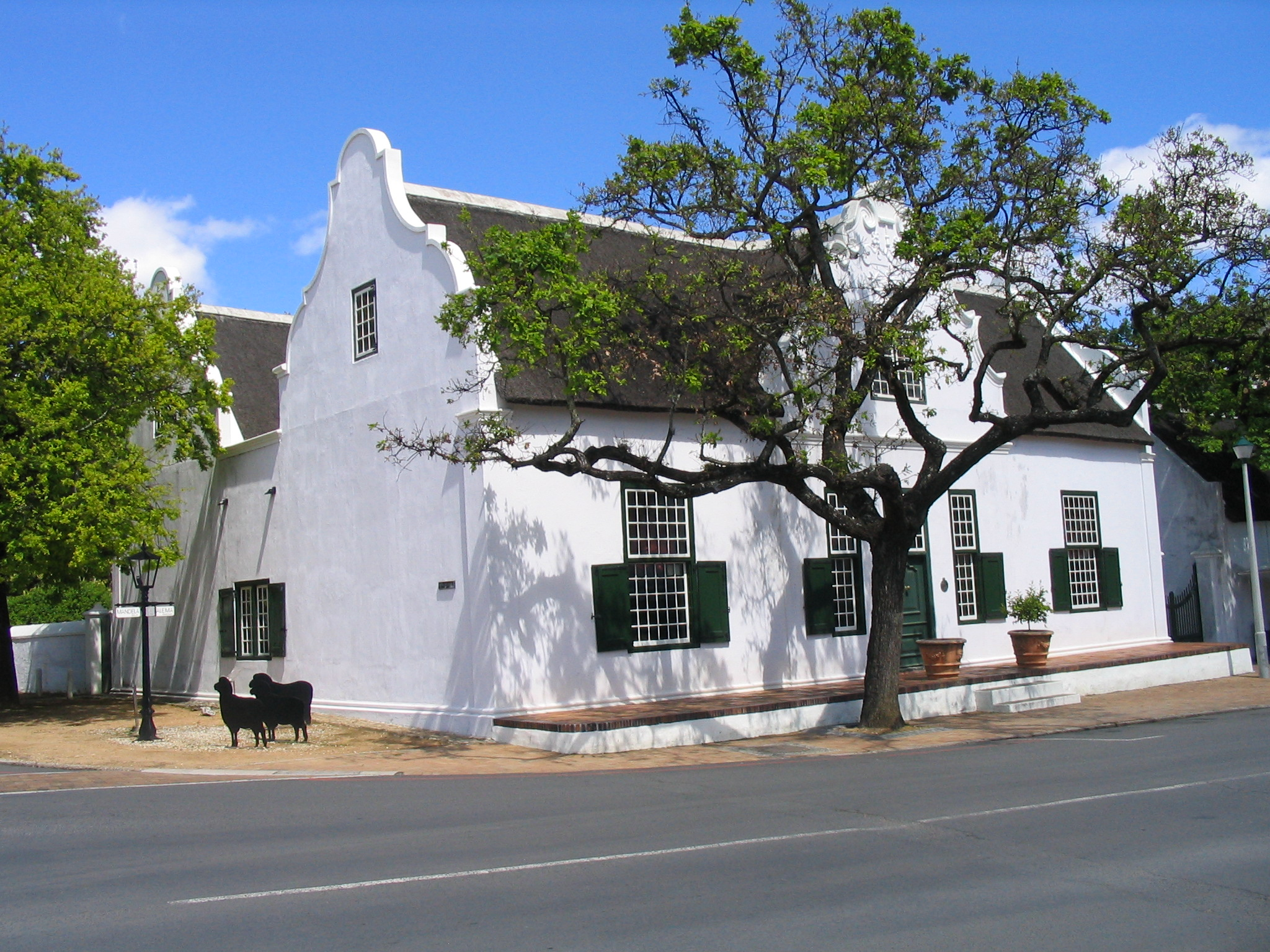
The Blettermanhuis, built in 1789, a historic house in the typical Cape Dutch style in Stellenbosch

The town was founded in 1679 by the Governor of the Cape Colony, Simon van der Stel, who named it after himself – Stellenbosch means "(van der) Stel's Forest". It is situated on the banks of the Eerste River ("First River"), so named as it was the first new river he reached and followed when he went on an expedition over the Cape Flats to explore the territory towards what is now known as Stellenbosch. The town grew so quickly that it became an independent local authority in 1682 and the seat of a magistrate with jurisdiction over 25,000 square kilometers (9,700 sq mi) in 1685.

From the beginning, the population living in the town and its surroundings was highly mixed, consisting of European (Dutch, French, German) citizens, enslaved people, 15 individual free-blacks, and 16 indigenous Khoi and San people. A minority of these free-blacks were able to amass significant wealth, even owning farms and enslaved people and employing white servants. The indigenous Khoisan were never officially enslaved, but due to several factors, including colonial encroachment on their hunting and grazing lands, illness, and extermination by European hunting parties, they were gradually forced to submit to colonial rule despite widespread resistance. Many became labourers on farms, domestic workers, or wagon drivers. Life in early Stellenbosch society for the Khoi, San, and enslaved people was extremely cruel and characterised by violence, hard work, and strict discipline Farming was the dominant industry of the town, and due to the massive size of the early land grants, European farmers depended on enslaved and Indigenous labour. The isolated nature of these farms, where most enslaved and Indigenous people lived and worked, meant that unified resistance action was difficult.

The Dutch were skilled in hydraulic engineering and they devised a system of furrows to direct water from the Eerste River in the vicinity of Thibault Street through the town along van Riebeeck Street to Mill Street where a mill was erected. Early visitors commented on the oak trees and gardens.

During 1690, some Huguenot refugees settled in Stellenbosch, grapes were planted in the fertile valleys around Stellenbosch and soon it became the centre of the South African wine industry.

In 1710, a fire destroyed most of the town, including the first church, all the Company property and twelve houses. Only two or three houses were left standing. When the church was rebuilt in 1723 it was located on what was then the outskirts of the town, to prevent a similar incident from destroying it again. This church has been enlarged a number of times since 1723 and is currently known as the "Moederkerk" (Mother Church).

=== Since the 1800s ===
The first school had been opened in 1683, but education in the town began in earnest in 1859 with the opening of a seminary for the Dutch Reformed Church. Rhenish Girls' High School, established in 1860, is the oldest school for girls in South Africa. A gymnasium, known as het Stellenbossche Gymnasium, was established in 1866. In 1874, some higher classes became Victoria College and then in 1918 University of Stellenbosch.

The first men's hostel to be established in Stellenbosch was Wilgenhof, in 1903. In 1905, the first women's hostel to be established in Stellenbosch was Harmonie . Harmonie and Wilgenhof were part of the Victoria College. In 1909, an old boy of the school, Paul Roos, captain of the first national rugby team to be called the Springboks, was invited to become the sixth rector of the school. He remained rector until 1940. On his retirement, the school's name was changed to Paul Roos Gymnasium.

With the manumission of enslaved people in 1838, the population of Stellenbosch's town centre increased as formerly enslaved people moved there, away from the isolated farmsteads. This small exodus formed the basis of the District's coloured community, and by 1850, they had established a neighbourhood and community which became known as ‘Die Vlakte’.

In the early days of the Second Boer War (1899–1902), Stellenbosch was one of the British military bases, and was used as a "remount" camp; and in consequence of officers who had not distinguished themselves at the front being sent back to it, the expression "to be Stellenbosched" came into use; so much so, that in similar cases officers were spoken of as "Stellenbosched" even if they were sent to some other place.

=== Apartheid and subsequent developments ===
The Group Areas Act of 1950 led to ‘Die Vlakte’ in central Stellenbosch being proclaimed a White Group Area in 1964. In the following decade, roughly 3,700 (mainly coloured people) either left or were later forced out of Central Stellenbosch, relocating or being settled to the urban periphery areas of Idas Valley and Cloetesville. Black people were forcibly removed to Kayamandi. Several homes, religious and educational buildings, and community centres were bulldozed. One remaining building which stands in what used to be a central street of 'Die Vlakte' is the Goejjatul Islam Mosque.

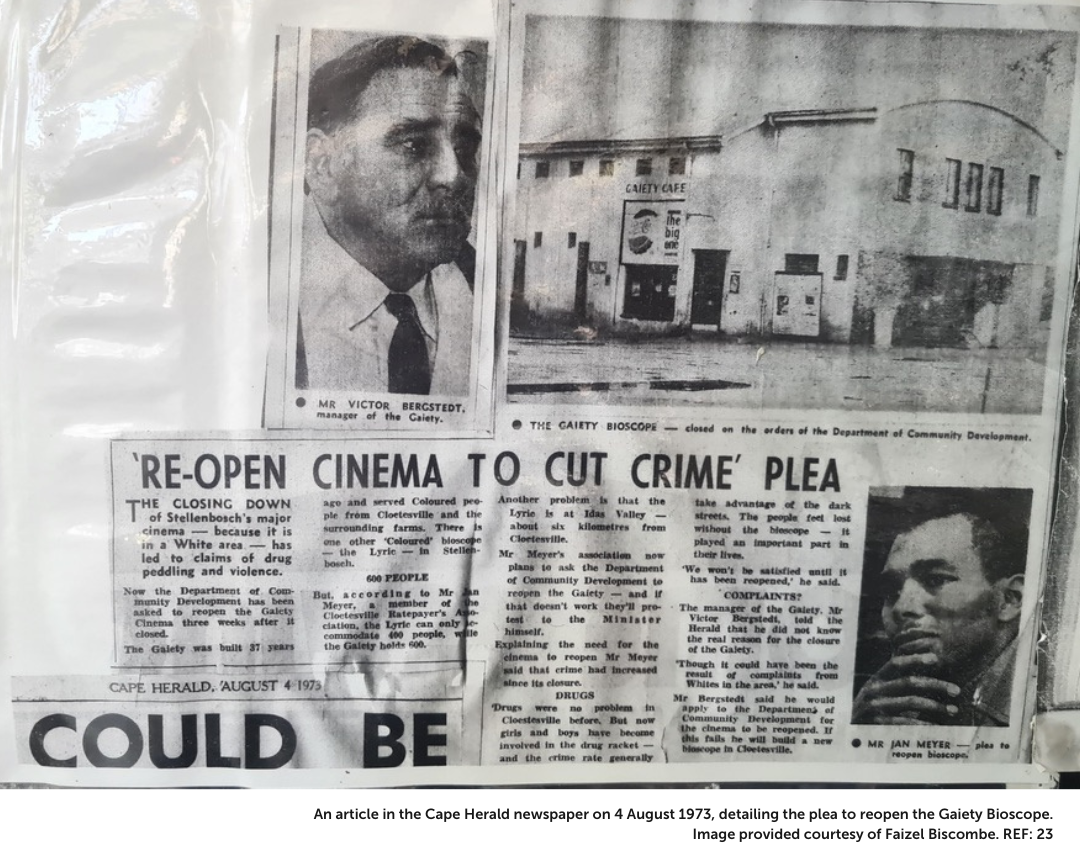
Plea from locals to reopen Gaiety Bioscope, after the land it was built on was declared a White Group Area. Article in the Cape Herald newspaper, 4 August 1973.

In post-Apartheid Stellenbosch and its surrounds, residential areas are still notably segregated: although the Group Areas Act was abolished in 1991, the economic and residential patterns it enforced have proven difficult to overcome. This continued residential segregation, soaring wealth inequality, the reputation of Stellenbosch as the ‘cradle of apartheid’, and several racial discrimination scandals related to the university all indicate how Stellenbosch continues to reckon with legacies of racism and discrimination in both its institutions and physical, social, and economic landscapes.

== Population ==
At the time of the 2011 census, the population of the urban area of Stellenbosch was 77,476, living in 23,730 households, in an area of 20.9 square kilometres (8.1 sq mi). Roughly 63.8% of the residents spoke Afrikaans as their home language, 19.6% spoke isiXhosa, and 6.8% spoke English. 28.1% of the population identify as Black, 52.2% as Coloured, and 18.5% as White.

The Stellenbosch Municipality extends beyond the town of Stellenbosch itself to include rural areas, villages, and the town of Franschhoek. At the time of the 2011 census, the municipal population was 155,728, while by 2016 it was estimated to be 173,197. In 2017, the municipality estimated that the population in 2018 would increase to 176,523.

The 1936 census recorded a total population of 8,782 residents with 3,558 of them recorded as Coloured and 4,995 recorded as White.

== Climate and geography ==
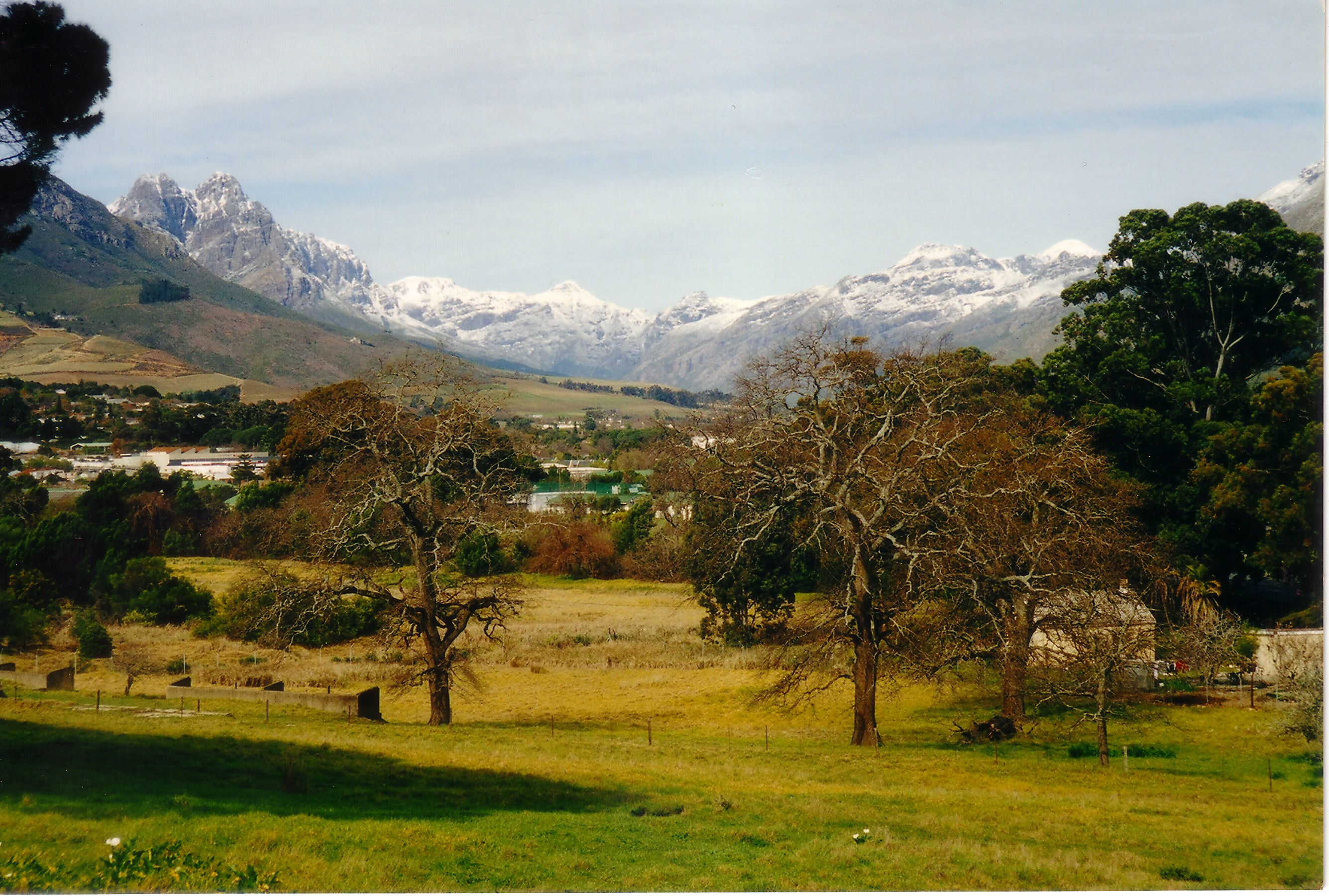
Stellenbosch's eastern suburbs in the winter months. In the background are the snowcapped Jonkershoek Mountains, with the prominent peak "The Twins" (elevation of 1,494 m (4,902 ft)) visible.

Stellenbosch is 53 km (33 mi) east of Cape Town via National Route N1. Stellenbosch is in a hilly region of the Cape Winelands, and is sheltered in a valley at an average elevation of 136 m (446 ft), flanked on the west by Papegaaiberg (Afrikaans: Parrot Mountain), which is actually a hill. To the south is Stellenbosch Mountain; to the east and southeast are the Jonkershoek, Drakenstein, and Simonsberg mountains. Die Tweeling Pieke (Afrikaans: The Twin Peaks) has an elevation of 1,494 m (4,902 ft); the highest point is Victoria Peak 1,590 m (5,220 ft). Jonkershoek Nature Reserve lies about 9 km (5.6 mi) east of Stellenbosch, and the Helderberg Nature Reserve is about 23 km (14 mi) south via provincial route R44. Just south of the Helderberg Nature Reserve is Strand, a seaside resort town. The soils of Stellenbosch range from dark alluvium to clay. This, combined with the well-drained, hilly terrain and Mediterranean climate, prove excellent for viticulture. Summers are dry and warm to hot, with some February and March days rising to over 40 °C (104 °F). Winters are cool, rainy and sometimes quite windy, with daytime temperatures averaging 16 °C (61 °F). Snow is usually seen a couple of times in winter on the surrounding mountains. Spring and autumn are cool, with daytime temperatures hovering around the early 20s.

Climate data for Stellenbosch, Western Cape
Month	Jan	Feb	Mar	Apr	May	Jun	Jul	Aug	Sep	Oct	Nov	Dec	Year
Mean daily maximum °C (°F)	27.8 (82.0)	28.1 (82.6)	26.4 (79.5)	23.2 (73.8)	19.4 (66.9)	16.2 (61.2)	15.8 (60.4)	16.1 (61.0)	18.0 (64.4)	21.0 (69.8)	23.2 (73.8)	26.0 (78.8)	21.8 (71.2)
Mean daily minimum °C (°F)	16.0 (60.8)	16.3 (61.3)	15.1 (59.2)	12.6 (54.7)	10.1 (50.2)	7.2 (45.0)	6.5 (43.7)	6.8 (44.2)	8.0 (46.4)	10.4 (50.7)	12.1 (53.8)	14.6 (58.3)	11.3 (52.4)
Average precipitation mm (inches)	33 (1.3)	35 (1.4)	36 (1.4)	60 (2.4)	95 (3.7)	141 (5.6)	127 (5.0)	107 (4.2)	86 (3.4)	68 (2.7)	53 (2.1)	37 (1.5)	878 (34.7)
Source: Stellenbosch climate

== Economy ==
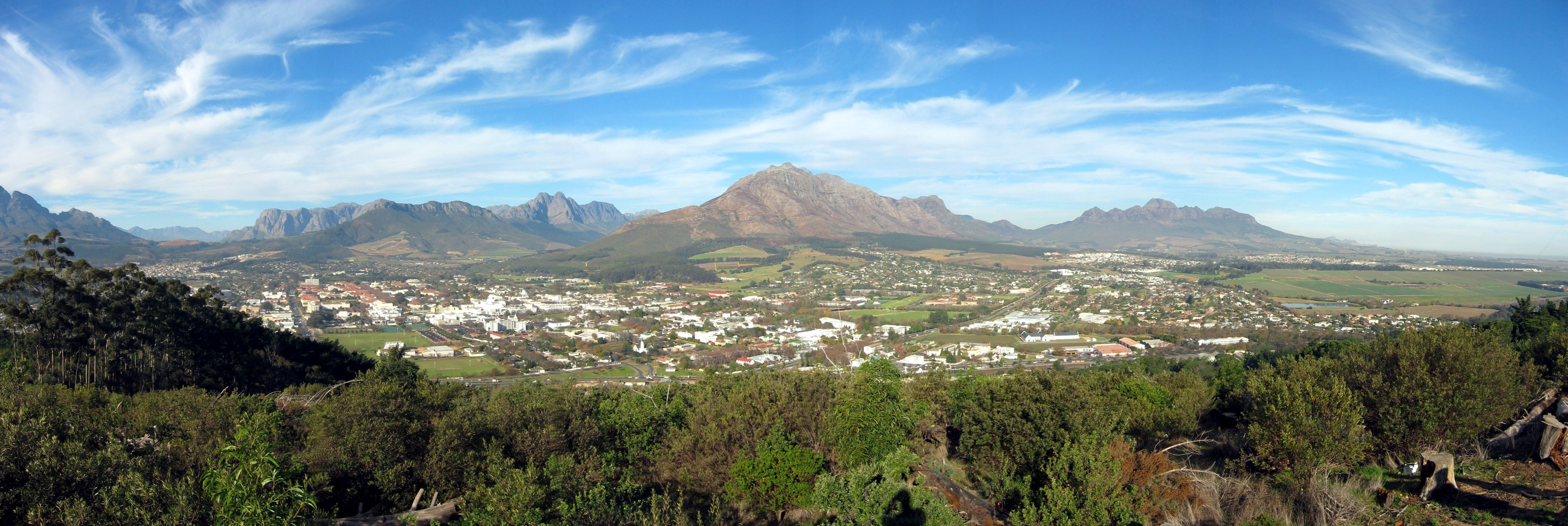
A panorama of Stellenbosch, as seen from Papegaaiberg

Stellenbosch is home to the headquarters of several large and small companies, including major South African bank Capitec Bank, fast food chain Hungry Lion, the regional HQ of French dairy products group Lactalis, major private hospital group Mediclinic International, fiber network operator Herotel, and investment holding company Remgro.

== Sport ==
Stellenbosch is a warm-weather training venue for cyclists, track and field squads, and triathletes. The Stellenbosch Sports Academy opened its doors in 2012 and hosts several rugby teams on a permanent basis, such as the Springbok Sevens and Western Province. It is also the home base of professional football club Stellenbosch FC who compete in the DStv Premiership.

== Viticulture and winemaking ==
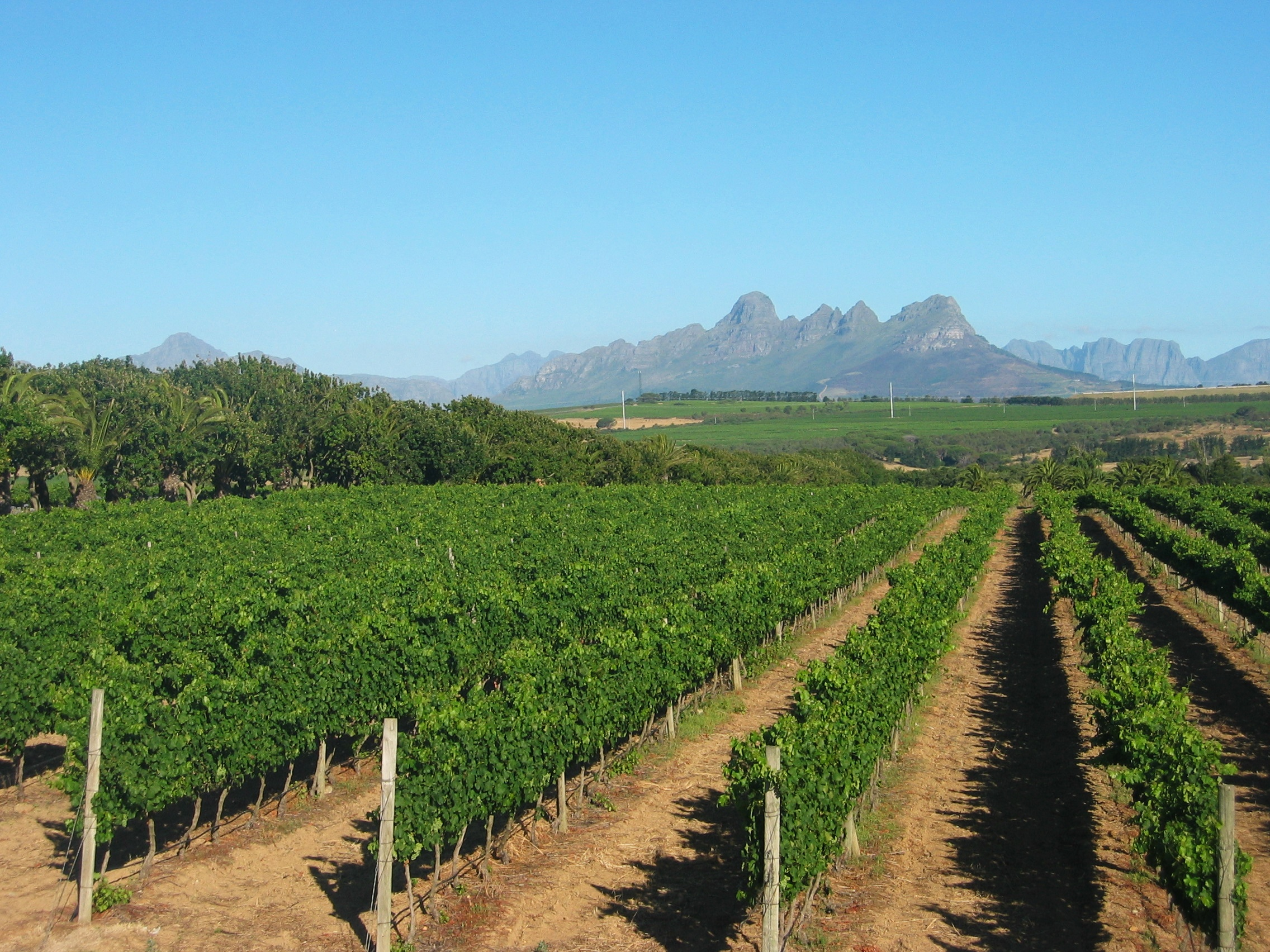
Vineyards on the outskirts of Stellenbosch, with Helderberg in the background

The Stellenbosch, Paarl and Franschhoek valleys form the Cape Winelands, the larger of the two main wine growing regions in South Africa. The South African wine industry produces about 1,000,000,000 litres of wine annually. Stellenbosch is the primary location for viticulture and viticulture research. Professor Perold was the first Professor of Viticulture at Stellenbosch University. The Stellenbosch Wine Route established in 1971 by Frans Malan from Simonsig, Spatz Sperling from Delheim, Neil Joubert from Spier and David van Velden from Overgaauw, known as Stellenbosch American Express® Wine Routes since 2002, is a world-renowned and popular tourist destination. This route provides visitors the opportunity to experience a wide range of cultivars and includes farms such as Warwick and JC Le Roux.

The region has a Mediterranean climate with hot dry summers and cool wet winters. Stellenbosch lies at the foot of the Cape Fold mountain range, which provides soil favourable to viticulture. Grapes grown in this area are mainly used for wine production, as opposed to table grapes. The region possesses a wide range of soils in the area, from light, sandy soils to decomposed granite. Stellenbosch Cabernet Sauvignon is beginning to get a good reputation as a fine wine.

== Stellenbosch University ==
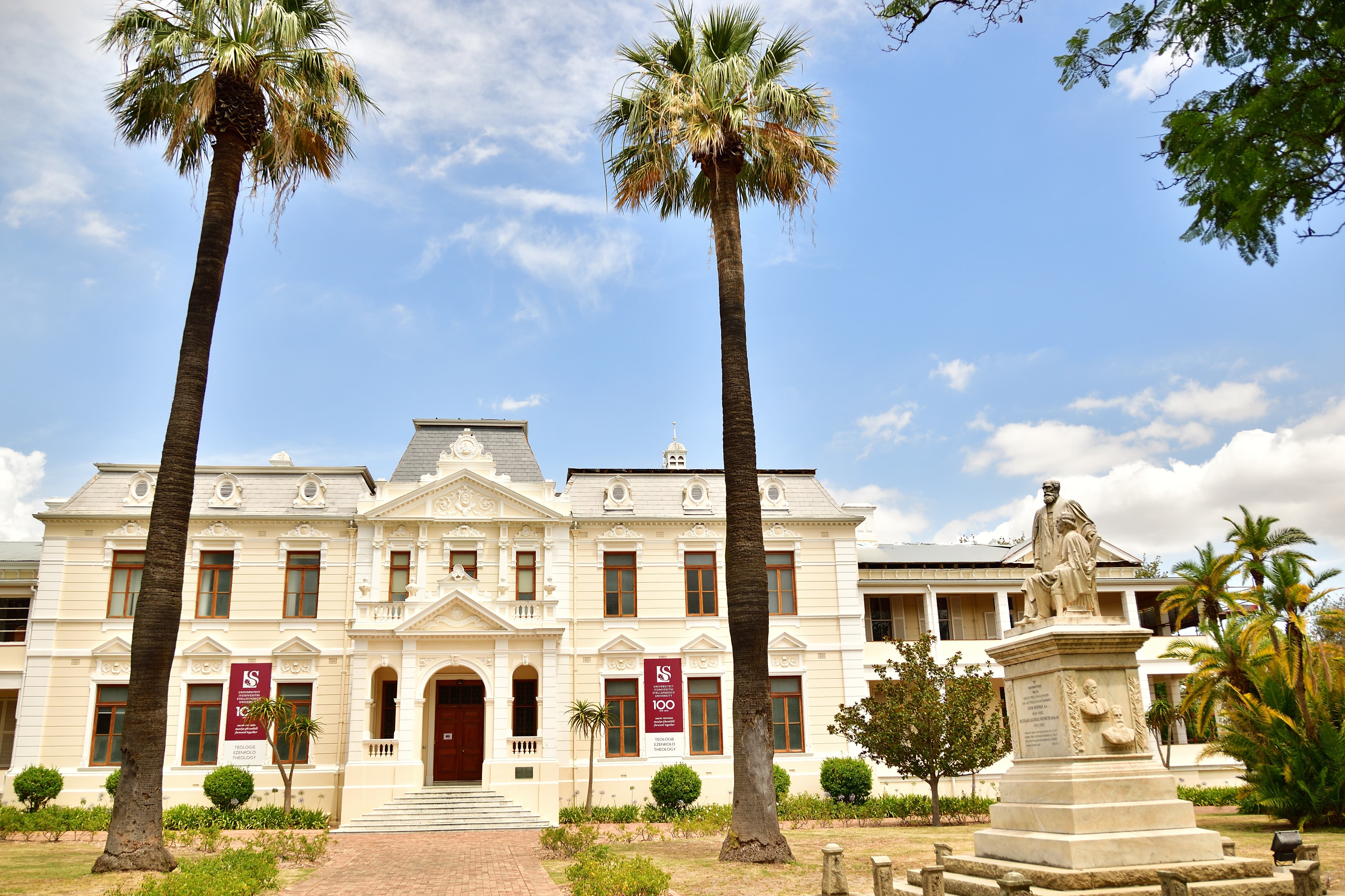
Theology Building of Stellenbosch University, at the top of Dorp Street

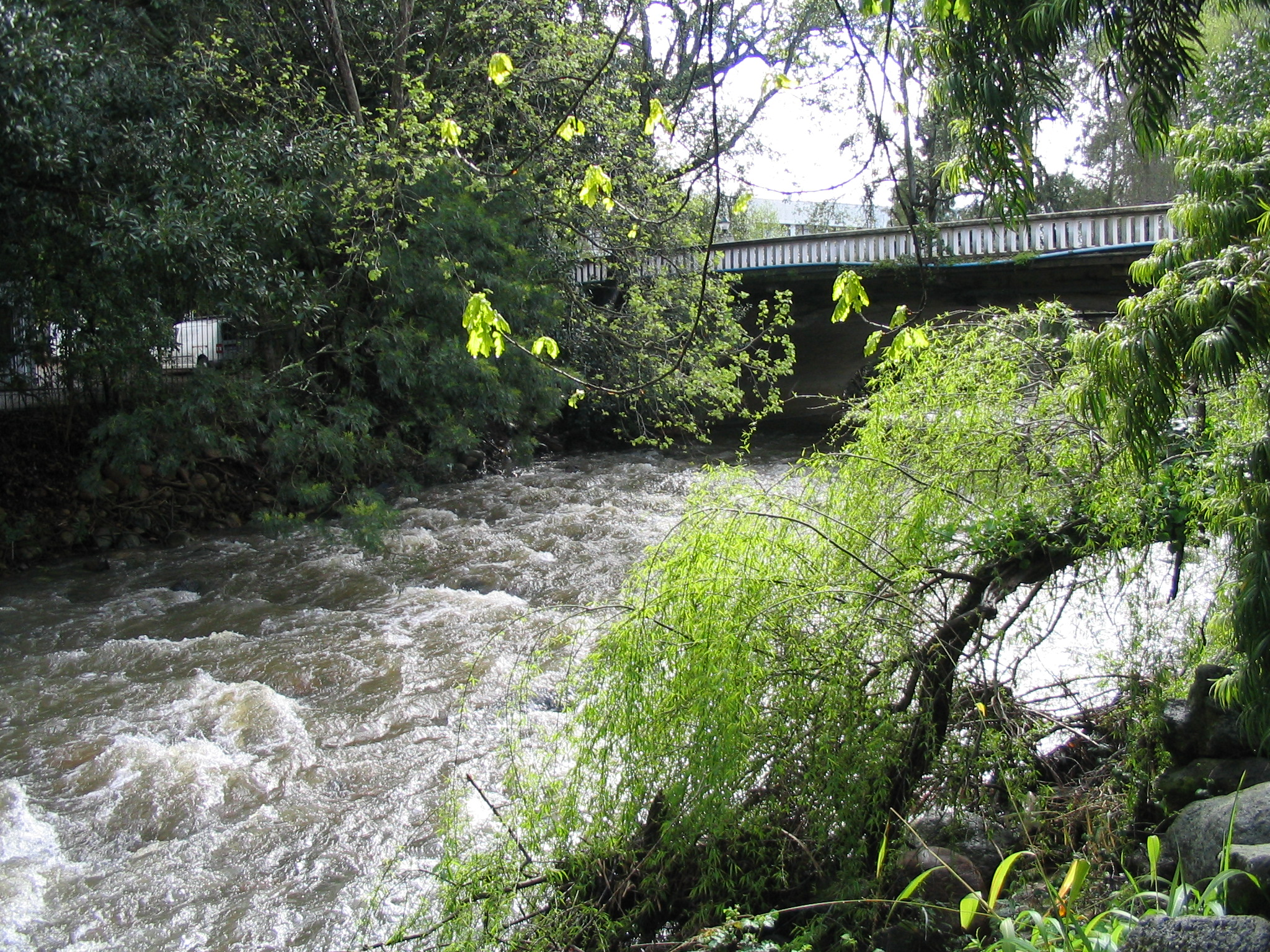
Eerste River in Stellenbosch after heavy rains

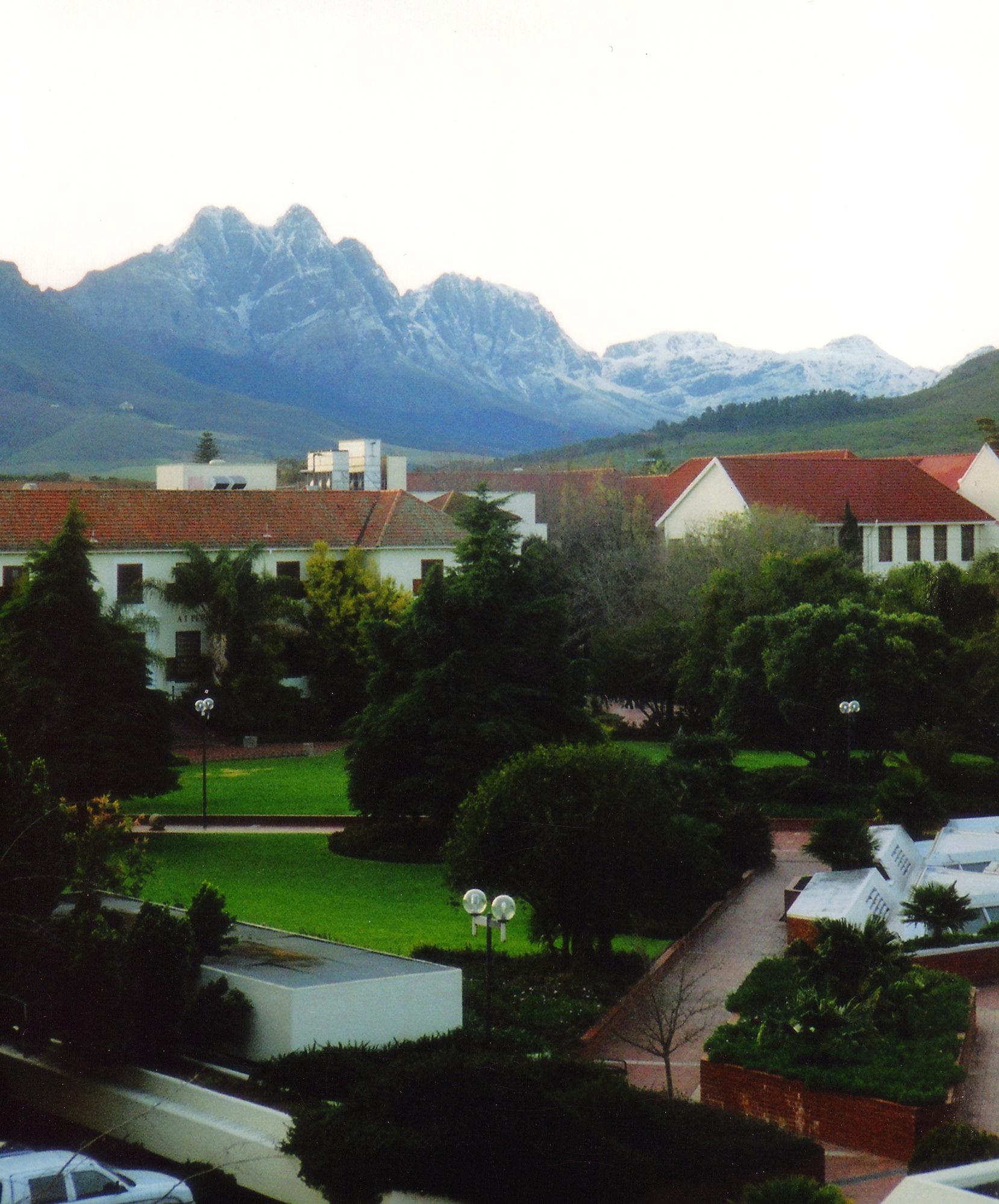
View over the "Red Square" of Stellenbosch University with the peak, "The Twins" beyond

Stellenbosch University is one of South Africa's leading universities. This institution has a history dating back to 1863 and has 10 faculties, including Engineering, Commerce, Science and Arts. The Department of Electrical and Electronic Engineering is the only university department in the southern hemisphere which has successfully built a communications satellite Sunsat which was launched in 2000 and orbited the Earth for three years.

The university currently has about 29,000 students. White students in 2014, namely 18,636, constitute 63.4% of all students enrolled. Most post-graduate courses are presented in English. The university council with the concurrence of the senate approved a new language policy on 22 June 2016 for implementation from 1 January 2017. The university has committed to introducing multilingualism by using the province's three official languages, namely Afrikaans, English and isiXhosa.

== List of suburbs ==
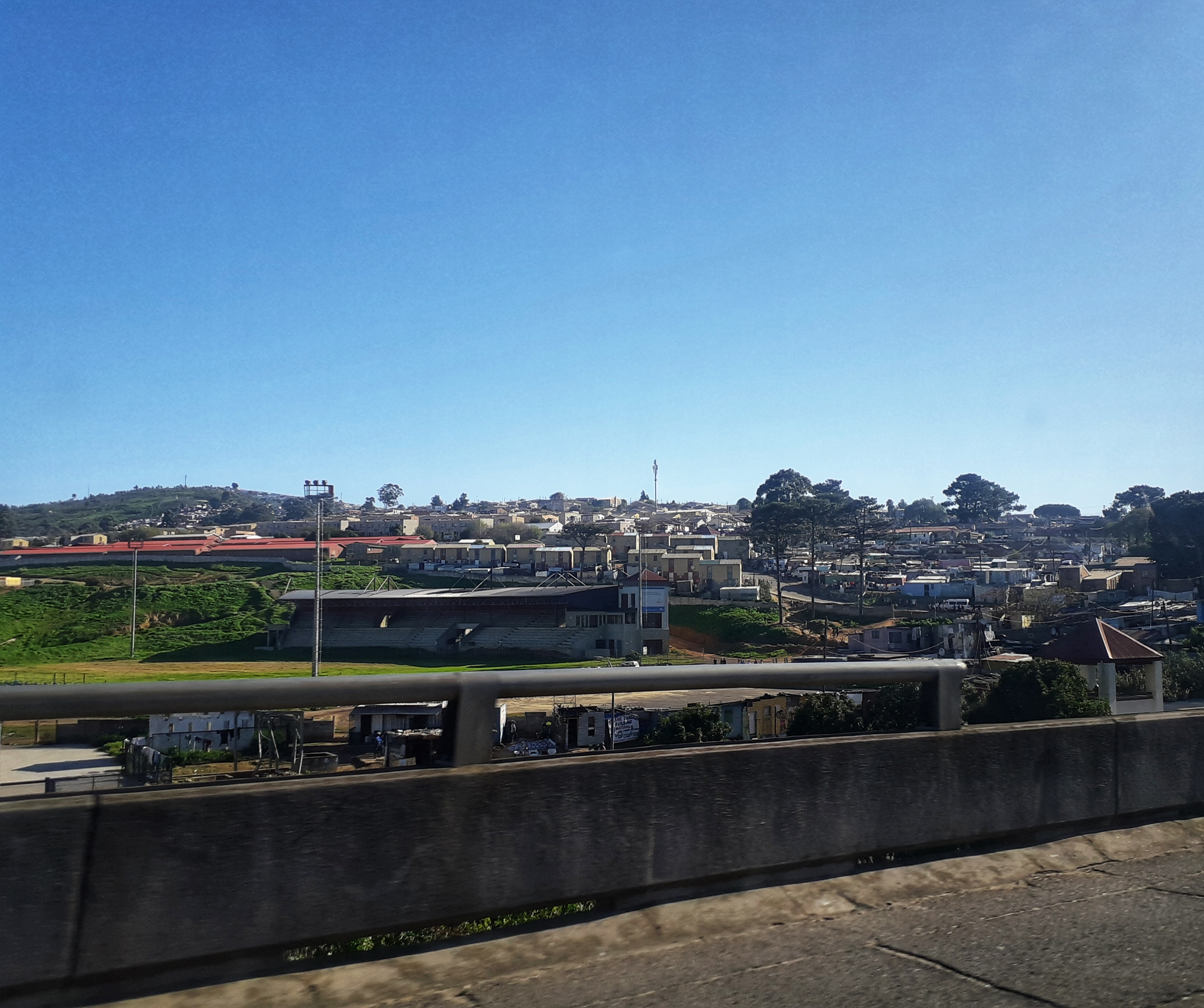
The township of Kayamandi located on the outskirts of Stellenbosch

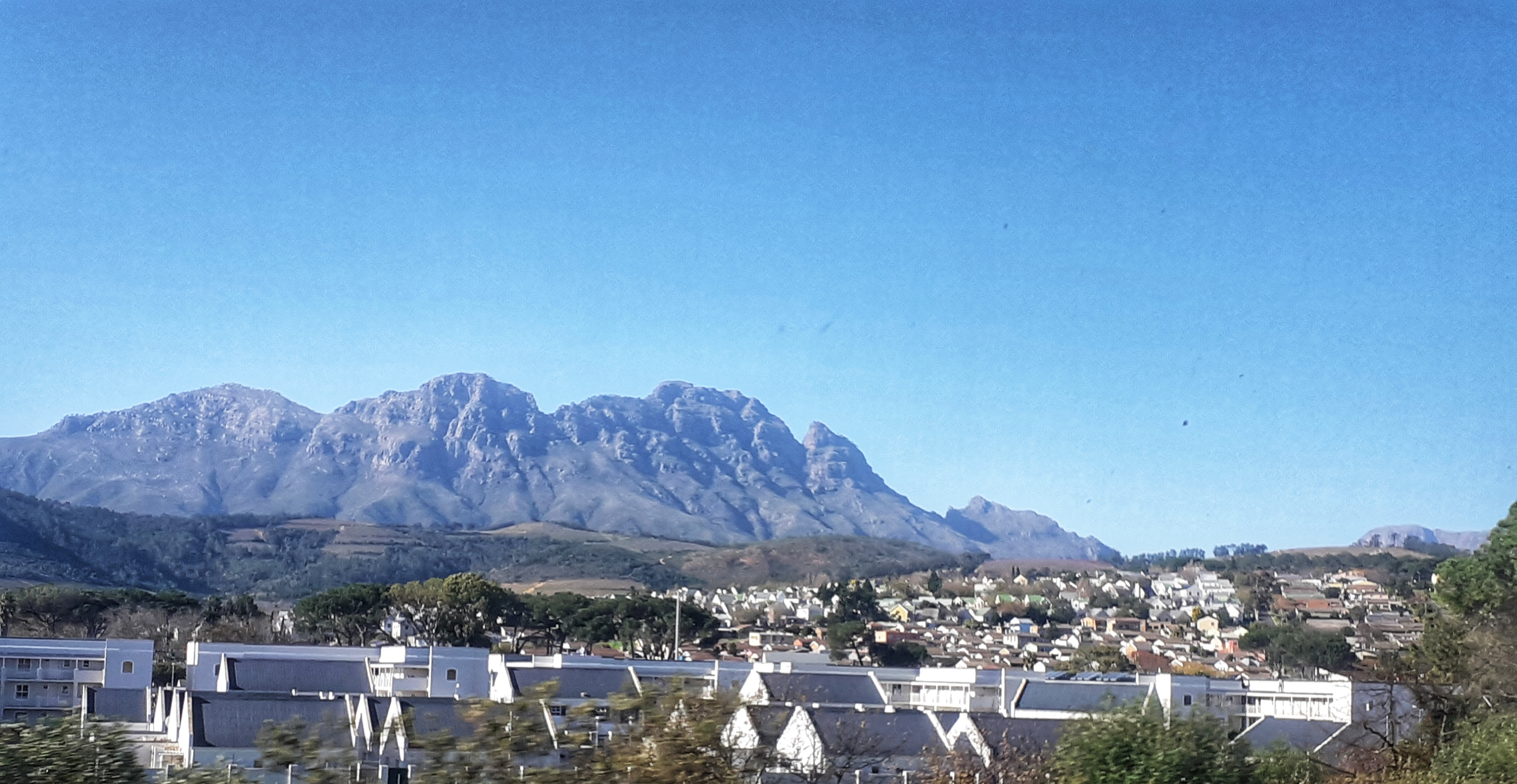
View of Nuutgevonden Estate, Cloetesville and Welgevonden Estate in the foreground and the Simonsberg Mountain in the background

- Annandale
- Arbeidslus
- Brandwacht
- Cloetesville
- Coetzenburg
- Dalsig
- Dennesig
- De Zalze
- De Novo
- Devon Valley
- Die Boord, previously Rhodes Fruit Farms
- Die Rant
- Ida's Valley
- Jamestown
- Jonkershoek
- Karindal
- Kayamandi
- Klapmuts
- Koelenhof
- Krigeville
- Kylemore
- Welbedaght
- La Colline
- Lanquedoc
- Meerlust
- Mostertsdrift
- Onderpapegaaiberg, also known as Voëltjiesdorp
- Paradyskloof
- Plankenberg
- Pniel
- Raithby
- Rozendal
- Simondium
- Simonsrust
- Simonswyk
- Techno Park
- Tennantville
- Town central
- Uniepark
- Universiteitsoord
- Vlottenburg
- Weides
- Welbedaght
- Welgevonden

== List of schools ==
Primary Schools

- A.F. Louw Primary School
- Bruckner De Villiers Primary School
- Cloetesville Primary School
- Devonvallei Primary School
- Eikestad Primary School
- Idasvallei Primary School
- Ikaya Primary School
- JJ Rhode Primary School
- Kayamandi Primary School
- Koelenhof Primary School
- Lynedoch Primary School
- P.C Petersen Primary School
- Rhenish Primary School
- Stellenbosch Primary School
- St Idas A.C. Primary School
- Weber Gedenk Primary School

Secondary Schools

- Bloemhof High School
- Cloetesville High School
- Kayamandi High School
- Lückhoff Secondary School
- Makupula Secondary School
- Paul Roos Gymnasium
- Pieter Langeveldt Primary School
- Rhenish Girls' High School
- Rietenbosch Primary School
- Stellenbosch High School
- Stellenzicht Senior Secondary School

== Transport ==
=== Rail ===
Stellenbosch lies on the Muldersvlei rail branch of the Northern Line operated by Metrorail Western Cape commuter rail system which connects Stellenbosch with Cape Town to the west via Eersterivier, Kuilsrivier, and Bellville. Stellenbosch has two railway stations including its main railway station, Stellenbosch Railway Station to the east of the CBD along the R310 Adam Tas Road and Du Toit Railway Station to the north of the CBD in Plankenbrug.

=== Roads ===
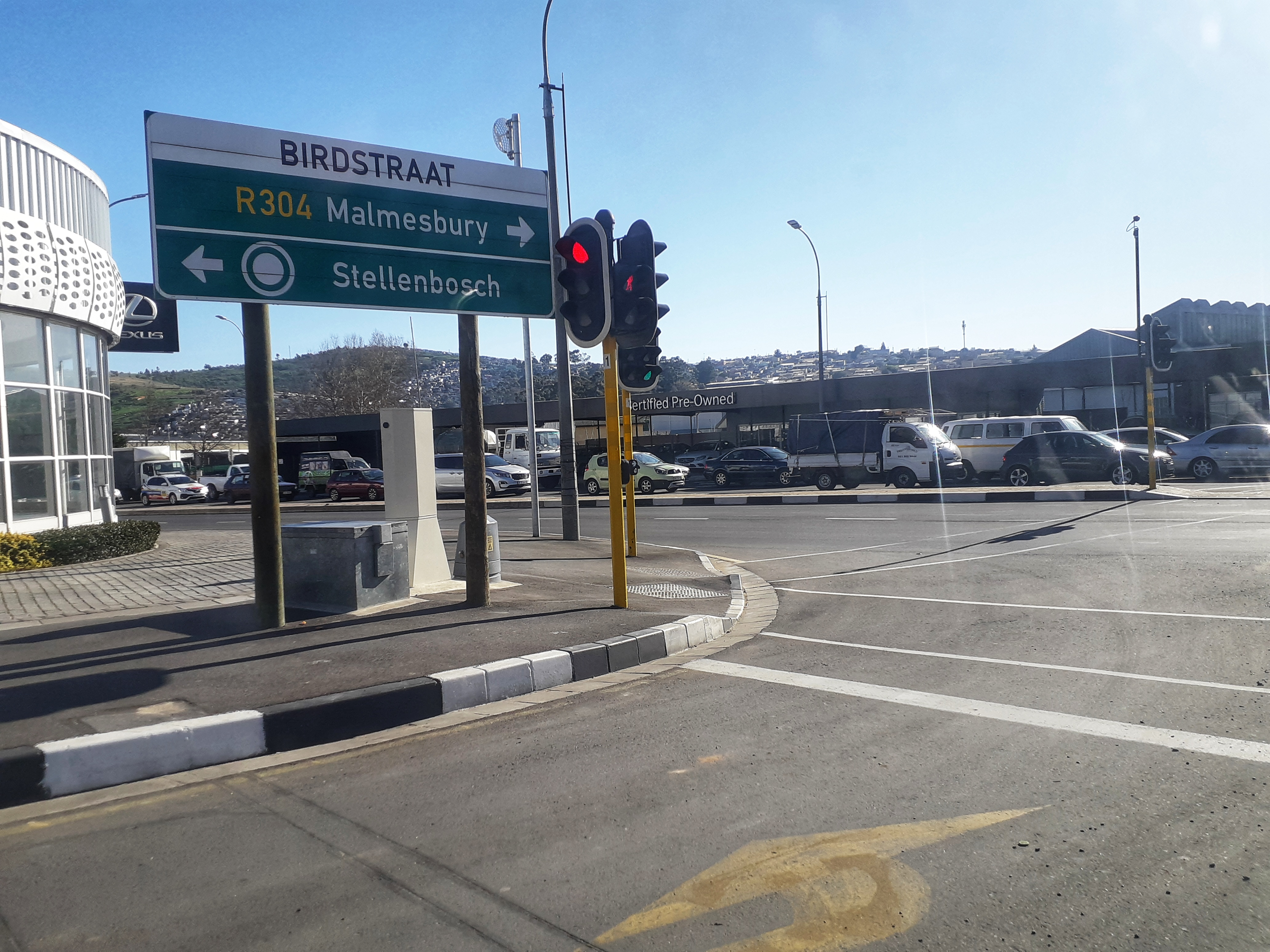
Bird Street, Stellenbosch Central

Stellenbosch is not directly linked to any major freeway or highway, but it is connected to the N1 (to Cape Town and Paarl) via the R44 and R304, the N2 (to Cape Town and George) via the R44 and R310, and the R300 (to Bellville and Mitchells Plain) via the M12.

The R44 (Adam Tas Street; Strand Road) connects Stellenbosch with Klapmuts and Wellington to the north and Somerset West to the south. The R304 (Bird Street; Koelenhof Road) connects Stellenbosch with Klipheuwel and Atlantis to the north-west. The R310 (Adams Tas Street; Helshoogte Road) connects Stellenbosch with Franschhoek to the east and Muizenberg to the south-west.

Stellenbosch is also served by two metropolitan routes linking it to nearby towns in the City of Cape Town. The M12 (Polkadraai Road) which begins at the intersection with the R310 just outside Stellenbosch connects the town with Kuilsrivier and the Cape Town International Airport to the west. The M23 (Bottelary Road) which begins at the intersection with the R304 just outside Stellenbosch connects the town with Kuilsrivier, Brackenfell and Bellville to the north-west.

Bird Street is the main street through Stellenbosch Central stretching for about 2 kilometres in a north–south direction.

== Houses of worship ==
- Moederkerk
- Stellenbosch Synagogue

== Notable people ==
- Ferdie Bergh – rugby player
- Bernette Beyers – track cyclist
- Kees Bruynzeel – Dutch businessman, timber merchant and yachtsman
- Dirk Coetsee – Chancellor (Hoofdheemraad) of the District of Stellenbosch and Drakenstein in South Africa for most of the 1690s and early 1700s
- Danie Craven – rugby administrator
- Giniel de Villiers – Rally driver
- David Earl – composer and pianist
- Arnu Fourie – Paralympic athlete
- Justin Harding - Golfer
- Hans Heinrich Hattingh - Dutch Cape Colony free burgher, proprietor of the Spier Estate
- Omar Henry – cricketer
- Daniel Hugo – radio producer, lecturer and poet
- Charl Langeveldt – cricketer
- Lee Langeveldt – football player
- D. F. Malan – Prime Minister of South Africa from 1948 to 1954
- Jannie Marais (Johannes Henoch Marais) – mining magnate, politician and philanthropist who co-founded the multi-billion dollar media conglomerate Naspers and the University of Stellenbosch
- JP Pietersen – rugby player
- Paul Roos – South African rugby union captain
- Anton Rupert – entrepreneur, businessman, conservationist
- Johann Rupert – businessman
- Dana Snyman – journalist, writer and playwright
- Conrad Stoltz – 2-time Olympian, 3 time Xterra world champion
- Roger Telemachus – cricketer
- Sampie Terreblanche – Professor in Economics, co-founder of Democratic Party
- Richard Turner – philosopher
- Frederik van Zyl Slabbert – anti-apartheid Member of Parliament and leader of opposition, lecturer in sociology
- Hendrik Verwoerd –"father of apartheid"- Prime Minister of South Africa from 1958 to 1966
- William Charles Winshaw - physician
- Luke Le Roux - footballer for Portsmouth

== Coats of arms ==
The municipality currently uses a badge consisting of a fleur de lis and a cross issuing from a stylised bunch of grapes. In the past, the various local authorities used coats of arms.

- Drostdy – The drostdy (1685–1827) was the local authority for the whole Stellenbosch district, including the city. In 1804, when the Cape Colony was ruled by the Batavian Republic, the government assigned an armorial seal to the drostdy. It depicted the shield of arms of Simon van der Stel superimposed on an anchor representing Hope, on a golden background. In 1814, the British occupation authorities ordered the drostdyen to use the royal coat of arms instead. Van der Stel's arms were quartered: 1 two red towers on a golden background; 2 a peacock on a red background; 3 three silver discs or balls stacked 1 over 2 on a red background; 4 a red tower on a golden background. In the centre was a smaller blue shield displaying six silver crescents (or, possibly, ribs) 2, 2, and 2.
- Municipality (1) – The Stellenbosch municipality was formed in 1840, to administer the city, but not the rest of the district. Although it was not the legal successor to the drostdy, it adopted the old drostdy seal of arms. A few changes were made to the arms over the years: quarters 2 and 3 were changed from red to blue; the peacock was turned to a profile position; the three silver discs or balls were changed to golden rings; the central shield was changed from blue to black. Whether any of these changes was intentional, or whether they were the result of artistic errors, is unclear.
- Municipality (2) – The municipal council had a new coat of arms designed by Michael Dawes in 1951. After some improvements, the College of Arms granted them on 26 June 1952. They were registered at the Bureau of Heraldry on 31 August 1979. The new design was a golden shield displaying the three towers from the Van der Stel arms, and a red fess displaying the peacock between golden rings. The crest was an anchor entwined with oak leaves and acorns. The motto Fortis et superbus ("Strong and proud") was chosen.
- Divisional council (1) – The divisional council, established in 1855, administered the rural areas outside the city. At some point, it adopted the plain Van der Stel arms, i.e. a golden shield displaying three red towers.

Stellenbosch Divisional Council coat of arms (1970)

- Divisional council (2) – The divisional council had its arms re-designed by Cornelis Pama in 1970, and registered them at the Bureau of Heraldry on 30 October 1970. The shield was divided down the centre into gold and red, and the three towers were counterchanged. A red tower was added as a crest.
- Kaya Mandi – The local authority for the Black township of Kaya Mandi registered arms at the Bureau on 27 November 1987.

== See also ==
- Murder of Hannah Cornelius
- Tygerberg Zoo
- Van Breda murders
