= Kayamandi =

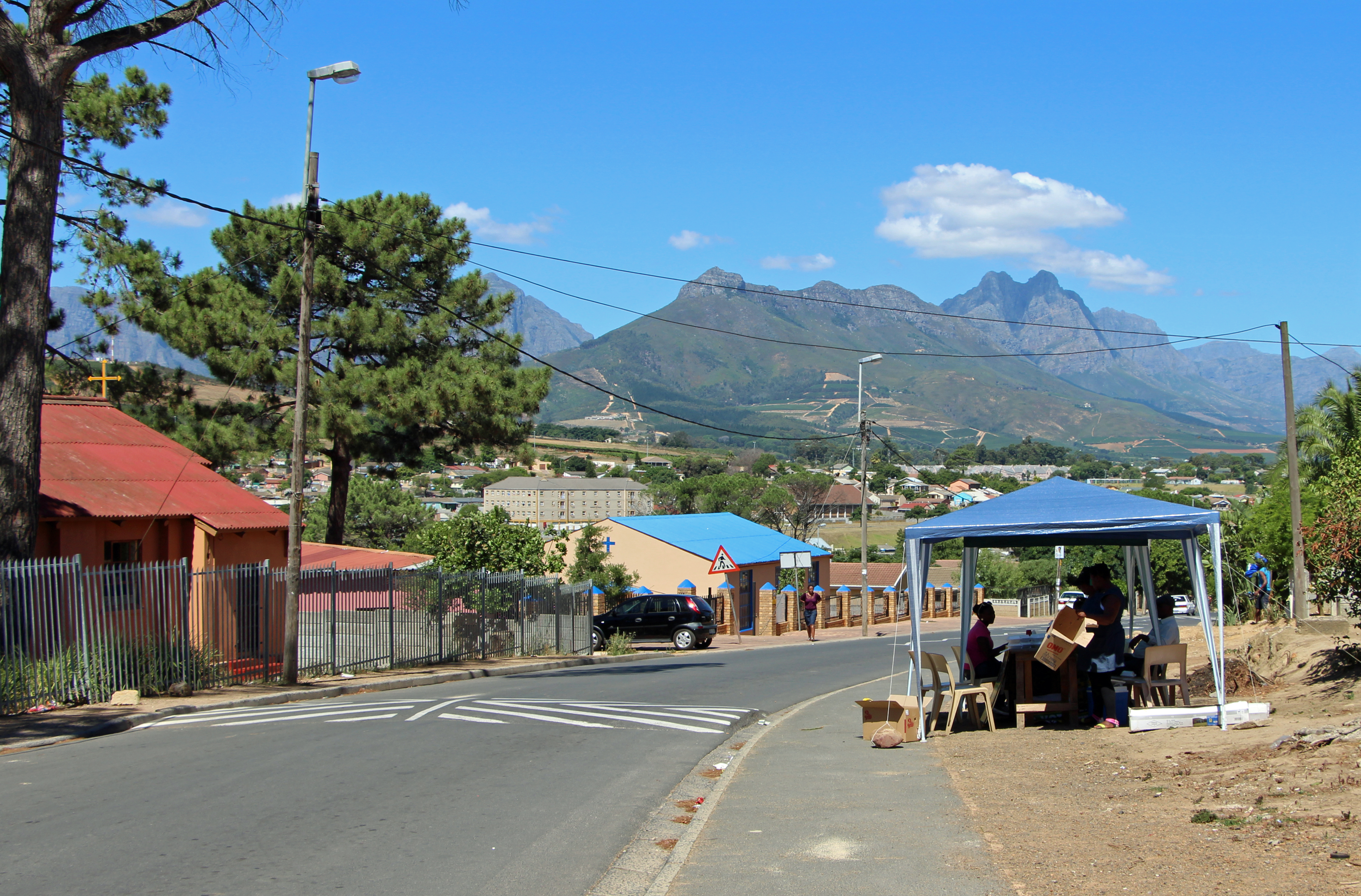
- Masithandane Street, Kayamandi

- Location within Western Cape Location within South Africa
- Coordinates: 33°55′S 18°51′E
- Country: South Africa
- Province: Western Cape
- District: Cape Winelands
- Municipality: Stellenbosch

Area
  - Total: 1.54 km^{2} (0.59 sq mi)

Population (2011)
  - Total: 24,645
  - Density: 16,000/km^{2} (41,400/sq mi)

Racial makeup (2011)
  - Black African: 94.6%
  - Coloured: 4.7%
  - Indian/Asian: 0.1%
  - White: 0.2%
  - Other: 0.5%

First languages (2011)
  - Xhosa: 84.9%
  - Afrikaans: 5.9%
  - English: 3.2%
  - Sotho: 2.3%
  - Other: 3.7%
- Time zone: UTC+2 (SAST)
- Postal code (street): 7600
- PO box: 7615
- Area code: 021

Kayamandi is a suburb of Stellenbosch in the Western Cape province of South Africa located off route R304. Kayamandi is one of the developing townships situated in Stellenbosch.

== History ==
The name means "nice home" in the Xhosa language, from khaya meaning "home" and mnandi meaning "nice". It was founded in the early 1950s as part of the increased segregation during the apartheid regime. It was originally built to house exclusively black migrant male labourers employed on the farms in the Stellenbosch area. In 1966, the nine largest employers in the Stellenbosch district including Stellenbosch University, the town administration, several vineyards and a fruit packing company united to erect 38 ready-made homes, so called hostels.

== Languages ==
The principal language spoken in Kayamandi is Xhosa, a tonal language which incorporates the use of click consonants, although there is widespread knowledge of both English and Afrikaans.

== Schools ==
Primary Schools

- Ikaya Primary School
- Kayamandi Primary School

Secondary Schools

- Makupula Secondary School
- Kayamandi High School

== Social Activities ==
There are many projects done by young and old people of Kayamandi, such as Kayamandi Arts and Culture Festival. There are about 27 registered pre-schools and more than ten registered organisations such as Vision Africa, Prochorus, Lokxion Foundation, Legacy Center, Trust Center, Songo.Info, IMBADU, Kayamandi Business Development Forum, Stellenbosch FM, 'The Voice of eKhaya-Stellies'. www.stellenboschfm.co.za etc.

== Sports ==
Kayamandi is a soccer loving community with more than 20 teams, most of them playing informal soccer. Well known teams are Kuyasa FC, FC Malaga, Lokxion Stars FC, Kayamandi Hotspurs, Barca Juniors, Mighty Five Stars and FC Twetwe.
