= Breede Valley Local Municipality =

Breede Valley Breedevallei
- Local municipality
- Seal

- Location in the Western Cape
- Coordinates: 33°40′S 19°30′E
- Country: South Africa
- Province: Western Cape
- District: Cape Winelands
- Seat: Worcester
- Wards: 21

Government
  - Type: Municipal council
  - Mayor: Antoinette Steyn (DA)

Area
  - Total: 3,833 km^{2} (1,480 sq mi)

Population (2022)
  - Total: 212,682
  - Density: 55.49/km^{2} (143.7/sq mi)

Racial makeup (2022)
  - Black African: 30.0%
  - Coloured: 59.1%
  - Indian/Asian: 0.4%
  - White: 9.5%

First languages (2011)
  - Afrikaans: 76.0%
  - Xhosa: 16.1%
  - English: 2.9%
  - Sotho: 2.7%
  - Other: 2.3%
- Time zone: UTC+2 (SAST)
- Municipal code: WC025

Breede Valley Municipality (Afrikaans: Breedevallei Munisipaliteit; Xhosa: uMasipala weNtlambo yeBreede) is a local municipality located within the Cape Winelands District Municipality, in the Western Cape province of South Africa. As of 2022, it had a population of 212,682. Its municipality code is WC025.

== Geography ==
The municipality covers a total area of 3,833 square kilometres (1,480 sq mi). It includes a middle section of the Breede River Valley around the town of Worcester, and stretches up the Hex River valley to the edge of the Karoo. It abuts on the Witzenberg Municipality to the north, the Laingsburg Municipality to the east, the Langeberg Municipality to the southeast, the Theewaterskloof Municipality to the south, the Stellenbosch Municipality to the southwest and the Drakenstein Municipality to the west.

== Demographics ==
At the 2022 census, the Breede Valley municipality had a population of 212,682 people, increasing at an annual rate of 2.4% from 2011. 59.1% identified as "Coloured," 30.0% as "Black African," and 9.5% as "White."

According to the 2011 census the municipality has a population of 166,825 people in 42,527 households. Of this population, 63.3% describe themselves as "Coloured", 24.3% as "Black African", and 10.7% as "White". The first language of 76.0% of the population is Afrikaans, while 16.1% speak Xhosa, 2.9% speak English and 2.7% speak Sotho.

Most of the residents of the municipality live in Worcester, which as of 2011 has a population of 97,078. Other towns in the municipality are Rawsonville (pop. 3,099) close to Worcester in the Breede Valley; De Doorns (pop. 11,278) in the Hex River Valley; and Touws River (pop. 8,126) on the edge of the Karoo.

== History ==
At the end of the apartheid era, the area that is today the Breede Valley Municipality formed part of the Breërivier Regional Services Council (RSC). The towns of Worcester, Rawsonville, De Doorns and Touws River were governed by municipal councils elected by their white residents. The coloured residents of Worcester, De Doorns and Touws River were governed by management committees subordinate to the white councils. Zweletemba was governed by a town council established under the Black Local Authorities Act, 1982.

While the negotiations to end apartheid were taking place a process was established for local authorities to agree on voluntary mergers. In January 1993, the Municipality of Worcester and the Worcester Management Committee merged into a single municipal council. Similar mergers occurred in De Doorns in June 1993 and Touws River in October 1993.

After the national elections of 1994 a process of local government transformation began, in which negotiations were held between the existing local authorities, political parties, and local community organisations. As a result of these negotiations, the existing local authorities were dissolved and transitional local councils (TLCs) were created for each town and village. In October 1994 the Municipality of Worcester and the Zweletemba Town Council were replaced by the Worcester TLC. In December the Municipality of Touws River was replaced by the Touws River TLC; and in January 1995 the municipalities of De Doorns and Rawsonville were both replaced by TLCs.

The transitional councils were initially made up of members nominated by the various parties to the negotiations, until May 1996 when elections were held. At these elections the Breërivier District Council was established, replacing the Breërivier RSC. Transitional representative councils (TRCs) were also elected to represent rural areas outside the TLCs on the District Council; the area that was to become Breede Valley Municipality included most of the Matroosberg TRC.

At the local elections of December 2000 the TLCs and TRCs were dissolved and the Breede Valley Municipality was established as a single local authority. At the same election the Breërivier District Council was also dissolved and replaced by the Boland District Municipality. In 2011 when District Management Areas were abolished, the eastern boundary of the municipality was extended to include the sparsely populated region to the east of Touws River which had formerly been part of a DMA.

== Politics ==
The municipal council consists of forty-one members elected by mixed-member proportional representation. Twenty-one councillors are elected by first-past-the-post voting in twenty-one wards, while the remaining twenty are chosen from party lists so that the total number of party representatives is proportional to the number of votes received.

In the election of 4 November 2026 no party obtained a majority of seats on the council. The Democratic Alliance won the most seats, with twenty.

The following table shows the results of the 2026 election.

Party	Ward			List			Total seats
Party	Votes	%	Seats	Votes	%	Seats	Total seats
Democratic Alliance	20,255	47.71	15	20,109	47.42	5	20
African National Congress	7,532	17.74	5	7,611	17.95	2	7
Patriotic Alliance	4,660	10.98	0	4,802	11.32	5	5
Freedom Front Plus	3,043	7.17	0	3,262	7.69	3	3
Breedevallei Onafhanklik	2,969	6.99	1	3,138	7.40	2	3
Economic Freedom Fighters	868	2.04	0	932	2.20	1	1
Good	684	1.61	0	665	1.57	1	1
African Christian Democratic Party	499	1.18	0	494	1.17	1	1
Independent candidates	571	1.34	0				0
13 other parties	1,375	3.24	0	1,389	3.28	0	0
Total	42,456	100.00	21	42,402	100.00	20	41
Valid votes	42,456	98.53		42,402	98.39		
Invalid/blank votes	633	1.47		693	1.61		
Total votes	43,089	100.00		43,095	100.00		
Registered voters/turnout	84,867	50.77		84,867	50.78		
