= Stellenbosch Local Municipality =

Stellenbosch
- Local municipality
- Seal

- Location in the Western Cape
- Coordinates: 33°55′S 19°55′E
- Country: South Africa
- Province: Western Cape
- District: Cape Winelands
- Seat: Stellenbosch
- Wards: 22

Government
  - Type: Municipal council
  - Mayor: Jeremy Fasser (DA)
  - Deputy Mayor: Mynhardt Slabbert (DA)
  - Speaker: Quintin Smit (DA)

Area
  - Total: 831 km^{2} (321 sq mi)

Population (2022)
  - Total: 175,411
  - Density: 211/km^{2} (547/sq mi)

Racial makeup (2022)
  - African: 37.0%
  - Coloured: 37.8%
  - Indian/Asian: 0.5%
  - White: 23.3%

First languages (2011)
  - Afrikaans: 67.7%
  - Xhosa: 20.8%
  - English: 7.2%
  - Sotho: 1.2%
  - Other: 3.1%
- Time zone: UTC+2 (SAST)
- Municipal code: WC024
- HDI: ▲0.74 high

Stellenbosch Municipality (Afrikaans: Stellenbosch Munisipaliteit, Xhosa: uMasipala wase Stellenbosch) is the local municipality that governs the towns of Stellenbosch, Franschhoek and Pniel, and the surrounding rural areas, in the Western Cape province of South Africa. It covers an area of 831 square kilometres (321 sq mi), and as of 2022 had a population of 175,411 people. It falls within the Cape Winelands District Municipality.

== Geography ==
The municipality covers an area of 831 square kilometres (321 sq mi) around the towns of Stellenbosch and Franschhoek. To the west and southwest it extends as far as the urban edge of the Cape Town metropolitan area, while to the east and southeast it is bounded by mountain ranges. The western part of the municipality around Stellenbosch and the eastern part in the Franschhoek valley are separated by mountains through which the Helshoogte Pass travels. The Stellenbosch Municipality abuts on the Drakenstein Municipality to the north, the Breede Valley Municipality to the northeast, the Theewaterskloof Municipality to the southeast and the City of Cape Town to the west and southwest.

About half of the residents of the municipality live in Stellenbosch and its suburbs, which have a total population of 77,476. The second-largest town is Franschhoek with 15,616 residents. Klapmuts (pop. 7,703) is situated on the northern edge of the municipality next to the N1 national road. In the Helshoogte Pass between Stellenbosch and Franschhoek are the villages of Pniel (pop. 1,975), Kylemore (pop. 4,328) and Languedoc (pop. 4,289). Other rural settlements in the municipality are Jamestown (pop. 2,840), Koelenhof (pop. 302), Lynedoch (pop. 108), Raithby (pop. 908) and Wiesiesdraai (pop. 1,727).

== Demographics ==
According to the 2022 South African census, the municipality had a population of 175,411, representing an increase from 155,728 in 2011. 37.6% of the population identified as "Coloured," 37.0% as "Black African," and 23.3% as "White."

== Controversies ==
Municipality probe the investigations against the racist vedio against the senior HR manager Alexander kannemeyer.

== History ==
At the end of the apartheid era, the area that is today the Stellenbosch Municipality formed part of the Western Cape Regional Services Council (RSC). The towns of Stellenbosch and Franschhoek were governed by municipal councils elected by their white residents. The coloured residents of Idas Valley and Cloetesville (Stellenbosch) and Groendal (Franschhoek) were governed by management committees subordinate to the white councils; those resident in Johannesdal, Kylemore and Klapmuts South by management committees subordinate to the RSC. Kayamandi was governed by a town council established under the Black Local Authorities Act, 1982. The former mission station of Pniel was governed by a board of management.

While the negotiations to end apartheid were taking place a process was established for local authorities to agree on voluntary mergers. The Franschhoek Municipality and Groendal Management Committee took part in this process, merging to create the non-racial Municipality for the Area of Franschhoek in September 1992.

After the national elections of 1994 a process of local government transformation began, in which negotiations were held between the existing local authorities, political parties, and local community organisations. As a result of these negotiations, the existing local authorities were dissolved and transitional local councils (TLCs) were created for each town and village. In January 1995 the Pniel Management Board was replaced by the Pniel TLC. In February 1995 the Stellenbosch TLC was established, replacing the Stellenbosch Municipality, the Kayamandi Town Council, and the management committees of Idas Valley/Cloetesville, Johannesdal, Kylemore and Klapmuts South. In the same month the Franschhoek TLC replaced the Municipality for the Area of Franschhoek, and the Western Cape RSC was reconstituted as the Winelands RSC after the Cape Town metropolitan area was removed from the jurisdiction of the RSC.

The transitional councils were initially made up of members nominated by the various parties to the negotiations, until May 1996 when elections were held. At these elections the Winelands District Council was established, replacing the Winelands RSC. Transitional representative councils (TRCs) were also elected to represent rural areas outside the TLCs on the District Council; the area that was to become Stellenbosch Municipality included the Stellenbosch TRC and part of the Paarl TRC.

At the local elections of December 2000 the TLCs and TRCs were dissolved and the Stellenbosch Municipality was established as a single local authority. At the same election the Winelands District Council was also dissolved and replaced by the Boland District Municipality. In 2006 a rural area to the southeast of Brackenfell was removed from the City of Cape Town and added to Stellenbosch Municipality.

== Demographics ==
According to the South African National Census of 2011, the population of the Stellenbosch Municipality was 155,733. This represents an annual growth rate of 2.7% compared to the result of the previous census in 2001 which found a population of 118,709 people. The sex ratio was 96, meaning that there were slightly more women than men. 52.2% of the population described themselves as Coloured (racially mixed), 28.1% as African, 18.5% as White, and 0.4% as Indian or Asian. When asked about their first language, 67.7% cited Afrikaans, 20.8% Xhosa and 7.2% English. 22.8% of the population was under the age of 15, while 4.9% was 65 or older.

Of those residents aged 20 or older, 3.2% had received no schooling, 13.0% had some schooling but did not finish primary school, 6.2% finished primary school but had no secondary schooling, 35.0% had some secondary schooling but did not finish Grade 12, 25.3% finished Grade 12 but had no higher education, and 17.4% had higher education. Overall, 42.7% had at least a Grade 12 education. Of those aged between 5 and 25, 70.0% were attending an educational institution. Amongst those aged between 15 and 65 the unemployment rate was 15.1%. The average annual household income was R154,617.

There were 43,420 households in the municipality, giving an average household size of 3.3 people. Of those households, 75.1% were in formal structures (houses or flats), while 22.9% were in informal structures (shacks). 92.9% of households used electricity for lighting. 80.5% of households had piped water to the dwelling, while 18.6% had piped water through a communal tap. 89.4% of households had regular refuse collection service. 91.7% of households had a flush or chemical toilet, while 2.6% used a bucket toilet. 81.1% of households had a refrigerator, 83.0% had a television and 67.6% had a radio. Only 25.9% had a landline telephone, but 89.2% had a cellphone. 37.7% had a computer, and 45.3% had access to the Internet (either through a computer or a cellphone).

== Politics ==
The municipal council consists of forty-five members elected by mixed-member proportional representation. Twenty-three councillors are elected by first-past-the-post voting in twenty-three wards, while the remaining twenty-two are chosen from party lists so that the total number of party representatives is proportional to the number of votes received.

In the 2026 local government elections, the Democratic Alliance (DA) received a majority of twenty-eight seats on the council.

The following table shows the results of the 2026 election.

Party	Ward			List			Total seats
Party	Votes	%	Seats	Votes	%	Seats	Total seats
Democratic Alliance	33,620	61.53	19	33,899	61.99	9	28
African National Congress	6,281	11.49	4	6,291	11.50	1	5
Patriotic Alliance	4,803	8.79	0	4,847	8.86	4	4
Freedom Front Plus	2,406	4.40	0	2,570	4.70	2	2
Good	1,873	3.43	0	1,729	3.16	2	2
Economic Freedom Fighters	1,565	2.86	0	1,496	2.74	1	1
African Christian Democratic Party	903	1.65	0	799	1.46	1	1
uMkhonto weSizwe Party	462	0.85	0	517	0.95	1	1
African Transformation Movement	314	0.57	0	526	0.96	1	1
10 other parties	2,417	4.42	0	2,009	3.67	0	0
Total	54,644	100.00	23	54,683	100.00	22	45
Valid votes	54,644	99.22		54,683	99.01		
Invalid/blank votes	428	0.78		549	0.99		
Total votes	55,072	100.00		55,232	100.00		
Registered voters/turnout	106,255	51.83		106,255	51.98		

=== Mayors ===
- Jeremy Fasser (November 2024 – present) (DA)
- Gesie van Deventer (August 2016 – November 2024) (DA)
- Conrad Sidego (June 2011 – August 2016) (DA)
- Cyril Jooste (December 2009 - June 2011) (DA)
- Patrick Swartz (April 2008 - December 2009) (KCA)
- Lauretta Maree (March 2006 - April 2008) (DA)
- Willie Ortell (October 2002 - March 2006) (NNP)

=== Political history ===
In the local government elections of 2000, the Democratic Alliance came to power in Stellenbosch. The administration was short-lived, however, and in October 2002, an African National Congress (ANC) and New National Party (NNP) coalition took over the council when four councillors defected from the DA and a local community party during a floor-crossing period. Willie Ortell (NNP) was elected mayor and GW Adonis (ANC) was chosen as deputy mayor.

After the next local government elections in 2006, a coalition was formed by the DA and several smaller parties, and Lauretta Maree of the DA was elected as executive mayor and Khulile Shubani of the United Democratic Movement (UDM) as deputy-mayor. In February 2008 councillor Myra Linders left the DA and stood as an independent candidate in the resulting by-election, and won. Her shift in allegiance allowed an ANC-led coalition, with the swing votes of the two councillors from the Kayamandi Community Alliance (KCA) to take control of the council in April 2008. Patrick Swartz of the KCA was elected mayor while Cameron Mcako of the ANC became deputy mayor. After serious allegations of fraud by councillors surfaced, Myra Linders once again used her swing vote to topple the administration in December 2009 by supporting a DA-led motion of no-confidence in the mayor, deputy mayor and speaker Gordon Pheiffer of the ANC. Cyril Jooste of the DA became the new mayor, and Mcako and Pheiffer both resigned.

In the 2011 local government elections voters handed the DA an outright majority of twenty-five seats on the council, resulting in the first stable municipal council in more than a decade. Conrad Sidego of the DA was appointed the new mayor.

In the 2016 local government elections, the DA increased their majority in the council to thirty seats. Gesie van Deventer of the DA was elected as the new mayor. She was re-elected after the 2021 local government elections. Van Deventer announced her retirement from politics in October 2024, and she was succeeded by deputy mayor Jeremy Fasser.
