= Kylemore, South Africa =

Kylemore
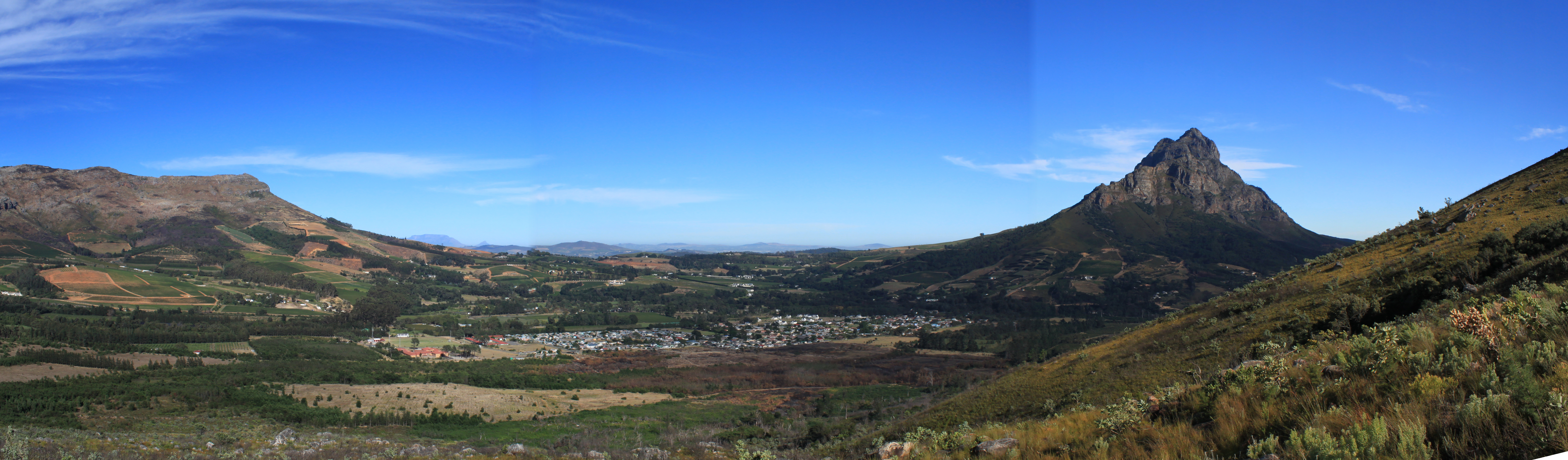
- The town seen from the Groot Drakenstein mountains

- Location within Western Cape Location within South Africa Location within Africa
- Coordinates: 33°55′S 18°57′E
- Country: South Africa
- Province: Western Cape
- District: Cape Winelands
- Municipality: Stellenbosch

Area
  - Total: 0.94 km^{2} (0.36 sq mi)

Population (2011)
  - Total: 4,328
  - Density: 4,600/km^{2} (12,000/sq mi)

Racial makeup (2011)
  - Black African: 4.9%
  - Coloured: 91.7%
  - Indian/Asian: 0.5%
  - White: 2.2%
  - Other: 0.6%

First languages (2011)
  - Afrikaans: 94.6%
  - English: 2.7%
  - Other: 2.7%
- Time zone: UTC+2 (SAST)
- Postal code (street): 7600
- PO box: 7608

Kylemore is a village in the Western Cape of South Africa. It is located in the Cape Winelands, within Helshoogte Pass on the route from Stellenbosch to Franschhoek. It was founded in 1898.

With a population of 6000+ people, the community is largely dependent on employment in the bigger towns, predominantly Stellenbosch, Paarl, and greater Cape Town.

The town is surrounded by mountains and rivers, with walking trails into the neighboring countryside. Rugby is the most popular sport in the town.
