= Klapmuts =

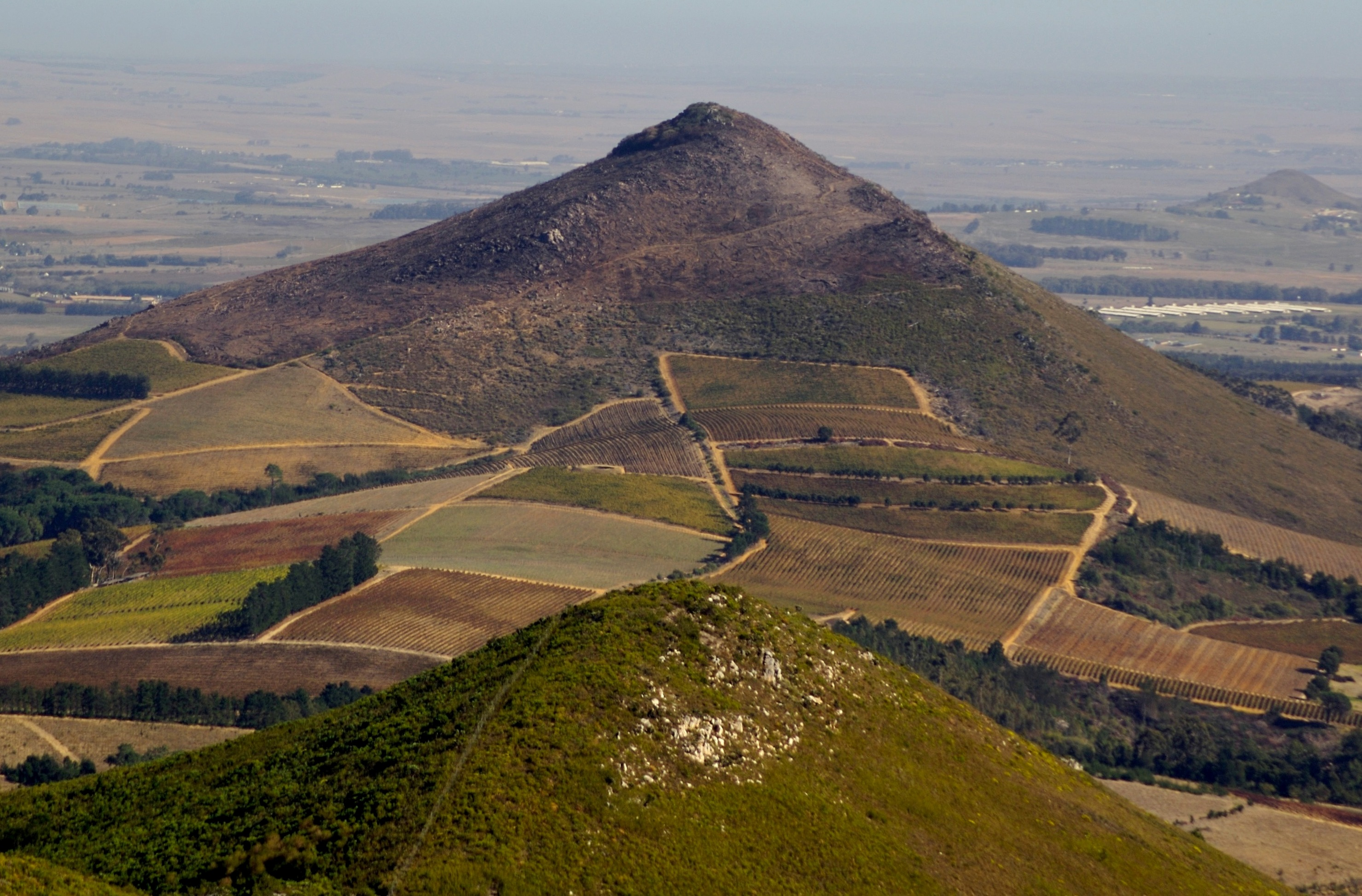
- Klapmuts hill ("Klapmutskop") from which the town gets its name.

- Location within Western Cape Location within South Africa
- Coordinates: 33°48′20″S 18°52′11″E
- Country: South Africa
- Province: Western Cape
- District: Cape Winelands
- Municipality: Stellenbosch

Area
  - Total: 1.76 km^{2} (0.68 sq mi)

Population (2011)
  - Total: 7,703
  - Density: 4,380/km^{2} (11,300/sq mi)

Racial makeup (2011)
  - Black African: 33.5%
  - Coloured: 64.2%
  - Indian/Asian: 0.3%
  - White: 1.0%
  - Other: 1.0%

First languages (2011)
  - Afrikaans: 72.2%
  - Xhosa: 21.6%
  - Sotho: 2.4%
  - English: 1.9%
  - Other: 1.9%
- Time zone: UTC+2 (SAST)
- PO box: 7625

Klapmuts is the name of both a hill, and a town which formed at its foot. They are located in Cape Winelands District Municipality in the Western Cape province of South Africa.

== Klapmuts town ==
Klapmuts is a little town just off the R44 road between Stellenbosch and Wellington, as well as the R101 road between Kraaifontein and Paarl. It is well known for its surrounding wine farms.

In 1683 the Dutch East India Company and established a cattle stock-farm at Klapmuts. Finding Khoisan to trade with proved a difficult task so the VOC employed a chieftain named Klaas (Rank Capt) to find Khoisan and negotiate trade deals on behalf of the Company. In 1684 trading posts were established at Kuilen, Diep River, Vissers Hok, Riet Vlei, Hottentots Holland, Tygerberg and Klapmuts.

== Klapmutskop hill and conservancy ==
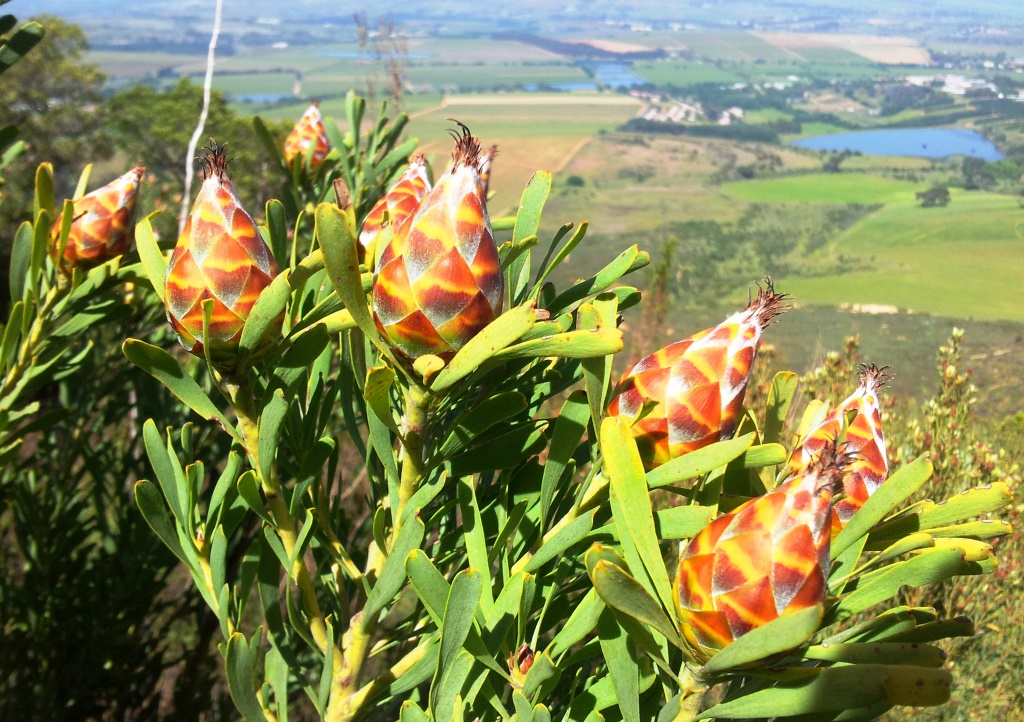
Fynbos vegetation on Klapmuts hill.

Klapmutskop, the isolated hill which stands over the town, is a unique combination of Shale, Sandstone, Granite and Conglomerate. Its natural vegetation is a complex mixture, due to the underlying soils. It is predominantly the threatened Swartland Shale Renosterveld as well as several other vegetation types on the other soil types. The crown of the hill has an ancient relict remnant of Afrotemperate forest with a population of rare Breede River Yellowwood trees - stunted by the unique environment.

In 2004, a conservancy was set up over the hill by the surrounding farms, which serve as curators of the area and its wildlife.
