= Gesie van Deventer =

South African politician, farmer and advocate (born 1958)

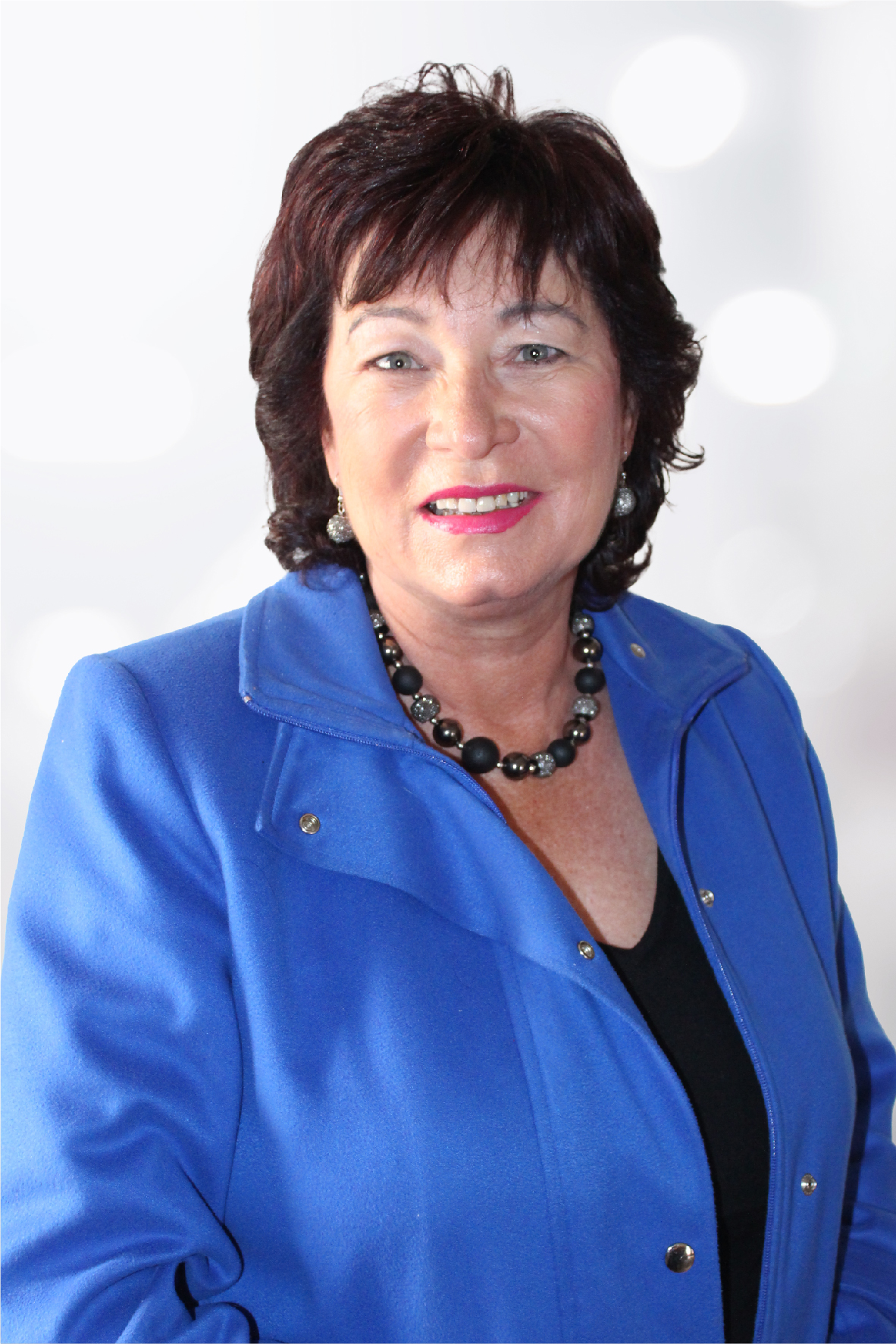
- Van Deventer in 2021

Executive Mayor of the Stellenbosch Local Municipality
- In office 17 August 2016 – 28 November 2024
- Deputy: Jeremy Fasser; Nyaniso Jindela; Wilhelmina Petersen; Nyaniso Jindela
- Preceded by: Conrad Sidego
- Succeeded by: Jeremy Fasser

Executive Mayor of the Drakenstein Local Municipality
- In office May 2011 – 11 May 2016
- Deputy: Conrad Poole
- Preceded by: Charmaine Manuel
- Succeeded by: Conrad Poole

Personal details
- Born: Gesina Maria Magdalena van Deventer; 24 September 1958 (age 68) Vanrhynsdorp, Cape Province, South Africa
- Party: Democratic Alliance
- Children: 2
- Education: Stellenbosch University; Elsenburg College of Agriculture
- Profession: Politician; Advocate; Farmer

Gesina Maria Magdalena "Gesie" van Deventer (born 24 September 1958) is a South African retired politician, farmer and advocate who served as the Executive Mayor of the Stellenbosch Local Municipality from 2016 until 2024. A member of the Democratic Alliance, she previously served as the Executive Mayor of the neighbouring Drakenstein Local Municipality from 2011 to 2016.

== Early life and career ==
Van Deventer was born on 24 September 1958 in Vanrhynsdorp in the former Cape Province (now known as the Western Cape). She started working at a young age to support her family. She went on to study at Stellenbosch University and earned two degrees. In 1981, she qualified as an advocate and was admitted to the Supreme Court of South Africa.

Van Deventer then decided to pursue wine as a career. She enrolled as one of the first female students at the Elsenburg College of Agriculture in 1990. The following year, she earned her diploma in viticulture and botany (cum laude), which she followed up with a diploma as cellar master and winemaker in 1992. Over the next few years, she was a winemaker fulltime.

In 2001, she won the Winemaker & Female Farmer of the Year Award. In 2003, she won the Farmer of the Year title for both genders and was appointed as the chairperson of the Paarl Vintners Board of Directors.

Her surname derives from the Dutch town of Deventer.

== Political career ==
Van Deventer later joined the Democratic Alliance. She was nominated as the party's mayoral candidate for the Drakenstein Local Municipality for the local government elections of 18 May 2011. The DA won a majority of seats on the council, defeating an ANC-led coalition that had previously governed the municipality. Van Deventer was then elected mayor with former Independent Democrats councillor Conrad Poole as her deputy.

Van Deventer was elected to the Western Cape Provincial Parliament in the 2014 provincial election, however, she decided to give up her seat in order to continue serving as mayor of the Drakenstein. Former Cederberg Local Municipality councillor Matlhodi Maseko was appointed to take up Van Deventer's seat in the provincial parliament.

In 2016, Stellenbosch mayor Conrad Sidego announced that he would not be running for re-election as mayor. Van Deventer was nominated as the DA's mayoral candidate for Stellenbosch and resigned as Drakenstein mayor in May 2016. Her deputy, Conrad Poole, was voted in as her successor. The DA achieved a landslide victory in the Stellenbosch Local Municipality in the election on 3 August 2016. On 15 August 2016, Van Deventer was elected mayor with councillor Nyaniso Jindela as her deputy.

In November 2019, Jindela was elected speaker while councillor Wilhelmina Petersen was elected deputy mayor. A year later, Jindela and Petersen swapped positions.

In September 2021, Van Deventer was renominated as the DA's mayoral candidate for the Stellenbosch Local Municipality for the election of 1 November 2021. The DA retained control of the municipality, albeit with a smaller majority in the municipal council.

On 15 November 2021, Van Deventer was re-elected as mayor for a second five-year term. Her re-election made history as she is the first mayor of the Stellenbosch municipality to serve two consecutive terms.

In October 2024, Van Deventer announced that she would be retiring from politics at the end of November 2024. Deputy mayor Jeremy fasser was elected to succeed her as mayor of the municipality.

== Personal life ==
Van Deventer is married. She has two sons.
