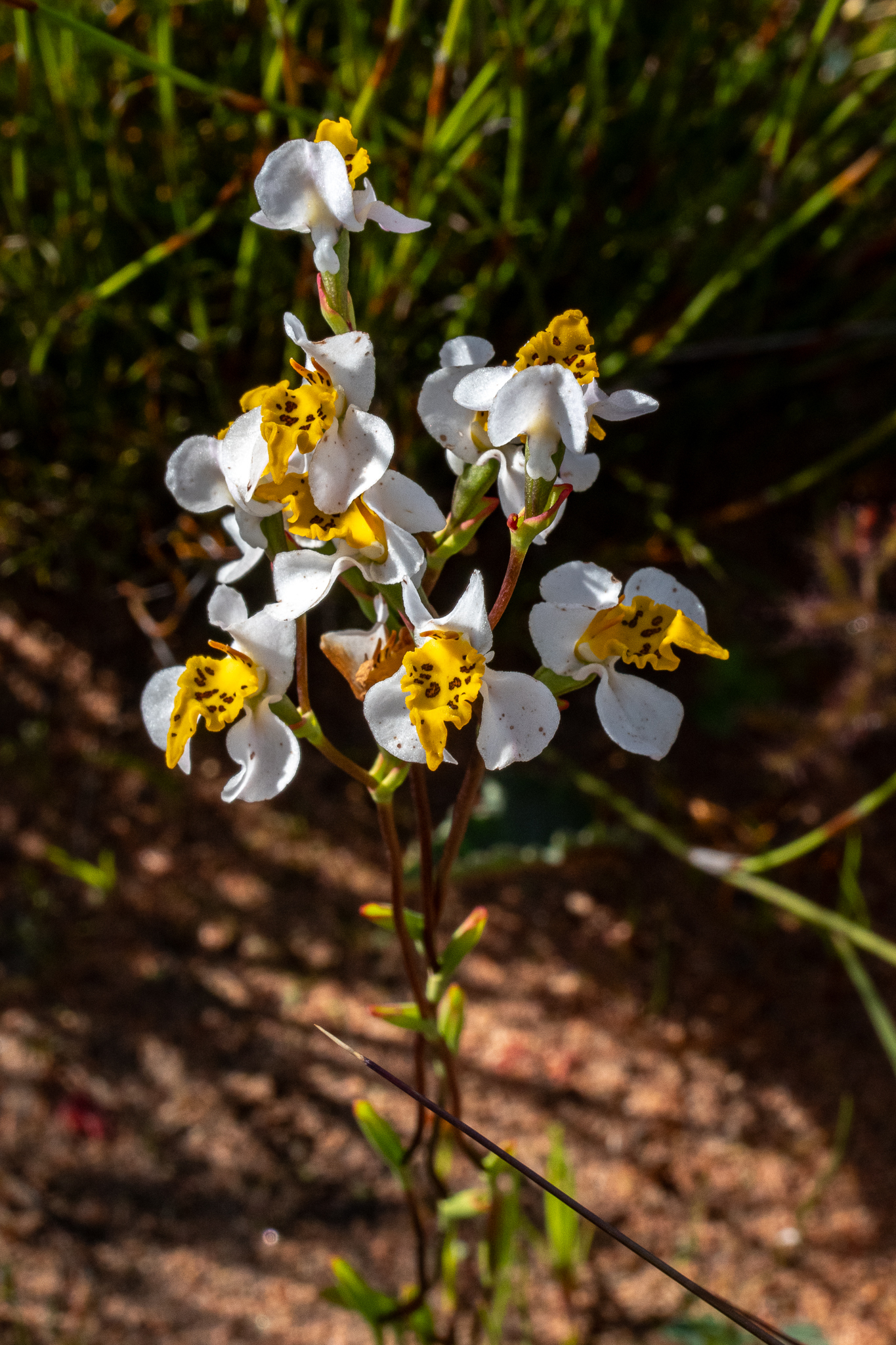

Scientific classification
- Kingdom: Plantae
- Clade: Tracheophytes
- Clade: Angiosperms
- Clade: Monocots
- Order: Asparagales
- Family: Orchidaceae
- Subfamily: Orchidoideae
- Genus: Disa
- Species: D. flexuosa

Binomial name
- Disa flexuosa (L.) Sw.

Synonyms
- Orchis flexuosa L.; Orchis undulata Poir.; Satyrium flexuosum (L.) Thunb.; Schizodium flexuosum (L.) Lindl.

= Disa flexuosa =

Species of flowering plant

Disa flexuosa is a perennial plant and geophyte belonging to the genus Disa and is part of the fynbos. The plant is endemic to the Northern Cape and Western Cape. The plant is extinct on the Cape Peninsula. It now occurs from the Western Cape lowlands, from Nieuwoudtville southwards to Caledon and eastwards to the Hex River Valley. There are 36 subpopulations on record, ten of which may no longer exist. The plant is threatened by urban development, crop cultivation and invasive plants.
