= Raithby =

Raithby may refer to:

- Raithby, South Africa – village in South Africa
- Raithby by Spilsby – village near Spilsby in England
- Raithby cum Maltby – village near Louth in England
