= Saron, South Africa =

Saron
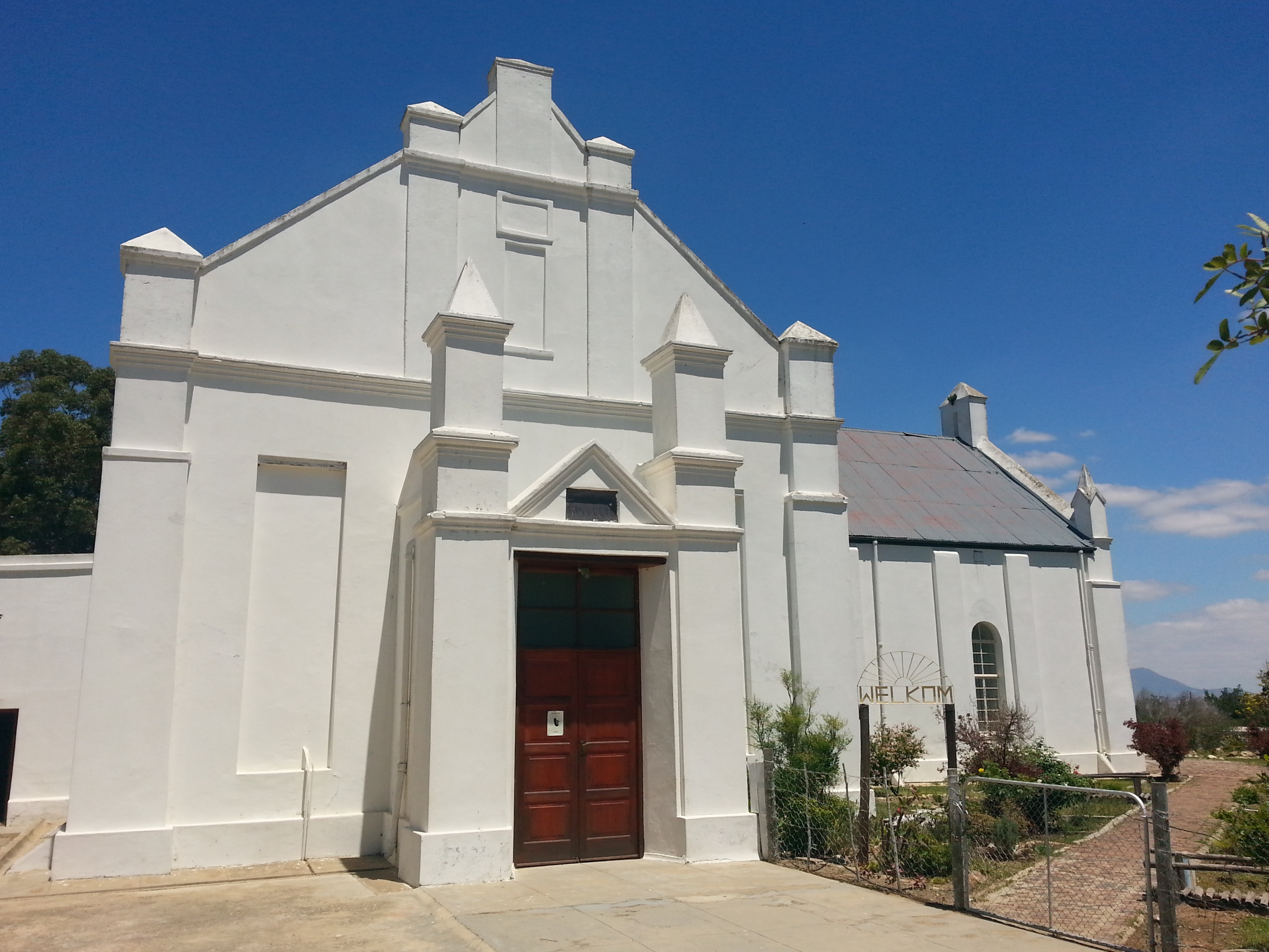
- Mission Church in Saron

- Location within Western Cape Location within South Africa
- Coordinates: 33°10.86′S 19°0.6′E
- Country: South Africa
- Province: Western Cape
- District: Cape Winelands
- Municipality: Drakenstein

Area
  - Total: 2.13 km^{2} (0.82 sq mi)

Population (2011)
  - Total: 7,843
  - Density: 3,680/km^{2} (9,540/sq mi)

Racial makeup (2011)
  - Black African: 1.8%
  - Coloured: 97.3%
  - Indian/Asian: 0.2%
  - White: 0.1%
  - Other: 0.6%

First languages (2011)
  - Afrikaans: 96.8%
  - Other: 3.2%
- Time zone: UTC+2 (SAST)
- Postal code (street): 6812
- PO box: 6812
- Area code: 023

Saron is a town in the Western Cape province of South Africa.

A Mission Station can be found at the foot of the Saronsberg in the Tulbagh district, about 20 km south of Porterville. The Mission Station was established by the Rhenish Missionary Society in 1848 by Johannes Heinrich Kulpmann; it was later taken over by the Dutch Reformed Church in 1945. The name, Afrikaans for Sharon, is of Biblical origin, meaning 'flats' or 'plain'.

On 30 November 2013, Heritage Western Cape declared the historic core of the Saron Mission Station as a provincial heritage site.
