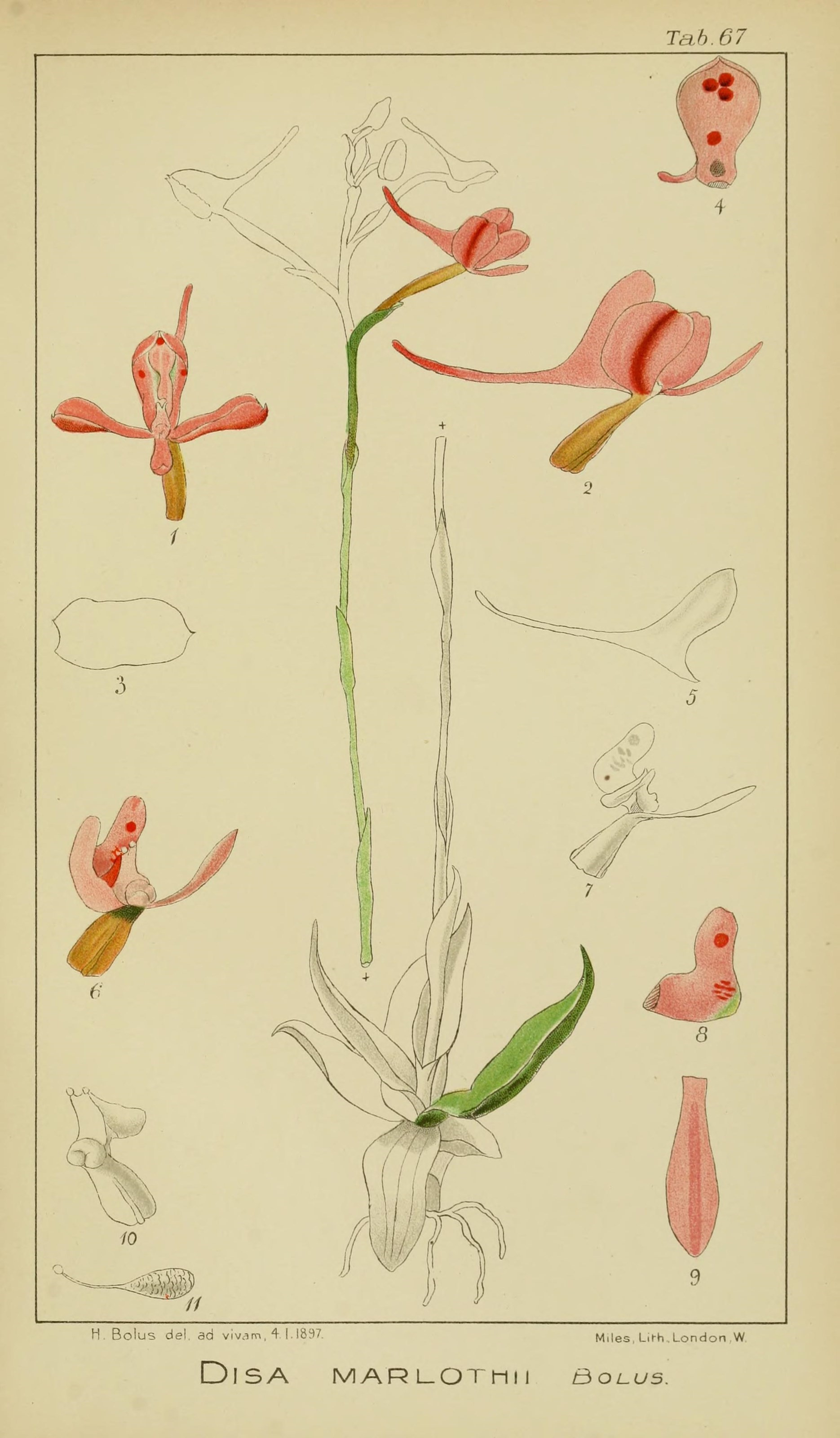

Scientific classification
- Kingdom: Plantae
- Clade: Tracheophytes
- Clade: Angiosperms
- Clade: Monocots
- Order: Asparagales
- Family: Orchidaceae
- Subfamily: Orchidoideae
- Genus: Disa
- Species: D. marlothii

Binomial name
- Disa marlothii Bolus

= Disa marlothii =

Species of flowering plant

Disa marlothii is a perennial plant and geophyte belonging to the genus Disa and is part of the fynbos. The plant is endemic to the Eastern Cape and the Western Cape. It occurs in the Hex River Valley, Koue Bokkeveld, central Cederberg and Tsitsikamma Mountains. It grows at altitudes of 600 - 1 300 m along streams between the rocks. There are six subpopulations that are widely separated and each consists of less than 20 plants. The species has no threats but is considered rare.
