= Aneplasa facies =

Eastern Cape Aneplasa Ground Spider

Conservation status
- Least Concern (SANBI Red List)

Scientific classification
- Kingdom: Animalia
- Phylum: Arthropoda
- Subphylum: Chelicerata
- Class: Arachnida
- Order: Araneae
- Infraorder: Araneomorphae
- Family: Gnaphosidae
- Genus: Aneplasa
- Species: A. facies

Binomial name
- Aneplasa facies Tucker, 1923

Species of spider

Aneplasa facies is a species of spider in the family Gnaphosidae. It is endemic to South Africa and is commonly known as the Eastern Cape Aneplasa ground spider.

== Distribution ==
Aneplasa facies is distributed across two South African provinces: Eastern Cape and Western Cape. Notable localities include Grahamstown, Uitenhage, Asante Sana Private Game Reserve, and Swartberg Nature Reserve.

== Habitat and ecology ==
The species is a free-living ground dweller recorded from Thicket and Grassland biomes at altitudes ranging from 66 to 1,479 m above sea level.

== Conservation ==
Aneplasa facies is listed as Least Concern by the South African National Biodiversity Institute. Despite males not being known, samples of females show that this species is widespread. The species is protected in Asante Sana Private Game Reserve and Swartberg Nature Reserve.

== Taxonomy ==
The species was originally described by R.W.E. Tucker in 1923 from Grahamstown in the Eastern Cape. It has not been revised since the original description and is known only from females. The species resembles Aneplasa balnearia.
