= Erica leucosiphon =

Scientific classification
- Kingdom: Plantae
- Clade: Tracheophytes
- Clade: Angiosperms
- Clade: Eudicots
- Clade: Asterids
- Order: Ericales
- Family: Ericaceae
- Genus: Erica
- Species: E. leucosiphon

Binomial name
- Erica leucosiphon L.Bolus

Species of flowering plant

Erica leucosiphon is a plant belonging to the genus Erica and is part of the fynbos. The species is endemic to the Western Cape and occurs in the Witzenberg. The plant grows in rock crevices in large rocks. The nature of the plant's habitat provides protection and the habitat is stable. The plant is considered rare.
