= Pniel, Western Cape =

Pniel
- Location within Western Cape Location within South Africa
- Coordinates: 33°54′S 18°57′E
- Country: South Africa
- Province: Western Cape
- District: Cape Winelands
- Municipality: Stellenbosch

Area
  - Total: 0.59 km^{2} (0.23 sq mi)

Population (2011)
  - Total: 1,975
  - Density: 3,300/km^{2} (8,700/sq mi)

Racial makeup (2011)
  - Black African: 1.2%
  - Coloured: 97.7%
  - Indian/Asian: 0.5%
  - White: 0.5%
  - Other: 0.3%

First languages (2011)
  - Afrikaans: 92.0%
  - English: 6.7%
  - Other: 1.3%
- Time zone: UTC+2 (SAST)
- Postal code (street): 7681
- PO box: 7681

Pniel is a settlement in Cape Winelands District Municipality in the Western Cape province of South Africa.

It is a settlement and United Congregational Church of Southern Africa (UCCSA) mission station between Stellenbosch and Franschhoek, established in 1843. The name is of biblical origin (Genesis 32:30), referring to the place where Jacob wrestled with God; it means 'face of God'.
