= Languedoc, South Africa =

Languedoc
- Location within Western Cape Location within South Africa
- Coordinates: 33°53′56″S 18°57′57″E
- Country: South Africa
- Province: Western Cape
- District: Cape Winelands
- Municipality: Stellenbosch

Area
  - Total: 0.64 km^{2} (0.25 sq mi)

Population (2011)
  - Total: 4,289
  - Density: 6,700/km^{2} (17,000/sq mi)

Racial makeup (2011)
  - Black African: 22.4%
  - Coloured: 76.8%
  - Other: 0.7%

First languages (2011)
  - Afrikaans: 79.2%
  - Xhosa: 17.1%
  - English: 1.3%
  - Other: 2.4%
- Time zone: UTC+2 (SAST)

Languedoc is a settlement in Cape Winelands District Municipality in the Western Cape province of South Africa.
