= Op-die-Berg =

- Location within Western Cape Location within South Africa
- Coordinates: 33°01′S 19°17′E
- Country: South Africa
- Province: Western Cape
- District: Cape Winelands
- Municipality: Witzenberg

Area
  - Total: 1.04 km^{2} (0.40 sq mi)
- Elevation: 965 m (3,166 ft)

Population (2011)
  - Total: 1,531
  - Density: 1,470/km^{2} (3,810/sq mi)

Racial makeup (2011)
  - Black African: 6.6%
  - Coloured: 89.2%
  - Indian/Asian: 0.3%
  - White: 3.9%
  - Other: 0.1%

First languages (2011)
  - Afrikaans: 96.5%
  - Xhosa: 1.3%
  - Other: 2.2%
- Time zone: UTC+2 (SAST)

Op-die-Berg is a settlement in Cape Winelands District Municipality in the Western Cape province of South Africa. It is located north of Ceres in the Kouebokkeveld region, synonymous with cherry orchards and occasional heavy snowfalls in winter.
