= Mbekweni =

- Location within Western Cape Location within South Africa
- Coordinates: 33.68°S 18.99°E
- Country: South Africa
- Province: Western Cape
- District municipality: Cape Winelands
- Local municipality: Drakenstein

Area
  - Total: 2.04 km^{2} (0.79 sq mi)

Population (2011)
  - Total: 30,875
  - Density: 15,100/km^{2} (39,200/sq mi)
- Time zone: UTC+2 (SAST)
- Postal code: 7626

Mbekweni is a township situated between Wellington and Paarl in the Western Cape province of South Africa. As of 2011 it had a population of 30,875 residents in 8,339 households. Paarl, Mbekweni and Wellington form a continuous urban area within the Drakenstein Municipality.
