= Jamestown, Western Cape =

Jamestown
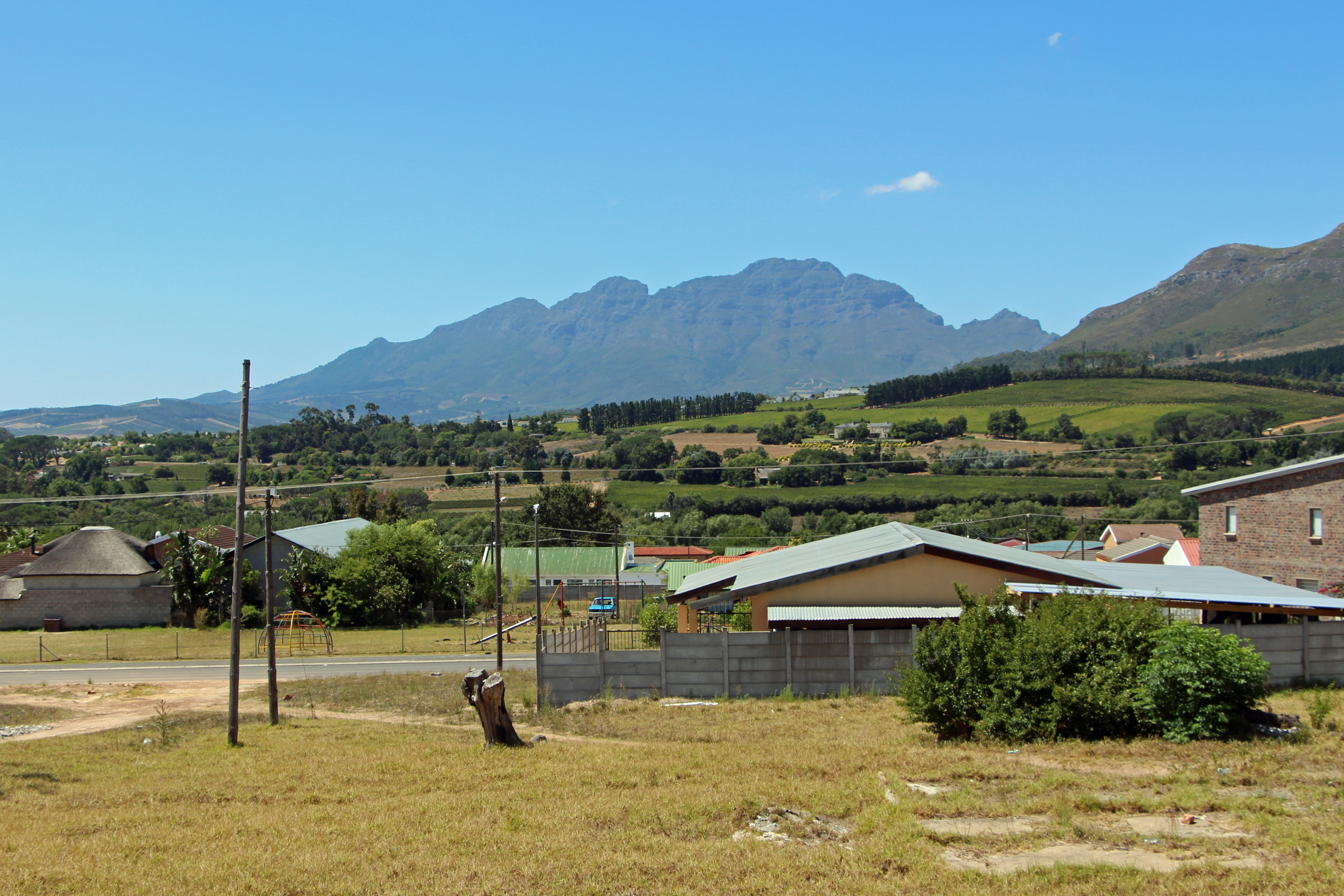
- View over Jamestown towards Stellenbosch

- Location within Western Cape Location within South Africa
- Coordinates: 33.979°S 18.848°E
- Country: South Africa
- Province: Western Cape
- District: Cape Winelands
- Municipality: Stellenbosch
- Established: 1902

Area
  - Total: 1.62 km^{2} (0.63 sq mi)

Population (2011)
  - Total: 2,840
  - Density: 1,750/km^{2} (4,540/sq mi)

Racial makeup (2011)
  - Black African: 3.3%
  - Coloured: 84.8%
  - Indian/Asian: 0.5%
  - White: 10.9%
  - Other: 0.5%

First languages (2011)
  - Afrikaans: 89.8%
  - English: 7.5%
  - Other: 2.7%
- Time zone: UTC+2 (SAST)
- Postal code (street): Jamestown 7600
- PO box: Webersvallei 7614
- Area code: 021

Jamestown, also known as Webersvallei ("Weber's Valley") plus Mountain View, is a quiet rural settlement on the southern outskirts of Stellenbosch in the Cape Winelands District of the Western Cape province of South Africa. It is situated next to Blaauwklippen Vineyards, on the eastern side of route R44 from Stellenbosch to Somerset West and the Strand coastal resort. The main access from the R44 is via Webersvallei Road, the main road in Jamestown with watererven – long, narrow agricultural plots on the south bank of Blouklip River – on the north side of the road and residential plots on the south side of the road.

== History ==
Over time, Jamestown has transformed from a subsistence farming village into a primarily residential area as residents have sought work elsewhere in order to survive. A heritage committee was established in 2010 to document the history of Jamestown for the benefit of future generations, to restore old buildings and to facilitate increased involvement in local festivals and commemorative events.

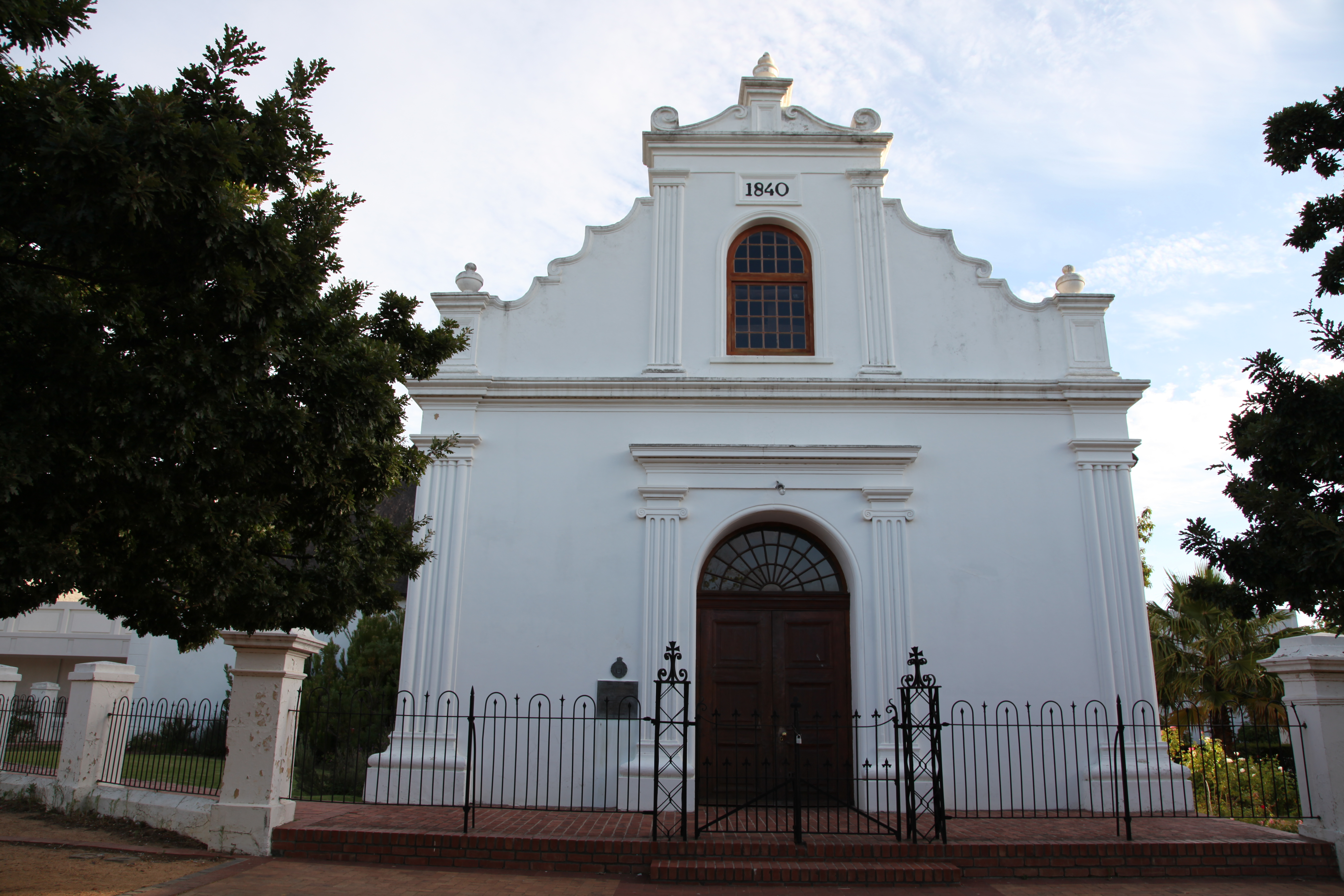
Rhenish Mission Church in Stellenbosch where Jacob Weber served as minister

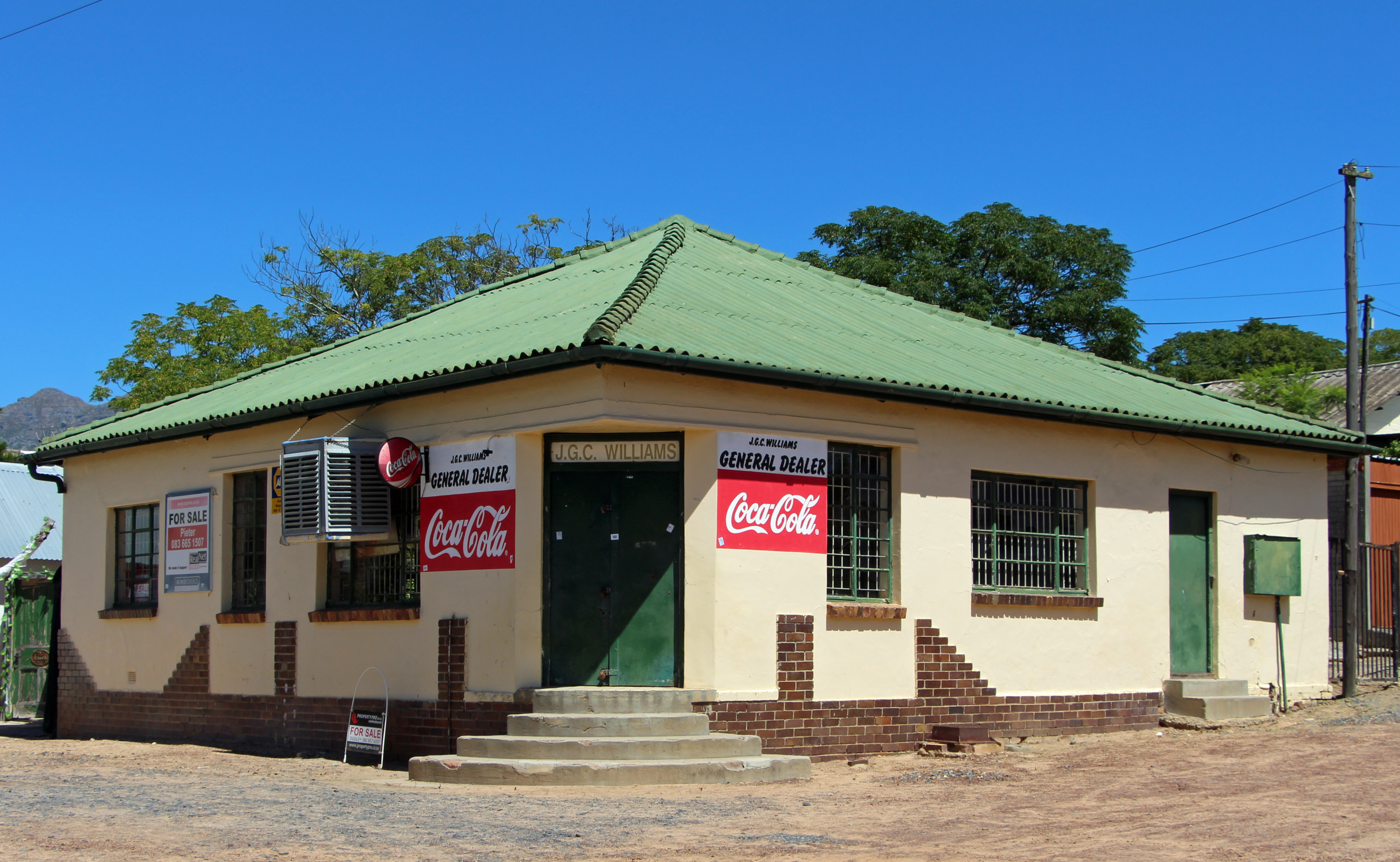
General Dealer on Webersvallei Road opened by JGC Williams in 1946

The village was named after James Rattray (1859–1938), a Stellenbosch businessman who owned a butchery in Dorp Street. He was the grandson of Scottish teacher James Rattray (c. 1795–1864) who immigrated to the Cape Colony in 1822, one of several British people recruited to the colony by Scottish missionary George Thom at the request of the governor Lord Charles Somerset. In 1902 Rattray and Rhenish missionary Jacob Weber (1856–1937), who was born in Lennep in Germany and sent to Stellenbosch in 1882, acquired a portion of the Blaauwklippen farm. The land was divided into plots and sold to coloured families, and most of the associated debt was paid off within twenty years. Street names such as Everbearing, Festival, Nared, Pajaro, Rolinda, Tiobelle, Titan, Torrey, Tribute and Whiteheart in the residential area are based on strawberry varieties, after the main crop grown there since 1902. Other crops grown there include beans, lettuce, potatoes and tomatoes.

Despite Weber's role in the establishment of Jamestown, it is not a mission station per se. The Rhenish Mission Church built in 1823 is situated next to Die Braak, the common in the Stellenbosch town centre. A small church was inaugurated in Jamestown in 1923, which initially also served as a school for the area. Some of the villagers served in the Second World War. In 1946 JGC Williams opened the General Dealer in Webersvallei Road, which closed its doors in 2012 when his sons retired. Jamestown was designated a coloured area under apartheid segregation laws, and the majority of the residents were not subjected to forced removals. The 1970s saw the first tarred road and the arrival of electricity for those who could afford it. Dominoes were traditionally played by the men in the village. The Burnley soccer club established in 1932 and the Young Gardens soccer club in 1940 merged in 1973 to form Jamestown Aurora Athletic Football Club. Jamestown has a long musical tradition which is a source of community pride. Christmas is a particularly busy time for the Jamestown Christian string orchestra established in 1967, which was preceded by the Jamestown tickey band.

== Further development ==
Jamestown was incorporated into the greater Stellenbosch Municipality in 1994.

Post apartheid the area experienced considerable rezoning and property development, targeted primarily at the luxury real estate market and not well integrated with the original residential area.

The area has also seen the growth of informal settlements inhabited by agricultural labourers who work on surrounding farms and their families.

== Notable people from Jamestown ==
- Keenan Davidse – professional golfer
- Joyene Isaacs – head of the Western Cape Department of Agriculture (appointed January 2002)
- Marie Stander – figurative and portrait artist
