= Aneplasa primaris =

Scientific classification
- Kingdom: Animalia
- Phylum: Arthropoda
- Subphylum: Chelicerata
- Class: Arachnida
- Order: Araneae
- Infraorder: Araneomorphae
- Family: Gnaphosidae
- Genus: Aneplasa
- Species: A. primaris

Binomial name
- Aneplasa primaris Tucker, 1923

Species of spider

Aneplasa primaris is a species of spider in the family Gnaphosidae. It is endemic to the Western Cape of South Africa.

== Distribution ==
Aneplasa primaris is endemic to the Western Cape province of South Africa. It is known from three localities: Matjiesfontein, Montagu, and Worcester (Rabiesberg), all sampled prior to 1923.

== Habitat and ecology ==
The species is a ground dweller known from Fynbos and Succulent Karoo biomes at altitudes ranging from 22 to 912 m above sea level.

== Description ==
The carapace is medium brown, black-rimmed, and with a slightly darker lateral band on each side between border and centre. The border and central portion are clothed with whitish hairs, remainder with dark hairs. The abdomen has the usual light serrated median band, dark edged and more conspicuous posteriorly. The legs are a little paler than the carapace. Total length is 5 mm.

== Conservation ==
Aneplasa primaris is listed as Data Deficient for taxonomic reasons. No new material has been sampled since the original collection, and more sampling is needed to collect females and determine the species' range.

== Taxonomy ==
The species was originally described by R.W.E. Tucker in 1923 from Matjiesfontein in the Western Cape. It has not been revised since the original description and is known only from males.
