= Aneplasa =

Scientific classification
- Kingdom: Animalia
- Phylum: Arthropoda
- Subphylum: Chelicerata
- Class: Arachnida
- Order: Araneae
- Infraorder: Araneomorphae
- Family: Gnaphosidae
- Genus: Aneplasa; Tucker, 1923

Type species
- A. balnearia Tucker, 1923

Species
- 8, see text

Genus of spiders

Aneplasa is a genus of African ground spiders that was first described by R.W.E. Tucker in 1923, but might actually be a junior synonym of Nomisia.

== Description ==
Spiders in the genus Aneplasa is have a total length of 5-6 mm. The carapace is long and oval, produced anteriorly and moderately convex. The thoracic stria is short and posterior in position.

The anterior row of eyes, seen from in front, is procurved, with median eyes subequal to the laterals. The posterior row is little wider than the anterior row and recurved, with laterals subequal to anterior laterals. The medians are opaque, smaller, and nearer to each other than to the laterals. The clypeus equals or exceeds the diameter of an anterior lateral eye. The maxillae are slightly less tapering and inclined inwards.

The abdomen is oval with inferior spinnerets bearing 4-5 apical tubules. The median spinnerets lack a tuberculate base. The legs are strong and well spined, with all tarsi well scopulate. The tarsal claws have a uniseriate row of strong teeth.

== Species ==
As of September 2025 it contains eight species found in South Africa, East Africa, or Angola:

- Aneplasa balnearia Tucker, 1923 (type) – South Africa
- Aneplasa borlei Lessert, 1933 – Angola
- Aneplasa facies Tucker, 1923 – South Africa
- Aneplasa interrogationis Tucker, 1923 – South Africa
- Aneplasa nigra Tucker, 1923 – South Africa
- Aneplasa primaris Tucker, 1923 – South Africa
- Aneplasa sculpturata Tucker, 1923 – South Africa
- Aneplasa strandi Caporiacco, 1947 – East Africa
