= Aneplasa interrogationis =

Pale Aneplasa Ground Spider

Conservation status
- Least Concern (SANBI Red List)

Scientific classification
- Kingdom: Animalia
- Phylum: Arthropoda
- Subphylum: Chelicerata
- Class: Arachnida
- Order: Araneae
- Infraorder: Araneomorphae
- Family: Gnaphosidae
- Genus: Aneplasa
- Species: A. interrogationis

Binomial name
- Aneplasa interrogationis Tucker, 1923

Species of spider

Aneplasa interrogationis is a species of spider in the family Gnaphosidae. It is endemic to South Africa and is commonly known as the pale Aneplasa ground spider.

== Distribution ==
Aneplasa interrogationis is distributed across two South African provinces: Limpopo and Western Cape. It has been recorded from Blouberg Nature Reserve, Little Leigh in the Western Soutpansberg, and Montagu Baths.

== Habitat and ecology ==
The species is a ground dweller known from Savanna and Succulent Karoo biomes at altitudes ranging from 222 to 1,146 m above sea level.

== Description ==
The carapace is pale yellowish brown, dark-rimmed, and with infuscate mottling over the entire surface. The sternum, coxae, and legs are paler than the carapace. The abdomen is uniform dull testaceous, slightly infuscate posteriorly.

== Conservation ==
Aneplasa interrogationis is listed as Least Concern by the South African National Biodiversity Institute. Despite males not being known, samples of females show that this species is widespread. The species is protected in the Blouberg Nature Reserve.

== Taxonomy ==
The species was originally described by R.W.E. Tucker in 1923 from Montagu in the Western Cape. It has not been revised since the original description and is known only from females.
