= Conrad Poole =

South African politician (b. 1967)

Conrad Poole MP
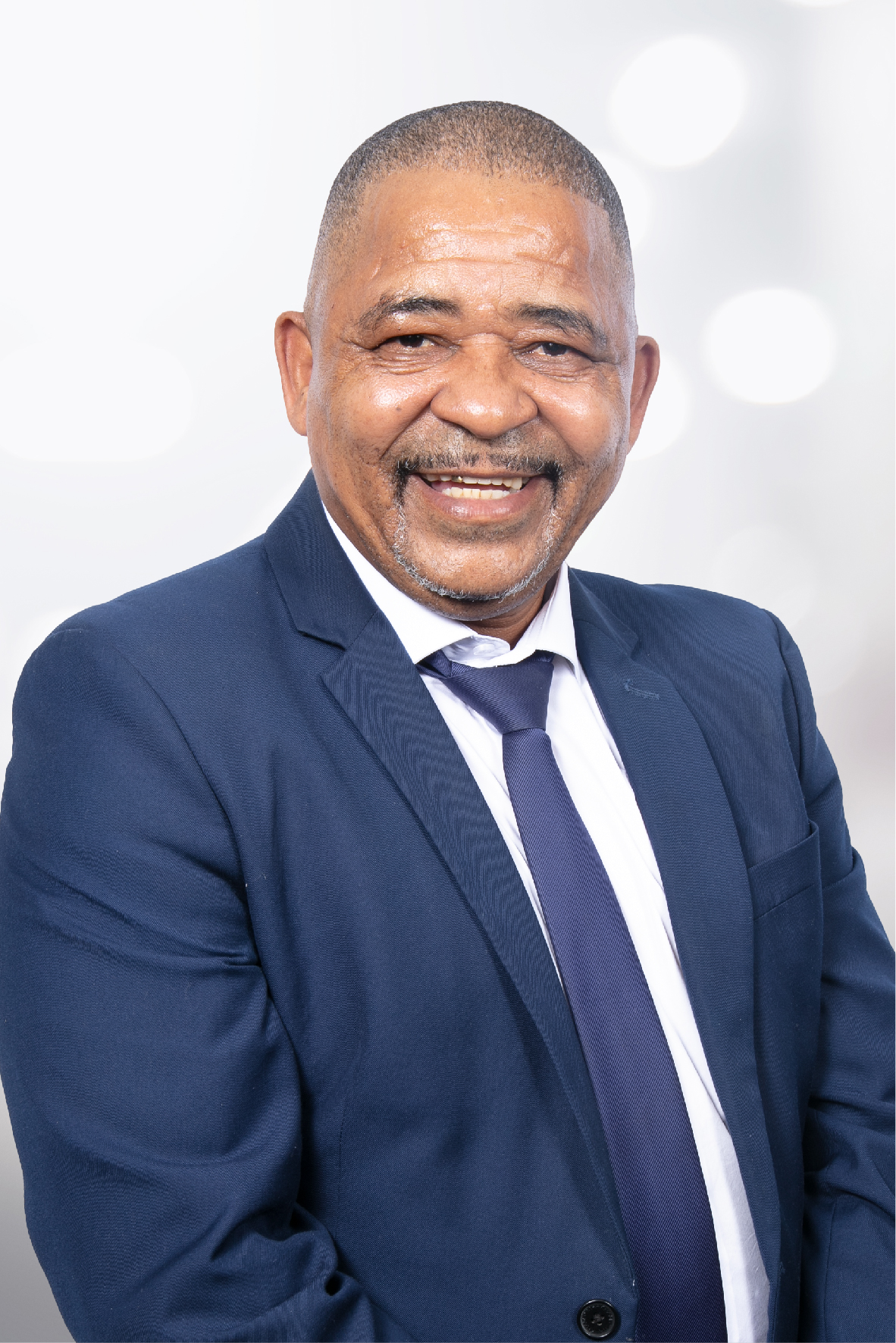
- Poole in 2021

Member of the National Assembly of South Africa
- Incumbent
- Assumed office 14 June 2024

Member of the Western Cape Provincial Parliament
- In office 6 March 2024 – 28 May 2024
- Preceded by: Dan Plato

Mayor of Drakenstein
- In office 16 May 2016 – 28 February 2024; Acting: 11 May 2016 - 16 May 2016
- Deputy: Gert Combrink
- Preceded by: Gesie van Deventer
- Succeeded by: Stephen Korabie

Deputy Mayor of Drakenstein
- In office 18 May 2011 – 16 May 2016
- Preceded by: Wilhelm Nothnagel
- Succeeded by: Gert Combrink

Personal details
- Born: Conrad James Poole; 12 February 1967 (age 59) Paarl, Cape Province, South Africa
- Party: Democratic Alliance (2010 - present)
- Other political affiliations: Independent Democrats (Before 2010)
- Spouse: Jené Poole (m. 1990)
- Children: 3
- Education: L.K. Zeeman Primary School; Paulus Joubert Senior Secondary School
- Occupation: Politician; Pastor

Conrad James Poole (born 12 February 1967) is a South African politician who has been a Member of the National Assembly of South Africa since June 2024, representing the Democratic Alliance.

Poole had previously served as the deputy mayor of the Drakenstein Local Municipality from May 2011 until May 2016 and then as the municipality's mayor from May 2016 until his removal in a motion of no confidence in February 2024. He then proceeded to serve as a member of the Western Cape Provincial Parliament from March 2024 until May 2024 when he was elected as a Member of Parliament.

== Early life and education ==
Conrad James Poole was born on 12 February 1967 in Paarl. He completed his primary school education at L.K. Zeeman Primary School and his secondary school education at Paulus Joubert Senior Secondary School.

Poole obtained his Cum Laude Diploma from the Paarl Bible School in 2010. He is currently fulfilling his second-year course. Poole was first employed by Berg River Textiles, due to his family having financial issues. He became a shop steward for the Southern African Clothing and Textile Workers Union, and he was soon promoted to the post of supervisor.

== Political career ==
In 2007, he was elected a ward councillor for the Independent Democrats. As a member of the Independent Democrats, he served as chairperson in all three (municipal, provincial and national) of the party's political structures. He has received several awards from the Independent Democrats. He joined the Democratic Alliance in 2010, and the party appointed him as Drakenstein constituency chair.

In 2011, he was elected Deputy Mayor of the Drakenstein Local Municipality. He served alongside Mayor Gesie van Deventer until Van Deventer resigned in 2016 to accept the position of Mayor of Stellenbosch Local Municipality. Poole served as acting Mayor from 11 May 2016 until he was officially elected and sworn in as Mayor on 16 May 2016 at a special council meeting at the Huguenot Community Hall. Gert Combrink succeeded him as Deputy Mayor.

In August 2016, he won re-election as Mayor of the Drakenstein Local Municipality as the Democratic Alliance increased its seat total in the municipality.

Poole was elected to the DA's provincial executive committee as an additional member.

On 3 September 2021, Poole was nominated as the DA's mayoral candidate for the Drakenstein for a second term ahead of the election on 1 November. The DA retained control of the municipality, with a decrease in support. On 15 November 2021, Poole was re-elected as mayor.

Facing allegations of corruption, Poole was removed in a motion of no confidence during a council meeting on 28 February 2024.

Shortly afterwards, Poole resigned from the Drakenstein council as the DA selected him to fill the casual vacancy that arose in the Western Cape Provincial Parliament when former DA MPP Dan Plato resigned to join the People's Movement for Change. Poole was sworn in as a Member of the Provincial Parliament on 6 March 2024.

On 25 March 2024, the DA revealed their candidate lists and Poole was revealed to be a parliamentary candidate for the party for the general elections on 29 May 2024. He was ranked 30th on the DA's national list, which guarantees him a seat in parliament after the election. Poole was elected to the National Assembly of South Africa at the election.

== Personal life ==
Poole married Jené Poole in 1990. The couple has three children and one grandchild. On 13 April 2019, Poole suffered a stroke.
