= Aneplasa sculpturata =

Scientific classification
- Kingdom: Animalia
- Phylum: Arthropoda
- Subphylum: Chelicerata
- Class: Arachnida
- Order: Araneae
- Infraorder: Araneomorphae
- Family: Gnaphosidae
- Genus: Aneplasa
- Species: A. sculpturata

Binomial name
- Aneplasa sculpturata Tucker, 1923

Species of spider

Aneplasa sculpturata is a species of spider in the family Gnaphosidae. It is endemic to the Western Cape of South Africa.

== Distribution ==
Aneplasa sculpturata is endemic to the Western Cape province of South Africa. It has been recorded from De Hoop Nature Reserve, Matjiesfontein, and Swartberg Nature Reserve (Gamkaskloof).

== Habitat and ecology ==
The species is a ground dweller sampled from the Fynbos biome at altitudes ranging from 266 to 912 m above sea level.

== Description ==
The carapace is light brown and dark-edged, furnished with a narrow border of appressed white hairs down each side, followed by a slightly broader, darker, mottled band with a light median band. The legs are light yellowish brown in colour. The dorsal surface of the abdomen has a light median band that is serrated, a little narrower posteriorly, and dark edged. The lateral portion of the abdomen is narrowly infuscate, especially anteriorly. The median band and remainder of dorsal surface are clothed with cream-coloured setae, while the ventral surface is pale. Total length is 6.5 mm.

== Conservation ==
Aneplasa sculpturata is listed as Data Deficient for taxonomic reasons. The species is protected in the De Hoop Nature Reserve and Swartberg Nature Reserve. More sampling is needed to collect males.

== Taxonomy ==
The species was originally described by R.W.E. Tucker in 1923 from Matjiesfontein in the Western Cape. It has not been revised since the original description and is known only from females.
