= Witzenberg Local Municipality =

Witzenberg
- Local municipality
- Seal

- Location in the Western Cape
- Coordinates: 33°00′S 19°40′E
- Country: South Africa
- Province: Western Cape
- District: Cape Winelands
- Seat: Ceres
- Wards: 12

Government
  - Type: Municipal council
  - Mayor: Trevor Abrahams (DA)

Area
  - Total: 10,753 km^{2} (4,152 sq mi)

Population (2022)
  - Total: 103,765
  - Density: 9.6499/km^{2} (24.993/sq mi)

Racial makeup (2022)
  - Black African: 26.8%
  - Coloured: 63.7%
  - Indian/Asian: 0.2%
  - White African: 7.9%

First languages (2011)
  - Afrikaans: 75.2%
  - Xhosa: 16.6%
  - Sotho: 4.5%
  - English: 2.0%
  - Other: 1.7%
- Time zone: UTC+2 (SAST)
- Municipal code: WC022

Witzenberg Municipality (Afrikaans: Witzenberg Munisipaliteit; Xhosa: uMasipala wase Witzenberg) is a local municipality located within the Cape Winelands District Municipality, in the Western Cape province of South Africa. As of 2022 it had a population of 103,765.

== Geography ==
The municipality covers an area of 10,753 square kilometres (4,152 sq mi) which includes the Land van Waveren (Tulbagh) valley, the Warm Bokkeveld, the Koue Bokkeveld and the Ceres-Karoo. It stretches from the Groot Winterhoek Mountains in the west and the Hex River Mountains in the south as far as the Northern Cape provincial border in the north and east. It abuts on the Hantam Municipality to the north, the Karoo Hoogland Municipality to the northeast, the Laingsburg Municipality to the southeast, the Breede Valley Municipality to the south, the Drakenstein Municipality to the southwest, the Bergrivier Municipality to the west and the Cederberg Municipality to the northwest.

The principal town and location of the municipal head office is Ceres on the eastern slope of the Skurweberg mountains, which as of 2011 has a population of 33,224. To the west of Ceres, on the other side of the mountains, is the Land van Waveren valley with the towns of Wolseley (pop. 12,130) and Tulbagh (pop. 8,969). To the north of Ceres is the town of Prince Alfred Hamlet (pop. 6,810), and further north, in the Koue Bokkeveld, the village of Op-die-Berg (pop. 1,531). There are a number of informal settlements: Pine Valley, Chris Hani, Mooiblom, Zibonele, Polocross, Die Gaatjie and Kleinbegin. In addition in Ward 2, Dwarsrivier, is the settlement of Romansrivier. Other settlements include: Tulbagh Road, Steinthal, Drostdy, Waterval, Kluitjieskraal, Breede River Station, and Prince Alfred Hamlet Station.

== Demographics ==
According to the 2022 South African census, the municipality had a population of 103,765 people, decreasing from 115,946 in 2011. "Coloureds" were the largest ethnic group, at 63.7% of the population, followed by "Black Africans" at 26.8% and "Whites" at 7.9%.

== History ==
At the end of the apartheid era, in the area that is today the Witzenberg Municipality there were municipal councils for Ceres, Wolseley, Tulbagh and Prince Alfred Hamlet. These councils were elected by the white residents, while the coloured residents of Ceres, Tulbagh and Wolseley were governed by management committees subordinate to the white councils. The township of Nduli near Ceres had a town council established under the Black Local Authorities Act, 1982. The remaining rural areas were served by the Breërivier Regional Services Council.

While the negotiations to end apartheid were taking place a process was established for local authorities to agree on voluntary mergers. The Tulbagh municipality and management committee took part in this process, merging to form a new non-racial municipality in October 1993.

After the national elections of 1994 a process of local government transformation began, in which negotiations were held between the existing local authorities, political parties, and local community organisations. As a result of these negotiations, the existing local authorities were dissolved and transitional local councils (TLCs) were created for each town and village.

- Tulbagh TLC replaced the merged Tulbagh Municipality as well as the Gouda Municipality (which lies outside of the area that is now Witzenberg) in October 1994.
- Wolseley TLC replaced Wolseley Municipality and Wolseley Management Committee in November 1994.
- Ceres TLC replaced Ceres Municipality, Ceres Management Committee and Nduli Town Council in December 1994.
- Prince Alfred Hamlet TLC replaced Prince Alfred Hamlet Municipality in January 1995.

The transitional councils were initially made up of members nominated by the various parties to the negotiations, until May 1996 when elections were held. At these elections the Breërivier District Council was established, replacing the Breërivier Regional Services Council. Transitional representative councils (TRCs) were also elected to represent rural areas outside the TLCs on the District Council; the area that was to become Witzenberg Municipality included most of the Witzenberg TRC and a small part of the Matroosberg TRC.

At the local elections of December 2000 the TLCs and TRCs were dissolved and the Witzenberg Municipality was established as a single local authority. Originally it only covered the western part of its current area, while the sparsely populated Ceres-Karoo area to the east was a District Management Area. This area was incorporated into Witzenberg Municipality when District Management Areas were abolished in 2011.

== Politics ==
The municipal council consists of twenty-three members elected by mixed-member proportional representation. Twelve councillors are elected by first-past-the-post voting in twelve wards, while the remaining eleven are chosen from party lists so that the total number of party representatives is proportional to the number of votes received.

In the election of 4 November 2026 no party obtained a majority of seats.

The following table shows the results of the 2026 election.

Party	Ward			List			Total seats
Party	Votes	%	Seats	Votes	%	Seats	Total seats
Democratic Alliance	10,115	40.58	8	10,219	41.00	2	10
African National Congress	5,800	23.27	4	5,896	23.65	2	6
Patriotic Alliance	2,925	11.73	0	2,797	11.22	3	3
Freedom Front Plus	1,277	5.12	0	1,267	5.08	1	1
Economic Freedom Fighters	719	2.88	0	721	2.89	1	1
Democratic Association of Witzenberg Independence	635	2.55	0	686	2.75	1	1
Witzenberg Party	636	2.55	0	603	2.42	1	1
Independent candidates	13	0.05	0				0
17 other parties	2,807	11.26	0	2,738	10.98	0	0
Total	24,927	100.00	12	24,927	100.00	11	23
Valid votes	24,927	98.62		24,927	98.65		
Invalid/blank votes	348	1.38		341	1.35		
Total votes	25,275	100.00		25,268	100.00		
Registered voters/turnout	53,234	47.48		53,234	47.47		

=== Municipal audits ===
In June 2022, the municipality received an unqualified clean audit for the 2020-21 financial year, one of 41 of the country's 257 municipalities to do so. It has received a clean audit each year since 2016–17.

=== Partners ===
Since 2002 Witzenberg has an official town twinning agreement with the town Essen in Belgium. The city-to-city cooperation consists of sustainable development programs in the vulnerable areas concerning youth, local economic development and environment.
