= Aneplasa balnearia =

Scientific classification
- Kingdom: Animalia
- Phylum: Arthropoda
- Subphylum: Chelicerata
- Class: Arachnida
- Order: Araneae
- Infraorder: Araneomorphae
- Family: Gnaphosidae
- Genus: Aneplasa
- Species: A. balnearia

Binomial name
- Aneplasa balnearia Tucker, 1923

Species of spider

Aneplasa balnearia is a species of spider in the family Gnaphosidae. It is endemic to the Western Cape of South Africa. The species is the type species of the genus Aneplasa.

== Distribution ==
Aneplasa balnearia is endemic to the Western Cape province of South Africa. It has been recorded from several localities including Anysberg Nature Reserve, Ashton, Hex River Valley, and Montagu Baths.

== Habitat and ecology ==
The species is a free-living ground dwelling spider known from the Fynbos biome at altitudes ranging from 167 to 613 m above sea level.

== Description ==
The carapace is medium brown and dark-edged, with a narrower band of prone white hairs down each side. The legs are similar in colour to the carapace and slightly infuscate, also clothed with appressed whitish hairs. The dorsal surface of the abdomen has a median testaceous band down the entire length, broader anteriorly and narrower and serrated or plumed posteriorly, with outer edges dark and lateral border of abdomen dark.

== Conservation ==
Aneplasa balnearia is listed as Data Deficient for taxonomic reasons. The species is protected in the Anysberg Nature Reserve. More sampling is needed to collect males and more accurately determine the species' range.

== Etymology ==
The species name balnearia is derived from Latin "relating to baths".

== Taxonomy ==
The species was originally described by R.W.E. Tucker in 1923 from Montagu in the Western Cape. It has not been revised since the original description and is known only from females.
