= Drakenstein Local Municipality =

Drakenstein
- Local municipality
- Location in the Western Cape
- Coordinates: 33°30′S 19°00′E
- Country: South Africa
- Province: Western Cape
- District: Cape Winelands
- Seat: Paarl
- Wards: 33

Government
  - Type: Municipal council
  - Mayor: Stephen Korabie (DA)
  - Legislature: Drakenstein Municipal Council

Area
  - Total: 1,538 km^{2} (594 sq mi)

Population (2022)
  - Total: 276,800
  - Density: 180.0/km^{2} (466.1/sq mi)

Racial makeup (2022)
  - Black African: 26.0%
  - Coloured: 55.3%
  - Indian/Asian: 0.4%
  - White: 16.8%

First languages (2011)
  - Afrikaans: 75.0%
  - Xhosa: 16.7%
  - English: 5.1%
  - Other: 3.2%
- Time zone: UTC+2 (SAST)
- Municipal code: WC023

Drakenstein Municipality (Afrikaans: Drakenstein Munisipaliteit; Xhosa: uMasipala wase Drakenstein) is a local municipality located within the Cape Winelands District Municipality, in the Western Cape province of South Africa. As of 2011, it had a population of 251,262. Its municipality code is WC023.

== Geography ==
The municipality covers a total area of 1,538 square kilometres (594 sq mi) in the valley of the Berg River to the west of the Boland mountain ranges. It stretches about 75 kilometres (47 mi) from Saron in the north to beyond Paarl in the south. It abuts the Witzenberg Municipality and Breede Valley Municipality to the east, the Stellenbosch Municipality to the south, the City of Cape Town and the Swartland Municipality to the west, and the Bergrivier Municipality to the north.

== Demographics ==
The 2022 census reported that the municipality had a population of 276,800 people, an average annual increase of 0.94% from 2011. "Coloureds" were the largest population group, at 55.3%, followed by "Black Africans" at 26%, and "Whites" at 16.8%.

According to the 2011 census the municipality had a population of 251,262 people in 59,774 households. Of this population, 62.5% describe themselves as "Coloured", 22.7% as "Black African", and 13.5% as "White". The first language of 75.0% of the population is Afrikaans, while 16.7% speak Xhosa and 5.1% speak English.

The principal town and location of the municipal headquarters is Paarl, situated in the south of the municipality, which as of 2011 has a population of 112,045 people. Paarl is the southernmost part of a continuous built-up area along the Berg River which also includes Mbekweni (pop. 30,875) and Wellington (pop. 55,543). In the northern part of the municipality are the smaller towns of Gouda (pop. 3,441) and Saron (pop. 7,843).

== History ==
At the end of the apartheid era, in the area that is today the Drakenstein Municipality, the towns of Paarl, Wellington, and Gouda were governed by municipal councils elected by their white residents. The coloured residents of Paarl and Wellington were governed by management committees subordinate to the white councils, while the former mission station of Saron was governed by a management board. Mbekweni was governed by a town council established under the Black Local Authorities Act, 1982. The northern area around Gouda and Saron, as well as an area around Du Toit's Kloof Pass, formed part of the Breërivier Regional Services Council (RSC); the rest formed part of the Western Cape RSC.

After the national elections of 1994 a process of local government transformation began, in which negotiations were held between the existing local authorities, political parties, and local community organisations. As a result of these negotiations, the existing local authorities were dissolved and transitional local councils (TLCs) were created for each town and village. In October 1994 the Gouda Municipality was merged with Tulbagh (in what is now Witzenberg Municipality) under the Tulbagh TLC. In January 1995 the Paarl Municipality, Paarl Management Committee and Mbekweni Town Council were replaced by the Paarl TLC; and the Wellington Municipality and Wellington Management Committee were replaced by the Wellington TLC. In February 1995 the Saron Management Board was replaced by the Saron TLC. In the same month, the Western Cape RSC was reconstituted as the Winelands RSC after the Cape Town metropolitan area was removed from the jurisdiction of the RSC.

The transitional councils were initially made up of members nominated by the various parties to the negotiations, until May 1996 when elections were held. At these elections the Breërivier and Winelands District Councils (DCs) were established, replacing the corresponding Regional Services Councils. Transitional representative councils (TRCs) were also elected to represent rural areas outside the TLCs on the DCs; the area that was to become Drakenstein Municipality included much of the Paarl TRC (belonging to Winelands DC) and parts of the Witzenberg and Matroosberg TRCs (belonging to Breërivier DC).

At the local elections of December 2000 the TLCs and TRCs were dissolved and the Drakenstein Municipality was established as a single local authority. At the same election the two District Councils were also dissolved and replaced by the Boland District Municipality.

Since its establishment in 2000, the following parties or coalitions have governed the council:

Governing party	Years	Mayor
New National Party/Democratic Alliance	2000–2003	Christian Johannes George Leander (NNP)
New National Party/African National Congress	2003–2006	Herman Bailey (NNP)
African National Congress	2006–2007	Charmaine Manuel (ANC)
Democratic Alliance/Independent Democrats	2007–2007	Koos Louw (DA)
African National Congress	2007–2011	Charmaine Manuel (ANC)
Democratic Alliance	2011–2016	Gesie van Deventer (DA)
Democratic Alliance	2016–2024	Conrad Poole (DA)
Democratic Alliance	2024–present	Stephen Korabie (DA)

From 2000 to 2006, the mayor of the municipality was Christian Johannes George Leander of the NNP. It was divided into twenty-nine wards, with a total of fifty-eight councillors.

After the local government elections of 2006, a coalition was formed by the African National Congress (ANC) and the Independent Democrats (ID), and Charmaine Manuel of the ANC was elected as Mayor with Wilhelm Nothnagel of the ID as Deputy Mayor. The municipality was divided into thirty-one wards, with a total of sixty-one councillors.

In April 2007, the ID broke the coalition, and formed a new coalition with the Democratic Alliance (DA); Koos Louw of the DA was elected Mayor while Nothnagel remained Deputy Mayor.

During the floor crossing period in September 2007, seven councillors (six from the ID, including Nothnagel, and an independent councillor) defected to the ANC, giving the ANC an outright majority (32 of 61 seats) on the council. Charmaine Manuel returned as Mayor, with Nothnagel continuing as deputy.

In the 2011 local government elections the DA managed to turn the tables, and obtained an outright majority on the council, holding 35 seats out of 61. Gesie van Deventer was elected Mayor with Conrad Poole as Deputy Mayor.

In May 2016, Mayor Van Deventer resigned and Deputy Mayor Poole took office as Mayor. Gert Combrink was elected Deputy Mayor.

In the election of 3 August 2016 the Democratic Alliance (DA) obtained a majority of forty-three seats on the council. Conrad Poole was re-elected as Mayor, while Combrink was also re-elected.

== Politics ==
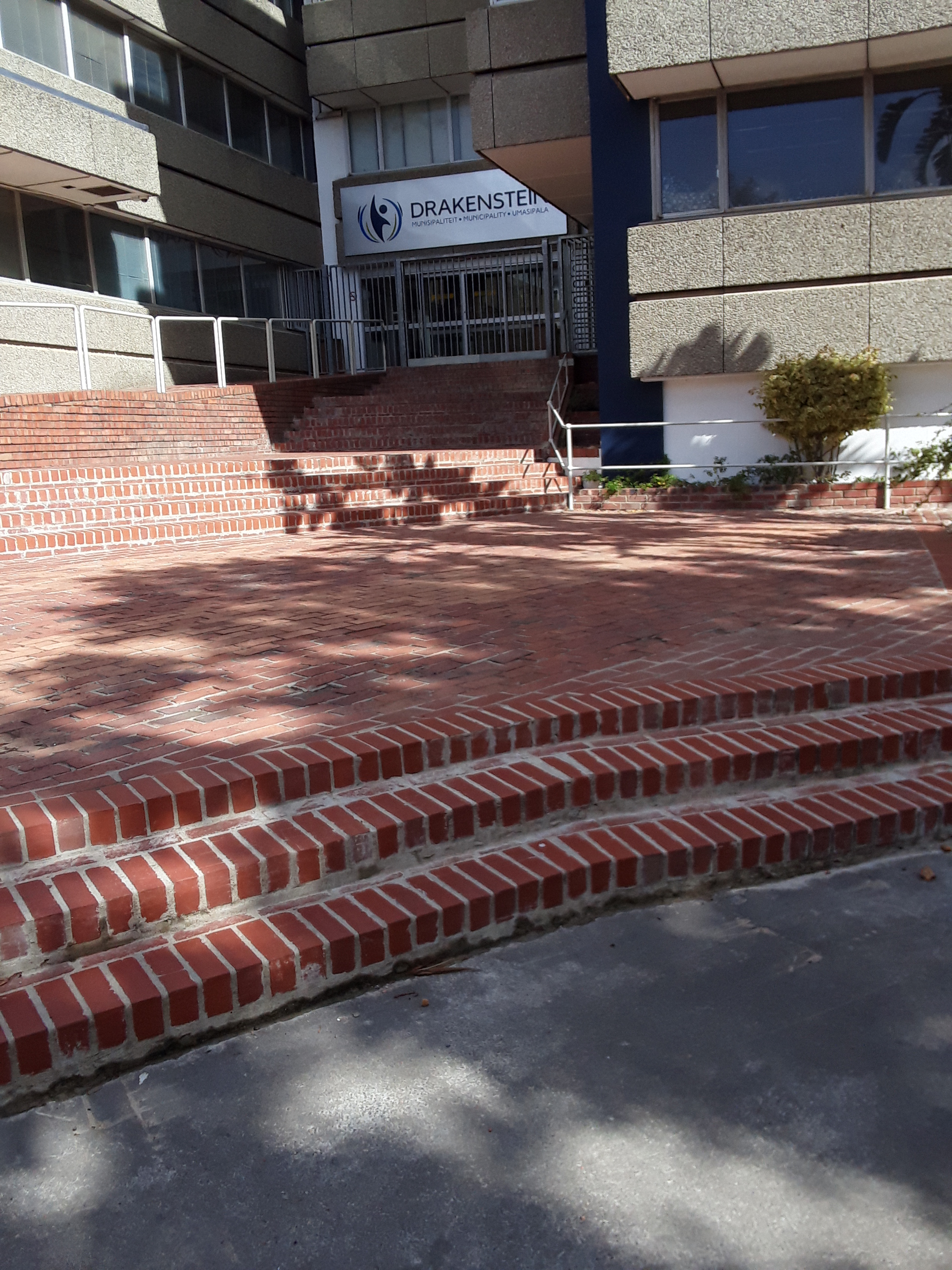
Drakenstein Civic Centre in Paarl, seat of the council

The municipal council consists of sixty-five members elected by mixed-member proportional representation. Thirty-three councillors are elected by first-past-the-post voting in thirty-three wards, while the remaining thirty-two are chosen from party lists so that the total number of party representatives is proportional to the number of votes received. In the election of 4 November 2026 the Democratic Alliance (DA) obtained a majority of thirty-six seats on the council.

Party	Ward			List			Total seats
Party	Votes	%	Seats	Votes	%	Seats	Total seats
Democratic Alliance	46,052	55.38	26	46,780	56.87	10	36
African National Congress	10,968	13.19	6	11,053	13.44	3	9
Patriotic Alliance	10,584	12.73	0	10,738	13.05	8	8
Freedom Front Plus	4,658	5.60	0	4,368	5.31	4	4
Economic Freedom Fighters	1,742	2.09	0	1,704	2.07	1	1
People's Movement for Change	1,646	1.98	0	1,596	1.94	1	1
Pan Africanist Congress of Azania	1,493	1.80	0	1,546	1.88	1	1
Independent candidates	1,629	1.96	1				1
African Christian Democratic Party	742	0.89	0	739	0.90	1	1
Good	682	0.82	0	622	0.76	1	1
South African Communist Party	650	0.78	0	546	0.66	1	1
Al Jama-ah	472	0.57	0	442	0.54	1	1
13 other parties	1,841	2.21	0	2,126	2.58	0	0
Total	83,159	100.00	33	82,260	100.00	32	65
Valid votes	83,159	98.87		82,260	98.73		
Invalid/blank votes	954	1.13		1,055	1.27		
Total votes	84,113	100.00		83,315	100.00		
Registered voters/turnout	146,417	57.45		146,417	56.90		

== See also ==
- Drakenstein
- Drakenstein Lion Park
- Local municipality (South Africa)
- Municipalities of South Africa
- Southern Africa
