= Aneplasa nigra =

Dark Aneplasa Flat-Bellied Ground Spider

Conservation status
- Least Concern (SANBI Red List)

Scientific classification
- Kingdom: Animalia
- Phylum: Arthropoda
- Subphylum: Chelicerata
- Class: Arachnida
- Order: Araneae
- Infraorder: Araneomorphae
- Family: Gnaphosidae
- Genus: Aneplasa
- Species: A. nigra

Binomial name
- Aneplasa nigra Tucker, 1923

Species of spider

Aneplasa nigra is a species of spider in the family Gnaphosidae. It is endemic to South Africa and is commonly known as the dark Aneplasa flat-bellied ground spider.

== Distribution ==
Aneplasa nigra is distributed across two South African provinces: Western Cape and Northern Cape. It has been recorded from the Matroosberg mountains near Ceres, Prieska area, Tswalu Kalahari Reserve, and Benfontein Nature Reserve.

== Habitat and ecology ==
The species is a ground dweller known from Fynbos, Savanna, and Nama Karoo biomes at altitudes ranging from 950 to 1,155 m above sea level. It has also been sampled in pistachio orchards.

== Description ==
The carapace is very dark brown, rimmed and strongly mottled with black. The legs are a little paler becoming paler distally, with tarsi reddish in colour. The abdomen is black, and the sternum is dark infuscated brown. Total length is 4.4 mm.

== Conservation ==
Aneplasa nigra is listed as Least Concern by the South African National Biodiversity Institute. Despite males not being known, samples of females show that this species is widespread. The species is protected in the Tswalu Kalahari Reserve and Benfontein Nature Reserve.

== Taxonomy ==
The species was originally described by R.W.E. Tucker in 1923 from the Matroosberg mountains near Ceres in the Western Cape. It has not been revised since the original description and is known only from females.
