= De Doorns =

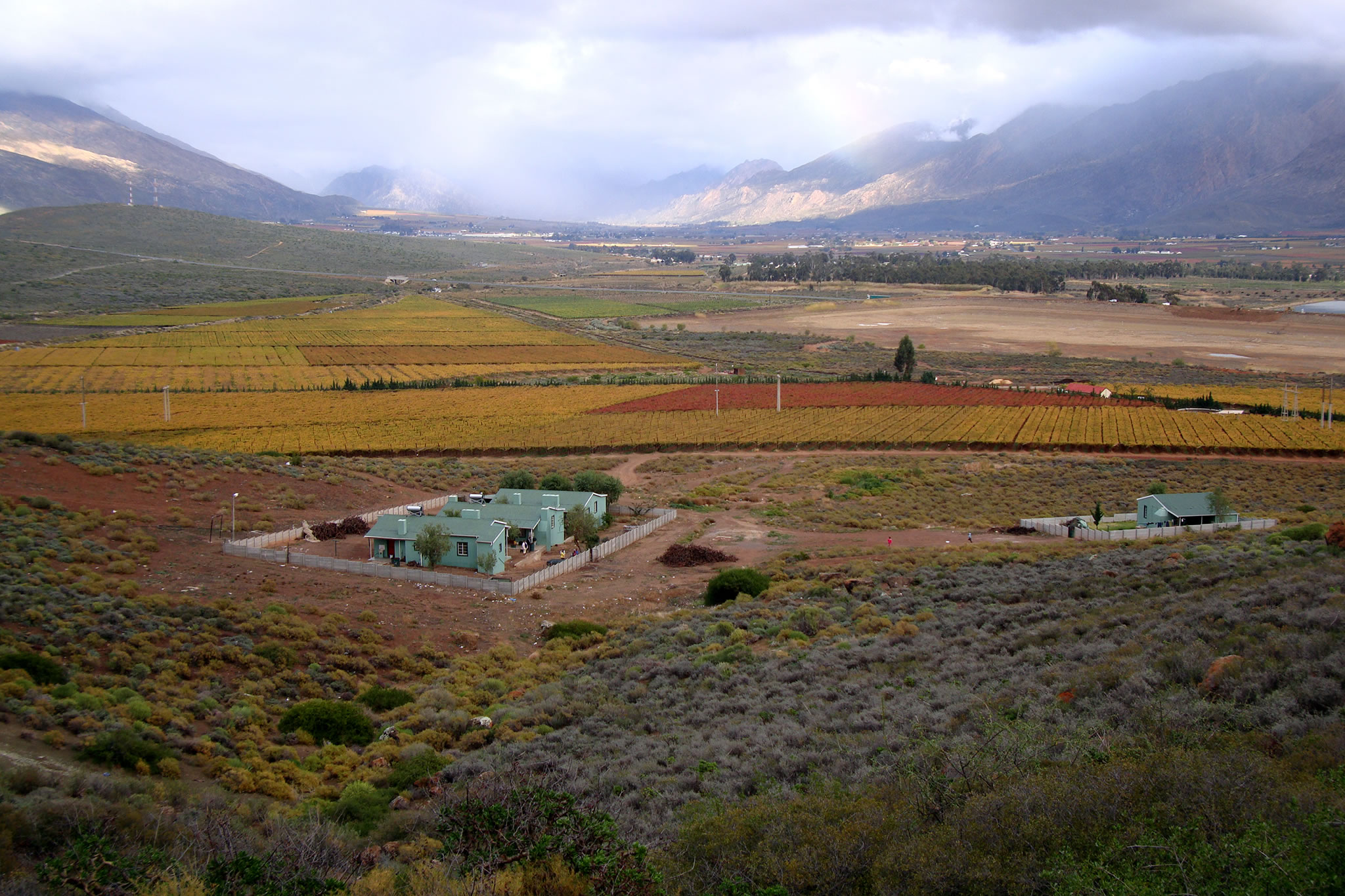
- A view of the Hex River Valley

- Location within Western Cape Location within South Africa
- Coordinates: 33°29′S 19°41′E
- Country: South Africa
- Province: Western Cape
- District: Cape Winelands
- Municipality: Breede Valley

Government
  - Councillor: Daniel Teswin Willemse

Area
  - Total: 7.6 km^{2} (2.9 sq mi)

Population (2011)
  - Total: 11,278
  - Density: 1,500/km^{2} (3,800/sq mi)

Racial makeup (2011)
  - Black African: 40.0%
  - Coloured: 51.5%
  - Indian/Asian: 0.6%
  - White: 6.0%
  - Other: 1.9%

First languages (2011)
  - Afrikaans: 64.0%
  - Xhosa: 25.2%
  - Sotho: 3.7%
  - English: 2.5%
  - Other: 4.5%
- Time zone: UTC+2 (SAST)
- Postal code (street): 6875
- PO box: 6875
- Area code: 023

De Doorns is situated in the Breede Valley Local Municipality, Cape Winelands District Municipality in the Western Cape province of South Africa.

== Location ==
It lies in the Hex River Valley on the N1 national route, 32 km north-east of Worcester and 40 km south-west of Touwsrivier. It is in the centre of an export grape growing region, surrounded by over 200 table grape farms.

== History ==
The town takes its name from the farm "De Doorns boven aan de Hex Rivier" (‘the thorns on the upper Hex River’), known as early as 1725. The area was declared a sub-drosty of Tulbagh in 1819 and the farm became the seat of the area's own drostdy in 1822.

The De Doorns farm was bought by the government of Cape Prime Minister John Molteno in 1875, to build a railway station for the rapidly expanding Cape Government Railways. The line was immediately built through De Doorns, connecting it to Cape Town on the coast and reaching Montagu Road (later Touws River) in 1877, on its way to Kimberley. Around the station, the hamlet of De Doorns would later develop.

The area around the town became an important region for table grape farming. It had the necessary infrastructure for exporting its produce, and the longest harvest season in the world - December to April. During the second Anglo-Boer War (1899-1902), the town and its railway infrastructure played an important supporting role. The stone blockhouses which were built to protect the vital railway link are still found in the valley.

A village management board was instituted for De Doorns in 1933 and municipal status attained in 1951.
