= Raithby, South Africa =

Coordinates: 34.022°S 18.805°E

Raithby is a village in the Stellenbosch Local Municipality. As of the 2011 census, the village had a population of 908. It lies on the western side of the R44, just off the Winery Road that leaves the R44 to connect Stellenbosch with Firgrove. Amenities in Raithby include a Methodist church and a church-owned primary school.
