= Hex River (Breede River) =

River in the Western Cape, South Africa

Hex River Hexrivier
- Location of the Hex River's mouth

Location
- Country: South Africa
- Region: Western Cape

Physical characteristics
- Source: Hex Pass
  - location: Bonteberg Mountains
  - coordinates: 33°24′5″S 19°44′58″E
  - elevation: 1,000 m (3,300 ft)
- Mouth: Breede River
  - location: near Worcester
  - coordinates: 33°41′45″S 19°27′13″E
  - elevation: 201 m (659 ft)

The Hex River is a tributary of the Breede River located in the Western Cape of South Africa. The most important settlements along the river are the small towns of De Doorns and Touws River.

== Description ==
The headwaters of the Hex River are located on the southern slopes of the Bonteberg Mountains at about 1000 m altitude at the Hex Pass, which leads over to the Great Karoo. In this region, its watercourse is created by the confluence of several small mountain streams. The mountains here can be covered in snow in winter. Its broad valley is largely accompanied by mountain ranges. The Hex River flows into the Breede River not far from the city of Worcester north of Brandvlei Dam.

Along with a few other valleys, the valley is one of the most water-rich regions in the Western Cape. These conditions are based on the numerous permanent mountain streams in the precipitation-rich Hex River Mountains and Kwadouws Mountains. The delayed settlement by European immigrants despite favorable conditions for agriculture is due to the unfavorable geographical location.

The Hex River Valley has 5,200 acres of irrigated agricultural land, about 86 percent of which is used for growing lemons. In addition, around 450 boreholes are used to extract groundwater, with an average flow rate of 5 liters per second.

Important tributaries of the Hex River are the Amandels River and the Sanddrift River.

== Culture and settlement history of the valley ==
The earliest European settlements have been here since the 18th century. By 1700, Boer treks had already passed the valley in the direction of the Great Karoo. The valley was difficult from Cape Town and only accessible via detours. This required a further arc to the north, which led through the Tulbagh Basin and the Nuwekloof (Kl. Berg River), and from 1835 also over the Bainskloof Pass. In 1944, after construction work, the road from Worcester to Paarl and Cape Town could be driven over the Du Toitskloof Pass.

The construction of the railway line to Kimberley provided the impetus for irrigation farming in the Hex River Valley. An extensive fruit-growing agriculture established itself here at an early stage, which later became known beyond its region. The further construction of traffic routes, especially roads, promoted the development of agriculture to a considerable extent.

== Environmental issues ==
The extensive removal of bank vegetation and the modification of the natural course of the river and the canal courses through sandstone rubble mining have impaired the integrity of the lower Hex and Smalblaar river systems.

Orchards and vineyards extend to the banks of the Dwars, Hex and Upper Breede rivers. Their construction has led to the penetration of foreign invasive vegetation and to erosion phenomena in the area of the river banks. To improve the situation, the restoration of retention areas, a sharp reduction in bulldozer activities to remodel the land surface are recommended, and improved land use management would be required in the entire catchment area of the Hex River.

== Water reservoirs in the catchment area ==
The Hex River, like its water-rich tributary, the Amandels River, does not have its own reservoirs for water extraction. In the upper reaches of the Sanddrift River (Sanddriftskloof) there are two dams, the Lakenvallei Dam (10.230 million cubic meters) near Ceres and the Roode Elsberg Dam (7.733 million cubic meters). Their storage capacity leads to very low water levels in the summer until the lower reaches dry up.

== See also ==
- List of rivers of South Africa
