= 1995–96 South African municipal elections =

- 1 November 1995; 29 May 1996 (WC); 26 June 1996 (KZN)

All seats to the municipalities of South Africa
- Turnout: 49%
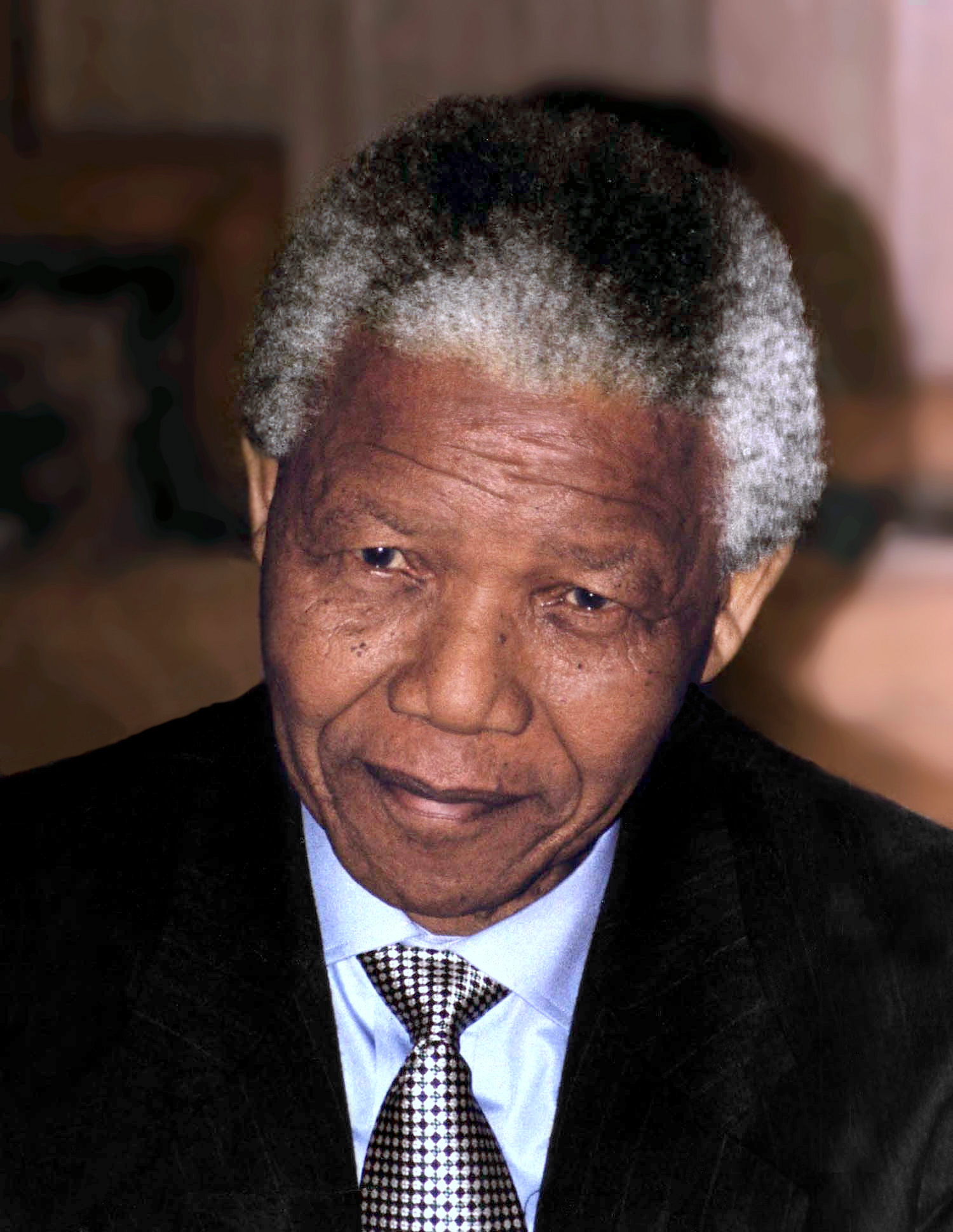

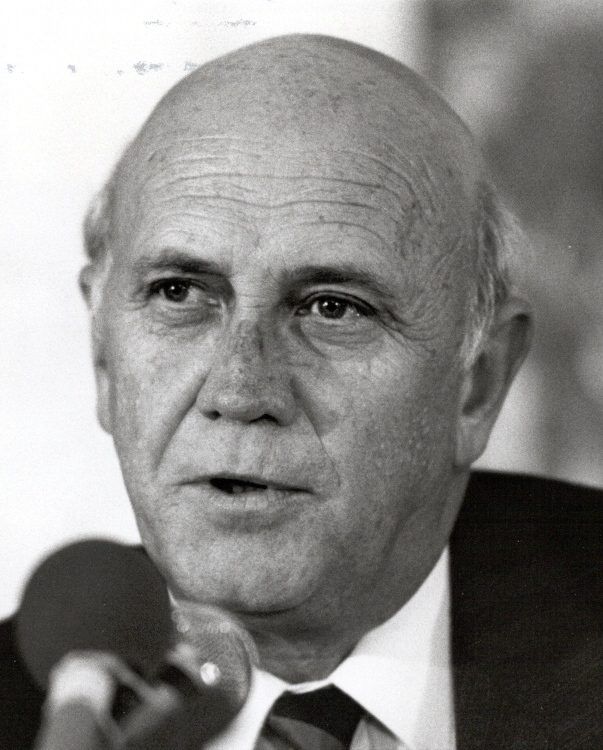

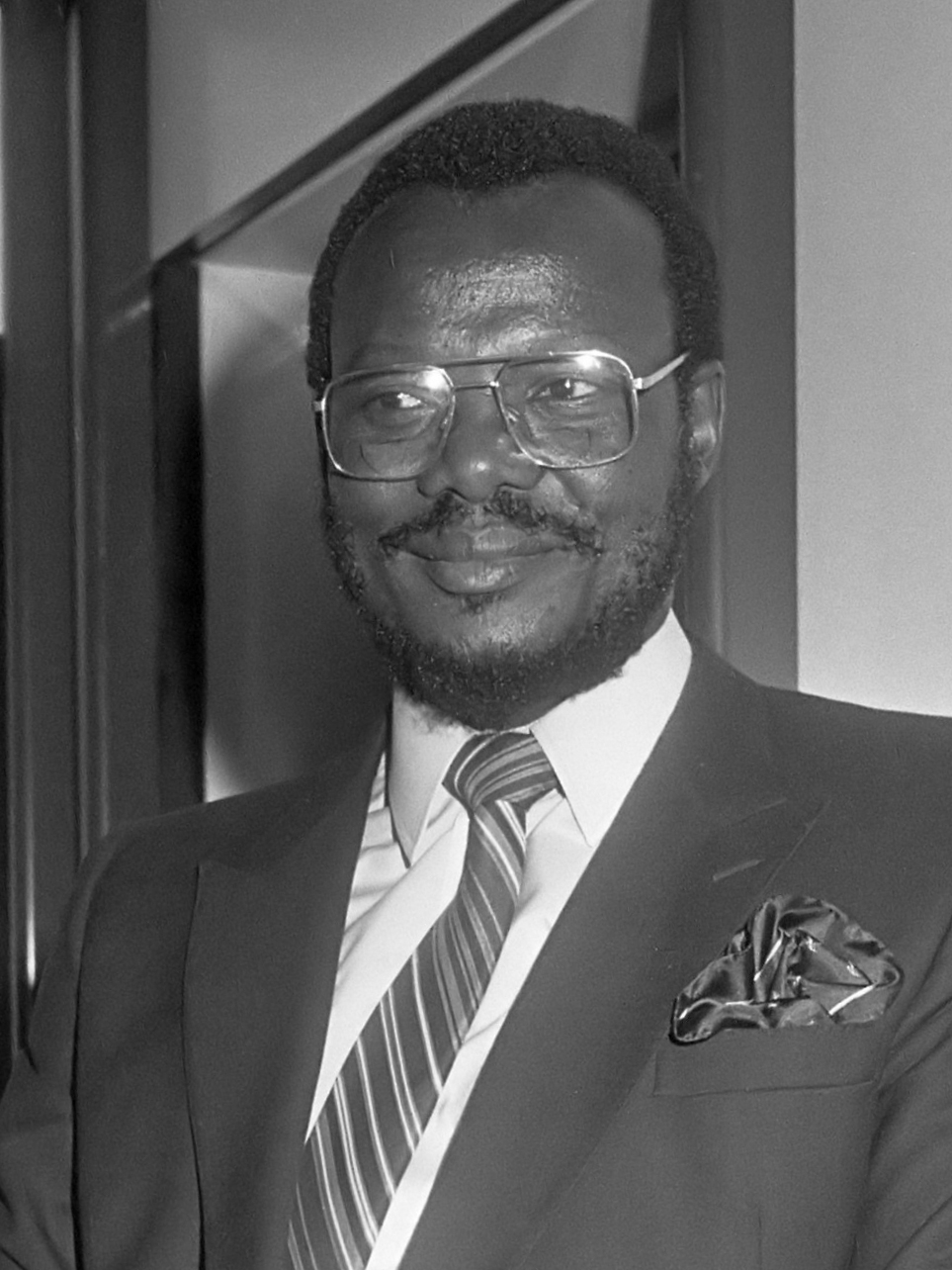

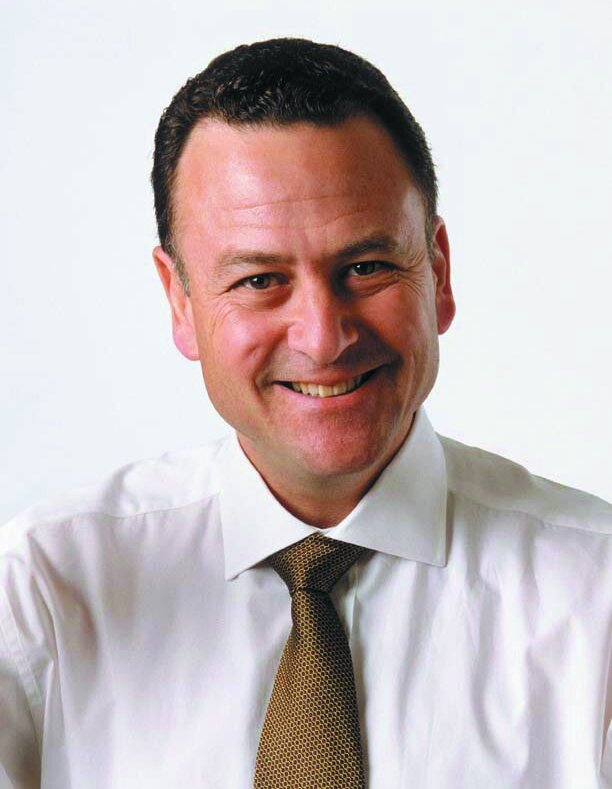

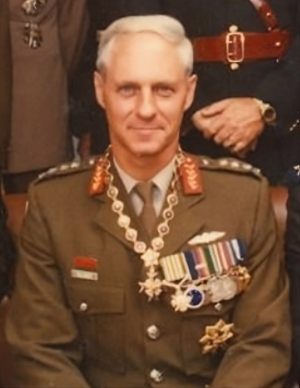
	First party	Second party	Third party
Leader	Nelson Mandela	F.W. de Klerk	Mangosuthu Buthelezi
Party	ANC	National	IFP
Popular vote	58.02%	18.02%	8.73%
Councillors	6,032	1,814	754
	Fourth party	Fifth party
Leader	Tony Leon	Constand Viljoen
Party	Democratic	Freedom Front
Popular vote	3.48%	2.66%
Councillors	138	159

Municipal elections were held in South Africa in 1995 and 1996. Over 11 000 seats were contested of which the African National Congress won 6 032, the National Party 1 814, the Inkhata Freedom Party 754 and the Democratic Party 138.

The elections were held on 1 November 1995 in most of the country, but delayed to 29 May 1996 in the Western Cape and 26 June 1996 in KwaZulu-Natal due to boundary demarcation disputes.

Party	Leader	Votes	%	Seats
African National Congress	Nelson Mandela	5,033,855	58.02%	6 032
National Party	Frederik de Klerk	1,563,465	18.02%	1 814
Inkatha Freedom Party	Mangosuthu Buthelezi	757,704	8.73%	754
Democratic Party	Tony Leon	302,006	3.48%	138
Freedom Front	Constand Viljoen	230,845	2.66%	159
Pan Africanist Congress	Motsoko Pheko	104,455	1.2%	27
Conservative Party	Ferdinand Hartzenberg	68,595	0.79%	57
African Christian Democratic Party	Kenneth Meshoe	66,985	0.77%	8
Others		422 587	4.27%	1097
Total		8 619 065	100.00%	11 368
