= Cape Winelands District Municipality =

Cape Winelands Kaapse Wynland Brede River District
- District municipality
- Seal

- Location in South Africa

- Local municipalities within the Cape Winelands
- Coordinates: 33°20′S 19°40′E
- Country: South Africa
- Province: Western Cape
- Seat: Worcester
- Local municipalities: List: Witzenberg; Drakenstein; Stellenbosch; Breede Valley; Langeberg

Government
  - Type: Municipal council
  - Mayor: Helena von Schlicht (DA)

Area
  - Total: 21,473 km^{2} (8,291 sq mi)

Population (2011)
  - Total: 787,490
  - Density: 36.673/km^{2} (94.984/sq mi)

Racial makeup (2011)
  - Black African: 23.7%
  - Coloured: 62.1%
  - Indian/Asian: 0.4%
  - White: 12.9%

First languages (2011)
  - Afrikaans: 74.8%
  - Xhosa: 16.6%
  - English: 4.3%
  - Sotho: 1.9%
  - Other: 2.4%
- Time zone: UTC+2 (SAST)
- Municipal code: DC2

The Cape Winelands District Municipality (Afrikaans: Kaapse Wynland-distriksmunisipaliteit; Xhosa: uMasipala weSithili sase Cape Winelands), formerly the Boland District Municipality, is a district municipality located in the Boland region of the Western Cape province of South Africa. As of 2011, it had a population of 787,490. The largest towns in the municipality are Paarl, Worcester, Stellenbosch and Wellington.

== Geography ==
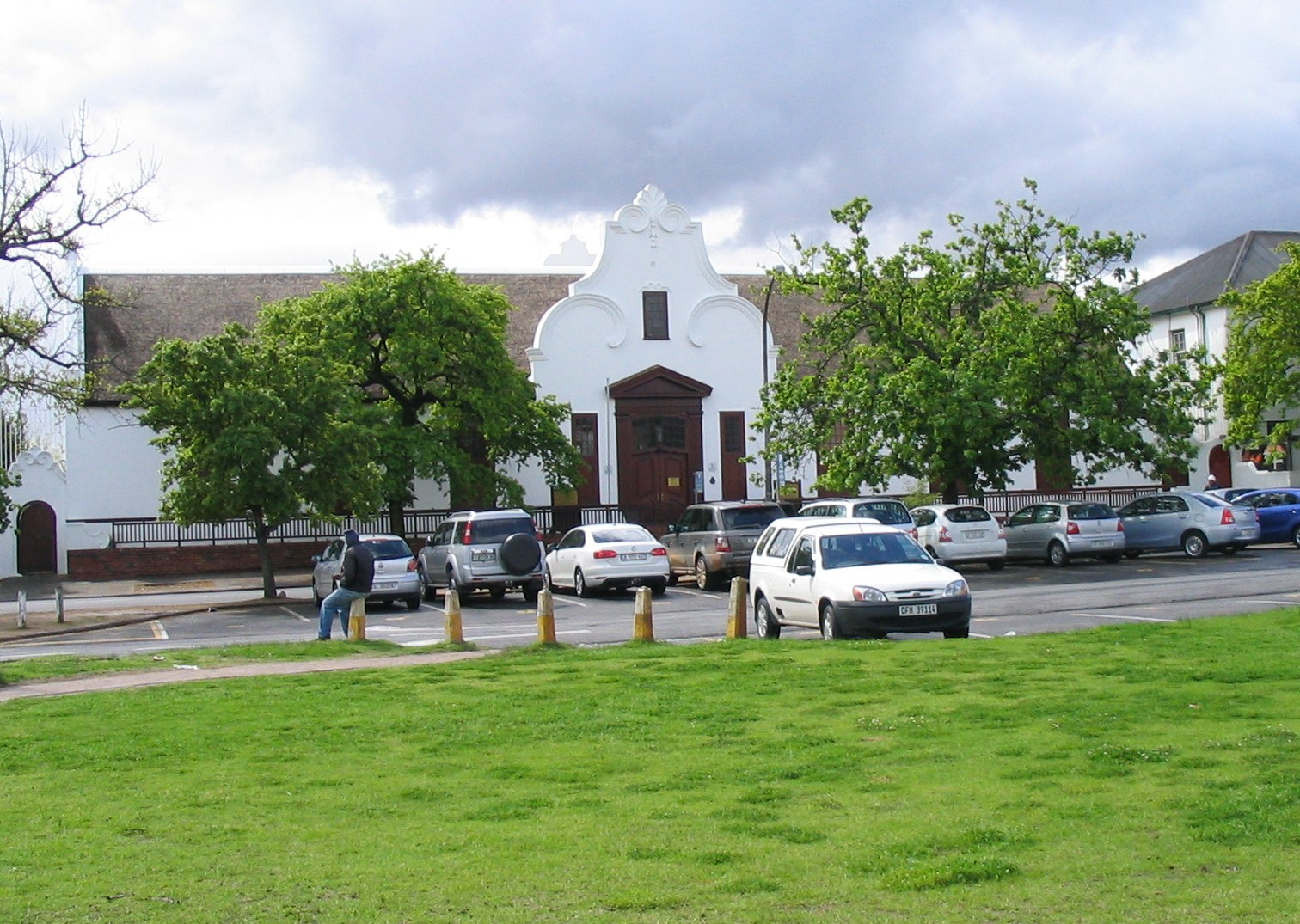
Stellenbosch office of the Cape Winelands District Municipality

The boundaries of this municipality, which covers an area of 22,289 square kilometres (8,606 sq mi), coincide roughly with the boundaries of the geographical area that has been known since the early days of the Cape Colony as "The Boland". In Afrikaans Boland means "up land" or "the higher land" or "the land above" (i.e. in contrast to the low coastal areas of the original Dutch settlement at the Cape). However, the term "Boland", as originally used, was a loose concept, with no defined borders (cf. the informal but not meaningless terms "The Sahara" or "The Rocky Mountains"). The Boland is generally mountainous, with range after range of beautiful and isolated sandstone peaks reaching towards 2000m but also has broad, fertile valleys that are home to some of the country's finest vineyards.

The region has a Mediterranean climate, with hot, dry summers are hot and cool, damp winters, with snow on the peaks during August and September. The diverse geography includes peaks, ranges, escarpments, valleys, cliffs, rivers, pools, waterfalls, screes, canyons, springs, forests, caves and other natural features.

The Cape Winelands District Municipality is divided into five local municipalities:

Name	Seat	Population (2011)	Area (km^{2})	Density (inhabitants/km^{2})
Witzenberg	Ceres	115,946	10,753	10.8
Drakenstein	Paarl	251,262	1,538	163.4
Stellenbosch	Stellenbosch	155,733	831	187.4
Breede Valley	Worcester	166,825	3,833	43.5
Langeberg	Ashton	97,724	4,518	21.6
Total		787,490	21,473	36.7

=== Adjacent municipalities ===
- Namakwa District Municipality, Northern Cape (north)
- Central Karoo District Municipality (east)
- Garden Route District Municipality (east)
- Overberg District Municipality (south)
- City of Cape Town (southwest)
- West Coast District Municipality (west)

== History ==
At the end of the apartheid era the area that is today the Cape Winelands District Municipality formed part of two Regional Services Councils (RSCs). The western part—today's Drakenstein and Stellenbosch local municipalities—was joined with the Cape Town metropolitan area in the Western Cape RSC. The eastern part—today's Witzenberg, Breede Valley and Langeberg local municipalities—formed the Breërivier RSC. The towns within the area were governed by various local authorities divided along racial lines.

After the national elections of 1994 a process of local government transformation began, in which negotiations were held between the existing local authorities, political parties, and local community organisations. In late 1994 and early 1995 the racially divided local authorities were replaced by transitional local councils (TLCs) for each town and village. In February 1995 the Western Cape RSC was divided into the Cape Metropolitan Council for the Cape Town metropolitan area and the Winelands RSC for the Drakenstein–Stellenbosch area.

When elections were held in May 1996, the Winelands and Breërivier RSCs were reconstituted as District Councils (DCs). Transitional representative councils (TRCs) were also elected to represent the rural areas—Paarl and Stellenbosch TRCs in the Winelands RSC, and Witzenberg, Matroosberg and Wynland TRCs in the Breërivier RSC.

The local government transformation process was completed with the local elections of December 2000, when the Winelands and Breërivier DCs were replaced by the Boland District Municipality. The TLCs and TRCs were replaced by five local municipalities as well as a large District Management Area (DMA) in the sparsely populated eastern part of the district. In 2004 the name "Boland" was changed to "Cape Winelands". In 2011 DMAs were abolished and the local municipalities extended to cover the whole district.

== Politics ==
The council of the Cape Winelands District Municipality consists of forty-one councillors, of whom seventeen are directly elected by party-list proportional representation. The other twenty-four councillors are appointed by the councils of the constituent local municipalities: eight by Drakenstein, five each by Stellenbosch and Breede Valley, and three each by Witzenberg and Langeberg.

After then elections of 3 August 2016 the Democratic Alliance (DA) obtained a majority of 27 seats on the council. The executive mayor is Dr Helena von Schlicht of the DA, and the deputy mayor is Dirk Swart, also of the DA.

The following table shows the composition of the council after the 2016 election.

Party	Directly elected	Appointed by local councils					Total
Party	Directly elected	Witzenberg	Drakenstein	Stellenbosch	Breede Valley	Langeberg	Total
DA	11	2	5	4	3	2	27
African National Congress	5	1	2	1	1	1	11
Economic Freedom Fighters	1		1				2
Breedevallei Onafhanklik					1		1

The following table shows the results of the election of the seventeen directly elected councillors.

Party	Votes	Vote %	Seats
DA	143,305	61.5	11
African National Congress	61,932	26.6	5
Economic Freedom Fighters	6,633	2.8	1
Breedevallei Onafhanklik	3,654	1.6	0
African Christian Democratic Party	2,657	1.1	0
People's Democratic Movement	2,525	1.1	0
Congress of the People	2,350	1.0	0
Independent Civic Organisation	2,098	0.9	0
VF+	1,989	0.9	0
Witzenberg Aksie	1,295	0.6	0
Democratic New Civic Association	909	0.4	0
Langeberg Independent Party	874	0.4	0
Alliance for Democratic Freedom	799	0.3	0
PA	655	0.3	0
Federation of Democrats	599	0.3	0
Nationalist Coloured Party	316	0.1	0
United Franschhoek Valley	281	0.1	0
Total	232,871		17
Valid votes	232,871	98.5	
Spoilt votes	3,600	1.5	
Total votes cast	236,471		
Registered voters	388,899		
Turnout percentage	60.8		

== Demographics ==
The following statistics are from the 2011 Census. Note that due to fuzzing applied to statistics, columns may not sum to exactly the indicated total.

=== First language ===
Language	Population	%
Afrikaans	568,100	74.8%
Xhosa	126,087	16.6%
English	32,815	4.3%
Sotho	14,309	1.9%
Sign language	3,154	0.4%
Tswana	2,979	0.4%
Zulu	1,331	0.2%
Ndebele	969	0.1%
Northern Sotho	678	0.1%
Tsonga	494	0.1%
Venda	449	0.1%
Swazi	295	0.0%
Other	8,087	1.1%
Total	759,747	
Not applicable	27,744	

=== Race ===
Race	Population	%
Coloured	489,189	62.1%
Black African	186,472	23.7%
White	101,491	12.9%
Indian or Asian	3,153	0.4%
Other	7,184	0.9%
Total	787,490	

=== Gender ===
Gender	Population	%
Female	399,278	50.7%
Male	388,212	49.3%
Total	787,490	

=== Age ===
Age group	Population	%
0–4	74,012	9.4%
5–9	64,252	8.2%
10–14	65,212	8.3%
15–19	72,747	9.2%
20–24	84,092	10.7%
25–29	74,212	9.4%
30–34	58,571	7.4%
35–39	56,719	7.2%
40–44	55,901	7.1%
45–49	48,551	6.2%
50–54	39,824	5.1%
55–59	30,404	3.9%
60–64	22,580	2.9%
65–69	15,097	1.9%
70–74	10,862	1.4%
75–79	7,000	0.9%
80–84	4,161	0.5%
85+	1,958	0.2%
Total	787,490	
