= Ruiterbos =

Ruiterbos Ruiterbosch (Dutch)
- Village
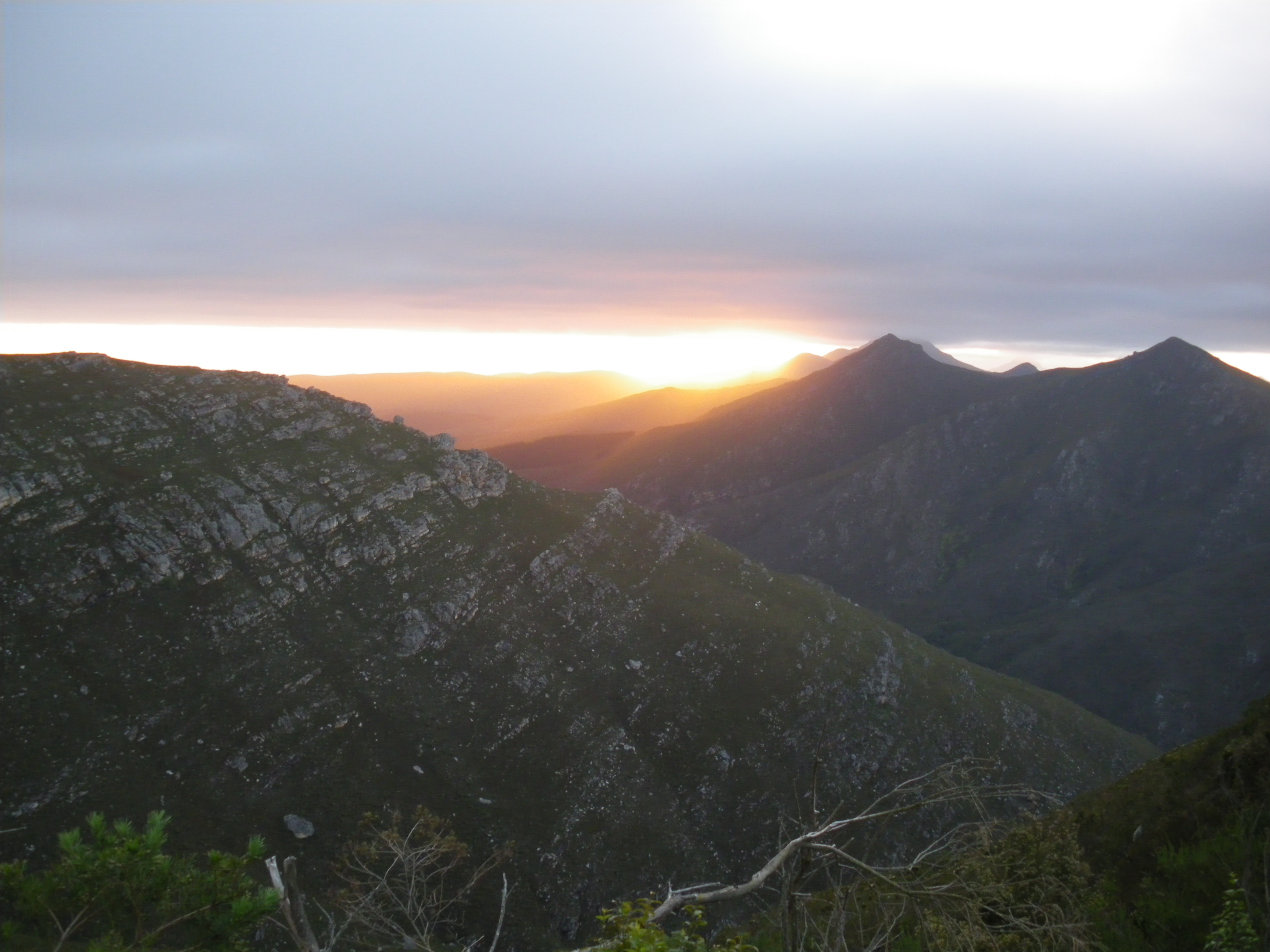
- The Robinson Pass next to the town

- Location within Western Cape Location within South Africa
- Coordinates: 33°56′40″S 22°02′08″E
- Country: South Africa
- Province: Western Cape
- District: Garden Route
- Municipality: Mossel Bay

Population (2011)
  - Total: 937

Racial Makeup (2011)
  - Coloured: 55.9%
  - White: 34.3%
  - Black: 10.5%
  - Other: 0.4%

First Languages (2011)
  - Afrikaans: 87.9%
  - English: 6.0%
  - Sign language: 4.1%
  - Other: 2.0%
- Time zone: UTC+2 (SAST)

Ruiterbos (Dutch: Ruiterbosch) is a village in the Mossel Bay Local Municipality in the Western Cape province of South Africa. As of 2011, the village had a population of 937 living in 310 households. The village is situated at the foot of the Robinson Pass between Mossel Bay and Oudtshoorn. The settlement is about 22 km north of Mossel Bay, 12 km north of Brandwag and 10 km west of Friemersheim. The R328 passes through the town. The village is home to the Drie Magrietjies Padstal. Next to the village is the Ruitersbos Nature Reserve.
