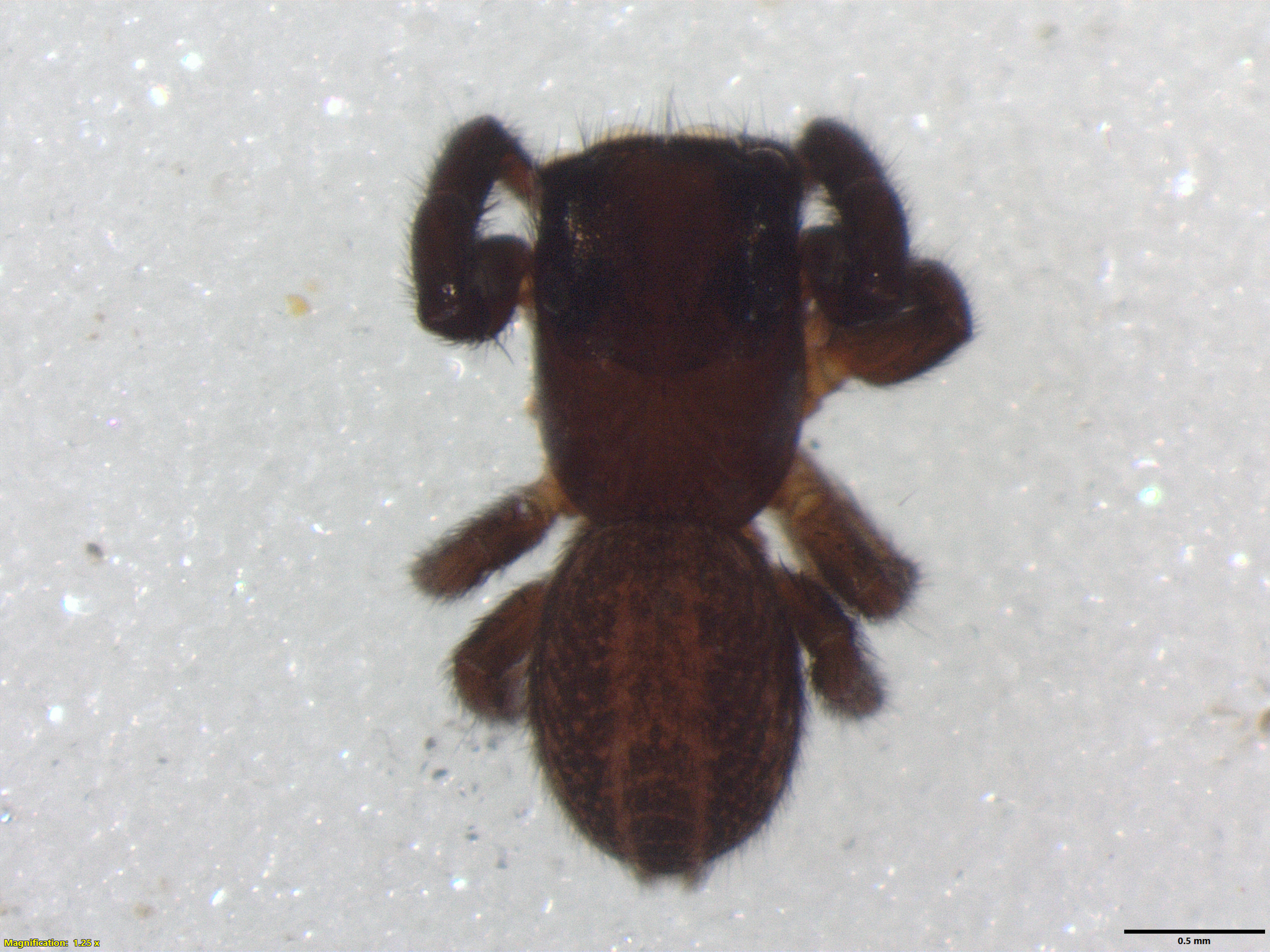
- male

Scientific classification
- Kingdom: Animalia
- Phylum: Arthropoda
- Subphylum: Chelicerata
- Class: Arachnida
- Order: Araneae
- Infraorder: Araneomorphae
- Family: Salticidae
- Genus: Euophrys
- Species: E. recta

Binomial name
- Euophrys recta Wesołowska, Azarkina & Russell-Smith, 2014

= Euophrys recta =

Species of spider

Euophrys recta is a species of jumping spider in the genus Euophrys that is endemic to South Africa. The species was first described in 2014 by Wanda Wesołowska, Galina Azarkina and Anthony Russell-Smith. It is a small spider, with a body that consists of a cephalothorax that is typically 1.4 mm (0.06 in) long and an abdomen that is typically 1.5 mm (0.06 in) long. The carapace, the topside of the cephalothorax, is brown and the sternum, or underside, is black. The abdomen has a pattern of yellow and dark brown stripes on top and is blackish underneath. The copulatory organs are distinctive amongst spiders in the genus, particularly male's long tibial apophysis, or protrusion on the palpal tibia, and small embolic disk, or disk on the palpal bulb at the base of the embolus. The female has not been described.

== Taxonomy ==
Euophrys recta is a species of jumping spider that was first described by Wanda Wesołowska, Galina Azarkina and Anthony Russell-Smith in 2014. They allocated it to the genus Euophrys, which had been first circumscribed by Carl Ludwig Koch in 1934. It was one of over 500 species identified by the Polish arachnologist Wesołowska during her career, more than any other contemporary writer and second only to the French arachnologist Eugène Simon. The genus is named for a Greek word that can be translated "fair eyebrows". The species is named for a Latin word that describes the way that the spider resembles other members of the genus.

In Wayne Maddison's 2015 study of spider phylogenetic classification, the genus Euophrys was listed to the tribe Euophryini. First circumscribed by Simon in 1901, the tribe has also been known as Euophrydinae, but the original name is now more prevalent. It is a member of a subgroup of genera called Evophrydeae after the latter name. It is a member of the clade Saltafresia. Analysis of protein-coding genes showed it was particularly related to Thorelliola. In 2016, Prószyński added the genus to a group of genera named Euopherines, named after the genus. This is a member of the supergroup of genera Euphryoida.

== Description ==
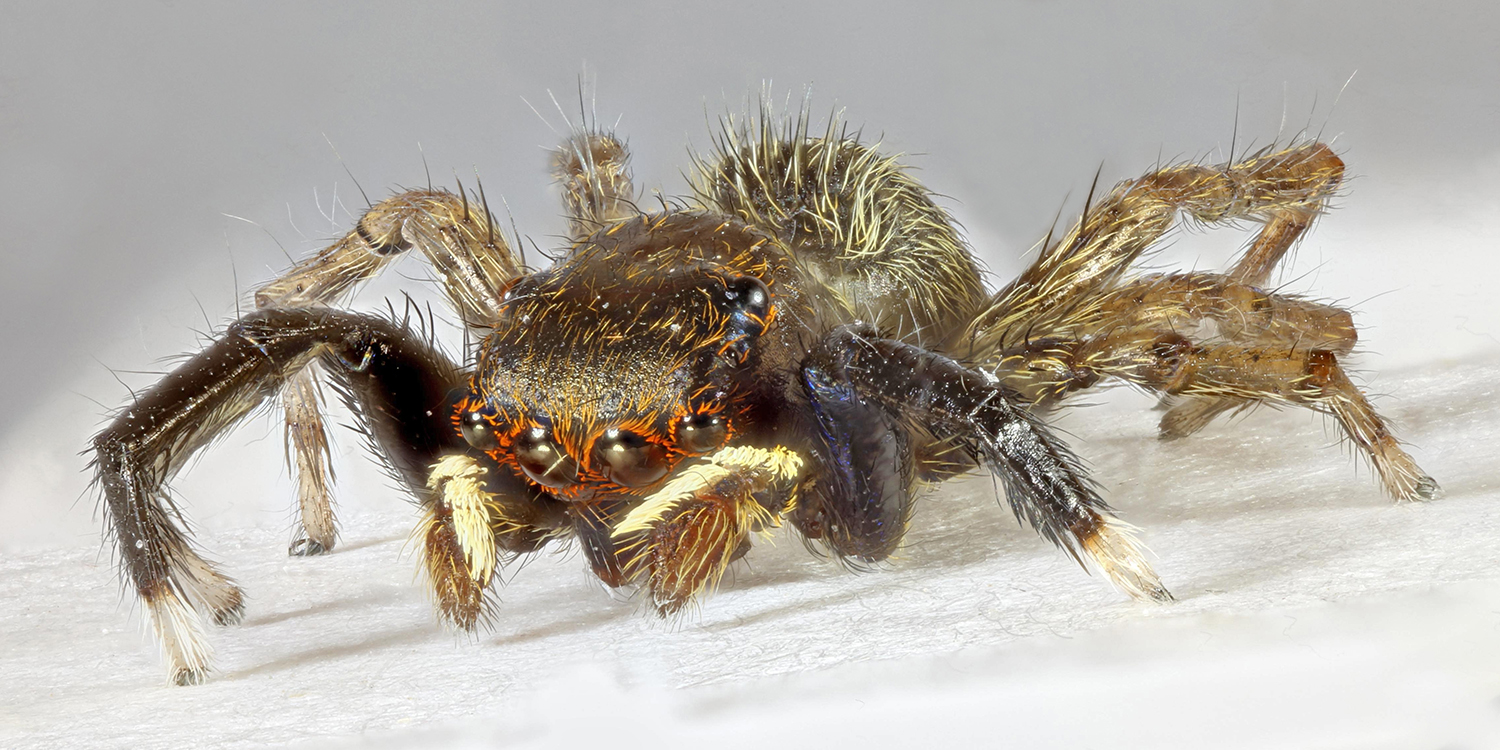
The related Euophrys frontalis

Euophrys recta is a small spider with a body divided into two main parts: a broad cephalothorax and an oval abdomen. The male has a cephalothorax that is typically 1.4 mm (0.06 in) long and 1 mm (0.04 in) wide, while the abdomen is 1.5 mm (0.06 in) long and 1.1 mm (0.04 in) wide. The carapace, the hard upper part of the cephalothorax, is low and dark brown with depression, or fovea in the middle and is covered in translucent hairs. The eye field is black with white hairs near some of the eyes themselves. The underside of the cephalothorax, or sternum, is also black. The spider's face, or clypeus, is low and dark. The mouthparts are dark brown and the chelicerae has two teeth at the front and one behind.

The spider's abdomen is larger than its carapace. The top has a pattern of two orange stripes on a background of mosaic-like patchwork of very small dark brown patches and a covering of thin hairs. The sides are dark with a broken cream line and the underside is blackish. The spider has brownish-yellow spinnerets. Its legs and pedipalps are generally blackish with orange patches, dark hairs and dark spines. The spider has distinctive copulatory organs. Only the male has been described, but this is sufficient to be able to show how the species differs from other Euophrys spiders. The palpal bulb has a bulge to its base and a thin embolus that emanates from its top. The disk that mounts the embolus, or embolic disk, is small. The palpal tibia is also small but has a long wide protrusion, or tibial apophysis. The wider tibial apophysis and small embolic disk are key to distinguishing the spider from related species like Euophrys maseruensis.

== Distribution and habitat ==
Euophrys spiders live across the world, although those found in North America may be accidental migrants and those in Central and South America misidentifications. In Africa, they are mainly found in the southern part of the continent. Euophrys recta is endemic to South Africa. It has been found only in Western Cape, the male holotype being discovered in 2012 in the Grootvadersbosch Nature Reserve near Suurbraak. Other examples have been found near Glentana. The spider thrives in the forests of the afromontane, living in leaf litter.
