= Great Brak River (town) =

Great Brak River Groot-Brakrivier
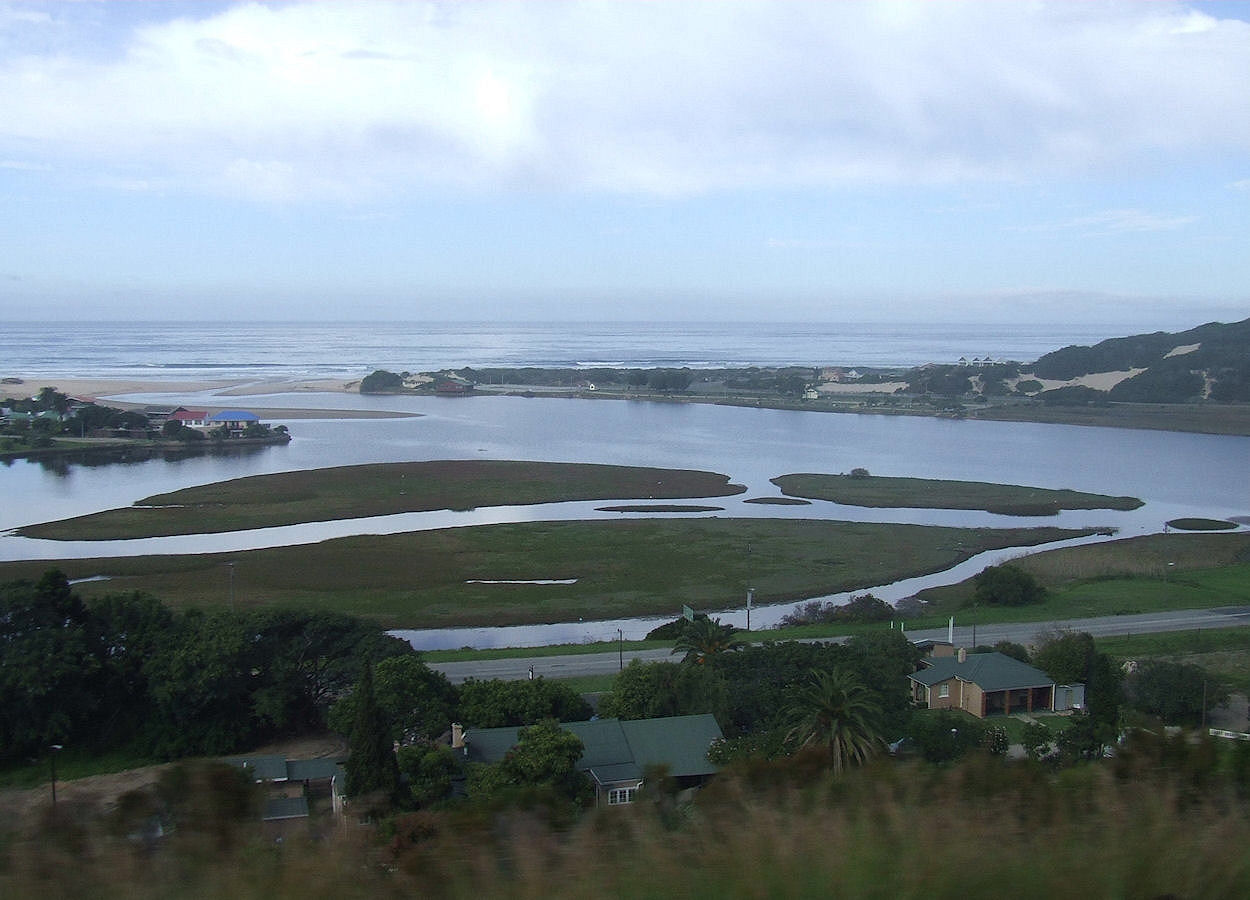

- Location within Western Cape Location within South Africa
- Coordinates: 34°02′33″S 22°13′53″E
- Country: South Africa
- Province: Western Cape
- District: Garden Route
- Municipality: Mossel Bay

Area
  - Total: 22.06 km^{2} (8.52 sq mi)

Population (2011)
  - Total: 10,619
  - Density: 481.4/km^{2} (1,247/sq mi)

Racial makeup (2011)
  - Black African: 5.3%
  - Coloured: 66.8%
  - Indian/Asian: 0.5%
  - White: 24.6%
  - Other: 2.7%

First languages (2011)
  - Afrikaans: 90.8%
  - English: 5.4%
  - Sotho: 1.1%
  - Xhosa: 1.1%
  - Other: 1.7%
- Time zone: UTC+2 (SAST)
- Postal code (street): 6525
- PO box: 6525

Great Brak River (Afrikaans: Groot-Brakrivier) is a coastal village in the Mossel Bay Local Municipality in the Western Cape province of South Africa. It is a historic village built around the lagoon of the Great Brak River, 17 kilometres (11 mi) north-northeast of the town of Mossel Bay.

== History ==
The town was founded by the Searle family of Surrey, England, of which the elder brother, Richard (originally a labourer), emigrated to South Africa under a government-sponsored scheme in 1845. He arrived in Great Brak River to work for the Central Road Board in 1850. Richard's brother, Charles, and sister-in-law, Pamela, are credited with founding the village in 1859. The Searle family went on to become toll keepers (toll houses were operated by private contractors during the 1800s), and would establish shopping, accommodation, shoe-making and timber businesses in the village.

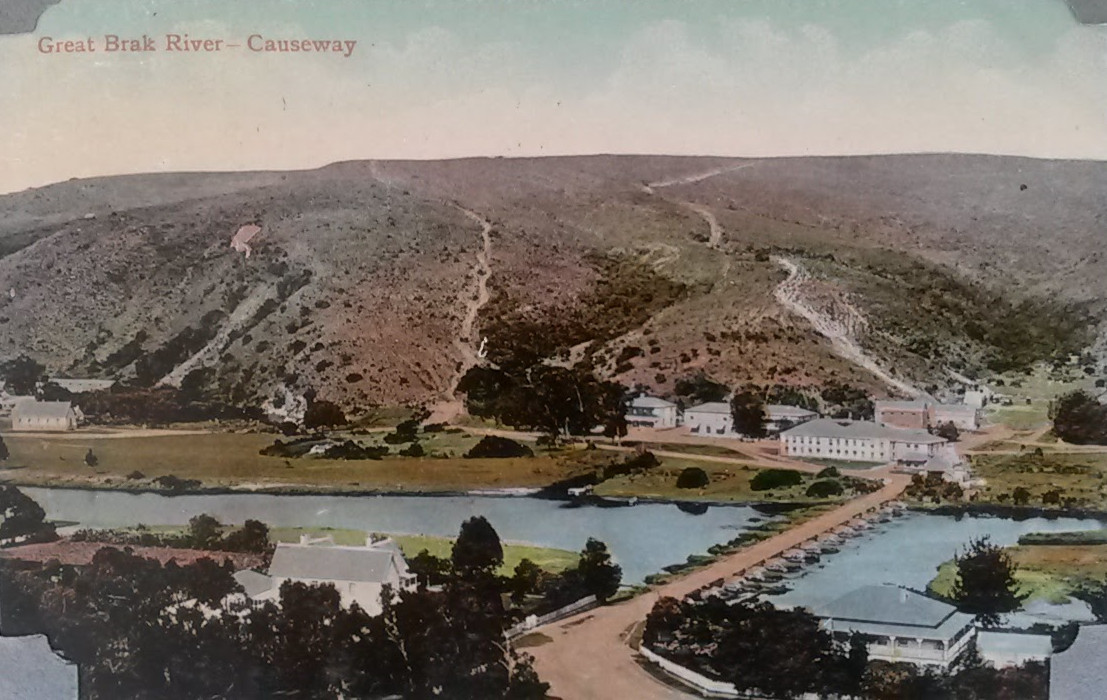

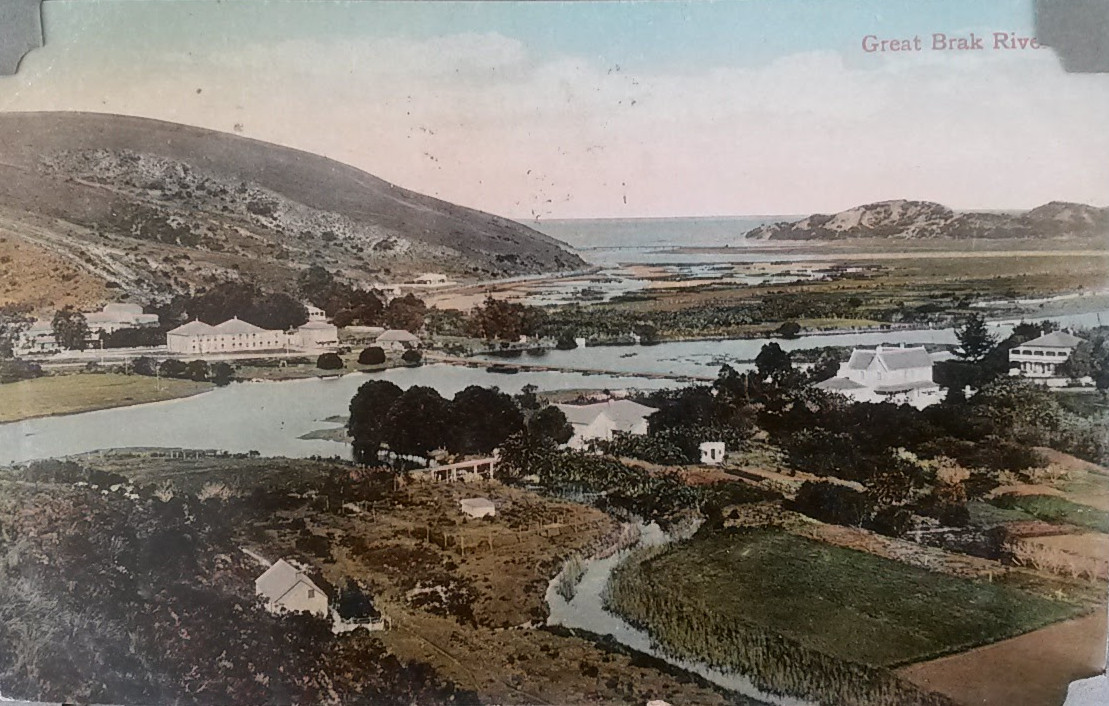

== Geography ==
=== Topography ===
The Great Brak River and its tributaries rises on the slopes of the Engelsberg and Jonkersberg (Varings River) in the Outeniqua Mountain Range 25 km in a straight line from the Great Brak River mouth. The catchment is relatively long and narrow being about 25 km long and reaching a maximum of about 8 km wide. Much of the river drains an elevated coastal platform or platform or plateau 150–300 m above sea level. Below the Wolwedans dam the river enters a gorge which takes the form of a V which is indicative of a non-glacial valley.

Between the village of Great Brak and the Garden Route Freeway (N2 Highway) and other bridges the river enters the lagoon basin (estuary) about 1 km long and 0.5 km wide. The basin is bounded by the hilly coastal plain in the north and by an approximately 30 m high bush-covered dune ridge to the south. The dunes east of the mouth form a bluff about 50–60 m high consisting of 20 m basal dune rock, probably of Tertiary age, overlaid by a partly vegetated field of transverse barchan sand dunes. The Hersham residential area has been developed in this area.

== Churches ==
Great Brak churches include The Searles Memorial, St. John's Anglican Church, VGK, New Apostolic Church, Old Apostolic Church, United Congregational Church, NG Church and the Kingdom Hall of the Jehovah's Witnesses.

== Modern day ==
Today, Great Brak River is chiefly a holiday destination, with beaches and the lagoon providing the major attractions. The island residential area is linked to the mainland by a single lane bridge. Other highlights in Great Brak River include a local history museum, historic buildings built between 1852 and the mid-1930s, the Wolwedans Dam, and a restored power station dating back to the early 1900s. The 4-star Botlierskop Private Game Reserve is the biggest commercial attraction in the Great Brak area, along with several small shops and restaurants located in the town center. The 250 year old shoe factory of Bolton Footwear, originally started by the Searl family, is still in operation today in Groot Brak River and is one of the primary employers in the town.

== Transport ==
The town can easily be reached by vehicle using the N2 national highway that runs through the town. Great Brak River is halfway on the N2 between Mossel Bay to the west and George to the east. The nearest commercial airport is 15 km away at George Airport to the east.
