= Great Brak River (river) =

River in the Western Cape, South Africa

- Location of the Great Brak River's mouth
- Etymology: Afrikaans: brackish
- Native name: Groot Brakrivier (Afrikaans)

Location
- Country: South Africa
- Province: Western Cape
- Region: Garden Route
- District: Eden district
- Municipality: Mossel Bay municipality

Physical characteristics
- Mouth: Indian Ocean
  - location: Western Cape, South Africa
  - coordinates: 34°03′35″S 22°14′33″E
  - elevation: 0 m (0 ft)

The Great Brak River (Afrikaans: Groot-Brakrivier) is a river in the Western Cape, South Africa. The mouth of the river lies at the town of Great Brak River which falls under the Mossel Bay Municipality. The nearest towns are Mossel Bay, 24 km to the west, and the largest town in the region George, 34 km to the east by road.

The main tributaries of the Great Brak are the Perdeberg River, Tweeriviere River and Varings River. The Wolwedans Dam is the only dam in the river.

== History ==
In 1734 Jan de la Fontaine, Governor of the Cape Province, claimed Mossel Bay for the Dutch East India Company and the Great Brak River was proclaimed the eastern boundary of the Cape.

== See also ==
- List of rivers of South Africa
- List of reservoirs and dams in South Africa
