= Little Brak River (town) =

Little Brak River Klein-Brakrivier
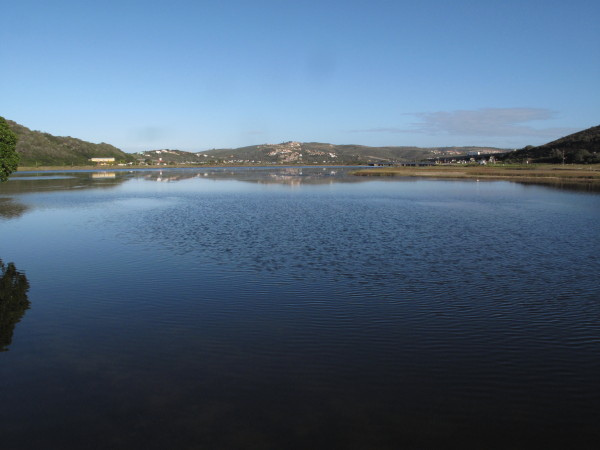
- Little Brak

- Location within Western Cape Location within South Africa
- Coordinates: 34°05′16″S 22°08′52″E
- Country: South Africa
- Province: Western Cape
- District: Garden Route
- Municipality: Mossel Bay

Area
  - Total: 3.45 km^{2} (1.33 sq mi)

Population (2011)
  - Total: 2,037
  - Density: 590/km^{2} (1,530/sq mi)

Racial makeup (2011)
  - Black African: 5.7%
  - Coloured: 25.7%
  - Indian/Asian: 0.2%
  - White: 67.9%
  - Other: 0.4%

First languages (2011)
  - Afrikaans: 85.0%
  - English: 12.6%
  - Other: 2.3%
- Time zone: UTC+2 (SAST)
- PO box: 6503

Little Brak River (Afrikaans: Klein-Brakrivier) is a settlement in Garden Route District Municipality in the Western Cape province of South Africa.

A seaside resort and town at the mouth of the Little Brak River from which it takes its name. Little Brak River lies on the famous Garden Route, approximately 13km north of Mossel Bay. The form Klein-Brakrivier is preferred for official use.

The noted ballet dancer Dulcie Howes was born in Little Brak River in 1908.
