= Friemersheim =

- Location within Western Cape Location within South Africa
- Coordinates: 33°57′19″S 22°08′33″E
- Country: South Africa
- Province: Western Cape
- District: Garden Route
- Municipality: Mossel Bay

Government
  - Councillor: Donovan Claassen (DA)

Area
  - Total: 2.33 km^{2} (0.90 sq mi)

Population (2011)
  - Total: 1,235
  - Density: 530/km^{2} (1,370/sq mi)

Racial makeup (2011)
  - Black African: 0.6%
  - Coloured: 94.3%
  - Indian/Asian: 0.4%
  - White: 2.4%
  - Other: 2.2%

First languages (2011)
  - Afrikaans: 97.7%
  - Other: 2.3%
- Time zone: UTC+2 (SAST)
- Postal code (street): 6525
- PO box: 6526

Friemersheim is a settlement in Garden Route District Municipality in the Western Cape province of South Africa.

A small agricultural community about 15 kilometres (9.3 mi) from Groot-Brakrivier, Friemersheim was founded by a German missionary in the early 19th century. In 1869, through the efforts of Reverend Johann Kretzen of the Berliner Missionary Society, a school and church were built on the farm Gonnakraal, which Kretzen had bought for his sister.

After his sister's death in 1872, he bequeathed the farm to the Dutch Reformed Missionary Society, and it was later renamed Friemersheim, after Kretzen's town of birth in Germany. It remained in the ownership of the Dutch Reformed Church until the 1960s, when it was sold to the state.

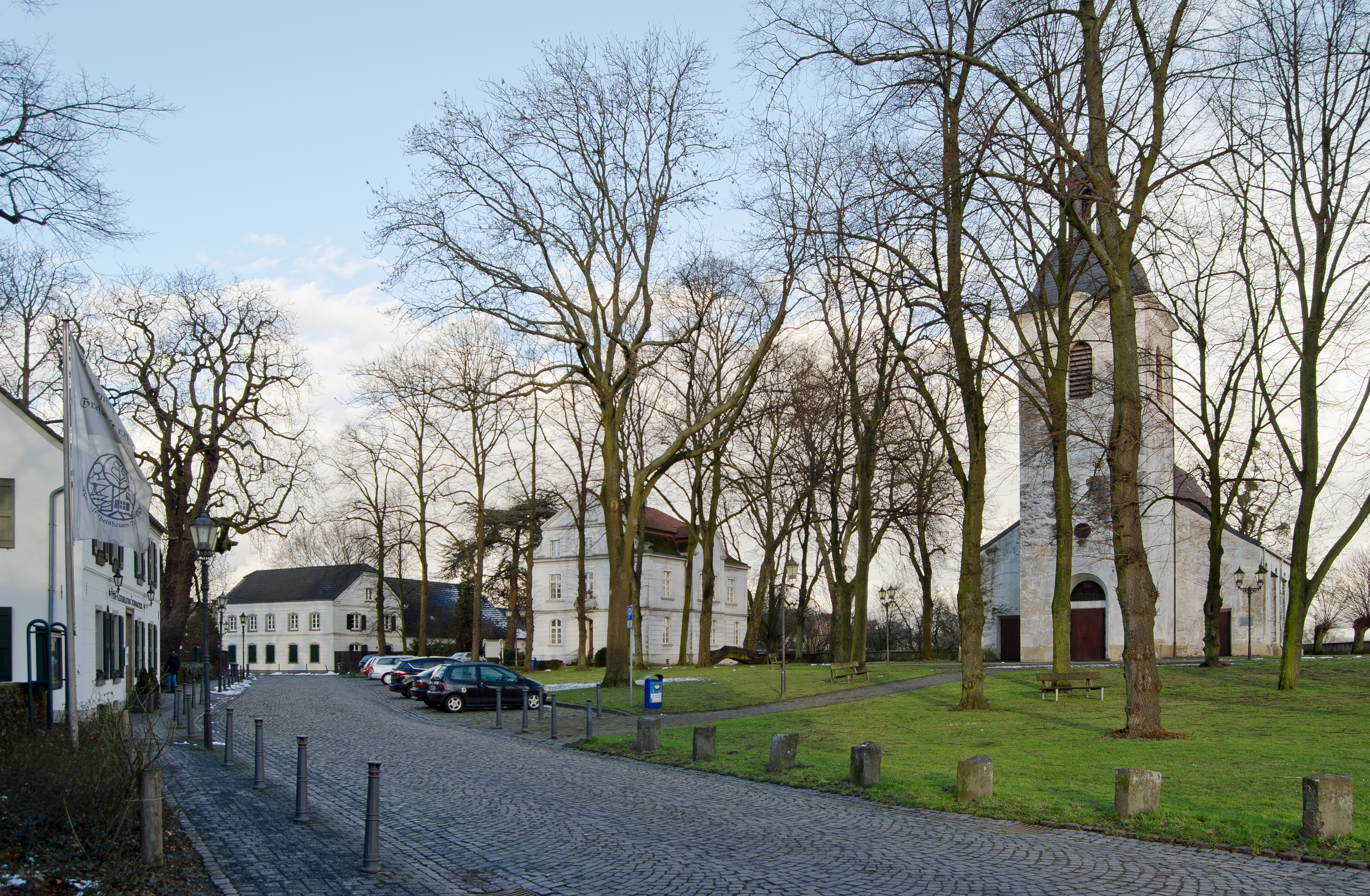
Friemersheim, in Germany, after which Friemersheim was named.
