= Brandwag, Mossel Bay =

Brandwag
- Location within Western Cape Location within South Africa
- Coordinates: 34.051°S 22.058°E
- Country: South Africa
- Province: Western Cape
- District: Garden Route
- Municipality: Mossel Bay

Area
  - Total: 1.05 km^{2} (0.41 sq mi)

Population (2011)
  - Total: 1,470
  - Density: 1,400/km^{2} (3,630/sq mi)

Racial makeup (2011)
  - Black African: 1.8%
  - Coloured: 90.0%
  - Indian/Asian: 1.0%
  - White: 6.7%
  - Other: 0.6%

First languages (2011)
  - Afrikaans: 94.0%
  - English: 3.4%
  - Tswana: 1.2%
  - Other: 1.4%
- Time zone: UTC+2 (SAST)
- Postal code (street): n/a
- PO box: n/a

Brandwag (also Brandwacht) is a town in Mossel Bay Local Municipality in the Western Cape province of South Africa.

The town is about 10 km north of Mossel Bay and 12 south of Ruiterbos.
