= List of municipalities in the Western Cape =

The Western Cape province of South Africa is divided, for local government purposes, into one metropolitan municipality (the City of Cape Town) and five district municipalities. The district municipalities are in turn divided into twenty-four local municipalities.

In the following interactive map, the district and metropolitan municipalities are labelled in capital letters and shaded in various different colours. Clicking on the district on the map loads the appropriate article:

Western Cape districts and local municipalities. Clicking on the district on the map loads the appropriate article.

== District and metropolitan municipalities ==
Name	Code	Seat	Area (km^{2})	Population (2016)	Pop. density (per km^{2})
Cape Winelands District Municipality	DC2	Worcester	21,473	866,001	40.3
Central Karoo District Municipality	DC5	Beaufort West	38,854	74,247	1.9
City of Cape Town Metropolitan Municipality	CPT	Cape Town	2,446	4,005,016	1,637.6
Garden Route District Municipality	DC4	George	23,331	611,278	26.2
Overberg District Municipality	DC3	Bredasdorp	12,239	286,786	23.4
West Coast District Municipality	DC1	Moorreesburg	31,119	436,403	14.0

== Local and metropolitan municipalities ==
Name	Code	District	Seat	Area (km^{2})	Population (2016)	Pop. density (per km^{2})
Beaufort West Local Municipality	WC053	Central Karoo	Beaufort West	21,917	51,080	2.3
Bergrivier Local Municipality	WC013	West Coast	Piketberg	4,407	67,474	15.3
Bitou Local Municipality	WC047	Garden Route	Plettenberg Bay	992	59,157	59.6
Breede Valley Local Municipality	WC025	Cape Winelands	Worcester	3,834	176,578	46.1
Cape Agulhas Local Municipality	WC033	Overberg	Bredasdorp	3,471	36,000	10.4
Cederberg Local Municipality	WC012	West Coast	Clanwilliam	8,007	52,949	6.6
City of Cape Town Metropolitan Municipality	CPT		Cape Town	2,446	4,005,016	1,637.6
Drakenstein Local Municipality	WC023	Cape Winelands	Paarl	1,538	280,195	182.2
George Local Municipality	WC044	Garden Route	George	5,191	208,237	40.1
Hessequa Local Municipality	WC042	Garden Route	Riversdale	5,733	54,237	9.5
Kannaland Local Municipality	WC041	Garden Route	Ladismith	4,765	24,168	5.1
Knysna Local Municipality	WC048	Garden Route	Knysna	1,109	73,835	66.6
Laingsburg Local Municipality	WC051	Central Karoo	Laingsburg	8,784	8,895	1.0
Langeberg Local Municipality	WC026	Cape Winelands	Ashton	4,518	105,483	23.3
Matzikama Local Municipality	WC011	West Coast	Vredendal	12,981	71,045	5.5
Mossel Bay Local Municipality	WC043	Garden Route	Mossel Bay	2,001	94,135	47.0
Oudtshoorn Local Municipality	WC045	Garden Route	Oudtshoorn	3,540	97,509	27.5
Overstrand Local Municipality	WC032	Overberg	Hermanus	1,675	93,407	55.8
Prince Albert Local Municipality	WC052	Central Karoo	Prince Albert	8,153	14,272	1.8
Saldanha Bay Local Municipality	WC014	West Coast	Vredenburg	2,015	111,173	55.2
Stellenbosch Local Municipality	WC024	Cape Winelands	Stellenbosch	831	173,197	208.4
Swartland Local Municipality	WC015	West Coast	Malmesbury	3,707	133,762	36.1
Swellendam Local Municipality	WC034	Overberg	Swellendam	3,835	40,211	10.5
Theewaterskloof Local Municipality	WC031	Overberg	Caledon	3,259	117,167	36.0
Witzenberg Local Municipality	WC022	Cape Winelands	Ceres	10,753	130,548	12.1

== See also ==
- List of Western Cape Municipalities by Human Development Index
