= List of Western Cape Municipalities by Human Development Index =

This is a list of municipalities of the Western Cape by Human Development Index.

== District municipalities ==
Human Development Index by district municipality of the Western Cape.

Rank	District Municipality	HDI
High human development
1	City of Cape Town	0.781
2	Garden Route	0.76
3	Overberg	0.75
–	Western Cape (average)	▲0.755
4	Cape Winelands	0.74
4	West Coast	0.74
5	Central Karoo	0.721
–	South Africa	▼0.713

== Local municipalities ==
Human Development Index by local municipality of the Western Cape.

Rank	Local Municipality	HDI
Very high human development
1	Hessequa	0.81
High human development
2	Swellendam	0.79
3	Bitou	0.78
3	City of Cape Town	0.78
3	Mossel Bay	0.78
4	Cape Agulhas	0.77
4	Knysna	0.77
5	George	0.76
5	Oudtshoorn	0.76
5	Saldanha Bay	0.76
6	Drakenstein	0.75
6	Overstrand	0.75
6	Stellenbosch	0.75
6	Theewaterskloof	0.75
–	Western Cape (average)	▲0.755
7	Bergrivier	0.74
7	Breede Valley	0.74
7	Matzikama	0.74
7	Swartland	0.74
8	Laingsburg	0.73
9	Beaufort West	0.72
9	Langeberg	0.72
10	Cederberg	0.71
10	Witzenberg	0.71
–	South Africa	▼0.713
Medium human development
11	Kannaland	0.69
