= Wolwedans Dam =

- Location within South Africa
- Official name: Wolwedans Dam
- Country: South Africa
- Location: Western Cape
- Coordinates: 34°0′49″S 22°13′0″E
- Purpose: Water supply
- Opening date: 1990
- Owner: Department of Water Affairs

Dam and spillways
- Type of dam: Arch-gravity
- Impounds: Great Brak River
- Height: 70 metres (230 ft)
- Length: 268 metres (879 ft)

Reservoir
- Creates: Wolwedans Dam Reservoir
- Total capacity: 25,530,000 cubic metres (902,000,000 cu ft)
- Catchment area: 123 km^{2}
- Surface area: 117 hectares (290 acres)

Wolwedans Dam is a concrete dam in South Africa located on the Great Brak River near Mossel Bay, Western Cape, South Africa. The dam is the main source of water for the municipality of Mossel Bay as well as the gas-to-liquids refinery PetroSA. The dam serves mainly for municipal and industrial water supply purposes.

== Design ==
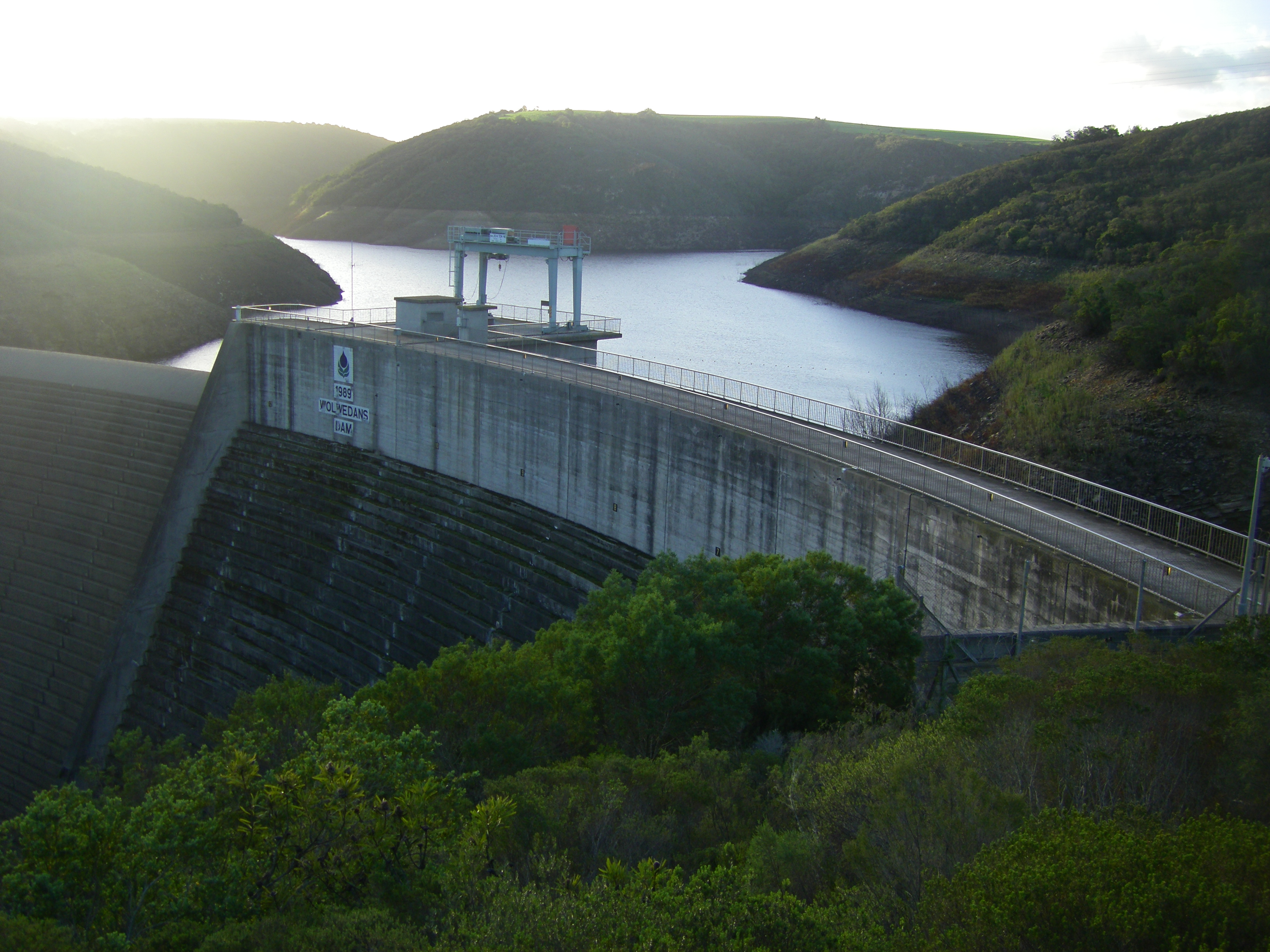
Wolwedans Dam

Completed in early 1990, it was the first in the world single center arch-gravity dam made of roller-compacted concrete fully relying on three-dimensional arch action for stability. The 70-m high dam has a vertical upstream face and a stepped downstream face at a slope of 0.5:1 (H:V). It has a constant extrados radius of 135 m and a crest length of 268 m. The non-overflow crest is 5 m wide. The dam was built of 0.25 m thick roller-compacted concrete layers with induced joints at 10 m spacing and de-bounding every 4th layer. The RCC of approximately 200,000 m^{3} (260,000 cu yd) was placed in October and November 1988 and between May and November 1989. The induced joints were grouted in winter, between July and November 1993. The reservoir was filled to capacity in 1992.

Composition of the high-paste RCC
Portland Cement	Fly Ash	Water	Coarse Aggregate	Fine Aggregate
kg/m^{3}	kg/m^{3}	kg/m^{3}	kg/m^{3}	kg/m^{3}
58	136	100	1510	625

The RCC mix properties were:

- RCC density: 2,400 kg/m^{3}
- Average 1-year RCC compressive strength: 35 MPa (5,076 psi)

== See also ==
- List of reservoirs and dams in South Africa
- List of rivers of South Africa
