= List of South African provinces by Human Development Index =

This is a list of the provinces of South Africa by Human Development Index.

South African provincial Human Development Indices (HDI), 2023

Rank	Province	HDI (2023) *
High human development
1	Western Cape	▲0.778
2	Gauteng	▲0.763
3	Free State	▲0.741
–	South Africa (average)	▲0.741
4	Limpopo	▲0.739
5	KwaZulu-Natal	▲0.736
6	Northern Cape	▲0.728
7	Mpumalanga	▲0.708
8	North West	▲0.705
9	Eastern Cape	▲0.703

* Change since last dataset (2020)

== Historical data ==
Province	1990	1995	2000	2005	2010	2015	2020
Western Cape	0.711	0.745	0.705	0.689	0.717	0.753	0.766
Gauteng	0.696	0.729	0.692	0.681	0.714	0.741	0.750
Free State	0.648	0.677	0.646	0.637	0.672	0.714	0.726
Limpopo	0.598	0.623	0.604	0.612	0.663	0.715	0.727
KwaZulu-Natal	0.589	0.615	0.594	0.604	0.656	0.710	0.724
Northern Cape	0.625	0.654	0.624	0.618	0.655	0.702	0.715
Mpumalanga	0.609	0.635	0.610	0.608	0.649	0.683	0.692
North West	0.626	0.654	0.624	0.615	0.648	0.681	0.690
Eastern Cape	0.581	0.606	0.583	0.586	0.631	0.677	0.688
South Africa	0.632	0.661	0.633	0.632	0.675	0.716	0.727
