= Glentana =

- Location within Western Cape Location within South Africa
- Coordinates: 34°03′S 22°19′E
- Country: South Africa
- Province: Western Cape
- District: Garden Route
- Municipality: Mossel Bay

Area
  - Total: 2.39 km^{2} (0.92 sq mi)

Population (2011)
  - Total: 544
  - Density: 228/km^{2} (590/sq mi)

Racial makeup (2011)
  - Black African: 1.5%
  - Coloured: 21.2%
  - White: 77.3%

First languages (2011)
  - Afrikaans: 77.6%
  - English: 20.1%
  - Other: 2.3%
- Time zone: UTC+2 (SAST)

Glentana is a village on the Indian Ocean coast to the southwest of George in the Western Cape province of South Africa.

The village was established in the early 20th century, when the first houses in the area were built. The origin of the town's name is unclear, but it is believed to be related to a whiskey distilled in Northern Scotland which carries the same name.
