= Dirk Kotzé =

South African politician, businessman and farmer

Alderman Dirk Kotzé
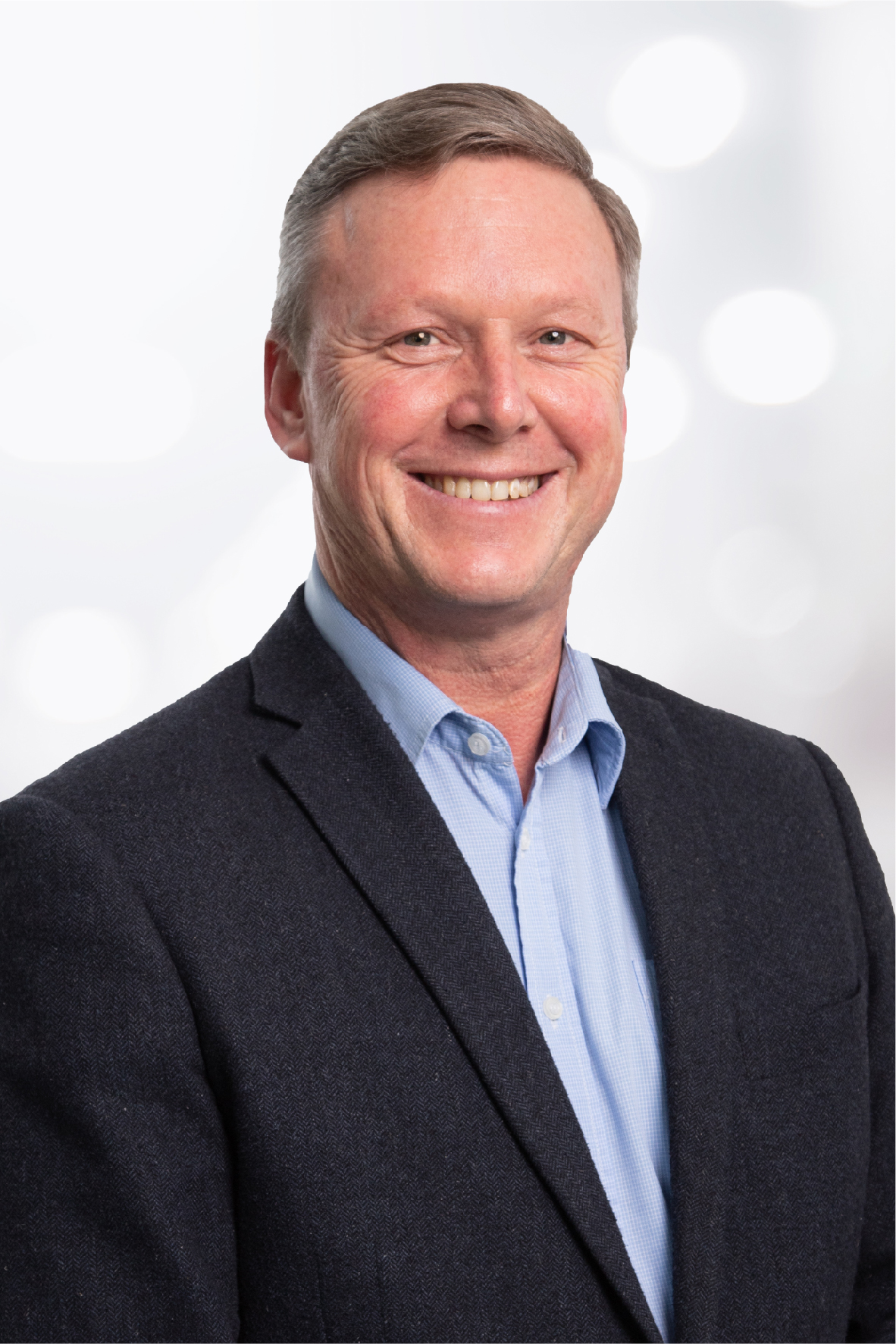
- Kotzé in 2021

Executive Mayor of the Mossel Bay Local Municipality
- Incumbent
- Assumed office 10 November 2021
- Deputy: Cliffie Bayman
- Preceded by: Harry Levendal

Deputy Executive Mayor of the Mossel Bay Local Municipality
- In office 16 August 2016 – 10 November 2021
- Preceded by: Harry Levendal
- Succeeded by: Cliffie Bayman

Personal details
- Born: Worcester, South Africa
- Party: Democratic Alliance
- Spouse: Riëtte
- Children: 1
- Profession: Politician; Businessman; Farmer

Dirk Kotzé is a South African politician, businessman and farmer serving as the Executive Mayor of the Mossel Bay Local Municipality since November 2021. As a member of the Democratic Alliance, he previously served as the deputy mayor of the municipality from 2016 to 2021.

== Early life ==
Kotzé was born in Worcester. He has two sisters and a brother. He received his primary school education in De Aar and his high school education in Colesberg.

== Career ==
After high school, he started and operated a business. In August 2013, Kotzé was selected as the DA's candidate for a by-election in ward 8 in the Mossel Bay Local Municipality on 18 September 2013. He won the election with 64.45% of the vote. Prior to the municipal elections on 3 August 2016, Kotzé was announced as the DA's candidate for deputy mayor of the municipality. The DA retained their majority on the council in the election. At the inaugural council meeting on 16 August 2016, Kotzé was elected and sworn in as deputy mayor. He became acting mayor in September 2020 after mayor Levendal was placed on leave for medical reasons.

On 28 August 2021, Kotzé was announced as the DA's mayoral candidate for Mossel Bay for the local government election of 1 November 2021. The DA retained control of the municipality with 66% of the vote. On 10 November, Kotzé was elected mayor. He became the first mayor in the Western Cape to be elected after the election. The Western Cape Provincial Minister of Agriculture, Ivan Meyer draped the mayoral robe over Kotzé's shoulders.

== Personal life ==
Kotzé is married to Riëtte. They have one son. He has been living in the Mossel Bay area for more than two decades. He first lived in Suiderkruis in Great Brak for five years, before he moved to Mossel Bay.
