= Mossel Bay Local Municipality =

Mossel Bay Mosselbaai
- Local municipality
- Seal

- Location in the Western Cape
- Coordinates: 34°05′S 22°00′E
- Country: South Africa
- Province: Western Cape
- District: Garden Route
- Seat: Mossel Bay
- Wards: 14

Government
  - Type: Municipal council
  - Mayor: Dirk Kotzé (DA)

Area
  - Total: 2,011 km^{2} (776 sq mi)

Population (2022)
  - Total: 140,075
  - Density: 69.65/km^{2} (180.4/sq mi)

Racial makeup (2022)
  - Black African: 29.4%
  - Coloured: 34.5%
  - Indian/Asian: 0.3%
  - White: 34.1%

First languages (2011)
  - Afrikaans: 67.6%
  - Xhosa: 21.5%
  - English: 6.5%
  - Sotho: 1.3%
  - Other: 3.1%
- Time zone: UTC+2 (SAST)
- Municipal code: WC043
- Website: mosselbay.gov.za

Mossel Bay Municipality (Afrikaans: Mosselbaai Munisipaliteit; Xhosa: uMasipala wase Mossel Bayi) is a local municipality within the Garden Route District Municipality, in the Western Cape province of South Africa. As of 2022, the population was 140,075.

== Geography ==
The municipality covers an area of 2,011 square kilometres (776 sq mi) on the coastal plain between the Outeniqua Mountains and the sea. It stretches from the Gourits River in the west to beyond the Great Brak River in the east. It is drained by the Gourits, Hartenbos, Little Brak and Great Brak Rivers. It abuts on the Hessequa Municipality to the west, the Oudtshoorn Municipality to the north and the George Municipality to the east.

== Demographics ==
The 2022 South African census reported a population of 140,075 people in the municipality. This represented an average annual increase of 4.4% from 2011. Those identifying as "Coloured" comprised 34.5% of the population, followed by "Whites" at 34.1%, and "Black Africans," at 29.4%. With over one-third of the population identifying as White, Mossel Bay had a higher proportion of Whites than any other municipality in South Africa.

According to the 2011 census the municipality has a population of 89,430 people in 28,025 households. Of this population, 43.5% describe themselves as "Coloured", 29.5% as "Black African", and 25.5% as "White". The first language of 67.6% of the population is Afrikaans, while 21.5% speak Xhosa, 6.5% speak English and 1.3% speak Sotho.

The principal town is Mossel Bay on the Cape St Blaize peninsula, which as of 2011 has a population of 59,031. Northeast of Mossel Bay is a string of coastal resorts along the shores of the bay: Hartenbos (pop. 4,196), Little Brak River (pop. 2,037), Reebok (pop. 1,112), Tergniet (pop. 1,264) and Great Brak River (pop. 10,619). To the southwest of Mossel Bay are the smaller coastal villages of Boggomsbaai (pop. 69) and Vleesbaai (pop. 193). Herbertsdale (pop. 666), Brandwag (pop. 1,470) and Friemersheim (pop. 1,235) are situated in the interior of the municipality closer to the mountains.

== History ==
At the end of the apartheid era, the area that is today the Mossel Bay Municipality formed part of the South Cape Regional Services Council (RSC). The towns of Mossel Bay, Hartenbos, Great Brak River and Herbertsdale were governed by municipal councils elected by their white residents. The coloured residents of D'Almeida (Mossel Bay) and Great Brak River were governed by management committees subordinate to the white councils. Kwanonqaba was governed by a town council established under the Black Local Authorities Act, 1982. The smaller coastal resorts were governed by local councils: a council for Boggomsbaai, a council covering Little Brak River, Reebok and Tergniet, and another council named Gleniqua covering Glentana, Outeniquastrand and Bothastrand. The former missionary settlement of Friemersheim was governed by a board of management.

While the negotiations to end apartheid were taking place a process was established for local authorities to agree on voluntary mergers. In March 1992, the Municipality of Great Brak River, the Great Brak River Management Committee and the Gleniqua Local Council merged into a single Municipality for the Area of Great Brak River.

After the national elections of 1994 a process of local government transformation began, in which negotiations were held between the existing local authorities, political parties, and local community organisations. As a result of these negotiations, the existing local authorities were dissolved and transitional local councils (TLCs) were created for each town and village. The smaller seaside resorts were also combined with larger towns.

- Herbertsdale TLC replaced the Municipality of Herbertsdale in December 1994.
- Friemersheim TLC replaced the Friemersheim Management Board in January 1995.
- Mossel Bay TLC replaced the Municipalities of Mossel Bay and Hartenbos, the D'Almeida Management Committee, the Kwanonqaba Town Council, the Boggomsbaai Local Council, and the Klein Brak River, Reebok and Tergniet Local Council in February 1995.
- Great Brak River TLC replaced the Municipality for the Area of Great Brak River in February 1995.

The transitional councils were initially made up of members nominated by the various parties to the negotiations, until May 1996 when elections were held. At the time of these elections the South Cape District Council was established in place of the South Cape RSC, and transitional representative councils (TRCs) were elected to represent rural areas outside the TLCs on the District Council. The area that was to become Mossel Bay Municipality included the Mossel Bay TRC and a small part of the Outeniqua TRC.

At the local elections of December 2000 the TLCs and TRCs were dissolved and the Mossel Bay Municipality was established as a single local authority. At the same election the South Cape District Council was dissolved and replaced by the Eden District Municipality.

== Politics ==
The municipal council consists of thirty-three members elected by mixed-member proportional representation. Seventeen councillors are elected by first-past-the-post voting in seventeen wards, while the remaining sixteen are chosen from party lists so that the total number of party representatives is proportional to the number of votes received.

The following table shows the results of the 2026 election.

Party	Ward			List			Total seats
Party	Votes	%	Seats	Votes	%	Seats	Total seats
Democratic Alliance	31,765	66.24	13	31,680	66.06	8	21
African National Congress	4,888	10.19	4	4,852	10.12	0	4
Freedom Front Plus	4,688	9.78	0	4,693	9.79	3	3
Patriotic Alliance	4,250	8.86	0	4,344	9.06	3	3
South African Communist Party	690	1.44	0	698	1.46	1	1
Economic Freedom Fighters	617	1.29	0	599	1.25	1	1
10 other parties	1,060	2.21	0	1,091	2.27	0	0
Total	47,958	100.00	17	47,957	100.00	16	33
Valid votes	47,958	99.37		47,957	99.34		
Invalid/blank votes	303	0.63		318	0.66		
Total votes	48,261	100.00		48,275	100.00		
Registered voters/turnout	79,938	60.37		79,938	60.39		

== Crime and corruption ==
In 2007, crime figures revealed that Mossel Bay recorded the lowest crime rates in the country. Between August 2006 and July 2007, there were no murders, hijackings, or business robberies. The low unemployment rate has been cited as a factor for the low crime rates. In 2018 two minicipal workers were arrested after swindling the municipality out of R138,000 by changing the amounts charged for grave sites. Each received a three year jail sentence.
