= Western Cape =

Province of South Africa

Western Cape: Wes-Kaap (Afrikaans); iNtshona-Koloni (Xhosa); Huri!hub (Khoekhoe)
- Province
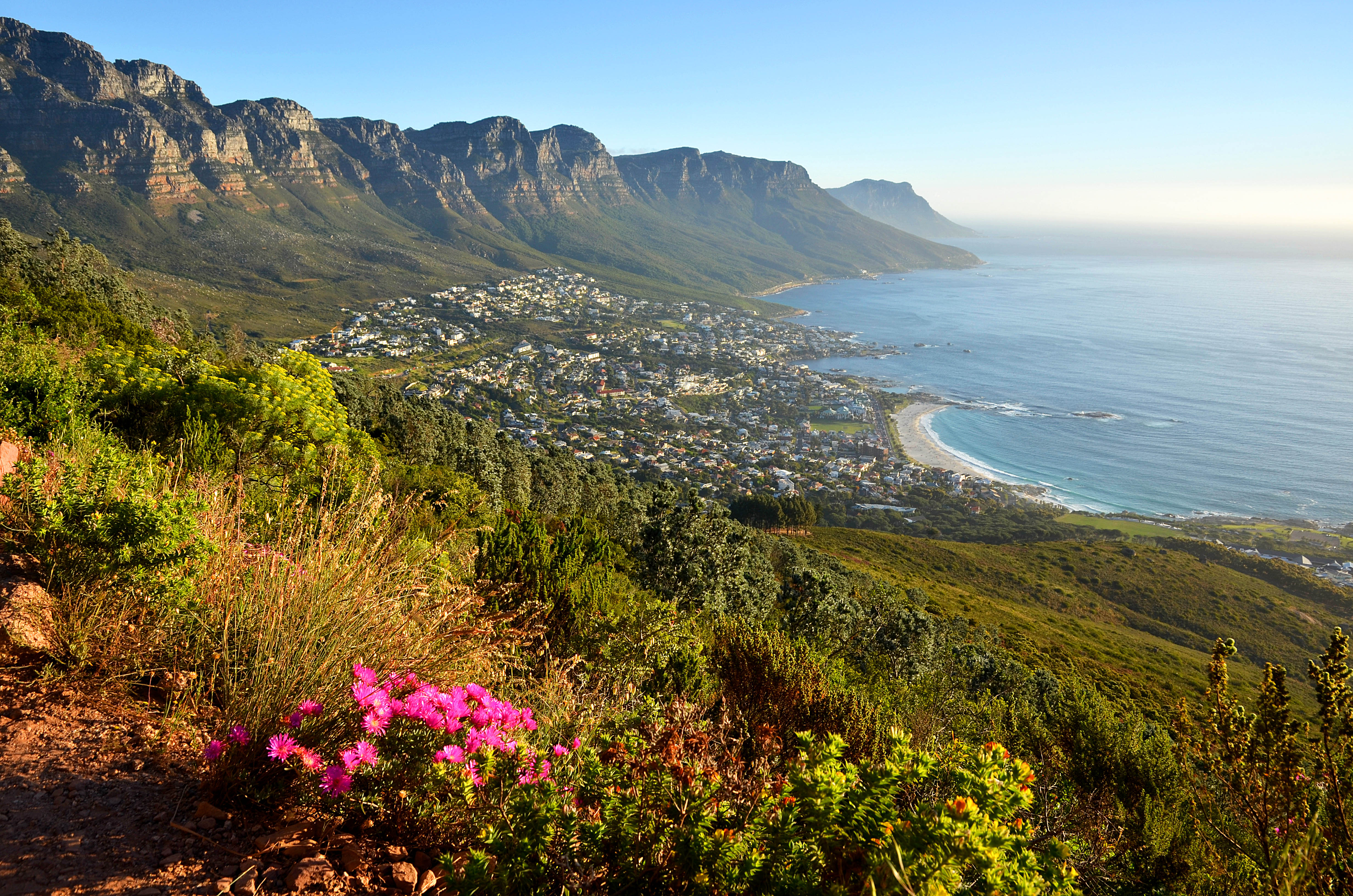
- Fynbos in the Atlantic Seaboard, Cape Town

- Coat of arms
- Motto: Spes Bona (Latin: Good Hope)
- Map showing the location of the Western Cape in the south-western part of South Africa in red
- Coordinates: 34°S 20°E
- Country: South Africa
- Established: 27 April 1994; 32 years ago
- Capital: Cape Town
- Municipalities: List: City of Cape Town; West Coast; Cape Winelands; Overberg; Garden Route; Central Karoo

Government
  - Type: Parliamentary system
  - Premier: Alan Winde (DA)
  - Legislature: Western Cape Provincial Parliament

Area
  - Total: 129,462 km^{2} (49,986 sq mi)
  - Rank: 4th in South Africa
- Highest elevation: 2,325 m (7,628 ft)
- Lowest elevation: 0 m (0 ft)

Population (2022)
  - Total: 7,433,020
  - Rank: 3rd in South Africa
  - Density: 57.4147/km^{2} (148.703/sq mi)
  - Rank: 4th in South Africa

Population groups (2022)
  - Coloured: 42.1%
  - Black: 38.8%
  - White: 16.4%
  - Indian or Asian: 1.1%

Languages (2022)
  - Afrikaans: 41.2%
  - Xhosa: 31.4%
  - English: 22.0%
- Time zone: UTC+2 (SAST)
- ISO 3166 code: ZA-WC
- GDP (2024): ▲ R666.75 billion
- HDI (2023): ▲0.778 high · 1st of 9
- Gini (2024): ▼0.595 high
- Website: westerncape.gov.za

Western Cape
- Zulu: iNshonalanga Kapa
- Xhosa: iNtshona-Koloni
- Afrikaans: Wes-Kaap
- Sepedi: Kapa Bodikela
- Swazi: Nshonalanga eKapa
- Sesotho: Kapa Bophirimela
- Setswana: Kapa Bophirima
- Xitsonga: Kapa Vupela-dyambu
- Venda: Kapa Vhukovhela
- Southern Ndebele: eTjhingalanga Kapa
- Khoekhoe: Huri!hub

The Western Cape (Afrikaans: Wes-Kaap [ˈvɛskɑːp]; Xhosa: iNtshona-Kolini; Khoekhoe: Huri!hub) is a province of South Africa, situated on the south-western coast of the country. It is geographically the fourth largest of the country's nine provinces, with an area of 129,449 square kilometres (49,981 sq mi), and the third most populous, with an estimated 7.43 million inhabitants in 2022.

About two-thirds of the province's residents live in the metropolitan area of Cape Town, which is also the provincial capital, and South Africa's second-largest city. The Western Cape was created in 1994 from part of the former Cape Province. The two largest cities are Cape Town and George.

The Western Cape is generally regarded as the best-run of South Africa's provinces, with a robust system of governance, proactive administration, high quality infrastructure, and strong political and civil accountability. The province also has South Africa's lowest unemployment rate, by a significant margin.

As of the third quarter of 2023, the Western Cape's total real GDP was R656.27 billion, translating to 14.2% of South Africa's total GDP. The province has had the strongest-performing provincial economy in South Africa for a decade, with average annual growth rates well above the national average. Purchasing power is also strong in the Western Cape, with GDP per capita in the province significantly higher than the national average.

Furthermore, the Western Cape has South Africa's highest secondary education graduation rate. In the 2024 Governance Performance Index (GPI), the Western Cape achieved the highest scores across all categories, by a large degree.

Cape Town, the capital of the Western Cape, has the country's highest household incomes, lowest rate of unemployment, highest level of infrastructure investment, strongest service delivery performance, largest tourism appeal, and most robust real estate market.

== Geography ==
Topography of the Western Cape. The Roggeveld and Nuweveld mountains are part of the Great Escarpment (see diagrams below). The other mountain ranges belong to the Cape Fold Belt, also shown in the diagrams below. The Western Cape's inland boundary lies for the most part at the foot of the Great Escarpment.

The Western Cape is roughly L-shaped, extending north and east from the Cape of Good Hope, in the southwestern corner of South Africa. It stretches about 400 kilometres (250 mi) northwards along the Atlantic coast and about 500 kilometres (300 mi) eastwards along the South African south coast (Southern Indian Ocean). It is bordered on the north by the Northern Cape and on the east by the Eastern Cape.

The total land area of the province is 129,462 square kilometres (49,986 sq mi), about 10.6% of the country's total. It is roughly the size of England or the State of Louisiana. Its capital city and largest city is Cape Town, and some other major cities include Stellenbosch, Worcester, Paarl, and George. The Garden Route and the Overberg are popular coastal tourism areas.

The Western Cape is the southernmost region of the African continent with Cape Agulhas as its southernmost point, only 3,800 kilometres (2,400 mi) from the Antarctic coastline. The coastline varies from sandy between capes, to rocky to steep and mountainous in places. The only natural harbour is Saldanha Bay on the west coast, about 140 kilometres (90 mi) north of Cape Town. However a lack of fresh water in the region meant that it has only recently been used as a harbour.

The province's main harbour was built in Table Bay, which in its natural state was fully exposed to the northwesterly storms that bring rain to the province in winter, as well as the almost uninterrupted dry southeasterly winds in summer. But fresh water coming off Table Mountain and Devil's Peak allowed the early European settlers to build Cape Town on the shores of this less than satisfactory anchorage.

=== Topography ===
The province is topographically exceptionally diverse. Most of the province falls within the Cape Fold Belt, a set of nearly parallel ranges of sandstone folded mountains of Cambrian-Ordovician age (the age of the rocks is from 510 to about 330 million years ago; their folding into mountains occurred about 350 to about 270 million years ago).

The height of the mountain peaks in the different ranges varies from 1,000 metres (3,300 ft) to 2,300 metres (7,500 ft). The valleys between ranges are generally very fertile, as they contain the weathered loamy soils of the Bokkeveld mudstones (see the diagrams below).

The far interior forms part of the Karoo. This region of the province is generally arid and hilly, with a prominent escarpment that runs close to the Province's most inland boundary.

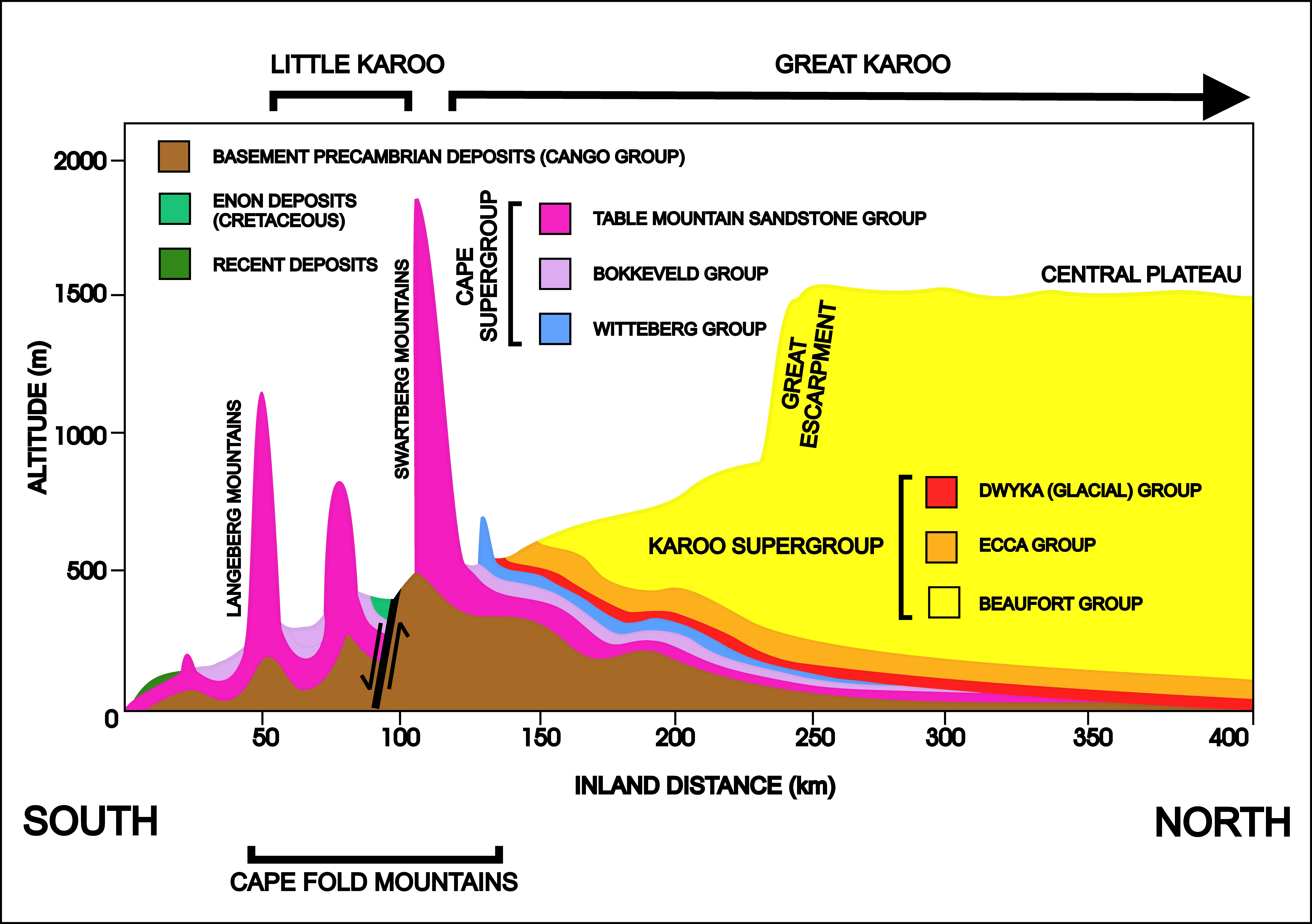
A diagrammatic 400 km south–north crosssection through the Cape at approximately 21° 30' E (i.e. near Calitzdorp in the Little Karoo), showing the relationship between the Cape Fold Mountains (and their geological structure) and the geology of the Little and Great Karoo, as well as the position of the Great Escarpment. The colour code for the geological layers is the same as those used in the diagram above. The heavy black line flanked by opposing arrows is the fault that runs for nearly 300 km along the southern edge of the Swartberg Mountains. The Swartberg Mountain range owes some of its great height to upliftment along this fault line. The subsurface structures are not to scale.

==== Escarpment ====
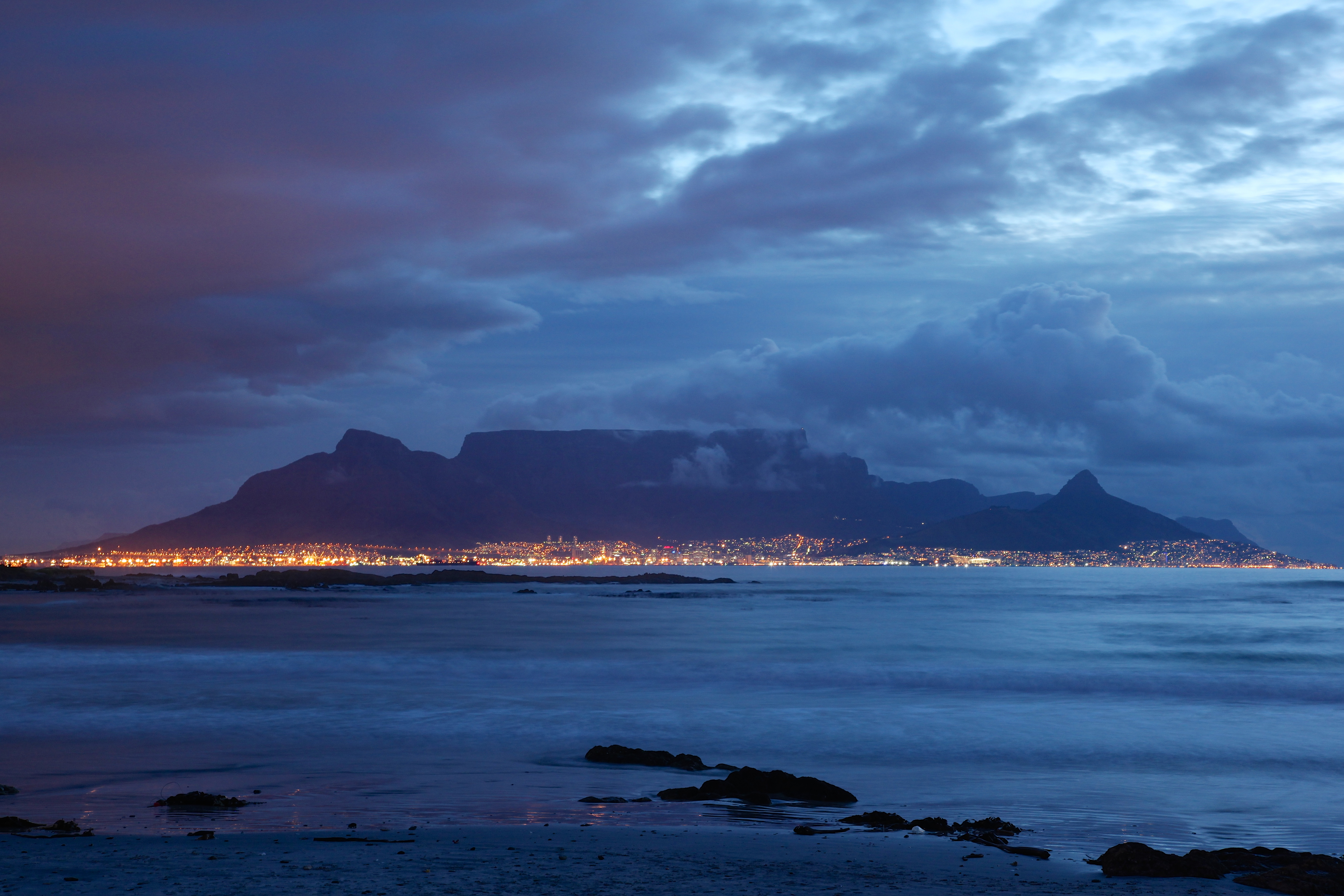
View of Table Mountain at night.

The escarpment marks the southwestern edge of South Africa's central plateau (see the middle and bottom diagrams on the left). It runs parallel to the entire South African coastline, except in the very far northeast, where it is interrupted by the Limpopo River valley, and in the far northwest, where it is interrupted by the Orange River valley. The 1,000-kilometre-long (620 mi) northeastern stretch of the escarpment is called the Drakensberg, which is geographically and geologically quite distinct from the Cape Fold Mountains, which originated much earlier and totally independently of the origin of the escarpment.

==== Rivers ====
The principal rivers of the province are the Berg and Olifants which drain into the Atlantic Ocean, and the Breede and Gourits which drain into the Indian Ocean.

=== Flora ===
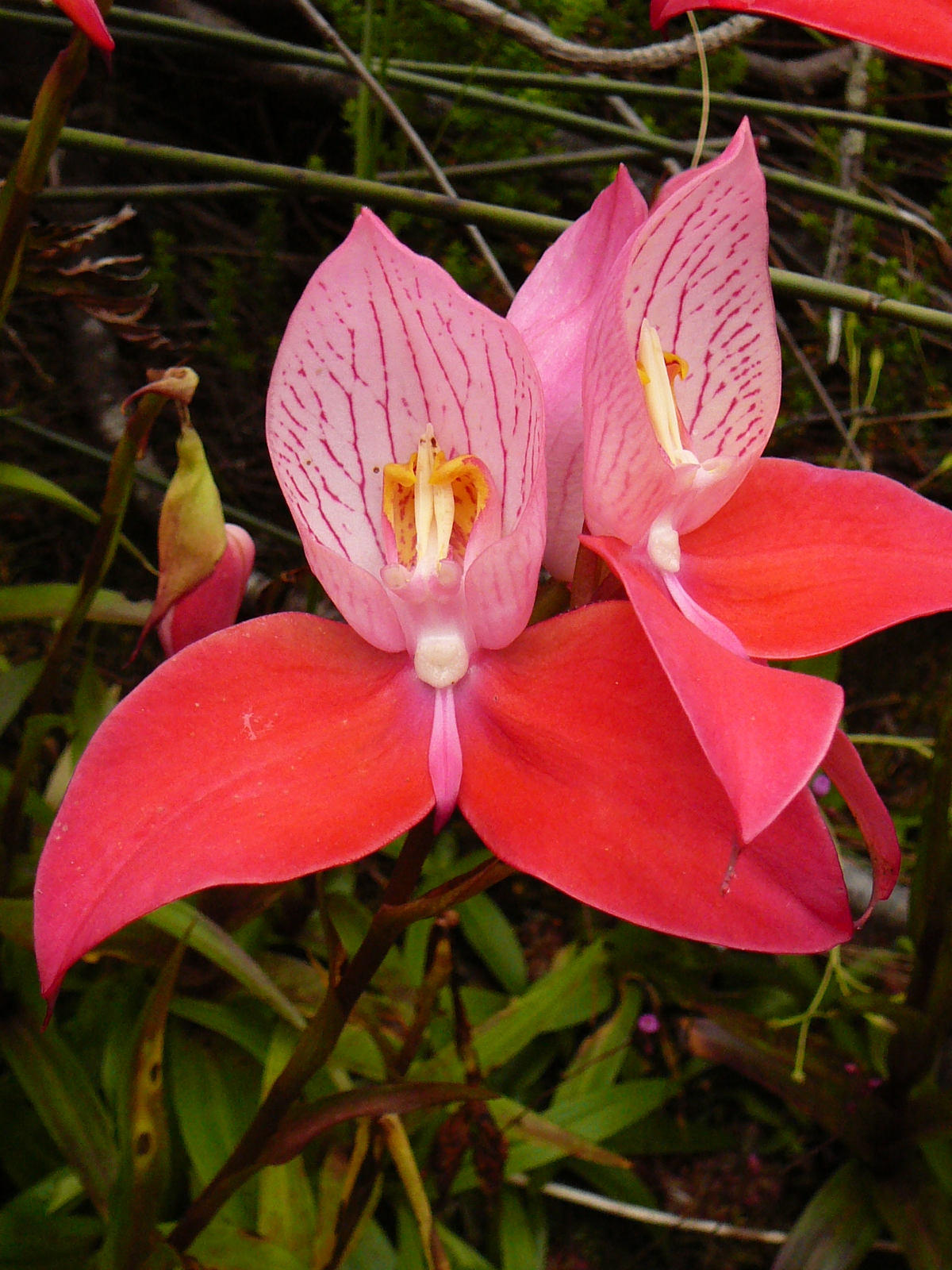
The Red Disa (disa uniflora) is an orchid endemic to the Western Cape. It is the province's official flower.

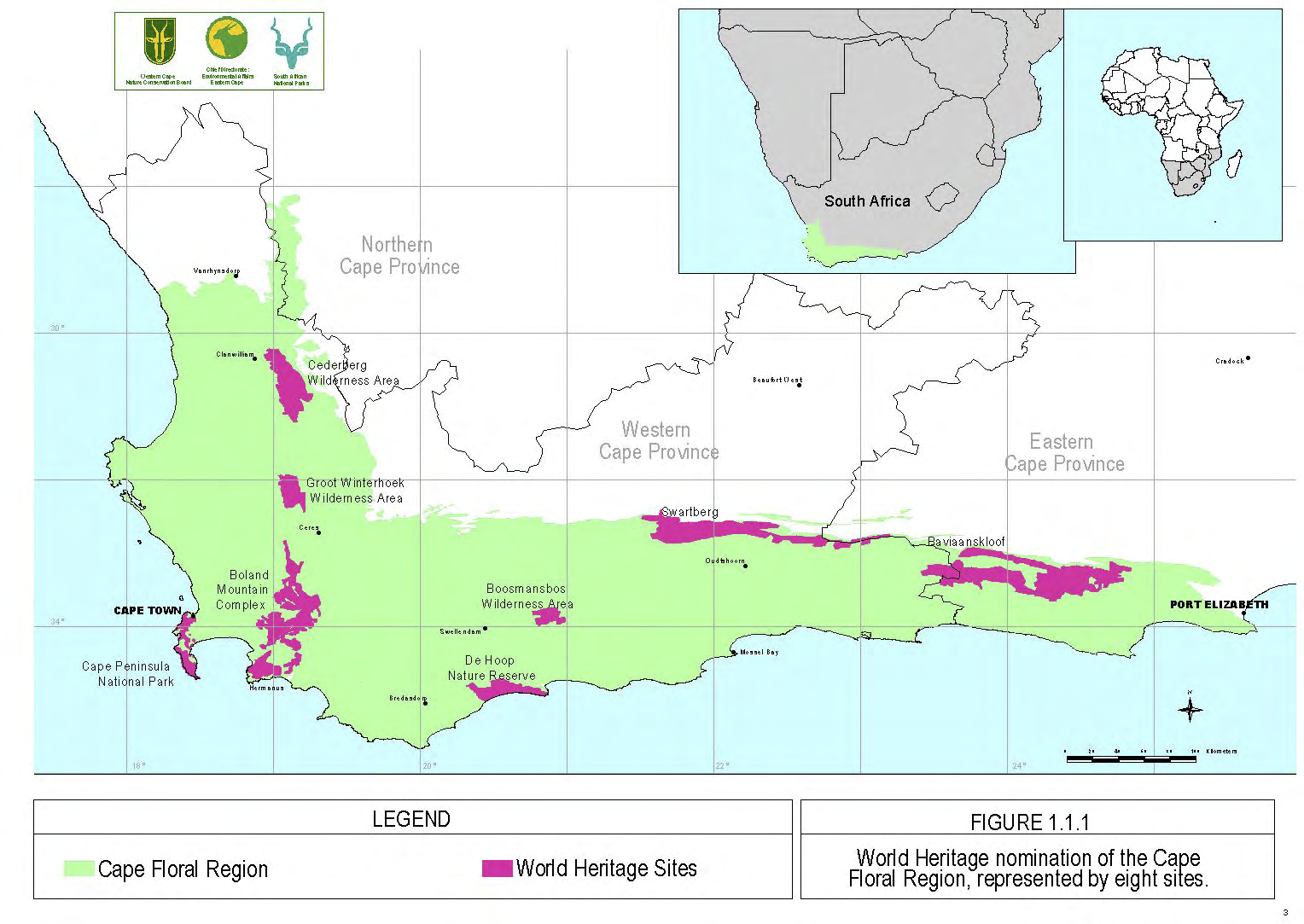
The Cape Floral Kingdom is one of the world's most diverse, and is found exclusively in the Cape.

The vegetation of the region is also extremely diverse, with one of the world's six floral kingdoms almost exclusively endemic to the province, namely the Cape Floral Kingdom, most of which is covered by Fynbos (from the Afrikaans meaning "Fine Bush" (Dutch: Fijnbos), though precisely how it came to be referred to as such, is uncertain.).

These evergreen heathlands are extremely rich in species diversity, with at least as many plant species occurring on Table Mountain as in the entire United Kingdom. It is characterised by various types of shrubs, thousands of herbaceous flowering plant species and some grasses. With the exception of the silver tree (Leucadendron argenteum), which only grows on the granite and clay soils of the Cape Peninsula, open fynbos is generally treeless aside from the wetter mountain ravines where patches of Afrotemperate forest persist.

The arid interior is dominated by Karoo drought-resistant shrubbery. The West Coast and Little Karoo are semi-arid regions and are typified by many species of succulents and drought-resistant shrubs and acacia trees.

The Garden Route on the south coast (between the Outeniqua Mountains and the Southern Indian Ocean) is extremely lush, with temperate rainforest (or Afromontane Forest) covering many areas adjacent to the coast, in the deep river valleys and along the southern slopes of the Outeniqua mountain range. Typical species are hardwoods of exceptional height, such as Yellowwood, Stinkwood and Ironwood trees.

=== Climate ===
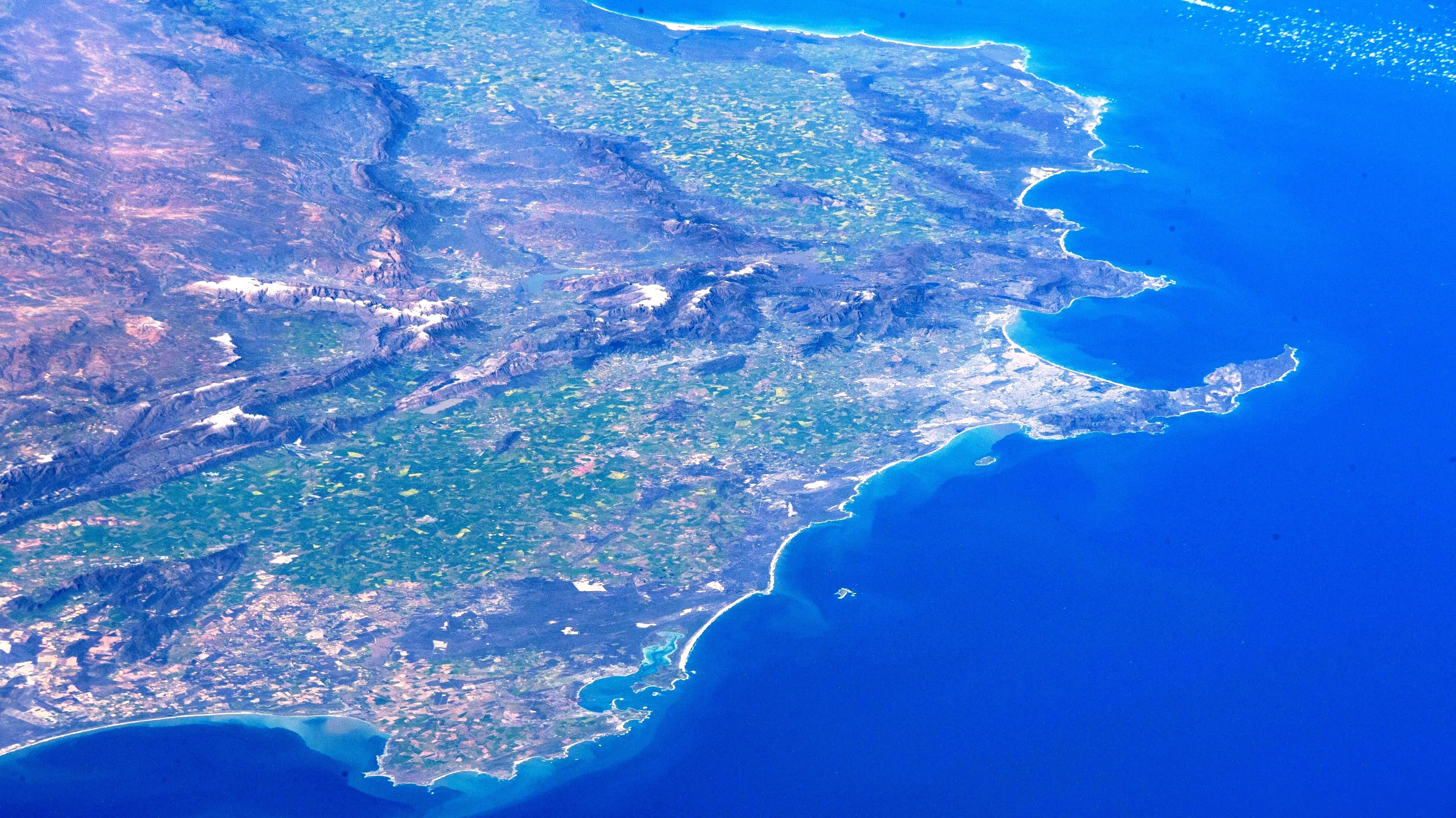
View of the Cape Peninsula and Boland region, seen from space

The Western Cape is climatologically diverse, with many distinct micro- and macroclimates created by the varied topography and the influence of the surrounding ocean currents. These are the warm Agulhas Current which flows southwards along South Africa's east coast, and the cold Benguela Current which is an upwelling current from the depths of the South Atlantic Ocean along South Africa's west coast.

Thus, climatic statistics can vary greatly over short distances. Most of the province is considered to have a Mediterranean climate with cool, wet winters and warm, dry summers.

Both the Great Karoo and Little Karoo, in the interior, have an arid to semi-arid climate with cold, frosty winters and hot summers with occasional thunderstorms. The Garden Route and the Overberg on the south coast have a maritime climate with cool, moist winters and mild, moist summers. Mossel Bay in the Garden Route is considered to have the second mildest climate worldwide after Hawaii. The La Niña phase of the El Niño-Southern Oscillation cycle tends to increase rainfall in this region in the dry season (November to April).

The effects of El Niño on rainfall in southern Africa differ between the summer and winter rainfall areas. Winter rainfall areas tend to get higher rainfall than normal and summer rainfall areas tend to get less rain. The effect on the summer rainfall areas is stronger and has led to severe drought in strong El Niño events.

Sea surface temperatures off the west and south coasts of South Africa are affected by ENSO via changes in surface wind strength. During El Niño the south-easterly winds driving upwelling are weaker which results in warmer coastal waters than normal, while during La Niña the same winds are stronger and cause colder coastal waters.

These effects on the winds are part of large scale influences on the tropical Atlantic and the South Atlantic High-pressure system, and changes to the pattern of westerly winds further south. There are other influences not known to be related to ENSO of similar importance. Some ENSO events do not lead to the expected changes.

Thunderstorms are generally rare in the province (except in the Karoo) with most precipitation being of a frontal or orographic nature. Extremes of heat and cold are common inland, but rare near the coast. Snow is a common winter occurrence on the Western Cape Mountains occasionally reaching down into the more inland valleys. Otherwise, frost is relatively rare in coastal areas and many of the heavily cultivated valleys.

Climate data for Cape Town International Airport, elevation: 42m, normals for 1991–2020
Month	Jan	Feb	Mar	Apr	May	Jun	Jul	Aug	Sep	Oct	Nov	Dec	Year
Mean daily maximum °C (°F)	27.0 (80.6)	27.3 (81.1)	26.0 (78.8)	23.6 (74.5)	20.6 (69.1)	18.2 (64.8)	17.9 (64.2)	18.0 (64.4)	19.6 (67.3)	22.2 (72.0)	23.7 (74.7)	25.8 (78.4)	22.5 (72.5)
Daily mean °C (°F)	21.8 (71.2)	21.9 (71.4)	20.5 (68.9)	17.9 (64.2)	15.4 (59.7)	13.2 (55.8)	12.7 (54.9)	13.0 (55.4)	14.5 (58.1)	15.9 (60.6)	18.6 (65.5)	20.7 (69.3)	17.2 (62.9)
Mean daily minimum °C (°F)	16.6 (61.9)	16.5 (61.7)	15.0 (59.0)	12.2 (54.0)	10.2 (50.4)	8.1 (46.6)	7.4 (45.3)	7.9 (46.2)	9.4 (48.9)	11.5 (52.7)	13.4 (56.1)	15.6 (60.1)	12.0 (53.6)
Average precipitation mm (inches)	9.4 (0.37)	9.6 (0.38)	12.5 (0.49)	40.1 (1.58)	61.1 (2.41)	92.3 (3.63)	84.8 (3.34)	72.4 (2.85)	44.3 (1.74)	28.4 (1.12)	24.3 (0.96)	12.8 (0.50)	492 (19.37)
Average precipitation days (≥ 1.0 mm)	1.8	1.8	2.5	5.0	7.4	10.1	9.1	9.3	6.8	4.2	4	2.6	64.6
Mean monthly sunshine hours	352.3	304	289.7	240.1	196.7	175.9	197	206.2	228.4	283.5	302.8	338.4	3,115
Source: NOAA

George, Garden Route

Climate chart (precipitation, max. and min. temperature)
J	F	M	A	M	J	J	A	S	O	N	D
55 24 17	48 24 17	60 23 16	60 22 14	48 20 12	43 18 10	43 18 9	56 18 10	48 19 11	67 20 12	75 21 14	54 23 16
- █ Average max. and min. temperatures in °C
- █ Precipitation totals in mm
Imperial conversion
J	F	M	A	M	J	J	A	S	O	N	D
2.2 75 62	1.9 76 63	2.4 74 61	2.4 71 57	1.9 68 54	1.7 65 50	1.7 64 49	2.2 64 49	1.9 65 51	2.6 68 54	3 70 57	2.1 73 60
- █ Average max. and min. temperatures in °F
- █ Precipitation totals in inches

Saldanha, West Coast

Climate chart (precipitation, max. and min. temperature)
J	F	M	A	M	J	J	A	S	O	N	D
9 21 17	8 21 17	10 20 16	24 19 15	36 17 13	57 16 12	51 16 12	45 16 12	26 17 13	15 18 14	14 19 15	9 20 17
- █ Average max. and min. temperatures in °C
- █ Precipitation totals in mm
Imperial conversion
J	F	M	A	M	J	J	A	S	O	N	D
0.4 69 63	0.3 69 63	0.4 68 61	0.9 65 58	1.4 63 56	2.2 61 54	2 61 53	1.8 60 53	1 62 55	0.6 64 57	0.6 66 59	0.4 68 62
- █ Average max. and min. temperatures in °F
- █ Precipitation totals in inches

== Political history ==
=== Cape Liberal Tradition ===
The Cape has had a long tradition of holding liberal values. For example, the Cape Qualified Franchise before the Union of South Africa.

==== Cape Qualified Franchise ====
The Cape Qualified Franchise was the system of non-racial franchise that was adhered to in the Cape Colony, and in the Cape Province in the early years of the Union of South Africa. Qualifications for the right to vote at parliamentary elections were applied equally to all men, regardless of race.

This local system of multi-racial suffrage was later gradually restricted, and eventually abolished, under various National Party and United Party governments. In 1930, white women were enfranchised, and in 1931 property qualifications for white voters were removed.

In 1936, black voters were then removed from the common voters' rolls and allowed only to elect separate members in 1936, and subsequently denied all representation in the House of Assembly in 1960. Coloured voters similarly followed in 1958 and 1970, respectively.

==== Contribution of the Western Cape in the National Youth Uprisings ====
The Black Consciousness Movement (BCM) was a grassroots anti-Apartheid activist movement that emerged in South Africa in the mid-1960s out of the political vacuum created by the jailing and banning of the African National Congress and Pan Africanist Congress leadership after the Sharpeville Massacre in 1960. The BCM represented a social movement for political consciousness.

In December 1968, the South African Student Organization (SASO) was formed at a conference held in Marianhill, Natal. The conference was exclusively attended by Black students. After its launch, SASO became the medium through which black consciousness ideology spread to schools and other university campuses across the country.

In 1974, South African Minister of Bantu Education and Development MC Botha, constituted the imposition of using Afrikaans as a medium of instruction in black schools, effective with students in Grade 7 (Standard 5) upwards.

Student leaders at the University of the Western Cape (UWC) and the University of Cape Town (UCT) organised marches. Poster parades by UWC and Black Power Salute marches by UCT was broken by the police, resulting in 73 students getting arrested and detained at Victor Verster Prison, near Paarl.

On 1 September 1976, the unrest spread to the city of Cape Town itself. Approximately 2000 black students from Western Cape townships, namely Langa, Nyanga and Gugulethu, matched the Cape Town central business district (CBD). Coloured students also contributed to the protests by peacefully marching to the city, but were blockaded by the police in the CBD. The protests turned violent when coloured students started burning schools, libraries and a magistrate's court in support of the student revolt. Thereafter, 200,000 coloured workers partook in a two-day strike staying away from work in the Cape Town area.

According to a report by the Truth and Reconciliation Commission (TRC), the Western Cape experienced the second highest number of deaths and casualties associated with the 1976 uprising protests.

==== 1994 and the Western Cape post-apartheid ====
In 1994, at the introduction of the Interim Constitution and the first non-racial election, South Africa's original provinces and bantustans were abolished and nine new provinces were established. The former Cape Province was divided into the Western Cape, Northern Cape, Eastern Cape and part of North West.

In the 1994 election, the Western Cape was one of two provinces that did not elect an African National Congress (ANC) provincial government (the other being KwaZulu-Natal). The National Party (NP) won 53% of the votes and 23 seats in the 42-seat provincial legislature, and Hernus Kriel, a former Minister of Law and Order, was elected Premier. He resigned in 1998 and was replaced by Gerald Morkel.

The 1999 election marked the beginning of a period of great turbulence in Western Cape politics. No party achieved an absolute majority in the provincial parliament, as the ANC won 18 seats while the New National Party (NNP), successor to the NP, won 17. The NNP went into coalition with the Democratic Party (DP), which won 5 seats, to form a government, and Morkel remained Premier. In 2000 the DP and the NNP formalised their coalition by forming the Democratic Alliance (DA).

In 2001, however, the NNP broke with the DA over the removal of Peter Marais from office as Mayor of Cape Town by DA leader Tony Leon. The NNP instead went into coalition with the ANC; Gerald Morkel, who was opposed to the split, resigned as Premier and was replaced by Peter Marais. In 2002 Marais resigned as Premier due to a sexual harassment scandal, and was replaced by NNP leader Marthinus van Schalkwyk.

During the 2003 floor-crossing period four members of the provincial parliament crossed to the ANC, giving it an absolute majority of 22 seats in the 42-seat house. However, the ANC remained in coalition with the NNP and van Schalkwyk remained as Premier.

In the 2004 election, there was again no absolute winner in the provincial parliament; this time the ANC won 19 seats, the DA won 12, and the NNP won 5. The ANC-NNP coalition continued in power, but van Schalkwyk took up a ministerial post in the national cabinet and was replaced as Premier by the ANC's Ebrahim Rasool.

The NNP was finally dissolved after the 2005 floor-crossing period and its members joined the ANC, again giving that party an absolute majority of 24 seats. In the 2007 floor-crossing period the ANC gained a further three members of the provincial parliament. In 2008 Rasool resigned as Premier due to internal party politics, and was replaced by Lynne Brown.

The 2009 election marked a significant change in Western Cape politics, as the Democratic Alliance won 51% of the votes and an absolute majority of 22 seats in the provincial parliament, while the ANC won 14 seats with 31% of the vote. The DA leader Helen Zille was elected Premier. In 2010 the Independent Democrats, which had won 3 seats with 5% of the vote, merged with the DA.

In the 2014 election the DA won 59% of the votes and an absolute majority of 26 seats in the provincial parliament, while the ANC won 14 seats with 32% of the vote. In 2018 King Khoebaha Cornelius III Declared the independence of the "Sovereign State of Good Hope".

In the 2019 election, the DA retained their majority in the province, but with a reduction in support. It had won 24 seats with 55%. Helen Zille was term-limited and the DA premier candidate Alan Winde succeeded her. The ANC also lost support. It had received 12 seats with 28% support, its lowest showing since 1994. Veteran politician Peter Marais returned to the provincial parliament as the sole representative of the Freedom Front Plus. Patricia de Lille formed another party, Good, and it achieved a seat.

The DA continued to win a majority of the votes in the 2021 municipal elections, receiving 54% of the vote province-wide, with support in Cape Town at 58%.

=== Cape Independence Movement ===
Since the late 2000s there have been calls for Western Cape, or Greater Cape, independence from South Africa. Political parties such as the Referendum Party, Freedom Front Plus and organisations such as the Cape Independence Advocacy Group and CapeXit, wish to bring forth the constitutional and peaceful secession of the Western Cape.

Proponents claim substantial support for the idea, with CapeXit having over 800,000 signed mandates in May 2021. Additionally, a poll conducted in 2023 by Victory Research on behalf of the Cape Independence Advocacy Group claimed that 58% of the Western Cape's registered voters would support independence, while 68% would support a referendum on the issue.

== Law and government ==
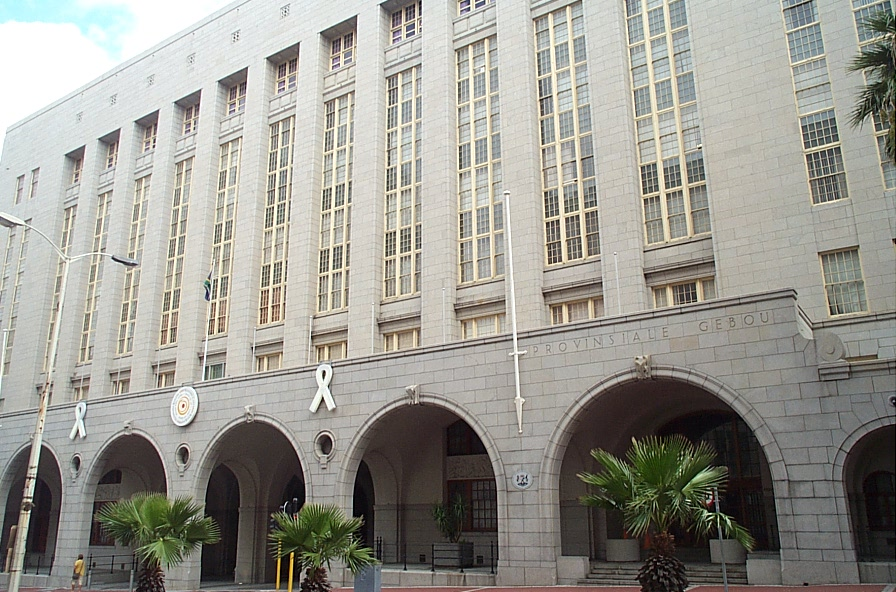
Provincial government headquarters in Cape Town

The provincial government is established under the Constitution of the Western Cape, which was adopted in 1998. The people of the province elect the 42-member Western Cape Provincial Parliament every five years by a system of party-list proportional representation. The sixth provincial parliament was elected in 2024; 24 seats are held by the Democratic Alliance, 8 by the African National Congress, 3 by the Patriotic Alliance, 2 by the Economic Freedom Fighters, and 1 each by the African Christian Democratic Party, Al Jama-ah, Good, Freedom Front Plus, and National Coloured Congress.

The provincial parliament is responsible for legislating within its responsibilities as set out by the national constitution; these responsibilities include agriculture, education, environment, health services, housing, language policies, tourism, trade, and welfare.

The provincial parliament also elects the Premier of the Western Cape to lead the provincial executive. Alan Winde, a member of the DA and former Provincial Minister of Community Safety, has served as Premier since the 2019 provincial election.

The Premier appoints ten members of the provincial legislature to serve as a cabinet of ministers, overseeing the departments of the provincial government. These departments are Agriculture, Community Safety, Cultural Affairs and Sport, Economic Development and Tourism, Education, Environmental Affairs and Development Planning, Health, Human Settlements, Local Government, Social Development, Transport and Public Works, and the Provincial Treasury.

Politically, the Western Cape is a stronghold for the Democratic Alliance (DA). The DA has won an absolute majority of the vote in the province in every national, provincial, and municipal election since 2009.

=== International relations ===
Western Cape maintains several sister/twin relations with counterpart regional governments in other countries:

- California, United States
- Shandong, China
- Busan, South Korea

== Municipalities ==
The Western Cape Province is divided into one metropolitan municipality and five district municipalities. The district municipalities are in turn divided into 24 local municipalities.

In the following interactive map, the district and metropolitan municipalities are labelled in capital letters and shaded in various different colours. Clicking on the district on the map loads the appropriate article:

Western Cape districts and local municipalities. Clicking on the district on the map loads the appropriate article.

=== Local, district and metropolitan municipalities ===
Code	Municipality	Seat	Population (2022)	Area (km^{2})	Pop. density (per km^{2})	Mayor	Mayor Party
CPT	City of Cape Town; Metropolitan Municipality	Cape Town	4,772,846	2,446	1,951.3	Geordin Hill-Lewis	DA
DC1	West Coast; District Municipality	Moorreesburg	497,394	31,119	16.0	Roelof Strydom	DA
WC011	Matzikama LM	Vredendal	69,043	12,981	5.3	Johan Van Der Hoven	DA
WC012	Cederberg LM	Clanwilliam	55,108	8,007	6.9	Ruben Richards	CFRA
WC013	Bergrivier LM	Piketberg	70,276	4,407	15.9	Ray van Rooy	DA
WC014	Saldanha Bay LM	Vredenburg	154,635	2,015	76.7	Andre Truter	DA
WC015	Swartland LM	Malmesbury	148,331	3,707	40.0	Harold Cleophas	DA
DC2	Cape Winelands; District Municipality	Worcester	862,703	21,473	40.2	Helena von Schlicht	DA
WC022	Witzenberg LM	Ceres	103,765	10,753	9.6	Trevor Abrahams	DA
WC023	Drakenstein LM	Paarl	276,800	1,538	180.0	Stephen Korabie	DA
WC024	Stellenbosch LM	Stellenbosch	175,411	831	211.1	Gesie van Deventer	DA
WC025	Breede Valley LM	Worcester	212,682	3,834	55.5	Antoinette Steyn	DA
WC026	Langeberg LM	Ashton	94,045	4,518	20.8	SW van Eede	DA
DC3	Overberg; District Municipality	Bredasdorp	359,446	12,239	29.4	Andries Franken	DA
WC031	Theewaterskloof LM	Caledon	139,563	3,259	42.8	Kallie Papier	PA
WC032	Overstrand LM	Hermanus	132,495	1,675	79.1	Annelie Rabie	DA
WC033	Cape Agulhas LM	Bredasdorp	40,274	3,471	11.6	Raymond Ross	DA
WC034	Swellendam LM	Swellendam	47,114	3,835	12.3	Francois du Rand	DA
DC4	Garden Route; District Municipality	George	838,457	23,331	35.9	Andrew Stroebel	DA
WC041	Kannaland LM	Ladismith	31,986	4,765	6.7	Jeffrey Donson	ICOSA
WC042	Hessequa LM	Riversdale	71,918	5,733	12.5	Grant Riddles	DA
WC043	Mossel Bay LM	Mossel Bay	140,075	2,001	70.0	Dirk Kotzé	DA
WC044	George LM	George	294,929	5,191	56.8	Jackie von Brandis	DA
WC045	Oudtshoorn LM	Oudtshoorn	138,257	3,540	39.1	Johannes Allers	FF+
WC047	Bitou LM	Plettenberg Bay	65,240	992	65.8	Claude Terblanche	PDC
WC048	Knysna LM	Knysna	96,055	1,109	86.6	Aubrey Tsengwa	ANC
DC5	Central Karoo; District Municipality	Beaufort West	102,173	38,854	2.6	J. Botha	ANC
WC051	Laingsburg LM	Laingsburg	11,366	8,784	1.3	Mitchell Smith	PA
WC052	Prince Albert LM	Prince Albert	17,836	8,153	2.2	Linda Jaquet	DA
WC053	Beaufort West LM	Beaufort West	72,972	21,917	3.3	Josias De Kock Reynolds	DA

== Housing ==
The Western Cape is one of South Africa's most desirable provinces in which to live, with many high net worth individuals moving to the province from elsewhere in the country in recent years (often referred to as "semigration"). The province is also popular amongst those immigrating to South Africa.

Cape Town, the province's capital, has South Africa's most-desirable and most robust real estate market. In 2021, the city's property market was valued at R1.22 trillion, constituting 72% of the entire Western Cape residential property market value, and 21% of the national property market value.

The Western Cape's average house price in 2024 was R2.33 million, which was well above the national average. Property market strength is also high, with property value growth at 8.7% year-on-year in January 2025, which was also significantly above the national average.

=== Affordable housing ===
Numerous affordable housing projects have been established in the City of Cape Town, with the development of more underway. As of 2025, a total of 10 social housing estates have been built across Cape Town, with 3 of them located within 10 kilometers of Cape Town CBD.

In July 2025, Western Cape MEC for Infrastructure, Tertuis Simmers, and Western Cape Premier, Alan Winde, unveiled Cape Town CBD's largest ever government housing development project, called Founders Garden. Located next to the Artscape Theatre, the project will feature a high-rise, mixed-use development, and has a projected value of more than R2 billion.

In September 2025, the Western Cape Infrastructure Department announced that it had identified over 1,800 hectares of land for affordable housing development in the province. This includes 303 hectares of provincial government-owned land, and over 1,500 hectares of national government-owned land. The department stated that it was committed to addressing the housing backlog, but that doing so required the national government to release land.

== Economy ==
As of 2023, the Western Cape has the highest Human Development Index (HDI) in South Africa

In 2024, the Western Cape's total real GDP increased to R666.75 billion. That equated to 14.2% of South Africa's total GDP, and a real GDP per capita of R87,859. The Western Cape has the third-largest economy of South Africa's nine provinces, behind Gauteng and KwaZulu-Natal.

The Western Cape has had the strongest-performing provincial economy in South Africa for a decade, with an average annual growth rate of around 0.87% - well above the national average. Purchasing power is also strong in the Western Cape, GDP per capita in the province is significantly higher than the national average.

As of 2023, the Western Cape's Human Development Index (HDI) is the highest in South Africa at 0.778, and has had SA's highest HDI for almost three decades. This is as compared to the 2023 South African average of 0.741.

As of 2023, the biggest sector in the Western Cape's economy is the financial, business services and real estate sector, which constitutes 33.55% of gross value added, followed by manufacturing at 14.26% and wholesale and retail trade, hotels, and restaurants at 13.67%.

Cape Town, the province's capital, also has a thriving tech sector (especially fintech). The city is home to numerous tech headquarters, including those of Yoco, Admyt, Xneelo, Jumo, Luno, Rain, and Aerobotics.

The city also has a major retail sector, with the headquarters of 9 of South Africa's major retail companies, including most of its largest supermarket chains, such as Woolworths, Pick n Pay, Clicks, Shoprite, Foschini Group, and Pepkor. The headquarters of South Africa's largest e-commerce retailer, Takealot Group, is also located in Cape Town.

Customer service, fashion design, and advertising are industries rapidly gaining in importance in the Western Cape.

Cape Town is home to a large film industry, with numerous international productions choosing to film on location in the city each year. A significant portion of the industry is based out of the Cape Town Film Studios.

As of 2023, Cape Town accounts for a large majority (roughly 73%) of the Western Cape's GDP.

Tourism in the Western Cape is promoted and reported on by Wesgro, the province's official tourism, trade, and investment promotion agency.

95% of wine produced in South Africa is produced in the Western Cape. South Africa is the 7th largest wine producing region in the world.

The province's unemployment rate in Q2 2026 was 19.5% – the lowest in South Africa by a significant margin, and considerably below the national unemployment rate of 33.6%.

The Western Cape Government, via its Growth for Jobs strategy, aims to grow the Western Cape into a R1 trillion economy by 2035, and to increase private sector investment to a total of 20% of the province's GDP.

== Transport ==
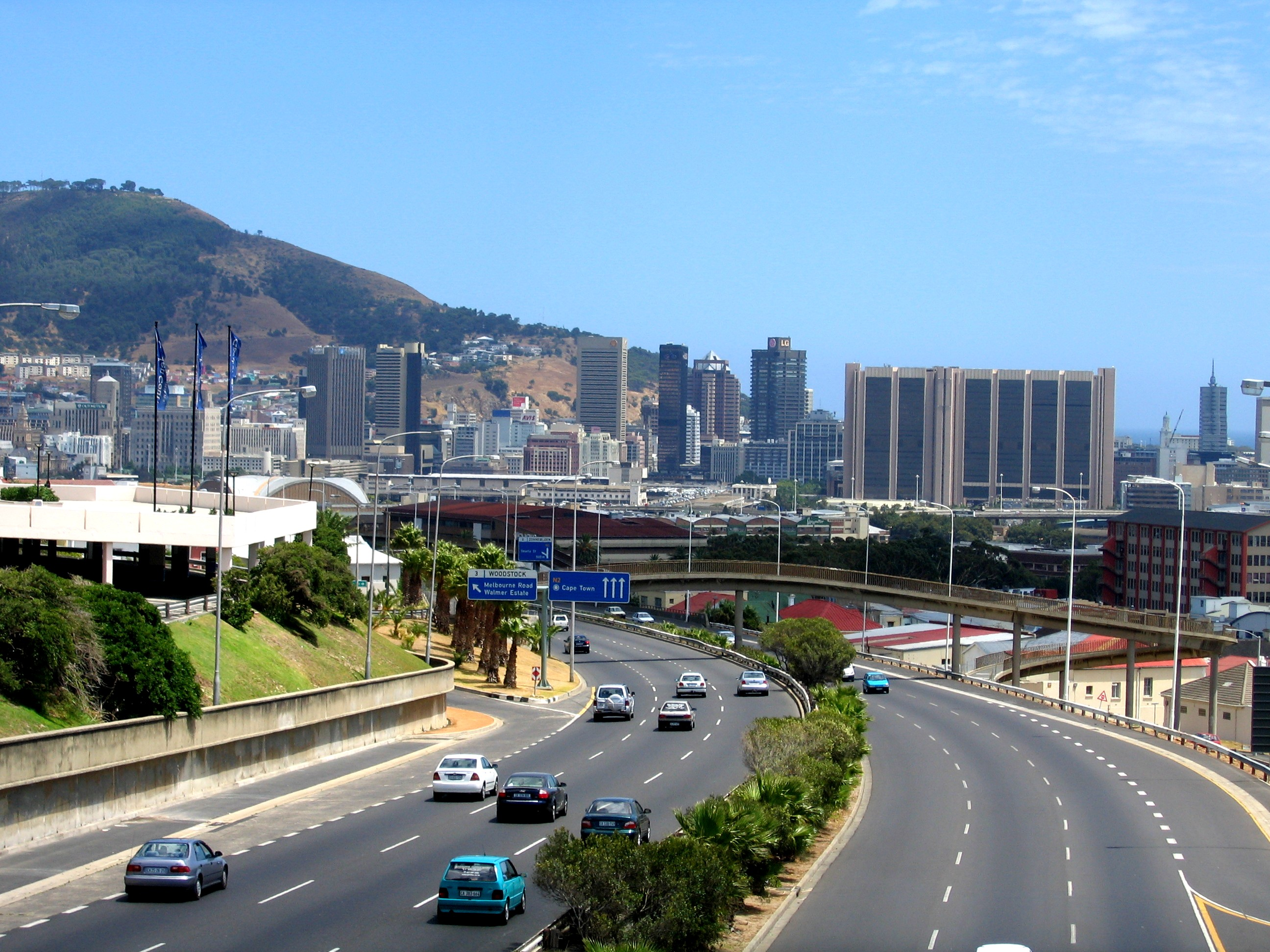
The N2 as it enters the City Bowl of Cape Town.

Railway network in the Western Cape

The Western Cape has an excellent network of highways comparable with any first-world country. The primary highways are the N1 (from Cape Town to Three Sisters, continuing outside the province towards Bloemfontein and Johannesburg), N2 (from Cape Town to Bloukrans River, towards Port Elizabeth), N7 (from Cape Town to Bitterfontein, continuing towards Springbok and Namibia), N9 (from George to Uniondale, continuing towards Graaff-Reinet and Colesberg) and N12 (from George to Three Sisters, continuing towards Kimberley and Johannesburg).

Other routes are the "R" roads which connect the smaller towns. All major roads are tarred with major rural gravel roads well maintained. Limited access motorways are limited to the Cape Metropolitan Area, Winelands and Garden Route, however due to the low population density of the remainder of the province, the highways remain efficient and high-speed, except during peak holiday travel seasons, when travel can be slow-going in places due to heavy traffic.

== Demographics ==
Population density in the Western Cape
- <1 /km^{2}
- 1–3 /km^{2}
- 3–10 /km^{2}
- 10–30 /km^{2}
- 30–100 /km^{2}
- 100–300 /km^{2}
- 300–1000 /km^{2}
- 1000–3000 /km^{2}
- >3000 /km^{2}

Dominant home languages in the Western Cape
- Afrikaans
- English
- Xhosa
- No language dominant

The 2022 South African census recorded the population of the Western Cape as 7,433,020 people living in 2,264,032 households. As the province covers an area of 129,462 square kilometres (49,986 sq mi), the population density was 45.0 inhabitants per square kilometre (117/sq mi) and the household density 12.6 per square kilometre (33/sq mi).

Racial groups of the Western Cape (2022 census)
1. Coloured (42.1%)
2. Black (38.8%)
3. White (16.4%)
4. Indian (1.14%)
5. Other (1.55%)

The age distribution of the province was as follows: 25.1% were under the age of 15, 18.3% from 15 to 24, 32.7% from 25 to 44, 18.0% from 45 to 64, and 5.9% who are 65 years of age or older. The median age is 28 years. For every 100 women there are 96 men.

In the 2022 Census, 42% of the people of the Western Cape described themselves as "Coloured", while 39% described themselves as "Black African", 16% as "White", and 1% as "Indian or Asian". Afrikaans is the first language of 41% of the province's population, IsiXhosa of 31%, and English of 22%.

There were 260,952 people in the province who had been born outside of South Africa, comprising 4% of the population. In 2011, 894,289 residents of the Western Cape had been born in the Eastern Cape (16% of the population), 167,524 in Gauteng (3%) and 61,945 (1%) in KwaZulu-Natal.

Between 2001 and 2007 the Western Cape received the second-most internal migration within South Africa after Gauteng, with a large majority of these new Western Cape residents coming from the former Transkei region of the Eastern Cape, which served as the historic native reserve of the Cape Colony and the political banishment site for native "troublemakers".

=== Economic status ===
The average annual household income was R143,460, the second-highest in the country after Gauteng. As of September 2012, 69% of the population aged 15–64 are economically active, and of these 25% are unemployed. Overall, 52% of the working-age population are employed.

Around 2 million people in the Western Cape labour market (those aged 16 to 64) are employed, 1.3 million are not economically active, 552,733 are unemployed with an additional 122,753 who are discouraged work seekers who want to work but have given up looking for it.

According to the 2011 Census 90% of households in the province have a flush toilet and 90% have refuse removed by the local council at least once a week. 75% of households have piped tap water inside the dwelling, while a further 13% have piped water on their property; 11% receive piped water at a community tap, while 1% have no access to piped water. One in seven people live in an informal dwelling. Additionally, 86.9% of households use electricity for cooking, and 93% use it for lighting. 89% of households have a cellphone and 31% have a landline telephone, while 86% own a television, 81% own a refrigerator, and 34% own a computer. 44% of households have access to the Internet.

Towns and main roads in the Western Cape

=== Education ===
2.7% of residents aged 20 and over have received no schooling, 10.7% have had only some primary, 5.6% have completed primary school but gone no further, 38% have had some secondary education without finishing Grade 12, 28% have finished Grade 12 but gone no further, and 14% have higher education beyond the secondary level. Overall, 43% of residents have completed high school.

=== Religion ===
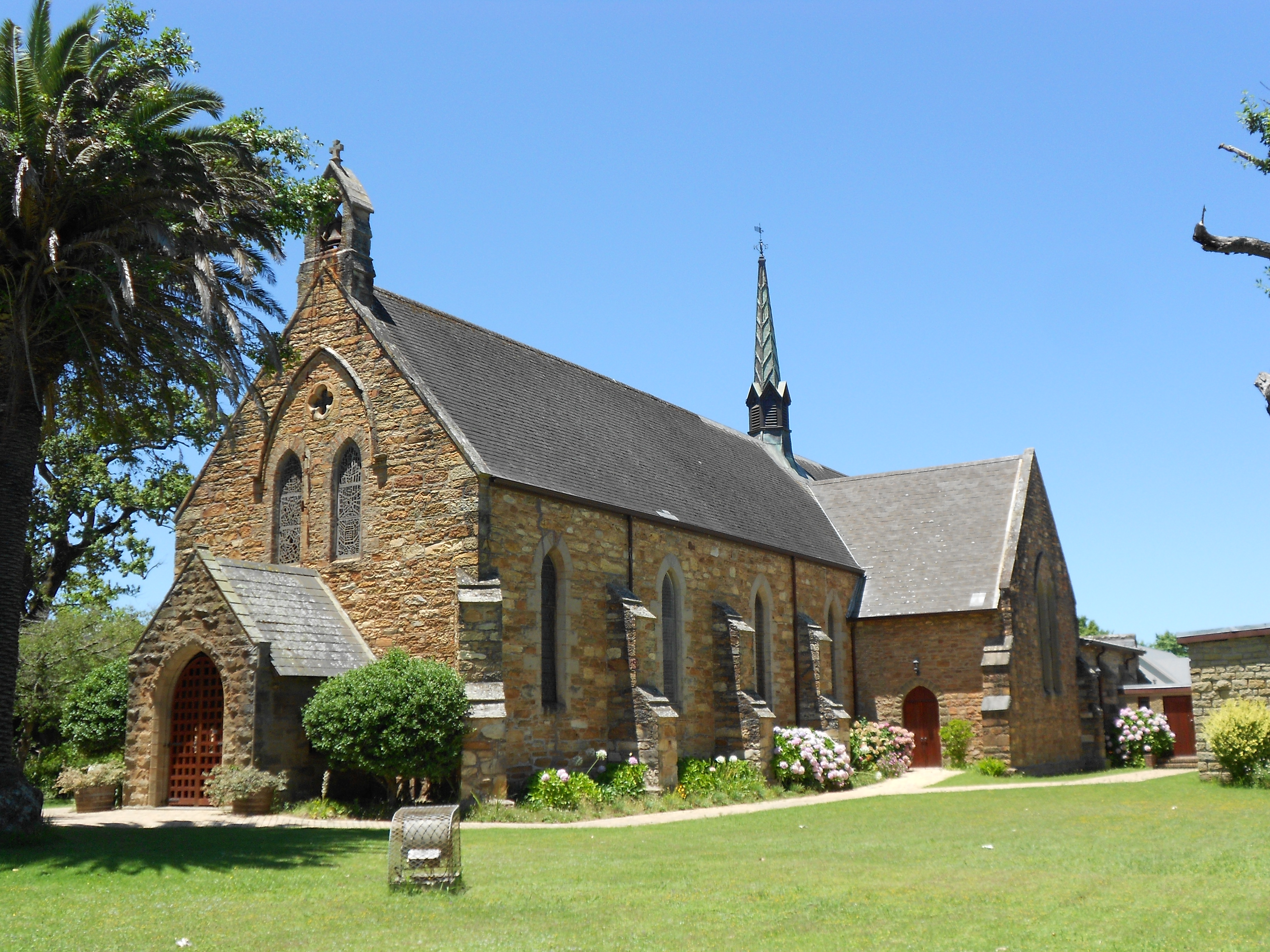
The Cathedral of St Mark in George.

According to the 2022 census, a majority of the population of the Western Cape is Christian. At 5.2% of the population, the Western Cape's Muslim minority is the largest among South Africa's provinces.

Religious Affiliation (2022)
Christianity	85.6%
Traditional African	5.3%
Islam	5.2%
Judaism	0.2%
Hinduism	0.2%
Buddhism	0.1%
Atheism	0.3%
Agnosticism	0.3%
No religious affiliation	2.0%
Other	0.8%

=== Cities and towns ===
Largest cities or towns in the Western Cape National Census 2011
Rank		Municipality	Pop.	Rank		Municipality	Pop.
1	Cape Town	City of Cape Town	4,005,016	11	Beaufort West	Beaufort West Local Municipality	34,085
2	Paarl (including Wellington)	Drakenstein Local Municipality	179,319	12	Ceres	Witzenberg Local Municipality	33,224
3	George	George Local Municipality	157,394	13	Plettenberg Bay	Bitou Local Municipality	31,804
4	Worcester	Breede Valley Local Municipality	127,597	14	Grabouw	Theewaterskloof Local Municipality	30,337
5	Knysna	Knysna Local Municipality	76,150	15	Saldanha	Saldanha Bay Local Municipality	28,142
6	Atlantis	City of Cape Town	67,491	16	Stellenbosch	Stellenbosch Local Municipality	21,799
7	Oudtshoorn	Oudtshoorn Local Municipality	61,507	17	Vredendal	Matzikama Local Municipality	18,170
8	Mossel Bay	Mossel Bay Local Municipality	59,031	18	Gordon's Bay	City of Cape Town	16,776
9	Vredenburg	Saldanha Bay Local Municipality	38,382	19	Riversdale	Hessequa Local Municipality	16,176
10	Malmesbury	Swartland Local Municipality	35,897	20	Montagu	Langeberg Local Municipality	15,176

== Education ==
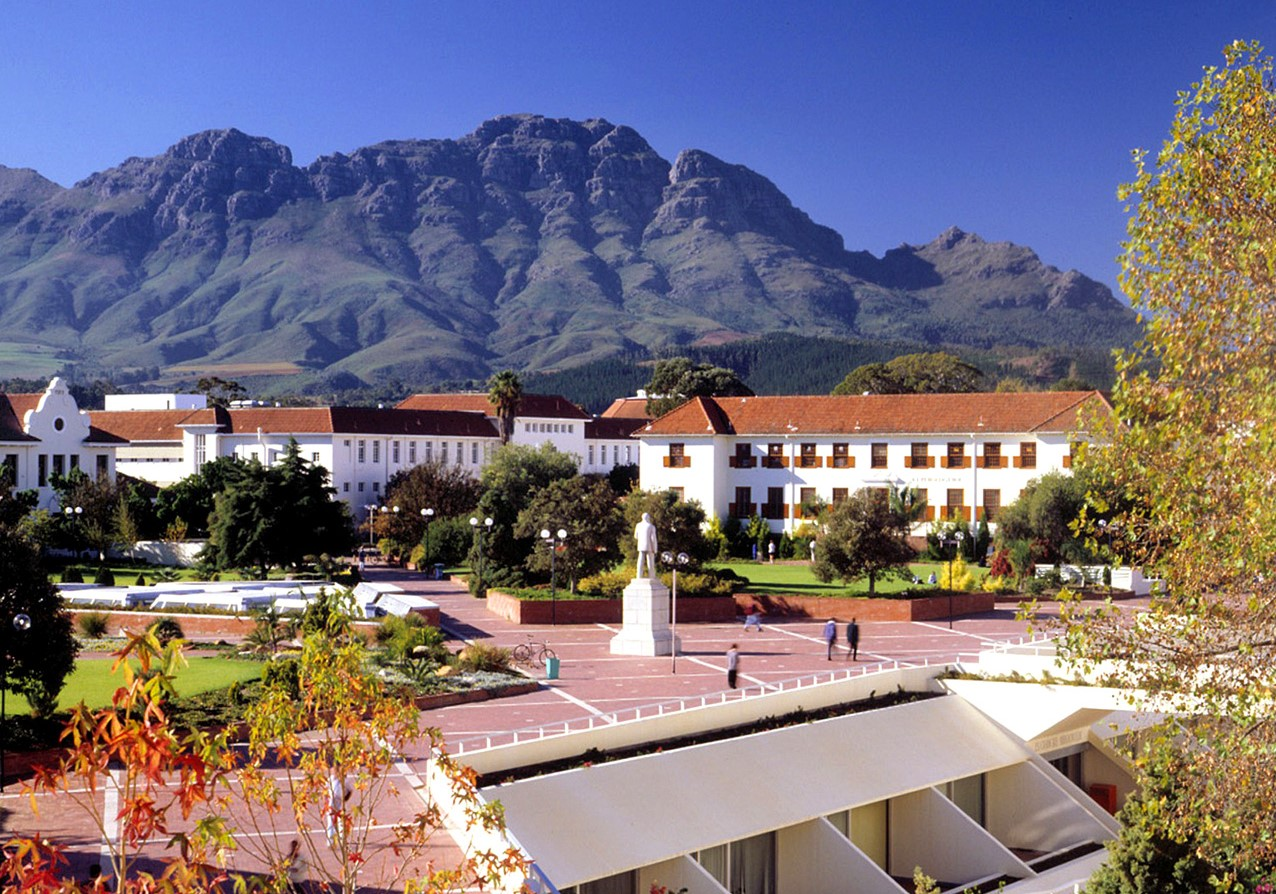
Stellenbosch University

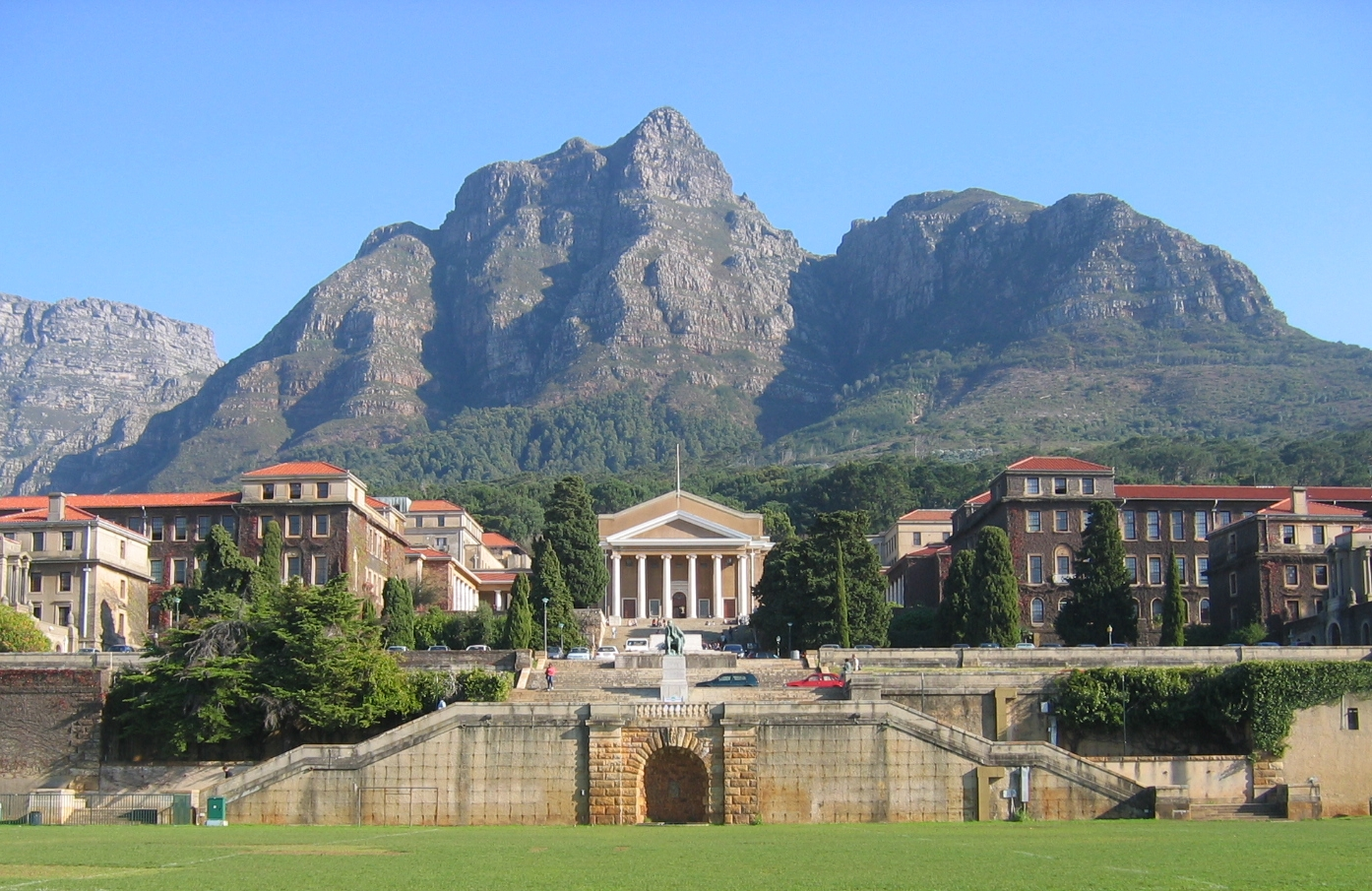
The University of Cape Town

The Western Cape province has the most highly educated residents with a very skilled workforce in comparison to any other African region. The high school graduation rate is consistently around 80%, higher than any other province. The proportion of adults with a degree or higher was 4.8% (2005), the highest in the country.

The province also boasts four universities:

- Cape Peninsula University of Technology
- Stellenbosch University
- University of Cape Town
- University of the Western Cape

The province is also home to the South African Military Academy.

== Culture ==
=== Cuisine ===
Types of cuisine originating from the Western Cape include Dutch and Malay cuisines. Other types of South African cuisine are also found and commonly enjoyed in the province. Over 50% of all cheese in South Africa is produced in the Western Cape. Four of the top ten entries in Trip Advisor's Best Fine Dining Restaurants – Africa list for 2021 are in the Western Cape.

=== Winelands ===
The Western Cape is known for its wine production and vineyards. The winelands are divided into six main regions: Boberg, Breede River Valley, Cape South Coast, Coastal Region, Klein Karoo and Olifants River. Each has unique climate, topography and fertile soil. Distilled wine or brandy is produced in the Cape Winelands, Overberg, and Garden Route districts of the province. Brandy from these regions is regarded as amongst the best in the world due to the high, legally-enforced distilling standards in the region, technically making it equivalent to Cognac.

== See also ==
- Cape Colony
- Cape independence
- Cape Qualified Franchise
- List of Western Cape Municipalities by Human Development Index
