= Parachute Association of South Africa =

PASA logo

The Parachute Association of South Africa (PASA) manages the sports of parachuting and skydiving in South Africa on behalf of the South African Civil Aviation Authority.

== Mission statement ==
To foster, develop and facilitate sport parachuting, in all its facets, within South Africa, in the safest and most progressive manner, on behalf of its members.

== Organisation ==
The structure of PASA consists of a Management Council and two subsidiary associations, namely the Association of Drop Zone Operators (ADZO) and the Sport Skydivers Association (SSA).

All affiliated Drop Zone Operations have a seat on the ADZO board. The duties and responsibilities of ADZO include, inter alia:

- To ensure the safe conduct of all parachuting activities at all affiliated Drop Zones.
- To ensure that all instruction performed by affiliated DZ Operations by way of first jump courses, using static-line, AFF or tandem methods, and the progression thereafter, conforms with internationally accepted safety standards and norms.
- To train and develop staff with the necessary skills and knowledge required to implement the safety standards and progression.
- To maintain the uniformity of minimum safety standards amongst all the affiliated DZ operations. To ensure that the Manual of *Procedures (MOPs) remains current and complies with the latest operating procedures. To abide by the constitution.
- To facilitate communication amongst its members and with the authorities in regard to safety issues and developments.

The Sport Skydivers Association consists of committees for each one of the FAI recognised disciplines, and for Wing Suiting, a Judges Committee and three Non-Executive Directors. These committees are tasked with organising and promoting their respective disciplines within South Africa by:

- Organising and holding regional and national championships.
- Selection and support of National teams/representatives to represent South Africa at International Championships.
- Organising and holding seminars and training camps to improve the standards of participation within each discipline, whether at a junior, intermediate or senior level, both locally and abroad.
- Keeping up to date with, and disseminating to all members, information relating to new techniques and practices which may improve standards of performance within each respective discipline.

== Affiliated Clubs ==
- Aerial FX - Show Jump Operation
- Durban Skydive Centre - Student Operation
- EP Skydivers (Grahamstown) - Student Operation
- Icarus Skydiving - Show Jump Operation
- Johannesburg Skydiving Club - Student Operation. The facility offers tandem skydiving, static line and Accelerated Freefall (AFF) student training. It is one of the oldest in the country.
- Mother City SkyDiving - Cape Town - Non-Student Operation - operating out of Diepkloof Airfield 70km from Cape Town and 12km north of Malmesbury in the Western Cape offers sports skydiving for experienced skydivers and tandem skydiving for first time jumpers.
- Pretoria Military Parachute Club - Student Operation
- Pretoria Skydiving Club - Student Operation
- Skydive Ballito - Non-Student Operation
- Skydive Cape Town - Non-Student Operation
- Skydive Central (Bloemfontein) - Student Operation
- Skydive Mossel Bay - Student Operation
- Skydive on the Vaal - Student Operation
- Skydive Oudtshoorn - Student Operation
- Skydive Parys - Student Operation
- Skydive Plettenberg Bay - Student Operation
- Skydive Port Elizabeth - Student Operation
- Skydive Robertson (Western Province Sport Parachute Club) - Student Operation - operating out of Robertson Airfield in the Western Cape town of Robertson at the heart of South Africa's wine route Route 62 (South Africa) - 147km from Cape Town. The club provides a facility for all skydiving disciplines for sports skydivers of all levels of experience and facilitates tandem skydiving, static line and Accelerated Freefall (AFF) student training. The club celebrates is 40th year of operations in 2012.
- SkyDive Rustenburg - Student Operation - operating out of Rustenburg Airfield is frequented by sports skydivers of all skydiving disciplines as well as a popular skydive training facility that offers tandem skydiving, Accelerated Freefall (AFF) and static line courses.
- Skydive The Beach (Margate) - Non-Student Operation
- Witbank Skydiving Club - Student Operation

== See also ==
- Parachuting
- United States Parachute Association
- South African Civil Aviation Authority
