= Robertson Airfield =

- IATA: ROD; ICAO: FARS

Summary
- Airport type: Public
- Owner: Langeberg Municipality
- Operator: Robertson Flying Club
- Serves: Robertson; Ashton; Montagu; Bonnievale; McGregor
- Location: Robertson, Western Cape, South Africa
- Elevation AMSL: 640 ft / 195 m
- Coordinates: 33°48′42.39″S 19°54′13.31″E
- Interactive map of Robertson Airfield

Runways
| Direction | Length | | Surface |
| Direction | m | ft | Surface |
|---|---|---|---|
| 10 / 28 | 1,600 | 5,249 | Asphalt |
| 14 / 32 | 720 | 2,362 | Grass (caution required – uneven) |

Robertson Airfield (IATA: ROD, ICAO: FARS), licensed according to South African Civil Aviation Authority standards, is an unmanned municipal airport situated 1 km to the east of the Western Cape town of Robertson in South Africa. It is on Route 62.

== See also ==
- Skydive Robertson
