= R60 (South Africa) =

Provincial route in South Africa

Provincial route R60

Route information
- Maintained by WCDTPW
- Length: 112 km (70 mi)

Major junctions
- Northwest end: N1 near Worcester
- R43 in Worcester; R62 near Ashton
- Southeast end: N2 near Swellendam

Location
- Country: South Africa
- Major cities: Worcester, Robertson, Ashton, Swellendam

Highway system
- Numbered routes of South Africa
← R59	→ R61

The R60 is a provincial route in Western Cape, South Africa that runs along the Breede River Valley, connecting Worcester with Swellendam via Robertson. It also provides a link between the N1 and the N2 national roads.

Detailed Route

== Route ==
The R60 begins in the north-eastern part of Worcester at a junction with the N1 national route. It begins by heading southwards as High Street to reach a junction in Worcester Central, where it becomes Robertson Road towards the south-east. It heads south-east for 47 kilometres, bypassing Zweletemba, following the Breede River and the Langeberg mountain range, to pass through the town of Robertson and meet the northern terminus of the R317 route next to the Robertson Airfield.

From Robertson, the R60 heads eastwards for 17 kilometres to pass through the town of Ashton and meet the western terminus of the R62 road (Cogmanskloof Pass), where the R60 turns to the south-east. It continues following the Breede River and the Langeberg mountain range south-east for 45 kilometres, bypassing Zolani, to reach its end at a junction with the N2 national route south-west of the town centre of Swellendam.
