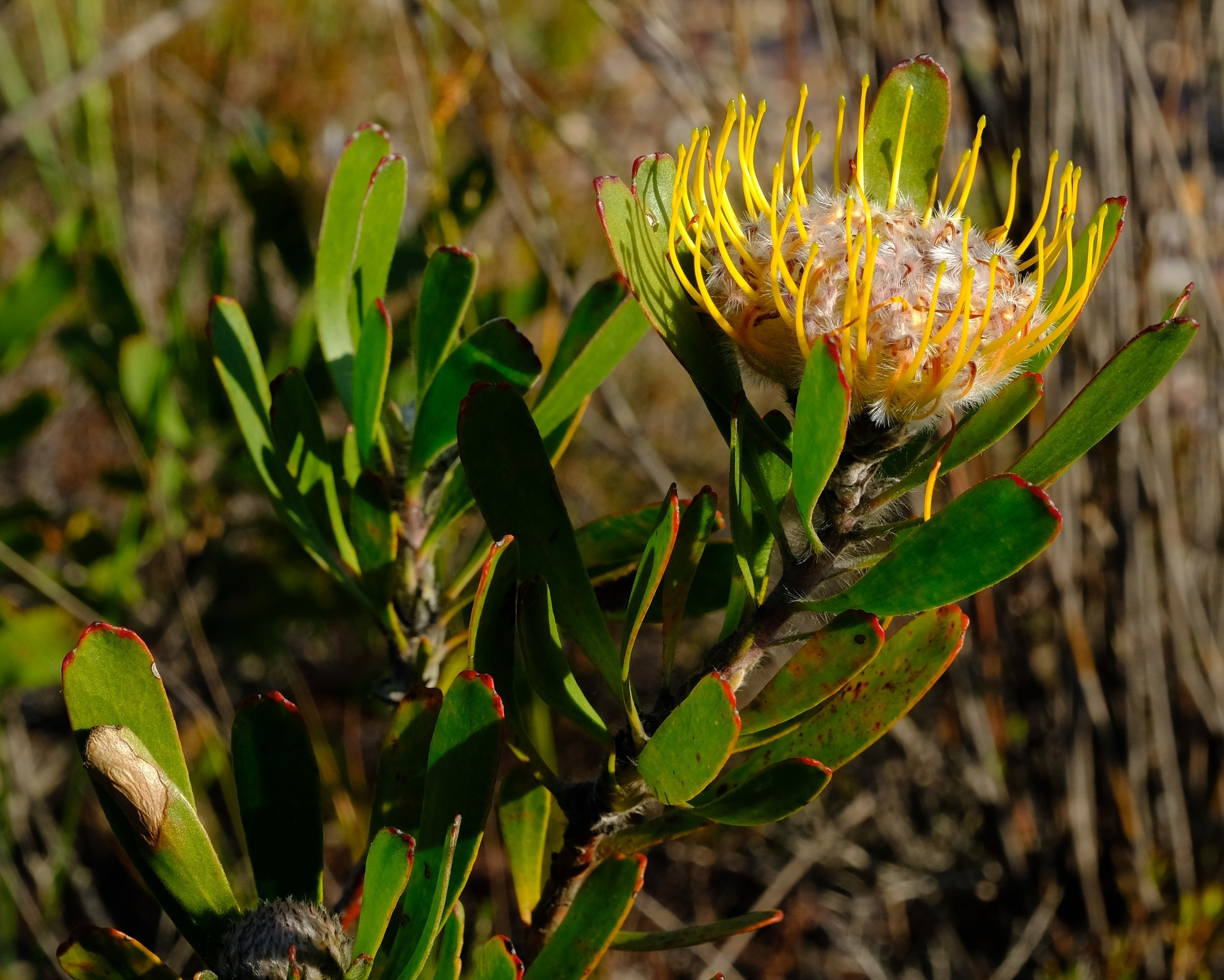

Conservation status
- Least Concern (IUCN 3.1)

Scientific classification
- Kingdom: Plantae
- Clade: Embryophytes
- Clade: Tracheophytes
- Clade: Spermatophytes
- Clade: Angiosperms
- Clade: Eudicots
- Order: Proteales
- Family: Proteaceae
- Genus: Leucospermum
- Species: L. utriculosum

Binomial name
- Leucospermum utriculosum Rourke, 1970

= Leucospermum utriculosum =

Species of shrub

Leucospermum utriculosum is a lax, evergreen, upright and arching shrub of 1–2 m (3–6½ ft) high, from the family Proteaceae. It has hairless inverted lance-shaped to oblong leaves tipped with three to five teeth and globe-shaped to flattened light yellow to coppery flowerheads of 5–8 cm (2.0–3.2 in) in diameter. From the center of the flowers emerge almost straight styles that jointly give the impression of a pincushion. It is called Breede River pincushion in English. Although flower heads may occur on and off between May and March, the peak season is from September to November. It is known from the Western Cape province of South Africa.

== Description ==
Leucospermum utriculosum is an upright or spreading shrub of 1–2 m (3–6½ ft) high and 2–3 m (6½–10 ft) across, with an informal habit. Its branches grow out at an angle up to the horizontal and often droop to the ground. It grows from a stout single main stem that branches low down, and is covered in a smooth, grey bark. The flowering stems are about 3½ mm (0.14 in) thick, and covered in fine crisped hairs and long, straight, silky hairs. The hairless leaves are inverted lance-shaped with a wedge-shaped base narrowing to a stalk, the tip cut-off, with three to five stout teeth of 4½–7 cm (1.8–2.8 in) long and 1–2 cm (0.4–0.8 in) wide.

The more or less flattened globe-shaped flowerheads of 5–8 cm (2.0–3.2 in) in diameter have a stalk of about 1 cm (0.4 in) long, are usual set individually but sometimes grouped in twos or threes. The common base of the flowers in the same head is broadly cone-shaped, about 1 cm (0.4 in) long and approximately ¾ cm across. The bracts that subtend each flower head are greyish because they are covered with densely matted silky hairs, tightly overlapping and pressed against the flower head, oval with a pointy tip, about 8 mm (0.3 in) long and 5 mm (0.2 in) wide, and cartilaginous in consistency.

The bract that subtends each flower individually encloses the perianth at its base, has an extended pointed tip (cuspidate), about 1 cm (0.4 in) long and ½ cm (0.2 in) wide, very densely set with woolly hairs at the base and silky hairy near the tip. As in all Proteaceae, the perianth is 4-merous, and either pale yellow (in the south) or orange to copper-coloured (in the north of its distribution). The lowest, fully merged, part of the perianth, called tube, is about 7 mm (0.28 in) long, at 1 mm (0.04 in) narrow and hairless at its base, but greatly expanded to about 4 mm (0.16 in) wide and powdery hairy higher up, to become suddenly constricted where it merges into the middle part. The middle part (or claws), where the perianth is split lengthwise, is about 2 mm (0.08 in) long and covered in spreading to erect, silky hairs. The upper part (or limbs), which enclosed the pollen presenter in the bud consists of four elliptic lobes of about 2 mm (0.079 in) long, which are covered in straight, white to rust-coloured silky hairs. The elliptic anthers are directly fused to the limbs. From the perianth emerges a style of 3½–5 cm (1.4–2.0 in) long, bent slightly in upper third in the direction of the centre of the head. The thickened part at the tip of the style called pollen presenter is narrowly cone- to egg-shaped and 1½–2 mm (0.06–0.08 in) long, greenish (in the south) and crimson (in the north of its distribution), with a groove acting as the stigma across the very tip. The ovary is subtended by four line- to awl-shaped scales of about 1 mm (0.04 in) long.

=== Differences with related species ===
The Breede River pincushion differs in its lax habit with many horizontal branches, broad cone-shaped receptacle, narrow based perianth tube that is inflated higher up, to be suddenly much inflated where it merges in the silky hairy perianth claws, and the egg-shaped pollen-presenter.

== Taxonomy ==
Carl Thunberg was the first who collected the Breede River pincushion for science, but did not give a description, nor did he give a location. He labeled it Protea conocarpa β. It is likely that the specimen was picked on Thunberg's journey when passing through Storms Vlei when he was heading for a cattle post at Tygerhoek, near present-day Caledon, in 1772. It was only found again by Robert Harold Compton in 1924 near McGregor. The species was only described in 1970 by John Patrick Rourke.

The species name utriculosum means "having a bladder".

== Distribution, habitat and ecology ==
The Breederiver pincushion can be primarily found in the area of McGregor, Robertson and Stormsvlei, and along the north slopes of the Potberg, all the way to the mouth of the Breede River.

L. utriculosum exclusively grows on north facing, dry and very rocky slopes at 60–600 m (200–2000 ft) elevation. Along its distribution range, average annual precipitation is 250–380 mm (10–15 in), most of which falls during the winter half year. The soil it grows on is weathered Table Mountain Sandstone/Quartzite in the southeast and either Table Mountain Sandstone or Witteberg Quartzite to the northwest. The species may form quite dense stands locally. Some of the locations have such sparse vegetation that fire is not sustained, and many old plants can be found, their main stems tightly wedged in the crevices between the rocks.

== Conservation ==
The Breede River pincushion is considered a species of least concern, with a stable population size.
