= R62 (South Africa) =

Provincial route in South Africa

Provincial route R62

Route information
- Maintained by WCDTPW and ECDRPW
- Length: 504 km (313 mi)

Major junctions
- West end: R60 near Ashton
- N12 in Oudtshoorn; N9 / N12 near Holgate; N9 near Uniondale; N2 near Humansdorp
- East end: R102 near Humansdorp

Location
- Country: South Africa
- Major cities: Ashton, Montagu, Barrydale, Ladismith, Calitzdorp, Oudtshoorn, Joubertina, Kareedouw, Humansdorp

Highway system
- Numbered routes of South Africa
← R61	→ R63

The R62 is a provincial route in South Africa that connects Ashton with Humansdorp. The R62 runs through the Little Karoo and the Langkloof, passing through Montagu, Ladismith, Calitzdorp, Oudtshoorn, and Joubertina.

== Route ==
Detailed Route

=== Western Cape ===
The R62 begins in the Breede River Valley at an intersection with the R60, 5 km (3.1 mi) east of Ashton. It immediately crosses the Langeberg Mountains via the Cogmanskloof Pass, entering the Little Karoo on the opposite side of the mountains and passing through Montagu. It then follows the northern foothills of the Langberg mountains as far as Barrydale, before heading in a north-easterly direction to Ladismith. The route then heads east to follow the Swartberg Mountains, crossing the Gamka River through the Huisrivier Pass and passing through Calitzdorp before reaching the Little Karoo's largest town, Oudtshoorn.

At Oudtshoorn, the R62 meets the N12 and they join to be concurrent southwards for 33 km (21 mi) (crossing the Olifants River) until reaching the N9/N12 intersection at the northern edge of the Outeniqua Mountains. The route then leaves the N12 and immediately becomes concurrent with the N9 in an easterly direction for 71 km (44 mi) until the combined N9/R62 route reaches the head of the Langkloof valley near the Potjiesberg Pass south of Uniondale.

At the head of the Langkloof valley, the R62 branches off from the N9 and, still heading in an easterly direction, follows the valley for approximately 160 km (99 mi) towards the coastal plain to exit the Little Karoo. It passes through Avontuur and then after passing Haarlem crosses into the Eastern Cape.

=== Eastern Cape ===
The route then passes through Joubertina and Kareedouw. The route eventually emerges on to the coastal plain near Humansdorp, upon which it crosses the N2 coastal highway and terminates immediately thereafter at an intersection with the old coastal road, the R102.

== Tourism ==
The R62 is associated with the Route 62 tourist route connecting Cape Town and Gqeberha (formerly named Port Elizabeth).
