= Breede River Local Municipality =

Breede River Local Municipality may refer to either of two neighbouring municipalities in the Western Cape province of South Africa:

- Breede Valley Local Municipality, with its seat at Worcester
- Langeberg Local Municipality, formerly the Breede River/Winelands Local Municipality, with its seat at Ashton
