= Dutch Reformed Church, Robertson =

Church in Robertson, South Africa

Coordinates: 33°48′12″S 19°52′52″E

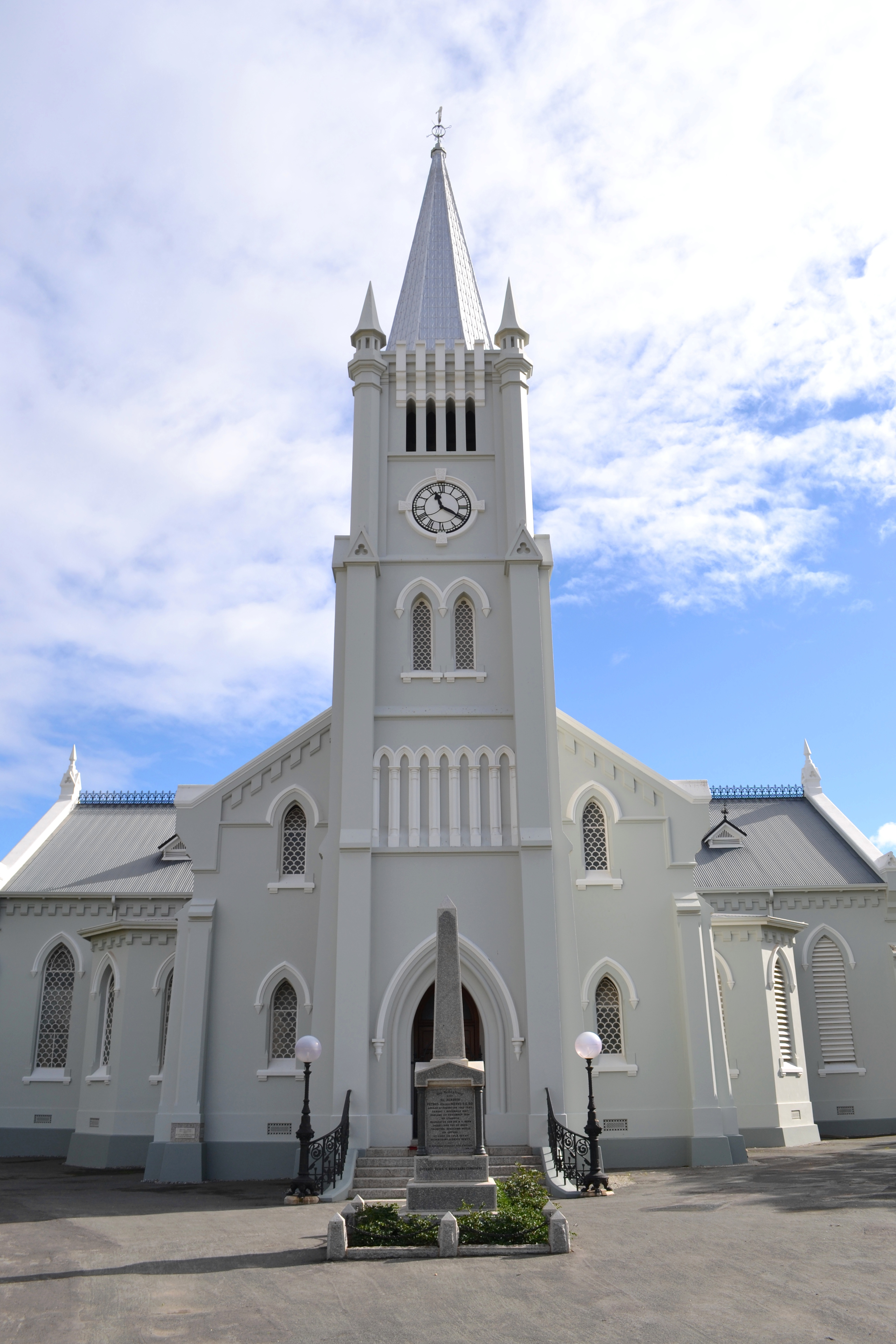

The Dutch Reformed Church in Robertson is a large rural congregation in Robertson, South Africa, in the province of the Western Cape and the NG Church's Synod of the Western and Southern Cape. It was founded in 1853 as the 52nd congregation in the entire Church, but is currently (2015) the 51st oldest congregation after the incorporation of the NG congregation Middelburg, Cape with its daughter congregation, Middelburg-Uitsig, in 2010.

== Ministers ==
- Carel Hendrik de Smidt, 1859 – 21 January 1861 (died in office)
- Andrew McGregor, 1862–1902 (after whom McGregor was named)
- Dr. Hendrik Petrus van der Merwe, 1903 – March 1925
- Alexander Gustav Timon Venter, 1905 (assistant preacher)
- John Murray, 1910–1917
- Stefanus Jacobus Perold, 1918–1919
- Jan Gysbert Muller, 1919–1924
- Cornelis Vermaak Nel, 1925–1935 (emeritus; died on 4 June 1936)
- Jacobus Wilhelmus Snyman, 1926–1932
- A.S. Cronjé, 1933–1939
- T.J. Kotze, 1936–1942
- Erasmus Albertus Venter, 1939–1944
- J.W. Snyman, 1926–1932
- Prof. Dr. Frederik Johannes Mentz Potgieter, 1943–1946 (after which professor at the Seminary)
- Dr. Daniel Johannes Louw, 1946–1949
- Sarel Johannes Lodewicus Marais, 1945–1962
- Herman Charles Kinghorn, 1950–1952
- J.N.F. O'Kennedy, 1951–1956
- Henry Charles Hopkins, 1952–1955 (chaplain in the SAW)
- Hendrik Winterbach, 1961–1966
- Paul Albertus du Toit, 1967–1979
- Abraham Jacobus de Villiers, 1967–1973
- Andries Gustav Stephanus Gouws, 1971 – 24 May 1987 (emeritus)
- Pieter Jurgens Steyn, 1987 – 30 November 2014
- M. Joubert, ? – 8 December 2019 (emeritus)
- Janlu Kuyler, 2020–present
