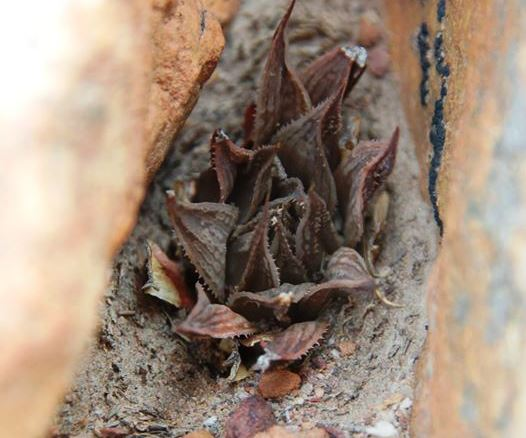

Scientific classification
- Kingdom: Plantae
- Clade: Tracheophytes
- Clade: Angiosperms
- Clade: Monocots
- Order: Asparagales
- Family: Asphodelaceae
- Subfamily: Asphodeloideae
- Genus: Haworthia
- Species: H. maculata

Binomial name
- Haworthia maculata (Poelln.) M.B.Bayer, (1976)

Synonyms
- Haworthia intermedia var. maculata (Poelln.) Esterhuizen; Haworthia schuldtiana var. maculata Poelln.

= Haworthia maculata =

Species of succulent

Haworthia maculata is a perennial succulent belonging to the genus Haworthia and is part of the fynbos. The species is endemic to the Western Cape and occurs from Worcester to Robertson.
