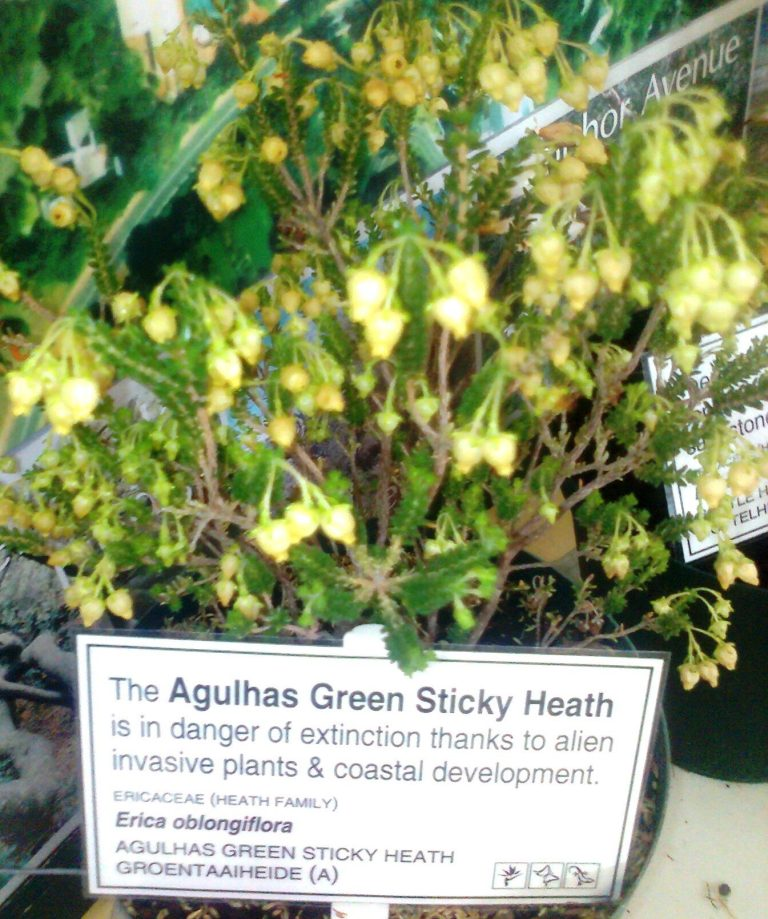

Scientific classification
- Kingdom: Plantae
- Clade: Tracheophytes
- Clade: Angiosperms
- Clade: Eudicots
- Clade: Asterids
- Order: Ericales
- Family: Ericaceae
- Genus: Erica
- Species: E. oblongiflora

Binomial name
- Erica oblongiflora Benth.

Synonyms
- Erica decurrens Klotzsch ex Benth.; Ericoides oblongiflorum (Benth.) Kuntze

= Erica oblongiflora =

Species of flowering plant

Erica oblongiflora, the Agulhas green heath or sticky green heath, is a plant belonging to the genus Erica and is part of the fynbos. The species is endemic to the Western Cape. Here it occurs on the southern part of the Agulhas Plain to Cape Infanta. There are three subpopulations occurring in an area of 479 km². This area has been reduced due to encroachment of plants such as Acacia cyclops and grazing by livestock. The population at Infanta is threatened by coastal development.
