= R60 =

R60 may refer to:

== Automobiles ==
- BMW R60, a motorcycle
- Mini Countryman (R60), a sport utility vehicle
- Toyota Noah (R60), a minivan

== Other uses ==
- R-60 (missile), a Soviet air-to-air missile
- R60 (South Africa), a road
- Aeryon SkyRanger R60, an unmanned aerial vehicle
- R60: May impair fertility, a risk phrase
- R60, a commuter rail service on the Llobregat–Anoia Line, in Barcelona, Catalonia, Spain
- R60, a Ferris wheel designed by Ronald Bussink
