= Swellendam Local Municipality =

Swellendam
- Local municipality
- Seal

- Location in the Western Cape
- Coordinates: 34°00′S 20°30′E
- Country: South Africa
- Province: Western Cape
- District: Overberg
- Seat: Swellendam
- Wards: 5

Government
  - Type: Municipal council
  - Mayor: Francois du Rand (DA)

Area
  - Total: 3,835 km^{2} (1,481 sq mi)

Population (2022)
  - Total: 47,114
  - Density: 12.29/km^{2} (31.82/sq mi)

Racial makeup (2011)
  - Black African: 13.6%
  - Coloured: 67.9%
  - Indian/Asian: 0.3%
  - White: 16.7%

First languages (2011)
  - Afrikaans: 85.1%
  - Xhosa: 6.9%
  - English: 4.7%
  - Other: 3.3%
- Time zone: UTC+2 (SAST)
- Municipal code: WC034
- HDI (2021): 0.733 high

Swellendam Municipality (Afrikaans: Swellendam Munisipaliteit) is a local municipality located within the Overberg District Municipality, in the Western Cape province of South Africa. As of 2022, it had a population of 47,114. Its municipality code is WC034.

== Geography ==
The municipality covers an area of 3,835 square kilometres (1,481 sq mi) around the lower Breede River Valley, from the confluence of the confluence of the Breede River and Sonderend River downstream to the Breede River mouth on the Indian Ocean. It also extends westwards up the Sonderend River and northwards across the Langeberg mountains into the Little Karoo around the Warmwaterberg. The municipality abuts on the Cape Agulhas Municipality to the south, the Theewaterskloof Municipality to the west, the Langeberg Municipality to the northwest, the Kannaland Municipality to the northeast and the Hessequa Municipality to the east.

The principal town and location of the municipal headquarters is Swellendam, which as of 2011 had a population of 17,537. Suurbraak (pop. 2,252) is situated east of Swellendam at the southern end of Tradouws Pass which cuts through the Langeberg, while Barrydale (pop. 4,156) is at the other end of the pass on the edge of the Little Karoo. Buffeljagsrivier (pop. 1,439) is situated southeast of Swellendam on the river of the same name. Malgas (pop. 44) is located at a pontoon ferry on the Breede River, the last crossing of the river before it reaches the ocean. Infanta (pop. 90) is situated at the mouth of the river on its southern bank.

== Demographics ==
According to the 2022 South African census, the municipality had a population of 47,114 people. Of those, 67.9% described themselves as "Coloured," 16.7% as "White," and 13.6% as "Black African."

== History ==
At end of the apartheid era in the early 1990s, there were municipal councils for the towns of Swellendam and Barrydale, and a local council for Infanta. These councils were elected by the white residents of the towns. Coloured residents elected management committees, which were subordinate to the white local authorities, in Railton (Swellendam) and Smitsville (Barrydale). The former mission station of Suurbraak was governed by a management board, and the remaining rural areas fell under the Overberg Regional Services Council.

After the national elections of 1994 a process of local government transformation began, in which negotiations were held between the existing local authorities, political parties, and local community organisations. As a result of these negotiations, transitional local councils (TLCs) were created for each town and village. In December 1994 the Swellendam TLC was created, replacing the Municipality of Swellendam and the Railton Management Committee. In January 1995 the Barrydale TLC replaced the Barrydale Municipality and the Smitsville Management Committee. In the same month the Suurbraak TLC replaced the Suurbraak Management Board. In Infanta, where there had been no negotiations, the local council remained in place until October 1995 when it was converted into a TLC.

The transitional councils were initially made up of members nominated by the various parties to the negotiations, until May 1996 when elections were held. At these elections the Overberg District Council was established, replacing the Overberg Regional Services Council. Transitional representative councils (TRCs) were also elected to represent rural areas outside the TLCs on the District Council; the area that was to become the Swellendam Municipality included most of the Swellendam TRC as well as small areas of the Bredasdorp, Langeberg and Wynland TRCs.

At the local elections of December 2000 the TLCs and TRCs were dissolved, and the Swellendam Municipality was created as a single local authority incorporating both rural and urban areas.In 2011 rural land to the north and west of Barrydale was incorporated into the municipality when District Management Areas were abolished.

== Conservation areas ==
The most significant conservation areas are:

- Bontebok National Park
- Marloth Nature Reserve in the Langeberg
- Sanbona Wildlife Reserve

== Politics ==
The municipal council consists of eleven members elected by mixed-member proportional representation. Six councillors are elected by first-past-the-post voting in six wards, while the remaining five are chosen from party lists so that the total number of party representatives is proportional to the number of votes received.

In the election of 4 November 2026, no party won a majority of seats on the council.

The following table shows the results of the 2026 election.

Party	Ward			List			Total seats
Party	Votes	%	Seats	Votes	%	Seats	Total seats
Democratic Alliance	5,263	39.84	3	5,252	39.82	1	4
African National Congress	4,419	33.45	2	4,380	33.21	2	4
Patriotic Alliance	2,795	21.16	1	2,846	21.58	1	2
Freedom Front Plus	541	4.10	0	565	4.28	1	1
Independent candidates	38	0.29	0				0
6 other parties	155	1.17	0	147	1.11	0	0
Total	13,211	100.00	6	13,190	100.00	5	11
Valid votes	13,211	98.97		13,190	99.01		
Invalid/blank votes	138	1.03		132	0.99		
Total votes	13,349	100.00		13,322	100.00		
Registered voters/turnout	23,937	55.77		23,937	55.65		
