= Mother City SkyDiving - Cape Town =

Sports skydiving drop zone

Mother City SkyDiving
- Abbreviation: MCSD / MCS
- Formation: 21 November 2014
- Type: Sports Skydiving Club
- Legal status: Recreational Club
- Purpose: Sports Skydiving
- Headquarters: Diepkloof Airfield
- Location: 70 km north of Cape Town / 12 km north of Malmesbury
- Coordinates: 33°21′06.93″S 18°41′55.11″E
- Region served: Cape Town
- Services: Sports Skydiving / Tandem Introductory Skydiving
- Affiliations: Parachute Association of South Africa
- Website: www.MotherCitySkyDiving.co.za

Mother City SkyDiving - Cape Town is a sports skydiving drop zone licensed by the Parachute Association of South Africa (PASA) and the South African Civil Aviation Authority (CAA).

== Status ==
The drop zone provides a service for experienced sport skydivers, and offers Tandem Introductory Skydiving.

== Operations ==
Operations are conducted in accordance with the PASA Manual of Procedures (MOPs) and part 105 of the South African Civil Aviation Authority (CAA) Regulation, and as per terms and conditions laid down by Mother City SkyDiving.

== Malmesbury Show ==
At part of the Malmesbury Show the team has taken a number of local celebrities on a tandem skydive as part of the main event.

- Swartland Mayor Tijimen van Essen was the first to tandem skydive into the Malmesbury Show in 2015.
- In 2016, Alderman James Vos, the then Shadow Minister for Tourism, made a tandem skydive over the show.
- In 2017 local musician Pietman die skot arrived from the sky into the event.
- In 2018 Bok Radio presenter LeLue vander Sandt jumped into the show.

== Interschools ==
In 2019 the team performed parachute displays into local Interschools Rugby competitions: Swartland vs Hugenote; Durbanville vs Stellenberg; and, what is regarded as the largest Interschools rugby competition in South Africa, Paarl Gimnasium vs Paarl Boys High.

== Awards ==
In May 2020, Mother City SkyDiving's "Let's Jump out of a Plane" video submission for The International Tourism Film Festival Africa (ITFFA) won first place in the category Sport & Adventure Tourism.

The ITFFA winning video was subsequently entered to the International Committee of Tourism Film Festivals (CIFFT) for international adjudication and screening.

== Records ==
In 2018 South African musician, DJ and Saxophonist George Sax became the highest and fastest saxophonist in the world when he played his saxophone in freefall to produce a music video for his 'Touch the Sun' track, featuring Si-Anne on vocals, at the drop zone. at Mother City SkyDiving.

Mother City SkyDiving is 70km from Cape Town

== Location ==
Mother City SkyDiving is situated at Diepkloof Airfield, adjacent to the N7 Highway 70 km north of Cape Town and 12 km north of Malmesbury, in the Swartland Municipality of the Western Cape Province of South Africa.

== See also ==
- Parachute Association of South Africa
- Parachuting
