= Rustenburg Airfield =

- IATA: none; ICAO: FARG

Summary
- Airport type: Public
- Owner: Rustenburg Municipality
- Operator: Rustenburg Flying Club
- Serves: Rustenburg, North West, South Africa
- Elevation AMSL: 3,700 ft / 1,128 m
- Coordinates: 25°38′39″S 027°16′16″E

Map
- Location of airport in North West province Location of North West in South Africa

Runways
Direction	Length		Surface
Direction	m	ft	Surface
16/34	1,224	4,016	Asphalt

Rustenburg Airfield (ICAO: FARG), licensed according to South African Civil Aviation Authority standards, is a municipal airport situated near Rustenburg in the North West province of South Africa.

== Facilities ==
The airport resides at an elevation of 3,700 feet (1,128 m) above mean sea level. It has one runway designated 16/34 with an asphalt surface measuring 1,224 by 15 metres (4,016 ft × 49 ft).

== Communication ==
The Communication Frequency for Rustenburg Airfield is 122.4

== Rustenburg SkyDiving Club ==
The airfield is home to Rustenburg SkyDiving Club, a Parachute Association of South Africa licensed drop zone.

== Nearby airports ==
- Pilanesberg International Airport
- Lanseria International Airport

== Nearby attractions ==
- Sun City
- Pilanesberg Game Reserve
- SkyDive Rustenburg

== See also ==
- Parachute Association of South Africa PASA
- South African Civil Aviation Authority SA CAA
