= Cogmanskloof Pass =

Mountain pass in South Africa

Coordinates: 33.808°S 20.094°E

Cogmanskloof Pass is a mountain pass in Western Cape, South Africa, on the R62 provincial road over the Langeberg between Ashton in the Boland and Montagu in the Little Karoo. The pass was built by Thomas Charles John Bain and completed in 1877 as one of the first routes inland through that mountain range.

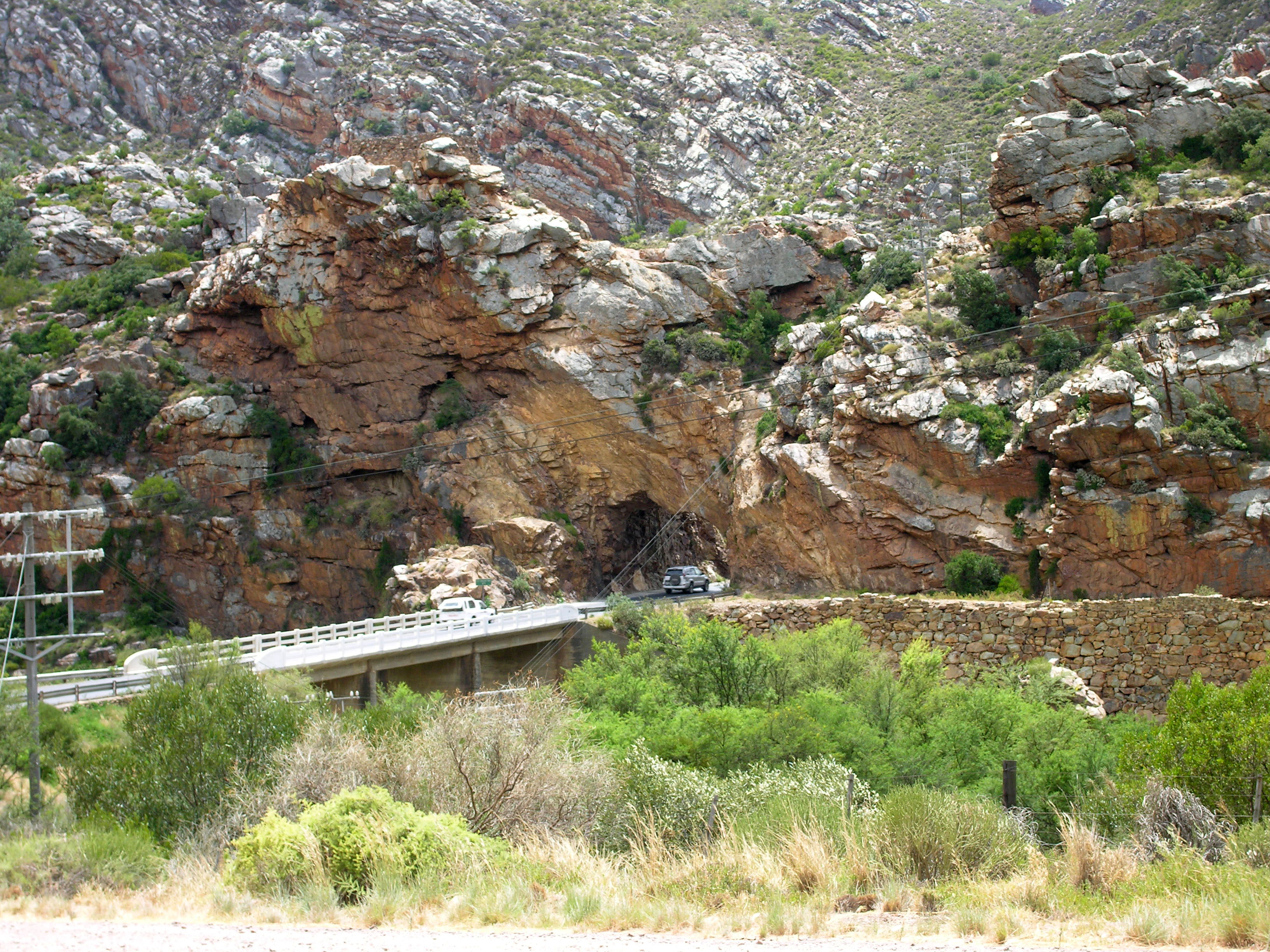
The pass

== History ==
The first pass was a rough wagon trail following the course of the Kingna river through the gorge, crossing that river several times and periodically suffering from flood closures. Bain's team began work in 1873 and the new pass was opened on February 28, 1887 at a cost of £12,000. The route was paved in 1931, and features a 15-m-long, 5-m-high tunnel through the hill known as Kalkoenkrans, atop which the ruins of a fort from the Second Boer War remain visible today.

== Today ==
The modern highway was completed in 1953.

== Sources ==
- Standard Encyclopaedia of Southern Africa, vol. 3. Cape Town: Nasou, 1971.
