= Skydive Robertson =

Coordinates: 33°48′46.55″S 19°54′3.78″E

The Western Province Sport Parachute Club (WPSPC) provides a facility for sports skydiving and student training and is operated and managed on a volunteer basis by a committee elected by its members. The club is a not-for-gain body corporate under common law.

WPSPC was officially founded on 8 May 1972, the original operations base was at Modderfontein Farm near Citrusdal.

Since July 2008 WPSPC has been based at Robertson Airfield just outside the town of Robertson, on South Africa's wine route – Route 62. The operation is now known as, trades as, and operates as, Skydive Robertson.

2012 marked the 40th anniversary of WPSPC.

== Skydive Robertson ==
Skydive Robertson is a Parachute Association of South Africa (PASA) approved and registered drop zone, licensed for sports skydiving and student training. Operations are conducted under the supervision of a PASA approved Chief Instructor and in accordance with the PASA manual of procedures and part 105 of the South African Civil Aviation Authority Regulation.

Skydive Robertson is 147 km from Cape Town CBD.

== Location ==
Skydive Robertson is located at Robertson Airfield, 1 km to the east of the town of Robertson in the Western Cape Province on South Africa's wine route – Route 62.

== Operations ==
Skydive Robertson operates on weekends and public holidays and offers tandem skydiving, static line progression training, accelerated freefall progression training and provides a facility for sports skydivers.

== History ==
The Western Province Sport Parachute Club (WPSPC) was officially founded on 8 May 1972.

2012 marks the 40th anniversary of WPSPC.

=== Skydive Citrusdal ===
The original WPSPC operations base was at Modderfontein Farm near Citrusdal. The operation became known as Skydive Citrusdal. In December 2006 the farm was sold and the club had to relocate.

=== Skydive Ceres ===
In January 2007 WPSPC temporarily moved operations to Ceres.

=== Skydive Robertson ===
In July 2008 WPSPC moved operations to Robertson Airfield just outside the town of Robertson on South Africa's wine route – Route 62.

== South African National Skydiving Championships 2011 ==
Skydive Robertson hosted the South African National Skydiving Championships in 2011, this is the first time South African National Skydiving Championships was held in the Western Cape.

== See also ==
- Parachute Association of South Africa
- Robertson, Western Cape
- Robertson Airfield
- Route 62 (South Africa)
