= João Infante =

Portuguese explorer

João Infante (fl. 15th century) was a Portuguese explorer of the African coast. He accompanied Bartolomeu Dias in his journey around the Cape of Good Hope in 1487/1488 by leading a second caravel, the São Pantaleão (named after Saint Pantaleon).

Some places in South Africa are or were named after him:

- The Rio do Infante, now the Great Fish River, Eastern Cape
- Cape Infanta, Western Cape
- Infanta, Western Cape: a small settlement
