= Malgas =

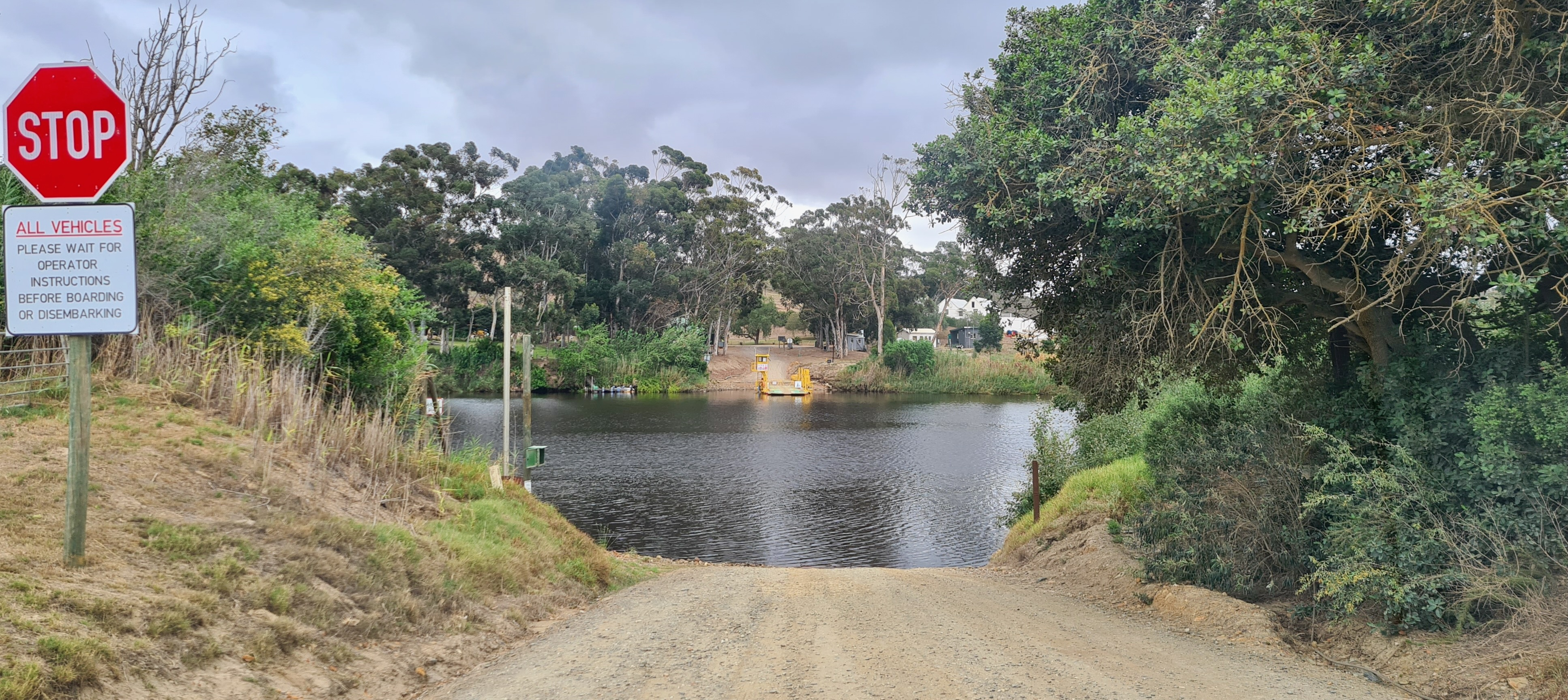

- Location within Western Cape Location within South Africa
- Coordinates: 34.3°S 20.583°E
- Country: South Africa
- Province: Western Cape
- District: Overberg
- Municipality: Swellendam

Area
  - Total: 0.77 km^{2} (0.30 sq mi)

Population (2011)
  - Total: 44
  - Density: 57/km^{2} (150/sq mi)

Racial makeup (2011)
  - Black African: 11.4%
  - Coloured: 50.0%
  - White: 38.6%

First languages (2011)
  - Afrikaans: 74.4%
  - English: 18.6%
  - S. Ndebele: 2.3%
  - Xhosa: 2.3%
  - Other: 2.3%
- Time zone: UTC+2 (SAST)

Malgas (or Malagas) is a settlement on the right (southwest) bank of the Breede River in the Overberg region of the Western Cape. It is situated 25 kilometres north-west of the Breede River mouth at Witsand, and 30 kilometres south-east of Swellendam.

"Malgas" is the Afrikaans for gannet. The word "malgas" is probably an adaptation of the Portuguese: mangas de velludo, lit. 'velvet sleeves', referring to the Cape gannet (Morus capensis) with its black-tipped wings. According to the 2011 census, Malgas has a population of 44 people in 20 households.

== Malgas Pont ==
It is well known for the "pont", a man-hauled pontoon cable ferry across the Breede River, which is the last of its type in South Africa. The man-hauled ferry has been replaced by a motor driven ferry. The new ferry consists of a series of plastic floats contained within a yellow steel framework structure. Propulsion is provided by a single diesel engine which provides power for 2 hydraulic thrusters.

Breede River crossing on the Malgas Pont

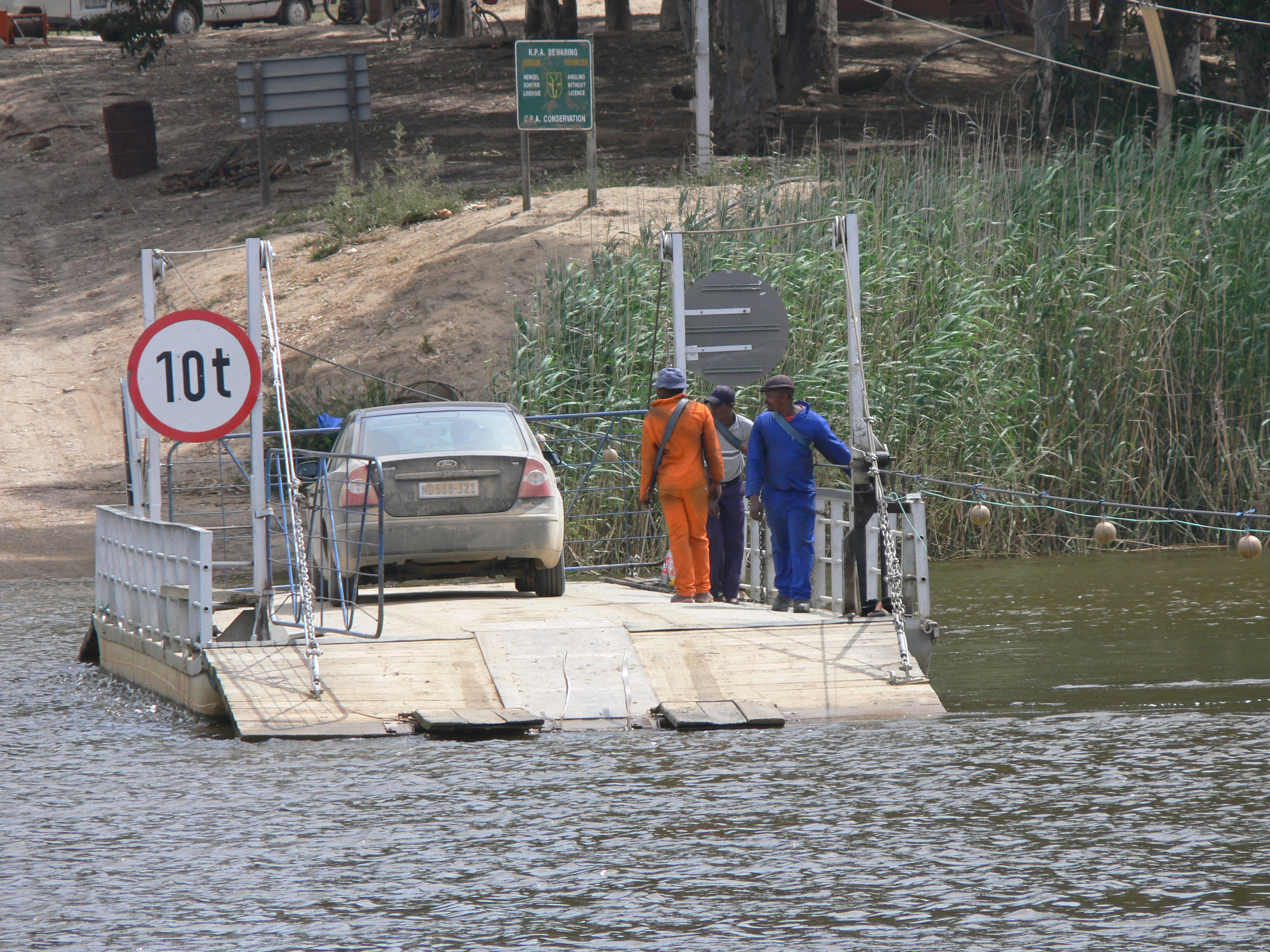
The old Malgas cable ferry on the Breede River

Boarding the Malgas Pont
