= Route 62 (South Africa) =

Route 62

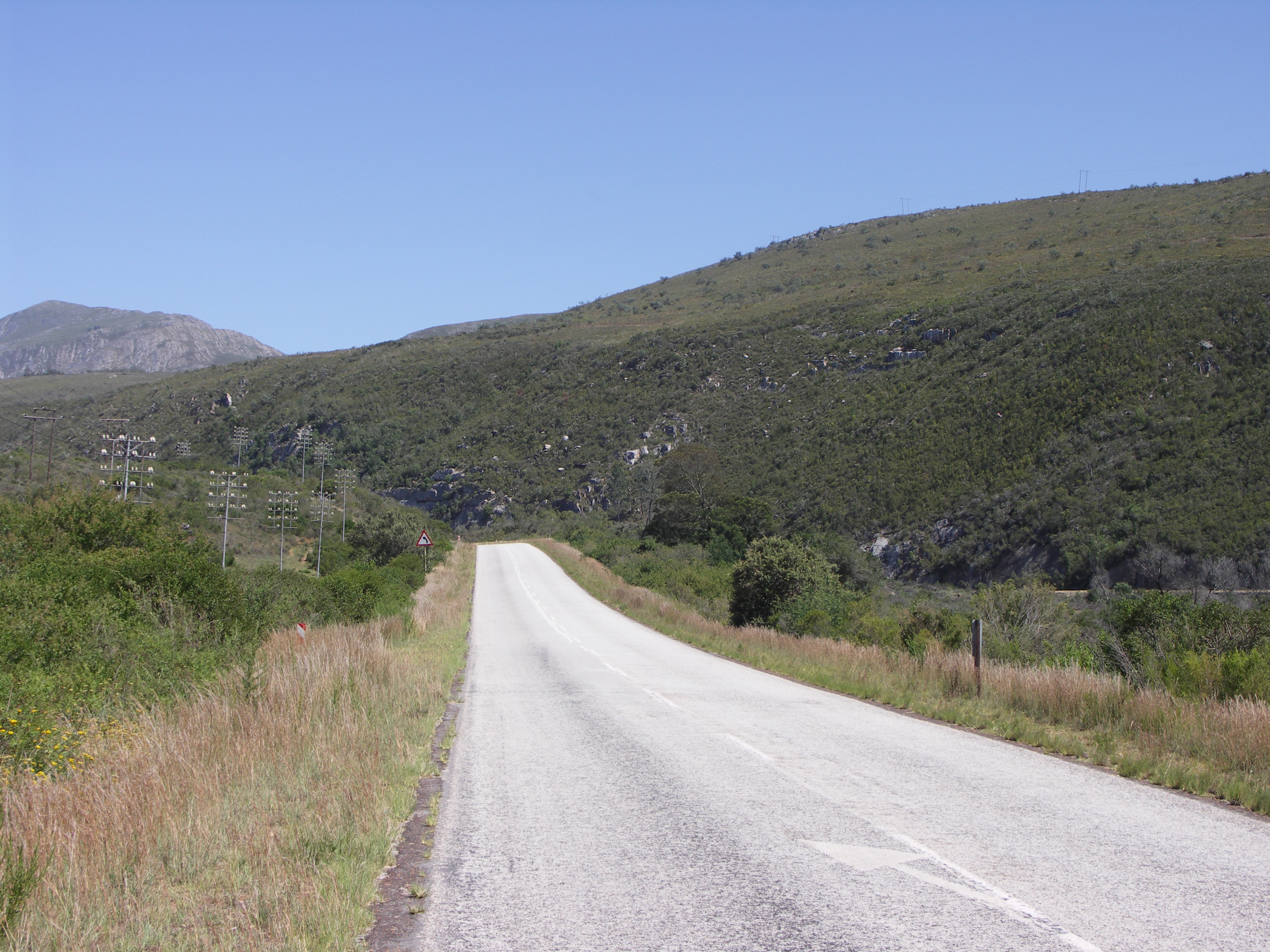

Route information
- Length: 850 km (530 mi)
- Component highways: N1; R60; R62; N2

Major junctions
- West end: Cape Town
- East end: Gqeberha

Location
- Country: South Africa
- Provinces: Western Cape, Eastern Cape

Highway system
- Numbered routes of South Africa

Route 62 is a tourist route in South Africa that meanders between Cape Town, Oudtshoorn, the Garden Route, and Gqeberha (formerly Port Elizabeth), offering the scenic alternative to the N2 highway. Route 62 is named for the R62 provincial route, which it follows from Montagu to Humansdorp, but the tourist route extends further along other highways to Cape Town and Gqeberha.

Also known as the Wine Route, Route 62 leads through the wine-growing areas of Wellington, Tulbagh, Worcester, Robertson and the Klein Karoo and is thus one of the longest wine routes in the world. Activities along Route 62 include wine tours, safari drives, tribal art, cultural tours, museums, hiking, mountain climbing, 4x4 routes, canoeing, horse riding, ostrich riding, fishing, caving, and skydiving.

Route 62 spans a distance of 850 km (530 mi) from Cape Town to Gqeberha.

== Places of interest ==
Between Cape Town and Gqeberha are the following towns:

- Montagu – with its thermal baths and fruit trees
- Barrydale and Ladismith – beautiful towns, popular amongst hikers
- Zoar and Amalienstein – former mission stations
- Calitzdorp – the centre of the South African Port wine production
- Oudtshoorn – South African centre of ostrich breeding and cave exploring
- Robertson – The valley of wine and roses
