= Bonnievale, South Africa =

Bonnievale
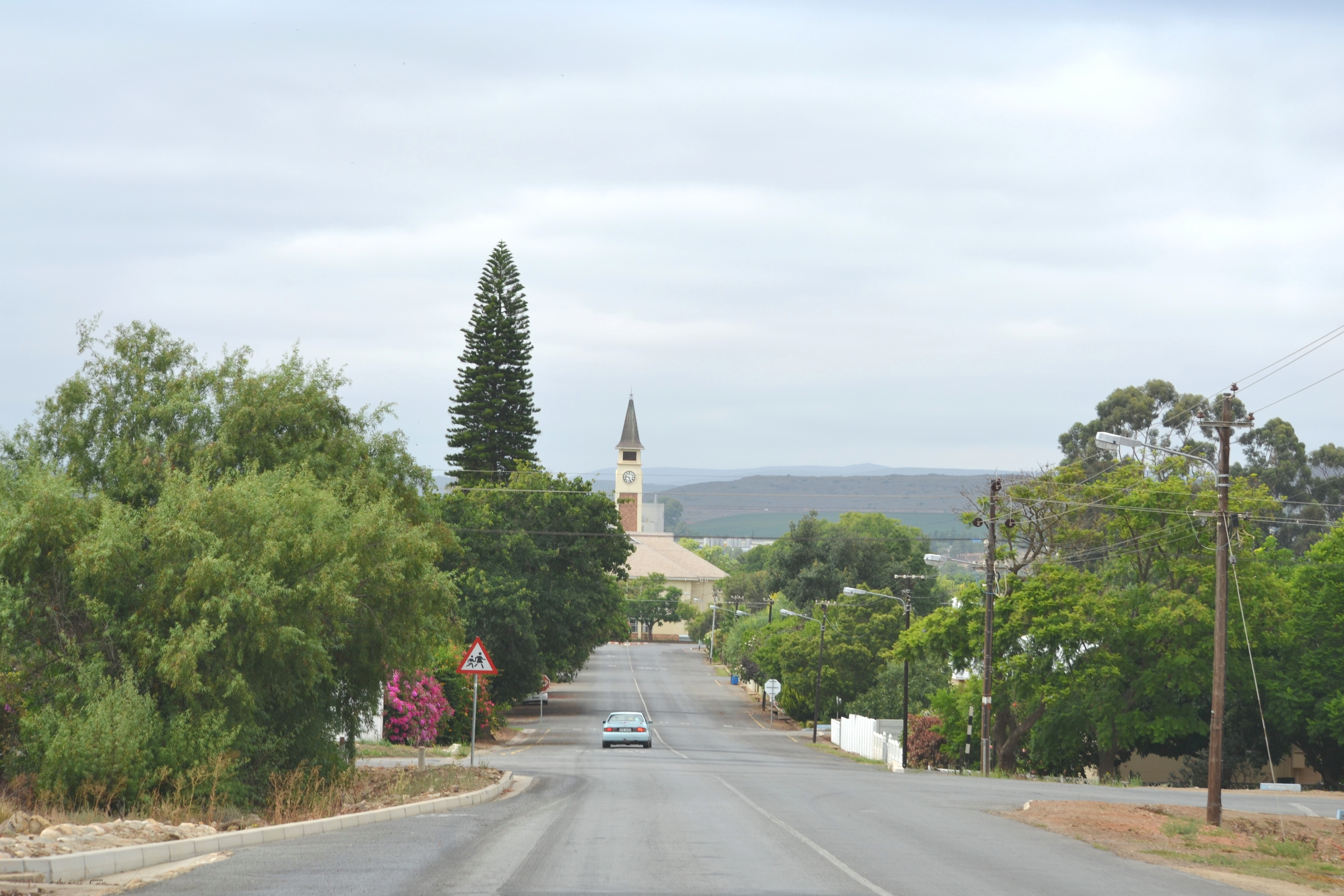
- Church street in Bonnievale

- Location within Western Cape Location within South Africa
- Coordinates: 33°55′39″S 20°6′2″E
- Country: South Africa
- Province: Western Cape
- District: Cape Winelands
- Municipality: Langeberg

Area
  - Total: 27.07 km^{2} (10.45 sq mi)

Population (2011)
  - Total: 9,092
  - Density: 335.9/km^{2} (869.9/sq mi)

Racial makeup (2011)
  - Black African: 11.1%
  - Coloured: 75.3%
  - Indian/Asian: 0.2%
  - White: 10.7%
  - Other: 2.7%

First languages (2011)
  - Afrikaans: 89.7%
  - Xhosa: 6.0%
  - English: 1.7%
  - Sotho: 1.3%
  - Other: 1.3%
- Time zone: UTC+2 (SAST)
- Postal code (street): 6730
- PO box: 6730
- Area code: 023

Bonnievale is a settlement in the Cape Winelands District Municipality in the Western Cape province of South Africa.

The town is 64 km southeast of Worcester, in the Breede River Valley. It was founded in 1922, and was named after the railway siding called Vale at its opening in 1902 and Bonnie Vale in 1917. Municipal status was gained in April 1953. Bonnievale is surrounded by the Langeberge and Riversonderend Mountains. Situated on the Cape Wine Route, the area caters to tourists with locally made cheese and wine, along with private game reserves and extensive hiking trails.

== Gallery ==
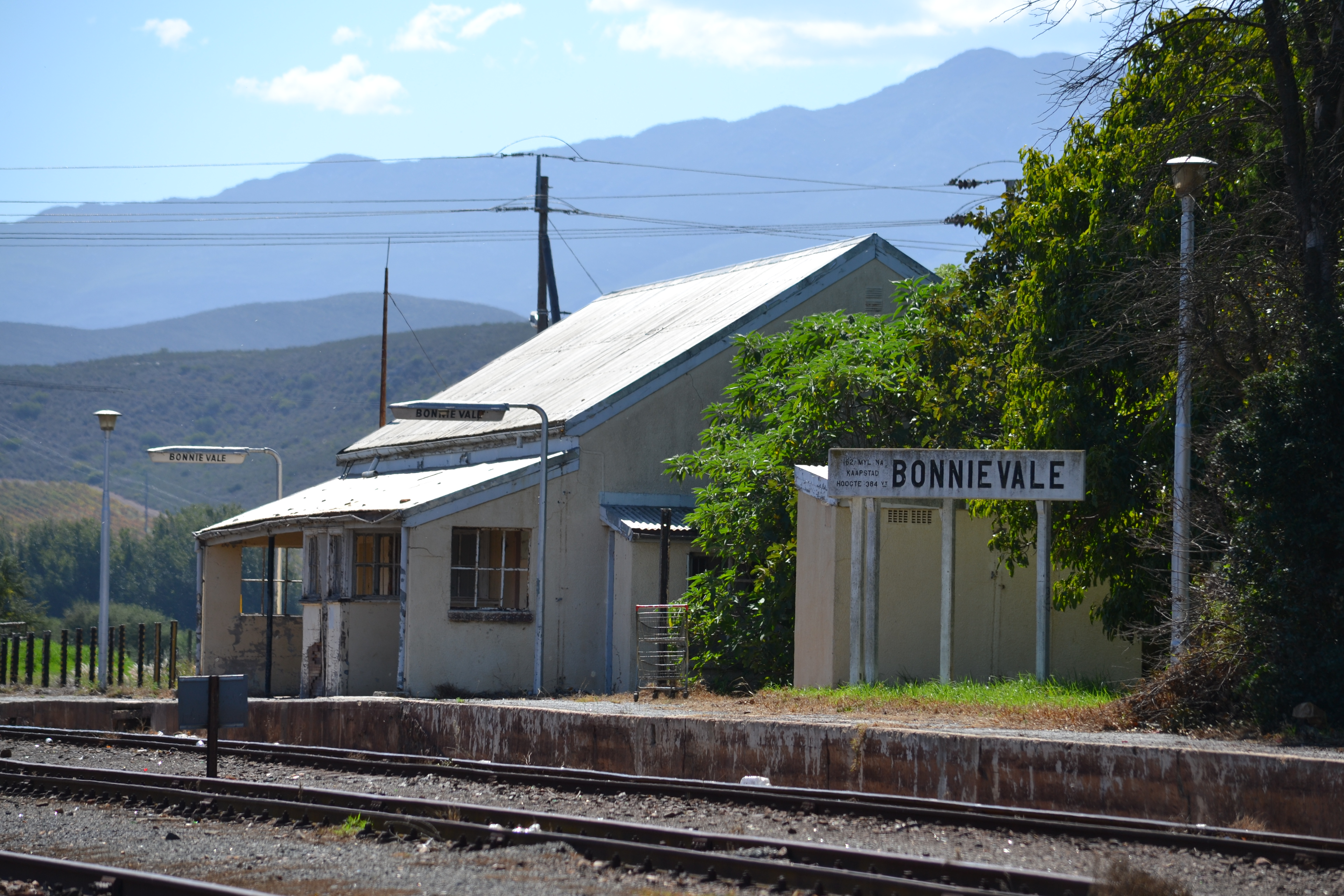
Old station building, 1922–2012

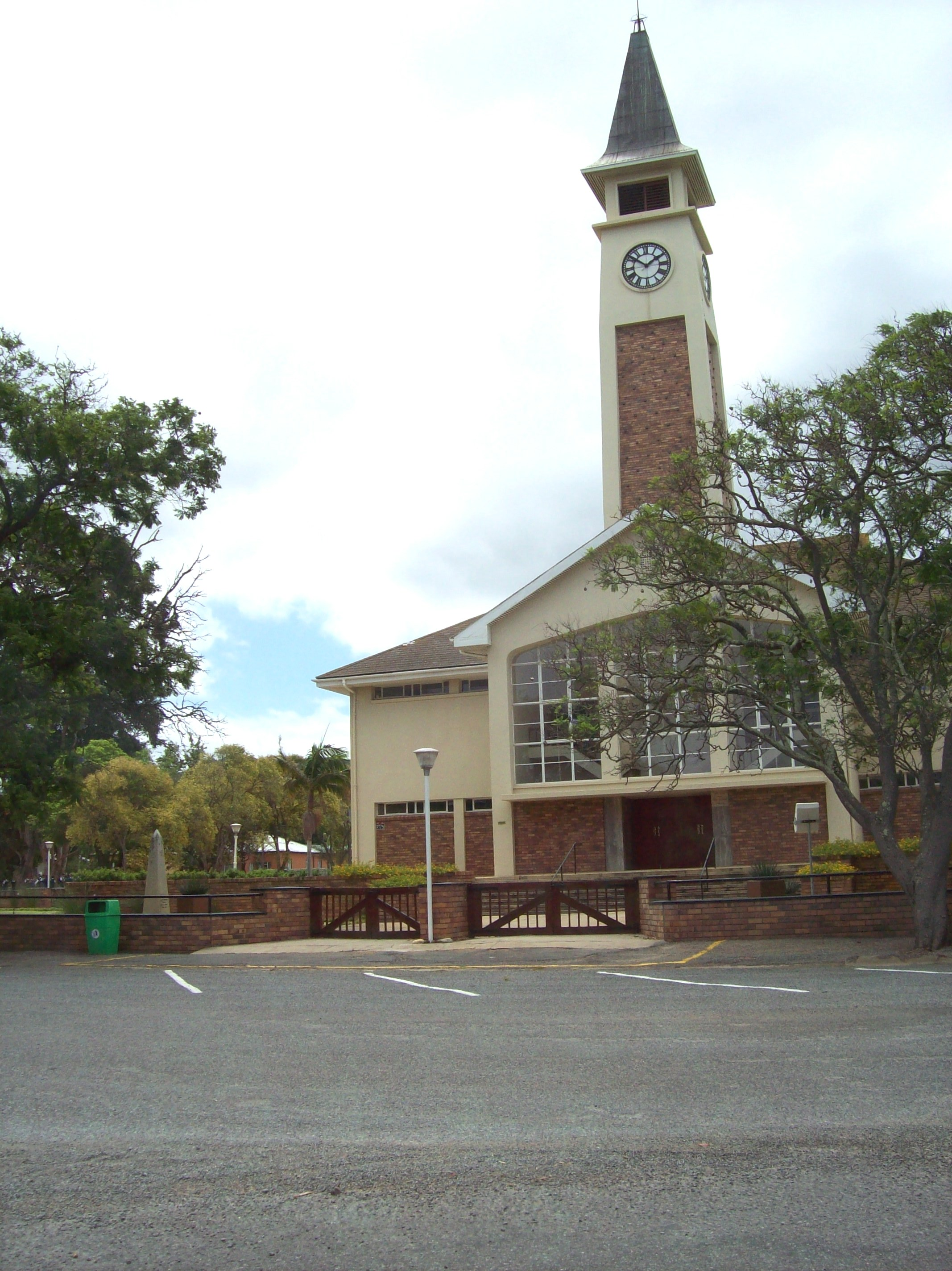
NG Church, built c. 1922

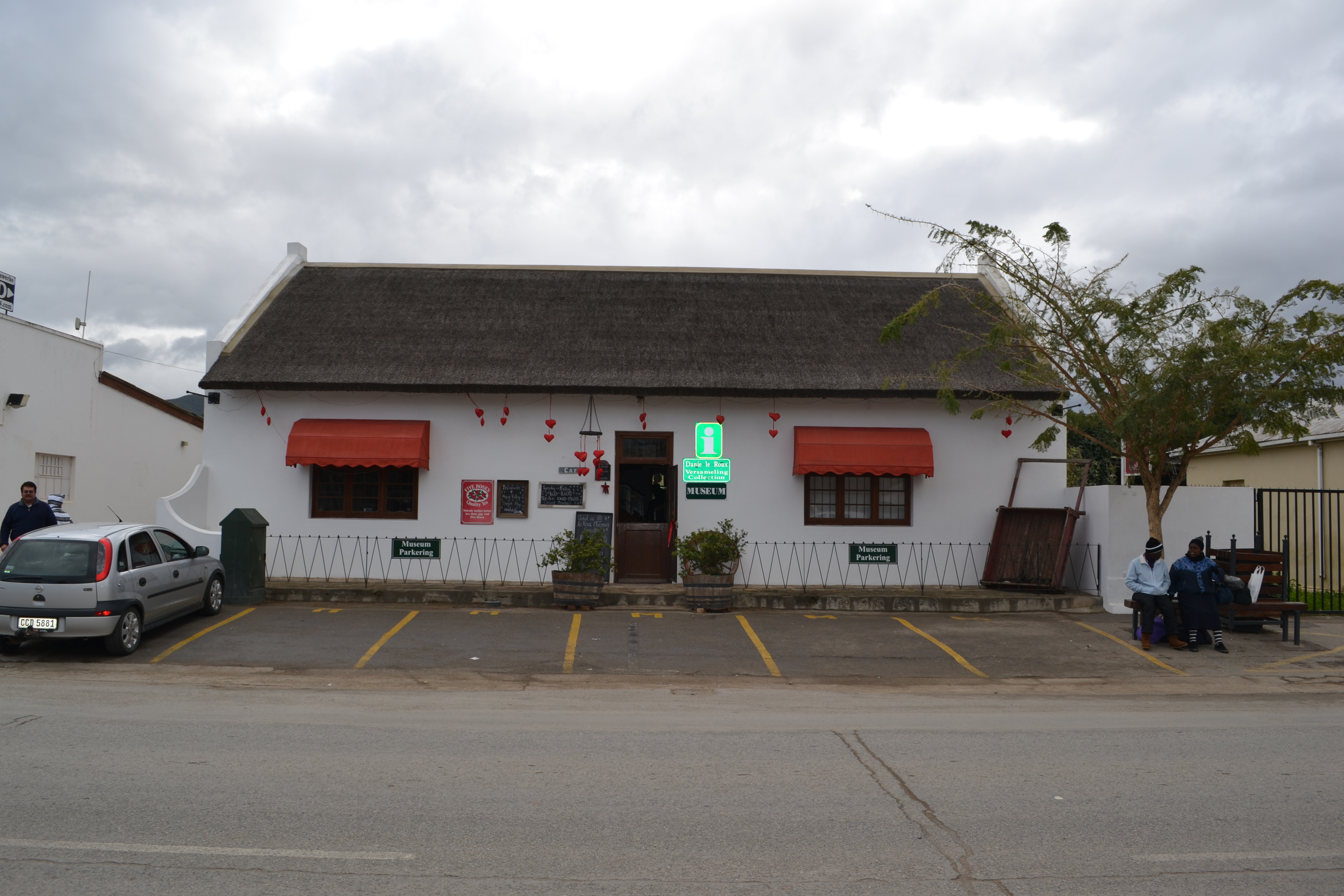
DJ le Roux Museum

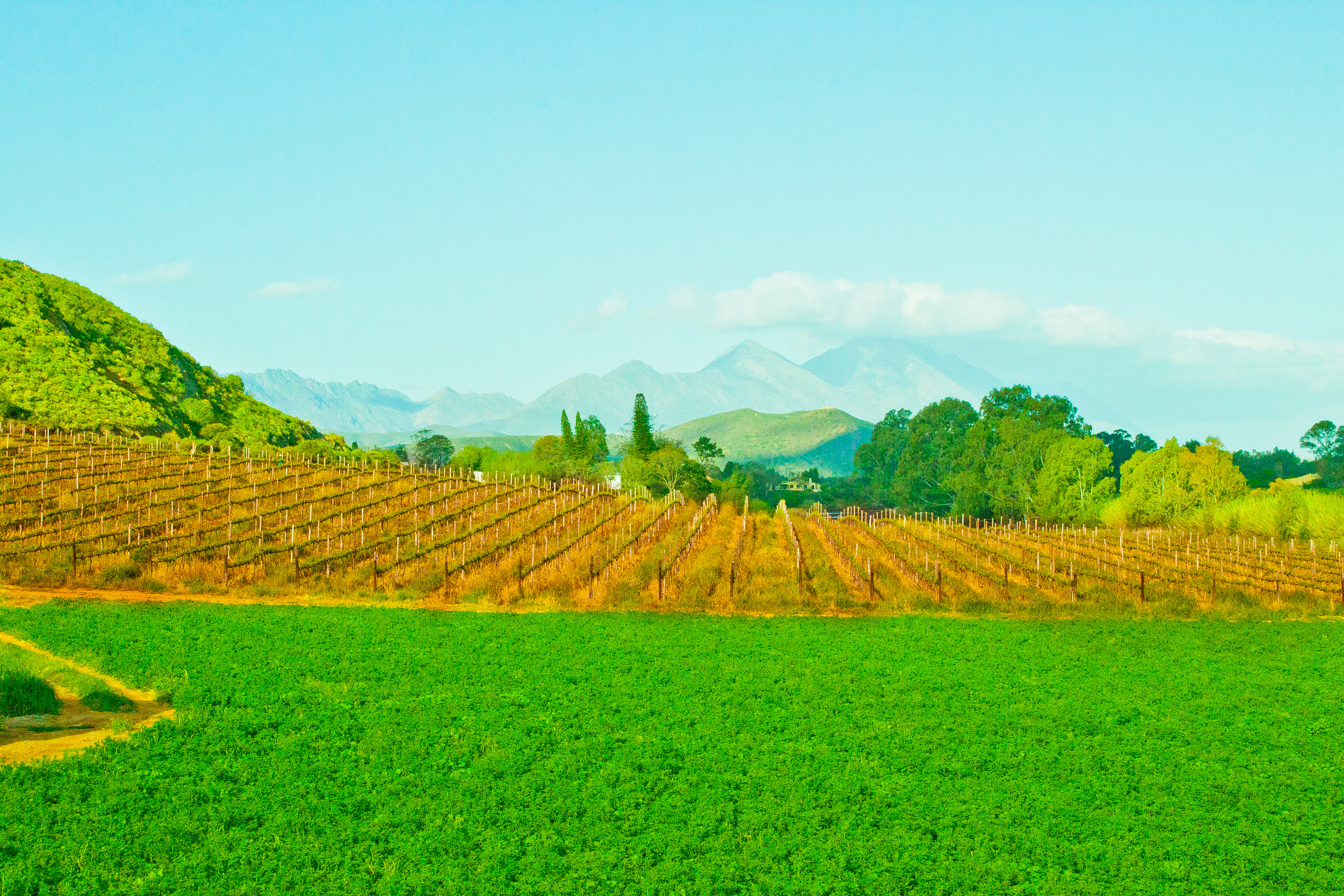
Weltevrede vineyards
