= Infanta, South Africa =

Infanta
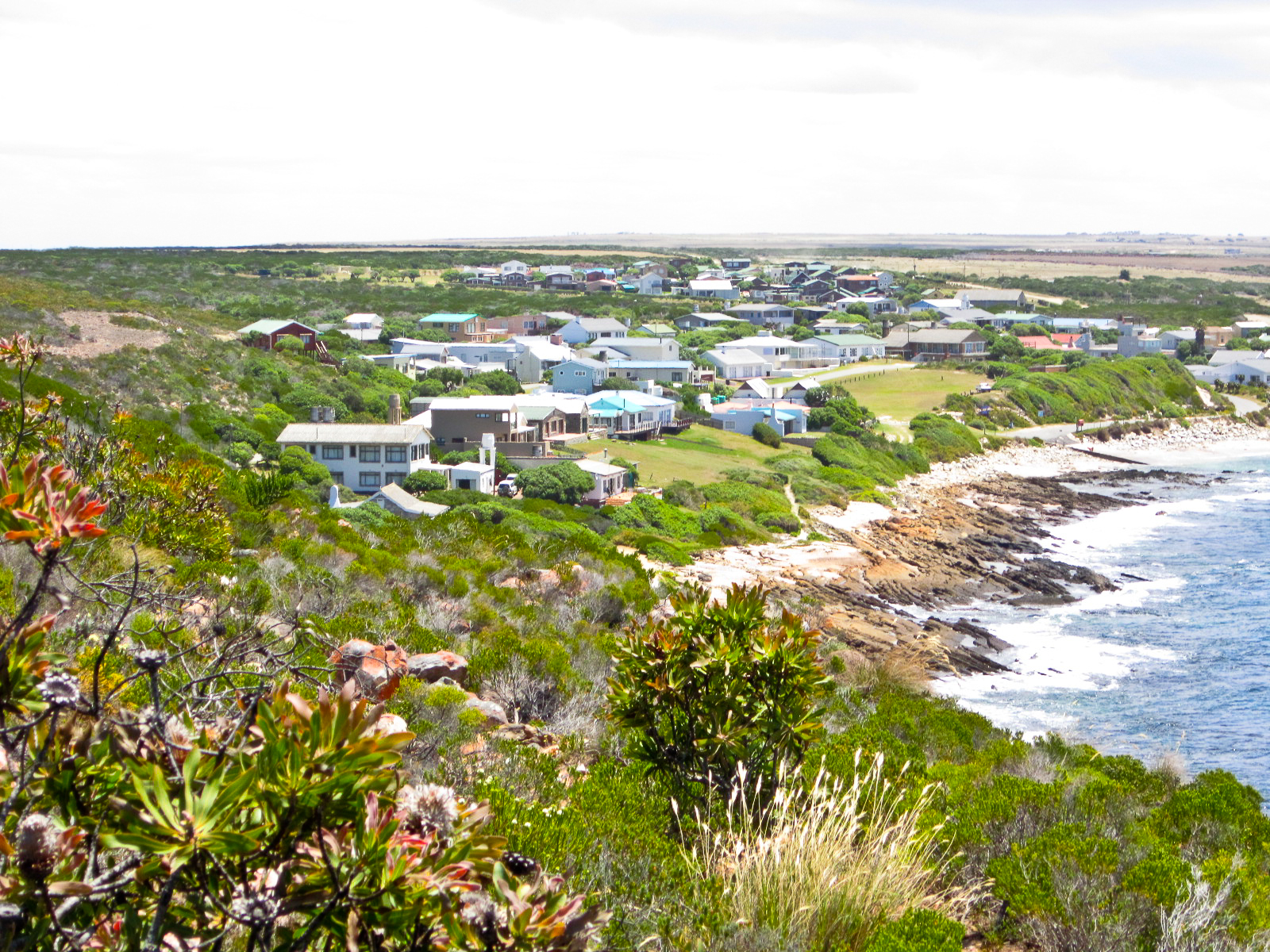
- The village of Infanta

- Location within Western Cape Location within South Africa
- Coordinates: 34°25′S 20°51′E
- Country: South Africa
- Province: Western Cape
- District: Overberg
- Municipality: Swellendam

Area
  - Total: 20.45 km^{2} (7.90 sq mi)

Population (2011)
  - Total: 90
  - Density: 4.4/km^{2} (11/sq mi)

Racial makeup (2011)
  - Black African: 8.9%
  - Coloured: 21.1%
  - White: 70.0%

First languages (2011)
  - Afrikaans: 50.0%
  - English: 46.7%
  - S. Ndebele: 1.1%
  - Sotho: 1.1%
  - Other: 1.1%
- Time zone: UTC+2 (SAST)

Infanta is a settlement in Overberg District Municipality in the Western Cape province of South Africa.

Seaside resort at the estuary of the Breede River, at St Sebastian Bay, some 80 km south-east of Swellendam. Takes its name from Cape Infanta several kilometres to the south, and from its situation on the Breede River. The cape was in turn named after captain João Infante, who commanded one of Bartolomeu Dias's caravels.
