= Langeberg Local Municipality =

Langeberg
- Local municipality
- Seal

- Location in the Western Cape
- Coordinates: 33°50′S 20°00′E
- Country: South Africa
- Province: Western Cape
- District: Cape Winelands
- Seat: Ashton
- Wards: 12

Government
  - Type: Municipal council
  - Mayor: Alderman Schalk W. van Eeden (DA)
  - Deputy Mayor: Alderman Christopher J. Grootboom (People's Democratic Movement South-Africa)

Area
  - Total: 4,518 km^{2} (1,744 sq mi)

Population (2022)
  - Total: 94,045
  - Density: 20.82/km^{2} (53.91/sq mi)

Racial makeup (2022)
  - Black African: 24.5%
  - Coloured: 61.7%
  - Indian/Asian: 0.1%
  - White: 12.9%

First languages (2011)
  - Afrikaans: 82.5%
  - Xhosa: 10.7%
  - English: 3.1%
  - Sotho: 1.3%
  - Other: 2.4%
- Time zone: UTC+2 (SAST)
- Municipal code: WC026

Langeberg Municipality (Afrikaans: Langeberg Munisipaliteit; Xhosa: uMasipala wase Langeberg), known before 28 August 2009 as Breede River/Winelands Municipality, is a local municipality located within the Cape Winelands District Municipality, in the Western Cape province of South Africa. As of 2022, it had a population of 94,045. Its municipality code is WC026.

== Geography ==
The municipality covers a land area of 4,518 square kilometres (1,744 sq mi) in the Breede River Valley and the west end of the Little Karoo. The Langeberg mountains run from northwest to southeast through the centre of the municipality, and the Breede River flows in the same direction south of the Langeberg. The Riviersonderend Mountains form the southern boundary of the municipality and the Koega Mountains form the northern boundary. It abuts on the Breede Valley Municipality to the northwest, the Laingsburg and Kannaland Municipalities to the northeast, the Swellendam Municipality to the southeast, and the Theewaterskloof Municipality to the southwest.

== Demographics ==
The 2022 South African Census reported a population of 94,045, decreasing at a rate of 0.37% annually from 2011. Of this population, 61.7% identified as "Coloured," 24.5% as "Black African," and 12.9% as "White."

According to the 2011 census the municipality has a population of 97,724 people in 25,125 households. Of this population, 70.3% describe themselves as "Coloured", 16.3% as "Black African", and 12.3% as "White". The first language of 82.5% of the population is Afrikaans, while 10.7% speak Xhosa, 3.1% speak English and 1.3% speak Sotho.

The largest town in the municipality is Robertson, which as of 2011 has a population of 27,715. Montagu (pop. 15,176) is situated on the northeastern side of the Langeberg at the entrance to the Cogmanskloof gorge, while Ashton (pop. 13,325), the site of the municipal headquarters, is situated on the other side of the mountains at the gorge's exit. Bonnievale (pop. 9,092) is on the Breede River downstream from Robertson and Ashton, and McGregor (pop. 3,125) is south of Robertson in the foothills of the Riviersonderend Mountains.

== History ==
At the end of the apartheid era, the area that is today the Langeberg Municipality formed part of the Breërivier Regional Services Council (RSC). The towns of Robertson, Montagu, Ashton, Bonnievale and McGregor were governed by municipal councils elected by their white residents. The coloured residents of these towns were governed by management committees subordinate to the white councils. Nkqubela and Zolani were governed by town councils established under the Black Local Authorities Act, 1982.

While the negotiations to end apartheid were taking place a process was established for local authorities to agree on voluntary mergers. In January 1993, the Municipality of McGregor and the McGregor Management Committee merged into a single municipal council.

After the national elections of 1994 a process of local government transformation began, in which negotiations were held between the existing local authorities, political parties, and local community organisations. As a result of these negotiations, the existing local authorities were dissolved and transitional local councils (TLCs) were created for each town and village.

- Montagu TLC replaced the Municipality of Montagu and Montagu Management Committee in October 1994.
- Robertson TLC replaced the Municipality of Robertson, Robertson Management Committee and Nkqubela Town Council in November 1994.
- Ashton TLC replaced the Municipality of Ashton, Ashton Management Committee and Zolani Town Council in January 1995.
- Bonnievale TLC replaced the Municipality of Bonnievale and Bonnievale Management Committee in January 1995.
- McGregor TLC replaced the Municipality of McGregor in January 1995.

The transitional councils were initially made up of members nominated by the various parties to the negotiations, until May 1996 when elections were held. At these elections the Breërivier District Council was established, replacing the Breërivier RSC. Transitional representative councils (TRCs) were also elected to represent rural areas outside the TLCs on the District Council; the area that was to become Breede Valley Municipality was covered by the Wynland TRC.

At the local elections of December 2000 the TLCs and TRCs were dissolved and the Breede River/Winelands Municipality was established as a single local authority. At the same election the Breërivier District Council was also dissolved and replaced by the Boland District Municipality. In 2009 it was renamed the Langeberg Municipality. When District Management Areas were abolished in 2011, the boundary of the municipality was extended to include the sparsely populated region northeast of Montagu, which had formerly been part of a DMA.

== Politics ==
The municipal council consists of twenty-three members elected by mixed-member proportional representation. Twelve councillors are elected by first-past-the-post voting in twelve wards, while the remaining eleven are chosen from party lists so that the total number of party representatives is proportional to the number of votes received.

In the election of 4 November 2026 no party won a majority of seats on the council. The Democratic Alliance (DA) obtained a plurality of nine seats.

The following table shows the results of the 2026 election.

Party	Ward			List			Total seats
Party	Votes	%	Seats	Votes	%	Seats	Total seats
Democratic Alliance	9,691	38.85	9	9,948	39.75	0	9
African National Congress	3,878	15.55	1	3,959	15.82	3	4
Patriotic Alliance	3,791	15.20	1	3,685	14.72	3	4
Freedom Front Plus	2,079	8.33	0	2,016	8.05	2	2
Langerberg Independent Party	1,390	5.57	0	1,339	5.35	1	1
Better Zolani	863	3.46	1	911	3.64	0	1
Langeberg First	864	3.46	0	692	2.76	1	1
Langeberg Ratepayers Association	530	2.12	0	581	2.32	1	1
13 other parties	1,860	7.46	0	1,897	7.58	0	0
Total	24,946	100.00	12	25,028	100.00	11	23
Valid votes	24,946	98.29		25,028	98.34		
Invalid/blank votes	435	1.71		423	1.66		
Total votes	25,381	100.00		25,451	100.00		
Registered voters/turnout	48,560	52.27		48,560	52.41		
