= Ashton, South Africa =

Ashton
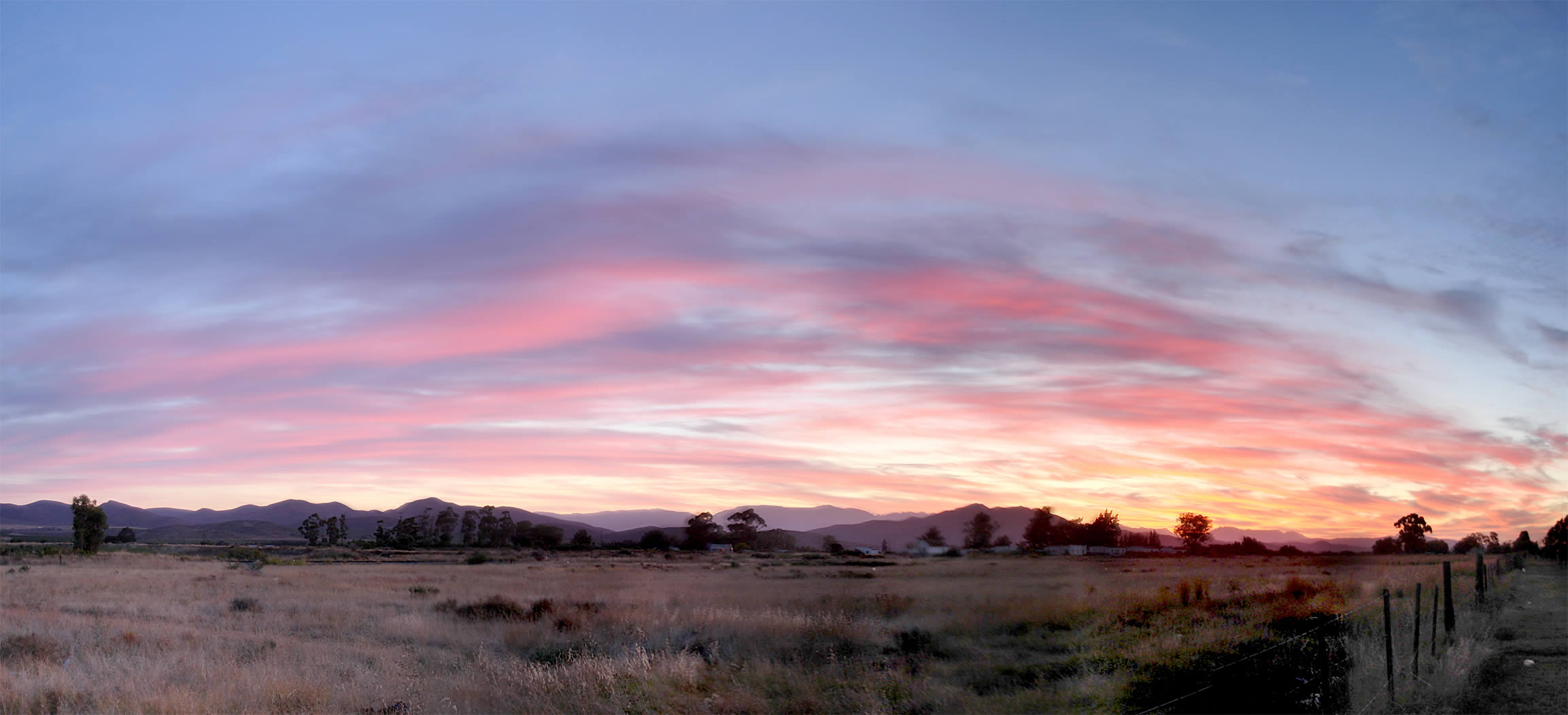
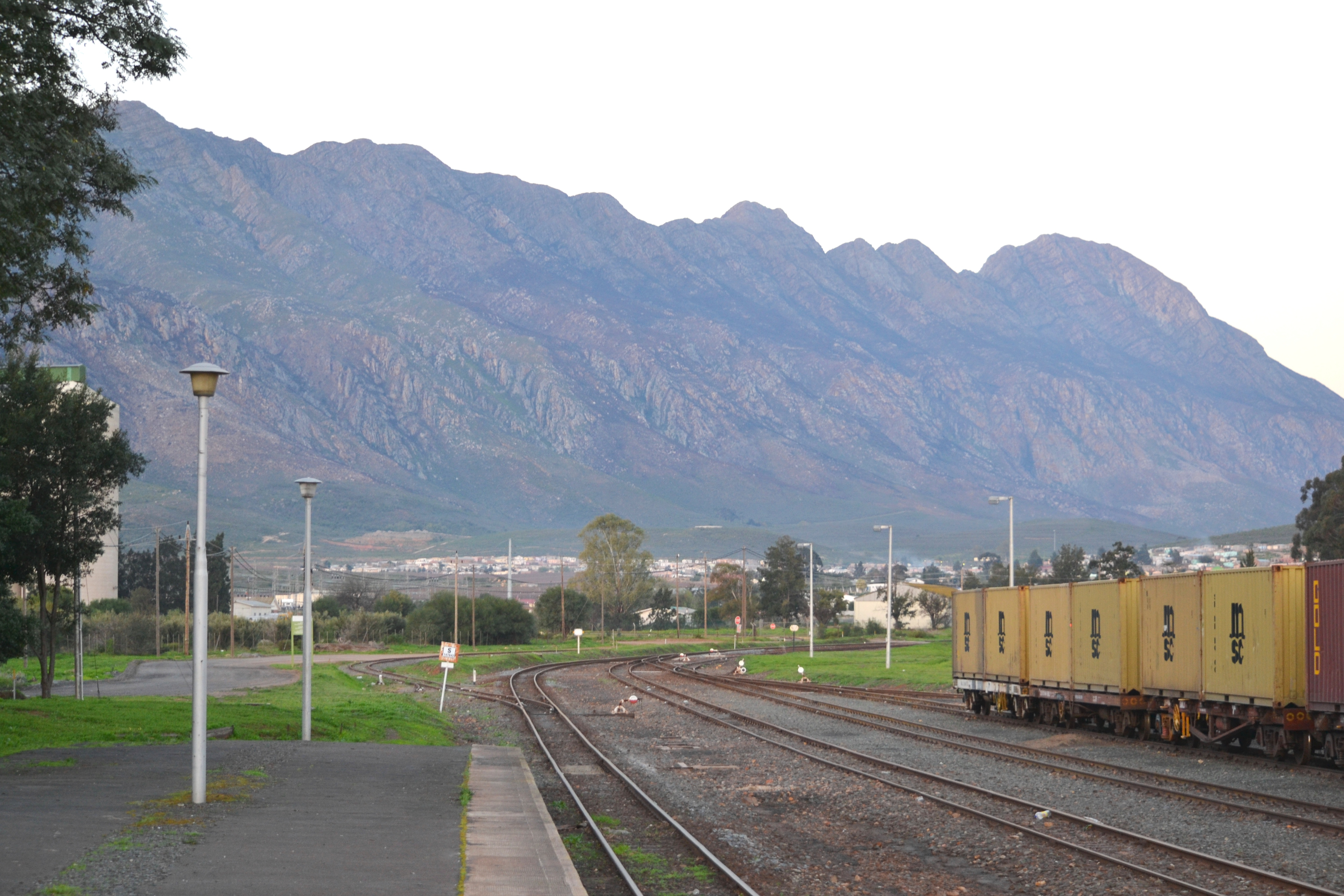
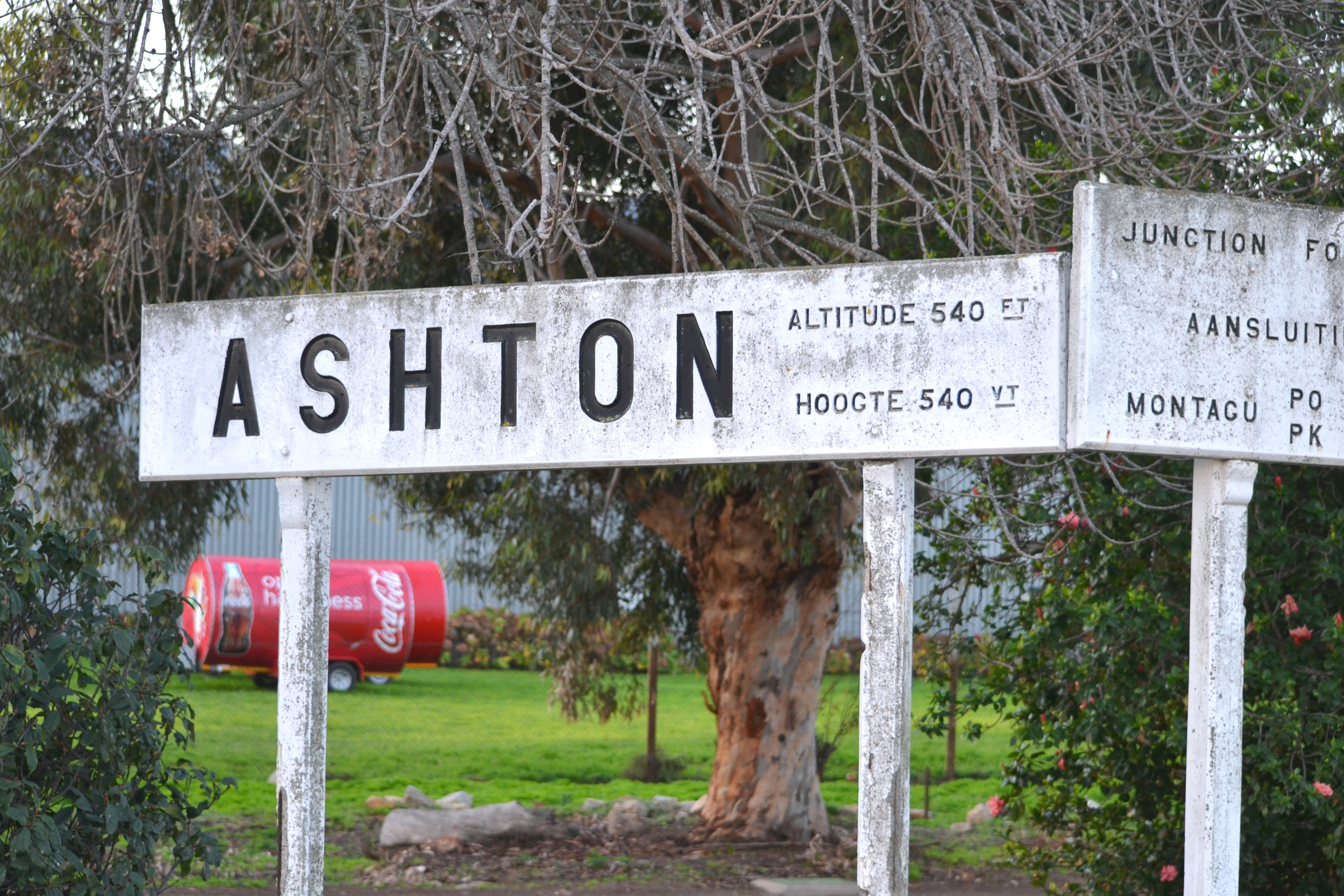
- Clockwise from top: Sunset over Ashton, Ashton Railway sign, Ashton Train Station.

- Location within Western Cape Location within South Africa
- Coordinates: 33°50′5″S 20°3′17″E
- Country: South Africa
- Province: Western Cape
- District: Cape Winelands
- Municipality: Langeberg

Area
  - Total: 23.5 km^{2} (9.1 sq mi)

Population (2011)
  - Total: 13,325
  - Density: 567/km^{2} (1,470/sq mi)

Racial makeup (2011)
  - Black African: 40.9%
  - Coloured: 53.4%
  - Indian/Asian: 0.2%
  - White: 5.0%
  - Other: 0.4%

First languages (2011)
  - Afrikaans: 58.6%
  - Xhosa: 35.7%
  - English: 1.4%
  - Sotho: 1.3%
  - Other: 2.9%
- Time zone: UTC+2 (SAST)
- Postal code (street): 6715
- PO box: 6715
- Area code: 023

Ashton is a small town in the Western Cape in South Africa. The town is at the foot of the Langeberg mountain range, 10 km southwest of Montagu and 19 km east-southeast of Robertson. It is situated in a valley known for production of wines and fruit.

Ashton is known for its canning factory, which has faced economic challenges in recent years. Ashton is also home to various tourist attractions, including vineyards and the Ashton Steam Locomotive.

== History ==
It was established in 1897 on the Roodewal farm and attained municipal status in January 1956. The town was named after the first station-master.
