= McGregor, South Africa =

McGregor
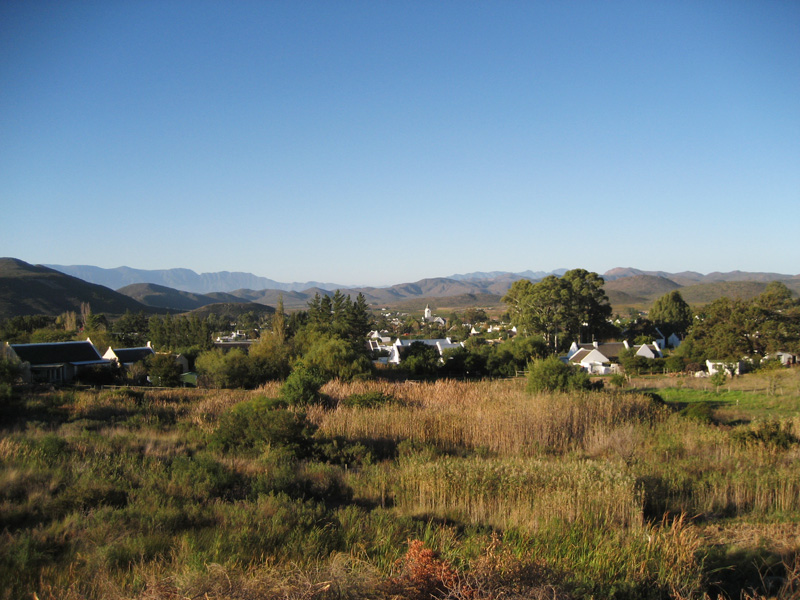
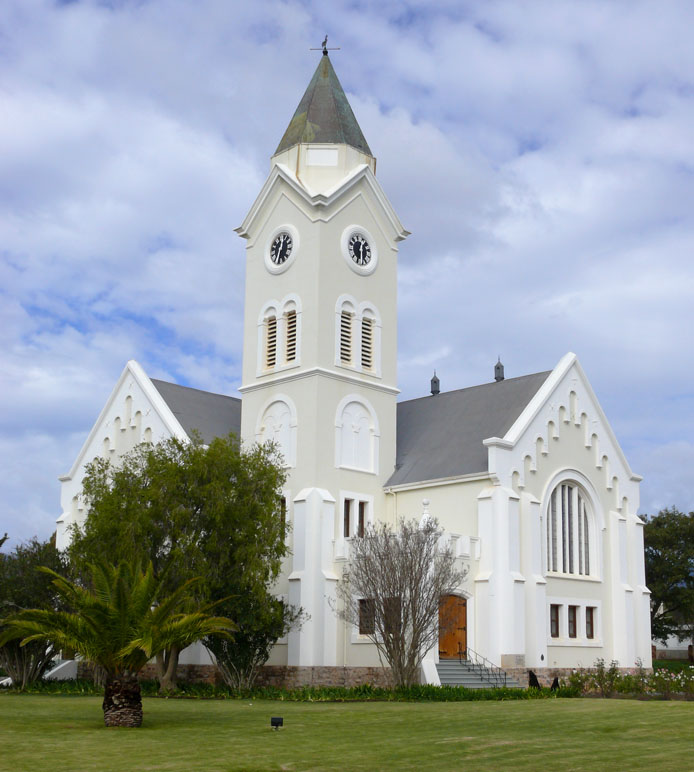
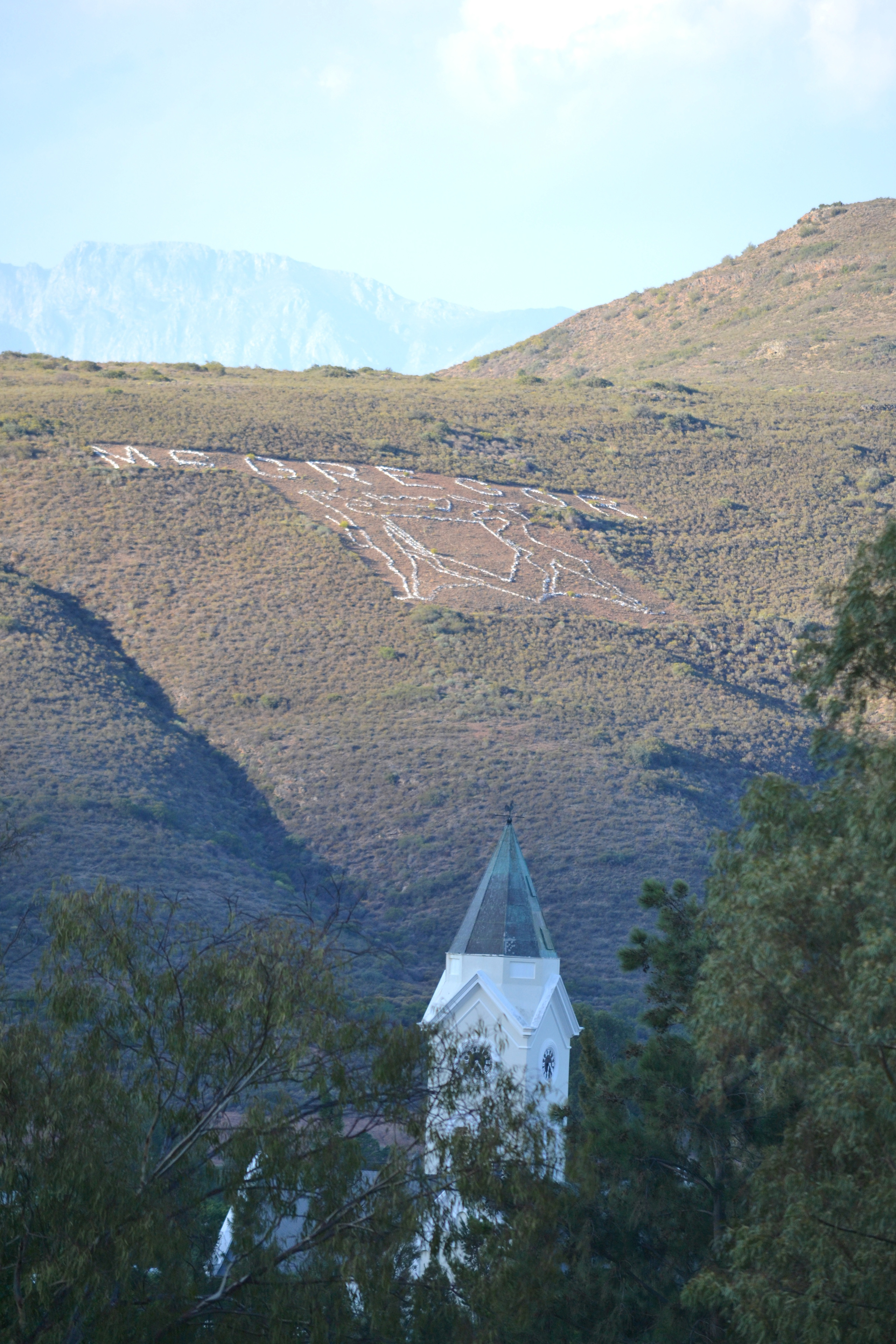
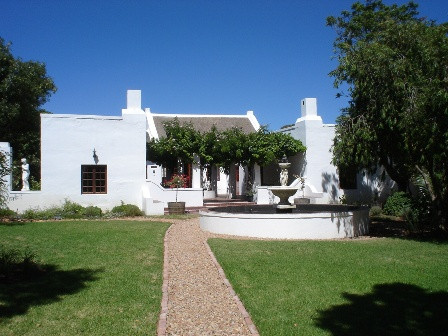
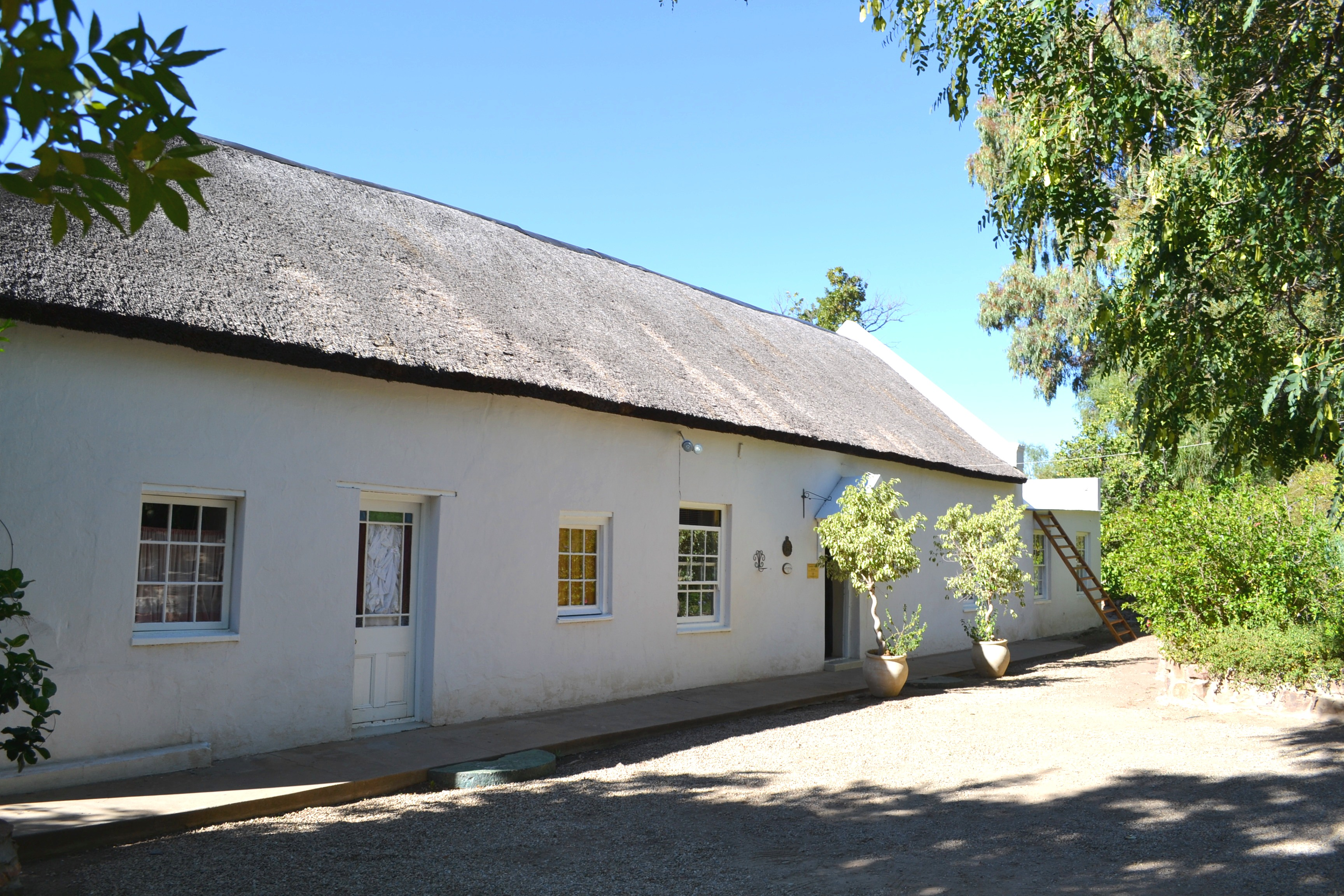
- Clockwise from top: View of McGregor, "McGregor" on the mountain, Old McGregor Mill, Fountain Place, Dutch Reformed Church.

- Location within Western Cape Location within South Africa
- Coordinates: 33°57′S 19°50′E
- Country: South Africa
- Province: Western Cape
- District: Cape Winelands
- Municipality: Langeberg
- Established: 1861

Government
  - Councillor: M.G. Oostendorff-Kraukamp (DA)

Area
  - Total: 22.03 km^{2} (8.51 sq mi)

Population (2011)
  - Total: 3,125
  - Density: 141.9/km^{2} (367.4/sq mi)

Racial makeup (2011)
  - Black African: 3.3%
  - Coloured: 82.8%
  - Indian/Asian: 0.9%
  - White: 12.8%
  - Other: 0.3%

First languages (2011)
  - Afrikaans: 86.6%
  - English: 10.4%
  - Xhosa: 1.3%
  - Other: 1.8%
- Time zone: UTC+2 (SAST)
- Postal code (street): 6708
- Area code: 023
- Website: www.tourismmcgregor.co.za www.mcgregorvillage.co.za

McGregor is a small village in the mountains of the Western Cape, South Africa. It is roughly 150 km east of Cape Town. It is located in Ward 5 of the Langeberg Municipality. According to the Census 2001, this Ward has a population of 10,254 people (Stats SA, 2001).

The village was established in 1861 and was originally called Lady Grey. It was renamed in 1905 in honour of Rev. Andrew McGregor, who had been the Dutch Reformed Church minister of the Robertson District for forty years. It has become somewhat of a magnet for alternative lifestyles. The local Waldorf school has roughly 167 children. It is part of the broader wine route network of the Western Cape and is situated at one end of the popular Boesmanskloof Trail to the town of Greyton to the south.

The village irrigation system dates back many years. The edge of the streets have a water channel fed from the town dam. Each landowner has a slot allocated during the week where they get a few minutes to an hour of the channel flowing into their property, with the time allocated being a function of the size of the property. In recent years some controversy has arisen due to the reduction of the roster to every second week in an effort to keep a fuller dam. However, during the summer of 2012/13 extensive work has been undertaken to rebuild the dam and to prevent its main wall from leaking and it is now (June 2013) hoped that this will solve the problems.

It is home to the annual Poetry in McGregor festival.
