= Robertson, South Africa =

Robertson
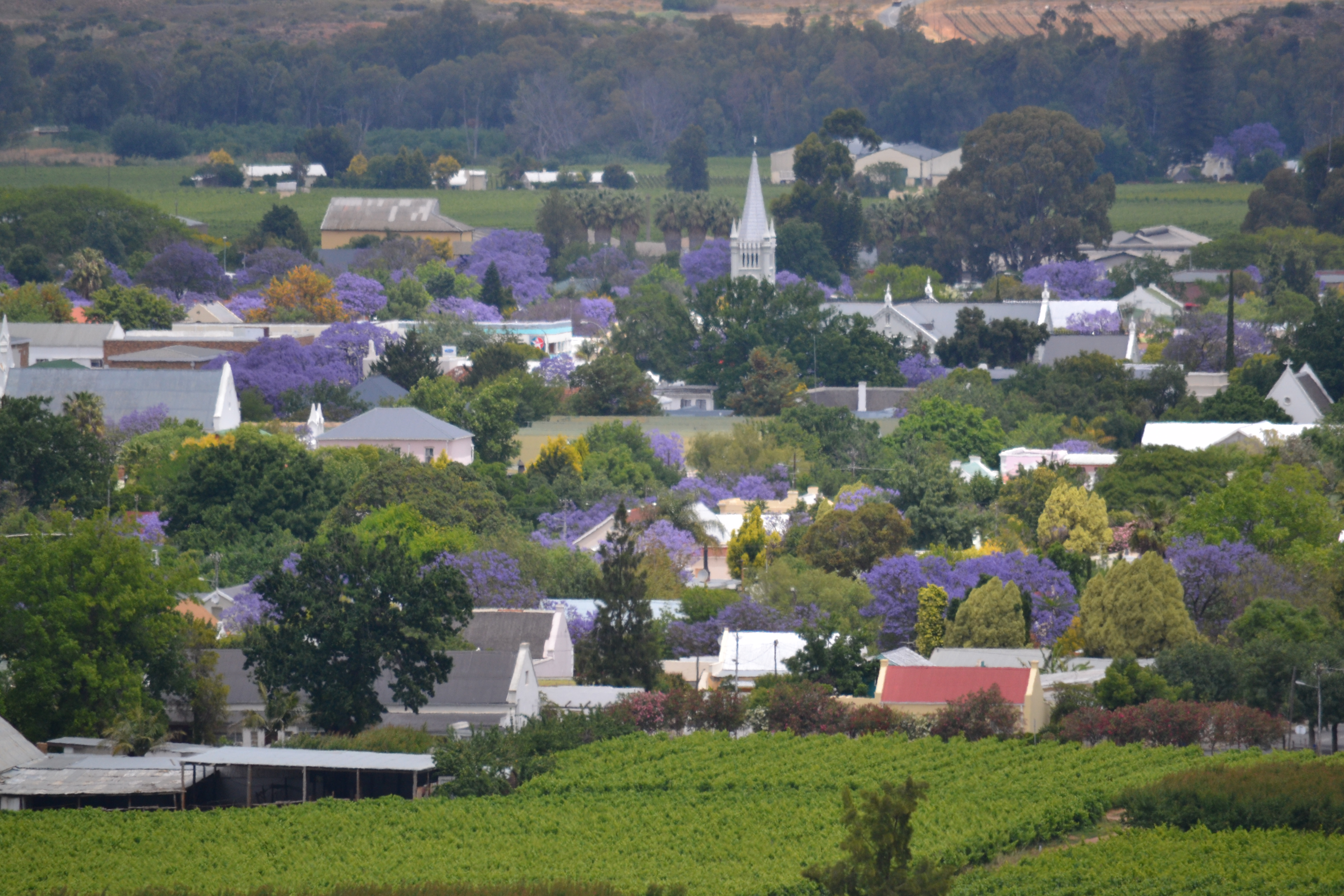
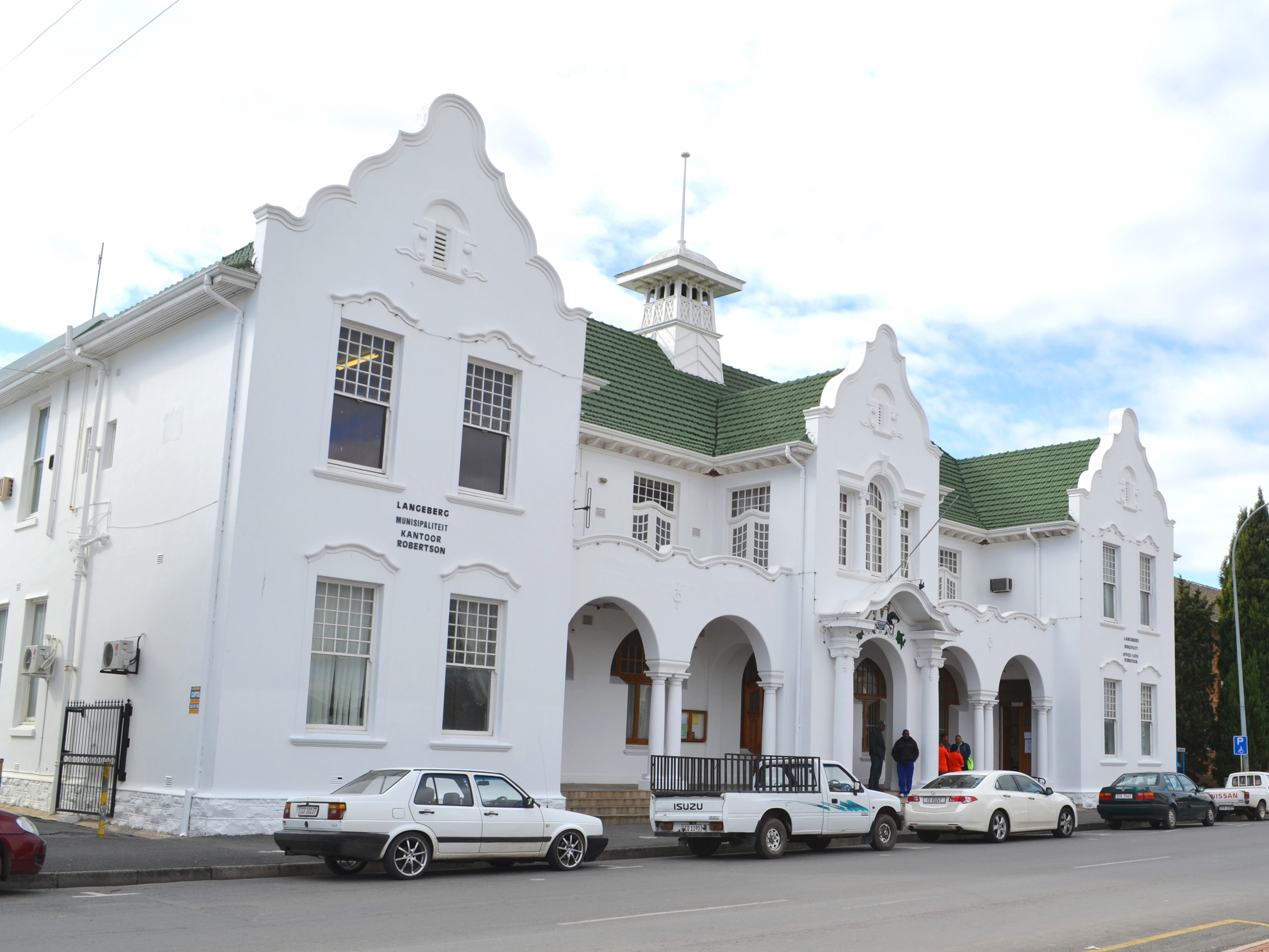
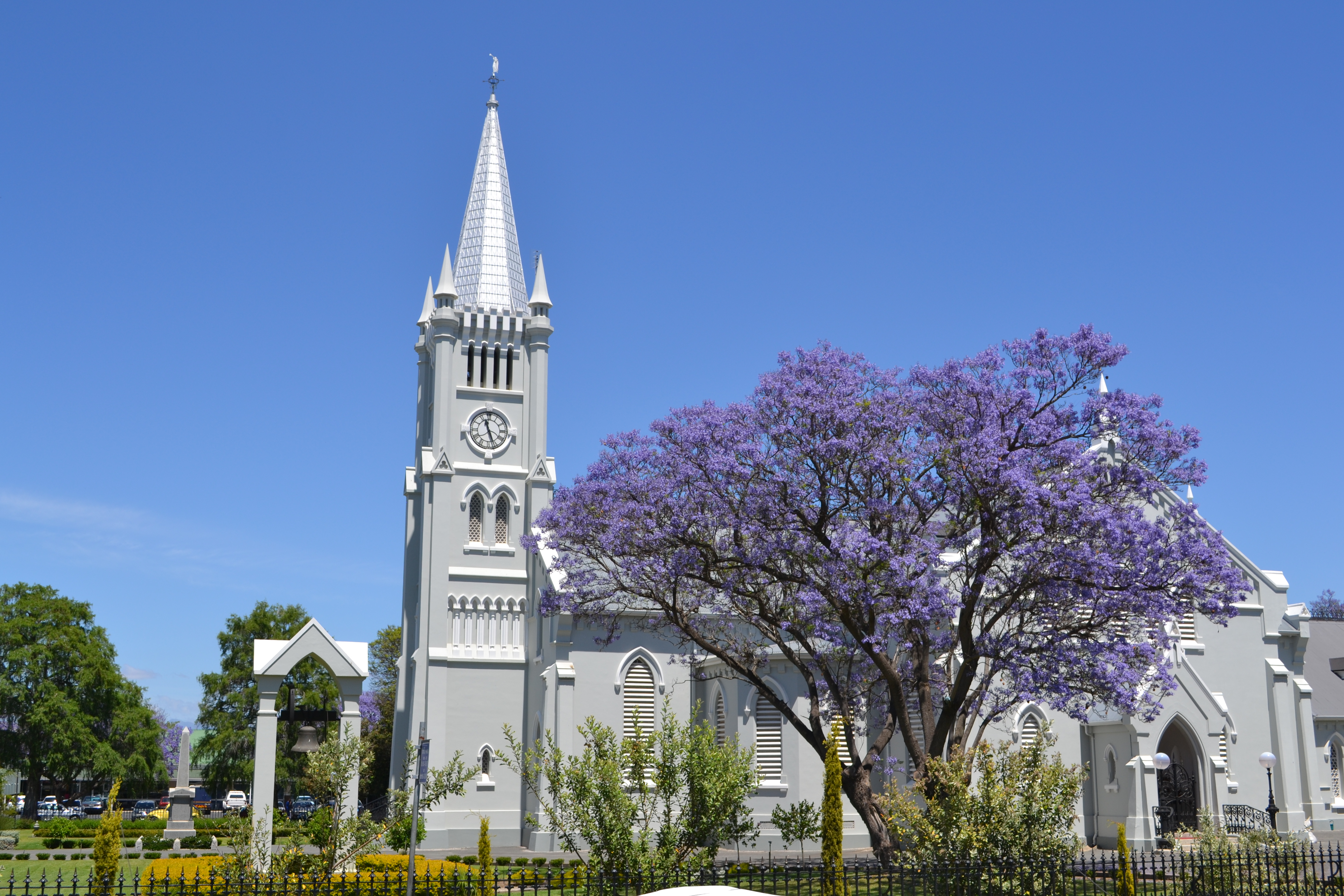
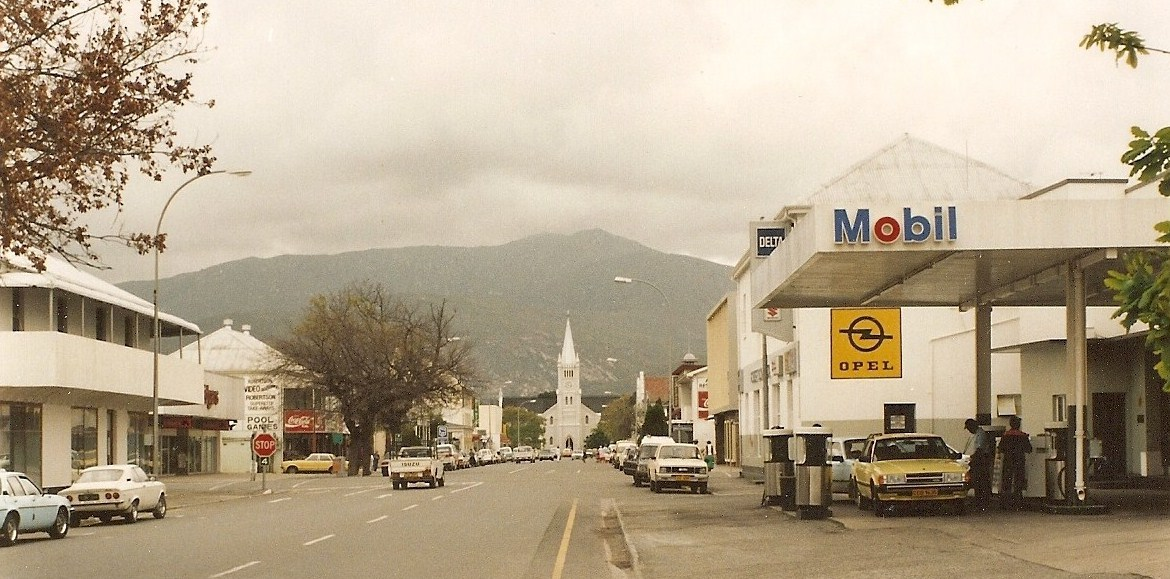
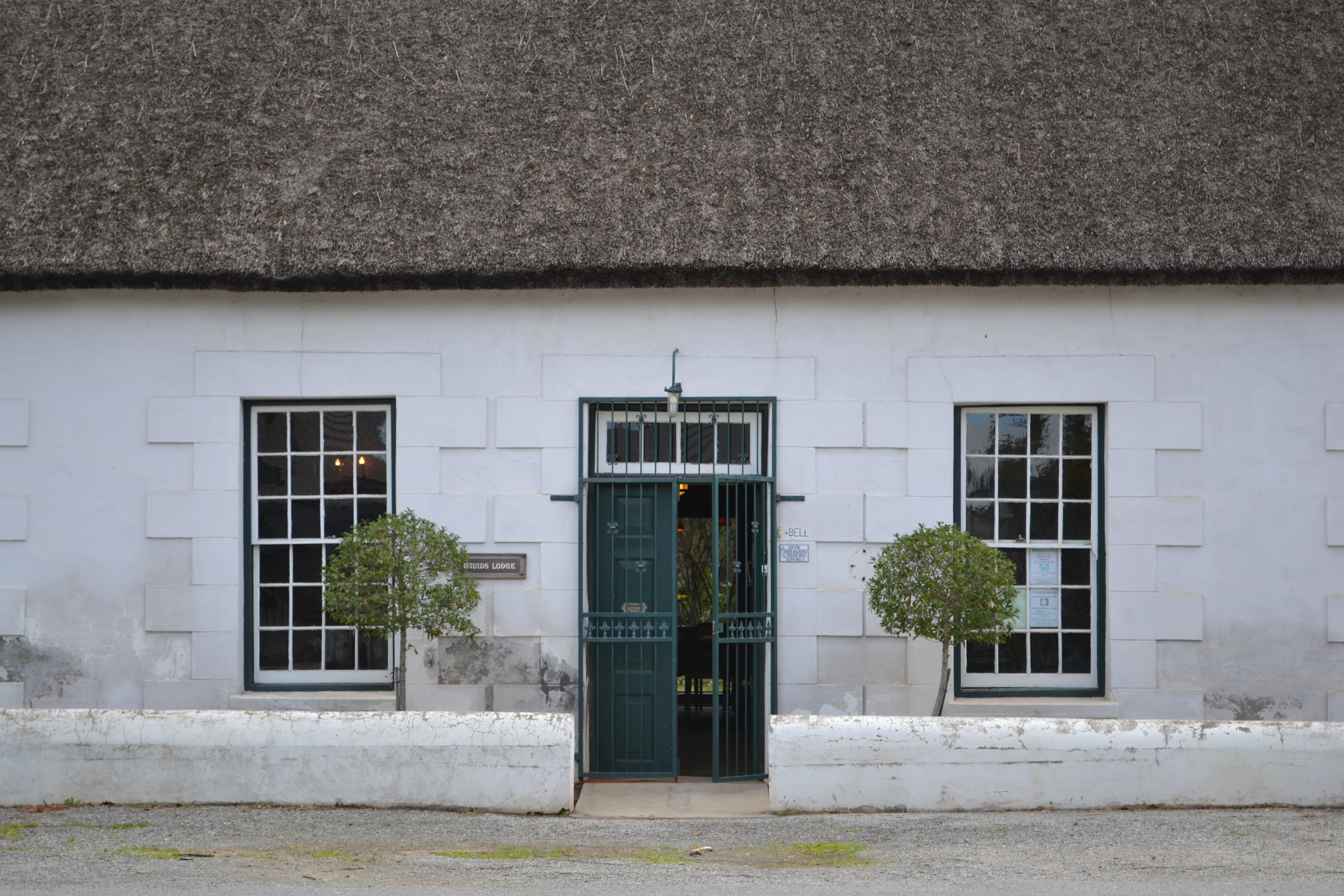
- Clockwise from top: View of Robertson, Dutch Reformed Church, Druid's Lodge, Robertson in 1987, Robertson Town Hall

- Location within Western Cape Location within South Africa Location within Africa
- Coordinates: 33°48′S 19°53′E
- Country: South Africa
- Province: Western Cape
- District: Cape Winelands
- Municipality: Langeberg
- Established: 1853

Government
  - Councillor: C. Steyn (DA)

Area
  - Total: 21.2 km^{2} (8.2 sq mi)

Population (2011)
  - Total: 9,355
  - Density: 441/km^{2} (1,140/sq mi)

Racial makeup (2011)
  - Black African: 7.1%
  - Coloured: 48.3%
  - Indian/Asian: 0.5%
  - White: 42.5%
  - Other: 1.6%

First languages (2011)
  - Afrikaans: 89.3%
  - Xhosa: 0.9%
  - English: 7.1%
  - Other: 2.7%
- Time zone: UTC+2 (SAST)
- Postal code (street): 6705
- PO box: 6705
- Area code: 023
- Website: robertsonr62.com

Robertson is a town in the Western Cape Province of South Africa, known as the valley of wine and roses, at the heart of the wine route - Route 62.

Founded in 1853 and named after Dr William Robertson, a Scottish Dutch Reformed Church minister.

Situated in the fertile Robertson Valley, farming and wagon building were the town's original industries. However, after the Second Anglo-Boer War of 1899, the wagon building industry collapsed when the railways took over the transport of all goods.

Robertson subsequently became famous for its ostrich farming, but this industry collapsed as well shortly after World War I, and the farmers of the area turned to wine and fruit farming. Later, several successful racehorse stud farms were founded. Agriculture remains the mainstay of the town's economy.

== Tourism ==
Tourism has grown in recent years and the town has several Western Cape provincial heritage sites, such as the Pink Church (1859), the Museum (1860), the Edwardian-style house 12 Piet Retief Street (1904), the Victorian-style house at 59 Van Reenen Street (1914), and the Powder House (used as a store for gunpowder).

Robertson has a population of over 20,000 civilians

== Skydiving at Robertson ==
Western Province Sport Parachute Club (WPSPC) - Skydive Robertson, founded in 1972, is the oldest remaining skydiving club in South Africa. In July 2008, the club relocated to Robertson.

WPSPC operates from Robertson Airfield on weekends and public holidays and facilitates tandem skydiving and student training, and provides a facility for sports skydivers.

The 2011 South African National Skydiving Championships was hosted by Skydive Robertson and held at Robertson Airfield. This is the first time the national skydiving championships has been held in the Western Cape.

== Robertson Airfield ==
Robertson Airfield is an unmanned airfield, with a 1 600 meter asphalt runway, situated 1 km to the east of Robertson.

== Gallery ==
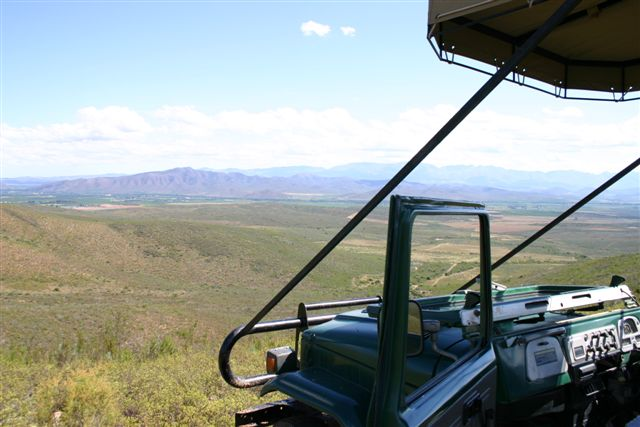
The Klaasvoogds valley from a 4x4 on the Pat Busch Private Nature Reserve, Robertson Pat Busch Private Nature Reserve

The Rosendal Winery & Wellness Retreat in Klaasvoogds, Robertson

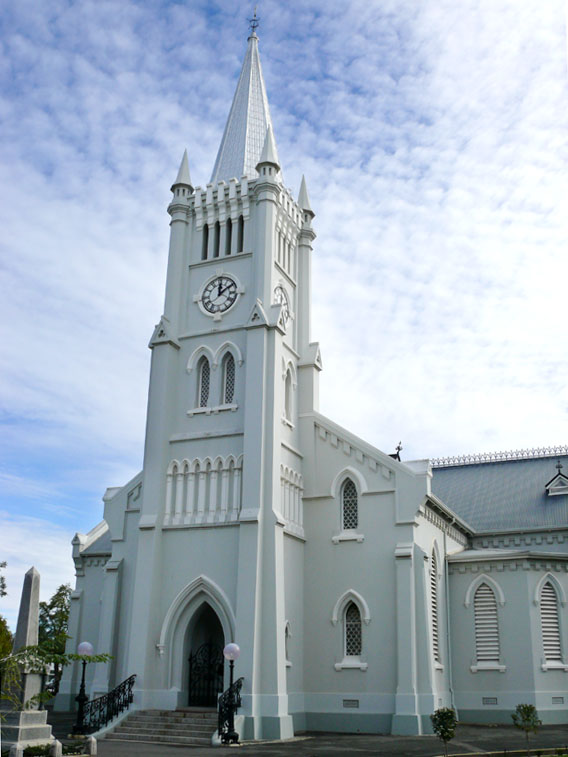
The Dutch Reformed Church
