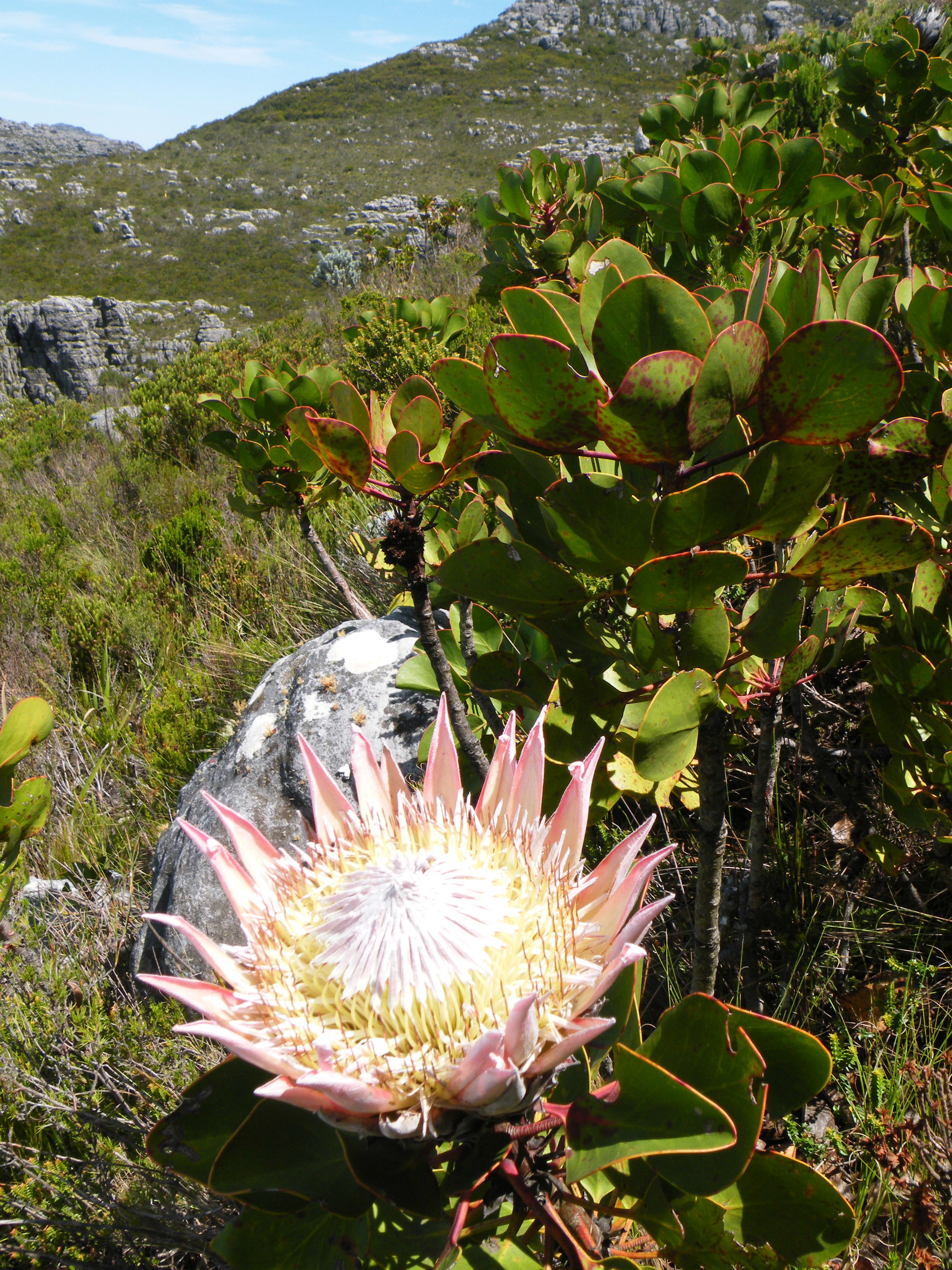

Conservation status
- Least Concern (IUCN 3.1)

Scientific classification
- Kingdom: Plantae
- Clade: Tracheophytes
- Clade: Angiosperms
- Clade: Eudicots
- Order: Proteales
- Family: Proteaceae
- Genus: Protea
- Species: P. cynaroides

Binomial name
- Protea cynaroides (L.) L.
- IUCN range Extant (resident)
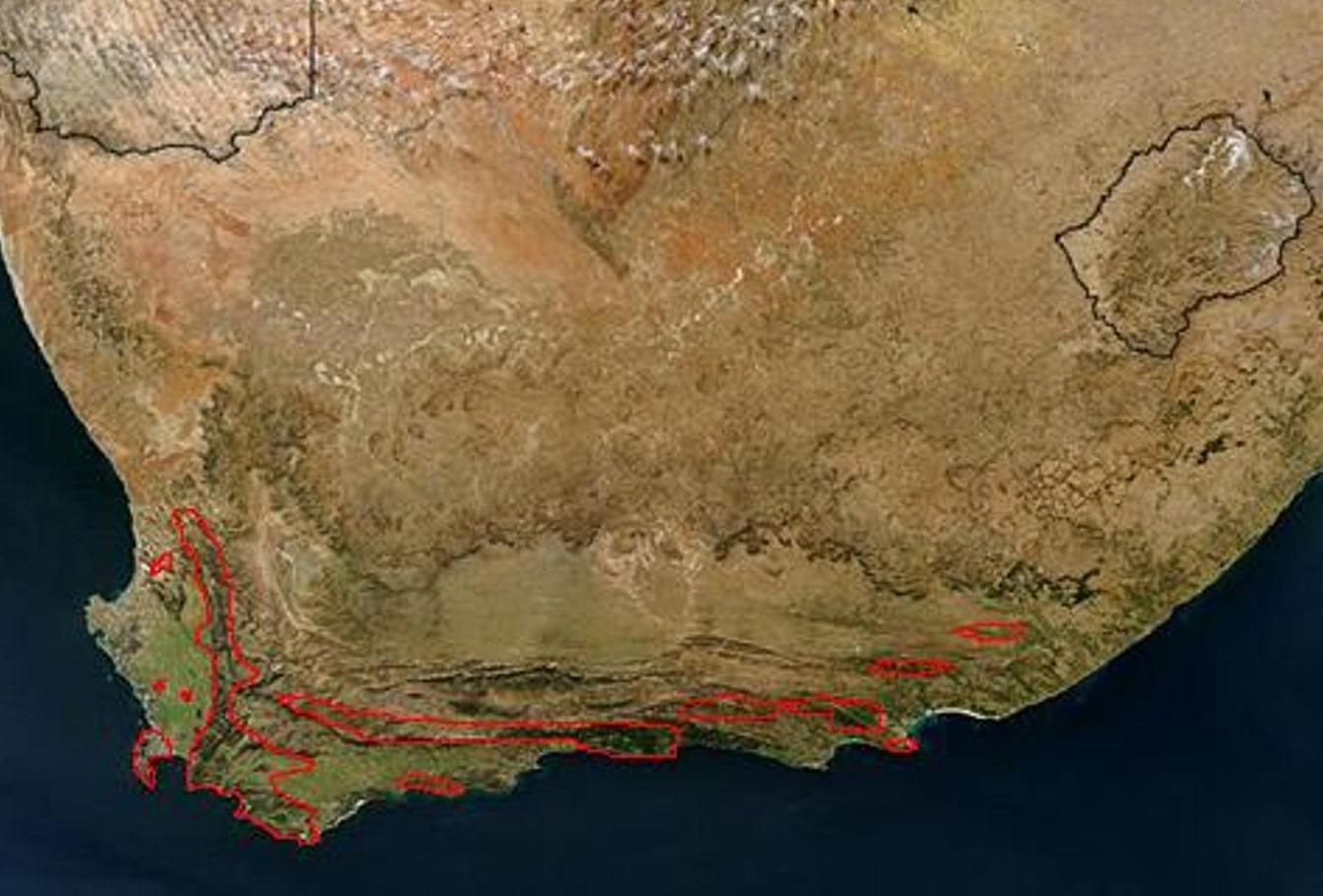

Synonyms
- Scolymocephalus cynaroides (L.) Kuntze; Erodendrum cynariflorum Knight; Protea cyclophylla (Gand.) Gand. & Schinz; Protea eriolepis (Gand.) Gand. & Schinz; Protea petiolata H.Buek ex Meisn.; Protea woodwardii Endl.

= Protea cynaroides =

Species of flowering plant

Protea cynaroides, also called the king protea (from Afrikaans: koningsprotea, Xhosa: isiQwane sobukumkani, Zulu: isiQalaba), is a flowering plant. It is a distinctive member of Protea, having the largest flower head in the genus. The species is also known as giant protea, honeypot, or king sugar bush. It is widely distributed in the fynbos region of South Africa, that is, in the southwestern and southern parts of Western Cape. The king protea is the national flower of South Africa.

Protea cynaroides is adapted to survive wildfires by its thick underground stem, which contains many dormant buds; these will produce the new growth after the fire.

== Taxonomy ==
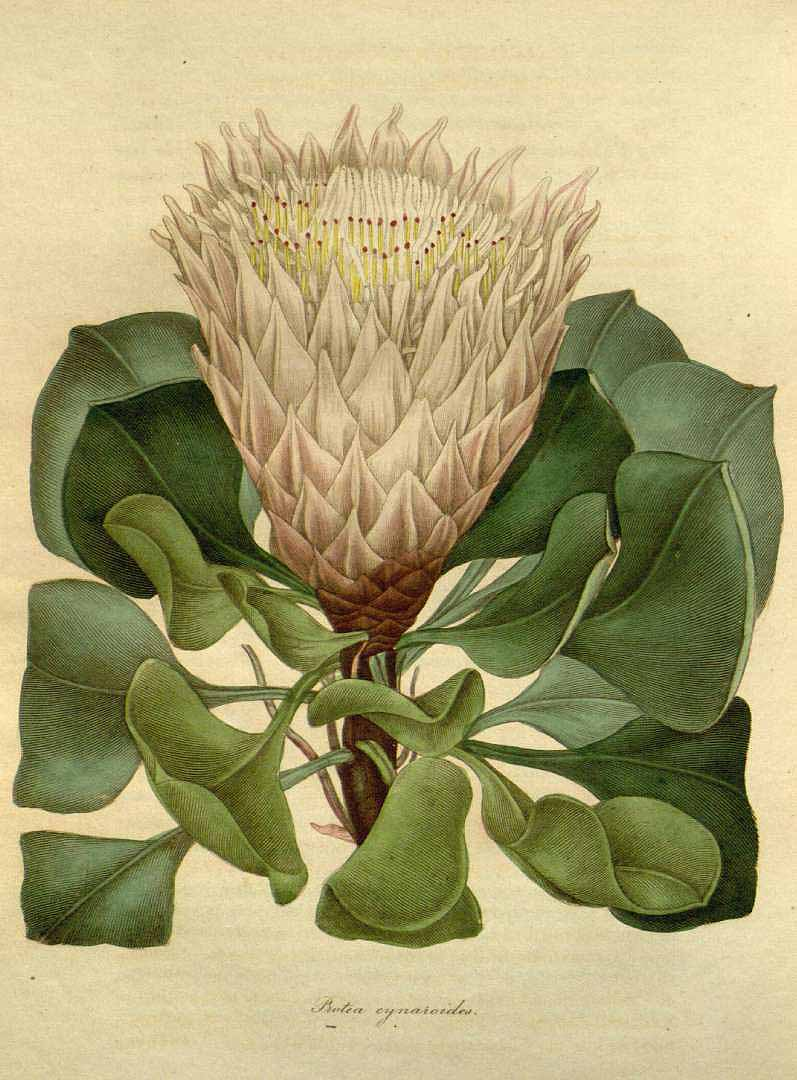
Protea cynaroides from The botanist, vol. 4: t. 166 (1840)

Protea cynaroides is a species of Protea in the huge family Proteaceae. The family comprises about 80 genera with about 1,600 species. It has Gondwanan distribution, which means that it is mainly spread across the Southern Hemisphere, from Southern Africa, across to Australia, to South America, although certain species are also found in equatorial Africa, India, southern Asia, and Oceania.

Protea cynaroides is further placed within the subfamily Proteoideae, which is found mainly in Southern Africa. This subfamily is defined as those species having cluster roots, solitary ovules and indehiscent fruits. Proteoideae is further divided into four tribes: Conospermeae, Petrophileae, Proteae, and Leucadendreae. The genus Protea, and hence P. cynaroides, is placed under the tribe Proteae.

=== Etymology and other names ===
The name of the plant family Proteaceae as well as the genus Protea, both to which P. cynaroides belongs to, derive from the name of the Greek god Proteus, a deity that was able to change between many forms. This is an appropriate image, seeing as both the family and the genus are known for their astonishing variety and diversity of flowers and leaves.

The specific epithet cynaroides refers to the artichoke-like appearance of the flower-heads: the artichoke belongs to the genus Cynara.

It is also known as the king protea, giant protea, honeypot, or king sugar bush.

== Distribution ==
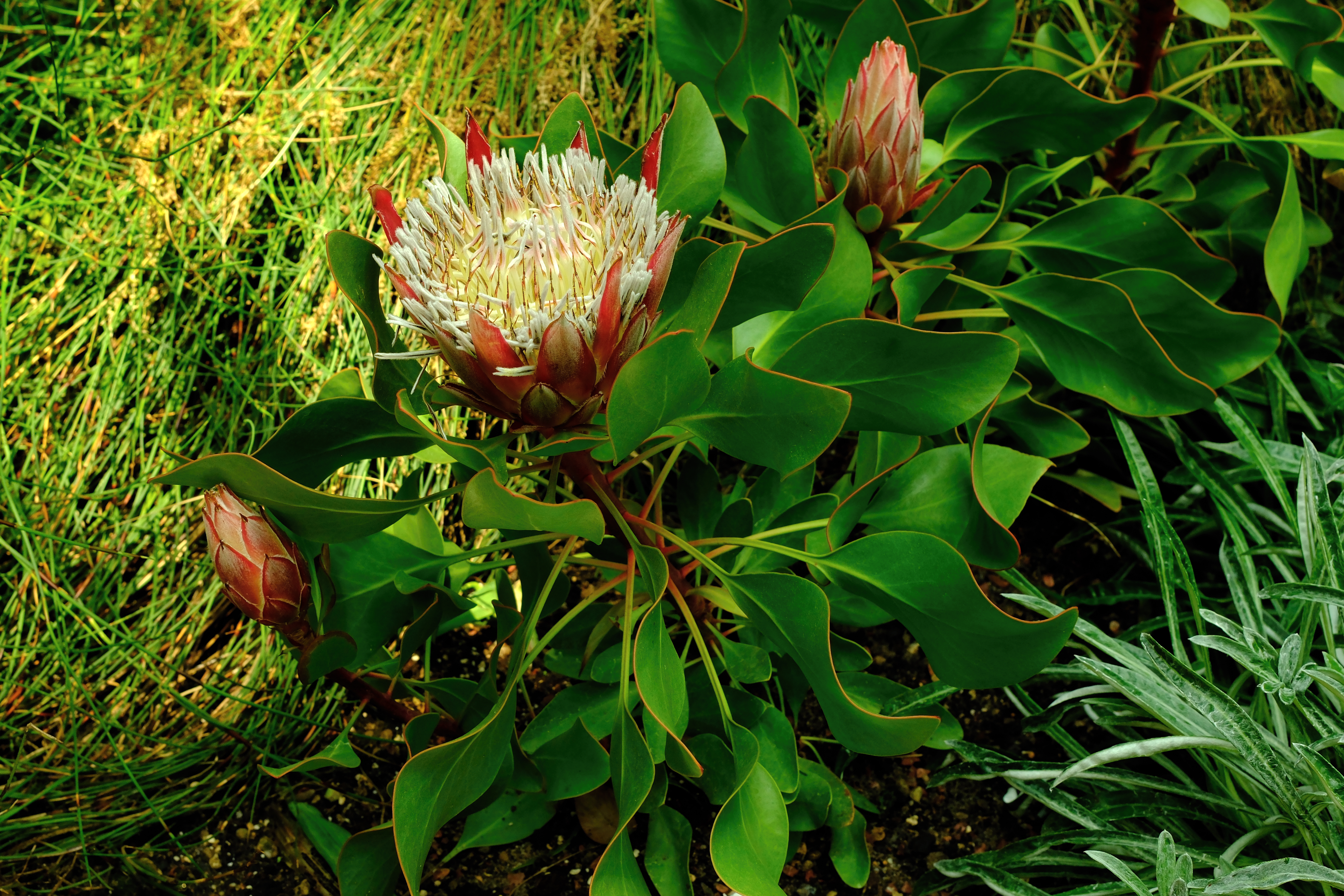
King Sugar Bush plant

The king protea is widely distributed in the southwestern and southern parts of Western Cape.

== Description ==
P. cynaroides is a woody shrub with thick stems and large dark green, glossy leaves. Most plants are one metre in height when mature, but may vary according to locality and habitat from 0.35 to 2 metres (1 ft 2 in to 6 ft 7 in) in height. The "flowers" of P. cynaroides are actually composite flower heads (termed an inflorescence) with a collection of flowers in the centre, surrounded by large colourful bracts, from about 120 to 300 millimetres (5 to 12 in) in diameter. Large, vigorous plants produce six to ten flower heads in one season, although some exceptional plants can produce up to forty flower heads on one plant. The colour of the bracts varies from a creamy white to a deep crimson, but the soft pale pink bracts with a silvery sheen are the most prized.

== Research ==
The diploid chromosome count is 2n = 24. The genome of king protea has been sequenced and published in 2022, corresponding to the first genome sequenced in the Proteales order.

== Ecology ==
Protea cynaroides grows in a harsh environment with dry, hot summers and wet, cold winters. Several adaptions include tough, leathery leaves, which helps to prevent excessive loss of moisture, and a large taproot which penetrates deep into the soil to reach underground moisture. Like most other Proteaceae, P. cynaroides has proteoid roots, roots with dense clusters of short lateral rootlets that form a mat in the soil just below the leaf litter. These enhance solubilisation of nutrients, thus allowing nutrient uptake in the low-nutrient, phosphorus-deficient soils of its native fynbos habitat.

The flowers are fed at by a range of nectarivorous birds, mainly sunbirds and sugarbirds, including the orange-breasted sunbird (Anthobaphes violacea), southern double-collared sunbird (Cinnyris chalybeus), malachite sunbird (Nectarinia famosa), and the Cape sugarbird (Promerops cafer). In order to reach the nectar, the bird must push its bill into the inflorescence. As it does so, its bill and face gets brushed with pollen, thereby allowing for possible pollination.

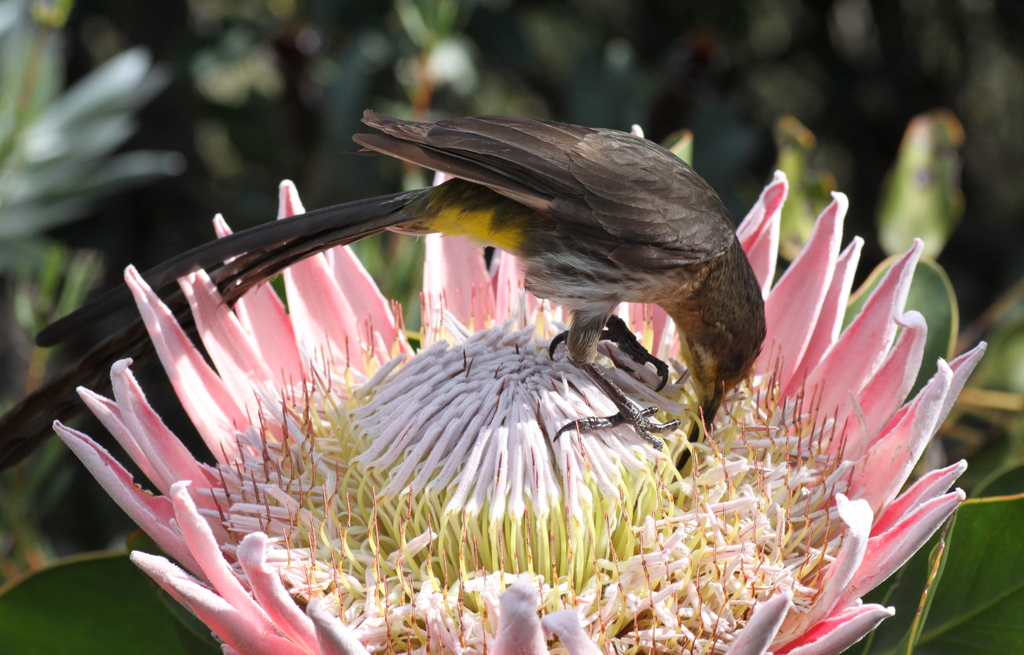
A Cape sugarbird feeding from the flower

Along with birds, a host of insects are attracted to the flowerhead, such as bees, for example the Cape honeybee, and various beetle species, such as rove beetles and the beetles of the huge family Scarabaeidae such as the protea beetle Trichostetha fascicularis and monkey beetles.

Like many other Protea species, P. cynaroides is adapted to an environment in which bushfires are essential for reproduction and regeneration. Most Protea species can be placed in one of two broad groups according to their response to fire: reseeders are killed by fire, but fire also triggers the release of their canopy seed bank, thus promoting recruitment of the next generation; resprouters survive fire, resprouting from a lignotuber or, more rarely, epicormic buds protected by thick bark. P. cynaroides is a resprouter as it shoots up new stems from buds in its thick underground stem after a fire.

== Significance and uses ==
The king protea is the national flower of South Africa and as such lends its name to the national cricket team, whose nickname is the Proteas. In the early 1990s, there was a political debate as to if and how the flower should be incorporated onto the national rugby team's shirts, replacing the springbok.

The king protea is also the flagship of the Protea Atlas Project, run by the South African National Botanical Institute.

The flower has a long vase life in flower arrangements, and air dries well makes preserving the flower for decoration. It has several colour forms, and horticulturists have recognised 81 garden varieties, some of which have injudiciously been planted in its natural range. In some varieties the pink of the flower and red borders of leaves are replaced by a creamy yellow.

== Gallery ==
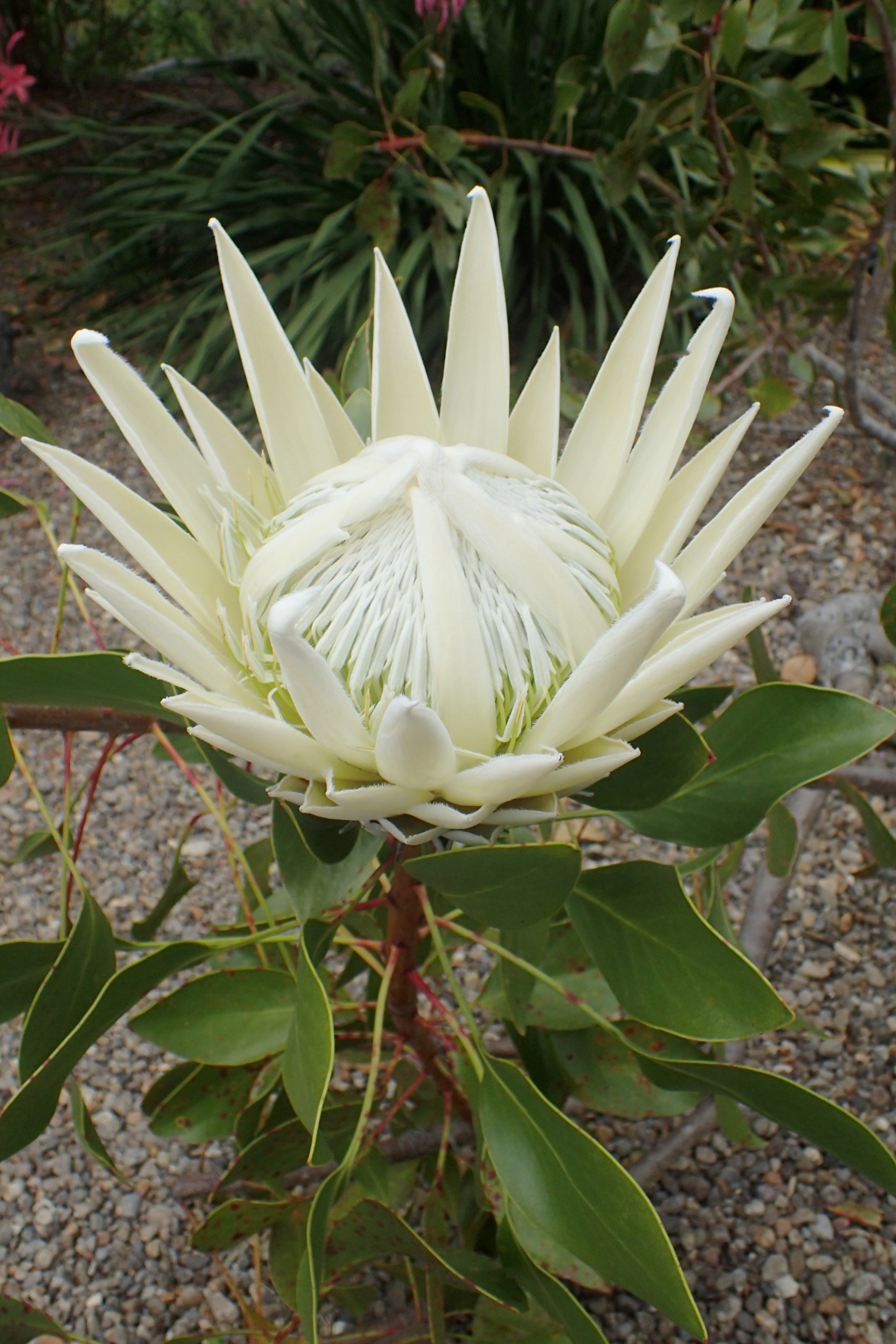
Protea cynaroides 'Arctic Ice', a white cultivar

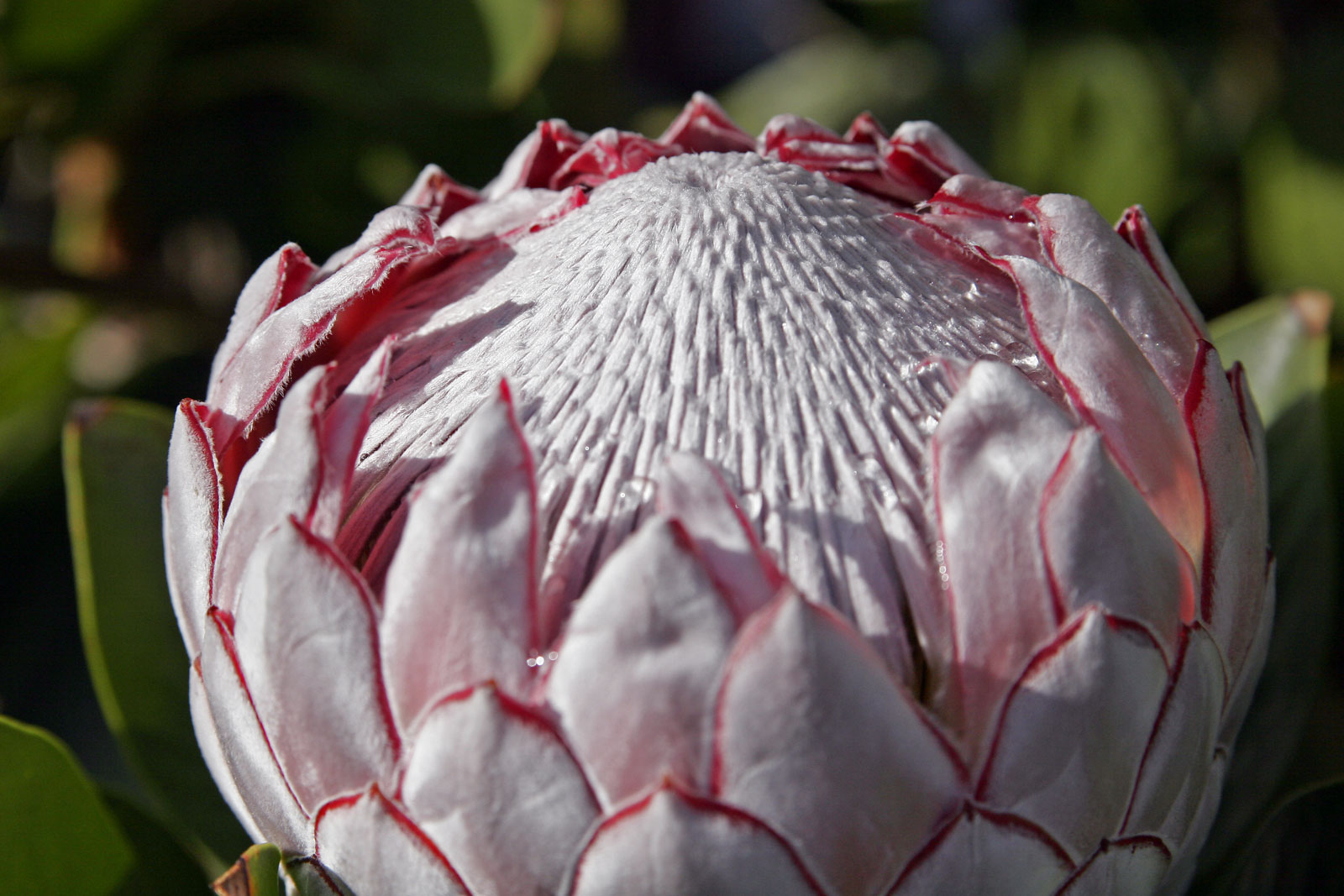

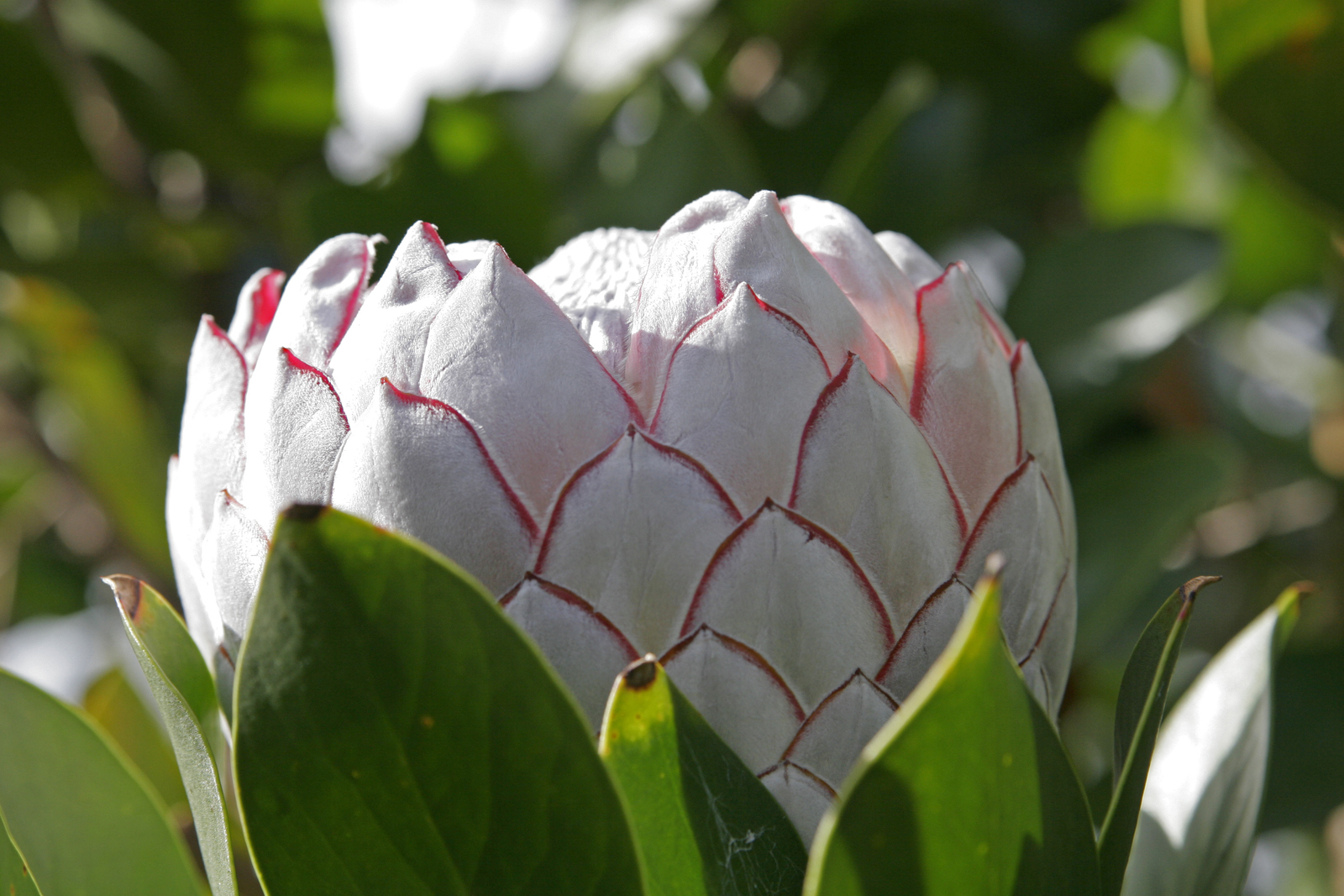

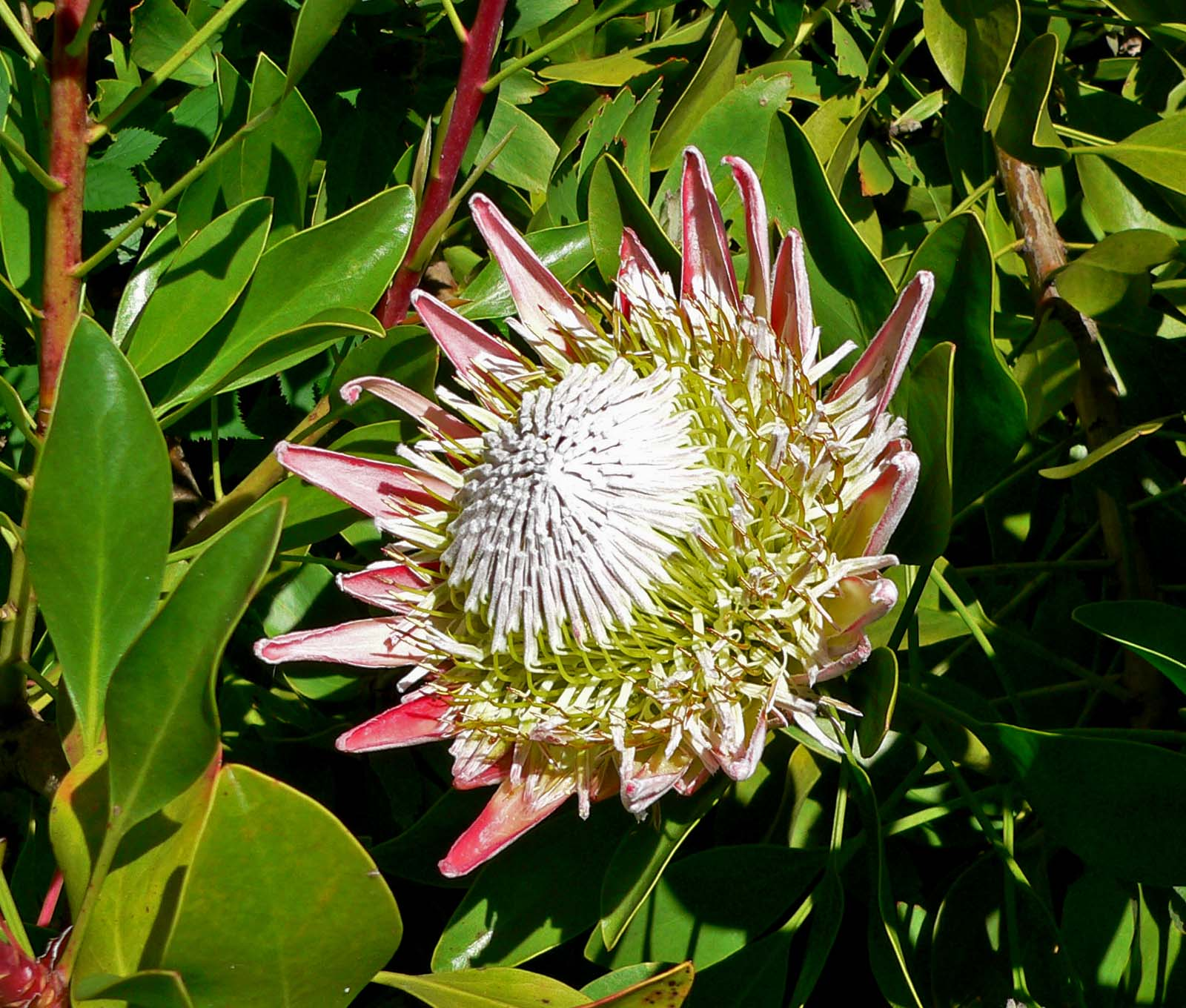

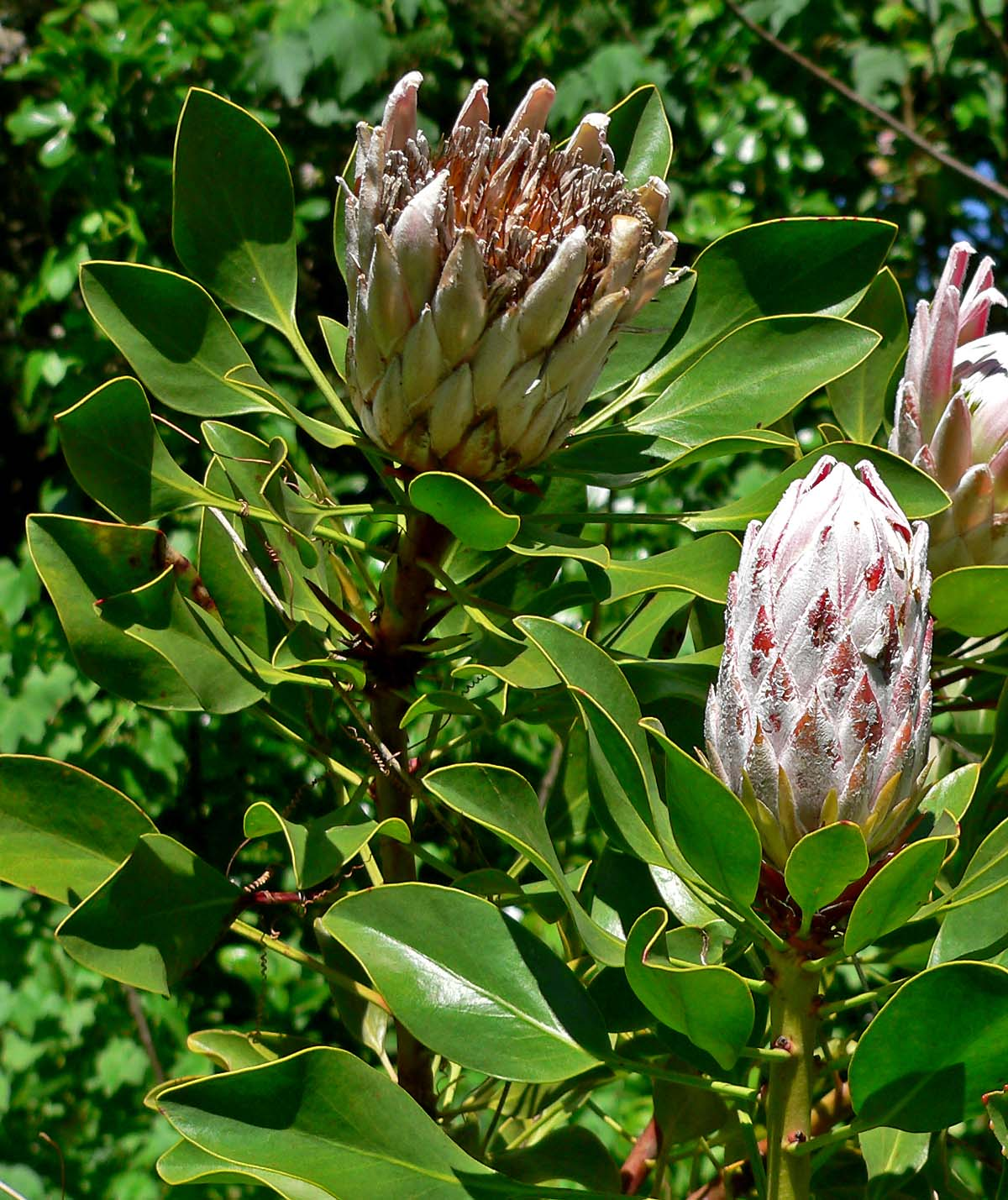

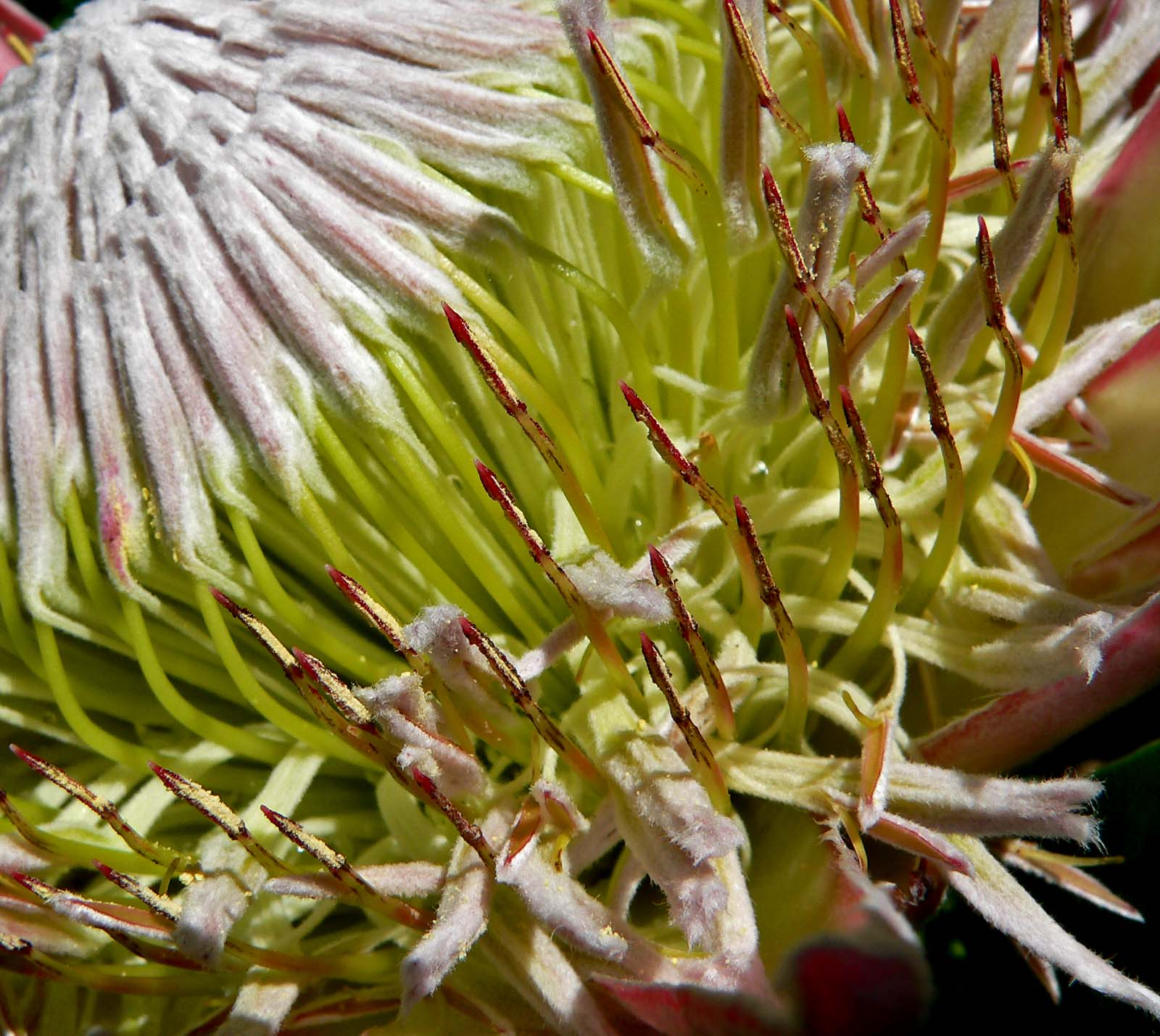

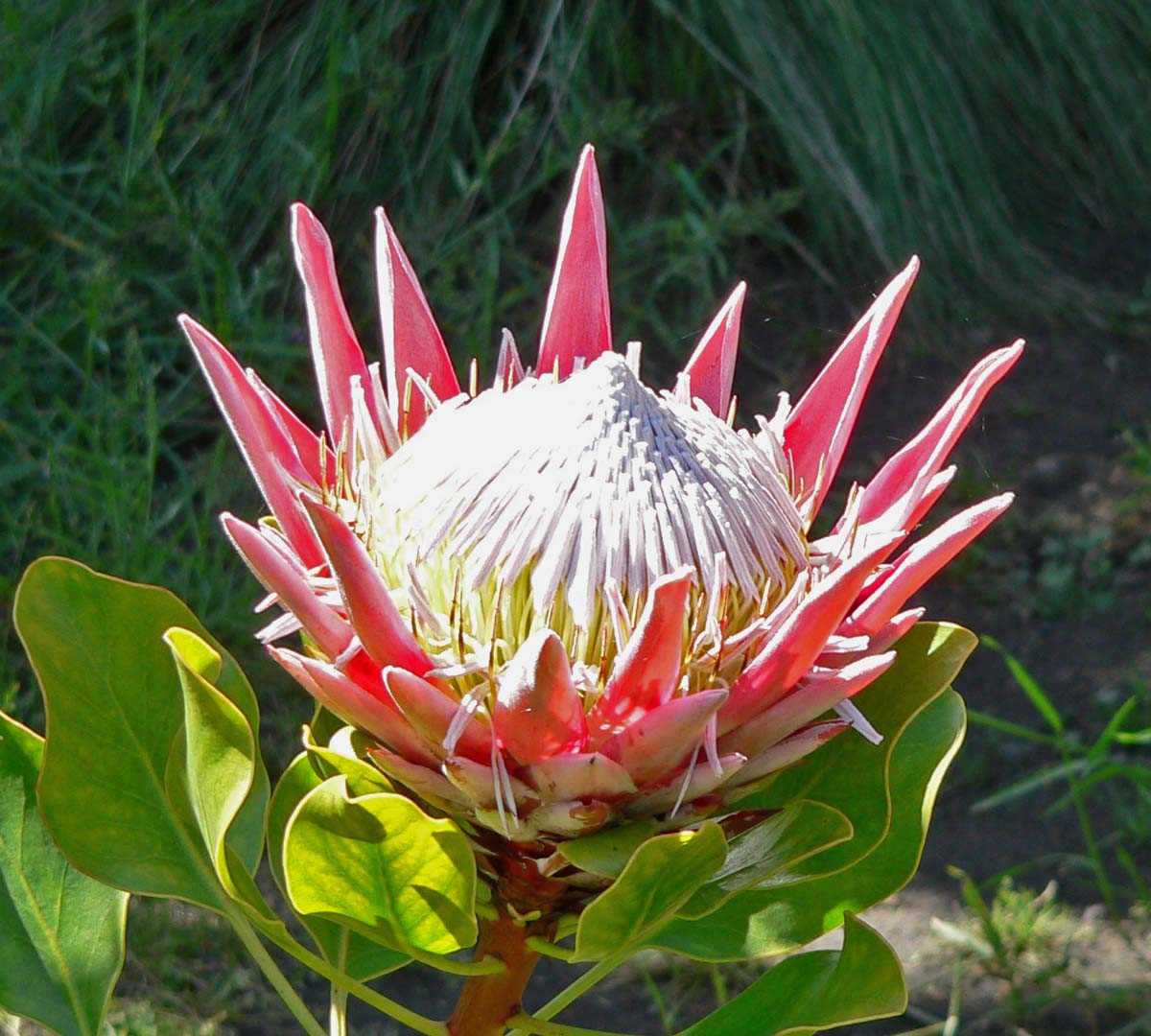

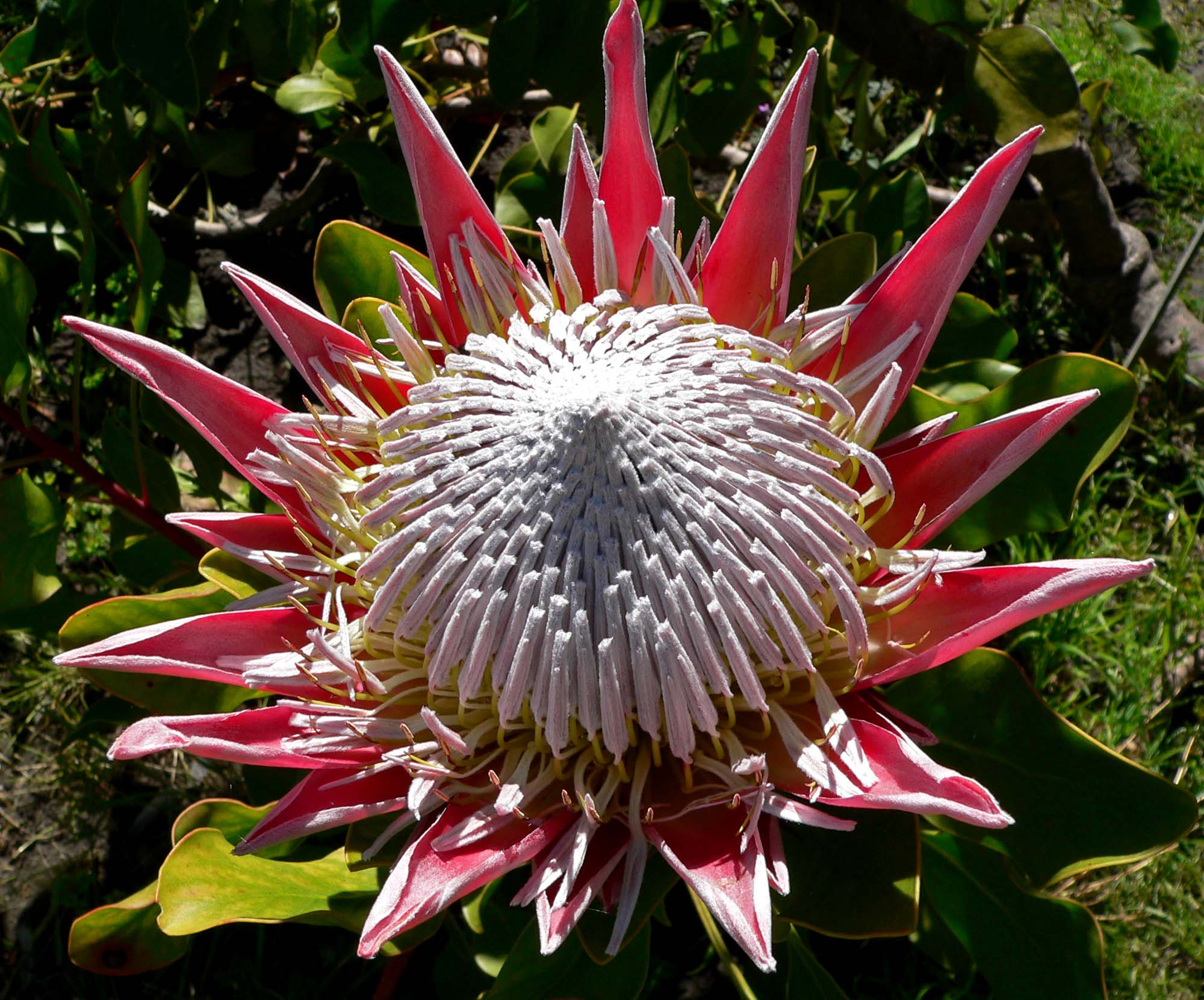

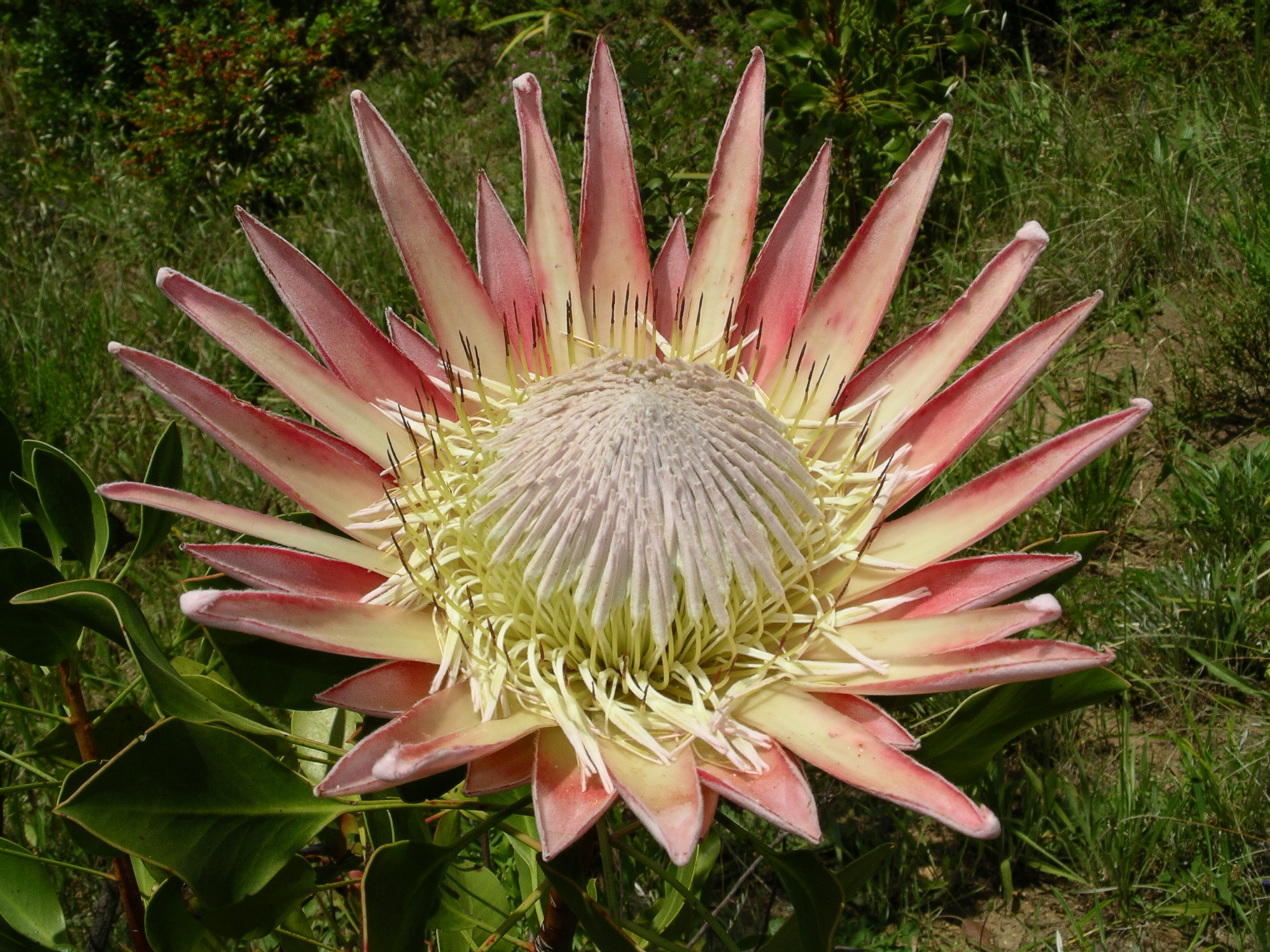

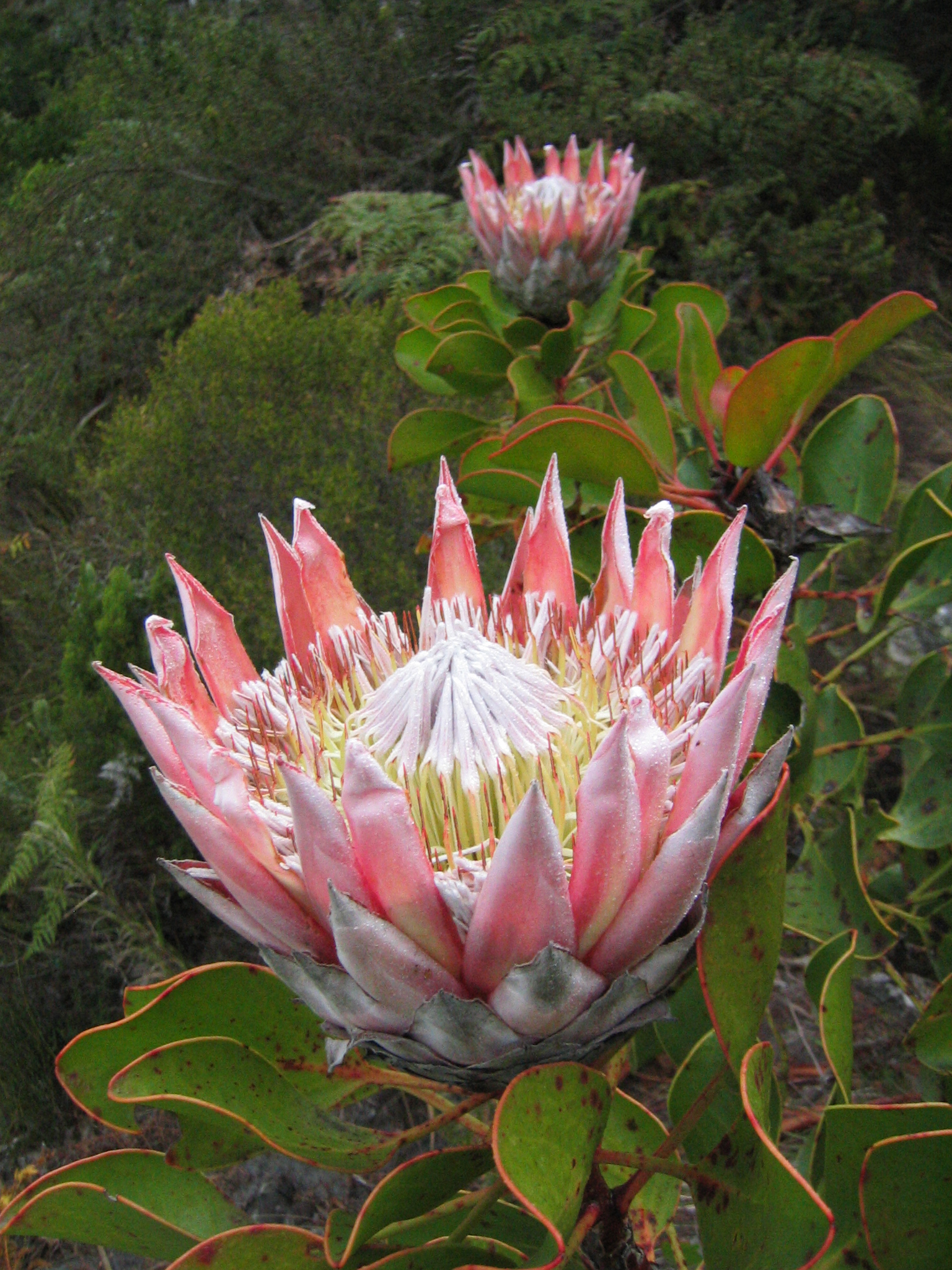

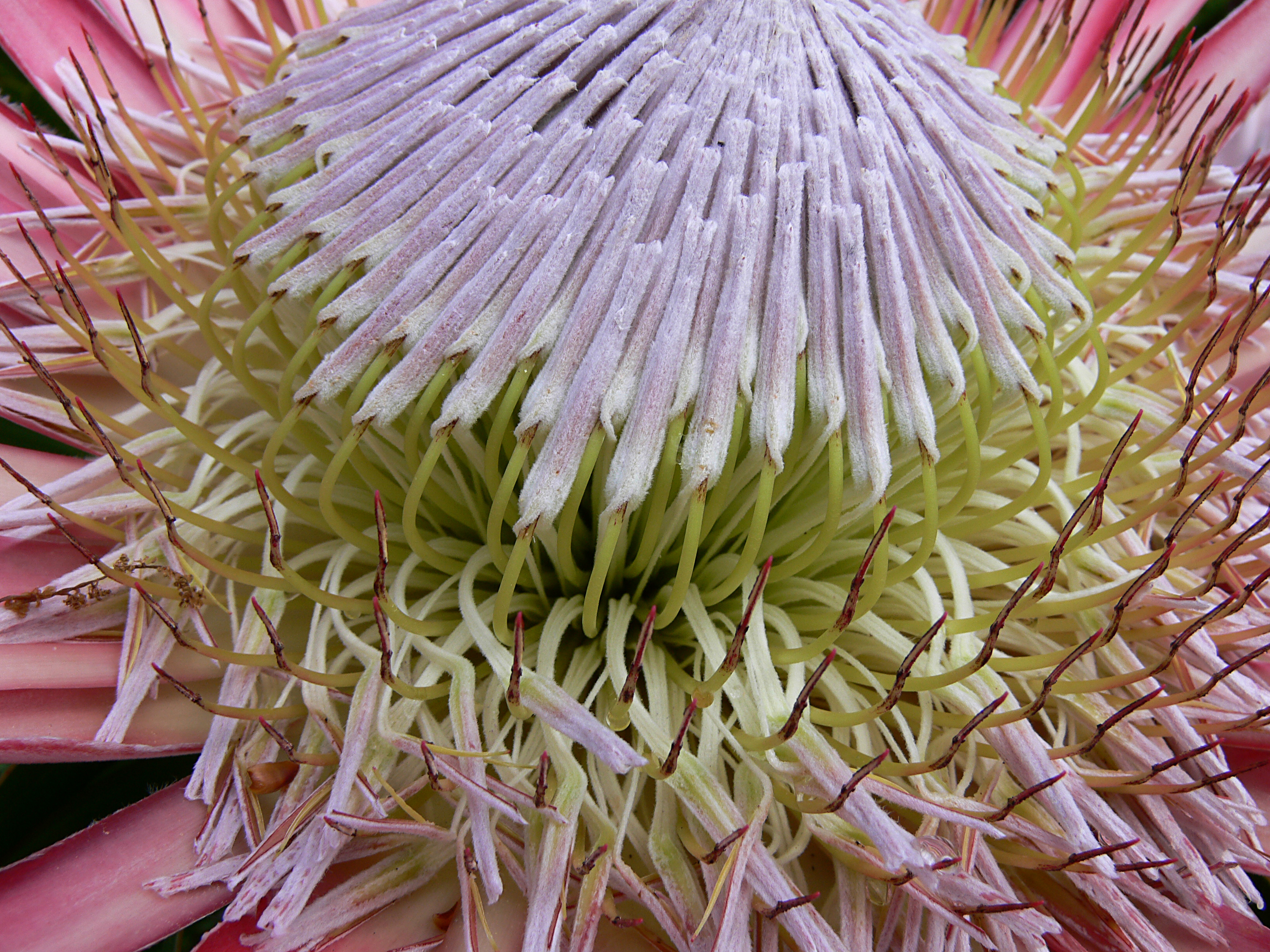
Western Cape, South Africa

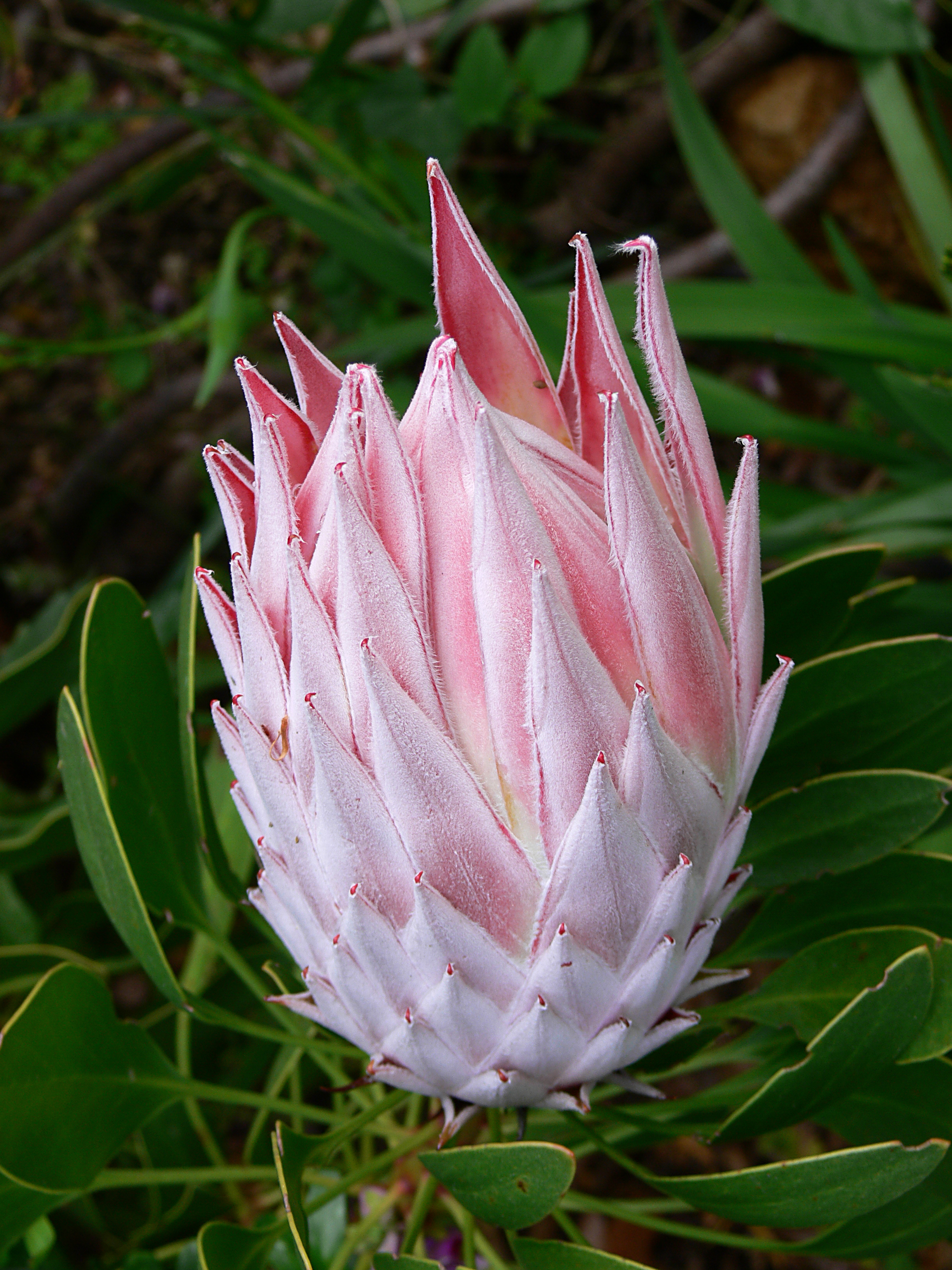
Western Cape, South Africa

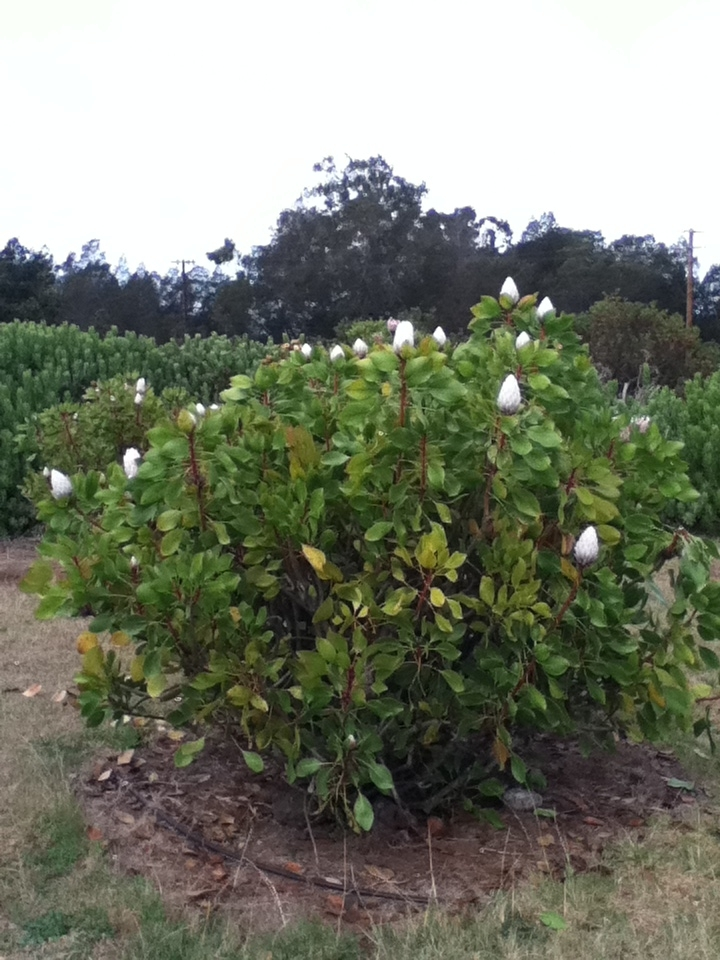

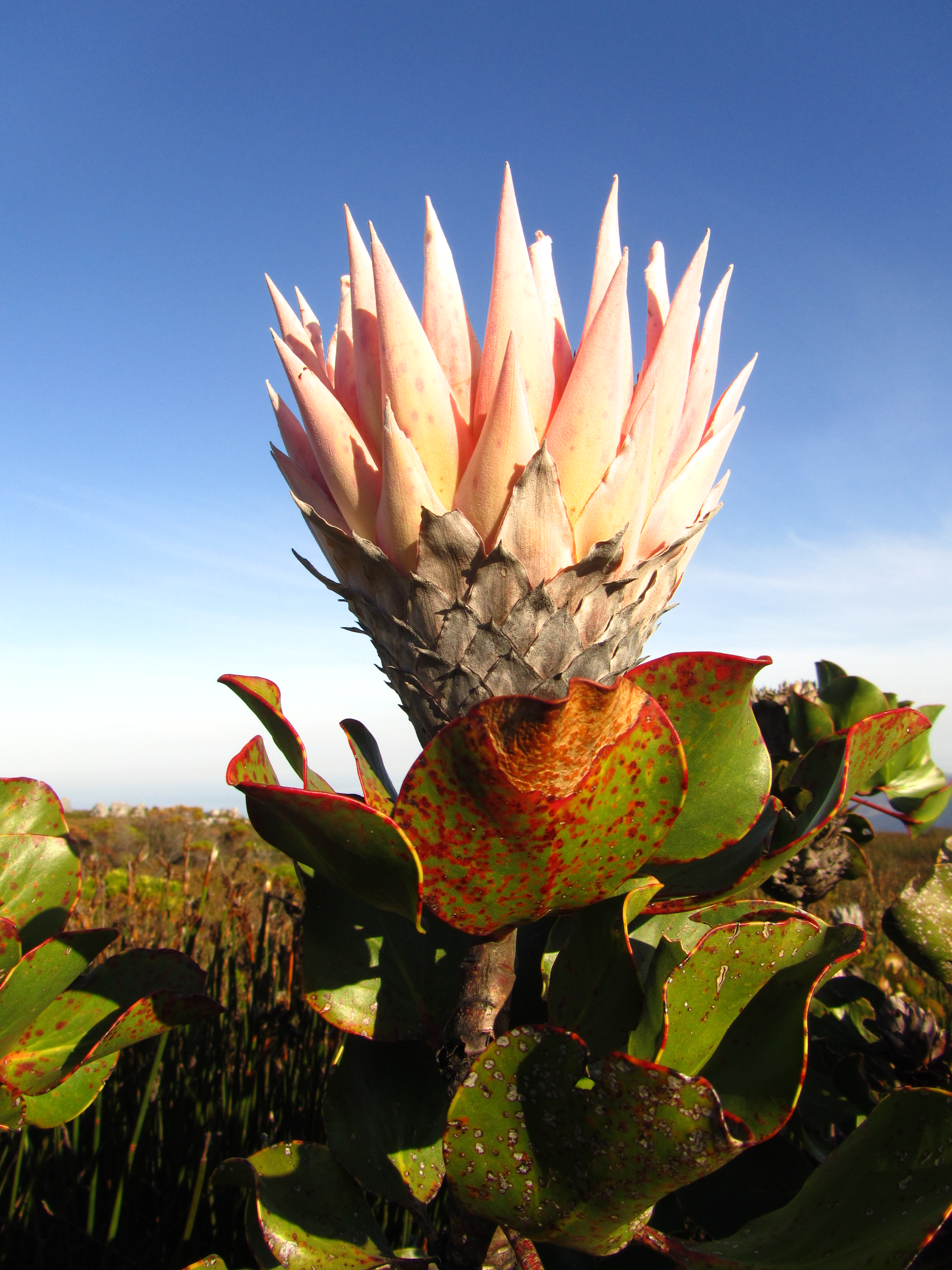
On Table Mountain, eastern table, near Mclear Beacon
