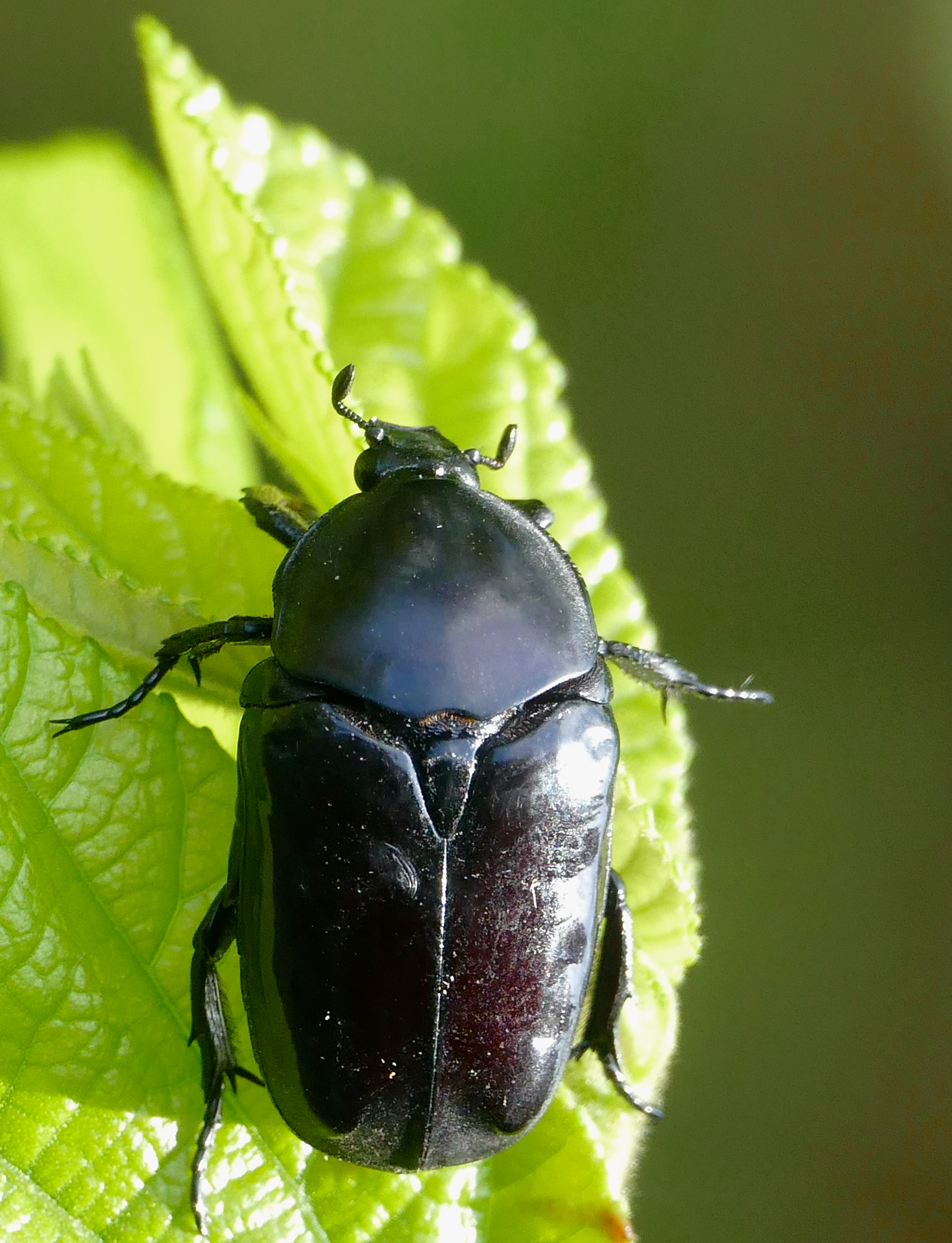
- Diplognatha gagates

Scientific classification
- Kingdom: Animalia
- Phylum: Arthropoda
- Clade: Pancrustacea
- Class: Insecta
- Order: Coleoptera
- Suborder: Polyphaga
- Infraorder: Scarabaeiformia
- Family: Scarabaeidae
- Subfamily: Cetoniinae
- Tribe: Diplognathini; Burmeister, 1842

Synonyms
- Porphyronotii Péringuey, 1907; Cryptodontina

= Diplognathini =

Tribe of beetles

Diplognathini is a tribe of scarab beetles in the subfamily Cetoniinae. It was erected by Hermann Burmeister in 1842 (originally as family "Diplognathideae"), based on the African type genus Diplognatha.

== Genera ==
The following genera are recognised in the tribe Diplognathini:

1. Anoplocheilus MacLeay, 1838
2. Anthracophora Burmeister, 1842
3. Anthracophorides Moser, 1918
4. Apocnosoides Antoine, 2001
5. Charadronota Burmeister, 1842
6. Conradtia Kolbe, 1892
7. Diphrontis Gerstaecker, 1882
8. Diplognatha Gory & Percheron, 1833
9. Eriulis Burmeister, 1842
10. Hadrodiplognatha Kraatz, 1898
11. Heteropseudinca Valck Lucassen, 1933
12. Lamellothyrea Krikken, 1980
13. Metallopseudinca Valck Lucassen, 1933
14. Nselenius Holm & Perissinotto, 2004
15. Odontorrhina Burmeister, 1842
16. Parapoecilophila Hauser, 1904
17. Phonopleurus Moser, 1919
18. Pilinopyga Kraatz, 1888
19. Porphyronota Burmeister, 1842
20. Pseudinca Kraatz, 1880
21. Stethopseudinca Valck Lucassen, 1933
22. Tetragonorrhina Kraatz, 1896
23. Trichostetha Burmeister, 1842
24. Triplognatha Krikken, 1987
25. Trymodera Gerstaecker, 1867
26. Uloptera Burmeister, 1842
