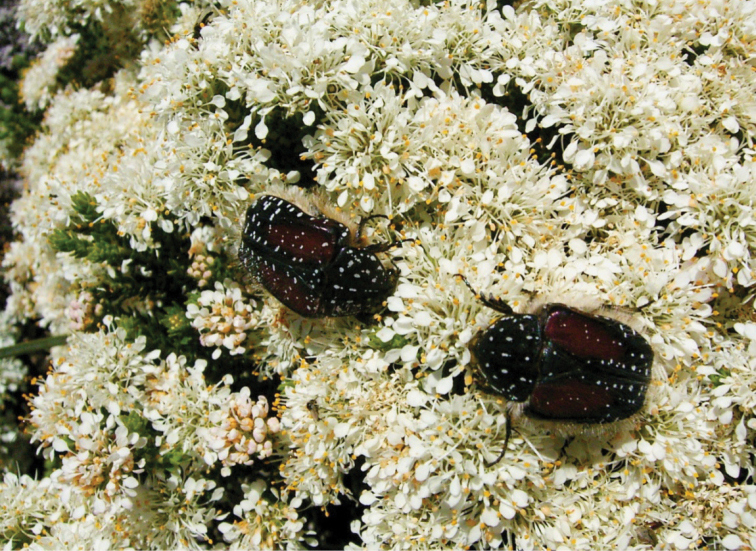
- Trichostetha bicolor feeding on flowers of Agathosma capensis (Rutaceae) at Saldanha Bay, September 2004

Scientific classification
- Kingdom: Animalia
- Phylum: Arthropoda
- Class: Insecta
- Order: Coleoptera
- Suborder: Polyphaga
- Infraorder: Scarabaeiformia
- Family: Scarabaeidae
- Genus: Trichostetha
- Species: T. bicolor

Binomial name
- Trichostetha bicolor Péringuey

= Trichostetha bicolor =

Species of beetle

Trichostetha bicolor is an afrotropical species of flower scarab beetle endemic to South Africa, where it occurs in the Cape Floristic Region. It is sometimes synonymized with Trichostetha capensis, but in addition to morphological differences, T. bicolor is found further north and in different habitat types than the former species, with no intermediate forms or populations.
