= Tetragonorrhina =

Scientific classification
- Kingdom: Animalia
- Phylum: Arthropoda
- Clade: Pancrustacea
- Class: Insecta
- Order: Coleoptera
- Suborder: Polyphaga
- Infraorder: Scarabaeiformia
- Family: Scarabaeidae
- Subfamily: Cetoniinae
- Tribe: Diplognathini
- Genus: Tetragonorrhina; Kraatz, 1896

Synonyms
- Tetragonorhina

Genus of leaf beetles

Tetragonorrhina is a genus of beetles belonging to the family Scarabaeidae.

== Species ==
- Tetragonorrhina induta (Janson, 1877)
- Tetragonorrhina peringueyi Holm & Marais, 1992
