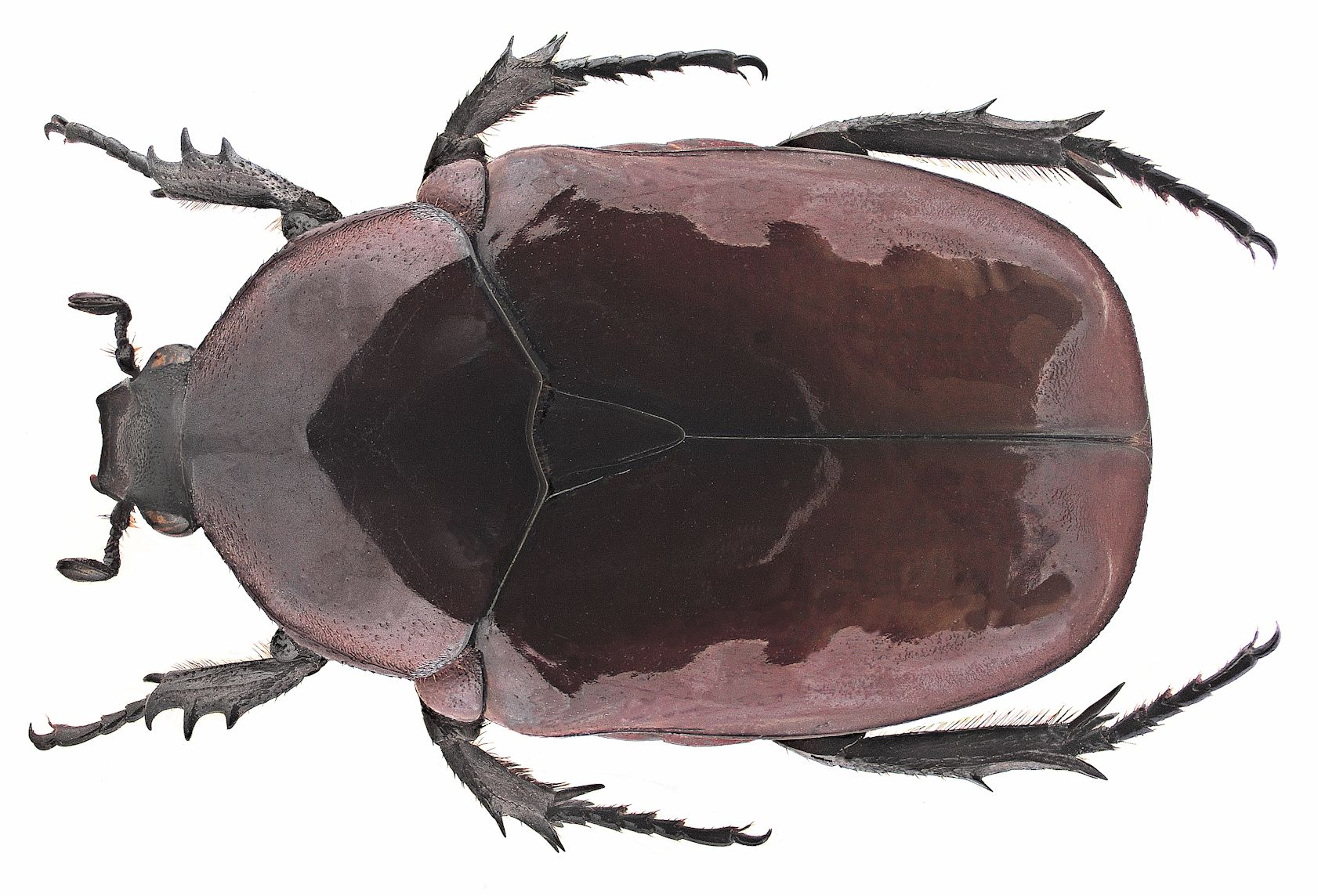

Scientific classification
- Kingdom: Animalia
- Phylum: Arthropoda
- Class: Insecta
- Order: Coleoptera
- Suborder: Polyphaga
- Infraorder: Scarabaeiformia
- Family: Scarabaeidae
- Genus: Diplognatha
- Species: D. gagates

Binomial name
- Diplognatha gagates Forster, 1771

Synonyms
- Scarabaeus carbonaria De Geer, 1774; Scarabaeus gagates Forster, 1771

= Diplognatha gagates =

Species of beetle

Diplognatha gagates is a species of beetle belonging to the family Scarabaeidae, subfamily Cetoniinae.

== Description ==
Diplognatha gagates can reach a length of about 16–32 millimetres (0.63–1.26 in). The thorax is very convex. The surface is shining black or reddish. Larvae feed on bird droppings. Young adults are usually reddish brown and feed on flowers, fruits and sap.

== Distribution ==
This species is widespread in almost all African countries south of the Sahara.

== Subspecies ==
- Diplognatha gagates holoserica Bainbridge, 1842 (West Africa, Mali, Sénégal, Burkina Faso, Nigeria)
- Diplognatha gagates silicea MacLeay, 1838 (Namibia, Republic of South Africa, Mozambique)
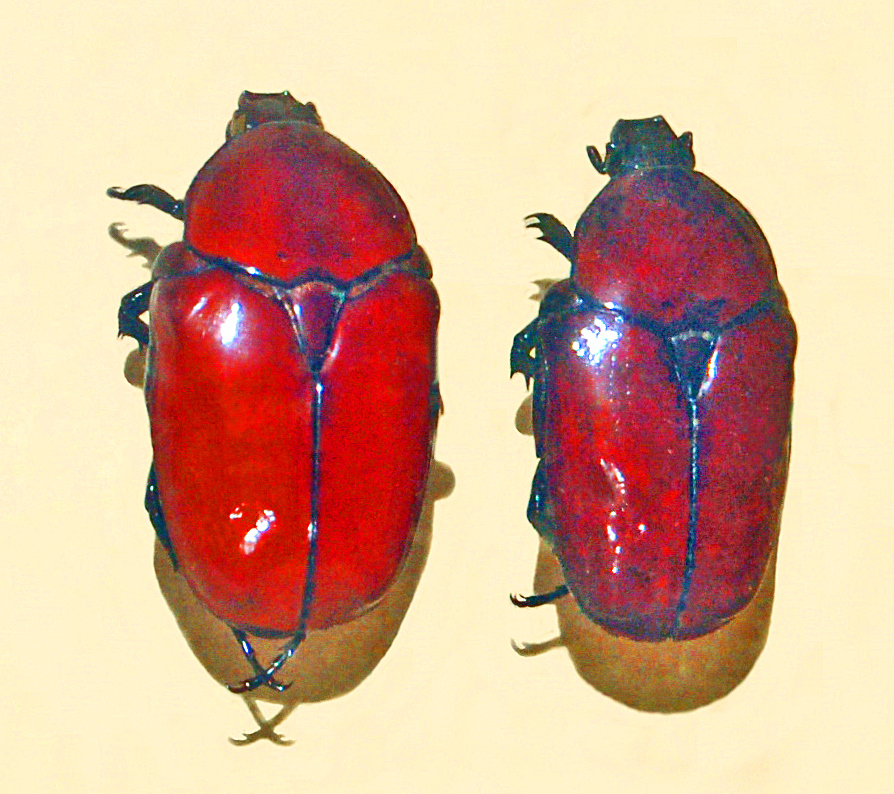
Diplognatha gagates from Guinea-Bissau

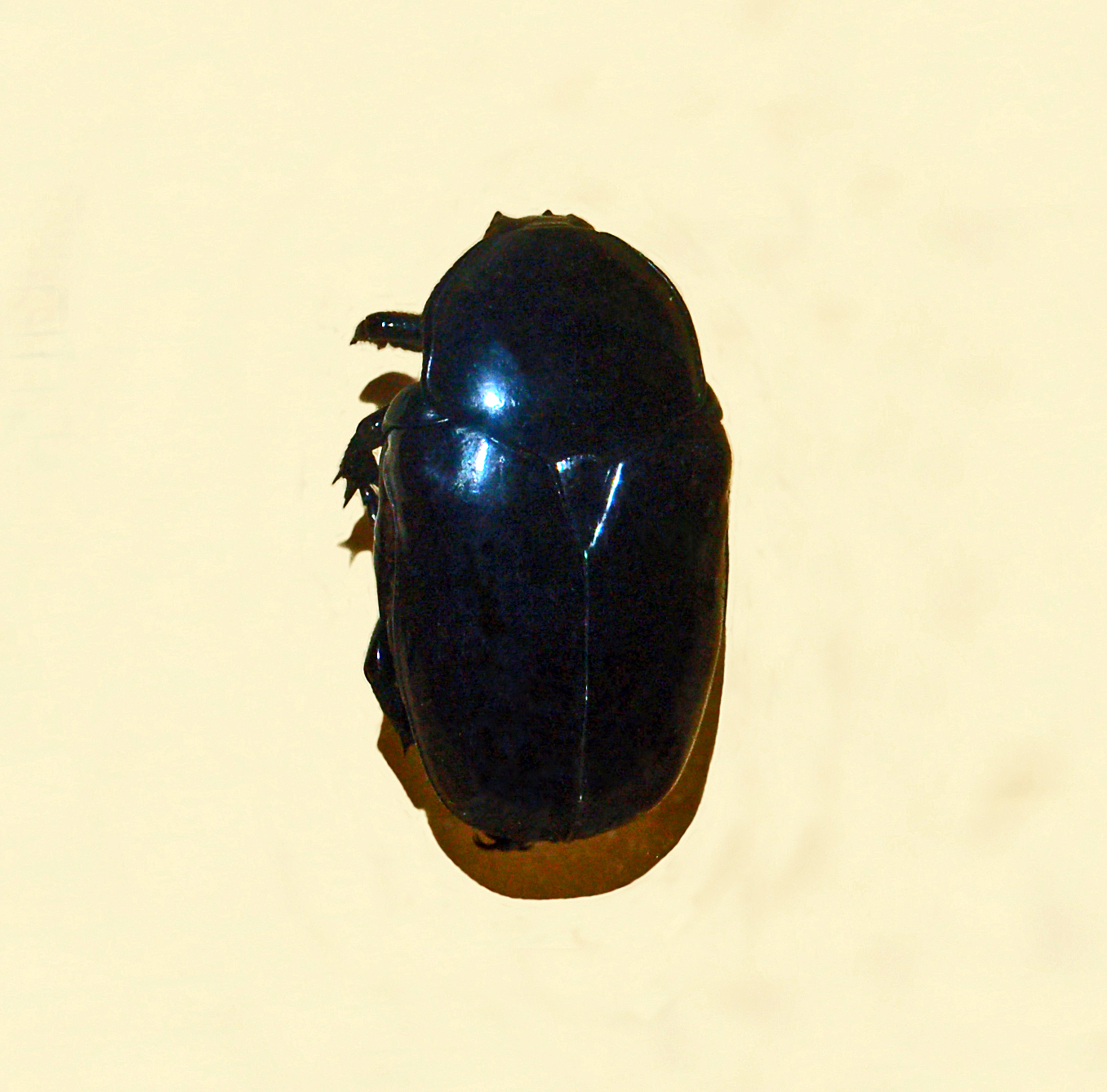
Diplognatha gagates silicea, from Uganda

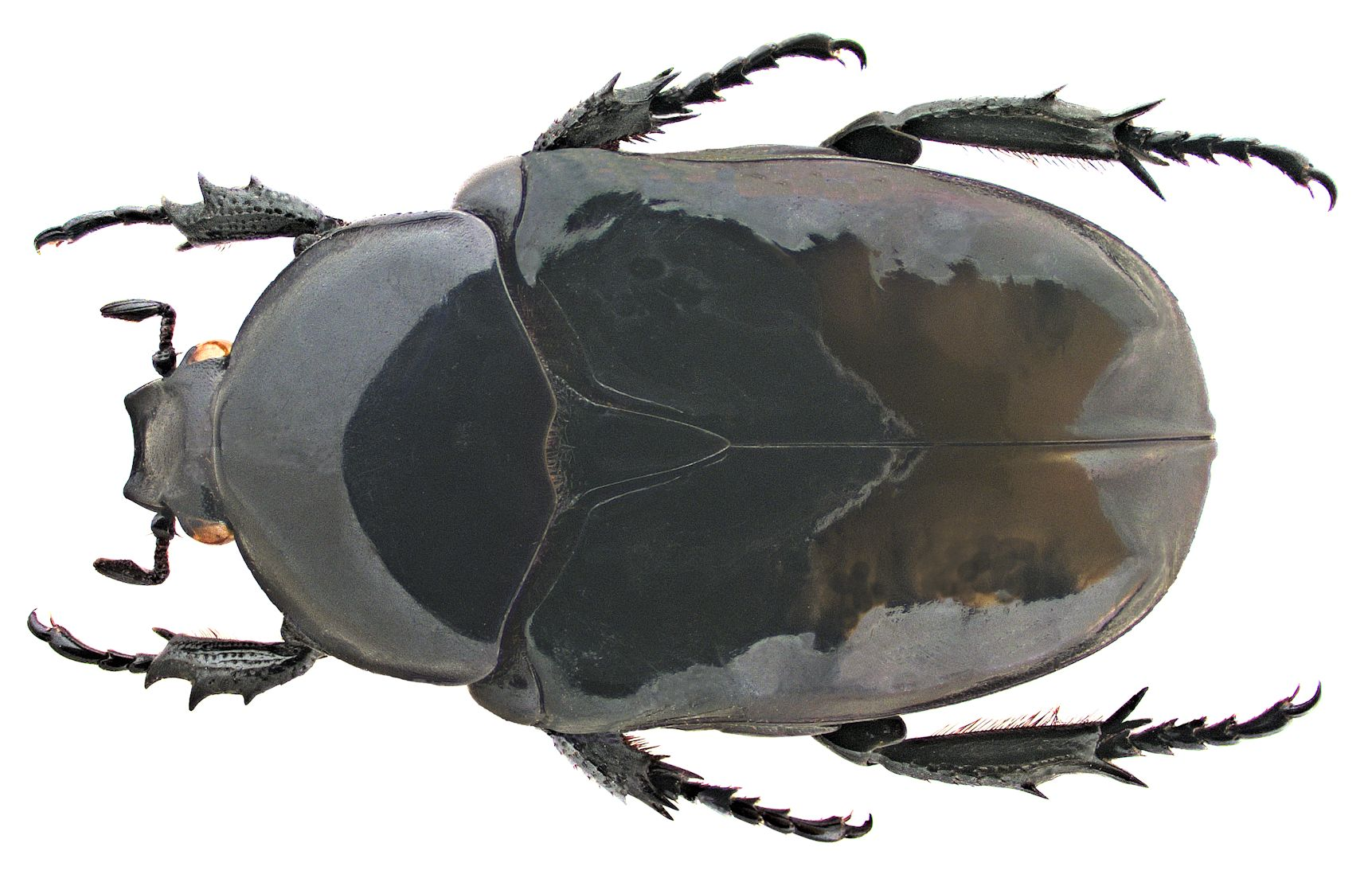
Diplognatha gagates silicea
