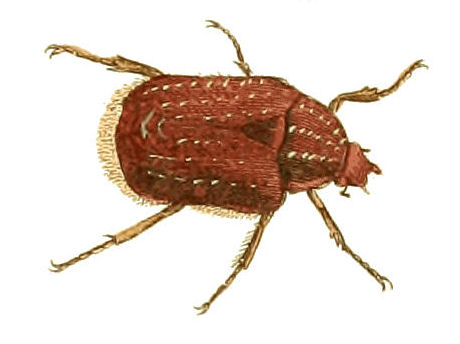

Scientific classification
- Kingdom: Animalia
- Phylum: Arthropoda
- Class: Insecta
- Order: Coleoptera
- Suborder: Polyphaga
- Infraorder: Scarabaeiformia
- Family: Scarabaeidae
- Genus: Trichostetha
- Species: T. capensis

Binomial name
- Trichostetha capensis (Linnaeus, 1758)

Synonyms
- Cetonia propinqua Gory & Percheron, 1833; Scarabaeus albopunctatus De Geer, 1778; Scarabaeus barbatulus Voet, 1779; Trichostetha bicolor Péringuey, 1907 - sometimes consider a valid separate species—see Trichostetha bicolor; Trichostetha capensis oweni Allard, 1992

= Trichostetha capensis =

Species of beetle

Trichostetha capensis, also known as the brunia beetle and the Cape Protea chafer, is an afrotropical species of flower scarab beetle endemic to South Africa, where it occurs in the Cape Floristic Region.
