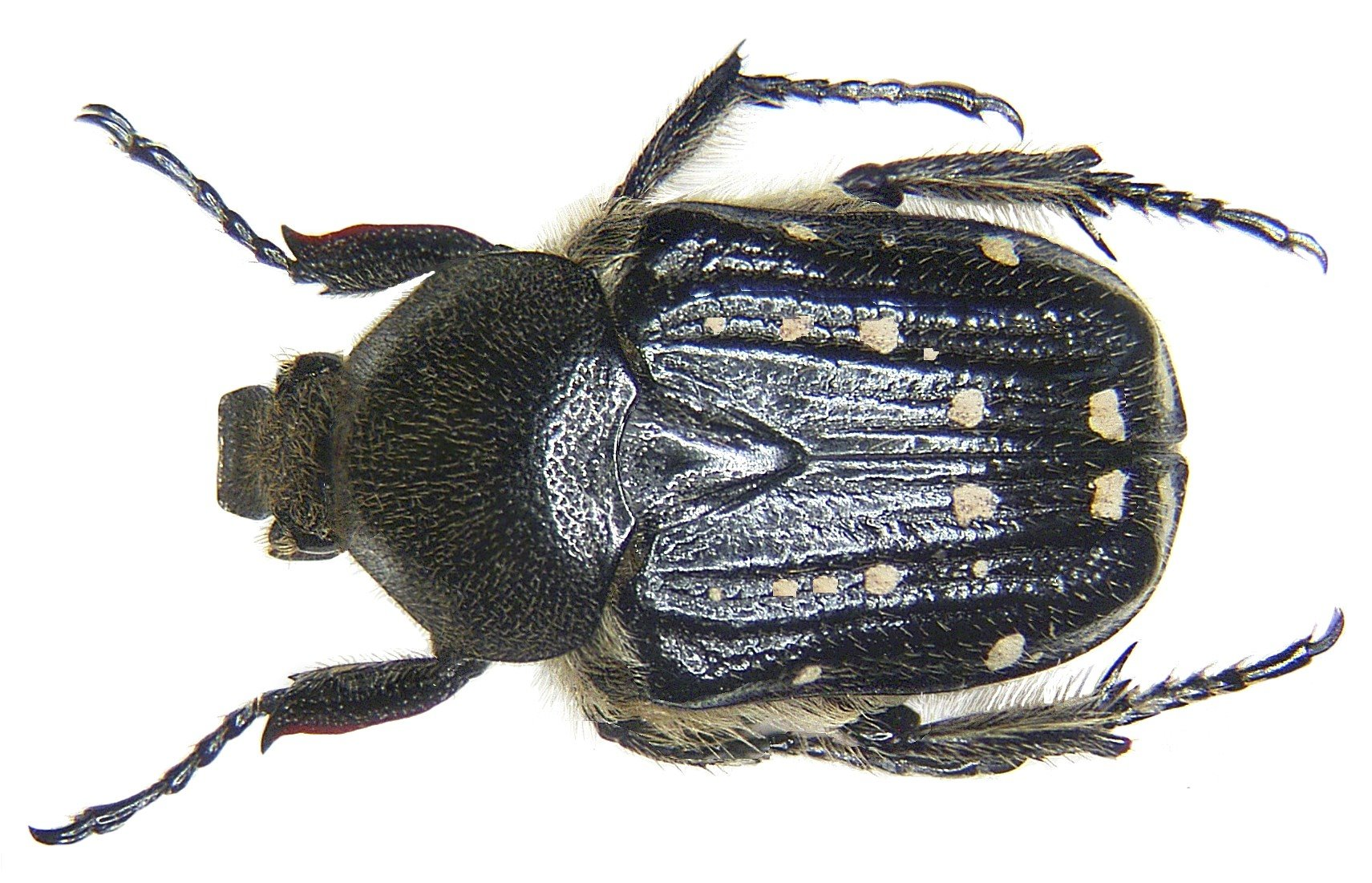

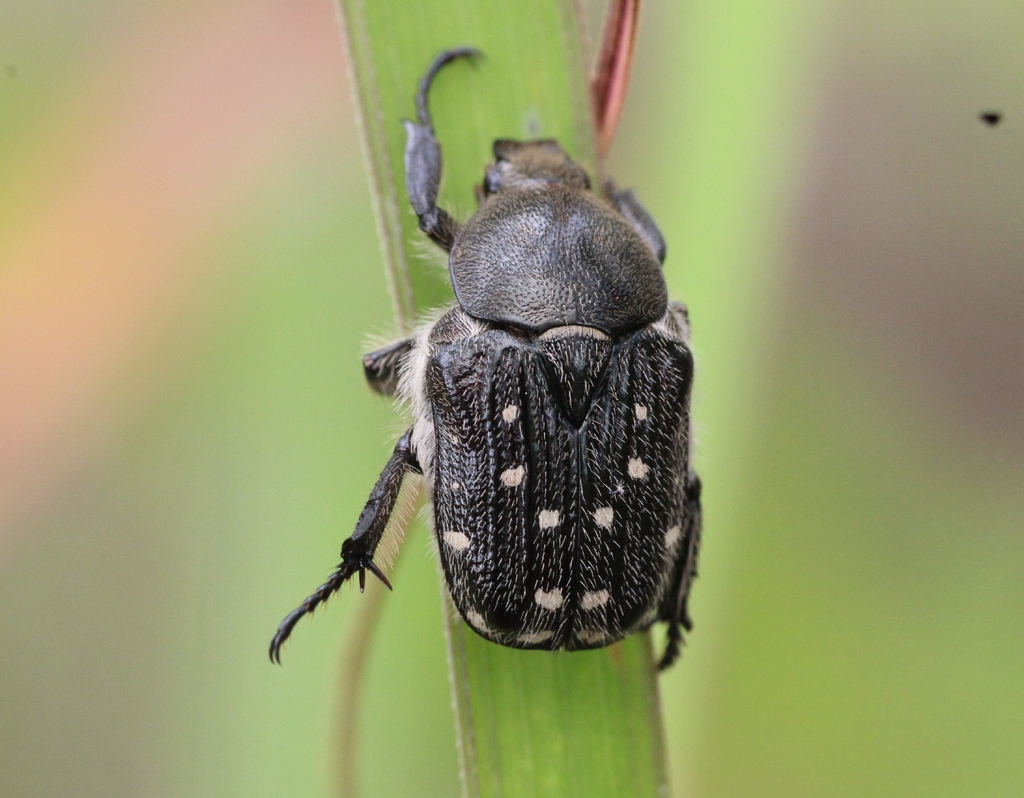

Scientific classification
- Kingdom: Animalia
- Phylum: Arthropoda
- Clade: Pancrustacea
- Class: Insecta
- Order: Coleoptera
- Suborder: Polyphaga
- Infraorder: Scarabaeiformia
- Family: Scarabaeidae
- Genus: Tetragonorrhina
- Species: T. induta

Binomial name
- Tetragonorrhina induta (Janson, 1877)

Synonyms
- Anoplochilus indutus Janson, 1877; Tetragonorhina albomaculata Kraatz, 1896

= Tetragonorrhina induta =

Species of beetle

Tetragonorrhina induta is a species of beetle of the family Scarabaeidae. It is found in Angola, Kenya, Malawi and South Africa (KwaZulu-Natal).

== Description ==
Adults reach a length of about 11–12 mm (0.43–0.47 in). They are black or fuscous black, shiny but covered on the upper side with an upright sub-flavescent pubescence resulting from all the punctures being setigerous. The underside is densely hairy.
