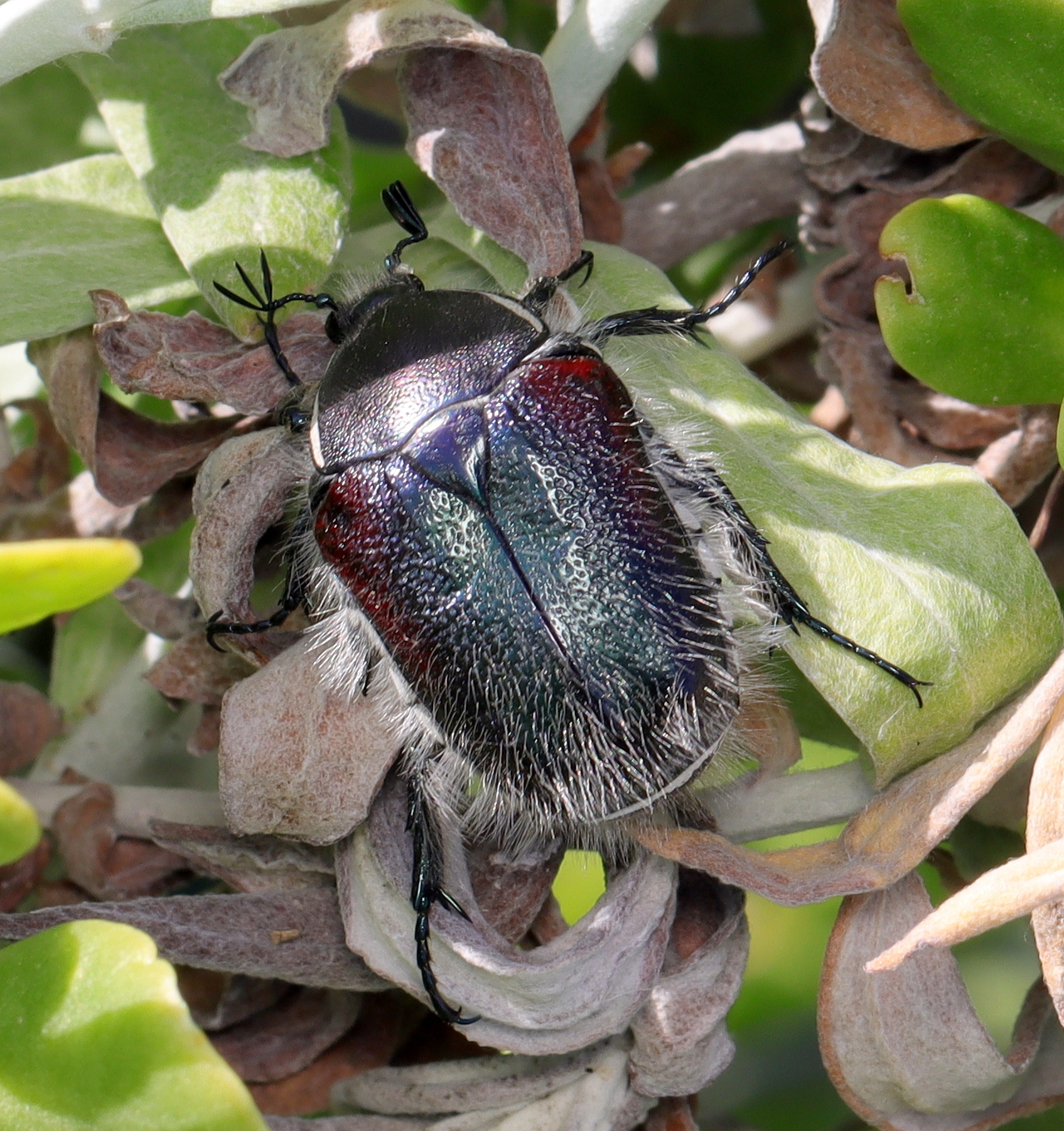
- Odontorrhina pubescens

Scientific classification
- Kingdom: Animalia
- Phylum: Arthropoda
- Class: Insecta
- Order: Coleoptera
- Suborder: Polyphaga
- Infraorder: Scarabaeiformia
- Family: Scarabaeidae
- Subfamily: Cetoniinae
- Tribe: Diplognathini
- Genus: Odontorrhina; Burmeister, 1842

Type species
- Cetonia pubescens

Species
- Odontorrhina hispida (Olivier, 1789); (= Cetonia hispida Olivier 1789) (= Cetonia hirsuta Thunberg 1818): Odontorrhina krigei Schein, 1950; Odontorrhina maraisi Perissinotto, 2012; Odontorrhina pubescens (Olivier, 1789); (= Cetonia pubescens Olivier 1789): O. pubescens subsp. hantam Perissinotto, 2012; O. pubescens subsp. pubescens (Olivier, 1789)

= Odontorrhina =

Genus of flower chafer beetles

Odontorrhina is a genus of flower chafer beetles comprising four species and two subspecies. The bodies of all species are heavily covered with small bristles (setae), and they are believed to be most closely related to the genus Trichostetha. Members of the genus have been recorded exclusively from the South African provinces of the Northern and Western Cape, aside from one unconfirmed record from southern Namibia. They are endemic to the Fynbos and Succulent Karoo regions.

== Species ==
=== Odontorrhina hispida ===
Odontorrhina hispida are a slightly metallic bronze in colour, and their entire backs covered with short fulvous (tawny) or yellow hairs. They grow roughly 18 mm long and 11 mm wide.

Larvae of this species have been found with those of Ichnestoma coetzeri under Asteraceae or Rhamnaceae plants. They are considered rare by collectors.

Its range is more inland and eastern than other members of the genus Odontorrhina, and its habitat is primarily mountainous.

=== Odontorrhina krigei ===
Odontorrhina krigei is almost completely black in colour, including in most cases its bristles. This species appears to spend much of its adult life in or around termite mounds, where they also develop as grubs. Like O. hispida, its range is more inland than other species, and it is restricted to more mountainous regions.

=== Odontorrhina maraisi ===
Odontorrhina maraisi are bronze to black in colour on their backs and olive green to bronze on their undersides. Specimens differ from O. hispida in that their hairs are white instead of tawny or yellow, and from O. pubescens by their darker colouration. This species can grow between 17.5 and 22 mm long and between roughly 10 and 12 mm across.

The species epithet, maraisi, is named after one Andre P. Marais, who lead observations of the species.

=== Odontorrhina pubescens ===
O. pubescens are only lightly bristly on their backs, but densely so on their undersides. They are bronze-green in colour on their backs, and their legs are a bright green. The species comprises two subspecies: O. p. hantam and O. p. pubescens. The former is restricted to higher-altitude habitat.

== Conservation status ==
Although no Odontorrhina species are included in the IUCN Red List of threatened species, a 2012 paper suggested that the genus is potentially under threat if the effects of climate change in the areas to which it is endemic worsen.

== Life cycle ==
Most Odontorrhina species develop as larvae under shrubs, using the shade as protection from heat or dehydration. Odontorrhina krigei, however, makes use of termite mounds, albeit with similar results. O. krigei grubs feed on refuse from the termite mound, while grubs of other species feed on leaf litter.

== Gallery ==
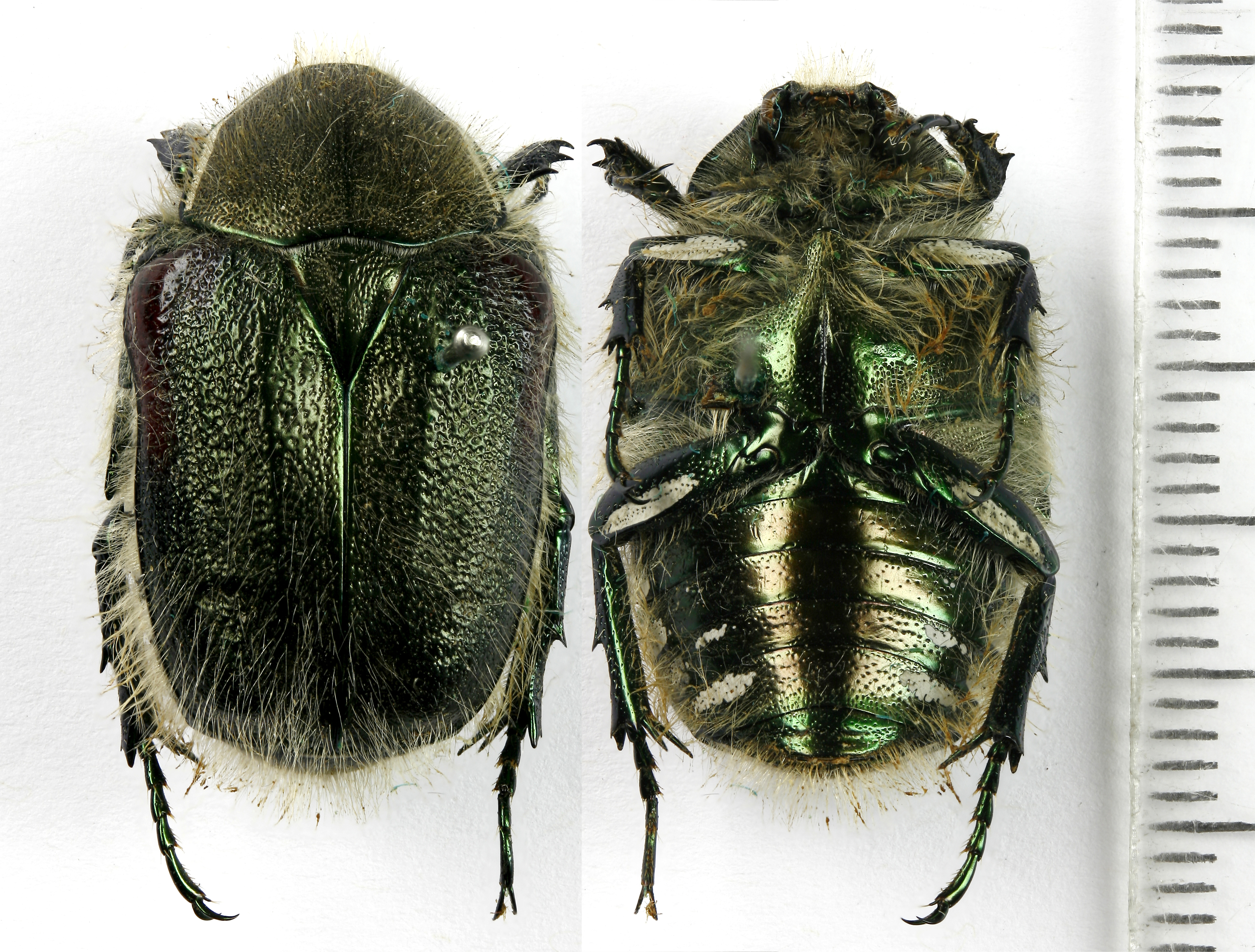
Odontorrhina pubescens Olivier, 1789

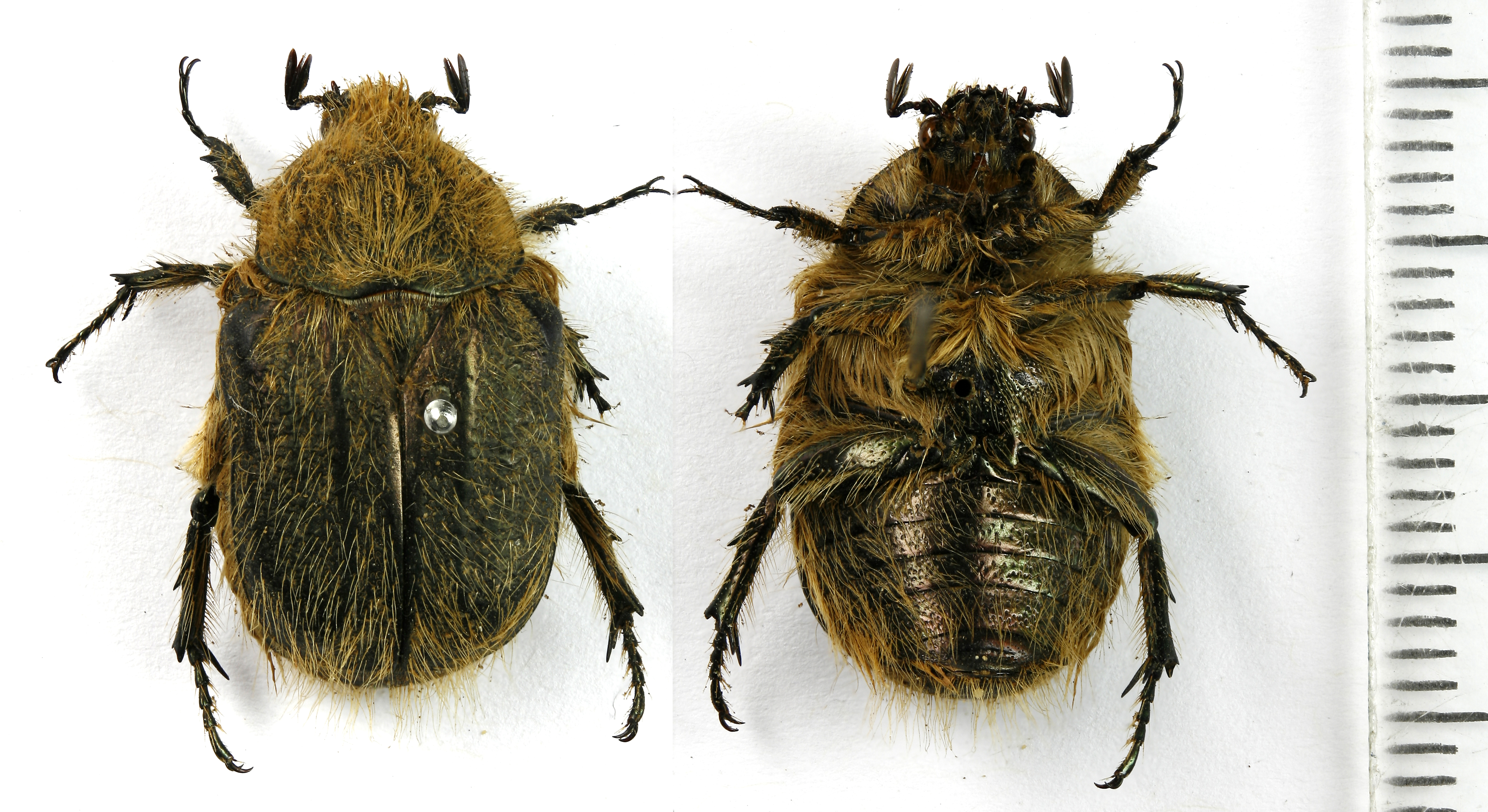
Odontorrhina hispida Olivier, 1789

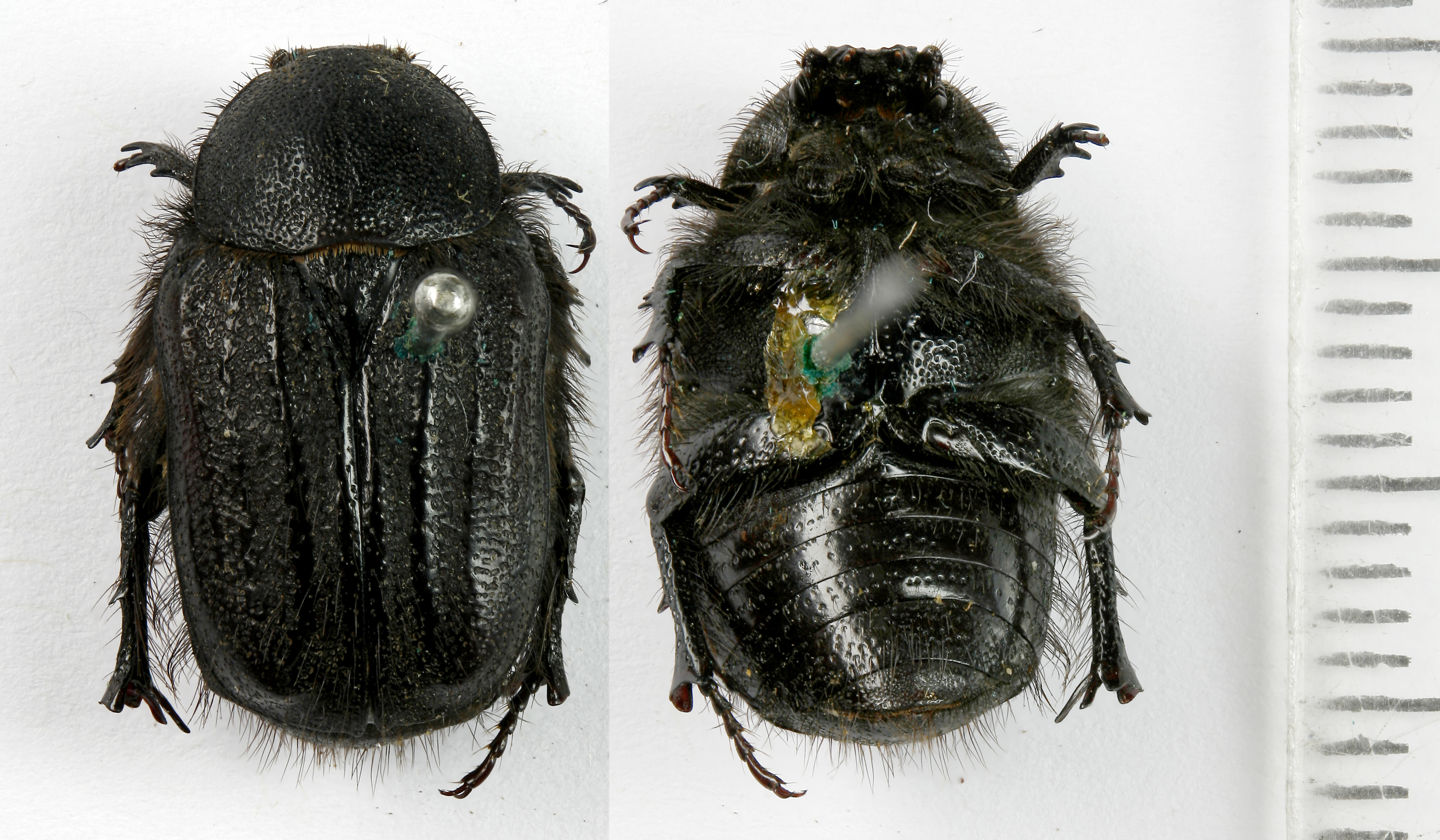
Odontorrhina krigei Schein, 1950
