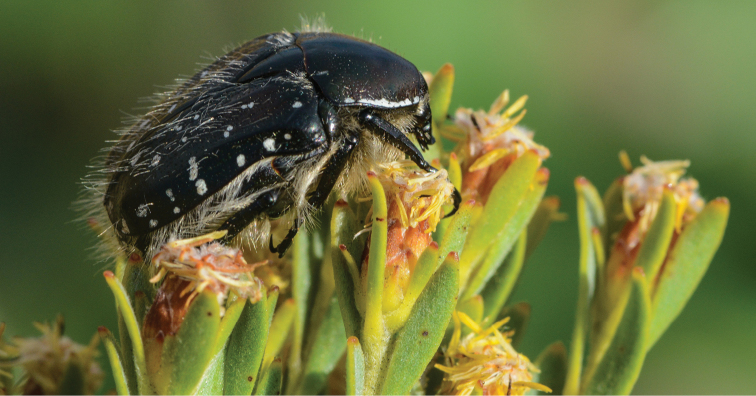
- A male Trichostetha curlei

Scientific classification
- Kingdom: Animalia
- Phylum: Arthropoda
- Class: Insecta
- Order: Coleoptera
- Suborder: Polyphaga
- Infraorder: Scarabaeiformia
- Family: Scarabaeidae
- Genus: Trichostetha
- Species: T. curlei

Binomial name
- Trichostetha curlei Perissinotto, Šípek & Ball, 2014

= Trichostetha curlei =

Species of beetle

Trichostetha coetzeri is an afrotropical species of flower scarab beetle endemic to South Africa, where it occurs in the Cape Floristic Region. It was first described by Perissinotto, Šípek & Ball, 2014.
