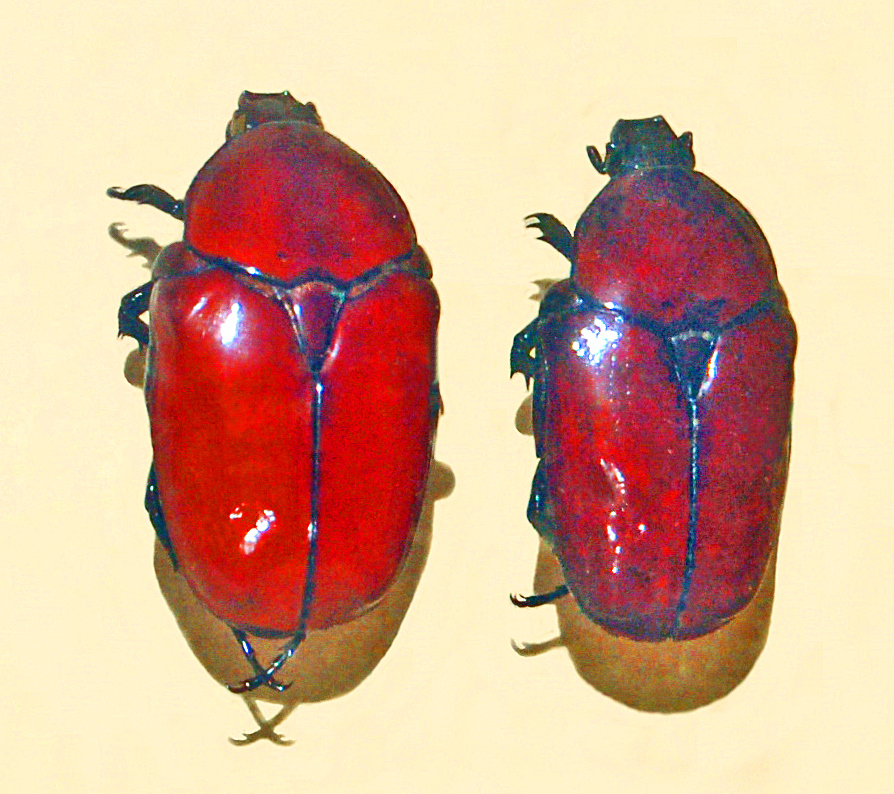
- Diplognatha gagates from Guinea-Bissau

Scientific classification
- Kingdom: Animalia
- Phylum: Arthropoda
- Clade: Pancrustacea
- Class: Insecta
- Order: Coleoptera
- Suborder: Polyphaga
- Infraorder: Scarabaeiformia
- Family: Scarabaeidae
- Subfamily: Cetoniinae
- Tribe: Diplognathini
- Genus: Diplognatha; Gory & Percheron, 1833

= Diplognatha =

Genus of beetles

Diplognatha is a genus of "flower beetles" belonging to the family Scarabaeidae, subfamily Cetoniinae.

== Description ==
Species of this genus are of medium size (approx. 20–27 mm). The body is slightly oblong and flat, with a shiny surface, usually black or brown, but some species have a distinct metallic sheen. A sexual dimorphism is barely visible. The larvae usually live in the soil, but some species are supposed to develop in bird and bee nests. In some species, the adult beetles live for several years, which is relatively uncommon.

== Distribution ==
These beetles live in tropical Africa. The species Diplognatha gagates is found almost everywhere in Africa south of Sahara.

== Species ==
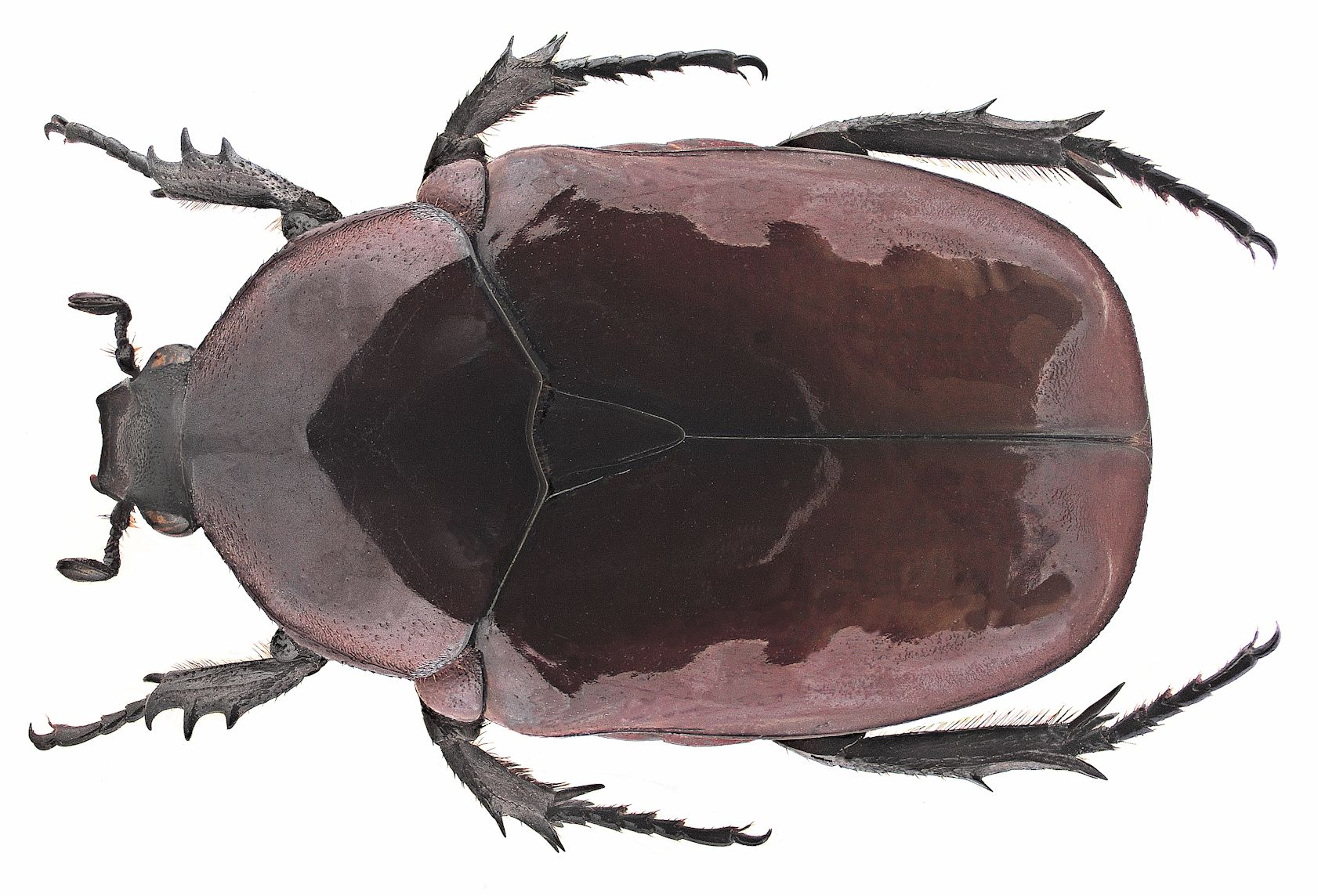
Diplognatha gagates

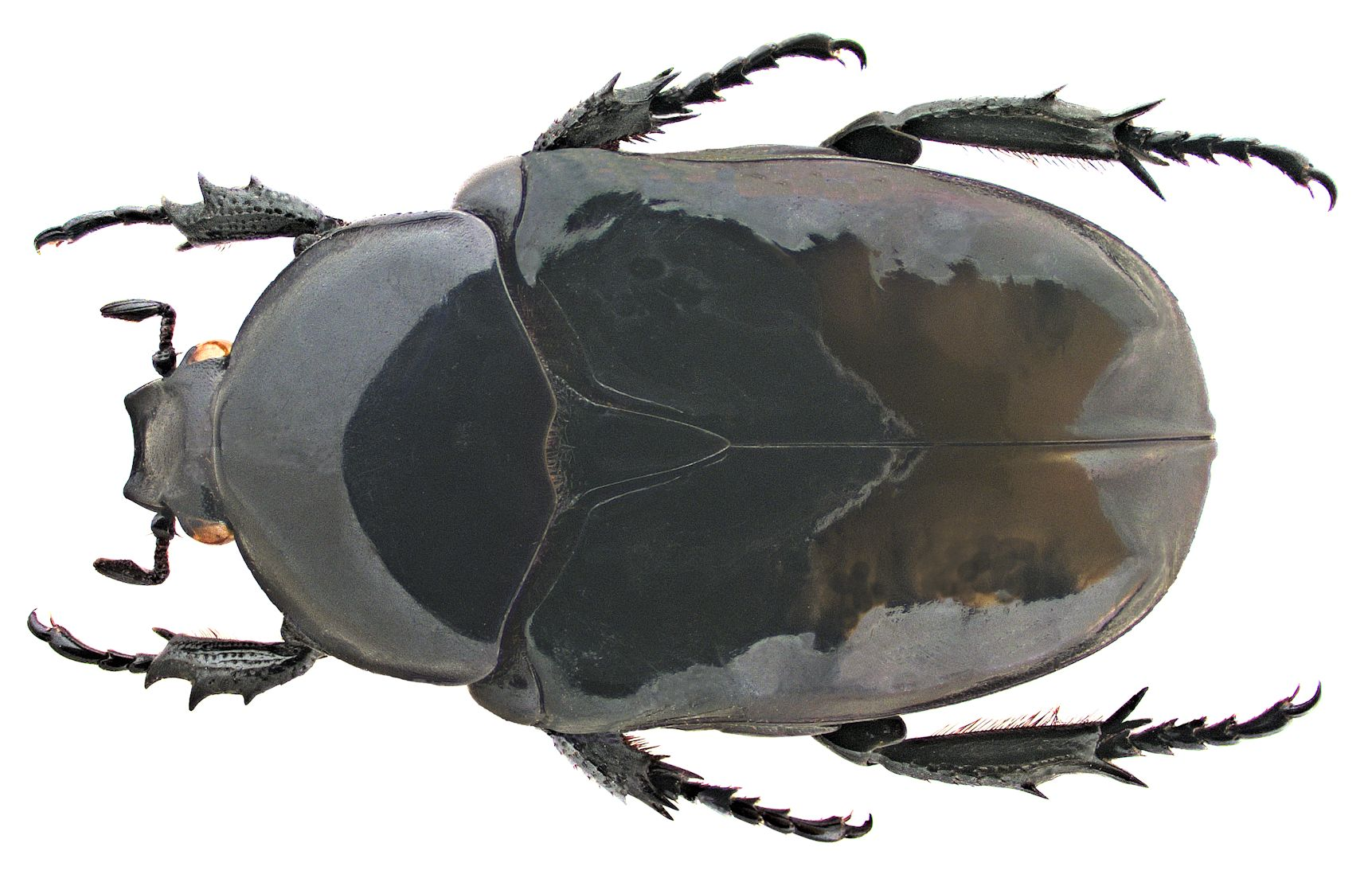
Diplognatha silicea

- Diplognatha blanchardi Schaum, 1844
- Diplognatha crampeli Fairmaire, 1893
- Diplognatha gagates (Forster, 1771)
- Diplognatha silicea Macleay, 1838
- Diplognatha inaequalis Schürhoff, 1942
- Diplognatha jeanneli Bourgoin, 1913
- Diplognatha mhondana Moser, 1901
- Diplognatha montana Kolbe, 1892
- Diplognatha pagana Harold, 1879
- Diplognatha preussi Kolbe, 1892
- Diplognatha pupurascens (Fabricius, 1801)
- Diplognatha striata Janson, 1877
- Diplognatha subaenea Duvivier, 1891
- Diplognatha viridichalcea Kolbe, 1897
- Diplognatha viridula Janson, 1878
