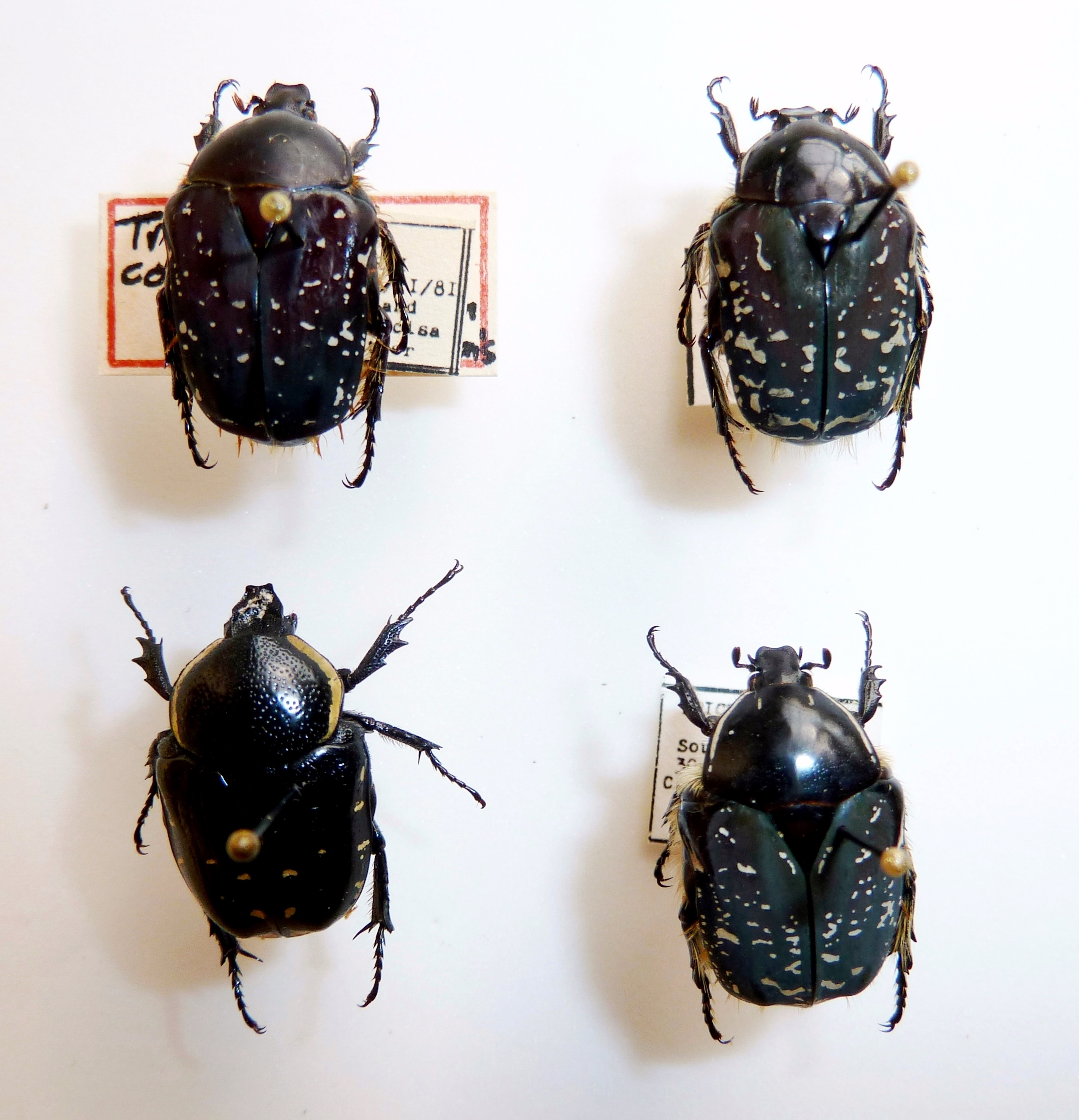
- Collection of four specimens of T. coetzeri

Scientific classification
- Domain: Eukaryota
- Kingdom: Animalia
- Phylum: Arthropoda
- Class: Insecta
- Order: Coleoptera
- Suborder: Polyphaga
- Infraorder: Scarabaeiformia
- Family: Scarabaeidae
- Genus: Trichostetha
- Species: T. coetzeri

Binomial name
- Trichostetha coetzeri Holm & Marais, 1988

= Trichostetha coetzeri =

Species of beetle

Trichostetha coetzeri is an afrotropical species of flower scarab beetle endemic to South Africa, where it occurs in the Cape Floristic Region. It was first described by Holm and Marais in 1988.
