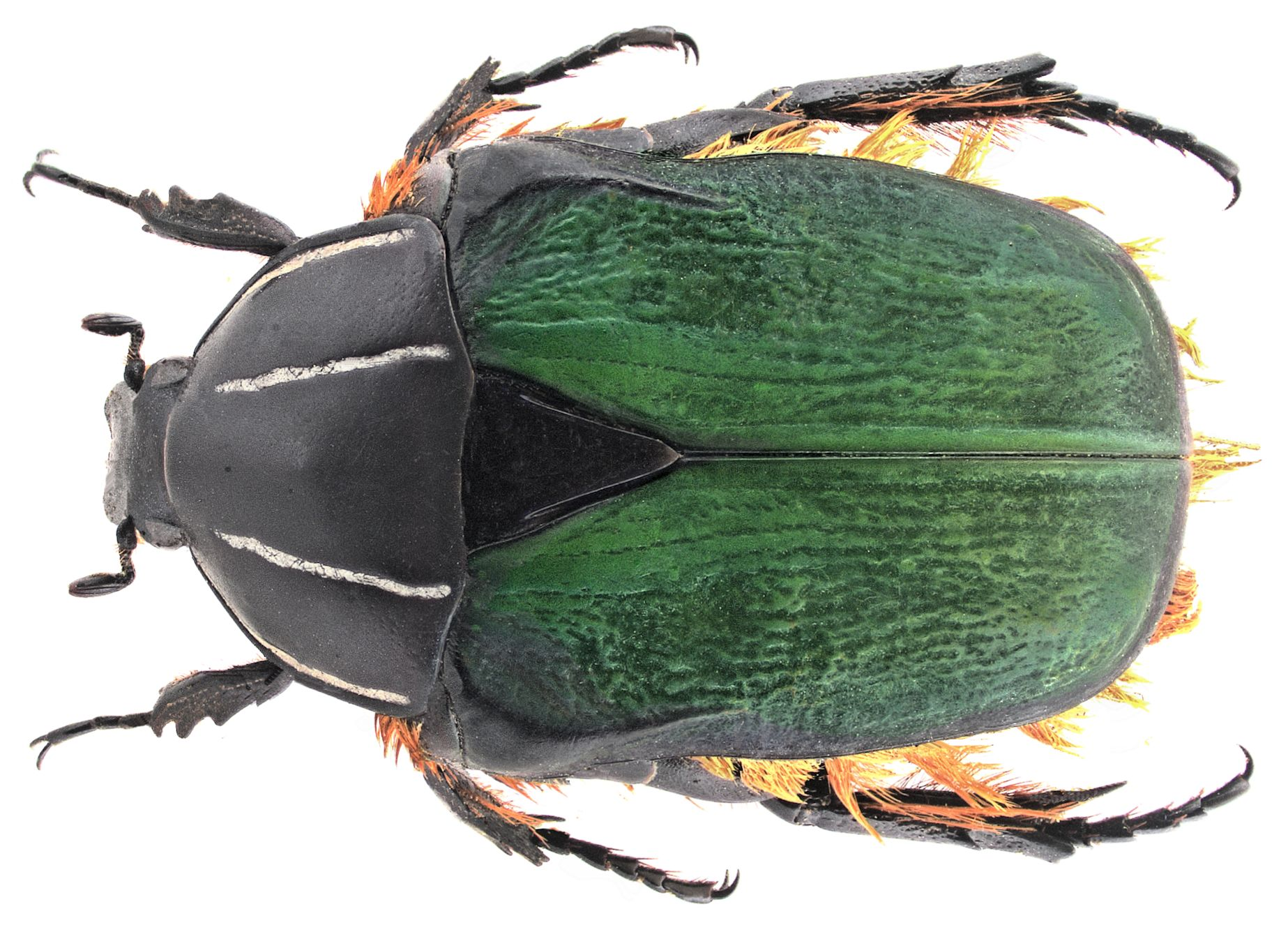

Scientific classification
- Kingdom: Animalia
- Phylum: Arthropoda
- Class: Insecta
- Order: Coleoptera
- Suborder: Polyphaga
- Infraorder: Scarabaeiformia
- Family: Scarabaeidae
- Genus: Trichostetha
- Species: T. fascicularis

Binomial name
- Trichostetha fascicularis (Donovan, 1805)

= Trichostetha fascicularis =

Species of beetle

Trichostetha fascicularis is a large, metallic-green beetle found in South Africa.

== Description ==
The Protea Beetle is about 25mm long. It has metallic-green wing cases with a black head and thorax which has two white vertical stripes. It has orange hairs growing around the bottom of its body.

== Habitat ==
It is found in South Africa wherever proteas occur. Adults feed on the pollen and nectar. They live in fynbos, mountainous habitats, and residential gardens if its food supply is available.

== Subspecies ==
Trichostetha fascicularis has four subspecies: (Note: T. fascicularis natalis and T. fascicularis prunipennis were reinstated as valid subspecies per Holm & Perissinotto, 2011. Older sources may still list these as invalid.)

- Trichostetha fascicularis maraisi Stobbia, 1995
- Trichostetha fascicularis natalis Burmeister, 1842
- Trichostetha fascicularis nigripennis Allard, 1992
- Trichostetha fascicularis prunipennis Burmeister, 1842
