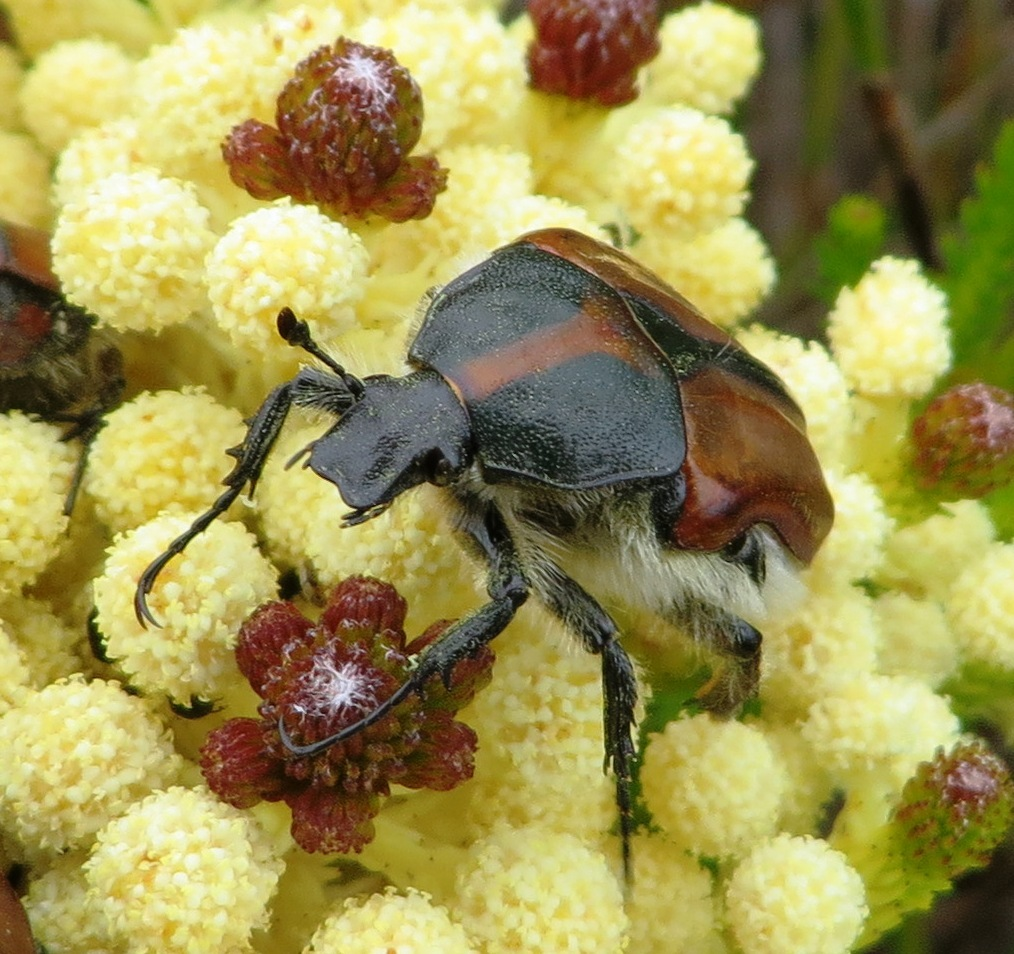
- Trichostetha capensis

Scientific classification
- Kingdom: Animalia
- Phylum: Arthropoda
- Class: Insecta
- Order: Coleoptera
- Suborder: Polyphaga
- Infraorder: Scarabaeiformia
- Family: Scarabaeidae
- Subfamily: Cetoniinae
- Tribe: Cetoniini
- Genus: Trichostetha; Burmeister, 1842

= Trichostetha =

Genus of beetles

Trichostetha (Greek 'hairy' + 'chest') is a genus of beetle in the scarab beetle family. It is endemic to southern Africa, and its species most commonly occur in mountainous terrain. The genus includes several species that have only recently been described, as well as many species lacking a description of any of the larval stages. Except for T. fascicularis and its subspecies, the species comprising Trichostetha have small ranges of distribution, frequently in the Cape Floral Region of South Africa. The genus is believed to be related to Odontorrhina.

== Species and subspecies ==
The genus Trichostetha includes the following species and subspecies:

- Trichostetha albopicta (Gory & Percheron, 1833)
- Trichostetha barbertonensis Holm & Marais, 1988
- Trichostetha bicolor Péringuey, 1907
- Trichostetha calciventris Stobbia, 1995
- Trichostetha capensis (Linnaeus, 1758)
  - Trichostema capensis capensis (Linnaeus, 1767)
  - Trichostema capensis hottentotta (Gory & Percheron, 1833)
  - Trichostema capensis oweni Allard, 1992
- Trichostetha coetzeri Holm & Marais, 1988
- Trichostetha curlei Perissinotto, Šípek & Ball, 2014
- Trichostetha dukei Holm & Marais, 1988
- Trichostetha fascicularis (Linnaeus, 1767)
  - Trichostetha fascicularis maraisi Stobbia, 1995
  - Trichostetha fascicularis natalis Burmeister, 1842
  - Trichostetha fascicularis nigripennis Allard, 1992
  - Trichostetha fascicularis prunipennis Burmeister, 1842
- Trichostetha fuscorubra (Voet, 1779)
- Trichostetha hawequas Holm & Perissinotto, 2004
- Trichostetha mimetica Devecis, 1997
- Trichostetha potbergensis Holm & Perissinotto, 2004
- Trichostetha signata (Fabricius, 1775)
  - Trichostema signata signata (Fabricius, 1775)
  - Trichostema signata tibialis Burmeister, 1842
