= List of cities and towns in Mpumalanga =

This is a list of cities and towns in Mpumalanga Province, South Africa.

In the case of settlements that have had their official names changed the traditional name is listed first followed by the new name.

== A ==
Town Name	District	Municipality	Remarks / New Name
Aankoms	Gert Sibande	Albert Luthuli	
Acornhoek	Ehlanzeni	Bushbuckridge	
Amersfoort	Gert Sibande	Pixley Ka Seme	
Amsterdam	Gert Sibande	Mkhondo	renamed eMvelo
Anysspruit	Gert Sibande	Mkhondo	
Argent			
Avoca			
Avontuur	Gert Sibande	Albert Luthuli	

== B ==
Town Name	District	Municipality	Remarks / New Name
Badplaas	Gert Sibande	Albert Luthuli	renamed eManzana
Balfour	Gert Sibande	Dipaleseng	
Balmoral	Nkangala	Emalahleni	
Bankkop			
Barberton	Ehlanzeni	Mbombela	
Belfast	Nkangala	Emakhazeni	
Berbice			
Bethal	Gert Sibande	Govan Mbeki	
Bettiesdam			
Branddraai			
Braunschweig			
Breyten	Gert Sibande	Msukaligwa	
Brondal			
Bushbuckridge	Ehlanzeni	Bushbuckridge	

== C ==
Town Name	District	Municipality
Carolina	Gert Sibande	Albert Luthuli
Chrissiesmeer	Gert Sibande	Msukaligwa

== D ==
Town Name	District	Municipality
Davel	Gert Sibande	Albert Luthuli
Delmas	Nkangala	Victor Khanye
Diepdale	Gert Sibande	Albert Luthuli
Diepgezet	Gert Sibande	Albert Luthuli
Dullstroom	Nkangala	Emakhazeni
Dundonald	Gert Sibande	Albert Luthuli

== E ==
Town Name	District	Municipality
Eerstehoek	Gert Sibande	Albert Luthuli
Ekulindeni	Gert Sibande	Albert Luthuli
Elukwatini	Gert Sibande	Albert Luthuli
Embalenhle	Gert Sibande	Govan Mbheki
Embhuleni	Gert Sibande	Albert Luthuli
Emphuluzi	Gert Sibande	Albert Luthuli
Enkhaba	Gert Sibande	Albert Luthuli
Ermelo	Gert Sibande	Msukaligwa

== F ==
Town Name	District	Municipality
Fernie	Gert Sibande	Albert Luthuli

== G ==
Town Name	District	Municipality	Remarks / New Name
Glenmore	Gert Sibande	Albert Luthuli	
Graskop	Ehlanzeni	Thaba Chweu	
Greylingstad	Gert Sibande	Dipaleseng	renamed Nthorwane

== H ==
Town Name	District	Municipality	Remarks / New Name
Hartebeeskop	Gert Sibande	Albert Luthuli	renamed Etjelembube
Hazyview	Ehlanzeni	Mbombela	
Hectorspruit	Ehlanzeni	Nkomazi	renamed Emjejane

== K ==
Town Name	District	Municipality
Kaapmuiden	Ehlanzeni	Nkomazi
Kinross	Gert Sibande	Govan Mbeki
Komatipoort	Ehlanzeni	Nkomazi
KwaMhlanga	Nkangala	Thembisile Hani
Kwaggafontein	Nkangala	Thembisile Hani

== L ==
Town Name	District	Municipality	Remarks / New Name
Lochiel	Gert Sibande	Albert Luthuli	
Loopspruit	Nkangala	Thembisile Hani	
Lydenburg	Ehlanzeni	Thaba Chweu	renamed Mashishing

== M ==
Town Name	District	Municipality	Remarks / New Name
Machadodorp	Nkangala	Emakhazeni	renamed eNtokozweni
Malelane	Ehlanzeni	Nkomazi	renamed Malalane
Matsulu	Ehlanzeni	Mbombela	
Mbhejeka	Gert Sibande	Albert Luthuli	
Middelburg	Nkangala	Steve Tshwete	
Moddergat	Gert Sibande	Albert Luthuli	
Mooiplaas	Gert Sibande	Albert Luthuli	
Morgenzon	Gert Sibande	Lekwa	

== N ==
Town Name	District	Municipality	Remarks / New Name
Nelspruit	Ehlanzeni	Mbombela	renamed Mbombela
Ngodwana	Ehlanzeni	Mbombela	

== P ==
Town Name	District	Municipality	Remarks / New Name
Perdekop	Gert Sibande	Pixley Ka Seme	
Piet Retief	Gert Sibande	Mkhondo	renamed eMkhondo
Pilgrim's Rest	Ehlanzeni	Thaba Chweu	

== S ==
Town Name	District	Municipality
Sabie	Ehlanzeni	Thaba Chweu
Secunda	Gert Sibande	Govan Mbeki
Siyabuswa	Nkangala	Dr JS Moroka
Skukuza	Ehlanzeni	Mbombela
Standerton	Gert Sibande	Lekwa

== T ==
Town Name	District	Municipality
Trichardt	Gert Sibande	Govan Mbeki

== V ==
Town Name	District	Municipality
Vaalbank	Nkangala	Dr JS Moroka
Volksrust	Gert Sibande	Pixley ka Seme

== W ==
Town Name	District	Municipality	Remarks / New Name
Wakkerstroom	Gert Sibande	Pixley ka Seme	
Waterval Boven	Nkangala	Emakhazeni	renamed Emgwenya
Waterval Onder	Nkangala	Emakhazeni	
White River	Ehlanzeni	Mbombela	
Witbank	Nkangala	Emalahleni	renamed eMalahleni

== Sortable list ==
Town Name
Aankoms
Acornhoek
Amersfoort
Amsterdam (eMvelo)
Anysspruit
Argent
Avoca
Avontuur
Badplaas (eManzana)
Balfour
Balmoral
Bankkop
Barberton
Belfast
Berbice
Bethal
Bettiesdam
Branddraai
Braunschweig
Breyten
Brondal
Bushbuckridge
Carolina
Chrissiesmeer
Davale
Delmas
Diepdale (Etikhulungwane)
Diepgezet
Dullstroom
Dundonald
Eerstehoek (Nhlazatshe)
Ekulindeni
Elukwatini
Embhuleni
Emphuluzi
Enkhaba
Ermelo
Fernie
Glenmore
Graskop
Greylingstad (Nthorwane)
Hartebeeskop (Etjelembube)
Hazyview
Hectorspruit (Emjejane)
Kaapmuiden
Kinross
Komatipoort
KwaMhlanga
Lochiel
Loopspruit
Lydenburg (Mashishing)
Machadodorp (eNotkozweni)
Malelane (Malalane)
Mbhejeka
Middelburg
Moddergat
Nelspruit (Mbombela)
Ngodwana
Ohrigstad
Perdekop
Piet Retief (eMkhondo)
Pilgrim's Rest
Sabie
Secunda
Siyabuswa
Skukuza
Standerton
Trichardt
Vaalbank (Libangeni)
Volksrust
Wakkerstroom
Waterval Boven (Emgwenya)
Waterval Onder
White River
Witbank (eMalahleni)
