= Wakkerstroom =

Wakkerstroom Mhlongamvula
- Location within Mpumalanga Location within South Africa
- Coordinates: 27°21′09″S 30°08′44″E
- Country: South Africa
- Province: Mpumalanga
- District: Gert Sibande
- Municipality: Pixley ka Seme

Area
  - Total: 87.68 km^{2} (33.85 sq mi)
- Elevation: 1,760 m (5,770 ft)

Population (2011)
  - Total: 6,852
  - Density: 78.15/km^{2} (202.4/sq mi)

Racial makeup (2011)
  - Black African: 87.8%
  - White: 10.2%
  - Indian/Asian: 1.3%
  - Coloured: 0.3%
  - Other: 0.4%

First languages (2011)
  - Zulu: 86.2%
  - English: 4.2%
  - Afrikaans: 3.7%
  - S. Ndebele: 1.6%
  - Other: 4.2%
- Time zone: UTC+2 (SAST)
- Postal code (street): 2480
- PO box: 2480
- Area code: 017

Wakkerstroom (Awake Stream) is the second oldest town in Mpumalanga province, South Africa. The town is on the KwaZulu-Natal border, 27 km east of Volksrust and 56 km south-east of Amersfoort.

== History ==
The settlement was laid out on the farm Gryshoek by Dirk Cornelis (Swart Dirk) Uys (1814–1910), proclaimed in 1859 by President Pretorius, and administered by a village council from 1910. Swart Dirk Uys, who surveyed the property using a 50-yard thong made from an eland he shot on arrival, originally named the town Uysenburg, but the name was changed by the Executive Council of the South African Republic to Marthinus-Wesselstroom, after the president's first names, and also known as Wesselstroom.

In 1904, the name of the town was changed again to Wakkerstroom, meaning "awake stream" or "lively stream", which is an Afrikaans translation of the Zulu name for the river uThaka (English: awake) that flows near the town.

The courthouse, St. Mark's Church, and the old bridge over the river have been declared national monuments. H. Rider Haggard's novel She: A History of Adventure was written while he lived on Hoog Street. The bridge dates to 1893, when it was built under the South African Republic from German steel. South Africa's first black member of the Christ Community Church was baptized by Reverend D. Bryant in 1904.

=== First Boer War ===
Wakkerstroom was occupied by the 58th (Rutlandshire) Regiment of Foot, the 80th Regiment of Foot (Staffordshire Volunteers), and 1st King's Dragoon Guards in 1880–1881 during the First Boer War. Remains of the Staffordshire and Dragoon encampments can be found on the slopes of the Ossewakop and Voortrekkerkop passes south of town.

=== Second Boer War ===
During the Second Boer War, the British built twenty-one blockhouses between Volksrust and Wakkerstroom and a hundred between Wakkerstroom and Piet Retief, Mpumalanga. The blockhouses were built to guard the British supply lines from Durban.

== Economy ==
Sheep and cattle farming are the primary industries. Proposed coal mining in the area has raised concerns due to the environmental sensitivity of the region.

== Environment ==
With the Balele Mountains to the south, the area surrounding the town is mountainous with kloofs, mountain springs, vlei areas, dams, conservation and heritage sites. It is internationally renowned as a "birder's paradise". Due to the high occurrence of high priority wetlands and the proximity to the sources of three rivers, the Vaal, Tugela (via Buffalo tributary) and Pongola, it was declared a National Freshwater Ecosystem Priority Area. It is also a protected area under the Protected Areas Act, which means that mining is generally not allowed.

The Yzermyn project of Uthaka Energy (Pty) Ltd, a coal-mining company, was put on hold in 2021, after a coalition of civil society organisations objected to mining in one of South Africa's critical water source areas.

== Culture ==
Since 2012, an annual classical music festival is hosted in Wakkerstroom. The festival makes use of a variety of venues across the town and draws acts and visitors from across the country. Performances are mostly presented by soloists and chamber groups, but larger groups have also been included.

== See also ==
- Wakkerstroom public library

== Sources ==
- Erasmus, B.P.J. (1995). Op Pad in Suid-Afrika. New York: Jonathan Ball. ISBN 1-86842-026-4
- Rosenthal, Eric (1967). Ensiklopedie van Suidelike Afrika. London: Frederick Warne.
