= Wakkerstroom public library =

Community library in Wakkerstroom, South Africa

Coordinates: 27°21′21″S 30°08′31″E

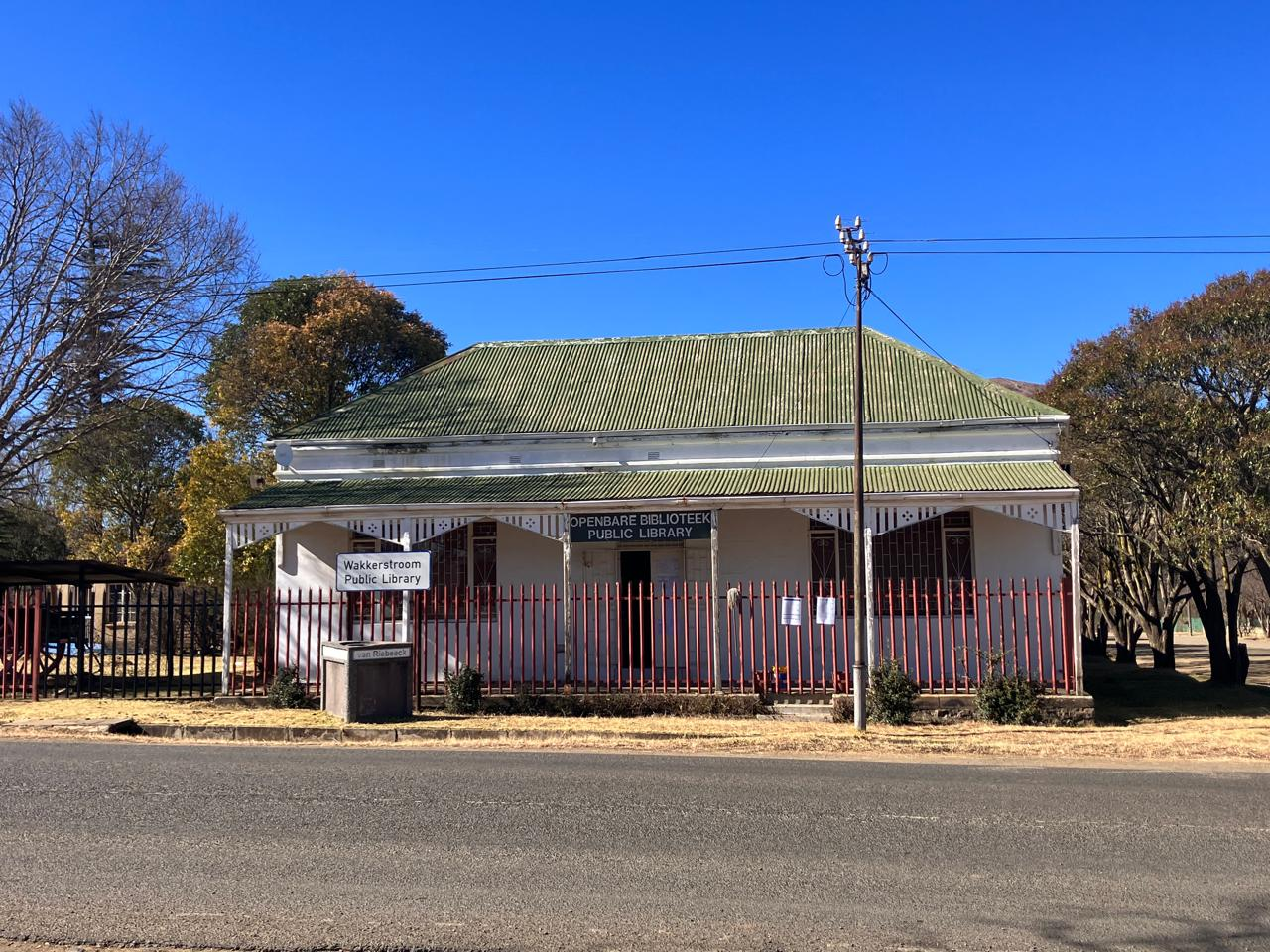
Wakkerstroom Public Library

The Wakkerstroom Public Library is a South African community library located in the village of Wakkerstroom in the Pixley ka Seme Local Municipality (Gert Sibande District Municipality).

Wakkerstroom itself has existed as a town since 1859, it was then known as Marthinus Wessel Stroom, in honour of the president of the South African Republic at that time.

The library was established in 1890.

The library provides local historical research, cultural enrichment, and community engagement. This is a library that serves all residents of the Pixley ka Seme municipality, addresses apartheid’s legacy.
