= R541 (South Africa) =

Regional route in South Africa

Regional route R541

Route information
- Length: 94 km (58 mi)

Major junctions
- North-west end: R36 in Machadodorp
- R38 in Badplaas
- South-east end: N17 in Lochiel

Location
- Country: South Africa

Highway system
- Numbered routes of South Africa
← R540	→ R542

The R541 is a Regional Route in Mpumalanga, South Africa that connects Machadodorp with Lochiel.

== Route ==
Its north-western origin is a junction with the R36 in Machadodorp, just east of the R36's junction with the N4. It begins by heading east as Molen Street and then north as Potgieter Street before bending to the south-east as the Skurweberg Pass, heading for 50 kilometres to reach a junction with the R38. The R541 joins the R38 and they are co-signed for 6 kilometres heading south-west to Badplaas, where the R541 splits to become the road to the south-east. It heads for 20 kilometres to reach a junction west of Nhlazatshe, where it turns to the south. It heads for another 18 kilometres to reach its end in Lochiel at an intersection with the N17.
