= Bettysgoed =

- Location within Mpumalanga Location within South Africa
- Coordinates: 26.252°S 30.908°E
- Country: South Africa
- Province: Mpumalanga
- District: Gert Sibande
- Municipality: Albert Luthuli

Area
  - Total: 2.23 km^{2} (0.86 sq mi)

Population (2011)
  - Total: 1,489
  - Density: 668/km^{2} (1,730/sq mi)

Racial makeup (2011)
  - Black African: 98.5%
  - Coloured: 0.3%
  - Indian/Asian: 0.2%
  - White: 0.9%
  - Other: 0.1%

First languages (2011)
  - Zulu: 75.7%
  - Swazi: 20.0%
  - English: 3.0%
  - Other: 1.3%
- Time zone: UTC+2 (SAST)
- Postal code (street): 2336
- PO box: 2335

Bettysgoed is a town in Gert Sibande District Municipality in the Mpumalanga province of South Africa.
