= Manaar =

- Location within Mpumalanga Location within South Africa
- Coordinates: 26.053°S 31.029°E
- Country: South Africa
- Province: Mpumalanga
- District: Gert Sibande
- Municipality: Albert Luthuli

Area
  - Total: 8.55 km^{2} (3.30 sq mi)

Population (2011)
  - Total: 965
  - Density: 113/km^{2} (292/sq mi)

Racial makeup (2011)
  - Black African: 100.0%

First languages (2011)
  - Swazi: 97.8%
  - Other: 2.2%
- Time zone: UTC+2 (SAST)

Manaar is a town in Gert Sibande District Municipality in the Mpumalanga province of South Africa.
