= Mabhuza Ginindza =

South African politician (1953–2018)

Personal details
- Born: Mabhuza Simeon Ginindza; 5 October 1953 Nhlazatshe, Eastern Transvaal, South Africa
- Died: 14 October 2018 (aged 65) Nhlazatshe, Mpumalanga, South Africa
- Cause of death: Natural
- Citizenship: South Africa
- Party: African National Congress
- Education: Diploma of education
- Alma mater: Umgwenya College of Education
- Occupation: Politician
- Profession: School teacher

Mabhuza Simeon Ginindza ( 5 October 1953 – 14 October 2018) was a South African politician. He was born in Eerstehoek (now Nhlazatshe) and served both in the Apartheid homeland administration and the post-Apartheid ANC government that elected Nelson Mandela as the first black President in 1994.

Ginindza served as member of Parliament for the African National Congress (ANC) from 1994 to 2009, having served for the KaNgwane bantustan administration as councillor and legislative member

He also served as deputy finance minister, minister of justice and police as well as minister of public works for the KaNgwane government between 1988 and 1994.

== Early life and education ==
Ginindza was born in a village called Nhlazatje (Eerstehoek) in the Chief Albert Luthuli Local Municipality on 5 October 1953. Because he was confined in a space where he had to look after his father's livestock, and also because there were no schools in the Eerstehoek farm where he was born, Ginindza started school at the age of 12 in 1965.

He finished his Standard 10 (Grade12) at Thembeka Senior Secondary School in KaNyamazane. He was a teacher by profession from Umgwenya College of Education.

== Political career ==
Ginindza began his political career from the Inyandza National Movement, which was a ruling party of the KaNgwane bantustan. He served as administrative secretary for the movement and worked with Enos John Mabuza and Chief of Embhuleni, Prince Johannes Mkolishi Dlamini.

In the South African Historical Journal published by the University of South Africa in March 2012, Ginindza writes that he became a public representative for a period of 26 years – starting from 1983 to 2009.

He served one term as a councillor in Matsulu (1983 – 1988), one term as a member of the KaNgwane Legislative Assembly (1988 – 1994) and three terms as member of Parliament in the new South Africa (1994 – 2009).

He was named MEC for housing by then Premier Ndaweni Mahlangu, taking over from DD Mabuza who got redeployed to Parliament. He also served four terms as the chairperson of the African National Congress (ANC) in the Gert Sibande region – two while the region was called Badplaas region and another two when it merged with other regions to be called Gert Sibande region.

In 2015, Ginindza became a member of the Save ANC Mpumalanga, publicly slamming the "sidelining of good comrades" by then ANC provincial leader Mabuza.

"Good comrades have been sidelined in this glorious movement of the people, for the people. The ANC is not the ANC we know", Ginindza said then.

=== Positions served in KaNgwane government ===
- Deputy finance minister (1988 to 1990)
- Minister of justice and police (1990 to 1992)
- Minister of public works (1992 to 1993)
- Minister of agriculture and forestry (1993 to 1994)

=== Positions served in post-Apartheid South Africa ===
- Member of Parliament for the ANC (1994 to 2009)
- MEC of the Mpumalanga department of housing and land (2001 to 2004)
- Chairperson of Parliament health committee portfolio (2004 to 2008)
- Mpumalanga legislature chief whip – (2008 to 2009)

=== Other career ===
- School teacher (1980 to 1988)
- Principal for Matsulu Centre for Adult Education (1985 to 1988)
