= Dundonald =

Dundonald may refer to:

== Places ==
=== Canada ===
- Dundonald, Ontario, Cramahe
- Dundonald, Saskatoon, Saskatchewan
- Dundonald Park, in Ottawa

=== South Africa ===
- Dundonald, Mpumalanga

=== United Kingdom ===
- Dundonald, County Down, Northern Ireland
  - Dundonald railway station
- Dundonald, County Antrim, a townland in Northern Ireland
- Dundonald, Fife, Cardenden, Scotland
- Dundonald, South Ayrshire, Scotland
  - Dundonald Castle
  - RAF Dundonald
- Dundonald Castle, Kintyre, Argyll and Bute, Scotland
- Dundonald House, Belfast, Northern Ireland
- Dundonald Church, London, England
- Wimbledon Town and Dundonald (ward), electoral ward in London

== Other uses ==
- Dundonald (ship), a ship wrecked off Disappointment Island in 1907
- Earl of Dundonald, a title in the peerage of Scotland

== See also ==
- Dundonald Bluebell F.C., a football club in Fife, Scotland
