= Mkhondo Local Municipality elections =

The Mkhondo Local Municipality is a Local Municipality in Mpumalanga, South Africa. The council consists of thirty-eight members elected by mixed-member proportional representation. Nineteen councillors are elected by first-past-the-post voting in nineteen wards, while the remaining nineteen are chosen from party lists so that the total number of party representatives is proportional to the number of votes received. In the election of 1 November 2021 the African National Congress (ANC) won a majority of twenty-one seats.

== Results ==
The following table shows the composition of the council after past elections.

Event	ANC	DA	EFF	FF+	IFP	NFP	PAC	Other	Total
2000 election	21	6	—	—	3	—	—	—	30
2006 election	23	3	—	1	2	—	1	0	30
2011 election	28	6	—	0	1	2	1	0	38
2016 election	29	4	3	0	1	—	—	1	38
2021 election	21	4	7	1	1	1	—	3	38

== December 2000 election ==
The following table shows the results of the 2000 election.

Party	Ward			List			Total seats
Party	Votes	%	Seats	Votes	%	Seats	Total seats
African National Congress	15,557	68.22	14	15,621	68.52	7	21
Democratic Alliance	4,654	20.41	1	4,597	20.16	5	6
Inkatha Freedom Party	2,593	11.37	0	2,579	11.31	3	3
Total	22,804	100.00	15	22,797	100.00	15	30
Valid votes	22,804	97.01		22,797	97.12		
Invalid/blank votes	703	2.99		676	2.88		
Total votes	23,507	100.00		23,473	100.00		
Registered voters/turnout	48,235	48.73		48,235	48.66		

== March 2006 election ==
The following table shows the results of the 2006 election.

Party	Ward			List			Total seats
Party	Votes	%	Seats	Votes	%	Seats	Total seats
African National Congress	22,503	75.71	14	22,931	77.57	9	23
Democratic Alliance	2,898	9.75	1	2,840	9.61	2	3
Inkatha Freedom Party	2,040	6.86	0	2,031	6.87	2	2
Pan Africanist Congress of Azania	462	1.55	0	439	1.48	1	1
Freedom Front Plus	405	1.36	0	452	1.53	1	1
Independent candidates	759	2.55	0				0
African Christian Democratic Party	287	0.97	0	351	1.19	0	0
Independent Democrats	279	0.94	0	305	1.03	0	0
National Democratic Convention	88	0.30	0	214	0.72	0	0
Total	29,721	100.00	15	29,563	100.00	15	30
Valid votes	29,721	97.90		29,563	97.53		
Invalid/blank votes	636	2.10		748	2.47		
Total votes	30,357	100.00		30,311	100.00		
Registered voters/turnout	57,492	52.80		57,492	52.72		

== May 2011 election ==
The following table shows the results of the 2011 election.

Party	Ward			List			Total seats
Party	Votes	%	Seats	Votes	%	Seats	Total seats
African National Congress	26,819	72.09	18	27,181	72.87	10	28
Democratic Alliance	6,171	16.59	1	6,170	16.54	5	6
National Freedom Party	1,886	5.07	0	1,785	4.79	2	2
Inkatha Freedom Party	1,336	3.59	0	1,267	3.40	1	1
Pan Africanist Congress of Azania	607	1.63	0	428	1.15	1	1
Freedom Front Plus	287	0.77	0	234	0.63	0	0
Congress of the People	96	0.26	0	237	0.64	0	0
Total	37,202	100.00	19	37,302	100.00	19	38
Valid votes	37,202	98.08		37,302	98.35		
Invalid/blank votes	727	1.92		627	1.65		
Total votes	37,929	100.00		37,929	100.00		
Registered voters/turnout	63,859	59.39		63,859	59.39		

== August 2016 election ==
The following table shows the results of the 2016 election.

Party	Ward			List			Total seats
Party	Votes	%	Seats	Votes	%	Seats	Total seats
African National Congress	30,661	75.86	18	31,143	76.96	11	29
Democratic Alliance	4,120	10.19	1	4,196	10.37	3	4
Economic Freedom Fighters	2,764	6.84	0	2,708	6.69	3	3
Inkatha Freedom Party	985	2.44	0	975	2.41	1	1
African People's Convention	684	1.69	0	779	1.93	1	1
Freedom Front Plus	462	1.14	0	578	1.43	0	0
Independent candidates	683	1.69	0				0
Pan African Socialist Movement of Azania	60	0.15	0	88	0.22	0	0
Total	40,419	100.00	19	40,467	100.00	19	38
Valid votes	40,419	98.18		40,467	98.18		
Invalid/blank votes	749	1.82		752	1.82		
Total votes	41,168	100.00		41,219	100.00		
Registered voters/turnout	71,990	57.19		71,990	57.26		

== November 2021 election ==
The following table shows the results of the 2021 election.

Party	Ward			List			Total seats
Party	Votes	%	Seats	Votes	%	Seats	Total seats
African National Congress	15,043	50.57	16	17,048	57.52	5	21
Economic Freedom Fighters	4,944	16.62	0	5,856	19.76	7	7
Democratic Alliance	2,634	8.85	1	3,115	10.51	3	4
Independent candidates	4,473	15.04	2				2
Inkatha Freedom Party	812	2.73	0	1,114	3.76	1	1
Freedom Front Plus	796	2.68	0	1,027	3.47	1	1
African Transformation Movement	478	1.61	0	670	2.26	1	1
National Freedom Party	228	0.77	0	393	1.33	1	1
African People's Convention	273	0.92	0	245	0.83	0	0
Abantu Batho Congress	68	0.23	0	168	0.57	0	0
Total	29,749	100.00	19	29,636	100.00	19	38
Valid votes	29,749	97.88		29,636	96.23		
Invalid/blank votes	645	2.12		1,160	3.77		
Total votes	30,394	100.00		30,796	100.00		
Registered voters/turnout	70,522	43.10		70,522	43.67		

=== By-elections from November 2021 ===
The following by-elections were held to fill vacant ward seats in the period since the election in November 2021.

Date	Ward	Party of the previous councillor	Party of the newly elected councillor
23 Nov 2022	15	African National Congress	African National Congress
14 Dec 2022	3	African National Congress	African National Congress
14 Dec 2022	4	African National Congress	African National Congress
14 Dec 2022	13	African National Congress	African National Congress
14 Dec 2022	16	African National Congress	African National Congress
14 Dec 2022	18	African National Congress	African National Congress
5 Apr 2023	1	African National Congress	African National Congress
5 Apr 2023	2	African National Congress	African National Congress
5 Apr 2023	19	African National Congress	African National Congress
28 Jun 2023	12	African National Congress	African National Congress
17 Dec 2025	17	Independent politician	African National Congress

Although the ANC had a majority in the council, an independent mayor and an ATM speaker were elected, after ANC factions could not agree on a single candidate for the positions. The ANC expelled 6 councillors, including the former mayor. While one was a PR councillor, and was replaced by the party, five were ward councillors, resulting in by-elections on 14 December 2022. The ANC candidates won all five seats, restoring the party's majority in the council.
