= Steynsdorp =

- Location within Mpumalanga Location within South Africa
- Coordinates: 26.133°S 30.983°E
- Country: South Africa
- Province: Mpumalanga
- District: Gert Sibande
- Municipality: Albert Luthuli

Area
  - Total: 1.14 km^{2} (0.44 sq mi)

Population (2001)
  - Total: 585
  - Density: 513/km^{2} (1,330/sq mi)

Racial makeup (2001)
  - Black African: 100.0%

First languages (2001)
  - Swazi: 91.8%
  - Zulu: 8.2%
- Time zone: UTC+2 (SAST)

Steynsdorp, officially eMlondozi, is a settlement in Gert Sibande District Municipality in the Mpumalanga province of South Africa.

It was founded in 1885 and became the centre of the New Paarl goldfield but was abandoned when the Witwatersrand goldfields were discovered.

At first called Painter's Camp, it was named Steynsburg in 1886, after Commandant J P Steyn of Lydenburg. The name was then altered to Steynsdorp to avoid confusion with Steynsburg in the Cape, now Eastern Cape.
