= Msukaligwa Local Municipality elections =

The Msukaligwa Local Municipality is a Local Municipality in Mpumalanga, South Africa. The council consists of thirty-eight members elected by mixed-member proportional representation. Nineteen councillors are elected by first-past-the-post voting in nineteen wards, while the remaining nineteen are chosen from party lists so that the total number of party representatives is proportional to the number of votes received. In the election of 1 November 2021 the African National Congress (ANC) won a majority of twenty-four seats.

== Results ==
The following table shows the composition of the council after past elections.

Event	ANC	DA	EFF	FF+	PAC	Other	Total
2000 election	25	4	—	—	1	2	32
2006 election	26	3	—	1	1	1	32
2011 election	31	5	—	1	0	1	38
2016 election	29	5	3	1	—	0	38
2021 election	24	4	7	2	—	1	38

== December 2000 election ==
The following table shows the results of the 2000 election.

Party	Ward			List			Total seats
Party	Votes	%	Seats	Votes	%	Seats	Total seats
African National Congress	18,500	76.09	13	18,805	77.37	12	25
Democratic Alliance	2,324	9.56	2	3,155	12.98	2	4
Hoëveldrif Inwoners Vereniging	1,862	7.66	1	1,072	4.41	1	2
Pan Africanist Congress of Azania	995	4.09	0	926	3.81	1	1
Inkatha Freedom Party	249	1.02	0	348	1.43	0	0
Independent candidates	384	1.58	0				0
Total	24,314	100.00	16	24,306	100.00	16	32
Valid votes	24,314	96.73		24,306	96.93		
Invalid/blank votes	823	3.27		770	3.07		
Total votes	25,137	100.00		25,076	100.00		
Registered voters/turnout	52,641	47.75		52,641	47.64		

== March 2006 election ==
The following table shows the results of the 2006 election.

Party	Ward			List			Total seats
Party	Votes	%	Seats	Votes	%	Seats	Total seats
African National Congress	21,691	80.24	14	21,997	81.18	12	26
Democratic Alliance	2,934	10.85	2	2,824	10.42	1	3
Freedom Front Plus	827	3.06	0	740	2.73	1	1
Pan Africanist Congress of Azania	793	2.93	0	747	2.76	1	1
Inkatha Freedom Party	426	1.58	0	274	1.01	1	1
African Christian Democratic Party	274	1.01	0	308	1.14	0	0
Socialist Party of Azania	69	0.26	0	205	0.76	0	0
United Christian Democratic Party	20	0.07	0				0
Total	27,034	100.00	16	27,095	100.00	16	32
Valid votes	27,034	97.68		27,095	97.83		
Invalid/blank votes	643	2.32		602	2.17		
Total votes	27,677	100.00		27,697	100.00		
Registered voters/turnout	56,649	48.86		56,649	48.89		

== May 2011 election ==
The following table shows the results of the 2011 election.

Party	Ward			List			Total seats
Party	Votes	%	Seats	Votes	%	Seats	Total seats
African National Congress	28,041	80.69	17	28,467	81.47	14	31
Democratic Alliance	4,904	14.11	2	4,771	13.65	3	5
Freedom Front Plus	738	2.12	0	471	1.35	1	1
Congress of the People	332	0.96	0	355	1.02	1	1
Pan Africanist Congress of Azania	325	0.94	0	286	0.82	0	0
National Freedom Party	160	0.46	0	323	0.92	0	0
Inkatha Freedom Party	206	0.59	0	176	0.50	0	0
Federal Congress	44	0.13	0	91	0.26	0	0
Total	34,750	100.00	19	34,940	100.00	19	38
Valid votes	34,750	98.10		34,940	98.50		
Invalid/blank votes	674	1.90		533	1.50		
Total votes	35,424	100.00		35,473	100.00		
Registered voters/turnout	62,384	56.78		62,384	56.86		

== August 2016 election ==
The following table shows the results of the 2016 election.

Party	Ward			List			Total seats
Party	Votes	%	Seats	Votes	%	Seats	Total seats
African National Congress	30,071	74.72	18	30,249	74.90	11	29
Democratic Alliance	5,452	13.55	1	5,421	13.42	4	5
Economic Freedom Fighters	3,165	7.86	0	3,087	7.64	3	3
Freedom Front Plus	761	1.89	0	707	1.75	1	1
Inkatha Freedom Party	190	0.47	0	228	0.56	0	0
African People's Convention	172	0.43	0	228	0.56	0	0
African Christian Democratic Party	172	0.43	0	165	0.41	0	0
Congress of the People	164	0.41	0	135	0.33	0	0
Sindawonye Progressive Party	48	0.12	0	126	0.31	0	0
Pan African Socialist Movement of Azania	52	0.13	0	41	0.10	0	0
Total	40,247	100.00	19	40,387	100.00	19	38
Valid votes	40,247	98.61		40,387	98.68		
Invalid/blank votes	566	1.39		540	1.32		
Total votes	40,813	100.00		40,927	100.00		
Registered voters/turnout	71,337	57.21		71,337	57.37		

== November 2021 election ==
The following table shows the results of the 2021 election.

Party	Ward			List			Total seats
Party	Votes	%	Seats	Votes	%	Seats	Total seats
African National Congress	16,334	59.46	18	16,992	62.55	6	24
Economic Freedom Fighters	4,676	17.02	0	4,676	17.21	7	7
Democratic Alliance	2,672	9.73	1	2,763	10.17	3	4
Freedom Front Plus	1,677	6.10	0	1,546	5.69	2	2
Independent candidates	1,253	4.56	0				0
African Christian Democratic Party	326	1.19	0	370	1.36	1	1
Inkatha Freedom Party	229	0.83	0	363	1.34	0	0
African Transformation Movement	174	0.63	0	216	0.80	0	0
United Independent Movement	91	0.33	0	146	0.54	0	0
African Freedom Revolution	12	0.04	0	59	0.22	0	0
African People's Movement	27	0.10	0	35	0.13	0	0
Total	27,471	100.00	19	27,166	100.00	19	38
Valid votes	27,471	97.90		27,166	96.71		
Invalid/blank votes	589	2.10		923	3.29		
Total votes	28,060	100.00		28,089	100.00		
Registered voters/turnout	69,662	40.28		69,662	40.32		

=== By-elections from November 2021 ===
The following by-elections were held to fill vacant ward seats in the period from November 2021.

Date	Ward	Party of the previous councillor	Party of the newly elected councillor
11 Oct 2023	13	African National Congress	Economic Freedom Fighters
8 Nov 2023	9	African National Congress	African National Congress
23 Oct 2024	7	Democratic Alliance	Democratic Alliance
