= Perdekop =

- Location within Mpumalanga Location within South Africa
- Coordinates: 27°10′S 29°38′E
- Country: South Africa
- Province: Mpumalanga
- District: Gert Sibande
- Municipality: Pixley Ka Seme

Area
  - Total: 7.73 km^{2} (2.98 sq mi)
- Elevation: 1,889 m (6,198 ft)

Population (2011)
  - Total: 5,081
  - Density: 657/km^{2} (1,700/sq mi)

Racial makeup (2011)
  - Black African: 97.4%
  - Coloured: 0.3%
  - Indian/Asian: 1.7%
  - White: 0.4%
  - Other: 0.2%

First languages (2011)
  - Zulu: 82.3%
  - Sotho: 9.9%
  - English: 1.7%
  - S. Ndebele: 1.5%
  - Other: 4.6%
- Time zone: UTC+2 (SAST)
- Postal code (street): 2465
- PO box: 2465
- Area code: 017

Perdekop, (Afrikaans for horses hill), is a small town situated on top of a 1,889 m peak in the Mpumalanga province, in South Africa. It is a village 38 km north of Volksrust and 47 km south of Standerton.

== History ==
Formerly Paardekop, ‘horses hill’, from the practice of keeping horses there when horse-sickness prevailed in lower lying areas.

The town was established during an equine sickness epidemic when farmers found that when they brought their horses to the top of this hill they were protected from the sickness. During the Second Boer War the British operated a lookout balloon here to monitor Boer activities.
