= Diepdale =

Diepdale Etikhulungwane
- Location within Mpumalanga Location within South Africa
- Coordinates: 26.4592°S 30.7975°E
- Country: South Africa
- Province: Mpumalanga
- District: Gert Sibande
- Municipality: Albert Luthuli
- Established: 1979

Government
  - Chief: Chief T.D Nkosi

Area
  - Total: 7.55 km^{2} (2.92 sq mi)

Population (2011)
  - Total: 6,768
  - Density: 896/km^{2} (2,320/sq mi)

Racial makeup (2011)
  - Black African: 99.5%
  - Coloured: 0.2%
  - Indian/Asian: 0.2%

First languages (2011)
  - Zulu: 58.2%
  - Swazi: 39.3%
  - Other: 2.6%
- Time zone: UTC+2 (SAST)
- Postal code (street): 2341

Diepdale is a town in Gert Sibande District Municipality in the Mpumalanga province of South Africa.
