= Sizwe Sama Yende =

South African journalist (born 1977)

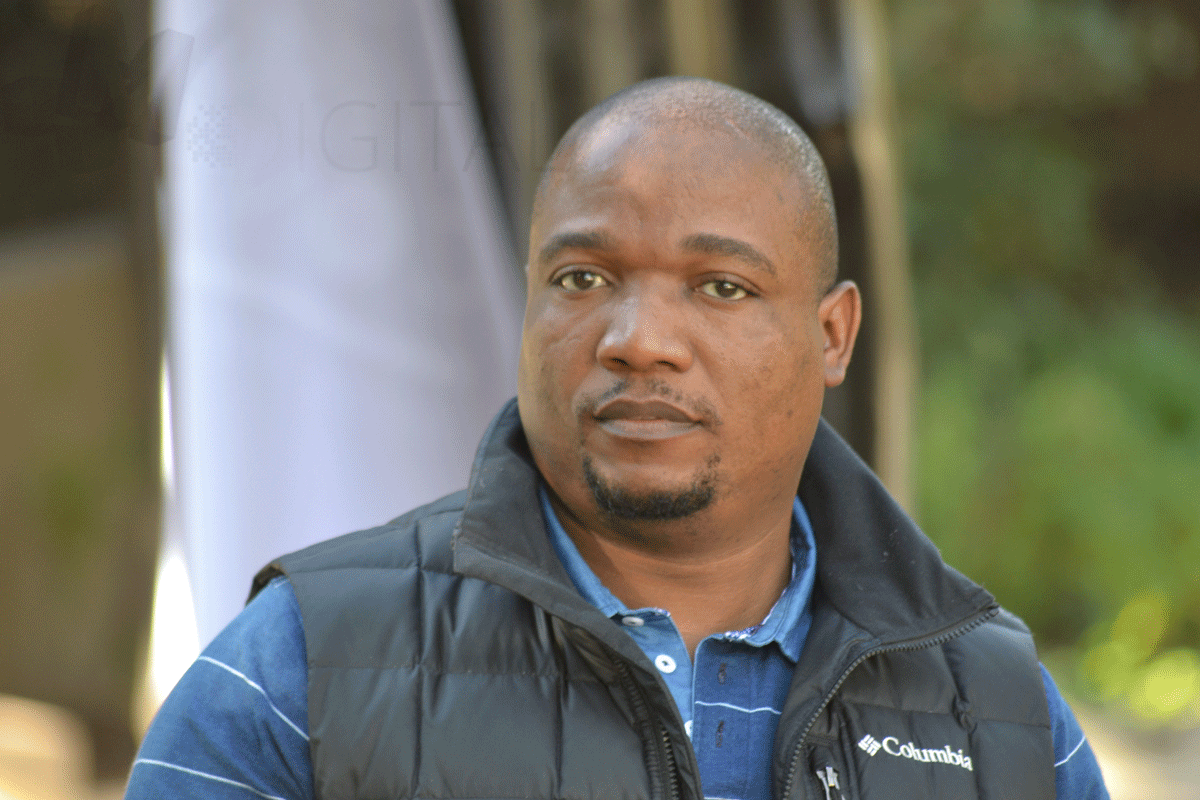
- Yende in 2017
- Born: Sizwe Petrus Yende; August 29, 1977 (age 48); Daggakraal, Pixley Ka Seme Local Municipality
- Occupation: Journalist
- Organization: The People's Eye

Sizwe Petrus Yende (born 29 August 1977) is a South African journalist and author of Eerie Assignment. He was the chief correspondent for the City Press in Mpumalanga until 2024 and is known for his investigative and political reporting. He is the founder of The People's Eye.

His memoir, Eerie Assignment, chronicles his experiences as a journalist in Mpumalanga, exposing corruption while facing intimidation in a province notorious for politically motivated assassinations.

== Career ==
Sama Yende began his journalism career in the late 1990s at the now-defunct Mpumalanga news agency, African Eye News Service (AENS). He was recruited by Mzilikazi wa Afrika, who had traveled to Daggakraal to cover President Nelson Mandela's visit for AENS. In the foreword of Eerie Assignment (2017), Wa Afrika recalled their first meeting:

To my surprise, the young man, full of shyness and speaking with his right hand on his mouth, said: "I want to be a journalist like you". I spoke to the teenager for about 15 minutes and I realised that although he was 18 years old he had an extraordinary agility of mind and passion for journalism. He was a local Daggakraal boy.

Three weeks later, Wa Afrika introduced Yende to AENS editor Justin Arenstein, who agreed to accept him on the condition that Wa Afrika would mentor him. Yende spent nine years at AENS, starting in 1997. He briefly left in 2004 to work for the Wits Institute for Social and Economic Research but returned to AENS a year later.

In 2006, he became City Press's Limpopo bureau chief. He later worked as a media officer for the Sekhukhune District Municipality in Limpopo for three years before returning to City Press as its chief correspondent in Mpumalanga. He is currently the founder and publisher of The People's Eye.

== Threats and intimidation ==
Sizwe Sama Yende has faced multiple threats throughout his career as an investigative journalist, particularly in Mpumalanga, where he reported on political corruption and tender irregularities.

On 6 August 2010, Yende was accosted by a lone gunman at his home in Nelspruit, Mpumalanga. He had just returned from a late-night meeting with a source when an armed man approached him as he was closing his sliding door. The assailant ordered him not to close the door, but Yende managed to lock it, retreat to a bedroom, and activate his security alarm. The attacker fled when the alarm sounded.

Following the attack, Yende was placed under 24-hour police protection. He described the growing dangers of investigative journalism in Mpumalanga, where sources feared surveillance and preferred late-night meetings to avoid detection.

On 10 December 2010, Yende laid a corruption charge against Mabutho Sithole, spokesperson for then-Mpumalanga Premier David Mabuza, after Sithole allegedly offered him a R5,000 bribe to suppress a story. The report involved a R230 million tender awarded to Mabuza’s former business partner, Patrick Chirwa, under questionable circumstances. Sithole was formally charged with corruption and released on R6,000 bail. His case was transferred to the regional court for further investigation.

In January 2011, Yende discovered that the brake cable of the company car he used had been deliberately cut. He first noticed brake failure on 6 December 2010 and sent the vehicle to Imperial Toyota in Nelspruit for inspection. A Toyota spokesperson confirmed that the brake pipe had been intentionally severed using a tool like a hacksaw or side cutter. A police officer investigating Yende’s previous cases advised him to register the incident in the police information book, allowing for an official case to be opened should further evidence emerge.
