= Mooiplaas, Mpumalanga =

Mooiplaas
- Location within Mpumalanga Location within South Africa
- Coordinates: 25.956°S 30.578°E
- Country: South Africa
- Province: Mpumalanga
- District: Gert Sibande
- Municipality: Albert Luthuli

Area
  - Total: 9.24 km^{2} (3.57 sq mi)

Population (2011)
  - Total: 4,196
  - Density: 454/km^{2} (1,180/sq mi)

Racial makeup (2011)
  - Black African: 99.8%
  - White: 0.1%

First languages (2011)
  - Swazi: 95.5%
  - Zulu: 2.1%
  - Other: 2.4%
- Time zone: UTC+2 (SAST)
- PO box: 5288
- Area code: 043

Mooiplaas is a town in Gert Sibande District Municipality in the Mpumalanga province of South Africa.
