= Moddergat, Mpumalanga =

Moddergat
- Location within Mpumalanga Location within South Africa
- Coordinates: 26.131°S 30.934°E
- Country: South Africa
- Province: Mpumalanga
- District: Gert Sibande
- Municipality: Albert Luthuli

Area
  - Total: 36.60 km^{2} (14.13 sq mi)

Population (2001)
  - Total: 592
  - Density: 16.2/km^{2} (41.9/sq mi)
- Time zone: UTC+2 (SAST)

Moddergat is a village in Gert Sibande District Municipality in the Mpumalanga province of South Africa.
