= Sheepmoor =

- Location within Mpumalanga Location within South Africa
- Coordinates: 26°43′7″S 30°17′56″E
- Country: South Africa
- Province: Mpumalanga
- District: Gert Sibande
- Municipality: Msukaligwa

Area
  - Total: 1.93 km^{2} (0.75 sq mi)

Population (2011)
  - Total: 2,727
  - Density: 1,410/km^{2} (3,660/sq mi)

Racial makeup (2011)
  - Black African: 98.2%
  - Coloured: 0.1%
  - Indian/Asian: 0.6%
  - White: 1.0%
  - Other: 0.2%

First languages (2011)
  - Zulu: 91.4%
  - Swazi: 2.8%
  - Afrikaans: 1.4%
  - English: 1.4%
  - Other: 3.0%
- Time zone: UTC+2 (SAST)
- Postal code (street): 2352
- PO box: 2352
- Area code: 017

Sheepmoor is a town in Gert Sibande District Municipality in the Mpumalanga province of South Africa.

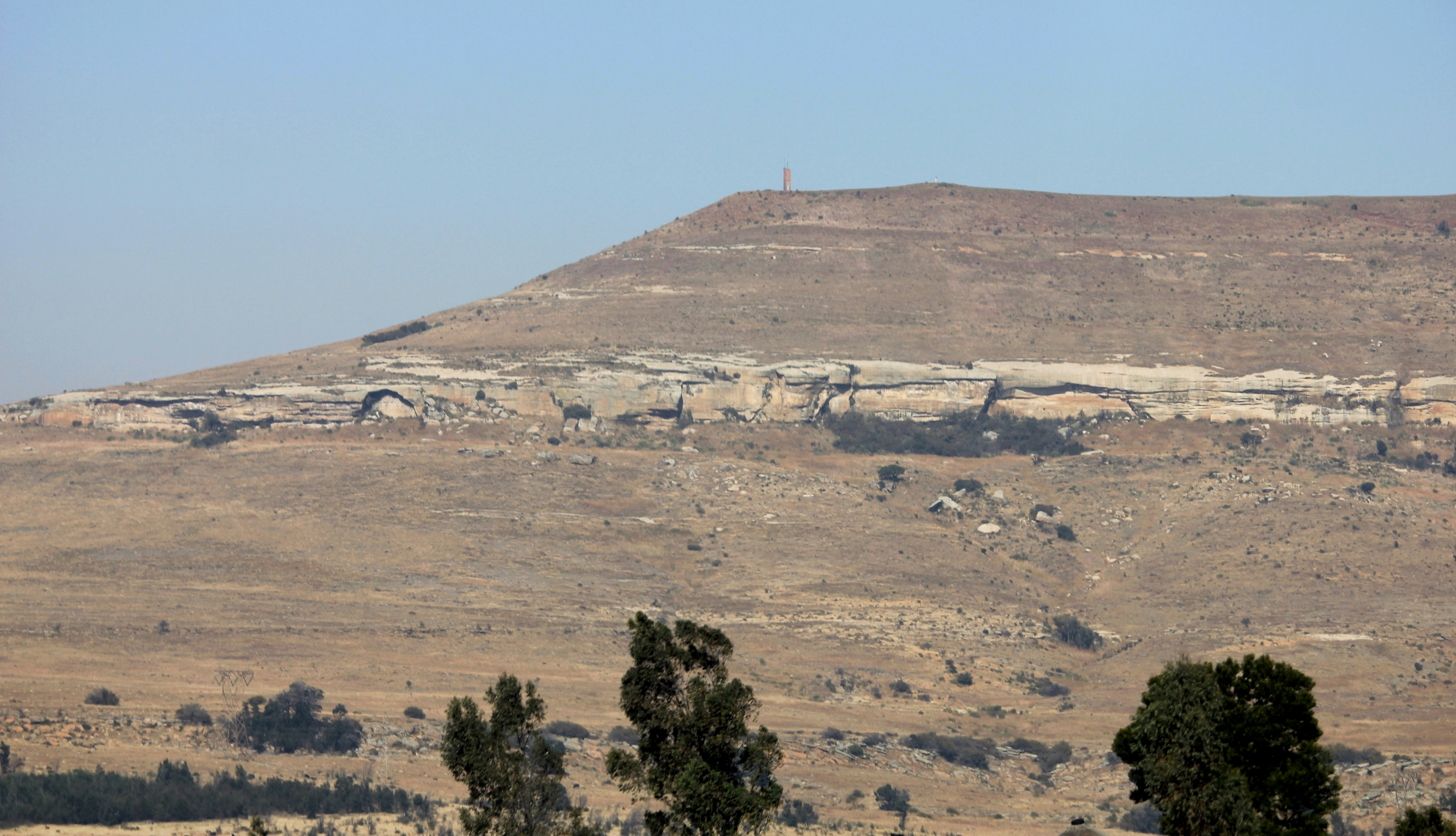
Spitskop (1,827 m) is the highest point of a sandstone escarpment south of Sheepmoor

The town as it is known today used to be a farm.

The farm belonged to Mr. Stenekamp who bought it from a farmer who originally bought it from the Swazi King. Mr. Stenekamp divided the farm up into small stands with a clause included in every title deed that no sales of alcohol would be allowed to be sold on this side of the train tracks where the people lived and built houses.

Poor Afrikaans people could buy stands and build houses.

The language was Afrikaans.

There was no infrastructure for any development.

Three churches, and a boarding school were built by the community as well as a Boeresaal for meetings and functions by farmers in the area.

A post office, telephone operator, a shop with a petrol station, a train station and an Indian shop – Sarang se winkel – was also built.

After 1994, Msukaligwa Municipality built Bee Maseko secondary school, a cemetery and a clinic as well as distributed stands to black people and built a community hall for the youth.

The small village of Sheepmoor is known for the case of Sandra Laing, who in 1966 was reclassified from white to coloured by the government.
