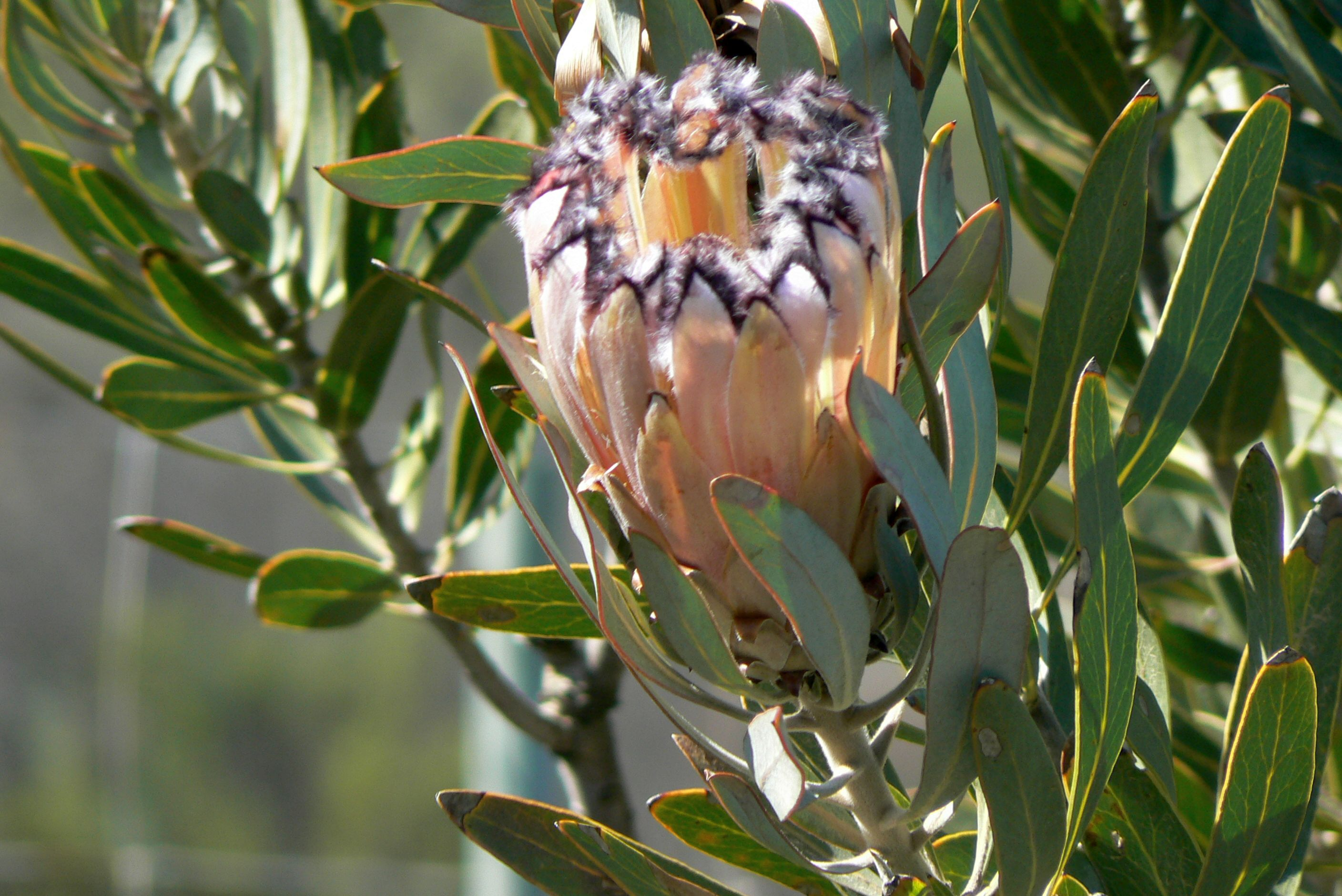
- Cederberg, South Africa

Conservation status
- Least Concern (IUCN 3.1)

Scientific classification
- Kingdom: Plantae
- Clade: Embryophytes
- Clade: Tracheophytes
- Clade: Angiosperms
- Clade: Eudicots
- Order: Proteales
- Family: Proteaceae
- Genus: Protea
- Species: P. laurifolia

Binomial name
- Protea laurifolia Thunb.

Synonyms
- Protea comigera Stapf; Protea marginata Thunb.; Protea lepidocarpon Sims; Protea melaleuca R.Br.; Scolymocephalus marginatus Kuntze; Scolymocephalus melaleucus (R.Br.) Kuntze

= Protea laurifolia =

Species of flowering plant

Protea laurifolia, also known as the grey-leaf sugarbush, is a shrub from South Africa. It is native to the Cape Provinces of South Africa.

Another vernacular name for this species is laurel sugarbush. In Afrikaans this species is known by the common names of louriersuikerbos, lourier-suikerbos, suikerbos and suikerkan.

Protea laurifolia was first described by Carl Peter Thunberg in 1806.

== Description ==
Protea laurifolia is a tall, erect shrub which can grow up to eight metres in height. The leaves are grey to bluish green and short-stalked with horny margins. It flowers from mid-Autumn to early Winter, or from April to November. The plant is monoecious with both sexes in each flower.

It is similar to P. neriifolia, but has a more westerly distribution. P. neriifolia has sessile (no petiole) leaves, which curve upwards and are often somewhat more greenish.

== Distribution ==
This plant species is endemic to South Africa, but occurs in both the Northern and Western Cape provinces. It is found from Nieuwoudtville to Franschhoek and Anysberg. In the Western Cape it occurs in the Elands Kloof in the Hottentots Holland Mountains and the Agterwitzenberg Vlakte in the Skurweberg Mountains, part of the Koue Bokkeveld mountain range.

== Ecology ==
It grows in sandy or granite soils, at altitudes of 400 to 1,200 metres (1,300 to 3,900 ft). It is usually found in a fynbos habitat, but sometimes also grows on shale, or in renosterveld or scrubland.

The adult plants are killed by the periodic wildfires of its habitat, but its seeds survive these events. The fruits are woody and persistent, which means they are retained on the plant after senescence. The burnt skeletons of trees release the seeds from the retained dry flower heads in the season following a wildfire. The seeds are dispersed by means of the wind.

== Horticulture ==
The hybrid cultivar 'Rose Mink' was selected by Dennis Perry and is sold in the US as an ornamental plant. It is fairly frost-hardy in southern Californian gardens.

== Conservation ==
The status of world population is not considered threatened. It was first assessed as 'least concern' by the South African National Biodiversity Institute (SANBI) in 2009. According to the 2019 SANBI assessment the overall population is decreasing, but it was nonetheless still assessed as 'least concern'.
