= Pixley ka Seme Local Municipality elections =

The Pixley ka Seme Local Municipality is a Local Municipality in Mpumalanga in South Africa. The council consists of twenty-one members elected by mixed-member proportional representation. Eleven councillors are elected by first-past-the-post voting in eleven wards, while the remaining ten are chosen from party lists so that the total number of party representatives is proportional to the number of votes received. In the election of 1 November 2021 the African National Congress (ANC) won a majority of thirteen seats.

== Results ==
The following table shows the composition of the council after past elections.

Event	ANC	DA	EFF	FF+	IFP	Other	Total
2000 election	15	4	—	—	1	—	20
2006 election	16	3	—	1	1	0	21
2011 election	16	3	—	0	1	1	21
2016 election	17	2	1	0	1	0	21
2021 election	13	2	3	0	1	2	21

== December 2000 election ==
The following table shows the results of the 2000 election.

Party	Ward			List			Total seats
Party	Votes	%	Seats	Votes	%	Seats	Total seats
African National Congress	11,249	73.19	9	11,187	73.11	6	15
Democratic Alliance	3,290	21.41	1	3,204	20.94	3	4
Inkatha Freedom Party	830	5.40	0	911	5.95	1	1
Total	15,369	100.00	10	15,302	100.00	10	20
Valid votes	15,369	96.47		15,302	96.27		
Invalid/blank votes	563	3.53		593	3.73		
Total votes	15,932	100.00		15,895	100.00		
Registered voters/turnout	32,525	48.98		32,525	48.87		

== March 2006 election ==
The following table shows the results of the 2006 election.

Party	Ward			List			Total seats
Party	Votes	%	Seats	Votes	%	Seats	Total seats
African National Congress	13,147	75.63	11	13,391	77.65	5	16
Democratic Alliance	2,015	11.59	0	1,959	11.36	3	3
Inkatha Freedom Party	1,055	6.07	0	1,234	7.16	1	1
Freedom Front Plus	424	2.44	0	452	2.62	1	1
Independent candidates	532	3.06	0				0
Pan Africanist Congress of Azania	211	1.21	0	209	1.21	0	0
Total	17,384	100.00	11	17,245	100.00	10	21
Valid votes	17,384	97.38		17,245	96.60		
Invalid/blank votes	468	2.62		607	3.40		
Total votes	17,852	100.00		17,852	100.00		
Registered voters/turnout	33,947	52.59		33,947	52.59		

== May 2011 election ==
The following table shows the results of the 2011 election.

Party	Ward			List			Total seats
Party	Votes	%	Seats	Votes	%	Seats	Total seats
African National Congress	15,094	73.83	10	15,305	75.28	6	16
Democratic Alliance	2,860	13.99	1	2,873	14.13	2	3
Independent Ratepayers Association of SA	1,315	6.43	0	1,110	5.46	1	1
Inkatha Freedom Party	721	3.53	0	520	2.56	1	1
Freedom Front Plus	384	1.88	0	172	0.85	0	0
National Freedom Party	54	0.26	0	258	1.27	0	0
Pan Africanist Congress of Azania	17	0.08	0	93	0.46	0	0
Total	20,445	100.00	11	20,331	100.00	10	21
Valid votes	20,445	97.17		20,331	96.72		
Invalid/blank votes	595	2.83		689	3.28		
Total votes	21,040	100.00		21,020	100.00		
Registered voters/turnout	34,578	60.85		34,578	60.79		

== August 2016 election ==
The following table shows the results of the 2016 election.

Party	Ward			List			Total seats
Party	Votes	%	Seats	Votes	%	Seats	Total seats
African National Congress	17,283	77.37	11	17,481	78.30	6	17
Democratic Alliance	2,344	10.49	0	2,405	10.77	2	2
Economic Freedom Fighters	1,348	6.03	0	1,419	6.36	1	1
Inkatha Freedom Party	412	1.84	0	486	2.18	1	1
Freedom Front Plus	331	1.48	0	389	1.74	0	0
Independent candidates	478	2.14	0				0
African Christian Democratic Party	142	0.64	0	147	0.66	0	0
Total	22,338	100.00	11	22,327	100.00	10	21
Valid votes	22,338	97.86		22,327	97.82		
Invalid/blank votes	488	2.14		497	2.18		
Total votes	22,826	100.00		22,824	100.00		
Registered voters/turnout	38,501	59.29		38,501	59.28		

== November 2021 election ==
The following table shows the results of the 2021 election.

Party	Ward			List			Total seats
Party	Votes	%	Seats	Votes	%	Seats	Total seats
African National Congress	9,953	60.51	11	10,135	60.89	2	13
Economic Freedom Fighters	2,343	14.24	0	2,529	15.19	3	3
Democratic Alliance	1,472	8.95	0	1,461	8.78	2	2
Forum for Service Delivery	610	3.71	0	567	3.41	1	1
Inkatha Freedom Party	522	3.17	0	599	3.60	1	1
African People's Movement	478	2.91	0	435	2.61	1	1
Freedom Front Plus	367	2.23	0	407	2.45	0	0
National Freedom Party	196	1.19	0	196	1.18	0	0
African Transformation Movement	128	0.78	0	130	0.78	0	0
African Christian Democratic Party	113	0.69	0	130	0.78	0	0
Independent candidates	242	1.47	0				0
United Independent Movement	24	0.15	0	56	0.34	0	0
Total	16,448	100.00	11	16,645	100.00	10	21
Valid votes	16,448	97.79		16,645	97.44		
Invalid/blank votes	372	2.21		437	2.56		
Total votes	16,820	100.00		17,082	100.00		
Registered voters/turnout	37,767	44.54		37,767	45.23		

=== By-elections from November 2021 ===
The following by-elections were held to fill vacant ward seats in the period since November 2021.

Date	Ward	Party of the previous councillor	Party of the newly elected councillor
16 Mar 2022	1	African National Congress	African National Congress
