= Yende =

Yende is a surname. Notable people with the surname include:

- Mthokozisi Yende (born 1984), South African footballer
- Pretty Yende (born 1985), South African opera singer
- Sizwe Sama Yende (born 1977), South African journalist and author

== See also ==
- Yendi
