= Dirkiesdorp =

Dirkiesdorp Simakade
- Location within Mpumalanga Location within South Africa
- Coordinates: 27.173°S 30.402°E
- Country: South Africa
- Province: Mpumalanga
- District: Gert Sibande
- Municipality: Mkhondo
- Established: 1830

Area
  - Total: 2.85 km^{2} (1.10 sq mi)

Population (2011)
  - Total: 2,432
  - Density: 853/km^{2} (2,210/sq mi)

Racial makeup (2011)
  - Black African: 99.1%
  - Coloured: 0.3%
  - Indian/Asian: 0.5%
  - White: 0.1%

First languages (2011)
  - Zulu: 92.8%
  - S. Ndebele: 2.2%
  - English: 1.6%
  - Other: 3.4%
- Time zone: UTC+2 (SAST)
- PO box: 2386

Dirkiesdorp is a village in the Gert Sibande District Municipality in the Mpumalanga province of South Africa.

== Education ==
There are only two recognised schools in Dirkiesdorp.
