= Dipaleseng Local Municipality elections =

The Dipaleseng Local Municipality is a Local Municipality in Mpumalanga, South Africa. The council consists of twelve members elected by mixed-member proportional representation. Six councillors are elected by first-past-the-post voting in six wards, while the remaining six are chosen from party lists so that the total number of party representatives is proportional to the number of votes received. In the election of 1 November 2021 the African National Congress (ANC) won a majority of eight seats.

== Results ==
The following table shows the composition of the council after past elections.

Event	ANC	DA	EFF	Other	Total
2000 election	8	3	—	0	11
2006 election	8	2	—	1	11
2011 election	7	2	—	3	12
2016 election	9	2	1	0	12
2021 election	8	1	2	1	12

== December 2000 election ==
The following table shows the results of the 2000 election.

Party	Ward			List			Total seats
Party	Votes	%	Seats	Votes	%	Seats	Total seats
African National Congress	5,994	69.49	5	6,022	69.82	3	8
Democratic Alliance	1,893	21.95	1	1,982	22.98	2	3
Pan Africanist Congress of Azania	368	4.27	0	365	4.23	0	0
Inkatha Freedom Party	190	2.20	0	178	2.06	0	0
United Democratic Movement	115	1.33	0	78	0.90	0	0
Independent candidates	66	0.77	0				0
Total	8,626	100.00	6	8,625	100.00	5	11
Valid votes	8,626	97.24		8,625	97.02		
Invalid/blank votes	245	2.76		265	2.98		
Total votes	8,871	100.00		8,890	100.00		
Registered voters/turnout	17,547	50.56		17,547	50.66		

== March 2006 election ==
The following table shows the results of the 2006 election.

Party	Ward			List			Total seats
Party	Votes	%	Seats	Votes	%	Seats	Total seats
African National Congress	7,282	75.28	5	7,350	76.02	3	8
Democratic Alliance	1,497	15.48	1	1,481	15.32	1	2
Pan Africanist Congress of Azania	537	5.55	0	527	5.45	1	1
Freedom Front Plus	154	1.59	0	212	2.19	0	0
Economic Freedom Movement	88	0.91	0	98	1.01	0	0
Independent candidates	115	1.19	0				0
Total	9,673	100.00	6	9,668	100.00	5	11
Valid votes	9,673	96.89		9,668	96.70		
Invalid/blank votes	310	3.11		330	3.30		
Total votes	9,983	100.00		9,998	100.00		
Registered voters/turnout	18,892	52.84		18,892	52.92		

== May 2011 election ==
The following table shows the results of the 2011 election.

Party	Ward			List			Total seats
Party	Votes	%	Seats	Votes	%	Seats	Total seats
African National Congress	5,433	47.04	4	6,816	61.52	3	7
Independent candidates	3,378	29.25	1				1
Democratic Alliance	1,483	12.84	1	1,574	14.21	1	2
Socialist Civic Movement	772	6.68	0	2,125	19.18	2	2
Pan Africanist Congress of Azania	310	2.68	0	364	3.29	0	0
Congress of the People	173	1.50	0	200	1.81	0	0
Total	11,549	100.00	6	11,079	100.00	6	12
Valid votes	11,549	95.81		11,079	93.19		
Invalid/blank votes	505	4.19		809	6.81		
Total votes	12,054	100.00		11,888	100.00		
Registered voters/turnout	19,547	61.67		19,547	60.82		

== August 2016 election ==
The following table shows the results of the 2016 election.

Party	Ward			List			Total seats
Party	Votes	%	Seats	Votes	%	Seats	Total seats
African National Congress	9,541	75.86	6	9,560	76.46	3	9
Democratic Alliance	1,635	13.00	0	1,628	13.02	2	2
Economic Freedom Fighters	485	3.86	0	503	4.02	1	1
Socialist Civic Movement	446	3.55	0	475	3.80	0	0
Freedom Front Plus	167	1.33	0	189	1.51	0	0
Pan Africanist Congress of Azania	148	1.18	0	149	1.19	0	0
Independent candidates	155	1.23	0				0
Total	12,577	100.00	6	12,504	100.00	6	12
Valid votes	12,577	97.88		12,504	97.60		
Invalid/blank votes	272	2.12		307	2.40		
Total votes	12,849	100.00		12,811	100.00		
Registered voters/turnout	21,413	60.01		21,413	59.83		

== November 2021 election ==
The following table shows the results of the 2021 election.

Party	Ward			List			Total seats
Party	Votes	%	Seats	Votes	%	Seats	Total seats
African National Congress	5,275	56.17	6	5,542	59.40	2	8
Economic Freedom Fighters	1,304	13.89	0	1,738	18.63	2	2
Freedom Front Plus	664	7.07	0	671	7.19	1	1
Democratic Alliance	601	6.40	0	673	7.21	1	1
Independent candidates	1,105	11.77	0				0
African Transformation Movement	174	1.85	0	205	2.20	0	0
African Christian Democratic Party	134	1.43	0	185	1.98	0	0
Socialist Civic Movement	49	0.52	0	129	1.38	0	0
Pan Africanist Congress of Azania	56	0.60	0	108	1.16	0	0
Inkatha Freedom Party	29	0.31	0	79	0.85	0	0
Total	9,391	100.00	6	9,330	100.00	6	12
Valid votes	9,391	97.55		9,330	97.28		
Invalid/blank votes	236	2.45		261	2.72		
Total votes	9,627	100.00		9,591	100.00		
Registered voters/turnout	20,948	45.96		20,948	45.78		

=== By-elections from November 2021 ===
The following by-elections were held to fill vacant ward seats in the period since the election in November 2021.

Date	Ward	Party of the previous councillor	Party of the newly elected councillor
5 April 2023	5	African National Congress	African National Congress
