= KwaNgema =

- Location within Mpumalanga Location within South Africa
- Coordinates: 27.010°S 30.489°E
- Country: South Africa
- Province: Mpumalanga
- District: Gert Sibande
- Municipality: Mkhondo

Area
  - Total: 21.01 km^{2} (8.11 sq mi)

Population (2011)
  - Total: 1,006
  - Density: 47.88/km^{2} (124.0/sq mi)

Racial makeup (2011)
  - Black African: 99.7%
  - White: 0.3%

First languages (2011)
  - Zulu: 95.5%
  - S. Ndebele: 2.4%
  - Other: 2.1%
- Time zone: UTC+2 (SAST)

KwaNgema is a town in Gert Sibande District Municipality in the Mpumalanga province of South Africa.
