= Hartebeeskop =

- Etjelembube
- Location within Mpumalanga Location within South Africa
- Coordinates: 26.181°S 30.920°E
- Country: South Africa
- Province: Mpumalanga
- District: Gert Sibande
- Municipality: Albert Luthuli

Area
  - Total: 21.84 km^{2} (8.43 sq mi)

Population (2001)
  - Total: 2,289
  - Density: 104.8/km^{2} (271.5/sq mi)

Racial makeup (2001)
  - Black African: 100.0%

First languages (2001)
  - Swazi: 61.2%
  - Zulu: 36.8%
  - Xhosa: 0.9%
  - Other: 1.1%
- Time zone: UTC+2 (SAST)

Hartebeeskop, officially Etjelembube is a town in Gert Sibande District Municipality in the Mpumalanga province of South Africa. It is situated close to the western border of eSwatini.
