= Pixley ka Seme Municipality =

Pixley ka Seme Municipality may refer to:

- Pixley ka Seme District Municipality in Northern Cape province, South Africa
- Pixley ka Seme Local Municipality in Mpumalanga province, South Africa
