= Amersfoort (disambiguation) =

Amersfoort may refer to:

- Amersfoort, a city in the Netherlands
- Amersfoort, Mpumalanga, a town in South Africa
- The Amersfoort concentration camp
- New Amersfoort, a town in New Netherland
