= Diepgezet =

- Location within Mpumalanga Location within South Africa
- Coordinates: 26.014°S 31.075°E
- Country: South Africa
- Province: Mpumalanga
- District: Gert Sibande
- Municipality: Albert Luthuli

Area
  - Total: 4.89 km^{2} (1.89 sq mi)

Population (2001)
  - Total: 229
  - Density: 46.8/km^{2} (121/sq mi)

Racial makeup (2001)
  - Black African: 85.6%
  - Coloured: 1.3%
  - White: 13.1%

First languages (2001)
  - Swazi: 73.8%
  - Afrikaans: 6.6%
  - English: 6.6%
  - Xhosa: 6.6%
  - Other: 6.6%
- Time zone: UTC+2 (SAST)

Msauli (eMntsoli) is a deserted town in Gert Sibande District Municipality in the Mpumalanga province of South Africa.

Formerly an asbestos mining town owned by Msauli and African Chrysotile Asbestos Limited (ACA) before abandonment in 2002 due to the imminent closure of the mine as a result of a proposed ban on the usage of asbestos eventually signed into law in 2008.
