= Eerie Assignment =

South African memoir (2017)

Eerie Assignment: A journalist's nightmare in Mpumalanga
- First edition
- Author: Sizwe Sama Yende
- Language: English
- Subject: Political journalism
- Genre: Memoir
- Publisher: Lesedi House Publishers
- Publication date: May 2017
- Publication place: South Africa
- Media type: Print
- Pages: 371
- ISBN: 978-0-620-72980-2

Eerie Assignment is a memoir written by South African journalist Sizwe Sama Yende. It was released by Lesedi House Publishers in May 2017.

The book talks about Sama Yende's experience being an investigative journalist in Mpumalanga during deputy president David Mabuza's rule as Premier of Mpumalanga and ANC provincial chairperson.

Sama Yende describes the atmosphere of fear in a province infamous of politically motivated assassinations, corruption, greed and the efforts by politicians to silence journalists, either through bribes or threats.

The book covers mostly of Sama Yende's work of a career spanning from 1998 and later reporter for the City Press newspaper, during Mabuza's "topsy-turvy" rule that spans at least from 2008 to 2018
