= Daggakraal =

- Location within Mpumalanga Location within South Africa
- Coordinates: 27.117°S 29.967°E
- Country: South Africa
- Province: Mpumalanga
- District: Gert Sibande
- Municipality: Pixley Ka Seme

Area
  - Total: 64.43 km^{2} (24.88 sq mi)

Population (2011)
  - Total: 17,378
  - Density: 269.7/km^{2} (698.6/sq mi)

Racial makeup (2011)
  - Black African: 99.3%
  - Coloured: 0.1%
  - Indian/Asian: 0.3%
  - White: 0.1%
  - Other: 0.1%

First languages (2011)
  - Zulu: 90.7%
  - Swazi: 4.0%
  - Sotho: 2.5%
  - Other: 2.8%
- Time zone: UTC+2 (SAST)

Daggakraal is a rural area in Gert Sibande District Municipality near Volksrust in the outskirts of Mpumalanga province, South Africa. The area had about 1,450 households in 2014. The town is referred to as "one of South Africa's most impoverished and isolated communities with plenty of unmined mineral resources."

Daggakraal area code 2492 has two clinics namely Sinqobile CHC in Daggakraal no 3 and Daggakraal CHC in Sinqobile A. There are four primary schools namely Sizenzele Primary School, Hambani Primary School, Daggakraal Primary School and Ethembeni Primary School and two high schools are Nalithuba Secondary School and Seme Secondary School named after ANC founder Dr. Pixley Ka Isaka Seme.

== Founding ==
Pixley Ka Isaka Seme, President of the African National Congress from 1930 to 1936, was born in Durban in 1881. In 1911, he established the "South African Native Farmers Association" in order to encourage black farm labourers from the Free State to buy land in the area and become commercial farmers themselves, and thus to attain personal independence. This initiative led to the settling of Daggakraal in 1912, and so worried the white government that it formulated and enacted the Natives Land Act of 1913, barring black people from owning land in South Africa. However, the black farmers who had bought property in Daggakraal retained the land they had purchased. These farmers later rented residential stands to families that relocated from the Eastern Transvaal. Seme owned two farms in the area.

== Post-apartheid ==
In 1997, a piggery, grain and livestock farm was handed to the community as part of South Africa's land reform programme. As a result of infighting amongst the beneficiaries and misappropriation of funds, the bequests are now unproductive. A soccer stadium which began construction in 1991 was never completed due to embezzlement.

A statue of Dr. Pixley Ka. Isaka Seme was erected and unveiled in the Daggakraal Number 02 front opposite Daggakraal Police Station and Ethembeni Primary School on 31 March 2012.
