= Dundonald, Mpumalanga =

Dundonald Dondoni
- Location within Mpumalanga Location within South Africa
- Coordinates: 26.238°S 30.832°E
- Country: South Africa
- Province: Mpumalanga
- District: Gert Sibande
- Municipality: Albert Luthuli

Area
  - Total: 5.51 km^{2} (2.13 sq mi)

Population (2011)
  - Total: 4,764
  - Density: 865/km^{2} (2,240/sq mi)

Racial makeup (2011)
  - Black African: 99.3%
  - Coloured: 0.1%
  - Indian/Asian: 0.3%
  - White: 0.2%
  - Other: 0.1%

First languages (2011)
  - Swati: 57.5%
  - Zulu: 38.9%
  - Other: 3.6%
- Time zone: UTC+2 (SAST)
- Postal code (street): 2335
- PO box: 2336
- Area code: 017

Dundonald is a village in Gert Sibande District Municipality in the Mpumalanga province of South Africa. It was formerly part of the KaNgwane homeland.
