= Davel =

- Location within Mpumalanga Location within South Africa
- Coordinates: 26°26′55″S 29°39′57″E
- Country: South Africa
- Province: Mpumalanga
- District: Gert Sibande
- Municipality: Msukaligwa

Area
  - Total: 2.40 km^{2} (0.93 sq mi)
- Elevation: 1,700 m (5,600 ft)

Population (2011)
  - Total: 1,193
  - Density: 497/km^{2} (1,290/sq mi)

Racial makeup (2011)
  - Black African: 96.1%
  - Coloured: 1.9%
  - White: 1.8%
  - Other: 0.2%

First languages (2011)
  - Zulu: 84.7%
  - Afrikaans: 3.0%
  - English: 2.5%
  - Swazi: 2.1%
  - Other: 7.7%
- Time zone: UTC+2 (SAST)
- PO box: 2320
- Area code: 017

Davel is a settlement in the Mpumalanga province of South Africa. It is situated next to the N17 highway in the south-west of the province between the larger towns of Bethal and Ermelo.

It is also the site of a Sentech VHF transmitter.
