= Ngema =

Ngema is a surname found in South Africa. Notable people with this surname include:

- Khosi Ngema, South African actress
- Mangaliso Ngema, South African actor
- Mbongeni Ngema (1955–2023), South African playwright and musician
- Nkosinathi Ngema (born 1979), South African football player
- Shadrack Ngema (1950–2015), South African actor and sports commentator
- Sthembiso Ngema, South African politician
- Sipho Ngema (1972–2020), South African actor
- Vincent Ngema (born 1950), South African politician
- Velaphi Ngema (born 1961- 2008) South African graphic designer

== See also ==
- Ngema Farm, in Kenya
- Ngemah (state constituency), in Malaysia
