= Lochiel, Mpumalanga =

Lochiel Lohiya
- Location within Mpumalanga Location within South Africa
- Coordinates: 26.136°S 30.786°E
- Country: South Africa
- Province: Mpumalanga
- District: Gert Sibande
- Municipality: Albert Luthuli

Area
  - Total: 8.01 km^{2} (3.09 sq mi)

Population (2001)
  - Total: 2,805
  - Density: 350/km^{2} (907/sq mi)

Racial makeup (2001)
  - Black African: 99.6%
  - Coloured: 0.4%

First languages (2001)
  - Swazi: 83.5%
  - Zulu: 14.6%
  - Afrikaans: 0.8%
  - Sotho: 0.5%
  - Other: 0.6%
- Time zone: UTC+2 (SAST)
- Postal code (street): 2337
- PO box: 2337

Lochiel is a small forestry town in Gert Sibande District Municipality in the Mpumalanga province of South Africa. It lies near the border with Eswatini.
