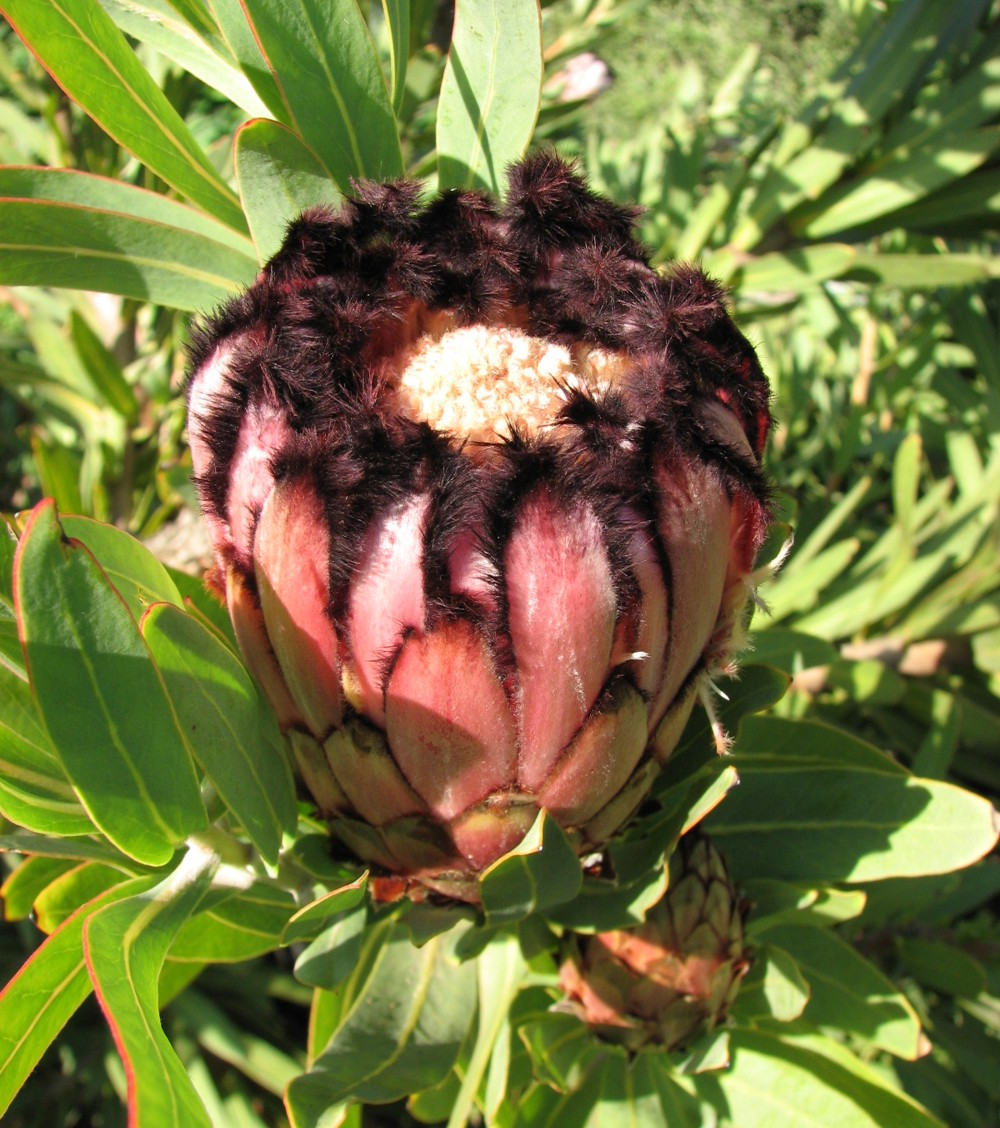
- Protea neriifolia at the Royal Botanic Gardens, Melbourne in Australia

Conservation status
- Least Concern (IUCN 3.1)

Scientific classification
- Kingdom: Plantae
- Clade: Embryophytes
- Clade: Tracheophytes
- Clade: Angiosperms
- Clade: Eudicots
- Order: Proteales
- Family: Proteaceae
- Genus: Protea
- Species: P. neriifolia

Binomial name
- Protea neriifolia R.Br.

Synonyms
- Scolymocephalus neriifolius (R.Br.) Kuntze

= Protea neriifolia =

Species of flowering plant

Protea neriifolia, also known as the narrow-leaf sugarbush, oleander-leaved sugarbush, blue sugarbush, or the oleanderleaf protea, is a flowering plant in the genus Protea, which is endemic to South Africa.

Common names for the species in the Afrikaans language include blousuikerbos, baardsuikerbos, baardsuikerkan, blou-suikerbos, blousuikerkan, roosboom and suikerbos.

The tree's national number is 93.1.

== Taxonomy ==
Although it was first discovered by Europeans in 1597, and was the subject of a botanical illustration in 1605, the plant was first described as a distinct species according to the modern Linnaean system by the naturalist Robert Brown in his 1810 treatise On the Proteaceae of Jussieu.

== Description ==
It is a large, erect shrub or small tree, growing from about three to five metres in height. The stems become glabrous (hairless) when mature.

The leaves are 'sessile', which means they lack a petiole and arise straight from the stems. These leaves diagnostically curve upwards. They are elliptic-shaped, coloured green or blue-grey, and their margin run parallel to each other. The leaves become glabrous when mature.

It blooms in Summer and Spring, although it has also been seen blooming in the Winter and Autumn. The plant is monoecious, with both sexes in each flower. It has its flowers arranged in a flower head, a special type of inflorescence. Each branch bears only one inflorescence. This species is recognisable in having the inflorescence shaped as a long, oblong cone. It is 13 by 8 cm in size. The flower heads are cup-shaped, and the flowers within them contain nectar. The inflorescence is subtended (i.e. surrounded or covered) by 'involucral bracts'. These outer bracts range in colour from carmine to pink to creamy-green or whitish, this colour contrasts with the characteristic hairy black fringe on the margins of the apex of the bract. The inner bracts are shaped oblong to spatulate, and are typically curved inwards at the tips. These tips are rounded and also covered in a black, sometimes white, beard of fuzzy hairs.

The fruit is a nut, its surface densely covered in hairs. These small nuts are packed together within the dried inflorescence, which remains on the plant after senescence. When eventually released, the seeds are dispersed by means of the wind.

=== Similar species ===
It is similar to Protea laurifolia, whose flower heads also possess a hairy black fringe on their bracts, a species found further to the west. P. laurifolia can be distinguished by means of its leaves having a very short petiole, these leaves have a heavy horny margin and are usually more bluish or silvery-coloured than those of P. neriifolia.

== Distribution ==
Protea neriifolia occurs in both the Western and the Eastern Cape provinces of South Africa. It occurs in the southern coastal mountain ranges of South Africa, between Cape Town and Port Elizabeth. It grows in the mountain ranges of Hottentots Holland, Langeberg, Groot Winterhoek, Elandsberg, Rooiberg, Kammanassie, Potberg, Riviersonderend, Kogelberg and Jonkershoek, as well as at Garcia's Pass and near the towns of Tulbagh and Ceres.

== Ecology ==
The species is encountered in fynbos amongst restios. It usually is found growing in dense stands on south-facing slopes, sometimes occurring together with Leucadendron xanthoconus. It grows on sandy, and in sandstone-, or occasionally granite, derived soils. It is found at altitudes ranging from sea level to 1,300 metres (4,300 ft). During the wildfires which periodically occur in this type of habitat, mature plants of this species are destroyed, but the seeds are able to survive such events.

The flowers are pollinated by birds, which are attracted by the insects and nectar, as well as various insects including protea beetles and scarab beetles.

Plants at the Kirstenbosch Botanic Gardens have their flowers visited by the Cape sugarbird (Promerops cafer).

== Horticulture ==
Protea neriifolia is highly adaptable to cultivation under garden conditions, and is among the most widely grown of the protea species. It is also extensively grown commercially for cut flowers, not only in its native South Africa, but also in Australia, New Zealand, the United States and other countries with climatically suitable areas. In addition to selected cultivars, such as 'Green Ice', 'Margaret Watling' and 'Silvertips', the species has been crossed to produce several hybrids, such as 'Carnival' (P. compacta x P. neriifolia), or perhaps 'Pink Mink'.

== Conservation ==
This species is not threatened. The population numbers are believed to be stable. The South African National Biodiversity Institute assessed the conservation status of the species as 'least concern' in 2009, and again in 2019.
