= Greylingstad =

- Nthorwane
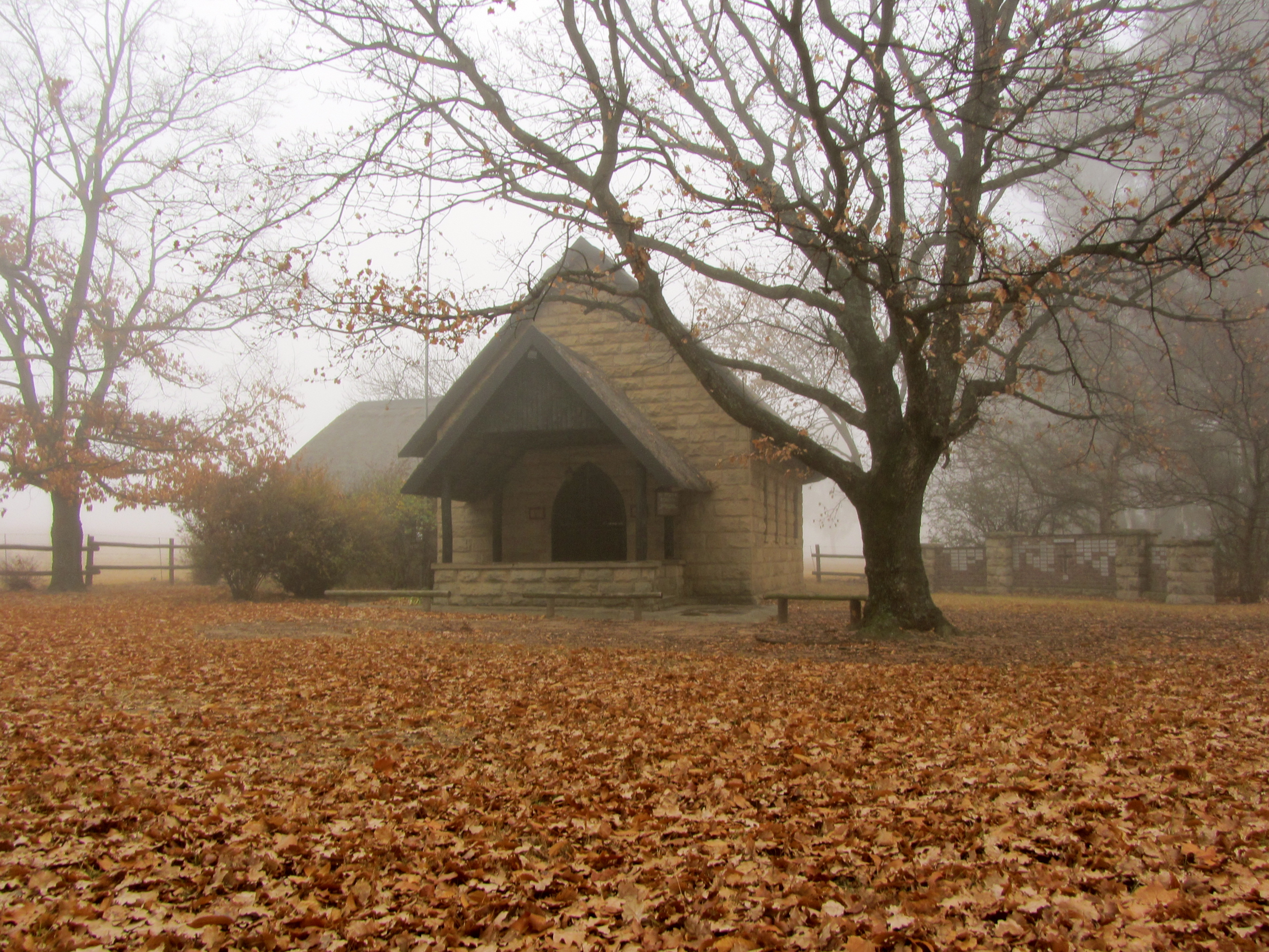
- Chapel of St Francis of Assisi, at the railway stop at Val just outside of Greylingstad.

- Location within Mpumalanga Location within South Africa
- Coordinates: 26°45′S 28°45′E
- Country: South Africa
- Province: Mpumalanga
- District: Gert Sibande
- Municipality: Dipaleseng

Area
  - Total: 9.33 km^{2} (3.60 sq mi)

Population (2011)
  - Total: 839
  - Density: 89.9/km^{2} (233/sq mi)

Racial makeup (2011)
  - Black African: 45.0%
  - Coloured: 0.6%
  - Indian/Asian: 0.8%
  - White: 53.2%
  - Other: 0.4%

First languages (2011)
  - Afrikaans: 51.7%
  - Zulu: 27.9%
  - Sotho: 6.6%
  - English: 4.5%
  - Other: 9.3%
- Time zone: UTC+2 (SAST)
- Postal code (street): 2415
- PO box: 2415
- Area code: 017

Greylingstad (Afrikaans for Greyling City), officially Nthorwane, is a small farming town west of Standerton in Mpumalanga, South Africa.

== History ==
=== Early 20th century ===
The town was founded in 1909 by the Dutch Reformed Church and was named after PJ Greyling, stepson of Piet Retief. A new town was laid out 5 km away in 1913 on the farm Willemsdal owned by Willem Bezuidenhout. In 1914 its name became Greylingstad and everyone moved to the new location.

During the Boer War the Scottish Rifles built a number of small forts overlooking the town and the farms beyond the hills. The Scottish Rifles laid out the initials "SR" on the hill overlooking the town, and it was always clearly visible from the main street of Greylingstad.

=== Late 20th century ===
In the 1950s and 1960s the town had a flourishing farming community.

A major change came about in 1962 when ESCOM (now called ESKOM) erected a 88kV substation and the town, which had about 300 residents at the time, was connected to the main electricity grid.

When the main road between Johannesburg and Durban was upgraded in the 1960s, a bypass was built around Greylingstad which hurt the small businesses in town.

=== Present ===
The farming community is large and growing, and the town is not booming but constantly doing business.
