= Skurweberg Pass =

Skurweberg Pass is situated in the Mpumalanga, on the R541 road between Machadodorp and Badplaas (South Africa).

Skurweberg means ‘rough mountain’ in Afrikaans.
