= Dundonald Castle, Kintyre =

Dundonald Castle
- near Killean, Kintyre, Scotland

Site information
- Condition: Ruin

Location
- Coordinates: 55.6395°N 5.6559°W

Dundonald Castle is a ruined castle near Killean, Kintyre, Scotland. It was a stronghold of Clan Donald, but later passed to the Campbells.
