= Piet Retief, South Africa =

Piet Retief eMkhondo
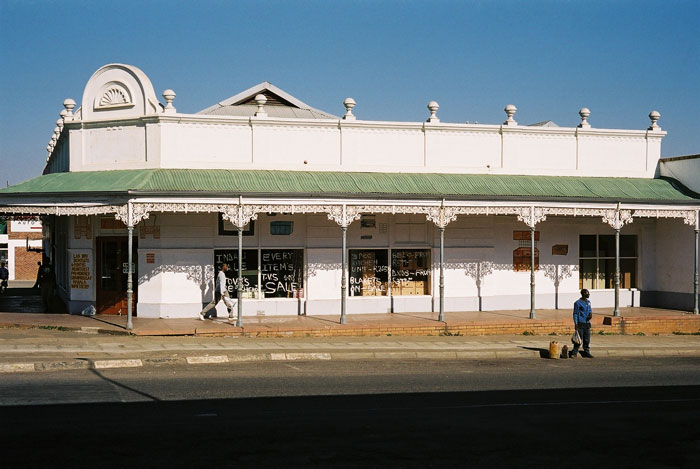
- Typical colonial building in central eMkhondo

- Location within Mpumalanga Location within South Africa Location within Africa
- Coordinates: 27°0′S 30°48′E
- Country: South Africa
- Province: Mpumalanga
- District: Gert Sibande
- Municipality: Mkhondo
- Established: 1882

Area
  - Total: 66.00 km^{2} (25.48 sq mi)
- Elevation: 1,251 m (4,104 ft)

Population (2011)
  - Total: 57,428
  - Density: 870.1/km^{2} (2,254/sq mi)

Racial makeup (2011)
  - Black African: 88.2%
  - Coloured: 1.3%
  - Indian/Asian: 2.1%
  - White: 8.0%
  - Other: 0.4%

First languages (2011)
  - Zulu: 82.8%
  - Afrikaans: 7.8%
  - English: 5.0%
  - Other: 4.4%
- Time zone: UTC+2 (SAST)
- Postal code (street): 2380
- PO box: 2380
- Area code: 017

Piet Retief, officially eMkhondo, is a town situated in a timber-growing region in Mpumalanga province, South Africa. It is the seat of the Mkhondo Local Municipality. It is located just west of the Eswatini border.

== History ==
The town was founded by the Voortrekkers in 1883 and named it after the Voortrekker leader, Piet Retief, who was killed by the Zulus under their King Dingane's orders, after a negotiation for land failed.

In 1886, the inhabitants of the town declared the Klein Vrystaat (Little Free State), which contained a population of only 72. This republic existed until 1891, when it was incorporated into the South African Republic.

The town became a municipality in 1932. Its main tourist attraction is the Dutch Reformed Church that was designed by the architect Gerard Moerdijk and built in 1921.

== Climate and economy ==
The area has an annual rainfall of 1000 mm. Its main economic activities are timber, paper and wattle bark production as well as mica, kaolin and iron mining.

== Name change ==
On 2 February 2010, South African Arts and Culture minister Lulu Xingwana approved a state decision for Piet Retief to be renamed to eMkhondo. Like many other post-apartheid name changes in South Africa, the incident remains controversial. Most residents are uncertain what the new name means. Unlike some place names, such as Verwoerdburg, the name was never considered offensive. Prominent Afrikaner groups, including the Freedom Front Plus, wish to restore the original name.

== People ==
- Jack Diamond, architect, born in Piet Retief
- Heino Kuhn, South Africa national cricket team player
- Sandra Laing, woman who was born to white parents but reclassified as coloured during the apartheid era in South Africa, born in Piet Retief
- Jabulani Mbatha, lifetime Chief, died in Piet Retief in 1945
- Dumisani Msibi, footballer
- Ntokozo "K.O" Mdluli, musician (rapper), Teargas member
- Pretty Yende, opera soprano
- Ntandoyenkosi Kunene, Miss SA 2016
