= Mkhondo Local Municipality =

Coordinates: 26°33′S 29°10′E

Mkhondo
- Local municipality
- Seal

- Location in Mpumalanga
- Country: South Africa
- Province: Mpumalanga
- District: Gert Sibande
- Seat: Piet Retief
- Wards: 19

Government
  - Type: Municipal council
  - Mayor: Ngelosi Ndlovu

Area
  - Total: 4,882 km^{2} (1,885 sq mi)

Population (2011)
  - Total: 171,982
  - Density: 35.23/km^{2} (91.24/sq mi)

Racial makeup (2011)
  - Black African: 94.7%
  - Coloured: 0.5%
  - Indian/Asian: 0.8%
  - White: 3.7%

First languages (2011)
  - Zulu: 89.1%
  - Afrikaans: 3.5%
  - English: 2.4%
  - Swazi: 1.8%
  - Other: 3.2%
- Time zone: UTC+2 (SAST)
- Municipal code: MP303

Mkhondo Municipality (Zulu: UMasipala wase Mkhondo) is a local municipality within the Gert Sibande District Municipality, in the Mpumalanga province of South Africa. Piet Retief is the seat of the municipality.

== Main places ==
The 2001 census divided the municipality into the following main places:

Place	Code	Area (km^{2})	Population	Most spoken language
Amsterdam	80301	4.36	1,452	Swati
Dirkiesdorp	80302	3.30	523	Zulu
Driefontein	80303	53.65	15,319	Zulu
Ethandakukhanya	80304	8.49	24,867	Zulu
KwaNgema	80305	12.13	1,003	Zulu
KwaThandeka	80306	2.91	5,085	Zulu
Ngema	80308	86.10	3,539	Zulu
Piet Retief	80309	55.41	13,052	Zulu
Shabalala	80310	13.71	807	Zulu
Remainder of the municipality	80307	4,628.84	77,246	Zulu

== Politics ==
The municipal council consists of thirty-eight members elected by mixed-member proportional representation. Nineteen councillors are elected by first-past-the-post voting in nineteen wards, while the remaining nineteen are chosen from party lists so that the total number of party representatives is proportional to the number of votes received. In the election of 1 November 2021 the African National Congress (ANC) won a majority of twenty-one seats on the council.

The following table shows the results of the election.

Party	Ward			List			Total seats
Party	Votes	%	Seats	Votes	%	Seats	Total seats
African National Congress	15,043	50.57	16	17,048	57.52	5	21
Economic Freedom Fighters	4,944	16.62	0	5,856	19.76	7	7
Democratic Alliance	2,634	8.85	1	3,115	10.51	3	4
Independent candidates	4,473	15.04	2				2
Inkatha Freedom Party	812	2.73	0	1,114	3.76	1	1
Freedom Front Plus	796	2.68	0	1,027	3.47	1	1
African Transformation Movement	478	1.61	0	670	2.26	1	1
National Freedom Party	228	0.77	0	393	1.33	1	1
2 other parties	341	1.15	0	413	1.39	0	0
Total	29,749	100.00	19	29,636	100.00	19	38
Valid votes	29,749	97.88		29,636	96.23		
Invalid/blank votes	645	2.12		1,160	3.77		
Total votes	30,394	100.00		30,796	100.00		
Registered voters/turnout	70,522	43.10		70,522	43.67		

=== Political assassinations ===
The municipality was described as "the epicentre of political assassinations" after a number of assassinations. In 2022, Sbonelo Mthembu accused former mayor Vusi Motha of having assassinated African National Congress regional secretary Gert Sibande. Mthembu himself was later assassinated. Motha stated that he had intended to sue Mthembu for defamation.
