= Sipho Ngema =

South African actor (1972–2020)

- Born: 21 July 1972; Durban, South Africa
- Died: 21 April 2020 (aged 47); Johannesburg, South Africa
- Occupation: Actor
- Years active: 2000–2020
- Children: 6

Sipho Ngema (21 July 1972 – 21 April 2020) was a South African actor. He is best known for the roles in the television serials such as; Rhythm City and Uzalo.

== Early and personal life ==
Ngema was born on 21 July 1972, and grew up in Durban, KwaZulu Natal, South Africa.

He was married and was a father of six children including, Mbali.

He died on 21 April 2020, in Johannesburg, aged 47, while receiving treatment in Johannesburg. The death cause was heart failure due to pulmonary hypertension.

== Career ==
In 2010, he made a recurring role as "Raymond" in the e.tv soap opera Rhythm City. His role became very popular where he continued to play the role for many years. In 2011, he acted in the e.tv anthology series eKasi: Our Stories and kykNET drama Hartland, both with supportive roles. In 2013, he appeared in the Mzansi Magic miniseries Stash and played the supporting role of "Luthando". In the same year, he played the role "Mike" in the police procedural miniseries Shabangu P.I. and then in comedy miniseries Uyaphapha, both were telecast on Mzansi Magic.

In 2014, he made a minor role in the SABC 1 Docu-Drama Amagugu. In 2017, he joined with the season three of the SABC1 popular soap opera Uzalo. In the soapie, he played a recurring role as "Terror". After that success, he joined with fifth season of SABC 2 comedy serial Skwizas to play the role "Pitso". Later in 2018, he made a guest role in the SABC1 series Diamond City. In 2019, he joined with fourth season of Mzansi Magic telenovela The Queen and played the role "Sjekula". His final television appearance came through Netflix South Africa supernatural series Kings of Jo'burg, where he played the role "Jomo, Menzi's Goon".

== Filmography ==
Year	Film	Role	Genre	Ref.
2010	Rhythm City	Raymond	TV series	
2011	eKasi: Our Stories	Sgoloza / Sipho	TV series	
2011	Hartland	Gemartelde Gevangene	TV series	
2012	Zama Zama	Phuna	Film	
2013	Shabangu P.I.	Mike	TV series	
2013	Stash	Luthando	TV series	
2013	Uyaphapha	Mr. Goodest	TV series	
2014	uSkroef noSexy	General	TV series	
2014	Amagugu	Policeman	TV series	
2015	Rise	Foreman	TV movie	
2015	Tempy Pushas	Abel	TV series	
2017	The Bantu Hour	Cast Member	TV series	
2017	Uzalo	Terror	TV series	
2018	Skwizas	Pitso	TV series	
2018	Diamond City	Fat Cat 1	TV series	
2018	Hope	Police Commissioner	TV series	
2018	Judge Thenjiwe Khambule	Case #1	TV mini series	
2019	The Queen	Sjekula	TV series	
2020	Money & Girls	Master G	TV mini series	
2020	Kings of Jo'burg	Menzi's Goon / Jomo	TV series	
