= Amersfoort, Mpumalanga =

Amersfoort
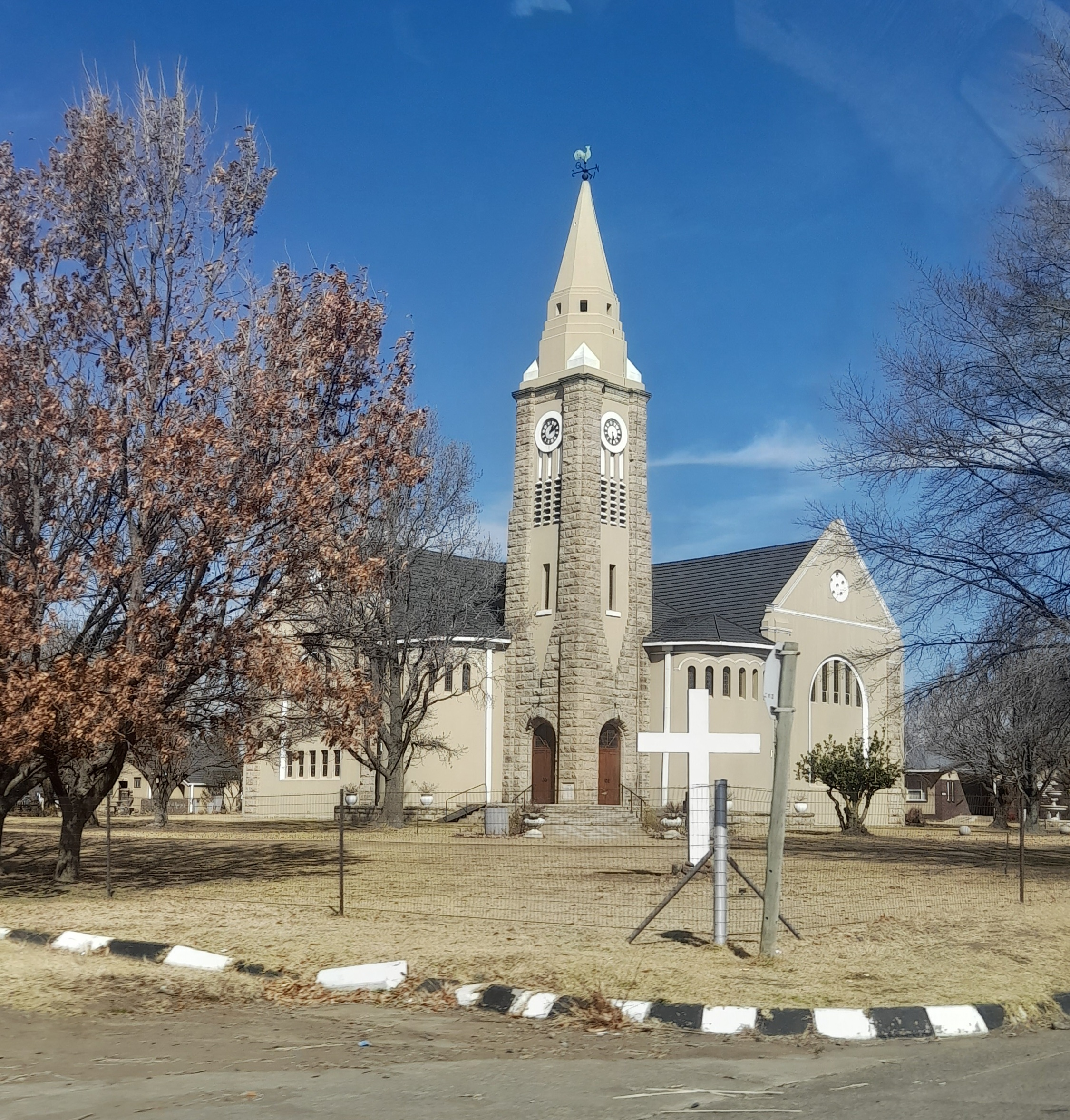
- Dutch Reformed Church

- Location within Mpumalanga Location within South Africa
- Coordinates: 27°00′28″S 29°52′16″E
- Country: South Africa
- Province: Mpumalanga
- District: Gert Sibande
- Municipality: Pixley Ka Seme

Area
  - Total: 17.09 km^{2} (6.60 sq mi)

Population (2011)
  - Total: 12,335
  - Density: 721.8/km^{2} (1,869/sq mi)

Racial makeup (2011)
  - Black African: 93.2%
  - Coloured: 0.2%
  - Indian/Asian: 1.7%
  - White: 4.3%
  - Other: 0.5%

First languages (2011)
  - Zulu: 84.0%
  - Afrikaans: 4.4%
  - Swazi: 3.4%
  - English: 2.1%
  - Other: 6.1%
- Time zone: UTC+2 (SAST)
- Postal code (street): 2490
- PO box: 2490
- Area code: 017

Amersfoort is a small town in Mpumalanga province, South Africa.

== History ==
The town was established in 1888 around a Dutch Reformed Church which was built in 1876. Lying at 1,664 m above sea level in the upper reaches of the Vaal River basin on the banks of the Schulpspruit, the area was first settled by Europeans in 1876 when two farmers of the area donated land to the church, where Rev. Frans Lion Cachet proceeded to build a Dutch Reformed church. The new village was named after the hometown (in the Netherlands) of the Dutch farmers. When the area became too small for the growing village, more land was purchased from one of the original donors and the town was proclaimed in 1888. The bridge over the Vaal River was built in 1896 and is a national monument. The township of eZamokuhle (meaning "to make it beautiful") lies adjacent to the town and contributes greatly to its economy.

== Notable people ==
Pixley ka Isaka Seme, one of the founders of the South African Native National Congress, later renamed the African National Congress, maintained law offices in Amersfoort and spent time there in connection with his legal and political work for the community at Daggakraal, the Native Farmers Association, and the Swazi Royal family in Swaziland.
