= Lekwa Local Municipality =

Coordinates: 26°33′S 29°10′E

Lekwa
- Local municipality
- Seal

- Location in Mpumalanga
- Country: South Africa
- Province: Mpumalanga
- District: Gert Sibande
- Seat: Standerton
- Wards: 15

Government
  - Type: Municipal council

Area
  - Total: 4,585 km^{2} (1,770 sq mi)

Population (2011)
  - Total: 115,662
  - Density: 25.23/km^{2} (65.34/sq mi)

Racial makeup (2011)
  - Black African: 84.2%
  - Coloured: 2.9%
  - Indian/Asian: 1.2%
  - White: 11.4%

First languages (2011)
  - Zulu: 66.2%
  - Afrikaans: 13.2%
  - Sotho: 10.3%
  - English: 3.6%
  - Other: 6.7%
- Time zone: UTC+2 (SAST)
- Municipal code: MP305

Lekwa Municipality (Zulu: UMasipala wase Lekwa; Afrikaans: Lekwa Munisipaliteit; Sotho: Masepala wa Lekwa) is a local municipality situated in the southwest of the Gert Sibande District Municipality, in the Mpumalanga province of South Africa. Standerton, an urban node, is the seat of the municipality. It was inaugurated on 5 December 2000 after the amalgamation of the Standerton, Sakhile and Morgenzon councils. Agriculture, forestry and fishing constitute about 30% of its economy. It is situated on open grassland plains of the Highveld region, which is traversed by the west-flowing Vaal River, for which it is named. Lekwa is the Sesotho name for the Vaal River. Lekwa's first two decades were marked by increasing maladministration, which culminated in a collapse in governance and service delivery by 2020. This had negative consequences for its residents and businesses, the environment, and utilities which were not paid for their services.

== Main places ==
The 2001 census divided the municipality into the following main places:

Place	Code	Area (km^{2})	Population	Most spoken language
Morgenzon	80502	4.99	2,324	Zulu
Sakhile	80503	6.15	39,773	Zulu
Sivukile	80504	0.40	1,743	Zulu
Standerton	80505	36.52	23,291	Afrikaans
Thuthukani	80506	0.95	2,507	Zulu
Tutuka	80507	0.48	315	Zulu
Remainder of the municipality	80501	4,536.73	33,321	Zulu

== Politics ==
The municipal council consists of thirty members elected by mixed-member proportional representation. Fifteen councillors are elected by first-past-the-post voting in fifteen wards, while the remaining fifteen are chosen from party lists so that the total number of party representatives is proportional to the number of votes received. In the election of 1 November 2021 the African National Congress (ANC) lost its majority, winning thirteen seats on the council.

The following table shows the results of the election.

Party	Ward			List			Total seats
Party	Votes	%	Seats	Votes	%	Seats	Total seats
African National Congress	9,739	42.47	12	9,568	41.59	1	13
Lekwa Community Forum	4,251	18.54	0	4,674	20.32	6	6
Democratic Alliance	3,069	13.38	1	3,068	13.34	3	4
Economic Freedom Fighters	2,148	9.37	0	2,069	8.99	3	3
Freedom Front Plus	2,063	9.00	2	2,094	9.10	1	3
African Transformation Movement	432	1.88	0	430	1.87	1	1
Independent candidates	161	0.70	0				0
6 other parties	1,066	4.65	0	1,104	4.80	0	0
Total	22,929	100.00	15	23,007	100.00	15	30
Valid votes	22,929	98.04		23,007	98.04		
Invalid/blank votes	458	1.96		460	1.96		
Total votes	23,387	100.00		23,467	100.00		
Registered voters/turnout	51,116	45.75		51,116	45.91		

Following the election, in which the African National Congress lost its majority for the first time, resulting in one of three hung councils in Mpumalanga, candidates from the Lekwa Community Forum were elected to the mayorship and speaker positions, while the Economic Freedom Fighters won the chief whip position.

== Corruption and mismanagement ==
In 2008 Lekwa's municipal manager, Calvin Ngobeni, was accused of maladministration and was suspended with all members of his short-listing panel. They were charged with misconduct for appointing candidates who did not meet minimum criteria. Two top-ranking officials who were not suitably qualified were also suspended.

In 2017 it became clear that the municipality was one of several drowning in debt due to corruption and lack of skills. Allegations of maladministration and corruption in 2018 cited poor financial discipline, the large deficit, over-indebtedness with SARS and Eskom, besides unauthorised, irregular, fruitless and/or wasteful expenditure which were written off as irrecoverable. A VAT review was recommended, and various instances of non-compliance with the Municipal Finance Management Act (MFMA) were noted. As a result a forensic investigation was launched by the Department of Cooperative Governance (DCoG). In anticipation of the outcome of the Section 106 probe, opposition parties hinted at the precautionary suspension of municipal manager Ms Gugulethu Mhlongo-Ntshangase. Mhlongo-Ntshangase left eMadlangeni Local Municipality (Utrecht) in 2017 amid corruption allegations.

During 2019 the municipality's main water treatment plant in Standerton was in disrepair and was causing pollution of the upper Vaal River. The municipality was unable to explain why large amounts of money spent on the problem had not yet brought a solution. The stench of sewage was also affecting residents of Meyerville in Standerton, besides Sakhile township and Rooikoppen ext 8. R83 million was spent on the Rooikoppen sewage problem without any work being done. To assist users downstream, clean water had to be pumped into the Vaal River to dilute its high salt levels, thereby wasting a large quantity of this scarce resource. Anthony Turton of the Centre for Environmental Management at the University of the Free State, noted that a dysfunctional municipality is usually recognised by the fact that it cannot maintain its sewerage works.

At the same time the town's basic infrastructure appeared visibly aged, with traffic lights being out of order, and potholes present on most streets. It was also unable to provide other basic services in a sustainable manner. It was taken to court by businesses around Standerton for failing to provide clean and sufficient water and electricity. These service interruptions were due to the municipality's soaring debt to Eskom (R1.1 billion by 2020), and its non-payment for services provided by the Department of Water and Sanitation. Notwithstanding it spent large amounts on private security (guards getting R70,000 to R90,000 a month), events (including meat and catering), cars, travelling, accommodation and restaurants during 2018 and 2019.

In 2019 six licensing officials in Standerton were arrested for allegedly falsifying vehicle ownership registration on the national traffic information system (NaTIS) to enable truck owners to avoid payment of vehicle licensing fees, including penalties and arrears.

Over a dozen homes burned down and three children died in a fire in January 2020 while the town had no access to a fire engine. A month after the children's deaths Lekwa ordered two fire engines for R250,000 each, but the contractor which didn't specialise in fire equipment failed to deliver the first, while the second broke down on its way to Standerton. The municipality took receipt of one new fire engine late October 2020. Refuse started piling up on the streets since June 2020, as trucks and equipment were allegedly in disrepair. Potholes in roads caused accidents and deaths, and traffic lights had not been repaired for years. Some areas had been without water for months or years, while others received dirty water. Residents and businesses had to forgo an electricity supply for six hours a day, despite 90% of residents using prepaid meters. Businesses had to spend thousands of rands daily to run electricity generators. Its service billing system had become unreliable in terms of pricing and invoicing, and in August 2020 the municipal workers started a strike which exacerbated matters.
