= Nhlazatshe =

Nhlazatshe eLukwatini
- Location within Mpumalanga Location within South Africa
- Coordinates: 26.094°S 30.768°E
- Country: South Africa
- Province: Mpumalanga
- District: Gert Sibande
- Municipality: Albert Luthuli

Area
  - Total: 14.29 km^{2} (5.52 sq mi)

Population (2001)
  - Total: 387
  - Density: 27.1/km^{2} (70.1/sq mi)

Racial makeup (2001)
  - Black African: 100%

First languages (2001)
  - Swazi: 98.5%
  - Zulu: 1.5%
- Time zone: UTC+2 (SAST)

Nhlazatshe (sometimes spelt Nhlazatje), formerly known as Eerstehoek, is a settlement in Gert Sibande District Municipality in the Mpumalanga province of South Africa.
