= Dipaleseng Local Municipality =

Municipal subdistrict in South Africa

Coordinates: 26°33′S 29°10′E

Dipaleseng
- Local municipality
- Seal

- Location in Mpumalanga
- Country: South Africa
- Province: Mpumalanga
- District: Gert Sibande
- Seat: Balfour
- Wards: 6

Government
  - Type: Municipal council

Area
  - Total: 2,617 km^{2} (1,010 sq mi)

Population (2011)
  - Total: 42,390
  - Density: 16.20/km^{2} (41.95/sq mi)

Racial makeup (2011)
  - Black African: 89.8%
  - Coloured: 0.5%
  - Indian/Asian: 0.9%
  - White: 8.6%

First languages (2011)
  - Zulu: 56.1%
  - Sotho: 24.2%
  - Afrikaans: 9.0%
  - English: 3.0%
  - Other: 7.7%
- Time zone: UTC+2 (SAST)
- Municipal code: MP306

Dipaleseng Municipality (Zulu: UMasipala wase Dipaleseng; Sotho: Masepala wa Dipaleseng) is a local municipality within the Gert Sibande District Municipality, in the Mpumalanga province of South Africa. Balfour is the seat of the municipality.

== Main places ==
The 2001 census divided the municipality into the following main places:

Place	Code	Area (km^{2})	Population	Most spoken language
Balfour	80601	10.02	2,070	Afrikaans
Ekanini	80603	0.34	293	English
Greylingstad	80604	0.14	1,508	Zulu
Nthwane	80605	0.62	2,888	Zulu
Siyathemba	80606	3.91	17,747	Zulu
Remainder of the municipality	80602	2,600.25	14,131	Zulu

== Politics ==
The municipal council consists of twelve members elected by mixed-member proportional representation. Six councillors are elected by first-past-the-post voting in six wards, while the remaining six are chosen from party lists so that the total number of party representatives is proportional to the number of votes received. In the election of 1 November 2021 the African National Congress (ANC) won a majority of eight seats on the council. The following table shows the results of the election.

Party	Ward			List			Total seats
Party	Votes	%	Seats	Votes	%	Seats	Total seats
African National Congress	5,275	56.17	6	5,542	59.40	2	8
Economic Freedom Fighters	1,304	13.89	0	1,738	18.63	2	2
Freedom Front Plus	664	7.07	0	671	7.19	1	1
Democratic Alliance	601	6.40	0	673	7.21	1	1
Independent candidates	1,105	11.77	0				0
5 other parties	442	4.71	0	706	7.57	0	0
Total	9,391	100.00	6	9,330	100.00	6	12
Valid votes	9,391	97.55		9,330	97.28		
Invalid/blank votes	236	2.45		261	2.72		
Total votes	9,627	100.00		9,591	100.00		
Registered voters/turnout	20,948	45.96		20,948	45.78		
