= Msukaligwa Local Municipality =

Coordinates: 26°33′S 29°10′E

Msukaligwa
- Local municipality
- Seal

- Location in Mpumalanga
- Country: South Africa
- Province: Mpumalanga
- District: Gert Sibande
- Seat: Ermelo
- Wards: 19

Government
  - Type: Municipal council

Area
  - Total: 6,016 km^{2} (2,323 sq mi)

Population (2011)
  - Total: 149,377
  - Density: 24.83/km^{2} (64.31/sq mi)

Racial makeup (2011)
  - Black African: 88.1%
  - Coloured: 0.6%
  - Indian/Asian: 1.1%
  - White: 9.8%

First languages (2011)
  - Zulu: 72.6%
  - Afrikaans: 9.8%
  - Swazi: 8.5%
  - English: 3.5%
  - Other: 5.6%
- Time zone: UTC+2 (SAST)
- Municipal code: MP302

Msukaligwa Municipality (Zulu: UMasipala wase Msukaligwa; Afrikaans: Msukaligwa Munisipaliteit) is a local municipality within the Gert Sibande District Municipality, in the Mpumalanga province of South Africa. Ermelo is the seat of the municipality.

== Main places ==
The 2001 census divided the municipality into the following main places:

Place	Code	Area (km^{2})	Population	Most spoken language
Breyten	80201	2.75	4,591	Zulu
Camden	80202	4.78	752	Zulu
Davel	80203	1.61	87	Zulu
Ermelo	80204	25.48	11,596	Zulu
Kwachibikhulu	80205	0.24	2,490	Zulu
KwaDela	80206	0.49	3,548	Zulu
KwaZanele	80207	1.90	7,493	Zulu
Lothair	80208	6.97	93	Zulu
Phumula	80210	2.56	16,295	Zulu
Selindile	80211	1.05	5,340	Zulu
Sheepmoor	80212	1.68	1,229	Zulu
Wesselton	80213	8.34	23,443	Zulu
Remainder of the municipality	80209	5,958.56	47,832	Zulu

== Politics ==
The municipal council consists of thirty-eight members elected by mixed-member proportional representation. Nineteen councillors are elected by first-past-the-post voting in nineteen wards, while the remaining nineteen are chosen from party lists so that the total number of party representatives is proportional to the number of votes received. In the election of 1 November 2021 the African National Congress (ANC) won a majority of twenty-four seats on the council.

The following table shows the results of the election.

Party	Ward			List			Total seats
Party	Votes	%	Seats	Votes	%	Seats	Total seats
African National Congress	16,334	59.46	18	16,992	62.55	6	24
Economic Freedom Fighters	4,676	17.02	0	4,676	17.21	7	7
Democratic Alliance	2,672	9.73	1	2,763	10.17	3	4
Freedom Front Plus	1,677	6.10	0	1,546	5.69	2	2
Independent candidates	1,253	4.56	0				0
African Christian Democratic Party	326	1.19	0	370	1.36	1	1
5 other parties	533	1.94	0	819	3.01	0	0
Total	27,471	100.00	19	27,166	100.00	19	38
Valid votes	27,471	97.90		27,166	96.71		
Invalid/blank votes	589	2.10		923	3.29		
Total votes	28,060	100.00		28,089	100.00		
Registered voters/turnout	69,662	40.28		69,662	40.32		
