= Volksrust =

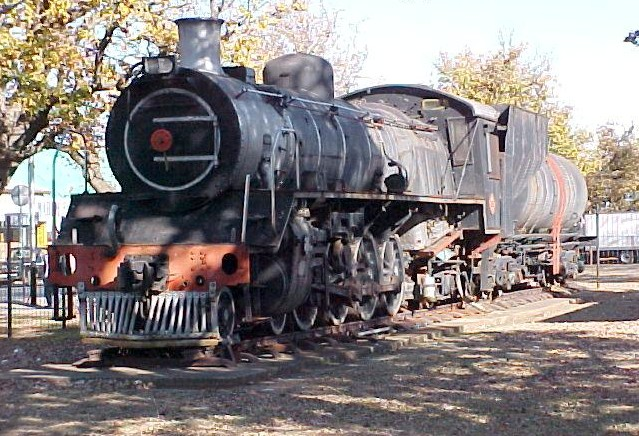
- SAR Class 19D 2696 4-8-2 plinthed in Volksrust, 2 June 2005

- Location within Mpumalanga Location within South Africa
- Coordinates: 27°22′S 29°53′E
- Country: South Africa
- Province: Mpumalanga
- District: Gert Sibande
- Municipality: Pixley ka Seme
- Established: 1888

Area
  - Total: 25.43 km^{2} (9.82 sq mi)
- Elevation: 1,660 m (5,450 ft)

Population (2011)
  - Total: 24,281
  - Density: 954.8/km^{2} (2,473/sq mi)

Racial makeup (2011)
  - Black African: 79.56%
  - White: 16.46%
  - Indian/Asian: 1.99%
  - Coloured: 1.65%
  - Other: 0.34%

First languages (2011)
  - Zulu: 72.38%
  - Afrikaans: 15.77%
  - English: 4.41%
  - Sesotho: 1.74%
  - SiSwati: 1.28%
  - Setswana: 1.13%
  - isiNdebele: 0.96%
  - Other: 0.95%
  - Sign language: 0.45%
  - Sepedi: 0.40%
- Time zone: UTC+2 (SAST)
- Postal code (street): 2470
- PO box: 2470
- Area code: 017

Volksrust is a town in the Mpumalanga province of South Africa near the KwaZulu-Natal provincial border, some 240 km southeast of Johannesburg, 53 km north of Newcastle and 80 km southeast of Standerton.

== History ==
The town was laid out in 1888 on the farms Boschpad Drift, Rooibult or Llanwarne, Verkyk and Zandfontein, and proclaimed in 1889. It lies at an elevation of 5,429 feet (1,655 m), and 4 miles (6.4 km) north of the pass through the Drakensberg known as Laing's Nek. Municipal status was attained in 1904.

Dorothea de Jager, daughter of Dirk Uys, one of the battle victims, named the town Volksrust (Nation's Rest). The name probably refers to the citizens resting here after the Battle of Majuba on 27 February 1881, a decisive battle leading to the Transvaal's victory against the British in the First Boer War. During the Second Boer War, the British authorities built a Boer concentration camp in Volksrust. Visiting officials and army officers described the conditions of the camp as poor, though it suffered a death rate below the Transvaal average. A memorial exists in the Volkrust town square dedicated to the Boer women and children who died in the camp.

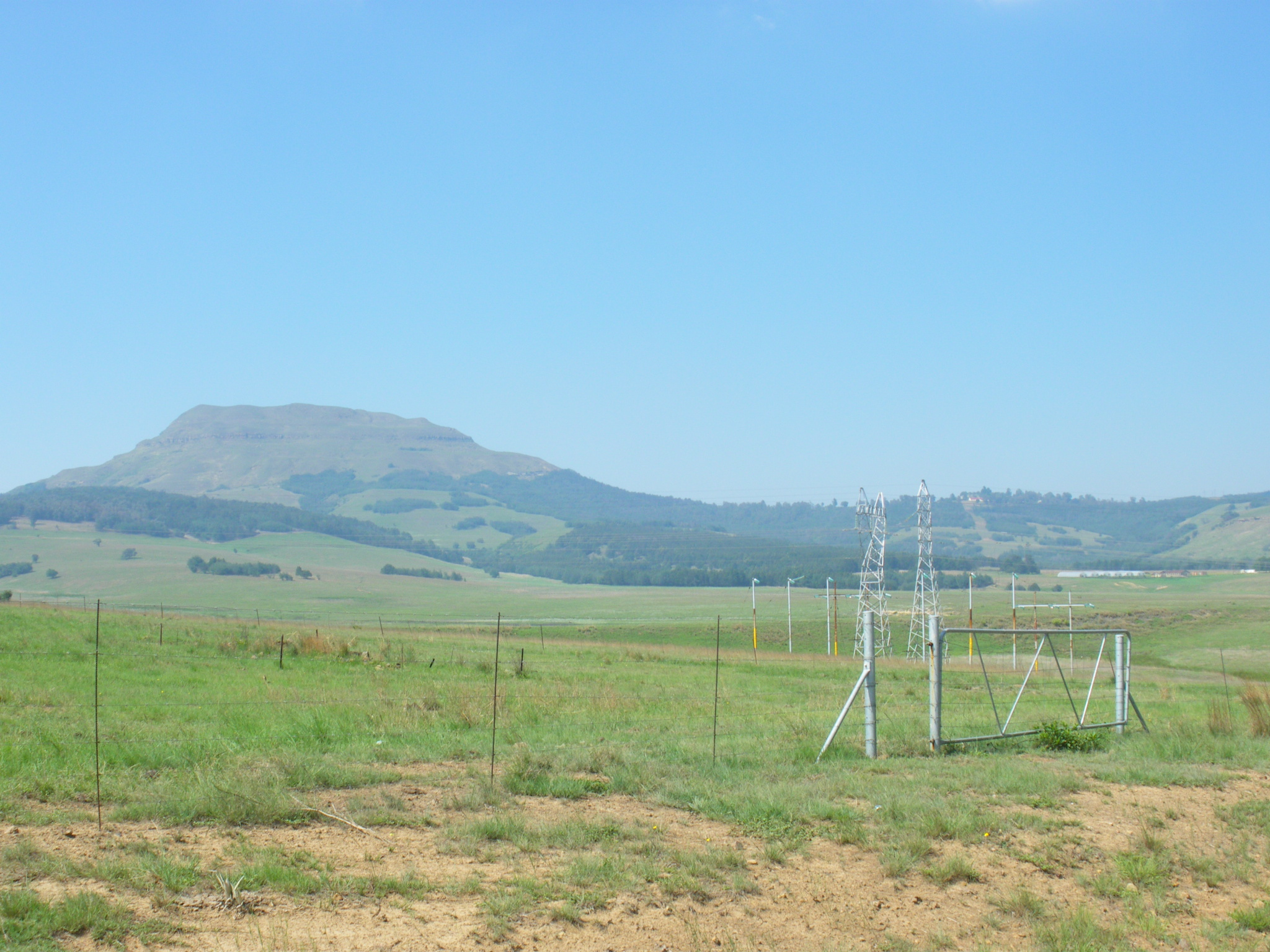
Majuba Hill as seen from Laing's Nek where two decisive battles were fought between the British and Boer forces in the First Boer War

== Agriculture ==
Volksrust has important beef, dairy, maize, sorghum, wool and sunflower seed industries.

== Notable people ==
- Miss World 2014, Rolene Strauss, was born here.
