= Pixley ka Seme Local Municipality =

Pixley Ka Seme
- Local municipality
- Seal

- Location in Mpumalanga
- Coordinates: 26°33′S 29°10′E
- Country: South Africa
- Province: Mpumalanga
- District: Gert Sibande
- Seat: Volksrust
- Wards: 11

Government
  - Type: Municipal council
  - Mayor: Phalaborwa Vincent Malatsi

Area
  - Total: 5,227 km^{2} (2,018 sq mi)

Population (2011)
  - Total: 83,235
  - Density: 15.92/km^{2} (41.24/sq mi)

Racial makeup (2011)
  - Black African: 90.5%
  - Coloured: 0.6%
  - Indian/Asian: 1.2%
  - White: 7.4%

First languages (2011)
  - Zulu: 82.8%
  - Afrikaans: 6.8%
  - English: 2.3%
  - Sotho: 2.2%
  - Other: 5.9%
- Time zone: UTC+2 (SAST)
- Municipal code: MP304

Pixley Ka Seme Municipality (Zulu: UMasipala iPixley ka Seme) is a local municipality within the Gert Sibande District Municipality, in the Mpumalanga province of South Africa. Volksrust is the seat of the municipality.

The municipality is named after Pixley ka Isaka Seme, a founder and president of the African National Congress.

== Main places ==
The 2001 census divided the municipality into the following main places:

Place	Code	Area (km^{2})	Population	Most spoken language
Amersfoort	80401	2.37	1,405	Zulu
Daggakraal	80402	45.97	17,352	Zulu
eSizameleni	80403	1.38	4,875	Zulu
eZamokuhle	80404	6.66	6,933	Zulu
Perdekop	80405	1.88	2,304	Zulu
Siyazenzela	80407	0.42	889	Zulu
Volksrust	80408	20.90	5,676	Afrikaans
Vukuzakhe	80409	3.72	14,792	Zulu
Wakkerstroom	80410	5.89	775	Zulu
Witkoppie	80411	13.44	177	Zulu
Remainder of the municipality	80406	5,125.35	25,556	Zulu

== Politics ==
The municipal council consists of twenty-one members elected by mixed-member proportional representation. Eleven councillors are elected by first-past-the-post voting in eleven wards, while the remaining ten are chosen from party lists so that the total number of party representatives is proportional to the number of votes received. In the election of 1 November 2021 the African National Congress (ANC) won a majority of thirteen seats on the council.

The following table shows the results of the election.

Party	Ward			List			Total seats
Party	Votes	%	Seats	Votes	%	Seats	Total seats
African National Congress	9,953	60.51	11	10,135	60.89	2	13
Economic Freedom Fighters	2,343	14.24	0	2,529	15.19	3	3
Democratic Alliance	1,472	8.95	0	1,461	8.78	2	2
Forum for Service Delivery	610	3.71	0	567	3.41	1	1
Inkatha Freedom Party	522	3.17	0	599	3.60	1	1
African People's Movement	478	2.91	0	435	2.61	1	1
Independent candidates	242	1.47	0				0
5 other parties	828	5.03	0	919	5.52	0	0
Total	16,448	100.00	11	16,645	100.00	10	21
Valid votes	16,448	97.79		16,645	97.44		
Invalid/blank votes	372	2.21		437	2.56		
Total votes	16,820	100.00		17,082	100.00		
Registered voters/turnout	37,767	44.54		37,767	45.23		
