= Albert Luthuli Local Municipality =

Coordinates: 26°33′S 29°10′E

Albert Luthuli
- Local municipality
- Seal

- Location in Mpumalanga
- Country: South Africa
- Province: Mpumalanga
- District: Gert Sibande
- Seat: Carolina
- Wards: 25

Government
  - Type: Municipal council

Area
  - Total: 5,559 km^{2} (2,146 sq mi)

Population (2011)
  - Total: 186,010
  - Density: 33.46/km^{2} (86.66/sq mi)

Racial makeup (2011)
  - Black African: 97.6%
  - Coloured: 0.2%
  - Indian/Asian: 0.4%
  - White: 1.6%

First languages (2011)
  - Swazi: 57.0%
  - Zulu: 34.8%
  - English: 2.0%
  - Afrikaans: 1.6%
  - Other: 4.6%
- Time zone: UTC+2 (SAST)
- Municipal code: MP301

Albert Luthuli Municipality (Swazi: Masipaladi iAlbert Luthuli; Zulu: UMasipala iAlbert Luthuli) is a local municipality within the Gert Sibande District Municipality, in the Mpumalanga province of South Africa. It was named after Albert Luthuli. Carolina is the seat of the municipality.

== Main places ==
The 2001 census divided the municipality into the following main places:

Place	Code	Area (km^{2})	Population	Most spoken language
Badplaas	80102	0.86	276	Swazi, Afrikaans
Bhevula	80103	11.91	4,092	Swazi
Carolina	80104	18.69	2,952	Afrikaans, Zulu
Diepgezet	80105	4.89	229	Swazi
Duma	80106	28.80	1,760	Zulu
Eerstehoek	80107	638.65	41,780	Zulu
Ekulundeni	80108	1.49	4,490	Swazi
Embhuleni	80109	63.37	45,249	Swazi
Emfumbeni	80110	24.29	1,314	Zulu
Emjindini	80111	12.41	1,202	Swazi
Empuluzi	80112	0.28	3	Swazi
Enikakuyengwa	80113	73.34	9,235	Swazi
Lukwatini	80114	4.86	5,181	Swazi
Mandlamakhulu	80115	17.87	1,067	Swazi
Mpisikazi	80116	49.57	19,415	Zulu
Mpuluzi	80117	7.84	11,855	Zulu
Ndlela	80118	14.56	3,012	Swazi
Sandleni	80119	27.06	544	Zulu
Silobela	80120	1.97	9,167	Zulu
Steynsdorp	80121	1.14	585	Swazi
Tshabalala	80122	2.32	3,296	Zulu
Remainder of the municipality	80101	4,566.75	21,242	Swazi

== Politics ==
The municipal council consists of forty-nine members elected by mixed-member proportional representation. Twenty-five councillors are elected by first-past-the-post voting in twenty-five wards, while the remaining twenty-four are chosen from party lists so that the total number of party representatives is proportional to the number of votes received. In the 2021 South African municipal elections the African National Congress (ANC) won a majority of thirty-nine seats on the council.

The following table shows the results of the election.

Party	Ward			List			Total seats
Party	Votes	%	Seats	Votes	%	Seats	Total seats
African National Congress	29,852	75.08	25	30,472	77.04	13	38
Economic Freedom Fighters	6,550	16.47	0	6,616	16.73	8	8
Democratic Alliance	1,030	2.59	0	1,098	2.78	1	1
Independent candidates	1,103	2.77	0				0
Inkatha Freedom Party	530	1.33	0	573	1.45	1	1
African People's Convention	274	0.69	0	274	0.69	1	1
2 other parties	421	1.06	0	520	1.31	0	0
Total	39,760	100.00	25	39,553	100.00	24	49
Valid votes	39,760	98.09		39,553	98.05		
Invalid/blank votes	776	1.91		788	1.95		
Total votes	40,536	100.00		40,341	100.00		
Registered voters/turnout	92,803	43.68		92,803	43.47		
