= Gert Sibande District Municipality =

South African municipal district

Coordinates: 26°33′S 29°10′E

Gert Sibande Eastvaal District
- District municipality
- Seal

- Location in South Africa
- Country: South Africa
- Province: Mpumalanga
- Seat: Ermelo
- Local municipalities: List: Albert Luthuli; Msukaligwa; Mkhondo; Pixley Ka Seme; Lekwa; Dipaleseng; Govan Mbeki

Government
  - Type: Municipal council
  - Mayor: Muzi Chirwa (African National Congress)

Area
  - Total: 31,841 km^{2} (12,294 sq mi)

Population (2011)
  - Total: 1,043,194
  - Density: 32.763/km^{2} (84.855/sq mi)

Racial makeup (2011)
  - Black African: 88.6%
  - Coloured: 1.0%
  - Indian/Asian: 1.1%
  - White: 9.0%

First languages (2011)
  - Zulu: 60.9%
  - Swazi: 13.0%
  - Afrikaans: 9.1%
  - Sotho: 4.2%
  - Other: 12.8%
- Time zone: UTC+2 (SAST)
- Municipal code: DC30

Gert Sibande (until 2004 known as the Eastvaal District Municipality) is one of the 3 districts of Mpumalanga province of South Africa. The seat of Gert Sibande is Ermelo. The majority of its 900,007 people speak IsiZulu (2001 Census). The district code is DC30. On 15 October 2004, the municipality changed its name from the "Eastvaal" (Afrikaans: Oosvaal) to "Gert Sibande" District Municipality. The district is named after the ANC activist Gert Sibande.

== Geography ==
=== Neighbours ===
Gert Sibande is surrounded by:

- Nkangala to the north (DC31)
- Ehlanzeni to the north-east (DC32)
- The kingdom of Eswatini to the east
- Zululand to the south-east (DC26)
- Amajuba to the south (DC25)
- Thabo Mofutsanyane to the south-west (DC19)
- Fezile Dabi to the south-west(DC20)
- Sedibeng to the west (DC42)

=== Local municipalities ===
The district contains the following local municipalities:

| Local municipality | Population | % | Dominant language |
|---|---|---|---|
| Govan Mbeki | 221 757 | 24.64% | Zulu |
| Albert Luthuli | 187 935 | 20.88% | Swazi |
| Mkhondo | 142 878 | 15.88% | Zulu |
| Msukaligwa | 124 807 | 13.87% | Zulu |
| Lekwa | 103 264 | 11.47% | Zulu |
| Pixley Ka Seme | 80 742 | 8.97% | Zulu |
| Dipaleseng | 38 620 | 4.29% | Zulu |

== Demographics ==
The following statistics are from the 2001 census.

| Language | Population | % |
|---|---|---|
| IsiZulu | 544 669 | 60.52% |
| SiSwati | 158 623 | 17.62% |
| Afrikaans | 70 236 | 7.80% |
| Sesotho | 45 828 | 5.09% |
| IsiNdebele | 23 985 | 2.66% |
| IsiXhosa | 21 055 | 2.34% |
| English | 14 514 | 1.61% |
| Sepedi | 7 742 | 0.86% |
| Xitsonga | 6 345 | 0.70% |
| Setswana | 3 531 | 0.39% |
| Other | 2 339 | 0.26% |
| Tshivenda | 1 133 | 0.13% |

=== Gender ===
| Gender | Population | % |
|---|---|---|
| Female | 466 592 | 51.84% |
| Male | 433 415 | 48.16% |

=== Ethnic group ===
| Ethnic group | Population | % |
|---|---|---|
| Black | 816 278 | 90.70% |
| White | 72 109 | 8.01% |
| Coloured | 6 022 | 0.67% |
| Indian/Asian | 5 598 | 0.62% |

=== Age ===
| Age | Population | % |
|---|---|---|
| 000 - 004 | 101 470 | 11.27% |
| 005 - 009 | 105 250 | 11.69% |
| 010 - 014 | 110 915 | 12.32% |
| 015 - 019 | 106 277 | 11.81% |
| 020 - 024 | 79 806 | 8.87% |
| 025 - 029 | 72 626 | 8.07% |
| 030 - 034 | 63 520 | 7.06% |
| 035 - 039 | 60 596 | 6.73% |
| 040 - 044 | 51 378 | 5.71% |
| 045 - 049 | 40 374 | 4.49% |
| 050 - 054 | 30 407 | 3.38% |
| 055 - 059 | 21 345 | 2.37% |
| 060 - 064 | 19 074 | 2.12% |
| 065 - 069 | 12 943 | 1.44% |
| 070 - 074 | 10 392 | 1.15% |
| 075 - 079 | 5 726 | 0.64% |
| 080 - 084 | 5 164 | 0.57% |
| 085 - 089 | 1 555 | 0.17% |
| 090 - 094 | 707 | 0.08% |
| 095 - 099 | 296 | 0.03% |
| 100 plus | 186 | 0.02% |

== Politics ==
=== Election results ===
Election results for Gert Sibande in the South African general election, 2004.

- Population 18 and over: 517 104 [57.46% of total population]
- Total votes: 319 593 [35.51% of total population]
- Voting % estimate: 61.80% votes as a % of population 18 and over

| Party | Votes | % |
|---|---|---|
| African National Congress | 264 118 | 82.64% |
| Democratic Alliance | 26 262 | 8.22% |
| Inkhata Freedom Party | 7 977 | 2.50% |
| Freedom Front Plus | 5 398 | 1.69% |
| African Christian Democratic Party | 3 921 | 1.23% |
| United Democratic Movement | 3 639 | 1.14% |
| Pan African Congress | 2 661 | 0.83% |
| New National Party | 1 560 | 0.49% |
| Independent Democrats | 971 | 0.30% |
| Azanian People's Organisation | 572 | 0.18% |
| United Christian Democratic Party | 435 | 0.14% |
| SOPA | 407 | 0.13% |
| NA | 276 | 0.09% |
| EMSA | 256 | 0.08% |
| Christian Democratic Party | 234 | 0.07% |
| Peace and Justice Congress | 223 | 0.07% |
| UF | 203 | 0.06% |
| TOP | 167 | 0.05% |
| Minority Front | 133 | 0.04% |
| New Labour Party | 91 | 0.03% |
| Keep It Straight and Simple Party | 89 | 0.03% |
| Total | 319 593 | 100.00% |
