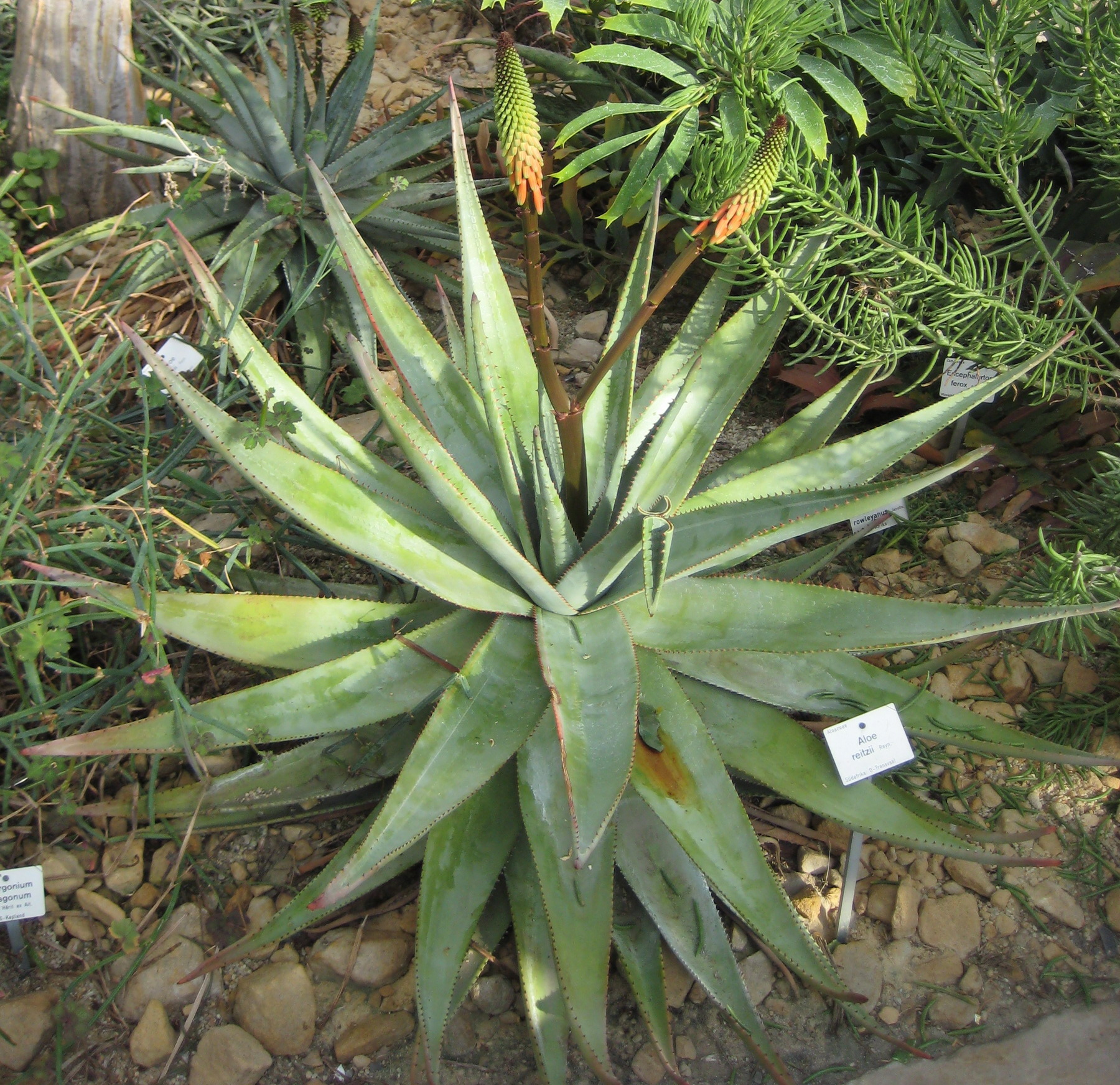

Conservation status
- CITES Appendix II (CITES)

Scientific classification
- Kingdom: Plantae
- Clade: Tracheophytes
- Clade: Angiosperms
- Clade: Monocots
- Order: Asparagales
- Family: Asphodelaceae
- Subfamily: Asphodeloideae
- Genus: Aloe
- Species: A. reitzii

Binomial name
- Aloe reitzii Reynolds, 1937

Varieties
- Aloe reitzii var. reitzii; Aloe reitzii var. vernalis D.S.Hardy

= Aloe reitzii =

Species of succulent

Aloe reitzii, the Reitz aloe, is a rare and endangered Southern African aloe. Two varieties are recognized: var. reitzii which only grows in the Tonteldoos valley, between Roossenekal and Dullstroom in the wild and var. vernalis which is found in the northern part of KwaZulu-Natal. They are also thought to occur in Eswatini. The species is named after F.W. Reitz, the former president of the Orange Free State and state secretary of the Zuid-Afrikaansche Republiek.

== Description ==
Aloe reitzii is usually a stemless, short plant with a single rosette that does not grow taller than 1.5 meters. The leaves are sea green and waxy. They usually grow upwards. Both surfaces of young plants' leaves are usually covered with thorns, but these disappear as the plants age, except that a single row of spines is usually visible on the back of young leaves. The latter characteristic helps to identify the species, even if it does not flower.
