= Dalmanutha, South Africa =

Dalmanutha
- Location within Mpumalanga Location within South Africa
- Coordinates: 25.756°S 30.170°E
- Country: South Africa
- Province: Mpumalanga
- District: Nkangala
- Municipality: Emakhazeni
- Time zone: UTC+2 (SAST)

Dalmanutha is a railway station some 16 km east of Belfast, on the route between Pretoria and Maputo. Named after the farm, which in turn takes its name from a biblical town on the Sea of Galilee (Mark 8:10). The name is said to mean 'house of widowhood'. The area is known to the local inhabitants as Monometsi. A clash between the Bakoni and Matabele occurred here. It was also the scene of the last pitched battle of the Second Anglo-Boer War (1899-1902) which took place from 25 August 1900.
