= Disa zuluensis =

Scientific classification
- Kingdom: Plantae
- Clade: Tracheophytes
- Clade: Angiosperms
- Clade: Monocots
- Order: Asparagales
- Family: Orchidaceae
- Subfamily: Orchidoideae
- Genus: Disa
- Species: D. zuluensis

Binomial name
- Disa zuluensis Rolfe

Species of flowering plant

Disa zuluensis is a perennial plant and geophyte belonging to the genus Disa. In South Africa, the plant is endemic to KwaZulu-Natal, Limpopo and Mpumalanga. The plant occurs at Dundee and from Roossenekal to Dullstroom. It has an area of occurrence of 122 km2 and there are four subpopulations. The species grows in swampy or marshy environments at altitudes of 1500 - 2000 m. The plant is threatened by mining that extracts the water from the marshes or drains them, overgrazing and invasive plants. Mining is the greatest threat for the immediate future.
