= R577 (South Africa) =

Regional route in South Africa

Regional route R577

Route information
- Length: 64.6 km (40.1 mi)

Major junctions
- West end: R555 in Roossenekal
- East end: R540 near Lydenburg

Location
- Country: South Africa

Highway system
- Numbered routes of South Africa
← R576	→ R578

The R577 is a Regional Route in South Africa that connects Roossenekal with Lydenburg.

== Route ==
Its western terminus is a junction with the R555 at Roossenekal, Limpopo. It heads east, becoming the Jaap-se-Hoogte Pass, then becoming the De Berg Pass through the Steenkampsberg mountains, to end at an intersection with the R540 south of Mashishing (Lydenburg), Mpumalanga.
