= Crocodile River (Mpumalanga) =

River in South Africa

Crocodile River Krokodilrivier
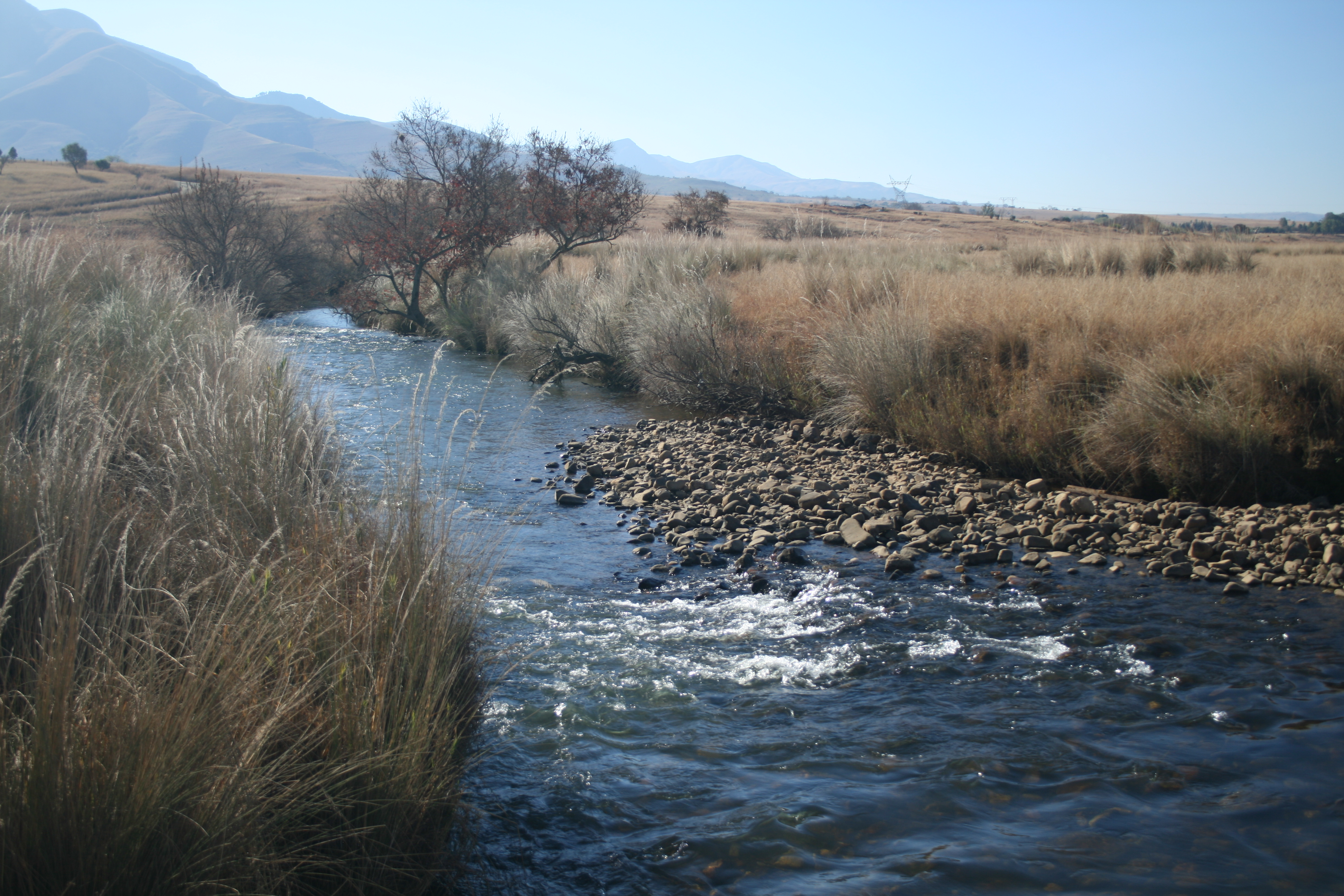
- The river upstream of Kwena Dam

- Location of the Crocodile River's mouth

Location
- Country: South Africa
- Region: Mpumalanga Province

Physical characteristics
- Source: Steenkampsberg
  - location: North of Dullstroom
- Mouth: Komati River
  - location: Komatipoort
  - coordinates: 25°26′18″S 31°58′35″E
- Basin size: 10,446 km^{2} (4,033 sq mi)

The Crocodile River, also referred to as Crocodile River (East), (Afrikaans: Krokodilrivier) is a large river traversing Mpumalanga province of South Africa. It is a tributary of the Komati River.

== Course ==
It originates north of Dullstroom, Mpumalanga, in the Steenkampsberg Mountains. Downstream of Kwena Dam, the Crocodile River winds through the Schoemanskloof and down the Montrose Falls. It then flows eastwards past Nelspruit and joins the Komati River at Komatipoort.

The Crocodile River in Mpumalanga has a catchment area of 10,446 km^{2}. Upstream it is a popular trout fishing place. It flows through the Nelspruit industrial area, the Lowveld agricultural area and borders the Kruger National Park. The decrease in the flow of the river is due to water abstractions for irrigated fruit and sugar cane farming.

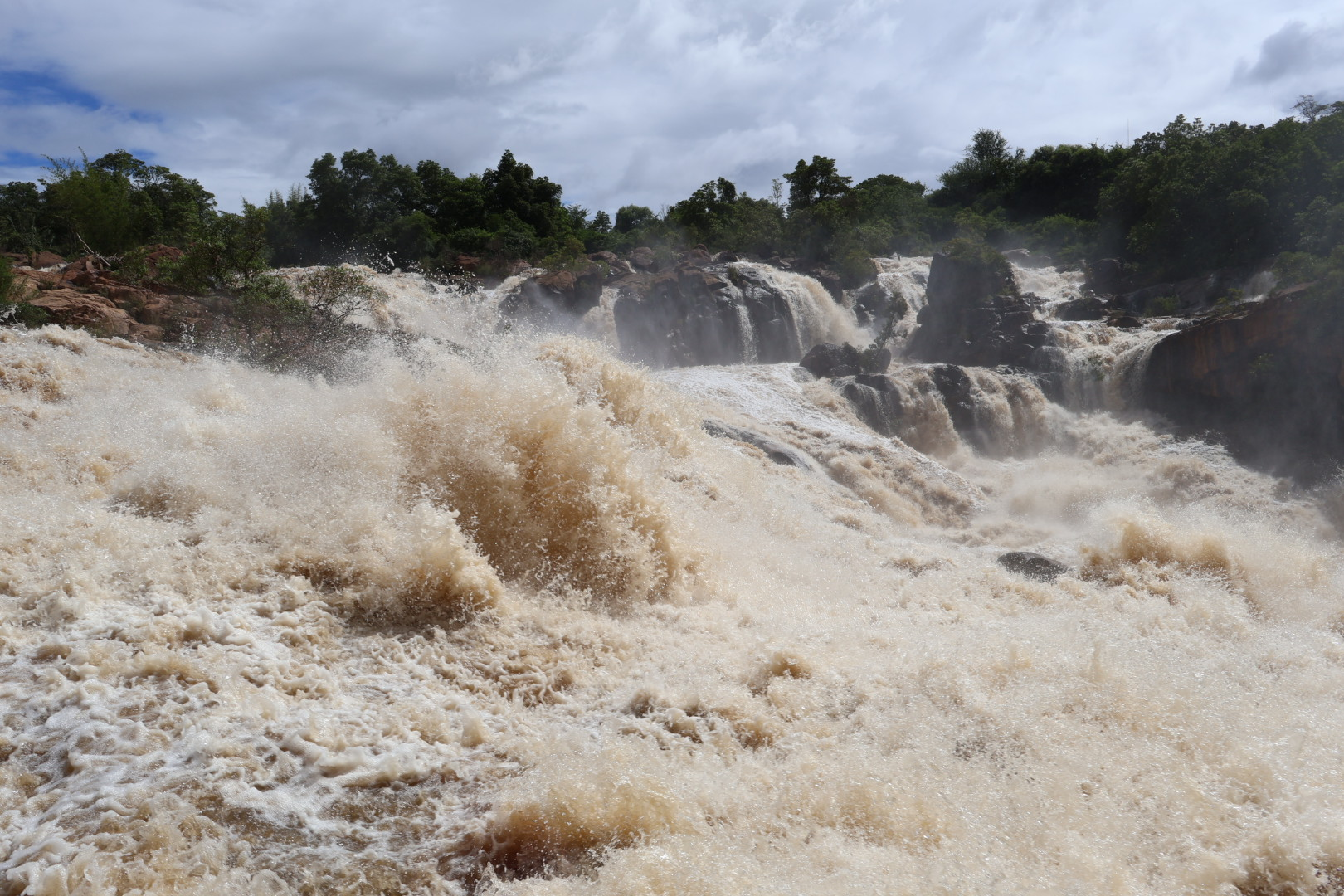
The Crocodile River in the Lowveld National Botanical Garden in flood in January 2026

== Tributaries ==
The Elands River and Nels River are the tributaries to the Crocodile. Elands River, famous for its waterfalls, rises on the grassland plateau of the Drakensberg mountains near the town of Machadodorp while the Nels River rises on the Drakensberg as well .

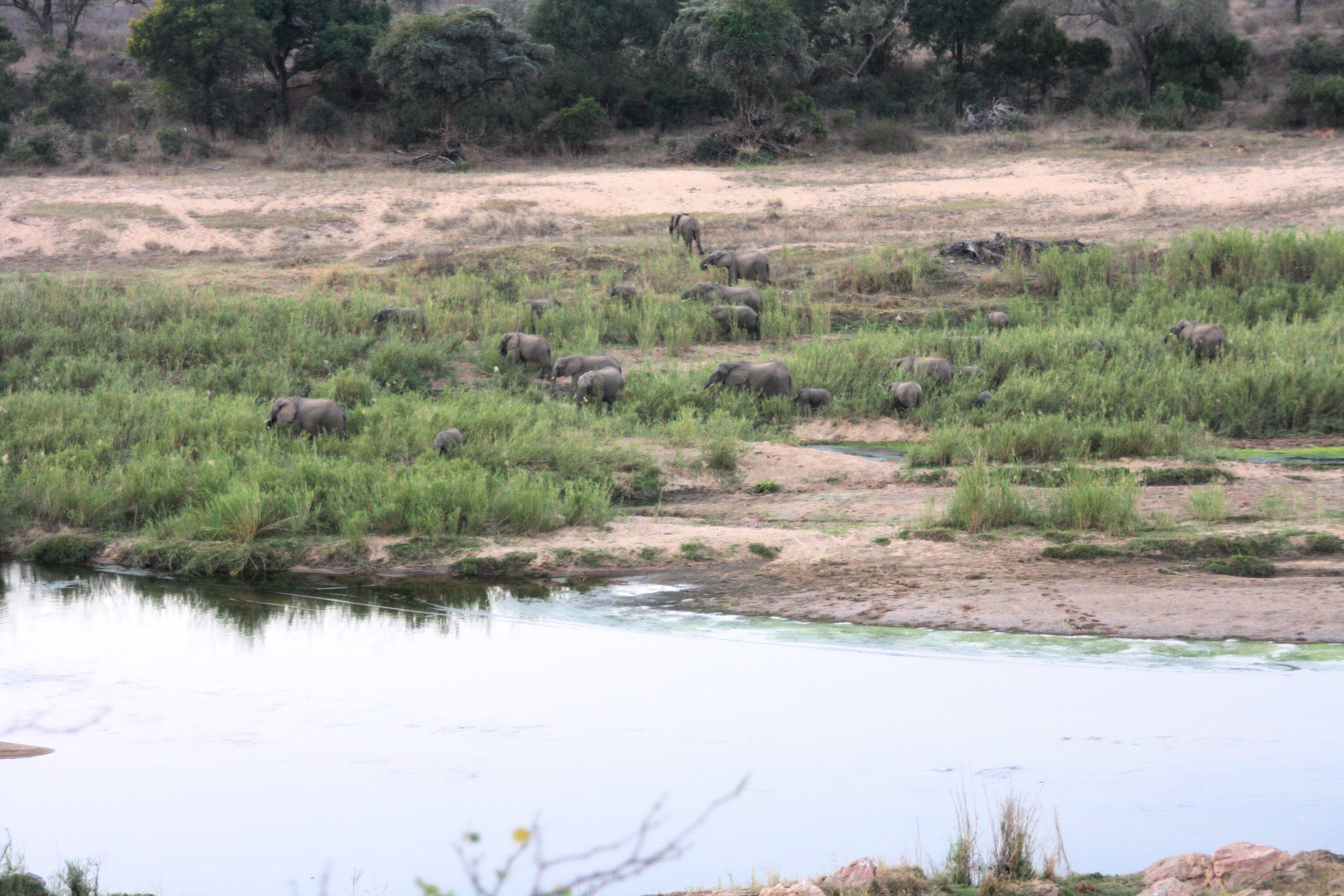
View of the river from Marloth Park

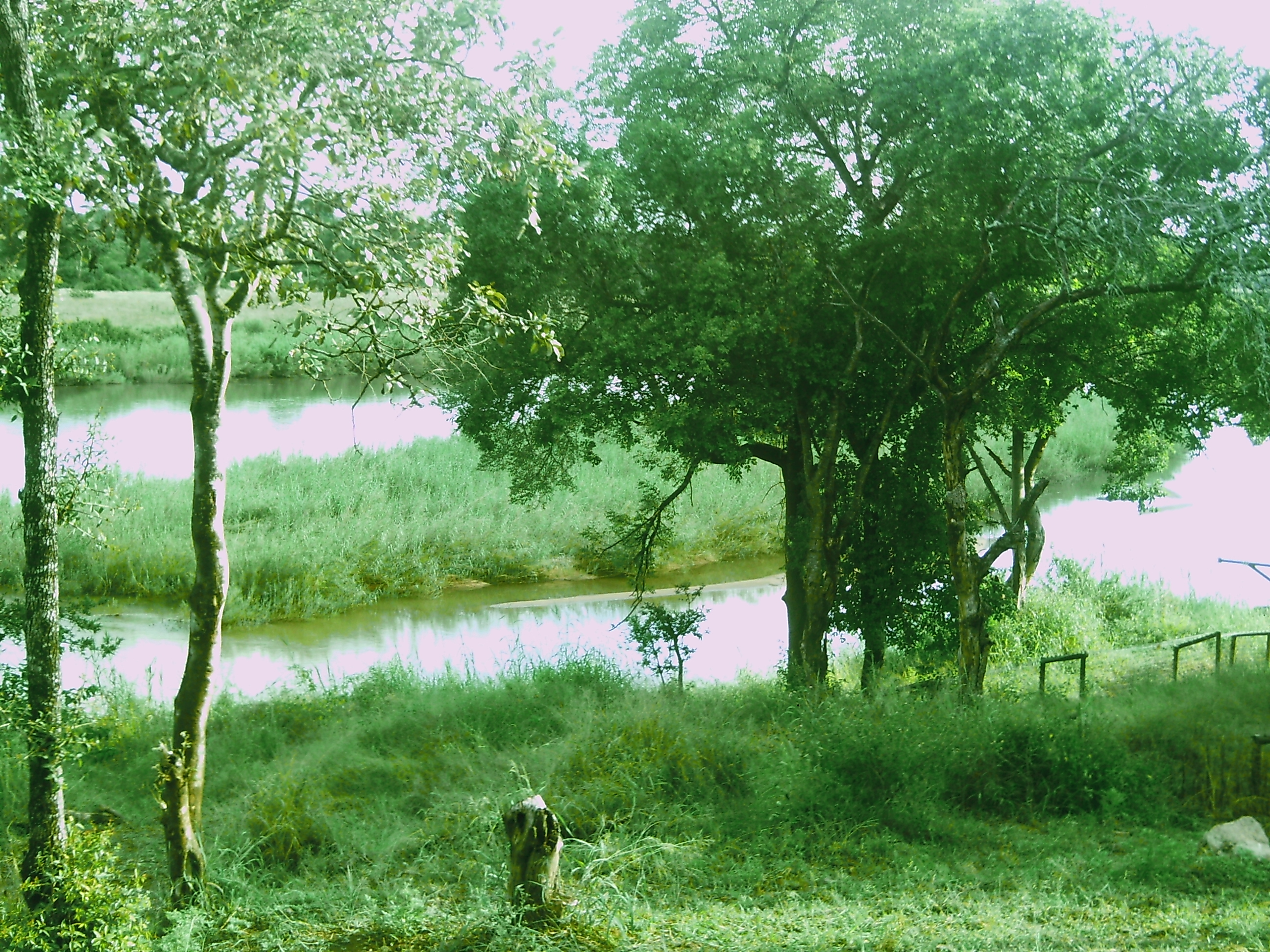
View of the river from Ngwenya Lodge during the wet season

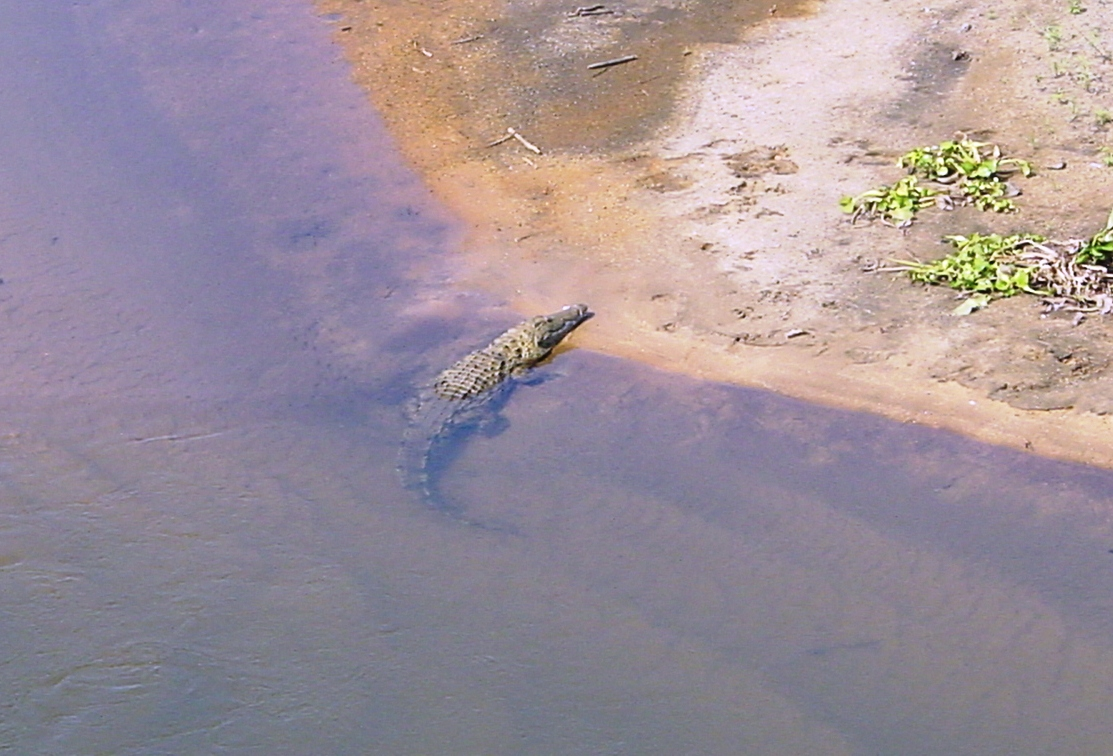
Nile crocodile resting on the river bank, near Malalane

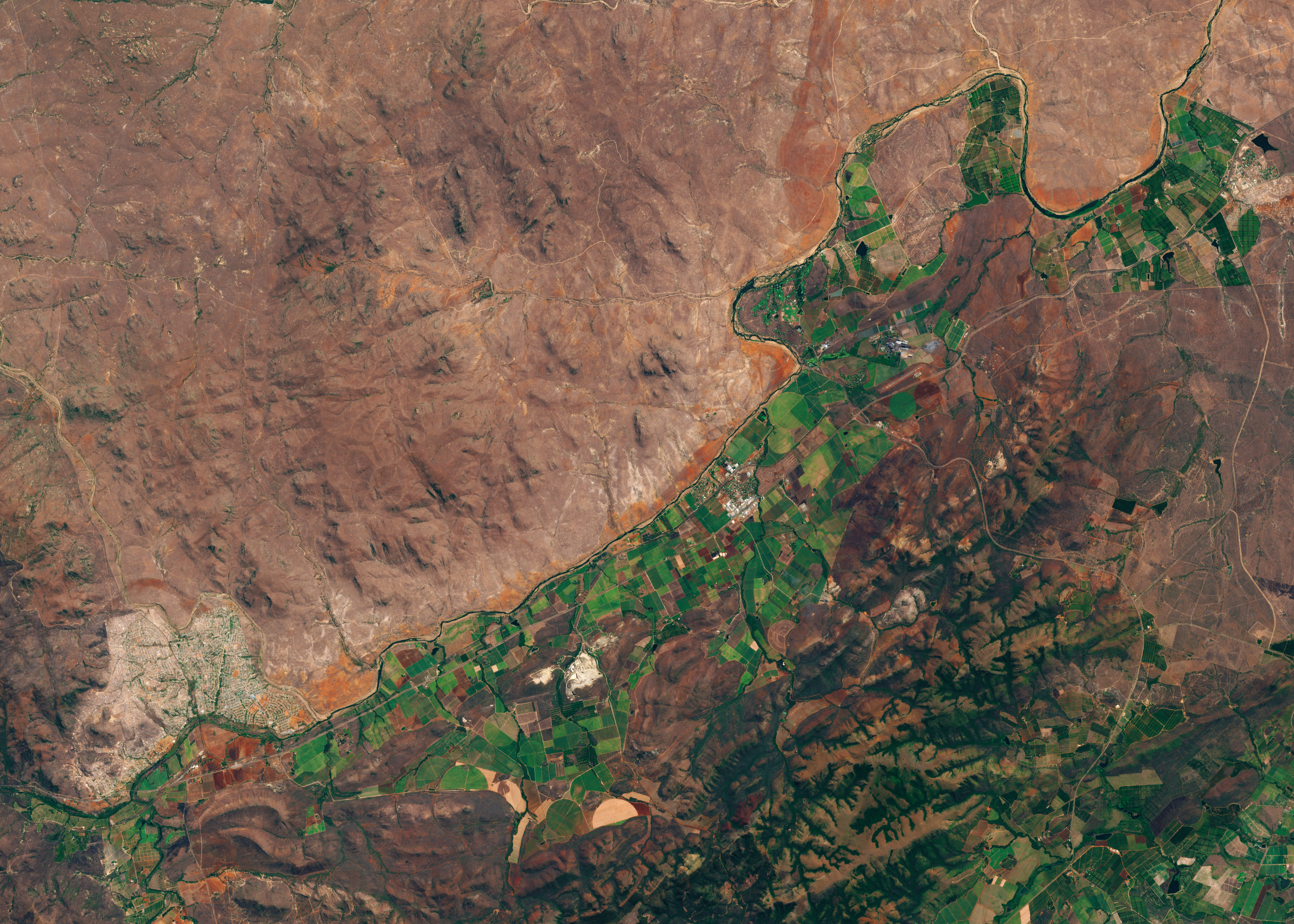
Irrigation on the right bank, and the Kruger Park on its left bank, as observed by Sentinel-2

== See also ==
- List of rivers of South Africa
- List of reservoirs and dams in South Africa
