= R540 (South Africa) =

Regional route in South Africa

Regional route R540

Route information
- Length: 86.2 km (53.6 mi)

Major junctions
- South-west end: R33 at Belfast
- R577 at Lydenburg
- North-east end: R36 at Lydenburg

Location
- Country: South Africa

Highway system
- Numbered routes of South Africa
← R539	→ R541

The R540 is a Regional Route in Mpumalanga, South Africa that connects Belfast with Lydenburg via Dullstroom.

== Route ==
Its southwestern origin is from the R33 in Belfast (eMakhazeni). It heads north-east, through the town of Dullstroom, to reach the southern part of Mashishing (Lydenburg), where it meets the eastern terminus of the R577 before ending at an intersection with the R36.

== R540 (Gauteng) ==
There is also a 22-kilometre road in Mogale City Local Municipality, West Rand District Municipality, Gauteng that is designated as the R540. It starts at an intersection with the R512 road just north of the border with Lanseria International Airport, City of Johannesburg Metropolitan Municipality and goes west to meet the northern terminus of the M5 road of Johannesburg, before turning south-west and ending at an intersection with the N14 national route north of the city of Krugersdorp.
