= Meyer de Kock =

South African execution victim (1849–1901)

- Born: 5 October 1849
- Died: 12 February 1901 (aged 51); Farm Windhoek, near Dullstroom, Mpumalanga in the former Transvaal Colony
- Cause of death: Execution by firing squad
- Burial place: Farm Windhoek, near Dullstroom, Mpumalanga; 25°22.89′S 30°00.536′E

Meyer de Kock (5 October 1849 – 12 February 1901) was a citizen of the Zuid-Afrikaansche Republiek ("ZAR") during the Second Anglo-Boer War. After the British had captured the capital Pretoria and annexed the Transvaal, he surrendered on 10 December 1900. In January 1901, he went to the eastern Transvaal to persuade burghers still in the field to surrender. He was arrested, court-martialled, and later, on 12 February 1901, executed by firing squad.

== The War ==
Prior to the Second Anglo-Boer War Meyer de Kock was a businessman living with his wife in Belfast in the eastern part of the ZAR. He was a dignified, progressive and well-liked man from a good family. When war broke out in October 1899, de Kock did not join his local commando but remained behind to guard the bridges and railway line from Lourenço Marques (Maputo) to Pretoria. After Lord Roberts captured Pretoria on 5 June 1900, his army swept down the railway line past Belfast and reached the Portuguese border by 25 September 1900. The ZAR was annexed by the British Crown on 25 October 1900.

Like many other burghers, De Kock regarded the war as having been lost and he voluntarily surrendered to the British garrison in Belfast on 10 December 1900. His first reason for surrendering was that his wife was a refined woman not used to the hardships of war. As head of his family, he had to relieve them from their difficult situation. He also wanted to prevent British troops from damaging his property as they were already doing. Lastly, he wanted to complain to the British authorities about Boer houses being burnt down and their women being molested.

== The Peace Committees ==
De Kock was taken to Pretoria, where he was interviewed by Colonel D. Henderson, the head of British military intelligence, and also by Lord Kitchener, to whom he conveyed his complaints about British troops. Shortly thereafter he met a number of other burghers who had decided to surrender. They discussed various ways in which peace could be made. They decided to return to their own districts, form local peace committees, and approach the burghers in the field to try and persuade them to surrender.

De Kock returned to Belfast and started a local peace committee, of which he became the secretary. He wrote to local Boer officers in the field, inviting them to discuss the advantages of laying down their arms. On 22 January 1901 he decided to visit the Boer Commandos where they were then camping on the Steenkamps Mountain, some 20 miles from Belfast.

== Arrest and trial ==
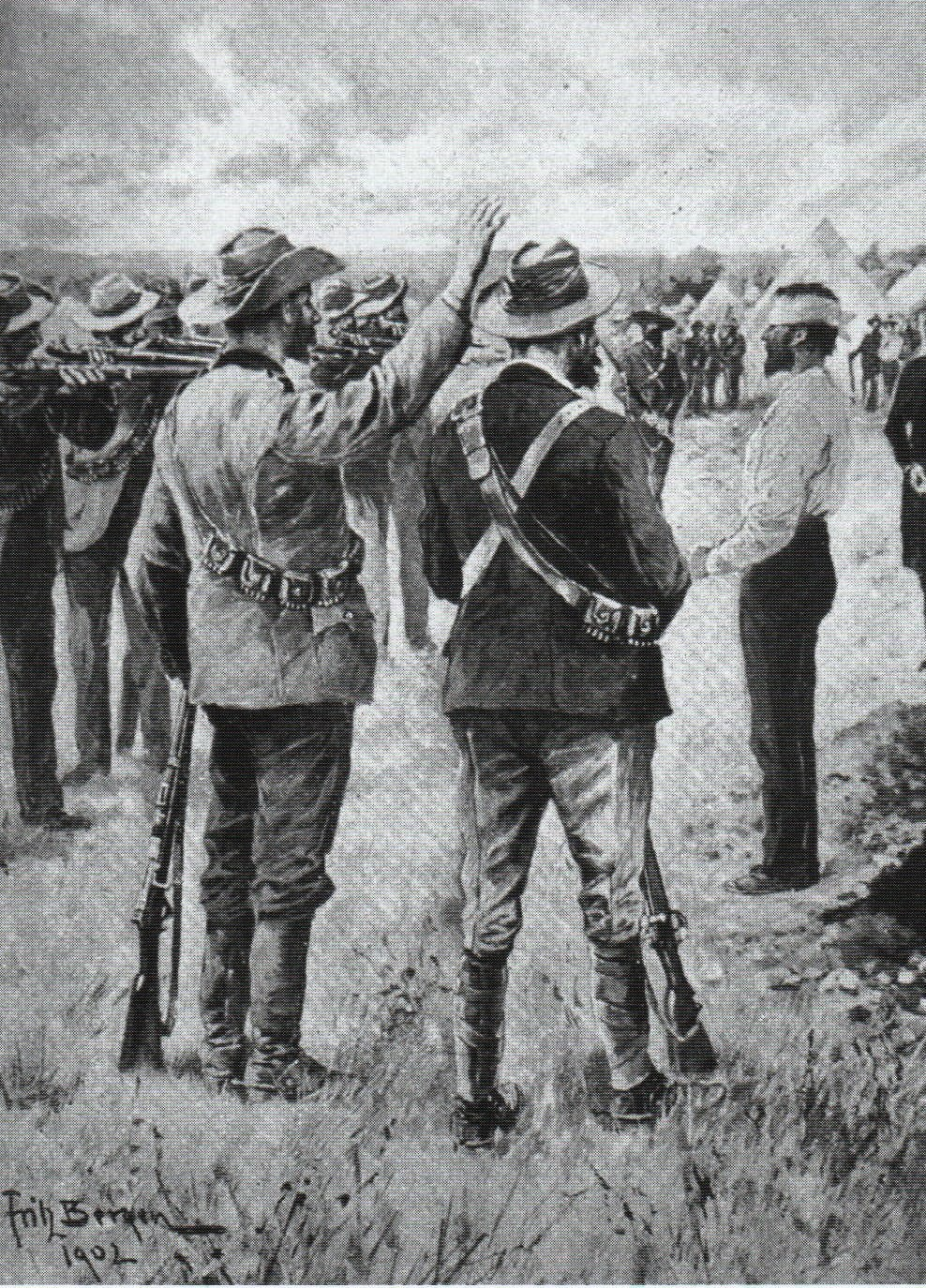
Execution of De Kock next to open grave

When De Kock arrived at the Boers' pickets, he was arrested immediately and taken to General Muller. Muller sent him to the government laager on Tautesberg. On 29 January 1901, De Kock appeared before a special military court consisting of a magistrate (landdrost) Gideon F. Joubert, as chairman and two additional members. H.L.J. Jacobs, an Assistant State Attorney, prosecuted while a certain Brugman acted as Registrar. De Kock did not have legal representation.

The charge against De Kock was one of high treason and the prosecution relied on four instances. In the first instance, it was alleged that he had left his commando and handed his weapons to the enemy. To this charge, he pleaded guilty but added that if he had not done so, his family would have been ejected from their home or suffered in some other way. He pleaded not guilty on the second count that he had unlawfully cooperated with the enemy to persuade burghers to lay their weapons down. Thirdly it was alleged that he had left the enemy's lines with Peace Committee documents, in which burghers were encouraged to lay down their arms. He pleaded guilty but explained that it was done with good intentions to promote peace. He also pleaded guilty to the fourth charge that he tried to persuade two named burghers to lay down their arms. A number of witnesses were called in support of the charges. De Kock handed in an affidavit and he was cross-examined.

At the end of the trial, the court found De Kock guilty of high treason and sentenced him to death. The government confirmed the conviction and sentence.

== Execution ==
De Kock was sent back to the commandos to be executed by firing squad. On 12 February 1901, he was shot next to his open grave. The location of the gravestone is 25°22.89'S, 30°00.536'E (WGS84).

== Sources ==
- Pakenham, Thomas. The Boer War Weidenfeld & Nicolson, London, 1979.
- Viljoen, Ben Johannes. My Reminiscences of the Anglo-Boer War. Hood, Douglas & Howard, London, 1902. Also available in Kindle.
- Muller, C.H. Oorlogsherinneringe van generaal Chris H. Muller. Nasionale Pers, Cape Town, 1936.
- South African National Archives and Records Service: Transvaal Archives Depository (TAB), PMO 23 1612/01.
- Grundlingh, A.M. Die "Hendsoppers" en "Joiners". Protea Boekhuis, Pretoria, 1999.
- Schikkerling, R.W. Commando Courageous (A Boer's Diary). Johannesburg, 1964.
- Blake, Albert. Boereverraaier. Tafelberg, Cape Town, 2010.
