= Disa alticola =

Scientific classification
- Kingdom: Plantae
- Clade: Tracheophytes
- Clade: Angiosperms
- Clade: Monocots
- Order: Asparagales
- Family: Orchidaceae
- Subfamily: Orchidoideae
- Genus: Disa
- Species: D. alticola

Binomial name
- Disa alticola H.P.Linder

Species of flowering plant

Disa alticola is a perennial plant and geophyte belonging to the genus Disa. The species is endemic to Mpumalanga and occurs on the Steenkampsberg and the Long Tom Pass. The plant is threatened by overgrazing and trampling by livestock.
