= De Berg Pass =

Coordinates: 25°13′48″S 30°09′36″E

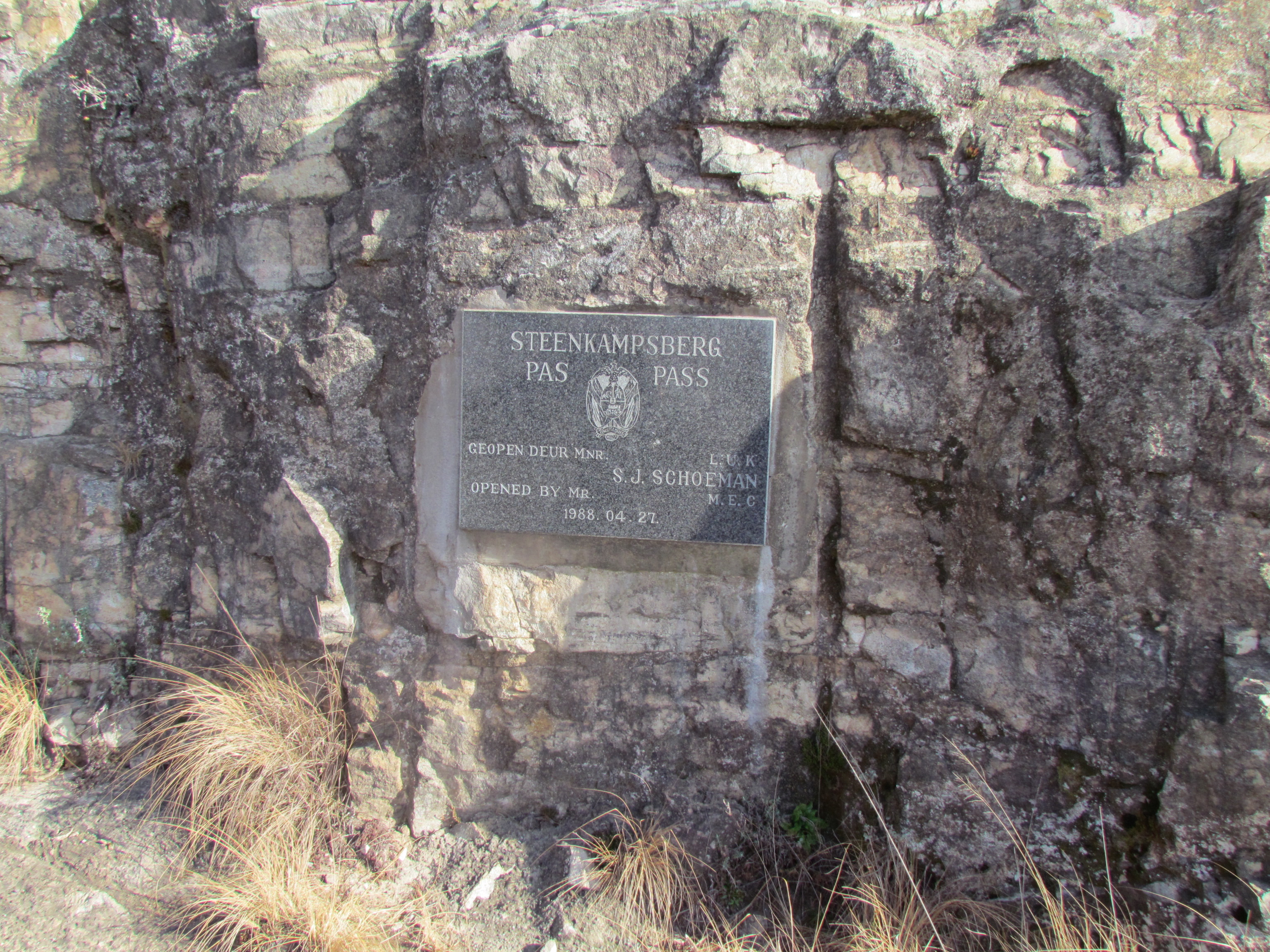
A plaque commemorating the opening of the pass in 1988

The De Berg Pass (also Steenkampsberg Pass) was opened in 1988, and is situated on the R577 road between Lydenburg and Roossenekal, in Mpumalanga, South Africa. It is the highest pass in Mpumalanga, and skirts the southern slopes of De Berg, the highest point of the Steenkampsberg.
