= Steenkampsberg, Northern Cape =

Coordinates: 32°10′S 21°39′E

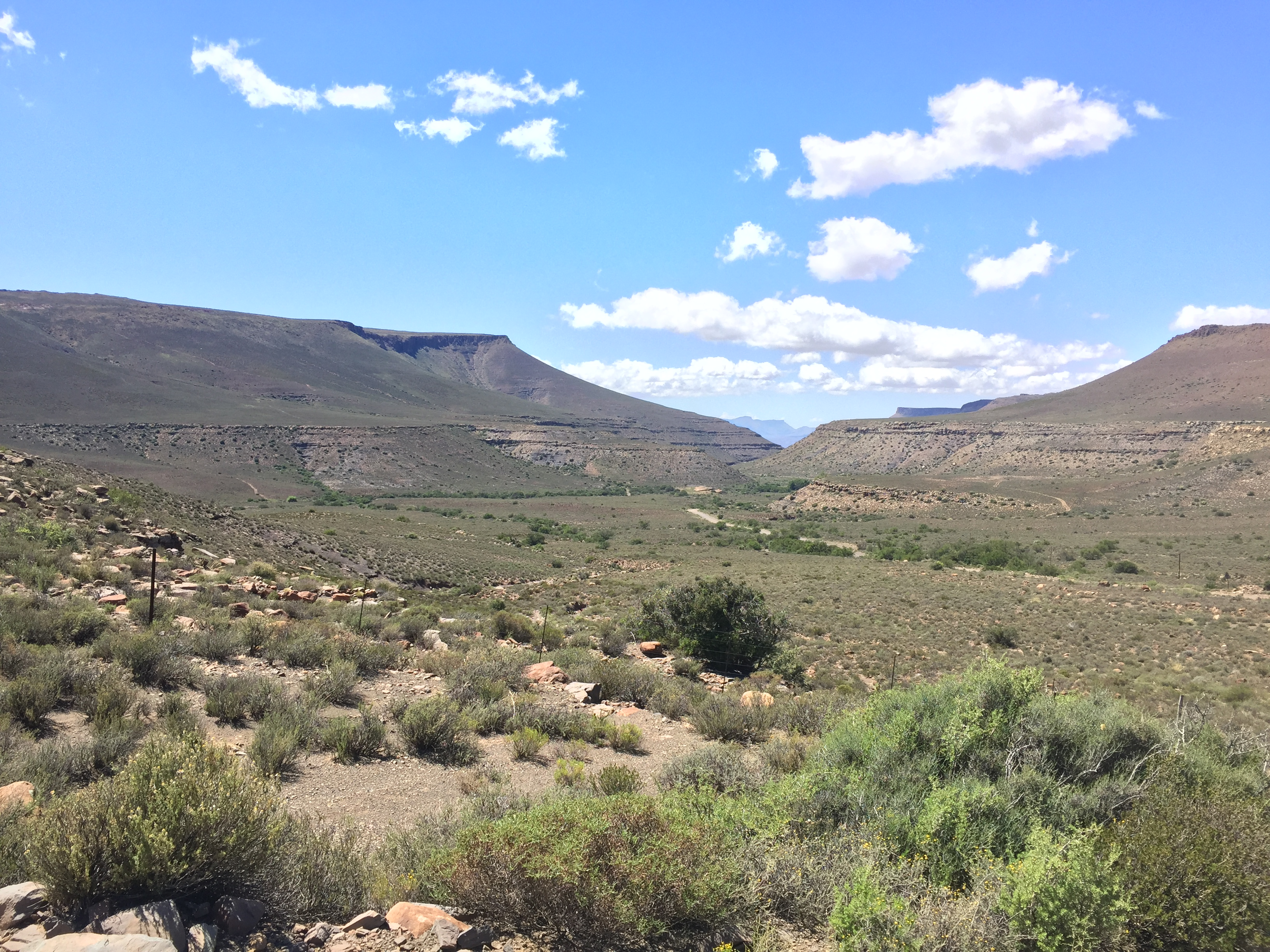
View of a basin formed by the Steenkampsberg

The Steenkampsberg is a mountain range situated south of Fraserburg in the Northern Cape, South Africa. It was named for Willem Steenkamp, an early settler in the area. The mountain constitutes a section of the central Nuweveldberge in the Great Escarpment. Its highest point is Salpeterkop (not identical with Salpeterkop near Sutherland), which reaches 1,852 metres, and overlooks the Teekloof Pass. Salpeterkop is composed of prominently inclined sheets of dolerite. The Steenkampsberg and Klipkraal-se-Berg enclose a basin which is drained by the Soutrivier.

== See also ==
- Steenkampsberg, Mpumalanga
- Teekloof Formation
