= Mapoch's Caves =

South African provincial heritage site in Mpumalanga

Mapoch's Caves (Erholweni KoNomtjherhelo)
- Location within South Africa
- Location: Roossenekal, Limpopo province of South Africa
- Coordinates: 25°10′32.8332″S 29°57′29.682″E

Mapoch's Caves is a provincial heritage site in Middelburg in the Mpumalanga province of South Africa.

== History of the cave ==
Some kilometres north of Stoffberg, on the upper reaches of the Steelpoort River, is Roossenekal and 6 kilometres north of Roossenekal is the area known as Mapoch’s Caves. It is a wild part of the Bothasberg Mountain slopes.

At the middle of the nineteenth century the area round Roossenekal was occupied by a branch of the AmaNdebele ruled by Chief Mapoch and known as the Mapoch tribe. In 1863 the Zuid-Afrjkaansche Republiek (ZAR) sent a punitive commando against them but the expedition had little success because of the broken terrain and the strong defences of the Mapoch people.

Mapoch was succeeded by his son Nyabela who took refuge in the Mapoch’s Caves and established his headquarters in that inaccessible maze of rocks and kloofs which is still called the 'Hoofstat'. The ordinary kraals lay to the left of this stronghold and a pointed koppie called Spitskoppie to the south served as a kind of advanced fortification.

In 1879 Sekhukhune, the Chief of a neighbouring Bapedi tribe, revolted against the British authority which then governed the Transvaal. He was defeated and taken prisoner, and his half-brother, Mampuru, was appointed to the chieftainship in his place. When the Zuid-Afrikaansche Republiek had regained its independence, Paul Kruger set Sekhukhune free and reinstated him as Chief of the Bapedi; but he was murdered by his half-brother, Mampuru, who then took refuge with Nyabela in the Mapoch’s Caves.

Relations between the Republic and the Mapoch people were already strained because Nyabela refused to pay double taxes to both the British and the Republican authorities and to have his territory defined. When, in addition, he refused to hand over the murderer, Mampuru, war became inevitable. The Republican Government entered the war with great reluctance because it was in dire financial straits, the battlefield was the most difficult terrain in the Transvaal and the enemy were armed with guns.

In November, 1882, Commandant-General Piet Joubert, with a commando of about 1 500 men, advanced against Nyabela. A detachment penetrated to the hills east of the 'Hoofstat' where its commander, Commandant Senekal, was killed in an attempt to blow up some of the caverns with dynamite. The Mapoch stronghold was gradually surrounded; earth forts were constructed round it as far as possible and the circumference of the encirclement was reduced step by step by building forts successively nearer to the stronghold. These were highly dangerous tactics and resulted in the death, amongst others, of Stephanus Roos, a man who had shown remarkable heroism at Majuba.

It became clear to Piet Joubert that he would only be able to capture the stronghold by besieging it and starving out the defenders. The crops of the Mapoch people were destroyed. Constant efforts were also made to take Spitskoppie which had been fortified from top to bottom; the Boers eventually succeeded in this by approaching under cover of an armoured wagon.

After the war had lasted for ten months, during which Senekal, Roos and 23 other burghers were killed, Nyabela surrendered and delivered up Mampuru. Both Nyabela and Mampuru were tried in the Supreme Court in Pretoria and sentenced to death by Judge Kotze. Mampuru was executed but Paul Kruger remitted Nyabela’s sentence to one of life imprisonment. Nyabela eventually died in prison in Pretoria.

== Proclamation as provincial heritage site ==
In 1968 it was described in the Government Gazette as

Apart from their interesting and dramatic history, the Hoofstat and Spitskoppie contain extensive stone walling of great importance to scientists interested in studying Bantu building techniques and particularly Ndebele building methods. The walling shows considerable variation, but two main kinds can be recognised : domestic building and defensive works. Two main techniques of building were employed. In the first, known as cyclopean building, huge natural boulders were piled upon one another without the use of mortar; this technique was used mainly for retaining walls of hut platforms against the steep hillside and for ramparts in front of the entrance to the caves. The other technique had much in common with other Bantu settlements in the Northern Transvaal: walls were built of smaller flat stones trimmed square and bonded with mortar. This technique was used for the most part for building huts and kraals... The said area contains valuable ethnological relics and also featured prominently in the war against Niabel in 1882-1883.
