= Kwena Dam =

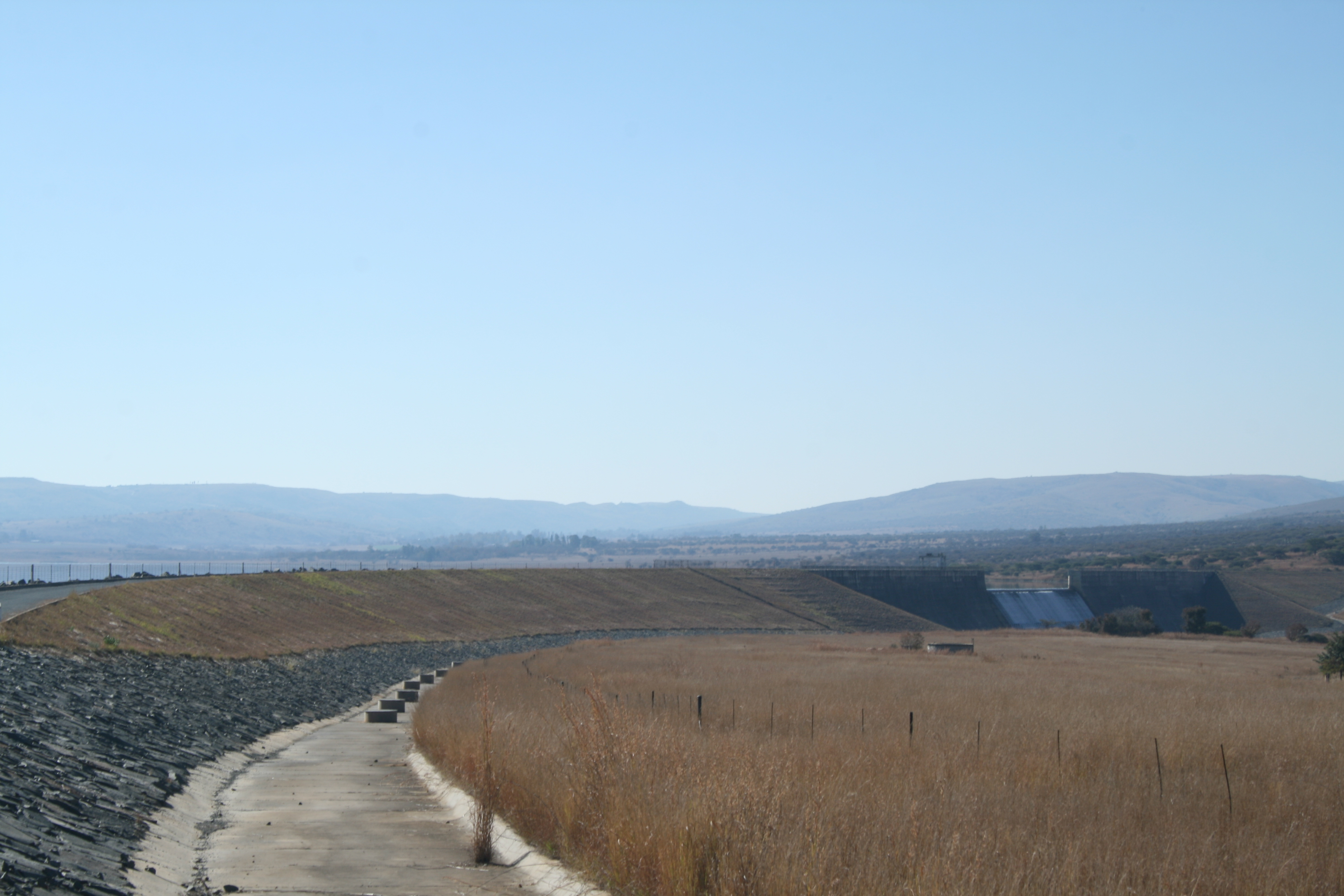
- Kwena Dam wall

- Location within South Africa
- Official name: Kwena Dam
- Country: South Africa
- Location: Lydenburg, Mpumalanga
- Coordinates: 25°21′45″S 30°22′30″E
- Purpose: Drinking water and irrigation
- Opening date: 1984
- Owner: Department of Water Affairs

Dam and spillways
- Type of dam: Arch-gravity dam
- Impounds: Crocodile River
- Height: 50 metres (160 ft)
- Length: 1,783 metres (5,850 ft)

Reservoir
- Creates: Kwena Dam Reservoir
- Total capacity: 160,800 megalitre
- Catchment area: 954 km^{2}
- Surface area: 12.504 hectares (30.90 acres)

Kwena Dam is a combined gravity and arch type dam located on the Crocodile River, near Lydenburg, Mpumalanga, South Africa. It was established in 1984 and it serves mainly for irrigation purposes. The hazard potential of the dam has been ranked high.

== See also ==
- List of reservoirs and dams in South Africa
