= Battle of Bergendal =

1900 battle of the Second Boer War

- Part of the Second Boer War
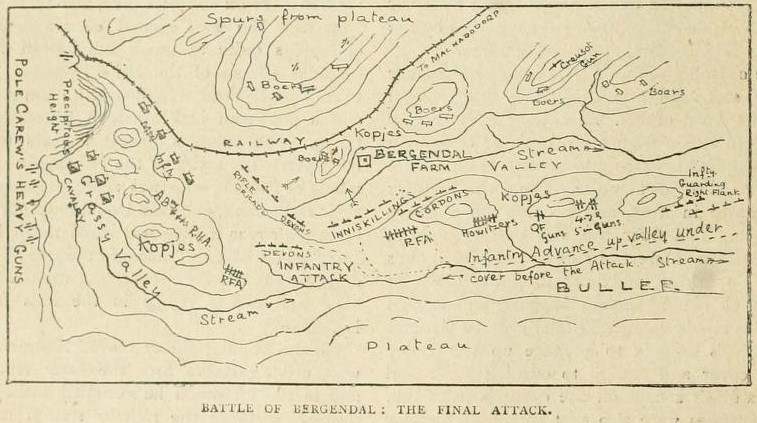
- Map of the battle of Bergendal: The final attack (Battles of the nineteenth century, 1901)
Date	21–27 August 1900
Location	Belfast, South Africa 25°44′4″S 30°5′36″E
Result	British victory

Belligerents
United Kingdom: Australia	South African Republic

Commanders and leaders
Lord Roberts; Redvers Buller	Louis Botha

Strength
19,000 men, 82 guns	7,000 men, 20 guns

Casualties and losses
385	78

The Battle of Berg-en-dal (also known as the Battle of Belfast or Battle of Dalmanutha) took place in South Africa during the Second Anglo-Boer War.

The battle was the last set-piece battle of the war, although the war was still to last another two years. It was also the last time that the Boers' four 155 mm Creusot Long Tom guns were used in the same battle.

== Before ==
Hostilities commenced in October 1899. On the Cape front the British forces broke through in February 1900 and the next month they were in Bloemfontein, the capital of the Orange Free State. Pretoria, the capital of the Zuid-Afrikaansche Republiek (ZAR) was captured in June 1900. The government of the ZAR and a few Boer commandos fled eastwards along the railway line to Lourenço Marques (now Maputo). They were pursued by General Pole-Carew and his 11th Infantry Division (7,500 officers and men) and a cavalry division commanded by Lieutenant-General French.

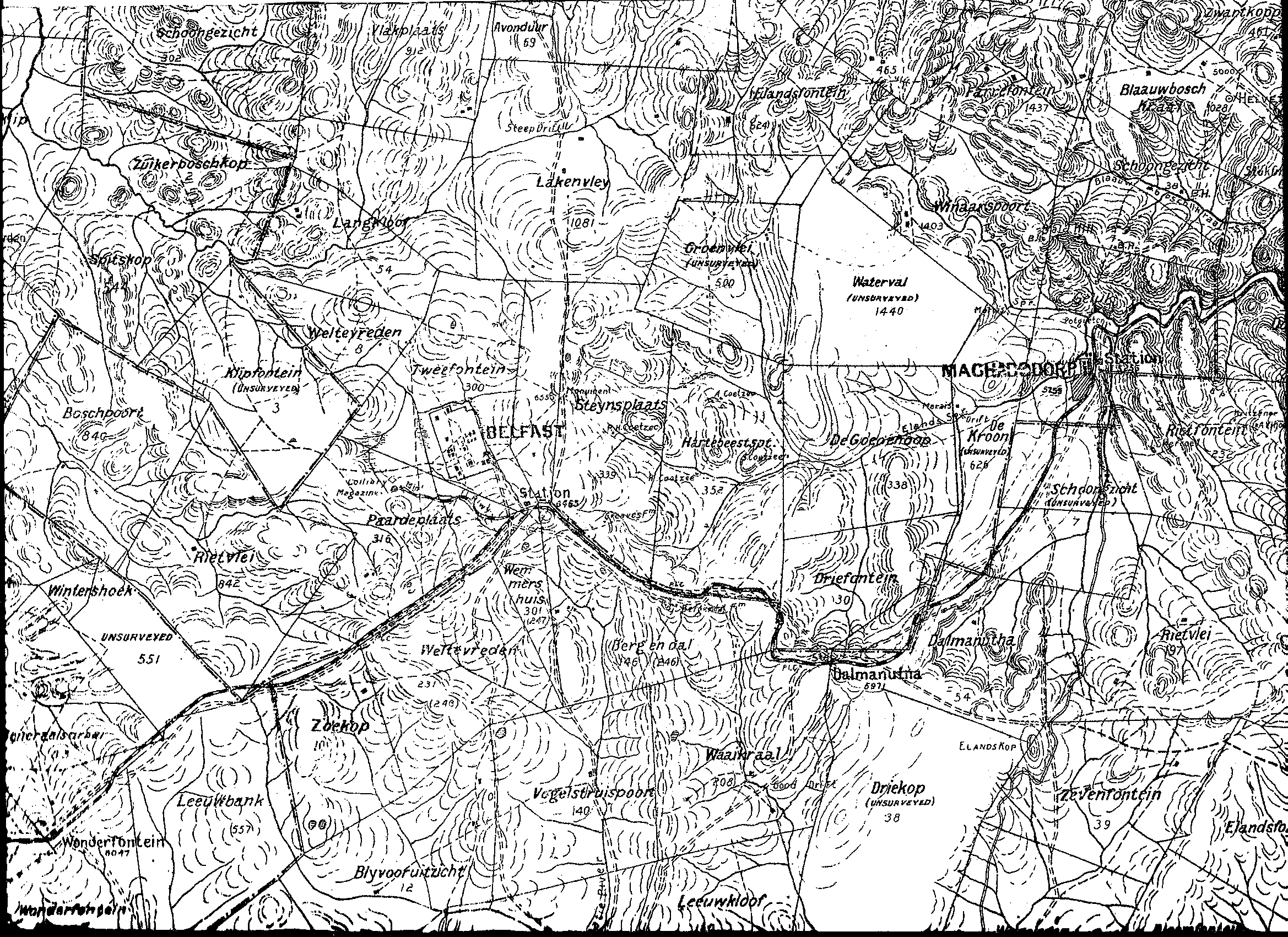
Major Jackson map showing the farms on which the Boers were deployed

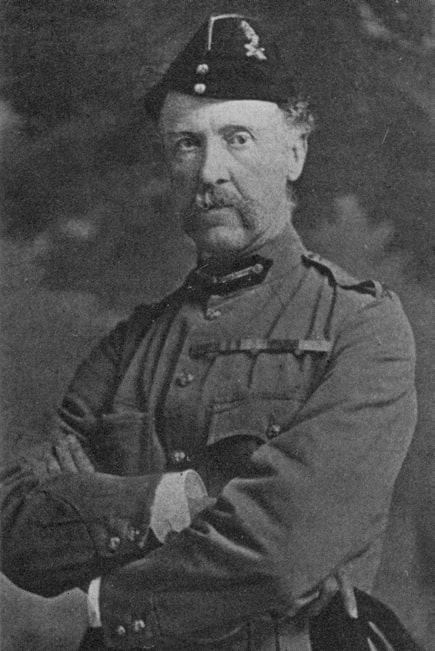
Lt.-genl. N. G. Lyttelton.

Prior to the Battle of Diamond Hill on 11 June 1900, General Botha sent a few officers ahead to Belfast to select and prepare ramparts and emplacements for the next battle. The terrain at Belfast was such that it was the only place where the Boers could present a wide enough front to resist the enemy's superior force. The Boer forces were deployed as follows: North of the railway line, in a semi-circle around the town of Belfast, the Lydenburg commando was to be found on the farms Spitskop, Zuikerboschkop and Langkloof. A Long Tom was placed on the farm Spitskop. These burghers' task was to prevent the English from taking the back road to Dullstroom.

The commandos from Middelburg and Johannesburg were on the farm Steynsplaats, just east of the main road to Dullstroom. Their task was to enfilade the enemy with cross-fire, should they decide to take the main road to Dullstroom and Lydenburg. Another Long Tom was placed behind these commandos on the farm Waterval. Still on the northern side of the railway line, but close to it, was the Krugersdorp commando. Next to them, but on the southern side of the railway line was a detachment of the Zuid-Afrikaansche Rijdende Politie (ZARPs), who were to bear the brunt of the British attack. The burghers from Germiston were next to them.

South of the railway line the upper reaches of the Komati River flow from north to south giving rise to a number of hills and dales. One such hill formed a large plateau and was called Gelukplato, because it was on the farm Geluk. The rest of Botha's force was ensconced on this plateau. The Heidelberg commando was on the farm Geluk, while the Bethal commando built their sconces on the farm Frischgewaagd, They were supported by the third Long Tom on Driekop. The fourth Long Tom was initially mounted on a railway truck. After 6 August, when Sir Redvers Buller started to advance towards Belfast, this gun was moved to position close to Elandskop. From there they could bomb Groblers Bridge, should Buller decide to advance via there to Machadodorp.

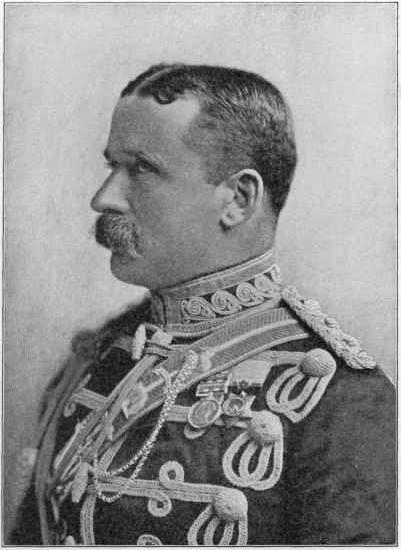
Colonel French in full dress uniform, 1892

Pole-Carew reached Middelburg in July 1900 and started assembling the XIth Infantry Division. French and his cavalry advanced to Wonderfontein. On the Natal front General Sir Redvers Buller broke through in February 1900, but was then stopped. It was only on 6 August 1900 that he could start his advance towards Belfast. His task force consisted of the 4th Infantry Division commanded by Lieutenant-General N.G. Lyttelton, with Brigadier-General F.W. Kitchener of the 7th Brigade and Major-General Howard of the 8th Brigade. Buller's mounted troops consisted of the 2nd Cavalry Brigade, commanded by Major-General J.F. Brocklehurst and 3 Mounted Infantry Brigade under Earl Dundonald. Buller's force consisted of 9,000 officers and men with 42 guns. Buller reached the farm Twyfelaar on the Komati River on 15 August. There he got in touch with French's right flank. This enabled Buller to be supplied from Wonderfontein.

== Battle ==
=== 21 August ===
General Buller advanced to the farm Van Wyk's Vley, about eight miles (13 km) north of Twyfelaar. General French remained on his left flank. While advancing the last three miles, Buller's right flank came under fire from the Bethal commando on Frischgewaagd. A fight ensued and it lasted until early evening. British casualties were 36 (including 7 dead and 3 missing) and 3 Boers were wounded.

=== 22 August ===
Buller was peeved. He sent Major-general Walter Kitchener to teach the Bethal commando a lesson. Two battalions foot soldiers, four squadrons mounted troops and eight guns accompanied Kitchener. The Brits did not know that during the night the Carolina commando joined the burghers from Bethal. They fought all day. British casualties were two dead and five wounded. No casualties were reported on the other side.

=== 23 August ===
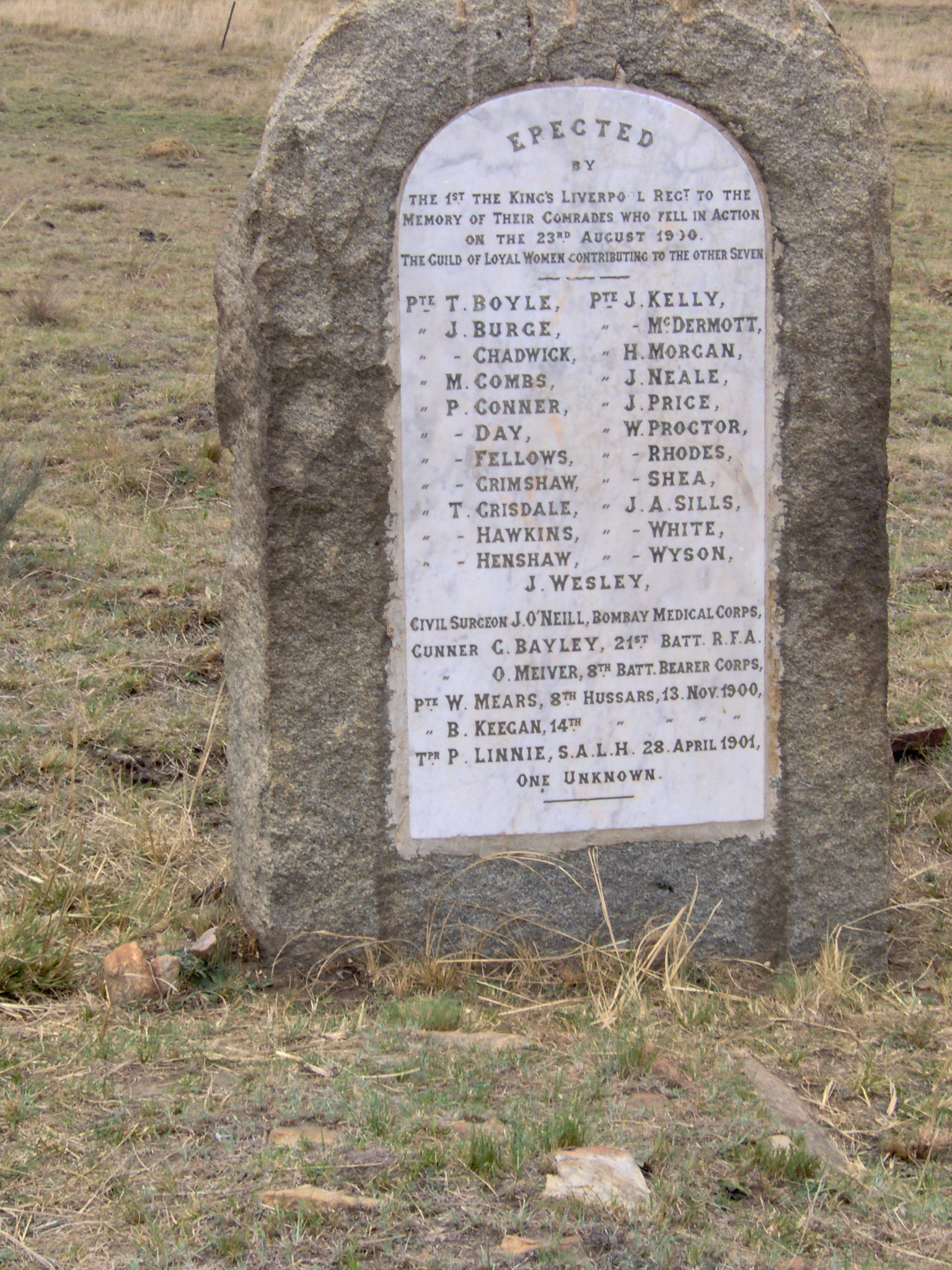
Gravestone of Liverpools on Geluk

During Buller's advance, at a time when it was unclear to the Boers whether he was going to Machadodorp or Belfast, they removed the Long Tom from the railway truck and placed it near Elandskop. The remains of the emplacements was found at 25°46.214'S, 30°12.829'E (WGS84). When Buller advanced from Twyfelaar to Van Wyk's Vley, it was clear that he was aiming at Belfast. The Boers then moved the gun to Captain von Dalwig's camp on the farm Waaikraal. The remains of the emplacement can be found at 25°46.225'S, 30°09.079'E(WGS84).

Pole-Carew and his infantry division left Middelburg and advanced to Wonderfontein. Buller, with French still on his left flank, advanced to the farm Geluk and established his headquarters in the valley near the farm house. On his eastern side was the Geluk Plateau on which the Heidelberg commando had built their sconces. He ordered the 8th Infantry Brigade, assisted by Dundonald's mounted troops and the South African Light Horse, to ascend the plateau and make it safe. On the plateau they had to face the commandos from Heidelberg and Bethal, as well as Von Dalwig's guns, including two Long Toms. Despite heavy losses, they managed to hold the edge of the plateau. British casualties were 12 dead, 61 wounded and 33 missing. The Boers had 12 wounded, including Captain von Dalwig.

=== 24 August ===
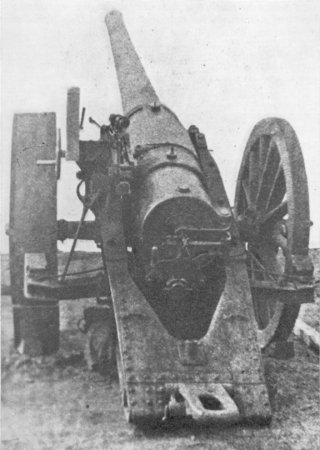
4.7 inch QF naval field gun on howitzer carriage

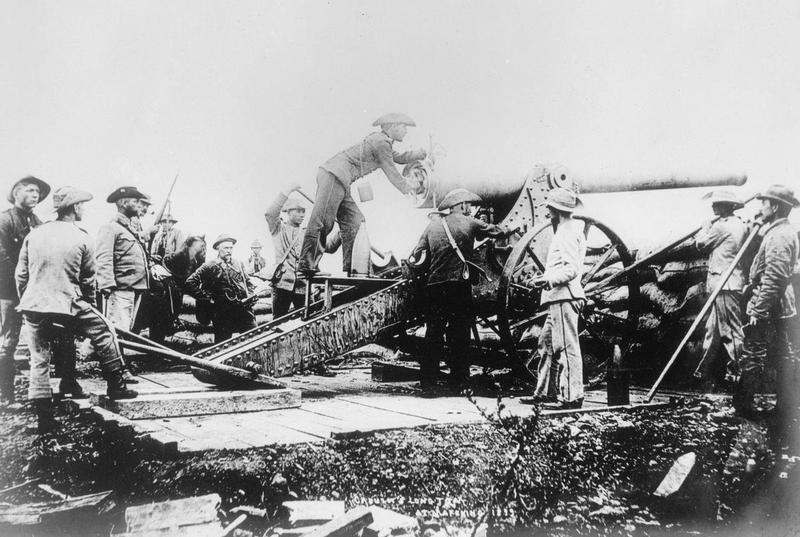
Boer general Piet Cronjé's 94-pounder Creusot 'Long Tom' gun fires at British forces during the siege of Mafeking which lasted from October 1899 to May 1900.

During the night of 23 August Buller's men on the western edge of the Geluk plateau dug in and made emplacements for four naval guns (two 5" and two 4.7"). The next day they exchanged fire with the Boers' two Long Toms (on Driekop and Von Dalwig's camp). The Long Toms caused six casualties in the Natal Field Force.

Pole-Carew's left Wonderfontein and occupied Belfast. British casualties were 18. During the night of 24/5 August his men placed two 5" guns just south of the railway line and two 4.7" pieces near the Belfast station.

=== 25 August ===
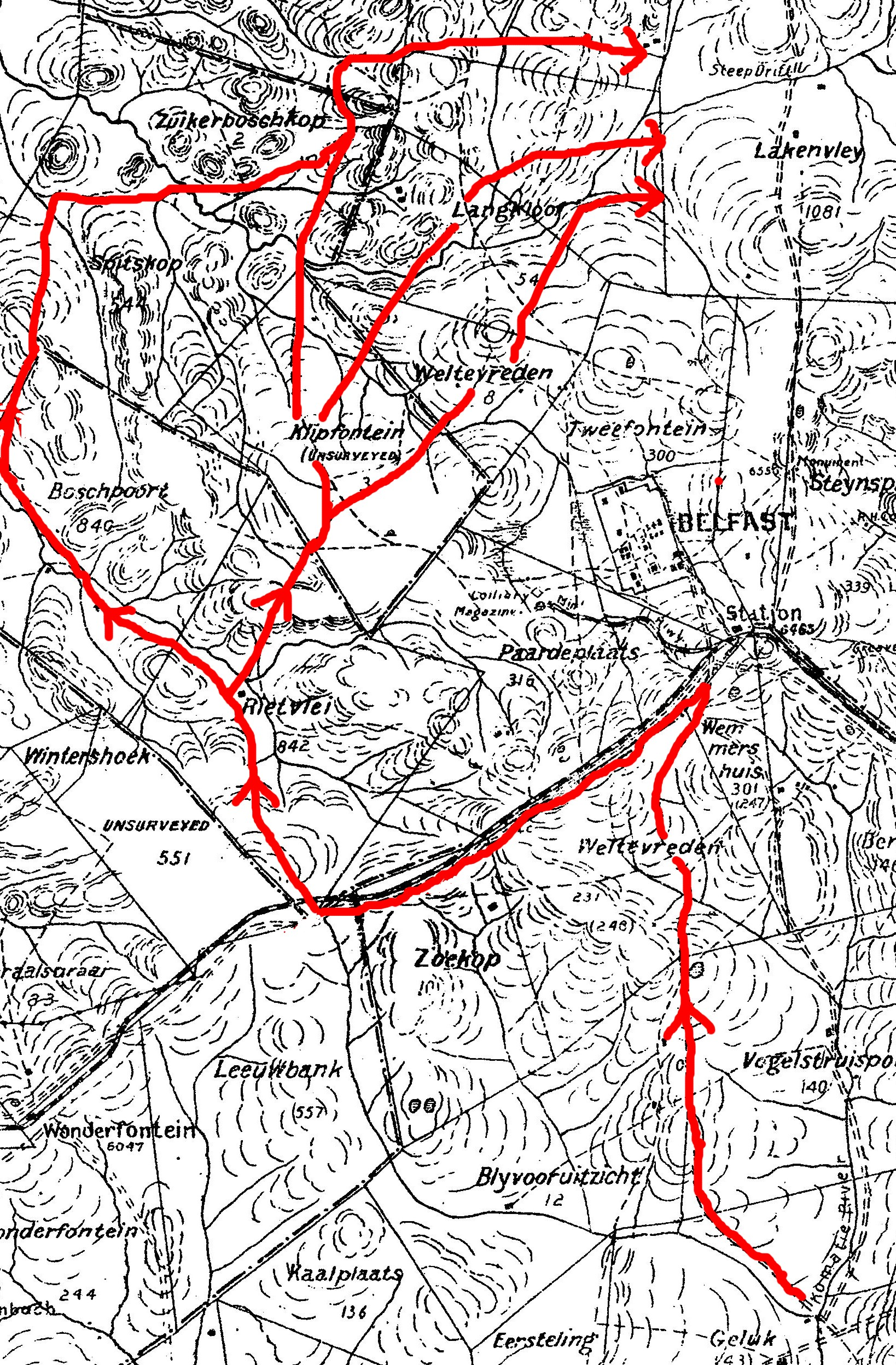
French's left swipe

On 25 August Lord Roberts arrived in Belfast to take charge of operations. He had a conference with his generals, Pole-Carew, Buller and French. French was ordered to get rid of the Boers on their right flank on Zuikerboschkop and then swerve right to Machadodorp. Buller was ordered to turn right and advance over Dalmanutha to Machadodorp. Pole-Carew had to extend his force northwards along the main road to Dullstroom to join French at Lakenvley.

Fighting on this day was limited to the exchange of fire of the heavy guns. Maurice and Grant record: "Moreover, the enemy had by no means the better of the exchanges with the heavy guns of both divisions, one of the 6-inch Creusots near Bergendal being reduced to silence by a 5-inch shell from Pole-Carew's position".

=== 26 August ===
General French and his cavalry left Geluk very early and first called at Belfast. They left there at 09:00 and first proceeded west along the railway line, possibly to mislead Boer spies. When they were out of sight they swung right and unexpectedly appeared on the farm Boschpoort. The Boers and their Long Tom beat a hasty retreat, while French cleared the rest of the burghers from Zuikerboschkop and Langkloof. By 14:00 he could send a message to Pole-Carew that they could commence their march northwards. The Infantry Division experienced some cross-fire from the east and the Long Tom on Waterval fired a few shots as well. The result of the march was that Pole-Carew was in command of all the high-lying ground between the railway line and Lakenvley. Most of the Middelburg commando had simply fled.

Buller advanced northwards as well. His plan was to swing right on the farm Vogelstruispoort and then proceed over Waaikraal to Dalmanutha. But that afternoon his scouts reported (a bit erroneously) that the Boers' right flank ended at the railway line. He therefore decided to make his breakthrough on the farm Bergendal the next day.

=== 27 August ===
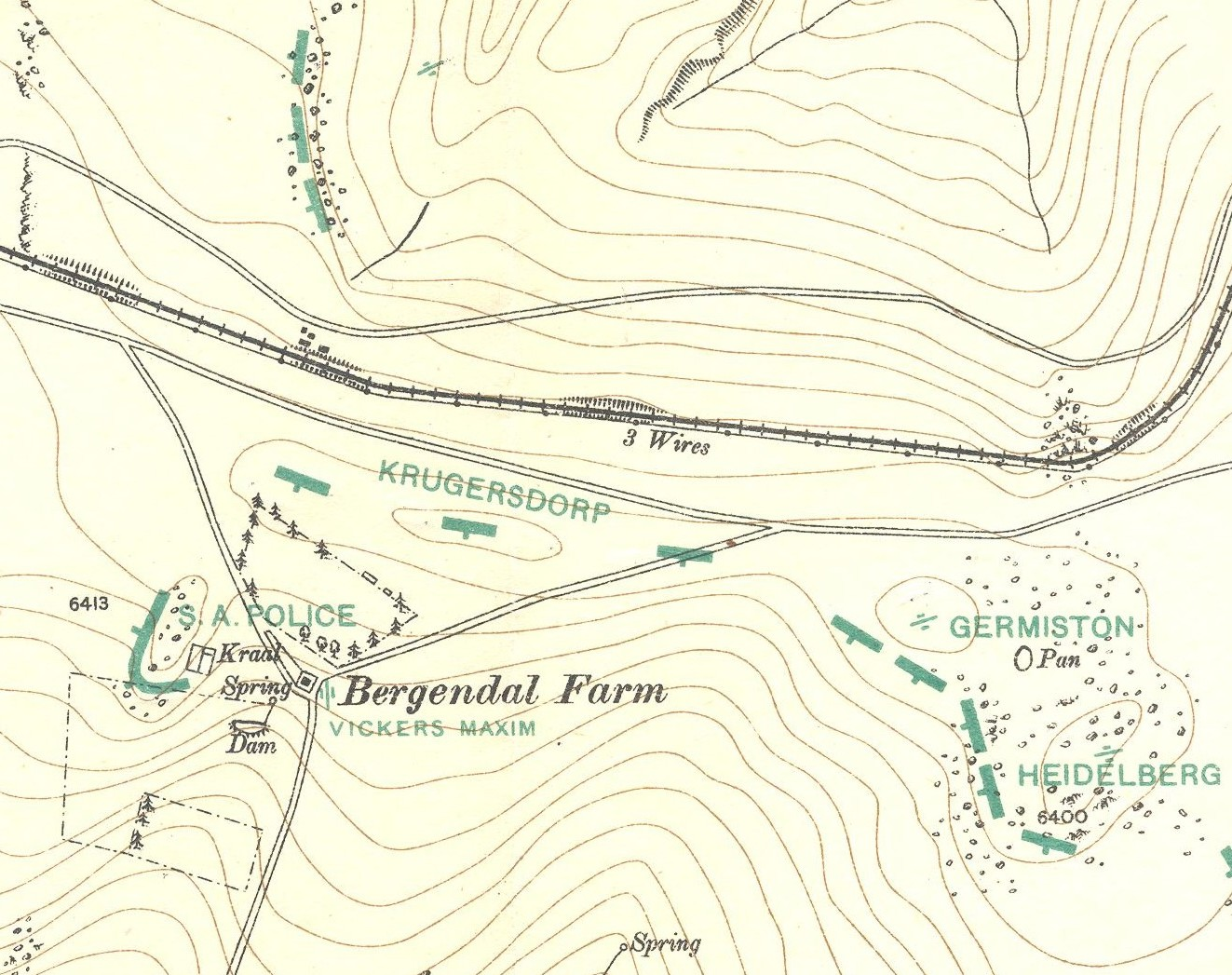
Map of Maurice & Grant showing protuberance

Buller himself went scouting early that morning. The Boers' right flank did not actually end at the railway line, but it did swing sharply clockwise. It thus formed a salient angle. The result was that their position on the farm Bergendal (occupied by the ZARPs) stuck out like the tip of one's nose or a protuberance. On both sides of this position the Boers' sangars were facing away from the tip, with the result that those occupying them could not assist those on the tip in the case of a frontal attack. Then there was some high ground some 3,000 yards south-west of the salient angle and that was an ideal place for the artillery he wanted to use.

About 36 guns were placed on the high ground and the bombardment of the ZARPs position started at 11:00. After three hours the Rifle Brigade and the Inniskilling Fusiliers charged and burst right through the Boer lines. When the fighting stopped they found that the position had been defended by the Zuid-Afrikaanse Republiek Politie (a police force). The British found 14 dead bodies and captured nineteen prisoners. The rest of the wounded were taken away by the Boers and some even survived. British casualties for the day were: officers, 3 dead and 7 wounded; men, 100 wounded or missing and 12 dead.

The Battle of Bergendal was over. British casualties were 385 and the Boers' were 78.

== Aftermath ==
As a result of this defeat, the Boer line of defence was breached and on 28 August Buller's troops marched into Machadodorp. The ZAR government, meanwhile, had decamped to Nelspruit. A few days later, on 1 September, Lord Roberts proclaimed the entire South African Republic British territory.

However, the capture of Machadodorp and Roberts' proclamation did not end the war. Although the British had won the battle, Botha's main force had managed to stay intact. The Boer commandos subsequently dispersed to Lydenburg and Barberton and the next phase of the war—guerrilla warfare—started. This second phase would last even longer than the first, conventional, phase and peace would eventually only be declared at the end of May 1902.

== War Memorial ==
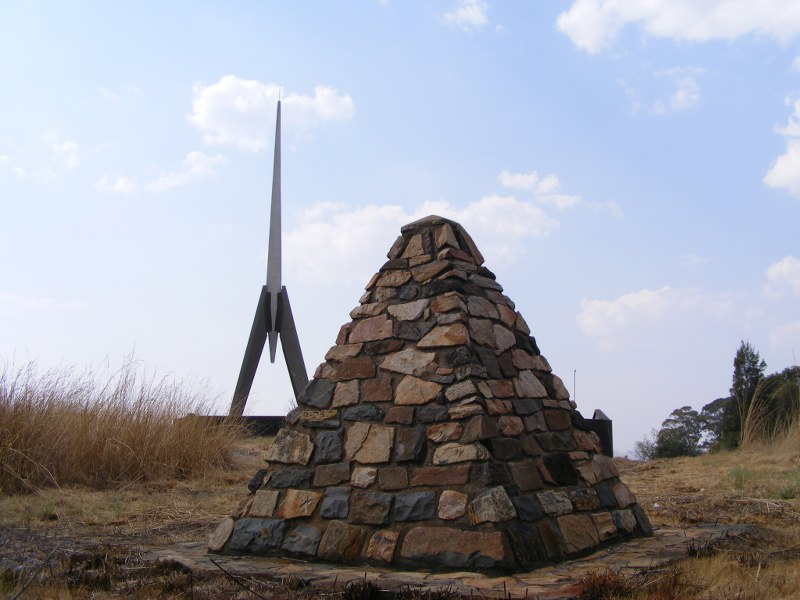
Two memorials, large pylon for Boers, small stone pyramid for British, on Berg-en-dal

A memorial was erected in 1935 in memory of the twelve Zarps who died in the Battle of Berg-en-dal on 27 Augustus 1900. A much larger second memorial, in honour of all Boers, including the Zarps, who had died in the Eastern Transvaal, was unveiled on 29 August 1970 and a small stone cairn was erected in memory of the 25 officers and men of the 2nd Battalion the Rifle Brigade who died in the battle.
