= Steenkampsberg, Mpumalanga =

Steenkampsberg
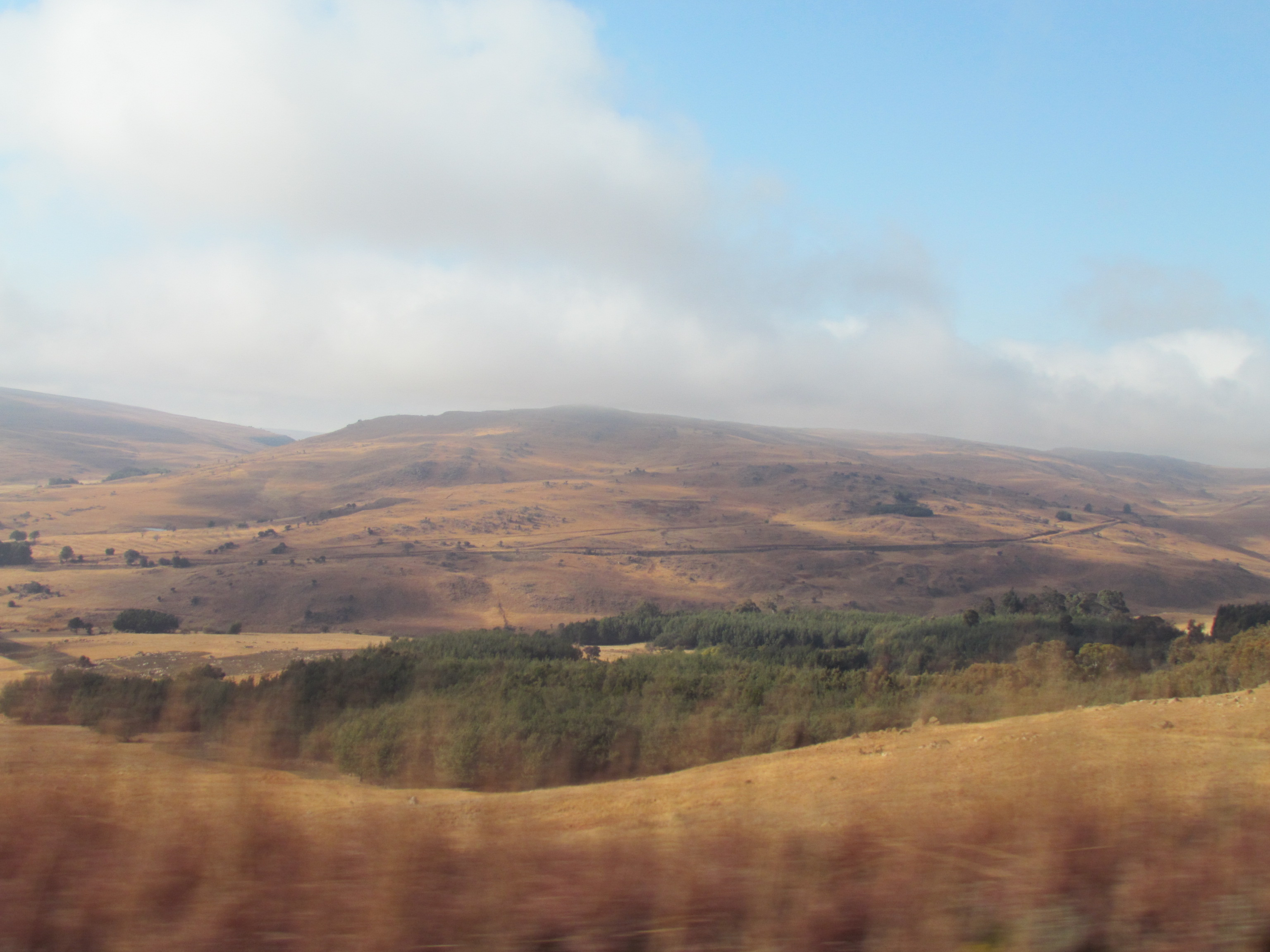

Highest point
- Peak: Die Berg
- Elevation: 2,332 m (7,651 ft)
- Coordinates: 25°12′34″S 30°9′55″E

Dimensions
- Length: 170 km (110 mi) NE/SW
- Width: 80 km (50 mi) NW/SE

Geography
- Location within South Africa
- Location: near Lydenburg
- Country: South Africa
- Province: Mpumalanga

Geology
- Orogeny: Kaapvaal craton
- Rock age: Neoarchean to early Paleoproterozoic
- Rock type(s): Bushveld igneous complex, sandstone

Climbing
- Easiest route: From the towns of Dullstroom or Belfast

Steenkampsberg (Afrikaans: Steenkampsberge) is a South African mountain in the Dullstroom - Belfast district of Mpumalanga Province. The mountain ranges between 1,700 and 2,274 metres in altitude, and is covered largely by high-altitude grassland, broken in places by rocky outcrops. The northern slope of the mountain is drained by the Groot-Dwarsrivier, which enters a deep linear valley, to eventually join the Steelpoort River. The mountain is traversed from west to east by the R577 road (De Berg Pass).

== Ecology ==
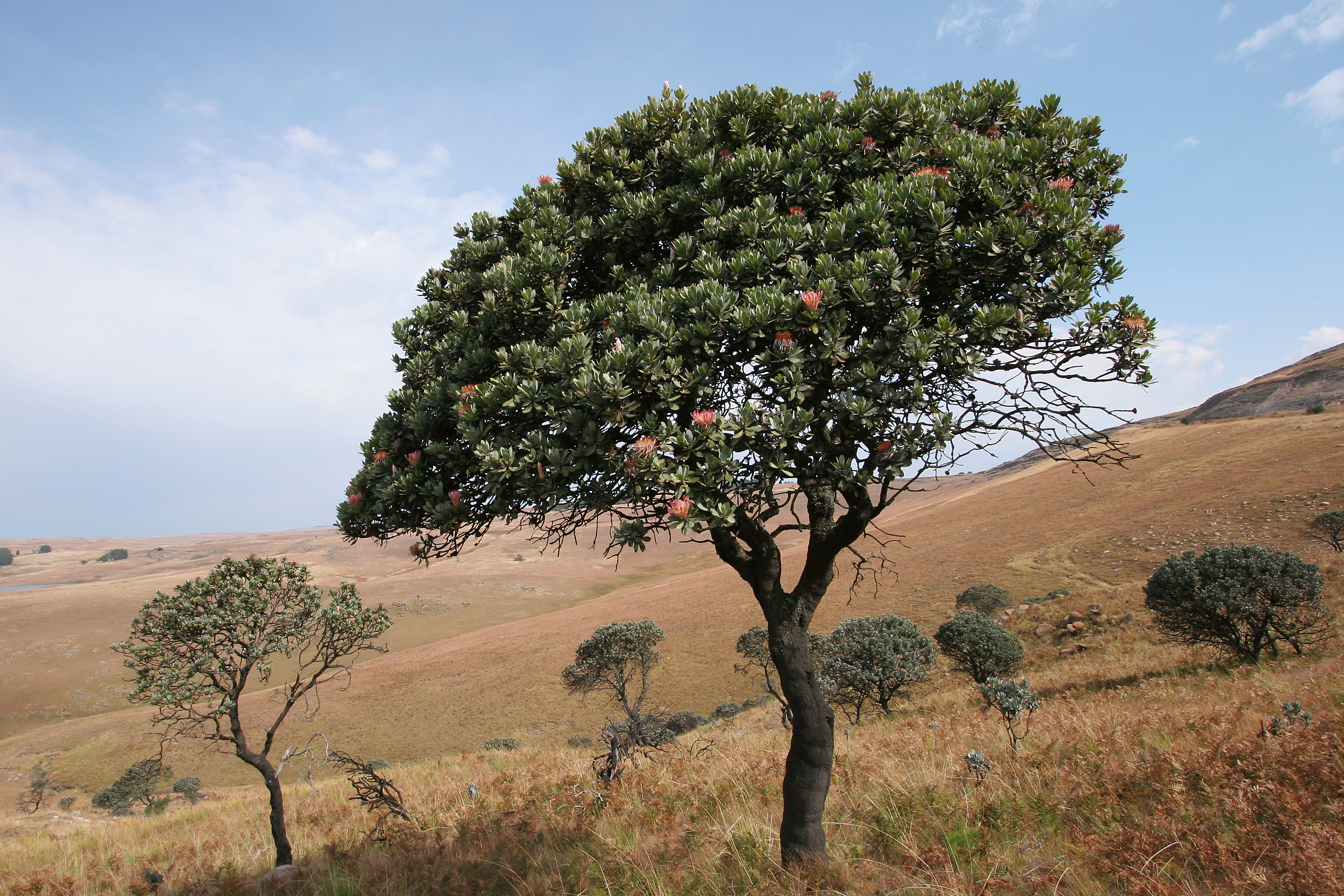
The nominate subspecies of Protea roupelliae on the slopes of the mountain

The mountain plateau retains extensive tracts of unspoilt habitat, supporting a large diversity of mammals, birds and plant life. The common tree fern Cyathea dregei occurs along watercourses and streams, while overgrazed mountain slopes and eroded ravines are often dominated by Leucosidea sericea shrubs.

The area is home to more than 150 bird species, a fair number being endemic to South Africa. The wetlands of the region shelter all of the three endangered South African species of crane - blue, crowned, and wattled. Two of the wetlands, Lakenvlei, 8 km north-east of Belfast, and Verloren Valei, 9 km north of Dullstroom, are of particular importance for the survival of these species.

Waterbirds, such as heron, rail, crake, Egyptian goose, spur-winged goose, kingfisher, coot, sacred ibis and whiskered tern, make up a large proportion of the birdlife. Open grassland species include lark, pipit, cisticola, finch, bustard, bald ibis and francolin. Raptors in the area include steppe and jackal buzzard, snake eagle, long-crested eagle, fish eagle and secretary bird.

Mammals include a few antelope species such as the oribi, grey duiker, mountain reedbuck, grey rhebuck and steenbok. Also occurring are serval, civet, Southern African wildcat and caracal. Black-backed jackal, brown hyena, aardwolf, porcupine, bushpig and aardvark are nocturnal and rarely seen. Both otter species, the Cape clawless otter, and the smaller spotted-necked otter are to be found throughout the plateau. Their diet includes the introduced rainbow trout and accordingly they are regularly poisoned, trapped or hunted by trout fly-fishing resorts and trout hatcheries who feel their livelihood threatened.

Rainbow trout have had a seriously detrimental impact on native fish species in the headwaters of streams draining the Steenkampsberg.

== Land management ==
The area is covered by some 150 privately owned farms.

== See also ==
- Steenkampsberg, Northern Cape
- List of mountain ranges of South Africa
