= Dullstroom =

Dullstroom Dullstroom Emnothweni
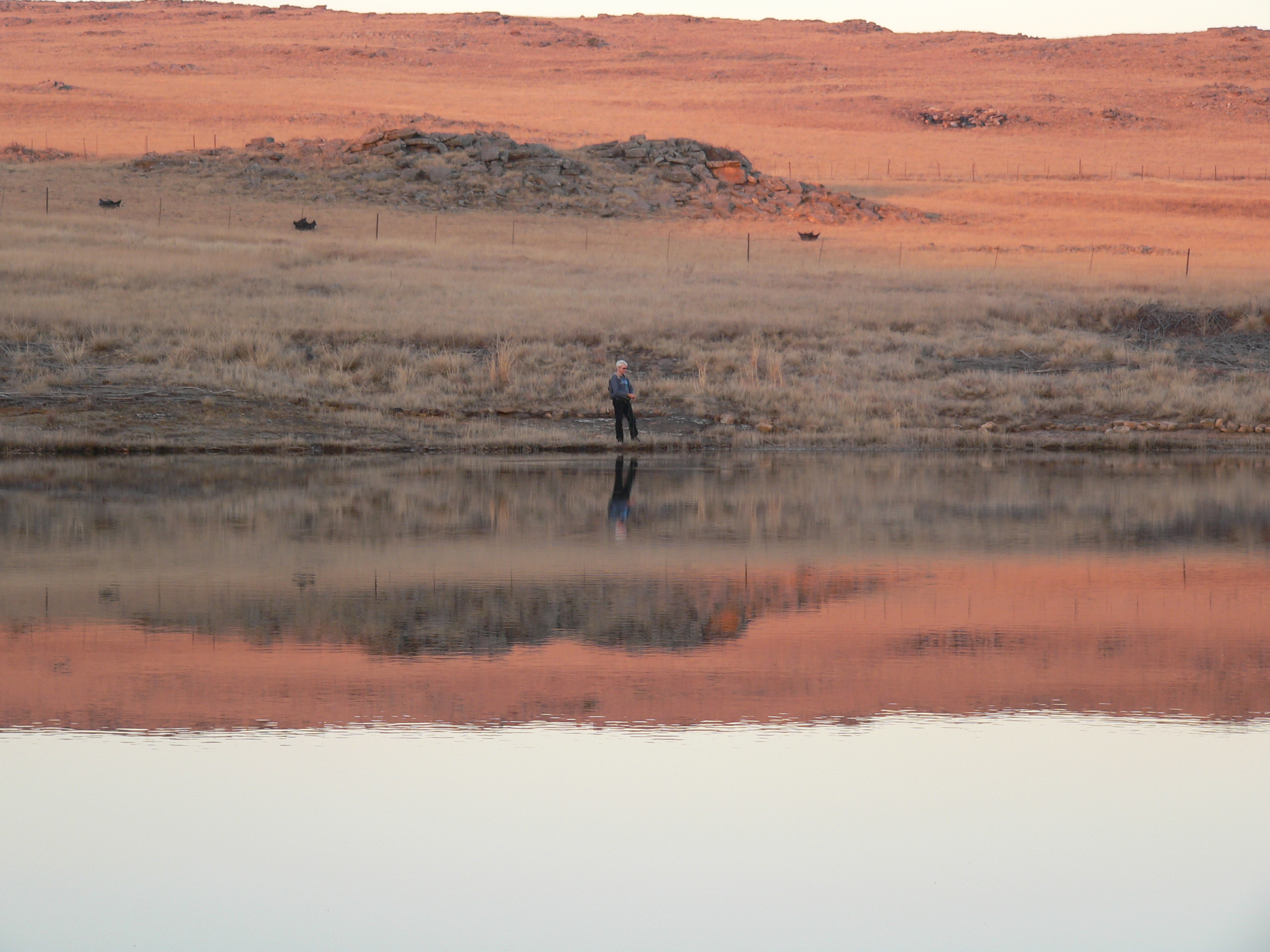
- Fly-fishing at the Dullstroom dam and nature reserve
- Nickname: Dullies
- Location within Mpumalanga Location within South Africa
- Coordinates: 25°25′S 30°7′E
- Country: South Africa
- Province: Mpumalanga
- District: Nkangala
- Municipality: Emakhazeni
- Established: 1883

Area
  - Total: 30.40 km^{2} (11.74 sq mi)
- Elevation: 2,100 m (6,900 ft)

Population (2011)
  - Total: 558
  - Density: 18.4/km^{2} (47.5/sq mi)

Racial makeup (2011)
  - Black African: 8.1%
  - Indian/Asian: 7.3%
  - White: 84.2%
  - Other: 0.4%

First languages (2011)
  - English: 50.7%
  - Afrikaans: 42.1%
  - S. Ndebele: 2.0%
  - Sotho: 2.0%
  - Other: 3.2%
- Time zone: UTC+2 (SAST)
- Postal code (street): 1110
- PO box: 1110
- Area code: 013
- Website: Dullstroom

Dullstroom, also known as Emnothweni, is a small town in Mpumalanga province, South Africa. The town lies 35 kilometres (22 miles) north of Belfast and some 53 kilometres (33 miles) south-west of Lydenburg on the R540 road.

Along with Barkly East and Underberg, it is one of South Africa's premier flyfishing destinations. The town features the highest railway station in South Africa at 2,077 metres (6,814 feet) above sea level as well as at the foot of De Berg, the highest point in the province at 2,332 metres (7,651 feet). Dullstroom's location on the Highveld plateau is the reason that its climate is so different from the surrounding areas.

== History ==
The area was occupied in the mid-19th century by the Southern Ndebele people under the rule of King Mabhoko (called Mapoch by white settlers). Like his son Nyabêla, Mabhoko used Mapoch's Caves as a hideout during conflict with troops of the South African Republic (ZAR). The most violent fighting took place from 1882 to 1883. The nearby Fort Mapoch and a statue of Nyabêla are major attractions in Dullstroom.

Dullstroom was established as the work of a settlement company founded in 1883 by its namesake Dutchman Wolterus Dull, at the invitation of State President of the South African Republic Paul Kruger, to settle Dutch immigrants. Dull, a merchant from Amsterdam, chairman of a committee which rendered assistance to families who had suffered losses during the First Anglo-Boer War. The element stroom, ‘stream’, refers to the Crocodile River nearby. The company purchased the farms Groot Suikerboschkop and Elandslaagte as the nucleus of the fledgling settlement, including housing for the settlers on the former. The village was proclaimed a town by Kruger in Dull's honor on October 9, 1893.

Settlers continued to immigrate from 1884 to 1887. By 1893, the population had reached 48 people in eight houses, served by three stables, ten cattle pens, and a small trading company and store.

While many of the men joined the rebels in the Second Boer War, the women and children were held in the British concentration camp in Belfast. After the Battle of Bergendal, guerrilla fighting continued in the area for a while. During the war, the town was destroyed and most of the settlers returned to the Netherlands.

Only two buildings were left standing after the war, but some of the residents returned to rebuild the town, however. The church was rebuilt in 1905. In 1921, the first city council met. After fly fishing, originally a New England pastime, became popular with the wealthy residents of Johannesburg, properties with trout dams were purchased, which are still used today.

== Climate ==
Due to its high elevation (Dullstroom being the highest town in South Africa itself), Dullstroom has a subtropical highland climate (Köppen: Cwb). From October to April, the town sees a significant amount of rainfall (higher than nearby Johannesburg to the west), in contrast with winter, where precipitation lacks.

Its relatively cool and temperate climate has made Dullstroom the only place in South Africa where beech and elm trees grow, which were originally planted by Dutch colonists.

Climate data for Dullstroom
Month	Jan	Feb	Mar	Apr	May	Jun	Jul	Aug	Sep	Oct	Nov	Dec	Year
Mean daily maximum °C (°F)	19.0 (66.2)	18.9 (66.0)	17.2 (63.0)	16.7 (62.1)	15.8 (60.4)	12.3 (54.1)	11.6 (52.9)	9.9 (49.8)	13.7 (56.7)	15.7 (60.3)	16.3 (61.3)	17.9 (64.2)	15.4 (59.8)
Daily mean °C (°F)	14.5 (58.1)	14.2 (57.6)	12.6 (54.7)	11 (52)	9.5 (49.1)	6.6 (43.9)	5.9 (42.6)	4.4 (39.9)	9.8 (49.6)	10.5 (50.9)	11.8 (53.2)	13 (55)	10.3 (50.6)
Mean daily minimum °C (°F)	10 (50)	8.6 (47.5)	8 (46)	5.6 (42.1)	3.1 (37.6)	0.4 (32.7)	0.2 (32.4)	−1.2 (29.8)	3 (37)	5.2 (41.4)	6.6 (43.9)	9 (48)	4.9 (40.7)
Average precipitation mm (inches)	206 (8.1)	166 (6.5)	106 (4.2)	98 (3.9)	96 (3.8)	56 (2.2)	46 (1.8)	66 (2.6)	88 (3.5)	93 (3.7)	137 (5.4)	168 (6.6)	1,326 (52.3)

== Culture ==
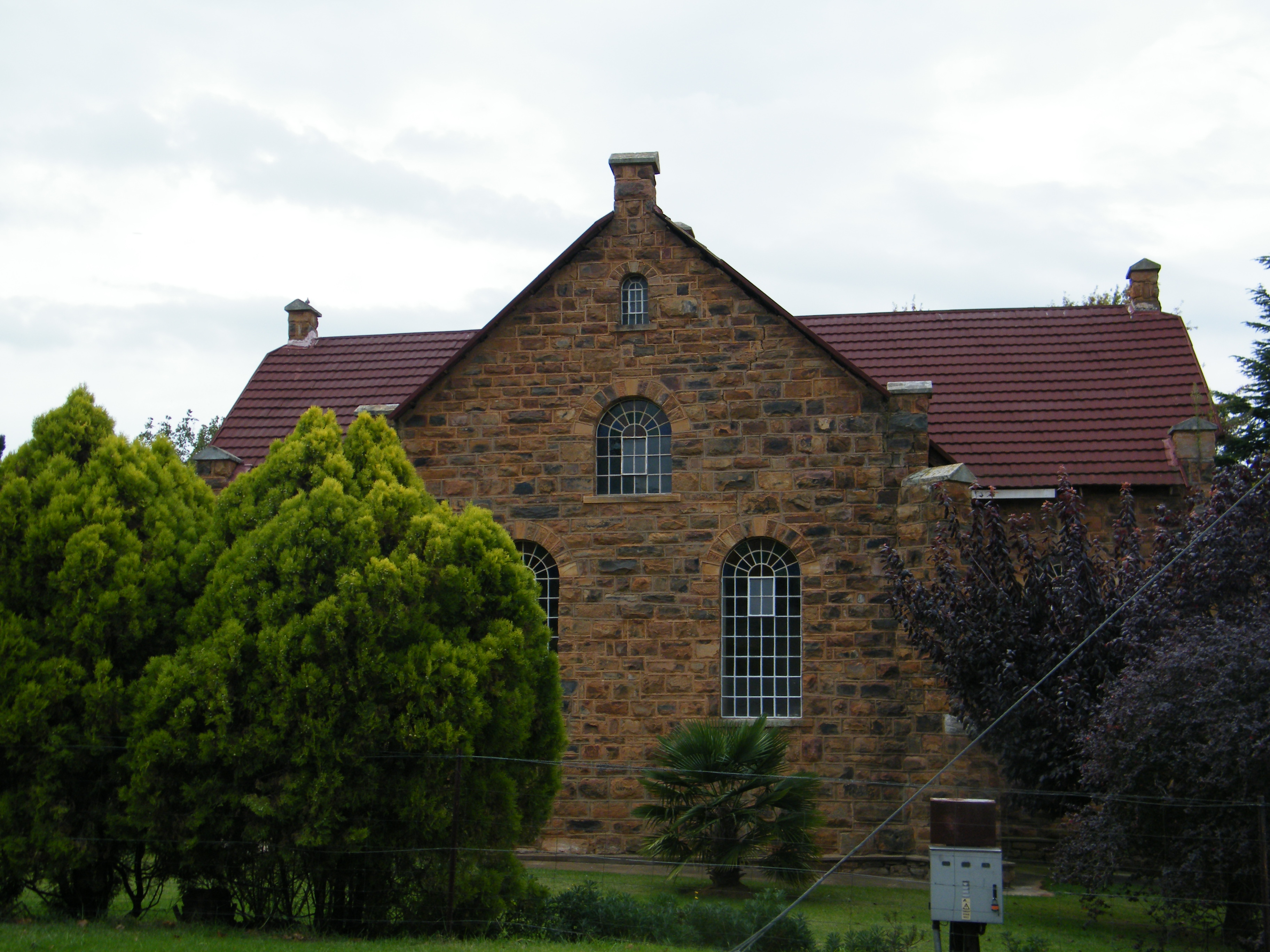
The Dullstroom "Hervormde Kerk", Afrikaans for 'Reformed Church'

Inspired by the Bavarian Oktoberfest, the annual Ducktober Beer Fest is a beer, food and music festival held in Dullstroom and is the highest beer festival in Southern Africa, at 2,100 m (6,900 ft) above sea level. The festival is organised by Proudly Dullstroom and the inaugural event was hosted at The Duck & Trout in September 2017.

The Dullstroom Winter Festival is held every July and brings the whole community together. It also attracts people from all over South Africa. Music by local South African artists is the main attraction. The festival also hosts a kid's zone for young visitors as well as food stalls, artist exhibits, and whisky pairings stands.
