= Emakhazeni Local Municipality =

Coordinates: 25°35′S 30°5′E

Emakhazeni
- Local municipality
- Seal

- Location in Mpumalanga
- Country: South Africa
- Province: Mpumalanga
- District: Nkangala
- Seat: Belfast
- Wards: 8

Government
  - Type: Municipal council
  - Mayor: Thomas Diphepheng Ngwenya

Area
  - Total: 4,736 km^{2} (1,829 sq mi)

Population (2011)
  - Total: 47,216
  - Density: 9.970/km^{2} (25.82/sq mi)

Racial makeup (2011)
  - Black African: 87.2%
  - Coloured: 1.2%
  - Indian/Asian: 0.7%
  - White: 10.8%

First languages (2011)
  - Swazi: 28.3%
  - Zulu: 21.8%
  - Southern Ndebele: 18.7%
  - Afrikaans: 10.7%
  - Other: 20.5%
- Time zone: UTC+2 (SAST)
- Municipal code: MP314

Emakhazeni Municipality (Swazi: Masipaladi wase Makhazeni; Zulu: UMasipala wase Makhazeni; Southern Ndebele: UMasipaladi weMakhazeni; Afrikaans: Emakhazeni Munisipaliteit) formerly Highlands Municipality, is a local municipality within the Nkangala District Municipality, in the Mpumalanga province of South Africa. The seat is Belfast (also known as eMakhazeni).

== Main places ==
The 2011 census divided the municipality into the following main places:

Place	Code	Area (km^{2})	Population	Most spoken language
Belfast		80.0	4,564	Afrikaans
Dullstroom		30.4	558	English
Emgwenya		38.88	6,178	Swazi
eNtokozweni		33.17	8,835	Swazi
Machadodorp		25.61	106	Swazi
Sakhelwe		1.86	4,664	Northern Sotho
Siyathuthuka		3.33	12,159	Zulu
Waterval Boven		1.54	7	Swazi
Remainder of the municipality		4,576.32	10,146	Southern Ndebele

== Politics ==
The municipal council consists of fifteen members elected by mixed-member proportional representation. Eight councillors are elected by first-past-the-post voting in eight wards, while the remaining seven are chosen from party lists so that the total number of party representatives is proportional to the number of votes received. In the election of 1 November 2021 the African National Congress (ANC) won a majority of ten seats on the council.

The following table shows the results of the election.

Party	Ward			List			Total seats
Party	Votes	%	Seats	Votes	%	Seats	Total seats
African National Congress	7,902	63.90	8	7,961	63.93	2	10
Economic Freedom Fighters	2,348	18.99	0	2,356	18.92	3	3
Democratic Alliance	1,734	14.02	0	1,721	13.82	2	2
Independent candidates	28	0.23	0				0
2 other parties	354	2.86	0	415	3.33	0	0
Total	12,366	100.00	8	12,453	100.00	7	15
Valid votes	12,366	98.56		12,453	98.62		
Invalid/blank votes	181	1.44		174	1.38		
Total votes	12,547	100.00		12,627	100.00		
Registered voters/turnout	26,486	47.37		26,486	47.67		
