= Roossenekal =

- Location within Limpopo Location within South Africa
- Coordinates: 25.195°S 29.925°E
- Country: South Africa
- Province: Limpopo
- District: Sekhukhune
- Municipality: Elias Motsoaledi

Area
  - Total: 2.52 km^{2} (0.97 sq mi)

Population (2011)
  - Total: 2,625
  - Density: 1,040/km^{2} (2,700/sq mi)

Racial makeup (2011)
  - Black African: 92.5%
  - Coloured: 0.7%
  - Indian/Asian: 0.5%
  - White: 6.1%
  - Other: 0.3%

First languages (2011)
  - Northern Sotho: 67.3%
  - S. Ndebele: 8.8%
  - Afrikaans: 6.3%
  - Zulu: 3.3%
  - Other: 14.3%
- Time zone: UTC+2 (SAST)
- PO box: 1066
- Area code: 013

Roossenekal is a town in Elias Motsoaledi Local Municipality in the Limpopo province of South Africa.

Village on the western slopes of the Steenkampsberg, 95 km north-east of Middelburg. It was proclaimed in January 1886 and named after two soldiers who died in the war against Mapoch's tribe - Stefanus Johannes Roos, Field-Cornet of the Potchefstroom commando, and Frederick Senekal, Commandant of the Rustenburg commando.
