= Belfast, Mpumalanga =

Belfast
- eMakhazeni
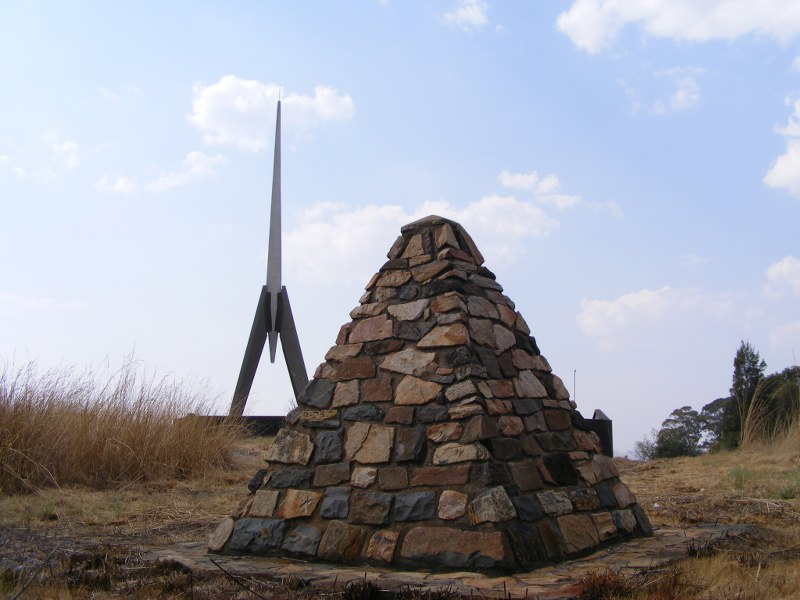
- Battle of Berg-en-dal Memorial south of Belfast.

- Location within Mpumalanga Location within South Africa
- Coordinates: 25°41′S 30°1′E
- Country: South Africa
- Province: Mpumalanga
- District: Nkangala
- Municipality: Emakhazeni

Area
  - Total: 35.82 km^{2} (13.83 sq mi)
- Elevation: 2,025 m (6,644 ft)

Population (2011)
  - Total: 4,466
  - Density: 124.7/km^{2} (322.9/sq mi)

Racial makeup (2011)
  - Black African: 39.9%
  - Coloured: 4.4%
  - Indian/Asian: 2.6%
  - White: 52.6%
  - Other: 0.5%

First languages (2011)
  - Afrikaans: 57.1%
  - Zulu: 12.3%
  - Swazi: 7.6%
  - English: 6.9%
  - Other: 16.0%
- Time zone: UTC+2 (SAST)
- Postal code (street): 1100
- PO box: 1100
- Area code: 013

Belfast (also known as eMakhazeni) is a small town in Mpumalanga Province, South Africa. It is situated in the eMakhazeni Local Municipality in the Nkangala District Municipality.

The town is renowned for its excellent trout fishing conditions. Sheep and dairy farming take place here as well as maize, potatoes and timber are produced. Coal and a black granite are mined around Belfast. Around 6 million tulip bulbs are produced here annually for export; the flowers are discarded. Belfast is 2,025 m above sea level and one of the coldest and highest towns in South Africa.

== Etymology ==
The town was named after Richard Charles O'Neil from Belfast, Northern Ireland, who owned the farm on which the town was built.

== History ==
=== Anglo-Boer War ===
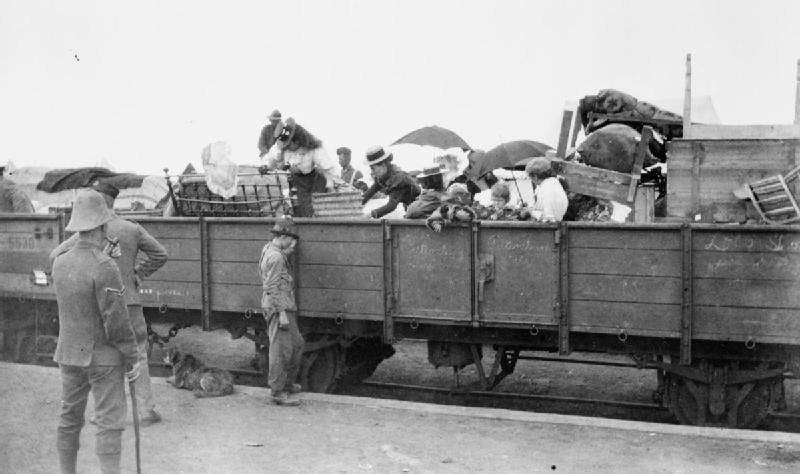
The Second Boer War, 1899-1902. Train, full of probably Boer refugees, at a British Army camp at Belfast.

During the Anglo-Boer War several battles and skirmishes took place in and around the town. The Battle of Leliefontein took place 30 km south of here at the Komati river, an engagement for which several Victoria Crosses were awarded to Canadian soldiers. The British built a concentration camp here during the Boer War to house Boer women and children. Several Victoria Crosses were awarded for action at Monument Hill which is on the edge of the town. During the war Meyer de Kock and his family resided in town. He was a member of the local peace committee and visited the Boer commandos to persuade them to surrender. He was convicted by them of high treason and executed by firing squad on 12 February 1901.

The Battle of Bergendal took place along the railway line east of the town Belfast in what was then the South African Republic. It lasted from 21 to 27 August 1900. The 7,000 Boers were under the command of General Louis Botha, whose headquarters were at a railway station called Dalmanutha. The 19,000 British Empire forces were under the overall command of Lord Roberts. General Sir Redvers Buller led the final assault against the Boer position on the farm Berg-en-dal (Hill-and-dale).

== Geography ==
=== Climate ===
Belfast has a subtropical highland climate (Cwb, according to the Köppen climate classification), with mild summers and chilly, dry winters. The average annual precipitation is 674 mm (27 in), with most rainfall occurring during summer.

Climate data for Belfast, Mpumalanga (1961–1990)
Month	Jan	Feb	Mar	Apr	May	Jun	Jul	Aug	Sep	Oct	Nov	Dec	Year
Record high °C (°F)	31 (88)	30 (86)	28 (82)	30 (86)	25 (77)	24 (75)	26 (79)	26 (79)	31 (88)	32 (90)	31 (88)	31 (88)	32 (90)
Mean daily maximum °C (°F)	23 (73)	22 (72)	22 (72)	20 (68)	18 (64)	15 (59)	16 (61)	18 (64)	22 (72)	22 (72)	22 (72)	23 (73)	20 (68)
Mean daily minimum °C (°F)	12 (54)	12 (54)	11 (52)	8 (46)	4 (39)	1 (34)	1 (34)	3 (37)	6 (43)	8 (46)	10 (50)	11 (52)	7 (45)
Record low °C (°F)	1 (34)	1 (34)	0 (32)	−3 (27)	−4 (25)	−7 (19)	−6 (21)	−8 (18)	−4 (25)	−3 (27)	1 (34)	2 (36)	−8 (18)
Average precipitation mm (inches)	170 (6.7)	101 (4.0)	83 (3.3)	53 (2.1)	16 (0.6)	7 (0.3)	5 (0.2)	9 (0.4)	33 (1.3)	93 (3.7)	156 (6.1)	152 (6.0)	878 (34.6)
Average precipitation days (≥ 1.0 mm)	13	10	9	6	3	1	1	2	3	9	13	13	83
Source: South African Weather Service

== Infrastructure ==
This town has a railway station for the loading and unloading of passengers and cargo on the Pretoria–Maputo railway.

== See also ==
- Battle of Leliefontein
- Battle of Bergendal
