= List of heritage sites in the Western Cape Province, South Africa =

This is a list of the heritage sites in the Western Cape Province, South Africa, as recognized by the South African Heritage Resource Agency.

For additional provincial heritage sites declared by Heritage Western Cape, the provincial heritage resources authority of the Western Cape Province of South Africa, please see the entries at the end of the list. These sites have been declared subsequent to the implementation of the new legislation on 1 April 2000 and unlike those in the SAHRA portion of the list are not former national monuments declared by the former National Monuments Council, the predecessor of both SAHRA and Heritage Western Cape. In the instance of these sites the "identifier" code used is that of Heritage Western Cape rather than SAHRA.

For performance reasons, the following districts have been split off:

- List of heritage sites in Beaufort West
- List of heritage sites in Bellville
- List of heritage sites in Caledon
- List of heritage sites in Cape Town CBD, the Waterfront, and the Bo-Kaap
- List of heritage sites near Cape Town
- List of heritage sites in Clanwilliam
- List of heritage sites in George and Mossel Bay
- List of heritage sites in Knysna
- List of heritage sites in Paarl
- List of heritage sites in Simonstown
- List of heritage sites in Robertson and Montagu
- List of heritage sites in Stellenbosch, Somerset West, and Strand
- List of heritage sites in Swellendam and Riversdale
- List of heritage sites in Table Mountain
- List of heritage sites in Tulbagh
- List of heritage sites in Worcester
- List of heritage sites in Wynberg

SAHRA identifier	Site name	Description	Town	District	NHRA status	Coordinates	Image
9/2/013/0001	Fishermen's Cottages, Hotagterklip, Struis Bay, Bredasdorp District	Some 32 kilometres from Bredasdorp, at Hotagterklip near Struis Bay, the new macadamized road cuts through one of these villages. A few houses were destroyed in making the road, but there are attractive groups of dwellings on either side of it. The three houses on the grassy slope on the right-hand side are about sixty years old and have recently been well restored by the Divisional Council of Bredasdorp. They have been raised to the status of proclaimed historical monuments.	Struisbaai	Bredasdorp	Provincial Heritage Site	34°47′42″S 20°02′36″E	Some 32 kilometres from Bredasdorp, at Hotagterklip near Struis Bay, the new macadamized road cuts through one of these villages. A few houses were destroyed in making the road, but there are attractive groups of dwellings on either side of it. The three houses on the grassy slope on the right-hand side are about sixty years old and have recently been well restored by the Divisional Council of Bredasdorp. They have been raised to the status of proclaimed historical monuments.
9/2/013/0001/001	3 Fishermen's Cottages, Hotagterklip, Struis Bay	This property consists of nine fishermen's cottages which are worthy of preservation in view of various architectural and historical consideration. Type of site: House; Previous use: Residential. Current use: House.	Struis Bay	Bredasdorp	Provincial Heritage Site	34°47′37″S 20°02′27″E	This property consists of nine fishermen's cottages which are worthy of preservation in view of various architectural and historical consideration. Type of site: House Previous use: Residential. Current use: House.
9/2/013/0001/002	4 Fishermen's Cottages, Hotagterklip, Struis Bay	Until quite recently the fishermen's villages, most of them hardly more than hamlets, constituted some of the most interesting and picturesque features to be seen along the coast from Saldanha Bay to far beyond Cape L'Agulhas. Type of site: House; Previous use: Residential. Current use: House. This impressive architectural complex consists of nine fishermen's cottages, which are all typical examples of the traditional vernacular style.	Struis Bay	Bredasdorp	Provincial Heritage Site	34°47′37″S 20°02′28″E	Until quite recently the fishermen's villages, most of them hardly more than hamlets, constituted some of the most interesting and picturesque features to be seen along the coast from Saldanha Bay to far beyond Cape L'Agulhas. Type of site: House Previous use: Residential. Current use: House. This impressive architectural complex consists of nine fishermen's cottages, which are all typical examples of the traditional vernacular style.
9/2/013/0001/3	5 Fishermen's Cottages, Hotagterklip, Struis Bay, Bredasdorp District		Struisbaai	Bredasdorp			Upload Photo
9/2/013/0002	Waenhuiskrans (Kassiesbaai) Fishing Village, Arniston	Until quite recently the fishermen's villages, most of them hardly more than hamlets, constituted some of the most interesting and picturesque features to be seen along the coast from Saldanha Bay to far beyond Cape L'Agulhas. Type of site: House; Previous use: residential. Current use: House.	Arniston	Bredasdorp	Provincial Heritage Site	34°39′48″S 20°13′53″E	Until quite recently the fishermen's villages, most of them hardly more than hamlets, constituted some of the most interesting and picturesque features to be seen along the coast from Saldanha Bay to far beyond Cape L'Agulhas. Type of site: House Previous use: residential. Current use: House.
9/2/013/0003	BREDASDORP MUNICIPAL AREA, GENERAL		Bredasdorp	Bredasdorp			Upload Photo
9/2/013/0004	Bredasdorp Museum, Independent Street, Bredasdorp	This is the Bredasdorp Museum Complex which is already proclaimed a national monument. The Rectory and the former Anglican Church, now a hall, date from the earliest years of the town. The Rectory is a very fine Old Cape thatched house. Now the complex forms the Bredasdorp Museum. The former house of the Rector of the Anglican Church in Bredasdorp. Type of site: House; Previous use: Residence : Parsonage. Current use: Museum.	Bredasdorp	Bredasdorp	Provincial Heritage Site	34°31′58″S 20°02′18″E	This is the Bredasdorp Museum Complex which is already proclaimed a national monument. The Rectory and the former Anglican Church, now a hall, date from the earliest years of the town. The Rectory is a very fine Old Cape thatched house. Now the complex forms the Bredasdorp Museum. The former house of the Rector of the Anglican Church in Bredasdorp. Type of site: House Previous use: Residence : Parsonage. Current use: Museum.
9/2/013/0005	Mountain View, Kreupelhout Drive, Bredasdorp	Rectangular building in the vernacular style, hipped, thatched roof, eyebrow gable over front door. Outbuildings to rear This oblong house, with its predominantly Cape Dutch features, dates from approximately 1840. Type of site: House; Previous use: Residential. Current use: House.	Bredasdorp	Bredasdorp	Provincial Heritage Site	34°32′30″S 20°02′26″E	Rectangular building in the vernacular style, hipped, thatched roof, eyebrow gable over front door. Outbuildings to rear This oblong house, with its predominantly Cape Dutch features, dates from approximately 1840. Type of site: House Previous use: Residential. Current use: House.
9/2/013/0006	Proposed memorial for the East Indiaman "Arniston"		Arniston	Bredasdorp			
9/2/013/0007	Dutch Reformed Church, Main Street, Napier	This cruciform church was erected in 1926. Despite a variety of architectural styles – as evidenced by the high gable walls in particular – the building forms a harmonious unit. Type of site: Church; Previous use: Church. Current use: Church : Dutch Reformed.	Napier	Bredasdorp	Provincial Heritage Site	34°28′24″S 19°53′58″E	This cruciform church was erected in 1926. Despite a variety of architectural styles – as evidenced by the high gable walls in particular – the building forms a harmonious unit. Type of site: Church Previous use: Church. Current use: Church : Dutch Reformed.
9/2/013/0008	Cape L'Agulhas Lighthouse, Bredasdorp District	The tower is circular with the former living- quarters on both sides, and of a height of 65 feet. This lighthouse was completed in 1849 at a cost of approximately R24 000 and is the second oldest existing structure of its kind in South Africa. Since then it has contributed largely towards reducing the number of shipwrecks on the most dangerous part of the South African coastline. Type of site: Lighthouse; Current use: Lighthouse.		Bredasdorp	Provincial Heritage Site	34°49′42″S 20°00′33″E	The tower is circular with the former living- quarters on both sides, and of a height of 65 feet. This lighthouse was completed in 1849 at a cost of approximately R24 000 and is the second oldest existing structure of its kind in South Africa. Since then it has contributed largely towards reducing the number of shipwrecks on the most dangerous part of the South African coastline. Type of site: Lighthouse Current use: Lighthouse. Media related to Cape Agulhas Lighthouse at Wikimedia Commons
9/2/013/0009	25 Church Street, Bredasdorp		Bredasdorp	Bredasdorp		34°32′03″S 20°02′25″E	Upload Photo
9/2/013/0010	Alfred Dowling Building, Bredasdorp		Bredasdorp	Bredasdorp			Upload Photo
9/2/013/0011	Dollas Downs 264, Bredasdorp District			Bredasdorp	Provisional Protection	34°32′00″S 20°02′30″E	Upload Photo
9/2/013/0012	St. Saviours Anglican Church, Napier, Bredasdorp District		Bredasdorp	Bredasdorp	Demolished		Upload Photo
9/2/013/0013	NAPIER MUNICIPAL AREA, GENERAL		Napier	Bredasdorp			Upload Photo
9/2/013/0014	ELIM VILLAGE, BREDASDORP DISTRICT, GENERAL		Elim	Bredasdorp			Upload Photo
9/2/013/0015	Burial site of Birkenhead casualties, Danger Point, Bredasdorp		Danger Point	Bredasdorp			Upload Photo
9/2/013/0016	Ratel Rivier, Buffel Jagd, Bredasdorp District		Bredasdorp	Bredasdorp			Upload Photo
9/2/013/0017	Springfield 287, Bredasdorp District	Originally Soutspansberg, together with Rhenosterkop, first title deed 1747. Came under separate title in 1869. Owned by Lord de Saumarez after WW2. Type of site: Farm; Previous use: farm residence. Current use: farm residence. Springfield is one of the earliest farms in the Bredasdorp area and demonstrates a series of ownership by some of the influential personalities of the day. The complex of buildings forms a cohesive and unique group that has remained unspoilt		Bredasdorp	Provincial Heritage Site	34°32′05″S 20°02′39″E	Upload Photo
9/2/013/0018	Fisherman's Cottage, Pratt Street, Arniston	Type of site: House Current use: Residential. A particularly fine example of the folk architecture of South Africa.	Arniston	Bredasdorp	Provincial Heritage Site	34°40′09″S 20°13′55″E	Type of site: House Current use: Residential. A particularly fine example of the folk architecture of South Africa.
9/2/013/0019	14 and 16 Lourens Street, Bredasdorp	Two restored and already proclaimed 3-bay thatched cottages. These two houses in the typical vernacular style date from approximately the middle of the nineteenth century. Together they form an interesting unit and an important architectural element of Bredasdorp. Type of site: House; Current use: House.	Bredasdorp	Bredasdorp	Provincial Heritage Site	34°32′02″S 20°02′05″E	Two restored and already proclaimed 3-bay thatched cottages. These two houses in the typical vernacular style date from approximately the middle of the nineteenth century. Together they form an interesting unit and an important architectural element of Bredasdorp. Type of site: House Current use: House.
9/2/013/0020	De Hoop Nature Reserve, Bredasdorp District		Bredasdorp	Bredasdorp		34°25′20″S 20°32′43″E	
9/2/013/0020/001	De Hoop homestead, De Hoop Nature Reserve, Bredasdorp District	This farmstead consists of five historic buildings which dates from approximately the late eighteenth century. The group of buildings with its large "werf" and surrounding ring-wall, forms a unique historical and architectural complex.		Bredasdorp	Provincial Heritage Site	34°27′18″S 20°23′54″E	This farmstead consists of five historic buildings which dates from approximately the late eighteenth century. The group of buildings with its large "werf" and surrounding ring-wall, forms a unique historical and architectural complex.
9/2/013/0020/2	Melkkamer, De Hoop Nature Reserve, Bredasdorp District		Bredasdorp	Bredasdorp	Pending		Upload Photo
9/2/013/0021	Old Anglican Church, Main Road, Struisbaai	Type of site: Church Previous use: Church. Current use: Church : Dutch Reformed.	Struisbaai	Bredasdorp	Provincial Heritage Site	34°48′03″S 20°03′07″E	Type of site: Church Previous use: Church. Current use: Church : Dutch Reformed.
9/2/013/0023	Cottages, Rhenosterkop, Bredasdorp District	This property, which is situated on the coast in the so-called Duineveld and on which large numbers of milk-wood trees are found, is of considerable importance both as a natural resource and from the point of view of ecology. Type of site: House; Previous use: residential. Current use: residential – holiday cottages.		Bredasdorp	Provincial Heritage Site	34°45′45″S 19°55′52″E	Upload Photo
9/2/013/0024	White milkwood tree, Rhenosterfontein, Bredasdorp District	Type of site: Tree. This milkwood tree on the farm Rhenosterfontein was in 1991 described by the Dendrological Association of SA as the largest identified example of its kind. It is possible that the tree could be between 600 and 1000 years old.		Bredasdorp	Provincial Heritage Site	34°29′48″S 20°07′37″E	Upload Photo
9/2/013/0025	Old Police Station & gaol, 16 Hope Street, Bredasdorp		Bredasdorp	Bredasdorp			Upload Photo
9/2/013/0026	STRUISBAAI LOCAL AREA, BREDASDORP DISTRICT, GENERAL		Struisbaai	Bredasdorp			Upload Photo
9/2/013/0027	L'AGULHAS LOCAL AREA, BREDASDORP DISTRICT, GENERAL		L'Agulhas	Bredasdorp			Upload Photo
9/2/013/0028	Southernmost tip of Africa, L'Agulhas, Bredasdorp District		L'Agulhas	Bredasdorp		34°49′51″S 20°00′44″E	Upload Photo
9/2/013/0029	BREDASDORP MAGISTERIAL DISTRICT, GENERAL		Bredasdorp	Bredasdorp			Upload Photo
9/2/013/0030	Agulhas National Park, Bredasdorp District		Bredasdorp	Bredasdorp		34°44′28″S 19°51′57″E	
9/2/013/0031	Baardskeerdersbos, Bredasdorp District		Bredasdorp	Bredasdorp			Upload Photo
9/2/013/0032	ARNISTON LOCAL AREA, GENERAL		Arniston	Bredasdorp			Upload Photo
9/2/013/0033	Struis Point Beacon, Arniston		Arniston	Bredasdorp			Upload Photo
9/2/013/0034	17 Matthee Street, Bredasdorp		Bredasdorp	Bredasdorp		34°32′10″S 20°02′18″E	Upload Photo
9/2/016/0001	Dutch Reformed Church, Andries Pretorius Street, Calitzdorp	Type of site: Church Current use: Church : Dutch Reformed.	Calitzdorp	Calitzdorp	Provincial Heritage Site	33°31′44″S 21°41′18″E	Type of site: Church Current use: Church : Dutch Reformed.
9/2/016/0002	1 Queen Street, Calitzdorp		Calitzdorp	Calitzdorp	Pending Declaration	33°32′08″S 21°41′07″E	Upload Photo
9/2/016/0003	Warmwater, Calitzdorp		Calitzdorp	Calitzdorp		33°39′42″S 21°46′28″E	Upload Photo
9/2/016/0004	Hermies, 21 Voortrekker Street, Calitzdorp		Calitzdorp	Calitzdorp		33°31′53″S 21°41′46″E	Upload Photo
9/2/016/0005	Mossienes, Calitzdorp		Calitzdorp	Calitzdorp			Upload Photo
9/2/016/0006	CALITZDORP MUNICIPAL AREA, GENERAL		Calitzdorp	Calitzdorp			Upload Photo
9/2/016/0007	CALITZDORP MAGISTERIAL AREA, GENERAL		Calitzdorp	Calitzdorp			Upload Photo
9/2/021/0001	Old Tollhouse, Michell's Pass, Ceres	The Old Tollhouse was built shortly after the completion of Michell's Pass in 1848. From 1 January 1849 toll charges were collected here on animals and vehicles. Since the Michell's Pass opened an easy route to the north and because, when diamonds were subsequently discovered, it was on the main route from the Cape, the tollhouse played an exceptionally important role. Type of site: Toll	Ceres	Ceres	Provincial Heritage Site	33°23′27″S 19°17′10″E	The Old Tollhouse was built shortly after the completion of Michell's Pass in 1848. From 1 January 1849 toll charges were collected here on animals and vehicles. Since the Michell's Pass opened an easy route to the north and because, when diamonds were subsequently discovered, it was on the main route from the Cape, the tollhouse played an exceptionally important role. Type of site: Toll
9/2/021/0002	Zandrug Farm, Kagga Kamma Nature Reserve, Ceres District		Ceres	Ceres			Upload Photo
9/2/021/0003	Michell's Pass, Ceres District		Ceres	Ceres	Pending Declaration	33°22′44″S 19°17′47″E	Upload Photo
9/2/021/0004	Cemetery, Owen Street, Ceres		Ceres	Ceres		33°22′32″S 19°18′30″E	Upload Photo
9/2/021/0005	Karoopoort Outspan, Ceres District	Werf wall enclosing two buildings. The first a langhuis with thatched roof and oven attached to the back. The second a large rectangular outhouse with tin roof and dormered loft entrance with ladder. Type of site: House; Current use: Vacant. Karoopoort was a well-known and popular outspan for early travellers to the North. It was described, among others, by the travellers Lichtenstein and Burchell at the beginning of the nineteenth century. There are also three historic buildings on the site		Ceres	Provincial Heritage Site	33°13′06″S 19°42′12″E	Werf wall enclosing two buildings. The first a langhuis with thatched roof and oven attached to the back. The second a large rectangular outhouse with tin roof and dormered loft entrance with ladder. Type of site: House Current use: Vacant. Karoopoort was a well-known and popular outspan for early travellers to the North. It was described, among others, by the travellers Lichtenstein and Burchell at the beginning of the nineteenth century. There are also three historic buildings on the site
9/2/021/0006	Rocklands, Ceres District		Ceres	Ceres			Upload Photo
9/2/021/0007	Nature Reserve, Ceres		Ceres	Ceres			Upload Photo
9/2/021/0008	CERES MUNICIPAL AREA, GENERAL		Ceres	Ceres			Upload Photo
9/2/021/0009	Boplaas, Ceres District	Collection of buildings: H-shaped house with good internal woodwork and partially glazed screen, soap making house, watermill, and outbuilding with stairs to loft door under thatch roof. Exterior of main house somewhat changed. This farm has since 1743 been in the possession of the Van der Merwe family and is well-known in the Afrikaans literature through the works of I. W. van der Merwe (Boerneef). The historic buildings date mostly from the beginning of the 19th century. Type of site: House; Current use: Homestead.		Ceres	Provincial Heritage Site	32°58′45″S 19°21′55″E	Upload Photo
9/2/021/0010	Verlorenvlei, Ceres District	H-Shaped house, with gables at back and front. Ugly lean-to added along the back. Interesting Dutch detailing on windows, unusual dormer casement in tin roof. Out buildings appear old and in bad repair. This farm previously formed part of the original farm Verloren Valley, which was granted to Schalk Willem Pienaar in 1833. The H-shaped dwelling that dates from 1827 was presumably erected by him. The outbuildings, which date from the early nineteenth century, are also of interest. Type of site: House; Current use: Homestead. Take the R46 from Ceres in a north easterly direction. Continue on the R46 when it turns south before Karoopoort. The turn-off to the farm is approx 10 km along this road.		Ceres	Provincial Heritage Site	33°17′00″S 19°42′30″E	H-Shaped house, with gables at back and front. Ugly lean-to added along the back. Interesting Dutch detailing on windows, unusual dormer casement in tin roof. Out buildings appear old and in bad repair. This farm previously formed part of the original farm Verloren Valley, which was granted to Schalk Willem Pienaar in 1833. The H-shaped dwelling that dates from 1827 was presumably erected by him. The outbuildings, which date from the early nineteenth century, are also of interest. Type of site: House Current use: Homestead. Take the R46 from Ceres in a north easterly direction. Continue on the R46 when it turns south before Karoopoort. The turn-off to the farm is approx 10 km along this road. Media related to Verlorenvlei at Wikimedia Commons
9/2/021/0011	Nooitgedacht, Ceres District	Thatched 5 bayed house with wolfneus gable containing window opening. Impressive loft staircase. Victorian, central double door with fanlight. 2 pairs of French windows with fanlights. Stoep with round steps leading up. Traces of corrugated iron verandah. Type of site: House; Current use: Vacant. Take the Port Alfred Hamlet road out of Ceres, over Gydo Pass. 4.5 km north of Gydo take the turn-off to the right (signed Odessa). 4 km further there is a fork, take the road to the left. The turn-off signed 'Malabar' to the farm is 3 km along this road, to the left. This farmhouse is an important and typical example of the traditional building style of the Koue Bokkeveld.		Ceres	Provincial Heritage Site	33°08′30″S 19°22′30″E	Upload Photo
9/2/021/0012	Excelsior, Ceres District	Late Victorian farm house, with thatched outbuilding. Type of site: House; Previous use: Residential. Current use: House. Take the Prince Alfred Hamlet road out of Ceres, over Gydo Pass and on until just after Op die Berg. Turn right just after Op die Berg and continue along the road until Excelsior is reached.		Ceres	Provincial Heritage Site	32°57′45″S 19°25′55″E	Upload Photo
9/2/021/0013	Jan Mostert's Road and Toll House, Michell's Pass, Ceres District	Type of site: Toll		Ceres	Register	33°22′00″S 19°19′01″E	Type of site: Toll Media related to Michell's Pass Toll House at Wikimedia Commons
9/2/021/0014	CERES MAGISTERIAL DISTRICT, GENERAL.		Ceres	Ceres			Upload Photo
9/2/021/0015	Uintjieskraal, Ceres District		Ceres	Ceres	Pending		Upload Photo
9/2/021/0016	Gydo Pass, Ceres District		Ceres	Ceres		33°14′05″S 19°19′48″E	Upload Photo
9/2/021/0017	PRINCE ALFRED HAMLET		Prince Alfred Hamlet			33°17′07″S 19°19′30″E	Upload Photo
9/2/031/0001	Houses in The Mead, Pinelands, Goodwood District		Pinelands	Goodwood			
9/2/031/0001/001	17 The Mead, Pinelands, Cape Town	Type of site: House. This is part of the oldest so-called garden city in South Africa.	Cape Town, Pinelands	Goodwood	Provincial Heritage Site	33°56′28″S 18°29′50″E	Upload Photo
9/2/031/0001/002	16 Meadway, Pinelands, Cape Town	Type of site: House Historical and architectural interest The Pinelands Garden City originated with Richard Stuttaford, who actively promoted this new concept. The town planner and architect Albert J. Thompson drew up the plans in 1919. In 1923 the original section known as the Meadway was laid out and built on State land that previously formed part of the Uitvlugt Forest Reserve.	Cape Town, Pinelands	Goodwood	Provincial Heritage Site	33°56′27″S 18°29′52″E	Type of site: House Historical and architectural interest The Pinelands Garden City originated with Richard Stuttaford, who actively promoted this new concept. The town planner and architect Albert J. Thompson drew up the plans in 1919. In 1923 the original section known as the Meadway was laid out and built on State land that previously formed part of the Uitvlugt Forest Reserve.
9/2/031/0001/003	3 Meadway, Pinelands, Cape Town	Type of site: House. This is part of the oldest so-called garden city in South Africa.	Cape Town, Pinelands	Goodwood	Provincial Heritage Site	33°56′30″S 18°29′50″E	Type of site: House. This is part of the oldest so-called garden city in South Africa.
9/2/031/0001/004	12 Meadway Pinelands, Cape Town	Type of site: House. This is part of the oldest so-called garden city in South Africa.	Cape Town, Pinelands	Goodwood	Provincial Heritage Site	33°56′28″S 18°29′52″E	Upload Photo
9/2/031/0001/005	13 The Mead, Pinelands, Cape Town	Type of site: House. This is part of the oldest so-called garden city in South Africa.	Cape Town, Pinelands	Goodwood	Provincial Heritage Site	33°56′28″S 18°29′48″E	Upload Photo
9/2/031/0001/006	4 Meadway, Pinelands, Cape Town	Type of site: House. This is part of the oldest so-called garden city in South Africa.	Cape Town, Pinelands	Goodwood	Provincial Heritage Site	33°56′31″S 18°29′52″E	Upload Photo
9/2/031/0001/007	1 Meadway, Pinelands, Cape Town	Type of site: House. Historical and architectural interest The Pinelands Garden City originated with Richard Stuttaford, who actively promoted this new concept. The town planner and architect Albert J. Thompson drew up the plans in 1919. In 1923 the original section known as the Meadway was laid out and built on State land that previously formed part of the Uitvlugt Forest Reserve.	Cape Town, Pinelands	Goodwood	Provincial Heritage Site	33°56′27″S 18°29′51″E	Upload Photo
9/2/031/0001/008	19 Meadway, Pinelands, Cape Town	Type of site: House. This is part of the oldest so-called garden city in South Africa.	Cape Town, Pinelands	Goodwood	Provincial Heritage Site	33°56′27″S 18°29′49″E	Upload Photo
9/2/031/0001/009	7 The Mead, Pinelands, Cape Town	Type of site: House. This is part of the oldest so-called garden city in South Africa.	Cape Town, Pinelands	Goodwood	Provincial Heritage Site	33°56′31″S 18°29′48″E	Type of site: House. This is part of the oldest so-called garden city in South Africa.
9/2/031/0001/010	11 The Mead, Pinelands, Cape Town		Cape Town, Pinelands	Goodwood	Provincial Heritage Site	33°56′29″S 18°29′48″E	
9/2/031/0001/011	15 The Mead, Pinelands, Cape Town	Type of site: House. This is part of the oldest so-called garden city in South Africa.	Cape Town, Pinelands	Goodwood	Provincial Heritage Site	33°56′28″S 18°29′48″E	Type of site: House. This is part of the oldest so-called garden city in South Africa.
9/2/031/0001/012	5 The Mead, Pinelands, Cape Town	Type of site: House. This is part of the oldest so-called garden city in South Africa.	Cape Town, Pinelands	Goodwood	Provincial Heritage Site	33°56′20″S 18°29′29″E	Type of site: House. This is part of the oldest so-called garden city in South Africa.
9/2/031/0001/013	2 Meadway, Pinelands, Cape Town	Type of site: House. This is part of the oldest so-called garden city in South Africa.	Cape Town, Pinelands	Goodwood	Provincial Heritage Site	33°56′32″S 18°29′52″E	Type of site: House. This is part of the oldest so-called garden city in South Africa.
9/2/031/0001/014	10 Meadway, Pinelands, Cape Town	Type of site: House. Historical and architectural interest The Pinelands Garden City originated with Richard Stuttaford, who actively promoted this new concept. The town planner and architect Albert J. Thompson drew up the plans in 1919.	Cape Town, Pinelands	Goodwood	Provincial Heritage Site	33°56′18″S 18°29′34″E	Upload Photo
9/2/031/0001/016	14 Meadway, Pinelands, Cape Town	Type of site: House This is part of the oldest so-called garden city in South Africa.	Cape Town, Pinelands	Goodwood	Provincial Heritage Site	33°56′27″S 18°29′52″E	Type of site: House This is part of the oldest so-called garden city in South Africa.
9/2/031/0001/017	9 The Mead, Pinelands, Cape Town	Type of site: House This is part of the oldest so-called garden city in South Africa.	Cape Town, Pinelands	Goodwood	Provincial Heritage Site	33°56′29″S 18°29′48″E	Type of site: House This is part of the oldest so-called garden city in South Africa.
9/2/031/0001/018	8 The Mead, Pinelands	Type of site: House This is one of the oldest garden cities in South Africa.	Cape Town, Pinelands	Goodwood	Provincial Heritage Site	33°56′29″S 18°29′52″E	Type of site: House This is one of the oldest garden cities in South Africa.
9/2/031/0001/019	The Mead Open Space and Meadway Road Reserve, Pinelands	This is one of the oldest garden cities in South Africa	Cape Town, Pinelands	Goodwood	Provincial Heritage Site	33°56′30″S 18°29′51″E	This is one of the oldest garden cities in South Africa
9/2/031/0001/15	No 6, Meadway, Pinelands, Goodwood District		Goodwood	Goodwood		33°56′30″S 18°29′52″E	Upload Photo
9/2/031/0002	Maitland Cemetery, Voortrekker Road, Maitland		Maitland	Goodwood		33°55′06″S 18°31′18″E	Upload Photo
9/2/031/0003	Alexandra Hospital, Maitland		Maitland	Goodwood		33°55′45″S 18°29′08″E	Upload Photo
9/2/031/0003/1	De Nieuwe Molen, Alexandra Hospital, Maitland		Maitland	Goodwood			Upload Photo
9/2/031/0004	GOODWOOD MUNICIPAL AREA, GENERAL		Goodwood	Goodwood			Upload Photo
9/2/031/0005	MAITLAND, GOODWOOD DISTRICT, GENERAL		Maitland	Goodwood			Upload Photo
9/2/031/0006	Woltemade Cricket Field, Pinelands		Pinelands	Goodwood		33°55′19″S 18°30′30″E	Upload Photo
9/2/031/0007	Milestone IV, Voortrekker Road, Maitland		Maitland	Goodwood			Upload Photo
9/2/031/0008	GOODWOOD MAGISTERIAL DISTRICT, GENERAL		Goodwood	Goodwood			Upload Photo
9/2/031/0009	PINELANDS LOCAL AREA, GENERAL		Pinelands	Goodwood			Upload Photo
9/2/031/0010	NDABENI LOCAL AREA, GENERAL		Ndabeni	Goodwood			Upload Photo
9/2/031/0011	100 Caledon Street, Goodwood		Goodwood	Goodwood	Register	33°54′28″S 18°32′31″E	Upload Photo
9/2/031/0012	61 Fitzroy Street, Goodwood, Cape Town		Cape Town, Goodwood	Goodwood	Register	33°54′33″S 18°32′43″E	
9/2/031/0013	65 Fitzroy Street, Goodwood, Cape Town		Cape Town, Goodwood	Goodwood	Register	33°54′32″S 18°32′43″E	
9/2/031/0014	39 Goodwood Street, Goodwood, Cape Town		Cape Town, Goodwood	Goodwood	Register	33°54′38″S 18°32′53″E	
9/2/031/0015	41 Goodwood Street, Goodwood, Cape Town		Cape Town, Goodwood	Goodwood	Register	33°54′37″S 18°32′53″E	Upload Photo
9/2/031/0016	43 Church Street, Goodwood		Goodwood	Goodwood	Register	33°54′34″S 18°32′58″E	Upload Photo
9/2/031/0017	WINGFIELD LOCAL AREA, GENERAL		Goodwood	Goodwood			Upload Photo
9/2/031/0018	Goodwood Museum, cnr Church and Merriman Streets, Goodwood		Goodwood	Goodwood		33°54′34″S 18°32′58″E	Upload Photo
9/2/039/0001	Doornboom, cnr Fourie & Rall Streets, Heidelberg		Heidelberg	Heidelberg		34°05′17″S 20°57′38″E	Upload Photo
9/2/039/0002	HEIDELBERG MUNICIPAL AREA, GENERAL		Heidelberg	Heidelberg			Upload Photo
9/2/039/0003	Vermaaklikheid, Heidelberg District		Heidelberg	Heidelberg		34°18′10″S 21°01′35″E	Upload Photo
9/2/039/0004	Barry Church, Port Beaufort	This church was built by the Barry family in 1849 as an interdenominational chapel for the inhabitants of Port Beaufort. Port Beaufort lies at the mouth of the Breede River. Here the little Barry church stands as a memorial to the busy industry that once flourished there. Type of site: Church; Current use: Church.	Port Beaufort	Heidelberg	Provincial Heritage Site	34°08′40″S 20°51′32″E	This church was built by the Barry family in 1849 as an interdenominational chapel for the inhabitants of Port Beaufort. Port Beaufort lies at the mouth of the Breede River. Here the little Barry church stands as a memorial to the busy industry that once flourished there. Type of site: Church Current use: Church.
9/2/039/0005	Benjamin Moodie Memorial, Barracouta Street, Witsand	Type of site: Memorial. Benjamin Moodie, his brothers and their descendants have from 1817 contributed to the development of Southern Africa. At his own initiative Moodie brought to the Cape the first large group of settlers from the British Isles.	Witsand	Heidelberg	Register	34°23′43″S 20°50′38″E	Upload Photo
9/2/039/0006	Slangrivier, Meerlust, Heidelberg District		Heidelberg	Heidelberg		34°08′15″S 20°51′43″E	Upload Photo
9/2/039/0007	Dutch Reformed Church, Church Square, Heidelberg	The corner stone of this impressive cruciform church was laid on 13 February 1913 and the building was officially inaugurated on 7 March 1914. It is the third church building to be erected on this site since the founding of the Dutch Reformed Congregation; Type of site: Church; Current use: Church : Dutch Reformed.	Heidelberg	Heidelberg	Provincial Heritage Site	34°06′07″S 20°57′58″E	Upload Photo
9/2/039/0008	Krombeksrivier Homestead, Heidelberg District	This farmhouse, built predominantly in the Cape Dutch style, was erected in about 1740—1744. The Krombeksrivier homestead is not only one of the oldest farmhouses in the vicinity but also one of the earliest outspans on the road to the eastern frontier.		Heidelberg	Provincial Heritage Site	34°05′04″S 20°56′55″E	Upload Photo
9/2/039/0009	Southey's Arms, Glamorgan, Heidelberg District			Heidelberg	Provincial Heritage Site	34°05′06″S 20°58′27″E	Upload Photo
9/2/039/0010	HEIDELBERG MAGISTERIAL DISTRICT, GENERAL		Heidelberg	Heidelberg			Upload Photo
9/2/039/0011	Groot Vaders Bosch, Heidelberg District		Heidelberg	Heidelberg			Upload Photo
9/2/039/0012	Westfield, Heidelberg District		Heidelberg	Heidelberg			Upload Photo
9/2/039/0013	WITSAND MUNICIPAL AREA, HEIDELBERG DISTRICT, GENERAL		Witsand	Heidelberg			Upload Photo
9/2/040/0001	HERMANUS MUNICIPAL AREA, GENERAL		Hermanus	Hermanus			Upload Photo
9/2/040/0002	Proposed "HMS Birkenhead" memorial, Danger Point, Hermanus District		Danger Point	Hermanus			Upload Photo
9/2/040/0003	Die Kelders Caves, Klipgat, Hermanus District		Hermanus	Hermanus	Pending Declaration		Upload Photo
9/2/040/0004	Stanford House, 20 Queen Victoria Street, Hermanus		Hermanus	Hermanus		34°26′21″S 19°27′20″E	Upload Photo
9/2/040/0005	STANFORD MUNICIPAL AREA, HERMANUS DISTRICT, GENERAL		Stanford	Hermanus			Upload Photo
9/2/040/0006	Burgundy Restaurant, Hermanus	Type of site: Restaurant These two fishermen's cottages in the vernacular style date from the nineteenth century and are among the earliest buildings erected in Hermanus.	Hermanus	Hermanus	Provincial Heritage Site	34°25′15″S 19°14′35″E	Type of site: Restaurant These two fishermen's cottages in the vernacular style date from the nineteenth century and are among the earliest buildings erected in Hermanus.
9/2/040/0007	4 De Villiers Street, Onrus River	The building is said to be the first in Onrus River. It is a good example of its type – being a simple long stone dwelling. Together with the properties located at 6 & 8 De Villiers Street it forms the core of the old properties in Onrusrivier.	Onrus River	Hermanus	Register	34°24′53″S 19°10′24″E	Upload Photo
9/2/040/0008	6 De Villiers Street, Onrus River	The building is a late Victorian seaside house, twinned with its neighbour, 8 de Villiers Street (which is currently being investigated with a view to a possible recommendation that it be declared). Together with the properties located at 4 & 8 De Villiers Street it forms the core of the old properties in Onrusrivier.	Onrus River	Hermanus	Register	34°24′52″S 19°10′23″E	Upload Photo
9/2/040/0009	8 De Villiers Street, Onrus River	The house is an excellent example of a late 19th / early 20th century purpose built holiday house – one of only a few along this coast. The house is largely in its original condition. One of the owners, Mr C Joel Krige, was a well-known local politician. Together with the properties located at 4 & 6 De Villiers Street it forms the core of the old properties in Onrusrivier.	Onrus River	Hermanus	Register	34°24′53″S 19°10′22″E	Upload Photo
9/2/040/0010	Windheuwel Farm, Hermanus District		Hermanus	Hermanus			Upload Photo
9/2/040/0011	Linkerhandsgat Farm, Hermanus District		Hermanus	Hermanus			Upload Photo
9/2/040/0012	Old Harbour, Hermanus	Type of site: Harbour	Hermanus	Hermanus	Provincial Heritage Site	34°25′14″S 19°14′38″E	Type of site: Harbour Media related to Old Harbour, Hermanus at Wikimedia Commons
9/2/040/0013	HERMANUS MAGISTERIAL DISTRICT, GENERAL		Hermanus	Hermanus			Upload Photo
9/2/040/0014	Danger Point Lighthouse, Hermanus District		Danger Point	Hermanus		34°37′49″S 19°18′09″E	Upload Photo
9/2/040/0014/1	Birkenhead Memorial Tablet, Danger Point, Hermanus District		Danger Point	Hermanus			Upload Photo
9/2/040/0015	De Kelders Cave & Mineral Spring, Gansbaai, Hermanus District		Gansbaai	Hermanus	National Monument	34°33′21″S 19°21′51″E	Upload Photo
9/2/040/0016	Conservation Area, Stanford, Hermanus District		Stanford	Hermanus	Conservation area		Upload Photo
9/2/040/0017	Proposed Birkenhead Memorial Tablet, Hawston, Hermanus District		Hawston	Hermanus			Upload Photo
9/2/040/0018	ONRUSRIVIER LOCAL AREA, GENERAL		Onrusrivier	Hermanus			Upload Photo
9/2/040/0019	Old Whaling Station, Stony Point, Betty's Bay, Hermanus District		Betty's Bay	Hermanus		34°22′17″S 18°53′35″E	Upload Photo
9/2/040/0020	Godfrey cottages, Erven 822, 6190 & 6191, Hermanus		Hermanus	Hermanus	Pending Declaration		Upload Photo
9/2/040/0021	GANSBAAI MUNICIPAL AREA, GENERAL		Gansbaai	Hermanus			Upload Photo
9/2/040/0022	Site of Leper Colony, Hemel-en-aarde, Hermanus District		Hemel-en-aarde	Hermanus			Upload Photo
9/2/040/0023	HAWSTON LOCAL AREA, GENERAL		Hawston	Hermanus			Upload Photo
9/2/042/0001	Geelbek, Hopefield District		Geelbek	Hopefield		33°11′43″S 18°07′24″E	
9/2/042/0001/001	Farmstead, Geelbek 360, Hopefield District	Type of site: Farm Complex		Hopefield	Provincial Heritage Site	33°11′45″S 18°07′30″E	Type of site: Farm Complex
9/2/042/0001/002	VOC Beacon, Geelbek 360, Hopefield District	About 500 m north-east of the farmhouse and not far from the shore of the la goon there stands in the grassy veld about 35 steps from a row of gumtrees, a beacon of blue-black Malmesbury shale with the inscription G \VOC (Geoktrooieerde Verenigde Oos-Indi This black slate stone beacon with the inscription G VOC chiselled thereon was presumably erected in 1785 by Governor Cornelis Jacobus van der Graaff to indicate the western boundary of the Cape District. The farm Geelbek, earlier called Geelbekefontein, Type of site: Beacon		Hopefield	Provincial Heritage Site	33°11′45″S 18°07′30″E	About 500 m north-east of the farmhouse and not far from the shore of the la goon there stands in the grassy veld about 35 steps from a row of gumtrees, a beacon of blue-black Malmesbury shale with the inscription G \VOC (Geoktrooieerde Verenigde Oos-Indi This black slate stone beacon with the inscription G VOC chiselled thereon was presumably erected in 1785 by Governor Cornelis Jacobus van der Graaff to indicate the western boundary of the Cape District. The farm Geelbek, earlier called Geelbekefontein, Type of site: Beacon
9/2/042/0001/1	Farmstead, Geelbek, Hopefield District		Geelbek	Hopefield	National Monument	33°11′40″S 18°07′31″E	Upload Photo
9/2/042/0001/2	VOC Beacon, Geelbek, Hopefield District		Geelbek	Hopefield	National Monument		Upload Photo
9/2/042/0002	Bottelary, West Coast National Park, Langebaan, Hopefield District		Langebaan	Hopefield		33°08′00″S 18°06′00″E	Upload Photo
9/2/042/0003	LANGEBAAN MUNICIPAL AREA, GENERAL		Langebaan	Hopefield			Upload Photo
9/2/042/0004	HOPEFIELD MUNICIPAL AREA, GENERAL		Hopefield	Hopefield			Upload Photo
9/2/042/0005	Old Whaling Station, Salamander Bay, Hopefield District		Salamander Bay	Hopefield			Upload Photo
9/2/042/0005/1	Cemetery, Old Whaling Station, Salamander Bay, Hopefield District		Salamander Bay	Hopefield			Upload Photo
9/2/042/0007	Meeuwenklip, Egret Street, Langebaan, Hopefield District		Langebaan	Hopefield			Upload Photo
9/2/042/0008	Dutch Reformed Church, Oostewal Street, Langebaan	This church with its Neo-Gothic features was donated to the parish of Hopefield in 1872 as a chapel of ease by a member of the congregation, Mr Willem van der Byl. The church building was taken into use on 1 April 1872. The yellowwood pulpit inside the church Type of site: Church; Previous use: Church. Current use: Church hall.	Langebaan	Hopefield	Provincial Heritage Site	33°05′51″S 18°01′51″E	Upload Photo
9/2/042/0010	Oosterwal, Hopefield District	The Oesterwal complex is a typical West Coast farm complex in simple vernacular style architecture with straight end gables and parapets. It consists of a large quadrangled structure which was originally an H-shaped house altered to serve as Residency; Type of site: Farmhouse The farm Oostewal, which borders on the Langebaan Lagoon, with its springs of fresh water was a favourite port of call of ships and vessels from all over the world during the 17th and 18th centuries as this was the only source of fresh water in the area.		Hopefield	Provincial Heritage Site	33°07′10″S 18°03′15″E	Upload Photo
9/2/042/0011	HOPEFIELD MAGISTERIAL DISTRICT, GENERAL		Hopefield	Hopefield			Upload Photo
9/2/042/0011/1	Coastal archaeology, Hopefield District		Hopefield	Hopefield			Upload Photo
9/2/042/0012	Langrietvlei, Hopefield District		Hopefield	Hopefield	National Monument	32°52′23″S 18°13′28″E	
9/2/042/0012-001	Homestead, Langrietvlei 72, Hopefield District	Granted in 1715 to Hendrik Oostwald Eksteen. When Lichtenstein and Holman stopped at the farm it belonged to Jacob Laubscher. It has been in the Kotze family since 1834. This T-shaped Cape Dutch house, with its impressive concavo-convex gables, was probably erected in 1789. At that time the property belonged to Jacob Laubscher who, according to Lichtenstein, was one of the most prosperous colonists in the country. Type of site: House; Current use: Dwelling.		Hopefield	Provincial Heritage Site	32°53′20″S 18°16′15″E	Granted in 1715 to Hendrik Oostwald Eksteen. When Lichtenstein and Holman stopped at the farm it belonged to Jacob Laubscher. It has been in the Kotze family since 1834. This T-shaped Cape Dutch house, with its impressive concavo-convex gables, was probably erected in 1789. At that time the property belonged to Jacob Laubscher who, according to Lichtenstein, was one of the most prosperous colonists in the country. Type of site: House Current use: Dwelling.
9/2/042/0013	Oude Post Fortification, Langebaan Lagoon, Hopefield District		Hopefield	Hopefield	Pending Declaration		Upload Photo
9/2/042/0014	Langebaanweg quarry fossil site, Hopefield District			Hopefield	Provincial Heritage Site	32°57′54″S 18°06′51″E	
9/2/042/0015	Oude Post 11, Hopefield District		Hopefield	Hopefield	Pending Declaration		Upload Photo
9/2/042/0016	Elandsfontein Farm, Hopefield District		Hopefield	Hopefield		33°05′39″S 18°12′08″E	Upload Photo
9/2/042/0017	Fossilised Footprints, Langebaan Lagoon		Langebaan	Hopefield			Upload Photo
9/2/054/0001	KUILS RIVER MUNICIPAL AREA, GENERAL		Kuils River	Kuils River			Upload Photo
9/2/054/0002	Saxenbug, Kuils River District		Kuils River	Kuils River		33°56′48″S 18°43′08″E	Upload Photo
9/2/054/0003	Hazendal, Bottelary Road, Kuils River District			Kuils River	Provincial Heritage Site	33°54′10″S 18°42′12″E	
9/2/054/0004	Zevenfontein, Kuils River District	Type of site: Farmstead This fine Old-Cape house with its attractive front gable and garden wall was built about 1800.		Kuils River	Provincial Heritage Site	33°56′19″S 18°42′28″E	Upload Photo
9/2/054/0005	Milestone XV, Kuils River Municipality, Kuils River	This elongated sandstone milestone, with the Roman numerals XV thereon, presumably dates from the late eighteenth or early nineteenth century and was previously situated on the road between Bellville and Kuils River. Type of site: Milestone	Kuils River	Kuils River	Provincial Heritage Site	33°55′36″S 18°40′48″E	This elongated sandstone milestone, with the Roman numerals XV thereon, presumably dates from the late eighteenth or early nineteenth century and was previously situated on the road between Bellville and Kuils River. Type of site: Milestone
9/2/054/0006	Leeuwenhof, 6 Bosman Street, Kuils River		Kuils River	Kuils River		33°55′16″S 18°40′39″E	Upload Photo
9/2/054/0007	KUILS RIVER MAGISTERIAL DISTRICT, GENERAL		Kuils River	Kuils River			Upload Photo
9/2/054/0008	BRACKENFELL LOCAL AREA, GENERAL		Brackenfell	Kuils River			Upload Photo
9/2/054/0009	KRAAIFONTEIN LOCAL AREA		Kraaifontein	Kuils River			Upload Photo
9/2/054/0010	Mooiplaas, Kuils River District	Type of site: Farm Complex		Kuils River	Provincial Heritage Site	33°56′34″S 18°41′37″E	Type of site: Farm Complex
9/2/056/0001	Olyve River, Van Wyksdorp, Ladismith District		Ladismith	Ladismith			Upload Photo
9/2/056/0002	76 Albert Street, Ladismith		Van Wyksdorp	Ladismith		33°29′34″S 21°16′09″E	Upload Photo
9/2/056/0003	LADISMITH MUNICIPAL AREA, GENERAL		Ladismith	Ladismith			Upload Photo
9/2/056/0004	Old Dutch Reformed Church, Church Street, Ladismith	This church was consecrated on 30 May 1874. It was designed and built in the neo-Gothic style by the well-known architect Carl Otto Hager. Type of site: Church; Previous use: Church. Current use: Vacant.	Ladismith	Ladismith	Provincial Heritage Site	33°29′36″S 21°15′56″E	This church was consecrated on 30 May 1874. It was designed and built in the neo-Gothic style by the well-known architect Carl Otto Hager. Type of site: Church Previous use: Church. Current use: Vacant.
9/2/056/0005	Anglican Church, Ladismith		Ladismith	Ladismith			Upload Photo
9/2/056/0005/1	Grave in churchyard of Anglican Church, Ladismith		Ladismith	Ladismith			Upload Photo
9/2/056/0007	Van Wyksdorp Military Graves, Van Wyksdorp		Van Wyksdorp	Ladismith			Upload Photo
9/2/056/0008	Town Cemetery, Van Wyksdorp, Ladismith		Van Wyksdorp	Ladismith			Upload Photo
9/2/056/0009	Amalienstein Mission Complex, Ladismith District	Type of site: Mission Station	Amalienstein	Ladismith	Provincial Heritage Site	33°29′00″S 21°28′00″E	Type of site: Mission Station
9/2/056/0009/001	Church, Amalienstein Mission Complex, Ladismith District	Type of site: Church	Amalienstein	Ladismith	Provincial Heritage Site	33°29′00″S 21°28′00″E	Type of site: Church
9/2/056/0009/1	Lutheran Church Building, Amalienstein, Ladismith District		Ladismith	Ladismith			Upload Photo
9/2/056/0009/2	Cemetery, Amalienstein Mission Complex, Ladismith District		Ladismith	Ladismith			Upload Photo
9/2/056/0010	Lutheran Church complex, Church Street, Ladismith	Type of site: Church Complex	Ladismith	Ladismith	Provincial Heritage Site	33°29′07″S 21°15′56″E	Type of site: Church Complex
9/2/056/0010/1	Lutheran Church, Church Street, Ladismith		Ladismith	Ladismith	National Monument		Upload Photo
9/2/056/0010/2	Old Lutheran Church Parsonage, Church Street, Ladismith		Ladismith	Ladismith	National Monument		Upload Photo
9/2/056/0010/3	Lutheran Church Hall, Church Street, Ladismith		Ladismith	Ladismith	National Monument		Upload Photo
9/2/056/0010/4	Lutheran Church Offices, Church Street, Ladismith		Ladismith	Ladismith	National Monument		Upload Photo
9/2/056/0011	Old Wesleyan Church, Becker Street, Ladismith	Type of site: Church. Current use: Church.	Ladismith	Ladismith	Provincial Heritage Site	33°29′35″S 21°15′52″E	Type of site: Church. Current use: Church.
9/2/056/0012	Fossil site, Besemfontein, Ladismith District		Ladismith	Ladismith			Upload Photo
9/2/056/0013	Oakdene, 50 Church Street, Ladismith	This stately double-storeyed house was erect by the immigrant Heinrich Wilhelm Becker in 1876. He was Mayor of Ladismith for an unbroken period of 32 years. Type of site: House; Current use: Residential. This stately double-storeyed house was erect by the immigrant Heinrich Wilhelm Becker in 1876. He was Mayor of Ladismith for an unbroken period of 32 years.	Ladismith	Ladismith	Provincial Heritage Site	33°29′35″S 21°15′56″E	This stately double-storeyed house was erect by the immigrant Heinrich Wilhelm Becker in 1876. He was Mayor of Ladismith for an unbroken period of 32 years. Type of site: House Current use: Residential. This stately double-storeyed house was erect by the immigrant Heinrich Wilhelm Becker in 1876. He was Mayor of Ladismith for an unbroken period of 32 years.
9/2/056/0014	58 Church Street, Ladismith		Ladismith	Ladismith	Provincial Heritage Site	33°29′48″S 21°15′52″E	
9/2/056/0015	19 Queen Street, Ladismith		Ladismith	Ladismith	Provincial Heritage Site	33°29′37″S 21°16′02″E	Upload Photo
9/2/056/0016	Birthplace of C J Langenhoven, Hoeko, Ladismith District		Ladismith	Ladismith			Upload Photo
9/2/056/0017	Seweweekspoort, Ladismith District		Ladismith	Ladismith		33°24′01″S 21°24′00″E	Upload Photo
9/2/056/0018	Albert Manor, 44 Albert Street, Ladismith	Type of site: Residence. Previous use: Residence. Current use: Guest House.	Ladismith	Ladismith	Provincial Heritage Site	33°29′38″S 21°16′09″E	Type of site: Residence. Previous use: Residence. Current use: Guest House.
9/2/056/0019	Hoffland House, Church Street, Ladismith		Ladismith	Ladismith			Upload Photo
9/2/056/0020	LADISMITH MAGISTERIAL GENERAL		Ladismith	Ladismith			Upload Photo
9/2/056/0021	ZOAR LOCAL AREA		Ladismith	Ladismith			Upload Photo
9/2/056/0022	Military Graves, Van Zylsdam Farm, Ladismith District		Ladismith	Ladismith			Upload Photo
9/2/058/0001	Matjiesfontein Village, Laingsburg District	Victorian village developed as health resort by James Logan in the 1880s. Used as military base and hospital by British forces in Anglo-Boer War. Entire village bought in 1965 by David Rawdon and redeveloped. Type of site: Village Turn off from N1. Village is 1 km from turn-off. The historic Matjiesfontein Village was built between 1895 and 1907 by Mr J. Logan. It was developed as a spa and as such it became the meeting place of historical figures like Cecil Rhodes and Olive Schreiner.	Matjiesfontein	Laingsburg	Provincial Heritage Site	33°13′51″S 20°34′57″E	Victorian village developed as health resort by James Logan in the 1880s. Used as military base and hospital by British forces in Anglo-Boer War. Entire village bought in 1965 by David Rawdon and redeveloped. Type of site: Village Turn off from N1. Village is 1 km from turn-off. The historic Matjiesfontein Village was built between 1895 and 1907 by Mr J. Logan. It was developed as a spa and as such it became the meeting place of historical figures like Cecil Rhodes and Olive Schreiner. Media related to Matjiesfontein at Wikimedia Commons
9/2/058/0002	Railway Station building, Matjiesfontein, Laingsburg District	Type of site: Railway Station Current use: Railway station.	Matjiesfontein	Laingsburg	Provincial Heritage Site	33°13′53″S 20°34′57″E	Type of site: Railway Station Current use: Railway station. Media related to Matjiesfontein station at Wikimedia Commons
9/2/058/0003	Dutch Reformed Church, Voortrekker Street, Laingsburg	Stone church with plaster decoration and corrugated iron roof. Square tower with squat spire. First church building consecrated 1881. Congregation established 6 December 1882. Second building designed by W H Ford, consecrated 20 April 1905. Damaged by flood waters in 1981. Restored by Gabriel Fagan. Commemorative plaque unveiled 5 Dec 1982. Type of site: Church; Previous use: Church. Current use: Church : Dutch Reformed.	Laingsburg	Laingsburg	Provincial Heritage Site	33°11′42″S 20°51′06″E	Stone church with plaster decoration and corrugated iron roof. Square tower with squat spire. First church building consecrated 1881. Congregation established 6 December 1882. Second building designed by W H Ford, consecrated 20 April 1905. Damaged by flood waters in 1981. Restored by Gabriel Fagan. Commemorative plaque unveiled 5 Dec 1982. Type of site: Church Previous use: Church. Current use: Church : Dutch Reformed.
9/2/058/0004	Matjiesfontein Cemetery, Pieter Meintjiesfontein, Laingsburg District	A small cemetery containing the graves of, amongst others, Maj Gen A G Wauchope and James Logan. Type of site: Graveyard East of N1 and south of Koppie approx 10 kilometres south of Matjiesfontein.		Laingsburg	Provincial Heritage Site	33°14′00″S 20°35′16″E	A small cemetery containing the graves of, amongst others, Maj Gen A G Wauchope and James Logan. Type of site: Graveyard East of N1 and south of Koppie approx 10 kilometres south of Matjiesfontein. Media related to Matjiesfontein cemetery at Wikimedia Commons
9/2/058/0005	Municipal Cemetery, Laingsburg		Laingsburg	Laingsburg	Pending Declaration		Upload Photo
9/2/058/0006	LAINGSBURG MUNICIPAL AREA, GENERAL		Laingsburg	Laingsburg			Upload Photo
9/2/058/0007	Anglo-Boer War blockhouse, Geelbek River, Laingsburg District	This blockhouse stands some 14 km north of Laingsburg at a point where the national road and the railway line cross a tributary of the Buffalo River. It is one of the best preserved examples of the blockhouses built during the Anglo-Boer War (1899–1902). This blockhouse belongs to the type that was erected to protect key positions and especially bridges. It is a double-storeyed stone building Type of site: Blockhouse; Previous use: Fortification. A very fine example of the blockhouses erected during the Anglo-Boer War.		Laingsburg	Provincial Heritage Site	33°10′32″S 20°59′08″E	This blockhouse stands some 14 km north of Laingsburg at a point where the national road and the railway line cross a tributary of the Buffalo River. It is one of the best preserved examples of the blockhouses built during the Anglo-Boer War (1899–1902). This blockhouse belongs to the type that was erected to protect key positions and especially bridges. It is a double-storeyed stone building Type of site: Blockhouse Previous use: Fortification. A very fine example of the blockhouses erected during the Anglo-Boer War.
9/2/058/0008	Anysberg Nature Reserve, Laingsburg District		Laingsburg	Laingsburg	National Monument	33°27′25″S 20°35′27″E	Upload Photo
9/2/058/0009	Lutheran Church Complex, Laingsburg		Laingsburg	Laingsburg			Upload Photo
9/2/058/0010	LAINGSBURG MAGISTERIAL DISTRICT, GENERAL		Laingsburg	Laingsburg			Upload Photo
9/2/060/0001	MALMESBURY MUNICIPAL AREA, GENERAL		Malmesbury	Malmesbury			Upload Photo
9/2/060/0002	Oude Kerk Museum, Main Street, Riebeeck-Kasteel	Type of site: Church, Museum Previous use: Church. Current use: Museum.	Riebeeck-Kasteel	Malmesbury	Provincial Heritage Site	33°23′00″S 18°53′25″E	Type of site: Church, Museum Previous use: Church. Current use: Museum.
9/2/060/0003	Old Station Building, Arcadia Street, Darling Malmesbury District		Darling	Malmesbury		33°22′30″S 18°22′58″E	Upload Photo
9/2/060/0004	Mission station, Mamre	The Mission Station was founded in 1808 by Moravian missionaries on the site occupied by the Dutch East India Company's military outpost, "'t Groenekloof", from 1701 to 1791. The old farm house (now the parsonage) was certainly built before 1770, and the original gable of the church building bears the date 1818, although later it was slightly altered. Type of site: Mission Station. The Mission Station which is an important place of interest because of both its history and its architectural beauty, was founded in 1808 by Moravian missionaries on the site occupied by the Dutch East India Company's military outpost, "'t Groenekloof".	Mamre	Malmesbury	Provincial Heritage Site	33°30′45″S 18°28′25″E	The Mission Station was founded in 1808 by Moravian missionaries on the site occupied by the Dutch East India Company's military outpost, "'t Groenekloof", from 1701 to 1791. The old farm house (now the parsonage) was certainly built before 1770, and the original gable of the church building bears the date 1818, although later it was slightly altered. Type of site: Mission Station. The Mission Station which is an important place of interest because of both its history and its architectural beauty, was founded in 1808 by Moravian missionaries on the site occupied by the Dutch East India Company's military outpost, "'t Groenekloof". Media related to Mamre mission station at Wikimedia Commons
9/2/060/0004/001	Watermill, Mission station, Mamre	This water-mill dates from about 1840 and is an important part of the existing historic building complex of the mission station at Mamre which was founded in 1808. Type of site: Water Mill; Previous use: Mill.	Mamre	Malmesbury	Provincial Heritage Site	33°30′45″S 18°28′25″E	This water-mill dates from about 1840 and is an important part of the existing historic building complex of the mission station at Mamre which was founded in 1808. Type of site: Water Mill Previous use: Mill. Media related to Mamre Mill at Wikimedia Commons
9/2/060/0005	see 9/2/112/0007			Malmesbury			Upload Photo
9/2/060/0006	see 9/2/112/0010			Malmesbury			Upload Photo
9/2/060/0007	Peppertree House, 17 Station Road, Darling, Malmesbury District		Darling	Malmesbury		33°22′47″S 18°22′47″E	Upload Photo
9/2/060/0008	20 Station Road, Darling, Malmesbury District		Darling	Malmesbury		33°22′47″S 18°22′47″E	Upload Photo
9/2/060/0009	Old Police Station, Darling, Malmesbury District		Darling	Malmesbury			Upload Photo
9/2/060/0010	Groote Post, Malmesbury District	In this area Henning Huising had the right to graze his cattle for he was one of the few who had a meat contract with the Company. These contracts were valuable monopolies and considerable sums were paid for them. It became necessary to establish guards. In 1752 Groote Post was already one of the largest and most important farms in the vicinity of Malmesbury. The impressive homestead and outbuildings date from the early nineteenth century. From 1814 to 1827 it was the country house of Lord Charles Somerset.		Malmesbury	Provincial Heritage Site	33°26′50″S 18°24′15″E	In this area Henning Huising had the right to graze his cattle for he was one of the few who had a meat contract with the Company. These contracts were valuable monopolies and considerable sums were paid for them. It became necessary to establish guards. In 1752 Groote Post was already one of the largest and most important farms in the vicinity of Malmesbury. The impressive homestead and outbuildings date from the early nineteenth century. From 1814 to 1827 it was the country house of Lord Charles Somerset.
9/2/060/0011	Ganzekraal, Malmesbury District		Malmesbury	Malmesbury			Upload Photo
9/2/060/0012	Loedolf House, 6 Loedolf Street, Malmesbury		Malmesbury	Malmesbury		33°27′51″S 18°43′56″E	
9/2/060/0013	Duinefontein, Malmesbury District		Malmesbury	Malmesbury			Upload Photo
9/2/060/0014	Lime kiln, De la Rey, Malmesbury District	This lime kiln is one of two similar structures in the area and one of the few remaining examples of the open kiln type in South Africa. Type of site: Lime kiln		Malmesbury	Provincial Heritage Site	33°20′30″S 18°13′00″E	This lime kiln is one of two similar structures in the area and one of the few remaining examples of the open kiln type in South Africa. Type of site: Lime kiln
9/2/060/0015	Lime kiln, Jacobus Kraal, Malmesbury District	Type of site: Lime kiln This lime kiln is one of two similar structures in the area and one of the few remaining examples of the open kiln type in South Africa.		Malmesbury	Provincial Heritage Site	33°20′30″S 18°13′00″E	Type of site: Lime kiln This lime kiln is one of two similar structures in the area and one of the few remaining examples of the open kiln type in South Africa.
9/2/060/0016	Malmesbury Museum, Prospect Street, Malmesbury	Type of site: Church, Museum Previous use: Synagogue. Current use: Museum. With a flourishing Jewish community in Malmesbury, the old Synagogue, designed by architect B. Goldman, was built in 1911. After the Jewish community started to diminish, the building was transferred to the Municipality of Malmesbury in 1974.	Malmesbury	Malmesbury	Provincial Heritage Site	33°27′58″S 18°43′47″E	Type of site: Church, Museum Previous use: Synagogue. Current use: Museum. With a flourishing Jewish community in Malmesbury, the old Synagogue, designed by architect B. Goldman, was built in 1911. After the Jewish community started to diminish, the building was transferred to the Municipality of Malmesbury in 1974.
9/2/060/0017	Birthplace of General Smuts, Ongegund, Malmesbury District	Birthplace of General J. C. Smuts, Riebeek West About six kilometres due north of Riebeek West, along the road to Moorreesburg, there is a large cement factory. Right in this industrial development, at the edge of a deep quarry, stands a long, narrow house. Jan Christiaan Smuts was born in this house on 24 May 1870.		Malmesbury	Provincial Heritage Site	33°19′25″S 18°51′00″E	Birthplace of General J. C. Smuts, Riebeek West About six kilometres due north of Riebeek West, along the road to Moorreesburg, there is a large cement factory. Right in this industrial development, at the edge of a deep quarry, stands a long, narrow house. Jan Christiaan Smuts was born in this house on 24 May 1870.
9/2/060/0018	Old well, Lewis Stores, 11 Piet Retief Street, Malmesbury	This well is one of three similar structures which was erected in 1751 for the use of communicants on the church square adjoining the original church at Malmesbury. Type of site: Well; Previous use: Well. This well is one of three similar structures which was erected in 1751 for the use of communicants on the church square adjoining the original church at Malmesbury.	Malmesbury	Malmesbury	Provincial Heritage Site	33°27′42″S 18°43′51″E	Upload Photo
9/2/060/0019	Dutch Reformed Church, Kerk Street, Philadelphia	Typical Neo-Gothic cruciform church with decorative corner buttresses. Square bell tower at entrance. This imposing church, the nave of which was consecrated in 1864, was enlarged in 1910 by the addition of two wings, the vestibule and the stately tower. Type of site: Church; Current use: Church : Dutch Reformed. Fine example of ecclesiastical building providing an architectural landmark in the village. Historically and culturally significant in the village history.	Philadelphia	Malmesbury	Provincial Heritage Site	33°40′00″S 18°35′00″E	Typical Neo-Gothic cruciform church with decorative corner buttresses. Square bell tower at entrance. This imposing church, the nave of which was consecrated in 1864, was enlarged in 1910 by the addition of two wings, the vestibule and the stately tower. Type of site: Church Current use: Church : Dutch Reformed. Fine example of ecclesiastical building providing an architectural landmark in the village. Historically and culturally significant in the village history.
9/2/060/0020	New Apostolic Church, 42 Voortrekker Road, Malmesbury	This Neo-Gothic Church, which was designed by Sophia Gray and consecrated in 1859 by Bishop Robert Gray, served the Anglican community until 1975 when a new church was consecrated in Wesbank, resulting in the property being sold to the New Apostolic Church. Type of site: Church; Current use: Church : New Apostolic.	Malmesbury	Malmesbury	Provincial Heritage Site	33°27′51″S 18°43′46″E	Upload Photo
9/2/060/0021	Swartland survey beacon, Klipvlei, Malmesbury District	This pyramid-shaped sandstone beacon, with its mounted platinum pin, forms the western terminal point of Sir Thomas Maclear's Zwartland survey baseline, which was laid in 1840/41. It is closely associated with the development of surveying in South Africa. Type of site: Beacon.		Malmesbury	Provincial Heritage Site	33°16′10″S 18°22′35″E	Upload Photo
9/2/060/0022	Bokkerivier, Bokbaai, Malmesbury District	Type of site: Farm. The farm Bokke Rivier is world-renowned for the Bokbaaivygies, Nemesia and the wealth of other flowers and wild life that flourish there. The farm buildings of Buck Bay are of outstanding historical and aesthetic value.		Malmesbury	Provincial Heritage Site	33°34′25″S 18°19′30″E	Upload Photo
9/2/060/0023	Dutch Reformed Church, Church Street, Malmesbury	This neo-Gothic church building was officially opened on 30 September 1860. The tower, which was added in 1864, collapsed in 1877 and was rebuilt in 1880. The church is closely associated with the establishment of the Swartland congregation, as well as the founding of the town Malmesbury itself. Type of site: Church; Current use: Church : Dutch Reformed.	Malmesbury	Malmesbury	Provincial Heritage Site	33°27′47″S 18°43′48″E	This neo-Gothic church building was officially opened on 30 September 1860. The tower, which was added in 1864, collapsed in 1877 and was rebuilt in 1880. The church is closely associated with the establishment of the Swartland congregation, as well as the founding of the town Malmesbury itself. Type of site: Church Current use: Church : Dutch Reformed. Media related to Dutch Reformed Church, Malmesbury at Wikimedia Commons
9/2/060/0024	14 Faure Street, Malmesbury	This magnificent Victorian double-storeyed house was built at the turn of the century of material imported from abroad. Type of site: House; Current use: Dwelling.	Malmesbury	Malmesbury	Provincial Heritage Site	33°27′41″S 18°43′33″E	This magnificent Victorian double-storeyed house was built at the turn of the century of material imported from abroad. Type of site: House Current use: Dwelling.
9/2/060/0025	C P Hildebran Grave, Stryderfontin, Malmesbury District		Malmesbury	Malmesbury			Upload Photo
9/2/060/0026	Springfontein, Malmesbury District		Malmesbury	Malmesbury			Upload Photo
9/2/060/0027	Klipheuwel Pinkster Tabernakel, San Remo Road, Klipheuwel, Malmesbury		Malmesbury	Malmesbury			Upload Photo
9/2/060/0028	MALMESBURY MAGISTERIAL DISTRICT, GENERAL		Malmesbury	Malmesbury			Upload Photo
9/2/060/0029	Klawervallei, Malmesbury District			Malmesbury	Provincial Heritage Site	33°26′56″S 18°43′18″E	Upload Photo
9/2/060/0030	PHILADELPHIA LOCAL AREA, GENERAL		Malmesbury	Malmesbury			Upload Photo
9/2/060/0031	Rondeberg Farm, Malmesbury District		Malmesbury	Malmesbury		33°25′07″S 18°17′58″E	Upload Photo
9/2/060/0032	Loedolf Street Precinct, Malmesbury		Malmesbury	Malmesbury			Upload Photo
9/2/060/0033	Goedgedacht, Ptn 1 of Farm 1064, Malmesbury District		Malmesbury	Malmesbury			Upload Photo
9/2/060/0034	RIEBEECK WEST LOCAL AREA, GENERAL		Riebeeck West	Malmesbury			Upload Photo
9/2/060/0035	Trafalgar House Precinct, Block Bounded by Church, Rainier, Loedolf & Riebeeck Streets, Malmesbury		Malmesbury	Malmesbury		33°27′49″S 18°43′54″E	Upload Photo
9/2/060/0036	BOTTERBERG LOCAL AREA, GENERAL		Botterberg	Malmesbury			Upload Photo
9/2/060/0037	KALBASKRAAL LOCAL AREA, GENERAL		Kalbaskraal	Malmesbury			Upload Photo
9/2/060/0038	DARLING LOCAL AREA GENERAL		Darling	Malmesbury			Upload Photo
9/2/060/0039	RIEBEECK KASTEEL LOCAL AREA, GENERAL, Malmesbury District		Riebeeck Kasteel	Malmesbury			Upload Photo
9/2/060/0040	PELLA LOCAL AREA GENERAL, Malmesbury District		Pella	Malmesbury			Upload Photo
9/2/065/0001	MURRAYSBURG MAGISTERIAL DISTRICT, GENERAL		Murraysburg	Murraysburg			Upload Photo
9/2/065/0002	MURRAYSBURG MUNICIPAL AREA, GENERAL		Murraysburg	Murraysburg			Upload Photo
9/2/065/0003	Victorian Cottage, 33 Darling Street, Murraysburg		Murraysburg	Murraysburg		31°57′40″S 23°45′40″E	Upload Photo
9/2/065/0004	Old Powder Magazine, Murraysburg	This powder magazine was erected in 1878 on land which was granted to the Municipality by the local church council in 1859. The powder magazine is a simple, rectangular structure with two gables on both sides and a solid copper door in front.	Murraysburg	Murraysburg	Provincial Heritage Site	31°57′34″S 23°46′04″E	Upload Photo
9/2/065/0005	Military Graves, Vleiplaats		Murraysburg	Murraysburg			Upload Photo
9/2/065/0007	Military Graves, Stellenboschvlei, Murraysburg District		Murraysburg	Murraysburg			Upload Photo
9/2/068/0001	Cango Caves, De Kombuis, Oudtshoorn District	This famous attraction is situated in the Cango ward 29 kilometres north of Oudtshoorn. The entrance is in the face of a hill beside the Grobbelaar's River. The maze of caves with their beautiful stalactite formations are most impressive. It is generally accepted that the Caves were discovered in 1780 by a herdsman of a farmer called Van Zyl of Doornrivier (now Herold) while he was looking for lost cattle. Later, this man paid a second visit to the caves accompanied by a schoolmaster. Type of site: Karst cavern		Oudtshoorn	Provincial Heritage Site	33°23′32″S 22°12′52″E	This famous attraction is situated in the Cango ward 29 kilometres north of Oudtshoorn. The entrance is in the face of a hill beside the Grobbelaar's River. The maze of caves with their beautiful stalactite formations are most impressive. It is generally accepted that the Caves were discovered in 1780 by a herdsman of a farmer called Van Zyl of Doornrivier (now Herold) while he was looking for lost cattle. Later, this man paid a second visit to the caves accompanied by a schoolmaster. Type of site: Karst cavern Media related to Cango Caves at Wikimedia Commons
9/2/068/0002	Arbeidsgenot, 217 Jan van Riebeeck Road, Oudtshoorn		Oudtshoorn	Oudtshoorn	Provincial Heritage Site	33°35′10″S 22°11′41″E	
9/2/068/0003	Rus-in-Urbe, Oudtshoorn	Type of site: House	Oudtshoorn	Oudtshoorn	Provincial Heritage Site	33°36′03″S 22°12′09″E	Type of site: House
9/2/068/0004	Old Drill Hall, Camp Street, Oudtshoorn		Oudtshoorn	Oudtshoorn	National Monument		Upload Photo
9/2/068/0005	OUDTSHOORN MUNICIPAL AREA, GENERAL		Oudtshoorn	Oudtshoorn	National Monument		Upload Photo
9/2/068/0006	Hazenjacht Farmstead, Oudtshoorn District	Type of site: Farmstead		Oudtshoorn	Provincial Heritage Site	33°31′30″S 22°11′13″E	Upload Photo
9/2/068/0007	CP Nel Museum, Baron van Rheede Street, Oudtshoorn	This building, now a museum, dates from about 1909 and for some half a century served as a boys' school. Designed in part by Bullock and Vixseboxe, the well known architects, it reflects the former's copiousness and the latter's Transvaal Republic influence. Especially worthy of note is the facade, with its harmonious blending of styles. Type of site: Educational; Previous use: School. Current use: Museum.	Oudtshoorn	Oudtshoorn	Provincial Heritage Site	33°35′31″S 22°12′07″E	This building, now a museum, dates from about 1909 and for some half a century served as a boys' school. Designed in part by Bullock and Vixseboxe, the well known architects, it reflects the former's copiousness and the latter's Transvaal Republic influence. Especially worthy of note is the facade, with its harmonious blending of styles. Type of site: Educational Previous use: School. Current use: Museum. Media related to CP Nel Museum at Wikimedia Commons
9/2/068/0007/1	Memorial, C P Nel Museum, Baron van Reede Street, Oudtshoorn		Oudtshoorn	Oudtshoorn	National Monument	33°35′32″S 22°12′07″E	Upload Photo
9/2/068/0008	Welgeluk Ostrich Palace, Oudtshoorn District	Type of site: House Constructed during 1910, Welgeluk is regarded as one of the finest examples of the so-called "ostrich palaces"		Oudtshoorn	Provincial Heritage Site	33°33′55″S 22°11′03″E	Type of site: House Constructed during 1910, Welgeluk is regarded as one of the finest examples of the so-called "ostrich palaces"
9/2/068/0009	Greylands Ostrich Palace, Oudtshoorn District	Type of site: House Constructed during 1911, Greylands is regarded as one of the best examples of the so-called "ostrich palaces"		Oudtshoorn	Provincial Heritage Site	33°33′42″S 22°13′11″E	Upload Photo
9/2/068/0010	Herrie's Stone, Meiringspoort, Oudtshoorn District	C.J. Langenhoven (1873–1932), Afrikaans writer, champion of the Afrikaans language and author of the South African National Anthem, chiselled the name of the well-known elephant Herrie, from his book Sonde met die Bure, on this rock in July 1929.		Oudtshoorn	Provincial Heritage Site	33°32′49″S 22°15′20″E	C.J. Langenhoven (1873–1932), Afrikaans writer, champion of the Afrikaans language and author of the South African National Anthem, chiselled the name of the well-known elephant Herrie, from his book Sonde met die Bure, on this rock in July 1929.
9/2/068/0011	Methodist Church Complex, 77 St. Saviour Street, Oudtshoorn		Oudtshoorn	Oudtshoorn	National Monument	33°35′12″S 22°12′17″E	Upload Photo
9/2/068/0012	Magistrate's Residence, 77 Baron van Rheede Street, Oudtshoorn		Oudtshoorn	Oudtshoorn		33°35′08″S 22°12′10″E	Upload Photo
9/2/068/0013	Hartebeeshuisie, 6 Plein Street, Oudtshoorn		Oudtshoorn	Oudtshoorn		33°36′22″S 22°12′45″E	Upload Photo
9/2/068/0014	Montagu House, Baron van Rheede Street, Oudtshoorn		Oudtshoorn	Oudtshoorn			Upload Photo
9/2/068/0015	Gottland House, 72 Baron van Rheede Street, Oudtshoorn	Type of site: House Previous use: Residential. Current use: Old age home. Gottland House was built by Charles Bullock in 1902 in the opulent style prevailing during the ostrich feather boom. It is in the Victorian style with Art Nouveau elements.	Oudtshoorn	Oudtshoorn	Provincial Heritage Site	33°36′03″S 22°12′09″E	Type of site: House Previous use: Residential. Current use: Old age home. Gottland House was built by Charles Bullock in 1902 in the opulent style prevailing during the ostrich feather boom. It is in the Victorian style with Art Nouveau elements.
9/2/068/0016	Dutch Reformed Church and Parsonage, Le Roux Street, De Rust	This cruciform church with its neo-Gothic characteristics, was designed by the architect George Wallis of Oudtshoorn. The corner-stone was laid on 28 November 1900 by the Rev. J. A. Beyers and the building was officially inaugurated on 28 November 1902. The impressive pulpit designed by another local architect, J. E. Vixseboxse, and installed in 1911, is also noteworthy. The old hall, which was erected in 1904, was used as school from 1904 to 1913. At present it serves as church hall. Type of site: Church and Parsonage	De Rust	Oudtshoorn	Provincial Heritage Site	33°29′25″S 22°32′10″E	This cruciform church with its neo-Gothic characteristics, was designed by the architect George Wallis of Oudtshoorn. The corner-stone was laid on 28 November 1900 by the Rev. J. A. Beyers and the building was officially inaugurated on 28 November 1902. The impressive pulpit designed by another local architect, J. E. Vixseboxse, and installed in 1911, is also noteworthy. The old hall, which was erected in 1904, was used as school from 1904 to 1913. At present it serves as church hall. Type of site: Church and Parsonage
9/2/068/0017	Watermill, Voelgesang, De Rust, Oudtshoorn District	This double-storeyed water-mill with its enormous iron wheel dates from the 1890s. Type of site: Water Mill. Previous use: Mill.		OudtshoornTh	Provincial Heritage Site	33°31′38″S 22°17′29″E	Upload Photo
9/2/068/0018	Dutch Reformed Church, Volmoed, Oudtshoorn District	Type of site: Church. Current use: Church : Dutch Reformed.		Oudtshoorn	Provincial Heritage Site	33°34′12″S 22°13′21″E	Upload Photo
9/2/068/0019	Oakdene, 99 Baron van Rheede Street, Oudtshoorn	Type of site: House. Current use: House.	Oudtshoorn	Oudtshoorn	Provincial Heritage Site	33°34′42″S 22°12′20″E	Type of site: House. Current use: House.
9/2/068/0020	146 High Street, Oudtshoorn	This richly ornamented Victorian, house is one of the so-called "ostrich palaces" and was designed by the well known architect Charles Bullock. It was erected during 1909/10 for J. H. J. le Roux of the farm Baakenskraal at a stage when the ostrich feather industry was its peak.	Oudtshoorn	Oudtshoorn	Provincial Heritage Site	33°34′46″S 22°12′12″E	This richly ornamented Victorian, house is one of the so-called "ostrich palaces" and was designed by the well known architect Charles Bullock. It was erected during 1909/10 for J. H. J. le Roux of the farm Baakenskraal at a stage when the ostrich feather industry was its peak.
9/2/068/0021	Mimosa Lodge, 85 Baron van Rheede Street, Oudtshoorn	Type of site: House Current use: House.	Oudtshoorn	Oudtshoorn	Provincial Heritage Site	33°34′43″S 22°12′20″E	Type of site: House Current use: House.
9/2/068/0022	St. Jude's Church complex, Oudtshoorn		Oudtshoorn	Oudtshoorn	National Monument		Media related to St Jude's Church, Oudtshoorn at Wikimedia Commons
9/2/068/0022/001	St Jude's Church, Baron van Rheede Street, Oudtshoorn	The historical St Jude's Church was originally designed by Sophia Gray, wife of Bishop Robert Gray and completed in 1863. The building is closely linked with the history of Oudtshoorn and of the Anglican Church in South Africa. Type of site: Church; Current use: Church : Anglican.	Oudtshoorn	Oudtshoorn	Provincial Heritage Site	33°34′43″S 22°12′20″E	The historical St Jude's Church was originally designed by Sophia Gray, wife of Bishop Robert Gray and completed in 1863. The building is closely linked with the history of Oudtshoorn and of the Anglican Church in South Africa. Type of site: Church Current use: Church : Anglican. Media related to St Jude's Church, Oudtshoorn at Wikimedia Commons
9/2/068/0023	Dutch Reformed Church, High Street, Oudtshoorn	The foundation stone of this church was laid on 15 January 1861, but because of financial and other problems it could only be consecrated on 7 June 1879. George Wallace was responsible for the building plans. Type of site: Church. Current use: Church : Dutch Reformed.	Oudtshoorn	Oudtshoorn	Provincial Heritage Site	33°36′27″S 22°02′38″E	The foundation stone of this church was laid on 15 January 1861, but because of financial and other problems it could only be consecrated on 7 June 1879. George Wallace was responsible for the building plans. Type of site: Church. Current use: Church : Dutch Reformed. Media related to Dutch Reformed Church, Oudtshoorn at Wikimedia Commons
9/2/068/0024	Pinehurst, Oudtshoorn	Pinehurst, one of the best known of the so called "ostrich palaces" stands on the western side of the Grobbelaar's River almost in the centre of Oudtshoorn. It is now a part of the men's hostel of the Teachers' Training College.	Oudtshoorn	Oudtshoorn	Provincial Heritage Site	33°36′02″S 22°12′07″E	Upload Photo
9/2/068/0025	Suspension Bridge, Church Street, Oudtshoorn	At the same time as the coastal area from Swellendam to George was being settled, the Little Karoo and its extension beyond the Langeberg and Outeniqua Mountains, the Langkloof, were being explored and occupied by cattle farmers. The break-through to this area occurred successively through the Cogman’s Kloof at Montagu, then through the Attaqua Kloof (or Robinson's Pass) opposite Mossel Bay, and the Cradock Kloof which is traversed by the Outeniqua Pass today. Type of site: Bridge; Current use: Bridge. An attractive suspension bridge built in 1913-1914 and an interesting feature in Oudtshoorn.	Oudtshoorn	Oudtshoorn	Provincial Heritage Site	33°35′17″S 22°12′04″E	At the same time as the coastal area from Swellendam to George was being settled, the Little Karoo and its extension beyond the Langeberg and Outeniqua Mountains, the Langkloof, were being explored and occupied by cattle farmers. The break-through to this area occurred successively through the Cogman’s Kloof at Montagu, then through the Attaqua Kloof (or Robinson's Pass) opposite Mossel Bay, and the Cradock Kloof which is traversed by the Outeniqua Pass today. Type of site: Bridge Current use: Bridge. An attractive suspension bridge built in 1913-1914 and an interesting feature in Oudtshoorn. Media related to Oudtshoorn suspension bridge at Wikimedia Commons
9/2/068/0026	Schoeman House, Rietvallei, Oudtshoorn District			Oudtshoorn	Provincial Heritage Site	33°31′58″S 22°32′28″E	Upload Photo
9/2/068/0027	Vredelus homestead, De Rust, Oudtshoorn District			Oudtshoorn	Provincial Heritage Site	33°29′24″S 22°31′46″E	Upload Photo
9/2/068/0028	Mons Ruber Estate Wine tasting room, Rietvlei, Oudtshoorn District			Oudtshoorn	Provincial Heritage Site	33°30′46″S 22°29′48″E	Upload Photo
9/2/068/0029	Municipal Cemetery, Oudtshoorn		Oudtshoorn	Oudtshoorn	National Monument	33°35′19″S 22°13′13″E	Upload Photo
9/2/068/0030	Oude Muragie, Oudtshoorn District		Oudtshoorn	Oudtshoorn		33°27′16″S 22°26′16″E	Upload Photo
9/2/068/0031	Saffraanrivier, Oudtshoorn District		Oudtshoorn	Oudtshoorn		33°44′11″S 22°02′13″E	Upload Photo
9/2/068/0032	Dutch Reformed Church Parsonage, High Street, Oudtshoorn	This parsonage is a double-storeyed building which was constructed in the Victorian style and completed in 1882. Type of site: Parsonage. Current use: Parsonage.	Oudtshoorn	Oudtshoorn	Provincial Heritage Site	33°36′25″S 22°02′40″E	Upload Photo
9/2/068/0033	Queen's Hotel, Baron van Rheede Street, Oudtshoorn		Oudtshoorn	Oudtshoorn	National Monument	33°35′29″S 22°12′09″E	Upload Photo
9/2/068/0034	Boomplaas Cave, Cango Valley, Oudtshoorn District		Oudtshoorn	Oudtshoorn			Upload Photo
9/2/068/0035	Nooitgedacht Fossil Site, Cango Valley, Oudtshoorn District		Oudtshoorn	Oudtshoorn			Upload Photo
9/2/068/0036	OUDTSHOORN MAGISTERIAL DISTRICT, GENERAL		Oudtshoorn	Oudtshoorn			Upload Photo
9/2/072/0001	Kersefontein, Piketberg District		Piketberg	Piketberg		32°54′14″S 18°19′56″E	
9/2/072/0001-001	Farmstead, Kersefontein, Piketberg District	Kersefontein came into the possession of the Melck family in 1770. Successive generations built and maintained the gracious homestead and outbuildings. Type of site: Farmstead		Piketberg	Provincial Heritage Site	32°54′05″S 18°46′02″E	Kersefontein came into the possession of the Melck family in 1770. Successive generations built and maintained the gracious homestead and outbuildings. Type of site: Farmstead
9/2/072/0001-002	Outbuildings, Kersefontein, Piketberg District	Type of site: Outbuilding		Piketberg	Provincial Heritage Site	32°54′00″S 18°45′58″E	Type of site: Outbuilding
9/2/072/0002	Northern terminal of Maclear's Arc of Meridian, Klipfontein, Piketberg District	Type of site: Survey beacon Drive out of Auroa on the road to Redelinghuys. The site is situated on the left side of the road about 2 kilometres from the town. There is a cairn marking the site.		Piketberg	Provincial Heritage Site	32°53′59″S 18°46′00″E	Type of site: Survey beacon Drive out of Auroa on the road to Redelinghuys. The site is situated on the left side of the road about 2 kilometres from the town. There is a cairn marking the site.
9/2/072/0003	Banghoek Farm, Piketberg District		Piketberg	Piketberg	National Monument		Upload Photo
9/2/072/0004	Goedverwacht/Wittewater Mission Complex, Piketberg District	Type of site: Mission Station		Piketberg	Provincial Heritage Site	33°13′40″S 21°51′25″E	Type of site: Mission Station
9/2/072/0005	Verlorevlei, Elands Bay, Piketberg District		Elands Bay	Piketberg	National Monument	32°20′01″S 18°25′06″E	Upload Photo
9/2/072/0006	Fisherman's Cottage, Alana Avenue, Velddrif, Piketberg District		Velddrif	Piketberg			Upload Photo
9/2/072/0007	Old Municipal Cemetery, Piketberg		Piketberg	Piketberg			Upload Photo
9/2/072/0008	Fisherman's Cottage, 71 Voortrekker Road, Velddrif, Piketberg		Velddrif	Piketberg		32°54′50″S 18°45′19″E	Upload Photo
9/2/072/0009	PIKETBERG MUNICIPAL AREA, GENERAL		Piketberg	Piketberg			Upload Photo
9/2/072/0010	Dutch Reformed Church, Church Street, Piketberg	Very fine Cape Gothic dressed stone church with white plaster detailing. Decoration is unusually 'spiky'. This church in the Neo-Gothic style, was designed by Carl Otto Hager. The foundation stone was laid on 12 August 1880. The building was completed early in 1882 and was officially inaugurated on 28 April. Type of site: Church; Current use: Church : Dutch Reformed.	Piketberg	Piketberg	Provincial Heritage Site	32°54′09″S 18°45′55″E	Very fine Cape Gothic dressed stone church with white plaster detailing. Decoration is unusually 'spiky'. This church in the Neo-Gothic style, was designed by Carl Otto Hager. The foundation stone was laid on 12 August 1880. The building was completed early in 1882 and was officially inaugurated on 28 April. Type of site: Church Current use: Church : Dutch Reformed. Media related to Dutch Reformed Church, Piketberg at Wikimedia Commons
9/2/072/0011	Rock painting of galleon, Heidedal Farm, Porterville		Porterville	Piketberg	National Monument		Upload Photo
9/2/072/0012	Woburn Lodge, 12 Waterkant Street, Piketberg	Type of site: House Current use: House. This is the only surviving thatched pioneer-type house in central Piketberg. It retains its original appearance to a great extent and is associated with the early history of the town as it once belonged to the first Magistrate of Piketberg.	Piketberg	Piketberg	Provincial Heritage Site	32°54′02″S 18°45′18″E	Upload Photo
9/2/072/0013	Archaeological excavations, Piketberg		Piketberg	Piketberg	National Monument		Upload Photo
9/2/072/0014	Deze Hoek, Piketberg District		Piketberg	Piketberg		32°51′48″S 18°44′53″E	Upload Photo
9/2/072/0014/001	Watermill, Deze Hoek, Piketberg District	Small mill structure. Stone with mud plaster, under thatch. Overshot wooden wheel. All workings present. This watermill was erected during the years 1863-1864 by Jacob Johannes Eksteen, the then owner of Deze Hoek. The impressive overshot mill wheel was manufactured during the same period by Jan Dommisse. Type of site: Water Mill; Previous use: Mill. Current use: Disused. Leave Piketberg on Versveldpass road. 2.9 km along road.		Piketberg	Provincial Heritage Site	32°51′50″S 18°44′55″E	Upload Photo
9/2/072/0015	St Helenafontein, Piketberg District	The original St Helenafontein farmhouse was presumably erected in 1835 by Pierre Rocher. In the 1880s a second storey replaced the pitched roof and the building was converted to the Georgian style. Type of site: House. Current use: Residential.		Piketberg	Provincial Heritage Site	32°36′S 18°21′E	Upload Photo
9/2/072/0016	Koopmanskraal, Piketberg District	The Koopmanskraal homestead, together with the nearby outbuilding in which a horse-mill is located, forms a unique thatched complex that dates from the 19th century. The ground plan of the homestead, which is in the shape of a rough crucifix, is more common in ecclesiastical than in domestic architecture. The building was accidentally destroyed by a fire in 1993. Type of site: House; Previous use: Residential. Current use: Destroyed.		Piketberg	Provincial Heritage Site	32°32′00″S 18°39′40″E	Upload Photo
9/2/072/0017	Museum, Porterville	Current use: Museum.	Porterville	Piketberg	Provincial Heritage Site	33°00′46″S 18°59′41″E	Current use: Museum.
9/2/072/0018	Fishhouse Museum, Velddrif, Piketberg District		Piketberg	Piketberg	National Monument		Upload Photo
9/2/072/0019	16-18 Main Street, Piketberg		Piketberg	Piketberg		32°54′24″S 18°45′20″E	Upload Photo
9/2/072/0020	Klaarefontein, Piketberg District		Piketberg	Piketberg			
9/2/072/0021	Dunn's Castle, Piketberg District		Piketberg	Piketberg		32°54′50″S 18°45′27″E	Upload Photo
9/2/072/0022	VELDDRIF MUNICIPAL AREA, GENERAL		Piketberg	Piketberg	Pending Declaration		Upload Photo
9/2/072/0023	PIKETBERG MAGISTERIAL DISTRICT, GENERAL		Velddrif	Piketberg			Upload Photo
9/2/072/0024	Doornboom Farmstead, Piketberg District		Piketberg	Piketberg			Upload Photo
9/2/072/0025	DWARSKERSBOS GENERAL, PIKETBERG DISTRICT		Piketberg	Piketberg			Upload Photo
9/2/072/0026	PORTERVILLE MUNICIPAL AREA, GENERAL		Porterville	Picketberg			Upload Photo
9/2/076/0001	2 Church Street, Prince Albert		Prince Albert	Prince Albert		33°13′57″S 22°01′53″E	Upload Photo
9/2/076/0002	Homestead, Baviaanskloof, Prince Albert District	This farmhouse has fine gables, including a front gable which bears the date 1837. The house itself, together with its stone step in front, is a good example of Boland farm culture in the Karoo. Type of site: House This farmhouse has fine gables, including a front gable which bears the date 1837. The house itself, together with its stone step in front, is a good example of Boland farm culture in the Karoo.		Prince Albert	Provincial Heritage Site	33°14′13″S 21°50′55″E	Upload Photo
9/2/076/0004	Gamkaskloof, Prince Albert District	Type of site: Settlement		Prince Albert	Provincial Heritage Site	33°14′46″S 22°02′39″E	Upload Photo
9/2/076/0005	Historical Graveyard, John Nutt se Draai, Prince Albert		Prince Albert	Prince Albert	Pending Declaration		Upload Photo
9/2/076/0006	Erf 193, Swartberg Hotel, Church Street, Prince Albert	Type of site: Hotel Current use: Hotel.	Prince Albert	Prince Albert	Provincial Heritage Site	33°13′23″S 22°01′46″E	Type of site: Hotel Current use: Hotel. Media related to Swartberg Hotel, Prince Albert at Wikimedia Commons
9/2/076/0007	Scholtzkloof, Prince Albert District		Prince Albert	Prince Albert	National Monument		Upload Photo
9/2/076/0008	Albert's Mill, Christina de Wit Street, Prince Albert	Prince Albert lies at the foot of the Swartberg Pass, 72 km from Oudtshoorn and 45 km from the national road between Laingsburg and Beaufort West. It is an interesting old town, with its whitewashed gabled houses which strongly reflect the characteristic architecture of the Cape. Type of site: Mill. Previous use: Mill. This old watermill was built by HJ Botes in 1850 and is still in working order. Situated at the foot of the Swart Berg Pass it is an outstanding feature on this popular tourist route.	Prince Albert	Prince Albert	Provincial Heritage Site	33°12′40″S 22°01′17″E	Prince Albert lies at the foot of the Swartberg Pass, 72 km from Oudtshoorn and 45 km from the national road between Laingsburg and Beaufort West. It is an interesting old town, with its whitewashed gabled houses which strongly reflect the characteristic architecture of the Cape. Type of site: Mill. Previous use: Mill. This old watermill was built by HJ Botes in 1850 and is still in working order. Situated at the foot of the Swart Berg Pass it is an outstanding feature on this popular tourist route. Media related to Albert's Mill at Wikimedia Commons
9/2/076/0009	Witbergie Rockshelter, Tierberg, Prince Albert District		Prince Albert	Prince Albert	National Monument	33°08′18″S 22°15′08″E	Upload Photo
9/2/076/0010	Farm Klein Sleutelfontein (Part of Vrolikheid), Prince Albert District		Prince Albert	Prince Albert			Upload Photo
9/2/076/0011	PRINCE ALBERT MUNICIPAL AREA, GENERAL		Prince Albert	Prince Albert			Upload Photo
9/2/076/0012	Krige House, 24 Church Street, Prince Albert		Prince Albert	Prince Albert		33°13′34″S 22°01′49″E	Upload Photo
9/2/076/0013	Swartberg Pass, Prince Albert District		Prince Albert	Prince Albert	Pending Declaration	33°21′08″S 22°02′47″E	Upload Photo
9/2/076/0014	Old Mission Church Parsonage, 5 Church Street, Prince Albert	This cottage, with its typical Prince Albert front sable, was erected in 1858 by Helmuth Luttig. It was occupied by the Luttig family until 1907 when the property was purchased by the Dutch Reformed Church and converted into a mission parsonage. Type of site: Parsonage. Previous use: Parsonage. Current use: Residential.	Prince Albert	Prince Albert	Provincial Heritage Site	33°13′34″S 22°01′49″E	Upload Photo
9/2/076/0015	Homestead, Vrolikheid, Prince Albert District	Type of site: Farmstead Current use: Residential. This historic Cape Dutch house, with its elements of Karoo architecture, bears the date 1821 on its front gable. The farmhouse forms an important link with the history of the district and the front gable served as a prototype for other gables in the vicinity.		Prince Albert	Provincial Heritage Site	33°13′40″S 21°51′25″E	Upload Photo
9/2/076/0016	Dutch Reformed Church, Zeekoegat, Prince Albert District	This church was erected in 1906 free of charge by Mr F. Oosthuizen of Zwartkraal, who was also the owner of Zeekoegat. The building was inaugurated on 23 February 1907 by Rev. D. Wilcocks of Prince Albert and Rev. Albertyn of Willowmore. Type of site: Church. Current use: Church : Dutch Reformed.		Prince Albert	Provincial Heritage Site	33°13′40″S 21°51′25″E	Upload Photo
9/2/076/0017	57 Church Street, Prince Albert	Type of site: House. Current use: Residential.	Prince Albert	Prince Albert	Provincial Heritage Site	33°13′33″S 22°01′49″E	Type of site: House. Current use: Residential.
9/2/076/0018	Bona Vista, 7 Parsonage Street cnr de Beer Street, Prince Albert	Type of site: House. Current use: House.	Prince Albert	Prince Albert	Provincial Heritage Site	33°13′40″S 22°01′50″E	Upload Photo
9/2/076/0019	Dutch Reformed Church and Hall, Prince Albert	Type of site: Church	Prince Albert	Prince Albert	Provincial Heritage Site	33°13′31″S 22°01′48″E	Type of site: Church Media related to Dutch Reformed Church, Prince Albert at Wikimedia Commons
9/2/076/0019-001	Dutch Reformed Church, Church Street, Prince Albert	Type of site: Church	Prince Albert	Prince Albert	Provincial Heritage Site	33°13′15″S 22°01′45″E	Type of site: Church
9/2/076/0019-002	Dutch Reformed Church Hall, Market Street cnr Parsonage Street, Prince Albert	Type of site: Church Hall	Prince Albert	Prince Albert	Provincial Heritage Site	33°13′41″S 22°01′47″E	Type of site: Church Hall
9/2/076/0020	Dutch Reformed Church Parsonage, 2 Parsonage Street, Prince Albert	Type of site: House. Current use: Parsonage.	Prince Albert	Prince Albert	Provincial Heritage Site	33°13′38″S 22°01′45″E	Type of site: House. Current use: Parsonage.
9/2/076/0021	15 Church Street, Prince Albert	Type of site: House. Current use: Residential.	Prince Albert	Prince Albert	Provincial Heritage Site	33°13′34″S 22°01′49″E	Type of site: House. Current use: Residential.
9/2/076/0022	20 Church Street, cnr Jan Louw Street, Prince Albert	Type of site: House. Current use: Residential.	Prince Albert	Prince Albert	Provincial Heritage Site	33°13′48″S 22°01′53″E	Upload Photo
9/2/076/0023	Military Graves, Leeu-Gamka, Prince Albert District		Prince Albert	Prince Albert	National Monument		Upload Photo
9/2/076/0024	Conservation area, Prince Albert		Prince Albert	Prince Albert			Upload Photo
9/2/076/0025	Anglican Church Cemetery, Klaarstroom, Prince Albert District		Prince Albert	Prince Albert			Upload Photo
9/2/076/0026	Grave of Private W Calver, Goeiemoed, Prince Albert District		Prince Albert	Prince Albert			Upload Photo
9/2/076/0027	Erf 1513, Church Street, Prince Albert		Prince Albert	Prince Albert			Upload Photo
9/2/076/0028	Klaarstroom General, Prince Albert District		Prince Albert	Prince Albert			Upload Photo
9/2/076/0029	26 Church Street cnr Parsonage Street, Prince Albert		Prince Albert	Prince Albert	Provincial Heritage Site	33°13′42″S 22°01′51″E	
9/2/076/0030	St John the Baptist Anglican Church, Bank Street, Prince Albert	Type of site: Church	Prince Albert	Prince Albert	Provincial Heritage Site	33°13′35″S 22°01′46″E	Type of site: Church Media related to St John the Baptist Anglican Church, Prince Albert at Wikimedia Commons
9/2/076/0031	Dennehof, Christina de Wit Street, Prince Albert		Prince Albert	Prince Albert	Provincial Heritage Site	33°12′39″S 22°01′17″E	Upload Photo
9/2/076/0032	PRINCE ALBERT MAGISTERIAL DISTRICT, GENERAL		Prince Albert	Prince Albert			Upload Photo
9/2/076/0033	Grave of Lt. Klue, Farm Riemhoogte, Prince Albert District		Prince Albert	Prince Albert			Upload Photo
9/2/096/0001	UNIONDALE MAGISTERIAL DISTRICT, GENERAL		Uniondale	Uniondale	National Monument		Upload Photo
9/2/096/0002	UNIONDALE MUNICIPAL AREA, GENERAL		Uniondale	Uniondale			Upload Photo
9/2/096/0003	HAARLEM, UNIONDALE DISTRICT, GENERAL		Uniondale	Uniondale			Upload Photo
9/2/096/0004	Dutch Reformed Church, Kerk Street, Uniondale		Uniondale	Uniondale		33°39′29″S 23°07′37″E	Upload Photo
9/2/096/0005	Old Congregational Church complex, Voortrekker Street, Uniondale	Type of site: Church Complex. Current use: Disused.	Uniondale	Uniondale	Provincial Heritage Site	33°39′08″S 23°08′05″E	Type of site: Church Complex. Current use: Disused. Media related to Old Congregational Church complex, Uniondale at Wikimedia Commons
9/2/096/0006	Evangelical Lutheran Church, Haarlem	The historic Lutheran Mission Church, built in the shape of a Greek crucifix, was erected at Haarlem between 1877and 1880 and is one of the few churches in South Africa built in this traditional style. Type of site: Church; Current use: Religious.	Haarlem	Uniondale	Provincial Heritage Site	33°44′01″S 23°20′21″E	The historic Lutheran Mission Church, built in the shape of a Greek crucifix, was erected at Haarlem between 1877and 1880 and is one of the few churches in South Africa built in this traditional style. Type of site: Church Current use: Religious.
9/2/096/0007	Old Residency, 6 Victoria Street, Uniondale	The residency is typical of the late nineteenth century house architecture of Uniondale. This house, of which the floors, loft, crib and stable are of yellow-wood, undoubtedly contributes to the historic character of this town. Type of site: Residency; Current use: House.	Uniondale	Uniondale	Provincial Heritage Site	33°39′19″S 23°07′34″E	Upload Photo
9/2/096/0008	Old Dutch Reformed Church, Voortrekker Street, Uniondale	This church was erected in 1862, the style being predominantly neo-Gothic. It is closely connected with the history of the town. Type of site: Church; Previous use: Church. Current use: Disused.	Uniondale	Uniondale	Provincial Heritage Site	33°39′08″S 23°08′05″E	This church was erected in 1862, the style being predominantly neo-Gothic. It is closely connected with the history of the town. Type of site: Church Previous use: Church. Current use: Disused.
9/2/096/0009	Old Watermills, Haarlem	Type of site: Water Mill. Previous use: Mill.	Haarlem	Uniondale	Provisional Protection	33°44′45″S 23°20′26″E	Upload Photo
9/2/096/0010	Anglican Cemetery, Uniondale		Uniondale	Uniondale	Provincial Monument	33°39′22″S 23°07′42″E	Upload Photo
9/2/096/0011	Prince Alfred's Pass, Uniondale District		Uniondale	Uniondale		33°50′00″S 23°10′00″E	Upload Photo
9/2/096/0012	Old Synagogue, Victoria Street, Uniondale		Uniondale	Uniondale	Pending Declaration	33°39′22″S 23°07′30″E	Upload Photo
9/2/096/0013	Police Station and Magistrate's Court, 51 Voortrekker Street, Uniondale		Uniondale	Uniondale		33°39′26″S 23°07′33″E	Upload Photo
9/2/096/0014	Standard Bank, 31 Voortrekker Street, Uniondale		Uniondale	Uniondale		33°39′21″S 23°07′44″E	Upload Photo
9/2/096/0015	All Saints Church 33 Voortrekker Street, Uniondale	Type of site: Church. Current use: Church : Anglican.	Uniondale	Uniondale	Provincial Heritage Site	33°39′22″S 23°07′42″E	Type of site: Church. Current use: Church : Anglican.
9/2/096/0016	35 Voortrekker Street, Uniondale		Uniondale	Uniondale		33°39′25″S 23°07′34″E	Upload Photo
9/2/096/0017	26 Victoria Street, Uniondale	Current use: Office.	Uniondale	Uniondale	Provincial Heritage Site	33°39′19″S 23°07′34″E	Current use: Office.
9/2/096/0018	28 Victoria Street, Uniondale	Type of site: House. Current use: House.	Uniondale	Uniondale	Provincial Heritage Site	33°39′19″S 23°07′34″E	Type of site: House. Current use: House.
9/2/096/0019	14 Victoria Street, Uniondale		Uniondale	Uniondale	National Monument	33°39′20″S 23°07′33″E	Upload Photo
9/2/096/0020	2 Victoria Street, Uniondale		Uniondale	Uniondale		33°39′14″S 23°07′43″E	Upload Photo
9/2/096/0021	18 Victoria Street, Uniondale		Uniondale	Uniondale		33°39′16″S 23°07′38″E	Upload Photo
9/2/096/0022	Anglo-Boer War blockhouse, Uniondale	This historic fort was erected during the Anglo-Boer War by the British military authorities and the so-called Town Guards for the defence of Uniondale. Four similar structures were built at the time at Uniondale. These fortifications differed considerably Type of site: Blockhouse; Previous use: Fortification.	Uniondale	Uniondale	Provincial Heritage Site	33°38′55″S 23°08′18″E	This historic fort was erected during the Anglo-Boer War by the British military authorities and the so-called Town Guards for the defence of Uniondale. Four similar structures were built at the time at Uniondale. These fortifications differed considerably Type of site: Blockhouse Previous use: Fortification.
9/2/096/0023	Watermill, Uniondale	The structure consists of a double-storeyed building and the mill's wooden wheel is of the undershot type. This water mill was built in 1854 by J. A.van Rooyen and is the only remaining water mill in Uniondale. Type of site: Water Mill; Previous use: Mill. Current use: Museum.	Uniondale	Uniondale	Provincial Heritage Site	33°38′55″S 23°08′18″E	The structure consists of a double-storeyed building and the mill's wooden wheel is of the undershot type. This water mill was built in 1854 by J. A.van Rooyen and is the only remaining water mill in Uniondale. Type of site: Water Mill Previous use: Mill. Current use: Museum. Media related to Watermill, Uniondale at Wikimedia Commons
9/2/096/0024	Anhalt-Schmidt Parsonage, Burg Street, Haarlem		Haarlem	Uniondale	National Monument		Upload Photo
9/2/097/0001	Rock Paintings, Wiedou, Vanrhynsdorp District		Vanrhynsdorp	Vanrhynsdorp			Upload Photo
9/2/097/0002	Vondeling, Vanrhynsdorp District		Vanrhynsdorp	Vanrhynsdorp			Upload Photo
9/2/097/0003	Heerenlogement Cave, Olifantsrivier, Van Rhynsdorp District	see 9/2/102/0002 & 9/2/022/0037 Heerenlogement			Provincial Heritage Site		see 9/2/102/0002 & 9/2/022/0037 Heerenlogement
9/2/097/0004	44 Voortrekker Street, Vanrhynsdorp		Vanrhynsdorp	Vanrhynsdorp		31°36′34″S 18°44′10″E	Upload Photo
9/2/097/0005	VANRHYNSDORP MUNICIPAL AREA, GENERAL		Vanrhynsdorp	Vanrhynsdorp			Upload Photo
9/2/097/0006	St Theresa Roman Catholic Church, Vanrhynsdorp		Vanrhynsdorp	Vanrhynsdorp			Upload Photo
9/2/097/0007	Municipal cemetery, Vanrhynsdorp		Vanrhynsdorp	Vanrhynsdorp			Upload Photo
9/2/097/0008	VANRHYNSDORP MAGISTERIAL DISTRICT, GENERAL		Vanrhynsdorp	Vanrhynsdorp			Upload Photo
9/2/097/0009	Rock Paintings, Vanrhynsdorp District		Vanrhynsdorp	Vanrhynsdorp			Upload Photo
9/2/097/0010	Van Rhyn Museum, Van Riebeeck Street, Vanrhynsdorp		Vanrhynsdorp	Vanrhynsdorp		31°36′33″S 18°44′09″E	Upload Photo
9/2/097/0011	Anglo-Boer War Fort, Aties 308, Vanrhynsdorp District	Type of site: Military		Vanrhynsdorp	Provincial Heritage Site	31°40′31″S 18°41′14″E	Upload Photo
9/2/097/0012	Grave of Lemuel Colyn, Farm Onder-Aties, Vanrhynsdorp Dist		Vanrhynsdorp	Vanrhynsdorp			Upload Photo
9/2/097/0013	Windhoek Farm, Klawer, Vanrhynsdorp Dist		Klawer	Vanrhynsdorp			Upload Photo
9/2/101/0001	VREDENBURG MUNICIPAL AREA, GENERAL		Vredenburg	Vredenburg			Upload Photo
9/2/101/0002	Grave of gunner Jeffries, Abandoned Cemetery, Saldanha, Vredenburg		Vredenburg	Vredenburg			Upload Photo
9/2/101/0003	ST HELENA BAY, GENERAL		Vredenburg	Vredenburg			Upload Photo
9/2/101/0004	Hoedjiespunt, Saldanha, Vredenburg District		Vredenburg	Vredenburg			Upload Photo
9/2/101/0005	Besterskraal farm, Varswater Bay, Vredenburg District		Vredenburg	Vredenburg	National Monument		Upload Photo
9/2/101/0006	VREDENBURG MAGISTERIAL DISTRICT, GENERAL		Vredenburg	Vredenburg			Upload Photo
9/2/101/0006/1	Coastal Archaeology, Vredenburg Magisterial District		Vredenburg	Vredenburg			Upload Photo
9/2/101/0006/2	Varswaterbaai, Vredenburg District		Vredenburg	Vredenburg			Upload Photo
9/2/101/0007	Fishermen's cottages, Saldanha	These oval-shaped cottages were built by George Goode Busch in 1918 and are the only remaining fishermen's cottages of this type in the vicinity of Saldanha.	Saldanha	Vredenburg	Provincial Heritage Site	33°00′18″S 17°56′39″E	These oval-shaped cottages were built by George Goode Busch in 1918 and are the only remaining fishermen's cottages of this type in the vicinity of Saldanha.
9/2/101/0008	Die Krans rock shelter, Vredenburg District		Vredenburg	Vredenburg	National Monument		Upload Photo
9/2/101/0010	Grave of Lt Simeon W Cummings, Kliprug, Vredenbrug District		Vredenburg	Vredenburg			
9/2/101/0011	Varswaterbaai, Vredenburg		Vredenburg	Vredenburg			Upload Photo
9/2/101/0012	Kasteelberg, Vredenburg District		Vredenburg	Vredenburg		33°22′15″S 18°51′28″E	Upload Photo
9/2/101/0013	PATERNOSTER LOCAL AREA, GENERAL		Vredenburg	Vredenburg			Upload Photo
9/2/101/0014	SALDANHA MUNICIPAL AREA, GENERAL		Vredenburg	Vredenburg			Upload Photo
9/2/101/0015	Alpha Saldanha Cement Project, Saldanha		Saldahna	Vredenburg			Upload Photo
9/2/101/0016	Cape Columbine Lighthouse, Castle rock, Paternoster, Vredenburg		Vredenburg	Vredenburg			Upload Photo
9/2/102/0001	VREDENDAL MAGISTERIAL DISTRICT, GENERAL		Vredendal	Vredendal			Upload Photo
9/2/102/0002	Heerenlogement Cave, Graafwater, Vredendal Dist (See 9/2/097/0003; 9/2/022/0037)		Vredendal	Vredendal		31°57′42″S 18°32′59″E	Upload Photo
9/2/102/0003	Bergh Fountain, Klipfontein, Vredendal District	On a rock in this area the name of O Slotsbo, IT Rhenius and O Bergh are engraved. On 30 October 1682, a party under the leadership of Oloff Bergh left the Castle to investigate the area from which the Namakwas brought samples of copper-ore the previous year. Bergh engraved his name and 1682 on the rock. Type of site: Spring; Current use: Tourist attraction. On 30 October 1682, a party under the leadership of Oloff Bergh left the Castle to investigate the area from which the Namakwas brought samples of copper-ore		Vredendal	Provincial Heritage Site	32°00′20″S 18°31′00″E	Upload Photo
9/2/102/0004	Anglo-Boer War blockhouses, Klipfontein, Vredendal District		Vredendal	Vredendal			Upload Photo
9/2/102/0005	Melkboomsdrift 184, Vredendal District	Dwelling & agricultural building. Type of site: House The buildings at Melkboomsdrift represent the only remaining pioneer farmstead in the area.		Vredendal	Register	33°13′40″S 21°51′25″E	Upload Photo
9/2/102/0006	Jerusalom, Farm Hollebaks, Vredendal District		Vredendal	Vredendal			Upload Photo
9/2/102/0007	Brand se baai, Vredendal District		Vredendal	Vredendal			Upload Photo
9/2/102/0008	Van Zyl House, Vredendal		Vredendal	Vredendal			Upload Photo
9/2/102/0009	Vlermuisklip, Lutzville, Vredendal District		Vredendal	Vredendal		31°33′28″S 18°20′30″E	Upload Photo
9/2/102/0010	Fryer Cemetery, Farm 270, Strandfontein, Vredendal District	Type of site: Cemetery. This cemetery is a typical example of vernacular Strandfontein construction, having been built of slate stone by the local inhabitants. The Fryers of Clanwilliams, came to settle and farm in this area and were very involved in establishing a school.		Vredendal	Register	31°45′19″S 18°14′02″E	Upload Photo
9/2/102/0011	Meerhoff's Castle, Vredendal Dist		Vredendal	Vredendal			Upload Photo
9/2/102/0012	Corrugated iron Fort and Dovecote, Farm Graafwater		Vredendal	Vredendal			Upload Photo
9/2/102/0013	EBENHAESER HISTORICAL RURAL SETTLEMENT		Ebenhaeser	Vredendal			Upload Photo
9/2/102/0014	LUTZVILLE MUNICIPAL AREA GENERAL		Lutzville	Vredendal			Upload Photo
9/2/102/0015	KOEKENAAP LOCAL AREA GENERAL, Vredendal District		Koekenaap	Vredendal			Upload Photo
9/2/102/0016	PAPENDORP LOCAL AREA GENERAL, Vredendal District		Papendorp	Vredendal			Upload Photo
9/2/106/0001	Doolhof, Wellington District		Wellington	Wellington		33°37′34″S 19°05′02″E	Upload Photo
9/2/106/0002	Groenberg School, Wellington District	The school was built in the sixties of the 19th century. C. P. Hoogenhout, who played an important part in the first phase of the Afrikaans Language Movement, was the teacher there from 3 August 1874 until the beginning of the 20th century. Type of site: School; Previous use: School. Current use: School.	Paarl	Wellington	Provincial Heritage Site	33°40′04″S 18°59′14″E	Upload Photo
9/2/106/0003	Anglo-Boer War blockhouse, Wellington District	Some of the historical monuments in the Berg River Valley link the history of the area with that of the far interior of the country. This is especially true of the blockhouse on the farm Versailles just north of Welling ton railway station. It guarded the railway bridge over the Berg River and is reached from the road to Hermon.	Paarl	Wellington	Provincial Heritage Site	33°37′54″S 18°59′28″E	Some of the historical monuments in the Berg River Valley link the history of the area with that of the far interior of the country. This is especially true of the blockhouse on the farm Versailles just north of Welling ton railway station. It guarded the railway bridge over the Berg River and is reached from the road to Hermon.
9/2/106/0004	Dutch Reformed Church Complex, Main Street, Wellington	The cornerstone of the original church building was laid on 27 June 1838 and the building was completed in 1840. In 1861 it was converted into a crucifix church by the addition of two wings. The prominent tower was designed by C. Freeman and H.J. Jones. Type of site: Church Complex	Wellington	Wellington	Provincial Heritage Site	33°38′07″S 18°59′46″E	The cornerstone of the original church building was laid on 27 June 1838 and the building was completed in 1840. In 1861 it was converted into a crucifix church by the addition of two wings. The prominent tower was designed by C. Freeman and H.J. Jones. Type of site: Church Complex
9/2/106/0005	Old Market Hall, Main Street, Wellington	The cornerstone of the original church building was laid on 27 June 1838 and the building was completed in 1840. In 1861 it was converted into a crucifix church by the addition of two wings. The prominent tower was designed by C. Freeman and H.J. Jones. Type of site: Market Hall	Wellington	Wellington	Provincial Heritage Site	33°38′07″S 18°59′46″E	Upload Photo
9/2/106/0006	Welvanpas, Wellington District		Wellington	Wellington	National Monument		Upload Photo
9/2/106/0007	Bainskloof, Wellington District	Andrew Geddes Bain discovered the kloof in 1846 when the Colonial Secretary, John Montagu, was searching for a direct route through the mountains between Cape Town and the new Michell's Pass. Montagu accepted the route for his highway and named it Bain's Kloof. Bain commenced construction work in February 1849 and the pass was opened on 12 September 1853 by the Chairman of the Central Road Board, P. B. Borcherds. Type of site: Pass		Wellington	Provincial Heritage Site	33°13′40″S 21°51′25″E	Andrew Geddes Bain discovered the kloof in 1846 when the Colonial Secretary, John Montagu, was searching for a direct route through the mountains between Cape Town and the new Michell's Pass. Montagu accepted the route for his highway and named it Bain's Kloof. Bain commenced construction work in February 1849 and the pass was opened on 12 September 1853 by the Chairman of the Central Road Board, P. B. Borcherds. Type of site: Pass Media related to Bain's Kloof Pass at Wikimedia Commons
9/2/106/0008	Rem. of Farm 1364, Wellington District		Wellington	Wellington	National Monument		Upload Photo
9/2/106/0009	WELLINGTON MUNICIPAL AREA, GENERAL		Wellington	Wellington			Upload Photo
9/2/106/0010	Anglo-Boer War blockhouse, Hermon, Wellington District		Hermon	Wellington			Upload Photo
9/2/106/0011	20 Bain Street, Wellington	This predominantly Victorian house dates from about 1855 and originally served as the first school building in Wellington.	Wellington	Wellington	Provincial Heritage Site	33°38′32″S 19°00′30″E	This predominantly Victorian house dates from about 1855 and originally served as the first school building in Wellington.
9/2/106/0012	Ouma Granny's House, 37 Fountain Street, Wellington	Type of site: House The property was first granted to P B Marchant in 1876. It is now a museum. The building is an intact example of Victorian architecture of the area and houses the valuable C P Hoogenhout collection.	Wellington	Wellington	Provincial Heritage Site	33°38′00″S 18°59′00″E	Type of site: House The property was first granted to P B Marchant in 1876. It is now a museum. The building is an intact example of Victorian architecture of the area and houses the valuable C P Hoogenhout collection.
9/2/106/0013	Mission Church, Bovlei, Wellington District	The road to Bovlei branches off the Bains Kloof road just beyond Wellington. Three kilometres along this road, on the left, stands the group of buildings of the mission station known as the Dutch Reformed Mission of Wagenmakersvallei. The building which, like other missionary churches of the time, was known as the "Gesticht" (Institute) or "Oefeninghuis", was rectangular in shape and had a thatched roof and earth floor. The two side gables were added during the 1860s and inaugurated on 21 October 1869. This gave the building the shape of a T, the vertical stroke of the T being the original church with the gable bearing the date 1820. The thatched roof was replaced by corrugated iron in 1896 and in 1927 a wooden floor was built into the church. Only three church buildings and only one mission church in South Africa are older than the Wagenmakersvallei Church. The first man to do missionary work amongst the slaves and coloured people in the Wagenmakersvallei was Jan Jacob van Zulch, a convert of the well-known Cape Town minister, the Rev. Helperus Ritzema van Lier. He started this work here in 1796 and built a meeting house or "oefeninghuis" somewhere in the vicinity. In 1800 Van Zulch had to give up the work because of ill health, but it was continued by James Read, the Rev, van der Lingen and Bastiaan Tromp successively, all of them working under the aegis of the Suid-Afrikaanse Sendinggenootskap of Cape Town. Type of site: Church; Current use: Church : Dutch Reformed Mission. This fine church is one of the oldest mission churches in South Africa. It was consecrated in 1820. The Rev. Isaac Bisseux ministered to the congregation from 1829 for about 50 years.		Wellington	Provincial Heritage Site	33°13′40″S 21°51′25″E	Upload Photo
9/2/106/0014	Twist Niet, 31 Burg Street, Wellington	In Berg Street, almost in the heart of Wellington, stands an old Cape-Dutch T-shaped house, round which the town, as it were, originated. In the course of time it has lost much of its glory. The thatched roof has been replaced by one of galvanised iron and the front and back gable did not remain intact in the process. Type of site: House. Current use: House.	Wellington	Wellington	Provincial Heritage Site	33°38′38″S 19°00′29″E	In Berg Street, almost in the heart of Wellington, stands an old Cape-Dutch T-shaped house, round which the town, as it were, originated. In the course of time it has lost much of its glory. The thatched roof has been replaced by one of galvanised iron and the front and back gable did not remain intact in the process. Type of site: House. Current use: House.
9/2/106/0015	Clairvaux, Wellington	This house was from 1892 up to his death on 17 January 1917, the dwelling of the well-known theologian, Dr Andrew Murray. Here Andrew Murray wrote many of his theological books. Type of site: Farm	Wellington	Wellington	Provincial Heritage Site	33°38′00″S 18°59′00″E	Upload Photo
9/2/106/0016	34 Bain Street, Wellington	These two erven originally formed part of the farm Champagne, which was granted to the Huguenot Hercule Verdeaux in 1699. The dwellings, one of which dates from the 1830s and the other from the 1850s, were originally in the Cape Dutch style.	Wellington	Wellington	Provincial Heritage Site	33°38′27″S 19°00′42″E	These two erven originally formed part of the farm Champagne, which was granted to the Huguenot Hercule Verdeaux in 1699. The dwellings, one of which dates from the 1830s and the other from the 1850s, were originally in the Cape Dutch style.
9/2/106/0017	35 Bain Street, Wellington	These two erven originally formed part of the farm Champagne, which was granted to the Huguenot Hercule Verdeaux in 1699. The dwellings, one of which dates from the 1830s and the other from the 1850s, were originally in the Cape Dutch style.	Wellington	Wellington	Provincial Heritage Site	33°38′28″S 19°00′36″E	These two erven originally formed part of the farm Champagne, which was granted to the Huguenot Hercule Verdeaux in 1699. The dwellings, one of which dates from the 1830s and the other from the 1850s, were originally in the Cape Dutch style.
9/2/106/0018	Lady Loch Bridge, Berg River, Wellington	Type of site: Bridge. Current use: Bridge.	Wellington	Wellington	Provincial Heritage Site	33°38′23″S 19°00′47″E	Type of site: Bridge. Current use: Bridge. Media related to Lady Loch bridge at Wikimedia Commons
9/2/106/0019	Victoria Jubilee Park, Church Street, Wellington		Wellington	Wellington	National Monument		
9/2/106/0019/001	Coronation Arch, Victoria Jubilee Park, Church Street, Wellington		Wellington	Wellington	Provincial Heritage Site	33°38′18″S 19°01′08″E	
9/2/106/0020	Huguenot College Complex, Wellington	Type of site: Hostel	Wellington	Wellington	Provincial Heritage Site	33°38′26″S 19°00′35″E	Type of site: Hostel
9/2/106/0020/1	Goodnow Hall, Huguenot College, Wellington		Wellington	Wellington	National Monument	33°38′13″S 19°00′36″E	Upload Photo
9/2/106/0020/2	House Bliss, Huguenot College Complex, Wellington		Wellington	Wellington		33°38′13″S 19°00′36″E	Upload Photo
9/2/106/0021	WELLINGTON MAGISTERIAL DISTRICT, GENERAL		Wellington	Wellington			Upload Photo
9/2/106/0022	Slangrivier Homestead, Wellington District		Wellington	Wellington		33°36′39″S 19°02′14″E	Upload Photo
9/2/106/0023	"Gawie se Water", Wit River Dam, Bains Kloof, Wellington District		Bain's Kloof	Wellington		33°32′38″S 19°10′16″E	Upload Photo
9/2/106/0024	53-59 Bain Street, Wellington	These six early Cape buildings from c.1830 have a history, scale and texture which is characteristic of Wellington, and they form an aesthetically pleasing group which contributes to its sensitive old town area.	Wellington	Wellington	Register	33°38′26″S 19°00′42″E	These six early Cape buildings from c.1830 have a history, scale and texture which is characteristic of Wellington, and they form an aesthetically pleasing group which contributes to its sensitive old town area.
9/2/106/0025	Welgegund 300, Wellington District	Type of site: Farm Complex. This is a mid to late 19th century building complex, which comprises a main building and three outbuildings. The buildings are well maintained and retain much of their original joinery, architectural features and character.		Wellington	Register	33°13′40″S 21°51′25″E	Upload Photo
9/2/112/0001	MOORREESBURG DISTRICT, GENERAL		Moorreesburg	Moorreesburg			Upload Photo
9/2/112/0002	MOORREESBURG MUNICIPAL AREA, GENERAL		Moorreesburg	Moorreesburg			Upload Photo
9/2/112/0003	Carnegie Library, Church Street, Moorreesburg	Single storey stone Arts & Crafts style building with white plaster decoration to windows and corners. Doric columns to porch between two forward facing wings with triangular barge-boarded gable. Architectural style: Arts & crafts. Type of site: Library. Current use: Library.	Moorreesburg	Moorreesburg	Provincial Heritage Site	33°09′13″S 18°39′46″E	Single storey stone Arts & Crafts style building with white plaster decoration to windows and corners. Doric columns to porch between two forward facing wings with triangular barge-boarded gable. Architectural style: Arts & crafts. Type of site: Library. Current use: Library.
9/2/112/0004	ACVV offices, Retief Street, Moorreesburg	Neat and substantial late Victorian school building. This building, which was erected in 1905 by the Dutch Reformed Church at a cost of £2000. was the first true school building in the town. In 1906 the school opened with 209 scholars and a staff of five. Since 1962, after the transfer of the remaining scholars to the new school, the building has been used for community functions. Type of site: Educational; Previous use: School. Current use: Offices.	Moorreesburg	Moorreesburg	Provincial Heritage Site	33°09′08″S 18°39′42″E	Neat and substantial late Victorian school building. This building, which was erected in 1905 by the Dutch Reformed Church at a cost of £2000. was the first true school building in the town. In 1906 the school opened with 209 scholars and a staff of five. Since 1962, after the transfer of the remaining scholars to the new school, the building has been used for community functions. Type of site: Educational Previous use: School. Current use: Offices.
9/2/112/0005	Town Hall, Church Street, Moorreesburg		Moorreesburg	Moorreesburg	National Monument	33°09′12″S 18°39′46″E	Upload Photo
9/2/112/0006	Railway Station, Railway Street, Moorreesburg		Moorreesburg	Moorreesburg		33°09′08″S 18°40′13″E	Upload Photo
9/2/112/0007	20 Railway Street, Moorreesburg		Moorreesburg	Moorreesburg		33°09′13″S 18°40′10″E	Upload Photo
9/2/112/0008	Klipvlei, Moorreesburg		Moorreesburg	Moorreesburg		33°08′47″S 18°39′58″E	Upload Photo
9/2/112/0009	Tontelberg, Moorreesburg District		Moorreesburg	Moorreesburg			Upload Photo
9/2/112/0010	Eastern Terminal Beacon of Sir Thomas Maclear's Zwartland survey base line, Geelekuil 432 (Eendrag), Moorreesburg District	Type of site: Beacon.		Moorreesburg	Provincial Heritage Site	33°14′00″S 18°30′30″E	Upload Photo
9/2/112/0011	Old School Building, Church Street, Moorreesburg		Moorreesburg	Moorreesburg			Upload Photo
9/2/112/0012	Tiger Oats Complex, Moorreesburg Dist		Moorreesburg	Moorreesburg			Upload Photo
9/2/113/0001	PRINCE EDWARD ISLAND GROUP, GENERAL					46°37′51″S 37°56′29″E	Upload Photo
9/2/113/0002	MARION ISLAND, GENERAL					46°54′13″S 37°45′50″E	Upload Photo
9/2/113/0003	PRINCE EDWARD ISLAND, GENERAL					46°37′51″S 37°56′29″E	Upload Photo
9/2/114/0001	MITCHELLS PLAIN MAGISTERIAL DISTRICT, GENERAL						Upload Photo
9/2/700	SHIPWRECKS GENERAL						Upload Photo
HM\EDEN\MOSSEL BAY\PINNACLE POINT	Pinnacle Point		Mossel Bay		Provincial Heritage Site	34°12′23″S 22°05′28″E	Upload Photo
HM\WEST COAST\CEDERBERG\CAPE DESEADA	Baboon Point (also known as Cape Deseada)	A range of heritage resources of high significance is located on Baboon Point. The heritage significance of Baboon Point is particularly high in terms of the scientific value of archaeological and palaeontological sites that contribute to a wider understanding of southern African indigenous cultural history, local past environment and identification of original animal populations and their changes through time. Its aesthetic value also ranks high due to its almost unparalleled landmark qualities and by its role in defining important elements of the West Coast landscape character. The historical significance of Baboon Point is not only highlighted by the cultural sequence encapsulated in a number of ancient archaeological sites, but also by several World War 2 Radar station buildings. These structures are the testimony of South Africa’s role in a global historic event. These buildings also have a particular association with important social developments in South Africa as a result of the institutionalised Apartheid system, namely their use to house migrant labourers serving the local fishing industry. The high degree of significance of Baboon Point is also supported by the presence of rare and/or endangered aspects of natural and cultural heritage.	Elands Bay		Provincial Heritage Site	32°19′05″S 18°19′02″E	Upload Photo
HM\WEST COAST\CEDERBERG\DIEP KLOOF ROCK SHELTER	Diepkloof Rock Shelter		Elands Bay		Provincial Heritage Site	32°23′12″S 18°27′10″E	
HM\WEST COAST\CEDERBERG\MUSSEL POINT	Mussel Point (also known as Mike Taylor's Midden)	There are only a handful of shell middens along the West Coast of South Africa that are as large and deep as Mike Taylor's Midden (MTM). These very large sites, named "megamiddens", are the expression of unique social and economic (subsistence) solutions to environmental and demographic challenges that pre-colonial san hunter-gatherers had to face between 3000 and 2000 years before present (BP). MTM megamidden is at least 350m long and 200m wide and has a depth that varies between 1.0 and 1.5m. MTM dates to between 980 and 2800 BP, however, much of this occupational sequence dates to between 2100 and 2500 BP. For this reason, MTM is singular among megamiddens in that it offers the best chronological resolution (greatest volume for shortest period of time) for the later part of this unique period of the precolonial history of South Africa.	Elands Bay		Provincial Heritage Site	32°20′12″S 18°19′03″E	There are only a handful of shell middens along the West Coast of South Africa that are as large and deep as Mike Taylor's Midden (MTM). These very large sites, named "megamiddens", are the expression of unique social and economic (subsistence) solutions to environmental and demographic challenges that pre-colonial san hunter-gatherers had to face between 3000 and 2000 years before present (BP). MTM megamidden is at least 350m long and 200m wide and has a depth that varies between 1.0 and 1.5m. MTM dates to between 980 and 2800 BP, however, much of this occupational sequence dates to between 2100 and 2500 BP. For this reason, MTM is singular among megamiddens in that it offers the best chronological resolution (greatest volume for shortest period of time) for the later part of this unique period of the precolonial history of South Africa.
HM\WEST COAST\CEDERBERG\VELORNEVLEI HERITAGE VILLAGE	Velorenvlei Heritage Village		Elands Bay		Provincial Heritage Site	32°19′44″S 18°22′21″E	
HM\WEST COAST\MATZIKAMA\RATELGAT	Ratelgat		Vanrhynsdorp		Provincial Heritage Site		Upload Photo
HM\WEST COAST\SALDANHA BAY\PATERNOSTER MIDDEN	Pasternoster Midden		Paternoster		Provincial Heritage Site	32°48′17″S 17°54′02″E	Upload Photo
HM\WINELANDS\WITZENBERG \SARON	Saron Mission		Saron		Provincial Heritage Site		
