= List of heritage sites in Beaufort West =

This is a list of the heritage sites in Beaufort West, Western Cape Province, South Africa, as recognized by the South African Heritage Resource Agency.

SAHRA identifier	Site name	Description	Town	District	NHRA status	Coordinates	Image
9/2/010/0001	BEAUFORT WEST MUNICIPAL AREA, GENERAL		Beaufort West	Beaufort West			Upload Photo
9/2/010/0002	Beaufort West Reformed Church, 85 Donkin Street, Beaufort West	Neo-Gothic church, cruciform, with square tower at entrance and octagonal spire with clock above. Lancet windows with cusped arches, sometimes in pairs. Plasterwork spire, plasterwork around doors and windows, and plasterwork buttress detail. The building replaced a thatched church. It was built in 1826-31 and enlarged in 1892-94. James Bisset was the architect of alterations. Architectural style: Neo-Gothic. Type of site: Church; Current use: Church.	Beaufort West	Beaufort West	Provincial Heritage Site	32°21′00″S 22°34′59″E	Neo-Gothic church, cruciform, with square tower at entrance and octagonal spire with clock above. Lancet windows with cusped arches, sometimes in pairs. Plasterwork spire, plasterwork around doors and windows, and plasterwork buttress detail. The building replaced a thatched church. It was built in 1826-31 and enlarged in 1892-94. James Bisset was the architect of alterations. Architectural style: Neo-Gothic. Type of site: Church Current use: Church. Media related to Dutch Reformed Church, Beaufort West at Wikimedia Commons
9/2/010/0002/001	Cypress tree, Bird Street, Beaufort West	This cypress tree is the only one remaining of about 25 similar trees that were planted in the original Dutch Reformed cemetery in 1834. Type of site: Tree This cypress tree is the only one remaining of about 25 similar trees that were planted in the original Dutch Reformed cemetery in 1834.	Beaufort West	Beaufort West	Provincial Heritage Site	32°20′48″S 22°35′01″E	This cypress tree is the only one remaining of about 25 similar trees that were planted in the original Dutch Reformed cemetery in 1834. Type of site: Tree This cypress tree is the only one remaining of about 25 similar trees that were planted in the original Dutch Reformed cemetery in 1834.
9/2/010/0003	Old Town Hall, 87 Donkin Street, Beaufort West	Single-story building with 5 bays. Symmetrical roof hidden by parapet, and a bracketed cornice. Hexagonal bell tower over clock above Donkin street entrance. Windows with shouldered arches. Rusticated pilasters. The Town Hall of Beaufort West stands in the main street, at the centre of the-historic Karoo town. It is a striking building, white and massive with bold lines and an old-fashioned tower. The origins of Beaufort West go back to 1818. Architectural style: Eclectic. Type of site: Town Hall; Previous use: Town Hall. Current use: Museum. This building is the first Town Hall of the first Municipality in the country and was built in 1865-1866 by James Bisset. It accommodated the town council, public library, post office, and police station. it is now part of Beaufort West Museum, it houses a display of Prof Chris Barnard, the first doctor to perform a heart transplant.	Beaufort West	Beaufort West	Provincial Heritage Site	32°21′02″S 22°34′59″E	Single-story building with 5 bays. Symmetrical roof hidden by parapet, and a bracketed cornice. Hexagonal bell tower over clock above Donkin street entrance. Windows with shouldered arches. Rusticated pilasters. The Town Hall of Beaufort West stands in the main street, at the centre of the-historic Karoo town. It is a striking building, white and massive with bold lines and an old-fashioned tower. The origins of Beaufort West go back to 1818. Architectural style: Eclectic. Type of site: Town Hall Previous use: Town Hall. Current use: Museum. This building is the first Town Hall of the first Municipality in the country and was built in 1865-1866 by James Bisset. It accommodated the town council, public library, post office, and police station. it is now part of Beaufort West Museum, it houses a display of Prof Chris Barnard, the first doctor to perform a heart transplant.
9/2/010/0004	Matoppo House, 7 Bird Street, Beaufort West	Single-story building, L-shaped, with 7 bays. Symmetrical. Pitched roof, with plain end gables and mock-chimneys. Front wall with plaster paneling and hoods over openings. Double door with fanlight, French doors and sliding sash windows with Louvre shutters NM 1991. Second drostdy, for J J Meintjes. Type of site: House; Current use: House.	Beaufort West	Beaufort West	Provincial Heritage Site	32°20′48″S 22°35′01″E	Single-story building, L-shaped, with 7 bays. Symmetrical. Pitched roof, with plain end gables and mock-chimneys. Front wall with plaster paneling and hoods over openings. Double door with fanlight, French doors and sliding sash windows with Louvre shutters NM 1991. Second drostdy, for J J Meintjes. Type of site: House Current use: House. Media related to Matoppo House at Wikimedia Commons
9/2/010/0005	see 9/2/010/0009		Beaufort West	Beaufort West			Upload Photo
9/2/010/0006	Dutch Reformed Church Parsonage, Merweville, Beaufort West		Beaufort West	Beaufort West			
9/2/010/0007	Old Girls' Public School, Church Street, Beaufort West	Double-story stone building. Main facade comprises triangular main gable with Palladian windows below; there is a pair of split rectangular gables over each of the other windows. There are split semi-circular gables over the side windows, which exist in pairs. Louvred lantern roof ventilator. Building opened 10 October 1879 but the Girls' Public School opened 15 July 1891. An east wing for the nursery school was added in 1897 and opened in 1899. It is a fine example of Victorian public architecture. Type of site: School; Previous use: School. Current use: Municipal offices.	Beaufort West	Beaufort West	Provincial Heritage Site	32°21′01″S 22°35′11″E	Double-story stone building. Main facade comprises triangular main gable with Palladian windows below; there is a pair of split rectangular gables over each of the other windows. There are split semi-circular gables over the side windows, which exist in pairs. Louvred lantern roof ventilator. Building opened 10 October 1879 but the Girls' Public School opened 15 July 1891. An east wing for the nursery school was added in 1897 and opened in 1899. It is a fine example of Victorian public architecture. Type of site: School Previous use: School. Current use: Municipal offices.
9/2/010/0008	Cemeteries, Bird Street, Beaufort West	The original portion of this ring-wall dates from 1857 and was erected when the Nederduitse Gereformeerde (NG) Church cemetery was laid out. A joint fund-raising campaign by the NG and the Anglican congregations in 1887 enabled them to extend the ring-wall. Type of site: Graveyard	Beaufort West	Beaufort West	Provincial Heritage Site	32°21′28″S 22°35′08″E	The original portion of this ring-wall dates from 1857 and was erected when the Nederduitse Gereformeerde (NG) Church cemetery was laid out. A joint fund-raising campaign by the NG and the Anglican congregations in 1887 enabled them to extend the ring-wall. Type of site: Graveyard
9/2/010/0009	Dutch Reformed Church, 161 Church Street, Merweville	Type of site: Church Current use: Church : Dutch Reformed.	Merweville	Beaufort West	Provincial Heritage Site	32°40′15″S 21°30′53″E	Type of site: Church Current use: Church : Dutch Reformed.
9/2/010/0010	Anglo-Boer War Blockhouse, Beaufort West		Beaufort West	Beaufort West			Upload Photo
9/2/010/0011	Masonic Hotel, 94 Donkin Street, Beaufort West		Beaufort West	Beaufort West		32°21′17″S 22°35′00″E	Upload Photo
9/2/010/0012	Clyde House, 37 Donkin Street, Beaufort West	Double-story building with hipped roof. 3 bays, symmetrical. Double verandah, plain roof, returned, with plenty of ornamental cast-iron detail. Hoods and keystones above windows. Front door 6 panels, leaded fanlight, stained glass. Sliding sash windows. Multicoloured front door. Built in 1839 for Dr James Christie, first full-time government doctor in the area. He was also town councillor, MP & director of Beaufort Bank. The building served as a police station 1898 till after the Anglo-Boer War. Type of site: House; Current use: Backpackers.	Beaufort West	Beaufort West	Provincial Heritage Site	32°20′47″S 22°34′56″E	Double-story building with hipped roof. 3 bays, symmetrical. Double verandah, plain roof, returned, with plenty of ornamental cast-iron detail. Hoods and keystones above windows. Front door 6 panels, leaded fanlight, stained glass. Sliding sash windows. Multicoloured front door. Built in 1839 for Dr James Christie, first full-time government doctor in the area. He was also town councillor, MP & director of Beaufort Bank. The building served as a police station 1898 till after the Anglo-Boer War. Type of site: House Current use: Backpackers. Media related to Clyde House, Beaufort West at Wikimedia Commons
9/2/010/0013	Old Central High School, Beaufort West		Beaufort West	Beaufort West			Upload Photo
9/2/010/0014	Corbelled hut, Vleifontein, Laingsburg	Corbelled drystone dwelling (nat mon) said to be the southernmost example. It has a kookskerm. Other structures Extensive drystone kraals on both sides of valley Harmse family massacre on N side of valley, opposite corbelled dwelling When vacated: Type of site: Corbelled House Go S from BW, turn W on Merweville/Fraserburg road, to Berg-en-Dal. Then go up little pass through valley which opens up to Karoo beyond Losberg. Go N up Oukloof Pass towards Fraserburg, turn R at gate marked Branewynsgat, through several gates (all S of This corbelled house is a good example of the type of vernacular architecture developed by the pioneers of this area in the nineteenth century.		Beaufort West	Provincial Heritage Site	32°09′21″S 22°01′14″E	Upload Photo
9/2/010/0015	Little Green World, 38 Donkin Street, Beaufort West		Beaufort West	Beaufort West		32°20′50″S 22°34′56″E	Upload Photo
9/2/010/0016	Old Public Library, 15 Kerk Street, Beaufort West	A somewhat ponderous version of the eclectic style. Triangular pediment, horizontal and raking cornices, semi-circular cap on pediment, with rustication to windows and gable ventilator. Porch on Ionic columns. This impressive Edwardian building, with its neoclassical features, was erected by Matthew Deas, master-builder of Beaufort West. The front gable bears the date 1906. Type of site: Library; Previous use: Library. Current use: Municipal offices.	Beaufort West	Beaufort West	Provincial Heritage Site	32°19′07″S 22°34′25″E	A somewhat ponderous version of the eclectic style. Triangular pediment, horizontal and raking cornices, semi-circular cap on pediment, with rustication to windows and gable ventilator. Porch on Ionic columns. This impressive Edwardian building, with its neoclassical features, was erected by Matthew Deas, master-builder of Beaufort West. The front gable bears the date 1906. Type of site: Library Previous use: Library. Current use: Municipal offices.
9/2/010/0017	Dutch Reformed Mission Church and Parsonage, 89/91 Donkin Street.		Beaufort West	Beaufort West		32°20′53″S 22°34′57″E	
9/2/010/0017/001	Old Dutch Reformed Mission Church Parsonage, 91 Donkin Street, Beaufort West	S/s villa, hipped roof, triangular louvred ventilators, projecting wing on R with covered end gable & bay window with 3 shuttered sash windows. Verandah roof on timber posts, wooden brackets & pendants, balustrade The early nineteenth century parsonage was enlarged in 1914 by the Rev. A.H. Barnard and was the birthplace of the well-known heart surgeon, Prof Chris Barnard and his brother Dr Marius Barnard. Type of site: Pastorie; Previous use: Parsonage. Current use: Museum.	Beaufort West	Beaufort West	Provincial Heritage Site	32°21′03″S 22°35′00″E	S/s villa, hipped roof, triangular louvred ventilators, projecting wing on R with covered end gable & bay window with 3 shuttered sash windows. Verandah roof on timber posts, wooden brackets & pendants, balustrade The early nineteenth century parsonage was enlarged in 1914 by the Rev. A.H. Barnard and was the birthplace of the well-known heart surgeon, Prof Chris Barnard and his brother Dr Marius Barnard. Type of site: Pastorie Previous use: Parsonage. Current use: Museum.
9/2/010/0017/002	Old Dutch Reformed Mission Church, 89 Donkin Street, Beaufort West	Church, end gable with raking cornice & belfry faces street, twin lancet windows over entrance porch. Nave 4 bays, buttresses. Lancet windows, pointed hoods, with coloured diamond panes, original wooden tracery (?). Rough-cast walls, stone plinth. This Mission Church, the foundation stone of which was laid on 4 May 1871, was completed in December 1872 by the building contractor Adriaan Ventura. The Rev. Paulus Teshe was the main driving force behind its erection. Architectural style: Cape Neo-Gothic. Type of site: Church; Previous use: Church. Current use: Museum.	Beaufort West	Beaufort West	Provincial Heritage Site	32°21′03″S 22°34′59″E	Church, end gable with raking cornice & belfry faces street, twin lancet windows over entrance porch. Nave 4 bays, buttresses. Lancet windows, pointed hoods, with coloured diamond panes, original wooden tracery (?). Rough-cast walls, stone plinth. This Mission Church, the foundation stone of which was laid on 4 May 1871, was completed in December 1872 by the building contractor Adriaan Ventura. The Rev. Paulus Teshe was the main driving force behind its erection. Architectural style: Cape Neo-Gothic. Type of site: Church Previous use: Church. Current use: Museum.
9/2/010/0017/1	Old Dutch Reformed Mission Church Parsonage, 91 Donkin Street,		Beaufort West	Beaufort West	National Monument	32°20′53″S 22°34′57″E	Upload Photo
9/2/010/0018	Pear trees, Donkin Street, Beaufort West	2 Very old pear trees on pavement. One near Ye Olde Thatch died. Other one at Pritchard's Bldg. These pear trees were planted in 1850 and 1860. Type of site: Tree	Beaufort West	Beaufort West	Provincial Heritage Site	32°21′24″S 22°35′01″E	2 Very old pear trees on pavement. One near Ye Olde Thatch died. Other one at Pritchard's Bldg. These pear trees were planted in 1850 and 1860. Type of site: Tree
9/2/010/0019	Pritchard Building, 92 Donkin Street, Beaufort West		Beaufort West	Beaufort West		32°20′53″S 22°34′57″E	Upload Photo
9/2/010/0020	Grave of W A Arnot, Merweville, Beaufort West District		Beaufort West	Beaufort West			Upload Photo
9/2/010/0021	Poskoetshuis, 111 Bird Street, Beaufort West		Beaufort West	Beaufort West		32°20′49″S 22°35′01″E	Upload Photo
9/2/010/0022	Beaufort West East Dutch Reformed Mission Church, Beaufort West		Beaufort West	Beaufort West			Upload Photo
9/2/010/0023	Christ Church complex, Donkin Street, Beaufort West		Beaufort West	Beaufort West		32°20′45″S 22°34′57″E	Upload Photo
9/2/010/0024	Methodist cemetery, Beaufort West		Beaufort West	Beaufort West			Upload Photo
9/2/010/0026	Military Cemetery, Nelspoort, Beaufort West District		Beaufort West	Beaufort West			Upload Photo
9/2/010/0027	BEAUFORT WEST MAGISTERIAL DISTRICT, GENERAL		Beaufort West	Beaufort West			Upload Photo
9/2/010/0028	Catholic Cemetery, Thompson Street, Beaufort West		Beaufort West	Beaufort West			Upload Photo
9/2/010/0029	Droer Rivier (Eskom Sub-station), Beaufort West District.		Beaufort West	Beaufort West			Upload Photo
9/2/010/0030	Hillmore, Vetkuil 332, Beaufort West District		Beaufort West	Beaufort West			Upload Photo
9/2/010/0031	Guards Memorial, Farm Brak Pannen, Beaufort West District		Beaufort West	Beaufort West			Upload Photo
9/2/010/0032	KAROO NATIONAL PARK, BEAUFORT WEST DISTRICT		Beaufort West	Beaufort West			Upload Photo
