= Otjiwarongo Reformed Church =

The Otjiwarongo Reformed Church is the eighth oldest congregation of the Reformed Churches in South Africa (GKSA) in Namibia. At the end of 2008, it belonged with five other Namibian congregations to the denomination's Klassis Waterberg, while another 13 congregations belonged to the exclusively Namibian Klassis Etosha. However, in 2015, the Otjiwarongo congregation returned to the Klassis Etosha. Confirmed membership went down from 58 in 2014 to 44 in 2015, and baptized membership went down from 18 to 6 in the same year.

== History ==
GKSA worshipers in Otjiwarongo, in then South West Africa, were served until 1954 as a district of the Outjo Reformed Church, established in 1930 along with the Gobabis and Outjo Reformed Churches as a result of the repatriation of 1,922 Afrikaners, survivors and descendants of those who made the Dorsland Trek from Angola and were mainly GKSA members. On March 19, 1955, Otjiwarongo was separated from Outjo in a partnership agreement with those in Grootfontein (where the pastor preached 11 Sundays a year), Usakos, and Walvis Bay (11 days a year in the latter two, along with 22 Sundays in Otjiwarongo proper). The Rev. M.W. van der Walt was the first pastor of this joint congregation. He gained his own parsonage in June 1956. It was also decided to secure a church building, since services had heretofore been held in the auditorium of the Otjiwarongo Secondary School and now competed with those of the Dutch Reformed Church in South Africa (NHK). On June 28, 1958, the first church building was inaugurated.

After the Rev. Van der Walt took a post in the Krugersdorp-West Reformed Church, a new pastor arrived to take office in March 1959. E.W. Meyer was a native of Gobabis and the son of Ernst Meyer, South African consul in Angola. Seven lean years followed in which the congregation struggled financially with around 98 confirmed and 104 baptized members in 1959, much more than in 2014, and the pastor's family struggled with illnesses. On June 12, 1965, the Rev. Meyer left for a post in South Africa.

The Rev. P.J.L. du Plessis subsequently began conducting services on February 26, 1966, in combination with Grootfontein. However, in 1970, he left for a post at the Kuruman Reformed Church. The Rev. J.J. Venter was the new pastor from 1972. The membership grew rapidly, and that same year, an organ was purchased. The congregation prepared to separate from other territories in 1975. After the Rev. Venter left for a post in 1976 at the Vryheid Reformed Church, as many as 10 filled the job, but a long-term successor was not forthcoming. For the second time, C.J.J. Putter of Outjo worked as a consultant and helped hire the church's 17th pastor, the Rev. D.H.P. Wijnbeek, on April 16, 1977. The congregation was based in Otjiwarongo but had a district in Okakarara.

== Pastors ==
1. M.W. van der Walt, 1955 tot 1958 (together with Grootfontein, Usakos en Walvisbaai)
2. E.W. Meyer, March 1959 - June 1965
3. P.J.L. du Plessis, February 1966 - 1970 (together with Grootfontein)
4. Jurie Johannes Venter, 1972 - 1976 (together with Tsumeb)
5. Dirk Hendrik Petrus Wijnbeek, 1977 - 1983
6. Johannes Lodewicus van der Linde, 1984 - 1988, 1996 - 1997
7. Hendrik Lodewyk Jacobus Momberg, 1989 - 1995
8. Petrus Jacobus Venter, 1999 - 2002 (together with Outjo and Biermanskool)
9. Daniël Petrus Prinsloo, 2003 – 2015 (together with Outjo and Biermanskool)
10. J.P. (Jan) van der Walt, 2015 - present

== See also ==
- Otjiwarongo Reformed Church (NGK)

== Sources ==
- (af) Van der Merwe, Dr. Paul. 1981. Otjiwarongo 1906-1981. Otjiwarongo: Munisipaliteit Otjiwarongo.
