= Selago thomii =

Scientific classification
- Kingdom: Plantae
- Clade: Tracheophytes
- Clade: Angiosperms
- Clade: Eudicots
- Clade: Asterids
- Order: Lamiales
- Family: Scrophulariaceae
- Genus: Selago
- Species: S. thomii

Binomial name
- Selago thomii Rolfe

Species of flowering plant

Selago thomii is a species of plant in the family Scrophulariaceae. It is endemic to the Western Cape, South Africa.

== Description ==
Selago thomii is a perennial bush, branching densely and profusely from its lower stem. The stems are covered densely in small, adpressed, obtuse-tipped, linear-oblong leaves. New branches are minutely hairy, old branches with persistent dead leaves that are eventually shed.

Flowers are produced at various times of year, but especially from November to June.

Elongated racemes appear at the tips of the branches, containing numerous white flowers with glabrous or faintly glandular-hairy sepals and exserted stamens. The lanceolate-linear bracts are almost as long as the flowers' corolla tubes, and have acute tips.

=== Related species ===
Selago thomii is part of a group of very similar Selago species, including Selago aspera, Selago diffusa, Selago neglecta, Selago ramosissima and Selago triquetra. These species are small shrublets with solitary (non-fascicled), ericoid leaves, and terminal, raceme-like inflorescences.

Selago diffusa differs by having wider spikes and bracts, and longer calyx and corolla tube. The inflorescence of S. thomii is in many ways very much smaller.

Selago ramosissima differs by having more obviously hairy bracts, calyces and lobes. The bracts, calyx and lobes of S. thomii are glabrous or only very faintly glandular. The interior of the S. thomii calyx tube is always glabrous. The S. thomii lobes are also usually glabrous with at most a few tiny glands at the apices.

== Distribution ==
Selago thomii is endemic to the Western Cape, South Africa, where it occurs in rocky renosterveld or fynbos habitats, in the Little Karoo and Overberg regions.

It occurs from the Robertson and Montagu areas in the north-west, southwards into the Overberg region (recorded from Hermanus, Riviersondered and Riversdale), and north-eastwards as far as the Uniondale area.
