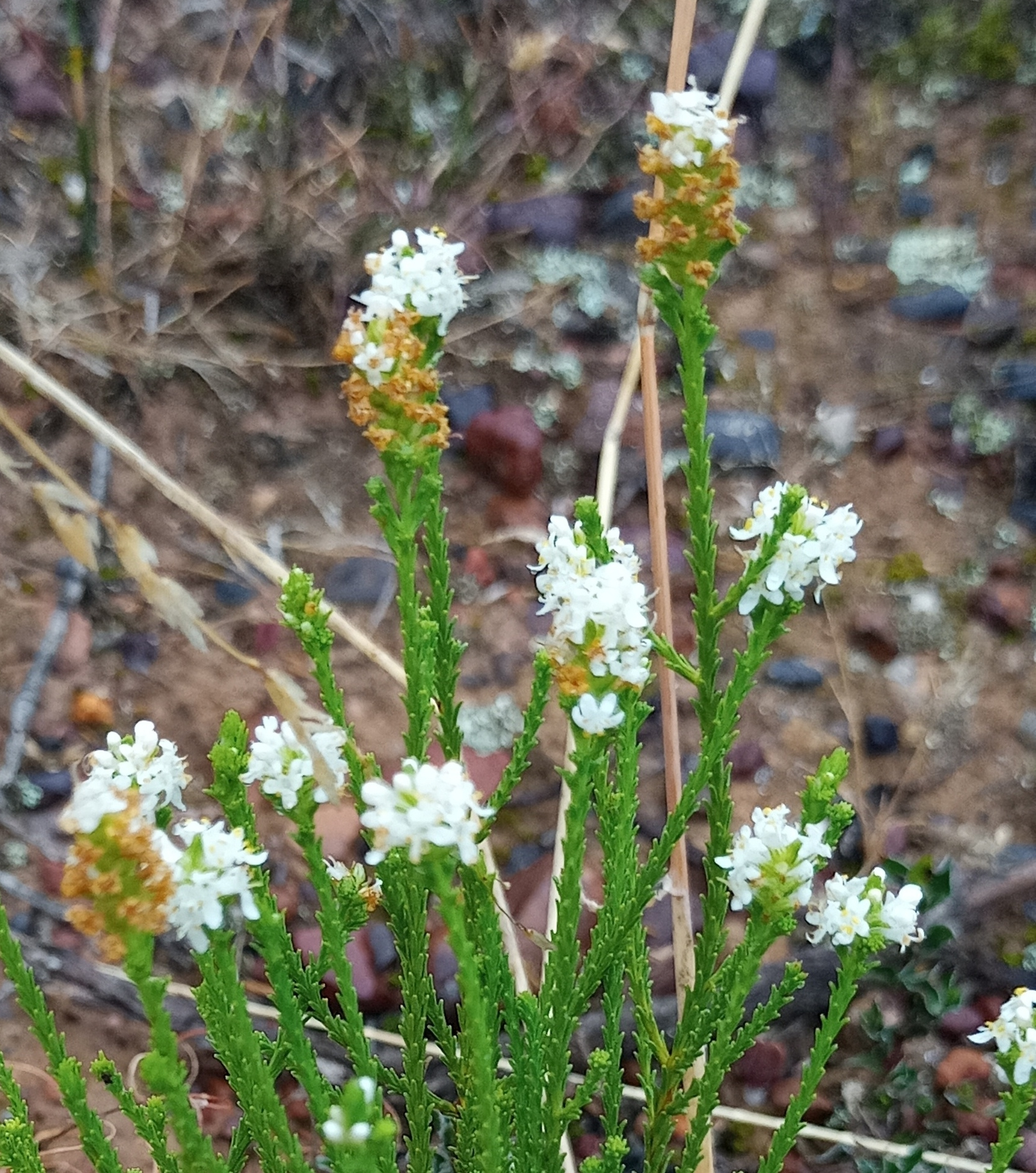
- Selago ramosissima in flower

Conservation status
- Endangered (IUCN 3.1)

Scientific classification
- Kingdom: Plantae
- Clade: Tracheophytes
- Clade: Angiosperms
- Clade: Eudicots
- Clade: Asterids
- Order: Lamiales
- Family: Scrophulariaceae
- Genus: Selago
- Species: S. ramosissima

Binomial name
- Selago ramosissima Rolfe

= Selago ramosissima =

Species of flowering plant

Selago ramosissima is a species of plant in the family Scrophulariaceae. It is endemic to the Western Cape, South Africa.

== Description ==
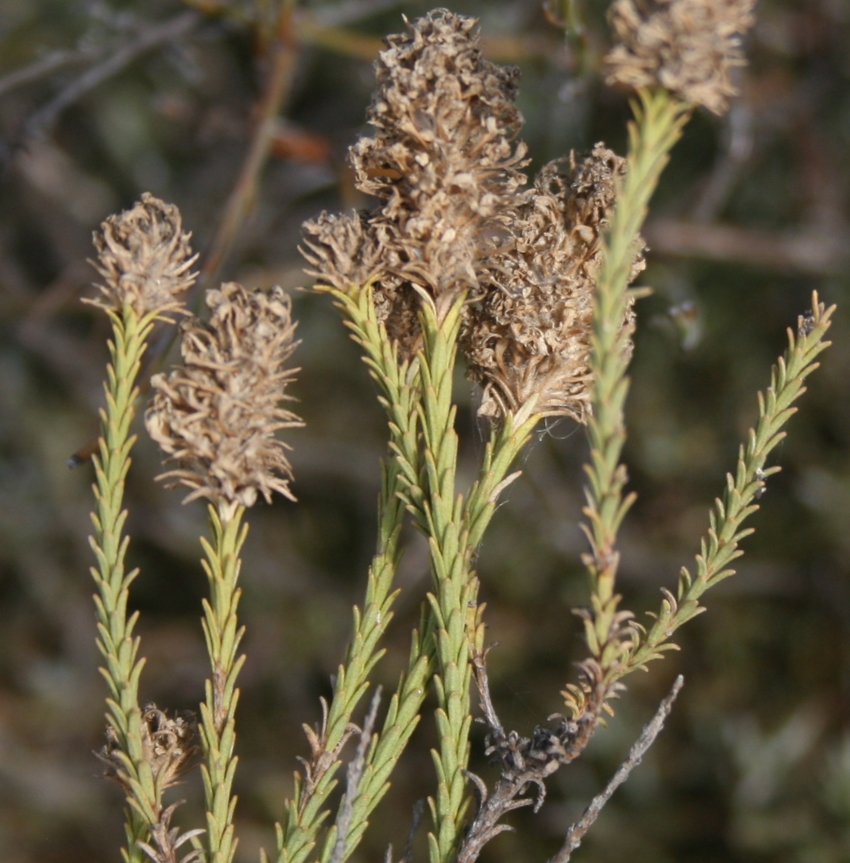
The small, dense, adpressed leaves of Selago ramosissima. The flowers are dead and dried, but the very long bracts are still visible

Selago ramosissima is a small, perennial shrublet, branching profusely from its lower stem. The stems are covered densely in small, thick, adpressed, obtuse-tipped, linear-oblong leaves. New branches are minutely hairy, old branches with persistent dead leaves that are eventually shed.

The principal flowering season is September to October.

Relatively short racemes appear at the tips of the numerous branches, containing white flowers with hairy sepals and exserted stamens. The bracts are very long - at least as long as the flowers' corolla tubes - and have obtuse tips. The bracts, like the calyx, are noticeably very furry.

=== Related species ===
Selago ramosissima is part of a group of very similar Selago species, including Selago aspera, Selago diffusa, Selago neglecta, Selago thomii and Selago triquetra. These species are small shrublets with solitary (non-fascicled), ericoid leaves, and terminal, raceme-like inflorescences.

== Distribution ==
Selago ramosissima is endemic to the Western Cape, South Africa, where it occurs in the Overberg-Riversdale region in rocky succulent karoo habitats.

It occurs from the Swellendam area in the west (the type locality is near the Riviersondered-Breede river confluence), south to the ruggens hills between Bredasdorp and De Hoop, and eastwards through Riversdale and Albertinia, as far as Great Brak.
