= Gobabis Reformed Church (NGK) =

Congregation of the Dutch Reformed Church in Namibia

The Gobabis Reformed Church is a congregation of the Dutch Reformed Church in South Africa (NGK) in Gobabis in eastern Namibia. In 1961, the Gobabis-South daughter congregation was founded, which was reincorporated into the mother church on October 21, 2012, making Gobabis the seventh city in Namibia to have two NGK congregations.

== History ==
The congregation separated from the Windhoek Reformed Church (NGK) on November 24, 1939, and on December 11 of that year already held its first church council meeting under the chairmanship of its custodian, the Rev. K.W. Le Rouw (the Windhoek pastor), to make his first appeal fora pastor in Gobabis, but it was unsuccessful.

At the second council meeting, on March 2, 1940, Prop. F.J. Hay was selected, and on May 18 of that year, he was confirmed as pastor of the congregation. The Rev. and Mrs. Hay left the congregation after a fruitful five years, in which the building of its first parsonage had already begun. After a vacancy of eight months, Gobabis welcomed the Rev. and Mrs. J.L. von Wielligh, but a short but successful three years passed before the couple finally responded to the entreaties of the Port Shepstone Reformed Church and left to work there.

Following another eight-month vacancy, Prop. J.M. Olivier was ordained and invested in the post on April 8, 1950. Fourteen months later, he left for another line of work, producing yet another vacancy for an entire year.

The congregation completed its parsonage and built a spacious church hall. After long years of collections to build it, the church was finally completed in the early 1950s. The membership grew from around 400 in 1939 to over 800 in 1951. In 1961, Gobabis-South separated from the mother congregation, and in 2010 the congregations collectively had 156 fewer members than 60 years earlier, foreshadowing their re-merger on October 21, 2012. Gobabis was the last Namibian town to boast 2 NGK congregations (besides Walvis Bay, which still has three). The other daughter churches, in Keetmanshoop, Outjo, Grootfontein, Tsumeb, Otjiwarongo, Mariental, had all been reincorporated into their mother congregations years earlier.

== Select pastors ==
- Francois Jacobus Hay, 1940–1945
- Johannes Lodewicus von Williegh, 1946–1949
- J.M. Olivier, 1950–1951
- Johannes Hendrik Jooste, 1952–1957
- Andrew Stephen Benecke, 1958–1965
- Jacobus Frederik Mouton, December 4, 1965 – 1976
- Deon Louw, August 1976 – November 1981
- Johannes Maritz, – 2018 (accepted a post in Okahandja)

== See also ==
- Gobabis Reformed Church
