= Okahandja Reformed Church (NGK) =

The Okahandja Reformed Church is a congregation of the Dutch Reformed Church in South Africa (NGK) in central Namibia.

There was contact between Cape Town and Okahandja as early as 1792, when Pieter Brand and Van Reenen sailed up the Swakop River near Okahandja. Brand was likely the first white men to come there. Okahandja had a long, eventful history because the Nama and Herero met there and fought many wars over the territory. More than 150 years ago, Christianity was brought to the area by the work of the Rhenish Missionary Society.

The town's name means "small wide" in the Herero language, since the river is quite short but near the town very wide. The congregation was once a district of the very large Gibeon congregation, which at the time encompassed half of South West Africa (SWA). In 1929, Okahandja became part of the Windhoek Reformed Church (NGK) upon the latter's secession from Gibeon. In October 1946, Okahandja followed suit with its own secession, welcoming its first pastor, the Rev. J.T. Potgieter, formerly of Gibeon.

The congregation was quite small in 1952 at a mere 320 members, only 28 less than in 2010 and 63 less than in 2015, but was already self-sustaining. The church hall had already gone into service in 1930, and the parsonage was completed in 1950 on the foundations of what was once the house of the Herero captain Samuel Maharero, who fired the first shot of the Herero Wars from his yard in 1903.

The church building, inaugurated in 1974, was designed by the architect J. Anthonie Smith, who designed more than 60 NGK churches.

== Select pastors ==
- Jacobus Venter, 1991 - 2003 (accepted his emeritus)
- Johannes Maritz, 2018 – present (earlier with the Gobabis Reformed Church (NGK))

== Sources ==
- Olivier, ds. P.L. (compiler). 1952. Ons gemeentelike feesalbum. Cape Town/Pretoria: N.G. Kerk-Uitgewers.

== See also ==
- Okahandja Reformed Church
