= Keetmanshoop Reformed Church (NGK) =

Congregation of the Dutch Reformed Church in South Africa

The Keetmanshoop Reformed Church is a congregation of the Dutch Reformed Church in South Africa (NGK) in southern Namibia. It is the third oldest NGK congregation in the country after Mariental (founded in 1898 as Gibeon) and Otjiwarongo (founded in 1902 as Moria). Up until the founding of the Keetmanshoop congregation, the entire area known then as South West Africa (SWA) was divided between the two mother churches.

== Background ==
Before Keetmanshoop was given its current name, it was known as Swartmodder (in Khoekhoe Nu Gôias) and was known for the many murders committed there. The name Keetmanshoop replaced Swartmodder in 1866, courtesy of the Rev. Schröder who founded a mission here that year on behalf of the Rhenish Missionary Society (RMS). He named the town in honor of the RMS chairman, a Rev. Keetman from Elberfeld, who contributed 1,000 thalers (£150). Hence the name: literally "Keetman's hope."

== Congregation business ==
The first pastor of the Keetmanshoop Reformed Church was the Rev. H.J. Potgieter, who was in office from 1925 to 1930, followed by S.P. Fouché (1931-1937), S.H. van der Spuy (1938-1944), J.R. Holzapfel (1944-1947), G.N.P. Cloete (1948-1949), and the Rev. D. Brink (1950-1954).

Until March 1951, when the Windhoek Reformed Church (NGK) was founded, Keetmanshoop was the only NGK congregation with a tower church in the territory. It was also the first NGK church to have a pipe organ when a 35-register one was installed in November 1950. Prior to the church's building, the congregation used a former smithy donated by the Gibeon church for its daughter and later shared the Keetmanshoop Reformed Church (GKSA) building, that congregation having been founded in 1936.

In 1950, the town already boasted one of the few high schools in SWA, the Hoërskool P.K. de Villiers, as well as a large primary school in town and three more in the congregational district. After the institution of English as a teaching language from grades 4 through 12, Afrikaner parents in Keetmanshoop founded the Keetmanshoop Private School, which in 2013 educated around 250 pupils in those grades employing 19 teachers.

Keetmanshoop-North separated from the mother church in 1958, but was reincorporated into it in 2000. With 578 confirmed members and 149 baptized members in 2012, Keetmanshoop was one of the largest congregations in Namibia. At the end of 2014, the numbers were 534 and 125 respectively.

== Select pastors ==
1. Hermanus Jacobus Potgieter, 1925–1930
2. Stephanus Phlippus Fouché, 1931–1937 (emeritus; died March 4, 1945)
3. Stephanus Hofmeyr van der Spuy, 1938–1944
4. Johannes Rudolf Holzapfel, 1944–1947
5. Gert Nicolaas Petrus Cloete, 1948–1949
6. Daniël Brink, 1950–1954
7. Jan Louis Oosthuizen Bruwer, 1952–1957
8. Dr. Coenraad Fredrik Bekker, 1958–1962
9. Johannes Lucas le Roux, 1963 – February 1965
10. Hermanus Venter, 1965–1970
11. Jacob van Wyk du Plessis, 1968–1972
12. Petrus Jacobus Johannes Franzsen, 1972–1976
13. Pieter Barnard Botha, 1977–1981
14. Gerhardus Stephanus Enslin, 1978–1981

== Membership in Southern Namibia ==
In the first decades of the congregation's existence, the town and district's population grew rapidly, as did that of the greater SWA population. In 1930, the Gibeon mother church had 700 confirmed members, Moria 800 (growing to 1,560 by 1932), Keetmanshoop 1,352, Warmbad (founded in 1928 south of Keetmanshoop) 850, and Windhoek (founded in 1929) 800 (1932 number). These were the only five congregations in SWA at the time. In 1952, congregations had so multiplied in the mandate area that they had to be separated into the nine in the Otjiwarongo Ring and the eight in the Gibeon ring. The Bethanie Reformed Church (NGK) opened in 1938, northwest and west of the mother church's area, and both it and Warmbad were daughter churches of Keetmanshoop.

Given the two separations and several later ones, Keetmanshoop was left by 1950 with around 1,000 confirmed members and a total of 1,800 people including those baptized. Warmbad by then had 1,086 confirmed, Bethanie had 370, and Lüderitz (a daughter church of Bethanie) had 490, meaning that an area that had around 1,350 confirmed members in 1930 had around 3,000. With the depopulation of the Namibian countryside, the Southern Ring (to which the Mariental church belonged) had 2,600 members in 2012, compared to around 5,800 members in 1952, before congregations were added in Karasburg (1952), Stampriet (1955), Aroab (1955), Kalkrand (1960), and Ariamsvlei (1962). By 2016, the Southern Ring only included 2,135 members.

== Sources ==
- Olivier, rev. P.L. (compiler). 1952. Ons gemeentelike feesalbum. Cape Town/Pretoria: N.G. Kerk-Uitgewers.
- Dreyer, Rev. A., 1932. Jaarboek van die Nederduits-Gereformeerde Kerke in Suid-Afrika vir die jaar 1933. Cape Town: Jaarboek-Kommissie van die Raad van die Kerke.
- Van Rene, Adri-Louise (president: Tydskriftemaatskappy). 2012. Jaarboek van die NG Kerke 2012. Wellington: Tydskriftemaatskappy.
- Vogel, ds. W. (chairman: editing committee). 2012. Die Almanak van die Gereformeerde Kerke in Suid-Afrika vir die jaar 2012. Potchefstroom: Administratiewe Buro.
- Albertyn, W. (ed.). 1978. Amptelike Suid-Afrikaanse munisipale jaarboek. Pretoria: S.A. Vereniging van Munisipale Werknemers (nie-politiek).
- Bulpin, T.V., 2001. Discovering Southern Africa. Cape Town: Discovering Southern Africa Publications cc.

== See also ==
- Keetmanshoop Reformed Church
