= Matthys du Toit =

Christian pastor (1874–1959)

Rev Matthys du Toit
- Born: Matthys Michielse du Toit; December 3, 1874; Montagu, Cape Colony
- Died: August 18, 1959 (aged 84); Cape Town, Union of South Africa
- Occupation: Pastor
- Years active: 1905–1941
- Religion: Christianity
- Church: Dutch Reformed Church in South Africa

The Rev. Matthys Michielse du Toit (Montagu, Cape Colony, December 3, 1874 - Cape Town, August 18, 1959) was a Christian pastor in the Dutch Reformed Church in South Africa (NGK).

He was the pastor of six congregations from 1905 to 1941. The congregations were in South West Africa, the Orange Free State and Cape Province and were: Barrydale (1905–1912), Reddersburg (1912–1920), Excelsior (1920–1921), Moria (now Otjiwarongo, 1921–1922), Hopetown (1922–1925), and Joubertina (1925–1941). According to his own testimony, "the Lord's blessing must have shadowed the work for so many Souls to be brought to the light."

Du Toit was a long-time member of the NGK's General Mission Commission. After accepting his emeritus in 1941, he spent a great deal of time working in various congregations, as well as hospital work. At the time of his death at 85, he was the only survivor of the 17 men with whom he was ordained in 1904.

== Childhood and education ==
Matthys Michielse du Toit was born the oldest son of his parents in Montagu, where he worked in his father's general store after finishing school. He received his calling to preach in 1891 during a major spiritual revival in Montagu, spurring him to begin a long spiritual education, first in Montagu and later in Stellenbosch. This led him and 16 other candidates to be ordained in December 1904.

== Barrydale ==
The Rev. Du Toit arrived in Barrydale in 1905. In those days, a minister was expected to hold three services every Sunday. He found this taxing for his throat and the church council granted him permission to hold two services on a doctor's advice. During his time there, a new church was built and expanded. On December 12, 1905, a special service was held there by the former pastor, G.P. van der Merwe, to usher out the old church which had served the congregation for 28 years.

A.A.J. van Niekerk wrote the congregation's centennial commemorative book in 1980.

In Ons Kerk Album, a history of NGK churches, du Toit is said to have worked tirelessly for the mission and to have "nurtured much real love for the cause of the Great King" among this congregation.

== Moria ==
At the church council meeting on April 4, 1921, of what was at the time Moria, now Otjiwarongo, the council pledged £100 to recruit a new pastor for the congregation. This post was offered to du Toit and at the council meeting on August 6, 1921, in Omaruru, he was accepted. Railway workers made up a large proportion of the congregation. Articles about his work in the Kerkbode (November 10, 1921 - November 22, 1922) describe his travels of up to 11,000 miles in one year. He used any vehicle at hand, including: "passenger train, freight train, automobile, trolley, horse-cart, mule-cart, donkey-cart, and oxcart. He even tried riding a camel."

In his report for the Britstown Ring (1922), the Rev. Du Toit shows his work with the Moria congregation: he had held 191 services, including 167 in Moria and 24 in Gibeon (later capital of the Mariental Reformed Church (NGK)); 21 young members were confirmed and 41 children baptized.

== Hopetown ==
The Rev. J. de Villiers, a missionary, was there to welcome Rev. Du Toit on his investiture as pastor of the Hopetown Reformed Church (NGK) in 1922. Du Toit worked for three years preaching and traveling "in withering heat, over immense distances" to the three diamond mines within the congregation's remit. In the congregation's 75th anniversary commemorative book, he remembered in particular the Pentecost revivals held Pentecost and the congregation's healthy relationship with the mission church.

In 1923, the diggings at Brakfontein Farm were proclaimed public by W. Higgs (magistrate of Hopetown). A diamond rush was on, and prospector shacks sprung up overnight. At this time, the church was able to pay off debt, buy du Toit a car and renovate the church building.

== Joubertina ==
After the resignation of the Rev. Van Rensburg of the Joubertina Reformed Church (NGK) in the Langkloof, the Revs. P.J. Van der Merwe (Murray, De Doorns), W.N. van der Merwe (Wellington), and Du Toit were considered for the post. Du Toit was officially inaugurated on Friday, September 25, 1925, and he, his wife, and their sons were ushered from Twee Riviere in a procession of 18 automobiles, 38 carriages, and 68 cavalry to their welcome in Joubertina. His confirmation was held that Saturday night by the Rev. C.H. Stulting (Humansdorp). He preached the next morning on 2 Corinthians 12.

== Family Life ==
On March 13, 1906, du Toit married Ms. Anna Johanna Le Roux (born September 4, 1879) in Paarl. After 33 years, she died at their home in Joubertina on December 17, 1939, after a severe illness, which had left her bedridden for eight months. They had four sons who all graduated from Stellenbosch University.

After 16 months, du Toit married E.M. de Wet (née Lombard) in Queenstown. Several weeks later on May 25, 1941, he accepted his emeritus, preaching his farewell sermon on John 21:7. After many more years of volunteer work and serving on Mission and Synod Commissions, he died in Rondebosch on August 18, 1959.

== Sources ==
- (af) Hanekom, Dr. T.N. 1952. Die hoë toring. Die Ned. Geref. Kerk Otjiwarongo Gedenkboek (1902–1952). Otjiwarongo: NG Kerkraad.
- (af) Hopkins, H.C. 1957. Gendenkboek by die goue jubileum van die Ned. Geref. Kerk Joubertina. Joubertina: NG Kerkraad.
- (nl) Maeder, the Rev. G.A. and Zinn, Christian. 1917. Ons Kerk Album. Cape Town: Ons Kerk Album Maatschappij Bpkt.
- (af) Olivier, the Rev. P.L. (compiler). 1952. Ons gemeentelike feesalbum. Cape Town and Pretoria: N.G. Kerk-Uitgewers.
- (af) Van Niekerk, A.A.J. 1980. Barrydale 1880–1980. Die geskiedenis van ’n kerk en ’n gemeenskap. Barrydale: Die Feeskomitee.
- (af) Van Wijk, the Rev. J.H. and Geldenhuys, the Rev. Norval (chief compiler). 1959. Jaarboek van die Nederduitse Gereformeerde Kerk 1960. Cape Town: N.G. Kerk-Uitgewers.
- (af) Wiid, Rina. 2004. 150 jubeljare. 1854–2004. Hopetown: NG Kerkraad.
