= Honiball =

Honiball is a surname. Notable people with the surname include:

- Henry Honiball (born 1965), South African rugby union footballer
- T. O. Honiball (1905–1990), South African cartoon artist
