= List of heritage sites in Robertson and Montagu =

This is a list of the heritage sites in Robertson and Montagu, situated in the Cape Winelands District Municipality (Western Cape), as recognized by the South African Heritage Resources Agency.

SAHRA identifier	Site name	Description	Town	District	NHRA status	Coordinates	Image
9/2/063/0001	50 Long Street, Montagu	This gabled house dates from 1858 and forms an important element in the street scene of Long Street, Montagu. This dwelling-house has straight end gables and a plain front gable and is a typical example of this specific phase of the Cape-Dutch architecture.	Montagu	Montagu	Provincial Heritage Site	33°47′21″S 20°07′13″E	Upload Photo
9/2/063/0002	33 Long Street, Montagu	These five properties form an integral part of the historical core of Montagu, which was largely laid out on the farm Uitvlugt in 1850. The buildings which are situated in Long Street, the oldest street in the town, as well as Bath Street.	Montagu	Montagu	Provincial Heritage Site	33°47′20″S 20°07′23″E	These five properties form an integral part of the historical core of Montagu, which was largely laid out on the farm Uitvlugt in 1850. The buildings which are situated in Long Street, the oldest street in the town, as well as Bath Street.
9/2/063/0003	46 Long Street, Montagu	This thatch-roofed house with its two plain straight end- gables, which was built predominantly in the Cape Dutch style, dates from the 1850s.	Montagu	Montagu	Provincial Heritage Site	33°47′22″S 20°07′10″E	Upload Photo
9/2/063/0004	55 Long Street, Montagu		Montagu	Montagu	National Monument	33°47′17″S 20°07′30″E	Upload Photo
9/2/063/0005	MONTAGU MUNICIPAL AREA, GENERAL		Montagu	Montagu	Pending Declaration		Upload Photo
9/2/063/0006	6 Long Street, Montagu	These five properties form an integral part of the historical core of Montagu, which was largely laid out on the farm Uitvlugt in 1850. The buildings which are situated in Long Street, the oldest street in the town, as well as Bath Street.	Montagu	Montagu	Provincial Heritage Site	33°47′25″S 20°06′54″E	Upload Photo
9/2/063/0007	British fort, Cogmanskloof, Montagu		Montagu	Montagu	National Monument		
9/2/063/0008	40 Long Street, Montagu		Montagu	Montagu	Provincial Heritage Site	33°47′21″S 20°07′13″E	Upload Photo
9/2/063/0009	17 Long Street, Montagu	This Cape Dutch house, the front gable of which is an excellent example of the so-called Worcester gable, was erected in 1859. The house reflects the architectural tradition which gives Long Street and the historical core of Montagu their character.	Montagu	Montagu	Provincial Heritage Site	33°47′23″S 20°07′03″E	This Cape Dutch house, the front gable of which is an excellent example of the so-called Worcester gable, was erected in 1859. The house reflects the architectural tradition which gives Long Street and the historical core of Montagu their character.
9/2/063/0010	42A and 44 Bath Street, Montagu		Montagu	Montagu	Provincial Heritage Site	33°47′12″S 20°07′18″E	Upload Photo
9/2/063/0011	Dutch Reformed Church Parsonage, 9 Rose Street, Montagu	The parsonage in Rose Street, Montagu, was built in Dr D. F. Malan who resided there until 1913. Type of site: Parsonage; Current use: Parsonage. This stately and spacious home, with its interesting architecture has historical connections with the ministry of Dr D. F. Malan.	Montagu	Montagu	Provincial Heritage Site	33°47′47″S 20°07′19″E	Upload Photo
9/2/063/0012	Municipal office, 3 Piet Retief Street, Montagu	These five properties form an integral part of the historical core of Montagu, which was largely laid out on the farm Uitvlugt in 1850. The buildings which are situated in Long Street, the oldest street in the town, as well as Bath Street, which serves as Type of site: Educational; Previous use: School. Current use: Offices / Library.	Montagu	Montagu	Provincial Heritage Site	33°47′11″S 20°07′05″E	Upload Photo
9/2/063/0013	Erf 0161, 20 Bath Street, Montagu	These five properties form an integral part of the historical core of Montagu, which was largely laid out on the farm Uitvlugt in 1850. The buildings which are situated in Long Street, the oldest street in the town, as well as Bath Street, which serves as Current use: Residential/Commercial. These five properties form an integral part of the historical core of Montagu. The buildings are the oldest street in the town and date from the late nineteenth century reflecting the Cape Dutch and Victorian styles of building.	Montagu	Montagu	Provincial Heritage Site	33°47′16″S 20°07′04″E	Upload Photo
9/2/063/0014	24 Bath Street, Montagu	These five properties form an integral part of the historical core of Montagu, which was largely laid out on the farm Uitvlugt in 1850. The buildings which are situated in Long Street, the oldest street in the town, as well as Bath Street. These five properties form an integral part of the historical core of Montagu. The buildings are the oldest street in the town and date from the late nineteenth century reflecting the Cape Dutch and Victorian styles of building.	Montagu	Montagu	Provincial Heritage Site	33°47′16″S 20°07′06″E	Upload Photo
9/2/063/0015	58 Long Street, Montagu	This unique complex, consisting of a rural Cape Dutch house and semi-detached wine cellar, was erected in 1871 by Francois du Toit. He was married to the daughter of Gideon Johannes Retief, youngest brother of the Voortrekker leader Net Retief. This compl This unique complex, consisting of a rural Cape Dutch house and semi-detached wine cellar, was erected in 1871 by Francois du Toit. He was married to the daughter of Gideon Johannes Retief, youngest brother of the Voortrekker leader Net Retief. This compl	Montagu	Montagu	Provincial Heritage Site	33°46′08″S 20°07′32″E	Upload Photo
9/2/063/0016	21 Piet Retief Street, Montagu	The property is a true Victorian dwelling-house. The house was built by D.S. Prins. D.S.Prins also built a number of other buildings in Montagu and was known as the "Master Builder" of Montagu.	Montagu	Montagu	Provincial Heritage Site	33°47′09″S 20°07′16″E	Upload Photo
9/2/063/0017	26 Long Street, Montagu	This double-storeyed building with its typical Georgian features dates from the 1890s. The property not only forms an integral part of the historic core of Montagu, but is also a significant architectural component of Long Street, the oldest street in the	Montagu	Montagu	Provincial Heritage Site	33°46′07″S 20°07′31″E	Upload Photo
9/2/063/0018	Dutch Reformed Church, Bath Street, Montagu	Type of site: Church Current use: Church : Dutch Reformed.	Montagu	Montagu	Provincial Heritage Site	33°47′16″S 20°06′58″E	Type of site: Church Current use: Church : Dutch Reformed.
9/2/063/0019	Montagu Museum, Long Street, Montagu	The old Mission Church at Montagu was built in 1907 and is of considerable interest, both from the architectural point of view and with regard to the unique street facade of Long Street. Type of site: Church, Museum; Previous use: Church. Current use: Museum.	Montagu	Montagu	Provincial Heritage Site	33°47′25″S 20°07′00″E	The old Mission Church at Montagu was built in 1907 and is of considerable interest, both from the architectural point of view and with regard to the unique street facade of Long Street. Type of site: Church, Museum Previous use: Church. Current use: Museum.
9/2/063/0020	32 Long Street, Montagu	This dwelling is largely in the Cape Dutch style, with, the cellar forming an integral part of the house. This property and the other historic buildings in Long Street form an important historical and architectural group.	Montagu	Montagu	Provincial Heritage Site	33°46′08″S 20°07′33″E	Upload Photo
9/2/063/0021	35 Long Street, Montagu		Montagu	Montagu	Provincial Heritage Site	33°46′09″S 20°07′33″E	Upload Photo
9/2/063/0022	Joubert House, 25 Long Street, Montagu	This T-shaped Cape Dutch house was erected in 1854 and is one of the three oldest houses in Montagu. In June 1880 S.J.P. Kruger and General P. J.Joubert were entertained in this house. Type of site: House. Previous use: House. Current use: Museum.	Montagu	Montagu	Provincial Heritage Site	33°47′23″S 20°07′06″E	This T-shaped Cape Dutch house was erected in 1854 and is one of the three oldest houses in Montagu. In June 1880 S.J.P. Kruger and General P. J.Joubert were entertained in this house. Type of site: House. Previous use: House. Current use: Museum.
9/2/063/0023	Old Library, Bath Street, Montagu	These five properties form an integral part of the historical core of Montagu, which was largely laid out on the farm Uitvlugt in 1850. The buildings which are situated in Long Street, the oldest street in the town, as well as Bath Street. Type of site: Library These five properties form an integral part of the historical core of Montagu. The buildings are the oldest street in the town and date from the late nineteenth century reflecting the Cape Dutch and Victorian styles of building.	Montagu	Montagu	Provincial Heritage Site	33°47′16″S 20°07′06″E	Upload Photo
9/2/063/0024	30 Bath Street, Montagu		Montagu	Montagu	Provincial Heritage Site	33°47′15″S 20°07′08″E	Upload Photo
9/2/063/0025	20 Long Street, Montagu		Montagu	Montagu	Provincial Heritage Site	33°46′06″S 20°07′31″E	Upload Photo
9/2/063/0027	Mimosa Lodge, 15 Church Street, Montagu	Type of site: House Current use: Hotel. 15 Church street, also known as Mimosa Lodge, is a double storied building dating to the last years of the 19th century, although an earlier dwelling possibly dating c. 1860 may have been included in the present building.	Montagu	Montagu	Register	33°47′00″S 20°07′00″E	Upload Photo
9/2/063/0028	Montagu Magisterial District, General		Montagu	Montagu	Pending Declaration		Upload Photo
9/2/063/0029	Montagu Cave, Farm Derdeheuwel, Montagu District		Montagu	Montagu			Upload Photo
9/2/063/0030	Eerstepos, 18 Church Street, Montagu	This Victorian building was the first post office in Montagu, also used during the Anglo-Boer War as the headquarters of the British troops, and became a residential home from about 1918. It is very well kept and largely intact.	Montagu	Montagu	Register	33°47′00″S 20°07′00″E	Upload Photo
9/2/063/0031	ASHTON MUNICIPAL AREA, GENERAL		Ashton	Montagu			Upload Photo
9/2/080/0001	Robertson Municipal Area, General		Robertson	Robertson			Upload Photo
9/2/080/0002	McGregor Municipal Area, Robertson District, General		McGregor	Robertson			
9/2/080/0002-293	Erf 377, Voortrekker Street, McGregor	T-plan vernacular cottage with reed thatch, hooded gable over front door and straight end gables. External hearth. 4-pane casements, wooden door. Type of site: House; Current use: Residential. The oldest of these two buildings is a T-shaped cottage in the vernacular style, dating from about 1860. The second cottage, from a later phase, is constructed in the typical Georgian Karoo style. The property in its entirety forms an important architectural	McGregor	Robertson	Provincial Heritage Site	33°56′56″S 19°49′38″E	Upload Photo
9/2/080/0002-307	Erven 189, 190, 191 cnr Barry and Mill Streets, McGregor	Vernacular cottage thatched roof and straight end gables. Additions with lower thatched roof and stepped-up parapet to left. 8 × 8 casements. 6 × 6 sashes and 12-pane casements. Extension to right has flat roof with stepped parapets, pergola on plastered The oldest of these two buildings is a T-shaped cottage in the vernacular style and dates from about 1860. The second cottage is from a later phase and is constructed in the typical Georgian Karoo style. The property in its entirety forms an important ar Type of site: House; Current use: Residential. The oldest of these two buildings is a T-shaped cottage in the vernacular style and dates from about 1860. The second cottage is from a later phase and is constructed in the typical Georgian Karoo style. The property in its entirety forms an important ar	McGregor	Robertson	Provincial Heritage Site	33°56′38″S 19°49′49″E	Upload Photo
9/2/080/0002-314	Mulberry Cottage, 430, Barry Street, McGregor	Vernacular cottage with reed thatch and straight end gables. Slatted shutters to windows. Outbuilding with parapet walls. Type of site: House; Current use: Residential. Historical and architectural interest This property forms part of the historic centre of McGregor with its picturesque houses in the vernacular style. 10/2/542. P. G. J. KOORNHOF, Minister of National Education.	McGregor	Robertson	Provincial Heritage Site	33°56′41″S 19°49′53″E	Upload Photo
9/2/080/0002-317	Erf 378, Peppertree Cottage, Voortrekker Street, McGregor	Vernacular cottage with reed thatch, straight end gables and external hearth. 6-pane casements with exposed wood lintels. Stable door. Type of site: House; Current use: Residential. Historical and architectural interest This property forms part of the historic centre of McGregor with its picturesque houses in the vernacular style. 10/2/542. P. G. J. KOORNHOF, Minister of National Education.	McGregor	Robertson	Provincial Heritage Site	33°56′55″S 19°49′39″E	Vernacular cottage with reed thatch, straight end gables and external hearth. 6-pane casements with exposed wood lintels. Stable door. Type of site: House Current use: Residential. Historical and architectural interest This property forms part of the historic centre of McGregor with its picturesque houses in the vernacular style. 10/2/542. P. G. J. KOORNHOF, Minister of National Education.
9/2/080/0002-321	Erf 378, McGregor		McGregor	Robertson	Provincial Heritage Site	33°56′34″S 19°49′29″E	Upload Photo
9/2/080/0003	Dwelling, Erf 275, Keerom Street, McGregor, Robertson District		McGregor	Robertson			Upload Photo
9/2/080/0004	Orange Grove, Norree, Robertson District		McGregor	Robertson		33°44′38″S 19°47′16″E	Upload Photo
9/2/080/0005	Old Wesleyan Church, Paul Kruger Street, Robertson	Type of site: Church	Robertson	Robertson	Provisional Protection	33°48′01″S 19°53′09″E	Upload Photo
9/2/080/0006	Oupa se Wingerd, Weltevrede Wine Estate, Robertson District	Type of site: Vineyard Landscape Oupa se Wingerd is a small block of 780 vines which are the remnant of a vineyard of 16,000 red muscadel vines planted in 1926 by Klaas Jonker, founder of the Weltevrede Estate and one of the early wine farmers of the region. These remaining vines are		Robertson	Register	33°56′12″S 20°02′27″E	Upload Photo
9/2/080/0007	Old Mill Lodge, Mill Street, McGregor		McGregor	Robertson		33°55′51″S 19°49′22″E	
9/2/080/0007-003	Old Mill Lodge, Erf 4, 100, Mill Street, McGregor	Vacant erf Historical and architectural interest These cottages, in the vernacular style, date from the second half of the nineteenth century. The water mill is one of the few remaining undamaged mills in the country. The properties form an important architectural p	McGregor	Robertson	Provincial Heritage Site	33°56′51″S 19°49′34″E	Upload Photo
9/2/080/0007/1	Erf 644, Voortrekker Street, McGregor		McGregor	Robertson	National Monument		Upload Photo
9/2/080/0008	Erf 4, Mill Street, McGregor		McGregor	Robertson	Provincial Heritage Site	33°56′51″S 19°49′34″E	Upload Photo
9/2/080/0009	Die Trein, Erf 51, Voortrekker Street, McGregor	4 attached vernacular cottages, straight end gables with parapets except for cottage 2nd from left which has flat roof behind stepped up parapet with simple moulded detail. Windows are 3 × 2 sliding sashes, doors have 3-pane fanlights over. Cement stoep Type of site: House; Current use: Residential. This interesting architectural group of buildings consists of four attached houses in the vernacular style. The oldest part is about 100 years old. The other parts were added from time to time according to the needs of the owners.	McGregor	Robertson	Provincial Heritage Site	33°56′59″S 19°49′35″E	4 attached vernacular cottages, straight end gables with parapets except for cottage 2nd from left which has flat roof behind stepped up parapet with simple moulded detail. Windows are 3 × 2 sliding sashes, doors have 3-pane fanlights over. Cement stoep Type of site: House Current use: Residential. This interesting architectural group of buildings consists of four attached houses in the vernacular style. The oldest part is about 100 years old. The other parts were added from time to time according to the needs of the owners.
9/2/080/0010	"Ons Huisie", Long Street, McGregor, Robertson District		McGregor	Robertson	National Monument	33°56′37″S 19°49′50″E	Upload Photo
9/2/080/0011	Sewenfontein, Robertson District		McGregor	Robertson			Upload Photo
9/2/080/0012	Powder Magazine, Robertson	The Power Magazine in Robertson was erected by Barry and Nephews in 1880 and was used for the storage of explosives until 1965. Type of site: Powder Magazine The Power Magazine in Robertson was erected by Barry and Nephews in 1880 and was used for the storage of explosives until 1965.	Robertson	Robertson	Provincial Heritage Site		Upload Photo
9/2/080/0013	Druid's Lodge, Paul Kruger Street, Robertson	This predominantly Georgian dwelling-house was probably one of the earliest houses erected at Robertson after its foundation in 1853. It originally had Cape Dutch characteristics. The Georgian and Victorian alterations were probably made by the English.	Robertson	Robertson	Provincial Heritage Site	33°48′01″S 19°53′09″E	Upload Photo
9/2/080/0014	63 Van Reenen Street, Robertson	This house with its impressive cast-iron veranda was erected in 1914. It is an excellent example of late-Victorian architecture.	Robertson	Robertson	Provincial Heritage Site	33°48′01″S 19°52′45″E	This house with its impressive cast-iron veranda was erected in 1914. It is an excellent example of late-Victorian architecture.
9/2/080/0015	Old Library, Robertson	This predominantly Edwardian building was designed by the firm Tully and Waters of Cape Town and was officially opened on 28 December 1904. The building was originally intended to commemorate King Edward VII's coronation in 1902 and to serve as a library. Type of site: Library	Robertson	Robertson	Provincial Heritage Site	33°48′07″S 19°53′15″E	This predominantly Edwardian building was designed by the firm Tully and Waters of Cape Town and was officially opened on 28 December 1904. The building was originally intended to commemorate King Edward VII's coronation in 1902 and to serve as a library. Type of site: Library
9/2/080/0016	58 Van Reenen Street, Robertson	Historic Robertson owes its architectural variety to, inter alia, houses in the Cape Dutch, Georgian and Victorian styles. An example of the Victorian style, this double-storeyed house from the late nineteenth century forms an integral part of the town's	Robertson	Robertson	Provincial Heritage Site	33°48′10″S 19°52′55″E	Upload Photo
9/2/080/0017	Wolfkloof, Robertson District			Robertson	Provincial Heritage Site	33°48′07″S 19°53′16″E	
9/2/080/0018	Erf 191, Barry Street, McGregor, Robertson District		McGregor	Robertson	National Monument		Upload Photo
9/2/080/0019	Block bounded by Keerom, Long and Lady Grey Streets, McGregor	Housing scheme consisting of detached and semi-detached thatched cottages in the 'McGregor style' They have straight end gables and external chimneys, and wide eaves with exposed rafters. Composite 6-pane wooden casements; stable doors. Stoep enclosed Type of site: House; Current use: Residential. This strategically situated site forms an integral part of the historic core of McGregor. The 28 housing units on the site were erected in 1976 in the traditional vernacular style by means of a subsidy from the National Monuments Council.	McGregor	Robertson	Provincial Heritage Site	33°56′54″S 19°49′48″E	Housing scheme consisting of detached and semi-detached thatched cottages in the 'McGregor style' They have straight end gables and external chimneys, and wide eaves with exposed rafters. Composite 6-pane wooden casements; stable doors. Stoep enclosed Type of site: House Current use: Residential. This strategically situated site forms an integral part of the historic core of McGregor. The 28 housing units on the site were erected in 1976 in the traditional vernacular style by means of a subsidy from the National Monuments Council.
9/2/080/0020	Erf 642, Smith Street, McGregor, Robertson District		McGregor	Robertson			Upload Photo
9/2/080/0021	Erf 625, Mill Street, McGregor, Robertson		McGregor	Robertson	National Monument		Upload Photo
9/2/080/0022	Nature Reserve, McGregor, Robertson District		McGregor	Robertson	National Monument		Upload Photo
9/2/080/0023	McGregor Conservation Area, McGregor, Robertson District		McGregor	Robertson			Upload Photo
9/2/080/0024	Victorian Posting Box, 21 Truter Street, Robertson		McGregor	Robertson	Pending Designation	33°48′07″S 19°53′04″E	Upload Photo
9/2/080/0025	Erf 23, Voortrekker Street, McGregor, Robertson District		McGregor	Robertson	Pending		Upload Photo
9/2/080/0026	Die Ou Pasteur, Erf 55, Voortrekker Street, McGregor, Robertson		McGregor	Robertson			Upload Photo
9/2/080/0027	Erf 163, Office Street, McGregor, Robertson District		McGregor	Robertson			Upload Photo
9/2/080/0028	Erf 214, Loop Street, McGregor, Robertson District		McGregor	Robertson			Upload Photo
9/2/080/0029	Old Gaol, Erf 219, Long Street, McGregor, Robertson District		McGregor	Robertson			Upload Photo
9/2/080/0030	Erf 464, Long Street, McGregor, Robertson District		McGregor	Robertson			Upload Photo
9/2/080/0031	Erf 390, Long Street, McGregor, Robertson District		McGregor	Robertson			Upload Photo
9/2/080/0032	St Mary's Church, Robertson		McGregor	Robertson		33°46′12″S 19°53′52″E	Upload Photo
9/2/080/0033	Erven 66 and 69, Bree Street, McGregor	This double-storeyed dwelling-house is a good example of the Georgian style and forms an important element of the historical centre of McGregor.	McGregor	Robertson	Provincial Heritage Site	33°56′58″S 19°49′33″E	Upload Photo
9/2/080/0033-001	Mercury House, Erf 69, Bree Street, McGregor	Double storey building with IBR roof behind parapet. Upper floor (probably later addition) has steel casements. Ground floor has 6 × 6 sashes with internal shutters. S/Storey extensions to either side of building. Type of site: House; Current use: Residential. This double-storeyed dwelling-house is a good example of the Georgian style and forms an important element of the historical centre of McGregor.	McGregor	Robertson	Provincial Heritage Site	33°56′59″S 19°49′34″E	Upload Photo
9/2/080/0034	Rhebokskraal, Robertson District	This gabled house dates from 1874 and is one of the best examples of the last stages of the Cape-Dutch architectural style. Apart from the Cape-Dutch elements, this dwelling-house also has typical characteristics of the Georgian and Victorian styles. Type of site: Farm This gabled house dates from 1874 and is one of the best examples of the last stages of the Cape-Dutch architectural style. Apart from the Cape-Dutch elements, this dwelling-house also has typical characteristics of the Georgian and Victorian styles.		Robertson	Provincial Heritage Site	33°48′15″S 19°53′20″E	Upload Photo
9/2/080/0035	Erf 375, Plein Street, McGregor	These two cottages in the vernacular style date from the second half of the nineteenth century. The property in its entirety forms an important architectural element of the historic centre of McGregor.	McGregor	Robertson	Provincial Heritage Site	33°57′08″S 19°49′24″E	Upload Photo
9/2/080/0036	Block bounded by Mill, Plein, Darling & Van Reenen Streets, McGregor		McGregor	Robertson	National Monument	33°57′01″S 19°49′20″E	Upload Photo
9/2/080/0037	Block bounded by Mill, Plein, Darling & Smith Streets, McGregor		McGregor	Robertson		33°57′05″S 19°49′15″E	Upload Photo
9/2/080/0037/01	Erf 605 (Ptn old Erf 8), Plein Street, McGregor		McGregor	Robertson	National Monument		Upload Photo
9/2/080/0037/02	Erf 606 (Ptn old Erf 8), Mill Street, McGregor		McGregor	Robertson			Upload Photo
9/2/080/0037/03	Erf 607 (Ptn old Erf 8), Mill Street, McGregor		McGregor	Robertson			Upload Photo
9/2/080/0037/04	Erf 608 (Ptn old Erf 8), Mill Street, McGregor		McGregor	Robertson			Upload Photo
9/2/080/0037/05	Erf 609 (Ptn old Erf 8), Smith Street, McGregor		McGregor	Robertson			Upload Photo
9/2/080/0037/06	Erf 610 (Ptn old Erf 8), Smith Street, McGregor		McGregor	Robertson			Upload Photo
9/2/080/0037/07	Erf 604 (Ptn old Erf 8), Plein Street, McGregor		McGregor	Robertson			Upload Photo
9/2/080/0038	Municipal offices, Erf 81, Voortrekker Street, McGregor	Two buildings, attached. The left is single storey under thatch, central gable dated 1876. Straight end parapets, central front double door with fanlight, new 3×2 sashes with half shutters. 2 new single solid doors with fanlights. Quarry tile sills to The Municipal Offices are situated in the centre of McGregor and consists of a gabled house and a Georgian annex, both of which date from about 1870. The gabled house is a representative example of the last flickering of the Cape Dutch architectural style. Type of site: Institutional; Current use: Municipal offices and Library.	McGregor	Robertson	Provincial Heritage Site	33°57′05″S 19°49′26″E	Upload Photo
9/2/080/0039	Dutch Reformed Church, Erf 48, Church Street, McGregor	Imposing church building, cruciform plan with tower inserted between the two street wings. Straight end gables to the end of each wing, with moulded parapets and decorative mouldings applied to gable walls. Large arched timber windows. Type of site: Church; Current use: Church : Dutch Reformed. This architecturally interesting Dutch Reformed Church building is built in the neo-Gothic style and forms an essential part of the historic core of McGregor village.	McGregor	Robertson	Provincial Heritage Site	33°55′51″S 19°49′22″E	Imposing church building, cruciform plan with tower inserted between the two street wings. Straight end gables to the end of each wing, with moulded parapets and decorative mouldings applied to gable walls. Large arched timber windows. Type of site: Church Current use: Church : Dutch Reformed. This architecturally interesting Dutch Reformed Church building is built in the neo-Gothic style and forms an essential part of the historic core of McGregor village.
9/2/080/0040	Remainder of Erf 600, Bree Street, McGregor		McGregor	Robertson	National Monument		Upload Photo
9/2/080/0041	Erf 798, Bree Street, (Ptn of Erf 600), McGregor		McGregor	Robertson			Upload Photo
9/2/080/0042	Erf 659, Darling Street, McGregor		McGregor	Robertson			Upload Photo
9/2/080/0043	Erf 601, Bree Street, McGregor		McGregor	Robertson			Upload Photo
9/2/080/0044	Erf 645, (Ptn of Erf 100), Voortrekker Street, McGregor		McGregor	Robertson	National Monument		Upload Photo
9/2/080/0045	Erf 605, Plein Street, McGregor		McGregor	Robertson	National Monument		Upload Photo
9/2/080/0046	Erf 606, Mill Street, McGregor		McGregor	Robertson			Upload Photo
9/2/080/0047	Erf 602, Darling Street, McGregor		McGregor	Robertson			Upload Photo
9/2/080/0048	Erf 657 Darling Street, McGregor		McGregor	Robertson			Upload Photo
9/2/080/0049	Erf 106, Tindall Street, McGregor	Vernacular cottage with reed thatch, triangular end gables and external chimney. 4-pane and single-pane casements. Stable door. Type of site: House. Current use: Residential.	McGregor	Robertson	Register	33°56′50″S 19°49′43″E	Upload Photo
9/2/080/0050	ROBERTSON MAGISTERIAL DISTRICT GENERAL		Robertson	Robertson			Upload Photo
9/2/080/0051	14 Truter Street, Robertson		Robertson	Robertson		33°48′13″S 19°53′12″E	Upload Photo
9/2/080/0052	Erf 371 & Ptn 316 (now 476-503), cnr Long & Keerom Sts, McGregor		McGregor	Robertson	Apply for Declaration	33°56′40″S 19°50′03″E	Upload Photo
