= Montagu Museum =

- Established: 1975
- Location: 41 Long Street, Montagu, 6720
- Coordinates: 33°47′20.48″S 20°7′15.14″E
- Type: Cultural History
- Curator: Nonkosi Mgijima
- Owners: Department of Cultural Affairs & Sport (Western Cape Government), South Africa
- Website: http://www.westerncape.gov.za/eng/directories/facilities/131/4616

The Montagu Museum is a museum of Montagu, Western Cape (Cape Winelands District Municipality).

The museum was built in 1907 and declared a national monument in 1976.

== The Museum ==
The main aim of the Montagu Museum is to research and portray the cultural-historical heritage of Montagu and its people.

The Museum owns a collection of oil paintings and drawings by the South-African artist François Krige who lived and worked in Montagu. Included in the collection is one of his major works ‘’Begrafnis in die Karoo’’ (Burial in the Karoo) which he bequeathed to the Museum.

The Museum has its own oval date stamp which is an exact replica of the postmark first used in Montagu in 1858. The distinctive design to post offices in the Cape from 1853 onwards, were based on Liverpudlian, and American date stamps. All letters and postcards mailed at the Museum are stamped with this unique date stamp.

The museum houses the T.O Honiball collection of cartoons and books. Honiball's works appeared in Die Burger for many years, containing satirical and humorous depiction of animal characters .

The museum contains an exhibit of the Brink Brothers exhibition Between 1902 and 1985 they owned a hotel, a department store, a winery, and a canning factory which exported canned fruit and dried fruit.

The archive houses all documents, photographs and Africana relating to the history of Montagu. The devastation caused by the flood of 25 January 1981 has been fully documented by the museum.

The Museum has been researching traditional herbal remedies since 1982.

== Buildings ==
=== Joubert House ===
The Joubert House is situated in no 25 Long Street. A national monument built in 1853, it is the oldest house in the town. After the flood of January 1981 it was saved from demolition and restored by the Board of Trustees. Today it functions as a House Museum that portrays the lifestyle of the rural Victorian era. At the back of Joubert House there is an Indigenous Medicinal Plant Garden.

=== Art Gallery ===
In 2007 the new art gallery was established in a part of the KWV Building . The art gallery was opened with an exhibition of sculptures and works by Willie Bester, a native of Montagu. It also houses a permanent exhibition of work by Francois Krige. Regular exhibitions by other noted South African artist are held in the gallery.

== Other educational activities and services ==
- Educational programmes for primary and secondary schools
- Outreach programmes to the youth and elderly
- Guided tours of the Museum
- Historical information to the public for assignments.

== Literature ==
- Administrator of the Province of the Cape of Good Hope, No 134,1975.
- Cape Museums Ordinance No 8 of 1975.
