= Annie van der Merwe =

Anna Aletta Elizabeth (Annie) van der Merwe (née Kruger, Springbok Flats, Potgietersrus district [now Mokopane], 12 August 1919 – 7 November 2004) was a leader of the sisters of the Reformed Churches in South Africa (GKSA) in South West Africa (SWA).

After going to primary school in her birthplace, she studied at the Potchefstroom University for Christian Higher Education and in 1941 obtained her Bachelor of Arts in social sciences. In May 1942, she married Dr. D.C.S. van der Merwe, then pastor at the Petrusburg Reformed Church. His full career in the GKSA went as follows: Petrusburg 1941-1944, Vryburg 1944-1950, Windhoek 1950-1957, missionary in Potchefstroom-North 1957-1967, professor Hammanskraal Theological Seminary 1967-1972, Potchefstroom Theological Seminary 1972-1977, and finally Ficksburg Reformed Church 1978-1982. He accepted his emeritus afterward and died on 10 November 1997.

In August 1942, her husband was interned for six months in Koffiefontein, but he was granted parole of eight months afterwards which the young couple spent on his family farm.

From 1943 to 1950, the Van der Merwes worked in the extended joint congregation of Vryburg-Goeie Hoop. They served in a pivotal time when the church in Vryburg installed an organ and a church building was opened for Goeie Hoop. While in Vryburg, their oldest daughter died in a fire.

In 1950, they moved to Windhoek, where they would stay for seven and a half years. Mrs. Van der Merwe began devoting herself to housework and gardening while attending to her five children and month-old baby. Due to the massive size of the congregation in area and the paucity of GKSA pastors in SWA, her husband was often home only a few days a month. She would later report that her body almost cracked under the strain. He found himself working as far afield as the Cape Province and worked as a consultant for two years in northern SWA.

She and the sisters of the congregation also helped build the church hall in Windhoek. In 1951, they started the Gereformeerde Sustersbond ("GKSA Sisterhood") and socially contributed to founding 17 chapters of the Vrouelandbou-unie (VLU, "Farm Women's Union") throughout SWA. She was chairwoman of the Sisterhood and the executive committee of the VLU, commander of the Suid- Afrikaanse Noodhulpliga ("South African First Aid League") in SWA, and a PTA member. She worked tirelessly to organize Afrikaner women ecclesiastically and socially. In 1959, Ida Bosman wrote of the Van der Merwes: "They left deep tracks in SWA."

From June 1957, her husband taught at the missionary school in Potchefstroom, and Annie continued to contribute to the mission there, as she would in Ficksburg from 1978 to 1982.

Annie's only sibling was the Rev. Hein Kruger.

Willemien le Roux, widow of the Rev. Braam le Roux, recalled Annie van der Merwe in 2017 as "an impressive, independent, and loving human being. She fulfilled her role completely as a good role model with a lovely attitude."

== See also ==
- Reformed Churches in Namibia

== Sources ==
- (af) Die Gereformeerde Vroueblad. 1959. Die Gereformeerde vrou 1859–1959. Potchefstroom: Potchefstroom Herald.
