= Selago aspera =

Scientific classification
- Kingdom: Plantae
- Clade: Tracheophytes
- Clade: Angiosperms
- Clade: Eudicots
- Clade: Asterids
- Order: Lamiales
- Family: Scrophulariaceae
- Genus: Selago
- Species: S. aspera

Binomial name
- Selago aspera Choisy

Species of flowering plant

Selago aspera is a species of plant in the family Scrophulariaceae. It is endemic to the southern Cape Provinces, South Africa.

== Description ==
A perennial, woody, loosely-branching shrublet. The branches are pubescent (retrorse hairs c.0,1mm) and bear numerous leaves. On older branches only the leaf-bases remain, giving the stems a rough texture.

The leaves are elliptic in shape, with obtuse tips, and slightly narrowed bases. Their angle is mostly ascending-to-appressed (they can sometimes be spreading-to-recurved lower on the branches). Their texture is glandular-to-smooth, and they are relatively thin, with the midrib somewhat visible on the underside.

The inflorescence is a dense raceme.

== Distribution ==
Selago aspera is mainly confined to the Western Cape Province, where it occurs both north and south of the Langeberg mountain range.

It occurs as far west as Worcester (Brandvlei Kelders). North of the Langeberg it occurs on rocky sandstone substrate from Montagu (Baths), through Barrydale (Warmwaterberg) to near Vanwyksdorp (Gamkaberg).

South of the Langeberg it occurs on limestone substrates from Bredasdorp (Bredasdorppoort), through De Hoop (Wydgelegen), to near Stilbaai.

Further records potentially exist to the east, as far as Sedgefield and Goukamma.
