= Grootfontein Reformed Church =

Congregation of the Reformed Church in Namibia

The Grootfontein Reformed Church is a congregation affiliated with the Reformed Churches in South Africa (GKSA) in Grootfontein, Namibia, founded on May 29, 1943.

== Sources ==
- (af) Harris, C.T., Noëth, J.G., Sarkady, N.G., Schutte, F.M. en Van Tonder, J.M. 2010. Van seringboom tot kerkgebou: die argitektoniese erfenis van die Gereformeerde Kerke. Potchefstroom: Administratiewe Buro.
- (en) Potgieter, D.J. (chief ed.) Standard Encyclopaedia of Southern Africa. Cape Town: Nasionale Opvoedkundige Uitgewery Ltd., 1973.
- (en) Raper, P.E. 1987. Dictionary of South African Place Names. Johannesburg: Lowry Publishers.
- (af) Schalekamp, Dm. M.E. (chairman: edition commission). 2001. Die Almanak van die Gereformeerde Kerke in Suid-Afrika vir die jaar 2002. Potchefstroom: Administratiewe Buro.
- (af) Van der Walt, Dr. S.J. (chairman: almanac deputies). 1997. Die Almanak van die Gereformeerde Kerke in Suid-Afrika vir die jaar 1998. Potchefstroom: Administratiewe Buro.
- (af) Ammi Venter (chief ed.) 1957. Almanak van die Gereformeerde Kerk in Suid-Afrika vir die jaar 1958. Potchefstroom: Administratiewe Buro.
- (af) Venter, Dm. A.A. (chief ed.) 1958. Almanak van die Gereformeerde Kerk in Suid-Afrika vir die jaar 1959. Potchefstroom: Administratiewe Buro.
- (af) Vogel, Willem (ed.). 2014. Die Almanak van die Gereformeerde Kerke in Suid-Afrika vir die jaar 2015. Potchefstroom: Administratiewe Buro.
