= Maltahöhe Reformed Church =

The Maltahöhe Reformed Church is a congregation of the Dutch Reformed Church in South Africa (NGK) in Namibia. In 2010, the congregation had 143 confirmed members and was served jointly with the Bethanie Reformed Church (NGK) by the Rev. Gert Peens. In 2012, the membership had sharply declined to 96 and the Rev. Sarel Visser was helping out with services.

The congregation seceded on October 26, 1946 from the mother church of all the NGK congregations in South West Africa, the Gibeon Reformed Church. Members of the Gibeon Ring Commission, into which the new congregation was classified, were present at the ceremony, including the Revs. S.H. van der Spuy, J.R. Holzapfel, and J.T. Potgieter. At its foundation, the congregation based at Maltahöhe encompassed 30,000 km² including the area of Rehoboth. Despite the large area, there were only 260 members.

The members were so grateful to have their own congregation that they contributed £840 to the collection fund on opening day. After seven unsuccessful interviews, the Rev. H.R. Cilliers, previously of Tierberg and Parow-East, was hired on a second interview with him. He was invested as the first pastor of the church on January 31, 1948, and the following day expounded on Acts 10:7 "Behold, I come -- to do, O Lord, your will."

Before the congregation's church was built, they used a meeting hall in the local town, but the keystone was laid by the Rev. Leonard August 24, 1948, while two other church halls were built in the district. A parsonage was opened on July 6, 1950. In 1950, there were 330 members.

== Select pastors ==
1. Hendrik Rudolf Cilliers, 1948 - 1952, first pastor
2. Gert Stephanus Burgers, 1953 - 1958
3. Gert Andries Johannes Jacobs, March 13, 1965 - 1969
4. Pieter Jacobus van Jaarsveld, 1969 - 1977
5. Erich Dürr Botha, 1977 - 1981
6. Franz Johannes Wilhelm Gottschalk, 1981 - 1982
7. George Frederick de Bruyn, August 19, 1983 - 1986 (later with the Deben Reformed Church)

== Sources ==
- Olivier, ds. P.L. (compiler). 1952. Ons gemeentelike feesalbum. Cape Town/Pretoria: N.G. Kerk-Uitgewers.
