= Encyclopedia of African History =

2004 encyclopedia edited by Kevin Shillington

The Encyclopedia of African History is a three-volume work dedicated to African history. It was edited by Kevin Shillington and published in New York City by Routledge in November 2004. The Library of Congress subjects for this work are Africa, History, and Encyclopedias.

Like most encyclopedias, it is arranged alphabetically, and includes illustrations, maps, a bibliographical reference section and an index. The encyclopedia covers a variety of subjects such as economics, sociology, ethnic studies, and military science.

== See also ==
- Standard Encyclopaedia of Southern Africa
