= Gochas Reformed Church =

Church in Namibia

The Gochas Reformed Church is a congregation of the Dutch Reformed Church in South Africa (NGK), located in Namibia with its capital in the city of Gochas, on the Auob River running through the Kalahari Desert.

At first, the shores of the Auob were malaria-ridden, but people settled there nevertheless. Already in the 1950s, the area was heavily inhabited. There was a military outpost under German rule, given its central location in the Kalahari. The Gochas area started out as a district of the Gibeon Reformed Church, the mother congregation in Namibia that would later be known as Mariental. The Rev. E. J. Leonard had a demanding job covering the whole Southwest from Grootfontein to Warmbad. Later, he was named the pastor of the Gibeon church and therefore worked often in the Gochas district. Conditions were primitive and services were often held outdoors. From 1932, the old camel stable in Gochas, at the time used as a public school site, was used for services. The lack of a dedicated church hall severely hindered services, the old hostel refectory was suggested as an option later. This was an improvement, but the situation remained a concern. Several expeditions left to find suitable sites, only to return disappointed.

Finally, in 1937, the administrator of South West Africa was sympathetic to the congregation's concerns and granted a hectare in Gochas for church grounds. The Rev. Leonard would choose the spot where the church council would be built. After the Rev. Leonard's death, the Rev. T. Potgieter became pastor of Gibeon, and he worked hard to serve the Gochas district and help the construction committee build the church. The keystone was gifted by local Sunday school students, and on October 20, 1946, was laid by the Rev. Potgieter. After enthusiastic organizing and fundraising, the church hall opened on October 23, 1948. The church was full and the members were already discussing secession, which was granted at a combined Gibeon-Gochas congregational meeting. On November 25, 1950, the Gochas congregation was founded, including 320 founding members. The church council was extended to twelve members. The construction fund for the parsonage grew quickly.

== Sources ==
- Olivier, Rev. P.L. (compiler). 1952. Ons gemeentelike feesalbum. Cape Town/Pretoria: N.G. Kerk-Uitgewers.
