= Dutch Reformed Church, Montagu =

Church in Montagu, South Africa

Coordinates: 33°47′12.26″S 20°8′44″E

Dutch Reformed Church
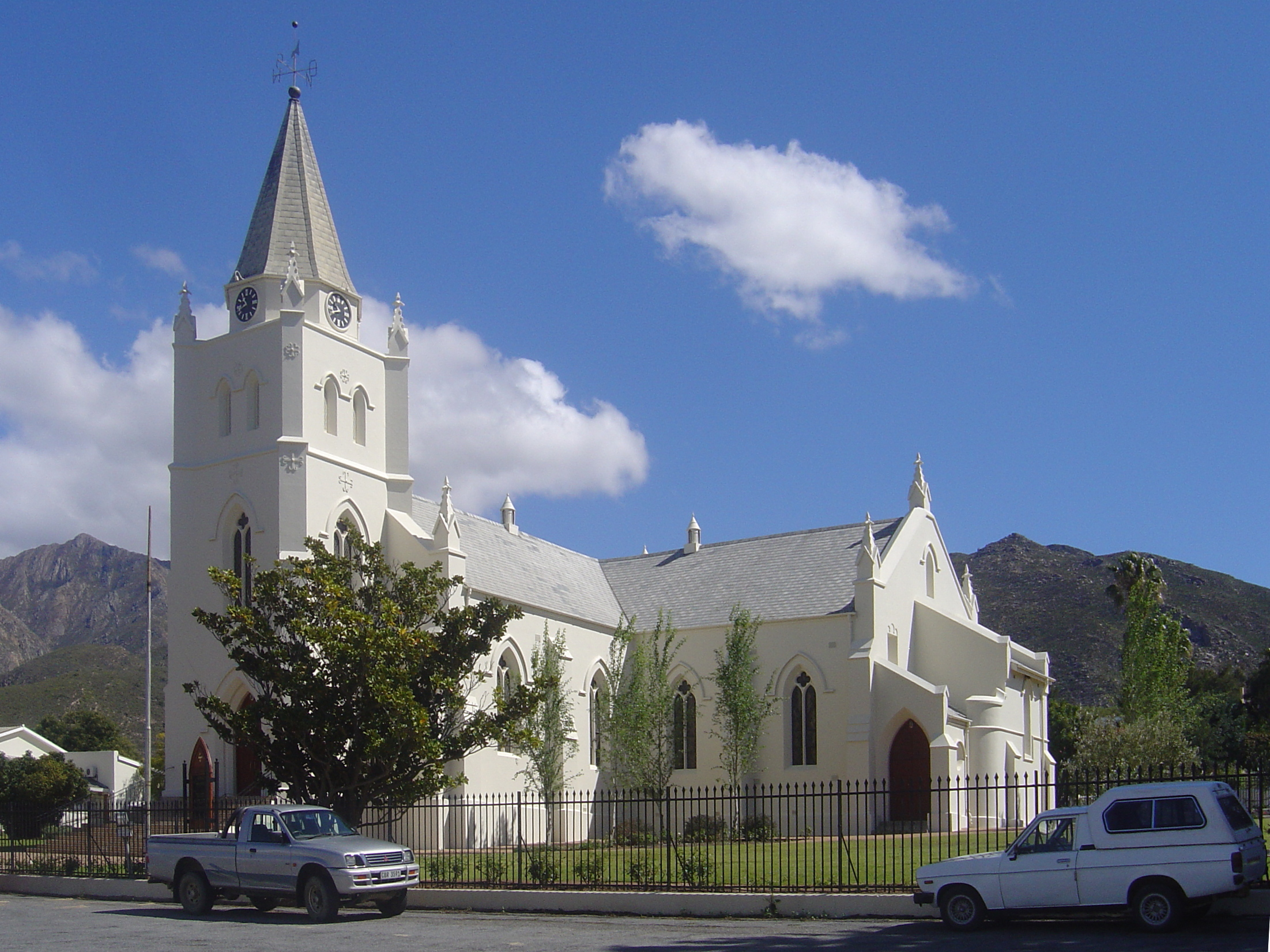
- Dutch Reformed Church
- Location: Montagu
- Country: South Africa
- Denomination: Nederduits Gereformeerde Kerk

History
- Founded: 1854

Architecture
- Functional status: Church

The Dutch Reformed Church in Montagu is a congregation of the Dutch Reformed Church in the Synod of the Western Cape. When it was founded in 1854, it was the 60th congregation of the church, but due to the merger of the congregations of Middelburg, Cape, and Middelburg-Uitsig, it is now (2015) the 59th oldest still existing congregation.

== Background ==
Around 1850 there were already so many members of the Swellendam congregation on the east side of Cogmanskloof in the Langeberge that it was decided to build a "Gesticht" for religious exercises on the farm Uitvlugt of D.S. van der Merwe. With the laying of the cornerstone on 19 April 1851, Dr. William Robertson, minister of Swellendam, expressed the hope that this would be the beginning of a new congregation, which should be named after the then colonial secretary, Sir John Montagu. On 16 October 1854, the Presbytery in session at Caledon proceeded to the secession of the Montagu congregation, and on 30 September 1860 Dr. Servaas Hofmeyr was confirmed as the first minister by his brother, N.J. Hofmeyr, professor at the Seminary. With his confirmation, a blessed revival was already underway.

== Ministers ==
- Dr. Servaas Hofmeyr, 30 September 1860 – 5 December 1888
- George Stephanus Malan, 1889 – 1895
- Johannes Christoffel Truter, 1896 – 1905
- Daniël François Malan, 1906 – 1913
- Daniel Petrus van Huyssteen, 1913 – 1937
- Pieter Albertyn Alheit, 1922 – 1926
- Frederick Rossouw Grobbelaar, 1930 – 1934
- Daniel Johannes Louw, 1938 – 1946
- Anthonie George Eliab van Velden, 1946 – 1951
- Daniel Johannes Malan, 1947 – 1954
- Frederic John Berning Malan, 1951 to 1960 (accepts her emeritus)
- Jaap Weideman
- Philippus Lodewikus Scholtz, 1964 – 1970.
- Leon Maree Steenkamp, 1967 - 1972
- Jozua Van Der Lugt, 1977 - 1994
- Dr. Jacobus Johannes De Jager, 1993 - 2016
- Johannes Petrus Theron, 1995 – 2001
- Charl van Rensburg, 2006 - 2019
- J.A. Theron - April 2016 - Sep 2016
- Dr Hannes Ries - present
- Rupert de Koning, 2021 – present
