= Selago nachtigalii =

Conservation status
- Least Concern (IUCN 3.1)

Scientific classification
- Kingdom: Plantae
- Clade: Tracheophytes
- Clade: Angiosperms
- Clade: Eudicots
- Clade: Asterids
- Order: Lamiales
- Family: Scrophulariaceae
- Genus: Selago
- Species: S. nachtigalii

Binomial name
- Selago nachtigalii Rolfe

Species of flowering plant

Selago nachtigalii is a species of plant in the family Scrophulariaceae. It is endemic to Namibia. Its natural habitat is cold desert.
