= Kevin Shillington =

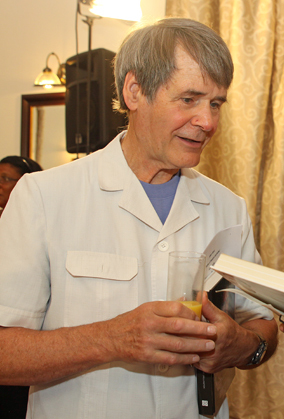
- Kevin Shilington in June 2014
- Education: • Trinity College (undergraduate; 1968) • University of London(Master of Arts; Doctor of Philosophy • University of Zambia
- Occupations: • Academic • Historian

Kevin Shillington is a teacher and a freelance historian based in Dorset, England, United Kingdom.

== Education ==
He graduated from Trinity College, located in Dublin, Ireland, with a major in modern history in 1968. Shillington did his postgraduate teacher training at the University of Zambia, located in Lusaka, Zambia. He holds a MA and PhD in African history from the University of London.

== Career ==
Shillington taught History and English at Secondary School in Zambia in the early 1970s. During the early 1980s, he trained history teachers at the University of Botswana, whose main campus is located in Gaborone, Botswana. From the mid-1980s he has been a freelance historian and biographer, specializing mostly in African History.

=== Bibliography ===
His writing includes:

- The Colonization of the Southern Tswana (1985)
- A Junior Certificate History for Zimbabwe (1986; co-author)
- History of Southern Africa (1987)
- History of Africa (1989)
- Jugnauth: Prime Minister of Mauritius (1991)
- An African Adventure: A Brief Life of Cecil Rhodes (1992)
- Ghana and the Rawlings Factor(1992)
- History of Africa (revised edition, 1995) {Review}
- Causes and Consequences of Independence in Africa (1997)
- Sowing the Mustard Seed: The Struggle for Freedom and Democracy in Uganda (1997; co-editor)
- History of Southern Africa (2nd edition, 2002)
- Encyclopedia of African History (2004; editor)
- Encarta Encyclopedia (contributor)
- History of Africa (2nd revised edition, 2005)
- History of Modern Seychelles (2009)
- Luka Jantjie: Resistance Hero of the South African Frontier (2011)
- History of Africa (3rd revised edition, 2012)
- Albert Rene, the Father of Modern Seychelles. A Biography (2014)
- History of Africa (4th edition, 2019)
- Patrick van Rensburg: Rebel, Visionary and Radical Educationist (2020)
- Charles Warren: Royal Engineer in the Age of Empire (2020)
- Cecil Rhodes: The Man Behind the Statues (2nd edition, revised, 2021)
- Robert Oakeshott: The Quintessential English Eccentric (2023)
- Luka Jantjie: Resistance Hero of the northern Cape (revised and abridged edition, 2024)

== See also ==
- List of historians
- List of people from London
- List of Trinity College Dublin people
- List of University of London people
