= Gobabis Reformed Church =

Congregation of the Reformed Church in Namibia

The Gobabis Reformed Church is a congregation of the Reformed Churches in South Africa (GKSA) in Gobabis in eastern Namibia. Its church opened on August 25, 1952; the architect was Gerard Moerdyk.

== Sources ==
- (af) Harris, C.T., Noëth, J.G., Sarkady, N.G., Schutte, F.M. and Van Tonder, J.M. 2010. Van seringboom tot kerkgebou: die argitektoniese erfenis van die Gereformeerde Kerke. Potchefstroom: Administratiewe Buro.
- (af) Schalekamp, Rev. M.E. (chairman: editing committee). 2001. Die Almanak van die Gereformeerde Kerke in Suid-Afrika vir die jaar 2002. Potchefstroom: Administratiewe Buro.
- (af) Van der Walt, Dr. S.J. (chairman: almanac deputies). 1997. Die Almanak van die Gereformeerde Kerke in Suid-Afrika vir die jaar 1998. Potchefstroom: Administratiewe Buro.
- (af) Ammi Venter (chief ed.) 1957. Almanak van die Gereformeerde Kerk in Suid-Afrika vir die jaar 1958. Potchefstroom: Administratiewe Buro.
- (af) Venter, Rev. A.A. (chief ed.) 1958. Almanak van die Gereformeerde Kerk in Suid-Afrika vir die jaar 1959. Potchefstroom: Administratiewe Buro.
- (af) Vogel, Willem (ed.). 2014. Die Almanak van die Gereformeerde Kerke in Suid-Afrika vir die jaar 2015. Potchefstroom: Administratiewe Buro.
- (af) Vogel, Willem (red.). 2015. Die Almanak van die Gereformeerde Kerke in Suid-Afrika vir die jaar 2016. Potchefstroom: Administratiewe Buro.

== See also ==
- Reformed Churches in Namibia
