= Biermanskool Reformed Church =

The Biermanskool Reformed Church was a congregation of the Reformed Churches in South Africa (GKSA) in Namibia.

== Sources ==
- (af) Kerkgebou staan al 61 jaar, Republikein, 15 April 2010. URL accessed 29 November 2015.
- (af) Harris, C.T., Hannes Noëth, Sarkady, N.G., Schutte, F.M. and Van Tonder, J.M. 2010. Van seringboom tot kerkgebou: die argitektoniese erfenis van die Gereformeerde Kerke. Potchefstroom: Administratiewe Buro.
- (af) Schalekamp, M.E. (chairman: editing commission). 2001. Die Almanak van die Gereformeerde Kerke in Suid-Afrika vir die jaar 2002. Potchefstroom: Administratiewe Buro.
- (af) Van der Walt, S.J. (chairman: almanac deputies). 1997. Die Almanak van die Gereformeerde Kerke in Suid-Afrika vir die jaar 1998. Potchefstroom: Administratiewe Buro.
- (af) Ammi Venter (ed.) 1957. Almanak van die Gereformeerde Kerk in Suid-Afrika vir die jaar 1958. Potchefstroom: Administratiewe Buro.
- (af) Venter, A.A. (chief ed.) 1958. Almanak van die Gereformeerde Kerk in Suid-Afrika vir die jaar 1959. Potchefstroom: Administratiewe Buro.
- (af) Vogel, Willem (ed.). 2014. Die Almanak van die Gereformeerde Kerke in Suid-Afrika vir die jaar 2015. Potchefstroom: Administratiewe Buro.
