= T. O. Honiball =

South African cartoonist

Thomas Ochse Honiball
- T.O. Honiball
- Born: 7 December 1905; Cradock, Cape Colony
- Died: 22 February 1990 (aged 84)
- Known for: Cartoonist
- Notable work: Oom Kaspaas, Jakkals en Wolf, Adoons-Hulle

Thomas Ochse Honiball (1905–1990) was a well known South African cartoonist.

T.O. Honiball (as he was commonly referred to) was born on 7 December 1905 in Cradock, Cape Colony. Honiball attended the well known high school for boys in Stellenbosch, Paul Roos Gymnasium. He originally studied architecture at the University of Cape Town. However, he needed a less structured way to express his artistic capabilities and from 1927 to 1930 he lived in Chicago where he studied commercial art. During this period he was introduced to American cartoons.

On his return to Cape Town he worked in advertising and later as freelance caricaturist and cartoonist. In 1941 he became the political cartoonist for a major Afrikaans newspaper group, and quickly became one of the best known South African cartoon artists.

In addition to his political cartoons he also published the Oom Kaspaas series, wherein Uncle Kaspaas boasts about his colorful past to his "nephew" Nefie - always to be reminded by some unfortunate event of what had really happened. (Note that in Afrikaans "Neef" (diminutive "nefie") can mean either cousin or nephew. "Oom" literally means "uncle", but the contexts determine the significance. "Oom" is used as a form of address informally denoting (possibly affectionate) respect for any older male, whether a relative or stranger. "Neef", and more strongly "Nefie", is used in the converse sense as "(little) nephew". The usage in the Oom Kaspaas books strongly implies nephew, not cousin. On the other hand, it could very well be that Kaspaas and Nefie are not related at all. In the past "neef" was also an Afrikaans term with a wider meaning, used for all one's male peers, and "nefie" an affectionate term for men and boys younger than the speaker, much in the same way as "oom" is still used for older men today.)

Klaas Windvogel, a rather pompous Dutch relative of Adoons, on an extended visit from the Netherlands

He loved to portray animals as having human personalities and qualities, and he produced two series to that effect. Jakkals en Wolf covered the good and bad times of two friends, a jackal and a wolf, while Adoons-Hulle related the experiences of a baboon family from the Magaliesberg. In 1939 he produced Oom Kaspaas, Jakkals en Wolf in 1942, Faan Brand in 1946 and Adoons-Hulle in 1948.

On retiring in 1974, he held his first solo exhibition in Pretoria and continued his political caricatures and cartoons until 1978. He died on 22 February 1990 in Montagu.

== Family ==
He married Iona Boesen in 1934 and they had four children. After Iona's death in 1971, Honiball married Essie de Villiers - Dreyer (Esther Maria Wiese) in 1973, later known as Essie Honiball.
