= Keetmanshoop Private School =

School in Namibia

Keetmanshoop Private School (Afrikaans: Keetmanshoop Privaatskool), located in Keetmanshoop in southern Namibia, is an Afrikaans-speaking, Christian private school registered with Namibia's Ministry of Education. The school was founded in 1996 with the aim of "preparing (in a dynamic manner and from a Christian basis) pupils in all fields to stand out as full citizens in society and to provide high-quality education and education in the most affordable way to pupils." In 2013, the school had about 250 students from grades 1 through 12 taught by 19 teachers. There were also two secretaries. The school has hostel facilities where learners can live in a safe environment and warm domestic atmosphere.

== History ==
The need for a private school arose around Keetmanshoop in 1994 because a large group of parents did not agree fully with the state education system at that time. One of the biggest concerns was that Afrikaans was being phased out in favor of English as a language of instruction in the state schools, regardless of the learner's home language. In March 1995, the first group of 15 parents led by Dawie O'Callaghan gathered and contemplated the matter. There was no opposition to other local schools, teachers, children attending secondary schools, or any managerial staff, but parents wanted guarantees regarding language, religion, values, discipline, availability of trained teachers, university admission and other aspects. The parents especially wanted to establish a school in which they could have full participation. The school is struggling to accommodate every parent enrolling there. The Keetmanshoop Private School officially opened on 16 January 1996 with 21 grade 8 pupils and a pre-primary class with 15 children.

== School Song ==
The lyrics and music are both by Wilna Liebenberg.

Lig is lewe,

Dis ons leuse By die Keetmanshoop Privaatskool God ons Alfa en Omega Waak oor 'n ieder en 'n elk

In die Suide met sy kokerboom En sy dor-vaal vlaktes Leer ons hier van dissipline, Van 'n liefde vir volk en taal Leer ons hier van Onse Vader Van gee, van deel en werk.

God ons anker in die lewe Waak oor ons dag en nag

Lig is lewe Dis ons leuse

By die Keetmanshoop Privaatskool.

Light is life,

It's our motto At the Keetmanshoop Private School God our Alpha and Omega Watch over each and every one

In the South with its quiver tree And its dry plains Teach us here about discipline, From a love of people and language Teach us here of Our Father Giving, sharing and working.

God our anchor in life Watch over us day and night

Light is life It's our motto

At the Keetmanshoop Private School.

== Sports ==
Several KPS students have won national colors in tennis, hockey, rugby, netball and cricket over the years. The school uses the large stadium that is owned by the municipality and where KPS decided in 2010 to build two netball courts used by the community. By 2013, there were four netball courts, two rugby courts, one hockey track and an athletics track. Learners can participate outdoors in golf, horse riding, gymnastics, modern dance, swimming and Voortrekkers. KPS uses parents and teachers to coach sports.

KPS's learners compete annually at the Private School Athletics Meeting against athletes from most other private schools in Namibia, including Berg-Op Academy (Okahandja), Mauritz Devenish Private School (Ongwediva), Deutsche Schule Grootfontein, Otjiwarongo Christian School, The Dolphin Schools (Walvis Bay), Privatschule Otjiwarongo, Edugate Academy (Otjiwarongo), Swakopmund Private School, Elnatan Private School, Pro-Ed Academy (Swakopmund), Excelsior (Aroab), Rosh Pinah Academy, Grootfontein Agri College, International School of Whale Bay, Tsumeb Gymnasium, Walvis Bay Private High School, Moria Private School, Welwitschia (Windhoek) and Windhoek Afrikaans Private School.
