= Outjo Reformed Church (NGK) =

The Outjo Reformed Church is a congregation of the Dutch Reformed Church in South Africa (NGK) in northwestern Namibia.

The congregation was founded on November 13, 1943, with 329 confirmed and 600 total members seceding from its mother church, the Otjiwarongo Reformed Church (NGK). The first church council included seven elders and seven deacons. Otjiwarongo contributed £500 toward a church hall in Outjo. Collections brought the total to over £1,000. The first pastor, the Rev. S.H. van der Spuy (earlier curate at the Windhoek Reformed Church (NGK)), was invested on April 15, 1944. Notwithstanding 22 posts, he served the congregation until 1952.

Outjo was, after the secession of the Kamanjab Reformed Church (NGK) in 1953, the northwesternmost congregation of the Cape Church, with a footprint larger than Free State province. Bordered on the north by Angola and on the west by the Skeleton Coast, it included the Kaokoveld and Ovamboland. Among the natural wonders included was the Vingerklip (a rock formation), the Versteende Woud (a petrified forest, the Terrasse, and the Etosha pan where lions, giraffes, gemsboks, wildebeests, zebras, and springboks roam and large numbers of frogs croak in the waterless basin. The Kaokoveld was heavily scarred by mining concessions at the time

In the 1920s, Outjo consisted of 20 dilapidated houses dating to German rule and a school with one teacher and 20 pupils. A small hotel lobby hosted services held by an elder and a deacon for the Outjo district of the Moria congregation, which would later become the Otjiwarongo Reformed Church. In 1952, Outjo had around 200 buildings, including some very modern ones, such as a magistracy, post office, hospital, church, cheese dairy, cream depot, and school and dormitory buildings for around 500 children taught by 20 teachers. The high school building was finished around this time, and the town boasted its own power plant and three commercial banks.

The Outjo congregation then had 14 elders and 16 deacons serving 16 districts, with 793 members and 1,350 souls (including children and unconfirmed people). The congregation outgrew its meeting hall and began raising money to build a new church in the early 1950s. In 2010, the membership had reduced to 284 confirmed and 93 baptized members, but those numbers had rebounded to 323 and 114 respectively.

== Select pastors ==
- Stephanus Hofmeyr van der Spuy, 1944 - ?
- Johannes Matthys Burger, 1952 - 1954
- Albertus Johannes Etsebeth, 1958 - 1975

== Sources ==
- Olivier, ds. P.L. (compiler). 1952. Ons gemeentelike feesalbum. Cape Town/Pretoria: N.G. Kerk-Uitgewers.

== See also ==
- Outjo Reformed Church (GKSA)
