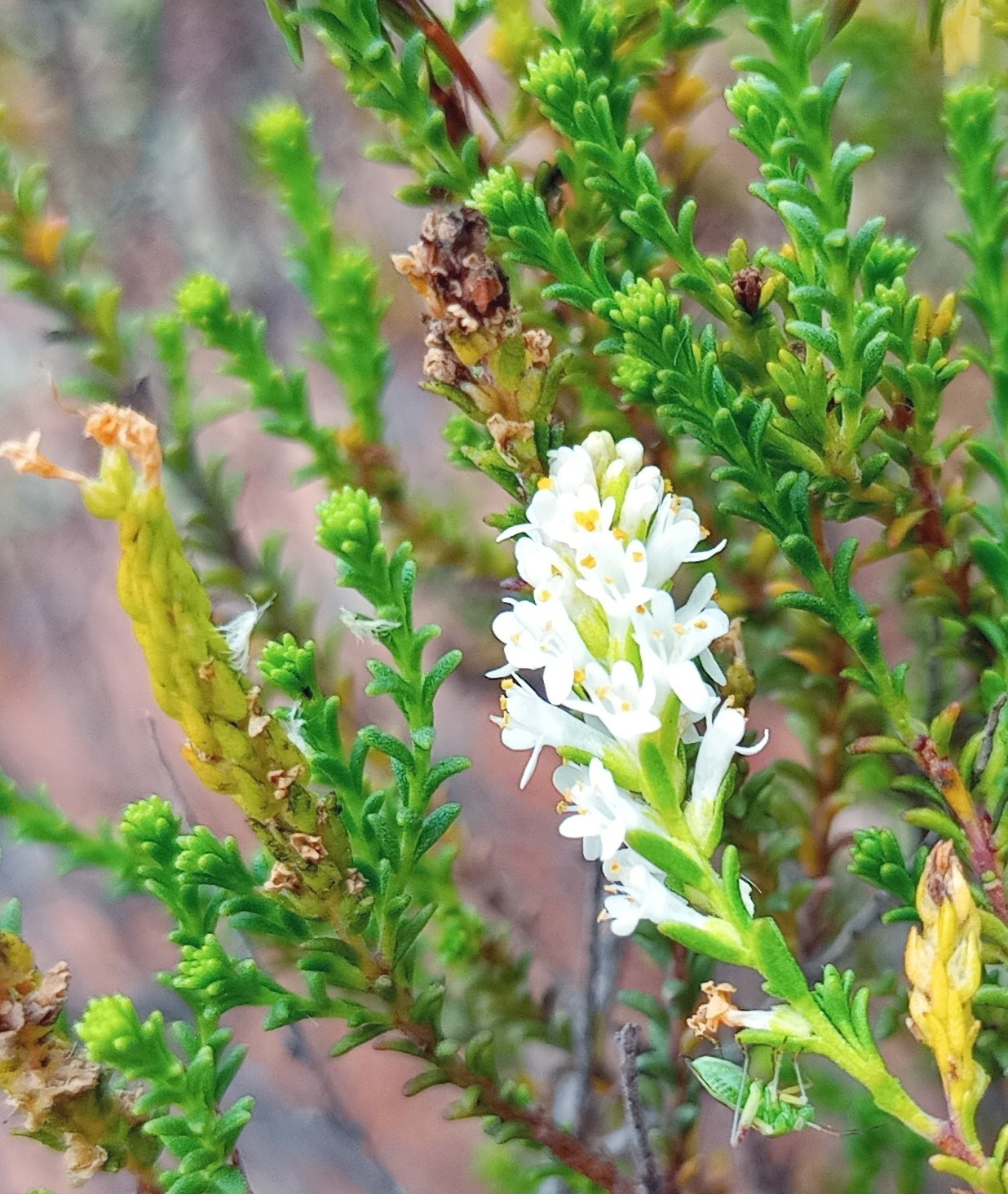

Scientific classification
- Kingdom: Plantae
- Clade: Tracheophytes
- Clade: Angiosperms
- Clade: Eudicots
- Clade: Asterids
- Order: Lamiales
- Family: Scrophulariaceae
- Genus: Selago
- Species: S. triquetra

Binomial name
- Selago triquetra L.f.

= Selago triquetra =

Species of flowering plant

Selago triquetra is a species of plant in the family Scrophulariaceae. It is endemic to Western Cape Province, South Africa.

It has spreading-recurved leaves. Both its leaves and bracts are obtuse. It occurs from Piketberg to Montagu.
