= Mariental Reformed Church (NGK) =

The Mariental Reformed Church is the oldest congregation of the Dutch Reformed Church in South Africa (NGK) in Namibia and was founded in 1898 as the Gibeon Reformed Church.

The Rev. E.J. Leonard, after whom the Leonard Reformed Church in Leonardville, Namibia, is named, was the first pastor of the congregation and for a number of years covered all of what was then South West Africa (SWA). After the foundation of the Moria Reformed Church, later known as the Otjiwarongo Reformed Church (NGK), the Mariental congregation still covered the whole southern half of Namibia. Keetmanshoop was the next to secede in 1924, but even after that separation, Mariental still covered an area as large as the entire Orange Free State. Three more congregations seceded in quick succession from 1944 onward: Leonard (1944), Maltahöhe (1946), and Gochas (1950). Even after all this, there were still five additional districts where the congregation held services outside of Mariental proper.

The name Gibeon derives from a small village that eventually became a suburb of Mariental.

The Rev. Leonard obtained the status of pastor once more in 1932. Until 1938, he worked there alone, but the Rev. T.J. Potgieter joined him as co-pastor the latter year. He remained with the congregation until October 1947. In August 1948, the Rev. M.N. van Rensburg served the congregation.

Gibeon was the first congregation of the NGK in SWA to do missionary work among the Cape Colored who had emigrated there from the Union of South Africa. The congregation spent £600 a year as of 1952 on local missionary work.

== Select pastors ==
1. Pieter Jacobus Conradie, 1904 - 1905
2. Charl Wynand Retief, 1909 - 1911
3. Karel Wynand le Roux, 1925 - 1929, then with the Windhoek Reformed Church (NGK) until 1946, when he accepted his emeritus
4. Edward Johannes Leonard, 1932 - January 20, 1939 (died in office)
5. Johannes Theodorus Potgier, 1939 (apparently left for Okahandja the same year)
6. Michael Nicolaas Janse van Rensburg, 1948 - ?
7. Nicolaas Johannes Mostert, 1952 - 1958
8. Andreas Gerhardus du Toit, 1957 - 1960
9. Ernst Hendrik van den Berg, 1960 - 1962
10. Daniël Christiaan Esterhuyse, 1968 - 1975
11. Jacobus Petrus Jooste, 2012 - 2013 (died in office)

== Sources ==
- Olivier, ds. P. L. (compiler). 1952. Ons gemeentelike feesalbum. Cape Town/Pretoria: N.G. Kerk-Uitgewers.
