= Reformed Churches in Namibia =

Church in Namibia

The Reformed Churches in Namibia is a Reformed church in Namibia. Reformed people come from Angola to Namibia in 1929. The Dorslandtrekkers were mostly Reformed people who had settled in Angola but later moved to Namibia. The Dorslandtrekkers were originally from Transvaal, South Africa, and migrated northwestward starting in 1874 in two large and one smaller group, starting the Humpata Reformed Church under the Rev. Jan Lion Cachet. Later in 1930 3 congregations were established. More farmers came and the church grew. Missionary work was started in 1969 under the Bushmans of the Gobabis region, Botswana. It has 2,757 members and 14 congregations, and adheres to the Apostles Creed, Nicene Creed, Heidelberg Catechism, Belgic Confession and the Canons of Dort.There's no women ordination. Official languages are Afrikaans, Bushman, Gobabis-Kung.

== Bibliography ==
- (af) Jooste, Prof. Dr. J.P. 1959. Die Geskiedenis van die Gereformeerde Kerk in Suid-Afrika 1859–1959. Potchefstroom: Administratiewe Buro van die Gereformeerde Kerk.
- (en) Potgieter, D.J. (ed.) 1972. Standard Encyclopaedia of Southern Africa. Cape Town: Nasionale Opvoedkundige Uitgewery Beperk.
- (af) Stassen, Nicol. 2009. Afrikaners in Angola 1928–1975. Pretoria: Protea Boekhuis.
- (af) Swart, Dr. M.J. (chairman: editing committee). 1980. Afrikaanse kultuuralmanak. Auckland Park: Federasie van Afrikaanse Kultuurvereniginge.
- (af) Viljoen, Lood (chairman). 2005. 75-jarige feesvieringe van die Gereformeerde kerk Gobabis 1930–2005. Gobabis: Gereformeerde Kerkraad.
- (af) Vogel, Rev. Willem. 2013. Die Almanak van die Gereformeerde Kerke in Suid-Afrika vir die jaar 2014. Potchefstroom: Administratiewe Buro.
