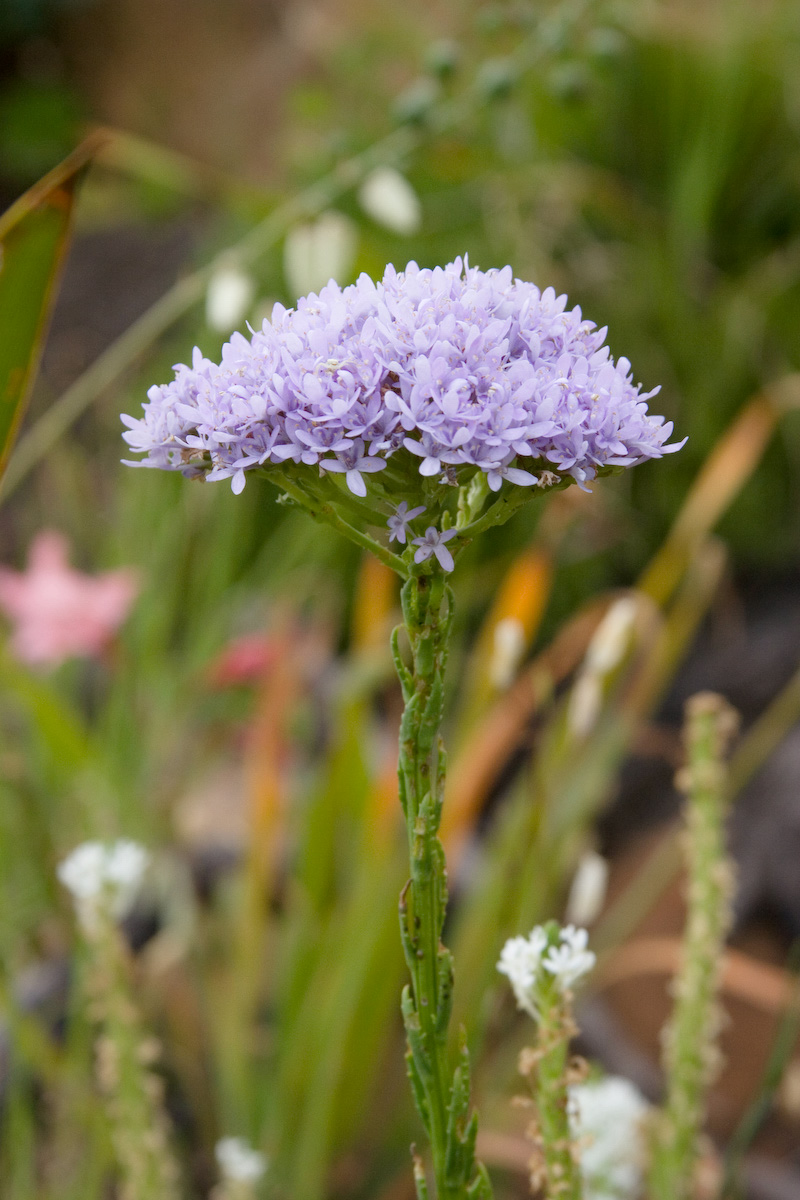
- Selago spuria

Scientific classification
- Kingdom: Plantae
- Clade: Tracheophytes
- Clade: Angiosperms
- Clade: Eudicots
- Clade: Asterids
- Order: Lamiales
- Family: Scrophulariaceae
- Tribe: Limoselleae
- Genus: Selago; L.

Synonyms
- Camphorata Fabr. (1759); Kuritis Raf. (1837); Macria (E.Mey.) Spach (1840); Manettia Boehm. (1760), nom. rej.; Noltia Eckl. ex Steud. (1841), pro syn.; Pechuelia Kuntze (1886); Vormia Adans. (1763); Walafrida E.Mey. (1838)

= Selago =

Genus of flowering plants

Selago is a genus of plants in the family Scrophulariaceae, closely related to Scrophularia and Verbascum. It contains around 190 species, mostly in southern Africa, ranging from Kenya and Democratic Republic of the Congo to South Africa, and including Madagascar.

Two species are listed on the IUCN Red List:

- Selago lepida Hilliard
- Selago nachtigalii Rolfe
