= Standard Encyclopaedia of Southern Africa =

Standard Encyclopædia of Southern Africa
- Editors: Volumes 1–7; Dirk J. Potgieter (editor-in-chief) Volumes 8–12: J. J. Spies; P. C. du Plessis
- Language: English
- Subjects: Biography; Popular culture; Regional history; Ecology; Geography; et al.
- Published: 1971–1976 (Nasou)
- Publication place: South Africa
- Media type: Print
- OCLC: 556727496
- Dewey Decimal: 916.8/03
- LC Class: DT729 .S7

The Standard Encyclopædia of Southern Africa (SESA) is a 12-volume encyclopaedia that is principally about the Republic of South Africa and nearby countries. About 1,400 people contributed to the encyclopaedia. The first two volumes were published in August 1970; the 12th and final volume was published in September 1976.

== Scope ==
Originally, SESA was to be written in Afrikaans, to focus entirely on South Africa, and to be published in six volumes. However, not only did this significantly limit the target market, many of the encyclopaedia's writers submitted their copy in English. The publishers decided to prioritise an English-language edition, and to expand the scope of the encyclopaedia to encompass all of the African countries in the Southern Hemisphere. (Eventually, the Afrikaans edition was abandoned.)

Regions of Africa: Northern Africa Western Africa Central Africa Eastern Africa Southern Africa

Although South Africa remains the central focus, the scope of the encyclopaedia extends through the Southern African countries of Angola, Botswana, Eswatini, Lesotho, Madagascar, Mozambique, Rhodesia, South West Africa, Tanzania, and Zambia, into the Central and East African countries of Burundi, Kenya, Rwanda, Uganda, and Zaire.

Owing to an editorial decision, all of the biographies in the encyclopaedia are about people who were deceased at the time of writing.

== Editing and publication ==
SESA was published by the Nasionale Opvoedkundige Uitgewery (National Educational Publishing House) in Cape Town, under their trading name, Nasou. Nasou was an educational publishing subsidiary of media conglomerate Naspers.

The editor-in-chief of the first seven volumes of the encyclopaedia was Dirk Jacobus Potgieter, who had previously co-edited the fifth edition of Afrikaans for English-speaking Students (1949) and an Afrikaans/English bilingual dictionary for Juta & Co. When Nasou reused some of the encyclopaedia's material for a book called Animal Life in Southern Africa (1971), Potgieter was a compiler and co-editor on the project, along with fellow SESA editor P. C. du Plessis and entomologist Sydney Skaife. Nasou published the seventh volume of the encyclopaedia in 1972, and du Plessis and J. J. Spies assumed general editorship for the remaining five volumes.

Some years after the publication of the final volume, Nasou was acquired by a holding company, and was merged with South African publisher Via Afrika (est. 1949). The new company, Nasou Via Afrika, is a publisher for the education market.

=== Publication history ===
- Volume 1: Aan-Bac (1970)
- Volume 2: Bac-Cal (1970)
- Volume 3: Cal-Dev (1971)
- Volume 4: Dev-For (1971)
- Volume 5: For-Hun (1972)
- Volume 6: Hun-Lit (1972)
- Volume 7: Lit-Mus (1972)
- Volume 8: Mus-Pop (1973)
- Volume 9: Pop-Sla (1973)
- Volume 10: Sle-Tun (1974)
- Volume 11: Tur-Zwe (1975)
- Volume 12: Supplement and Index (1976)

=== Related publications ===
In addition to Animal Life in Southern Africa (1971), Nasou published another book that made use of the encyclopaedia research: English and South Africa, edited by Alan Lennox-Short (a senior lecturer at the University of Cape Town). However, when they released the book in 1973, the Cape Times criticised them for showing overwhelming bias in favour of White writers. The first seven chapters of the book, which have generic titles such as "Poetry", are devoted to White South African writers. The eighth chapter, "Coloured and African Writing in English", was for non-Whites.

== See also ==
- Encyclopedia of African History (2004)
- Culture of South Africa
- Politics of South Africa
- Bantu peoples in South Africa
- History of South Africa
- History of Southern Africa
- History of Africa
