= Montagu, South Africa =

Montagu
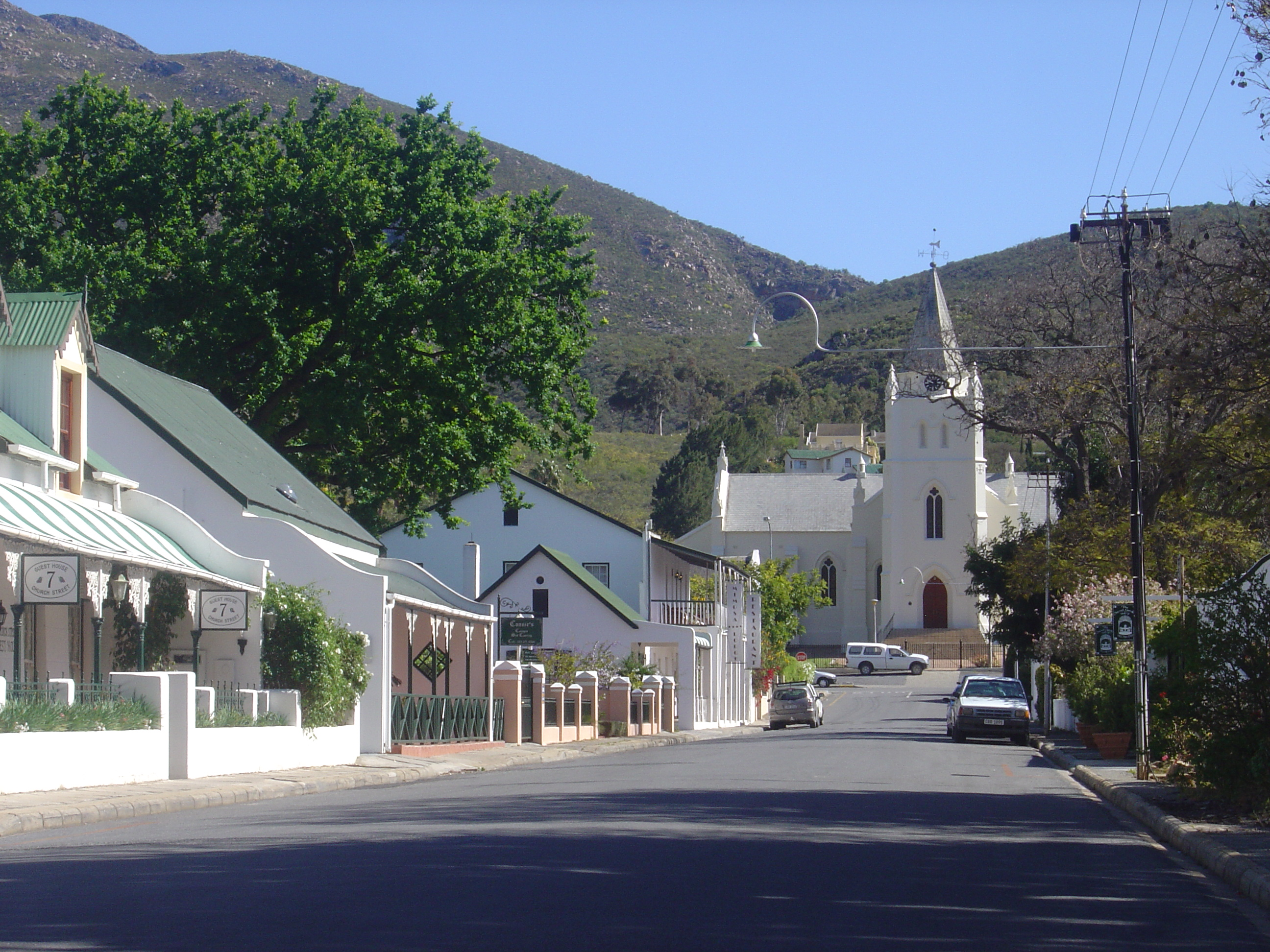
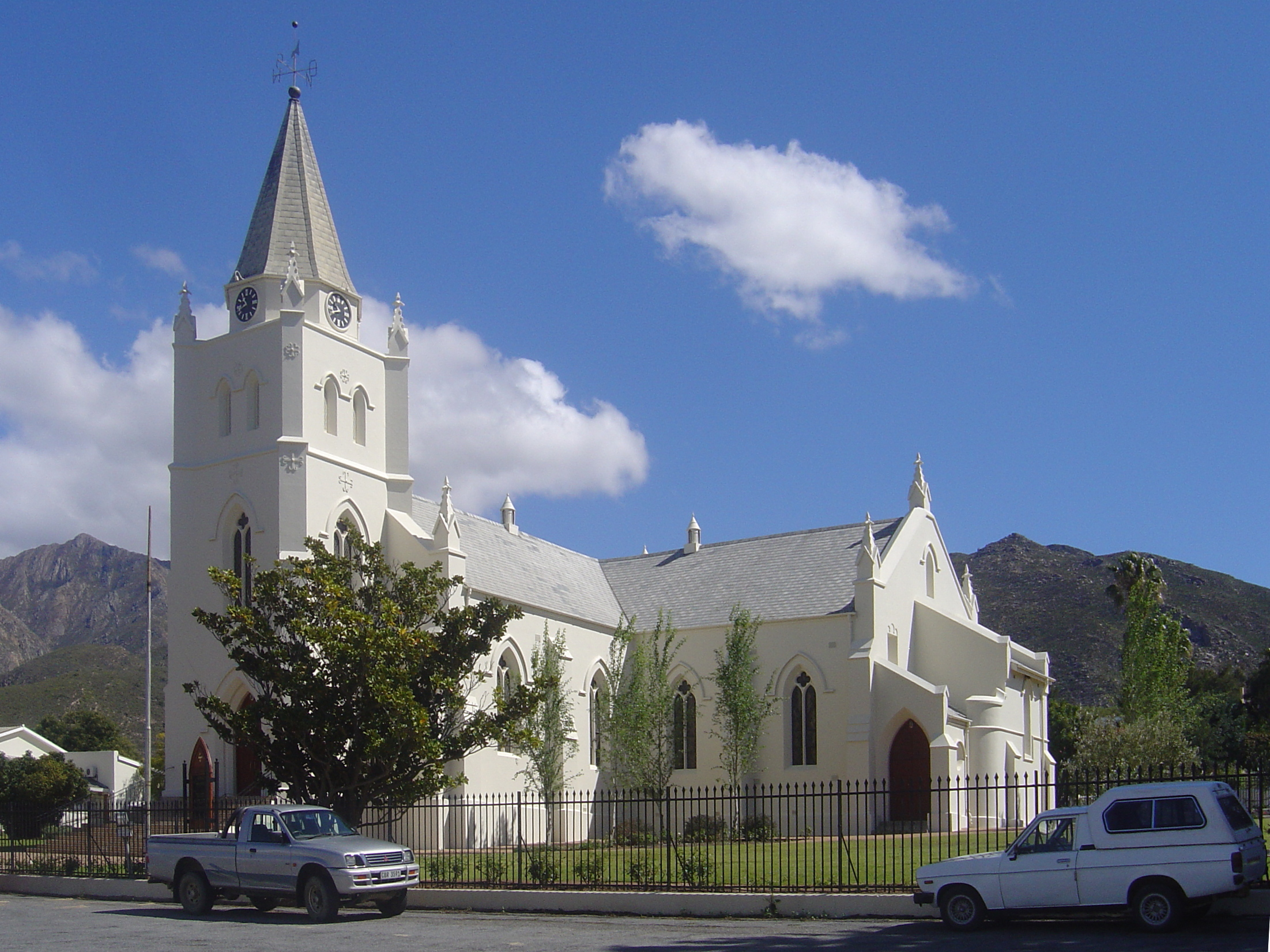
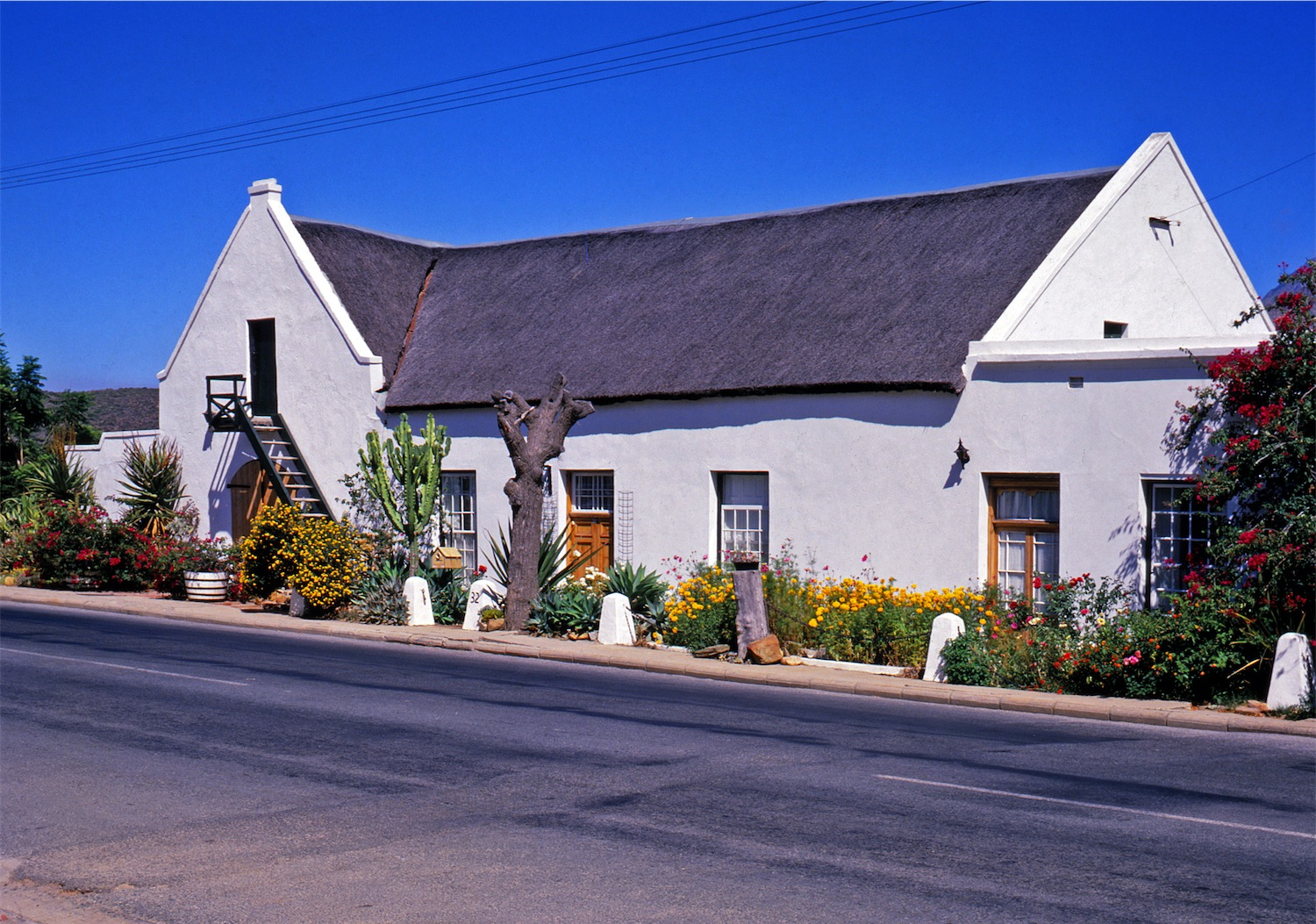
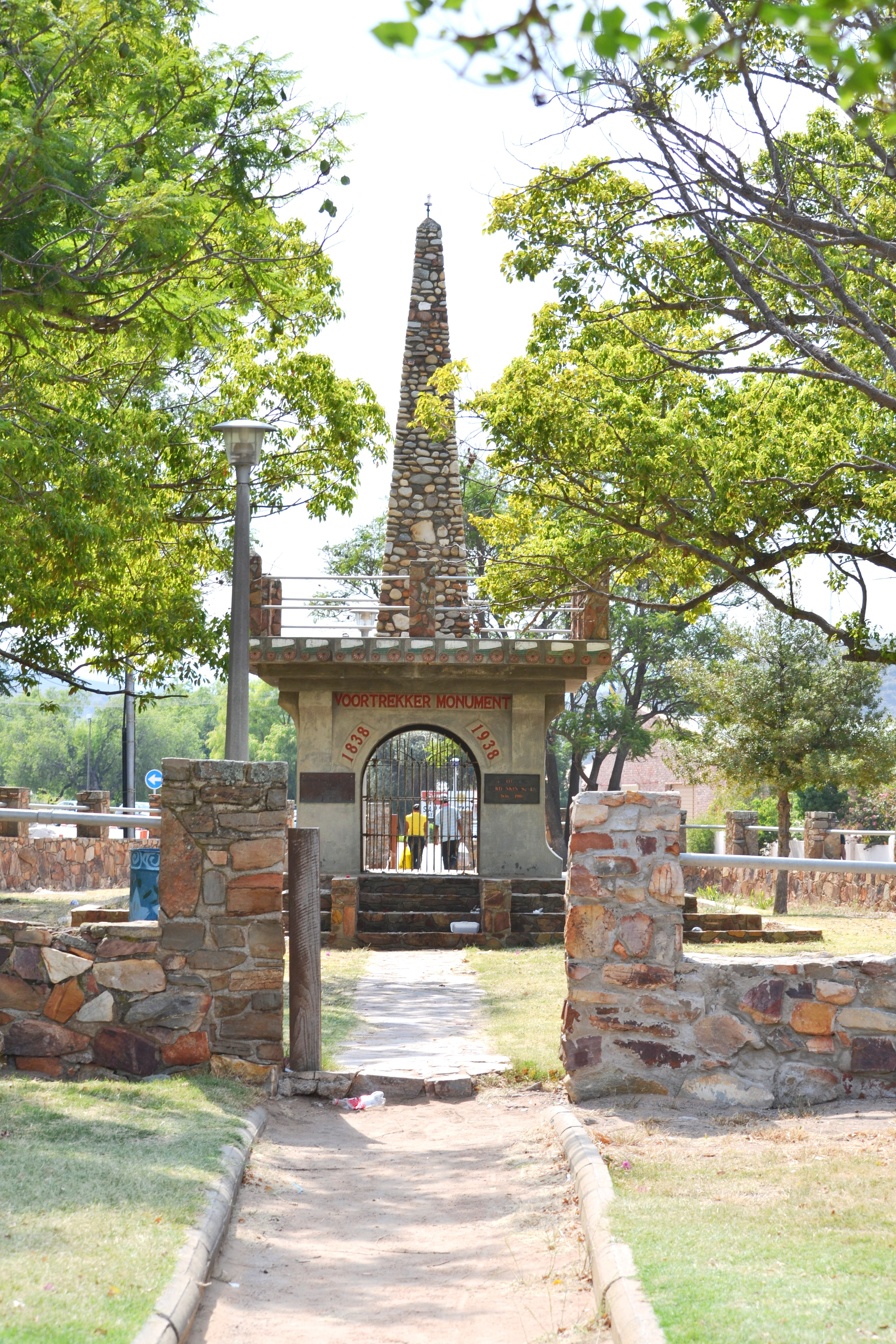
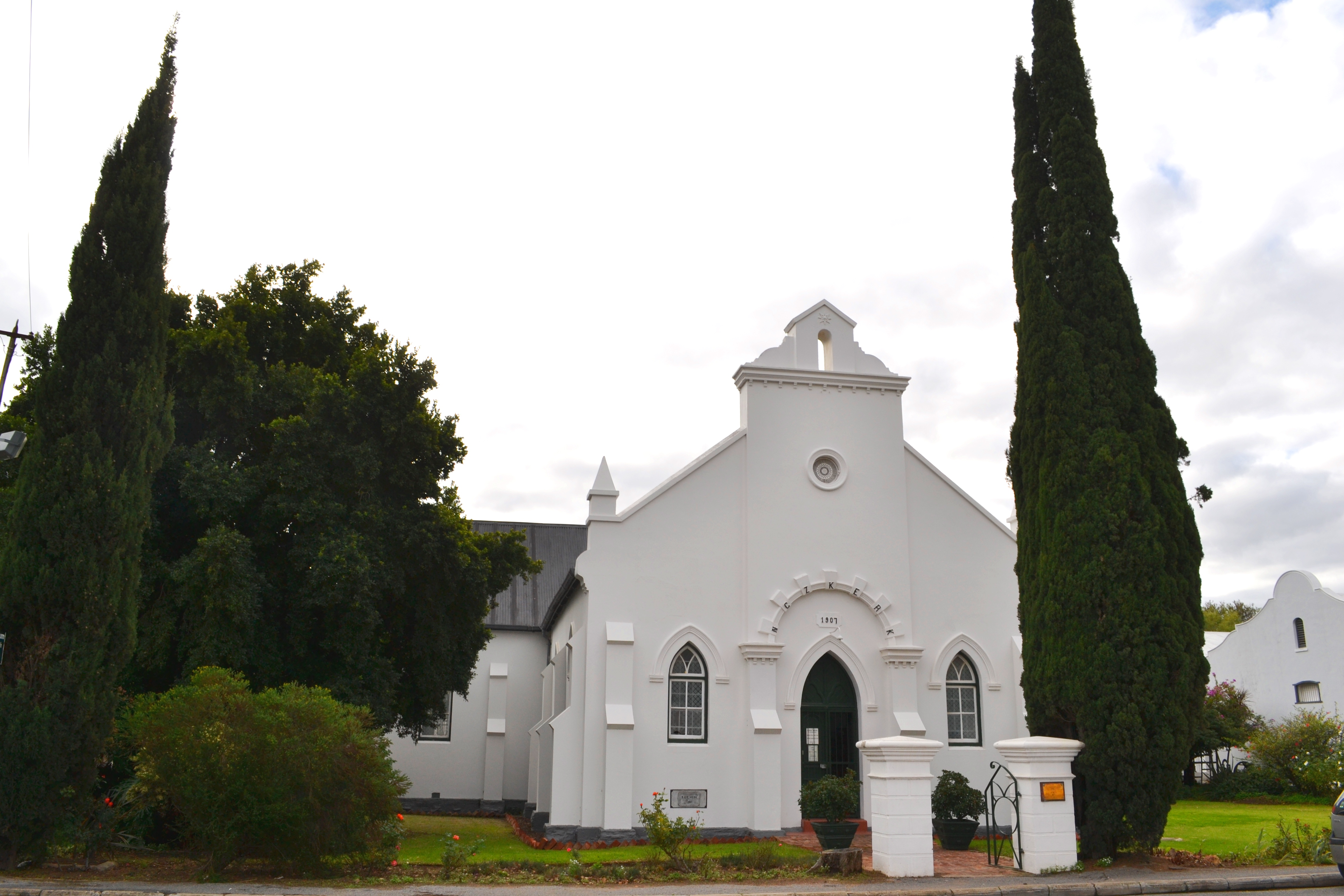
- Clockwise from the top: A view down the main street in Montagu, an historic home, Montagu Museum, Great Trek Monument, the Montagu Dutch Reformed Church.

- Location within Western Cape Location within South Africa
- Coordinates: 33°47′S 20°7′E
- Country: South Africa
- Province: Western Cape
- District: Cape Winelands
- Municipality: Langeberg
- Established: 1856

Area
  - Total: 32.71 km^{2} (12.63 sq mi)

Population (2011)
  - Total: 15,176
  - Density: 464.0/km^{2} (1,202/sq mi)

Racial makeup (2011)
  - Black African: 6.4%
  - Coloured: 75.7%
  - Indian/Asian: 0.5%
  - White: 16.4%
  - Other: 1.0%

First languages (2011)
  - Afrikaans: 91.2%
  - English: 5.5%
  - Xhosa: 1.5%
  - Other: 1.9%
- Time zone: UTC+2 (SAST)
- Postal code (street): 6720
- PO box: 6720
- Area code: 023
- Website: https://www.montagu-ashton.info

Montagu is a town in the Western Cape province of South Africa, about 180 kilometres (110 mi) from Cape Town in the Western Little Karoo.

The town is named after former secretary of the Cape Colony, John Montagu, but was once known as Agter Cogman's Kloof, Cogman's Kloof linking the town and railway station. It is situated at the confluence of the Keisie and Kingna rivers.

Montagu was founded on the farm "Uitvlugt" in 1851, and is known for its hot mineral springs and scenic mountains. It is also an agricultural centre, where orchards and vineyards are in production and local herbs are grown. The farming area, 'Koo', lies north of the town and is famous for the quality of its apples, pears, apricots and peaches.

== Recreation ==
Nearby rock formations make it one of the country's major rock climbing venues. The 1,266 m (4,154 ft) high Bloupunt peak overlooks the village and offers several hiking trails, as well as kloofing and mountain biking trails further afield.

Popular crags for rock climbing include Legoland, The Steeple and Bad Kloof.

== Location ==
Montagu is near the Robertson Wine Valley and is most easily reached via the Route 62 scenic route.

== Notable residents ==
- Pastor Emeritus Matthys du Toit was born in Montagu.
- The author Francis Brett Young spent his final years in Montagu.
- Jonathan Jansen, academic and former rector of the University of the Free State.

== See also ==
- Montagu Museum
- Montagu Pass
