= List of mountain ranges of South Africa =

List of mountain ranges

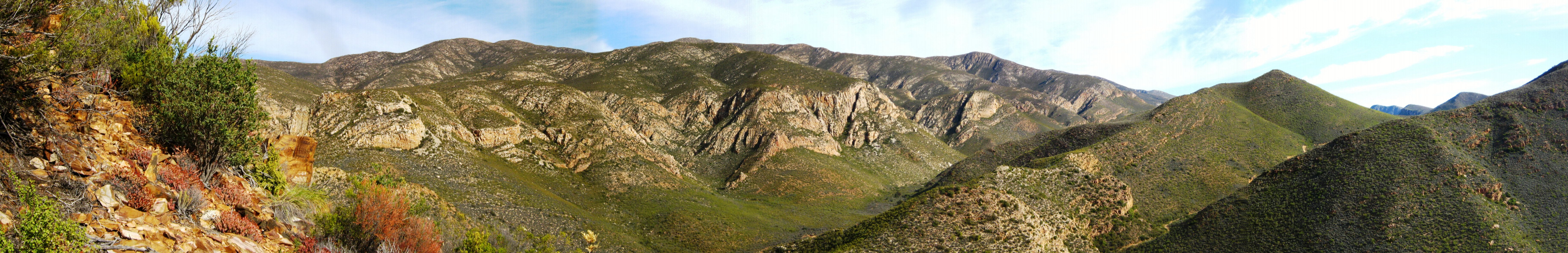
Panorama of the Baviaanskloof mountain range

This is a list of mountain ranges of South Africa.

== Physiography ==
The list includes chains of mountains bordered by highlands or separated from other mountains by passes or valleys. Some ranges in South Africa are relatively isolated, while others are physiographically part of larger geographical ranges such as the Drakensberg.

== Geology ==
Individual mountains within the same mountain range do not necessarily have the same geology; for example, in the Witwatersrand there is Pilanesberg, a mountain having a different orogeny from the main range and its subranges.

Geologically, many ranges are part of the Cape Fold Belt system, a wide geological system that also includes the Drakensberg.

== List of mountain ranges of South Africa ==
Name of Range	English translation	Location	Length (km)	Highest elevation (m)	Remarks
Amatola Mountains (also known as Knysna-Amatola)	Calves (in Xhosa)	Eastern Cape, Western Cape			
Asbestos Mountains	named for minerals mined	Northern Cape			
Balelesberge	Balele Mountains	KwaZulu-Natal			
Bamboesberg	named for Thamnocalamus tessellatus	Eastern Cape			An outlier of the Drakensberg Mountains
Bankberg	Bank Mountains	Eastern Cape			
Baviaanskloof berge	Baboon's Gorge Mountains	Eastern Cape			
Blouberg	Blue Mountains	Limpopo			
Bronberge	Source/Well Mountains	Gauteng			
Cederberg	Ceder Mountains	Western Cape			
Drakensberg called Maloti Mountains in Lesotho	Dragons Mountains	Eastern Cape, Free State, KwaZulu-Natal			This range is made up of the "High Berg" basalt range, and the "Small Berg" sandstone range.
Drakenstein	Dragons stone Mountains	Western Cape		1,590 m (5,220 ft)	Part of the Cape Fold Belt system
Du Toitskloof	Du Toit's Canyon	Western Cape		1,995 m (6,545 ft)	Part of the Cape Fold Belt system
Gatsrand	Hole Ridge	Gauteng			
Groot Swartberge	Great Black Mountains	Western Cape			
Groot Winterhoekberge	Great Winter Corner Mountains	Western Cape			
Hawekwa Berge	Hawequa Mountains - Khoi word meaning "the man in the mountain"	Western Cape			North of the Du Toitskloof Range. Part of the Cape Fold Belt System
Hex River Mountains	Witch River Mountains	Western Cape			Part of the Cape Fold Belt system
Hottentots-Holland	(Hottentot: old name for Khoi aboriginal inhabitants)	Western Cape		1,590 m (5,220 ft)	Part of the Cape Fold Belt system
Kammanassieberge	Kammanassie Mountains	Western Cape		1,995 m (6,545 ft)	
Kamiesberge	Jumbled Mountains	Northern Cape		1,706 m (5,597 ft)	
Kareeberge	Karoo Mountains	Western Cape			
Kleinrivier Mountains	Small River Mountains	Western Cape			Part of the Cape Fold Belt system
Kogelberg	Bullet, or cone-shaped Mountains	Western Cape			Part of the Cape Fold Belt system
Komsberg	Rough mountain (in Khoekhoen)	Eastern Cape			Part of the Drakensberg system
Koranna Mountains	named after a tribe	Northwest			
Kouebokkeveld Mountains	Cold Bucks Field Mountains	Western Cape			
Kouga Mountains	named after the Kouga River (‘hippos’)	Eastern Cape			Part of the Cape Fold Belt system
Langeberg	Long Mountains	Western Cape		2,075 m (6,808 ft)	Part of the Cape Fold Belt system
Langkloof Mountains	Long Valley/Gap Mountains	Western Cape			Part of the Cape Fold Belt system
Lebombo Mountains	Big nose (in Zulu)	from KwaZulu-Natal to Limpopo			
Magaliesberg	Mogale's Mountain	North West			
Murchison Range	named after a prospector	Limpopo			
Nuweveldberge	New Field Mountains	Western Cape			Part of the Drakensberg system
Olifants River Mountains	Elephant's River Mountains	Western Cape			Part of the Cape Fold Belt system
Onverwacht series	Unexpected Mountains	Limpopo			
Outeniqua	They who bear honey, Mountains	Western Cape			Part of the Cape Fold Belt system
Piketberg	Picket Mountains	Western Cape			Part of the Cape Fold Belt system
Rietfonteinrand	Reed Fountain Ridge	Gauteng			
Riviersonderend Mountains	River without end Mountains	Western Cape			Part of the Cape Fold Belt system
Roggeveld Mountains	Rye Field Mountains	Northern Cape			
Rooiberg	Red Mountains	Rooiberg			
Simonsberg	Simon's Mountains	Western Cape			Part of the Cape Fold Belt system
Skurweberge	Rough or scaly Mountains	Western Cape			Part of the Cape Fold Belt system
Sneeuberge	Snow Mountains	Eastern Cape			
Soutpansberg	Saltpan Mountain	Limpopo			
Steenkampsberg	Steenkamp's Mountain	Mpumalanga			
Stettynsberge	Stettyn's Mountains	Western Cape			Part of the Cape Fold Belt system
Stormberg Mountains	Storm Mountains	Eastern Cape			Part of the Drakensberg system
Strydpoort Mountains	Battle Gate Mountains	Limpopo			
Suikerbosrand	Sugar Bush Ridge	Gauteng			
Suurberg	Sour Mountains	Eastern Cape			Part of the Drakensberg system
Swartberg	Black Mountains	Western Cape			Part of the Cape Fold Belt system
Table Mountain Group	a mesa (tableland)	Western Cape			
Tsitsikamma Mountains	Place of Much Water Mountains	Eastern Cape and Western Cape			Part of the Cape Fold Belt system
Waterberg [Rooiberg] (Waterberge)	Water Mountain Massif (Water Mountains)	Limpopo			
Winterberg	Winter Mountains	Eastern Cape			
Winterhoek	Winter Corner Mountains	Western Cape			Part of the Cape Fold Belt system
Witfonteinrand	White Fountain Ridge	North West			
Witteberge	White Mountains	Free State			
Witwatersberg	White Water Mountains	Gauteng			
Witwatersrand	White Waters Ridge	Gauteng	280		
Wolkberg	Cloud Mountains	Limpopo			Part of the Drakensberg system
Zuurberge	Sour, acid or acidic Mountains	Western Cape			Part of the Cape Fold Belt system

== See also ==
- Geography of South Africa
- List of mountains in South Africa
- Kaapvaal craton
