= Bamboesberg =

Mountain range in Eastern Cape, South Africa

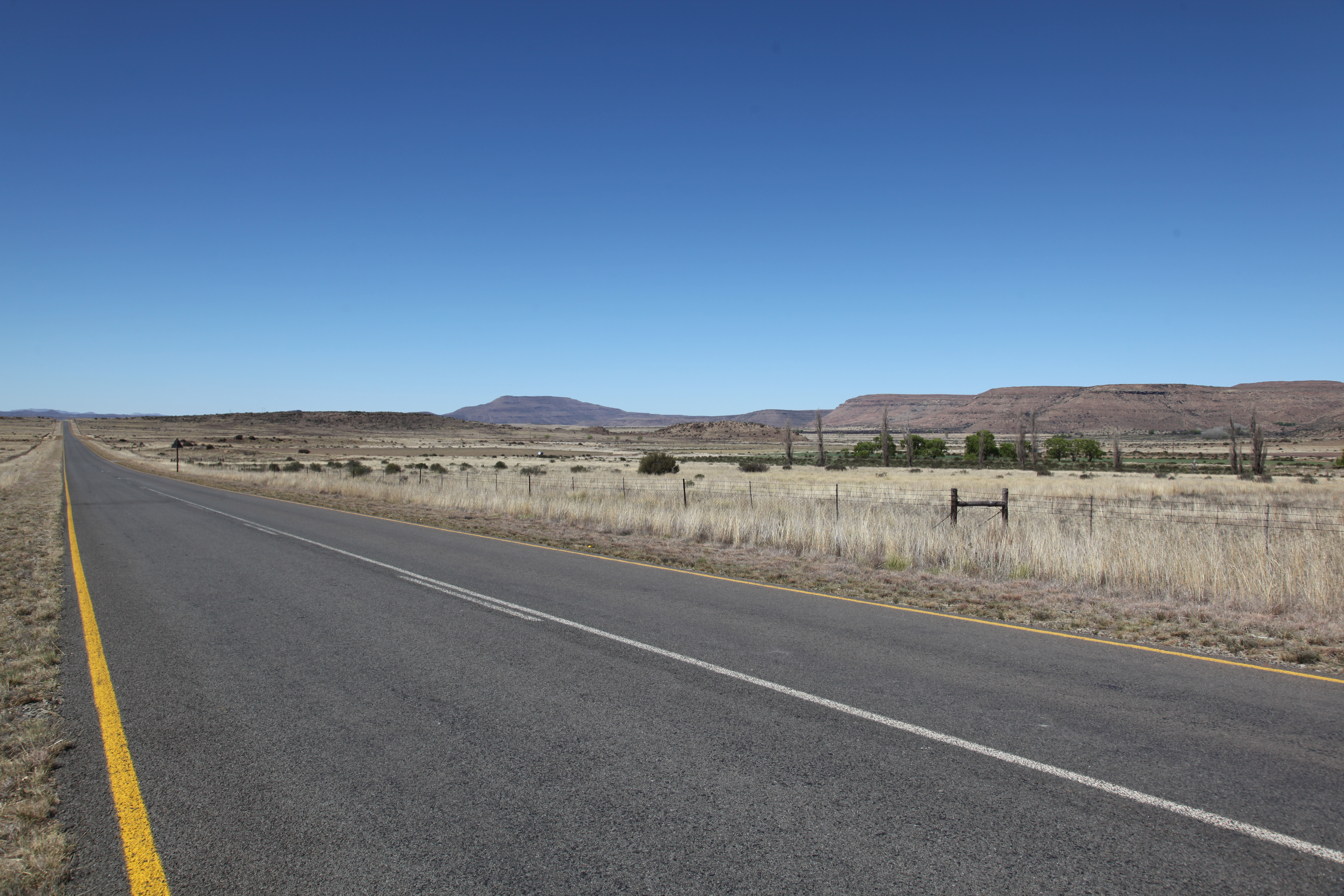
- The Bamboesberg from highway R56 between Steynsburg and Molteno

Highest point
- Peak: Aasvoëlberg
- Elevation: 2,208 m (7,244 ft)
- Coordinates: 31°36′24″S 26°07′12″E

Geography
- Location within South Africa
- Country: South Africa
- Province: Eastern Cape
- Parent range: Stormberg Mountains

Geology
- Orogeny: Kaapvaal craton
- Rock age: Neoarchean to early Paleoproterozoic
- Rock type(s): Bushveld igneous complex, sandstone

The Bamboesberg is a mountain range in the Eastern Cape, South Africa. This range was named for the bamboo Thamnocalamus tessellatus growing in its ravines.

The Bamboesberg is an outlier of the Stormberg Mountains and part of the range is seen parallel to and east of the road linking Hofmeyr and Tarkastad. Some of its peaks are over 6,000 feet (1,800 m) – Aasvoëlberg, 35 km west of Sterkstroom, rises to 7,245 feet (2,208 m). The Stormbergspruit is a tributary of the Orange River.

The rocks are composed of sediments of the Stormberg Series of the Karoo System.

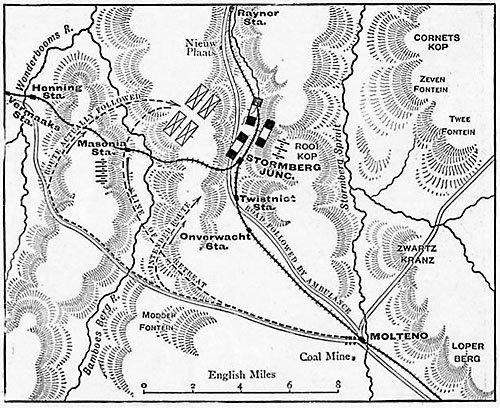
Positions at the Battle of Stormberg, 10 December 1899

== See also ==
- List of mountain ranges of South Africa
