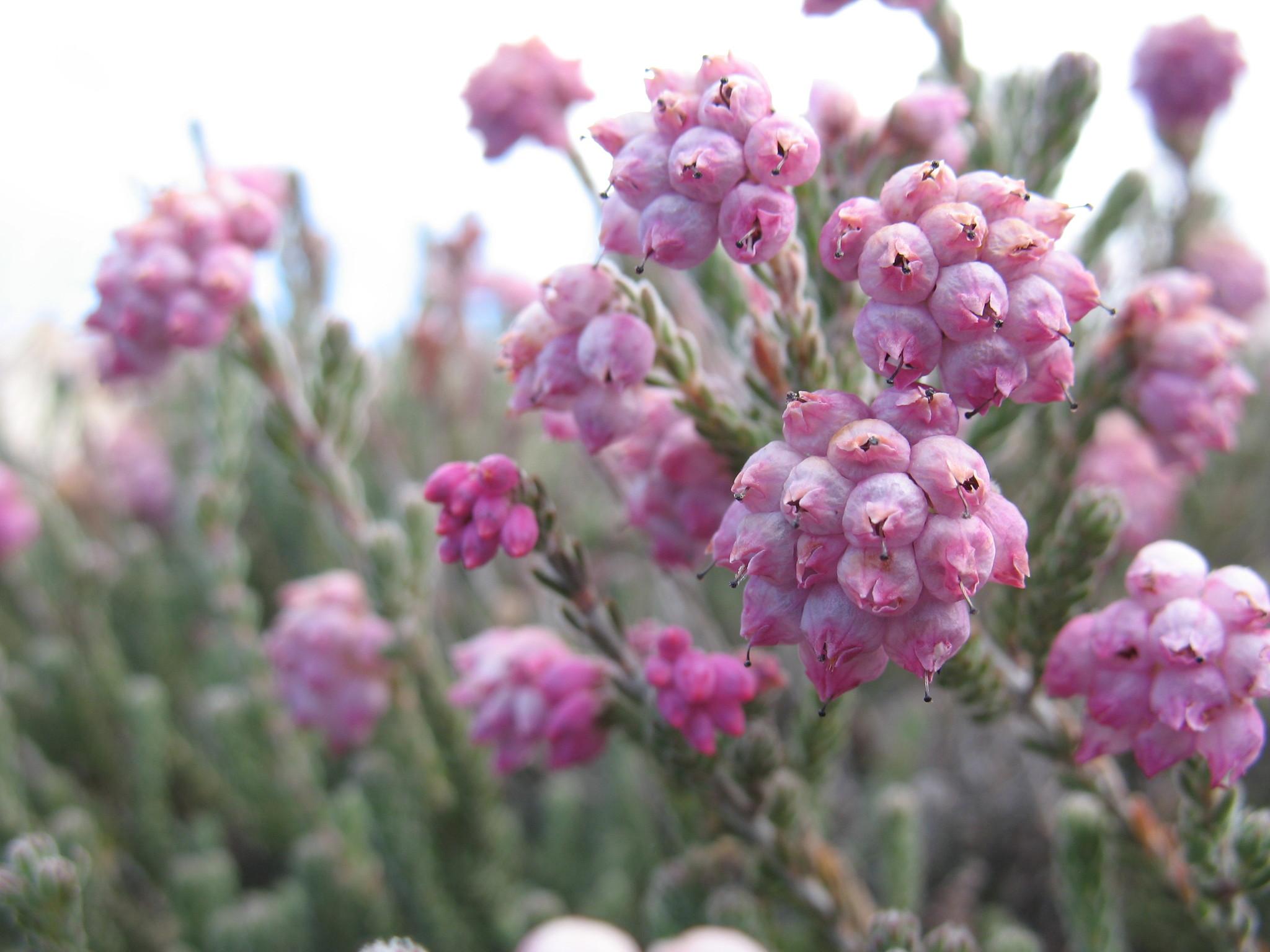

Scientific classification
- Kingdom: Plantae
- Clade: Tracheophytes
- Clade: Angiosperms
- Clade: Eudicots
- Clade: Asterids
- Order: Ericales
- Family: Ericaceae
- Genus: Erica
- Species: E. maderi

Binomial name
- Erica maderi Guthrie & Bolus

= Erica maderi =

Species of flowering plant

Erica maderi is a plant belonging to the genus Erica and is part of the fynbos. The species is endemic to the Western Cape and occurs from the Cederberg, through the Kouebokkeveld Mountains to the Hex River Mountains.
