= Stormberg Mountains =

Mountain range in South Africa

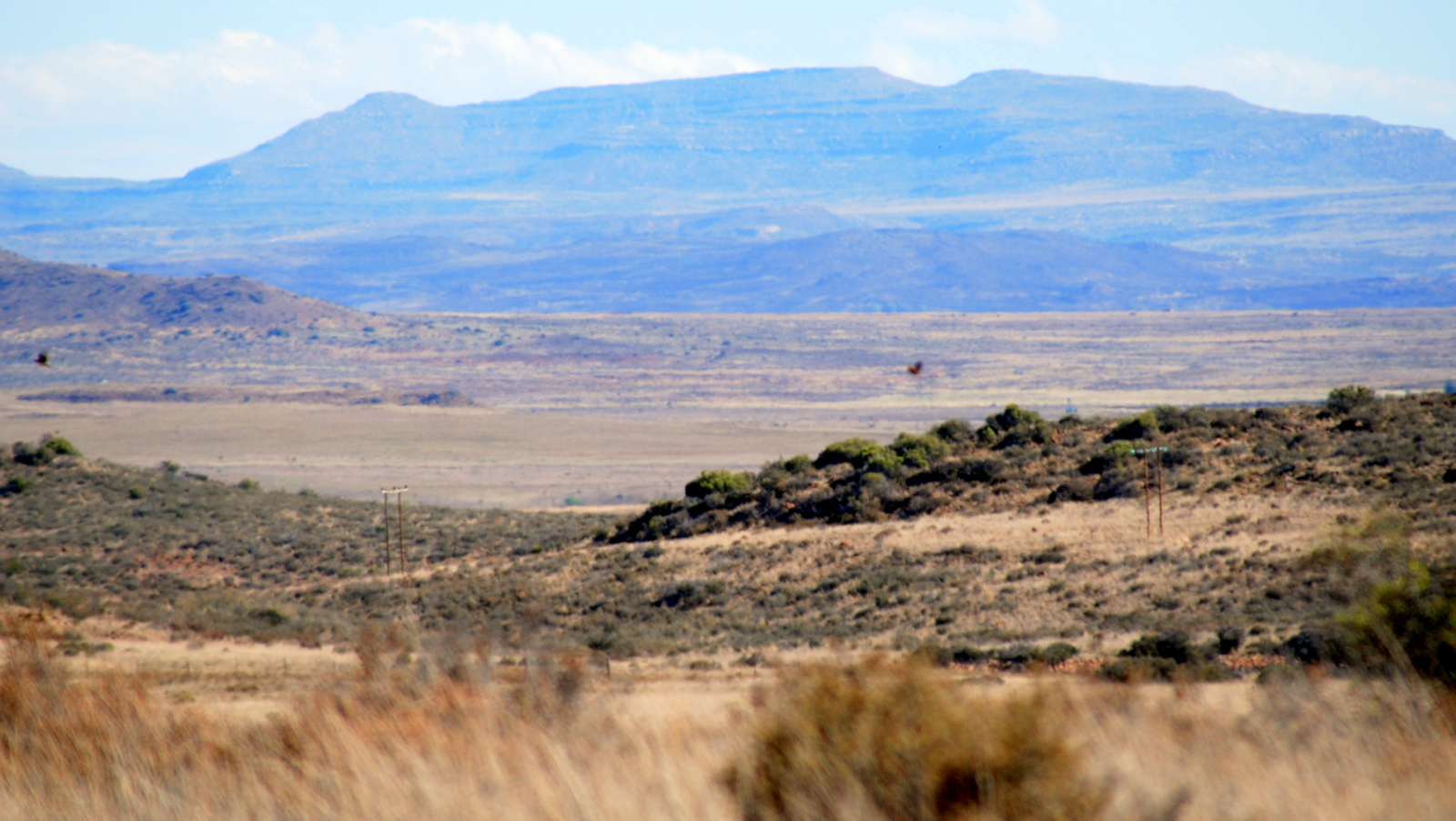
- View from the north

Highest point
- Coordinates: 31°26′51″S 26°43′3″E

Geography
- Location within South Africa
- Country: South Africa
- Province: Eastern Cape

Geology
- Orogeny: Kaapvaal craton
- Rock age: Neoarchean to early Paleoproterozoic
- Rock type(s): Bushveld igneous complex, sandstone

The Stormberg is a range of mountains situated in the Eastern Cape province of South Africa, are an easterly extension of the Bamboesberge and form an outlier of the greater Drakensberg mountain range. They form part of the 'Amatola and Stormberg' region which includes major towns like Grahamstown, East London and Port Alfred. Towns in the Stormberg Mountains include Sterkstroom, Jamestown, Molteno, Dordrecht, Barkly East, Rhodes and Steynsburg. South Africa's only ski resort, Tiffindell, is also situated in these mountains.

== Geology ==
Geologically, the mountains form part of the Stormberg Series of the Karoo System where some of the only workable coal seams in the Cape are to be found. These coal fields are being explored for possible coal bed methane extraction.

== History ==
These mountains - like all of South Africa - was originally home to the Khoisan hunter gatherers. The Nguni migrations saw the arrival of the Xhosa herders from the north and the displacement of the Khoisan. The subsequent arrival of the Cape colonists in the area resulted in a series of 'frontier wars' which led to the region's incorporation into the Cape Colony.

During the Second Boer War, this was the site of the Battle of Stormberg, fought on 9 December 1899.

== Gallery ==
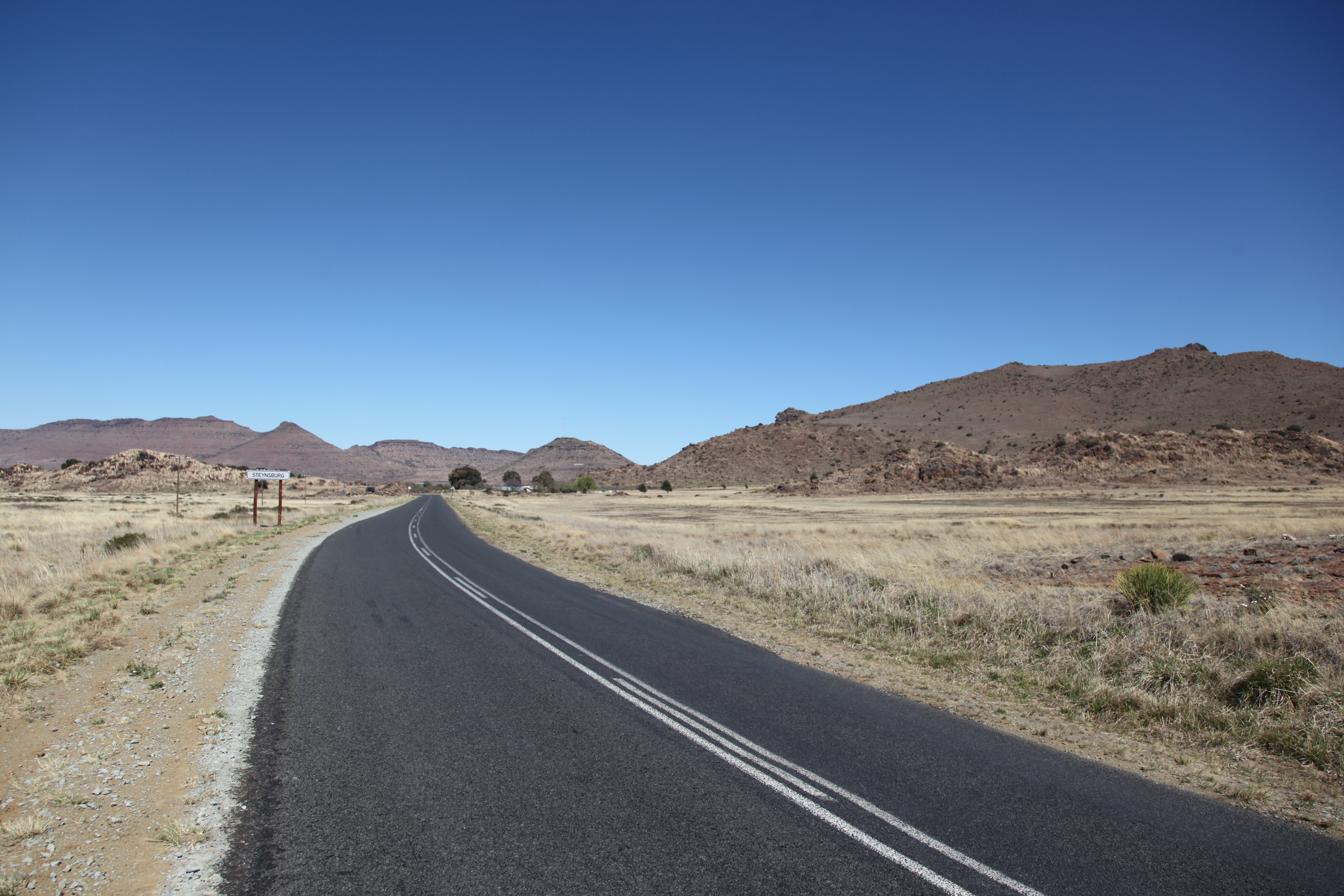
Highway R390 between Venterstad and Steynsburg

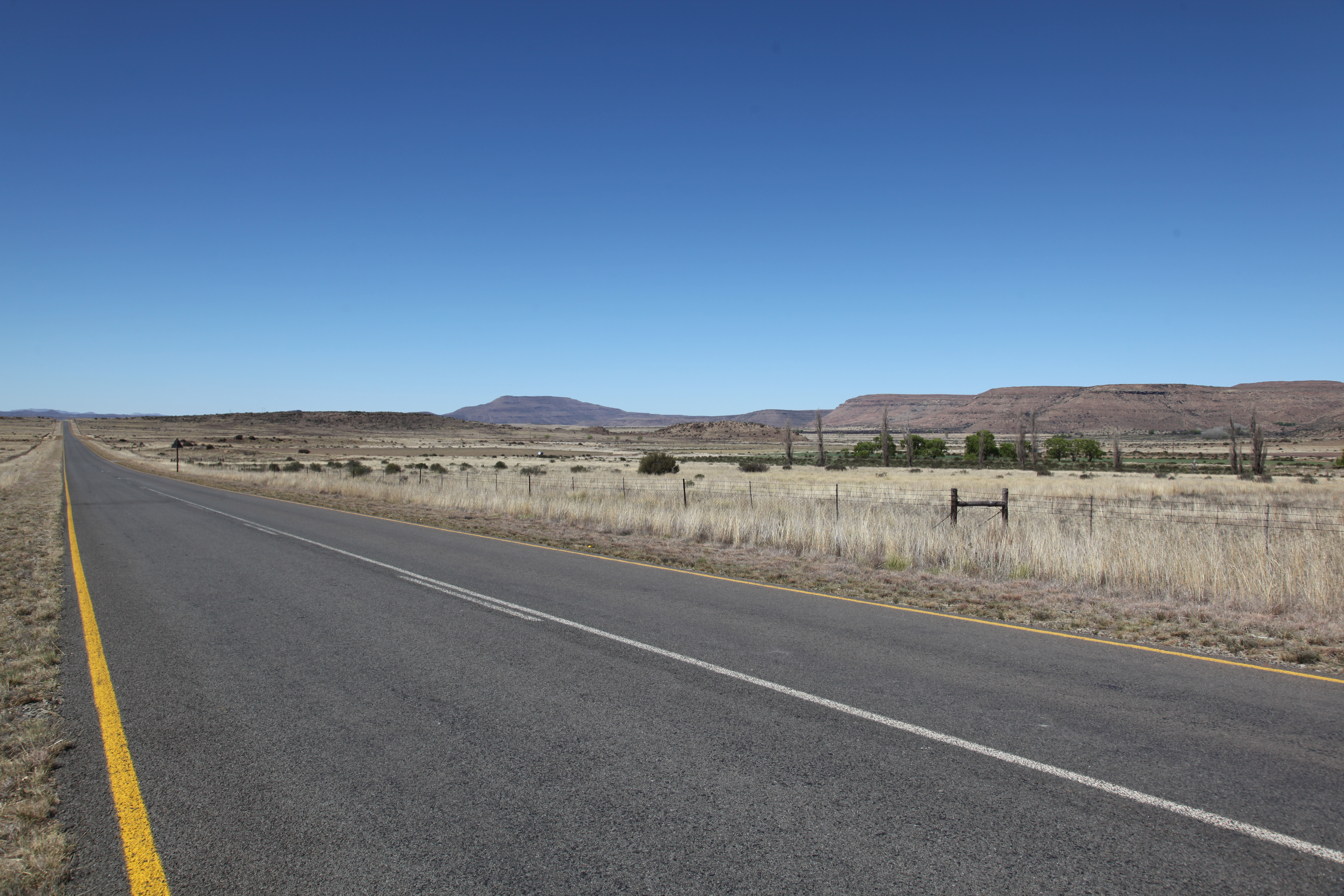
Highway R56 between Steynsburg and Molteno

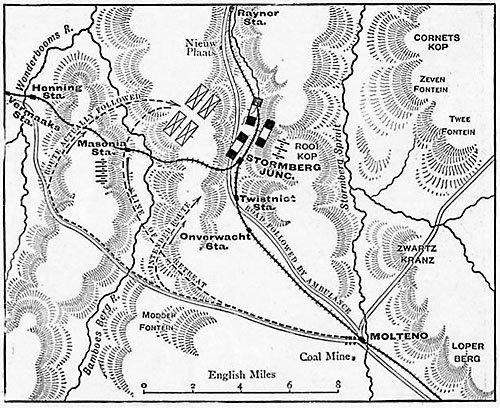
Positions at the Battle of Stormberg, 1899

== See also ==
- List of mountain ranges of South Africa
- Molteno Formation
- Molteno, Eastern Cape
