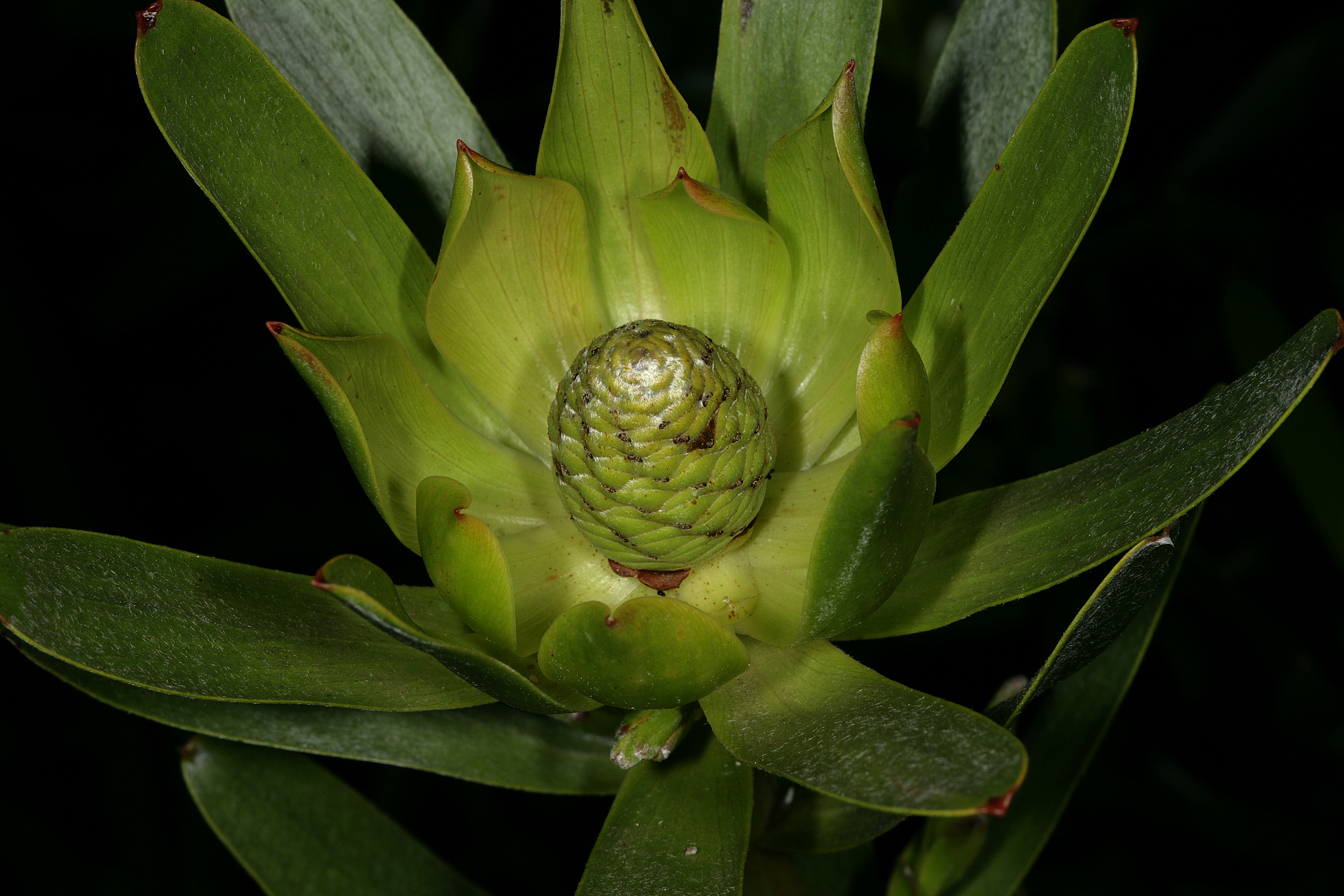

Conservation status
- Critically Endangered (IUCN 3.1)

Scientific classification
- Kingdom: Plantae
- Clade: Tracheophytes
- Clade: Angiosperms
- Clade: Eudicots
- Order: Proteales
- Family: Proteaceae
- Genus: Leucadendron
- Species: L. chamelaea

Binomial name
- Leucadendron chamelaea (Lam.) I.Williams

= Leucadendron chamelaea =

Species of plant

Leucadendron chamelaea, the Witsenberg conebush, is a flower-bearing shrub that belongs to the genus Leucadendron and forms part of the fynbos. The plant is native to the Western Cape, South Africa.

== Description ==
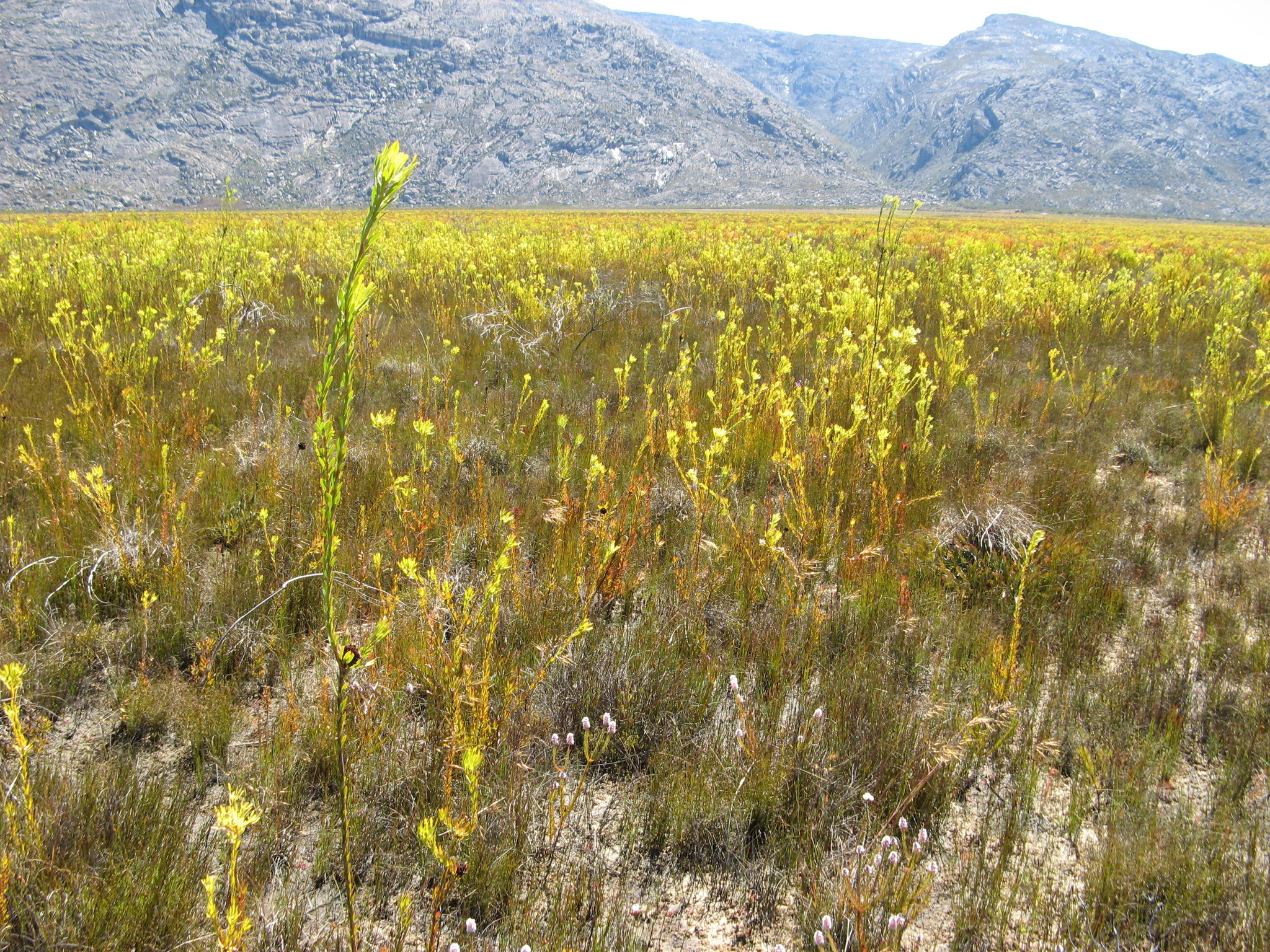

The shrub grows 2.3 m (7.5 ft) tall and bears flowers in September. Two months after the plant has flowered, the fruit appears and the seeds later fall to the ground.

Fire destroys the plant but the seeds survive. The plant is unisexual, there are male and female plants. Insects do the pollination and agriculture threatens the survival of the plant.

In Afrikaans, it is known as the witsenbergtolbos.

== Distribution and habitat ==
The plant occurs from the Kouebokkeveld Mountains to the Franschhoek Valley. It grows in sandstone sand at heights of 100–1,000 m (330–3,280 ft).

== Gallery ==
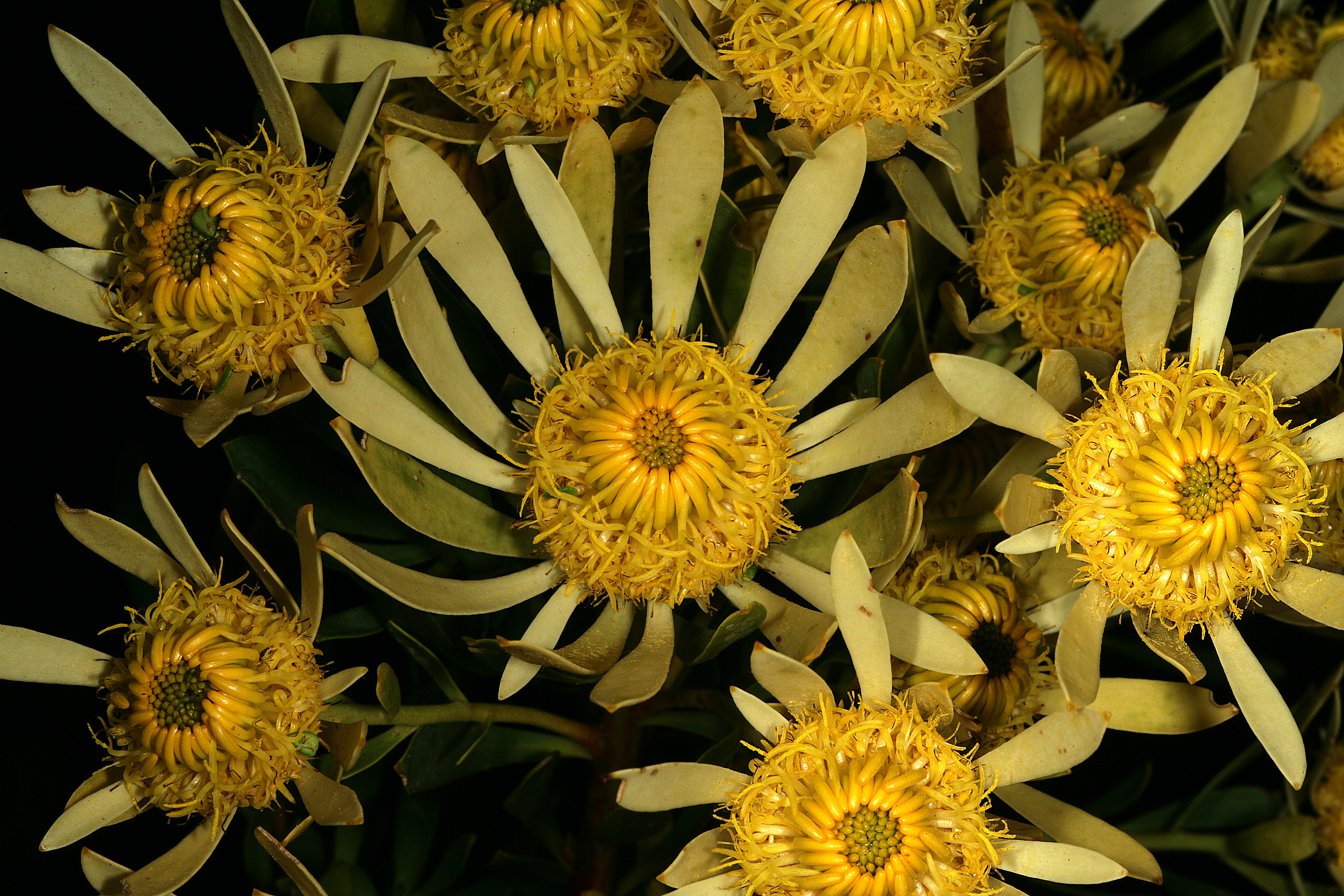

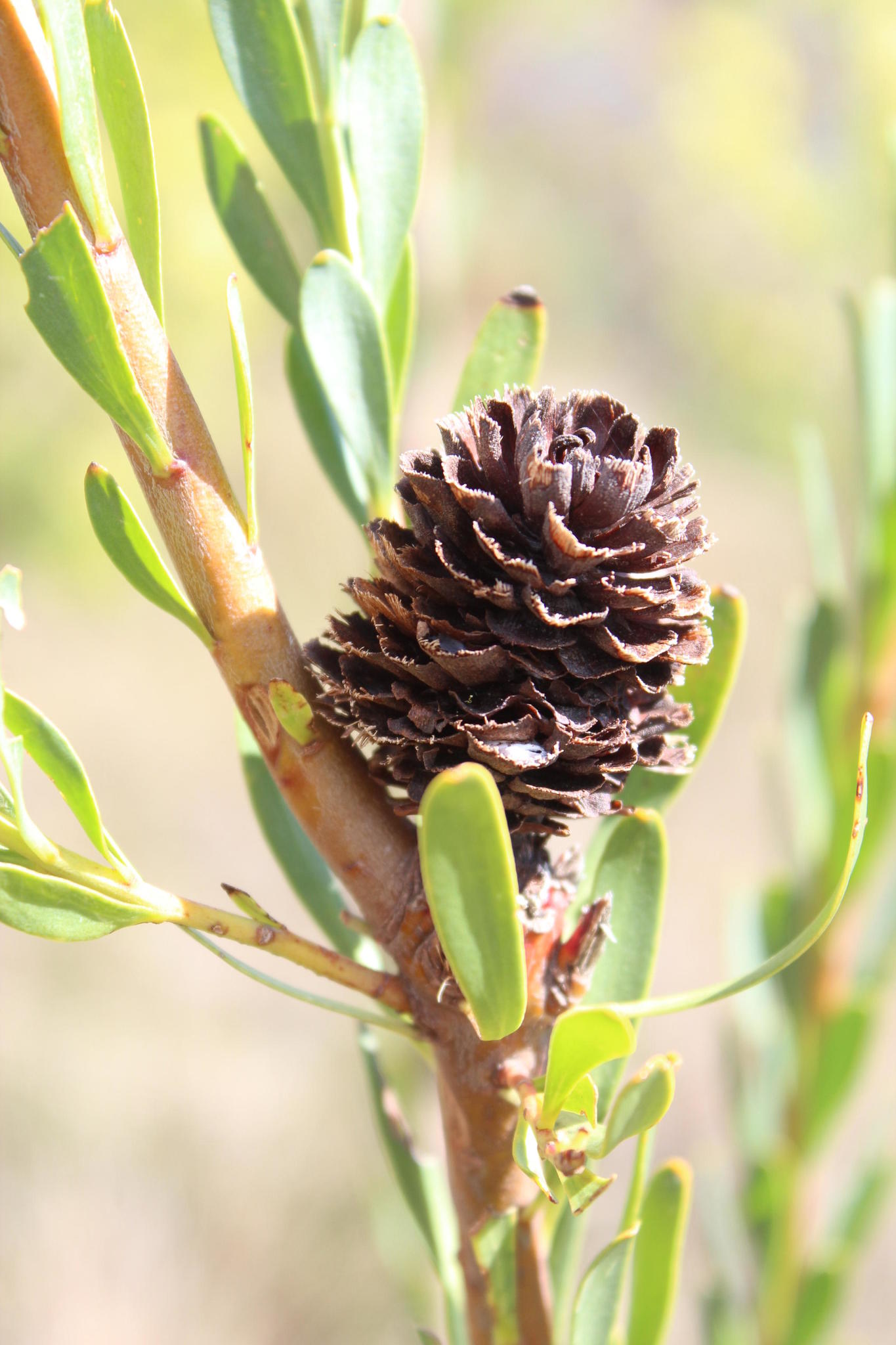

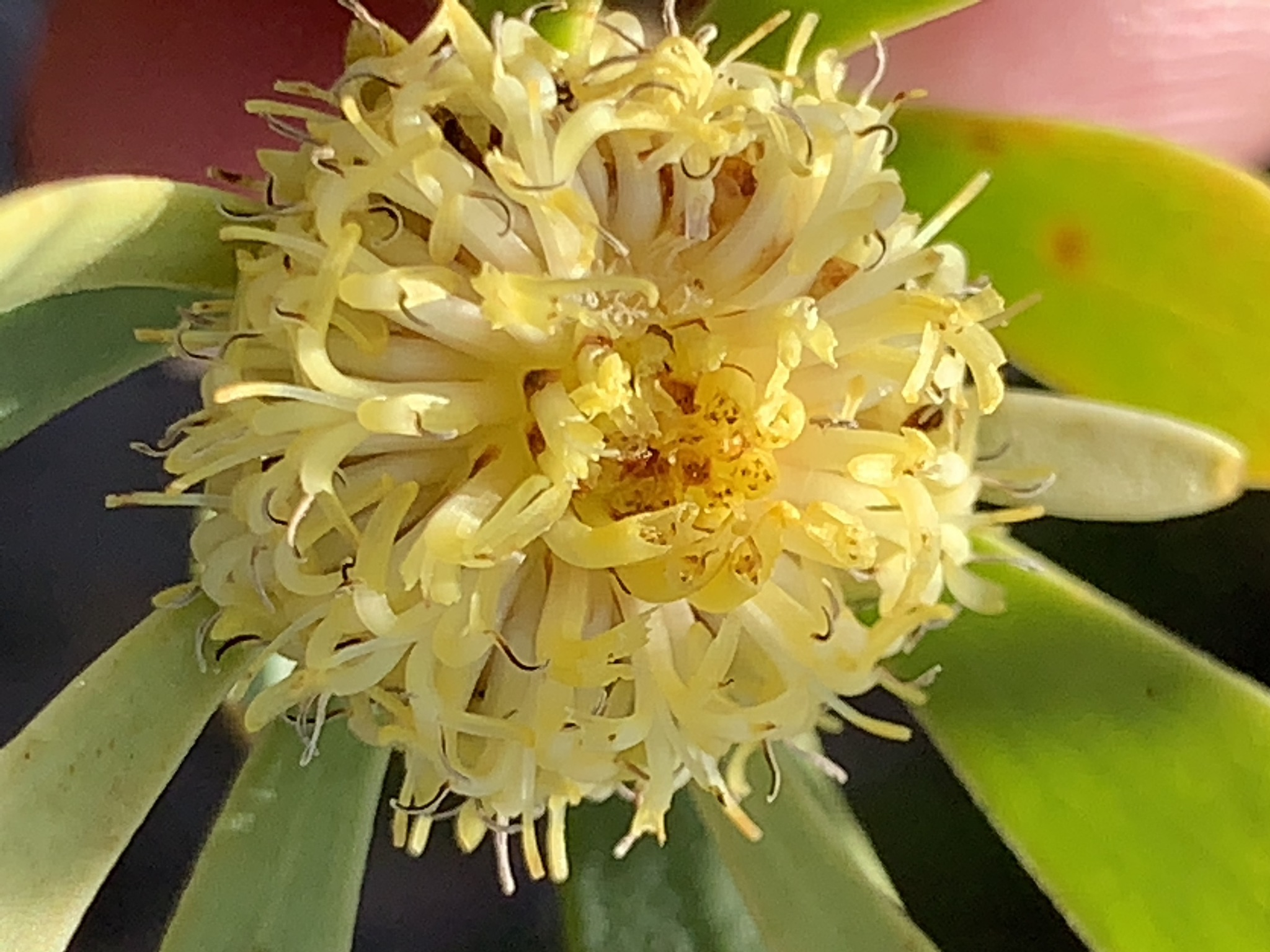

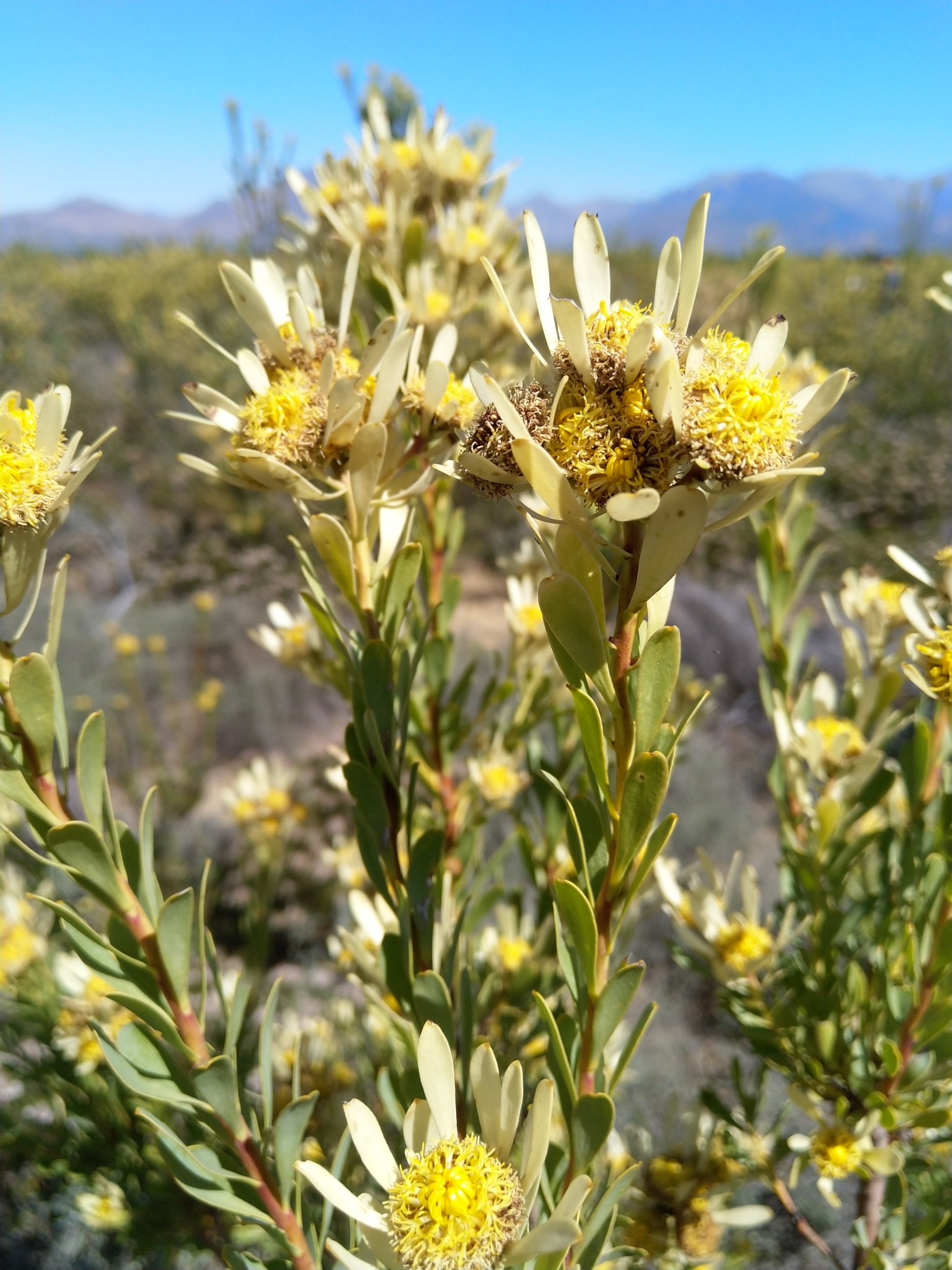
