= Erica marlothii =

Scientific classification
- Kingdom: Plantae
- Clade: Tracheophytes
- Clade: Angiosperms
- Clade: Eudicots
- Clade: Asterids
- Order: Ericales
- Family: Ericaceae
- Genus: Erica
- Species: E. marlothii

Binomial name
- Erica marlothii Bolus

Species of flowering plant

Erica marlothii is a plant belonging to the genus Erica and is part of the fynbos. The species is endemic to the Western Cape and occurs in the Cederberg, Koue Bokkeveld and Hex River Mountains. There are five subpopulations and the habitat is secure.
