= Disa introrsa =

Scientific classification
- Kingdom: Plantae
- Clade: Tracheophytes
- Clade: Angiosperms
- Clade: Monocots
- Order: Asparagales
- Family: Orchidaceae
- Subfamily: Orchidoideae
- Genus: Disa
- Species: D. introrsa

Binomial name
- Disa introrsa Kurzweil, Liltved & H.P.Linder

Species of flowering plant

Disa introrsa is a perennial plant and geophyte belonging to the genus Disa and is part of the fynbos. The plant is endemic to the Western Cape. The plant occurs on the southern slope of the Skurweberge in the Koue Bokkeveld, at altitudes of 1 000 - 1 190 m. The plant has an area of occurrence of only 10 km2 and there are two sub-populations, 5 km apart. One consists of less than 10 plants, the other 20 to 30. The plant flowers only after a fire and is possibly one of the reasons why it is so rarely seen. Both are threatened by crop cultivation and dam construction.
