= Molteno, South Africa =

Molteno eMolteno (Xhosa)
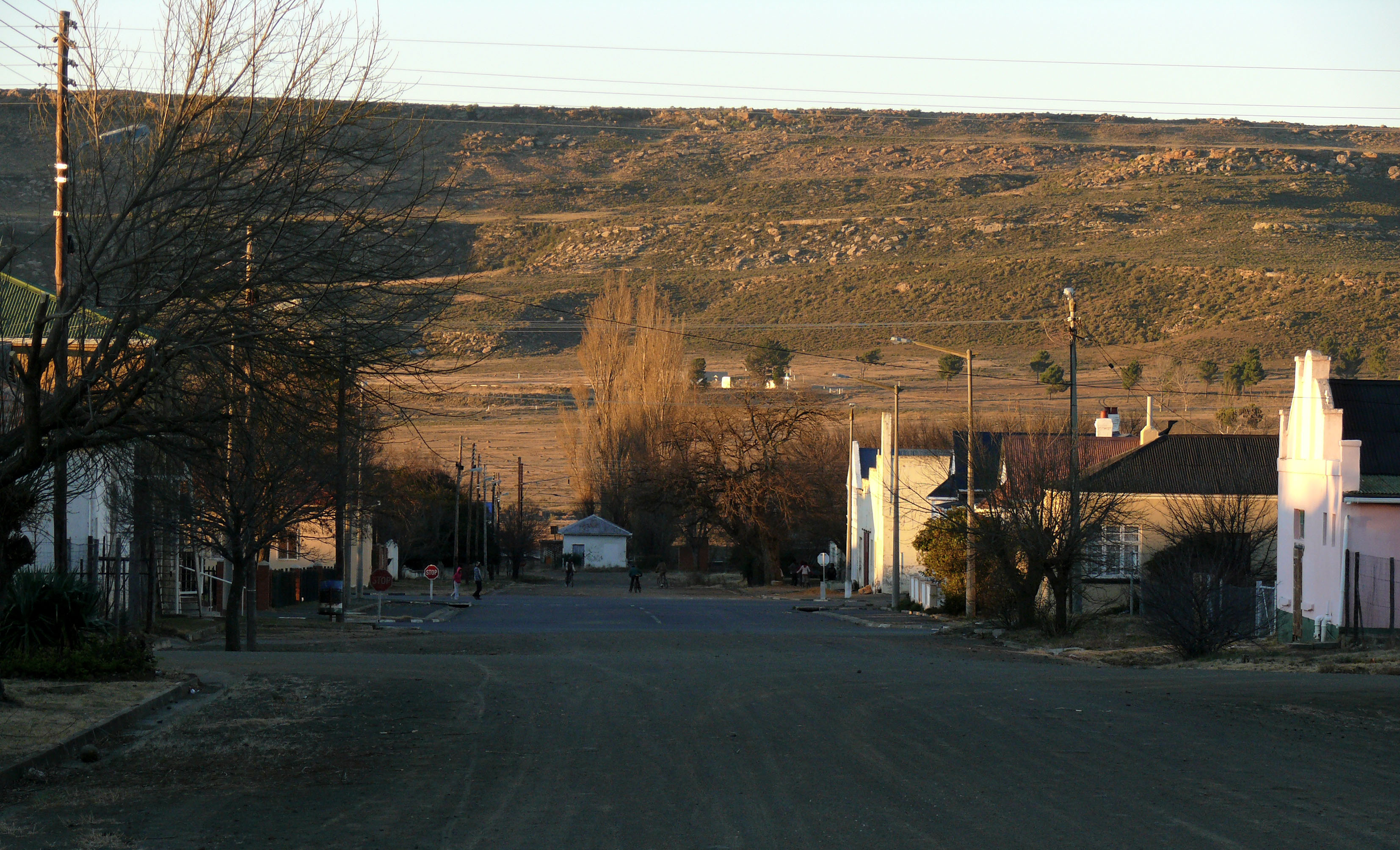

- Location within Eastern Cape Location within South Africa Location within Africa
- Coordinates: 31°23′46″S 26°21′47″E
- Country: South Africa
- Province: Eastern Cape
- District: Chris Hani
- Municipality: Enoch Mgijima

Area
  - Total: 11.50 km^{2} (4.44 sq mi)
- Elevation: 1,590 m (5,220 ft)

Population (2011)
  - Total: 11,553
  - Density: 1,005/km^{2} (2,602/sq mi)

Racial makeup (2011)
  - Black African: 92.1%
  - Coloured: 4.7%
  - Indian/Asian: 0.1%
  - White: 2.7%
  - Other: 0.5%

First languages (2011)
  - Xhosa: 89.3%
  - Afrikaans: 6.5%
  - English: 2.3%
  - Other: 2.0%
- Time zone: UTC+2 (SAST)
- Postal code (street): 5500
- PO box: 5500
- Area code: 045

Molteno (/mɒlˈtiːnoʊ/ mol-TEE-noh; Xhosa: eMolteno [emolˈtɛːno]) is a town in the Eastern Cape province of South Africa.

High in the Stormberg Mountains, Molteno has recorded South Africa's coldest temperatures at the famous Buffelsfontein weather station and it is close to the country's only ski resort. Sutherland has the country's coldest average temperature throughout the year, whereas Molteno records the lowest temperatures in the winter months.

== History ==
=== Founding ===
Coal fields were discovered in this part of the Stormberg Mountains in 1859, and this created an economic incentive for development. The local people also stated a need for a settlement, to serve as a central hub for the surrounding rural area. The town was founded in 1874 by George Vice, and laid out the next year. The town was the setting of South Africa's first coal mine. Its name has connections both locally to the people of the Eastern Cape (Molteno is a name among the Xhosa speaking people of the district), but it also has Italian roots. At its founding, the town was officially named after an immigrant John Molteno, who had been born in London into a large Anglo-Italian family. Molteno became the first locally elected leader of the Cape and fought against British imperial expansion in southern Africa. Several of the town's streets are similarly named after the members of the Cape's first locally elected cabinet. Water was first drawn from the nearby Stormberg river, and later also from the Jubilee Dam.

=== Coal mining ===
Soon after its founding, the town became the major supplier of coal to the region, with a large portion going to supply the diamond fields in Kimberley. It was granted municipal status in 1883, and by 1892 around 6000 tons of coal were being extracted at Molteno. Much of this coal went to supplying the Cape's rapidly growing railway system. In 1887, the newly founded Molteno Chamber of Commerce was influential in urging the Cape Government to extend its railway system northwards into the Boer republics, so as to open up new markets. By 1897, production of coal in the region had risen to over 70,000 tons. However, by the 1920s the expansion of the railways made access to coal fields in Natal and the Transvaal possible, resulting in the decline of coal mining around Molteno.

=== Boer War ===
During the Second Boer War, Molteno was used as a mustering point for troops prior to the famous Battle of Stormberg, as it was the closest railway station. The area also saw extensive Boer guerilla activity.

=== The Molteno struggle ===
In the 20th century, growing oppression by the Apartheid government was met by resistance that manifested in the town as protests and battles between Molteno residents and police. When the Group Areas Act was enforced across South Africa in the 1960s, the mixed neighbourhoods in Molteno were destroyed and the entire town was divided. Some mixed neighbourhoods such as Esigingqini had their residents evicted, others such as Nomonde were delimited by enforced segregation. As a result, the overall town suffered a severe economic and social decline.

Resistance came to a head on 12 August 1985, when local residents and students confronted the Apartheid police in the area around the town's Ethiopian Church. In the resulting battle, three local Molteno activists were shot and killed (R. Mbango, S. Loliwe, N. Smile). The town commemorates the activists and the 12 August date annually, as "Molteno Day".

The following years saw other community activists of the town lose their lives in the struggle. After the fall of Apartheid, the town erected a monument in what was named "Heroes Park" in the town centre. The monument honours the local Molteno "comrades in blood" who "... shall forever be remembered by the people of Molteno and South Africa as a whole".

Since liberation in 1993, the town has begun the task of reuniting its communities and reversing the damage it has sustained from decades of segregation and oppression. Within the greater District Municipality, it now lies on the North-South Corridor (Corridor 4), which links Molteno to Queenstown - the proposed location for a Special Economic Zone (SEZ).

== Places of interest ==
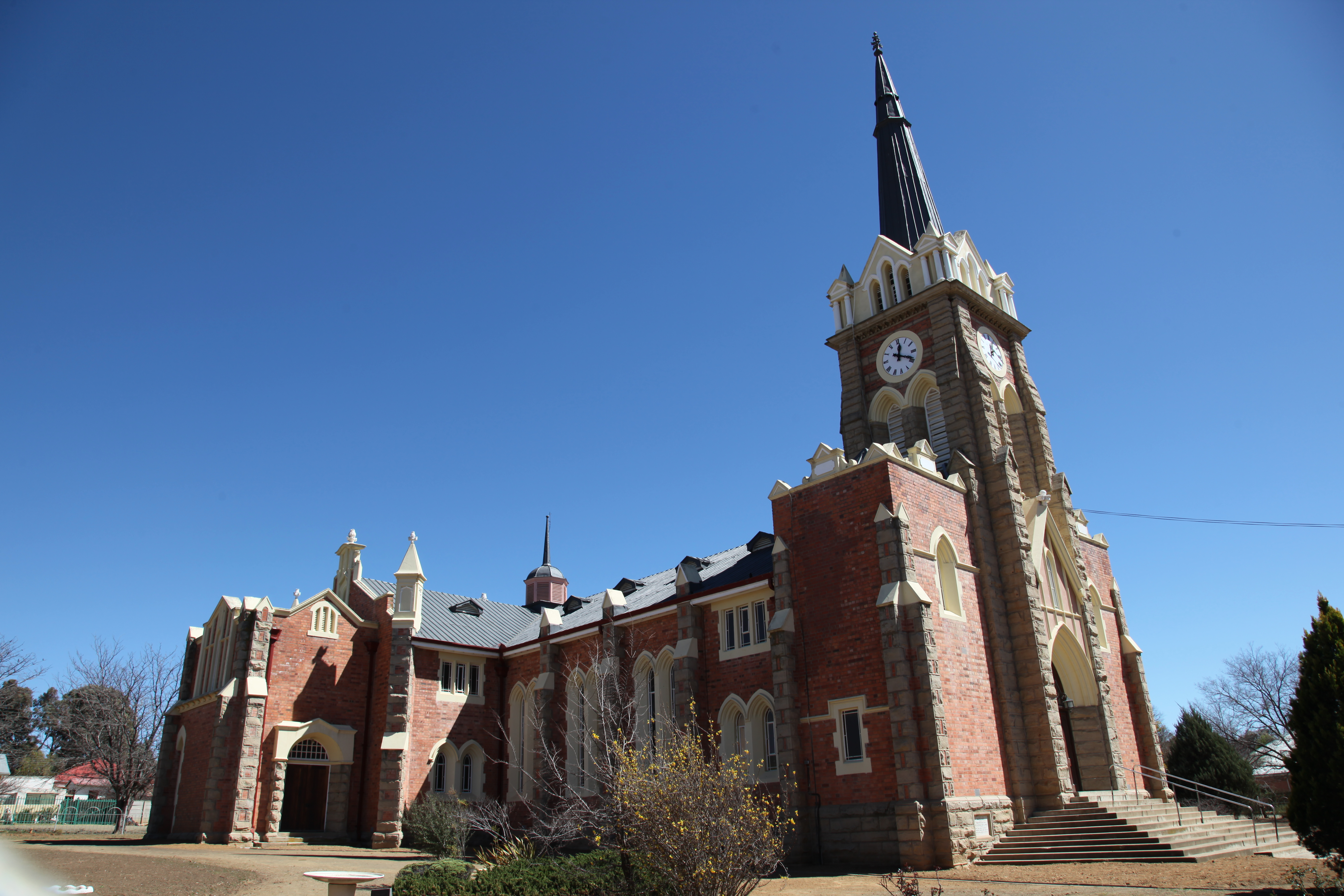
Molteno NG Church

Although hot and arid in summer, in winter Molteno is the coldest town in South Africa, being located near the highest point in the Cape in the heart of the Stormberg Mountains. Because of its extreme temperatures, it offers snow in the colder months and the town is not far from the country's only ski resort, Tiffindell. There are 4X4 trails in the mountains and the nearby Molteno Dam offers water-skiing and trout-fishing.

The town has several botanical gardens, a monument to local Molteno activists in the liberation struggle and a historic library built from local stone. The surrounding mountains are largely composed of sandstone of exceptional quality, and there were originally plans to build the whole town from this beautiful rock, as a "Sandstone City". Nonetheless, several of the oldest buildings in the town are still made from local stone, fashioned by Italian artisans. The Old Mill is one example, built in 1874 and restored in 1991, as is the local Church and "Drostdy" (Magistrate's office). Molteno is also home to the Stormberg biltong factory. The R47-million factory is the town's largest employer employing 250 residents.

The Molteno Museum is located in the stone library building and aims to portray the history of the town and its surrounds. It contains a range of artifacts, from Stone-Age tools to Khoisan, Xhosa and Voortrekker relics including a large collection of vintage guns. It also houses local war relics from the Boer War, and a display of pioneering historical photography from the region, the "Lomax Collection". Also of historical interest are the blockhouses that are located in the area, dating from the Boer War, and the Stormberg Battlefields.
There is a lot of Bushman rock art in the surrounding mountain ranges. The area around the town offers ample opportunity to view rock paintings, fossils and Stone Age tools uncovered in caves and diggings close to Molteno. There are also three extinct volcanoes in the vicinity.

The town has one of the oldest railway stations in South Africa - now officially reopened after being closed for repairs. The station lies on the main line from East London, inland to Johannesburg. This line was actually planned and begun by the same John Molteno after whom the town is named, but the railway only reached the town in 1884 and the section further north to Aliwal North was opened on 2 September 1885.

Molteno and its surrounding region in the heart of the Eastern Cape played a significant role in the struggle against Apartheid. Because of this, the town boasts several monuments to local activists who fought or gave their lives in the struggle, such as the Molteno Heroes Park monument in the town centre, and the Nomonde graves, among others. Molteno also forms part of the Calata Heritage Route for the liberation struggle.

== Geography ==
Molteno is surrounded by mountains and high Karoo plains, known for its vast panoramic views. It is also located almost exactly on the watershed between the catchment areas of the Atlantic Ocean (e.g. the Orange River to the north) and the Indian Ocean.

The semi-arid, succulent-rich vegetation of the Great Karoo ecoregion predominates in the area.

=== Climate ===
Molteno has a subtropical highland climate (Cwb, according to the Köppen climate classification), with warm summers and chilly, dry winters, with occasional snowfalls. It borders on a semi-arid climate (BSk). The average annual precipitation is 401 mm (16 in), with rainfall occurring mainly during summer.

Molteno is one of the coldest towns in South Africa; the farm of Buffelsfontein, located near Molteno, has the lowest recorded temperature in South Africa, of −20.1 °C (−4 °F), on 23 August 2013. The former national record, of −18.6 °C (−1 °F), was also registered in the same locality, on 28 June 1996. Likewise, with an average yearly temperature of 11.3 °C and an average annual minimum temperature of 2.8 °C, Buffelsfontein is the coldest reporting station in South Africa.

The (now defunct) administrative area to which Molteno belonged for a time, Inkwanca, literally means "cold" in Xhosa.

Molteno

Climate chart (precipitation, max. and min. temperature)
J	F	M	A	M	J	J	A	S	O	N	D
54 28 12	64 26 12	70 24 10	36 20 6	19 17 2	8 13 0	6 14 0	8 16 0	15 19 4	32 22 6	42 24 9	47 26 11
- █ Average max. and min. temperatures in °C
- █ Precipitation totals in mm
- Source: SA Explorer
Imperial conversion
J	F	M	A	M	J	J	A	S	O	N	D
2.1 82 54	2.5 79 54	2.8 75 50	1.4 68 43	0.7 63 36	0.3 55 32	0.2 57 32	0.3 61 32	0.6 66 39	1.3 72 43	1.7 75 48	1.9 79 52
- █ Average max. and min. temperatures in °F
- █ Precipitation totals in inches

=== Geology ===
Molteno is located on the Stormberg Series of the Karoo System where some of the only workable coal seams in the Cape are to be found (the Molteno Formation, the youngest in the Karoo System, is named after the town). These coal fields are being explored for possible coal bed methane extraction.

The rocks preserve a record of gradual desertification over millions of years, starting from the Upper Triassic when the area was a warm swampland, and continuing into the late Jurassic when the region had become a desert. Extensive Dinosaur footprints and fossils can be found in these rocks.

== Famous people ==
- Ambrose Lomax, chemist and photographer.
- Ferdie le Grange, South African athlete and surgeon.
- Francois Gouws, prominent South African artist.
- Johannes Meintjes, prominent South African artist.
- Kopi Ben Baartman, ANC regional chair and SACTU activist.
- LJ van Zyl, Springbok Athlete.

== Trivia ==
The butterfly genus Moltena and the Molteno Formation are both named after the town.

== See also ==
- Eastern Cape
- Battle of Stormberg
- Stormberg Mountains
- Molteno Formation
