= Prentjiesberg =

Mountain in Eastern Cape, South Africa

- Location within South Africa

Highest point
- Coordinates: 31°09′S 28°11′E

Geography
- Location: Kwa-Zulu Natal, South Africa

Prentjiesberg is an outlier mountain of the Drakensberg in the Eastern Cape province of South Africa, at about 2000 m above sea level and some 10 km north-west of the town of Ugie, near the southern tip of the mountain kingdom of Lesotho. The mountain stands high above the surrounding countryside, has a small summit area, with steep slopes and a local relief of 300 m or more.

The name is said to have derived from the numerous San paintings in the region, prentjies being Afrikaans for "small pictures".

== Ecology ==
The mountain boasts impressive rock formations, sheer sandstone cliffs, patches of indigenous forest, mountain bamboo and rich stands of proteas, and is drained by numerous streams, waterfalls and rock pools, in which a new species of fairy shrimp was recently discovered. It is also the preserve of crowned and black eagles, lanner falcons, bearded vultures and the threatened Cape vulture. Dassies are common along rocky parts while various large mammals such as blesbuck, mountain reedbuck and Burchell’s zebra have been introduced to the area.

The mountain is encircled by a well-marked and moderately strenuous 50 km hiking trail taking 3 days to complete. The first day's hike leads for 17 km through woodland forest to Fontana hut. The second day is along a 16 km walk to a comfortable cave at Craigmore, while the final stretch ends at Ben Vorlich.

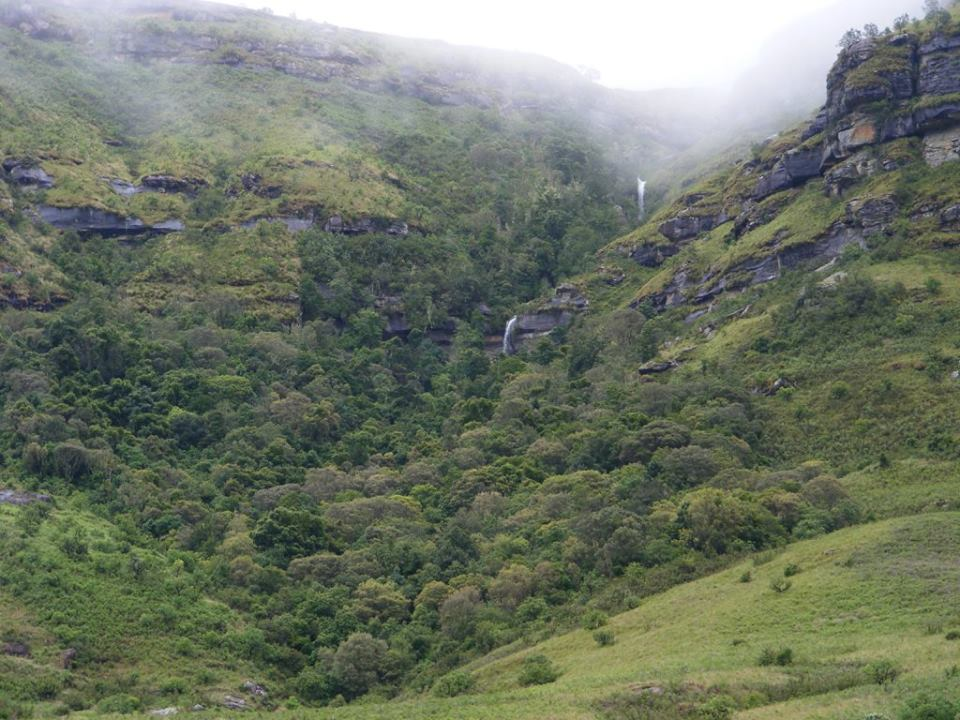

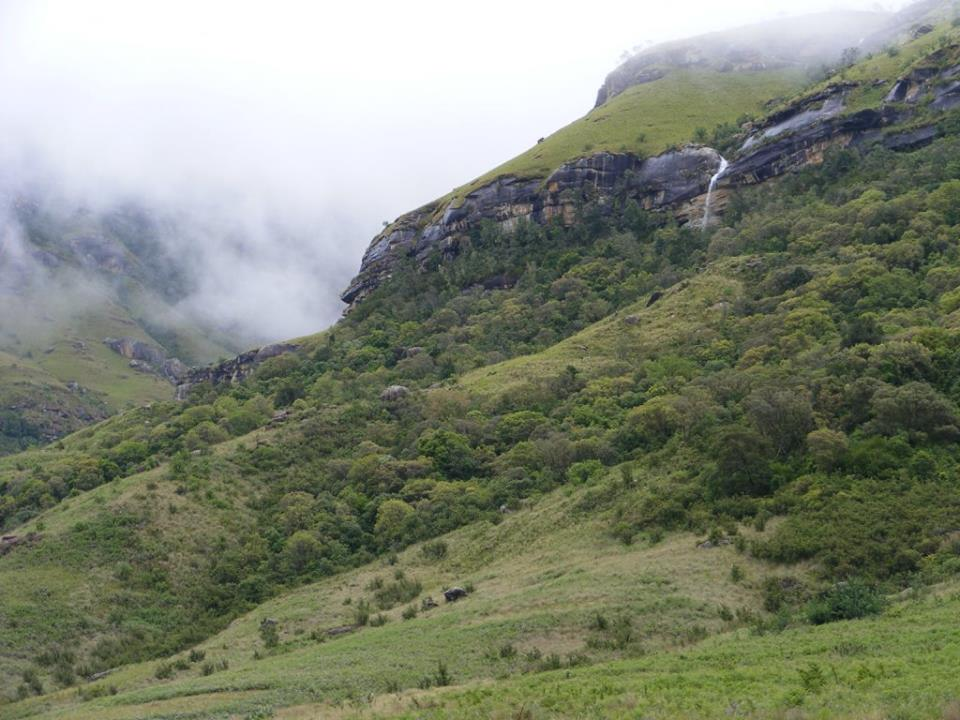

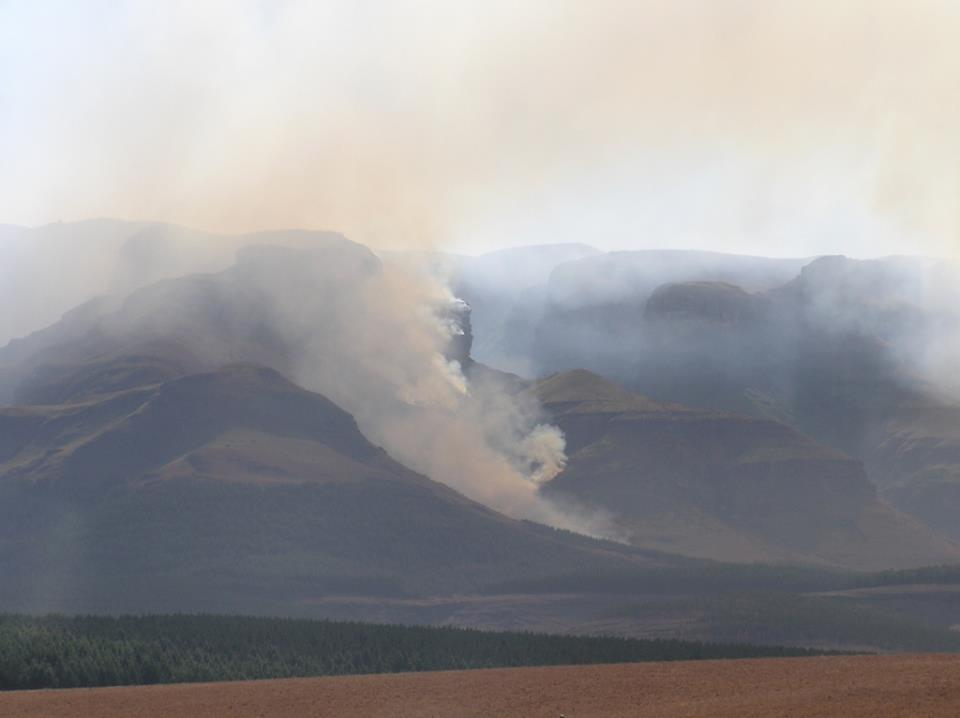
Disastrous uncontrolled 2005 burn

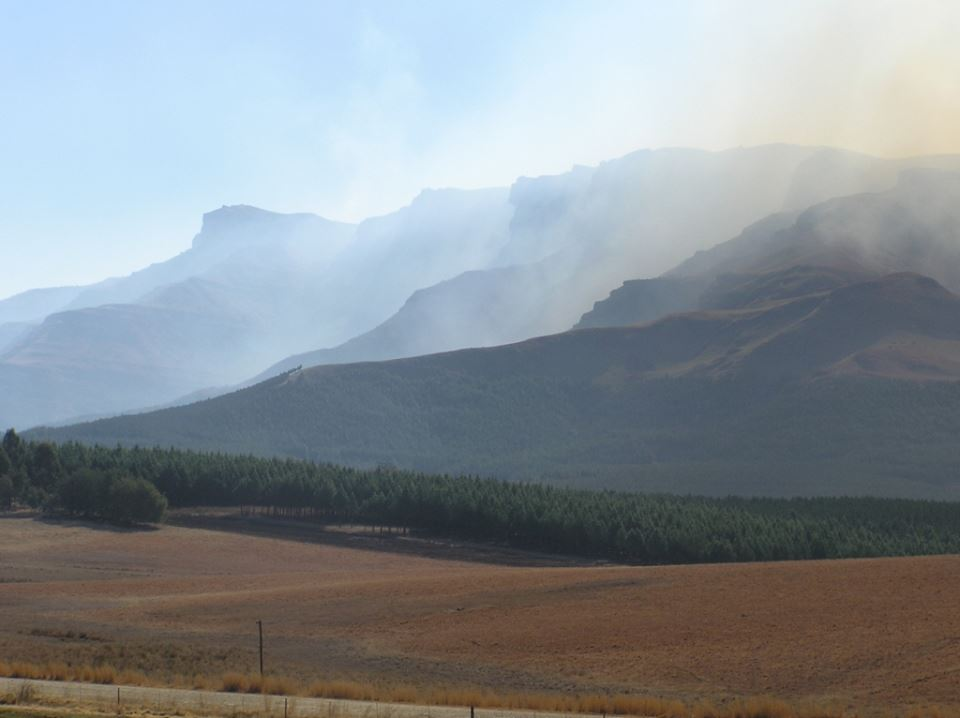
Disastrous uncontrolled 2005 burn

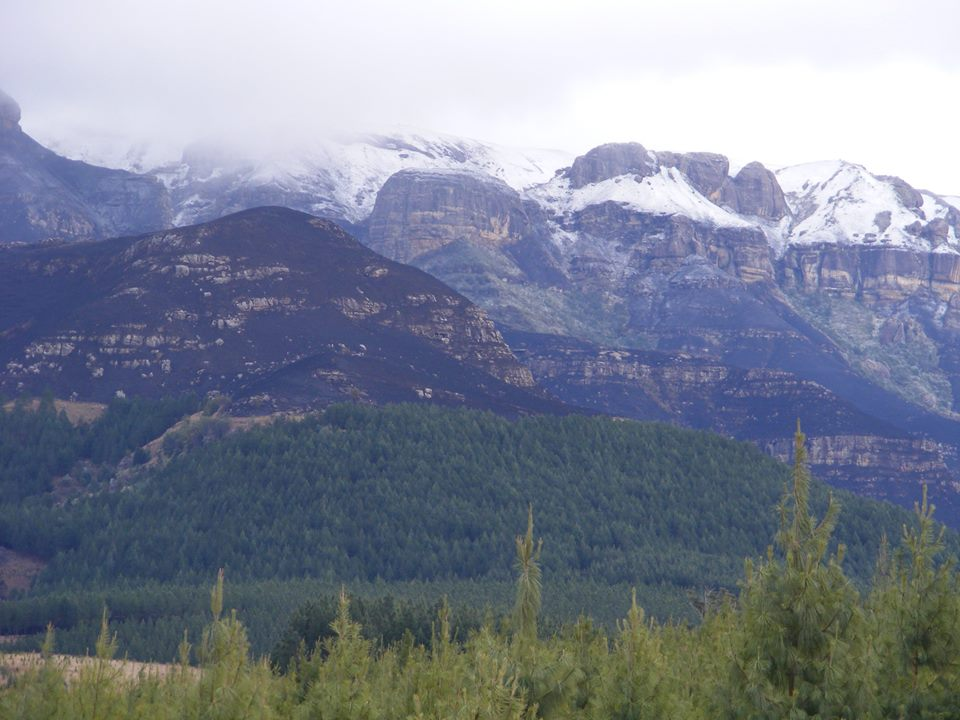
Snowfall shortly after 2005 burn
