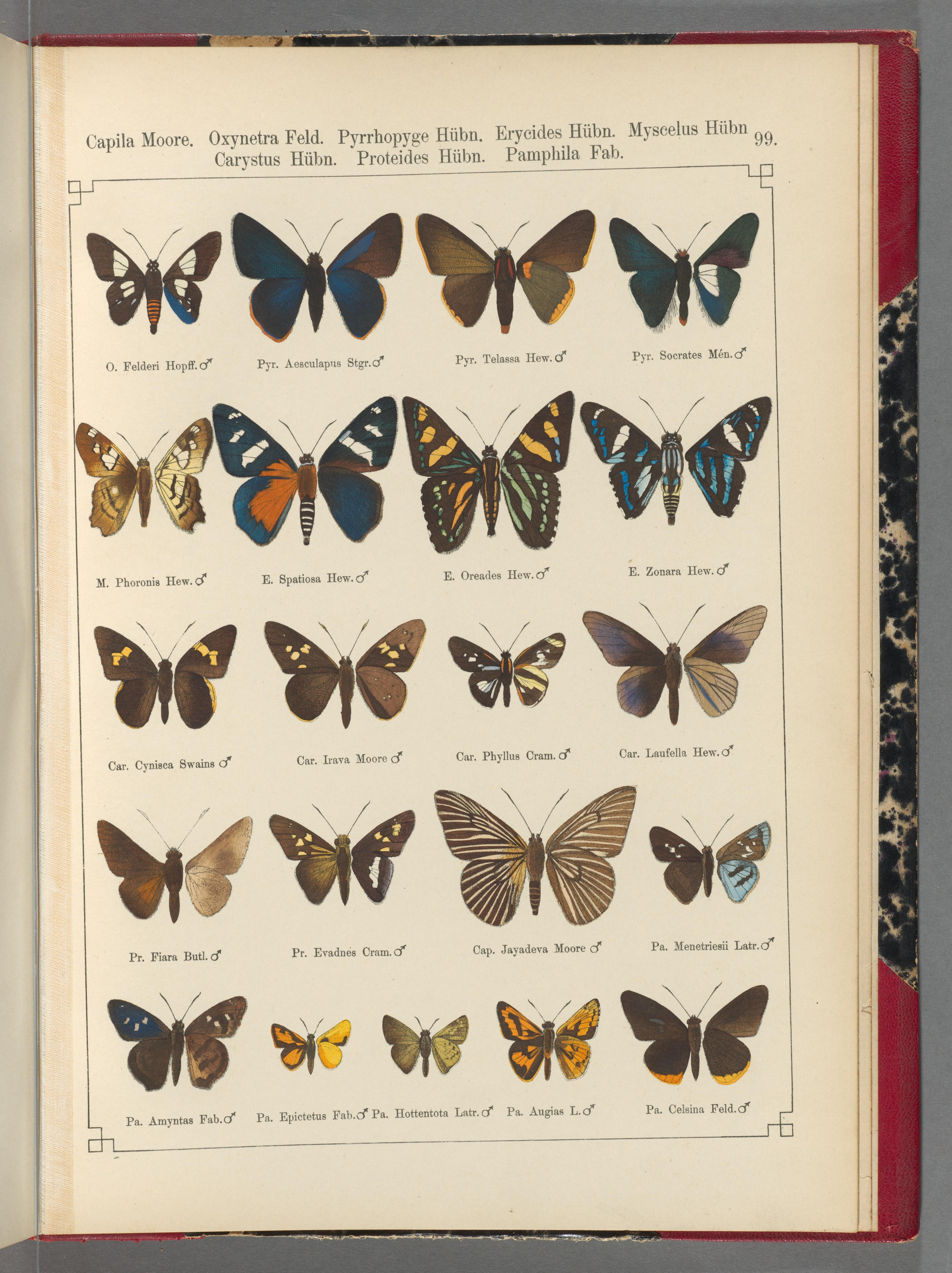
- Moltena fiara as Proteides fiara in Exotische schmetterlinge

Scientific classification
- Kingdom: Animalia
- Phylum: Arthropoda
- Class: Insecta
- Order: Lepidoptera
- Family: Hesperiidae
- Tribe: Erionotini
- Genus: Moltena; Evans, 1937

= Moltena =

Genus of butterflies

Moltena is a genus of skippers in the family Hesperiidae. It is named after the town of Molteno, Eastern Cape.

== Species ==
- Moltena fiara (Butler, 1870)
