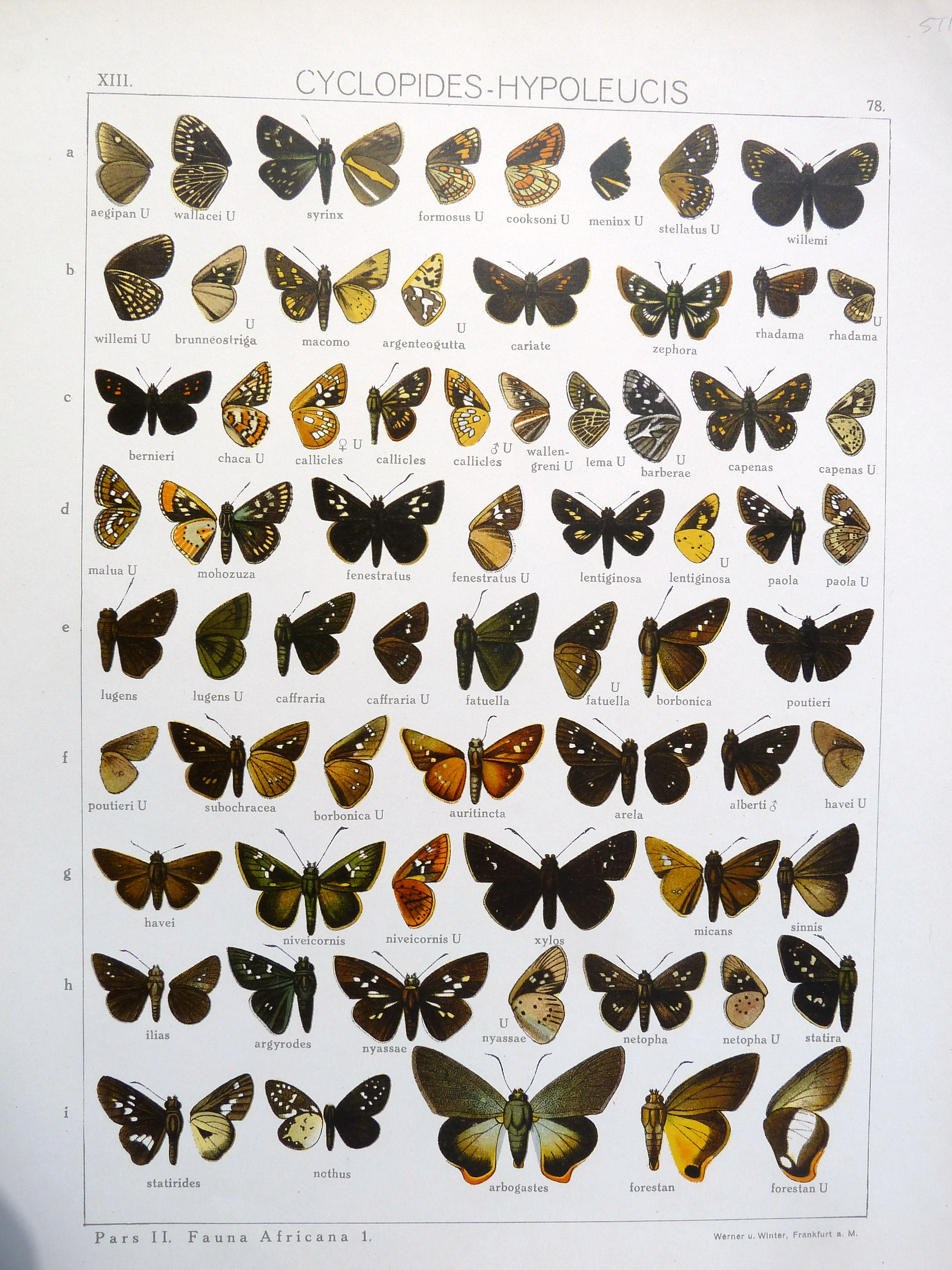
- a

Conservation status
- Vulnerable (IUCN 3.1)

Scientific classification
- Kingdom: Animalia
- Phylum: Arthropoda
- Class: Insecta
- Order: Lepidoptera
- Family: Hesperiidae
- Genus: Metisella
- Species: M. syrinx

Binomial name
- Metisella syrinx (Trimen, 1868)

Synonyms
- Cyclopides syrinx Trimen, 1868

= Metisella syrinx =

Bamboo sylph

Species of butterfly

Metisella syrinx, the bamboo sylph or bamboes-walsertjie, is a butterfly of the family Hesperiidae. It is a rare and highly localised species which is only known from South Africa in the eastern Cape, through southern Lesotho to the extreme south of KwaZulu-Natal. The habitat consists of rocky areas on the summits of mountains, in montane grassland.

== Distribution ==
M. syrinx is endemic to the Eastern Cape in South Africa, from Gaika's Kop (near Hogsback), and near Bedford.

== Description ==
The wingspan is 32–34 mm for males and 32–37 mm for females. Adults are on wing from January to February. There is one generation per year.

== Ecology ==
The larvae feed on the sole bamboo species in South Africa and Lesotho, Bergbambos.
