= Jan Hendrik Olivier =

Boer general

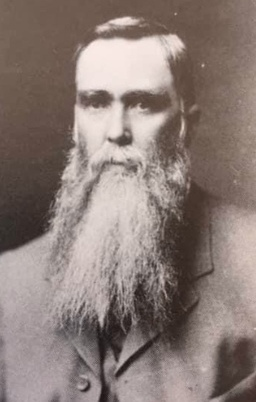
- Born: 24 January 1848; Burgersdorp, Cape Colony, British Empire
- Died: 30 May 1930 (aged 82); Volksrust, Transvaal, Union of South Africa
- Military career
- Allegiance: Orange Free State (1863 – 1900); South African Republic (1900)
- Branch: Orange Free State Army; Transvaal Army
- Service years: 1863 – 1900
- Rank: General
- Conflicts: Seqiti War; Second Boer War: Battle of Stormberg

Jan Hendrik Olivier (24 January 1848 - 30 May 1930) was a Boer general during the Second Boer War who was notable for being the main Boer commander at the Battle of Stormberg.

== Early life ==
His parents lived in the Burgersdorp area and later moved to Zastron. At the age of 15, he joined the Orange Free State border police. In 1865 he became a Field Cornet and fought in the Seqiti War. He was rewarded with the farm Olifantsbeen northwest of Zastron, which made him prosperous. He became a member of the Orange Free State Volksraad in 1883 for the Caledon River Division.

== Second Boer War ==
He was in command of the Rouxville and Thaba Nchu commandos, and moved with his mother through the Colesberg, Barkly East and Dordrecht areas. He was in command of the Boer forces during the Battle of Stormberg on 10 December 1899. Later he worked with General De Wet in the eastern Free State and Brandwater Basin. After an argument with De Wet, he decided to join the Transvaal Army. On the way there, he was captured by the British forces on 3 July 1900 and was exiled to Ceylon with three of his sons as prisoners of war.

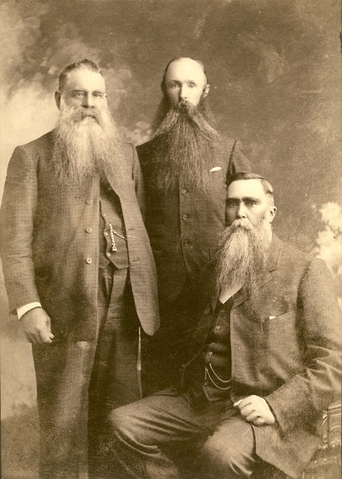
General Olivier is seated on the right.

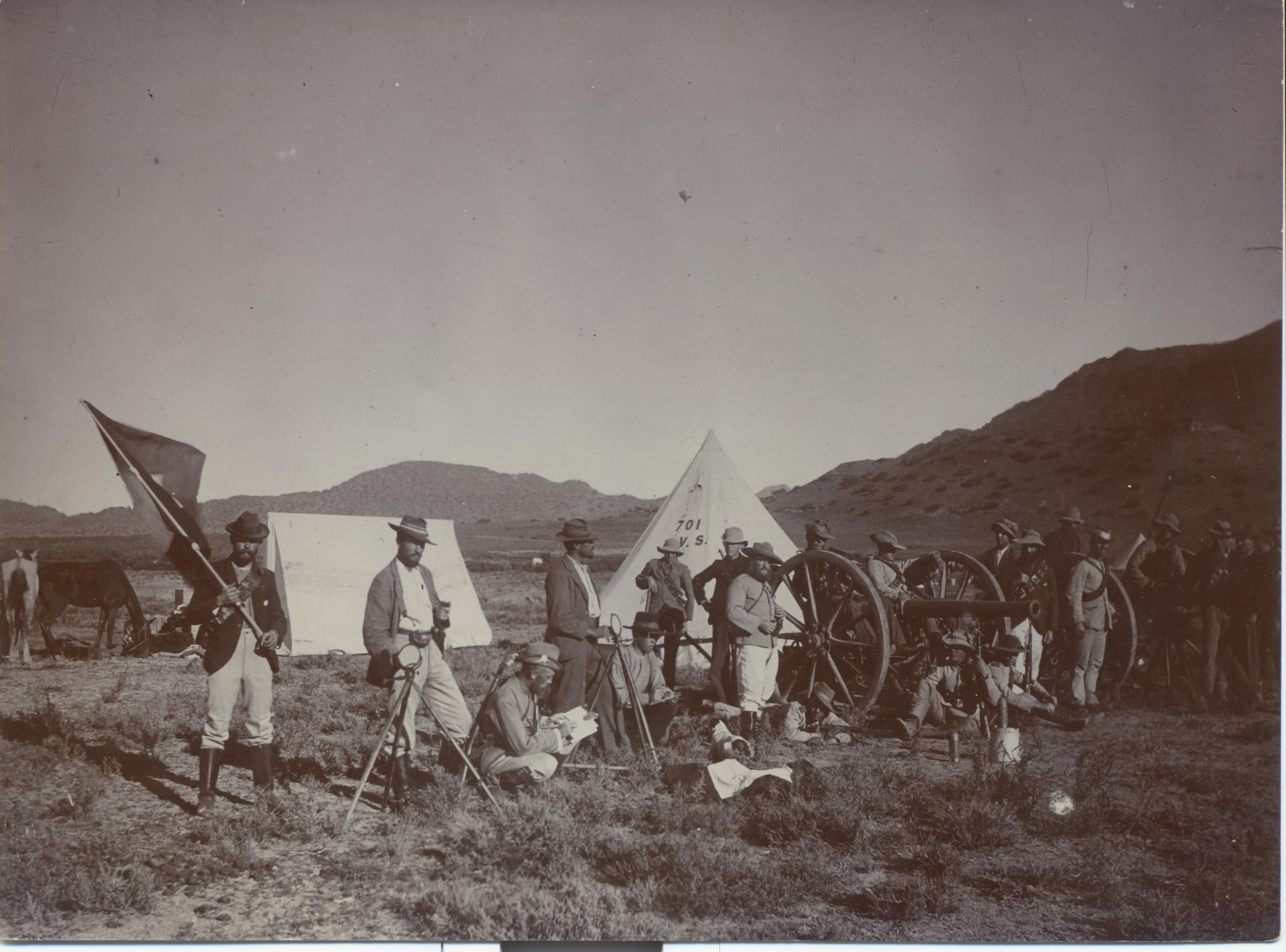
Olivier's Orange Free State artillery corps with heliographists near Colesberg, Second Boer War.

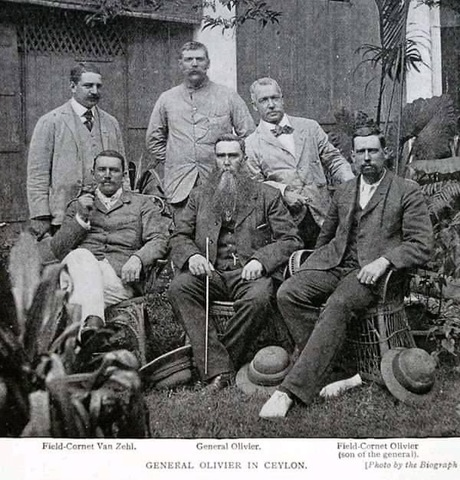
General Olivier (centre) with his son (right) and Van Zehl (left), both field cornets in Ceylon as prisoners of war, 1900–1902.

== Post-War Life ==
He was released from exile in 1902 and again became a member of the Legislative Assembly (Volksraad) for the Orange River Colony as well as a horse breeder before withdrawing from public life in 1910. He went to retire with his daughter at Rustenburg. He died during a visit to Volksrust and was buried there with military honours.
