= Ambrose Lomax =

South African photographer and chemist

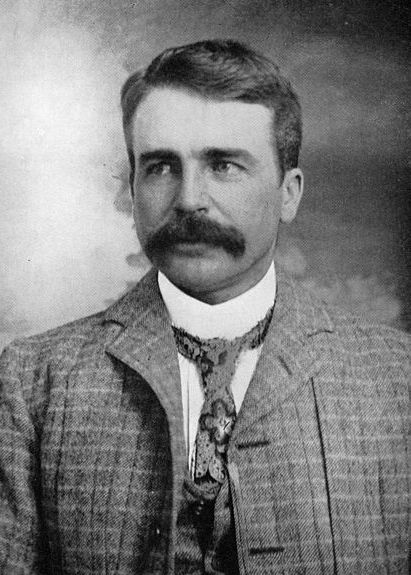
- Born: 15 August 1867; Litchfield, Hampshire, UK
- Died: 20 January 1943 (aged 75); Adelaide, Eastern Cape, South Africa
- Spouse: Ellen Augusta Dodd (m. 1904)
- Scientific career
- Fields: Chemistry

Ambrose Lomax (15 August 1867 – 20 January 1943) was a South African photographer and chemist.

== Background ==
Ambrose Lomax was born in England but grew up in the Cape when his family emigrated. He did his apprenticeship as a chemist in Queenstown, Eastern Cape, qualified at the age of 21, before beginning to do relief work.

He settled in Molteno, where he started his own business and photographic studio. The premises of his studios, also used as a pharmacy, still exist and are currently a museum.

== Chemist ==
Lomax was very interested in testing home remedies and how they could be used as formal medicine. When the Molteno bell tower was constructed in 1903, he registered an image of it as his trademark. Several of his brands swiftly became known nationally. He moved to Adelaide, Eastern Cape in 1909 and started a new business as A. Lomax Ltd which was very successful and run by his family after his death.

== Photographer ==
Lomax was also known for his early and high quality photographic image of Molteno and its people. He soon produced a renowned artistic collection, though he was as interested in the scientific methods of developing the quality of his images. During the Boer War he took hundreds of photographs of British soldiers and military themes. His collection of negatives was discovered in 1960 when his old photographic studio in Molteno was taken over by a new pharmaceutical firm. Approximately 1400 studies were found, offering a compelling picture of South Africa at the end of the 19th century and early 20th century.

His photographic art gallery in Molteno is today a prominent attraction.

== Private life and family ==
He was a very quiet man who seldom spoke. His primary pastime other than his work was his passion for golf. He married on 5 May 1904, Ellen Augusta Dodd, of Molteno. Of their eight children, three sons became physicians and a fourth qualified as a pharmacist.
