= Balele Mountains =

Mountain massif in the KwaZulu-Natal province in South Africa

- (Balelesberg / Belelasberg)
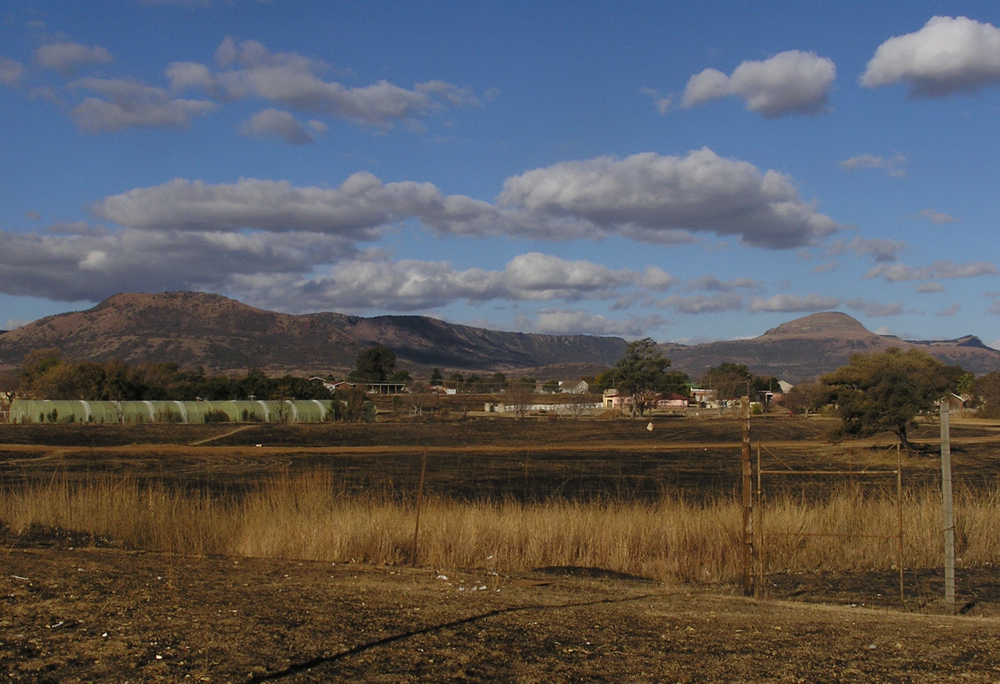
- Balele Mountains rising behind Utrecht

Highest point
- Peak: Vaalkop
- Elevation: 1,845 m (6,053 ft)
- Listing: List of mountain ranges of South Africa
- Coordinates: 27.5453°S 30.1392°E

Geography
- Location within South Africa
- Country: South Africa

Geology
- Rock type: dolerite

The Balele Mountains (Balelesberg or sometimes Belelasberg in Afrikaans) are a mountain massif largely located in the KwaZulu-Natal province in South Africa.

== Geography ==
The Balele Mountains stretch north of the town of Utrecht, which lies at their foot, south-east of Wakkerstroom and Volksrust (in Mpumalanga), and north-east of the Newcastle region. Vaalkop is the highest point.

== Geology ==
As on the eastern slopes of the Drakensberg, the dolerite dominates the collapsing cliffs of the Balele Mountains.

== History ==
Early in the 20th century, the Utrecht Collieries Company began mining coal in the Balele Mountains. In 1906, the governor of Natal decided to build a railway line between Utrecht and Newcastle. The line was inaugurated in 1910 by the then governor Lord Methuen.
