= Johannes Meintjes =

South African artist and writer (1923–1980)

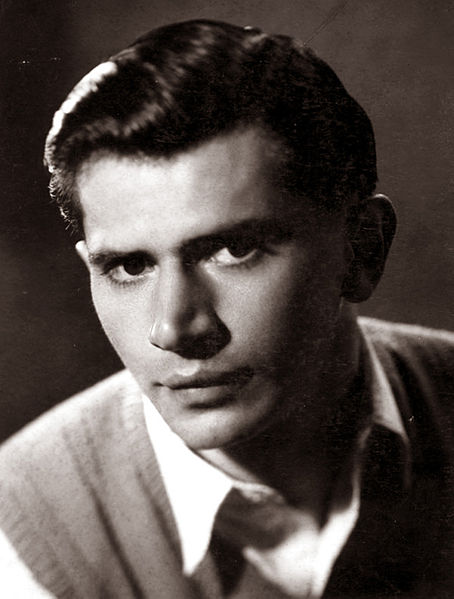
- Meintjes in 1945
- Born: Johannes Petrus Meintjes; 19 May 1923; Riversdale, South Africa
- Died: 7 July 1980 (aged 57); Molteno, South Africa
- Education: Hoërskool Jan van Riebeeck
- Occupations: Artist and writer

Johannes Petrus Meintjes (19 May 1923 – 7 July 1980) was a South African artist and writer.

Meintjes grew up on his family's farm in the mountains near Molteno. He lived and worked in Cape Town for several years, taught art, travelled for exhibitions and won a range of South African and international awards. In 1965 he retired to Molteno, where he focused on his writing. He went on to win several literary awards.
