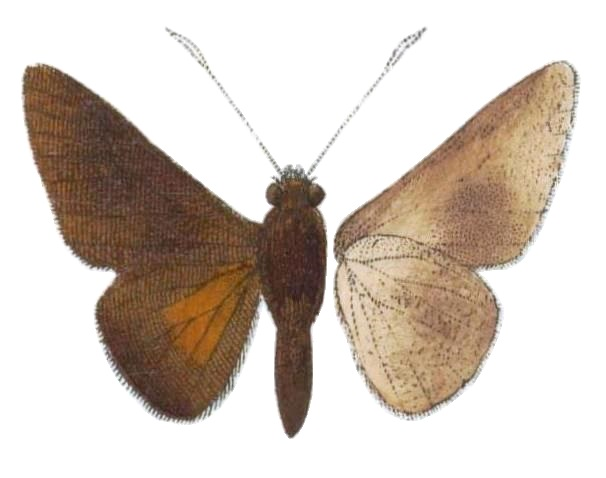
- M. fiara as Proteides fiara in Exotische Schmetterlinge

Scientific classification
- Domain: Eukaryota
- Kingdom: Animalia
- Phylum: Arthropoda
- Class: Insecta
- Order: Lepidoptera
- Family: Hesperiidae
- Genus: Moltena
- Species: M. fiara

Binomial name
- Moltena fiara (Butler, 1870)

Synonyms
- Proteides fiara Butler, 1870; Hesperia natalica Plötz, 1882

= Moltena fiara =

Strelitzia night-fighter

Species of butterfly

Moltena fiara, the strelitzia night-fighter or banana-tree night-fighter, is a butterfly of the family Hesperiidae. It is found in coastal lowland and riverine forest from the East Cape along the KwaZulu-Natal coast to Maputaland and north to Maputo in Mozambique.

The wingspan is 54–57 mm for males and 58–64 mm for females. Adults are on wing from August to October and from February to April. There are two generations per year.
