= Ferdie le Grange =

South African plastic surgeon and athlete

Personal information
- Nationality: South African
- Born: Ferdinand Andries; 26 August 1948 Molteno, Eastern Cape, South Africa
- Died: 29 October 2013 (aged 65) Germiston, South Africa
- Education: Stellenbosch University
- Occupation: Plastic Surgeon
- Spouse: Kathleen de Villiers

Sport
- Sport: Track and Road running

Achievements and titles
- Personal bests: Marathon: 2H12M; 10 000m: 28M55S; 5 000m: 13M46S; 1 Hour running: 20,3km; Two Oceans Ultra marathon: 3H53Mat age 45; Comrades Ultra Marathon: 6H44M at age 36

Ferdinand Andries le Grange (Ferdie; 26 August 1948 – October 2013) was a South African plastic surgeon and marathon runner who broke African records.

== Early life ==
He was born in Molteno, Eastern Cape, South Africa. His father was a farmer. After school, he studied medicine at Stellenbosch University and University of the Witwatersrand. He had a medical practise in Bedfordview Germiston, South Africa

He married Kathleen de Villiers, an anaesthetist, and their children were Loné, Jean, Michelle and Ferdie, Jr.

== Running career ==
In 1971 he was the first African runner to run a sub 2 hour 20 minutes marathon. He did it in a marathon in Durbanville with a time of 2 hours 19 minutes. His personal best was the South African open marathon on 23 April 1974 when he ran 2 hours 12 minutes. He was the first runner in the world to run two sub 2 hours 20 minutes marathons in one week. On 24 January 1974 in an hour race, he was the first in Africa to run more than 20 km in an hour. This was done on a grass track in Bellville, Western Cape. He broke Abebe Bikila's record.

He was the South African Marathon Champion in 1973 and 1974.

Due to the sporting boycott of South Africa during the apartheid era he never competed in the Olympic Games.

== Retirement from running ==
He retired from running at 25 to pursue a medical career. He used to run from Cape Town to Bellville at 12 o’clock at night after work. After his retirement from competitive running, he ran the Comrades Marathon and the Two Oceans Marathon.
