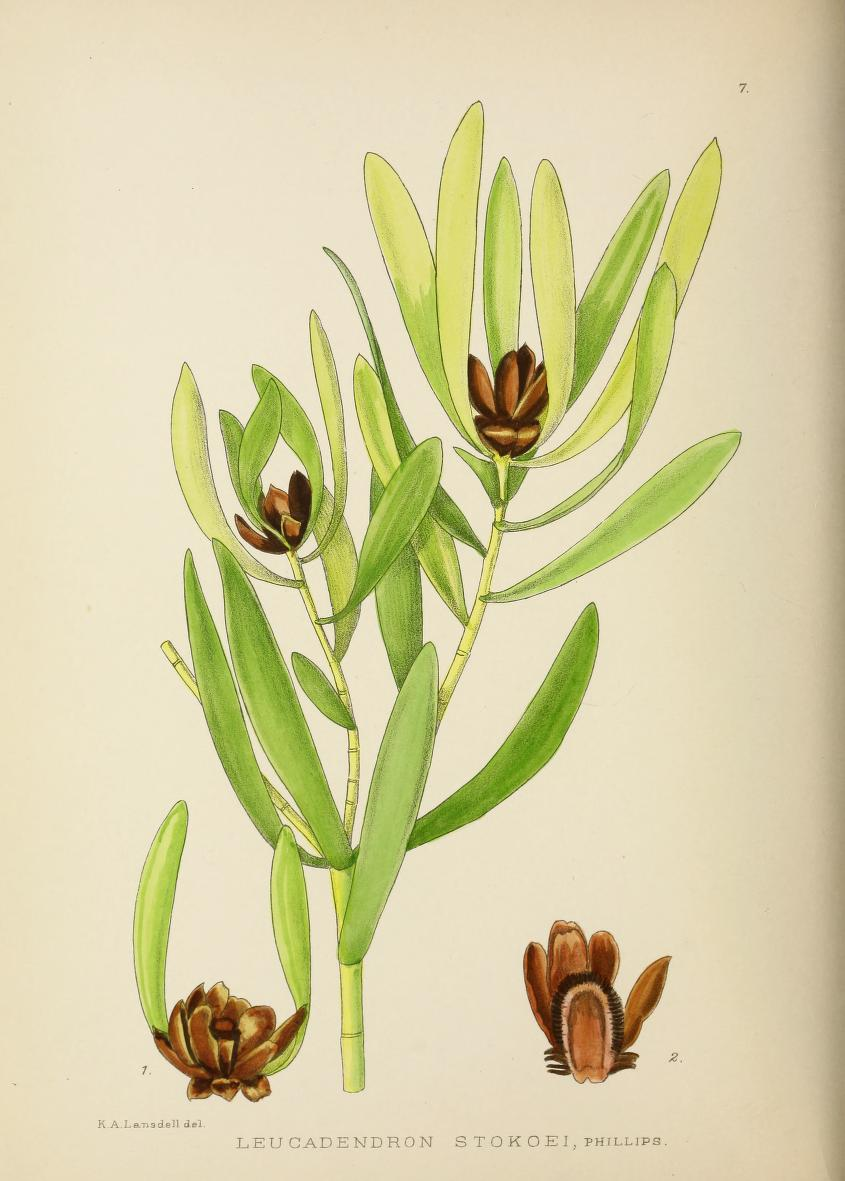
- Male inflorescence with longitudinal section
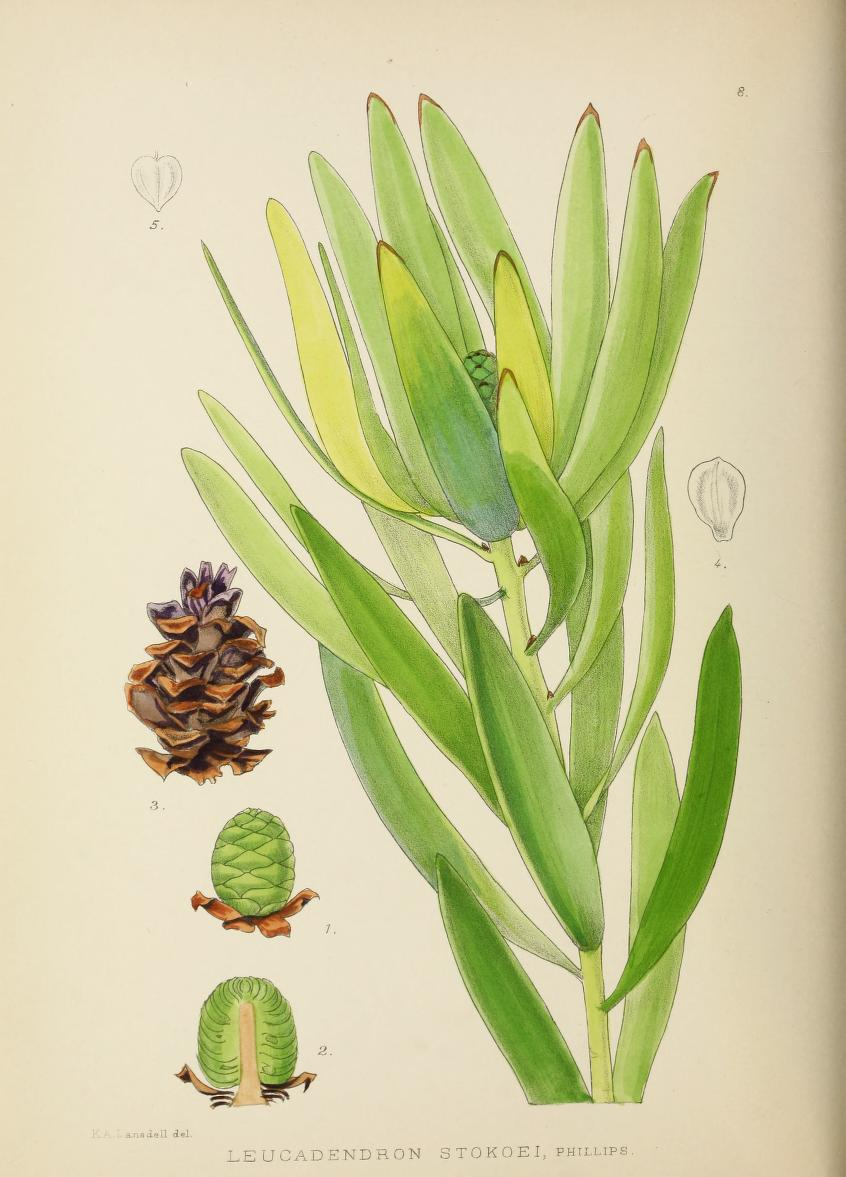
- Female inflorescence with longitudinal section, fruiting head, floral bract and fruit

Conservation status
- Least Concern (IUCN 3.1)

Scientific classification
- Kingdom: Plantae
- Clade: Embryophytes
- Clade: Tracheophytes
- Clade: Angiosperms
- Clade: Eudicots
- Order: Proteales
- Family: Proteaceae
- Genus: Leucadendron
- Species: L. microcephalum

Binomial name
- Leucadendron microcephalum Gand. & Schinz

Synonyms
- Leucadendron stokoei Phillips

= Leucadendron microcephalum =

Species of shrub endemic to South Africa

Leucadendron microcephalum, common name oilbract conebrush, is a dioecious, single-stemmed, South African shrub belonging to the family Proteaceae, endemic to the Western Cape and growing from sea level to 1,200 m (3,900 ft). It is one of some 200 species in the genus, all confined to South Africa.

== Description ==
The species is commonly known as the oilbract conebush' because of the brown, sticky, oily bracts found on both sexes when in bud, a feature setting it apart from other Leucadendron species. After flowering the bracts close, becoming hard and dry, forming a durable cone and protecting the enclosed flowerhead and heart-shaped fruits. This species produces hairless leaves some 90 mm (3.5 in) long, and bears beetle-pollinated yellow flowers in July and August - the male (about 18 mm diameter) and female (about 11 mm diameter) being on separate plants. Male shrubs are rounded and up to 1.5 m (4.9 ft) tall, while females are narrow-crowned and up to 2 m (6.6 ft) tall. The involucral leaves are yellow. The plants are killed by intense seasonal fires, but seeds retained in flower heads or woody capitula may survive for a number of years to produce the next generation.

== Taxonomy ==
Leucadendron microcephalum was first described by Michel Gandoger and Hans Schinz in 1913. Phillips mistakenly published it as a new species, L. stokoei, in 1921.

== Distribution and habitat ==
This is a highly gregarious species and is found in dense stands of hundreds of thousands of individuals, usually on mountainsides on stony sandstone soils, and particularly numerous in the vicinity of Villiersdorp. Its distribution covers Kogelberg, Kleinmond, Klein River, the Groenland Mountains north of Grabouw, Hottentots-Holland, Du Toit's Kloof Mountains, Riviersonderend Mountains, and the Swartberg above Caledon.

== Bibliography ==
- "The Proteaceae of Southern Africa" - J. P. Rourke (Purnell, 1980)
- "South Africa's Proteaceae" - Marie Vogts (Struik, 1982)
- "A Field Guide to the Proteas of Southern Africa" - Rebelo, Paterson-Jones (Fernwood, 1995)
