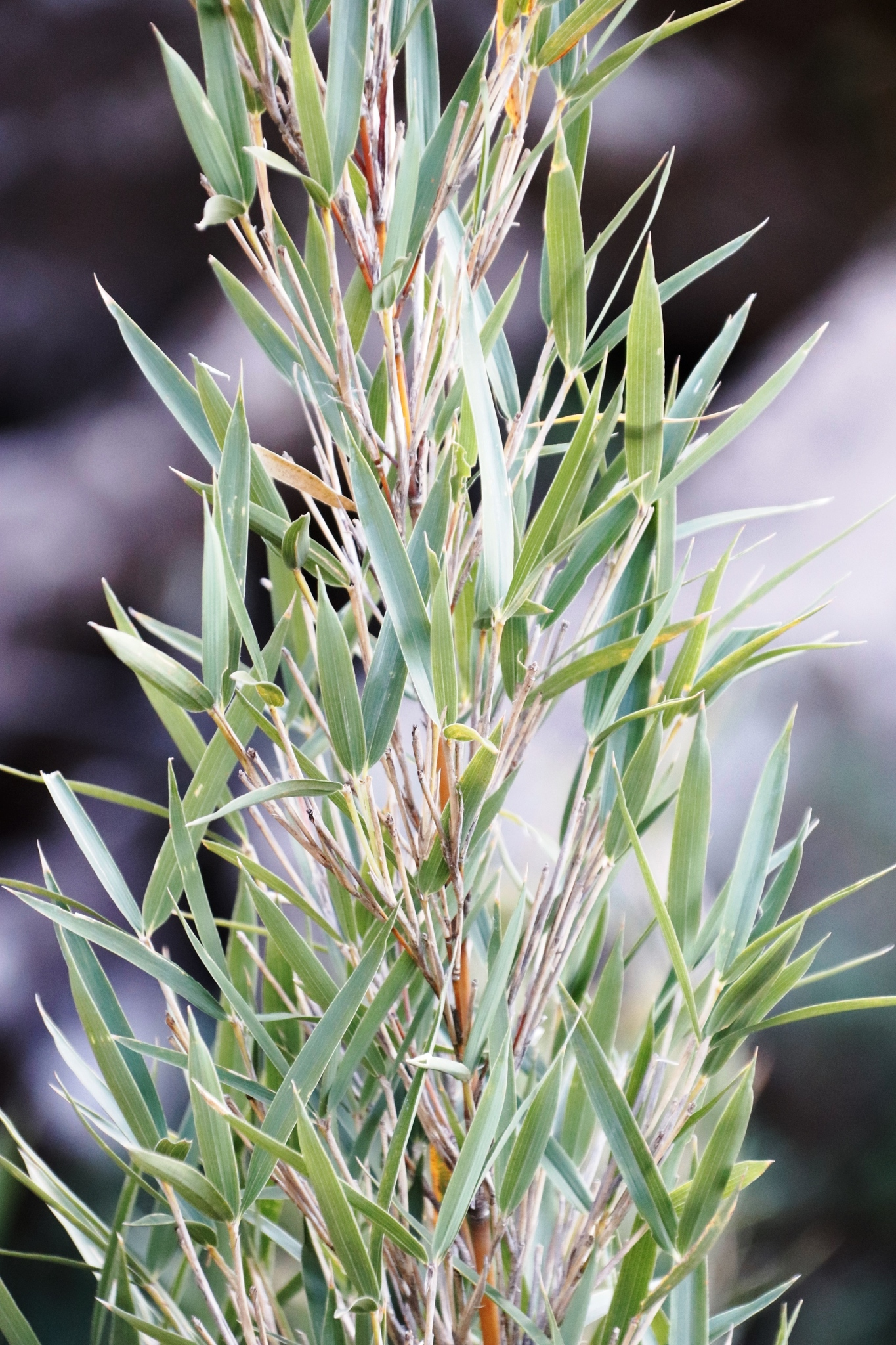

Conservation status
- Least Concern (SANBI Red List)

Scientific classification
- Kingdom: Plantae
- Clade: Tracheophytes
- Clade: Angiosperms
- Clade: Monocots
- Clade: Commelinids
- Order: Poales
- Family: Poaceae
- Subfamily: Bambusoideae
- Tribe: Arundinarieae
- Genus: Bergbambos; Stapleton (2013)
- Species: B. tessellata

Binomial name
- Bergbambos tessellata (Nees) Stapleton (2013)

Synonyms
- Arundinaria tessellata (Nees) Munro (1868); Nastus tessellatus Nees (1841); Thamnocalamus tessellatus (Nees) Soderstr. & R.P.Ellis (1982)

= Bergbambos =

Species of bamboo endemic to South Africa

Bergbambos tessellata is a bamboo native to the south-eastern highlands of South Africa and Lesotho. It is the sole species in the monotypic genus Bergbambos, belonging to the family Poaceae.

Its generic name means "bushy reed", while the specific name means "tiled", an allusion to the rectangular pattern of veins on the leaves. Its common names include mountain bamboo, drakensberg bamboo and bergbamboes and wildebamboes in Afrikaans.

== Distribution ==
Bergbambos is found at an elevation of 1500-2000 metres in South Africa (in the Cape Provinces, Free State, and KwaZulu-Natal), Lesotho and Swaziland along mountain side streams. It is found in the Amathole Mountains, the Bamboesberg (for which it is named), and the Drakensberg.

Bergbambos is one of two temperate bamboo species on the African mainland, and the only bamboo native to South Africa and Lesotho.

== Taxonomy ==
Specimens of this plant were collected in the 1820s and 1830s by Ecklon in the Winterberg which is an extension of the Amathole range, and by Drège at Katberg near the western end of the Amatola range, Table Mountain in the Queenstown district, the Bamboesberge in the Tarkastad district, the Witteberg above Lady Grey and other high mountainous areas in the Cape Colony, such as the Prentjiesberg north of Ugie. Neither collector found the plant in flower or seed so that its exact taxonomic position remained unclear until the 1900s when it was more fully described in "Flora Capensis". Nees, who first described it from sterile specimens in 1841 in his elaboration of the Gramineae of South Africa, thought it close to Nastus, and named it Nastus tessellata. Robert Harold Compton found it at Bulunga Poort southeast of Manzini and at Tulwane, in Swaziland during his 1955-66 botanical survey of that country. In 1982 Thomas Robert Soderstrom and Roger Pearson Ellis revised its classification and placed it with 5 other species in Thamnocalamus as T. tessellatus. In 2013, it was then transferred into its own genus, Bergbambos.

== Ecology ==
Bamboos are divided into three categories on the basis of their flowering cycle - annual flowering, irregular flowering and gregarious flowering occurring at long intervals with synchronised flower and seed production. Most bamboos belong to this last category with intermasts ranging from 3 to 120 years. Bergbambos belongs to this third category and flowers at 45 year intervals. Records from KwaZulu-Natal noting flowering in 1908, 1953 and 1998/99.

It is also a host of the IUCN Red List-listed vulnerable butterfly, the bamboo sylph (Metisella syrinx).

== Description ==
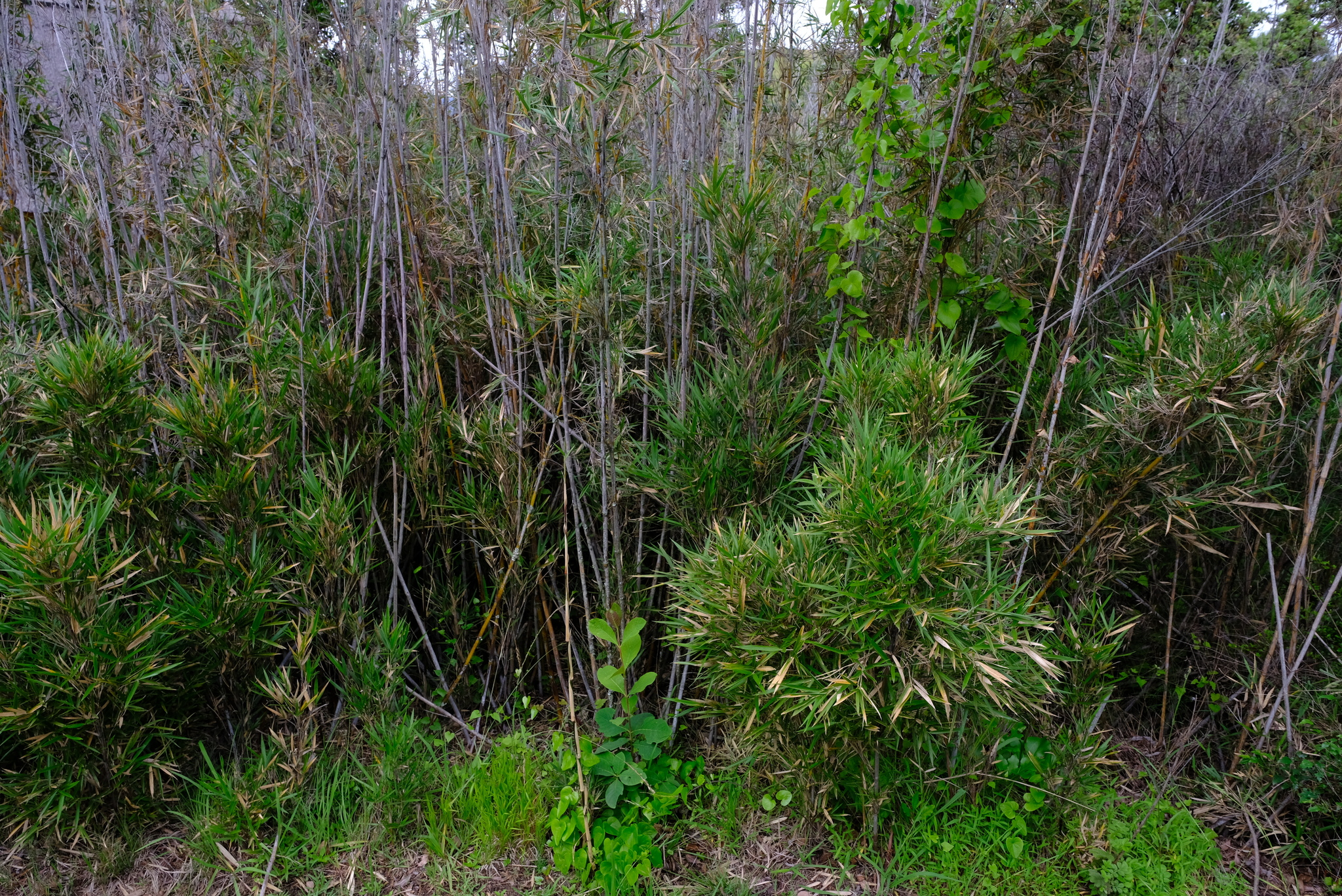
Bergbambos clump in uKhahlamba-Drakensberg Park

Often found in association with Leucosidea sericea, this frost-resistant species grows in dense clumps up to 5 metres tall, preferring moist rocky places, and has hollow culms or canes of 2-2.5 cm in diameter. The leaves at the base of branches are reduced to papery sheaths, while other leaves are 4–12 cm long and sharply pointed with spiny margins and a strongly tessellated surface.

== Conservation status ==
It was once regarded as rare and vulnerable, but is now classified as Least Concern. Current populations are threatened by fire and exploitation.

== Synonyms ==
- Arundinaria tessellata (Nees) Munro
- Nastus tessellatus Nees
- Thamnocalamus tessellatus (Nees) Soderstr. & R.P.Ellis
