= Komsberg =

Mountain range in South Africa

The Komsberg is a mountain range stretching east to west along the border of Northern Cape and Western Cape Provinces of South Africa. It lies north of Moordenaar's Karoo and forms part of an escarpment between the Roggeveld Mountains and the Nuweveld Mountains; at 45 km long, the Komsberg stretches from Verlatenkloof Pass to near the Dwyka River gorge. A tributary of the Gourits River, the Dwyka originates in the Komsberg. Komsberg Pass goes over the range, and its highest point is 1,742 m above sea level.

== Sources ==
- Cape West: 2nd edition. A relief map of the most southerly part of Africa.
