= Battle of Stormberg =

1899 battle of the Second Boer War

- Part of Second Boer War
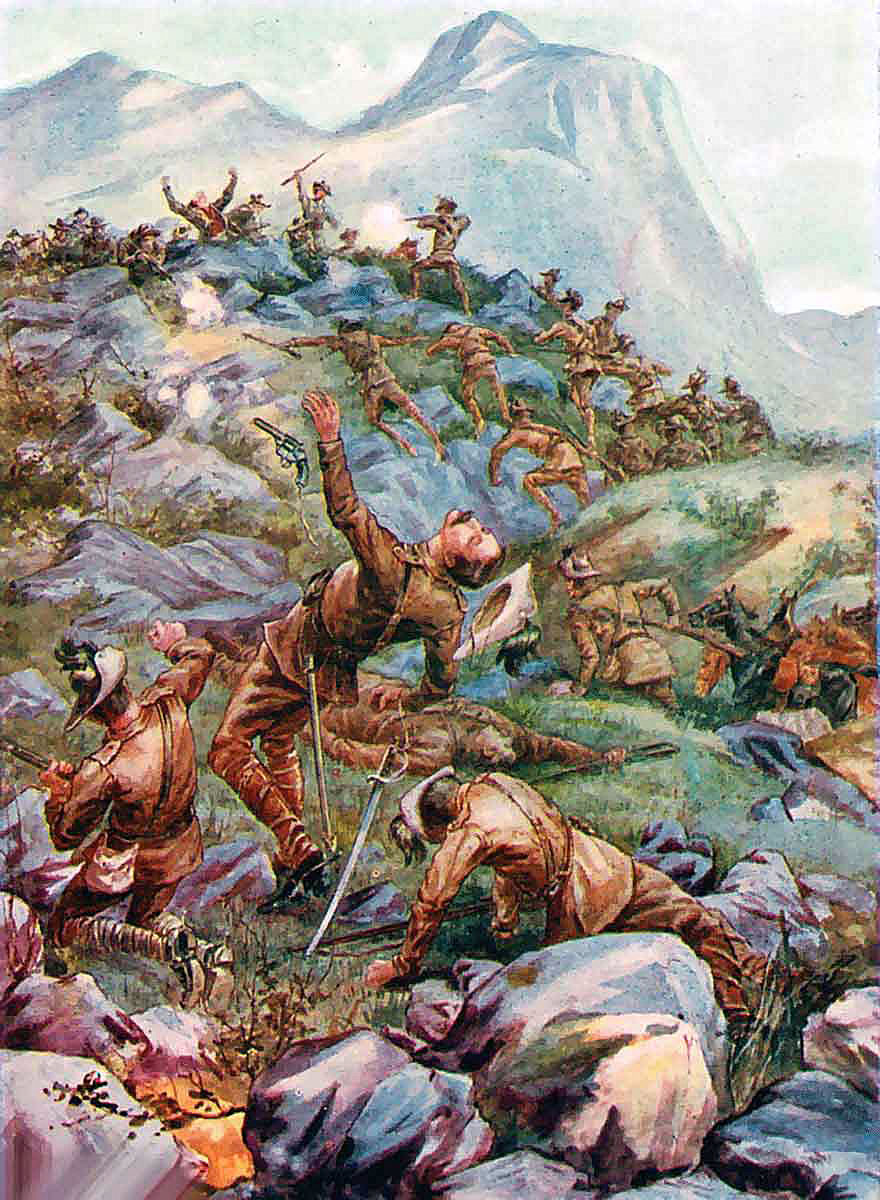
- Northumberland Fusiliers in action against the Boers.
Date	10 December 1899
Location	Stormberg, Cape Colony, South Africa 31°17′53″S 26°15′17″E
Result	Boer victory

Belligerents
United Kingdom	Orange Free State

Commanders and leaders
William Forbes Gatacre	Jan Hendrik Olivier

Strength
1,800 infantry 250 mounted troops 12 guns	2,300 men 3 guns

Casualties and losses
26 killed 68 wounded 696 captured	8 killed 26 wounded

The Battle of Stormberg was a British assault on Stormberg Junction on 10 December 1899 during the Second Boer War. At that time, the Boers had taken control of Molten and the heights around Stormberg Junction, as part of their invasion of Cape Colony. William Forbes Gatacre, the general in command of troops in the Cape Midlands, decided to dislodge the Boers from their position in order to secure the railway lines which supplied the larger March on Kimberley by Lord Methuen. Due to a failed night march and a badly coordinated assault, the Boers repulsed the British army, with the Northumberland Fusiliers suffering high casualties.

== Background ==
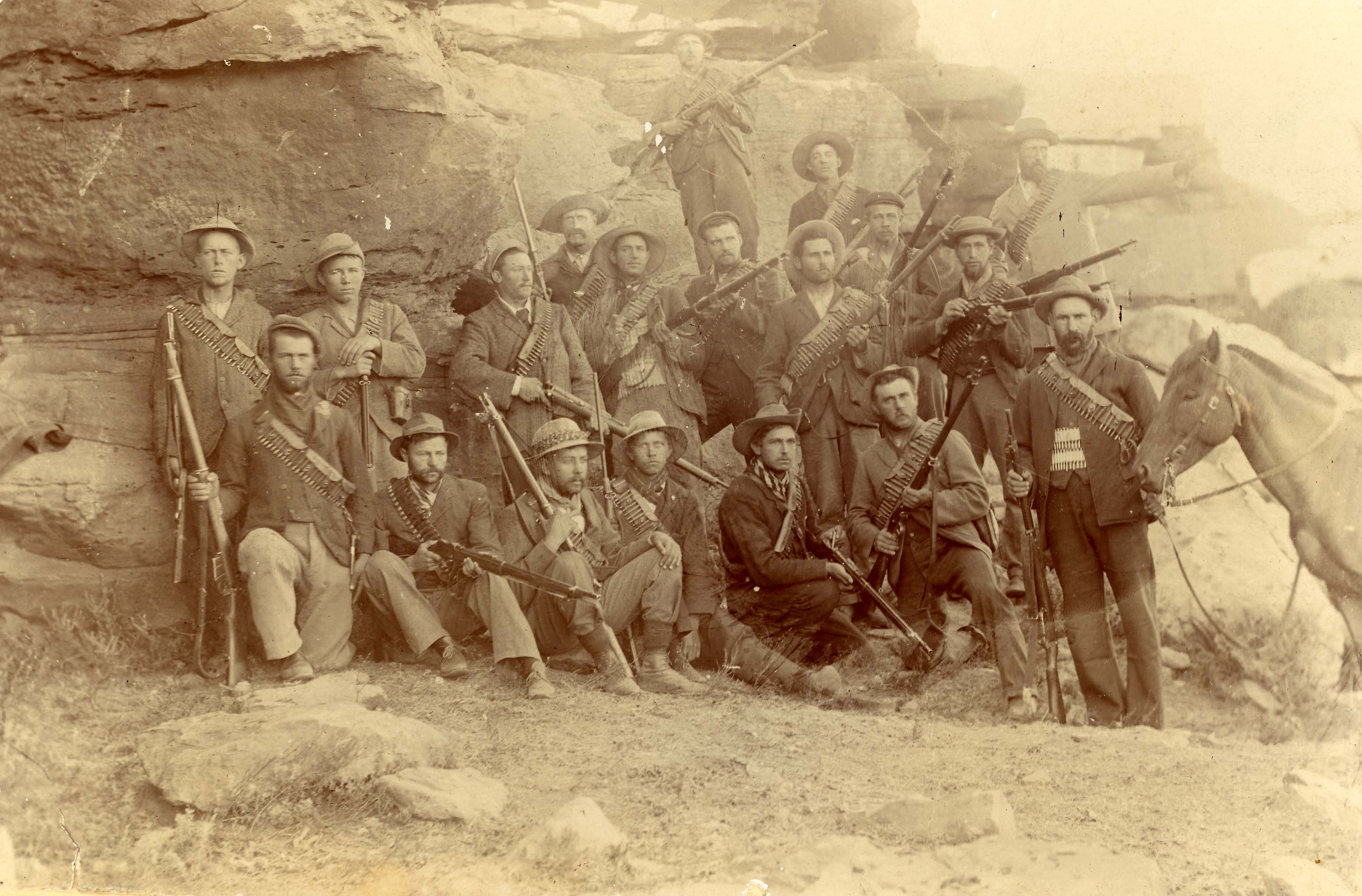
A group of Boer combatants just before the battle.

When the British first drew up a plan of campaign against the Boer republics, it was intended that the 3rd Division commanded by Major General William Forbes Gatacre would secure the area known as the Cape Midlands, immediately south of the Orange Free State, in preparation for an advance along the railway running from Cape Town to Bloemfontein. In the event, many of the division's troops had to be diverted to Natal after disasters there, and Gatacre's reduced force arrived late. By the time they were ready to take the field, Boers from the Orange Free State had already seized the important railway junction of Stormberg.

Gatacre heard of the loss of Stormberg on 8 December at Graaff Reinet. He determined to make an immediate counterattack to recover the place. A force of 3,000 was to be taken by train to Molteno, the nearest railway station to Stormberg still in British hands, and march by night to attack a hill known as the Kissieberg, which dominated the Boers' position. The force consisted of the 2nd Battalion, the Northumberland Fusiliers (960 men), the 2nd Battalion, the Royal Irish Rifles, (840 men), the 74th and 77th batteries of the Royal Field Artillery and 250 mounted infantry detached from various infantry battalions. Other detachments (including the 1st Battalion, the Royal Berkshire Regiment) which were intended to join the force failed to arrive because telegraph orders were not sent.

There was no time for reconnaissance, and preparations were rushed. Early the next day, the British troops hastily boarded the trains, but then sat for hours under a hot sun while locomotives were found. They were already tired when they reached Molteno, to set off on a night march with fixed bayonets after a hasty meal and very little rest. Gatacre's locally engaged guides were soon lost, and the force wandered about the veld all night.

== Battle ==
As dawn broke, the British at last came in sight of the Kissieberg. A small Boer picket with one 75mm Krupp gun under Sergeant Hendrik Muller of the Free State Artillery Corps, opened fire. Although Gatacre's force had merely to march around the hill to force the Boers to retreat, about half the infantry rushed forward without orders to storm it. They found that the hill was a typical kopje, ringed by a vertical rock face, which most of them were unable to climb. A few soldiers scrambled to the top, only to be swept off by the British guns which came into action with the rising sun in the gunners' eyes.

The commanding officer of the Northumberland Fusiliers took it on himself to order a retreat, and most of Gatacre's force began to fall back in disorder. Gatacre gave the order to retreat to Molteno. Mounted Boer reinforcements appeared and attacked from both sides. The retreat of the exhausted British infantry was covered by the mounted infantry and the artillery, although two 15-pounder guns were lost. Not until they reached Molteno did Gatacre realise that over 600 men had been left behind on the Kissieberg. Hopelessly cut off, they were forced to surrender.

== Aftermath ==
The Free State Boers and local rebels were slow to take advantage of Gatacre's defeat. By the time they did so, British reinforcements had arrived, and the area was secure.

Although General Sir Redvers Buller, the British Commander-in-Chief in South Africa, publicly ascribed the defeat to bad luck only, and it was also suggested that his guides had been treacherous, Gatacre was blamed by many soldiers and commentators for the defeat. He was known for restless activity and for imposing needless marches and labour on his troops. He remained in command of the understrength 3rd Division, but after General Lord Roberts replaced Buller as Commander-in-Chief, he was sidelined to various occupation and "mopping-up" duties. He was eventually relieved of command after failing to rescue the Royal Irish Rifles who surrendered to Orange Free State Commandant-General Christiaan de Wet after a siege at Reddersburg on 3 April 1900.

== See also ==
- Military history of South Africa

== Printed sources ==
- Sir Arthur Conan Doyle (1917). A History of The Great War (Chapter 10 - The Battle of Stormberg). George H. Doran company.
- Rayne Kruger (1964). Goodbye Dolly Grey: Story of the Boer War. New English Library. ISBN 0-7126-6285-5.
