= Kouebokkeveld Mountains =

Mountain range in Western Cape, South Africa

Koue Bokkeveld Mountains
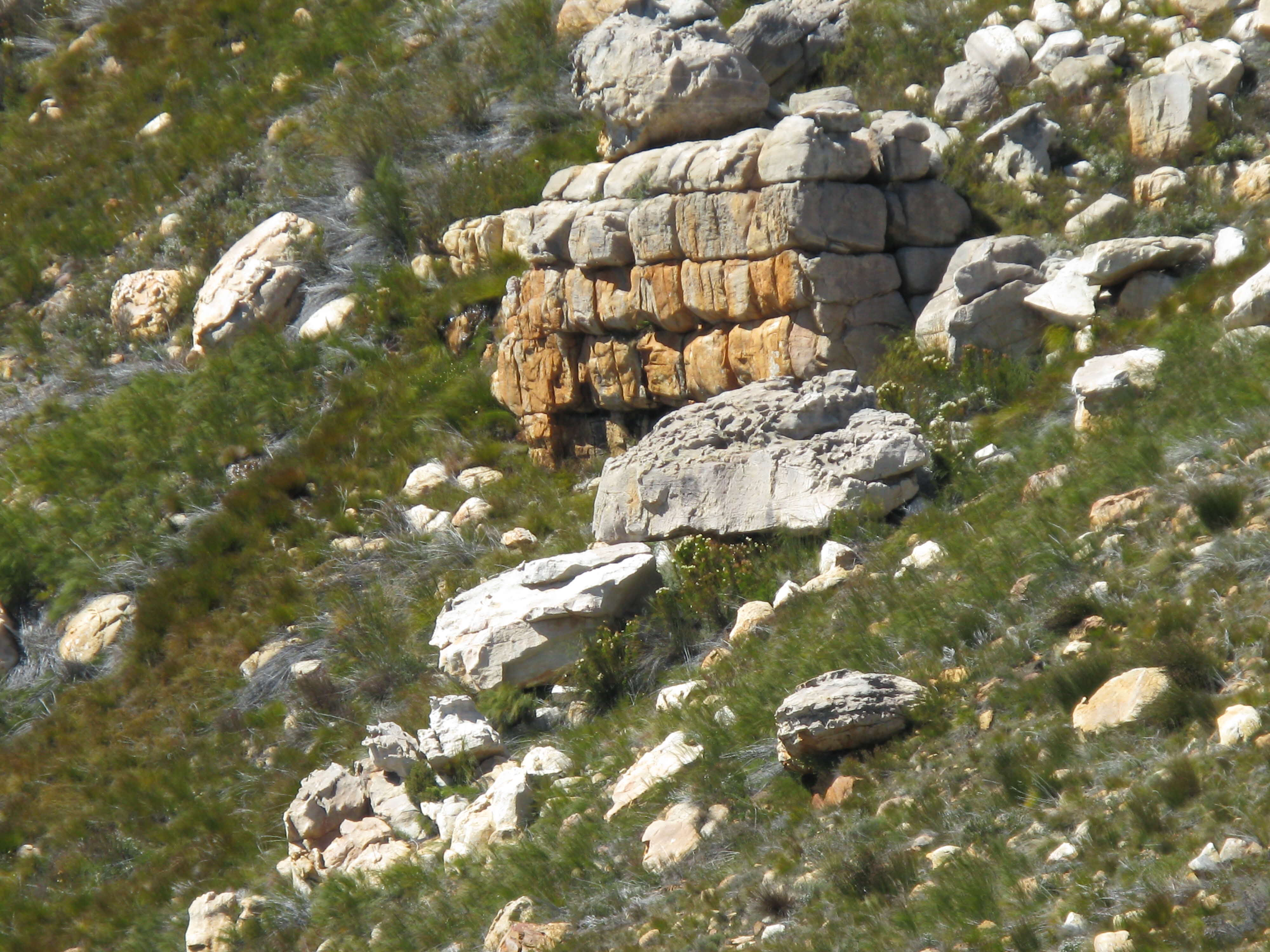
- The Cedarberg sandstone that makes up the Koue Bokkeveld has intriguing patterns of erosion and cracking. Here a bus-sized block split naturally into regular brick-like right parallelepipeds.

Highest point
- Elevation: 1,690 m (5,540 ft)
- Listing: List of mountain ranges of South Africa
- Coordinates: 32°12′0″S 19°25′0″E

Dimensions
- Length: 30 km (19 mi) WNW/ESE
- Width: 8 km (5.0 mi) ENE/WSW

Geography
- Location within South Africa
- Country: South Africa
- Province: Western Cape
- Parent range: Western Cape System

Geology
- Orogeny: Cape Fold Belt
- Rock age: Paleoproterozoic
- Rock type: Sandstone

Climbing
- Easiest route: From Prince Alfred Hamlet

The Koue Bokkeveld, meaning "Cold Buck Shrubland" in Afrikaans, is a mountain range in the Western Cape Province, South Africa. Geologically the range is composed of Cedarberg Sandstone of the Cape System.

== Location and extent ==
It is located above Prince Alfred Hamlet, north of Ceres, and south and east of Citrusdal. The range runs in a WNW-ESE direction with a tall escarpment on its southern and southwestern side. Elevations of the range are an average of 1,600 m and there is often snow in winter. These heights are one of the coldest places in the Western Cape in winter.

== Drainage ==
The Koue Bokkeveld falls within the Olifants/Doring system and the Doring River has its sources in this range, contributing substantially to the flow of the Olifants catchment area.

== Ecology ==
The flora of the Koue Bokkeveld is similar to the Cedarberg flora, with mountain fynbos at high altitudes, Karoo vegetation on the lower slopes and patches of Mountain cypress. Plants such as the oil bract conebush, a species of Leucadendron, may be found.

== Artifacts ==
There are ancient San rock paintings at a place called Katbakkies. A meteorite crashed on the Koue Bokkeveld in 1838. It is known as the Koue Bokkeveld or Cold Bokkeveld meteorite, and is a CM2 chondrite. Its fragments were dispersed and now most of them have been lost.

== See also ==
- List of mountain ranges of South Africa
