= Drakensberg hiking =

Popular outdoor activity in South Africa

Hiking in the Natal Drakensberg is a popular activity for experienced locals and visitors to South Africa. The escarpment allows one to hike on a cliff roughly 1000 m high that stretches for 240 km from Sentinel Buttress in the North to Bushman's Neck Didima camp in the South. Hiking is however not recommended for inexperienced hikers as conditions can change quickly and harsh weather can occur for extended periods.

KZN (KwaZulu-Natal) Wildlife distributes 6 1:50,000 maps that can be used while hiking in the Drakensberg. The maps use the Cape datum as the geodesic reference. GPS users should be careful to use the correct datum as WGS 84 is not always the default. Some GPS waypoints for the Drakensberg are listed below:

== List of GPS waypoints in WGS84 format ==
=== Pass Summits ===
- Bannerman Pass 29°15′11.7″S 29°25′10.9″E
- Beacon Buttress Gully 28°44′43.9″S 28°53′26.0″E
- Corner Pass (Rock) 29°12′45.6″S 29°24′27.7″E
- Giant's Castle Pass 29°20′55.3″S 29°27′51.4″E
- Gray's Pass 29°04′17.8″S 29°19′23.1″E
- Hilton's Pass (Rock) 29°10′51.5″S 29°21′20.0″E
- Isicatula Pass 29°46′53.3″S 29°07′46.5″E
- Judge Pass (Rock) 29°13′24.5″S 29°24′37.5″E
- Ka-Masihlenga Pass 29°23′52.0″S 29°25′08.7″E
- Langalibalele Pass 29°16′44.1″S 29°26′10.3″E
- Leslie's Pass 29°09′12.7″S 29°20′38.0″E
- Masubasuba Pass 29°37′13.6″S 29°17′04.6″E
- Mlambonja Pass 28°57′13.0″S 29°06′43.2″E
- Mzimkhulu Pass 29°40′41.0″S 29°09′53.6″E
- Ntonjelana Pass 28°56′20.1″S 29°05′36.8″E
- Organ Pipes Pass 29°00′38.3″S 29°10′56.1″E
- Ships Prow Pass (North Fork - Rock) 29°05′46.5″S 29°19′32.4″E
- Ships Prow Pass (South Fork) 29°05′58.7″S 29°19′31.4″E
- Tseketseke Pass 28°59′26.4″S 29°09′06.1″E

=== Caves ===
- Didima Cave 29°04′24.1″S 29°15′12.7″E
- Fergy's Cave 29°09′51.0″S 29°25′18.0″E
- Injasuti Summit Cave 29°11′50.2″S 29°22′17.1″E
- Marble Baths Cave 29°09′04.1″S 29°23′52.3″E
- Nkosazana Cave 29°04′31.4″S 29°19′12.0″E
- Sandleni Cave 29°39′12.2″S 29°13′00.6″E
- Shepherd's Cave 28°51′53.4″S 28°59′45.1″E
- Spare Rib Cave 29°15′12.3″S 29°25′41.6″E
- Twins Cave 28°57′04.5″S 29°06′47.0″E
- Wonder Valley Cave 29°05′10.4″S 29°25′38.1″E
- Zulu Cave 29°01′35.4″S 29°20′54.3″E

=== Peaks ===
- Bannerman Face 29°15′42.9″S 29°25′54.7″E
- Castle Buttress 29°00′23.3″S 29°10′56.8″E
- Cathedral Peak 28.9233°S 29.1344°E
- Champagne Castle Dome 29°05′36.9″S 29°19′51.6″E
- Cleft Peak 29°00′06.3″S 29°10′02.6″E
- Cockade Peak 28°58′51.4″S 29°08′17.2″E
- Erskine 29°17′07.6″S 29°26′10.7″E
- Gypaetus Point 29°14′59.0″S 29°25′33.3″E
- Injasuti Dome 29°12′14.5″S 29°22′16.6″E
- Injasuti Greater Buttress 29°10′24.1″S 29°21′39.3″E
- Injasuti Lesser Buttress 29°10′50.9″S 29°21′37.1″E
- Katana 29°19′15.0″S 29°27′04.8″E
- Mafadi 29°12′08.4″S 29°21′25.5″E
- Mashai 29°44′20.8″S 29°08′15.8″E
- Matebeng 29°43′06.3″S 29°08′42.1″E
- Mount Durnford 29°18′23.7″S 29°26′23.3″E
- No Man's Peak 29°40′16.9″S 29°11′21.9″E
- Popple Peak 29°13′43.5″S 29°24′23.1″E
- Redi 29°24′42.4″S 29°25′15.5″E
- Stimela Peak 28°50′27.6″S 28°56′51.5″E
- Tareteng 29°24′13.0″S 29°25′07.3″E
- Thabana Ntlenyana 29°28′05.9″S 29°16′09.2″E
- The Corner 29°12′37.9″S 29°24′20.1″E
- The Judge 29°13′20.9″S 29°24′54.2″E
- The Twins 28°57′01.1″S 29°06′51.2″E
- Trojan Wall 29°12′04.5″S 29°22′49.0″E
- Verkyker Peak 29°41′38.5″S 29°09′43.8″E
- Wilson's Peak 29°43′37.4″S 29°08′53.1″E

=== Escarpment ===
- Stimela Saddle 28°50′27.9″S 28°56′35.9″E
- River (T43) 28°55′29.1″S 29°01′38.5″E
- River bend (W43) 28°55′21.1″S 29°03′40.1″E
- Path going around Elephant (AD49) 28°58′34.0″S 29°07′14.9″E
- Saddle (AF51) 28°59′57.1″S 29°09′03.8″E
- Saddle (AG52) 29°00′24.7″S 29°09′25.6″E
- Path behind Windsor Castle (AK54) 29°01′19.1″S 29°11′58.3″E
- Start of Yodler's Cascade Valley (AL58) 29°03′22.6″S 29°12′23.8″E
- Yodler's Cascades (AM59) 29°04′09.7″S 29°13′27.6″E
- Gully to climb up to Pampiring (AO61) 29°04′51.9″S 29°14′13.9″E
- Pampiring Saddle (AP61) 29°05′07.4″S 29°15′11.9″E
- Watershed Saddle (AQ61) 29°05′13.7″S 29°15′45.6″E
- Watershed Saddle (AU60) 29°04′36.6″S 29°17′58.9″E
- Watershed Saddle (AW62) 29°05′22.3″S 29°19′04.9″E
- Saddle (AX64) 29°06′58.9″S 29°20′05.8″E
- Spot height 3375m (AY72) 29°11′20.1″S 29°20′42.0″E
- Watershed Saddle 3360m (BA74) 29°12′19.2″S 29°21′55.1″E
- Watershed Saddle (BB74) 29°12′11.2″S 29°22′38.8″E
- Popple Saddle (BE77) 29°13′48.6″S 29°24′38.0″E
- Bannerman Face Saddle (BG80) 29°15′35.0″S 29°25′29.9″E
- Watershed Saddle (BJ89) 29°20′31.4″S 29°27′12.1″E
- Saddle 2985m (BA102) 29°27′06.5″S 29°22′11.0″E

=== Huts ===
- Bannerman Hut 29°15′03.5″S 29°26′33.0″E
- Centenary Hut 29°11′42.0″S 29°25′35.9″E
- Giant's Castle Lodge 29°15′59.5″S 29°31′15.0″E
- Injasuti Hutted Camp 29°07′07.5″S 29°26′17.7″E
- Old Fire Lookout 29°00′15.8″S 29°13′30.4″E
- Sani Top Lodge 29°35′04.7″S 29°17′17.9″E
- Tseketseke Hut 28°59′29.5″S 29°10′39.5″E

=== Campsites ===
- Campsite at the bottom of Cockade Pass 28°58′20.2″S 29°08′58.1″E
- Gatberg North Campsite 29°02′51.1″S 29°19′08.7″E
- Gatberg South Campsite 29°02′54.9″S 29°20′52.7″E
- Keith Bush Camp 29°04′02.6″S 29°20′20.1″E
- Monk's Cowl Forest Station 29°02′59.4″S 29°24′19.4″E
- Campsite at the bottom of Tseketseke Pass 28°59′22.4″S 29°10′53.2″E

=== Path Junctions ===
- C9 28°59′05.7″S 29°12′23.6″E
- C10 28°59′30.5″S 29°13′47.1″E
- C11 29°00′02.3″S 29°14′44.2″E
- G5 29°08′19.4″S 29°26′07.4″E
- G6 29°09′11.7″S 29°25′14.8″E
- M7 29°07′14.2″S 29°24′25.6″E
- M23 29°05′37.7″S 29°25′44.5″E
- M24 29°05′45.9″S 29°24′58.1″E
- M25 29°06′08.4″S 29°25′50.0″E
- Blind Man's Corner 29°03′56.0″S 29°22′19.5″E
- Camel Pass fork in Organ Pipes Pass 29°00′37.5″S 29°11′05.2″E
- Ship's Prow Pass Fork 29°06′07.6″S 29°20′31.0″E
- Thuthumi Pass Fork on Organ Pipes Ridge 29°00′16.6″S 29°13′42.3″E
- Turnoff to Waterfall Cave 28°54′54.3″S 29°06′16.0″E
