= List of mountains in South Africa =

List of Mountains in South Africa, Lesotho and Eswatini is a general list of mountains in South Africa, Lesotho and Eswatini with elevation. This list includes mountains in two other sovereign states, in the Stormberg-Drakensberg range, where the highest elevations are to be found in Lesotho, as well as Emlembe, the highest mountain in Eswatini, located at the border with South Africa. The highest mountain in South Africa is the 3,450-metre-high (11,320-foot) Mafadi, located on the border of South Africa and Lesotho.

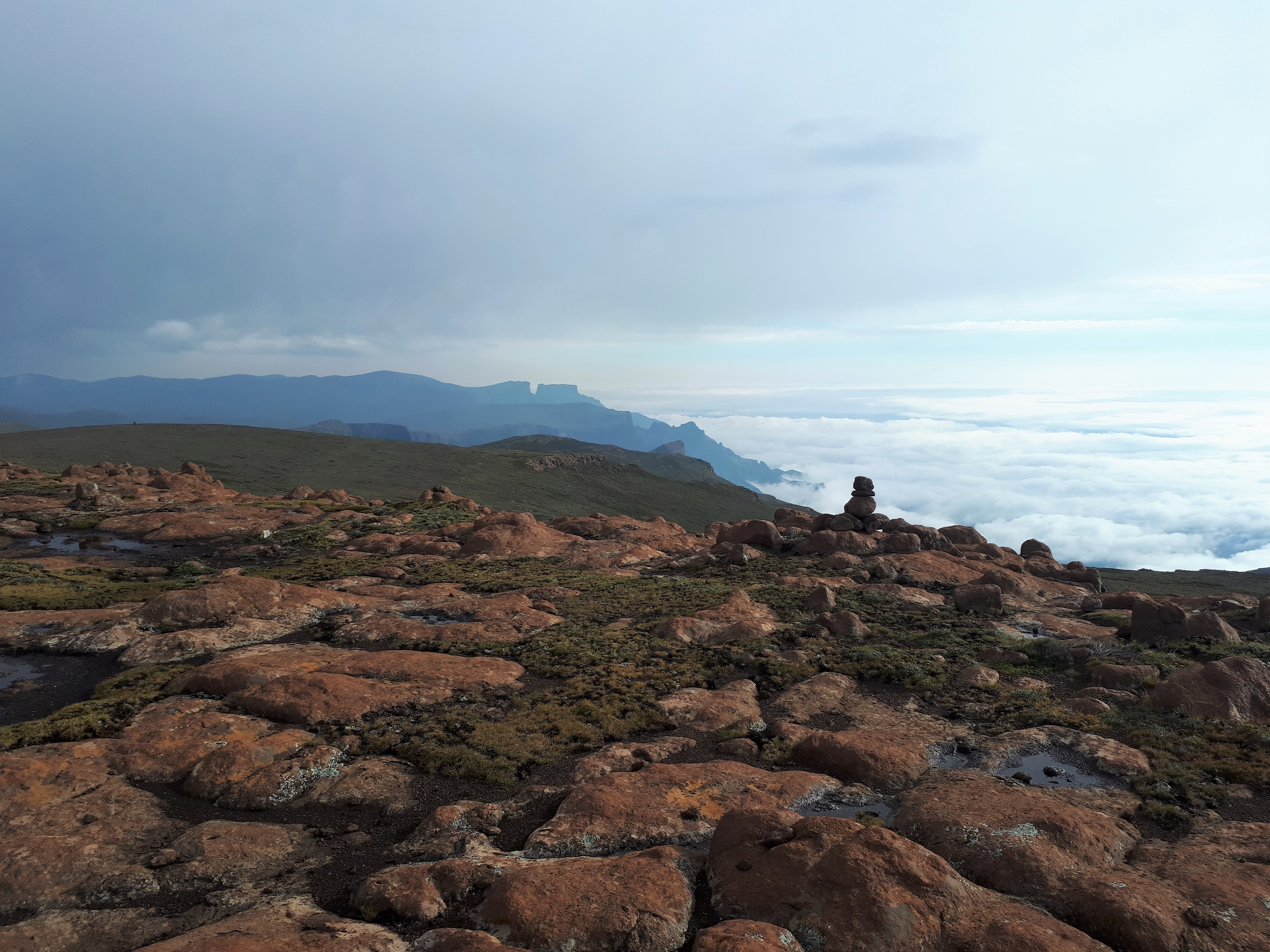
Mafadi mountain, The tallest mountain in South Africa

Several of the highest peaks have snow in the Southern Hemisphere winter season.

A Khulu is a peak above 3,000 m (9,800 ft) and not within 1 km (0.62 mi) of another Khulu, as defined by the Mountain Club of South Africa. Seweweekspoortpiek and Du Toits Peak are among the ultra prominent peaks of Africa.

A few mountains, such as Spion Kop or Isandlwana are historically important hills, even though they are relatively not very high. Table Mountain is important because of its emblematic flatness.

== List ==
Mountain	Height (m)	Height (ft)	Range	location	Remarks
Thabana Ntlenyana	3,482	11,424	Drakensberg (Maloti)	Lesotho	Highest mountain in Southern Africa
Makheka Peak	3,463	11,362	Drakensberg (Maloti)	Lesotho	
Mafadi	3,451	11,322	Drakensberg	KwaZulu-Natal	
Njesuthi	3,410	11,190	Drakensberg	KwaZulu-Natal	
Champagne Castle	3,377	11,079	Drakensberg	KwaZulu-Natal	
Lithobolog	3,375	11,073	Drakensberg	KwaZulu-Natal	
kaNtuba Peak	3,366	11,043	Drakensberg	KwaZulu-Natal	
Trojan Wall	3,354	11,004	Drakensberg	KwaZulu-Natal	
kaNtuba Buttress	3,344	10,971	Drakensberg	KwaZulu-Natal	
Yodler's Peak I	3,338	10,951	Drakensberg	KwaZulu-Natal	
Yodler's Peak II	3,338	10,951	Drakensberg	KwaZulu-Natal	
Pampiring	3,337	10,948	Drakensberg	KwaZulu-Natal	
Red Wall Peak	3,337	10,948	Drakensberg	KwaZulu-Natal	
Botlolong	3,333	10,935	Drakensberg	KwaZulu-Natal	
Popple Peak	3,331	10,928	Drakensberg	KwaZulu-Natal	
Ship's Prow	3,325	10,909	Drakensberg	KwaZulu-Natal	
Sehonghong Peak	3,324	10,906	Drakensberg	KwaZulu-Natal	
Nkosozana Peak	3,318	10,886	Drakensberg	KwaZulu-Natal	
Champagne's Castle	3,318	10,886	Drakensberg	KwaZulu-Natal	
Giant's Castle	3,315	10,876	Drakensberg	KwaZulu-Natal	
Mashai	3,313	10,869	Drakensberg	KwaZulu-Natal	
Mohlesi	3,310	10,860	Drakensberg	KwaZulu-Natal	
Redi	3,309	10,856	Drakensberg	KwaZulu-Natal	
Walker's Peak	3,306	10,846	Drakensberg	KwaZulu-Natal	
Mhlwazini Peak	3,305	10,843	Drakensberg	KwaZulu-Natal	
Yodler's Ridge Peak	3,301	10,830	Drakensberg	KwaZulu-Natal	
Sanqebethu	3,301	10,830	Drakensberg	KwaZulu-Natal	
Mount Durnford	3,296	10,814	Drakensberg	KwaZulu-Natal	
Mont-aux-Sources	3,282	10,768	Drakensberg	KwaZulu-Natal	
Cleft Peak	3,281	10,764	Drakensberg	KwaZulu-Natal	
Namahadi Peak	3,275	10,745	Drakensberg (Maloti)	Free State	
Monk's Cowl	3,229	10,594	Drakensberg	KwaZulu-Natal	
Cathkin Peak	3,148	10,328	Drakensberg	KwaZulu-Natal	
The Tent	3,130	10,270	Drakensberg	KwaZulu-Natal	
Thaba Putsoa	3,096	10,157	Drakensberg (Maloti)	Lesotho	
Didima Dome	3,078	10,098	Drakensberg	KwaZulu-Natal	
The Hawk	3,077	10,095	Drakensberg	KwaZulu-Natal	
Rhino Peak	3,056	10,026	Drakensberg	KwaZulu-Natal	
Thumb Spur Peak	3,055	10,023	Drakensberg	KwaZulu-Natal	
Devil's Knuckles	3,028	9,934	Drakensberg	KwaZulu-Natal	
KwaDuma	3,019	9,905	Drakensberg	Eastern Cape	
Cathedral Peak	3,004	9,856	Drakensberg	KwaZulu-Natal	
Ben Macdhui	3,001	9,846	Drakensberg	Eastern Cape	
Twins Top	3,000	9,800	Drakensberg	KwaZulu-Natal	
Sterkhorn	2,973	9,754	Drakensberg	KwaZulu-Natal	
Ribbokkop	2,829	9,281	Rooiberge	Free State	
Cairntoul	2,826	9,272	Drakensberg	Eastern Cape	
Edge Hill	2,725	8,940	Witteberge	Eastern Cape	
Balloch Peak	2,648	8,688	Witteberge	Eastern Cape	
Compassberg	2,502	8,209	Sneeuberge	Eastern Cape	
Visierskerf Peak	2,470	8,100	Witteberg	Free State	
Mount Horeb	2,418	7,933	Drakensberg (Maloti)	Free State	
The Great Winterberg	2,371	7,779	Winterberg	Eastern Cape	
Platberg Mountain	2,394	7,854	Harrismith	Free State	
Die Berg	2,331	7,648	Steenkampsberge	Mpumalanga	
Seweweekspoortpiek	2,325	7,628	Klein-Swartberge	Western Cape	
Mount Anderson	2,284	7,493	Drakensberg	Mpumalanga	
Matroosberg	2,249	7,379	Hex River Mountains	Western Cape	
Kriegersbaken	2,156	7,073	Sneeuberge	Northern Cape	
Ysterkroon	2,126	6,975	Wolkberg	Limpopo	
Groot Winterhoek	2,077	6,814	Groot Winterhoek	Western Cape	
Sneeukop	2,070	6,790	Skurweberg	Western Cape	
Serala	2,050	6,730	Wolkberg	Limpopo	
Sneeuberg	2,028	6,654	Cederberg	Western Cape	
Du Toits Peak	1,995	6,545	Klein Drakensteinberge	Western Cape	
Gaika's Kop	1,963	6,440	Amatola Mountains	Eastern Cape	
Toringkop	1,913	6,276	Suikerbosrand	Gauteng	
Emlembe	1,862	6,109	Drakensberg	KwaZulu-Natal	on S.A./Eswatini border
Geelhoutkop	1,805	5,922	Waterberg Massif	Limpopo	
Nooitgedacht West	1,805	5,922	Magaliesberg	North West	
Cockscomb	1,768	5,801	Groot Winterhoekberg	Eastern Cape	
Lajuma	1,747	5,732	Soutpansberg	Limpopo	
Hanglip	1,719	5,640	Soutpansberg	Limpopo	
Rooiberg Peak	1,706	5,597	Kamiesberge	Northern Cape	
Pilanesberg	1,687	5,535	Witwatersrand	North West	
Formosa Peak	1,675	5,495	Tsitsikamma	Eastern Cape	
Impati Mountain	1,595	5,233	Drakensberg	KwaZulu-Natal	
Cradock Peak	1,578	5,177	Outeniqua Mountains	Western Cape	
Spion Kop	1,460	4,790	Drakensberg	KwaZulu-Natal	
Isandlwana	1,284	4,213	Drakensberg	KwaZulu-Natal	
Carolusberg	1,274	4,180	Kamiesberg	Northern Cape	
Mascarin Peak	1,230	4,040	Marion Island	Prince Edward Islands	
Ghaamsberg	1,148	3,766		Northern Cape	close to Aggeneys
Table Mountain	1,084	3,556		Western Cape	rising over Cape Town
Van Zinderen-Bakker Peak	672	2,205	Prince Edward Island	Prince Edward Islands	smallest South Africa mountain

== See also ==
- Geography of South Africa
- List of Ultras of Africa
- List of mountain ranges of South Africa
- Highest mountain peaks of Africa
