= Impati Mountain =

Mountain in South Africa

Impati
- Location within KwaZulu-Natal

Highest point
- Elevation: 1,595 m (5,233 ft)
- Listing: List of mountains in South Africa
- Coordinates: 28°6′21″S 30°12′44″E

Geography
- Location: KwaZulu-Natal
- Parent range: Drakensberg

Impati Mountain is a mountain near the town of Dundee in the province of KwaZulu-Natal, South Africa. The name "Impati" is a Zulu word meaning "leader". As the name implies, the mountain stands out noticeably, compared to the surrounding hills due to its elevation. Its foothills were the scene of the Battle of Talana Hill during the Second Boer War.

Doctor Alden Lloyd Nature Conservation Area is located in this mountain.
