= Cleft Peak (South Africa) =

Mountain in South Africa

Coordinates: 29°00′S 29°10′E

Cleft Peak is a mountain peak in the Drakensberg in KwaZulu-Natal. It forms part of an escarpment of the Drakensberg on the border between South Africa and Lesotho. Cleft Peak is the second-highest peak in the northern part of the region, after Mont-aux-Sources, several meters higher.

The easiest climb is from the Mlabonja Valley and the Organ Pipes Pass. The climb is steep to the escarpment, from which one can hike up the hillsides to the peak.

== See also ==
- List of mountains in South Africa
