= Emlembe =

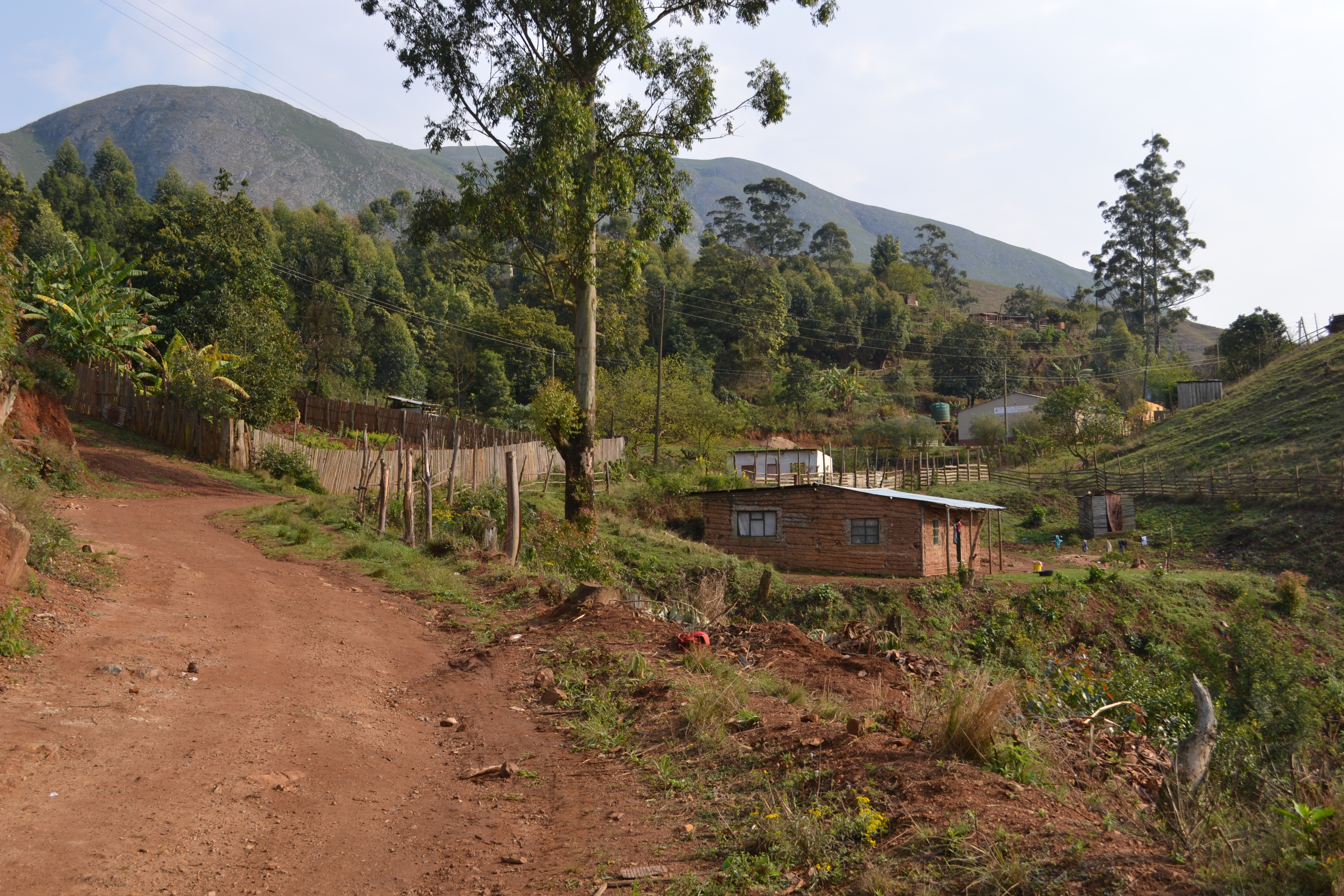
- Emlembe in 2015

Highest point
- Elevation: 1,862 m (6,109 ft)
- Listing: Country high point List of mountains in South Africa
- Coordinates: 25°55′00″S 31°08′00″E

Geography
- Location within Eswatini
- Location: Eswatini / South Africa
- Parent range: Drakensberg

Emlembe is the highest mountain in the African country of Eswatini. It is located in the east uKhahlamba (or Drakensberg) mountain range, on the border with South Africa. It is located in the South African province of Mpumalanga and the Swazi province of Hhohho.
