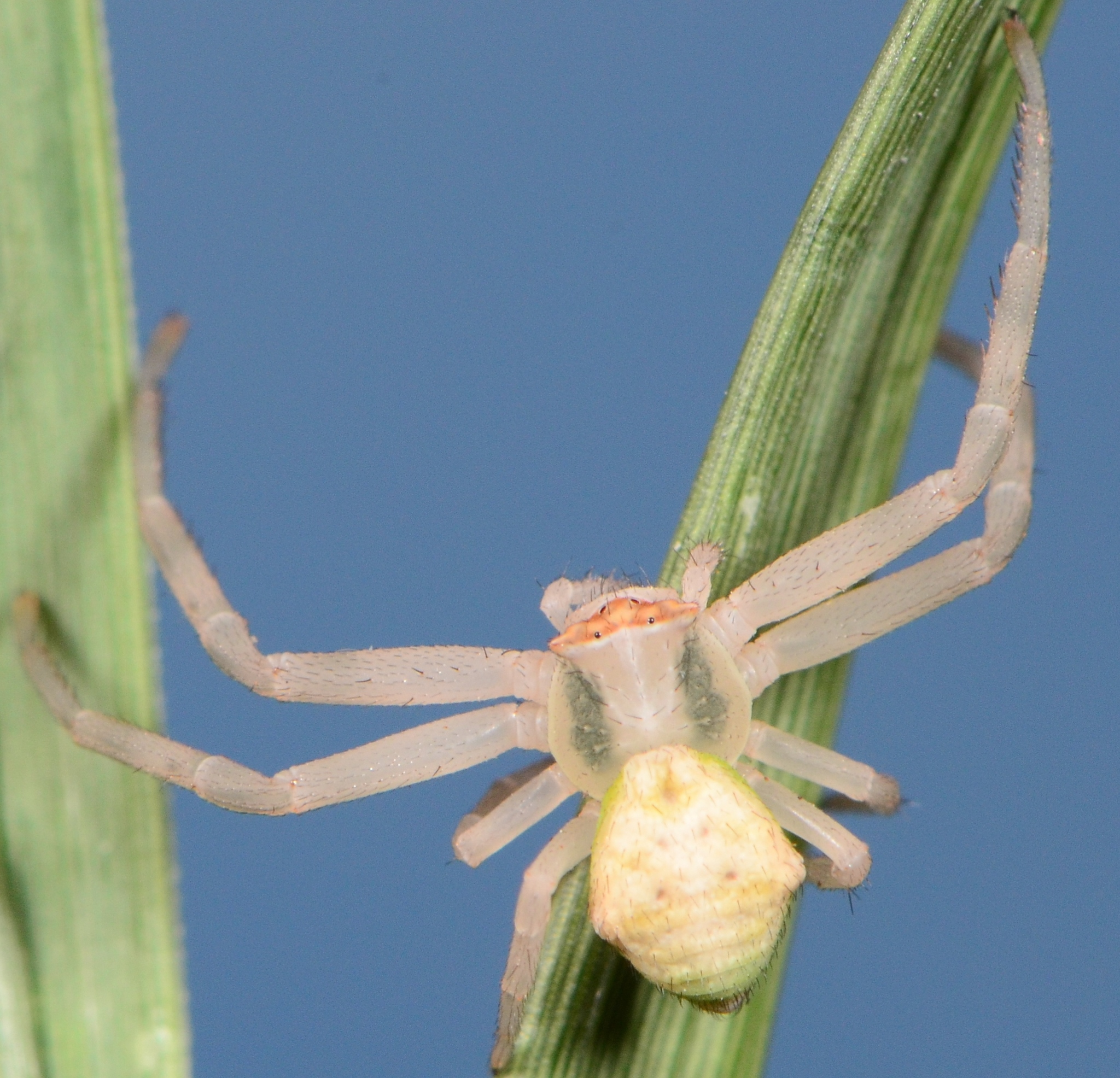
- female from South Africa
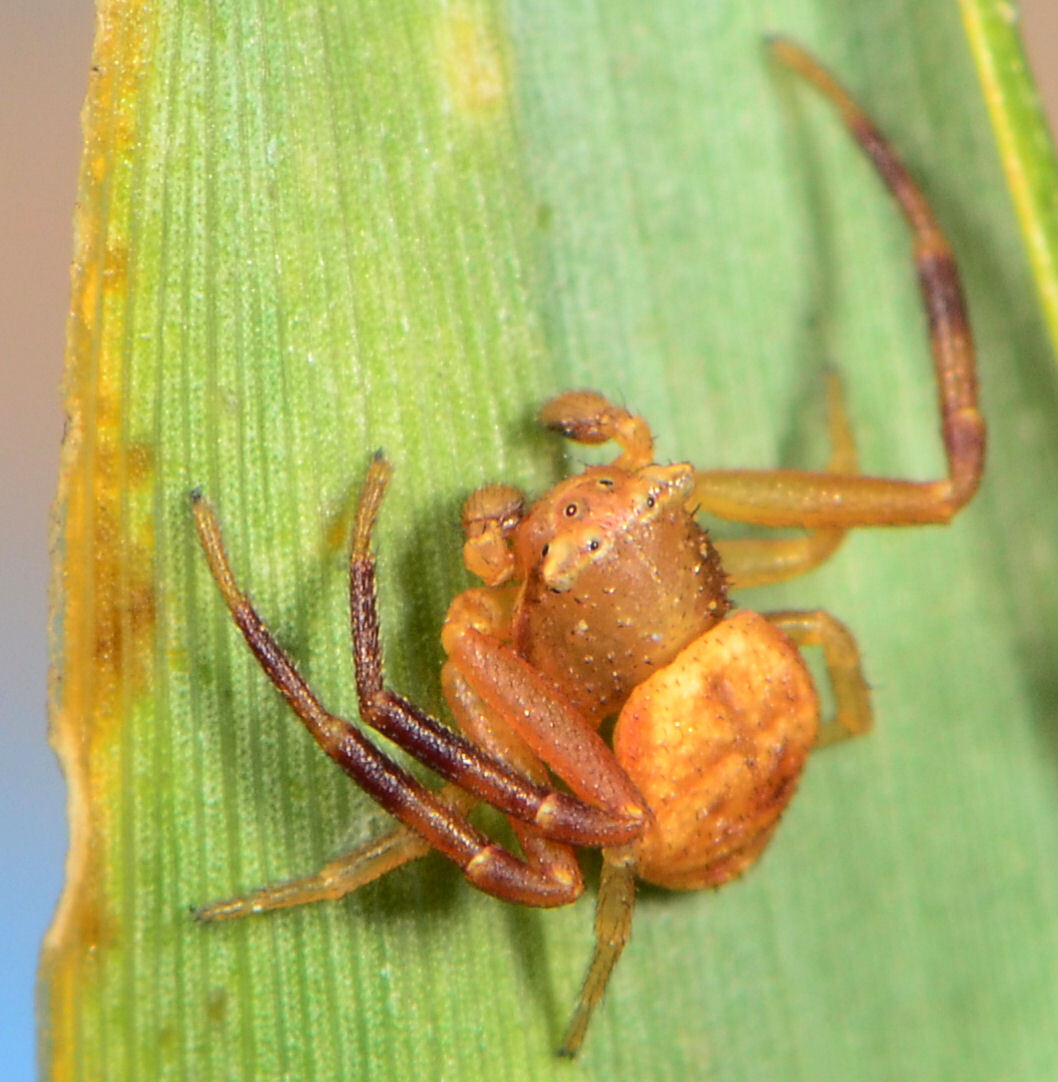
- male

Scientific classification
- Kingdom: Animalia
- Phylum: Arthropoda
- Subphylum: Chelicerata
- Class: Arachnida
- Order: Araneae
- Infraorder: Araneomorphae
- Family: Thomisidae
- Genus: Thomisus
- Species: T. australis

Binomial name
- Thomisus australis Comellini, 1957

Synonyms
- Thomisus mossambicus Comellini, 1957; Thomisus mossambicus weidneri Comellini, 1957; Thomisus drakensbergensis Comellini, 1959

= Thomisus australis =

African Thomisus crab spider

Species of crab spider

Thomisus australis is a species of crab spider in the family Thomisidae. It is endemic to southern and eastern Africa.

== Etymology ==
The species name is from Latin australis meaning "southern".

== Taxonomy ==
Thomisus australis was first described by Comellini in 1957 from Champagne Castle in KwaZulu-Natal, South Africa. The species was later revised by Dippenaar-Schoeman in 1983, who synonymized three other species with T. australis: Thomisus mossambicus Comellini, 1957, T. mossambicus weidneri Comellini, 1957, and T. drakensbergensis Comellini, 1959.

== Distribution ==
Thomisus australis has been recorded from seven African countries: Burundi, Democratic Republic of the Congo, Malawi, Mozambique, Tanzania, Lesotho, and South Africa. In South Africa, the species occurs in eight provinces and has been found in more than 10 protected areas.

The species has been recorded from numerous localities across South Africa, including the Eastern Cape, Free State, Gauteng, KwaZulu-Natal, Limpopo, Mpumalanga, Northern Cape, and Western Cape provinces. Notable protected areas where the species occurs include Kruger National Park, Golden Gate Highlands National Park, Addo Elephant National Park, and Royal Natal National Park.

== Habitat ==
Thomisus australis is a free-living species found on plants, primarily sampled from grass and herb layers. The species has been recorded from all South African floral biomes except the Desert, Succulent Karoo, and Indian Ocean Coastal Belt biomes. It has also been found in agricultural areas, including peach orchards, pine plantations, and tomato crops.

== Description ==
=== Female ===
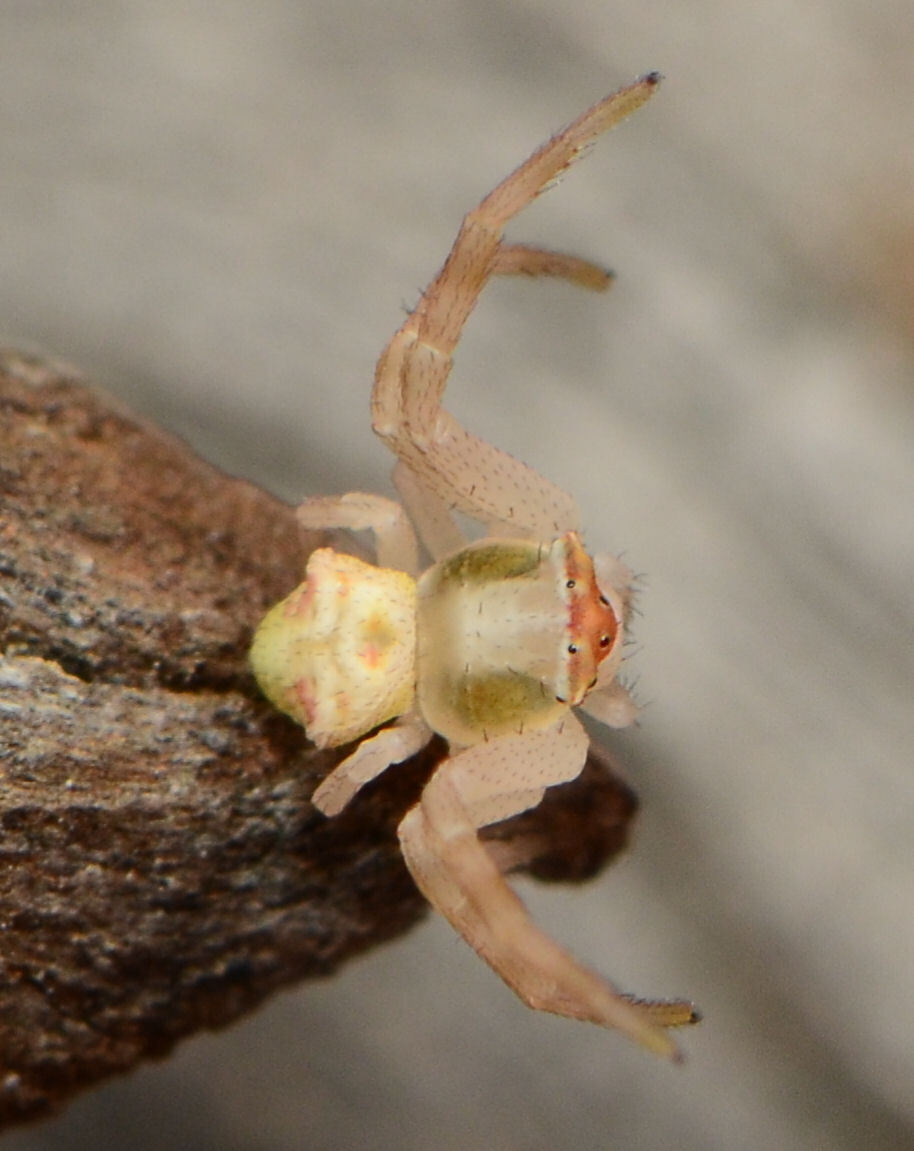
female

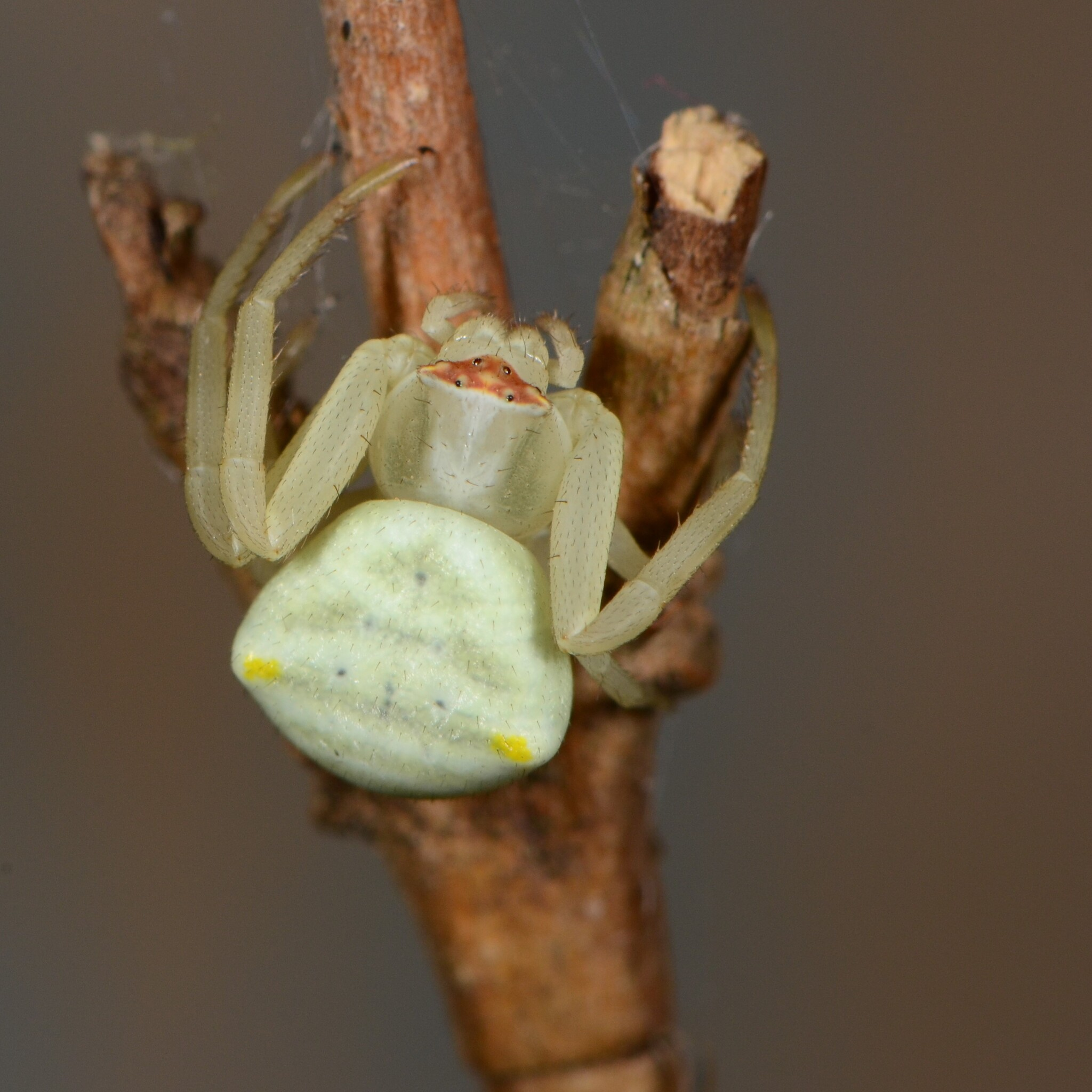
female

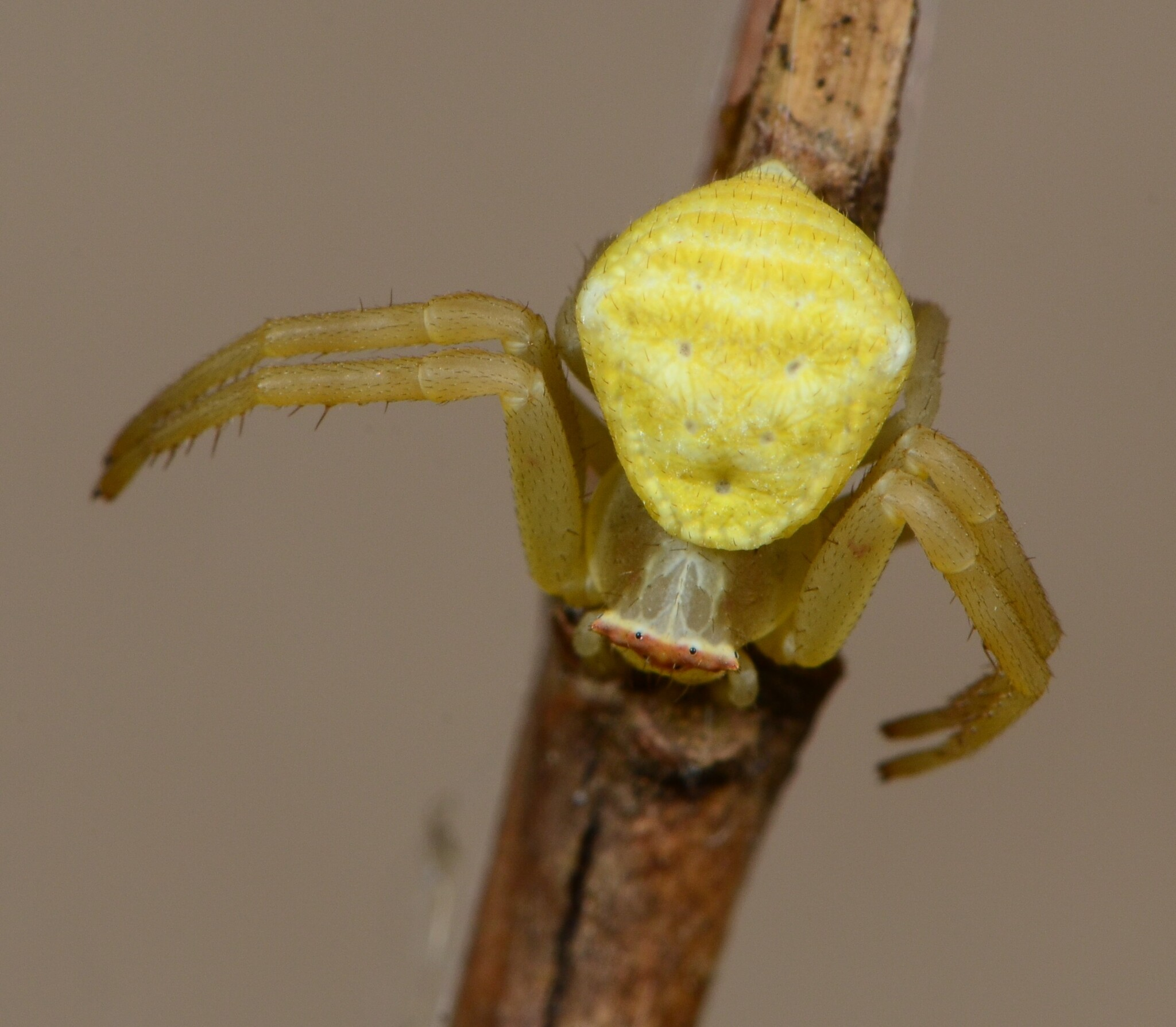
female

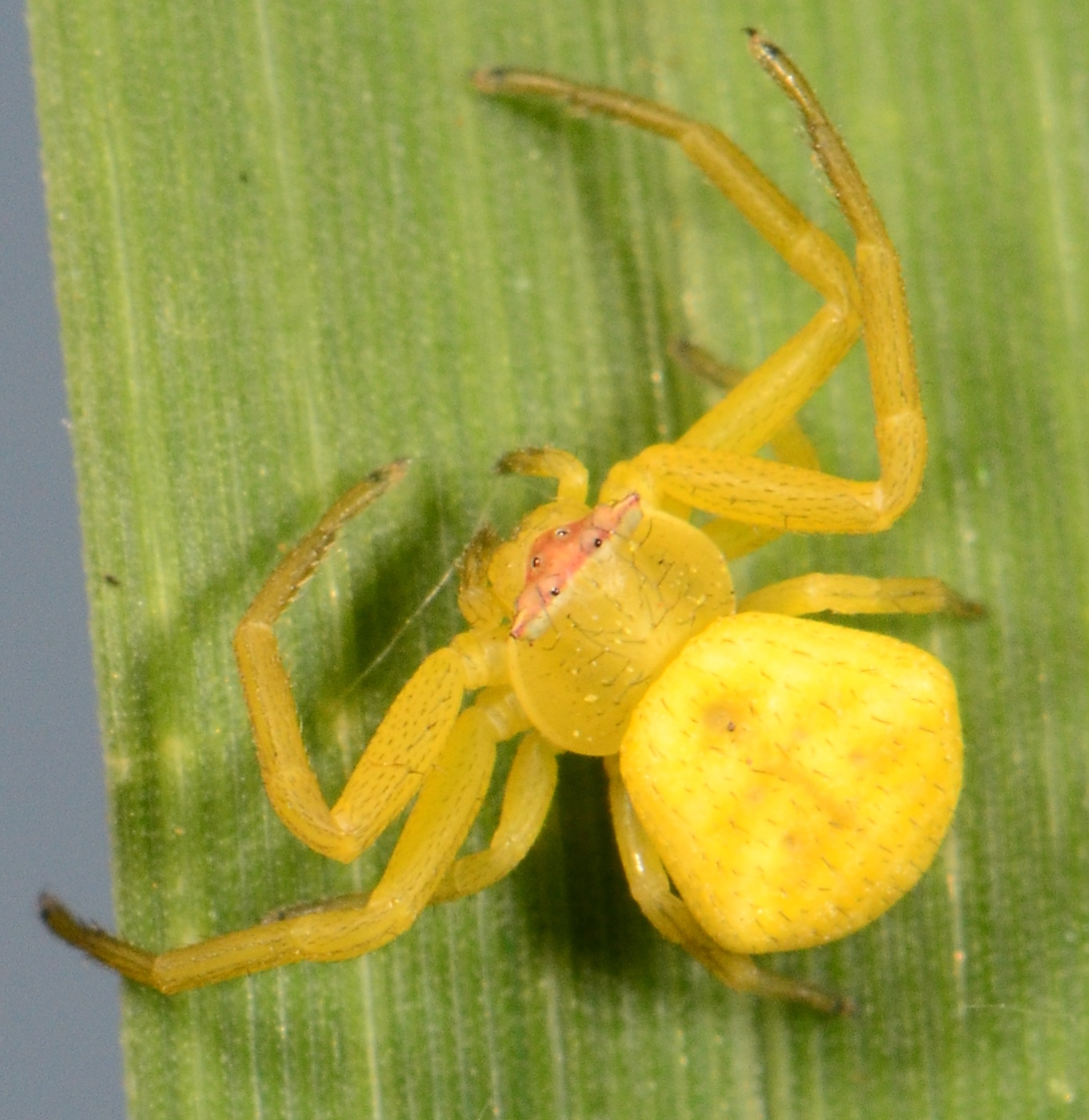
juvenile female

The female T. australis has a total length of 6.5 mm and a cephalothorax length of 2.6 mm. The colour of the carapace is brownish white, with a brown triangular pattern between the anterior eyes as viewed from the front. The opisthosoma is yellow with dorsolateral sides of front legs reddish and white tarsi of front legs reddish brown.

The carapace is as wide as long, with the cephalic region slightly elevated and eye tubercle blunt. The anterior eye row is recurved while the posterior row is almost straight, with anterior eyes being the same size and slightly larger than posterior eyes. The opisthosoma is bell-shaped with tubercles of moderate length.

=== Male ===
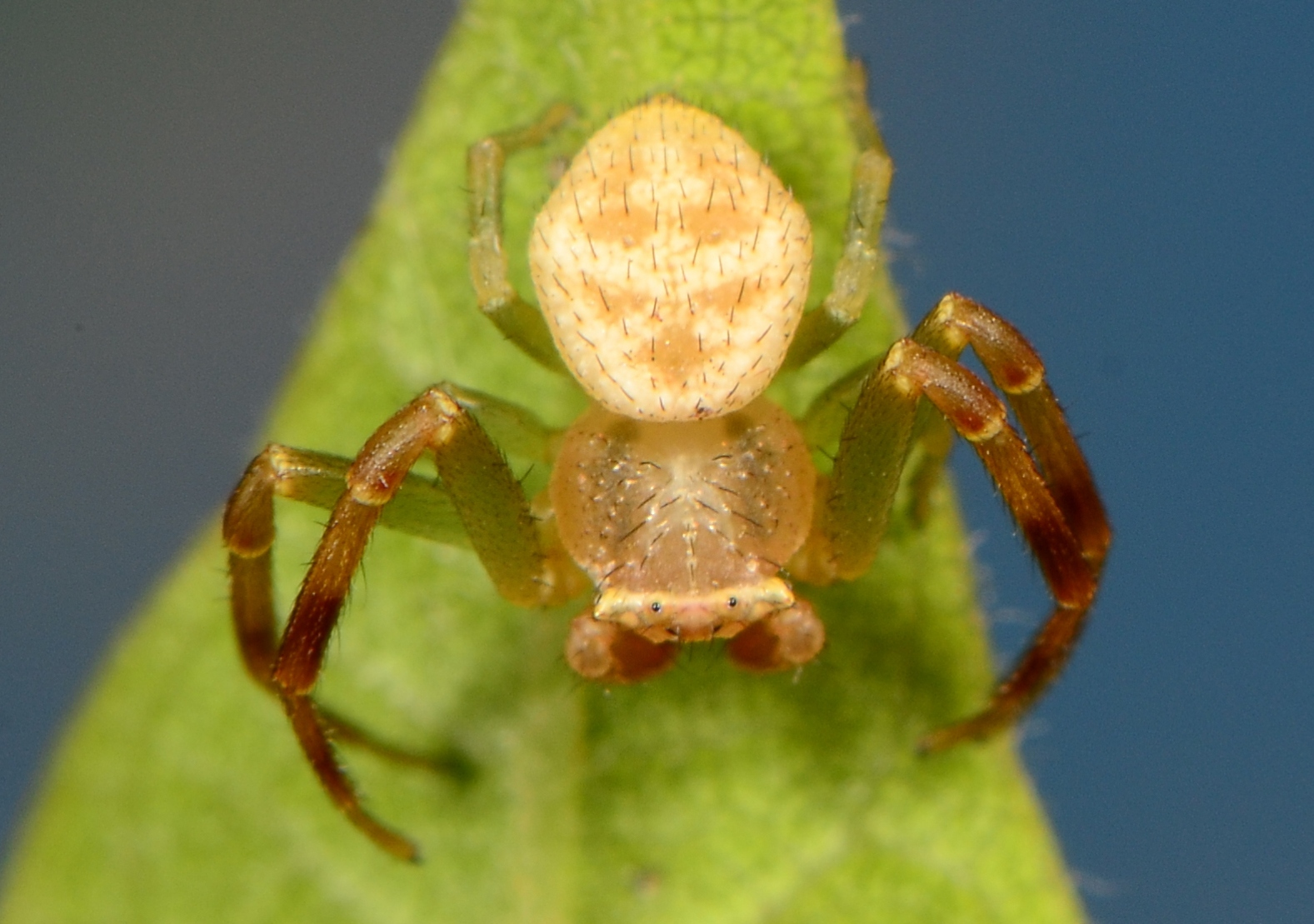
male

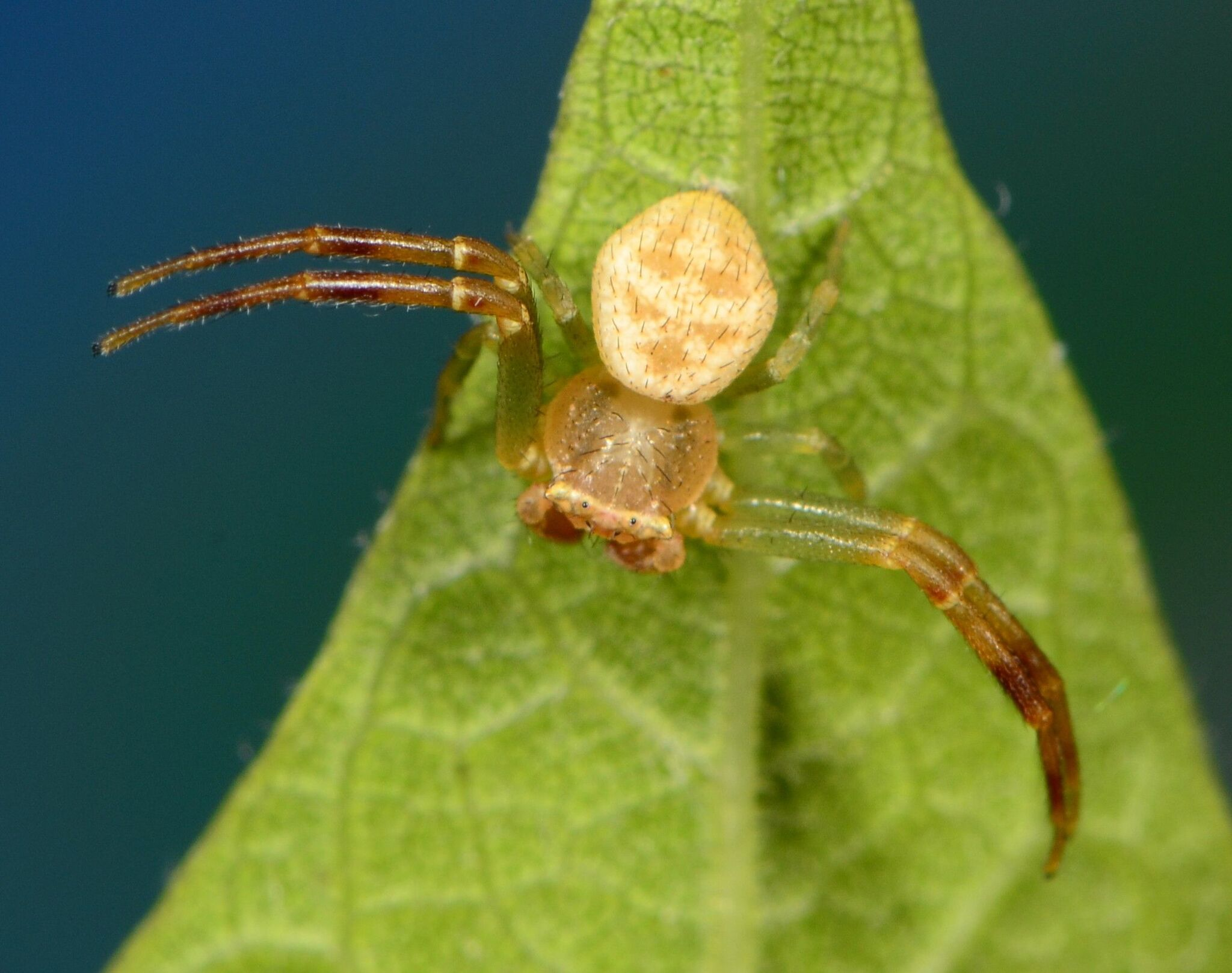
male

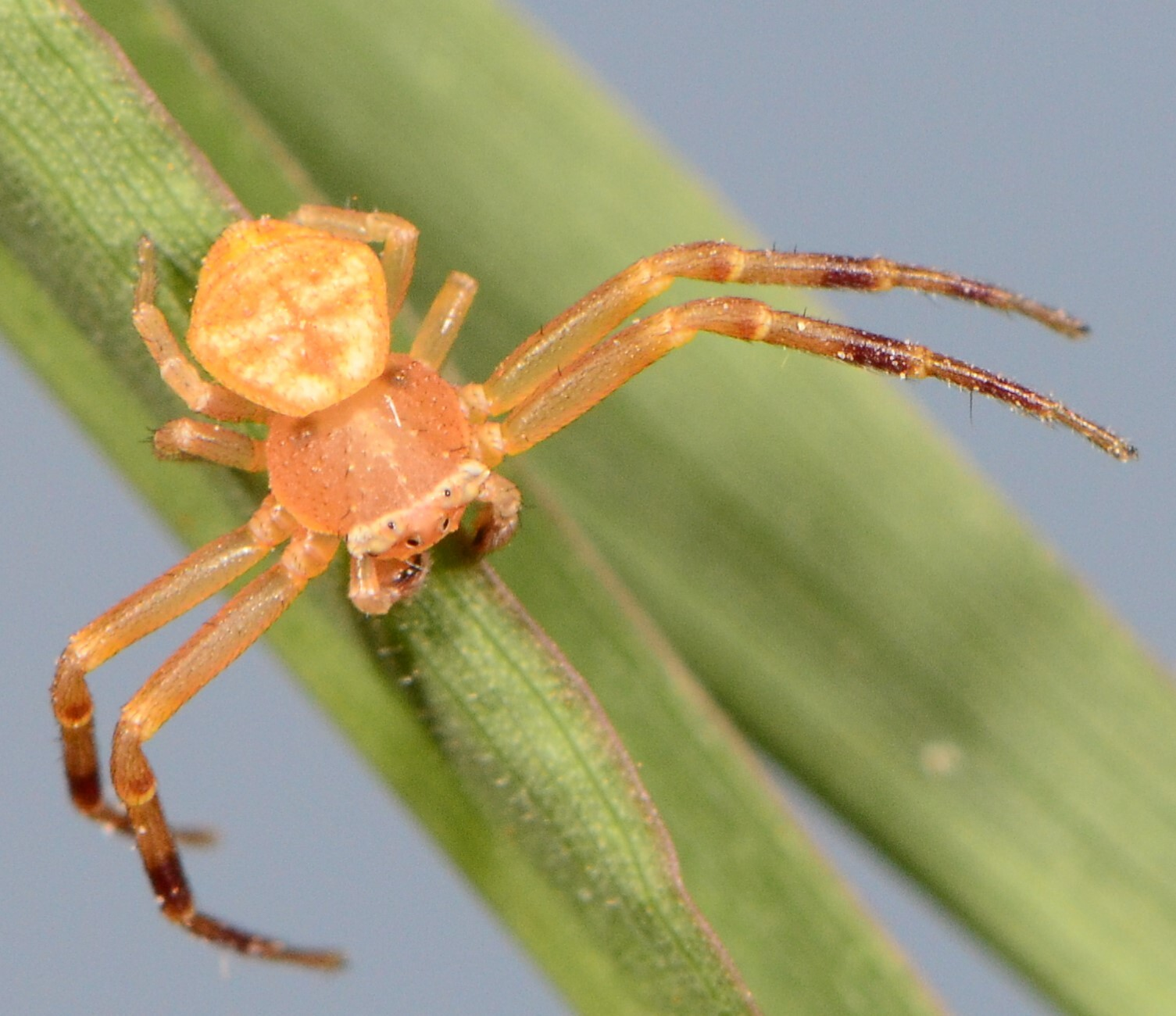
male

Males are smaller than females, with a total length of 3.0 mm and cephalothorax length of 1.4 mm. The carapace and opisthosoma are more flattened than in females, and the opisthosoma is ovate and clothed with numerous dark spiniform setae dorsally with a few faint white markings on the integument. The pedipalps have an embolus that is short and thick with a retrolateral tibial apophysis that is long.

== Life cycle ==
Females of T. australis have been collected from December to April, while males have been found from November to May. The species is mainly collected from grass and flowers during these periods.

== Conservation status ==
Due to its wide geographical range across multiple African countries and its presence in numerous protected areas, Thomisus australis is considered to be of Least Concern from a conservation perspective. No specific threats to the species have been identified.
