= Popple Peak =

Mountain in South Africa

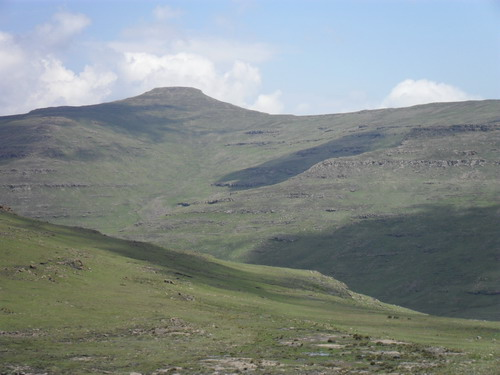
- Popple Peak seen from the top of Bannerman Pass

Highest point
- Elevation: 3,331 m (10,928 ft)
- Listing: List of mountains in South Africa
- Coordinates: 29°14′0″S 29°24′0″E

Geography
- Location within South Africa
- Location: KwaZulu-Natal
- Parent range: Drakensberg

Climbing
- First ascent: 1946 or earlier

Popple Peak (Afrikaans: Popplepiek) is a mountain in the Drakensberg range, South Africa. It is located on the border between South Africa and Lesotho, on the watershed that forms the border between the two countries. Popple peak is 3331 m above sea level and has an elevation of approximately 300 metres from the surrounding escarpment. It is the 13th highest peak in South Africa and it is visible from as far away as Estcourt and Ladysmith in the KwaZulu-Natal Midlands.

This peak is considered a Khulu, a peak above 3000 metres and not within 1 km of another Khulu, as defined by the Mountain Club of South Africa.

The peak was named by Barry Anderson in 1946 after John Poppleton (who climbed the peak with Barry Anderson and Des Watkins). On arrival at the summit a thunderstorm came up, and Poppleton was concerned for his safety, causing him to leave the summit. Anderson later sent the survey of the peak to the Surveyor General with the height and name "Popple Peak".
