= Njesuthi =

Mountain in Lesotho and South Africa

- Location within South Africa Location within Lesotho

Highest point
- Elevation: 3,408 m (11,181 ft)
- Listing: List of mountains in South Africa
- Coordinates: 29°12′S 29°22′E

Geography
- Location: KwaZulu Natal, South Africa
- Parent range: Drakensberg

Njesuthi or Injesuthi Dome is the fourth highest mountain in the Drakensberg mountain range at 3,408 metres (11,181 ft), and second highest peak in South Africa. It is located on the border between Lesotho and the South African province KwaZulu-Natal. Also, less than 1.5 km away on the border is the taller Mafadi peak at 3,450 metres (11,319 ft).

== See also ==
- List of mountains in South Africa
