= Monk's Cowl =

Mountain in KwaZulu-Natal, South Africa

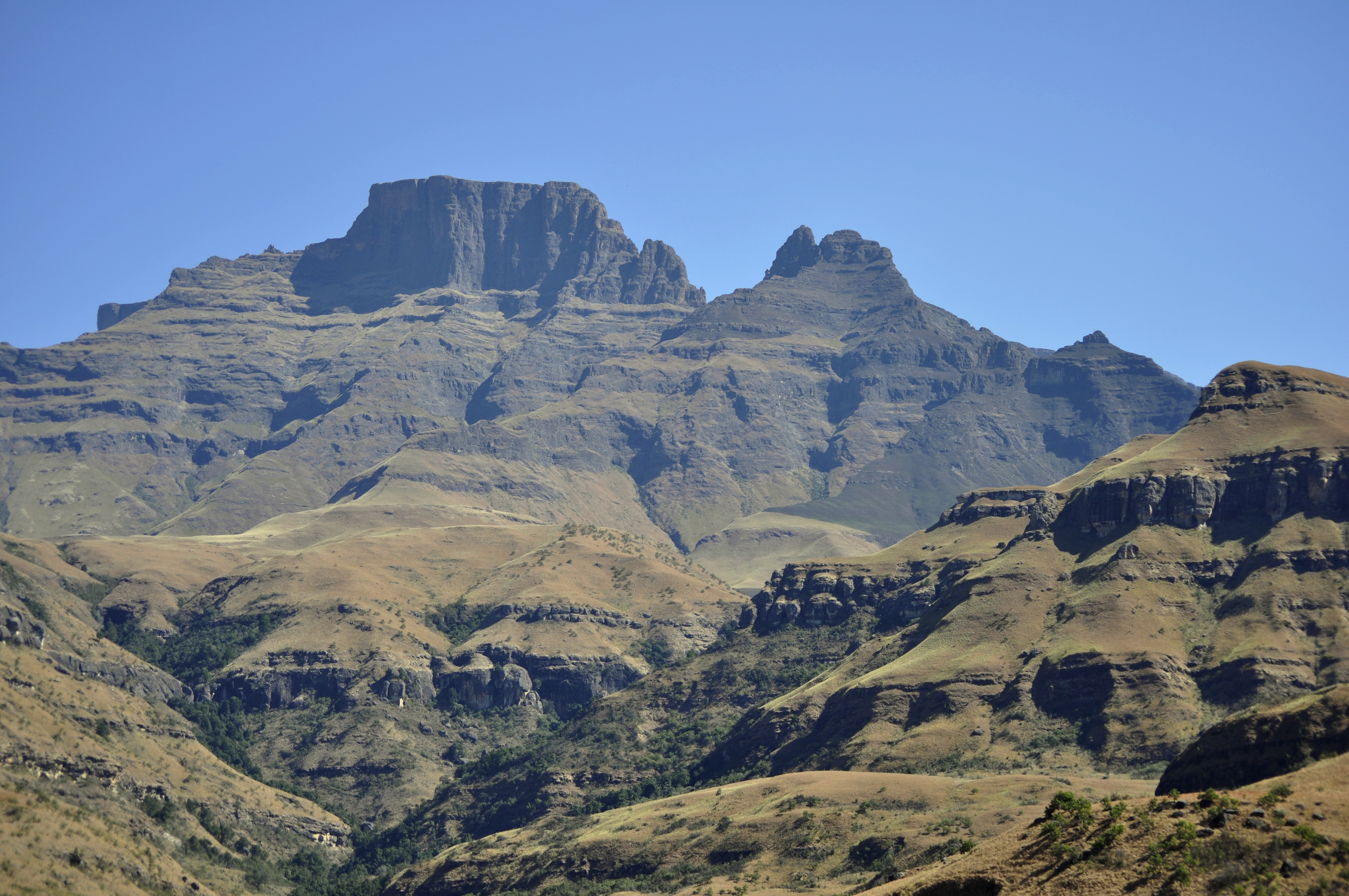

Highest point
- Elevation: 3,229 m (10,594 ft)
- Coordinates: 29°4′46.5″S 29°20′34.7″E

Geography
- Location: KwaZulu-Natal, South Africa
- Parent range: Drakensberg

Geology
- Mountain type: Basalt

Monk's Cowl is a mountain in the Drakensberg in KwaZulu-Natal. It is part of the Drakensberg Escarpment that forms the border between South Africa and Lesotho. Monk's Cowl is the third highest peak in the northern part of the range, after Mont-aux-Sources, which is approximately 38 metres higher. It is the highest free-standing peak and climbers require rock climbing equipment to reach the peak.

There is a tarred road, the R600, which leads from Winterton through Cathkin Park past Champagne Castle to the Monks Cowl campsite and Monks Cowl Cottage, slightly lower down in the valley.
