= Mafadi =

Peak on the border of South Africa and Lesotho

Maifadi
- Location within South Africa Location within Lesotho

Highest point
- Elevation: 3,446.1 m (11,306 ft)
- Listing: Country high point List of mountains in South Africa
- Coordinates: 29°12′08.4″S 29°21′25.5″E

Geography
- Location: South Africa and Lesotho
- Parent range: Drakensberg

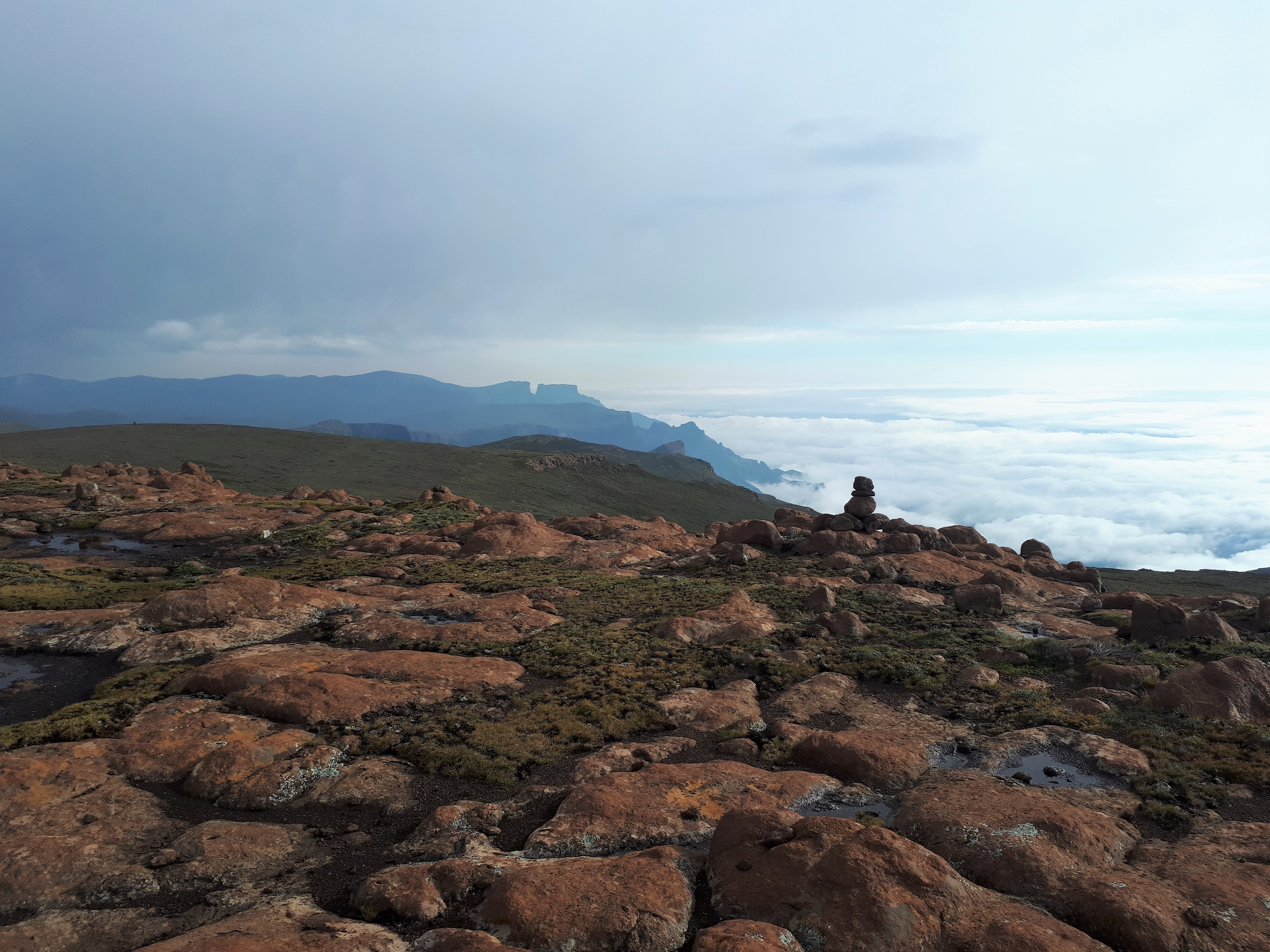
Maifadi mountain top. A morning thunderstorm approaches from the North West. Champagne's Castle (South Africa's third highest mountain at 3377m) visible on the horizon. Also the prominent Cathkin Peak in the center of the photo. Below the escarpment, clouds cover the valleys of the lower Drakensberg (South Africa).

Maifadi is a peak on the border of South Africa and Lesotho. At a height of 3,446.1 metres (11,306 ft), it is the highest mountain in the nation of South Africa, but is lower than Thabana Ntlenyana, the highest peak in Lesotho which is, at 3,482 metres (11,424 ft), the highest point in Southern Africa.

By the Himalayan definition of a mountain, being a summit with at least 7% topographic prominence relative to height, Maifadi is not in fact a mountain summit, but rather a subsidiary summit of Makheka in Lesotho. By this definition, Champagne Castle is the highest mountain summit in South Africa, although Maifadi is unquestionably the highest point in South Africa.

== Ascent ==
=== Hiking ===
Ascents of Maifadi, attempted from the South African side, are normally made from the Njesuthi campsite. The Njesuthi escarpment of the Drakensberg is one of the more remote hiking regions, and normally takes two days to reach the escarpment. The route involves about an 8 kilometres (5.0 mi) hike to Marble Baths. This is followed by continuing up the river and with a combination of short paths and boulder hopping. This all ends at the bottom of the ridge, which leads to the Molar, with a campsite. The subsequent path up the ridge to the top of the mountains is known as Leslie's Pass. The path follows the ridge until below a rocky band where it traverses to southern side. The way continues up a short scree section, followed by more hiking up a quite steep gradient, until the final 20 metres (66 ft) are made up a grassy slope. From here, the top of Leslie's Pass (Note: Leslie's Pass 29°09′12.7″S 29°20′38.0″E) follows, and a spectacular hike up the ridge connecting Lithobolong and Maifadi.

A route referred to as the Corner-Leslies Loop is becoming a popular way of reaching Maifadi. It entails hiking to Centenary Hut in Injisuthi Nature Reserve on day 1, ascending Corner Pass and climbing Maifadi on day 2, descending Leslie's Pass to Marble Baths on day 3, and returning to the Njesuthi campsite on day.

=== Running ===
On 8 October 2015, South African trail runners Ryan Sandes and Ryno Griesel set a Fastest Known Time (FKT) for the ascent of Mafadi via the Northern High Approach, an alternative, and slightly shorter but steeper route of the popular Corner's pass. They set a time of 5h 47.59 min, starting and ending at the Njesuthi campsite, and covered a total of 38.52 kilometres (23.94 mi) with approximately 2,400 metres (7,900 ft) of elevation gain/loss. The previous FKT was set in 2012 by fellow South African, Andrew Porter, with a time of 6 h 22 min from the Giant's Castle campsite via Judge pass.

== Disputed name ==
The name of Maifadi (which literally means the Mother of Fadi) is currently under dispute, its original Sotho name Ntheledi (which means "Makes me slip", referring to the nearby stream) being considered by some to be more relevant and correct.

== See also ==
- List of mountains in South Africa
