= Thaba Putsoa =

- Northwestern flank of Thaba Putsoa Range

Highest point
- Elevation: 3,096 m (10,157 ft)
- Coordinates: 29°43′53″S 27°55′34″E

Geography
- Location within Lesotho
- Location: Maseru District, Lesotho
- Parent range: Drakensberg

Thaba Putsoa (Blue Mountain) is a mountain in the Maseru District of Lesotho. It lies along the road to the Mohale Dam, approximately 70 kilometres to the southeast of the capital Maseru. The mountain attains a height of 3,096 metres.

Thaba Putsoa has some of the coolest temperatures in Lesotho.

On 13 April 2017, a Eurocopter EC135 T2+ crashed on 13 April 2017 in the area of Thaba Putsoa, killing all four people on board. The helicopter was carrying three soldiers and an official from the Ministry of Finance who was delivering pensions to outlying districts. Officials reported it hit power lines and crashed in mountainous terrain near Thaba Putsoa, killing two of the soldiers and critically injuring the other two passengers, both of whom later died in hospital from their injuries.
