= Offshoot (plant) =

Lateral growth branching from plant stem

Offshoots are lateral shoots that are produced on the main stem of a plant and are an asexual form of reproduction which means that they don’t need any form of pollination to grow. They may be known colloquially as "suckers", "pups" or "sister plants". Many houseplants produce offshoots, especially succulents, and they can be separated from the parent or main plant to grow new, independent, plants.

== See also ==
- Stolon, offsets or runners
