= Cathedral Peak (South Africa) =

Mountain in Drakensberg, South Africa

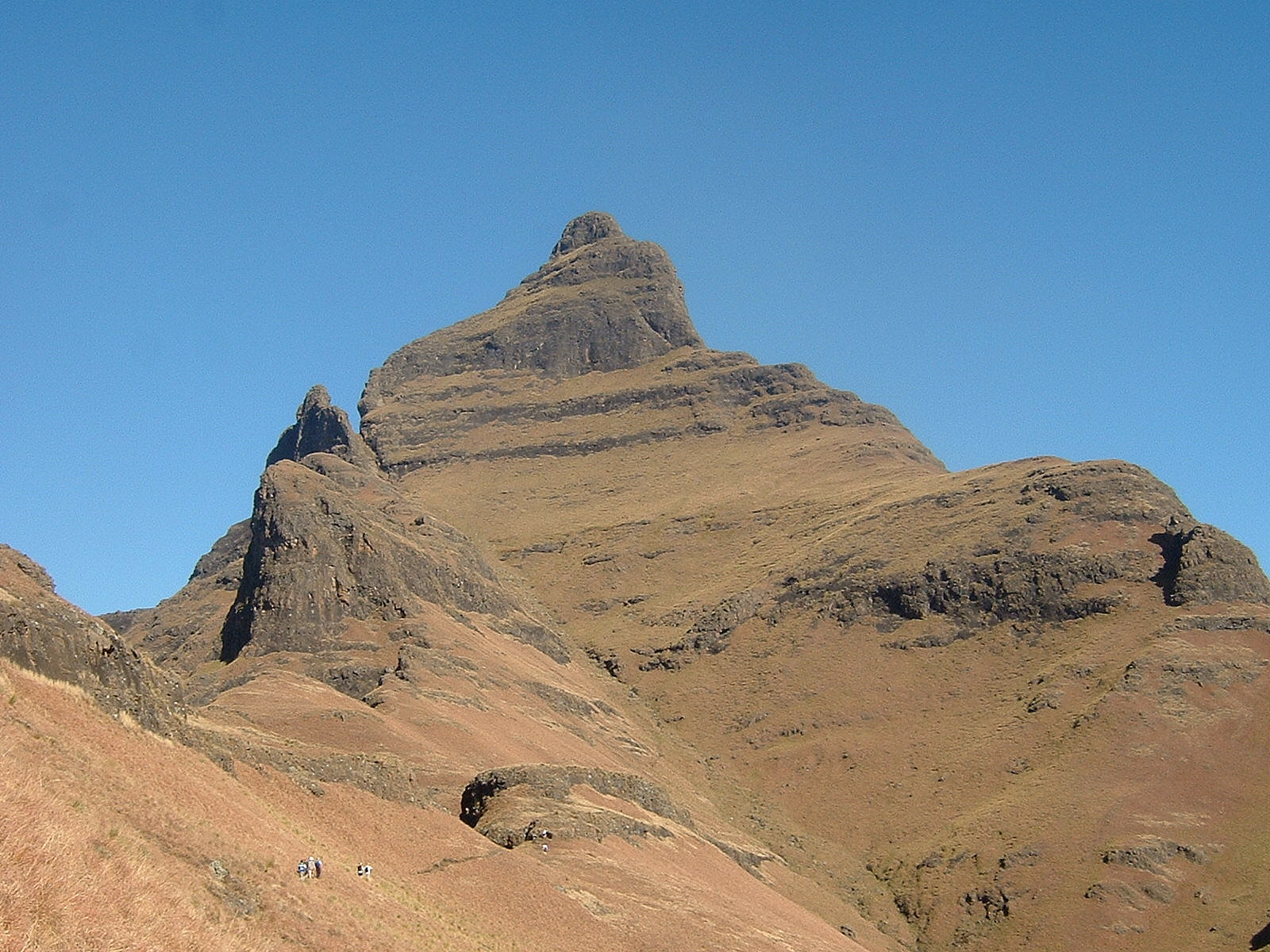
- Cathedral Peak during the winter dry season

Highest point
- Elevation: 3,004 m (9,856 ft)
- Listing: List of mountains in South Africa
- Coordinates: 28°55′24″S 29°8′2″E

Geography
- Location within South Africa
- Location: KwaZulu-Natal, South Africa
- Parent range: Drakensberg

Geology
- Mountain type: Basalt

Climbing
- First ascent: 1917 by D.W. Basset-Smith and R.G. Kingdon
- Easiest route: One day hike

Cathedral Peak (Afrikaans: Cathedralpiek) is a mountain in KwaZulu-Natal, South Africa. It is a 3,004 m (9,856 ft) high free standing mountain in the Drakensberg. The mountain is also known as Mponjwana (Little Horn) by the local Amangwane people.

Cathedral Peak is part of the Cathedral Ridge which is at right angles to the main range. Other peaks in the spur are the Twins, also known as the Triplets, (2,899 m or 9,510 feet), the Bell (2,930 m or 9,800 feet), the Outer (3,006 m or 9,860 feet) and Inner (3,005 m or 9,858 feet) Horns, the Chessmen (2,987 m or 9,800 feet) and Mitre Peak (3,023 m or 9,919 feet).

Cathedral Peak was first climbed by D.W. Basset-Smith and R.G. Kingdon in 1917, via the gully.

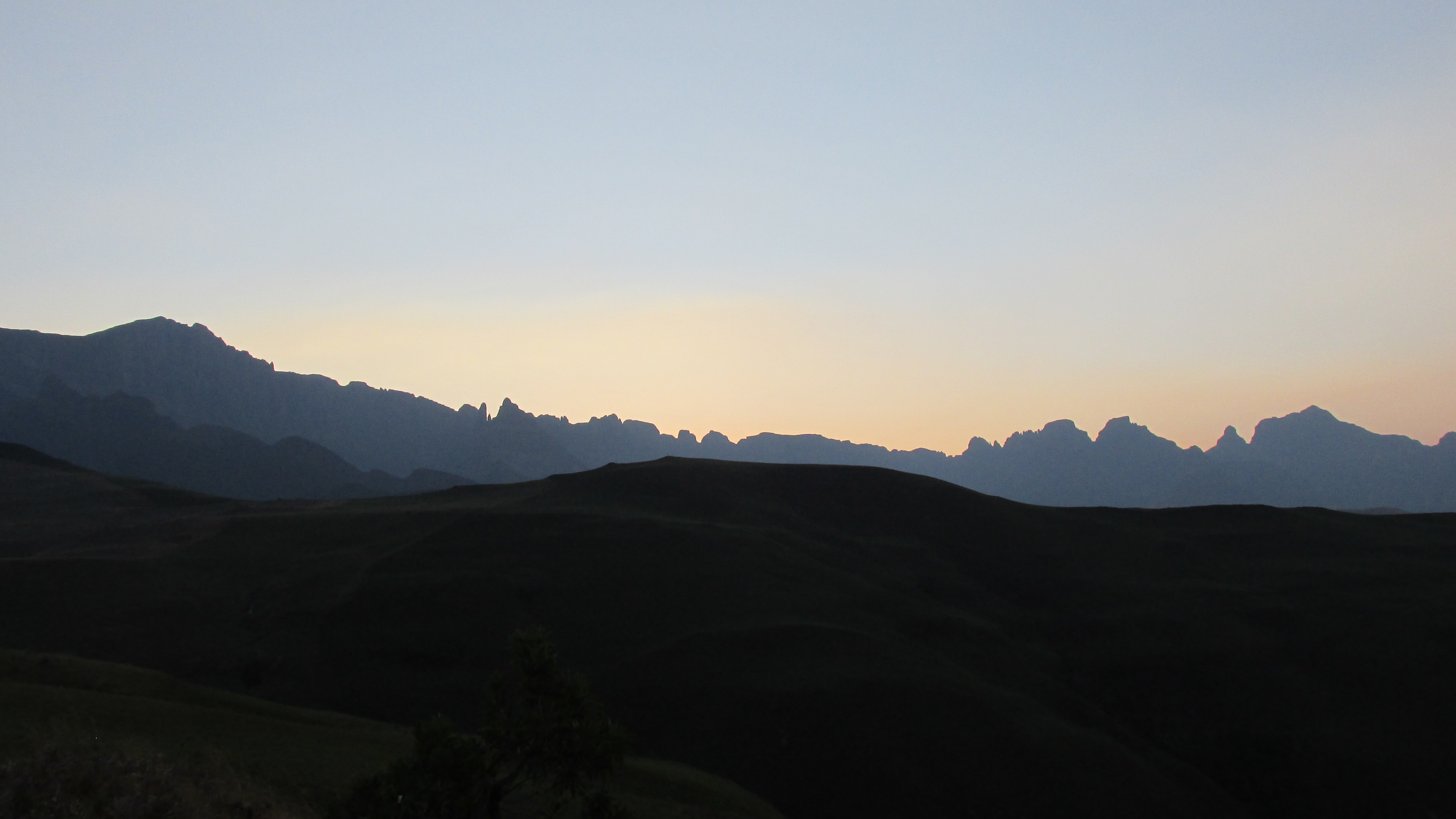
Sunset over the Cathedral Range
