= Champagne Castle =

Mountain in KwaZulu-Natal, South Africa

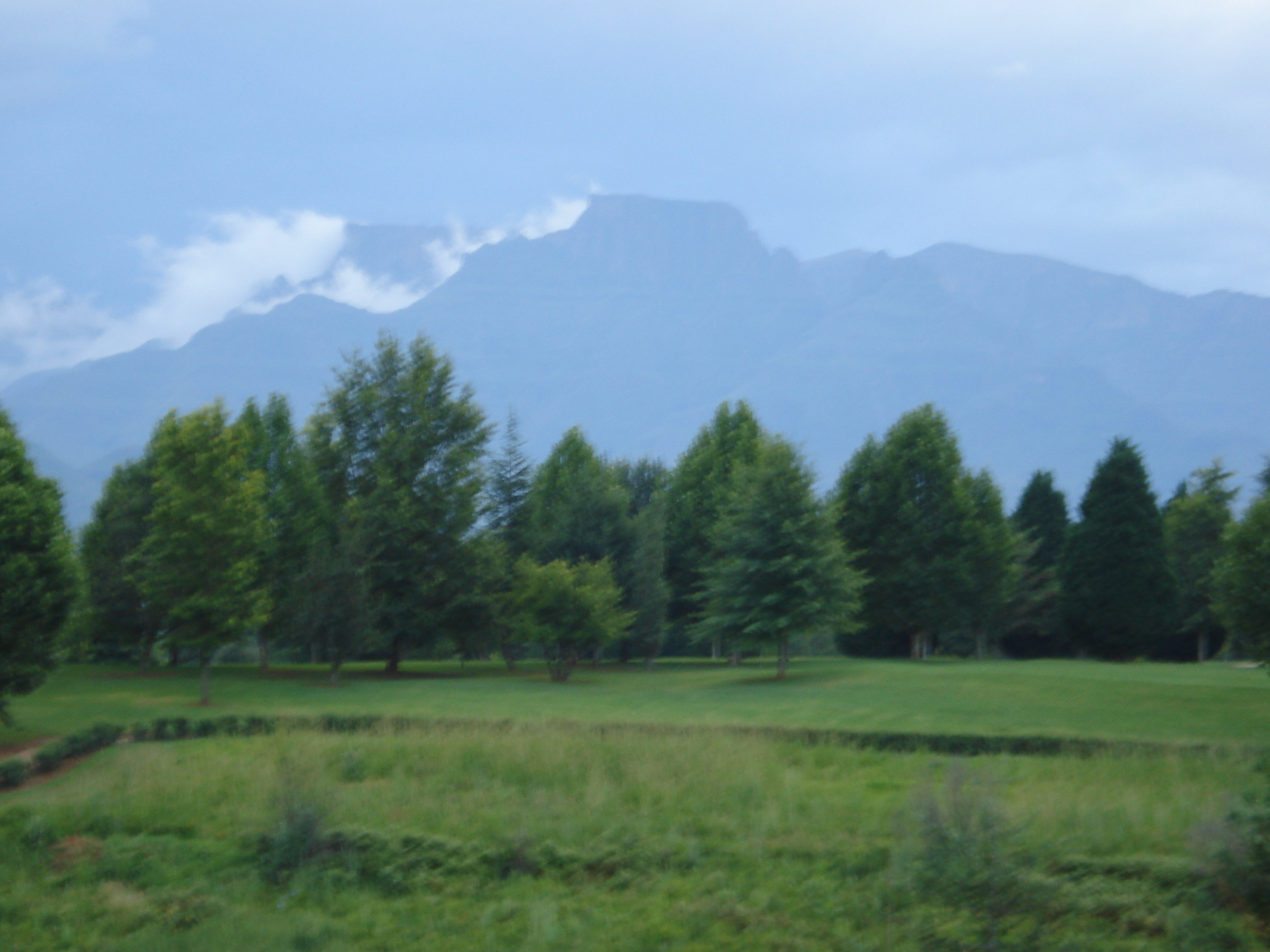
- A photo of Cathkin Peak in the foreground, and Champagne Castle on the left, enveloped in clouds in the background.

Highest point
- Elevation: 3,377 m (11,079 ft)
- Coordinates: 29°05′S 29°19′E

Geography
- Location: KwaZulu-Natal, South Africa
- Parent range: Drakensberg

Geology
- Mountain type: Basalt

Climbing
- First ascent: Early 20th century by Reverend Stocker
- Easiest route: Scramble up Grey's Pass

Champagne Castle is a mountain in the central Drakensberg range, and is the third highest peak in South Africa. It contains a series of subsidiary peaks, amongst them, Cathkin Peak (3149 m), Sterkhorn (previously called Mount Memory), Monk's Cowl and Dragon's Back.

It is said that when two intrepid mountaineers, David Gray and Major Grantham, climbed the peaks directly in front of Cathkin, they were about to celebrate their long haul by popping a bottle of champagne. But as fate would have it, the guide dropped the bottle on a rock – and in that moment Champagne Castle in the heart of the Drakensberg was christened.

Cathkin Peak was named after the residence of a Lanarkshire immigrant, Stephan Snyman, who named his home after Cathkin Braes, a hill in Glasgow.

As is the common trend in the Drakensberg, surrounding hotels and resorts have been named after Champagne Castle, Monk's Cowl and Cathkin Peak.

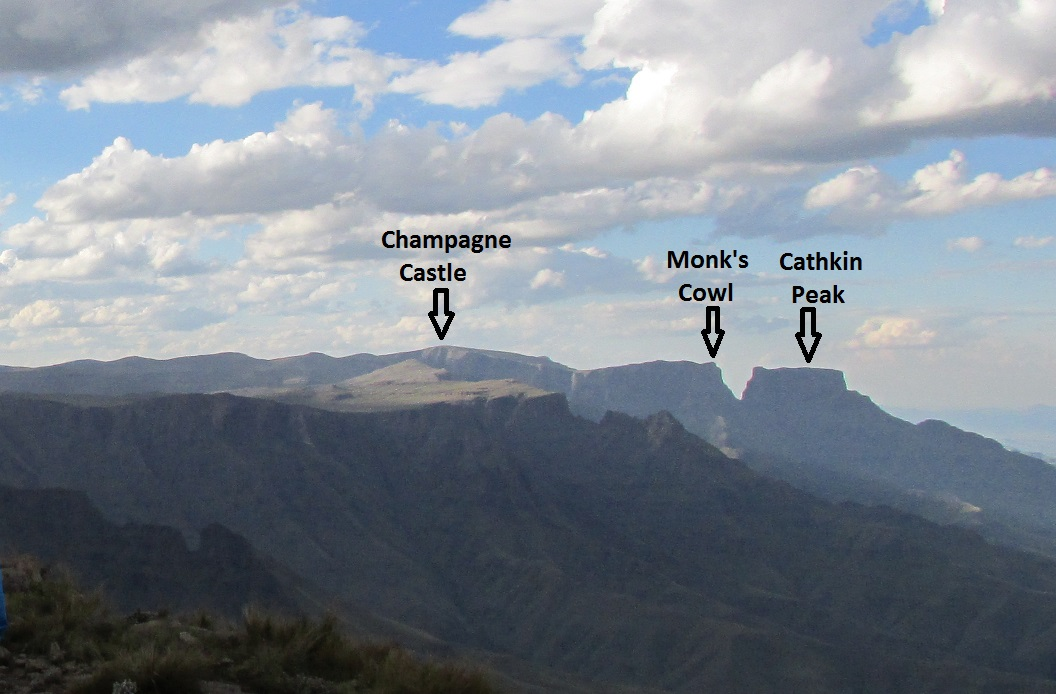
The Champagne Range from the south

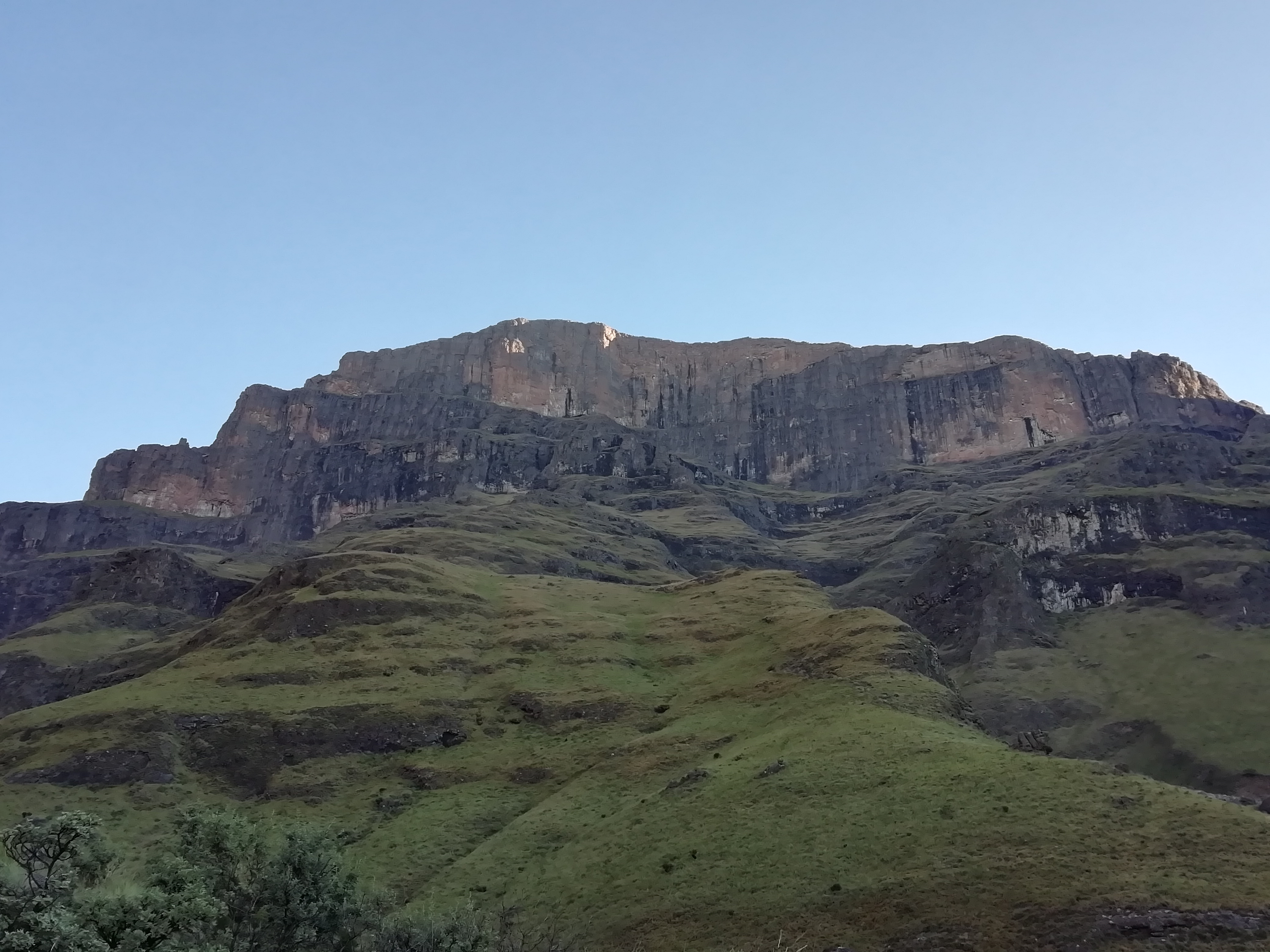
Champagne Castle from below as seen from Keith Bush Camp
