= Drakensberg =

Mountain range in South Africa

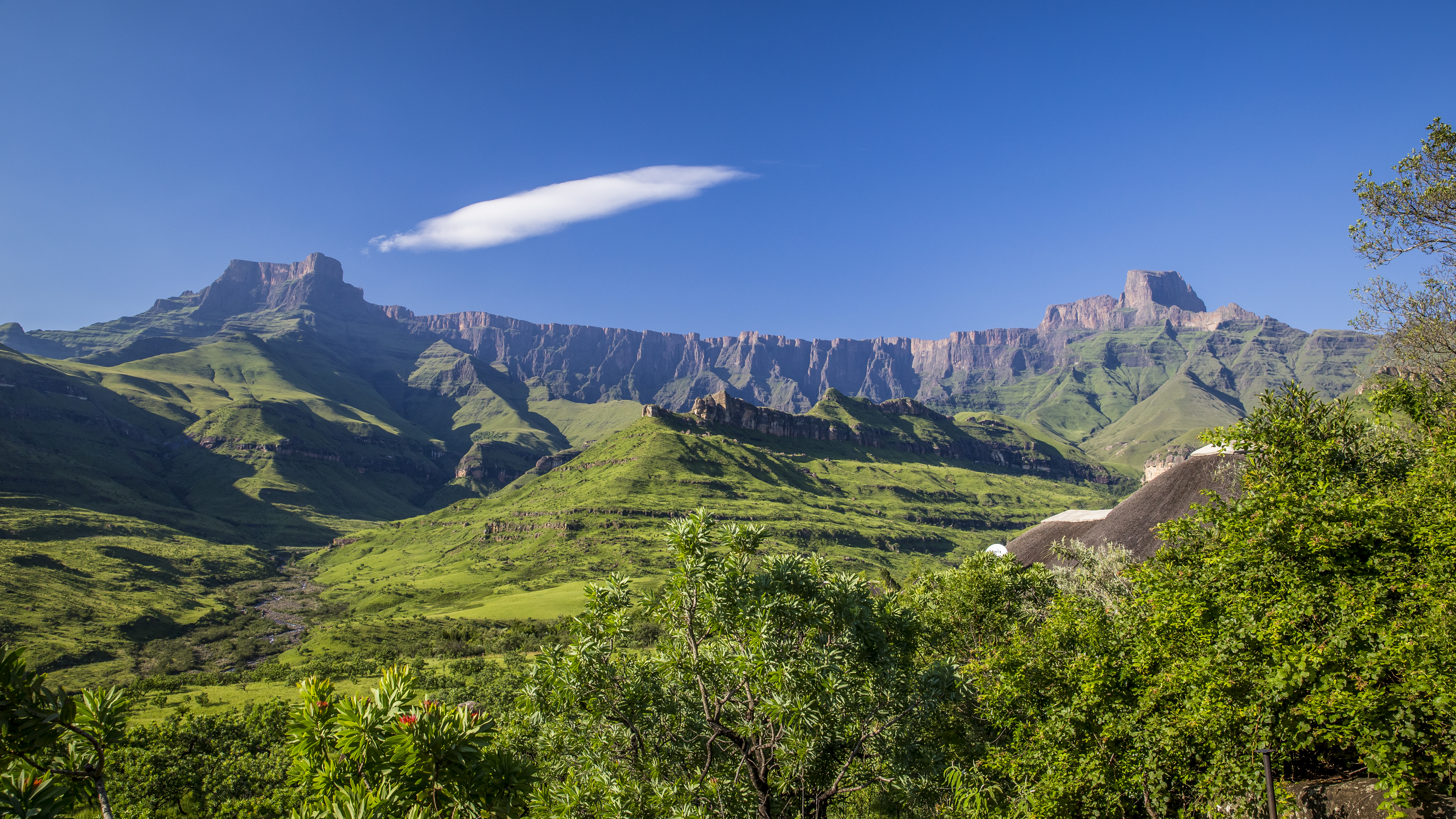
- View of the Amphitheatre at the Royal Natal National Park

Highest point
- Peak: Thabana Ntlenyana
- Elevation: 3,482 m (11,424 ft)
- Coordinates: 29°23′S 29°27′E

Dimensions
- Length: 1,000 km (620 mi) SW to NE

Naming
- Etymology: Dragon's Mountain
- Native name: Maloti (Sotho); uKhahlamba (Zulu)

Geography
- Countries: South Africa; Lesotho

Geology
- Rock types: Basalt; Quartzite

The Drakensberg (Zulu: uKhahlamba; Sotho: Maloti; Afrikaans: Drakensberge) is the eastern portion of the Great Escarpment, which encloses the central Southern African plateau. The Great Escarpment reaches its greatest elevation – 2,000 to 3,482 metres (6,562 to 11,424 feet) within the border region of South Africa and Lesotho.

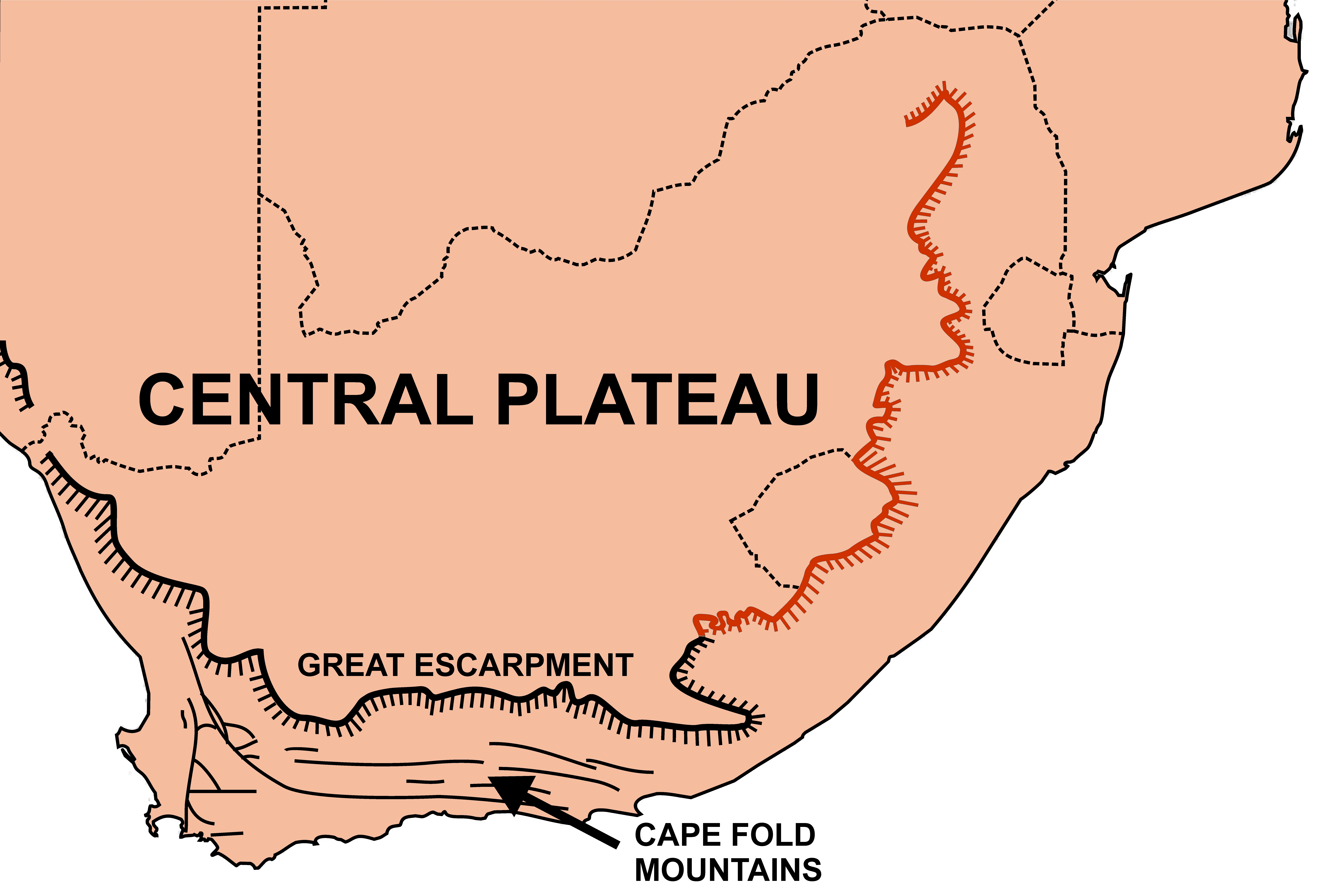
A map of South Africa shows the central plateau edged by the Great Escarpment and its relationship to the Cape Fold Mountains to the south. The portion of the Great Escarpment shown in red is known as the Drakensberg.

The Drakensberg escarpment stretches for more than 1,000 kilometres (600 miles) from the Eastern Cape Province in the South (starting at the Baziya mountains and just outside Tsolo), then successively forms, in order from south to north, the border between Lesotho and the Eastern Cape and the border between Lesotho and KwaZulu-Natal Province. Thereafter it forms the border between KwaZulu-Natal and the Free State, and next as the border between KwaZulu-Natal and Mpumalanga Province. The escarpment winds north from there, through Mpumalanga, where it includes features such as the Blyde River Canyon, Three Rondavels, and God's Window. It then extends farther north to Hoedspruit in southeastern Limpopo where it is known as 'Klein Drakensberg' by the Afrikaner. From Hoedspruit it extends west to Tzaneen, also in Limpopo Province, where it is known as the Wolkberg Mountains and Iron Crown Mountain. At 2,200 m (7,200 ft) above sea level, the Wolkberg is the highest elevation in Limpopo. The escarpment extends west again and at Mokopane it is known as the Strydpoort Mountains.

== Etymology ==
The Afrikaans name Drakensberge comes from the name the earliest Dutch settlers gave to the escarpment, namely Drakensbergen, or Dragons' Mountains. The highest portion of the Great Escarpment is known in Zulu as uKhahlamba and as Maloti in Sotho ("Barrier of up-pointed spears").

== Geology ==
=== Origins ===
The Great Escarpment is composed of steep rift valley walls formed around a bulging of continental crust during the breakup of southern Gondwana that have since eroded inland from their original positions near the southern African coast, and its entire eastern portion (see the accompanying map) constitutes the Drakensberg. The Drakensberg terminate in the north near Tzaneen at about the 22° S parallel. The absence of the Great Escarpment for approximately 450 km (280 mi) to the north of Tzaneen (to reappear on the border between Zimbabwe and Mozambique in the Chimanimani Mountains) is due to a failed westerly branch of the main rift that caused Antarctica to start drifting away from southern Africa during the breakup of Gondwana about 150 million years ago. The lower Limpopo River and Save River drain into the Indian Ocean through what remains of this relict incipient rift valley, which now forms part of the South African Lowveld.

During the past 20 million years, southern Africa has experienced massive uplifting, especially in the east, with the result that most of the plateau lies above 1,000 m (3,300 ft) despite extensive erosion. The plateau is tilted such that it is highest in the east and slopes gently downward toward the west and south. Typically, the elevation of the edge of the eastern escarpments is in excess of 2,000 m (6,600 ft). It reaches its highest point of over 3,000 m (9,800 ft) where the escarpment forms part of the international border between Lesotho and the South African province of KwaZulu-Natal.

=== Appearance ===
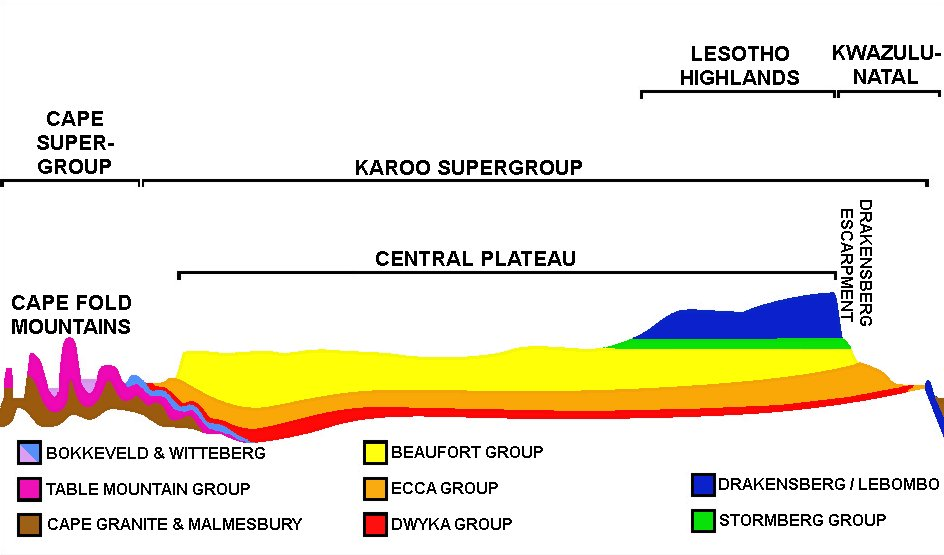
This approximate SW-NE cross section through South Africa with the Cape Peninsula (with Table Mountain) on the far left, and north-eastern KwaZulu-Natal on the right, is diagrammatic and only roughly to scale. It shows how the Drakensberg Escarpment is related to the major geographical features that dominate the southern and eastern parts of the country, particularly the Central Plateau, whose southwestern edge (in the diagram) is called the Roggeberg escarpment (not labelled). The major geological layers that shape this geography are indicated in different colors whose significance and origin are explained under the headings "Karoo Supergroup" and "Cape Supergroup". The 1600 m thick layer of hard, erosion-resistant basalt (lava) that accounts for the height and steepness of the Drakensberg Escarpment on the KwaZuluNatal-Lesotho border is indicated in blue. Immediately below it is the Stormberg Group shown in green. The Clarence Formation with its numerous caves and San rock paintings, forms part of this latter group.

The escarpment seen from below resembles a range of mountains. The Limpopo, Mpumalanga, and Lesotho Drakensberg have hard erosion-resistant upper surfaces and therefore have a very rugged appearance, combining steep-sided blocks and pinnacles (giving rise to the Zulu name "Barrier of up-pointed spears"). Who first gave these mountains their Afrikaans or Dutch name Drakensberg, and why, is unknown. The KwaZulu-Natal – Free State Drakensberg are composed of softer rocks and therefore have a more rounded, softer appearance from below. Generally, the top of the escarpment is almost table-top flat and smooth, even in Lesotho. The "Lesotho Mountains" are formed away from the Drakensberg escarpment by erosion gulleys which turn into deep valleys containing tributaries of the Orange River. The large number of such tributaries give the Lesotho Highlands a very rugged mountainous appearance, both from the ground and from the air.

The higher parts of Drakensberg have a mildly periglacial environment. It is possible that recent climate change has diminished the intensity of periglaciation.

Knight and Grab mapped out the distribution of lightning strikes in the Drakensburg and discovered that lightning significantly controls the evolution of the mountain landscapes because it helps to shape the summit areas – the highest areas – with this blasting effect. Previously, angular debris was presumed to have been created by changes typical of cold, periglacial environments, such as fracturing due to frost.

=== Composition ===
The geological composition of Drakensberg (escarpment wall) varies considerably along its more than 1000 km length. The Limpopo and Mpumalanga Drakensberg are capped by an erosion resistant quartzite layer that is part of the Transvaal Supergroup, which also forms the Magaliesberg to the north and northwest of Pretoria. These rocks are more than 2000 million years old. South of the 26°S parallel the Drakensberg escarpment is composed of Ecca shales, which belong to the Karoo Supergroup, and they are 300 million years old. The portion of the Drakensberg that forms the KwaZulu-Natal – Free State border is formed by slightly younger Beaufort rocks (250 million years old) that also are part of the Karoo Supergroup.

The Ecca and Beaufort groups are composed of sedimentary rocks that are less erosion resistant than the other rocks that make up the Drakensberg escarpment. Therefore, this portion of escarpment is not so impressive as the Mpumalanga and Lesotho stretches of the Drakensberg. The Drakensberg that form the northeastern and eastern borders of Lesotho, as well as the Eastern Cape Drakensberg, are composed of a thick layer of basalt (lava) that erupted 180 million years ago. That layer rests on the youngest of the Karoo Supergroup sediments, the Clarens sandstone, which was laid down under desert conditions, about 200 million years ago.

== Geography ==
=== Peaks ===
The highest peak is Thabana Ntlenyana, at 3,482 m (11,424 ft). Other notable peaks include Mafadi at 3,450 metres (11,320 ft), Makoaneng at 3,416 metres (11,207 ft), Njesuthi at 3,408 metres (11,181 ft), Champagne Castle at 3,377 metres (11,079 ft), Giant's Castle at 3,315 metres (10,876 ft), Ben Macdhui at 3,001 metres (9,846 ft), and Popple Peak at 3,331 metres (10,928 ft), all of these are in the area bordering on Lesotho, which contains an area popular for hikers, Cathedral Peak. North of Lesotho the range becomes lower and less rugged until entering Mpumalanga where the quartzite mountains of the Transvaal Drakensberg are loftier and more broken and they form the eastern rim of the Transvaal Basin, the Blyde River Canyon lying within this stretch. The geology of this section is the same as, and continuous with, that of the Magaliesberg.

== Ecology ==
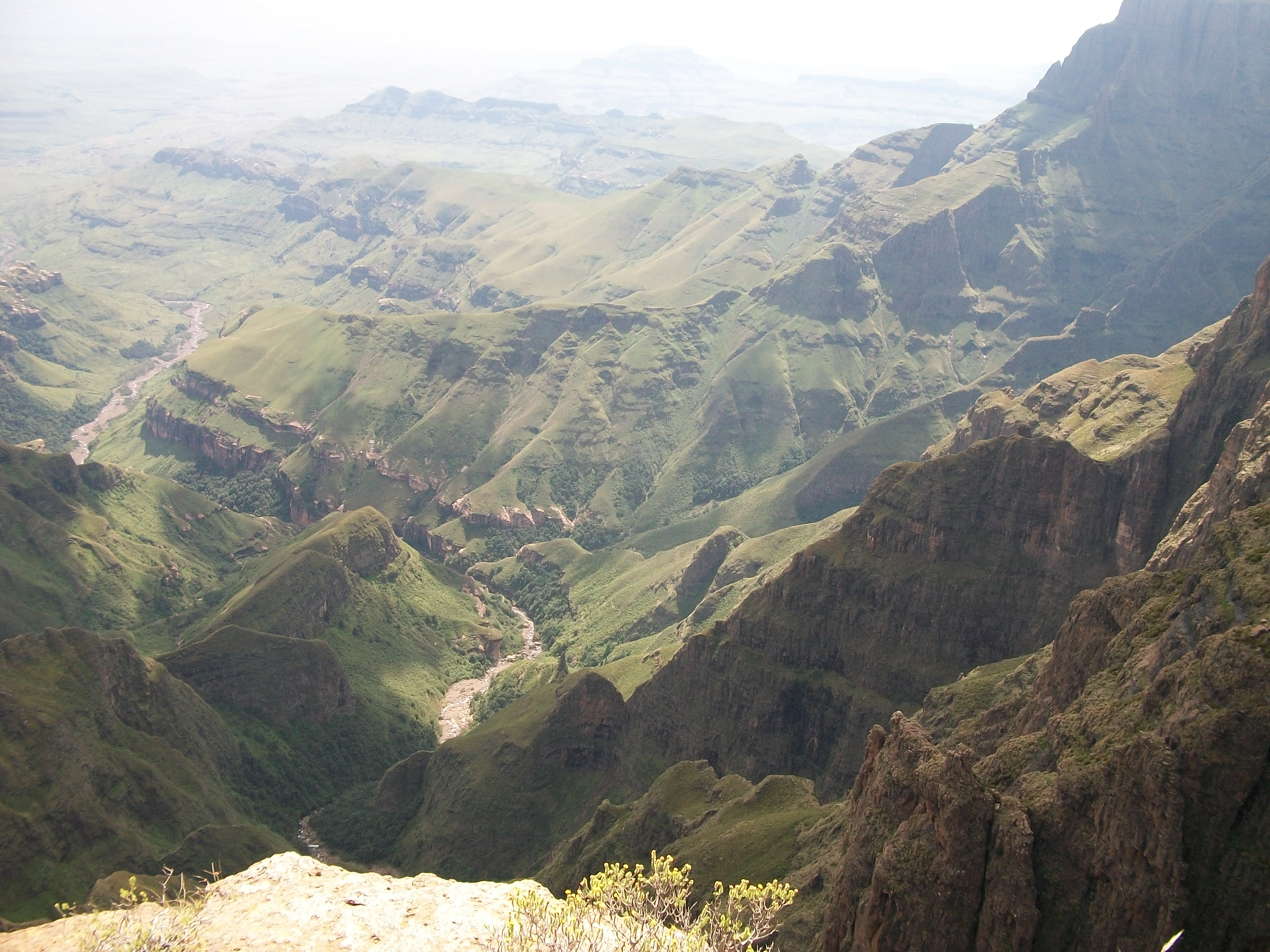
Tugela Falls vicinity – Tugela River in valley

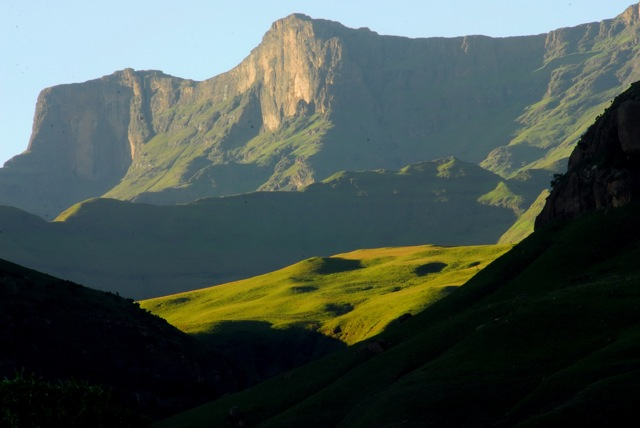
Little Saddle

The high treeless peaks of the Drakensberg (from 2,500 m (8,200 ft) upward) have been described by the World Wide Fund for Nature as the Drakensberg alti-montane grasslands and woodlands ecoregion. These steep slopes are the most southerly high mountains in Africa, and being farther from the equator provide cooler habitats at lower elevations than most mountain ranges on the continent. High rainfall generates many mountain streams and rivers, including the sources of the Orange River, southern Africa's longest, and the Tugela River.

These mountains also have the world's highest waterfall, the Tugela Falls (Thukela Falls), which has a total drop of 947 m (3,107 ft) (Venezuela's Angel Falls is also a candidate for highest waterfall). The rivers that run from the Drakensberg are an essential resource for South Africa's economy, providing water for the industrial provinces of Mpumalanga and Gauteng, which contains the city of Johannesburg. The climate is wet and cool at the high elevations, which experience snowfall in winter.

The grassy lower slopes (from 1,800 to 2,500 m (5,900 to 8,200 ft)) of the Drakensberg in Eswatini, South Africa and Lesotho constitute the Drakensberg montane grasslands, woodlands, and forests ecoregion.

=== Flora ===
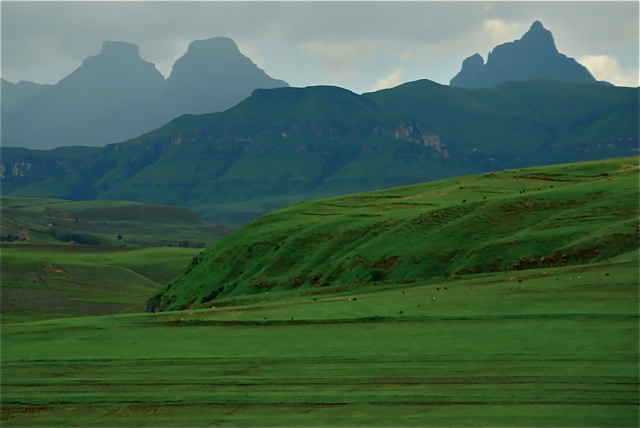
Cathedral Valley

The mountains are rich in plant life, including a large number of species listed in the Red Data Book of threatened plants, with 119 species listed as globally endangered and "of the 2 153 plant species in the park, a remarkable 98 are endemic or near-endemic".

The flora of the high alti-montane grasslands is mainly tussock grass, creeping plants, and small shrubs such as ericas. These include the rare Spiral Aloe (Aloe polyphylla), which as its name suggests, has leaves with a spiral shape.

Meanwhile, the lower slopes are mainly grassland, but are also home to conifers, which are rare in Africa, the species of conifer found in the Drakensberg belong to the genus Podocarpus. The grassland is of interest as it contains a great number of endemic plants. Grasses found here include oat grass Monocymbium ceresiiforme, Diheteropogon filifolius, Sporobolus centrifugus, caterpillar grass (Harpochloa falx), Cymbopogon dieterlenii, and Eulalia villosa.

In the highest part of Drakensberg the composition of the flora is independent on slope aspect (direction) and varies, depending on the hardness of the rock clasts. This hardness is related to weathering and is variable even within a single landform.

=== Fauna ===
The Drakensberg area is "home to 299 recorded bird species"' making up "37% of all non-marine avian species in southern Africa". There are 24 species of snakes in the Drakensberg, two of which are highly venomous.

One bird is endemic to the high peaks, the mountain pipit (Anthus hoeschi), and another six species are found mainly here: Bush blackcap (Lioptilus nigricapillus), buff-streaked chat (Oenanthe bifasciata), Rudd's lark (Heteromirafra ruddi), Drakensberg rockjumper (Chaetops aurantius), yellow-breasted pipit (Anthus chloris), and Drakensberg siskin (Serinus symonsi). The endangered Cape vulture and lesser kestrel are two of the birds of prey that hunt in the mountains. Mammals include klipspringer (Oreotragus oreotragus), eland (Taurotragus oryx), and mountain reedbuck (Redunca fulvorufula). Other endemic species include three frogs found in the mountain streams, Drakensberg river frog (Amietia dracomontana), Phofung river frog (Amietia vertebralis), and Maluti river frog (Amietia umbraculata). Fish are found in the many rivers and streams, including the Maluti redfin (Pseudobarbus quathlambae) that was thought to be extinct before being found in the Senqunyane River in Lesotho.

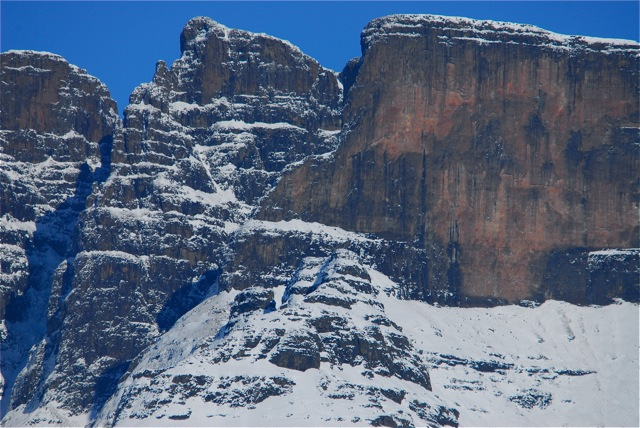
Drakensberg Cliffs

The lower slopes of the Drakensberg support much wildlife, perhaps most importantly the rare southern white rhinoceros (which was nurtured here when facing extinction) and the black wildebeest (Connochaetes gnou, which as of 2011 only thrives in protected areas and game reserves). The area is home to large herds of grazing fauna and antelopes such as eland (Taurotragus oryx), reedbuck (Redunca arundinum), mountain reedbuck (Redunca fulvorufula), grey rhebok (Pelea capreolus), and even some oribi (Ourebia ourebi). Chacma baboons also are present. Endemic species include a large number of chameleons and other reptiles. There is one endemic frog, the forest rain frog (Breviceps sylvestris), and four more species that are found mainly in these mountains; long-toed tree frog (Leptopelis xenodactylus), plaintive rain frog (Breviceps maculatus), rough rain frog (Breviceps verrucosus), and Poynton's caco (Cacosternum poyntoni).

=== Conservation ===
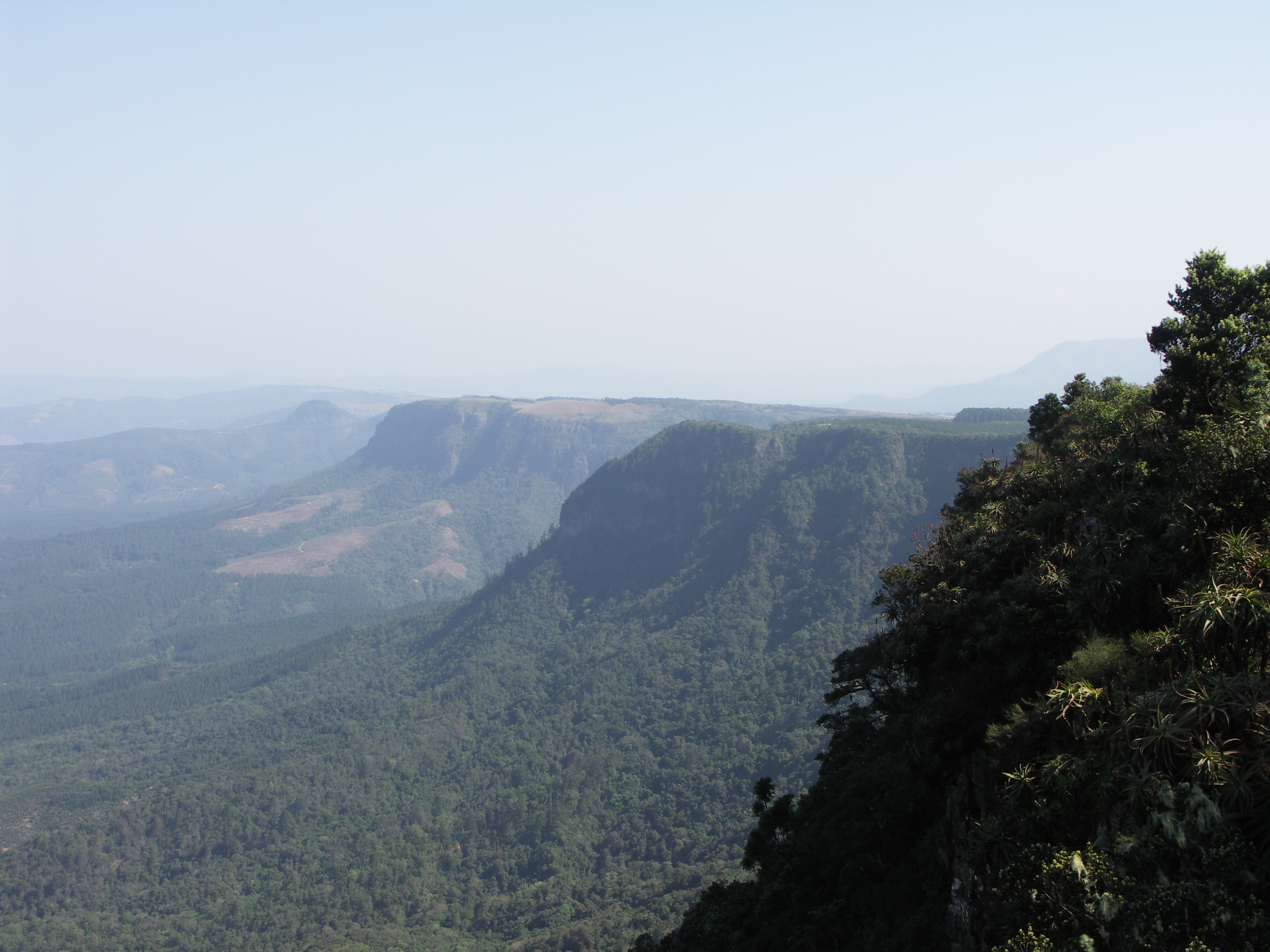
A view of the Mpumalanga Drakensberg portion of the Great Escarpment, from God's Window, near Graskop, looking south. The hard erosion resistant layer that forms the upper edge of the escarpment here consists of flat lying quartzite belonging to the Black Reef Formation, which also forms the Magaliesberg mountains near Pretoria.

The high slopes are hard to reach so the environment is fairly undamaged. However, tourism in the Drakensberg is developing, with a variety of hiking trails, hotels, and resorts appearing on the slopes. Much of the higher South African parts of the range have been designated as game reserves or wilderness areas. 7% of the Drakensberg alti-montane grasslands and woodlands ecoregion is in protected areas. These include Golden Gate Highlands National Park, Sehlabathebe National Park, Tsehlanyane National Park, Malekgalonyane Nature Reserve, Giant's Castle Game Reserve, Loteni Nature Reserve, Natal National Park, Vergelegen Nature Reserve, Beaumont Nature Reserve, and Lammergeier Highlands Nature Reserve.

Of these the uKhahlamba Drakensberg Park was listed by UNESCO in 2000 as a World Heritage site. The park also is in the List of Wetlands of International Importance (under the Ramsar Convention). The Royal Natal National Park, which contains some of the higher peaks, is part of this large park complex. Adjacent to the Ukhahlamba Drakensberg World Heritage Site is the 1900 ha Allendale Mountain Reserve, which is the largest private reserve adjoining the World Heritage Site and is found in the accessible Kamberg area, the heart of the historic San (Bushman) painting region of the Ukhahlamba.

The grassland of the lower slopes has been greatly affected by agriculture, however, especially by overgrazing. Nearly all of the original grassland and forest has disappeared and more protection is needed, although the Giant's Castle reserve is a haven for the eland and also is a breeding ground for the bearded vulture. 5.81% of the Drakensberg montane grasslands, woodlands and forests ecoregion is in protected areas. These include Kruger National Park, Mountain Zebra National Park, Golden Gate Highlands National Park, Camdeboo National Park, Sehlabathebe National Park, and Tsehlanyane National Park.

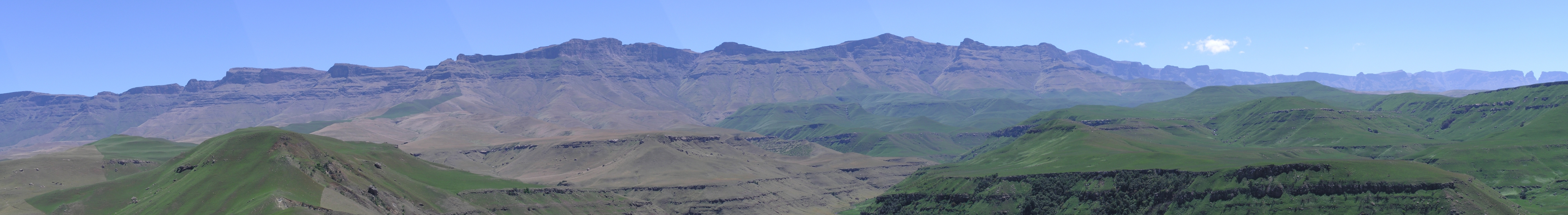
Panorama of the Giant's Castle region

The Maloti-Drakensberg Transfrontier Conservation Area was established to preserve some of the high mountain areas of the range.

== Human habitation ==
Towns and cities in the Drakensberg area include, from south to north, Matatiele and Barkly East in the Eastern Cape Province; Ladysmith, Newcastle, Ulundi – the former Zulu capital, Dundee, and Ixopo in KwaZulu-Natal; all of Lesotho, whose capital is Maseru; and Tzaneen in Limpopo Province.

=== San cave paintings ===
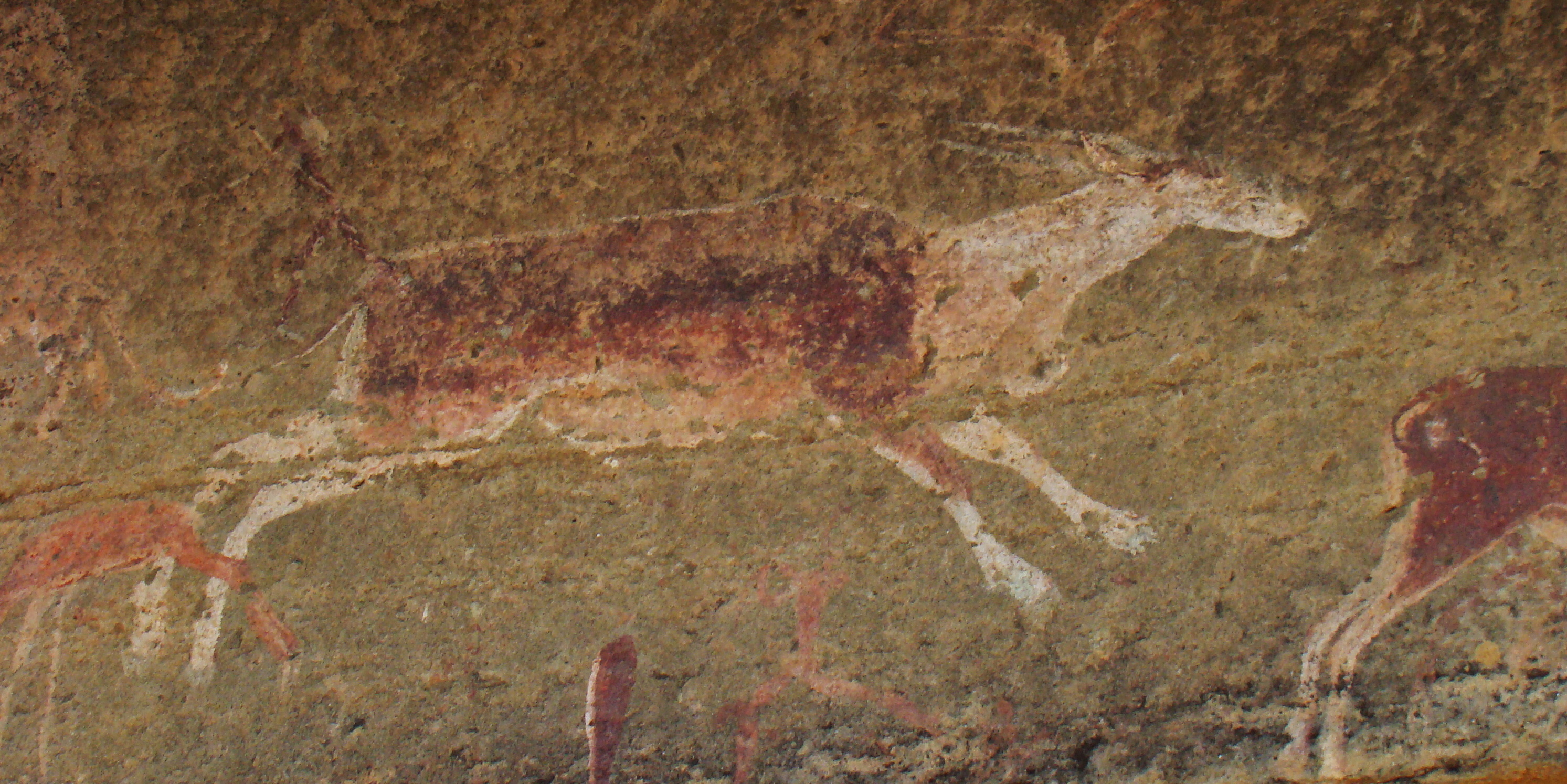
San rock painting of an eland in a Clarens Formation cave in the UKhahlamba Drakensberg Park of KwaZulu-Natal close to the Lesotho border

There are numerous caves in the easily eroded sandstone of Clarens Formation, the layer below the thick, hard basalt layer on the KwaZulu Natal-Lesotho border. Many of these caves have paintings by the San (Bushmen). This portion of the Drakensberg has between 35,000 and 40,000 works of San rock art, and is the largest collection of such parietal work in the world.

Some 20,000 individual rock paintings have been recorded at 500 different caves and overhanging sites between the Drakensberg Royal Natal National Park and Bushman's Nek. Due to the materials used in their production, these paintings are difficult to date, but there is anthropological evidence, including many hunting implements, that the San people existed in the Drakensberg at least 40,000 years ago, and possibly more than 100,000 years ago. According to mountainsides.co.za, "[i]n Nd edema Gorge in the Central Ginsberg 3,900 paintings have been recorded at 17 sites. One of them, Sebaayeni Cave, contains 1,146 individual paintings." The website, south Africa.info, indicates that although "the oldest painting on a rock shelter wall in the Ginsberg dates back about 2400 years... paint chips at least a thousand years older have also been found." The site also indicates that "[t]he rock art of the Drakensberg is the largest and most concentrated group of rock paintings in Africa south of the Sahara, and is outstanding both in quality and diversity of subject."

== See also ==
- List of mountains in South Africa
- Maloti Mountains
