= Ts'ehlanyane National Park =

National park in Lesotho

Tšehlanyane National Park
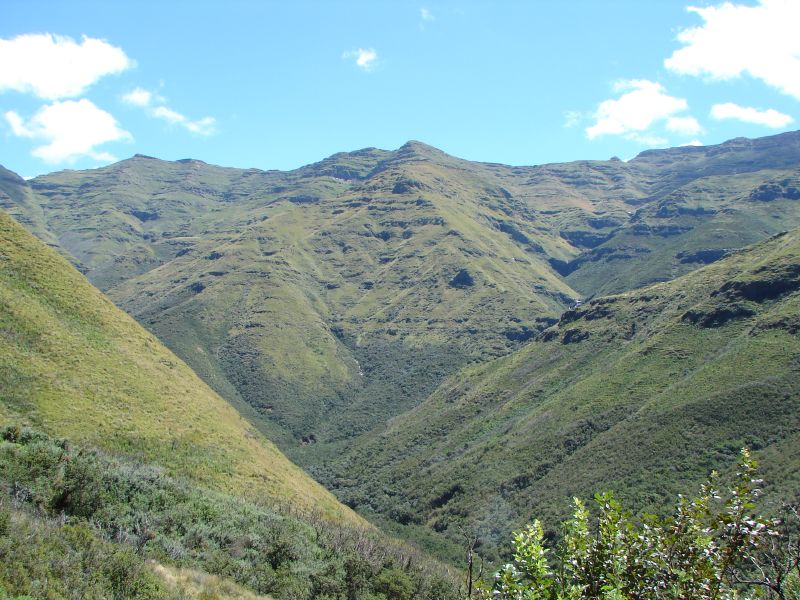
- Coordinates: 29°00′S 28°25′E
- Governing body: Lesotho Northern Parks
- Website: https://environment.gov.ls/protected-places/tsehlanyane-national-park/
- Ts'ehlanyane National Park (Lesotho)

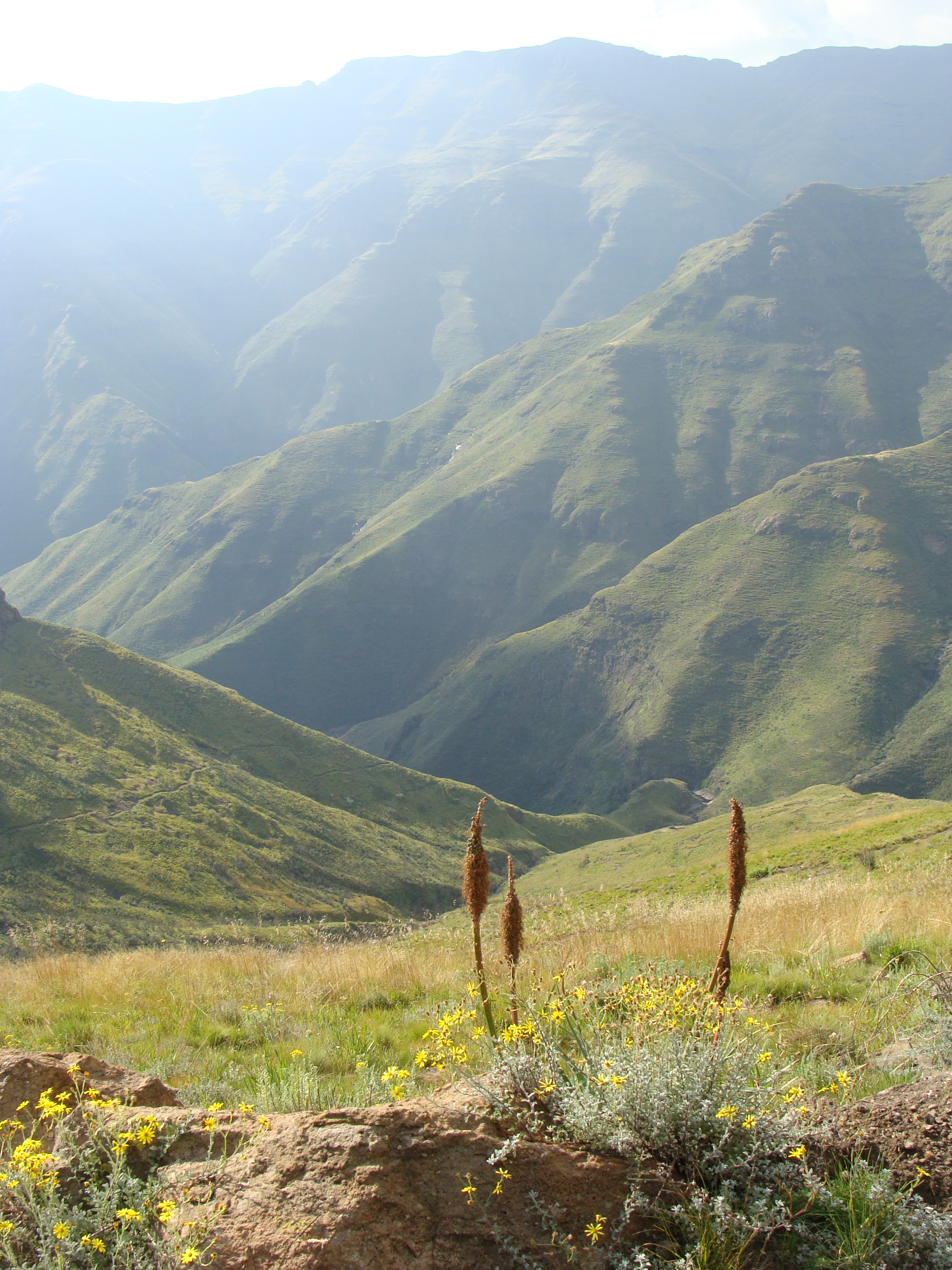
Ts'ehlanyane National Park

Ts'ehlanyane National Park is a National Park in Lesotho. It is located in the Maloti Mountains in Leribe District, and is part of the larger Maloti-Drakensberg Transfrontier Conservation Area. This Lesotho northern park protects a high-altitude, 2,600-metre (8,500 ft) patch of rugged wilderness, including one of Lesotho’s only remaining stands of indigenous forest with a number of rare undergrowth plants that are unique to this woodland habitat.

The name "Ts'ehlanyane" is the local common name for the berg bamboo (Thamnocalamus tessellatus), from which the river and park take their name. It is fitting that the park should bear the name of this Drakensberg endemic plant, as it may be the most important refuge for this plant in the entire Maloti-Drakensberg mountain range.

== History ==
This proclaimed protected pristine area lies at the junction of the Ts'ehlanyane and the Holomo rivers. It owes its origin to the access road to the "Mamohale tunnel" (May 1991), which was the first adit drive for the Lesotho Highlands Water Project. This adit covers 22 km (14 mi) from the source at Katse Dam to the As River outfall near Clarens, Free State.

== Terrain ==
This Lesotho northern park protects a high-altitude, 2,600-metre (8,500 ft) patch of rugged wilderness, including one of Lesotho's few stands of indigenous forest with a number of rare undergrowth plants that are unique to this woodland habitat. Here indigenous "ouhout" (Leucosidea) trees of significant size are preserved.

The park has an altitude ranging from 1,940 to 3,112 metres (6,365 to 10,210 ft) and is considered mostly sub-alpine. The diversity of habitat types is exceptionally wide and derived from the large altitudinal range that the park has.

== Biota ==
- Avifauna: Species of interest include the
  - bearded vulture
  - alpine swift
  - lanner falcon
  - ground woodpecker
  - grey-winged francolin
  - malachite sunbird
  - white-necked raven
  - rock kestrel and black stork
  There are also the alpine endemics, such as the
  - Drakensberg siskin
  - mountain pipit
  - sentinel rock-thrush and Drakensberg rockjumper
- Fauna: Indigenous mammals include
  - Sloggett's vlei rat
  - Cape clawless otter
  - black-backed jackal
  - rock dassie
  - Smith's red rock hare
  - porcupine
  - caracal
  - rhebok
  - mountain reedbuck
  - common eland (released November 2009)
  - baboons and serval cat
  Snakes include the berg adder.
- Flora: On the banks of the rivers and streams are stands of berg bamboo which are of significant cultural significance to the Basotho people. Berg bamboo is the host plant for an endangered butterfly species, the bamboo sylph Metisella syrinx. The reserve also encompasses a reasonable proportion of very rare mountain "fynbos" that do not occur anywhere else in the world. Also recorded are in excess of 220 flowering plant species.
  Lesotho's national plant is the spiral aloe, among other varied and abundant alpine flora, including over 180 flowering species.

== Bird species ==
Bird species found in the park include:

- Black-headed heron
- Cattle egret
- Hamerkop
- Yellow-billed duck
- African black duck
- Bearded vulture
- Black-winged kite
- Steppe buzzard
- Jackal buzzard
- Lanner falcon
- Rock kestrel
- Grey-winged francolin
- Helmeted guineafowl
- Rock pigeon
- Cape turtle dove
- Laughing dove
- Red-chested cuckoo
- Diederik cuckoo
- Spotted eagle owl
- Black swift
- Speckled mousebird
- Pied barbet
- Ground woodpecker
- Long-billed lark
- Red-capped lark
- European swallow
- Orange-breasted rockjumper
- Spotted flycatcher
- Fairy flycatcher
- Cape wagtail
- Rock martin
- Banded martin
- Black crow
- Pied crow
- White-necked raven
- Red-eyed bulbul
- Cape rock thrush
- Sentinel rock thrush
- Mountain chat
- Familiar chat
- Stonechat (subsp. oreobates)
- Orange-throated longclaw
- Fiscal shrike
- Pied starling
- Red-winged starling
- Malachite sunbird
- Cape white-eye
- House sparrow
- Cape sparrow
- Cape weaver
- Masked weaver
- Pin-tailed whydah
- Black-throated canary
- Cape canary
- Yellow canary
- Cape bunting
- Rock bunting

== Wild flower and shrub species ==
Wild flowers and shrubs recorded at Ts'ehlanyane National Park on the Matsa-Mararo route via Lets'a-le-ts'o and the lower bridle path (4 × 4 track) that leads to Holomo Pass
(* = exotic)

1. * Cannabis sativa
2. * Persicaria lapathifolia: (Note: specimens collected by Patsy Millin (31 Jan 2006 – 2 Feb 2006)) exotic, robust annual herb in damp areas
3. * Solanum sp. (wild potato)
4. Ajuga ophrydis (bugle-plant)
5. Alepidea amatymbica (Lesoko): large serrated (basal) leaves, tall herb. Tea made from leaves applied as cough and cold remedy
6. Alepidia cf. woodii: small herb with white, star-like flowers
7. Anisodontea julii subsp. pannosa (lefeta; mountain hibiscus; wildestokroos): shrub, 1–4 m (3 ft 3 in – 13 ft 1 in), flowers shiny pink. On the Holomo Pass bridle path, often near streams in scrub forest.
8. Argyrolobium tuberosum
9. Argyrolobium sp.: yellow pea-flowers
10. Asclepias fruticosa
11. Berkheya cirsiifolia: thorny sub-shrub with white daisy-like flowers, damp Basalt slopes at approx. 2,200 m (7,200 ft)
12. Cephalaria natalensis
13. Clematis brachiata: common climber esp. on dead cheche trees next to the 4 × 4 track leading to the Holomo Pass bridle path
14. Coccinia sp. or Zehneria sp.: climber in cheche forest, deeply lobed leaves, hairy. Small cucumber-like fruit of approx. 30 mm (1.2 in) in length (slightly bitter, probably poisonous)
15. Conium sp.: tall herb >1 m (39 in), slightly aromatic
16. Cotyledon orbiculata: on eroded basalt cliffs (south-east facing) next to the Ts'ehlanyane river
17. Crassula cf. natalensis: small succulent (200 mm (7.9 in)) on damp rocks next to the Lets'a-le-ts'o trail
18. Crassula sarcocaulis: on eroded basalt cliffs (south-east facing) next to the Ts'ehlanyane river
19. Diascia cf. barberae
20. Dierama cf. cooperi: white, with mauve and yellow flecks on inside of perianth. Next to 4 × 4 track directly above the conference centre
21. Dichilus reflexus
22. Disa cooperi: light pink with long spur, fragrant, evident in the vicinity of the quarry
23. Erica caffrorum: large shrub or small tree
24. Erica oatessi: shrub with pink, bottle-shaped flowers
25. Eucomis autumnalis subsp. clavata
26. Euphorbia cf. natalensis: herb
27. Euryops evansii
28. Euryops sp.: large shrub up to 2 m (6 ft 7 in), small fynbos-like leathery leaves, small yellow flowers
29. Geranium cf. wakkerstroomianum
30. Geranium pulchrum
31. other Geranium spp.
32. Gladiolius crassifolius
33. Gladiolius dalenii
34. Gunnera perpensa (qobo; wild rhubarb; rivierpampoen): usually in large stands, marshy places, or sub-shade
35. Habenaria epipactidea: greenish flowers with long white spur, one example seen on the 4×4 track leading to the Holomo Pass bridal path
36. Helichrysum cooperi
37. Helichrysum herbaceum: golden yellow everlasting with small overlapping leaves
38. Helichrysum mundtii
39. Helichrysum splendidum
40. Jamesbritennia sp.: ill-aromatic herb, or sub-shrub, on path, disturbed soil
41. Lobelia spp.
42. Lotononis sp.: : greyish sub-shrub, blue pea-flowers
43. Myssotis semiamplexicaulis (Forget-me-not): common on disturbed areas i.e. the path, pink – deep blue
44. Orchidaceae: small leaves similar to Agapanthus, Disa thodei?
45. Orchidaceae: yellow-green flowers with two wings, long spur, probably Habenaria epipactidea
46. Oxalis smithiana: leaves are deeply divided, lobes narrow. Pink flowers. Common on the lower Lets'a-le-ts'o trail
47. Passerina drakensbergensis (berg gonna): large shrub in scrub
48. Pelargonium cf. ranuncullophyllum: herb with small white flowers, tiny pink flecks on the inside of petals. Leaves with purplish brown mark. Common on the lower Lets’a-le-ts’o trail
49. Pentzia cooperi
50. Phygelius capensis: grassy slopes within cheche forest, damp and rocky moist slopes and on streambanks. Flowers curved.
51. Printzia cf. pyrifolia : grassy slopes within cheche forest
52. Plectranthus grallatus: common in shade of cheche forest
53. Polygala cf. rhinostigma: small perennial herb, pink flowers
54. Polygala cf. uncinata: perennial herb, purple flowers
55. Polygala virgata: common shrub next to 4×4 track leading to the Holomo Pass bridal path
56. Rumex cf. saggitatus: climber on dead/burnt cheche en route to the Matsa-mararo falls from Lets'a-le-ts'o. Heart-shaped leaves, conspicuous fruit: papery 3-winged, pink-red en masse
57. Satyrium parviflorum: small yellowish green flowers on long spike, petals drying brown soon after flowering. Basal leaves, heart-shaped, fairly large
58. Scabiosa cf. columbaria
59. Schizoglossum artropurpureum subsp. artropurpureum
60. Scilla natalensis : on basalt cliffs south of the Ts’ehlanyane river
61. Selago cf. melliodora: white inflorescence, honey scented, next to path near Matsa-mararo falls
62. Selago galpinii
63. Senecio macrocephalus
64. Senecio sp.: common, herbaceous shrub with masses of yellow flowers. Large stands in damp areas or rocky places
65. Silene cf. burchelli: pink, near campsite at river deck
66. Stachys cf. aethiopica
67. Thalictrum cf. rhyncocarpum: herb, forest floor near and on the lower Lets'a-le-ts'o path, leaves resemble maidenhair fern (Adianthium cappilus-veneris)
68. Thamnocalamus tessellatus (liqaloe; berg bamboo; bergbamboes) damp slopes and near rivers/streams 3–4 m (9.8–13.1 ft) tall. Endangered species in South Africa
69. Unknown species: common on disturbed soil, small herb (150 mm), leaves are serrated and spatulate, of particular interest are the discoloured characteristic of the leaves: above green and below purple-pink
70. Vernonia hirsuta
71. Wahlenbergia krebsii
72. Xerophyta viscosa: on eroded basalt cliffs (south-east-facing) next to the Ts'ehlanyane river
73. Zaluzianskya cf. microsiphon
74. Zaluzianskya smitziae: night-flowering species, common on the trail between Lets'a-le-ts'o and Matsa-mararo falls

== Indigenous tree species in the Park ==
Indigenous trees as seen at the campsite, on the lower Lets'a-le-ts'o path en route to Matsa-Mararo falls and the lower bridle path (4x4 track) that leads to Holomo Pass

1. *Rosa eglanteria (rosehip): thorny tree, pink flowers followed by orange–red fruit, in scrub forest near river and cheche forest
2. Buddleja loricata (lelora; mountain sage; bergsaliehout) very similar to B. salviifolia but leaves are leathery, lanceolate, whilst B. salviifolia leaves are softer and oval/heart-shaped at base. B. loricata usually at higher altitudes than B. salviifolia, but their habitats do overlap(1,800–2,450 m (5,910–8,040 ft)). Inflorescences of B. loricata, smaller, only white, sweetly scented. B. loricata common in the vicinity of Lets'a-le-ts'o.
3. Buddleja salviifolia (lelothoane; quilted sage; saliehout) Very similar to B. loricata but leaves and inflorescence differ: see B. loricata (supra). Flowers: fragrant, white to mauve in spring.
4. Diospyros austroafricana subsp. africana (liperekisi-tsa-makhoaba, senokonoko; firesticks star-apple; kritikom; vuurmaakbossie; jakkalsbessie) usually a shrub, sometimes small tree, grey appearance. Flowers: pink to red, highly fragrant during springtime. Fruit conspicuous: grey-green, red to black when ripe up to 20 mm (0.79 in) in diameter.
5. Heteromorpha trifoliata (monkhoane; parsley tree; pietersieliebos) small tree with conspicuous bark peeling off in papery flakes, on steep slopes and cliffs where protection from veld fires esp. vicinity of the Matsa-mararo falls. Flowers and seeds resemble parsley.
6. Leucosidea sericea (cheche; oldwood: ouhout), according to an entomological study made on the cheche of the Golden Gate area (EFS), these trees are the habitat of 117 species of beetles
7. Myrsine africana (semapo; Cape myrtle; mirting) evergreen shrub with very small leaves, toothed in upper half, rarely a tree
8. Rhamnus prinoides (mofifi; dogwood; blinkblaar) small tree, often in shade of cheche forest. Glossy-green leaves, small red–black berries
9. Rhus divaricata (kolitsane; rusty-leaved current; roesblaartaaibos) shrub or small tree with trifoliate leaves, slightly leathery, dark olive green above, grey-green–rusty-brown hairs beneath, large numbers of small yellow to brown berries 3 mm (0.12 in) in diameter.

== Other tree species ==
Other trees expected to occur in the area include:

1. Bowkeria verticillata (isiduli; umbaba; southern shell-flower)
2. Euclea crispa (mohlakola; blue guarri)
3. Halleria lucida (lebetsa; tree fuchsia; notsung)
4. Passerina montana (lekhapu; mountain gonna)
5. Rhus dentata (lebelebele; nana-berry)
6. Rhus pyroides (kolitsane; common taaibos)

== Fern species ==
Ferns and fern allies

Underneath shade of cheche forest, an abundance of ferns occur: Polystichum spp. and Cheilanthes quadripinnata. Pteris cretica in damp places often near boulders. In exposed areas on rocky mountain slopes, typical poikylohydrous species evident like the resurrection fern and Cheilanthes eckloniana. Selaginella spp. expected on exposed rock surfaces.

== Location ==
The park is located deep in the northern range of the Maloti Mountains at the foot of the Holomo Pass and only about 45 minutes on tarred road from the South African border post of Caledonspoort, 15 minutes drive from the popular Free State town of Clarens and about 4 hours from O. R. Tambo International Airport).

== Activities ==
- Maliba Lodge accommodation is located within the park
- Numerous hiking and bridle paths have already been established with the park, one of which is a spectacular 39 km trail linking the Ts'ehlanyane National Park with the Bokong Nature Reserve.
- Photographic opportunities. Not only is the scenery spectacular, but the fauna and flora offer a boundless variety of photographic subjects.
- Basuto pony rides offer an ideal way to explore nature from a higher vantage point.
- Swimming in the pristine streams and rock pools
- Small to medium-sized game viewing with about 24 species present
- Massage treatments at Maliba Lodge Spa
- Restaurant meals and viewing/photography deck at Maliba Lodge

== How to get there ==
A 32-kilometre (20 mi) tarred access road leaves the main A1 route 8 km (5.0 mi) south of Butha-Buthe. The route passes through the village of Khabo and parallels the Hlotse river along the Holomo valley until it reaches the park entrance gate.

== See also ==
- Climate Change in Lesotho
