= List of World Heritage Sites in South Africa =

Location of World Heritage Sites in South Africa. Red dots represent cultural sites, green dots natural sites, and blue dots mixed sites. Purple dots indicate the Fossil Hominid Sites, yellow dots are the Pleistocene Occupation Sites, and black dots are the Nelson Mandela Legacy Sites.

The United Nations Educational, Scientific and Cultural Organization (UNESCO) World Heritage Sites are places of importance to cultural or natural heritage as described in the UNESCO World Heritage Convention, established in 1972. Cultural heritage consists of monuments (such as architectural works, monumental sculptures, or inscriptions), groups of buildings, and sites (including archaeological sites). Natural heritage comprises natural features (physical and biological formations), geological and physiographical formations (including habitats of threatened animal and plant species), and natural sites that are important from the perspectives of science, conservation, or natural beauty. South Africa accepted the convention on 10 July 1997. There are twelve World Heritage Sites in South Africa.

The first three sites in South Africa were added to the list in 1999, while the most recent ones, the Nelson Mandela Legacy Sites and the Pleistocene Occupation Sites of South Africa, were added in 2024. Seven sites are listed for their cultural significance, four for their natural significance, and one site, Maloti-Drakensberg Park, is listed for both. This site is transnational as it is shared with Lesotho, and so is iSimangaliso Wetland Park – Maputo National Park that is shared with Mozambique. South Africa has served as a member of the World Heritage Committee three times: 1999–2005, 2009–2013, and 2019–2023.

== World Heritage Sites ==
UNESCO lists sites under ten criteria; each entry must meet at least one criterion. Criteria i through vi are cultural, and vii through x are natural.

* Transnational site

World Heritage Sites
Site	Image	Location (province)	Year listed	UNESCO data	Description
Fossil Hominid Sites of South Africa	Skull of a 2.1 million years old Australopithecus africanus	North West, Limpopo, Gauteng	1999	915bis; iii, vi (cultural)	This site comprises caves and other locations where the remains of Australopithecus africanus, dating up to 3.5 million years ago, and Paranthropus, dating up to 4.5 million years ago, were discovered, providing crucial insight into human evolution. The sites at Sterkfontein (A. africanus skull, known as Mrs. Ples, pictured), Swartkrans, and Kromdraai, collectively named the Cradle of Humankind, were listed in 1999. Makapan Valley and Taung, where the Taung Child was found, were added in 2005.
Robben Island	Prison building and a sign saying Maximum Security Prison	Western Cape	1999	916; iii, iv (cultural)	Robben Island, a small island off the coast of Cape Town, was, at different periods between the 17th and 20th centuries, used as a hospital, prison, and a military base. It was used as a leper colony in the 19th century and as a maximum security prison for political prisoners during the Apartheid era, especially after the 1960s. Nelson Mandela, the anti-Apartheid activist, who later became the president of the country, was imprisoned here for 18 years. Today, the island symbolizes the victory of the human spirit and democracy over oppression and racism.
iSimangaliso Wetland Park – Maputo National Park*	A lake with a shore house and some birds	KwaZulu-Natal	1999	914; vii, ix, x (natural)	The iSimangaliso Park, located at the meeting point between tropical and subtropical Africa, features a mosaic of different types of habitats, including wetlands, sandy dunes, beaches, lakes (Lake St. Lucia pictured), and coral reefs. The area is rich in biodiversity, with large colonies of breeding waterbirds, sea turtles nesting on beaches, and whales and dolphins in the sea. The site was expanded in 2025 to include Maputo National Park in Mozambique.
Maloti-Drakensberg Park*	Rock formations on the top of a hill, lush green vegetation	KwaZulu-Natal	2000	985; i, iii, vii, x (mixed)	The site comprises the uKhahlamba-Drakensberg Park (pictured), originally listed independently in 2000, and the Sehlabathebe National Park in Lesotho, which was added in 2013. The area is known for its scenic beauty with basalt rock formations, river gorges, and grasslands. It is rich in biodiversity, in particular in numerous plant and bird species. The San people, who lived in the area for more than four millennia, created rock art depicting humans and animals. There are approximately 690 rock art sites in the park.
Mapungubwe Cultural Landscape	A hill in a dry area with sparse trees	Limpopo	2003	1099bis; ii, iii, iv, v (cultural)	The Kingdom of Mapungubwe was the first large kingdom in southern Africa, existing roughly between 900 and 1300. It was located in an open savanna at the confluence of the Limpopo and Shashe rivers. They traded with India and China and produced gold and ivory. The kingdom collapsed due to climate change, as droughts rendered the area unsuitable for agriculture. Remains of palaces and settlements have been preserved. A minor boundary modification took place in 2014.
Cape Floral Region Protected Areas	Different plants representing the Cape flora, including a plant with red flowers	Western Cape, Eastern Cape	2004	1007ter; ix, x (natural)	The site comprises a series of national parks and protected areas that are home to the plants of one of the six floral kingdoms of the world. The area is remarkably rich in biodiversity: although it covers less than 0.5% of Africa, it is home to 20% of the continent's plant species. The fynbos vegetation of fine-leaved shrubland is adapted to the Mediterranean climate of the region and to occasional fires. Many plants rely on pollination and seed dispersal by insects, birds, and mammals. Several plant species are of conservation concern. A significant modification to the site boundaries took place in 2015 and a minor one in 2025.
Vredefort Dome	Satellite image of the impact structure	North West, Free State	2005	1162; viii (natural)	The Vredefort Dome (satellite image pictured) is the impact structure, or astrobleme, created by a meteorite that hit the Earth around 2 billion years ago, releasing massive amounts of energy and causing devastating global effects. It is the oldest and, with a radius of 190 km (120 mi), the largest impact crater discovered on Earth so far. Although the structure has been deeply eroded, it is important in geological studies of meteorite impact sites. Geological strata covering 3.2 billion years are exposed.
Richtersveld Cultural and Botanical Landscape	Two huts in an arid landscape	Northern Cape	2007	1265; iv, v (cultural)	The cultural landscape of Richtersveld has been shaped over at least two millennia by the semi-nomadic Nama people, who still maintain a lifestyle that was historically much more widespread in southern Africa. The Nama practice transhumance pastoralism involves the seasonal movement of herds. They live in portable demountable mat-roofed houses, haru om (examples pictured). They have extensive knowledge of the medicinal plants that they collect.
ǂKhomani Cultural Landscape	Evening scene in a savanna	Northern Cape	2017	1545; v, vi (cultural)	The cultural landscape of the Kgalagadi Transfrontier Park has been inhabited since the Stone Age by hunter-gatherer groups and is today associated with the formerly nomadic ǂKhomani people and related San groups. They have developed a lifestyle that enables them to survive in the harsh Kalahari Desert. They have developed specific ethnobotanical knowledge, and today they actively protect their cultural traditions.
Barberton Makhonjwa Mountains	Satellite image of the area with hills	Mpumalanga	2018	1575; viii (natural)	The mountains (satellite image pictured) contain some of the oldest geological structures on Earth. A sequence of volcanic and sedimentary rocks, dating to 3.6 billion years ago and spanning 340 million years, provides insight into the period when the first primitive unicellular life developed on Earth. The rocks document lava flows, meteorite bombardment, anoxic oceans, and the early atmosphere of the planet.
Human Rights, Liberation and Reconciliation: Nelson Mandela Legacy Sites	A large semi-circular building with two towers and an equestrian statue in font	Gauteng, Eastern Cape, KwaZulu-Natal, Western Cape, Free State	2024	1676; vi (cultural)	This site comprises 14 sites associated with human rights activists opposing the Apartheid regime of South Africa in the 20th century. The sites include the Union Buildings (pictured) in Pretoria, which is today the seat of the government, the site of the Sharpeville massacre and related commemorative sites, and the sites related to the life of Nelson Mandela. They illustrate the key events in the fight against the Apartheid as well as the philosophical beliefs based on non-racialism and Ubuntu that eventually led to the 1993 Interim Constitution of South Africa.
The Emergence of Modern Human Behaviour: The Pleistocene Occupation Sites of South Africa		KwaZulu-Natal, Western Cape	2024	1723; iii, iv, v (cultural)	Based on genetic and fossil evidence, anatomically modern humans developed from archaic predecessors in Africa around 200,000 years ago. This site comprises three caves and rock shelters at different points occupied by Stone Age societies. The findings, including remains of small hearths, tools, and early art, provide insight into the life of these people. The sites are: Diepkloof Rock Shelter (pictured), Pinnacle Point Site Complex, and Sibhudu Cave.

== Tentative list ==
In addition to sites inscribed on the World Heritage List, member states can maintain a list of tentative sites that they may consider for nomination. Nominations for the World Heritage List are accepted only if the site was previously listed on the Tentative List. South Africa currently does not have any sites on the tentative list.

== See also ==
- List of heritage sites in South Africa
