= Maliba Lodge =

Hotel in Lesotho

Coordinates: 28.914740°S 28.437294°E

Maliba Lodge is located within the Ts'ehlanyane National Park which is Lesotho's Largest National Park and is in the Maloti Mountains in Butha-Buthe District.

Maliba Lodge offers a range of accommodation types including 5 Star Luxury and 3 Star self-catering.
