= Sterkfontein Dam Nature Reserve =

Nature reserve in West State, South Africa

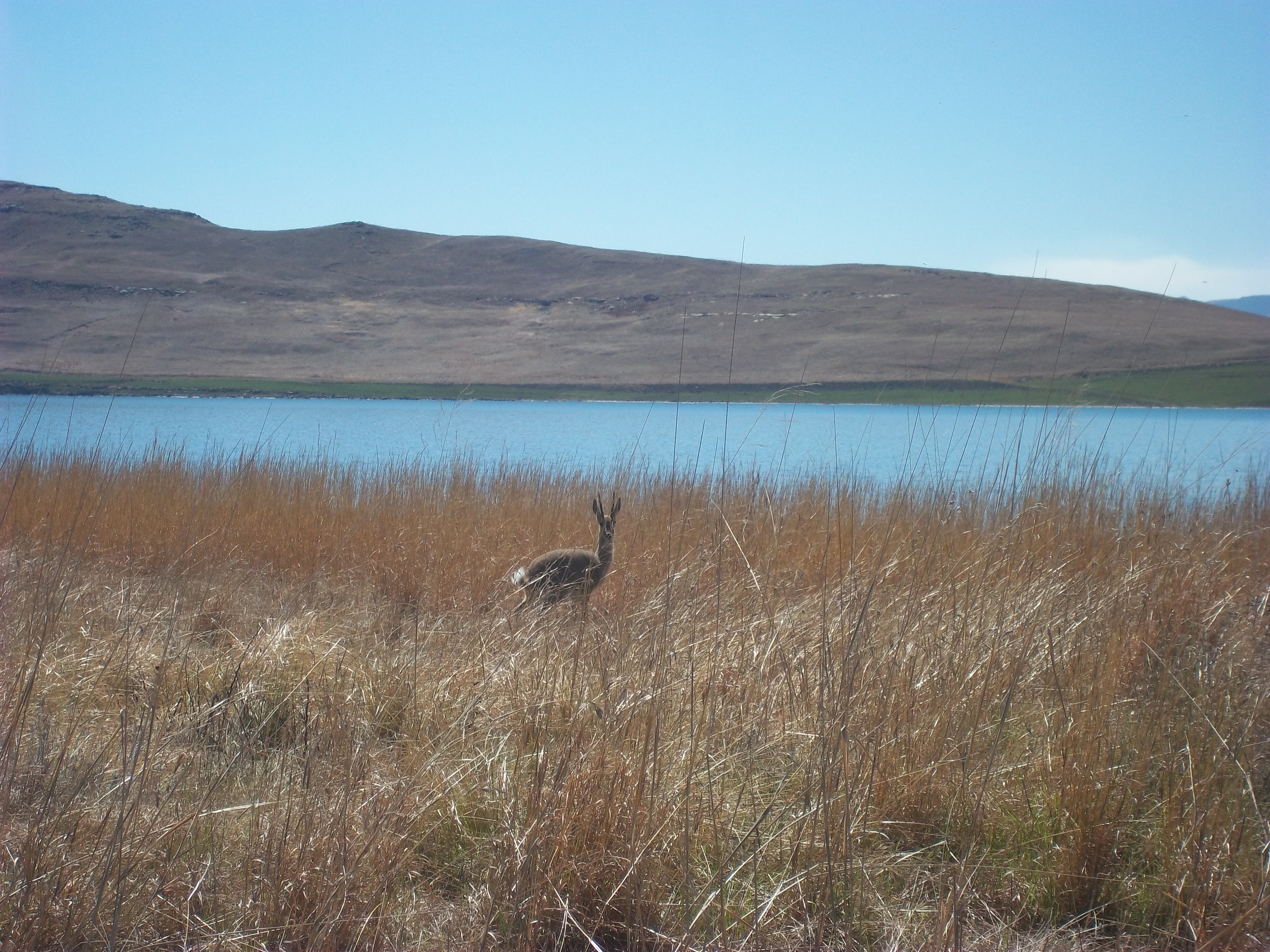
- Grey rhebuck at the nature reserve 16 September 2011
- Nearest city: Harrismith
- Coordinates: 28°24′S 29°02′E
- Area: 18,000 ha (44,000 acres)
- Website: Sterkfontein/Harrismith - Website
- Sterkfontein Dam Nature Reserve (South Africa)

Sterkfontein Dam Nature Reserve is an 18,000 ha reserve situated to the south west of Harrismith, Free State, South Africa. The reserve is close to the Drakensberg Mountain nature reserve. The reserve offers campsites, hiking trails and a large variety of fauna and flora.

== Fauna and flora ==
=== Antelope ===
- Oribi
- Mountain reedbuck
- Grey rhebuck

=== Birdlife ===
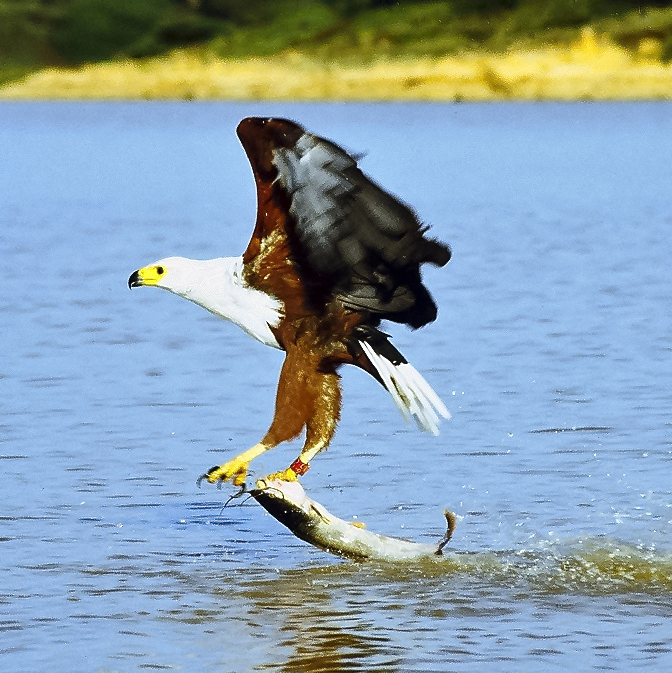
African fish eagle

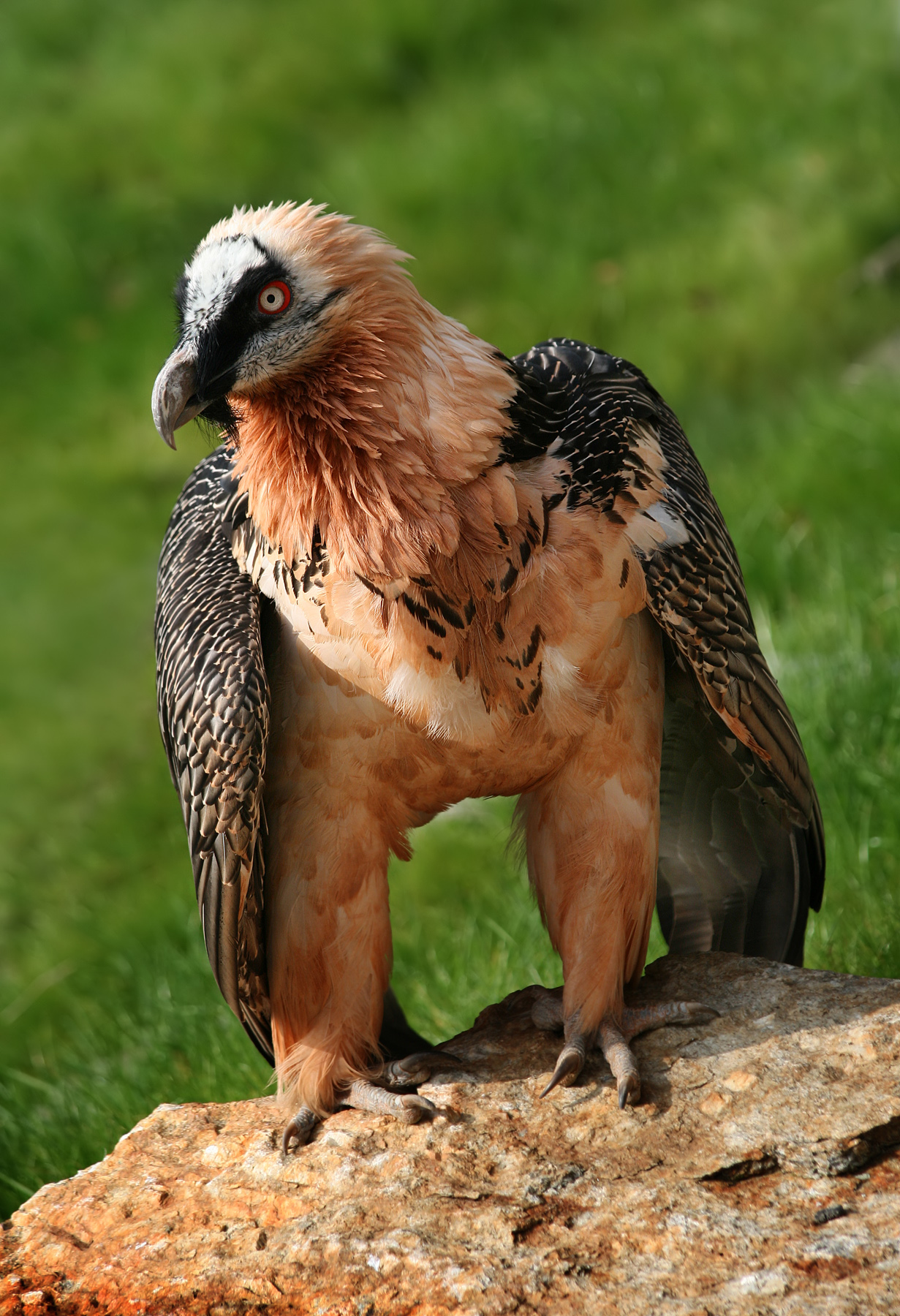
Bearded vulture

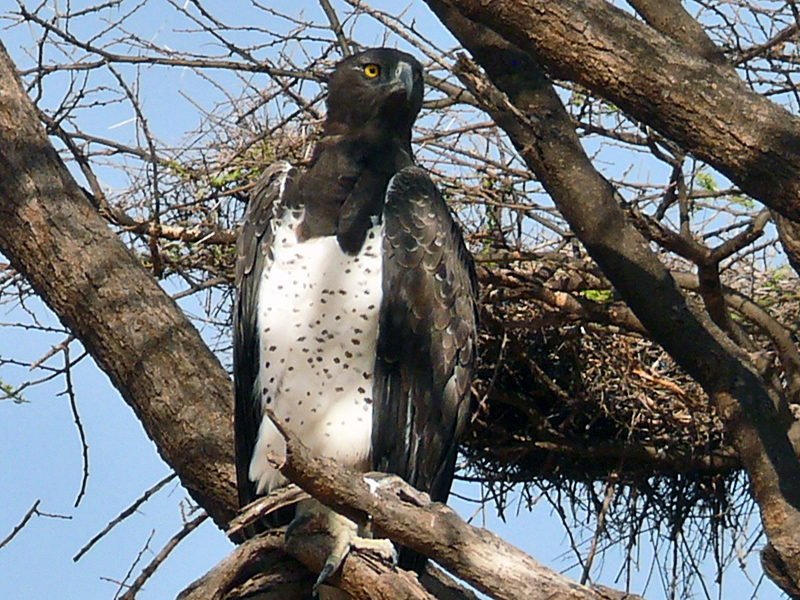
Martial eagle

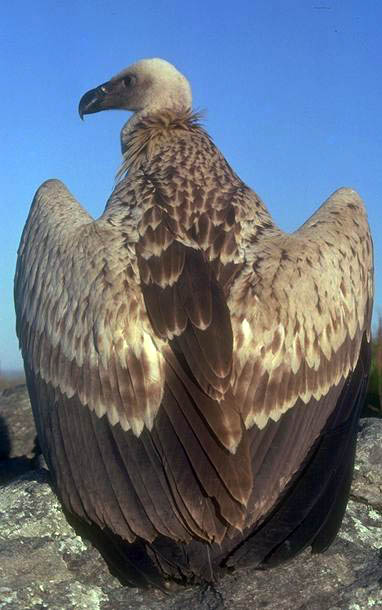
Cape vulture

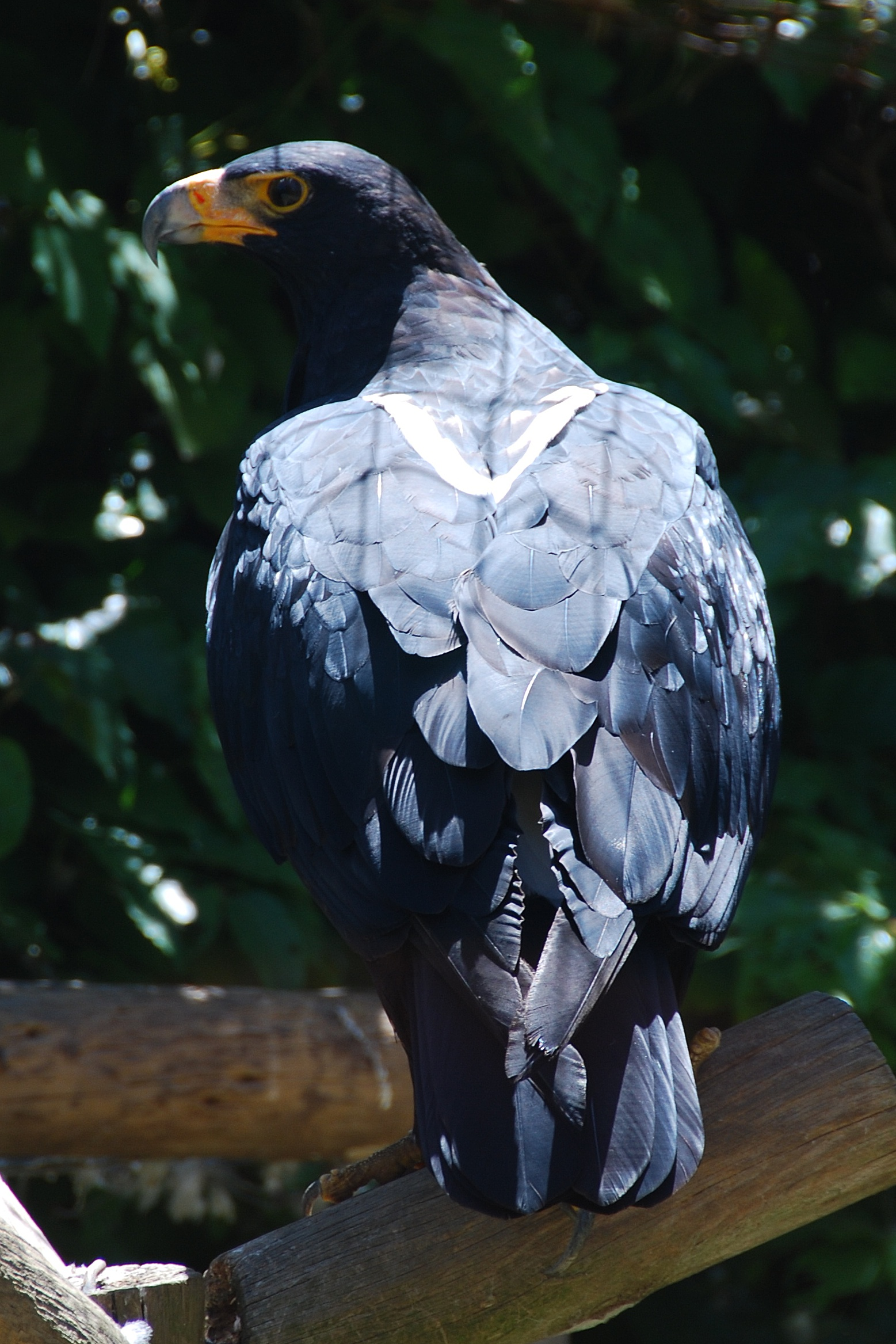
Verreaux's eagle

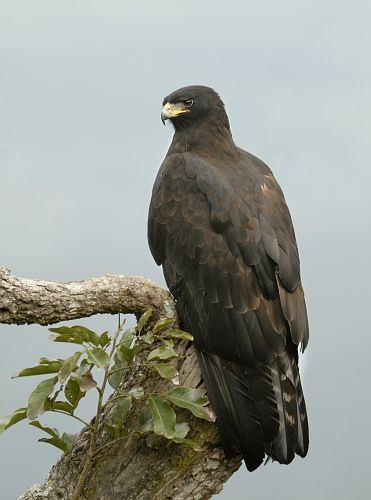
Black eagle

=== Trees ===
- Yellowwood
- Wild peach
- Koko tree
- Silky bark

=== Grasses and bushes ===
- Wild myrtle
- Redwood rooihout (not to be confused with the redwood tree)
- Ouhout
- Bush guarri
- Highveld protea
- Silver sugarbush
- Tree fern

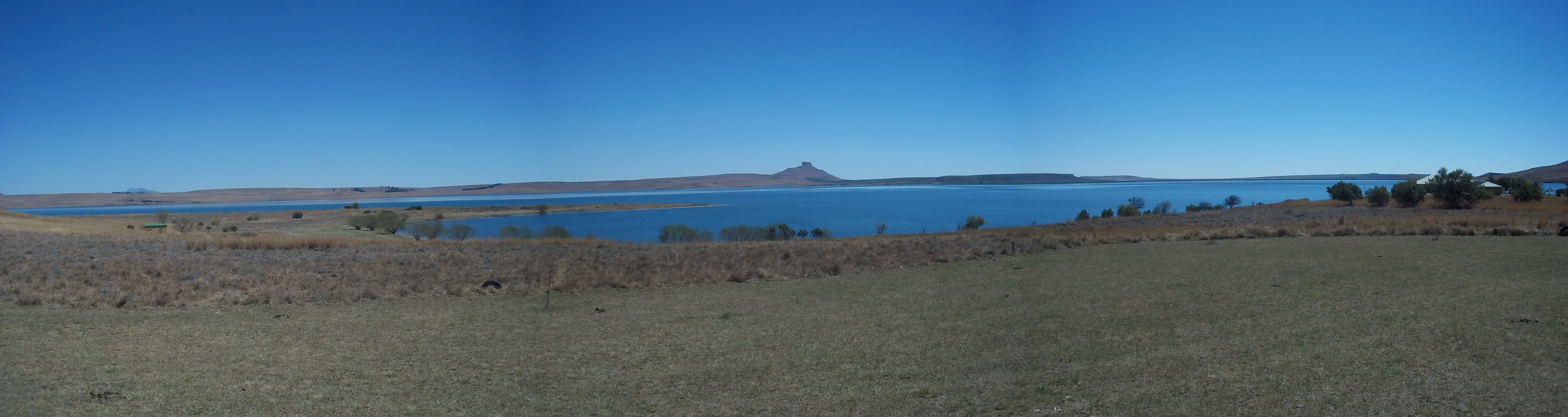

== Gallery ==
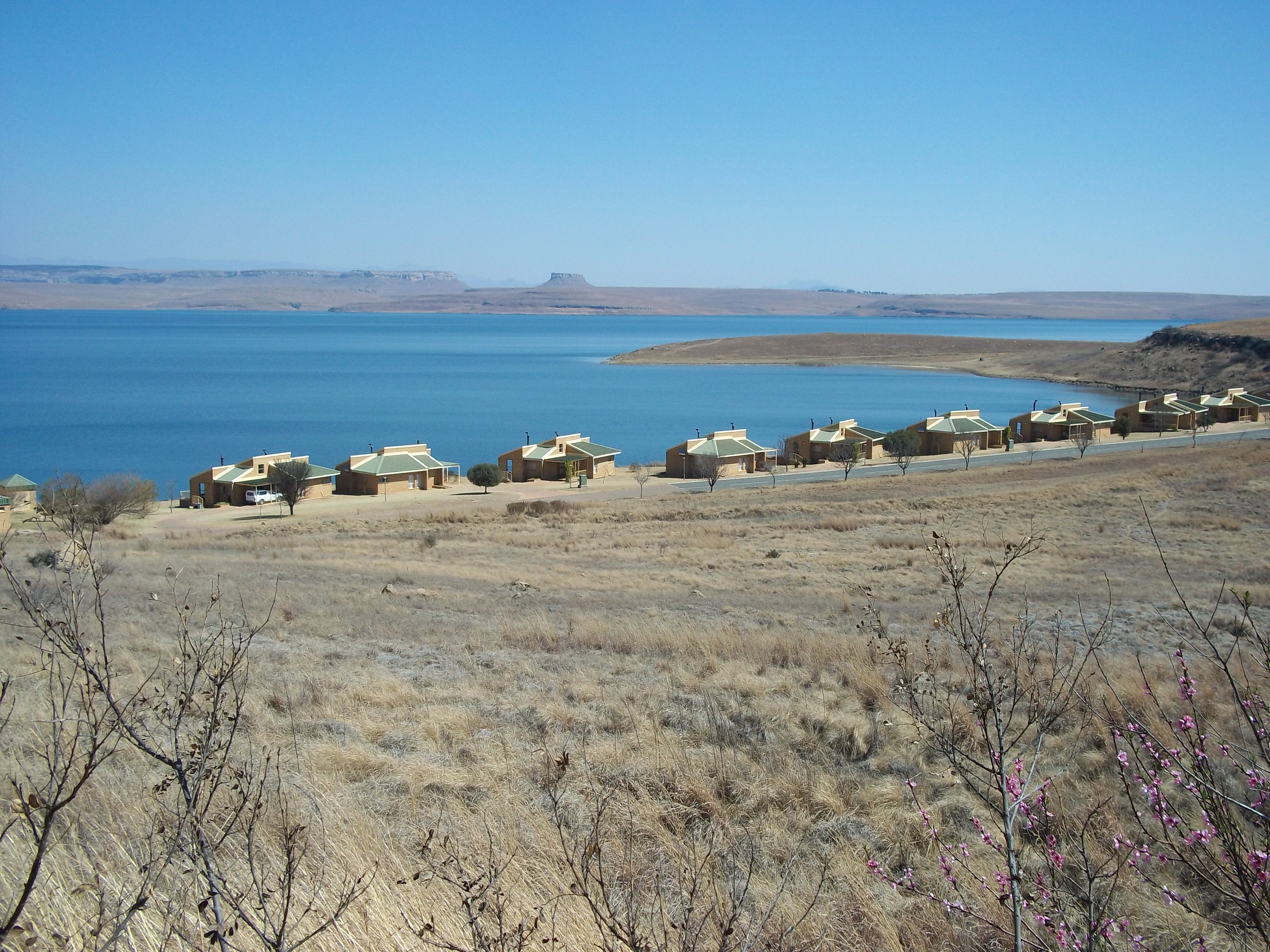
A campsite with chalets at the water's edge of the Sterkfontein Dam reservoir within the reserve. Note the dry conditions (conducive to bush fires) in the wintertime.

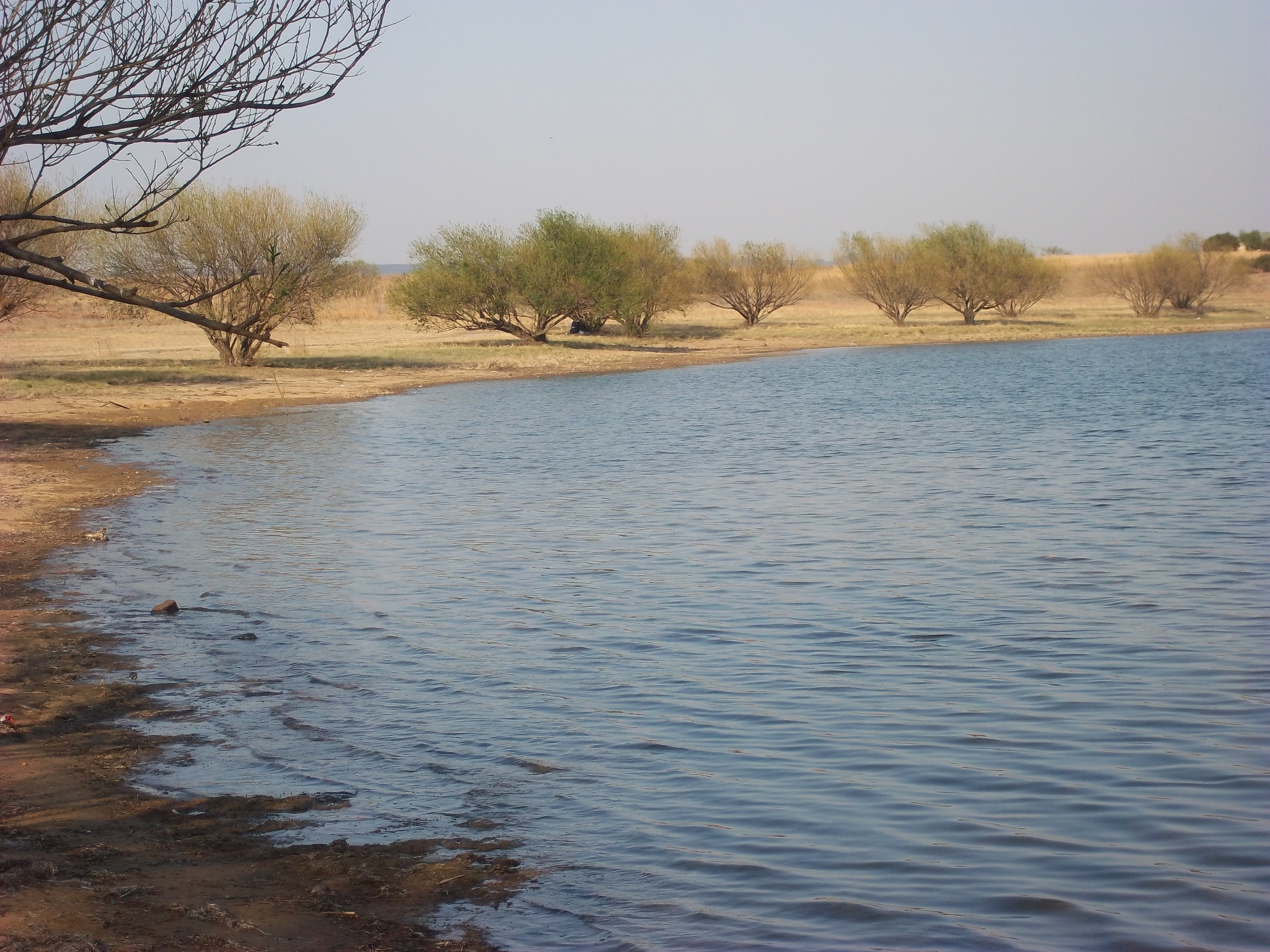
Camping area at the water's edge.

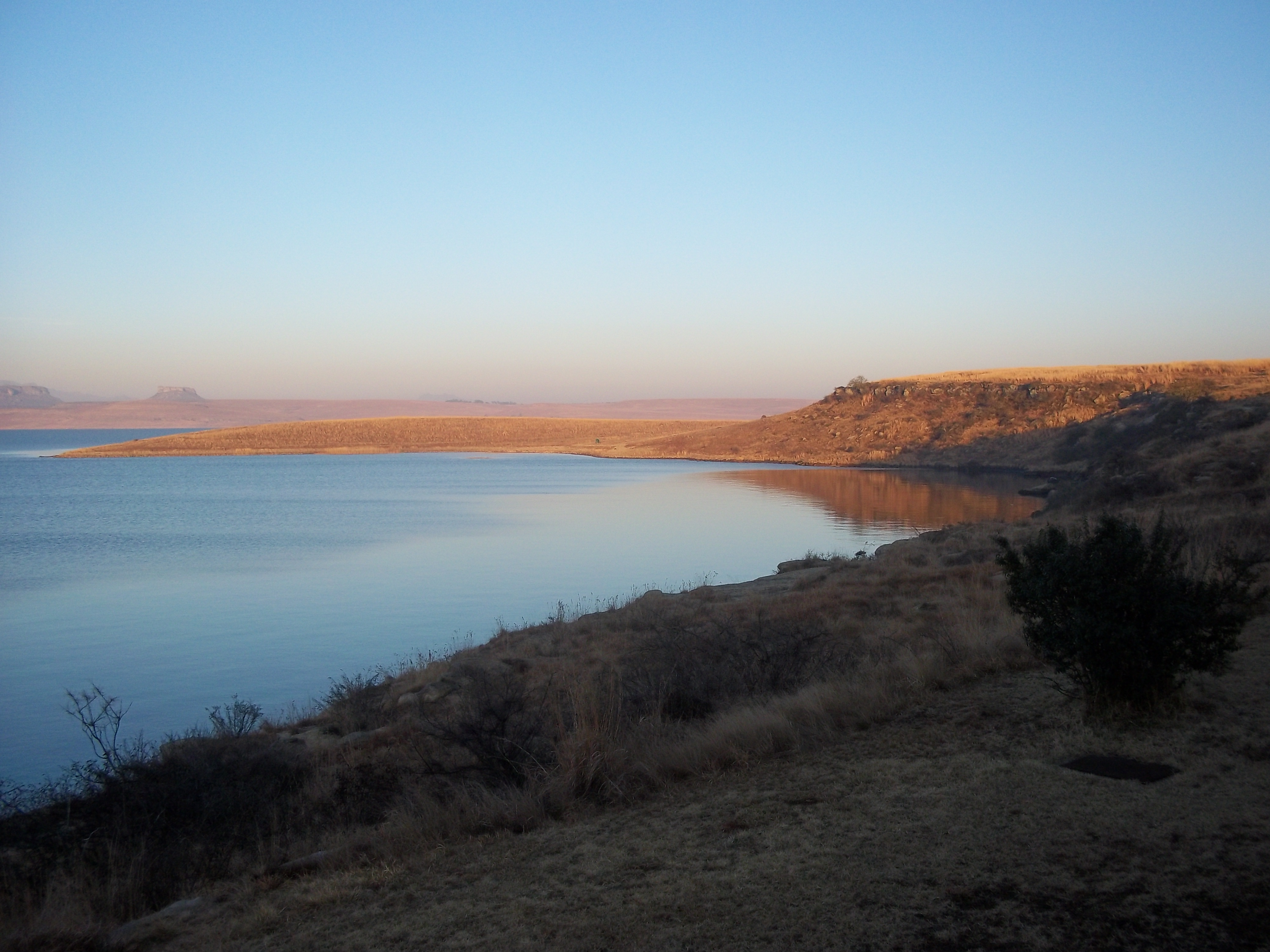
An early morning view of the Sterkfontein Dam reservoir and surroundings from the campsite in the nature reserve.

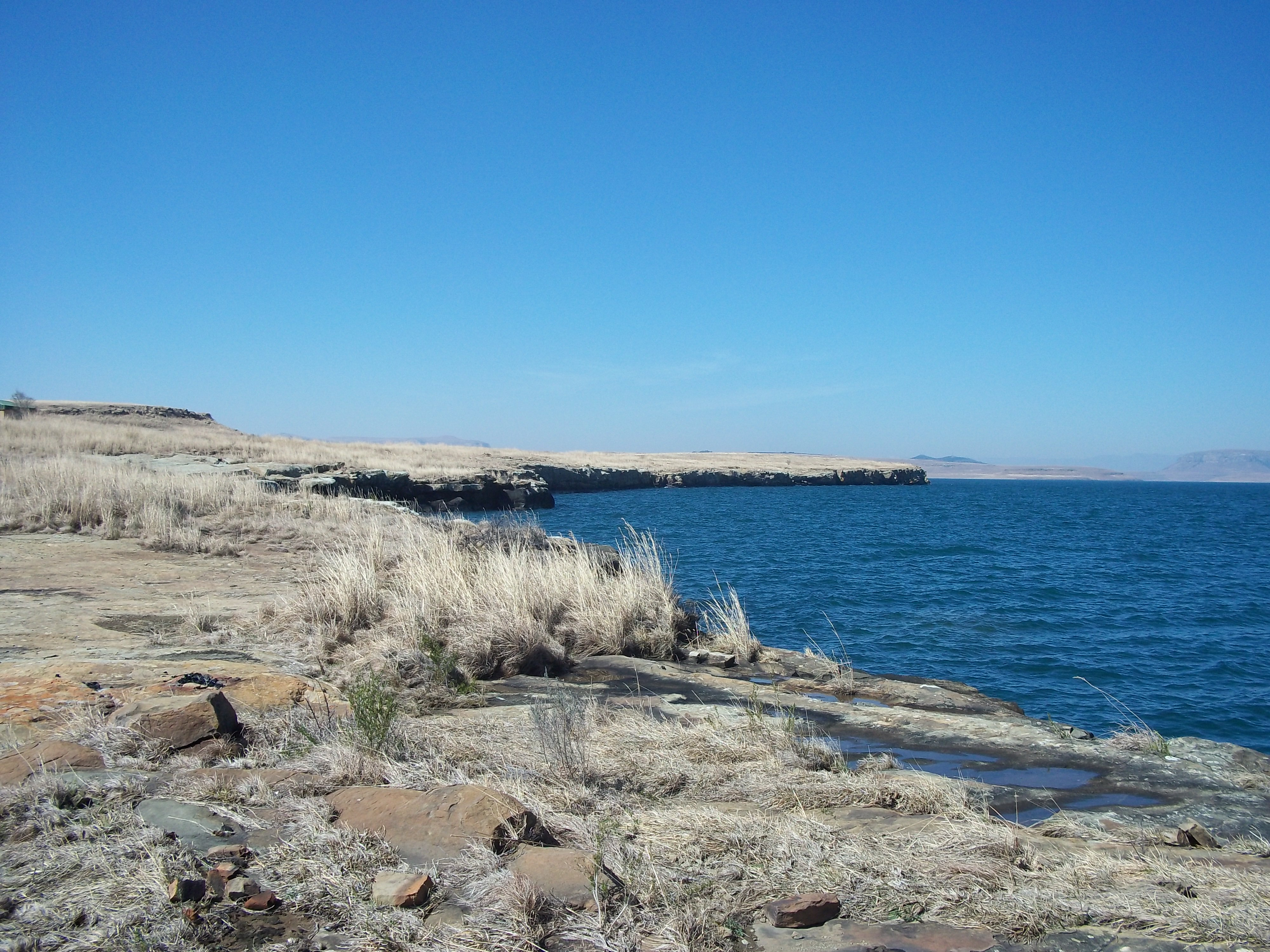
A view of the camping area by the shores of the reservoir in the Sterkfontein Dam Nature Reserve

== Notes ==
This park will be included into the Maloti-Drakensberg Transfrontier Conservation Area, Peace Park.
