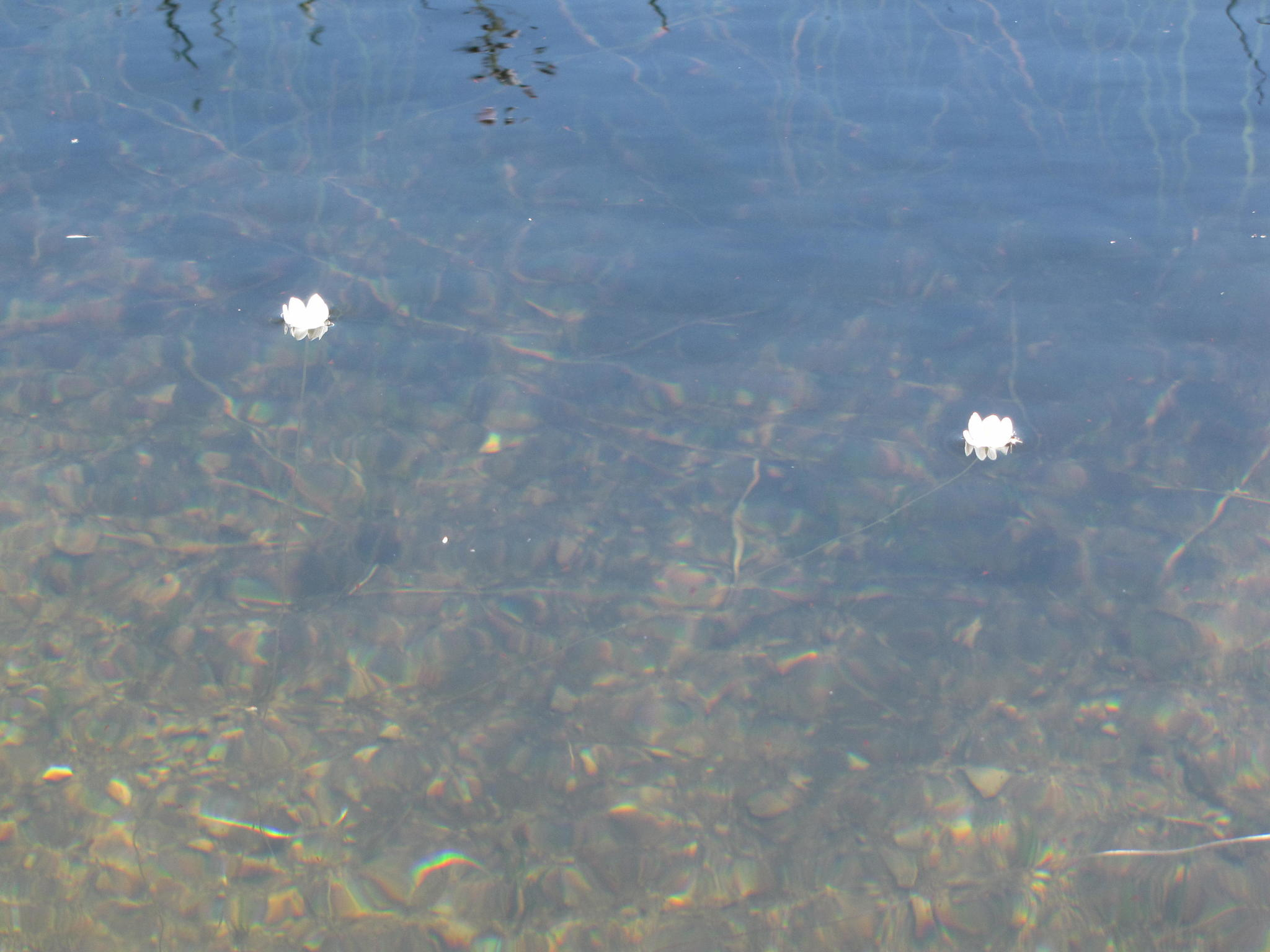

Conservation status
- Endangered (IUCN 3.1)

Scientific classification
- Kingdom: Plantae
- Clade: Tracheophytes
- Clade: Angiosperms
- Clade: Monocots
- Order: Alismatales
- Family: Aponogetonaceae
- Genus: Aponogeton
- Species: A. ranunculiflorus

Binomial name
- Aponogeton ranunculiflorus Jacot Guill. & Marais, 1972

= Aponogeton ranunculiflorus =

Sehlabathebe water lily

Species of aquatic plant

Aponogeton ranunculiflorus, the Sehlabathebe water lily, is a tiny and endangered species of aquatic plant, that belongs to the pondweed family Aponogetonaceae. It is protected in the Sehlabathebe National Park in the mountains of Lesotho, where it is very localised, and nearby in the uKhahlamba / Drakensberg Park of KwaZulu-Natal, South Africa. Outside these areas it is seriously threatened. It is found in sandstone rock pools, up to 7 metres deep, and in permanently wet tarns or sensitive high altitude mires, at altitudes between about 2,600 and 3,200 metres. Its spiralled stems allow the flowers to remain at surface level. Threats to the species include overgrazing and trampling by cattle, overburning, erosion and subsistence farming. Their small (1 cm) corms can survive the drying out of the pools, or being frozen into the muddy bottoms.
