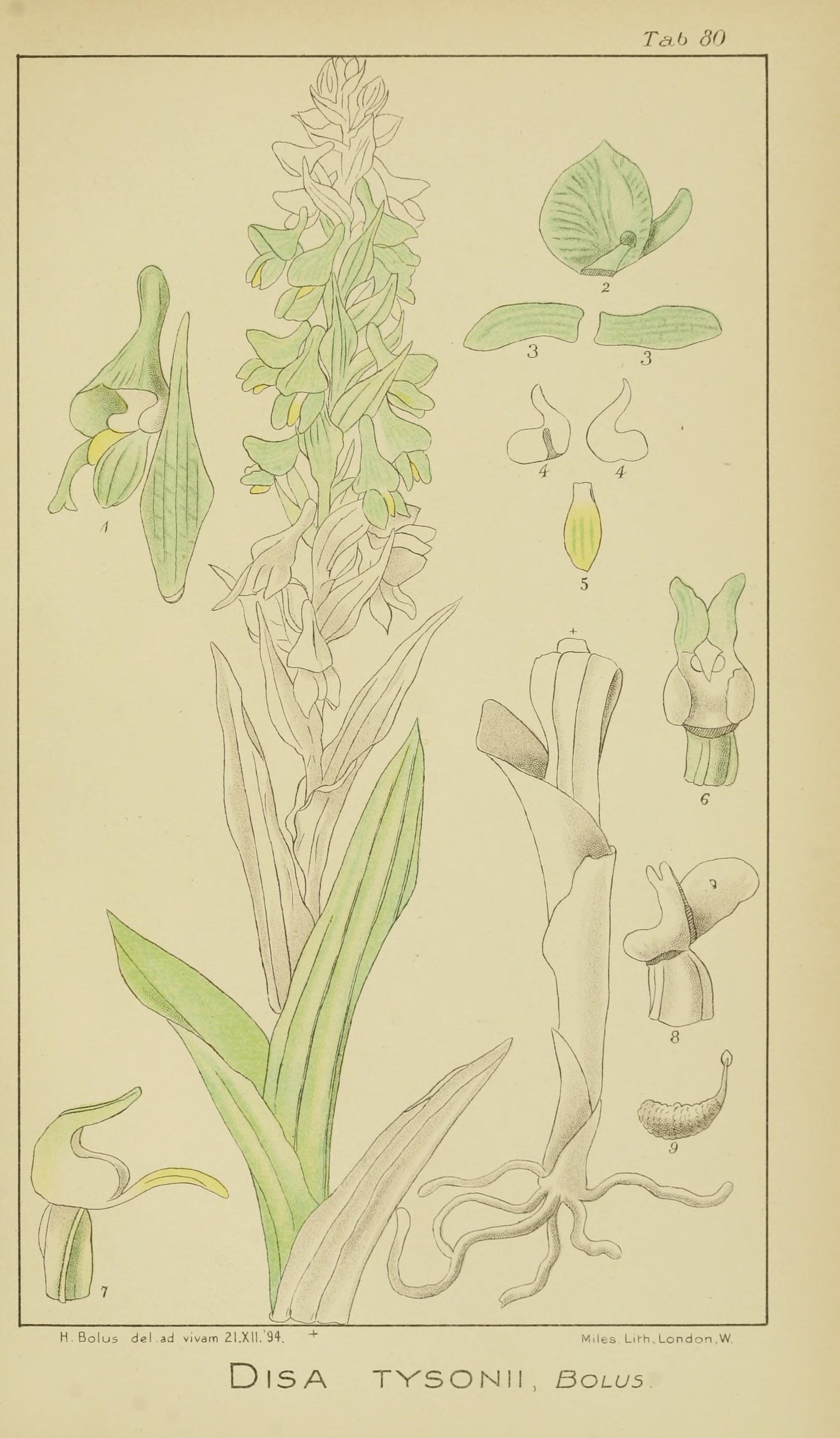

Scientific classification
- Kingdom: Plantae
- Clade: Tracheophytes
- Clade: Angiosperms
- Clade: Monocots
- Order: Asparagales
- Family: Orchidaceae
- Subfamily: Orchidoideae
- Genus: Disa
- Species: D. tysonii

Binomial name
- Disa tysonii Bolus

= Disa tysonii =

Species of flowering plant

Disa tysonii is a perennial plant and geophyte belonging to the genus Disa. The plant is native to KwaZulu-Natal, Lesotho and the Eastern Cape. The species occurs at Underberg, Ts'ehlanyane Valley in Lesotho, Hogsback, Dohnepiek and Port St. Johns in the Indian Ocean coastal belt and grasslands at altitudes of 100 to 3000 m. In the Hogsback area, forestry activities are a threat. The plant is considered rare.
