= Eupithecia maloti =

Scientific classification
- Kingdom: Animalia
- Phylum: Arthropoda
- Clade: Pancrustacea
- Class: Insecta
- Order: Lepidoptera
- Family: Geometridae
- Genus: Eupithecia
- Species: E. maloti

Binomial name
- Eupithecia maloti Krüger, 1999/2000

Species of moth

Eupithecia maloti is a moth in the family Geometridae. It is found in Lesotho. It is named after the Maloti Mountains.

The forewing length is 11 mm (0.43 in) for the holotype, a male.
