= Ohrigstad Dam Nature Reserve =

- Location of the park
- Location: Mpumalanga, South Africa
- Coordinates: 24.955°S 30.634°E
- Area: 25.6069 km^{2} (9.8869 sq mi)
- Established: 22 September 1954; 71 years ago
- Ohrigstad Dam Nature Reserve (South Africa)

Ohrigstad Dam Nature Reserve Mpumalanga, Situated on the edge of the highveld plateau, the reserve covers an area of 2,400 ha around the dam which impounds a stretch of the Ohrigstad River.

== Biodiversity ==
The near threatened grey rhebok is thought to be locally extinct in the reserve; it has not been seen since 2013.
