= Bokong Nature Reserve =

Nature reserve in Lesotho

- Coordinates: 29.069°S 28.425°E
- Governing body: Lesotho Northern Parks
- Website: https://environment.gov.ls/protected-places/bokong-nature-reserve/
- Bokong Nature Reserve (Lesotho)

The Bokong Nature Reserve is a reserve located in Lesotho. It contains Afro-alpine wetlands at the sources of the Bokong and Lepaqoa rivers, plus montane grassland and patches of heathland boulder beds, both of which are regular haunts for Vaal rhebuck. The reserve's highlight, however, is the Lepaqoa Waterfall, which freezes in winter to form a column of ice.

The reserve's entrance is next to the visitors' centre, signposted left off the highway beyond the Mafika Lisiu Pass. Perched on the edge of a cliff overlooking the Lepaqoa Valley, the visitor centre has a picnic site and interpretative trail to the top of the Lepaqoa Falls, as well as guides and horses for hire. There is also a two- to three-day hike along the alpine plateau to Ts'ehlanyane National Park to the north. Camping is possible throughout the reserve, and there are also two stone-and-thatch rondavels close to the falls.

Bokong is a picturesque hiker-friendly reserve at altitudes of 2800 to 3200 metres.
