= Wild rhubarb =

Wild rhubarb may refer to several different plants:

- Arctium minus, native to Europe, in family Asteraceae
- Ipomoea pandurata, herbaceous perennial vine named to North America, in family Convolvulaceae
- Heracleum mantegazzianum, a toxic plant native to central Asia, in family Apiaceae
- Rumex hymenosepalus, native to North America, in family Polygonaceae
- Polygonum alaskanum, native to Alaska, in family Polygonaceae
