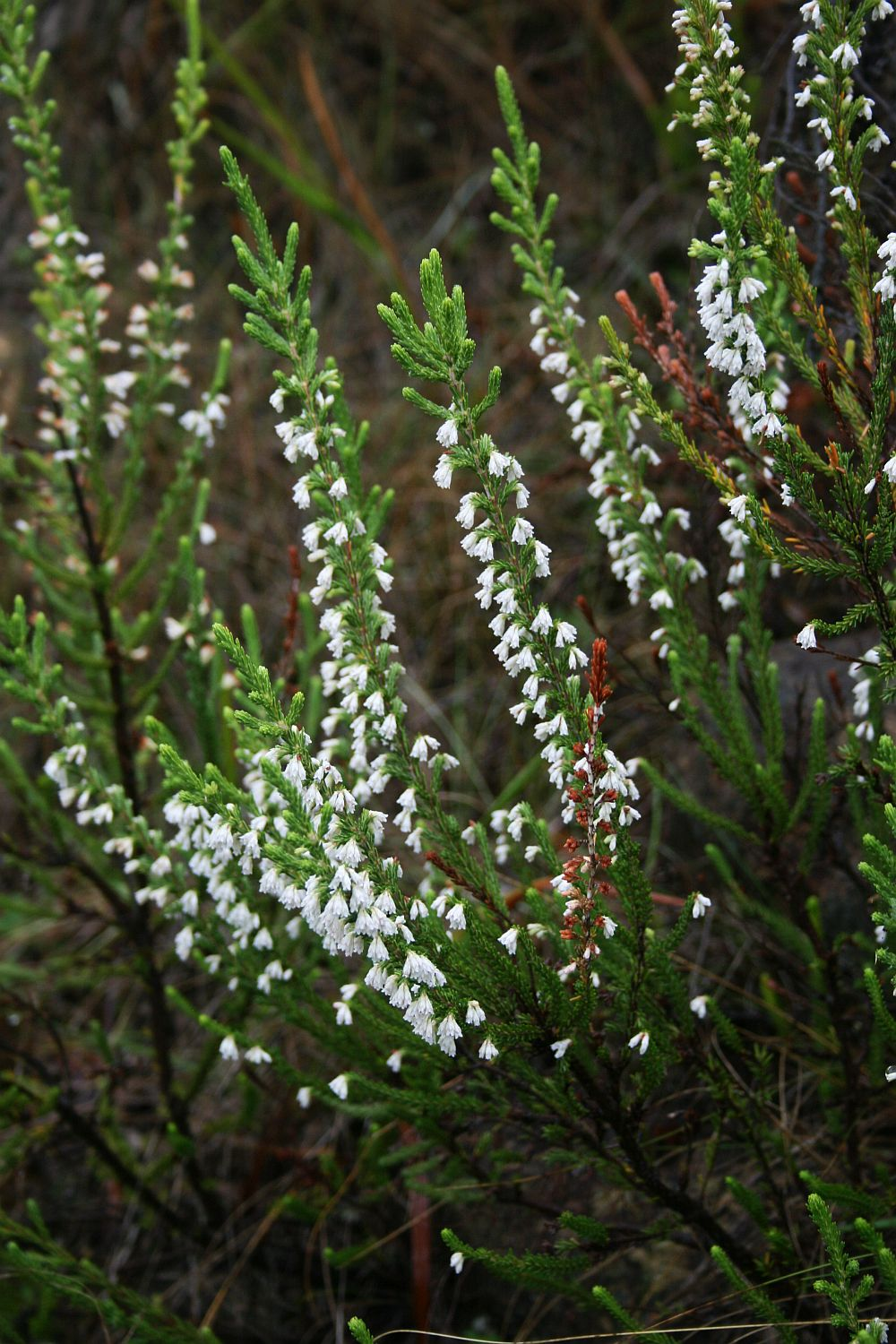

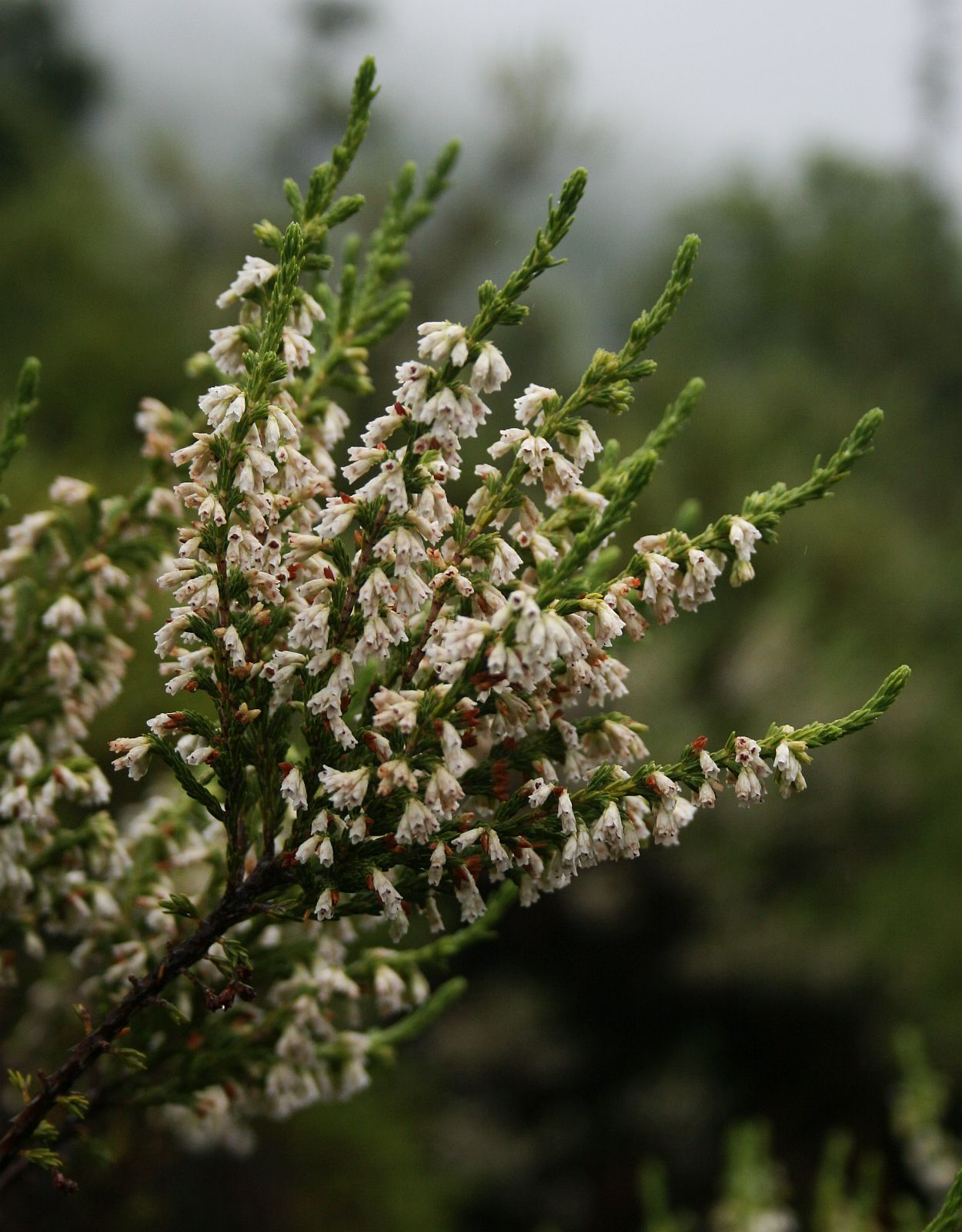

Scientific classification
- Kingdom: Plantae
- Clade: Tracheophytes
- Clade: Angiosperms
- Clade: Eudicots
- Clade: Asterids
- Order: Ericales
- Family: Ericaceae
- Genus: Erica
- Species: E. afrorum

Binomial name
- Erica afrorum Bolus

= Erica afrorum =

Species of flowering plant

Erica afrorum, also known as Erica caffrorum, and known by its common name mountain tree erica, is a plant belonging to the genus Erica. The species is native to KwaZulu-Natal, Mpumalanga, Lesotho, Eastern Cape and the Free State.
