= Disa thodei =

Conservation status
- Least Concern (IUCN 3.1)

Scientific classification
- Kingdom: Plantae
- Clade: Tracheophytes
- Clade: Angiosperms
- Clade: Monocots
- Order: Asparagales
- Family: Orchidaceae
- Subfamily: Orchidoideae
- Genus: Disa
- Species: D. thodei

Binomial name
- Disa thodei Schltr. ex Kraenzl.

Species of flowering plant

Disa thodei is a perennial plant and geophyte belonging to the genus Disa. The plant is native to KwaZulu-Natal, Lesotho, Eastern Cape and the Free State.
