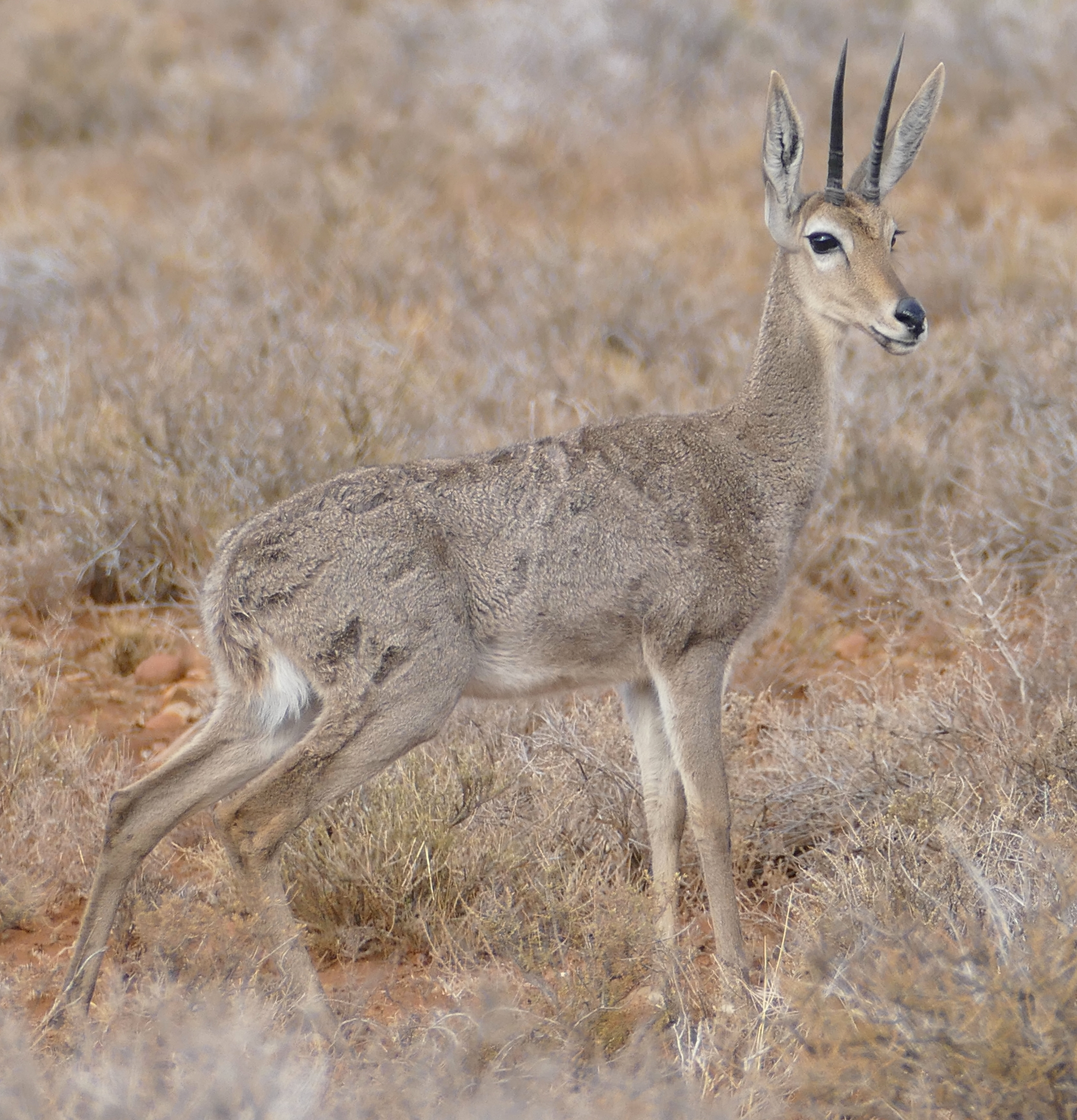
- A male at the Karoo National Park in the Western Cape, South Africa

Conservation status
- Near Threatened (IUCN 3.1)

Scientific classification
- Kingdom: Animalia
- Phylum: Chordata
- Class: Mammalia
- Order: Artiodactyla
- Family: Bovidae
- Subfamily: Reduncinae
- Genus: Pelea; Gray, 1851
- Species: P. capreolus

Binomial name
- Pelea capreolus (Forster, 1790)
- native range, IUCN (2016)

= Grey rhebok =

Species of mammal

The grey rhebok (Pelea capreolus), locally known as the vaalribbok in Afrikaans, is a species of antelope native to South Africa, Lesotho, and Eswatini. The specific name capreolus is Latin for 'little goat'.

== Description ==
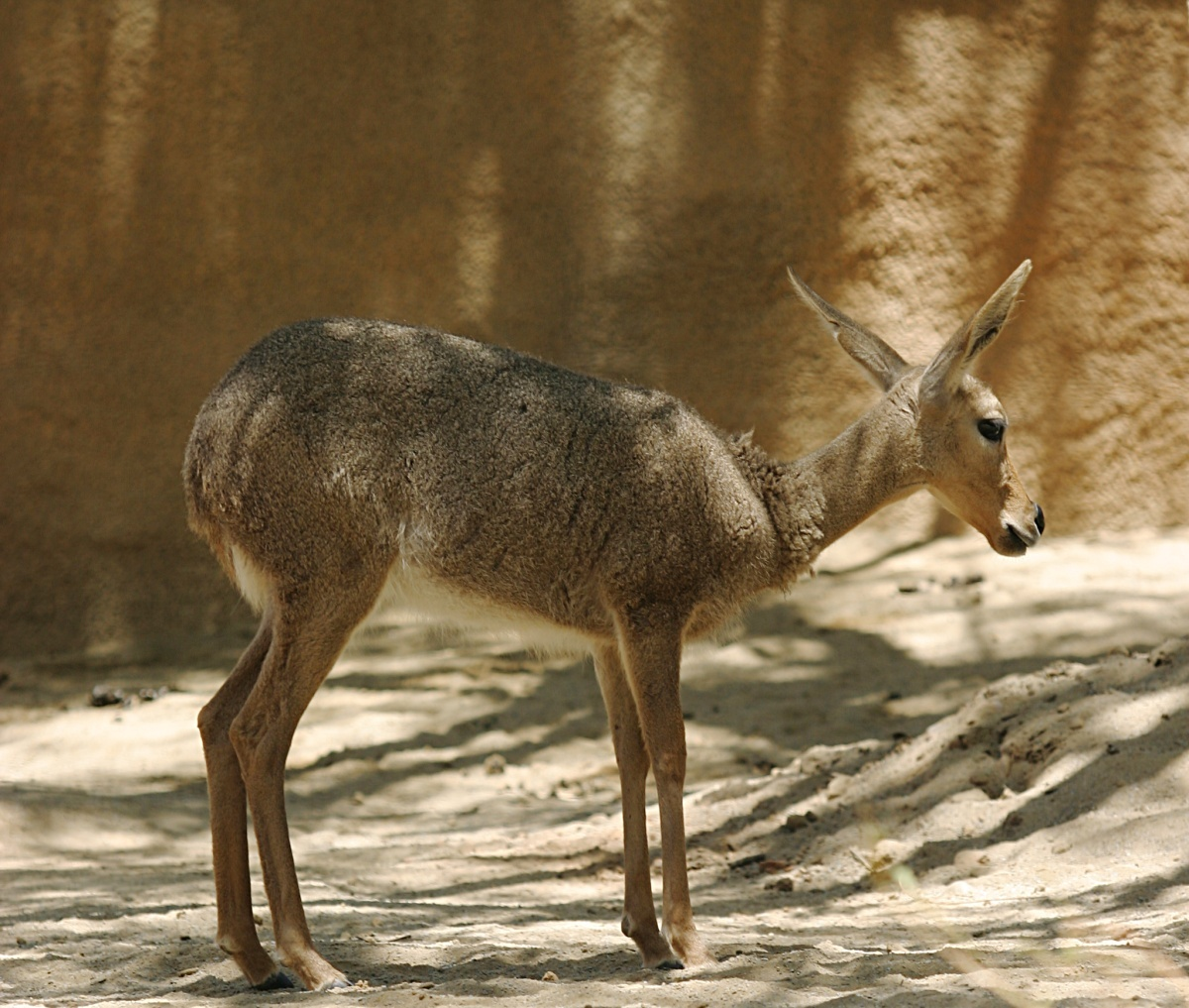
A female at the San Diego Zoo

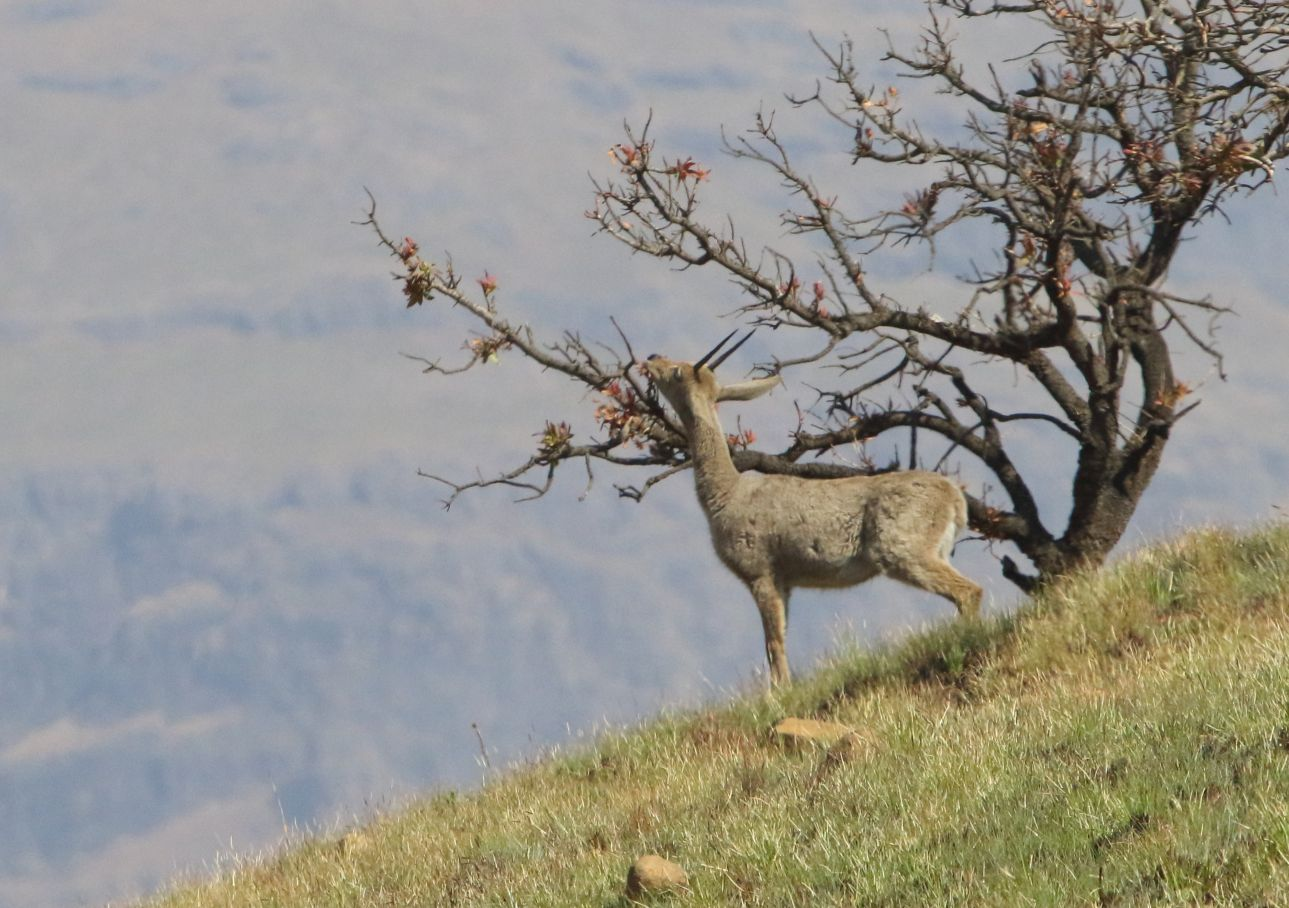
Male grey rhebok browsing

The grey rhebok is a medium-sized antelope weighing 19–30 kilograms (42–66 lb) with a long neck and narrow ears. The coat is short and dense and coloured in various shades of grey. Only the males carry horns, which are straight, sharp, ringed at the base, and around 15–25 centimetres (5.9–9.8 in) long.

== Distribution and habitat ==
Generally confined to the higher areas of Southern Africa, they typically inhabit grassy, montane habitats - for example, sourveld - usually 1,000 metres (3,300 ft) above sea level, and carry a woolly grey coat to insulate them from the cold. They are not strictly limited to this habitat as they can be found in the coastal belt of the Cape, almost at sea level.

== Reproduction and behaviour ==
The grey rhebok is territorial and maintains its territory by urinating and defecating, standing or walking in an upright posture, and patrolling. Males become extremely aggressive during the breeding season. The grey rhebok usually aggregates in herds of one to 15 females and young and one mature male. This species is therefore polygynous. The grey rhebok is a seasonal breeder.

This species is a browser, and gets most of its water from the food it eats, so it can utilise food sources a long distance from standing water.

== Conservation status ==
The grey rhebok is listed as Near Threatened due to a 20% decline over 3 generations of its subpopulations in 13 protected areas, from 1999 to 2014; the largest protected subpopulation in the Maloti-Drakensberg Park lost an estimated 15-20% of its population. Population records also support anecdotal reports of decline or local extinctions in the North West, Western Cape, Northern Cape and Mpumalanga provinces, as well as the Lesotho Highlands. The grey rhebok hasn't been sighted in the Ohrigstad Dam Nature Reserve since 2013.

== In contemporary culture ==
The Afrikaans spelling of the species, reebok, lends its name to the British-American sportswear manufacturing company Reebok. In 1958, Reebok founder Joseph William Foster found the name in US Webster's New School and Office Dictionary.
