= UKhahlamba-Drakensberg Park =

Part of a world heritage site in KwaZulu-Natal, South Africa

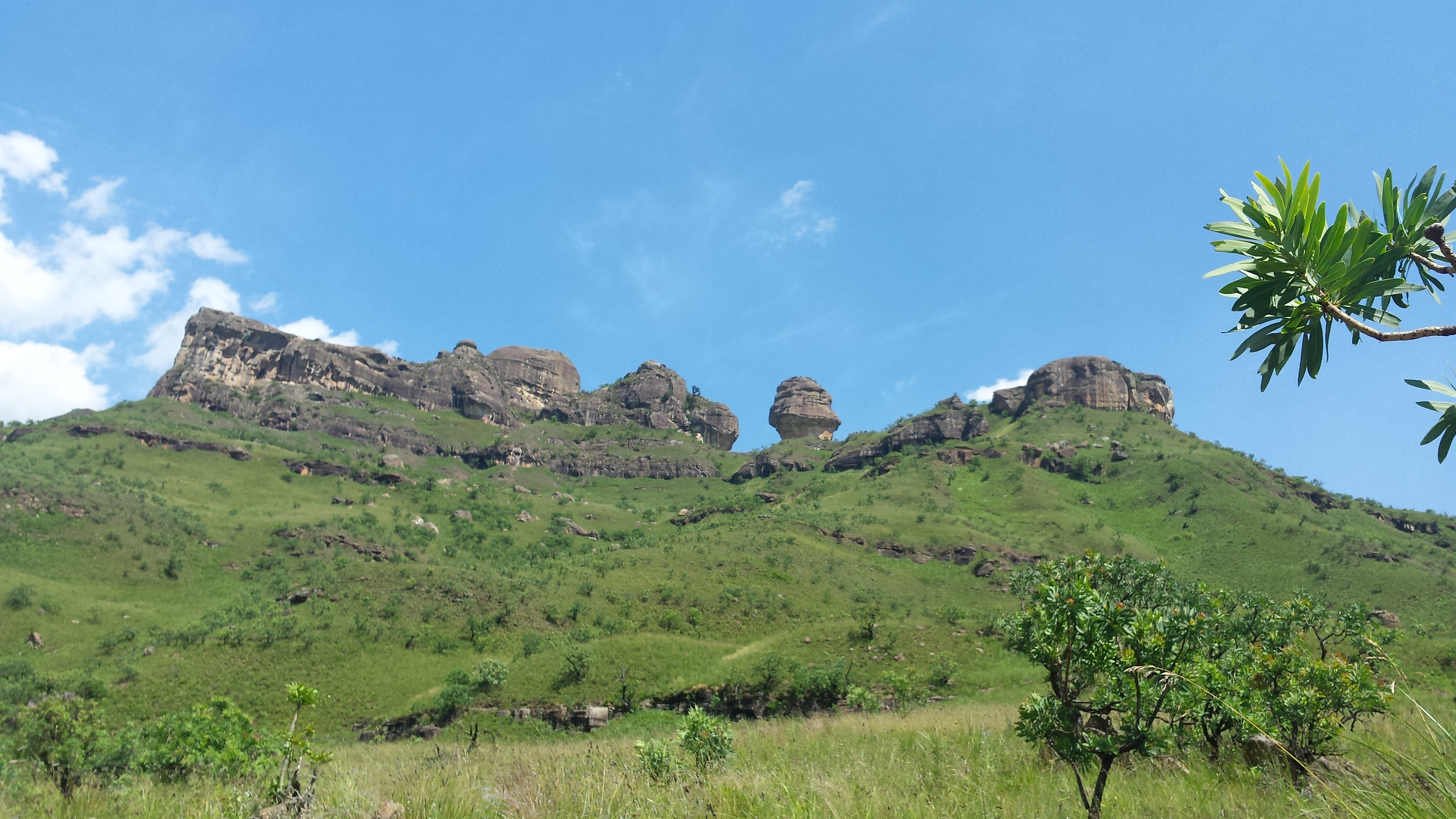
- Tugela Gorge in the Royal Natal National Park area of the park.
- Location of UKhahlamba-Drakensberg Park near the border of Lesotho
- Location: KwaZulu-Natal, South Africa
- Coordinates: 29°23′00″S 29°32′26″E
- Area: 2,429.13 km^{2} (937.89 sq mi)

Ramsar Wetland
- Official name: Natal Drakensberg Park
- Designated: 21 January 1997
- Reference no.: 886
- UKhahlamba-Drakensberg Park (South Africa)

The uKhahlamba-Drakensberg Park is a protected area in the KwaZulu-Natal province of South Africa, covering 2,428.13 km^{2} (938 sq mi), and is part of the Maloti-Drakensberg Park, a UNESCO World Heritage Site. The park includes Royal Natal National Park, a Provincial park, and covers part of the Drakensberg, an escarpment formation with the highest elevations in southern Africa.

The park and the adjoining Sehlabathebe National Park in the Kingdom of Lesotho are part of the Maloti-Drakensberg Park, which was first declared a World Heritage Site on 30 November 2000. It is described by UNESCO as having "exceptional natural beauty in its soaring basaltic buttresses, incisive dramatic cutbacks, and golden sandstone ramparts... the site’s diversity of habitats protects a high level of endemic and globally threatened species, especially birds and plants... [and it] also contains many caves and rock-shelters with the largest and most concentrated group of paintings in Africa south of the Sahara". The paintings mentioned are parietal art, some of which may date to 40,000 to 100,000 years ago.

Plans to boost tourism in the area include a cable car project by the KZN Economic Development, Tourism, and Environmental Affairs Department.

== Fauna ==
The Drakensberg area is characterised by a high level of endemism of both vertebrates and invertebrates.

== Conservation ==
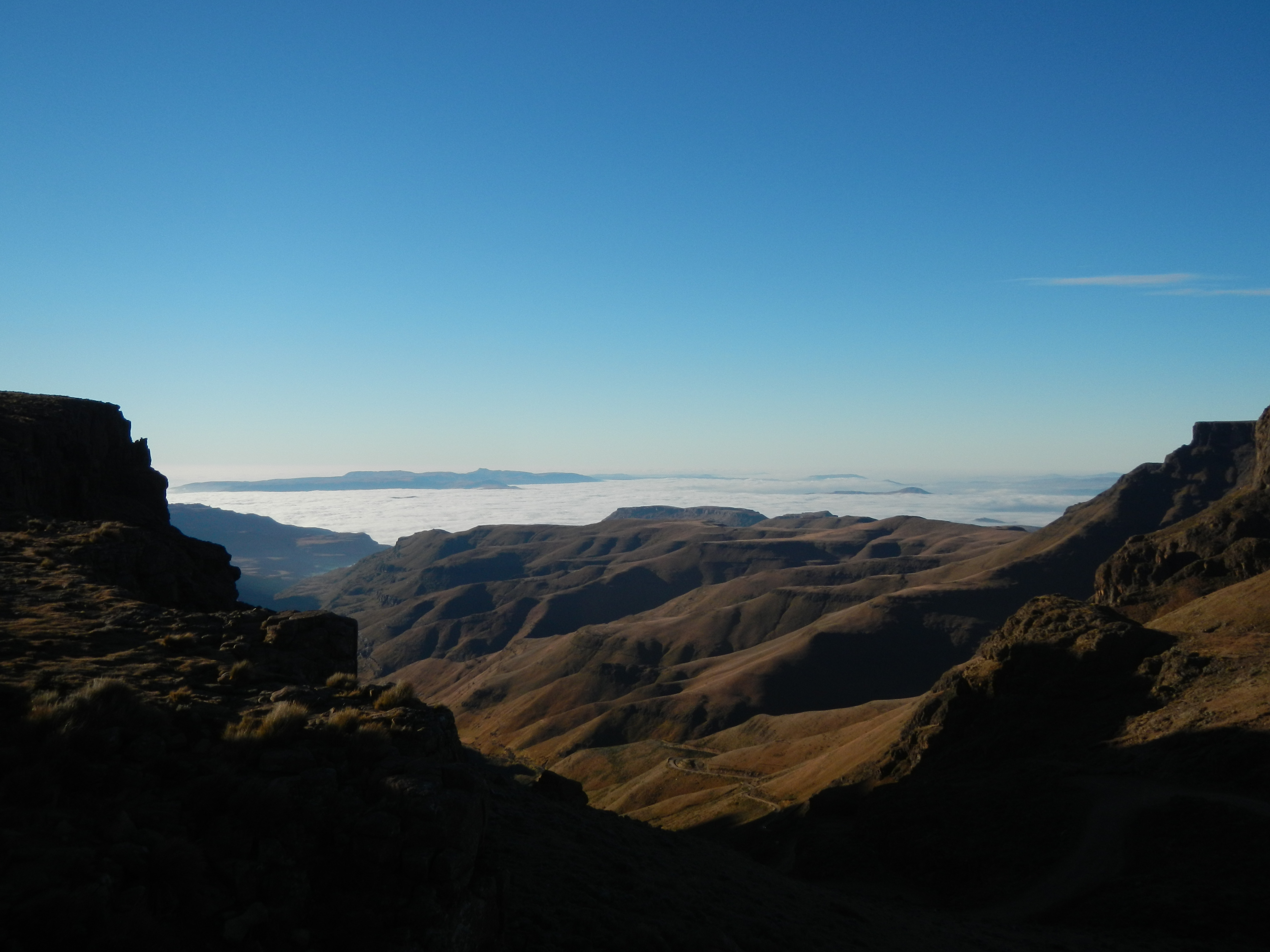
Mkhomazi Wilderness Area

Most of the higher South African parts of the Drakensberg escarpment formation have been designated as game reserves or wilderness areas. The uKhahlamba-Drakensberg Park is also in the List of Wetlands of International Importance (under the Ramsar Convention). Adjacent to the park is the Cathkin Estates Conservation and Wildlife Sanctuary, which spans 10.44 km^{2} (4.03 sq mi) of virgin grassland and represents the largest privately owned game park in the KwaZulu-Natal Drakensberg region.

Wilderness areas include Mkhomazi, Upper Mkhomazi, Mlambonja, Mdedelelo, and Mzimkhulu. Mkhomazi Wilderness Area is a region of deserted badlands in the Drakensberg, lying between the Giant's Castle and the Sani Pass.
