= Sehlabathebe National Park =

National park of Lesotho

- IUCN category IV (habitat/species management area)
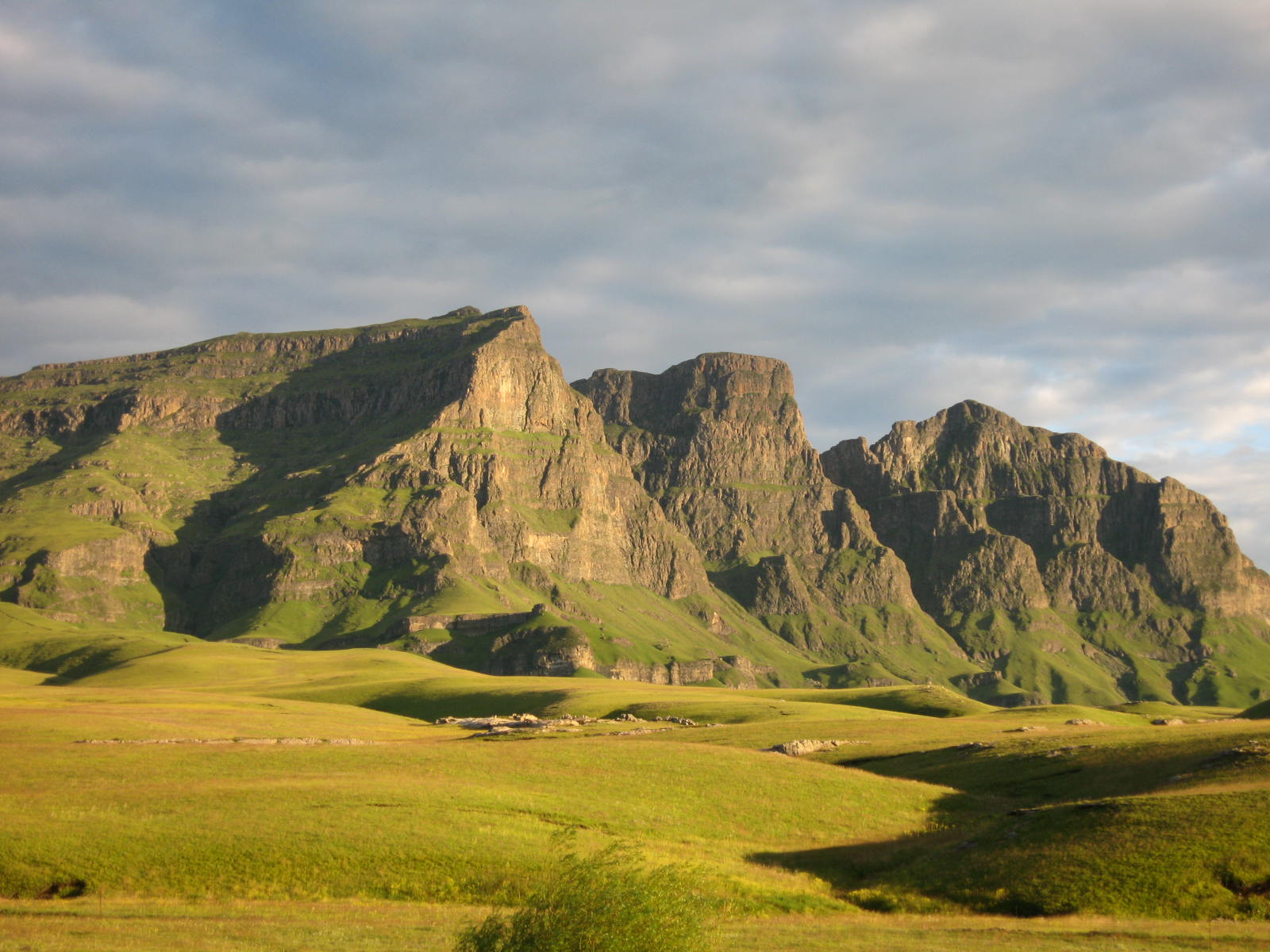
- Map of Lesotho
- Location: Qacha's Nek District, Lesotho
- Nearest city: Sehlabathede
- Coordinates: 29°53′56″S 29°07′16″E
- Area: 69.5 km^{2} (26.8 mi^{2})
- Established: 1969
- Sehlabathebe National Park (Lesotho)

The Sehlabathebe National Park (Sesotho: Pitso ea sechaba sa Sehlabathebe) is located in the Maloti Mountains in Qacha's Nek District, Lesotho and is part of the Maloti-Drakensberg World Heritage Site. The park was first established on 8 May 1969 and since then, is recognised as important in terms of biological diversity and cultural heritage. The landscape is dominated by grasslands of various types. The larger ecosystem functions provide freshwater to Lesotho, South Africa, and Namibia.

== Location ==
Sehlabathebe National Park is situated in the south-east corner of Lesotho at an average elevation of some 2,400 metres above sea level.

== Environment ==
Most of the park is taken up by a designated wilderness area, and is uninhabited. Much of it consists of cliffs, waterfalls, pools, rock dwellings and rock art. It is known for its scenery with unique rock formations. The Tsoelikane waterfall is the biggest waterfall in the park. A total of 65 rock art sites have been identified in the area, as well as other forms of the previous habitation of the site.

The park contains habitats supporting a range of Afro-Alpine and Sub-Alpine plants, mammals, birds, reptiles, amphibians and fish. The site hosts 23 percent of the plant species in the whole Maluti Drakensberg area. Some of the park's species are endangered, including three vertebrates: the Maluti redfin, endangered fish, the Cape vulture and the bearded vulture. The Sehlabathebe water lily is an endangered aquatic plant.

== Recognition ==
This site was added to the UNESCO World Heritage Site Tentative List on October 8, 2008, in the Mixed (Cultural + Natural) category. Sehlabathebe is currently run under the Ministry of Tourism, Environment, and Culture jurisdiction. The park has also been recognised as an Important Bird Area (IBA) by BirdLife International.

== See also ==
- Climate Change in Lesotho
