= Maloti-Drakensberg Park =

International park in Lesotho and South Africa

UNESCO World Heritage Site
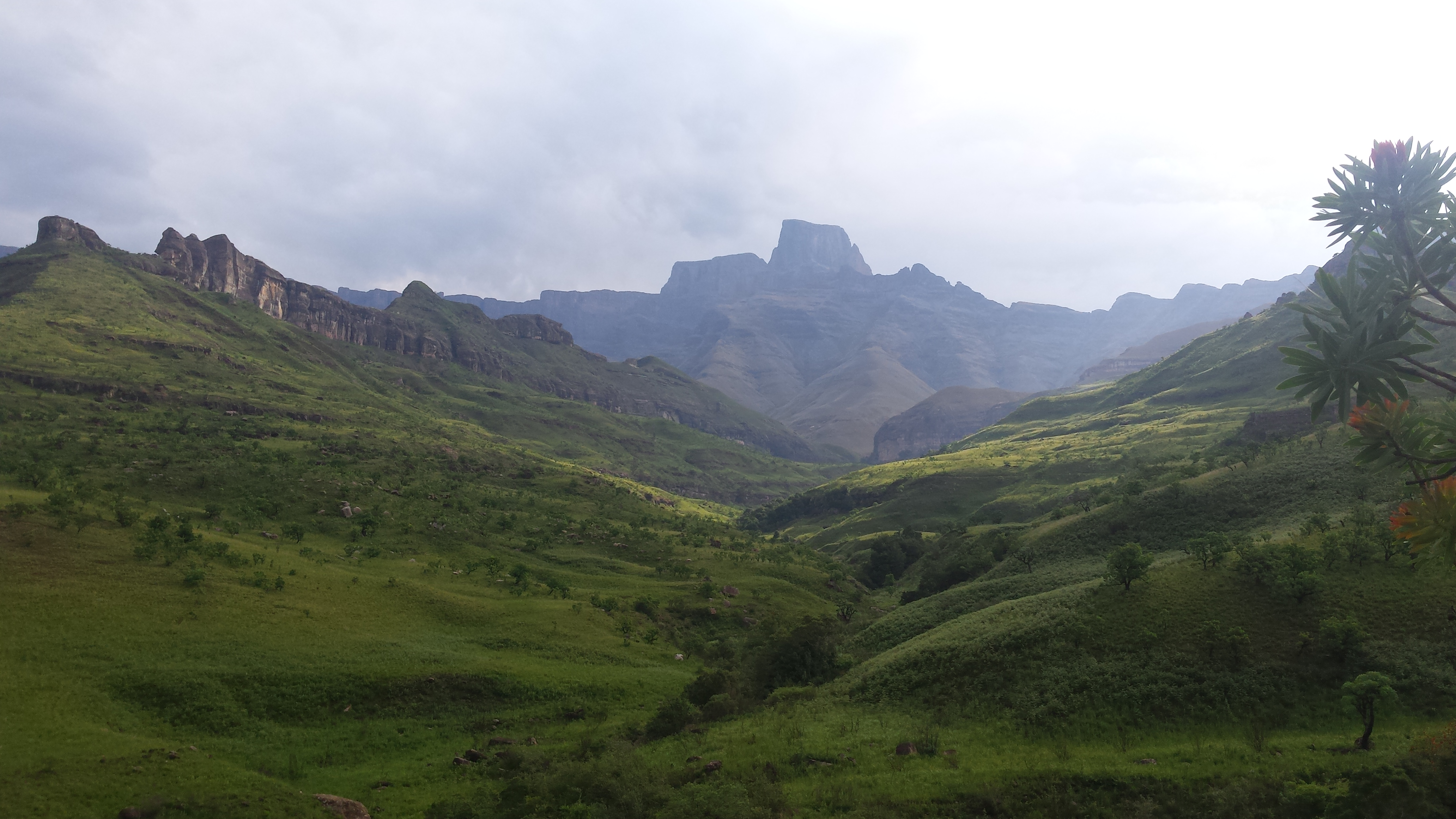
- Tugela Gorge in the Royal Natal National Park part of the Heritage Site.

- Location within Lesotho Location within South Africa
- Includes: 1. uKhahlamba Drakensberg Park (South Africa); 2. Sehlabathebe National Park (Lesotho)
- Criteria: Cultural and Natural: (i)(iii)(vii)(x)
- Reference: 985bis-001
- Inscription: 2000 (24th Session)
- Extensions: 2013
- Area: 249,313 ha (962.60 sq mi)
- Buffer zone: 46,630 ha (180.0 sq mi)
- Coordinates: 29°45′55″S 29°7′23″E

The Maloti-Drakensberg Park is a World Heritage Site, established on 11 June 2001 by linking the Sehlabathebe National Park in the Kingdom of Lesotho and the uKhahlamba Drakensberg Park in KwaZulu-Natal, South Africa. The highest peak is Thaba Ntlenyana rising to 3,482 metres.

Proposed extensions to the main park include the Golden Gate Highlands National Park, Sterkfontein Dam Nature Reserve (Free State) and Royal Natal National Park (KwaZulu-Natal) in South Africa; and the Bokong Nature Reserve and Ts'ehlanyane National Park in Lesotho.

The park is situated in the Drakensberg Mountains which form the highest areas in the sub-region, and support montane and sub-alpine ecosystems. These ecosystems have significant plant and animal biodiversity, with unique habitats and high levels of endemism. The park is also home to a gallery of rock art, with hundreds of sites and thousands of images painted by the Bushmen (San people).

The Maloti-Drakensberg Transfrontier Conservation and Development Area was conceived as a Peace park, covering about 8 113 km^{2}, consisting of 5 170 km^{2} (64%) in Lesotho and 2 943 km^{2} (36%) in KwaZulu-Natal.

== Gallery ==
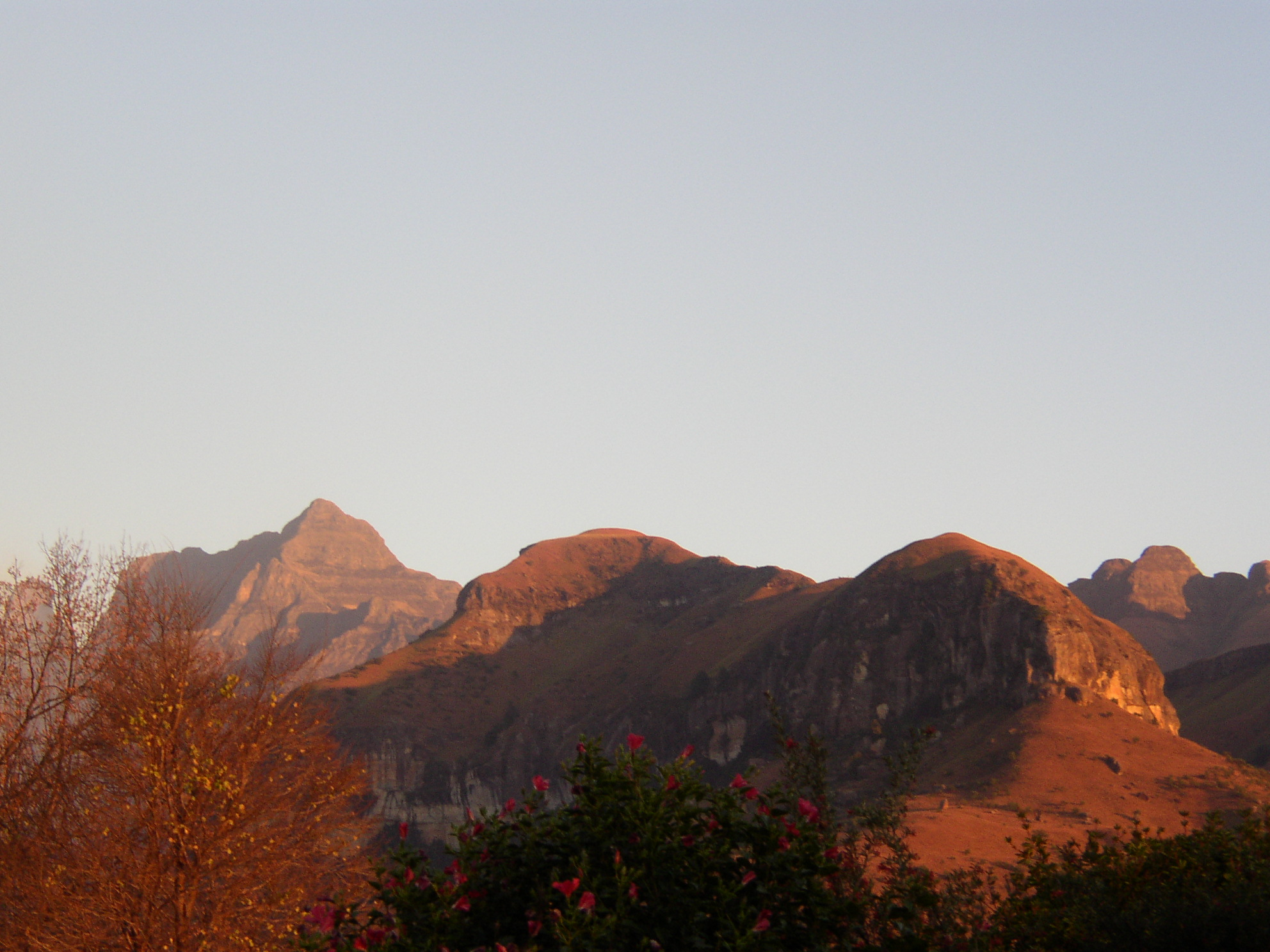
View of mountains in the evening

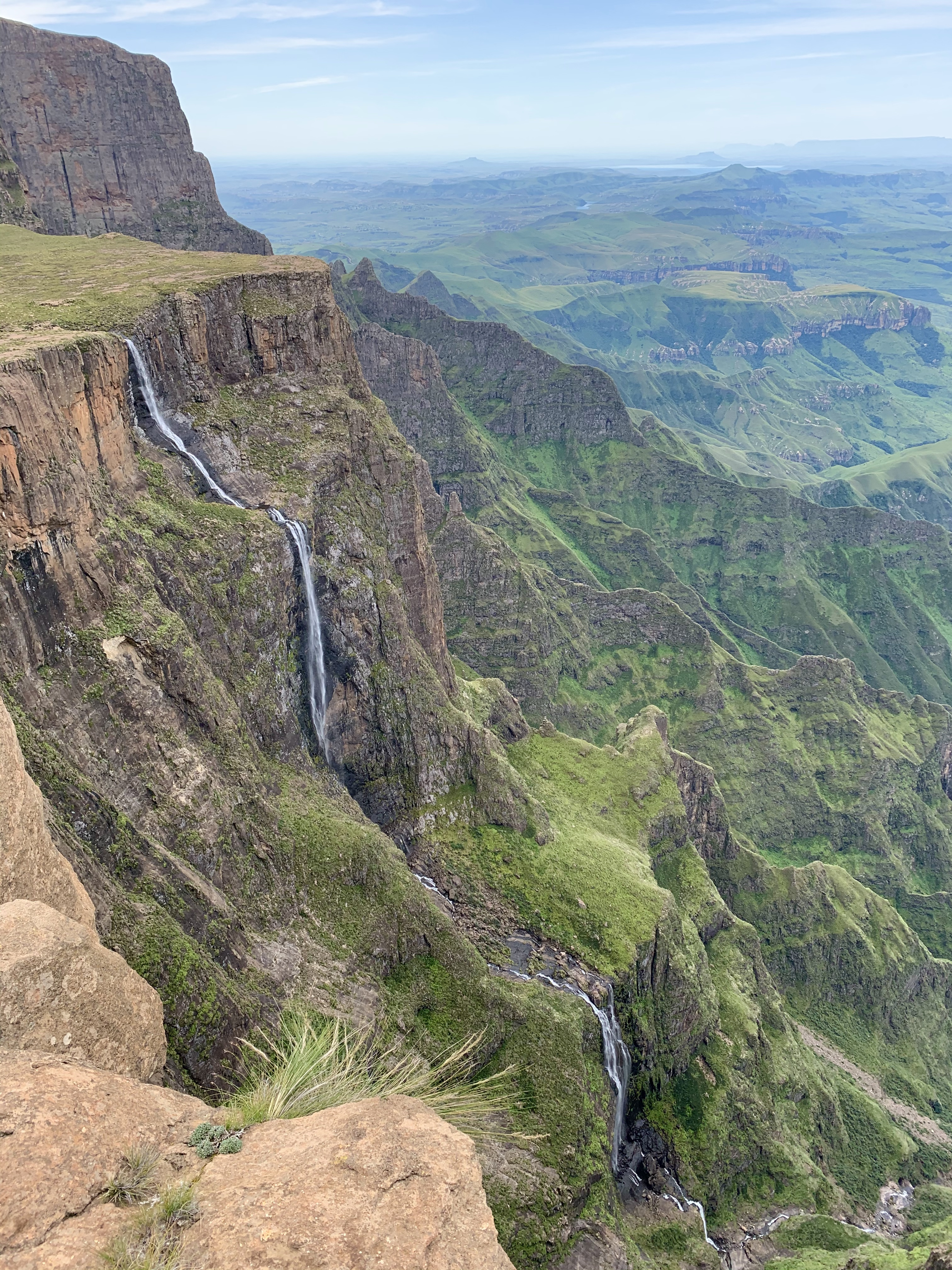
Tugela Falls

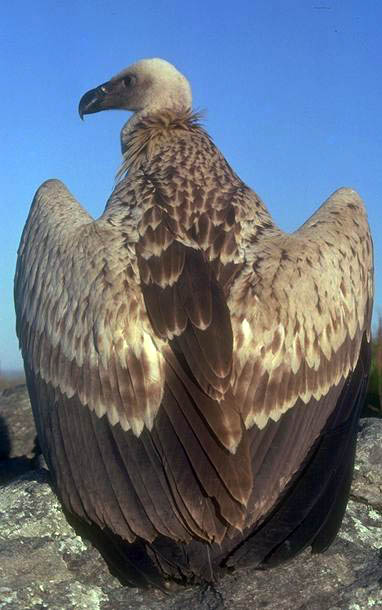
The endangered Cape vulture.

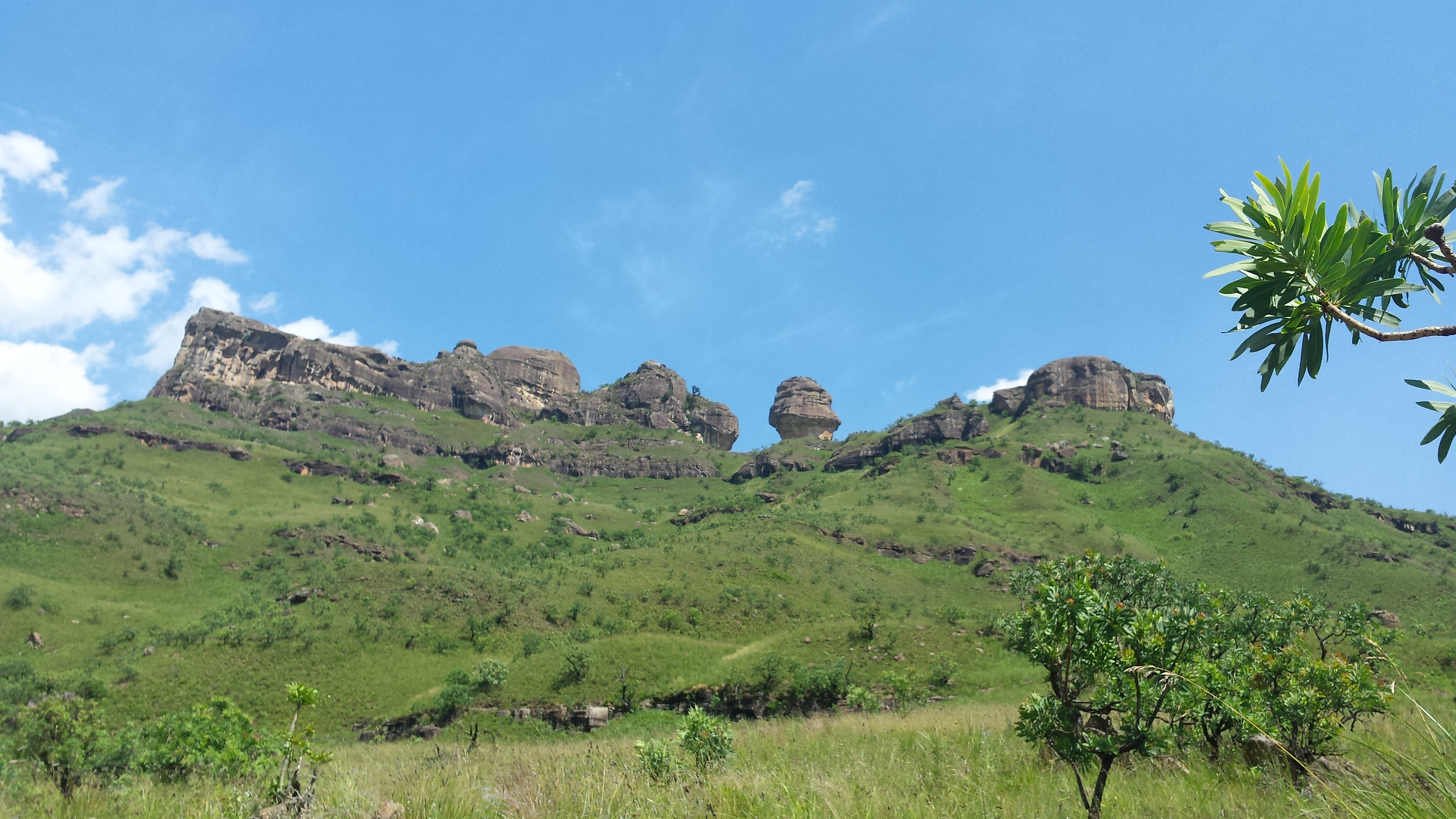
A walking trail in Tugela Gorge.

== See also ==
- List of conservation areas of South Africa
