= Tugela Falls =

Waterfalls in KwaZulu-Natal, South Africa

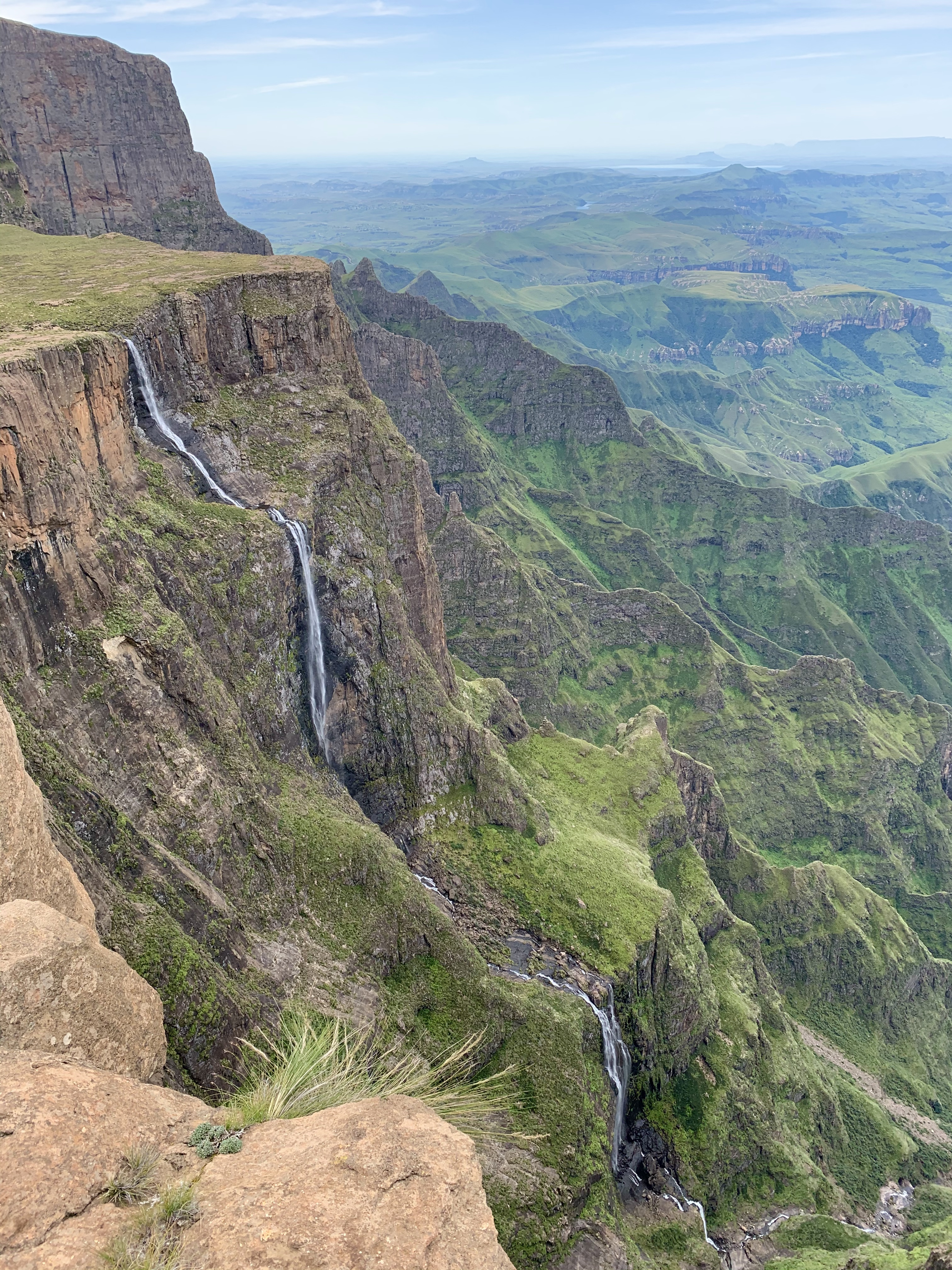
- Tugela Falls

- Location within South Africa
- Location: Royal Natal National Park, KwaZulu-Natal, South Africa
- Coordinates: 28.7522°S 28.8941°E
- Elevation: 2,972 m (9,751 ft)
- Total height: 983 m (3,225 ft)
- Number of drops: 5
- Longest drop: 411 m (1,348 ft)
- Watercourse: Tugela River
- World height ranking: 2

Tugela Falls (uThukela in Zulu) is a complex of seasonal waterfalls located in the Drakensberg (Dragon's Mountains) of Royal Natal National Park in KwaZulu-Natal Province, Republic of South Africa. According to some measurements, it is the world's tallest waterfall. A revisited validation of waterfall measurements is not available and there is still uncertainty whether Tugela or Venezuela's Angel Falls is the tallest (both measurements were taken at considerable distance from the two waterfalls).

The combined total drop of its five distinct free-leaping falls is officially 948 m (3,110 ft). In 2016, however, a Czech scientific expedition took new measurements, making the falls 983 m (3,225 ft) tall. The data were sent to the World Waterfall Database for confirmation. The source of the Tugela River (Zulu for 'sudden') is the Mont-Aux-Sources plateau, which extends several kilometres beyond the Amphitheatre escarpment from which the falls drop.

== Height controversy ==
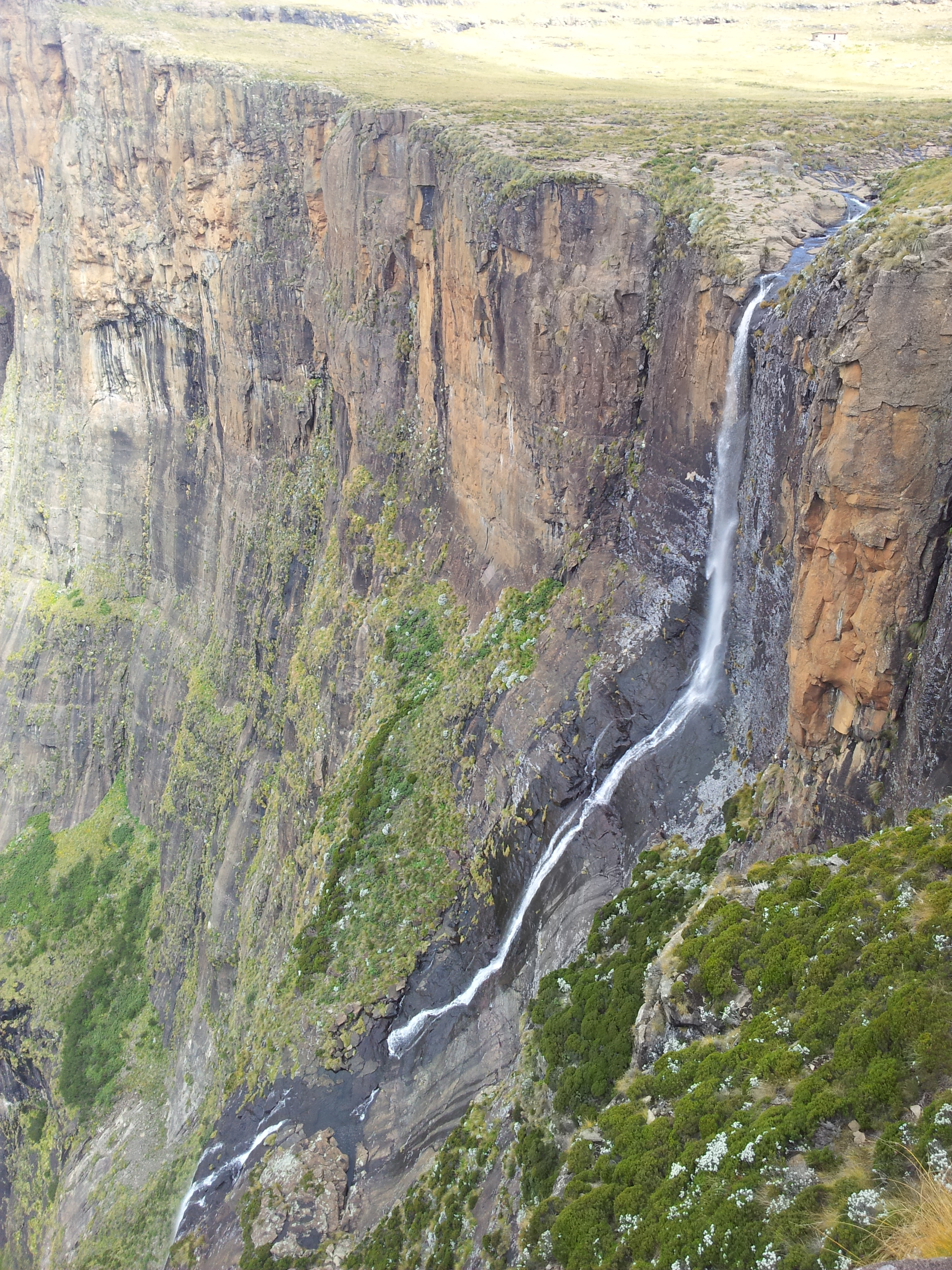
Tugela Falls as it flows off the escarpment showing the first drop and cascade

There is an argument that Tugela Falls is the tallest waterfall in the world, rather than the more commonly cited Angel Falls. This argument is based on two possible inaccuracies regarding the presumed heights of the respective falls.

First, many now believe that Angel Falls is not as tall as was claimed in the initial survey carried out by American journalist Ruth Robertson in 1949. The quoted figure of 979 m (3,212 ft) corresponds almost precisely with the difference in altitude between the top of the falls and the confluence of the Rio Gauja and the Río Churún, which is roughly 2 km (1.2 mi) away from the base of the Auyan Tepui escarpment and 1.6 km (0.99 mi) downstream from the last segment of the Rio Gauja that could possibly be considered a 'waterfall'.

The starting altitude of Angel Falls is often given as 1,500 m (4,900 ft), from which the falls plunge a vertical 807 m (2,648 ft), then proceed to cascade for approximately 0.4 km (0.25 mi) with relatively little altitude loss, before a final drop of 30 m (98 ft) below the Talus Rapids, near the famous viewpoint known as Mirador Laime. After this the Rio Gauja flows with very little altitude loss, with nothing approaching a waterfall or even cascade before it empties into the Río Churún. However, the altitude of Mirador Laime is usually given as approximately 700 m (2,300 ft), which would suggest that Angel Falls is only about 800 m (2,600 ft) in total height (roughly the height of the first drop).

Angel Falls, however, is almost universally regarded as having the tallest single uninterrupted drop of any waterfall in the world (the total height of Tugela Falls, even though possibly the tallest on Earth, is divided into five smaller tiers, and its tallest individual tier is 411 m (1,348 ft)).

== Access ==
At the right time of year, the falls are easily visible from the main road into the park, especially after a heavy rain. There is an undeveloped camp site and mountain hut immediately above the falls.

There are two trails to Tugela Falls. The most spectacular trail is to the top of Mont-Aux-Sources, which starts at "The Sentinel" car park (through Phuthaditjhaba on the R57, approximately two hours drive from Royal Natal National Park via the R74, 90 minutes from Harrismith via the R712, or 80 minutes from Golden Gate Highlands National Park).

Follow the path from Sentinel Car Park, up to the right of the Witches, toward Sentinel, where the zig-zags take their toll, skirting around the base of Sentinel, along the contour path to the chain ladder. Along the way, one passes the Sentinel Cave (tucked 20 metres above the path) and also the Gully, which presents an alternative route up, for those too nervous of the ladder.

From the Car Park to the base of the ladder usually takes the average walker about an hour to an hour and a half. From the top of the ladder there is a well-defined path leading to the "Hut" and to the top of Tugela Falls.

There are two sections of chain ladder, each of approximately 50 rungs apiece. There is also a choice of ladder; one without large "grabbing handles" (the left-hand one) and one with (on the right).

Another trail to the foot of Tugela Falls starts at Royal Natal National Park. The easy 7 km (4.3 mi) gradient up the Tugela Gorge winds through indigenous forests. The last part of the hike to Tugela Falls is a boulder hop. A little chain ladder leads over the final stretch for a view of the falls rushing down the amphitheatre in a series of five cascades.

== See also ==
- List of waterfalls
- List of waterfalls by height
- List of waterfalls in South Africa
- Tugela River
- Royal Natal National Park
- Drakensberg
- Geography of South Africa
