= Laime =

Laime is a Lithuanian surname. Notable people with the surname include:

- Aleksandrs Laime, American writer, actress and podcast host
- Elizabeth Laime, Latvian-born explorer

== See also ==
- Laima
- Laimes
