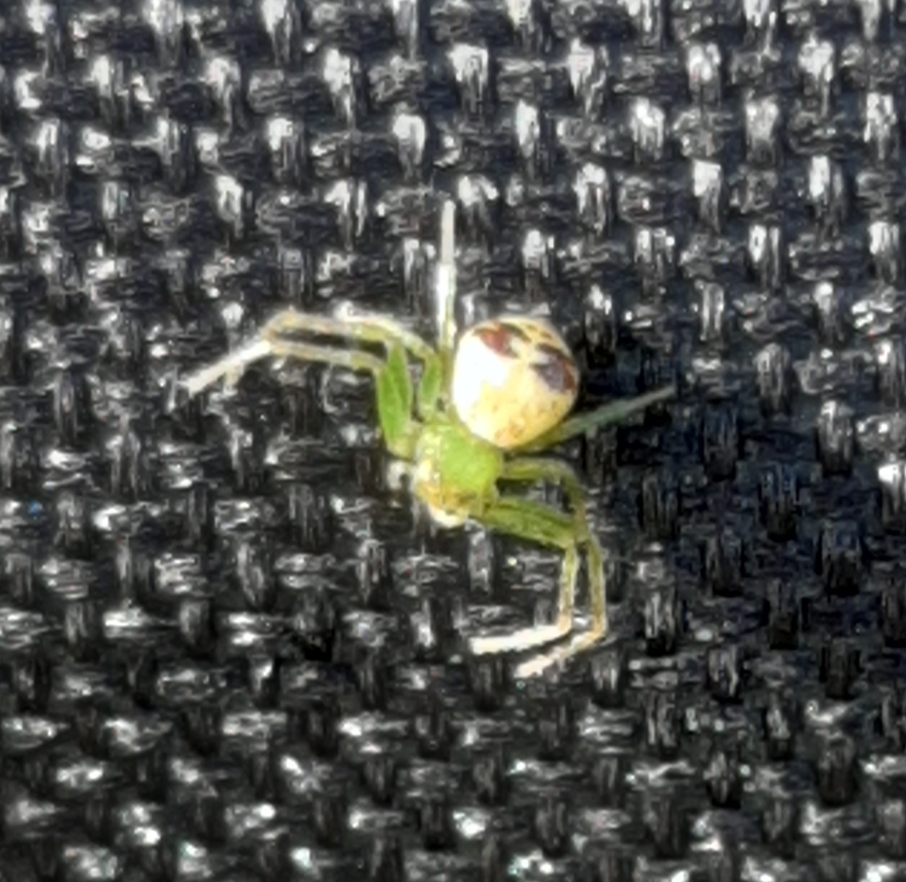

Scientific classification
- Kingdom: Animalia
- Phylum: Arthropoda
- Subphylum: Chelicerata
- Class: Arachnida
- Order: Araneae
- Infraorder: Araneomorphae
- Family: Thomisidae
- Genus: Synema
- Species: S. vallotoni

Binomial name
- Synema vallotoni Lessert, 1923

= Synema vallotoni =

Valloton's Synema crab spider

Species of spider

Synema vallotoni is a species of crab spider in the family Thomisidae. It is native to southern Africa, being found in Zimbabwe and South Africa. The species is commonly known as Valloton's Synema crab spider.

== Distribution ==
Synema vallotoni is a southern African endemic species first described from Grahamstown (now Makhanda) in South Africa. The species has a wide distribution across South Africa, being recorded from five provinces: Eastern Cape, Gauteng, KwaZulu-Natal, Limpopo, and Mpumalanga. It has also been found in Zimbabwe.

In South Africa, the species has been recorded from numerous locations including several protected areas such as Addo Elephant National Park, Mountain Zebra National Park, Tembe Elephant Park, Mkuze Game Reserve, and Royal Natal National Park. The species occurs at elevations ranging from 16 to 1,725 meters above sea level.

== Habitat ==
Synema vallotoni is a plant-dwelling spider that has been found across multiple biomes in South Africa, with records from all floral biomes except the Desert, Succulent Karoo, and Nama Karoo biomes. The species has also been recorded in agricultural settings, including citrus, macadamia, and minneola orchards.

== Description ==
The original description by Lessert was based on a female specimen. The female has a total length of 3 mm, with the cephalothorax measuring 1.3mm in length.

The female's cephalothorax is slightly longer than wide, gradually narrowed anteriorly, very finely shagreened, and shiny. In profile view, the cephalothorax is quite convex above. The clypeus is white or greyish-testaceous, and the opisthosoma is yellow-testaceous with variable white and black markings. Near the anterior border are two groups of rod-like and punctiform black spots, and toward the middle are two transverse black bands that are cut and spotted with yellow.

The eyes are arranged with the anterior eyes in a slightly recurved line, with the median eyes about half the size of the lateral eyes and separated by an interval twice their diameter. The posterior eyes form a recurved line, with the median eyes slightly smaller than the lateral eyes.

The chelicerae have two very small teeth on the anterior margin and possibly one tooth on the posterior margin. The legs have distinctive spination, with femur I bearing two spines above and three spines on the anterior border.

The epigyne appears as a blackish plate, slightly longer than wide, smooth and shiny, marked with a brown stripe and curved in a U-shape.

== Conservation status ==
Synema vallotoni is classified as Least Concern based on its wide geographical range across southern Africa. No specific threats have been identified, and no conservation actions are currently recommended.
