= Philip Mould =

English art dealer and art historian (born 1960)

Philip Mould OBE
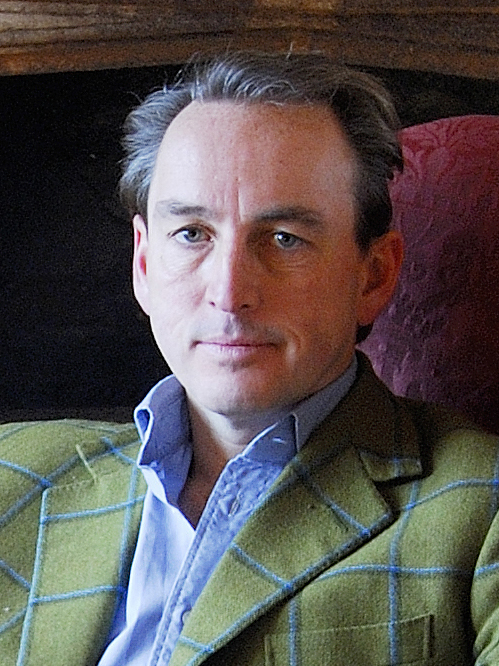
- Mould in August 2011
- Born: Philip Jonathan Clifford Mould; 4 March 1960 (age 66); Wirral, Cheshire, England
- Education: University of East Anglia
- Occupations: Art dealer; art historian; broadcaster
- Years active: 1982–present
- Website: www.philipmould.com

Philip Jonathan Clifford Mould (born 4 March 1960) is an English art dealer, London gallery owner, art historian, writer and broadcaster. He has made a number of major art discoveries, including works of Thomas Gainsborough, Anthony Van Dyck and Thomas Lawrence.

Mould is the author of two books on art discovery and is widely consulted by the media on the subject. He co-presents on BBC television, Fake or Fortune?, an investigative art history programme, with journalist and broadcaster Fiona Bruce.

== Early life and education ==
Mould was born in Wirral, Cheshire and educated at Kingsmead School, Hoylake, at Worth School and at the University of East Anglia, from which he graduated with a BA in History of Art in 1981.

Mould's father owned a printing factory in Liverpool and his family was based in the Wirral Peninsula. Mould made friends with the owner of a local antiques shop, who taught him to read hallmarks on silver when he was just 11 or 12 years old, and by the age of 14 he was dealing in antique silver.

== Career ==
Mould began art dealing in his early teens and has since established an art dealership specialising in British art, a subject on which he is internationally consulted. He has sold works to public institutions such as the Metropolitan Museum of Art (New York), National Portrait Gallery (London), Museum of Fine Arts, Boston, Tate, the Huntington Library (California), and the Royal Albert Memorial Museum.

Mould has worked as a valuer for the Heritage Lottery Fund and the Government's Acceptance in Lieu scheme. Between 1988 and 2010 he acted as honorary art adviser to the House of Commons and the House of Lords. He is president of the charity Kids in Museums, president and ex-chairman of Plantlife International, a patron of Fight for Sight and Action for ME. He was elected as a fellow of the Linnean Society in 2012.

Mould is also a trustee of Benton End, the former home of artist Cedric Morris and Arthur Lett-Haines, who ran the East Anglian School of Painting and Drawing in the house.

Mould is a regular broadcaster, reviewer and writer for the national press. His television work includes writing and presenting the Channel 4 series Changing Faces, and featuring as an expert on the Antiques Roadshow. In 2011, he began co-hosting the television programme Fake or Fortune? with Fiona Bruce. Fake or Fortune? has regularly drawn an audience of 5 million and in 2016 it won Best Factual Programme at the RTS West of England Awards. He has authored two critically acclaimed books on art discovery.

In recognition of his art world expertise and contribution to portrait heritage, he was created OBE in the 2005 New Year Honours list. For his achievements in his field, as well as his involvement with numerous charities and broadcasting, Mould received an honorary doctorate in July 2013 at his former university, the University of East Anglia. In 2019, he received the EVCOM (Event and Visual Communication Association) Fellowship award. The citation stated: "His expertise has shaped our understanding and knowledge of art today, and how we communicate about it". In 2023, Mould received an Honorary Doctorate of Arts from the University of Plymouth.

In January 2014, Mould warned of the increasing prevalence of what he termed "trapping" in which crooked sellers misleadingly hint that fake artworks have genuine provenance, without actually making false descriptions or asserting attributions.

=== Art discoveries ===
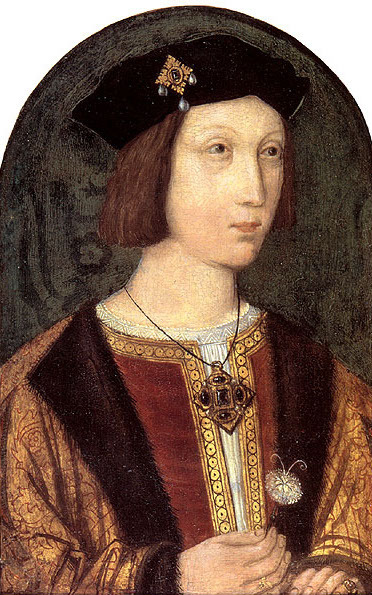
Portrait of Arthur, Prince of Wales (1486–1502, Anglo-Flemish School) reidentified by Mould

Mould has made a number of major art discoveries, including some of Thomas Gainsborough's earliest known works, the only known portrait of Arthur, Prince of Wales and lost works by Anthony van Dyck and Thomas Lawrence. In January 2021, Mould found a miniature portrait of French king Henri III by Jean Decourt.

Mould described some of the basic concepts for art discoveries, in an article published in The Guardian:

Although [Mould] acknowledged that auctioneers do not have the benefit of cleaning and restoring works, which help to reveal true quality, he added: "As art dealers, we scour daily the world's auction catalogues for paintings that are ... wrongly identified ... In any week, our finds might range from a misidentified Tudor icon to a misattributed 18th-century landscape … but by a strange chance we seem to have hit a seam of Van Dycks."

== Personal life ==
Mould and his wife, Catherine, have a son born in 1997. Since 2002 they have owned Duck End House in Oxfordshire, close to Chipping Norton. In 2009, false allegations against him of infidelity and financial insolvency were planted in newspapers by a rival art dealer, later disgraced.

In August 2014, Mould was one of 200 public figures who were signatories to a letter to The Guardian opposing Scottish independence in the run-up to September's referendum on that issue. In October 2015, Mould appeared on BBC's Gardeners' World, in the garden of his home, discussing his passion for nature and talked of his interest in varieties of rose which would have been grown in the time of Sir Anthony van Dyck. He also discussed the work of one of his favourite artists, Cedric Morris, who was also a great plantsman. Mould is a keen collector of Morris's work (for his private collection), and champions modern British artists in general; he cites the Bloomsbury Group amongst his favourites.

In April 2020, during the COVID-19 pandemic, Mould started recording a series of short videos he called Art in Isolation, where the viewer is invited into his home of Duck End and given personal musings on one of his collected artworks. 20 episodes were made, plus a number of "Call to Camera" episodes where Mould asked viewers to share which works of art gave them "solace and sustenance in isolation."

He is president of the wild plant conservation charity Plantlife.

== Bibliography ==
- Sleepers: In Search of Lost Old Masters. London: Fourth Estate. 1995. ISBN 978-1857022186., retitled in paperback as... The Trail of Lot 163: In Search of Lost Art Treasures. London: Fourth Estate. 1997. ISBN 978-1857025231.
- Sleuth: The Amazing Quest for Lost Art Treasures. London: HarperCollins. 2009. ISBN 978-0007281367., retitled for US edition as... The Art Detective: Fakes, Frauds and Finds and the Search for Lost Treasures. New York: Viking. 2010. ISBN 978-0670021857.
- Cedric Morris: (1889–1982) Beyond the Garden Wall. London: Philip Mould Gallery. 2018. ISBN 978-0992726447. Exhibition 18 April – 22 July 2018
