= Ruth Robertson =

American photojournalist (1905–1998)

- Robertson working as a war correspondent with Speed Graphic Alaska 1945
- Born: May 24, 1905; Taylorville, Illinois
- Died: February 17, 1998 (aged 92)
- Known for: Photography

Ruth Agnes McCall Robertson Marietta (May 24, 1905 – February 17, 1998) was an American photojournalist who accomplished many "firsts" for women photographers and is also known mostly for photographing Angel Falls in Venezuela and surveying them to establish them as tallest waterfalls in the world; it was published in National Geographic magazine, November 1949. She was born in Taylorville, Illinois.

== Biography ==
Robertson was a ground-breaking photographer who in 1939 was hired by The Peoria Evening Star newspaper as its first “girl photographer.” Three years later Robertson moved to Chicago and began working for Acme News Pictures, which later became United Press International. While working for Acme, Robertson co-founded an independent news service called Press Syndicate. Through this connection Robertson received photographic assignments which made her the first female photographer allowed onto the baseball infield at Wrigley Field in 1943, and the "only female photographer at the 1944 Democratic and Republican conventions."

Robertson had been a journalist during World War II and after she returned to her routine job at the New York Herald Tribune, felt that her "life lost its thrill." In 1949, Robertson eagerly accepted an assignment to Venezuela. She became interested in Angel Falls and initially took aerial photographs. On April 23, 1949, she set out on an expedition to the base with the Latvian explorer Aleksandrs Laime to reach the falls. They traveled on the Churún River in dugout canoes and endured downpours of rain. On May 12, they finally reached the falls. The expedition was the first documented expedition, which included ten Kamarakoto natives (including another woman named Juanita), to reach the foot of the falls, and was also the first to measure them.

Robertson stayed in Venezuela for the next 12 years, and became the editor of the Daily Journal (formerly known as Caracas Journal), and subsequently moved to Mexico, before returning to the U.S. in the mid-1960s, and re-locating to Rosenberg, Texas, where she died in 1998.

The Ruth Robertson Archives have been preserved at the Harry Ransom Center of the University of Texas in Austin.

Author Kathryn Casey's book, Angel Falls, released in September 2023, was inspired by Robertson's life.

== Associations ==
- Society of Woman Geographers, member
- Pan American Round Table of Houston, member
- Foreign Correspondents' Club, Mexico City, member

== Bibliography ==
Books and articles by Robertson or with photographs by Robertson:

- "Skyway to Asia", photos and captions by Ruth Robertson, Chicago Tribune, May 6, 1945, pC10; Des Moines Sunday Register, June 17, 1945
- "ALSIB Story Compiled by Newswoman", Flying Magazine, October 1945 Flying Magazine
- "Canada, The Link--USA to USSR," by Vilhjalmur Stefansson, The Rotarian, November 1946 The Rotarian
- "Jungle Journey to the World's Highest Waterfall," by Ruth Robertson, National Geographic, November 1949
- "Comparison for a Cataract", Life magazine, May 2, 1955 LIFE
- Churun Meru--The Tallest Angel: Of Jungles and Other Journeys by Ruth Robertson, Whitmore Publishing, 1975. ISBN 0-87426-039-6
- "Over the Edge" by Dan Morrison with photos by Ruth Robertson, TDC Magazine, May 1992

Articles about Robertson:

- "Girl Photog Runs Afoul Army in Alaska", Editor and Publisher, 1945
- "Peoria Girl Goes Overseas," Peoria Journal-Transcript, January 15, 1945
- "Topics of the Times," New York Times May 18, 1949
- "Angel on Devil's Mountain," Newsweek, June 6, 1949
- "Treasure Hunt in a Lost World," by Richard F. Dempewolff, Popular Mechanics, October 1950 Popular Mechanics
- "A Photographic Gift of a Venezuelan Trek," National Geographic, September 1990
