= Duck End House =

House in Oxfordshire, England

Coordinates: 51°58′44″N 1°31′20″W

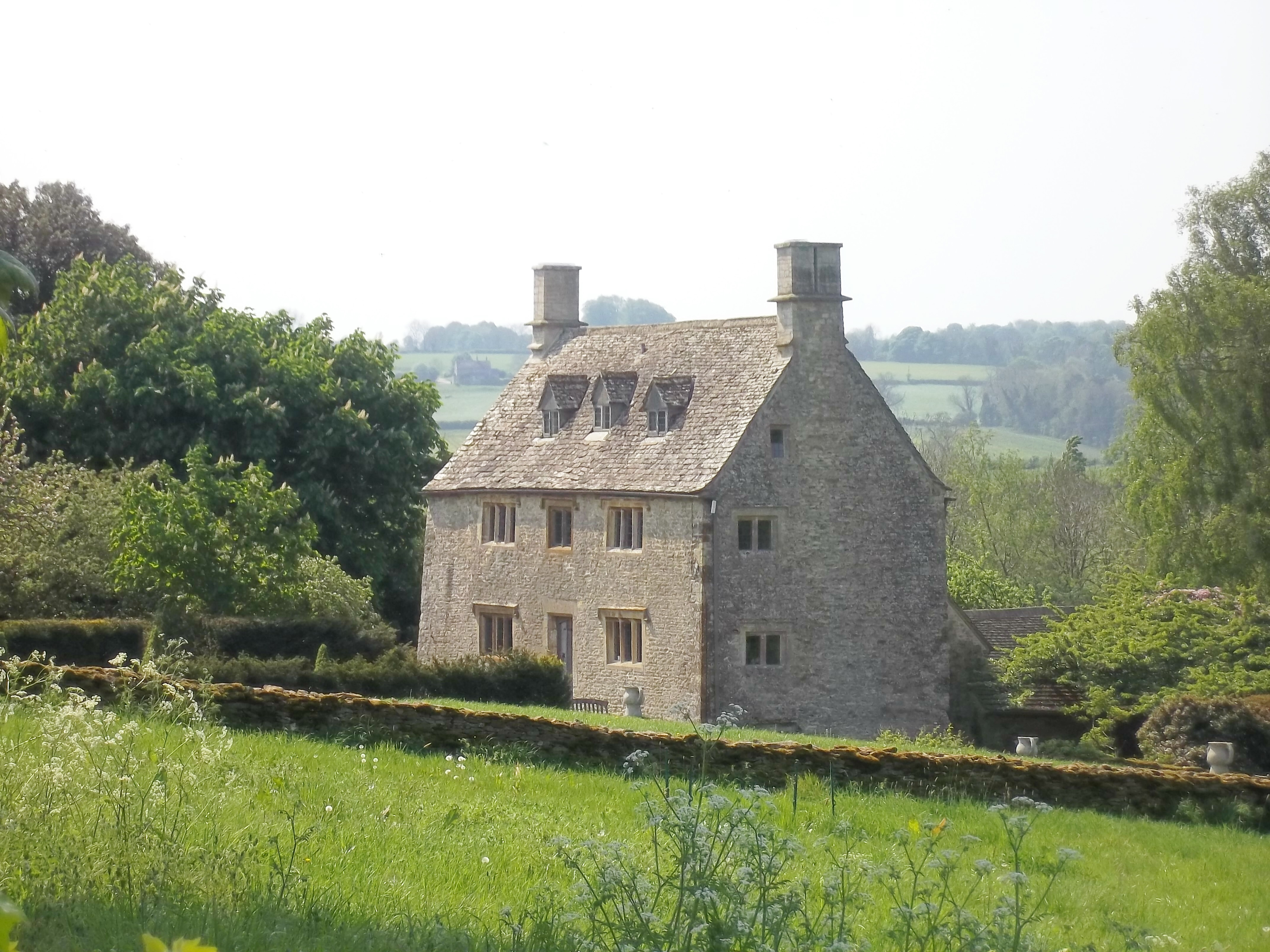
Duck End House in 2011

Duck End House is an early-17th-century property, probably a manor house, in the parish of Rollright, near Chipping Norton, Oxfordshire, England.

The house was built in 1628 by Lady Anne Cope, widow of the leading Puritan Sir Anthony Cope. The property was once owned by the seventeenth-century politician Sir William Cope. It has been Grade II listed since 1957. It was once owned by British writer Penelope Lively.

Since 2002 it has been the country home of art dealer Philip Mould.
