= Carrao River =

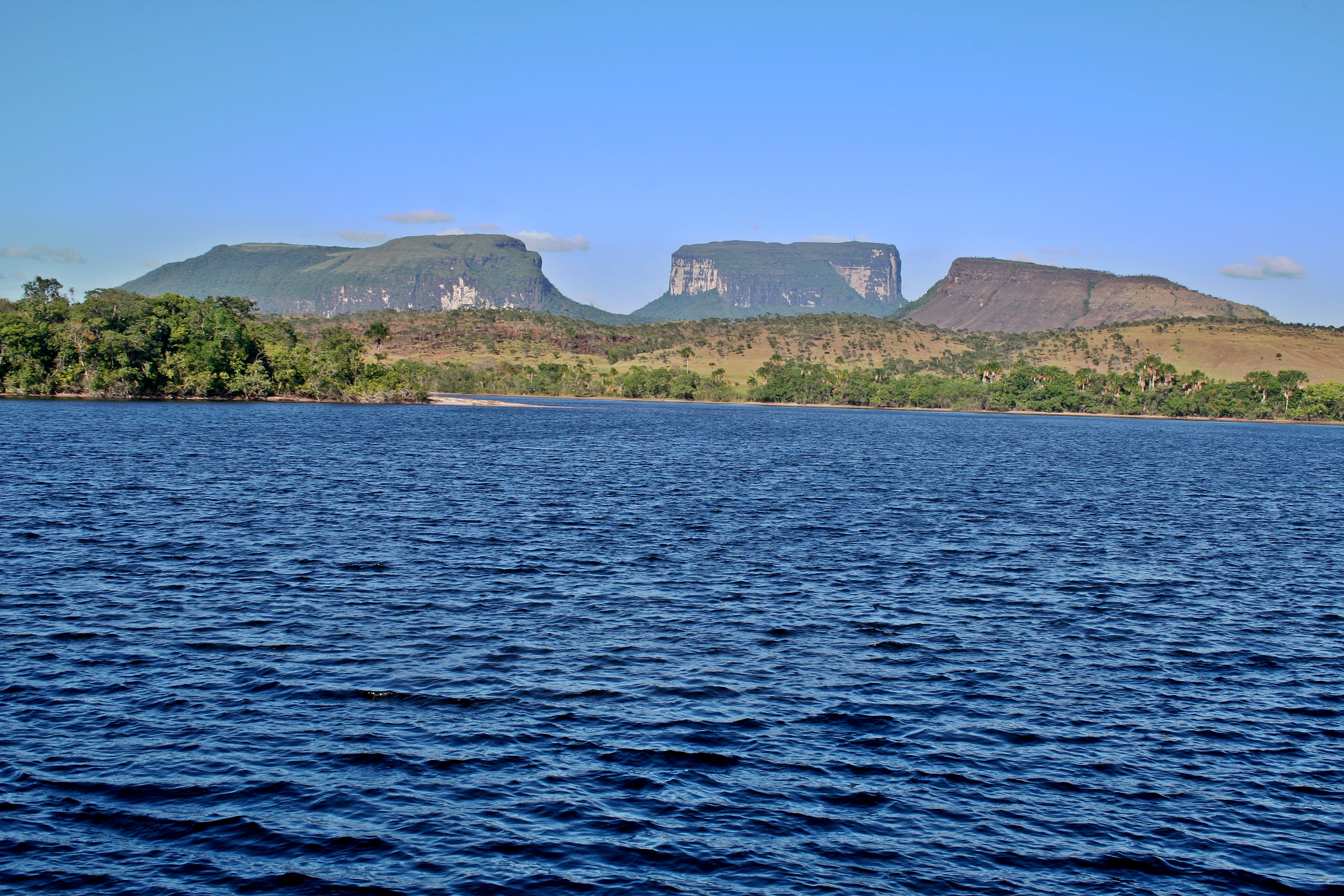
- Carrao River and overlooking the tepuis of Kurun, Kusari and Kuravaina.

Location
- Country: Venezuela

Physical characteristics
- Source
  - location: Canaima National Park
- Mouth
  - location: Caroní River
- Length: 287 km (178 mi)
- Basin size: 7,000 km^{2} (2,700 sq mi)
- Discharge
  - average: 40,000 cu ft/s (1,100 m^{3}/s)

Carrao River is a river of Venezuela. It is part of the Orinoco River basin. It is well known for one of its major tributaries, the Churún River, which feeds Angel Falls, the world's highest waterfall. Another major tributary is the Ahonda River. The Carrao River flows primarily through Canaima National Park. As it starts to flow north, the Carrao River widens and meets the small town of Canaima, a vacationing destination. It flows north again, but it eventually narrows. As it continues its course west, it drains into the Caroní River, a major tributary of the Orinoco River in Venezuela.

== See also ==
- List of rivers of Venezuela
