= Amphitheatre (Drakensberg) =

Cliff of the Northern Drakensberg, South Africa

Coordinates: 28°46′S 28°54′E

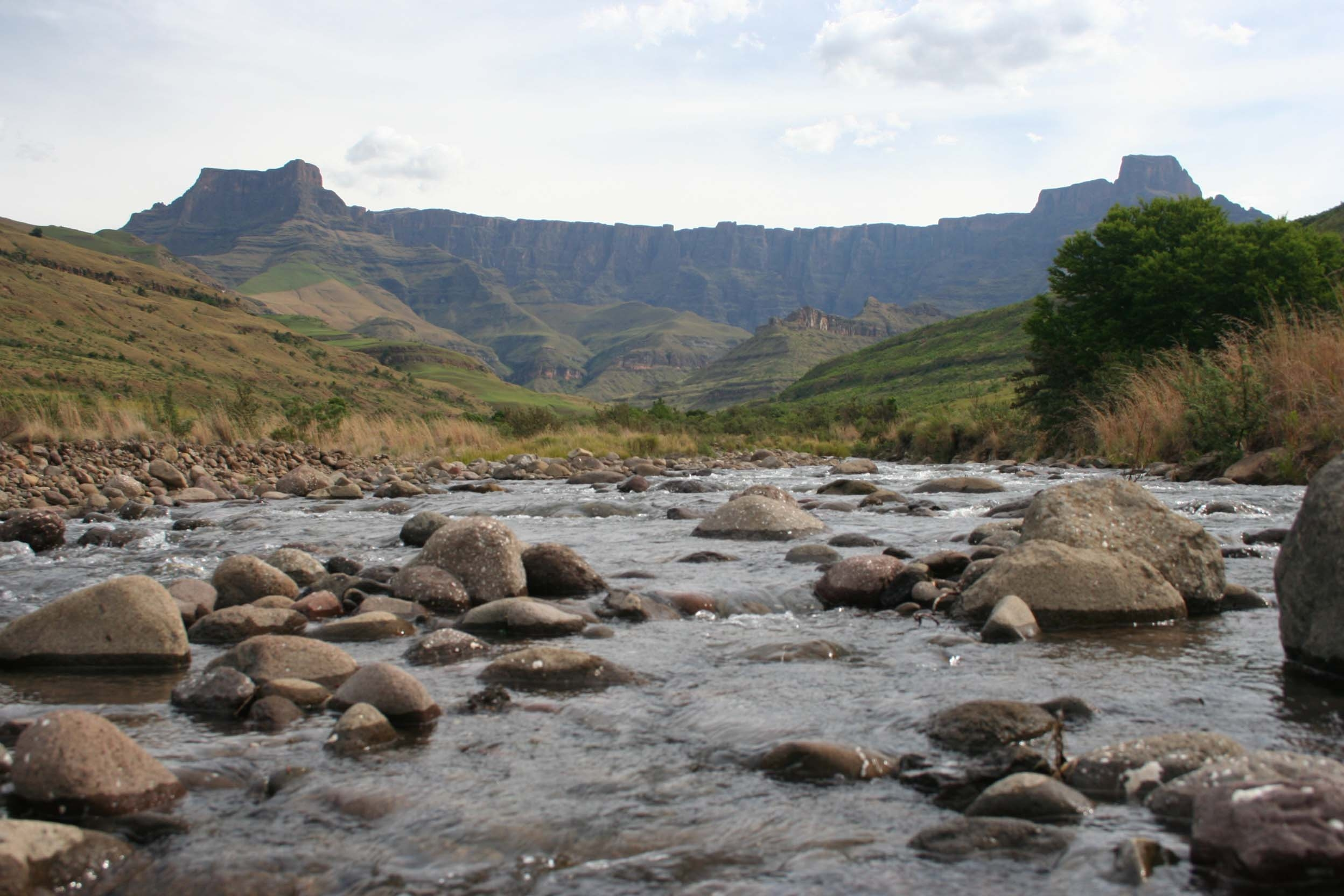
The Amphitheatre with the Tugela River

The Amphitheatre is one of the geographical features of the Northern Drakensberg, South Africa. The cliff face of the Amphitheatre is roughly three times the size of the total combined area of all the cliff faces in Yosemite's famous El Capitan, and more than 10 times the size of El Capitan's most famous (South Western) face. It is part of the Royal Natal National Park.

The Amphitheatre is more than 5 kilometres (3.1 mi) in length and has precipitous cliffs rising approximately 1,220 metres (4,000 ft) along its entire length. The bottom of the valley floor, from where many photographs of the mountain structure are taken, is over 1,830 metres (6,000 ft) below the highest point of the amphitheatre (the summit being over 3,050 metres (10,000 ft) above sea level—with Mont-Aux-Sources just over 3,254 metres (11,000 ft) above sea level). The Tugela Falls, the world's tallest falls, plunge over 948 metres (3,100 ft) from the Amphitheatre's cliff tops.

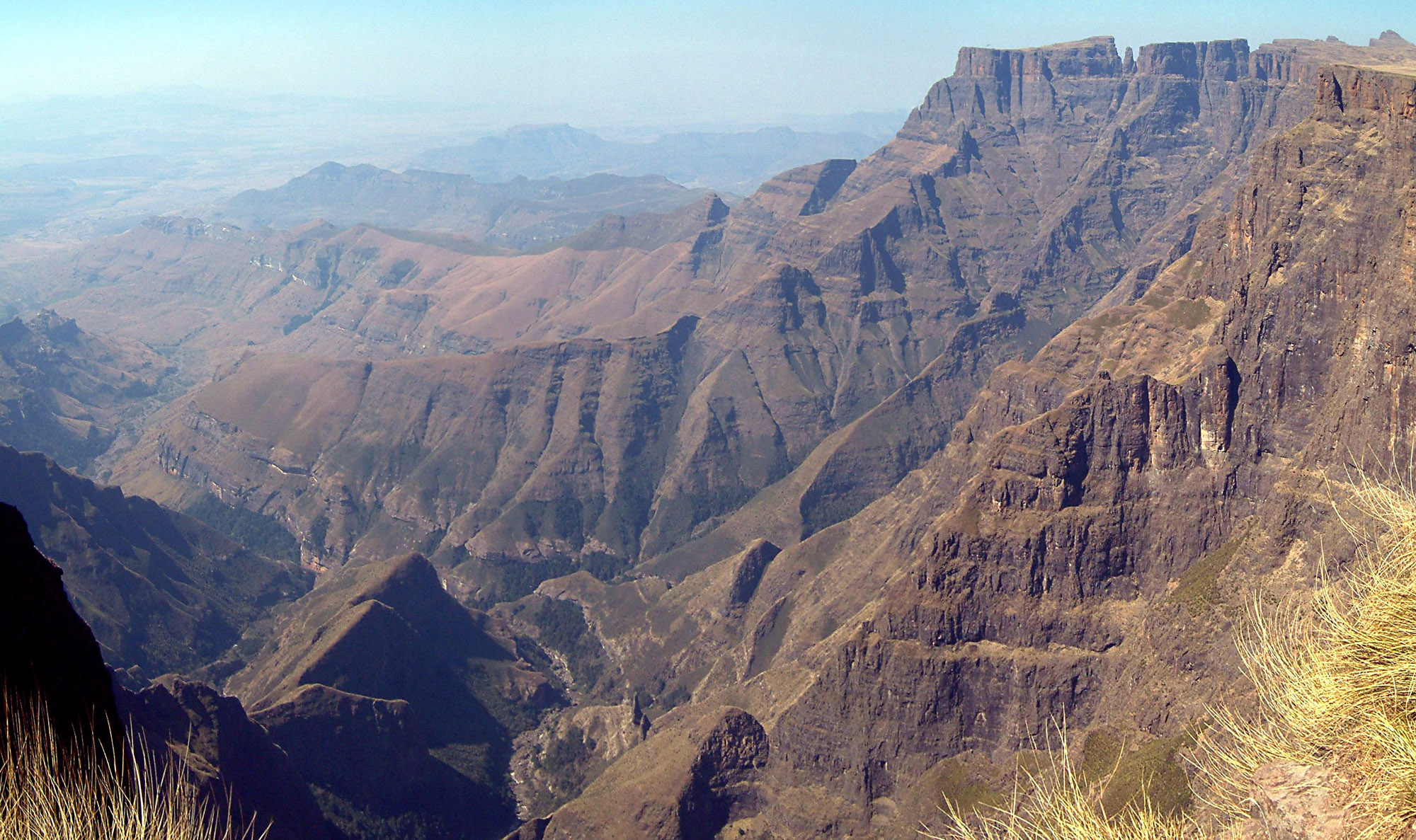
The Amphitheatre ridge looking southeast

The mountain hiking trail to the top of Mount-Aux-Sources starts at the Sentinel car park above the Witsieshoek Mountain Lodge, about 2,500 metres (8,200 ft) above sea level. Another trail to the foot of the Tugela Falls starts at Royal Natal National Park. The easy seven kilometre gradient up the Tugela gorge winds through indigenous forests. The Tugela Falls, which is situated at the top of the Amphitheatre, has been described as a "highlight of Drakensberg".

In 1964, film director Cy Endfield shot the exterior locations in the mountainous Drakensberg National Park for the epic war film Zulu starring Michael Caine and Stanley Baker. The set for the British field hospital and supply depot at Rorke's Drift was created by the Tugela River with the Amphitheatre in the background. The real location of the battle at Rorke's Drift was about 100 mi (160 km) to the northeast near the small hillock known as Isandlwana.

== See also ==
- Drakensberg
- Tugela Falls
- Royal Natal National Park
