= David Watts (teacher) =

British teacher and amateur sound recordist

- Born: 1912 or 1913
- Died: 2013 (age 100)
- Occupation: Head teacher
- Employer: Kingsmead School
- Known for: Wildlife sound recording

Watts' recording of the dawn chorus in Royal Natal National Park, KwaZulu-Natal, South Africa

David Watts was a British teacher and amateur sound recordist. He was head teacher of Kingsmead School at Hoylake for thirty years. The British Library's National Sound Archive holds his collection of wildlife sound recordings, many of which were made in South Africa.

Watts was the son of Arthur Watts, the founding headmaster of Kingsmead.

Watts died in 2013, aged 100. He was survived by his wife Dorothy and their three children, who attended a memorial service in his honour at Kingsmead School on 11 May 2013. His obituary, which described him as "eccentric and affable", was published in The Times.
