= Angel Falls =

Tallest single drop waterfall in the world, Venezuela

- Salto Ángel (Spanish); Churún Vená (Pemon)
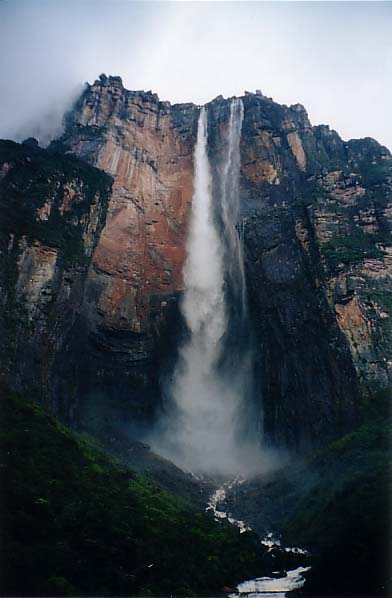
- Angel Falls, Bolívar State, Venezuela

- Location within Venezuela
- Location: Auyán-tepui, Canaima National Park, Bolívar, Venezuela
- Coordinates: 5°58′03″N 62°32′08″W
- Type: Plunges
- Total height: 979 m (3,212 ft)
- Number of drops: 2
- Longest drop: 807 m (2,648 ft)
- Watercourse: Körepakupai Vená River
- World height ranking: 1

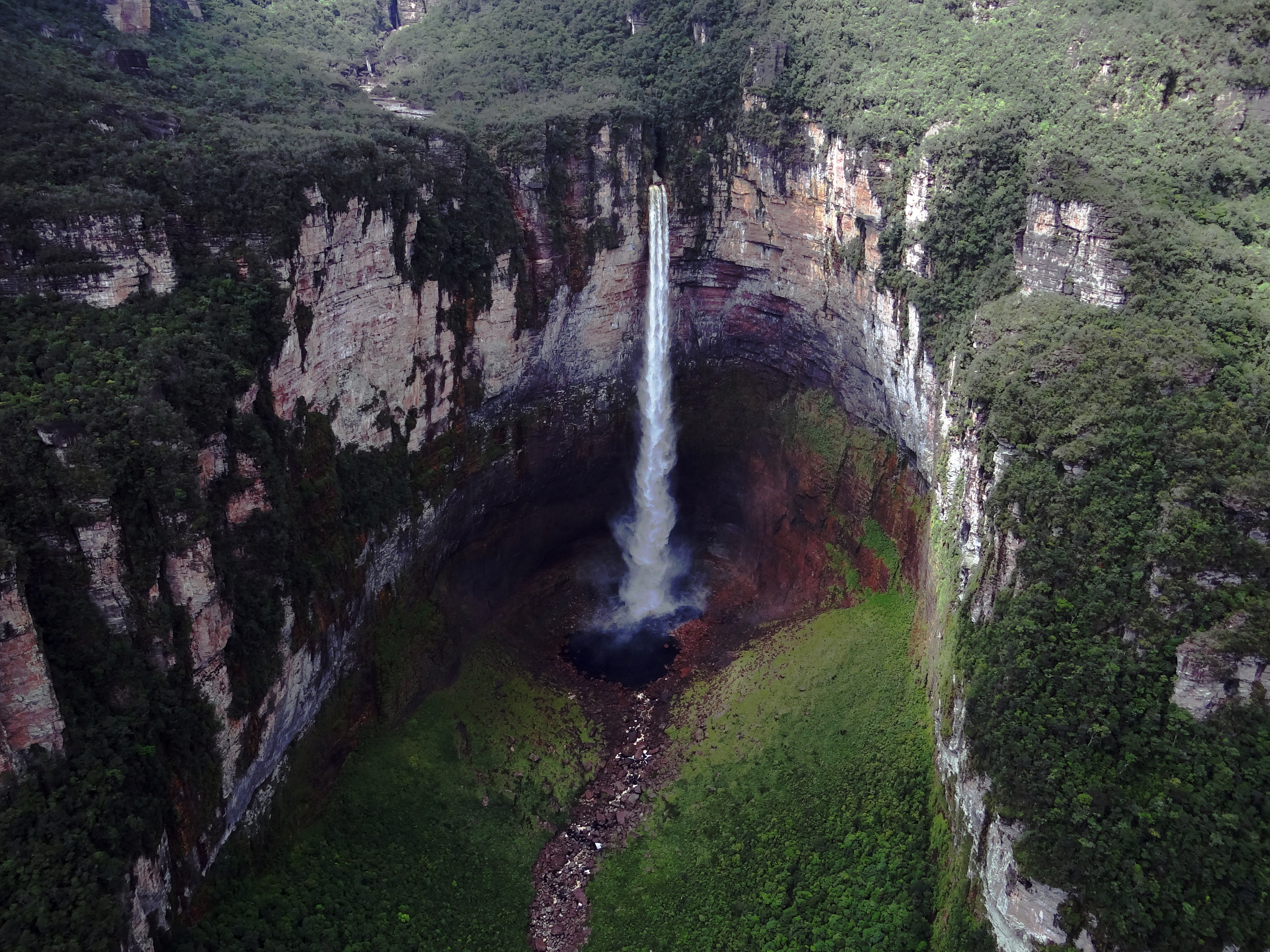
Aerial view of Dragon Falls (Churún Merú), a waterfall 10 km south of Angel Falls at 5°52′32″N 62°32′07″W

Angel Falls (Spanish: Salto Ángel; Pemon: Körepakupai Vená) (Note: Vená meaning 'big fall'.) is a waterfall in Venezuela. It is the world's tallest uninterrupted waterfall, with a height of 979 metres (3,212 ft), and a plunge of 807 m (2,648 ft). The waterfall drops over the edge of the Auyán-tepui mountain in the Canaima National Park (Spanish: Parque Nacional Canaima), a UNESCO World Heritage Site in the Gran Sabana region of Bolívar State. The height figure, 979 m (3,212 ft), mostly consists of the main plunge but also includes about 400 metres (1,300 ft) of sloped cascade and rapids below the drop and then a 30-metre-high (100 ft) plunge downstream of these talus rapids.

The falls are along a fork of the Río Körepa which flows into the Churún River, a tributary of the Carrao River, itself a tributary of the Orinoco River.

With regard to overall height, a revisited validation of waterfall measurements is not available, and there is still uncertainty whether Angel Falls or South Africa's Tugela Falls is the tallest (both measurements were taken at considerable distance from the two waterfalls).

== History ==
=== Etymology ===
The waterfall has been known as Angel Falls since the mid-20th century; they are named after Jimmie Angel, a U.S. aviator, who was the first person to fly over the falls 16 November 1933. Angel's ashes were scattered over the falls on 2 July 1960.

The common Spanish name Salto Ángel derives from his surname. In 2009, President Hugo Chávez announced his intention to change the name to the purported original indigenous Pemon term ("Kerepakupai-Merú", meaning "waterfall of the deepest place"), on the grounds that the nation's most famous landmark should bear an indigenous name. Explaining the name change, Chávez reportedly said, "This is ours, long before Angel ever arrived there... this is indigenous land." However he later said that he would not decree the change of name, but was only defending the use of Kerepakupai Vená.

=== Exploration ===
During his expedition to find the fabled city of El Dorado, Walter Raleigh described what was possibly a tepui (table top mountain), and he is said to have been the first European to view Angel Falls, although these claims are considered far-fetched. Some historians say that the first European to visit the waterfall was Fernando de Berrío, a Spanish explorer and governor from the 16th and 17th centuries. Other sources claim that the first Westerner to see the waterfall was the Spanish explorer Fèlix Cardona in 1927.

They were not known to the outside world until American aviator Jimmie Angel flew over them on 16 November 1933 on a flight while he was searching for a valuable ore bed.

Returning on 9 October 1937, Angel tried to land his Flamingo monoplane El Río Caroní atop Auyán-tepui, but the plane was damaged when the wheels sank into the marshy ground. Angel and his three companions, including his wife Marie, were forced to descend the tepui on foot. It took them 11 days to make their way back to civilization by the gradually sloping back side, but news of their adventure spread and the waterfall was named Angel Falls in his honor. The name of the waterfall—"Salto del Ángel"—was first published on a Venezuelan government map in December 1939.

Angel's plane remained on top of the tepui for 33 years before being lifted out by helicopter. It was restored at the Aviation Museum in Maracay, Venezuela and now sits outdoors on the front of the airport at Ciudad Bolívar in Venezuela.

The first recorded European to reach the base of the falls was the Latvian explorer Aleksandrs Laime, also known as Alejandro Laime to the native Pemon tribe. He reached the falls alone in 1946. He was the first to reach the upper side of the falls in the late 1950s, by climbing up the back side, where the slope is not vertical. He also reached Angel's plane 18 years after the crash landing. On 18 November 1955, Latvian independence day, he announced to the Venezuelan newspaper El Nacional that this stream without any known local name should be named after a Latvian river, Gauja. In the same year, this name was registered in the National Cartographic Institution of Venezuela. There is no convincing proof that the indigenous Pemon people had named the local streams, as Auyán-tepui was considered to be a dangerous place and was not visited by the indigenous people. However, lately the Pemon name Kerep is used as well. Laime was also the first to clear a trail that leads from the Churún River to the base of the falls. On the way is a viewpoint commonly used to capture the falls in photographs. It is named Mirador Laime ("Laime's Viewpoint" in Spanish) in his honor. This trail is used now mostly for tourists, to lead them from the Isla Ratón camp to the small clearing.

The official height of the falls was determined by a survey carried out by an expedition organized and financed by American journalist Ruth Robertson on 13 May 1949. Robertson's expedition, which began on 23 April 1949, was also the first to reach the foot of the falls. The first known attempt to climb the face of the cliff was made in 1968 during the wet season. It failed because of slippery rock. In 1969, a second attempt was made during the dry season. This attempt was thwarted by lack of water and an overhang 120 metres (400 ft) from the top. The first climb to the top of the cliff was completed on 13 January 1971. The climbers, a four-man team led by American mountaineer George Bogel, an electrical engineer from Pittsburgh, required nine and a half days to ascend and one and a half days to rappel down.

== Tourism ==
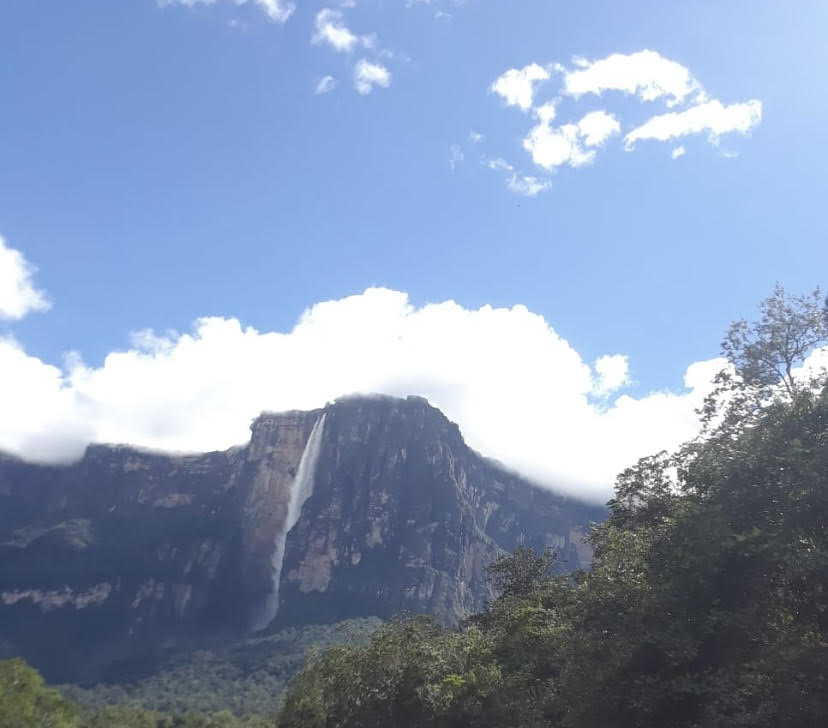

Angel Falls is one of Venezuela's top tourist attractions, though a trip to the falls is a complicated affair. The falls are located in an isolated jungle. A flight from Maiquetia Airport, Puerto Ordaz, or Ciudad Bolívar is required to reach Canaima camp, the starting point for river trips to the base of the falls. River trips generally take place from June to December, when the rivers are deep enough for use by the Pemon guides. During the dry season (December to March), the volume of water is less than in other months.

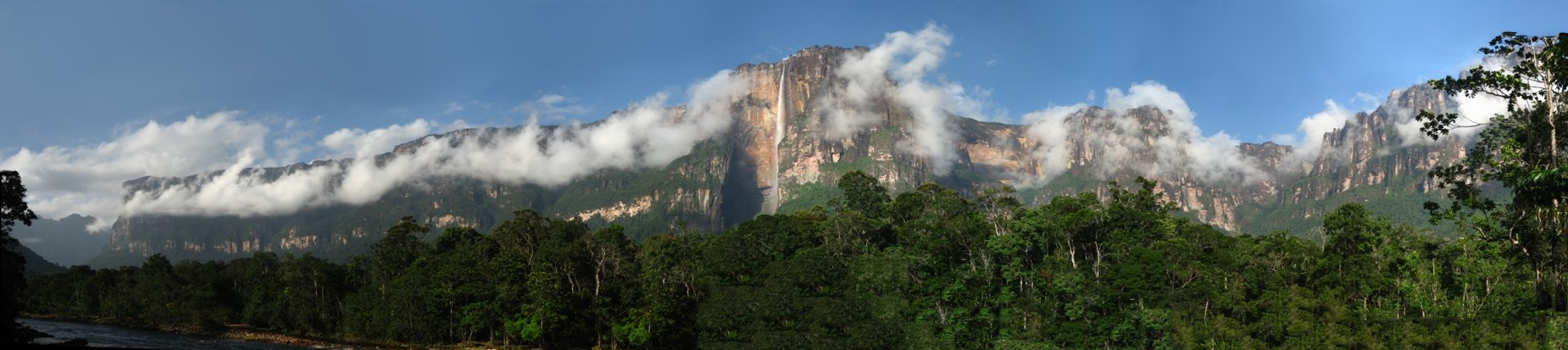
Partly clouded view of Auyán-tepui and Angel Falls (centre) from Isla Raton camp, the photograph was taken at the end of the dry season

=== BASE jumping ===
The first person to jump from Angel Falls was Max Botto of Venezuela in November 1983. The first person to complete a base jump from Angel Falls was American Jerry Bird; even though he leaped after Max Botto, he deployed his parachute later and subsequently landed first.

== Media ==
=== Cinema ===
Angel Falls was the main inspiration for the fictional Paradise Falls in Pixar's 2009 animated film, Up.

The American fantasy-romance film What Dreams May Come (1998), starring Robin Williams, Cuba Gooding Jr, and Annabella Sciorra, is set in Venezuela and shows Angel Falls.

Angel Falls was used as a setting for a scene in the action film remake Point Break (2015). Actors Edgar Ramirez and Luke Bracey are shown free-climbing the sheer rock face adjacent to the falls, then diving from the top.

In the film narrated by Lowell Thomas, Seven Wonders of the World (1956), Angel Falls was included as one of the seven wonders.

In November 1983, Mark III Productions of Miami, Florida filmed a short documentary about an expedition to BASE jump from Angel Falls, led by American skydiver Jerry Bird. It was broadcast on ABC's Ripley's Believe It or Not! in 1985.

The 1990 film Arachnophobia was partly set at Angel Falls.

=== Books ===
In 1997, Folco Quilici wrote Cielo verde a novel – long present in the bestseller list in Italy. Spanish writer Alberto Vázquez-Figueroa covered Jimmie Angel's adventures in his 1998 novel Ícaro— ISBN 9788408025023, later translated into several foreign languages. Another book that details how Angel Falls got its name is Truth or Dare: The Jimmie Angel Story, written by Jan-Willem de Vries ISBN 9781419673665. Angel Falls by Kathryn Casey (2023) is a historical fiction story inspired by the life of the photographer Ruth Robertson.

== See also ==
- List of waterfalls
- List of waterfalls by height
