= Aleksandrs Laime =

Latvian explorer (1911–1994)

- Laime (far left) with Ruth Robertson's expedition of 1949
- Born: July 9, 1911; Riga, Russian Empire (Now Latvia)
- Died: March 21, 1994 (aged 82); Canaima, Venezuela

Aleksandrs Laime (Spanish: Alejandro Laime, English: Alexander Laime) was a famous Latvian-born explorer. He is most noted for being the first recorded human to reach Angel Falls, located in Venezuela, by foot. He also established, together with Charles Baughan, the tourist camp of Canaima, created solely for the purpose of bringing tourists to Angel Falls.

== Early life ==
Aleksandrs Laime was born on July 9, 1911, in Riga. He grew up in Grīziņkalns neighborhood, and since early childhood was interested in adventure stories and shipping. At the age of 15, he learned basic principles of sailing in Ķīšezers. Together with some friends, they stole a sailboat and traveled to Liepāja. They planned to sail across the Baltic Sea to Sweden, but due to a storm were washed ashore on the Estonian island of Saaremaa. At age 16, Laime went to Paris, from where he traveled by foot through France. In Marseille, he boarded a merchant ship and traveled to Egypt, where he lived in Cairo for several months until his parents sent him money for his journey back home.

After his return to Riga, Laime studied at the Riga Technical School and graduated as a land surveyor. In 1936, Laime and a friend took a sailing trip to Danzig. There they changed their sailboat for kayaks and traveled through Poland. They wanted to reach the Black Sea, but were discouraged from such move by Romanian border guards. His friend went back home, but Laime traveled to Paris on a bicycle.

In 1939, Laime started a sailing trip from Riga to Africa, but due to start of World War II was stopped in Kiel. However, he managed to reach Africa via the United Kingdom and Spain. He traveled across the western coast of Africa until he reached Cape Town. Laime then boarded a merchant ship and traveled to the coasts of the United States and Canada. In 1940, he landed in Caracas and settled in Venezuela.

== Activity in Venezuela ==
After moving to Venezuela in 1940, Laime led many explorations through the jungles of the south of the country. During his first years in Venezuela, Laime worked as a topographer for a road construction department, and later he worked for the oil company Socony and Ingenerie de Orinoko. In 1942, Laime visited Canaima for the first time, and he settled there. Together with Charles Baughan and some other European partners, they started to develop tourism in Canaima and built an airfield and houses for visitors. In 1949, he was part of Ruth Robertson's team that reached Angel Falls by ground and surveyed the falls. He reached the summit of Auyantepui in 1955, and, along with his native companion Manuel Fiorentino, were the first to reach Jimmie Angel's crashed plane "Flamingo." Laime explored the surface of the tepui, and named formerly unnamed rivers there. He gave the river on which Angel Falls is located the name Gauja, after the Latvian river of the same name. It is sometimes written as Río Gauya. He also named three other rivers, Río Venta, Río Daugava and Río Ogre, all after celebrated rivers of Latvia. He was married to Vilma Laime, who died in April 2009 at her residence in Huntingdon Valley, Pennsylvania, and is survived by his son Alexander Laime, stepdaughter Ilse Wood, grandchildren Robert Wood Jr. and Sandra Jones, and great-grandchildren, Rachel Wood, Carissa Wood, Zackary Wood, and Richard Jones, all of whom reside in the states of Pennsylvania or New Jersey.

=== Search for the "Golden River" ===
After hearing news of Jimmie Angel's famed "Golden River", Laime, like many of his contemporaries, went in search of the river. He never publicized if he actually found it, but close friends claim that he actually had found it. After Laime's death in 1994, approximately $20,000 were found in a tin can, underneath Laime's fireplace in his house on Isla Orquidea (an island on the Río Carrao, two hours upstream from Canaima).

=== Death ===
Laime came down the Churun River on March 20, 1994, to stockpile food and supplies for the next few weeks, as he usually did. He spoke to the wife of Ramón Jiménez, asking for him. He complained to her about chest pains, and said that he knew that the end was near. He is reported as saying that he wanted to climb the great tepui (Auyantepui) one last time, to die up there. He then went to the nearby Waku Lodge for a drink. He died shortly thereafter in the bathroom, having had a heart attack.
