= Royal Natal National Park =

National park in KwaZulu-Natal, South Africa

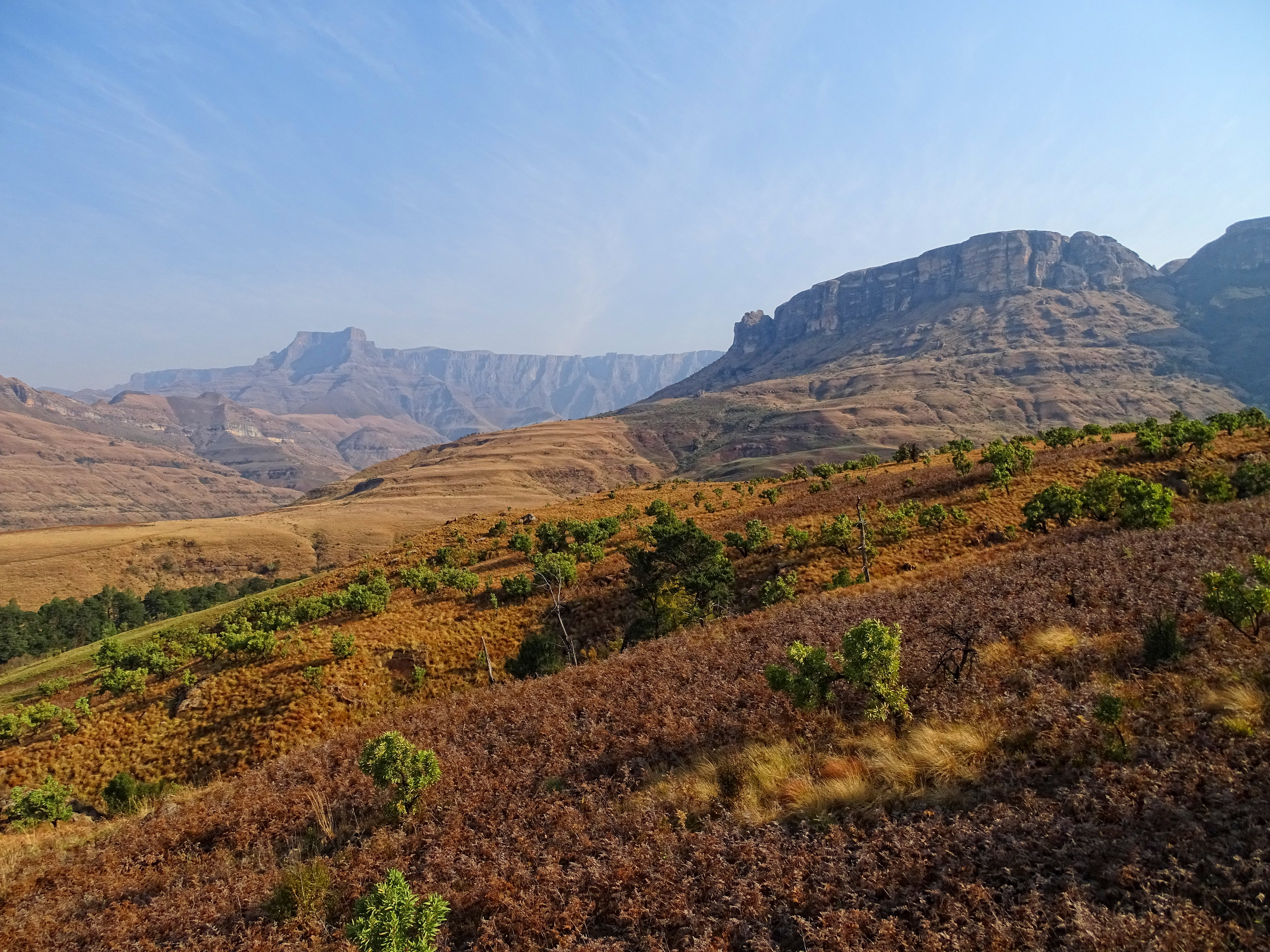
- Policeman's Helmet in Royal Natal Park

- Location within KwaZulu-Natal
- Location: KwaZulu-Natal, South Africa
- Nearest city: Harrismith
- Coordinates: 28°41′20″S 28°56′42″E
- Area: 80.94 km^{2} (31.25 sq mi)
- Established: 16 september 1916
- Governing body: Ezemvelo KZN Wildlife
- The dawn chorus in Royal Natal National Park, recorded by David Watts on 27 November 1984

Royal Natal National Park is an 80.94-square-kilometre (31.25 sq mi) park in the KwaZulu-Natal province of South Africa and forms part of the uKhahlamba Drakensberg Park, a UNESCO World Heritage Site. Notwithstanding the name, it is actually not a South African National Park managed by the SANParks, but rather a Provincial Park managed by Ezemvelo KZN Wildlife. This park is now included in the Maloti-Drakensberg Transfrontier Conservation Area, a Peace Park.

The Drakensberg Mountains were once the hunting ground of the San people (bushmen). Though the San no longer live in the area, they recorded their exploits in the form of remarkable rock paintings.

The main feature of the park is the Drakensberg Amphitheatre, a rock wall 5 kilometres (3.1 mi) long and up to 1,200 metres (3,900 ft) high, Mont-Aux-Sources peak where the Orange and Tugela rivers have their source, and the 948-metre (3,110 ft) Tugela Falls. A distinctive rock feature and popular hiking destination in the park is the so-called "Policeman's Helmet".

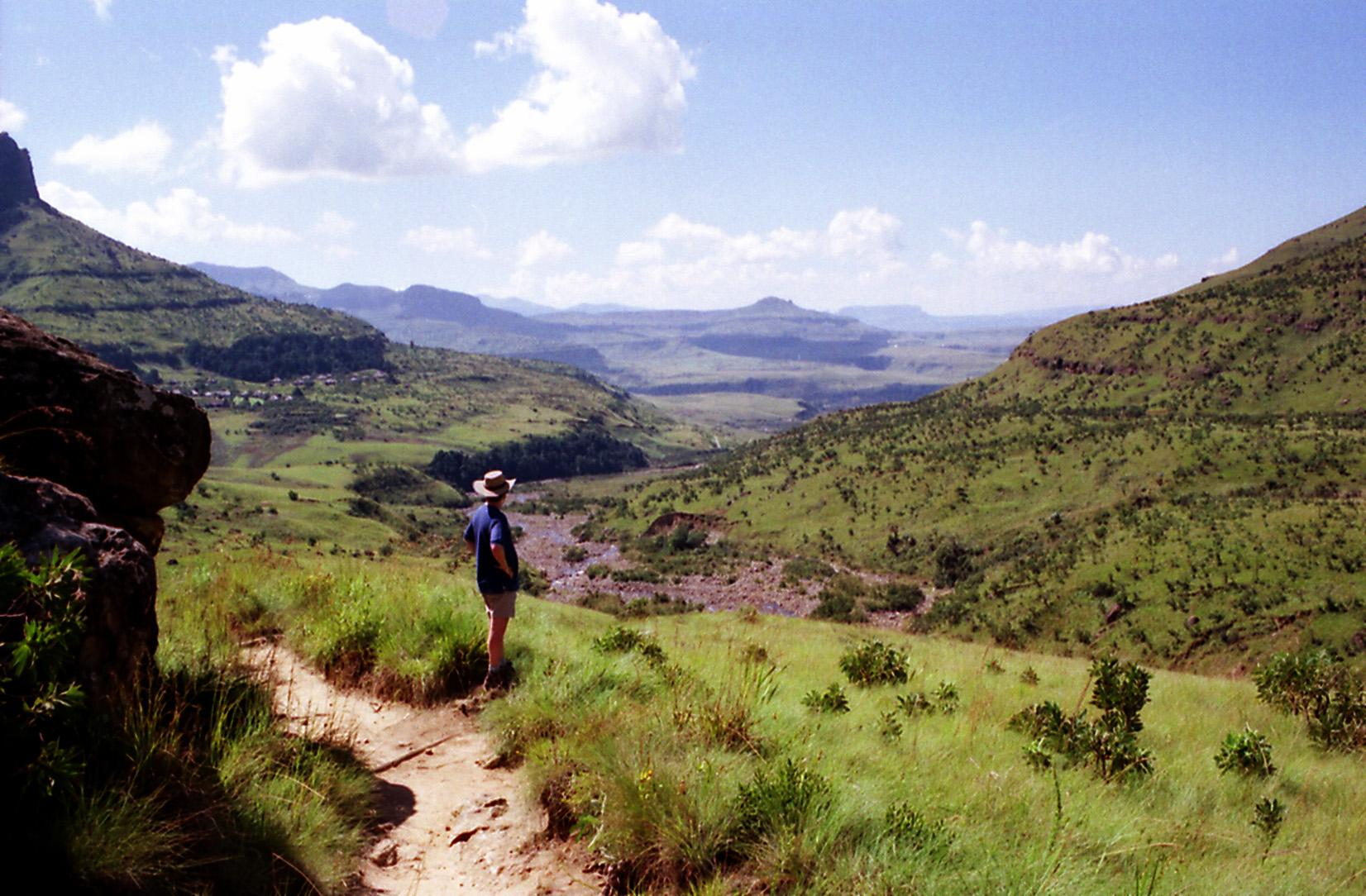
Trail in Royal Natal National Park

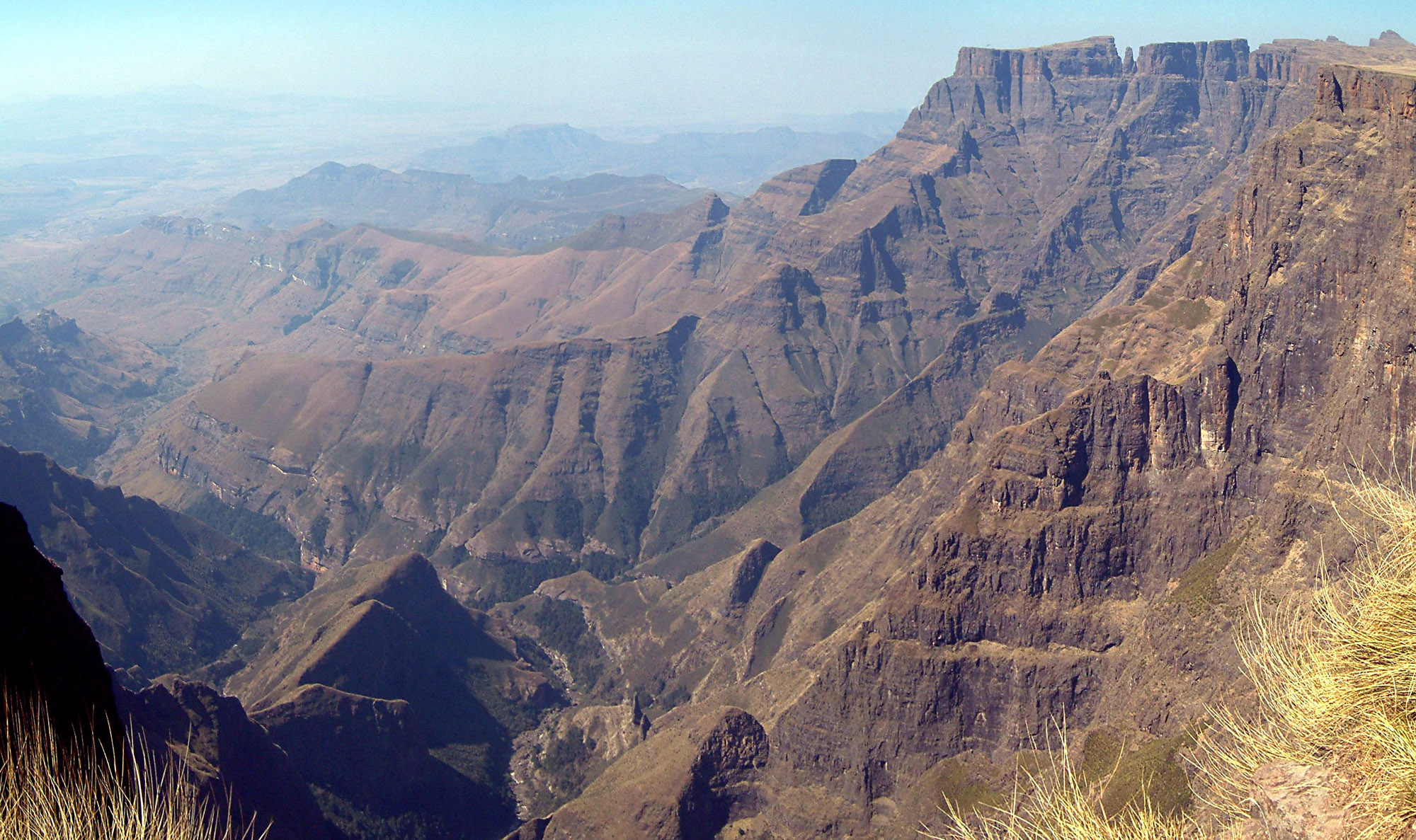
view towards the Amphitheatre

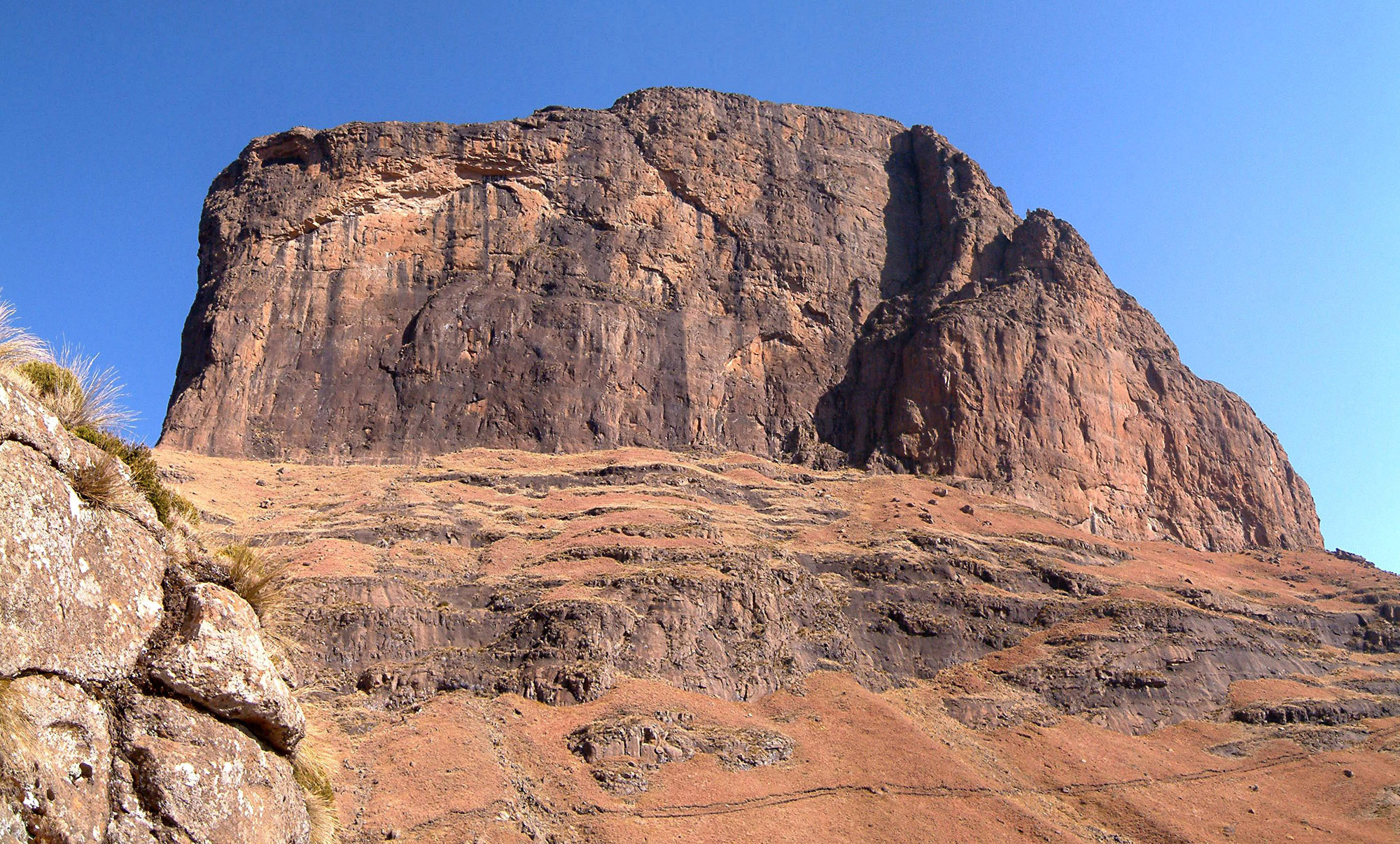
The Sentinel

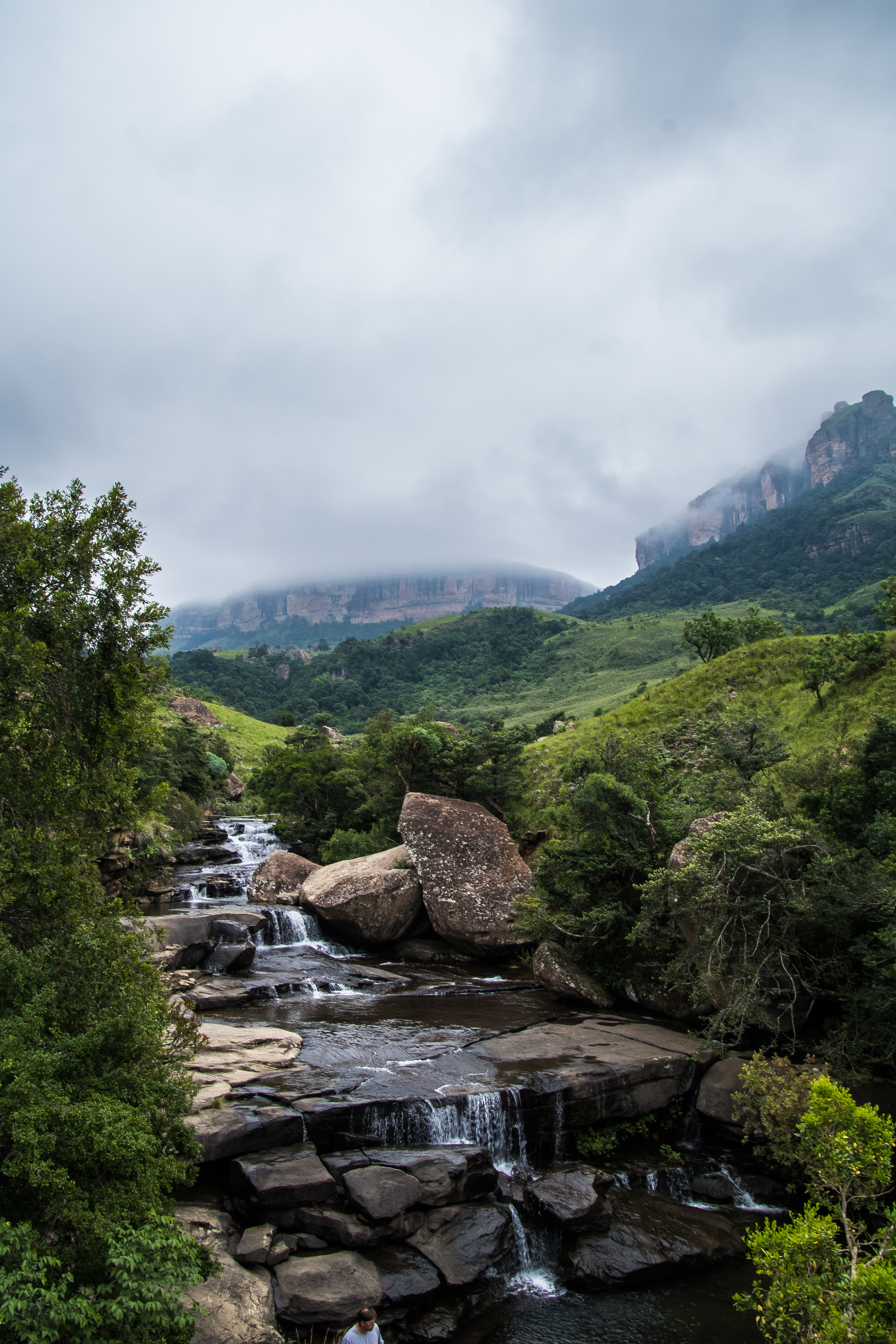
Mahai-River

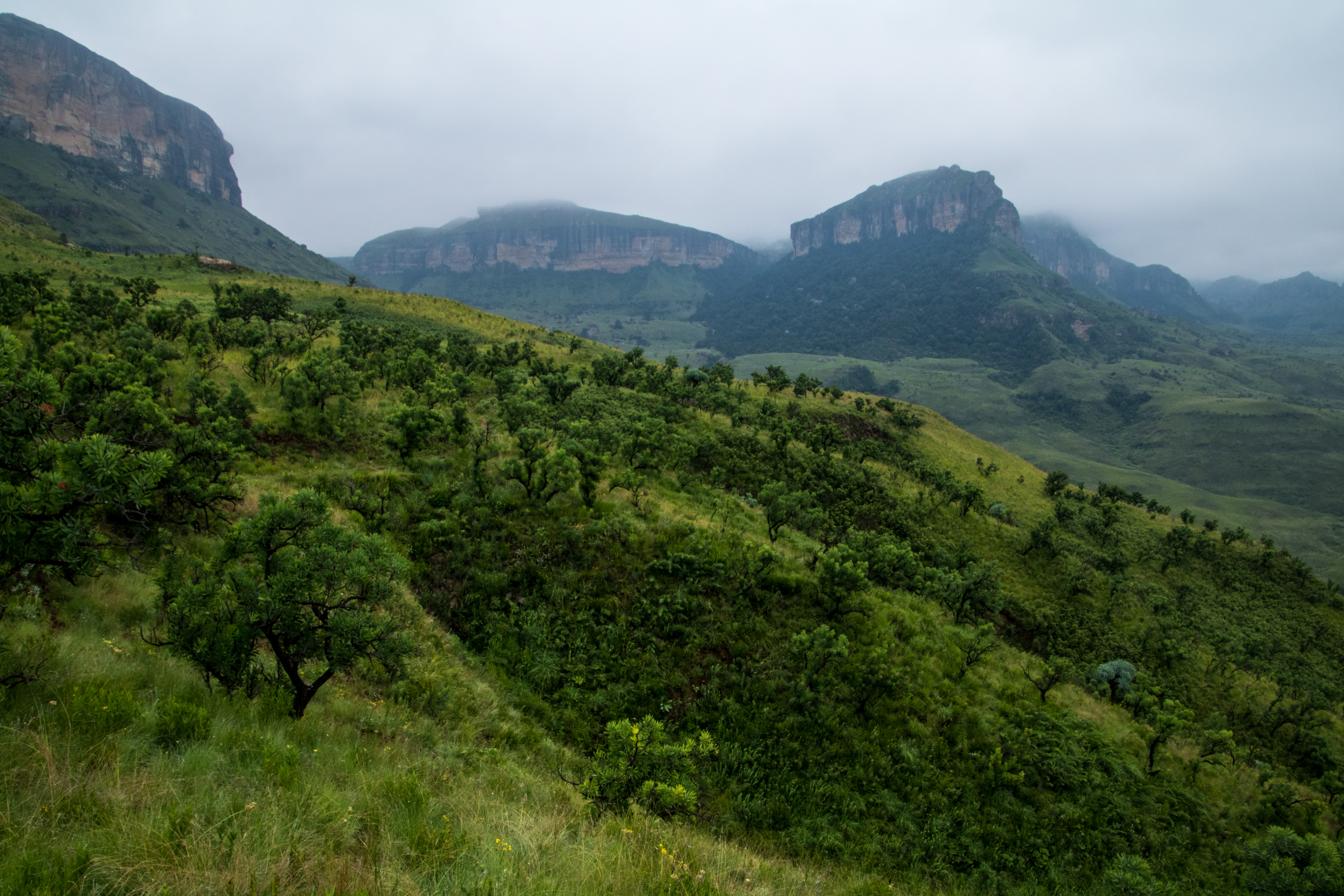
green covered Mountains

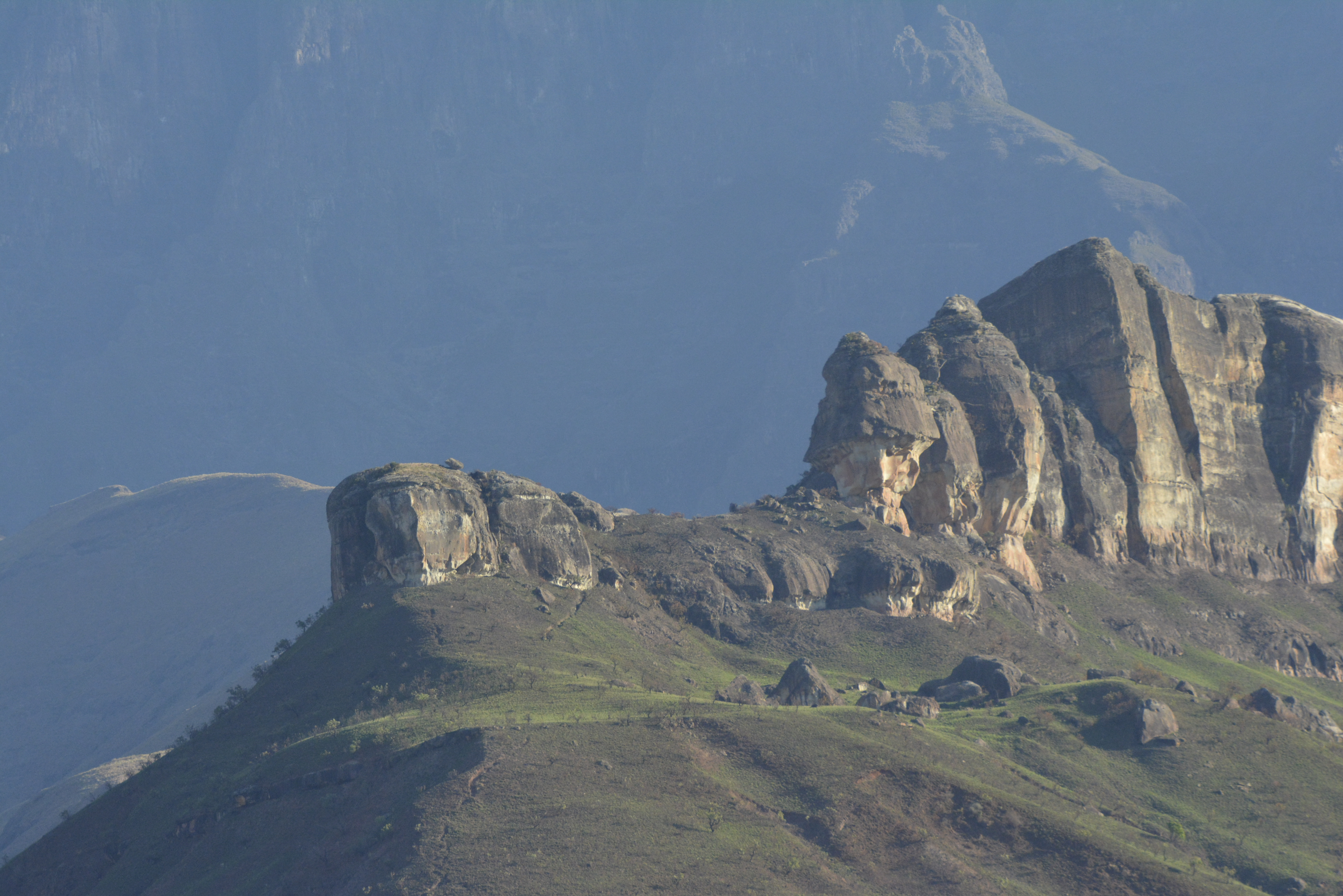
Policeman's Helmet

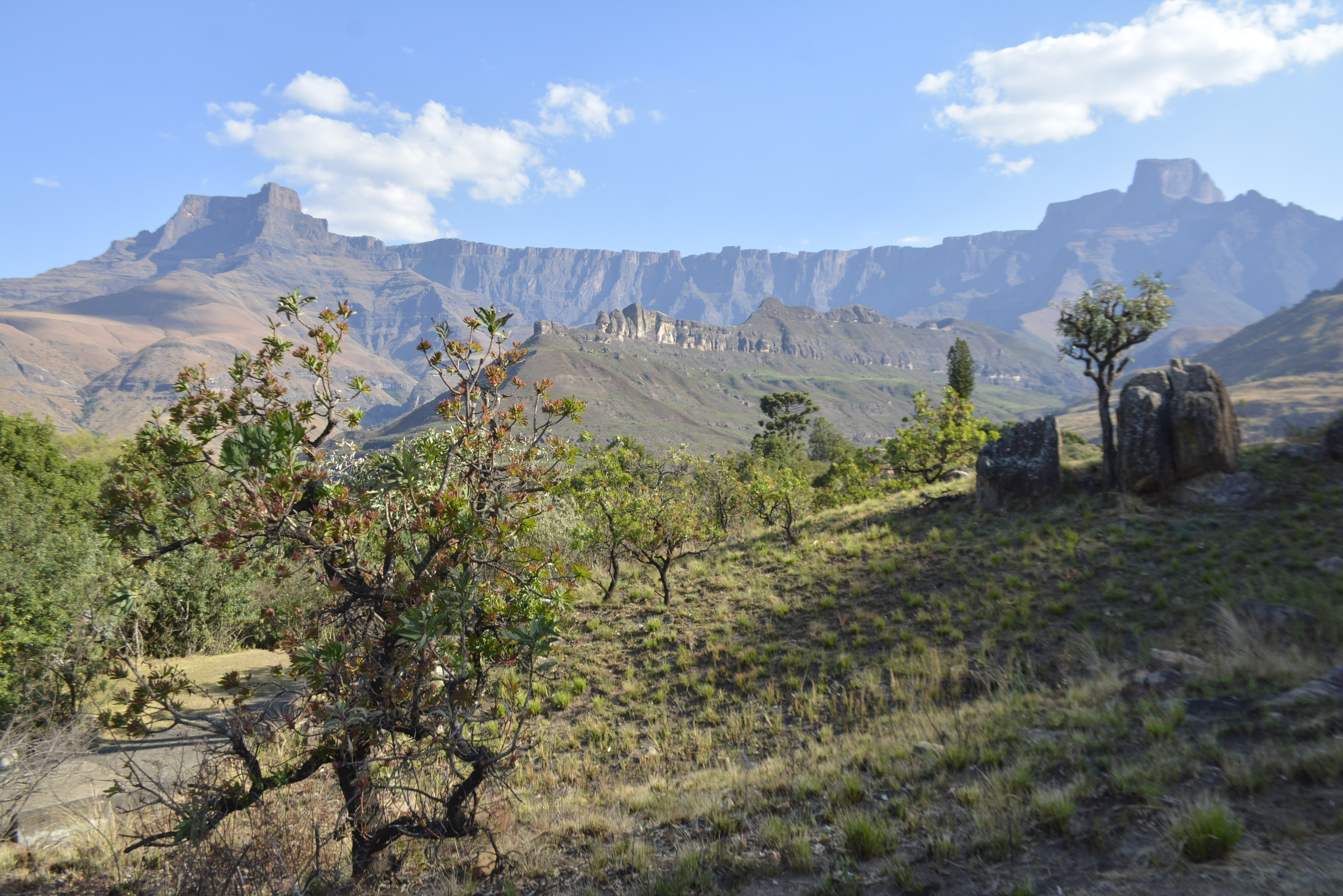
RNNP Amphitheatre

== See also ==
- Tugela Falls Bergville
- Ezemvelo KZN Wildlife
- List of conservation areas of South Africa
