= Laimes =

Laimes to Malchersch Farm, pre-war

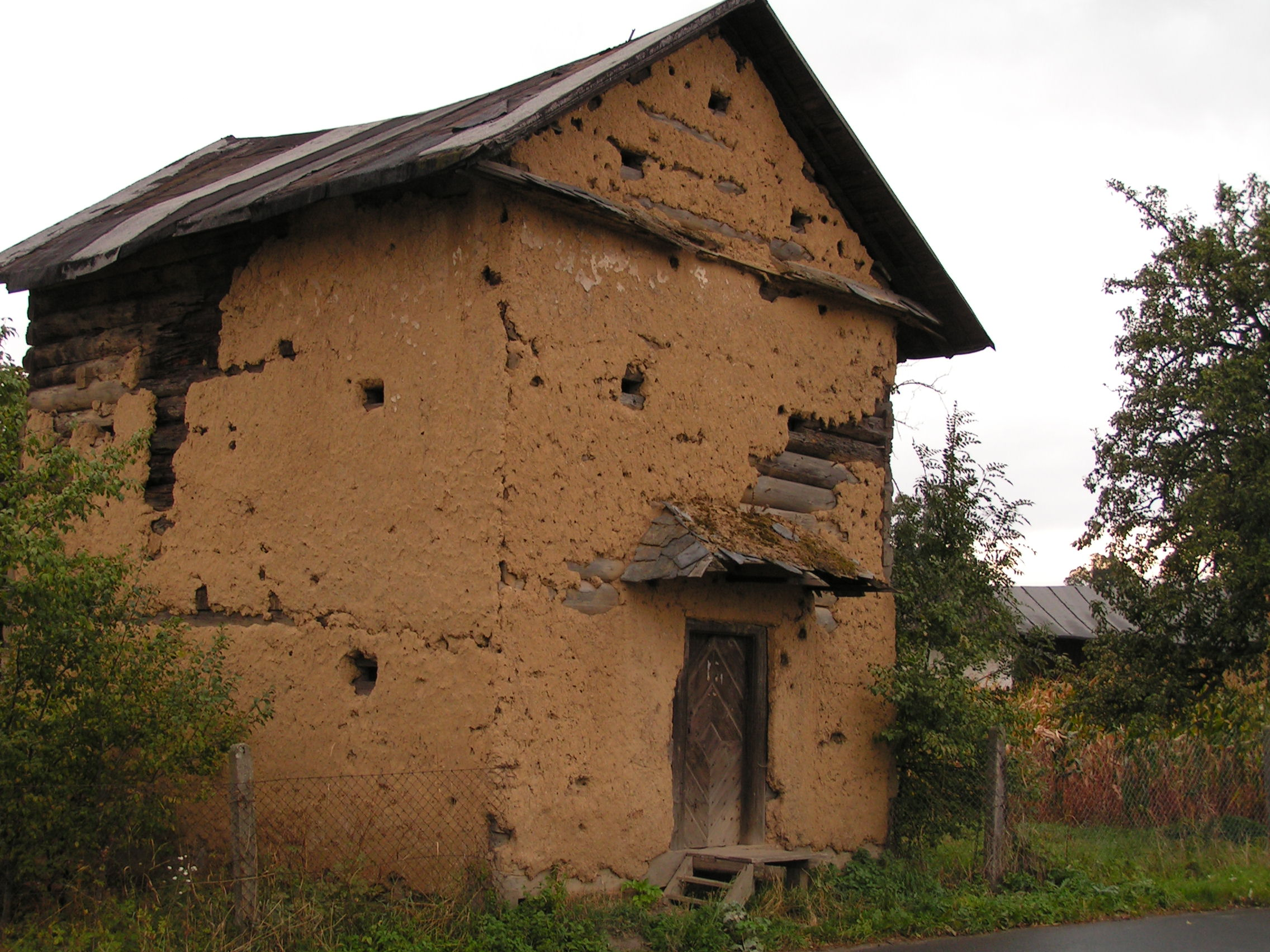
Laimes in Rozumice: Last example

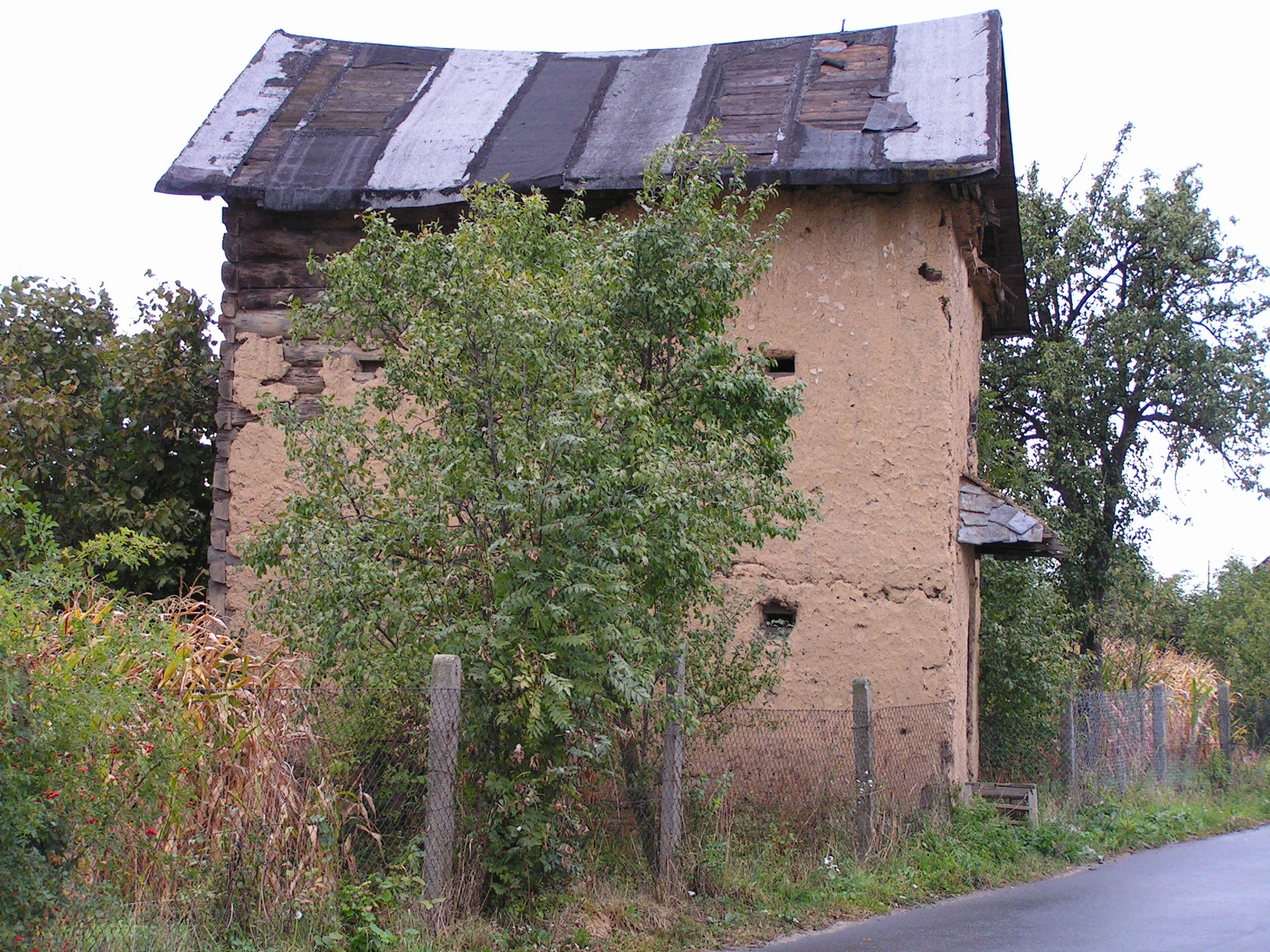
Laimes in Rozumice: Side View

Laimes also known as "Lehms", "Lehmhus", "Leimes" are clay daub faced granaries particular to Upper Silesia.

== Gallery ==
Typical street scene, pre-war

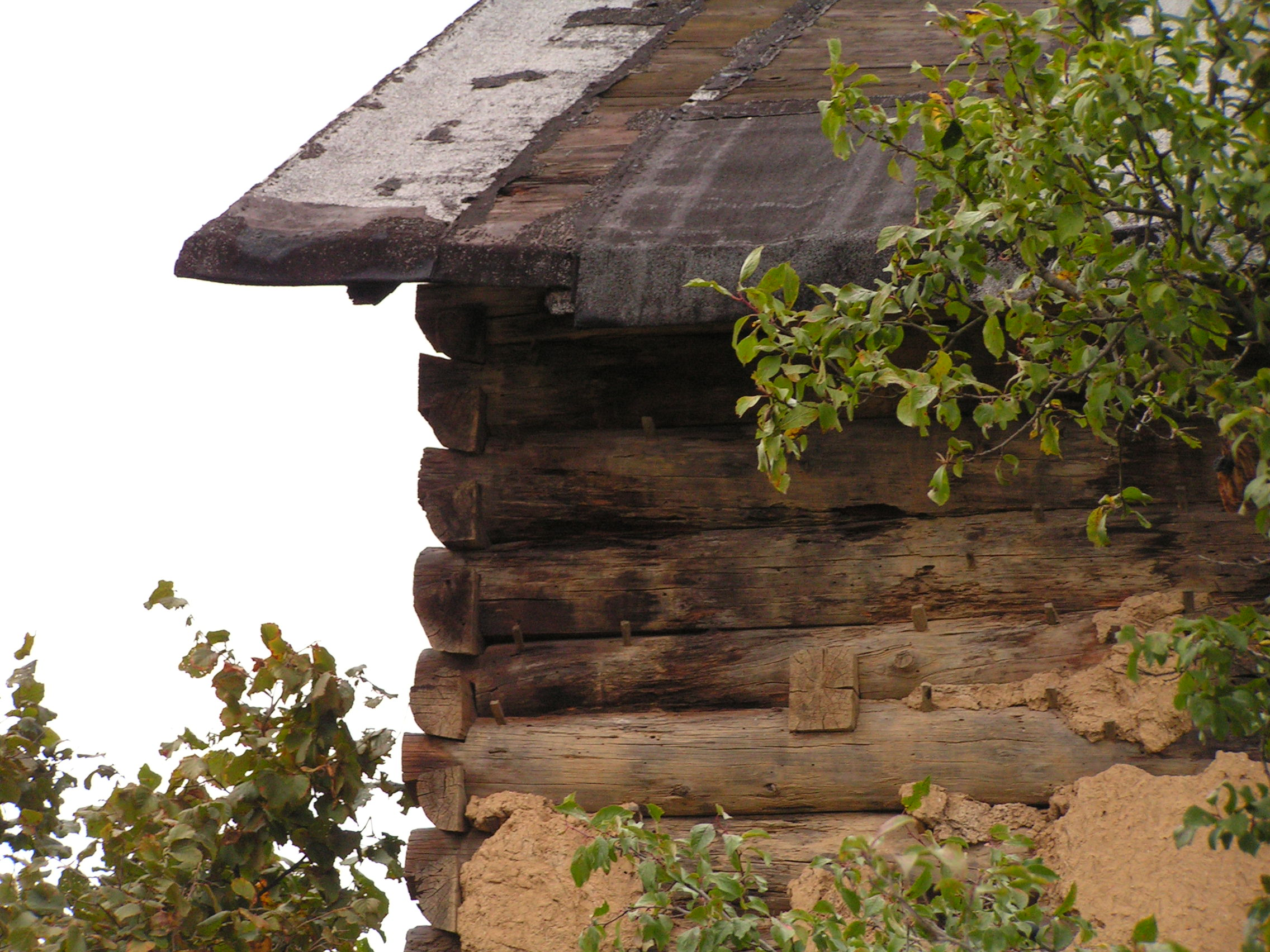
Laimes in Rozumice: construction detail

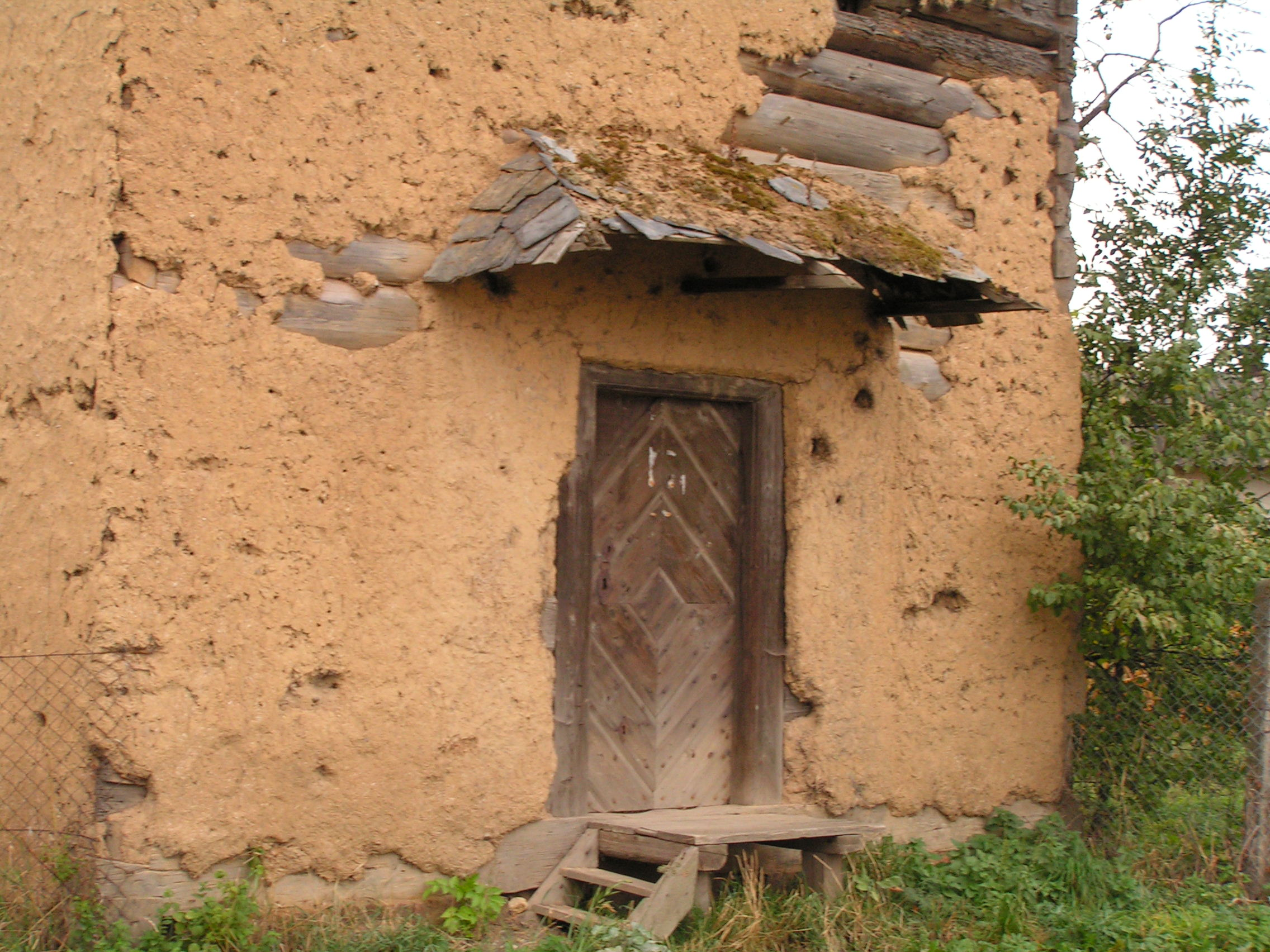
Laimes in Rozumice:Entrance
