= Churún River =

River in Venezuela

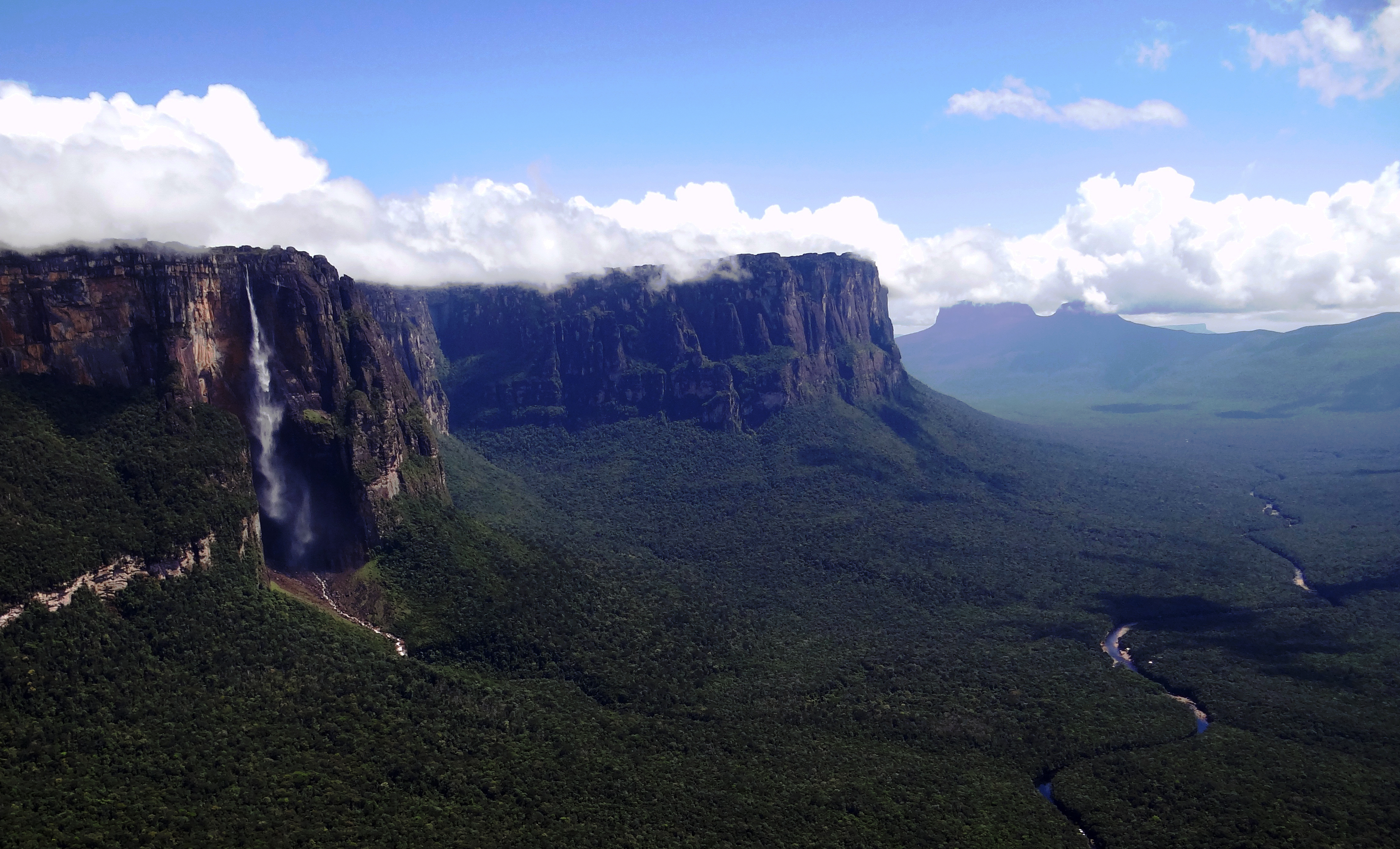
- Churún River, Cañón del Diablo and Angel Falls.

Location
- Country: Venezuela
- State: Bolívar

Physical characteristics
- Source: Auyán-tepui
  - coordinates: 5.8789°N 62.5867°W
  - elevation: 1,590 m (5,220 ft)
- Mouth: Carrao River
  - coordinates: 6°04′50″N 62°37′10″W
  - elevation: 450 m (1,480 ft)
- Length: 54.34 km (33.77 mi)
- Basin size: 580 km^{2} (220 sq mi)
- Discharge
  - average: 20,000 cu ft/s (570 m^{3}/s)

The Churún River (Spanish: Río Churún) is a river in Venezuela, part of the Orinoco River basin. It is located in Canaima National Park and a tributary comes from the Angel Falls, which are the world's tallest single-drop waterfall.

== Gallery ==
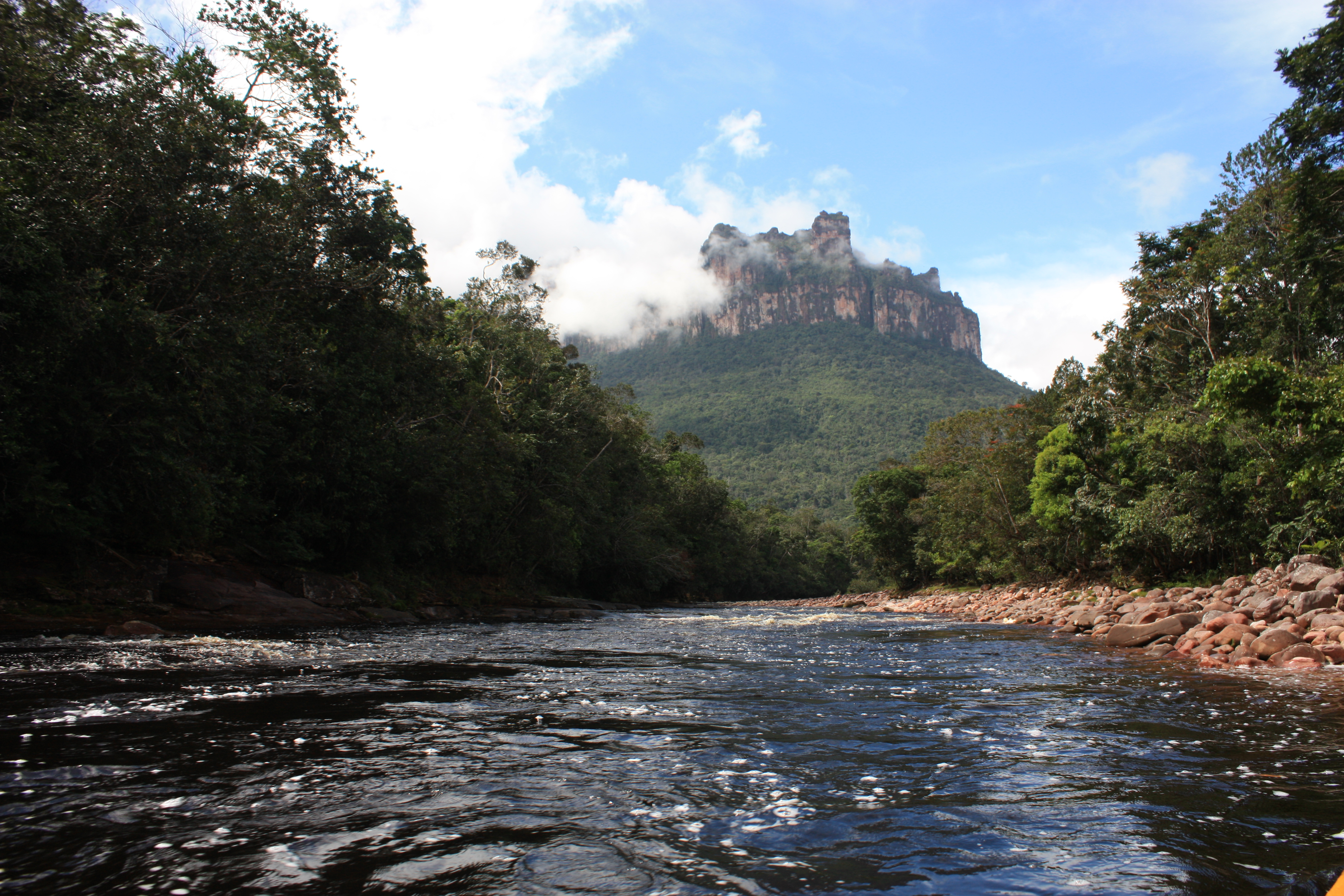
Rio Churun is the gateway to Angel Falls.
