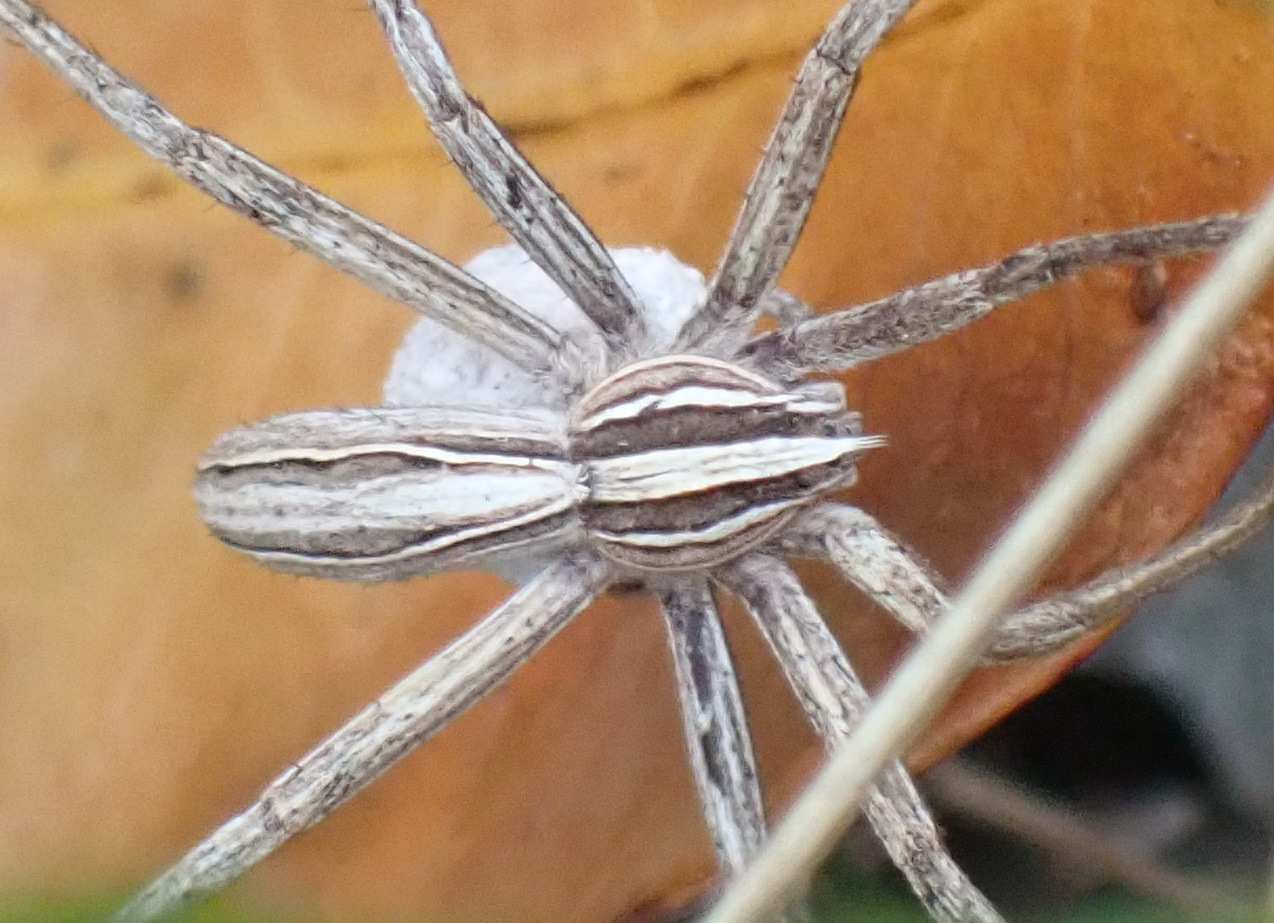

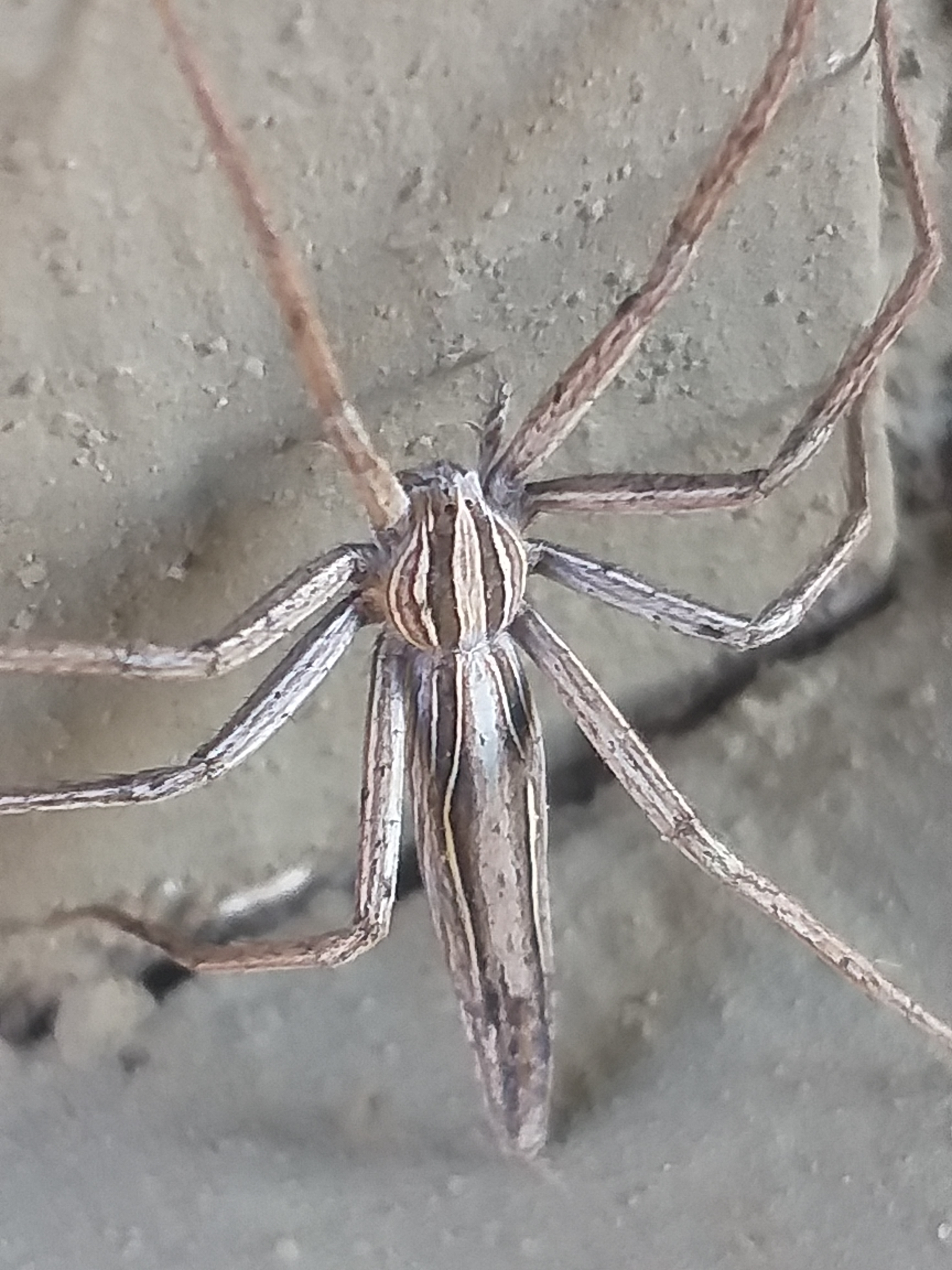

Scientific classification
- Kingdom: Animalia
- Phylum: Arthropoda
- Subphylum: Chelicerata
- Class: Arachnida
- Order: Araneae
- Infraorder: Araneomorphae
- Family: Pisauridae
- Genus: Chiasmopes
- Species: C. namaquensis

Binomial name
- Chiasmopes namaquensis (Roewer, 1955)

Synonyms
- Spencerella namaquensis Roewer, 1955

= Chiasmopes namaquensis =

Namaqua Chiasmopes nursery-web spider

Species of spider

Chiasmopes namaquensis is a species of spider in the family Pisauridae. It is found in Namibia and South Africa, and is commonly known as the Namaqua Chiasmopes nursery-web spider.

== Distribution ==
Chiasmopes namaquensis has been recorded from Namibia and South Africa.

South African localities include Mpetsane Conservation Estate in the Free State, Kruger National Park in Limpopo, and Avontuur, Kogelberg Biosphere Reserve and Table Mountain National Park Newlands Forest in the Western Cape.

== Habitat and ecology ==
The species is a sheet-web pisaurid that constructs webs in vegetation close to the ground, especially in short shrubs and bushes but occasionally also between grass tussocks. They are active at night.

C. namaquensis has been sampled from the Fynbos, Grassland and Savanna biomes at altitudes ranging from 7 to 1663 m.

== Conservation ==
Chiasmopes namaquensis is listed as Least Concern due to its wide geographical range. The species is protected in Mpetsane Conservation Estate, Kruger National Park and Table Mountain National Park. There are no significant threats to the species.

== Etymology ==
The species name namaquensis refers to Namaqualand, a region in Namibia and South Africa.

== Taxonomy ==
The species was originally described by Roewer in 1955 as Spencerella namaquensis from Namibia. It was transferred to Chiasmopes by Blandin in 1977. The species is known only from the female and has been revised by Blandin (1977).
