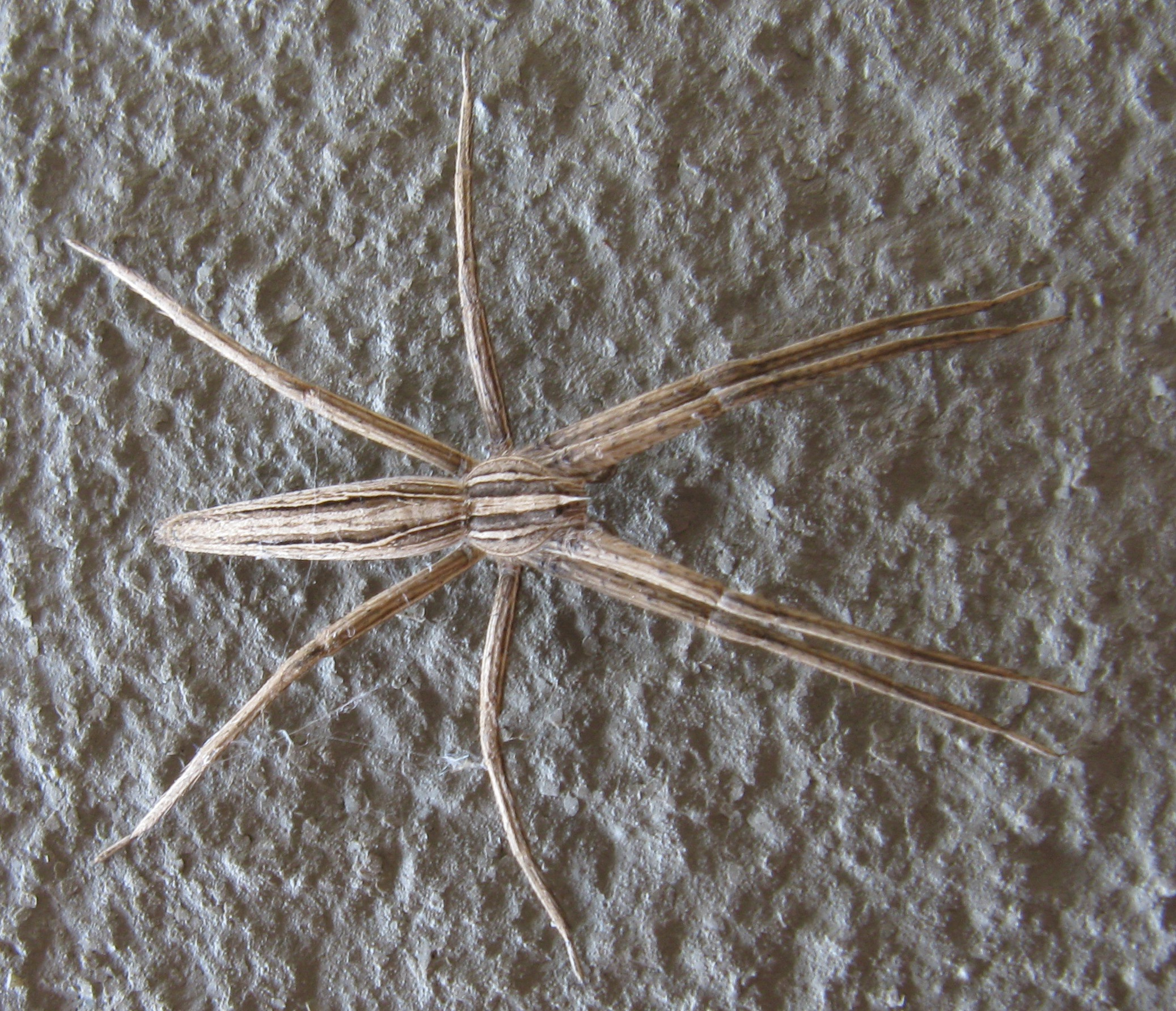
- C. lineatus
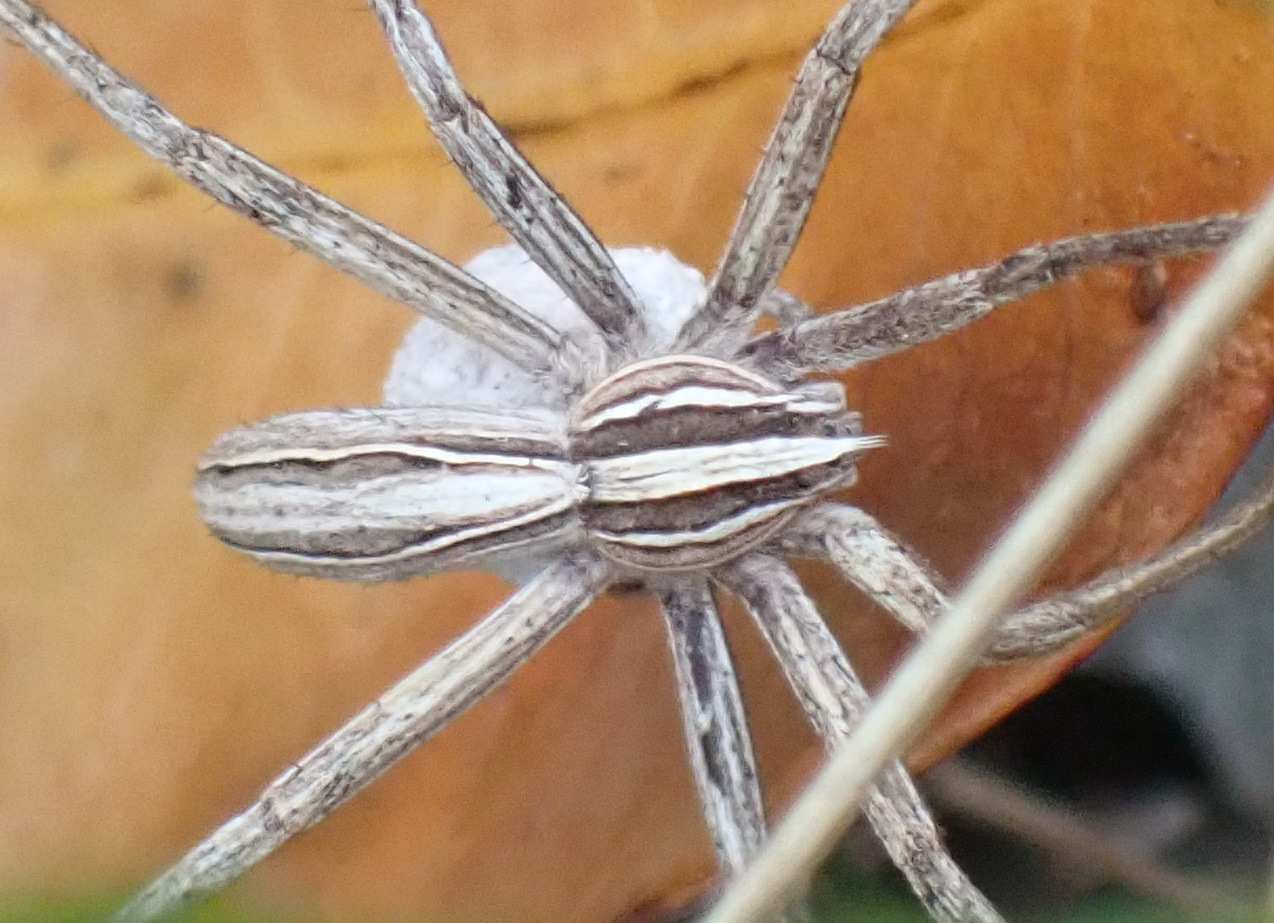
- female C. namaquensis with egg sac

Scientific classification
- Kingdom: Animalia
- Phylum: Arthropoda
- Subphylum: Chelicerata
- Class: Arachnida
- Order: Araneae
- Infraorder: Araneomorphae
- Family: Pisauridae
- Genus: Chiasmopes; Pavesi, 1883

Species
- 4, see text

= Chiasmopes =

Genus of spiders

Chiasmopes is an African genus of nursery web spiders that was first described by Pietro Pavesi in 1883.

== Distribution ==
All four described species are found in South Africa, with one species appearing as far north as Ethiopia.

== Description ==
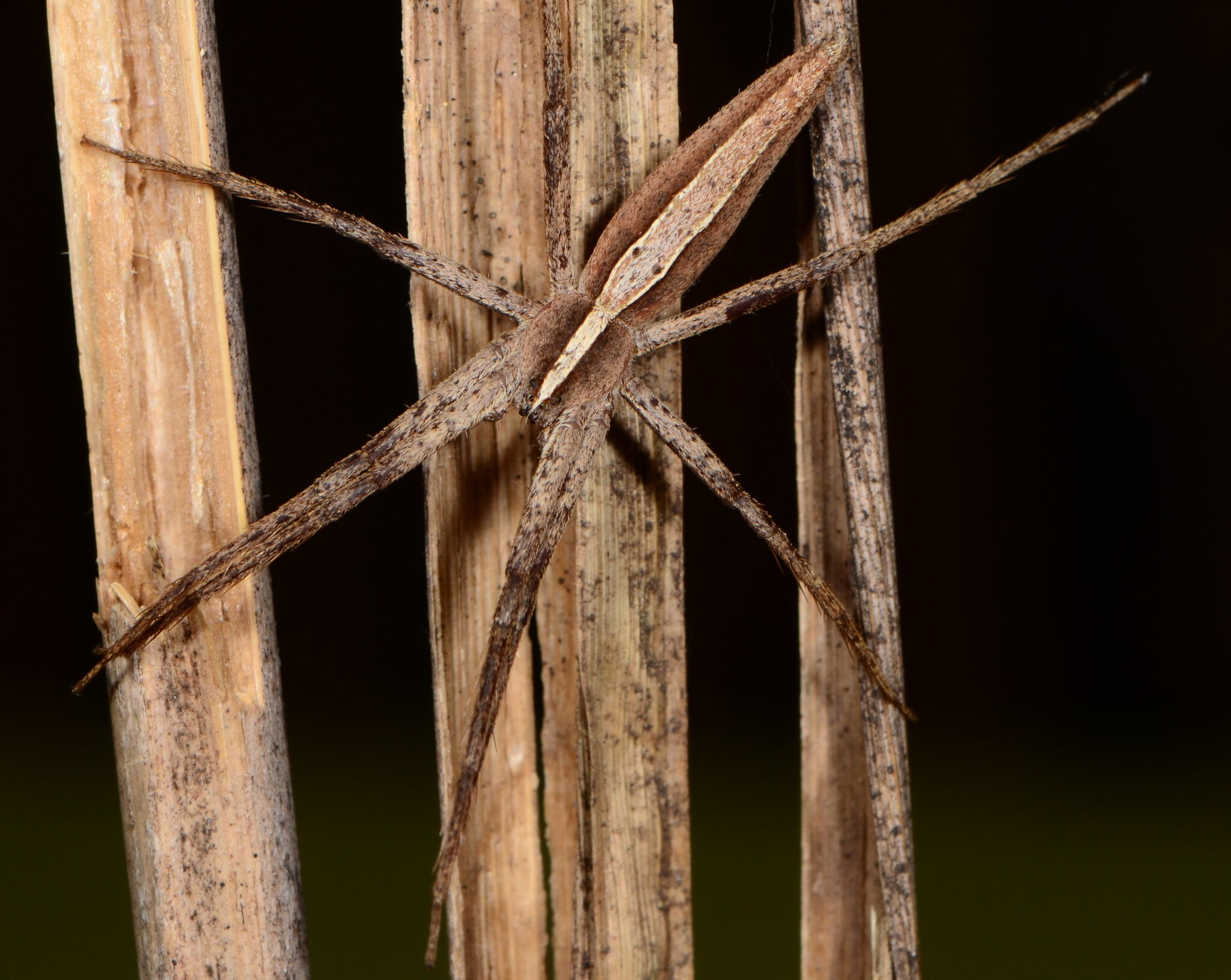
female C. lineatus

Chiasmopes species measure 10 to 13 mm in total length.

The carapace is longer than wide and decorated with symmetrical patterns or longitudinal stripes. Eight eyes are arranged in four rows. The anterior row is very strongly procurved, with the anterior lateral eyes close together on shallow tubercles on the edge of the clypeus. The median eyes are smallest. A median band of pale hairs runs out into a crest between the eyes. The posterior margin of the chelicerae has three teeth.

The abdomen is elongate-oval and tapers posteriorly, being nearly four times as long as broad. The legs are relatively long, with the leg formula 1243, and are slightly laterigrade with numerous spines. Leg colour is variable, ranging from uniformly yellow to dark brown, or mottled brown with dark bands. All legs have three claws.

== Taxonomy ==
The genus Chiasmopes was described by Pavesi in 1883 and has been revised by Blandin (1977). It is the senior synonym of Spencerella Pocock, 1898.

== Species ==
As of October 2025, this genus includes four species:

- Chiasmopes hystrix (Berland, 1922) – Ethiopia, South Africa
- Chiasmopes lineatus (Pocock, 1898) – DR Congo, Uganda, Tanzania, South Africa, Eswatini
- Chiasmopes namaquensis (Roewer, 1955) – Namibia, South Africa
- Chiasmopes signatus (Pocock, 1902) – South Africa
