= Chiasmopes hystrix =

Ethiopia Chiasmopes nursery-web spider

Scientific classification
- Kingdom: Animalia
- Phylum: Arthropoda
- Subphylum: Chelicerata
- Class: Arachnida
- Order: Araneae
- Infraorder: Araneomorphae
- Family: Pisauridae
- Genus: Chiasmopes
- Species: C. hystrix

Binomial name
- Chiasmopes hystrix (Berland, 1922)

Synonyms
- Maypacius hystrix Berland, 1922; Spencerella hystrix Roewer, 1955

Species of spider

Chiasmopes hystrix is a species of spider in the family Pisauridae. It is found in Ethiopia and South Africa, and is commonly known as the Ethiopia Chiasmopes nursery-web spider.

== Distribution ==
Chiasmopes hystrix has been recorded from Ethiopia and South Africa. In South Africa, it has been sampled from a single female in Ohrigstad, Mpumalanga at 1080 m altitude.

== Habitat and ecology ==
The species is a sheet-web pisaurid that constructs webs in vegetation close to the ground, especially in short shrubs and bushes, but occasionally also between grass tussocks. It has been sampled from the Grassland and Savanna biomes.

== Description ==
The cephalothorax is decorated in the middle with a light fawn band, covered with very white hairs, attenuated in front where it is extended by a brush of white hairs between the posterior median eyes. The sides of this band are of a darker fawn, veined black.

The chelicerae are fawn-red, more or less spotted with black, as are the maxillary blades. The sternum has a median white line with two blackish bands on the sides of this line.

The legs have dark femora, with the other segments fawn, and the two anterior pairs black. The abdomen is grey, striped fawn and stained black. The pubescence is white and grey, silky and felted. On the sternum there are black setae, and in the middle of the pubescence on the legs and abdomen there are small stiff setae.

== Conservation ==
Chiasmopes hystrix is listed as Least Concern due to its wide geographical range. However, more sampling is needed to confirm the presence of the species in South Africa. There are no significant threats to the species.

== Etymology ==
The species name hystrix is Latin for "porcupine".

== Taxonomy ==
The species was originally described by Berland in 1922 as Maypacius hystrix from Ethiopia. It was transferred to Chiasmopes by Blandin in 1974. The species is known only from the female and has been revised by Blandin (1977).
