= Chiasmopes signatus =

Grahamstown Chiasmopes nursery-web spider

Scientific classification
- Kingdom: Animalia
- Phylum: Arthropoda
- Subphylum: Chelicerata
- Class: Arachnida
- Order: Araneae
- Infraorder: Araneomorphae
- Family: Pisauridae
- Genus: Chiasmopes
- Species: C. signatus

Binomial name
- Chiasmopes signatus (Pocock, 1902)

Synonyms
- Spencerella signata Pocock, 1902

Species of spider

Chiasmopes signatus is a species of spider in the family Pisauridae. It is endemic to South Africa and is commonly known as the Grahamstown Chiasmopes nursery-web spider.

== Distribution ==
Chiasmopes signatus is endemic to the Eastern Cape, where it is presently known only from two localities at 552 m altitude.

The known localities are Grahamstown (now Makhanda) and Bathurst.

== Habitat and ecology ==
The species is a sheet-web spider sampled from the Thicket biome. Nothing more is known about their behaviour.

== Description ==
Chiasmopes signatus is distinguished from Chiasmopes lineatus from Durban by having the anterior lateral eyes two diameters instead of one diameter apart, the anterior medians about a diameter instead of half a diameter apart, and only equal to the radius of the posterior medians.

== Conservation ==
Chiasmopes signatus is listed as Data Deficient. The status of the species remains obscure. More sampling is needed to determine the species range. Threats to the species are unknown.

== Taxonomy ==
The species was originally described by Reginald Innes Pocock in 1902 as Spencerella signata from Grahamstown in the Eastern Cape. It was transferred to Chiasmopes by Blandin in 1974, who also described the male for the first time. The species is known from both sexes and has been revised by Blandin (1977).
