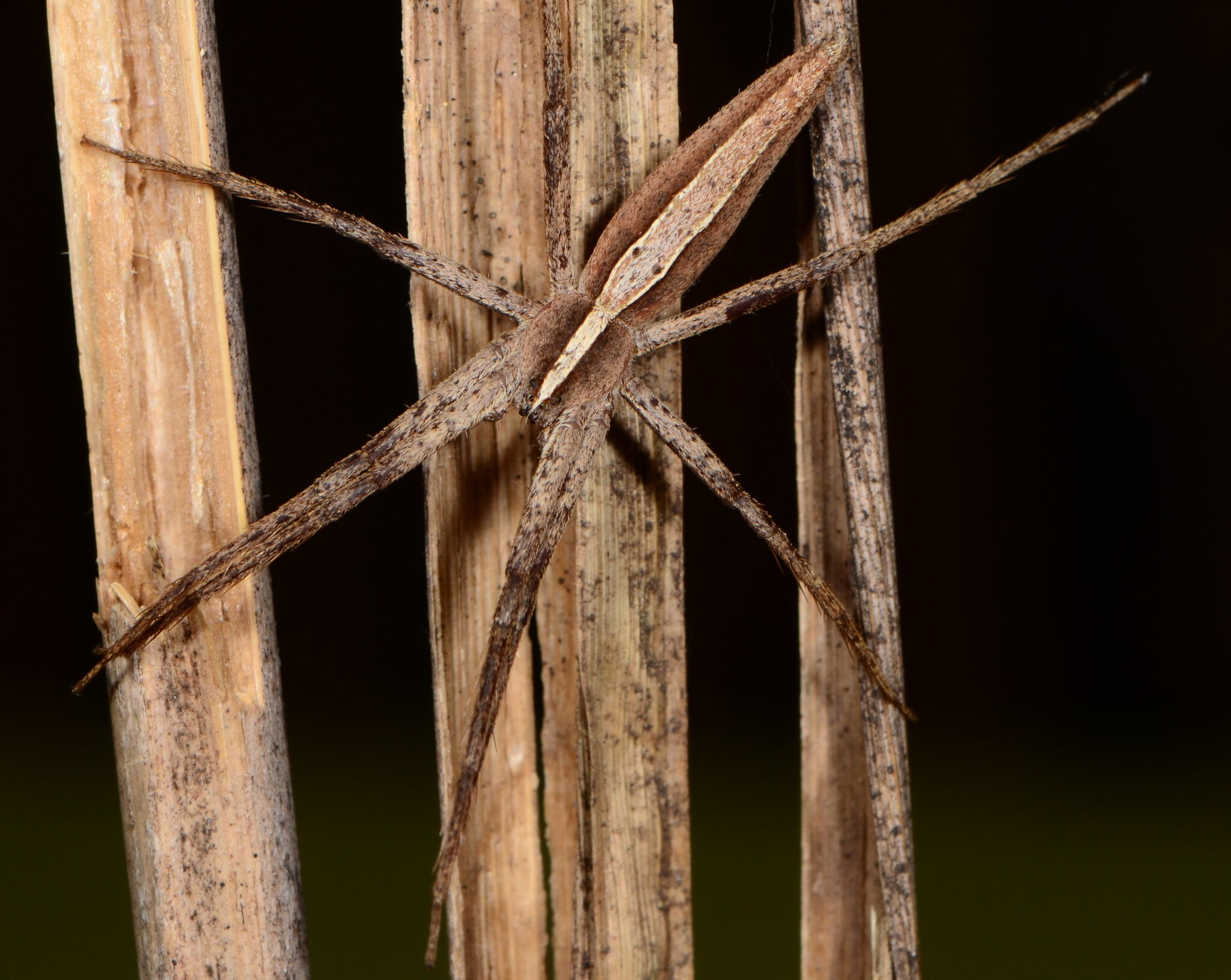
- female

Scientific classification
- Kingdom: Animalia
- Phylum: Arthropoda
- Subphylum: Chelicerata
- Class: Arachnida
- Order: Araneae
- Infraorder: Araneomorphae
- Family: Pisauridae
- Genus: Chiasmopes
- Species: C. lineatus

Binomial name
- Chiasmopes lineatus (Pocock, 1898)

Synonyms
- Spencerella lineata Pocock, 1898; Spencerella sexmaculata Roewer, 1955; Chiasmopes sexmaculatus Dippenaar-Schoeman et al., 2020

= Chiasmopes lineatus =

Striped Chiasmopes nursery-web spider

Species of spider

Chiasmopes lineatus is a species of spider in the family Pisauridae. It is found in several African countries and is commonly known as the striped Chiasmopes nursery-web spider.

== Distribution ==
Chiasmopes lineatus has been recorded from the Democratic Republic of the Congo, Tanzania, Uganda, Eswatini and South Africa.

In South Africa, it has been recorded from seven provinces. Localities include Humansdorp, Mazeppa Bay, Thyspunt, Addo Elephant National Park and Hogsback in the Eastern Cape, Sterkfontein Dam Nature Reserve in the Free State, multiple sites in Gauteng, several locations in KwaZulu-Natal including Dukuduku Forest Station and Tembe Elephant Park, Graskop and Wakkerstroom in Mpumalanga, and multiple sites in the Western Cape including Fernkloof Nature Reserve and Kogelberg Biosphere Reserve.

== Habitat and ecology ==
The species is a sheet-web pisaurid that constructs webs in vegetation close to the ground, especially in short shrubs and bushes but occasionally also between longer grass tussocks. The sheet-web consists of many criss-crossing silk threads. They are active at night.

The species has been sampled from the Fynbos, Forest, Grassland, Savanna and Thicket biomes at altitudes ranging from 17 to 2102 m, and has also been sampled from maize fields.

== Conservation ==
Chiasmopes lineatus is listed as Least Concern due to its wide geographical range. The species is protected in more than 10 protected areas in South Africa. There are no significant threats to the species.

== Etymology ==
The species name lineatus is Latin for "striped" or "lined".

== Taxonomy ==
The species was originally described by Reginald Innes Pocock in 1898 as Spencerella lineata from Durban in South Africa. It was transferred to Chiasmopes by Blandin in 1977, who also synonymized Spencerella sexmaculata Lessert, 1916 (elevated from a subspecies by Roewer in 1955) with this species. The species is known from both sexes and has been revised by Blandin (1977).
