= Baviaans Local Municipality elections =

The council of the Baviaans Local Municipality was elected in 2000, 2006 and 2011. The first two elections were conducted by a system of party-list proportional representation, while the 2011 election used mixed-member proportional representation. In 2016 the Baviaans Local Municipality was merged with two others to create the Dr Beyers Naudé Local Municipality; for election results in the merged municipality see Dr Beyers Naudé Local Municipality elections.

== Results ==
The following table shows the composition of the council after past elections.

Event	ANC	DA	Other	Total
2000 election	2	3	0	5
2002 floor-crossing	4	1	0	5
2006 election	2	3	0	5
2011 election	3	4	—	7

== 2000 elections ==
The Baviaans Local Municipality was created in 2000, replacing the transitional local councils of Willowmore and Steytlerville. The council consisted of five members; the Democratic Alliance (DA) obtained a majority of three.

Party	Votes	%	Seats
Democratic Alliance	2,234	50.68	3
African National Congress	2,063	46.80	2
United Democratic Movement	111	2.52	0
Total	4,408	100.00	5
Valid votes	4,408	98.31	
Invalid/blank votes	76	1.69	
Total votes	4,484	100.00	
Registered voters/turnout	6,436	69.67	

=== October 2002 floor crossing ===
In terms of the Eighth Amendment of the Constitution and the judgment of the Constitutional Court in United Democratic Movement v President of the Republic of South Africa and Others, in the period from 8–22 October 2002 councillors had the opportunity to cross the floor to a different political party without losing their seats. In the Baviaans council, two councillors crossed from the DA to the African National Congress (ANC), giving the ANC a majority of four.

Party	Seats before	Net change	Seats after
African National Congress	2	▲2	4
Democratic Alliance	3	▼2	1

== 2006 elections ==
The DA obtained a majority of three out of the five members.

Party	Votes	%	Seats
Democratic Alliance	2,170	47.31	3
African National Congress	2,136	46.57	2
Independent Democrats	281	6.13	0
Total	4,587	100.00	5
Valid votes	4,587	98.90	
Invalid/blank votes	51	1.10	
Total votes	4,638	100.00	
Registered voters/turnout	7,572	61.25	

== 2011 elections ==
At the time of this election the council was expanded to seven members, and the municipality was demarcated into four wards. Four councillors were elected by first-past-the-post voting from the wards, while the other three were appointed from party lists so that the total number of party representatives was proportional to the number of votes received. The DA obtained a majority of four members.

Party	Ward			List			Total seats
Party	Votes	%	Seats	Votes	%	Seats	Total seats
Democratic Alliance	3,644	55.50	3	3,629	55.24	1	4
African National Congress	2,922	44.50	1	2,940	44.76	2	3
Total	6,566	100.00	4	6,569	100.00	3	7
Valid votes	6,566	98.75		6,569	98.71		
Invalid/blank votes	83	1.25		86	1.29		
Total votes	6,649	100.00		6,655	100.00		
Registered voters/turnout	9,321	71.33		9,321	71.40		
