= Ikwezi Local Municipality elections =

The council of the Ikwezi Local Municipality was elected in 2000, 2006 and 2011. The first two elections were conducted by a system of party-list proportional representation, while the 2011 election used mixed-member proportional representation. In 2016 the Ikwezi Local Municipality was merged with two others to create the Dr Beyers Naudé Local Municipality; for election results in the merged municipality see Dr Beyers Naudé Local Municipality elections.

== Results ==
The following table shows the composition of the council after past elections.

Event	ANC	DA	JKA	Other	Total
2000 election	3	—	2	—	5
2002 floor-crossing	3	—	1	1	5
2004 floor-crossing	4	—	1	0	5
2006 election	3	1	1	—	5
2011 election	5	2	—	0	7

== 2000 elections ==
The Ikwezi Local Municipality was created in 2000, replacing the transitional local councils of Willowmore and Steytlerville. The council consisted of five members; the ANC obtained a majority of three.

Party	Votes	%	Seats
African National Congress	1,979	65.42	3
Jansenville Klipplaat Alliansie	1,046	34.58	2
Total	3,025	100.00	5
Valid votes	3,025	97.77	
Invalid/blank votes	69	2.23	
Total votes	3,094	100.00	
Registered voters/turnout	4,692	65.94	

=== October 2002 floor crossing ===
In terms of the Eighth Amendment of the Constitution and the judgment of the Constitutional Court in United Democratic Movement v President of the Republic of South Africa and Others, in the period from 8–22 October 2002 councillors had the opportunity to cross the floor to a different political party without losing their seats. In the Ikwezi council, one councillor crossed from the "Jansenville Klipplaat Alliansie" to the New National Party (NNP).

Party	Seats before	Net change	Seats after
African National Congress	3	0	3
Jansenville Klipplaat Alliansie	2	▼1	1
New National Party	–	▲1	1

=== September 2004 floor crossing ===
Another floor-crossing period occurred on 1–15 September 2004, in which the NNP councillor crossed to the ANC.

Party	Seats before	Net change	Seats after
African National Congress	3	▲1	4
Jansenville Klipplaat Alliansie	1	0	1
New National Party	1	▼1	0

== 2006 elections ==
The ANC obtained a majority of three out of the five members.

Party	Votes	%	Seats
African National Congress	2,247	69.24	3
Jansenville Klipplaat Alliansie	593	18.27	1
Democratic Alliance	405	12.48	1
Total	3,245	100.00	5
Valid votes	3,245	98.60	
Invalid/blank votes	46	1.40	
Total votes	3,291	100.00	
Registered voters/turnout	5,539	59.42	

== 2011 elections ==
At the time of this election the council was expanded to seven members, and the municipality was demarcated into four wards. Four councillors were elected by first-past-the-post voting from the wards, while the other three were appointed from party lists so that the total number of party representatives was proportional to the number of votes received. The ANC obtained a majority of five members.

Party	Ward			List			Total seats
Party	Votes	%	Seats	Votes	%	Seats	Total seats
African National Congress	2,346	65.94	4	2,356	66.05	1	5
Democratic Alliance	1,044	29.34	0	1,211	33.95	2	2
Independent candidates	168	4.72	0				0
Total	3,558	100.00	4	3,567	100.00	3	7
Valid votes	3,558	98.29		3,567	98.32		
Invalid/blank votes	62	1.71		61	1.68		
Total votes	3,620	100.00		3,628	100.00		
Registered voters/turnout	5,729	63.19		5,729	63.33		
