= Ethnic groups in South Africa by municipality =

Ethnic groups in South Africa by municipality details the ethnic composition of South Africa by municipality, according to the 2011 census.

Municipality	Province	African	Coloured	Indian or Asian	White	Other
Camdeboo Local Municipality	Eastern Cape	24.8	64.8	0.4	9.6	0.4
Blue Crane Route Local Municipality	Eastern Cape	59.0	33.0	0.3	6.8	0.8
Ikwezi Local Municipality	Eastern Cape	37.2	54.6	0.2	7.6	0.5
Makana Local Municipality	Eastern Cape	78.0	12.1	0.7	8.7	0.6
Ndlambe Local Municipality	Eastern Cape	77.7	7.3	0.2	14.2	0.5
Sundays River Valley Local Municipality	Eastern Cape	71.8	21.4	0.2	5.9	0.8
Baviaans Local Municipality	Eastern Cape	12.0	80.3	0.2	7.0	0.6
Kouga Local Municipality	Eastern Cape	38.8	42.6	0.2	17.6	0.7
Kou-Kamma Local Municipality	Eastern Cape	30.6	59.8	0.3	8.2	1.1
Mbhashe Local Municipality	Eastern Cape	99.4	0.1	0.1	0.2	0.1
Mnquma Local Municipality	Eastern Cape	99.4	0.2	0.1	0.2	0.1
Great Kei Local Municipality	Eastern Cape	91.3	1.3	0.1	7.1	0.2
Amahlathi Local Municipality	Eastern Cape	96.5	1.2	0.1	2.0	0.2
Ngqushwa Local Municipality	Eastern Cape	99.2	0.2	0.1	0.4	0.1
Nkonkobe Local Municipality	Eastern Cape	94.5	4.0	0.2	1.0	0.3
Nxuba Local Municipality	Eastern Cape	73.5	20.6	0.3	4.9	0.7
Inxuba Yethemba Local Municipality	Eastern Cape	56.2	32.2	0.3	10.5	0.8
Tsolwana Local Municipality	Eastern Cape	91.0	5.8	0.1	2.8	0.3
Inkwanca Local Municipality	Eastern Cape	89.1	4.1	0.2	6.2	0.5
Lukanji Local Municipality	Eastern Cape	92.6	3.8	0.5	2.7	0.4
Intsika Yethu Local Municipality	Eastern Cape	99.4	0.2	0.1	0.1	0.1
Emalahleni Local Municipality	Eastern Cape	98.5	0.6	0.1	0.6	0.2
Engcobo Local Municipality	Eastern Cape	99.6	0.1	0.1	0.1	0.1
Sakhisizwe Local Municipality	Eastern Cape	97.7	0.8	0.2	1.1	0.2
Elundini Local Municipality	Eastern Cape	98.1	1.0	0.1	0.7	0.1
Senqu Local Municipality	Eastern Cape	97.3	1.2	0.2	1.1	0.2
Maletswai Local Municipality	Eastern Cape	85.3	7.4	0.2	6.7	0.4
Gariep Local Municipality	Eastern Cape	72.9	17.8	0.3	8.7	0.4
Ngquza Hill Local Municipality	Eastern Cape	99.2	0.4	0.1	0.1	0.1
Port St Johns Local Municipality	Eastern Cape	99.3	0.4	0.1	0.2	0.0
Nyandeni Local Municipality	Eastern Cape	99.4	0.3	0.1	0.1	0.1
Mhlontlo Local Municipality	Eastern Cape	99.4	0.2	0.1	0.2	0.1
King Sabata Dalindyebo Local Municipality	Eastern Cape	98.5	0.8	0.3	0.3	0.2
Matatiele Local Municipality	Eastern Cape	98.1	0.9	0.3	0.7	0.1
Umzimvubu Local Municipality	Eastern Cape	99.4	0.3	0.1	0.1	0.1
Mbizana Local Municipality	Eastern Cape	99.6	0.2	0.1	0.1	0.0
Ntabankulu Local Municipality	Eastern Cape	99.4	0.4	0.1	0.1	0.1
Buffalo City Metropolitan Municipality	Eastern Cape	85.1	6.0	0.8	7.7	0.3
Nelson Mandela Bay Metropolitan Municipality	Eastern Cape	60.1	23.6	1.1	14.4	0.8
Letsemeng Local Municipality	Free State	67.8	23.4	0.3	8.1	0.4
Kopanong Local Municipality	Free State	71.5	18.2	0.4	9.4	0.5
Mohokare Local Municipality	Free State	90.8	2.3	0.3	6.5	0.2
Naledi Local Municipality	Free State	92.4	1.9	0.5	4.9	0.3
Masilonyana Local Municipality	Free State	91.6	1.1	0.3	6.7	0.3
Tokologo Local Municipality	Free State	84.5	4.6	0.7	9.9	0.3
Tswelopele Local Municipality	Free State	91.2	1.2	0.4	6.9	0.3
Matjhabeng Local Municipality	Free State	87.7	2.1	0.4	9.6	0.2
Nala Local Municipality	Free State	93.1	0.6	0.3	5.8	0.2
Setsoto Local Municipality	Free State	92.3	1.0	0.8	5.7	0.2
Dihlabeng Local Municipality	Free State	87.4	1.5	0.5	10.4	0.2
Nketoana Local Municipality	Free State	91.4	0.3	0.2	7.8	0.2
Maluti a Phofung Local Municipality	Free State	98.2	0.2	0.2	1.3	0.1
Phumelela Local Municipality	Free State	91.6	0.4	0.3	7.3	0.3
Mantsopa Local Municipality	Free State	88.4	3.9	0.6	6.6	0.5
Moqhaka Local Municipality	Free State	87.2	2.9	0.3	9.3	0.3
Ngwathe Local Municipality	Free State	86.5	2.6	0.3	10.3	0.3
Metsimaholo Local Municipality	Free State	82.3	0.7	0.3	16.4	0.3
Mafube Local Municipality	Free State	91.9	0.6	0.3	7.0	0.2
Mangaung Metropolitan Municipality	Free State	83.3	5.0	0.4	11.0	0.3
Emfuleni Local Municipality	Gauteng	85.4	1.2	1.0	12.0	0.4
Midvaal Local Municipality	Gauteng	58.4	1.6	0.8	38.7	0.5
Lesedi Local Municipality	Gauteng	77.3	1.2	1.3	19.7	0.6
Mogale City Local Municipality	Gauteng	75.6	0.8	2.2	21.0	0.5
Randfontein Local Municipality	Gauteng	69.2	9.8	0.4	20.1	0.5
Westonaria Local Municipality	Gauteng	91.4	0.7	0.3	7.0	0.6
Merafong City Local Municipality	Gauteng	86.5	1.1	0.3	11.8	0.3
Ekurhuleni Metropolitan Municipality	Gauteng	78.7	2.7	2.1	15.8	0.6
City of Johannesburg Metropolitan Municipality	Gauteng	76.4	5.6	4.9	12.3	0.8
City of Tshwane Metropolitan Municipality	Gauteng	75.4	2.0	1.8	20.1	0.7
Umzumbe Local Municipality	KwaZulu-Natal	99.6	0.1	0.1	0.1	0.1
UMuziwabantu Local Municipality	KwaZulu-Natal	97.9	1.1	0.4	0.5	0.2
Ezingoleni Local Municipality	KwaZulu-Natal	98.7	0.2	0.2	0.8	0.1
Hibiscus Coast Local Municipality	KwaZulu-Natal	82.4	1.4	5.1	10.8	0.2
Vulamehlo Local Municipality	KwaZulu-Natal	98.9	0.2	0.5	0.3	0.1
Umdoni Local Municipality	KwaZulu-Natal	76.7	1.2	13.3	8.5	0.3
uMshwathi Local Municipality	KwaZulu-Natal	95.1	0.2	1.7	2.7	0.2
uMngeni Local Municipality	KwaZulu-Natal	75.0	1.5	3.8	19.4	0.3
Mpofana Local Municipality	KwaZulu-Natal	92.1	0.6	1.8	5.2	0.3
Impendle Local Municipality	KwaZulu-Natal	98.9	0.3	0.1	0.5	0.2
The Msunduzi Local Municipality	KwaZulu-Natal	81.1	2.9	9.8	6.0	0.3
Mkhambathini Local Municipality	KwaZulu-Natal	94.8	0.3	1.0	3.7	0.2
Richmond Local Municipality	KwaZulu-Natal	95.2	0.9	1.1	2.6	0.2
Emnambithi/Ladysmith Local Municipality	KwaZulu-Natal	91.8	1.0	4.4	2.7	0.2
Indaka Local Municipality	KwaZulu-Natal	99.6	0.1	0.2	0.1	0.0
Umtshezi Local Municipality	KwaZulu-Natal	90.2	1.4	5.8	2.3	0.3
Okhahlamba Local Municipality	KwaZulu-Natal	97.1	0.2	0.4	2.1	0.2
Imbabazane Local Municipality	KwaZulu-Natal	99.5	0.1	0.1	0.2	0.1
Umhlabuyalingana Local Municipality	KwaZulu-Natal	99.3	0.1	0.1	0.3	0.1
Jozini Local Municipality	KwaZulu-Natal	99.2	0.1	0.2	0.3	0.2
The Big 5 False Bay Local Municipality	KwaZulu-Natal	95.8	0.3	0.2	3.2	0.4
Hlabisa Local Municipality	KwaZulu-Natal	99.4	0.1	0.2	0.1	0.2
Mtubatuba Local Municipality	KwaZulu-Natal	98.1	0.4	0.3	1.1	0.1
uMhlathuze Local Municipality	KwaZulu-Natal	87.7	0.9	3.8	7.3	0.2
Nkandla Local Municipality	KwaZulu-Natal	99.6	0.1	0.1	0.1	0.1
Mfolozi Local Municipality	KwaZulu-Natal	98.8	0.2	0.2	0.8	0.1
Ntambanana Local Municipality	KwaZulu-Natal	99.4	0.2	0.2	0.2	0.1
uMlalazi Local Municipality	KwaZulu-Natal	97.1	0.6	0.7	1.5	0.2
Mthonjaneni Local Municipality	KwaZulu-Natal	98.5	0.4	0.2	0.7	0.2
Ingwe Local Municipality	KwaZulu-Natal	98.7	0.2	0.1	0.8	0.1
Kwa Sani Local Municipality	KwaZulu-Natal	87.9	0.9	0.4	10.5	0.4
Greater Kokstad Local Municipality	KwaZulu-Natal	87.1	8.2	1.1	3.3	0.2
Ubuhlebezwe Local Municipality	KwaZulu-Natal	97.5	1.2	0.4	0.8	0.1
Umzimkhulu Local Municipality	KwaZulu-Natal	99.3	0.3	0.1	0.1	0.1
Endumeni Local Municipality	KwaZulu-Natal	83.9	2.6	5.9	7.2	0.4
Nqutu Local Municipality	KwaZulu-Natal	99.7	0.1	0.1	0.1	0.1
Msinga Local Municipality	KwaZulu-Natal	99.6	0.1	0.1	0.2	0.1
Umvoti Local Municipality	KwaZulu-Natal	94.6	0.8	2.2	2.2	0.2
Newcastle Local Municipality	KwaZulu-Natal	91.9	0.8	3.2	3.9	0.2
Emadlangeni Local Municipality	KwaZulu-Natal	92.7	1.3	0.1	5.7	0.2
Dannhauser Local Municipality	KwaZulu-Natal	97.5	0.3	1.4	0.8	0.1
Abaqulusi Local Municipality	KwaZulu-Natal	95.4	0.5	0.4	3.5	0.1
eDumbe Local Municipality	KwaZulu-Natal	97.8	0.1	0.2	1.8	0.2
UPhongolo Local Municipality	KwaZulu-Natal	98.1	0.1	0.1	1.5	0.1
Nongoma Local Municipality	KwaZulu-Natal	99.5	0.1	0.2	0.1	0.1
Ulundi Local Municipality	KwaZulu-Natal	99.5	0.1	0.1	0.2	0.1
Maphumulo Local Municipality	KwaZulu-Natal	99.7	0.1	0.1	0.1	0.1
Mandeni Local Municipality	KwaZulu-Natal	96.7	0.5	1.7	1.0	0.1
KwaDukuza Local Municipality	KwaZulu-Natal	78.8	1.0	14.1	5.6	0.6
Ndwedwe Local Municipality	KwaZulu-Natal	98.4	0.2	0.7	0.3	0.5
eThekwini Metropolitan Municipality	KwaZulu-Natal	73.8	2.5	16.7	6.6	0.4
Greater Giyani Local Municipality	Limpopo	99.5	0.1	0.3	0.1	0.1
Greater Letaba Local Municipality	Limpopo	98.8	0.1	0.1	0.8	0.2
Greater Tzaneen Local Municipality	Limpopo	96.4	0.2	0.4	3.0	0.1
Ba-Phalaborwa Local Municipality	Limpopo	93.0	0.3	0.2	6.4	0.1
Maruleng Local Municipality	Limpopo	95.5	0.3	0.2	3.8	0.2
Mutale Local Municipality	Limpopo	99.3	0.1	0.1	0.5	0.1
Thulamela Local Municipality	Limpopo	99.3	0.1	0.5	0.1	0.1
Musina Local Municipality	Limpopo	94.0	0.3	0.5	4.8	0.3
Makhado Local Municipality	Limpopo	97.3	0.2	0.4	2.0	0.1
Blouberg Local Municipality	Limpopo	99.0	0.0	0.1	0.6	0.2
Aganang Local Municipality	Limpopo	99.6	0.1	0.1	0.1	0.2
Molemole Local Municipality	Limpopo	98.4	0.1	0.1	1.1	0.3
Polokwane Local Municipality	Limpopo	92.9	0.9	0.7	5.2	0.2
Lepele-Nkumpi Local Municipality	Limpopo	99.6	0.1	0.1	0.1	0.1
Thabazimbi Local Municipality	Limpopo	84.3	0.6	0.2	14.4	0.4
Lephalale Local Municipality	Limpopo	90.7	0.9	0.3	7.9	0.3
Mookgopong Local Municipality	Limpopo	85.6	0.4	0.2	13.2	0.6
Modimolle Local Municipality	Limpopo	88.1	0.4	0.4	10.8	0.3
Bela-Bela Local Municipality	Limpopo	84.8	1.5	0.6	12.9	0.3
Mogalakwena Local Municipality	Limpopo	96.1	0.1	0.5	3.0	0.2
Ephraim Mogale Local Municipality	Limpopo	97.8	0.1	0.2	1.6	0.3
Elias Motsoaledi Local Municipality	Limpopo	97.9	0.1	0.2	1.6	0.2
Makhuduthamaga Local Municipality	Limpopo	99.7	0.0	0.1	0.1	0.1
Fetakgomo Local Municipality	Limpopo	99.4	0.0	0.1	0.4	0.1
Greater Tubatse Local Municipality	Limpopo	98.3	0.2	0.2	1.3	0.1
Albert Luthuli Local Municipality	Mpumalanga	97.6	0.2	0.4	1.6	0.2
Msukaligwa Local Municipality	Mpumalanga	88.1	0.6	1.1	9.8	0.3
Mkhondo Local Municipality	Mpumalanga	94.7	0.5	0.8	3.7	0.2
Pixley Ka Seme Local Municipality	Mpumalanga	90.5	0.6	1.2	7.4	0.3
Lekwa Local Municipality	Mpumalanga	84.2	2.9	1.2	11.4	0.3
Dipaleseng Local Municipality	Mpumalanga	89.8	0.5	0.9	8.6	0.2
Govan Mbeki Local Municipality	Mpumalanga	80.5	1.5	1.5	16.0	0.4
Victor Khanye Local Municipality	Mpumalanga	82.3	1.1	0.3	16.0	0.3
Emalahleni Local Municipality	Mpumalanga	81.3	1.7	0.9	15.7	0.4
Steve Tshwete Local Municipality	Mpumalanga	73.6	2.6	1.6	21.8	0.4
Emakhazeni Local Municipality	Mpumalanga	87.2	1.2	0.7	10.8	0.2
Thembisile Local Municipality	Mpumalanga	99.2	0.2	0.3	0.1	0.2
Dr JS Moroka Local Municipality	Mpumalanga	99.4	0.1	0.3	0.1	0.1
Thaba Chweu Local Municipality	Mpumalanga	81.6	2.6	0.6	14.5	0.6
Mbombela Local Municipality	Mpumalanga	89.4	0.9	0.7	8.7	0.2
Umjindi Local Municipality	Mpumalanga	87.0	2.0	1.0	9.8	0.2
Nkomazi Local Municipality	Mpumalanga	97.7	0.2	0.3	1.6	0.1
Bushbuckridge Local Municipality	Mpumalanga	99.5	0.1	0.1	0.2	0.1
Moretele Local Municipality	North West	99.4	0.2	0.1	0.2	0.1
Madibeng Local Municipality	North West	89.3	0.9	0.5	8.9	0.4
Rustenburg Local Municipality	North West	88.5	0.9	0.8	9.4	0.4
Kgetlengrivier Local Municipality	North West	80.1	1.7	0.9	16.8	0.6
Moses Kotane Local Municipality	North West	98.3	0.3	0.5	0.8	0.2
Ratlou Local Municipality	North West	98.2	0.7	0.2	0.7	0.1
Tswaing Local Municipality	North West	92.4	1.4	0.3	5.6	0.2
Mafikeng Local Municipality	North West	95.5	2.3	0.8	1.3	0.2
Ditsobotla Local Municipality	North West	89.1	1.9	0.6	8.2	0.3
Ramotshere Moiloa Local Municipality	North West	94.4	0.9	0.7	3.8	0.3
Naledi Local Municipality	North West	74.0	14.7	1.1	9.5	0.6
Mamusa Local Municipality	North West	91.5	2.2	0.5	5.5	0.3
Greater Taung Local Municipality	North West	98.2	1.0	0.2	0.4	0.1
Lekwa-Teemane Local Municipality	North West	81.2	7.4	0.6	10.4	0.4
Kagisano/Molopo Local Municipality	North West	96.0	1.4	0.2	2.1	0.3
Ventersdorp Local Municipality	North West	90.1	2.7	0.3	5.9	1.0
Tlokwe Local Municipality	North West	71.3	6.8	0.9	20.6	0.4
City of Matlosana Local Municipality	North West	81.0	3.5	0.8	14.5	0.3
Maquassi Hills Local Municipality	North West	88.7	2.3	0.4	8.2	0.3
Richtersveld Local Municipality	Northern Cape	13.1	76.6	0.5	8.5	1.4
Nama Khoi Local Municipality	Northern Cape	4.2	88.1	0.5	6.6	0.8
Kamiesberg Local Municipality	Northern Cape	5.3	85.6	0.5	8.1	0.5
Hantam Local Municipality	Northern Cape	4.4	82.2	0.7	12.1	0.6
Karoo Hoogland Local Municipality	Northern Cape	5.5	78.9	0.7	14.6	0.4
Khâi-Ma Local Municipality	Northern Cape	17.6	75.1	0.4	6.0	0.8
Ubuntu Local Municipality	Northern Cape	21.3	69.8	0.5	7.6	0.8
Umsobomvu Local Municipality	Northern Cape	62.6	30.6	0.5	5.7	0.7
Emthanjeni Local Municipality	Northern Cape	33.2	57.7	0.6	8.0	0.6
Kareeberg Local Municipality	Northern Cape	4.8	85.1	0.5	9.1	0.5
Renosterberg Local Municipality	Northern Cape	32.9	57.4	0.5	8.6	0.6
Thembelihle Local Municipality	Northern Cape	15.2	70.7	0.5	13.1	0.4
Siyathemba Local Municipality	Northern Cape	18.8	71.9	0.5	8.5	0.4
Siyancuma Local Municipality	Northern Cape	33.0	57.5	0.7	7.5	1.4
Mier Local Municipality	Northern Cape	4.0	90.4	0.6	4.4	0.6
Kai ǃGarib Local Municipality	Northern Cape	28.3	62.2	0.8	6.3	2.3
ǁKhara Hais Local Municipality	Northern Cape	23.1	65.2	0.7	9.9	1.2
ǃKheis Local Municipality	Northern Cape	6.9	85.4	1.0	5.4	1.4
Tsantsabane Local Municipality	Northern Cape	52.8	37.6	0.6	8.4	0.6
Kgatelopele Local Municipality	Northern Cape	49.9	38.9	0.7	9.8	0.8
Sol Plaatjie Local Municipality	Northern Cape	61.2	27.4	1.2	7.5	2.7
Dikgatlong Local Municipality	Northern Cape	58.5	28.5	0.6	3.6	8.9
Magareng Local Municipality	Northern Cape	80.0	13.9	0.7	5.1	0.3
Phokwane Local Municipality	Northern Cape	81.9	11.0	0.4	6.3	0.5
Joe Morolong Local Municipality	Northern Cape	96.4	2.0	0.3	1.2	0.2
Ga-Segonyana Local Municipality	Northern Cape	87.0	7.6	0.4	4.6	0.4
Gamagara Local Municipality	Northern Cape	55.0	28.7	0.6	14.0	1.7
Matzikama Local Municipality	Western Cape	8.5	74.7	0.6	14.8	1.3
Cederberg Local Municipality	Western Cape	12.7	75.7	0.3	11.0	0.4
Bergrivier Local Municipality	Western Cape	11.3	70.9	0.4	16.9	0.4
Saldanha Bay Local Municipality	Western Cape	24.5	55.8	0.8	18.0	0.9
Swartland Local Municipality	Western Cape	18.3	64.8	0.5	15.6	0.7
Witzenberg Local Municipality	Western Cape	25.3	65.9	0.2	7.7	0.8
Drakenstein Local Municipality	Western Cape	22.7	62.5	0.4	13.5	0.9
Stellenbosch Local Municipality	Western Cape	28.1	52.2	0.4	18.5	0.8
Breede Valley Local Municipality	Western Cape	24.3	63.3	0.6	10.7	1.1
Langeberg Local Municipality	Western Cape	16.3	70.3	0.3	12.3	0.9
Swellendam Local Municipality	Western Cape	12.4	68.8	0.3	17.4	1.1
Theewaterskloof Local Municipality	Western Cape	26.4	62.9	0.4	9.4	0.9
Overstrand Local Municipality	Western Cape	36.2	31.0	0.3	31.2	1.2
Cape Agulhas Local Municipality	Western Cape	11.5	65.6	0.3	21.6	0.9
Kannaland Local Municipality	Western Cape	4.7	84.6	0.3	9.9	0.5
Hessequa Local Municipality	Western Cape	7.4	68.5	0.4	23.2	0.4
Mossel Bay Local Municipality	Western Cape	29.5	43.5	0.5	25.5	1.1
George Local Municipality	Western Cape	28.2	50.4	0.5	19.7	1.2
Oudtshoorn Local Municipality	Western Cape	9.1	77.3	0.3	12.5	0.7
Bitou Local Municipality	Western Cape	45.2	31.2	0.5	16.9	6.1
Knysna Local Municipality	Western Cape	36.1	40.9	0.4	21.0	1.6
Laingsburg Local Municipality	Western Cape	7.0	79.0	0.2	13.3	0.5
Prince Albert Local Municipality	Western Cape	2.8	84.5	0.3	11.8	0.6
Beaufort West Local Municipality	Western Cape	16.3	73.5	0.5	9.2	0.5
City of Cape Town Metropolitan Municipality	Western Cape	38.6	42.4	1.4	15.7	1.9

== See also ==
- Demographics of South Africa
