= List of municipalities in the Eastern Cape =

The Eastern Cape province of South Africa is divided, for local government purposes, into two metropolitan municipalities (Buffalo City and Nelson Mandela Bay) and six district municipalities. The district municipalities are in turn divided into thirty-one local municipalities.

In the following map, the district and metropolitan municipalities are labelled in capital letters and shaded in various different colours.

== District and metropolitan municipalities ==
Name	Code	Seat	Area (km²)	Population (2016)	Pop. density (per km²)
Alfred Nzo District Municipality	DC44	eMaxesibeni	10,731	867,864	80.9
Amathole District Municipality	DC12	KuGompo City	21,117	880,790	41.7
Buffalo City Metropolitan Municipality	BUF	KuGompo City	2,750	834,997	303.6
Chris Hani District Municipality	DC13	Komani	36,407	840,055	23.1
Joe Gqabi District Municipality	DC14	Ekhephini	25,617	372,912	14.6
Nelson Mandela Bay Metropolitan Municipality	NMA	Gqeberha	1,957	1,263,051	645.4
OR Tambo District Municipality	DC15	Mthatha	12,141	1,457,384	120.0
Sarah Baartman District Municipality	DC10	Gqeberha	58,245	479,923	8.2

== Local and metropolitan municipalities ==
Name	Code	District	Seat	Area (km²)	Population (2016)	Pop. density (per km²)
Amahlathi Local Municipality	EC124	Amathole	Stutterheim	4,505	101,826	22.6
Blue Crane Route Local Municipality	EC102	Sarah Baartman	KwaNojoli	11,068	36,063	3.3
Buffalo City Metropolitan Municipality	BUF		KuGompo City	2,750	834,997	303.6
Dr AB Xuma Local Municipality	EC137	Chris Hani	Ngcobo	2,484	162,014	65.2
Dr Beyers Naudé Local Municipality	EC101	Sarah Baartman	Robert Sobukwe Town	28,653	82,197	2.9
Elundini Local Municipality	EC141	Joe Gqabi	Nqanqarhu	5,019	144,929	28.9
Emalahleni Local Municipality	EC136	Chris Hani	Cacadu	3,484	124,532	35.7
Enoch Mgijima Local Municipality	EC139	Chris Hani	Komani	13,584	267,011	19.7
Great Kei Local Municipality	EC123	Amathole	Qumrha	1,700	31,692	18.6
Ingquza Hill Local Municipality	EC153	OR Tambo	Flagstaff	2,477	303,379	122.5
Intsika Yethu Local Municipality	EC135	Chris Hani	Cofimvaba	2,873	152,159	53.0
Inxuba Yethemba Local Municipality	EC131	Chris Hani	Nxuba	11,663	70,493	6.0
King Sabata Dalindyebo Local Municipality	EC157	OR Tambo	Mthatha	3,019	488,349	161.8
Kou-Kamma Local Municipality	EC109	Sarah Baartman	Kareedouw	3,642	43,688	12.0
Kouga Local Municipality	EC108	Sarah Baartman	Jeffreys Bay	2,670	112,941	42.3
Kumkani Mhlontlo Local Municipality	EC156	OR Tambo	Qumbu	2,880	189,176	65.7
Makana Local Municipality	EC104	Sarah Baartman	Makhanda	4,376	82,060	18.8
Matatiele Local Municipality	EC441	Alfred Nzo	Matatiele	4,352	219,447	50.4
Mbhashe Local Municipality	EC121	Amathole	Dutywa	3,303	277,250	84.0
Mnquma Local Municipality	EC122	Amathole	Gcuwa	3,137	246,813	78.7
Ndlambe Local Municipality	EC105	Sarah Baartman	Port Alfred	1,841	63,180	34.3
Nelson Mandela Bay Metropolitan Municipality	NMA		Gqeberha	1,957	1,263,051	645.4
Ngqushwa Local Municipality	EC126	Amathole	Peddie	2,115	63,694	30.1
Ntabankulu Local Municipality	EC444	Alfred Nzo	Ntabankulu	1,385	128,848	93.1
Nyandeni Local Municipality	EC155	OR Tambo	Libode	2,474	309,702	125.2
Port St Johns Local Municipality	EC154	OR Tambo	Port St Johns	1,291	166,779	129.2
Raymond Mhlaba Local Municipality	EC129	Amathole	KwaMaqoma	6,357	159,515	25.1
Sakhisizwe Local Municipality	EC138	Chris Hani	Cala	2,318	63,846	27.5
Senqu Local Municipality	EC142	Joe Gqabi	Lady Grey	7,329	140,720	19.2
Sundays River Valley Local Municipality	EC106	Sarah Baartman	Nqweba	5,995	59,793	10.0
Umzimvubu Local Municipality	EC442	Alfred Nzo	KwaBhaca	2,579	199,620	77.4
Walter Sisulu Local Municipality	EC145	Joe Gqabi	Burgersdorp	13,269	87,263	6.6
Winnie Madikizela-Mandela Local Municipality	EC443	Alfred Nzo	Mbizana	2,415	319,948	132.5

== Former municipalities ==
These municipalities have been dissolved since the current system of local government was established in 2000.

Name	Code	Dissolved	Fate
Camdeboo Local Municipality	EC101	3 August 2016	Merged to create Dr Beyers Naudé Local Municipality
Ikwezi Local Municipality	EC103	3 August 2016	Merged to create Dr Beyers Naudé Local Municipality
Baviaans Local Municipality	EC107	3 August 2016	Merged to create Dr Beyers Naudé Local Municipality
Nkonkobe Local Municipality	EC127	3 August 2016	Merged to create Raymond Mhlaba Local Municipality
Nxuba Local Municipality	EC128	3 August 2016	Merged to create Raymond Mhlaba Local Municipality
Tsolwana Local Municipality	EC132	3 August 2016	Merged to create Enoch Mgijima Local Municipality
Inkwanca Local Municipality	EC133	3 August 2016	Merged to create Enoch Mgijima Local Municipality
Lukhanji Local Municipality	EC134	3 August 2016	Merged to create Enoch Mgijima Local Municipality
Maletswai Local Municipality	EC143	3 August 2016	Merged to create Walter Sisulu Local Municipality
Gariep Local Municipality	EC144	3 August 2016	Merged to create Walter Sisulu Local Municipality
