= Afrikaans-speaking population of South Africa =

Geographical distribution of Afrikaans in South Africa: proportion of the population that speaks Afrikaans at home. 0–20% 20–40% 40–60% 60–80% 80–100%

Geographical distribution of Afrikaans in South Africa: density of Afrikaans home-language speakers. <1 /km² 1–3 /km² 3–10 /km² 10–30 /km² 30–100 /km² 100–300 /km² 300–1,000 /km² 1,000–3,000 /km² >3,000 /km²

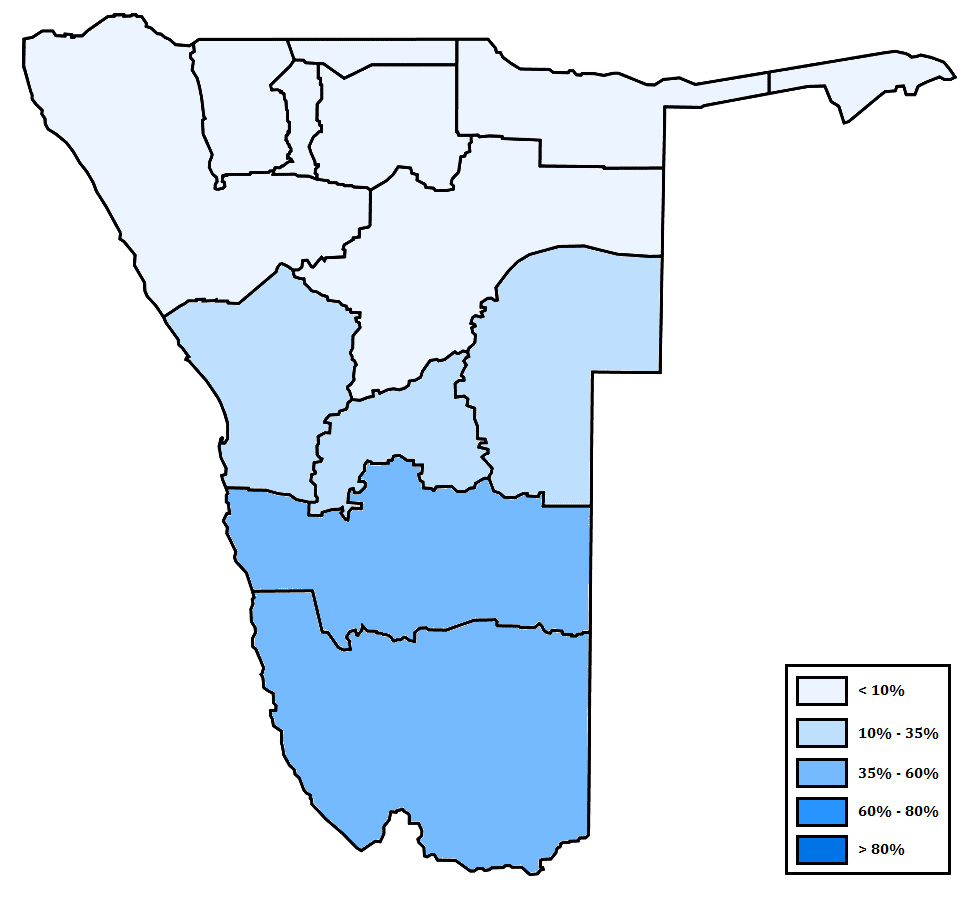
Geographical distribution of Afrikaans in Namibia

South African census figures suggest a growing number of first language Afrikaans speakers in all nine provinces, a total of 6.85 million in 2011 compared to 5.98 million a decade earlier. 2001 Namibian census reported that 11.4% of Namibians had Afrikaans (Namibian Afrikaans) as their home language.

The South African Institute of Race Relations (SAIRR) projects that a growing majority will be Coloured Afrikaans speakers. Afrikaans speakers enjoy higher employment rates than other South African language groups, despite half a million who are unemployed.

== 2001 census ==
The number of Afrikaans speakers according to the census of 2001 in South Africa by district municipal boundaries were as follows:

South Africa	Total population	Afrikaans	% Afrikaans
NC081: Mier	6,836	6,772	99.06%
NC065: Hantam	19,812	19,596	98.91%
NC066: Karoo Hoogland	10,514	10,372	98.65%
NC074: Kareeberg	9,488	9,358	98.63%
NC064: Kamiesberg	10,744	10,587	98.54%
WC052: Prince Albert	10,517	10,347	98.38%
WC051: Laingsburg	6,681	6,562	98.22%
WCDMA01: West Coast	4,258	4,179	98.14%
WC041: Kannaland	23,970	23,499	98.04%
WCDMA04: South Cape	14597	14284	97.86%
NC084: Kheis	16,038	15,629	97.45%
NCDMA06: Namaqualand	814	789	96.93%
NCDMA07: Bo Karoo	3,165	3,067	96.90%
NC062: Nama Khoi	44,761	43,183	96.47%
WC042: Langeberg	44,104	42,220	95.73%
WC011: Matzikama	50,205	47,752	95.11%
NC076: Thembelihle	13,998	13,227	94.49%
WC013: Bergrivier	46,327	43,684	94.29%
NC077: Siyathemba	17,517	16,462	93.98%
WC012: Cederberg	39,328	36,405	92.57%
WC045: Oudtshoorn	84,685	77,953	92.05%
WC033: Cape Agulhas	26,176	24,043	91.85%
WCDMA05: Central Karoo	6,181	5,628	91.05%
EC107: Baviaans	15,337	13,927	90.81%
NC083: Khara Hais	73,774	66,532	90.18%
WC034: Swellendam	28,072	25,304	90.14%
ECDMA10: Aberdeen Plain	6,550	5,880	89.77%
NCDMA08: Benede Oranje	9,087	8,146	89.64%
WC015: Swartland	72,113	63,561	88.14%
NC067: Khai-Ma	11,349	9,948	87.66%
NC061: Richtersveld	10,126	8,829	87.19%
NC071: Ubuntu	16,377	14,035	85.70%
WC026: Breede River/Winelands	81,263	69,274	85.25%
WC053: Beaufort West	37,086	31,470	84.86%
WC022: Witzenberg	83,558	67,709	81.03%
NC078: Siyancuma	35,807	29,013	81.03%
WCDMA02: Breede River	6,492	5,241	80.73%
WC025: Breede Valley	146,026	117,581	80.52%
EC109: Kou-Kamma	34,296	27,573	80.40%
WC014: Saldanha Bay	70,435	56,401	80.08%
NC082: Kai !Garib	57,675	45,655	79.16%
EC101: Camdeboo	44,367	34,583	77.95%
WCDMA03: Overberg	256	199	77.73%
WC023: Drakenstein	194,421	149,066	76.67%
WC031: Theewaterskloof	93,268	71,507	76.67%
NC075: Renosterberg	9,072	6,782	74.76%
WC024: Stellenbosch	117,704	87,259	74.13%
WC043: Mossel Bay	71,494	52,335	73.20%
NC073: Emthanjeni	35,539	26,007	73.18%
EC103: Ikwezi	10,363	7,149	68.99%
WC044: George	135,415	90,866	67.10%
FS161: Letsemeng	42,988	28,256	65.73%
EC108: Kouga	70,689	45,887	64.91%
NCDMA09: Diamondfields	4,512	2,844	63.03%
WC032: Overstrand	55,725	34,616	62.12%
NC085: Tsantsabane	31,015	19,229	62.00%
NC086: Kgatelopele	15,442	9,408	60.92%
WC048: Knysna	51,472	28,448	55.27%
NC01B1: Gamagara	16,169	8,704	53.83%
NC091: Sol Plaatje	201,462	100,180	49.73%
WC047: Plettenberg Bay	29,184	14,369	49.24%
EC131: Inxuba Yethemba	60,294	27,409	45.46%
ECDMA14: Oviston	9	4	44.44%
NC092: Dikgatlong	35,773	15,197	42.48%
NC072: Umsombomvu	23,645	9,837	41.60%
City of Cape Town	2,893,251	1,198,990	41.44%
EC102: Blue Crane Route	35,008	14,168	40.47%
FS162: Kopanong	55,951	18,138	32.42%
NCDMACB1: Kalahari	6,232	1,967	31.56%
Port Elizabeth: Nelson Mandela Bay Metro	1,005,776	298,790	29.71%
GT422: Midvaal	64,641	18,970	29.35%
NW402: Potchefstroom	128,357	36,580	28.50%
GT412: Randfontein	128,834	36,497	28.33%
NWDMA37: Pilanesberg National Park	300	83	27.67%
NC093: Magareng	21,744	6,009	27.64%
GT02b1: Nokeng TSA Taemane	52,587	14,411	27.40%
EC144: Gariep	31,302	8,391	26.81%
NW392: Naledi	58,100	13,841	23.82%
EC106: Sundays River Valley	41,590	9,427	22.67%
CBLC7: Phokwane	61,323	13,706	22.35%
EC128: Nxuba	24,819	5,439	21.91%
Pretoria: City of Tshwane Metro	1,985,984	422,866	21.29%
FS182: Tokologo	32,464	6,235	19.21%
Klerksdorp	359,206	66,311	18.46%
NW396: Lekwa-Teemane	42,973	7,888	18.36%
FS204: Metsimaholo	115,963	20,083	17.32%
NP364: Mookgopong	30,770	5,248	17.06%
GT423: Lesedi	71,542	12,139	16.97%
NW374: Kgetlengrivier	36,476	6,179	16.94%
MP313: Middelburg	142,778	24,163	16.92%
NP361: Thabazimbi	63,918	10,784	16.87%
EC143: Maletswai	37,300	6,171	16.54%
GT411: Mogale City	289,720	47,826	16.51%
FS172: Mangaung	645,438	104,164	16.14%
CBLC2: Kungwini	107,314	16,346	15.23%
CBLC8: Merafong City	210,478	31,050	14.75%
MP312: Emalahleni	276,406	40,302	14.58%
EC104: Makana	74,529	10,285	13.80%
MP307: Highveld East	221,750	30,338	13.68%
FS203: Ngwathe	118,793	16,069	13.53%
NP365: Modimolle	72,799	9,813	13.48%
GT421: Emfuleni	658,425	88,000	13.37%
CBLC1: Ga-Segonyana	70,389	9,314	13.23%
FS201: Moqhaka	167,895	22,181	13.21%
NW401: Ventersdorp	43,082	5,626	13.06%
East Rand: Ekurhuleni Metro	2,480,282	321,103	12.95%
MP321: Thaba Chweu	81,236	9,960	12.26%
ECDMA13: Mountain Zebra National Park	75	9	12.00%
MP305: Lekwa Local Municipality	103,262	12,327	11.94%
KZ5a3: Matatiele Local Municipality	16,219	1,924	11.86%
NP366: Bela-Bela	52,127	6,142	11.78%
GTDMA41: West Rand	5,768	667	11.56%
FS184: Matjhabeng Local Municipality	408,170	47,052	11.53%
NW404: Maquassi Hills Local Municipality	69,034	7,678	11.12%
EC105: Ndlambe Local Municipality	55,476	6,038	10.88%
NW373: Rustenburg	395,539	42,720	10.80%
MP311: Delmas	56,203	6,016	10.70%
FS163: Mohokare Local Municipality	36,319	3,768	10.37%
FS192: Dihlabeng Local Municipality	128,915	13,339	10.35%
NW384: Ditsobotla Local Municipality	147,602	1,4643	9.92%
NW395: Molopo	11,690	1,128	9.65%
GT414: Westonaria	109,316	10,298	9.42%
MP302: Msukaligwa Local Municipality	124,813	11,721	9.39%
MP314: Emakhazeni	43,014	39,82	9.26%
FS173: Mantsopa Local Municipality	55,345	5,098	9.21%
NP362: Lephalale	96,106	8,749	9.10%
EC133: Inkwanca Local Municipality	20,242	1,760	8.69%
KZ5a4: Greater Kokstad Local Municipality	56,534	4,850	8.58%
FS171: Naledi Local Municipality	27,487	2,327	8.47%
NW372: Madibeng Local Municipality	338,266	27,711	8.19%
City of Johannesburg Metropolitan Municipality	3,225,810	260,829	8.09%
MP306: Dipaleseng Local Municipality	38,618	3,101	8.03%
FS181: Masilonyana Local Municipality	64,407	5,144	7.99%
KZ253: Utrecht	32,271	2,567	7.95%
MP323: Umjindi Local Municipality	53,745	4,173	7.76%
EC132: Tsolwana Local Municipality	32,519	2,459	7.56%
FS205: Mafube Local Municipality	57,639	4,097	7.11%
NW393: Mamusa Local Municipality	48,364	3,436	7.10%
FS195: Phumelela Local Municipality	50,902	3,444	6.77%
NP334: Phalaborwa	131,087	8,857	6.76%
CBDMA4: Kruger Park	3,667	243	6.63%
KZ241: Endumeni Local Municipality	51,102	3,339	6.53%
MP304: Pixley Ka Seme	80,734	5,249	6.50%
EC125: Buffalo City	701,884	45,535	6.49%
NW382: Tswaing	114,143	7,344	6.43%
Golden Gate Highlands National Park	178	11	6.18%
NP354: Polokwane	508,271	30,652	6.03%
FS193: Nketoana Local Municipality	61,939	3,734	6.03%
FS191: Setsoto Local Municipality	123,184	6,741	5.47%
KZ282: Mhlathuze Local Municipality	289,186	15,599	5.39%
FS185: Nala Local Municipality	98,262	5,274	5.37%
NP341: Musina	39,313	2,094	5.33%
FS183: Tswelopele	53,714	2,713	5.05%
EC134: Lukanji	184,541	9,279	5.03%
NW385: Zeerust	137,439	6,325	4.60%
MP322: Mbombela	474,803	21,390	4.51%
Giants Castle GR	518	23	4.44%
KZ252: Newcastle	332,980	14,427	4.33%
EC127: Nkonkobe	128,662	5,301	4.12%
NP367: Mogalakwena	298,453	11,643	3.90%
KZ263: Abaqulusi	191,001	7,276	3.81%
Mkhomazi Wilderness Area	818	31	3.79%
KZ216: Hibiscus Coast	21,8175	7,743	3.55%
MP303: Mkhondo	142,882	4,598	3.22%
NW383: Mafikeng	259,478	7597	2.93%
KZ232: Emnambithi/Ladysmith	225,449	6,356	2.82%
NP04A1: Maruleng	94,385	2,581	2.73%
KZ275: Mtubatuba	35,209	880	2.50%
NW391: Kagisano	96,387	2,300	2.39%
NP344: Makhado	497,083	10,685	2.15%
EC142: Senqu	135,130	2,889	2.14%
KZ212: Umdoni	62,293	1,328	2.13%
EC123: Great Kei	44,459	921	2.07%
CBLC3: Greater Marble Hall	121,317	2,461	2.03%
KZ262: uPhongolo	119,773	2,364	1.97%
EC138: Sakhisizwe	54,031	971	1.80%
KZ225: Msunduzi	553,223	9,905	1.79%
NP333: Greater Tzaneen	375,581	6,720	1.79%
KZ234: Umtshezi	59,925	956	1.60%
NP353: Molemole	109,437	1,724	1.58%
MP301: Albert Luthuli	187,929	2,902	1.54%
KZ222: uMngeni	73,898	1,125	1.52%
EC124: Amahlathi	139,037	2,035	1.46%
FS194: Maluti a Phofung	360,775	5,209	1.44%
Durban: Ethekwini	3,090,117	44,438	1.44%
NW394: Greater Taung	182,167	2,308	1.27%
MP324: Nkomazi	334,418	4,204	1.26%
KZ245: Umvoti	92,296	1,098	1.19%
KZ292: KwaDukuza	158,586	1,812	1.14%
KZ273: The Big 5False Bay	31,104	353	1.13%
EC141: Elundini	137,574	1,449	1.05%
KZ261: eDumbe	82,233	865	1.05%
CBLC4: Greater Groblersdal	220,733	2250	1.02%
KZ291: eNdondakusuka	128,672	1,293	1.00%
NP332: Greater Letaba	220,121	2,091	0.95%
EC136: Emalahleni	155,938	1,078	0.93%
KZ235: Okhahlamba	137,524	1,254	0.91%
KZ223: Mooi Mpofana	16,826	327	0.89%
CBLC5: Greater Tubatse	270,125	2,396	0.89%
KZ285: Mthonjaneni	50,387	429	0.85%
KZ254: Dannhuser	102,774	854	0.83%
MPDMA32: Lowveld	503	4	0.80%
NW381: Setla-Kgobi	104,326	791	0.76%
NP03A3: Fetakgomo	92,083	669	0.73%
NW375: Moses Kotane	236,842	1,476	0.62%
KZ226: Mkhambathini	59,063	360	0.61%
KZ281: Mbonambi	106,930	644	0.60%
KZDMA27: St Lucia Park	5,083	29	0.57%
NP342: Mutal	78,921	422	0.53%
NW1a1: Moshaweng	84,113	416	0.49%
KZ284: uMlalazi	221,070	1,031	0.47%
KZ227: Richmond	63,222	276	0.44%
NP351: Blouberg	161,316	662	0.41%
KZ221: uMshwathi	108,024	370	0.34%
KZ214: uMuziwabantu	92,331	262	0.28%
EC126: Ngqushwa	84,229	237	0.28%
KZ272: Jozini	184,092	484	0.26%
EC157: King Sabata Dalindyebo	415,237	1,063	0.26%
KZ266: Ulundi	212,965	521	0.24%
KZ283: Ntambanana	84,767	189	0.22%
KZ5a2: Kwa Sani	15,296	34	0.22%
KZ5a5: Ubuhlebezwe	101,943	222	0.22%
KZ271: Umhlabuyalingana	140,964	301	0.21%
KZ211: Vulamehlo	83,041	175	0.21%
MP315: Thembisile	258,862	537	0.21%
NW371: Moretele	177,907	361	0.20%
EC154: Port St Johns	146,132	292	0.20%
NP331: Greater Giyani	237,425	463	0.20%
NP355: Lepele-Nkumpi	227,961	440	0.19%
EC156: Mhlontlo	196,677	376	0.19%
KZ294: Maphumulo	120,643	220	0.18%
EC05b1: Umzimkhulu	174,338	313	0.18%
KZ265: Nongoma	198,441	356	0.18%
KZ213: Umzumbe	193,762	345	0.18%
KZ293: Ndwedwe	152,479	253	0.17%
EC05b2: Umzimvubu	376,053	609	0.16%
KZ242: Nqutu	145,030	234	0.16%
KZ215: Ezingoleni	54,433	84	0.15%
EC122: Mnquma	287,765	440	0.15%
EC155: Nyandeni	281,244	427	0.15%
EC137: Engcobo	148,396	220	0.15%
EC121: Mbhashe	253,381	373	0.15%
KZ274: Hlabisa	176,879	257	0.15%
KZ286: Nkandla	133,598	194	0.15%
CBLC6: Bushbuckridge	499,701	695	0.14%
KZ224: Impendle	33,569	46	0.14%
EC135: Intsika Yethu	194,219	257	0.13%
MP316: Dr JS Moroka	243,304	294	0.12%
KZ5a1: Ingwe	107,560	127	0.12%
EC152: Ntabankulu	136,399	157	0.1%
EC151: Mbizana	245,415	274	0.11%
KZ236: Imbabazane	119,920	126	0.11%
KZ233: Indaka	113,655	119	0.10%
KZ244: Msinga	168,031	172	0.10%
NP352: Aganang	147,676	148	0.10%
EC153: Qaukeni	255,370	225	0.09%
NP343: Thulamela	584,560	496	0.08%
NP03A2: Makhuduthamaga	262,885	180	0.05%
Highmoor/Kamberg Park	9	0	0.00%
