= Dr Beyers Naudé Local Municipality elections =

Local elections in the Eastern Cape, South Africa

The council of the Dr Beyers Naudé Local Municipality is elected every five years by a system of mixed-member proportional representation. Twelve of the twenty-four councillors are elected by first-past-the-post voting from individual wards, while the other twelve are appointed from party lists so that the total number of party representatives is proportional to the number of votes received. By-elections are held to replace the councillors elected by wards if a vacancy occurs.

The Dr Beyers Naudé Local Municipality was created in 2016 by the merger of the Camdeboo, Ikwezi and Baviaans local municipalities. For elections in the predecessor municipalities, see:

- Camdeboo Local Municipality elections
- Ikwezi Local Municipality elections
- Baviaans Local Municipality elections

In the election of 4 November 2026 no party won a majority. The Democratic Alliance (DA) won the largest number of seats on the council.

== Results ==
The following table shows the composition of the council after past elections.

Event	ANC	DA	FF+	Other	Total
2016 election	14	13	—	0	27
2021 election	11	10	1	2	24
2026 election	9	10	1	4	24

== August 2016 election ==
At its inaugural election the council consisted of 27 members. The African National Congress obtained a majority of 14 councillors.

Party	Ward			List			Total seats
Party	Votes	%	Seats	Votes	%	Seats	Total seats
African National Congress	12,561	51.08	8	12,607	51.02	6	14
Democratic Alliance	11,504	46.78	6	11,466	46.40	7	13
Economic Freedom Fighters	399	1.62	0	459	1.86	0	0
Service Delivery Organisation	115	0.47	0	177	0.72	0	0
Independent candidates	14	0.06	0				0
Total	24,593	100.00	14	24,709	100.00	13	27
Valid votes	24,593	98.42		24,709	98.57		
Invalid/blank votes	396	1.58		359	1.43		
Total votes	24,989	100.00		25,068	100.00		
Registered voters/turnout	40,887	61.12		40,887	61.31		
Source: Electoral Commission

=== By-elections from August 2016 to November 2021 ===
The following by-election was held to fill a vacant ward seat in the period between the elections in August 2016 and November 2021.

Date	Ward	Party of the previous councillor	Party of the newly elected councillor
10 April 2019	2	Democratic Alliance	Democratic Alliance

== November 2021 election ==
In 2021 the size of the council was reduced to 24 members. No party achieved a majority. On 23 November 2021, a coalition was formed between the Democratic Alliance (DA), the Compatriots of South Africa and the Freedom Front Plus, with the DA's Ewald Loock elected as mayor.

Party	Ward			List			Total seats
Party	Votes	%	Seats	Votes	%	Seats	Total seats
African National Congress	8,666	47.01	7	8,595	46.63	4	11
Democratic Alliance	7,253	39.34	5	7,330	39.77	5	10
Economic Freedom Fighters	782	4.24	0	760	4.12	1	1
Compatriots of South Africa	656	3.56	0	675	3.66	1	1
Freedom Front Plus	567	3.08	0	546	2.96	1	1
Service Delivery Movement	192	1.04	0	220	1.19	0	0
Patriotic Alliance	128	0.69	0	280	1.52	0	0
Independent candidates	180	0.98	0				0
African Transformation Movement	11	0.06	0	27	0.15	0	0
Total	18,435	100.00	12	18,433	100.00	12	24
Valid votes	18,435	98.07		18,433	98.55		
Invalid/blank votes	363	1.93		272	1.45		
Total votes	18,798	100.00		18,705	100.00		
Registered voters/turnout	39,913	47.10		39,913	46.86		
Source: Electoral Commission

=== By-elections from November 2021 ===
The following by-elections were held to fill vacant ward seats in the period from the election in November 2021.

Date	Ward	Party of the previous councillor	Party of the newly elected councillor
18 Mar 2026	7	African National Congress	Patriotic Alliance

== November 2026 election ==
The following table shows the results of the 2026 election.

Party	Ward			List			Total seats
Party	Votes	%	Seats	Votes	%	Seats	Total seats
Democratic Alliance	8,904	40.06	6	8,883	40.17	4	10
African National Congress	8,007	36.03	4	8,131	36.77	5	9
Patriotic Alliance	3,341	15.03	2	3,415	15.44	2	4
Freedom Front Plus	616	2.77	0	699	3.16	1	1
Economic Freedom Fighters	444	2.00	0	451	2.04	0	0
Action Save-BNM	316	1.42	0	252	1.14	0	0
Independent candidates	330	1.48	0				0
uMkhonto weSizwe Party	136	0.61	0	118	0.53	0	0
United Democratic Movement	66	0.30	0	66	0.30	0	0
African Transformation Movement	21	0.09	0	47	0.21	0	0
South African Communist Party	33	0.15	0	21	0.09	0	0
Afrika Mayibuye Movement	10	0.04	0	29	0.13	0	0
Total	22,224	100.00	12	22,112	100.00	12	24
Valid votes	22,224	98.53		22,112	98.41		
Invalid/blank votes	332	1.47		357	1.59		
Total votes	22,556	100.00		22,469	100.00		
Registered voters/turnout	43,196	52.22		43,196	52.02		
