= Camdeboo Local Municipality elections =

The council of the Camdeboo Local Municipality was elected in 2000, 2006 and 2011 by a system of mixed-member proportional representation. Half of the councillors were elected by first-past-the-post voting from individual wards, while the other half were appointed from party lists so that the total number of party representatives was proportional to the number of votes received.

In 2016 the Camdeboo Local Municipality was merged with two others to create the Dr Beyers Naudé Local Municipality; for election results in the merged municipality see Dr Beyers Naudé Local Municipality elections.

== Results ==
The following table shows the composition of the council after past elections.

Event	ANC	DA	Other	Total
2000 election	6	4	1	11
2002 floor-crossing	6	3	2	11
2004 floor-crossing	8	3	0	11
2006 election	8	3	0	11
2011 election	8	6	0	14

== 2000 elections ==
The Camdeboo Local Municipality was created in 2000, replacing the transitional local councils of Graaff-Reinet, Aberdeen and Nieu-Bethesda. The council consisted of 11 members; the ANC obtained a majority of 6.

Party	Ward			List			Total seats
Party	Votes	%	Seats	Votes	%	Seats	Total seats
African National Congress	5,534	55.84	4	5,568	56.27	2	6
Democratic Alliance	3,622	36.55	2	3,527	35.64	2	4
United Democratic Movement	643	6.49	0	800	8.08	1	1
Independent candidates	112	1.13	0				0
Total	9,911	100.00	6	9,895	100.00	5	11
Valid votes	9,911	97.46		9,895	97.28		
Invalid/blank votes	258	2.54		277	2.72		
Total votes	10,169	100.00		10,172	100.00		
Registered voters/turnout	17,641	57.64		17,641	57.66		

=== By-elections from December 2000 to October 2002 ===
The following by-elections were held to fill vacant ward seats in the period between the election in December 2000 and the floor crossing period in October 2002.

Date	Ward	Party of the previous councillor	Party of the newly elected councillor
19 June 2002	5	African National Congress	African National Congress

=== October 2002 floor crossing ===
In terms of the Eighth Amendment of the Constitution and the judgment of the Constitutional Court in United Democratic Movement v President of the Republic of South Africa and Others, in the period from 8–22 October 2002 councillors had the opportunity to cross the floor to a different political party without losing their seats. In the Camdeboo council, one councillor crossed from the Democratic Alliance (DA) to the New National Party (NNP), which had formerly been part of the DA.

Party	Seats before	Net change	Seats after
African National Congress	6	0	6
Democratic Alliance	4	▼1	3
United Democratic Movement	1	0	1
New National Party	–	▲1	1

=== September 2004 floor crossing ===
Another floor-crossing period occurred on 1–15 September 2004, in which the councillors from the NNP and the United Democratic Movement crossed to the ANC.

Party	Seats before	Net change	Seats after
African National Congress	6	▲2	8
Democratic Alliance	3	0	3
United Democratic Movement	1	▼1	0
New National Party	1	▼1	0

== 2006 elections ==
Party	Ward			List			Total seats
Party	Votes	%	Seats	Votes	%	Seats	Total seats
African National Congress	6,859	67.40	5	6,840	67.14	3	8
Democratic Alliance	2,461	24.18	1	2,608	25.60	2	3
Freedom Front Plus	402	3.95	0	431	4.23	0	0
Independent Democrats	121	1.19	0	309	3.03	0	0
Independent candidates	333	3.27	0				0
Total	10,176	100.00	6	10,188	100.00	5	11
Valid votes	10,176	97.56		10,188	97.66		
Invalid/blank votes	255	2.44		244	2.34		
Total votes	10,431	100.00		10,432	100.00		
Registered voters/turnout	21,100	49.44		21,100	49.44		

== 2011 elections ==
Party	Ward			List			Total seats
Party	Votes	%	Seats	Votes	%	Seats	Total seats
African National Congress	7,382	55.09	4	7,493	55.91	4	8
Democratic Alliance	5,586	41.69	3	5,634	42.04	3	6
Independent Ratepayers Association of SA	174	1.30	0	89	0.66	0	0
Freedom Front Plus	136	1.02	0	95	0.71	0	0
Pan Africanist Congress of Azania	121	0.90	0	90	0.67	0	0
Total	13,399	100.00	7	13,401	100.00	7	14
Valid votes	13,399	98.86		13,401	98.94		
Invalid/blank votes	155	1.14		144	1.06		
Total votes	13,554	100.00		13,545	100.00		
Registered voters/turnout	23,164	58.51		23,164	58.47		

=== By-elections from May 2011 to August 2016 ===
The following by-elections were held to fill vacant ward seats in the period between the election in May 2011 and the dissolution of the municipality in August 2016.

Date	Ward	Party of the previous councillor	Party of the newly elected councillor
20 January 2016	5	Democratic Alliance	Democratic Alliance
