= Compatriots of South Africa =

Political party in South Africa

- Founder: Cheslin Felix
- Founded: 2018
- National Assembly seats: 0 / 400
- Provincial Legislatures: 0 / 430

Website
- compatriotsofsouthafrica.com

Compatriots of South Africa (CSA) is a South African political party that focuses its efforts on Coloured South Africans, titling its manifesto "The Manifesto for the Forgotten People of South Africa".

The party is supportive of land expropriation without compensation for the descendants of the "Khoi, San, Griqua and Bushmen".

CSA contested the 2019 general election at national level only, failing to win a seat.

The party contested a number of wards in the 2021 local government elections, winning one seat in the Dr Beyers Naudé Local Municipality.

== Election results ==
=== National elections ===
Election	Total votes	Share of vote	Seats	+/–	Government
2019	3,406	0.02%	0 / 400	–	extraparliamentary
