= Abraham Isaac Steytler =

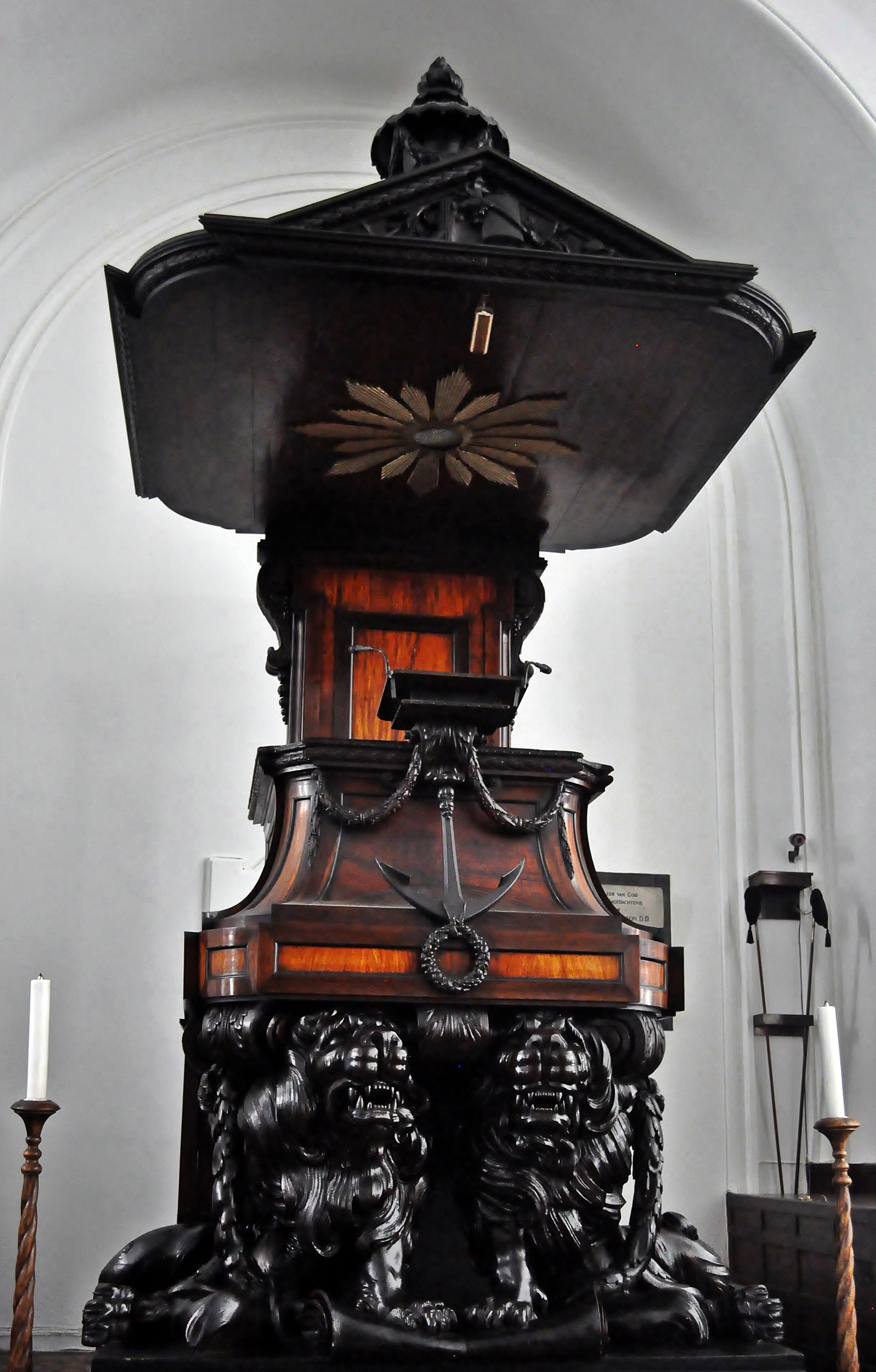
Pulpit of the Groote Kerk.

Abraham Isaac Steytler (5 February 1840 - 17 December 1922) was a minister of the Nederduitse Gereformeerde Kerk in South Africa. He was dubbed the "Nederduitse Gereformeerde Pous" ("Dutch Reformed Pope") due to his great influence.

== Biography ==
Steytler was born in Sea Point, a suburb of Cape Town in 1840, and attended the school of renowned Dr Changuion, after which he went to England and the Netherlands and returned with a degree in theology from the University of Utrecht. He became a preacher in the Uitenhage NG Church in 1863. The town of Steytlerville was founded after members were cut off from his congregation.

He was called to Cape Town (Groote Kerk, Cape Town) in 1881, where he stayed for the remainder of his career. He was also Moderator of the Cape Synod of the Dutch Reformed Church. He retired in October 1915 and died on 17 December 1922.
