= Ezinqoleni Local Municipality =

Coordinates: 30°47′S 30°08′E

Ezinqoleni
- Former local municipality
- Location in KwaZulu-Natal
- Country: South Africa
- Province: KwaZulu-Natal
- District: Ugu
- Seat: Izingolweni
- Wards: 6

Government
  - Type: Municipal council
  - Mayor: Makhosezwe Amon Mpisi

Area
  - Total: 648 km^{2} (250 sq mi)

Population (2011)
  - Total: 52,540
  - Density: 81.1/km^{2} (210/sq mi)

Racial makeup (2011)
  - Black African: 98.7%
  - Coloured: 0.2%
  - Indian/Asian: 0.2%
  - White: 0.8%

First languages (2011)
  - Zulu: 95.2%
  - Xhosa: 1.7%
  - English: 1.1%
  - Other: 2%
- Time zone: UTC+2 (SAST)
- Municipal code: KZN215

Ezinqoleni Local Municipality was an administrative area in the Ugu District of KwaZulu-Natal in South Africa.

Ezinqoleni is an isiZulu name word meaning "at the wagons". Traffic in the early days was by wagon drawn by donkeys and post carts drawn by mules.

There is an acute shortage of basic services and facilities, housing, and employment.

After municipal elections on 3 August 2016 it was merged into the larger Ray Nkonyeni Local Municipality.

== Main places ==
The 2001 census divided the municipality into the following main places:

Place	Code	Area (km^{2})	Population
Mthimude	50502	120.25	14,661
Oribi Gorge Nature Reserve	50503	9.59	0
Qinisela Manyuswa	50504	121.97	9,622
Vuxuzithathe	50505	84.87	26,757
Remainder of the municipality	50501	309.46	3,386

== Politics ==
The municipal council consists of eleven members elected by mixed-member proportional representation. Six councillors are elected by first-past-the-post voting in six wards, while the remaining five are chosen from party lists so that the total number of party representatives is proportional to the number of votes received. In the election of 18 May 2011 the African National Congress (ANC) won a majority of eight seats on the council. The following table shows the results of the election.

Party	Votes				Seats		
Party	Ward	List	Total	%	Ward	List	Total
ANC	9,733	10,185	19,918	67.3	6	2	8
NFP	2,691	2,250	4,941	16.7	0	2	2
IFP	1,907	1,865	3,772	12.8	0	1	1
DA	209	233	442	1.5	0	0	0
COPE	162	130	292	1.0	0	0	0
ACDP	85	132	217	0.7	0	0	0
Total	14,787	14,795	29,582	100.0	6	5	11
Spoilt votes	347	362	709				
