= Modimolle Local Municipality =

Municipality in Limpopo, South Africa

Modimolle
- Local municipality
- Seal

- Location in Limpopo
- Coordinates: 24°25′S 28°15′E
- Country: South Africa
- Province: Limpopo
- District: Waterberg
- Seat: Modimolle
- Wards: 9

Government
  - Type: Municipal council
  - Mayor: Marlene van Staden

Area
  - Total: 4,678 km^{2} (1,806 sq mi)

Population (2011)
  - Total: 68,513
  - Density: 14.65/km^{2} (37.93/sq mi)

Racial makeup (2011)
  - Black African: 88.1%
  - Coloured: 0.4%
  - Indian/Asian: 0.4%
  - White: 10.8%

First languages (2011)
  - Northern Sotho: 62.6%
  - Afrikaans: 10.7%
  - Tsonga: 9.3%
  - Tswana: 5.0%
  - Other: 12.4%
- Time zone: UTC+2 (SAST)
- Municipal code: LIM365

Modimolle Local Municipality was a municipality located in the Waterberg District Municipality of Limpopo province, South Africa. The seat of Modimolle Local Municipality was Modimolle.

After municipal elections on 3 August 2016 it was merged into the new and larger Modimolle–Mookgophong Local Municipality.

== Main places ==
The 2001 census divided the municipality into the following main places:

| Place | Code | Area (km^{2}) | Population | Most spoken language |
|---|---|---|---|---|
| Nylstroom | 91702 | 15.37 | 8,727 | Afrikaans |
| Phagameng | 91703 | 4.26 | 25,078 | Sepedi |
| Vaalwater | 91704 | 2.67 | 8,337 | Sepedi |
| Remainder of the municipality | 91701 | 6,205.57 | 30,642 | Sepedi |

== Politics ==
The municipal council consisted of eighteen members elected by mixed-member proportional representation. Nine councillors were elected by first-past-the-post voting in nine wards, while the remaining nine were chosen from party lists so that the total number of party representatives was proportional to the number of votes received. In the election of 18 May 2011 the African National Congress (ANC) won a majority of thirteen seats on the council. The following table shows the results of the election.

| Party | Votes | | | | Seats | | |
| Party | Ward | List | Total | % | Ward | List | Total |
|---|---|---|---|---|---|---|---|
| ANC | 10,369 | 11,670 | 22,039 | 66.2 | 7 | 6 | 13 |
| DA | 3,483 | 3,633 | 7,116 | 21.4 | 2 | 2 | 4 |
| VF+ | 932 | 835 | 1,767 | 5.3 | 0 | 1 | 1 |
| Independent | 1,515 | – | 1,515 | 4.6 | 0 | – | 0 |
| COPE | 159 | 307 | 466 | 1.4 | 0 | 0 | 0 |
| ACDP | 97 | 100 | 197 | 0.6 | 0 | 0 | 0 |
| APC | 50 | 128 | 178 | 0.5 | 0 | 0 | 0 |
| Total | 16,605 | 16,673 | 33,278 | 100.0 | 9 | 9 | 18 |
| Spoilt votes | 417 | 456 | 873 | | | | |
