= Moshaweng =

- Village
- Location in Botswana
- Coordinates: 24°27′5″S 25°2′1″E
- Country: Botswana
- District: Kweneng District

Population (2001)
  - Total: 974

Moshaweng is a village in Kweneng District of Botswana. It is located 60 km west of Molepolole. The population of Moshaweng was 974 in 2001 census.

It was the ancient name of Gaborone.
