= 2011 South African municipal elections =

South African municipal elections held on 18 August 2011

- 18 May 2011

All councillors for all 8 metropolitan municipalities All councillors for all 226 local municipalities 40% of councillors for all 44 district municipalities
- Turnout: 57.6% (▲9.65pp)
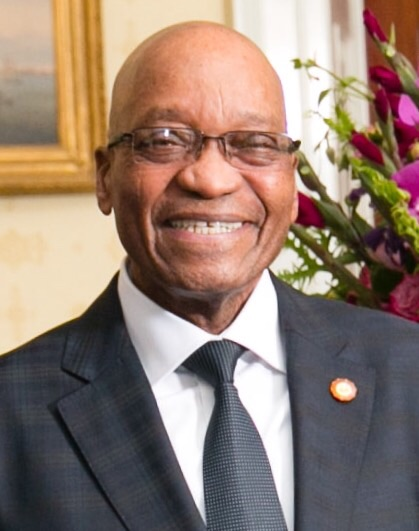

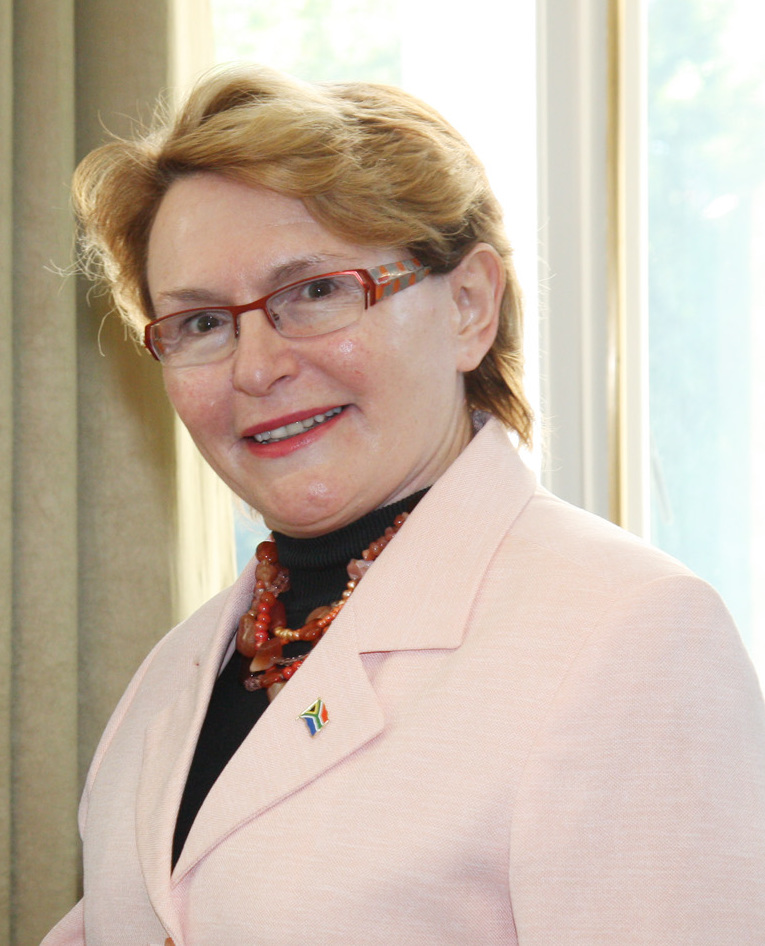

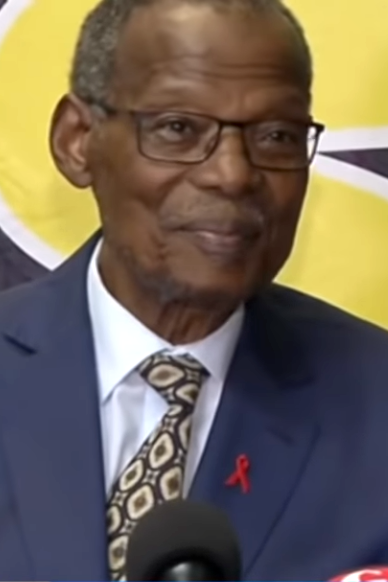
	First party	Second party	Third party
Leader	Jacob Zuma	Helen Zille	Mangosuthu Buthelezi
Party	ANC	DA	IFP
Last election	64.82%	16.24%	7.53%
Popular vote	16,548,970	6,393,890	954,021
Percentage	61.95%	23.94%	3.57%
Swing	▼2.87%	▲7.7%	▼3.96%
- Map showing the outcome of the election in the metropolitan and local municipalities ANC majority ANC plurality DA majority DA plurality IFP majority IFP plurality NFP majority NFP plurality ANC, DA tied ANC, IFP tied Other party plurality

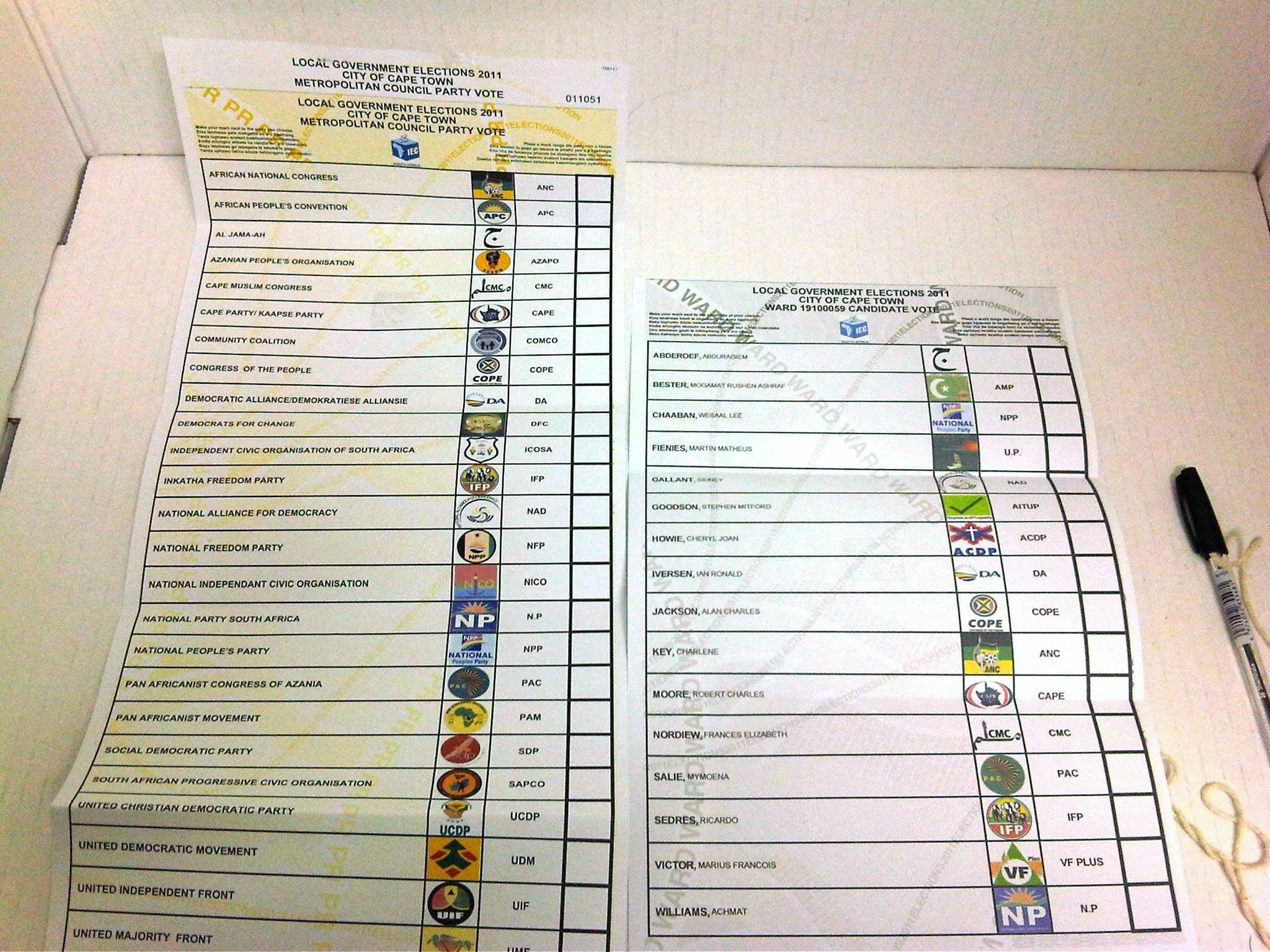
Two ballot papers from the 2011 South African municipal election in Cape Town. The ballot on the left is for the party-list proportional representation vote for the Cape Town City Council and the ballot on the right is for the election of the local councillor in Ward 59.

Municipal elections were held in South Africa on 18 May 2011, electing new councils for all municipalities in the country. Municipal elections are held every five years, and the previous municipal elections were held in 2006. The first municipal elections following the reorganisation of municipalities took place in December 2000.

Half of the seats (rounded up for odd numbers) in each municipality are elected on the first past the post system in single member wards. The other half of the seats are allocated to restore proportionality as follows:

The total number of seats are allocated using the largest remainder method by using a modified Hare quota. Proportional seats are allocated based on the difference. Overhang seats are theoretically possible. These do not affect the quota but will reduce the number of remainder seats if any. Independent candidates are allowed for in the ward seats, and the proportionality calculations effectively ignore votes for these candidates and are adjusted for seats allocated to them.

== Background ==
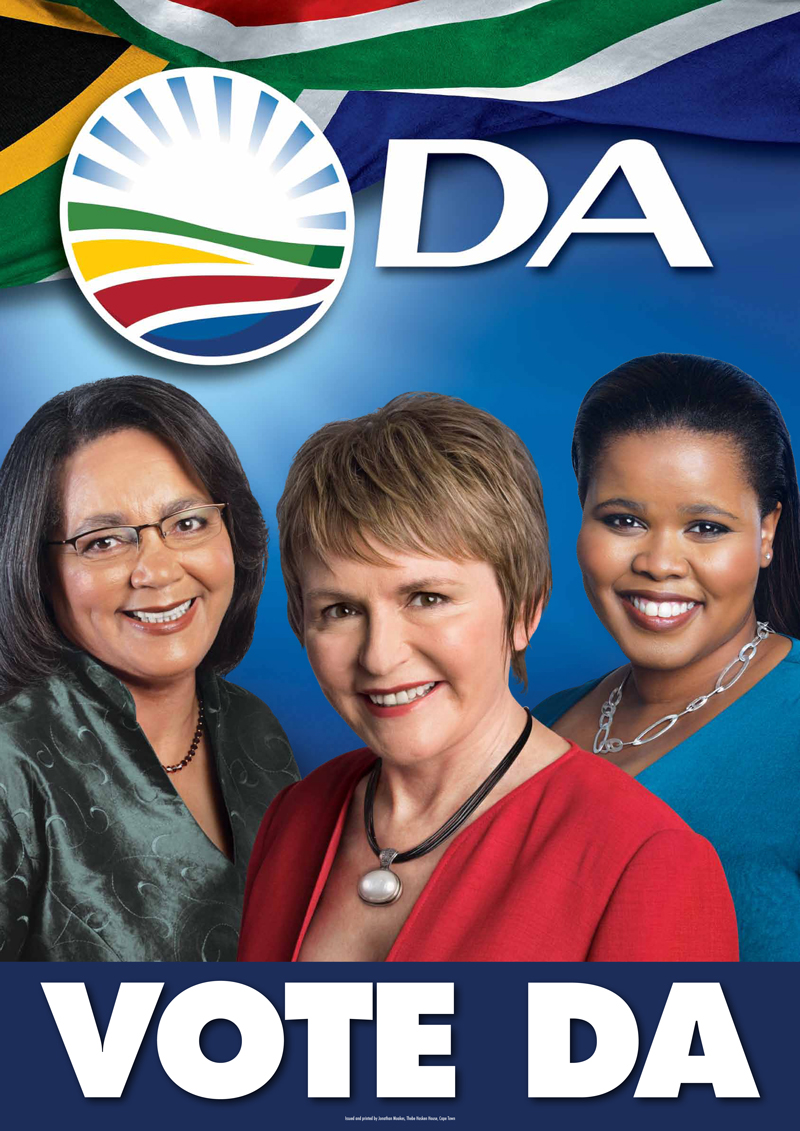
Election campaign poster for the Democratic Alliance

The ruling party of South Africa, the African National Congress (ANC), has been facing a growing opposition from the Democratic Alliance (DA). The DA holds control of the Western Cape area, with Cape Town the major city of the province. The DA had made it known that there was a possibility of victory in the Northern Cape province.

The ANC faced tough challenges from the opposition parties over issues of service delivery, corruption, healthcare reform, poverty and unemployment rates.

The Congress of the People (COPE) (a breakaway party formed from within the ANC) and the Inkatha Freedom Party (IFP) were determined to prove that they could increase their control in areas as well. Various other parties were expected to contest the elections as well; however, based on previous elections and expected changes since then, they are expected to hold a minority power relative to the ANC, DA, Cope and IFP parties respectively.

The election was generally peaceful, with the exception of an attack on an IFP councilor that resulted in his death.

=== Cities ===
Former DA leader Helen Zille attempted to improve her party's success at multi-party governance in Cape Town and also bring the ANC's support under 50% in other major cities. Initial reports suggested that Port Elizabeth was the most vulnerable for the ANC, with Pretoria, Johannesburg, Ekurhuleni and almost all municipalities in the Northern Cape facing stiff challenges from the DA and COPE.

Port Elizabeth lies in a unique region roughly at the border between the Black and Coloured (i.e. mixed raced) population groups. It was predicted that there would be a strong effort from minorities in the city to try to gain control of the council. Although the Nelson Mandela Bay municipality is over 60% black, the DA hoped that by using COPE and the United Democratic Movement, the vote for the ANC could have possibly been lowered under 50% (i.e. minority power) enabling the DA to form a coalition with smaller parties and assume governance of the area. The Nelson Mandela Bay municipality was heavily contested in the elections with the ANC managing to secure 63 seats to the DA's 48 seats. Zille attributed the failure of the DA to win the metro to the decline of COPE, claiming that the latter's retention of votes could have unseated the ANC allowing a coalition government in the metro.

=== Election boycott ===
The Poor People's Alliance called for a boycott of the election under the slogan No Land! No House! No Vote!

There were vote boycott campaigns by a number of civil society organisations including Soundz of the South, the Mandela Park Backyarders, the Mitchell's Plain Backyarders Association and various communities such as Blikkiesdorp in Western Cape, Morutsi in Limpopo, King William's Town and Grahamstown in the Eastern Cape, Cato Ridge in KwaZulu-Natal, Ermelo in Mpumalanga and elsewhere around the country.

There was also significant abstention by ANC members and supporters who felt the selection of ANC candidates was biased but refused to vote for any other party.

== Election results ==
The statistics in this section are all sourced from the Independent Electoral Commission's official website unless specified otherwise.

Map showing the outcome of the election in the metropolitan and local municipalities ANC majority ANC plurality DA majority DA plurality IFP majority IFP plurality NFP majority NFP plurality ANC, DA tied ANC, IFP tied Other party plurality

Map showing the party of the elected councillor in each ward. ANC DA IFP NFP Other party Independent

The voter turnout for this election was predicted to be higher than the previous election in 2006. 23.65 million people were registered to vote (with more than five million people eligible to vote not being registered), while the actual turnout of voters was 13.66 million people representing a 57.64% turnout, making it the highest voter turnout ever since the first municipal election in 2000. The percentage of spoilt votes was 1.89%.

The ANC won just under 62% of the vote and the DA won just under 24% of the vote. There was a decline in ANC support and an increase in support for the DA as the ANC lost voters in every province with the exception of Kwa-ZuluNatal where it captured votes from former IFP voters.

Party	Ward		PR		Ward + PR		DC	
Party	Votes	%	Votes	%	Votes	%	Votes	%
ANC	8,143,397	61.0%	8,405,429	62.9%	16,548,826	62.0%	5,455,411	69.4%
DA	3,177,883	23.8%	3,216,006	24.1%	6,393,886	23.9%	1,202,562	15.3%
IFP	478,400	3.6%	475,621	3.6%	954,021	3.6%	406,319	5.2%
NFP	326,565	2.4%	318,352	2.4%	644,917	2.4%	247,340	3.1%
COPE	274,074	2.1%	296,624	2.2%	570,698	2.1%	236,396	3.0%
UDM	83,728	0.6%	84,623	0.6%	168,351	0.6%	67,487	0.9%
ACDP	86,865	0.7%	78,737	0.6%	165,602	0.6%	43,948	0.6%
VF+	66,588	0.5%	53,931	0.4%	120,519	0.5%	32,640	0.4%
PAC	63,976	0.5%	54,846	0.4%	118,822	0.4%	28,918	0.4%
MF	60,153	0.5%	53,042	0.4%	113,195	0.4%	958	0.0%
APC	38,159	0.3%	54,332	0.4%	92,491	0.3%	22,650	0.3%
UCDP	25,031	0.2%	25,971	0.2%	51,002	0.2%	466	0.0%
AZAPO	24,331	0.2%	26,300	0.2%	50,631	0.2%	19,202	0.2%
108 other parties	202,595	1.5%	213,697	1.6%	416,292	1.6%	93,512	1.2%
Independent	302,242	2.3%	N/A		302,242	1.1%	N/A	
Total	13,353,987		13,357,511		26,711,498		7,857,809	
Spoilt votes	235,014		235,345		470,359		196,248	

Note: "Ward" column indicates votes cast for individual ward councillors. "PR" column indicates proportional representation votes cast for parties in the election of local and metropolitan municipal councils. "DC" column indicate proportional representation votes cast for parties for the directly elected components of district councils. All voters cast Ward and PR ballots, but those resident in the metropolitan municipalities (approximately 40% of the population) do not cast DC ballots.

=== Eastern Cape ===
In the Eastern Cape, the ANC captured a majority in all but one municipality; the lone exception, Baviaans, was won by the DA with four seats to the ANC's three. The Nelson Mandela Bay Metro was closely contested however, with the ANC dropping 15% of the vote, but retaining a narrow majority.

Metropolitan Municipalities
Municipality	ANC	COPE	DA	UDM	Others	Total	Control
Buffalo City	71	3	21	0	5	100	ANC Majority
Nelson Mandela Bay	63	6	48	1	2	120	ANC Majority
Two-tier Municipalities
Camdeboo	8	0	6	0	0	14	ANC Majority
Blue Crane Route	7	0	4	0	0	11	ANC Majority
Ikwezi	5	0	2	0	0	7	ANC Majority
Makana	20	1	6	0	1	28	ANC Majority
Ndlambe	13	0	6	0	1	20	ANC Majority
Sundays River Valley	12	0	3	0	1	16	ANC Majority
Baviaans	3	0	4	0	0	7	DA Majority
Kouga	15	0	14	0	0	29	ANC Majority
Kou-Kamma	6	0	5	0	0	11	ANC Majority
Mbhashe	41	9	1	7	3	61	ANC Majority
Mnquma	47	7	2	4	2	62	ANC Majority
Great Kei	11	0	2	0	0	13	ANC Majority
Amahlathi	33	3	2	0	2	40	ANC Majority
Ngqushwa	24	0	1	0	0	25	ANC Majority
Nkonkobe	35	2	2	0	2	41	ANC Majority
Nxuba	5	0	2	0	1	8	ANC Majority
Inxuba Yethemba	12	0	6	0	0	18	ANC Majority
Tsolwana	7	1	1	0	1	10	ANC Majority
Inkwanca	5	1	1	0	0	7	ANC Majority
Lukhanji	45	2	5	1	1	54	ANC Majority
Intsika Yethu	37	2	0	2	1	42	ANC Majority
Emalahleni	30	1	1	1	1	34	ANC Majority
Engcobo	35	0	0	3	2	40	ANC Majority
Sakhisizwe	14	1	1	0	1	17	ANC Majority
Elundini	28	0	2	2	2	34	ANC Majority
Senqu	32	0	2	1	2	37	ANC Majority
Maletswai	9	0	2	1	0	12	ANC Majority
Gariep	7	0	3	0	0	10	ANC Majority
Ngquza Hill	55	4	1	1	1	62	ANC Majority
Port St Johns	32	1	2	1	3	39	ANC Majority
Nyandeni	53	2	2	4	0	61	ANC Majority
Mhlontlo	48	1	0	3	0	52	ANC Majority
King Sabata Dalindyebo	46	2	2	18	2	70	ANC Majority
Matatiele	39	2	3	1	7	52	ANC Majority
Umzimvubu	46	1	2	2	3	54	ANC Majority
Mbizana	54	2	1	1	3	61	ANC Majority
Ntabankulu	31	2	1	1	1	36	ANC Majority
Total	1084	56	169	55	51	1415	

=== Free State ===
The ANC won a majority in every municipality in the Free State, including the newly upgraded Mangaung Metropolitan Municipality, in which it won 65 of the 97 available seats, against the DA's 26.

Municipality	ANC	COPE	DA	Others	Total
Mangaung	65	3	26	3	97
Letsemeng	8	1	2	0	11
Kopanong	10	1	3	1	15
Mohokare	9	0	2	0	11
Naledi	6	1	1	0	8
Masilonyana	16	1	2	1	20
Tokologo	5	1	1	1	8
Tswelopele	12	1	2	0	15
Matjhabeng	52	3	16	1	72
Nala	18	2	3	1	24
Setsoto	26	2	6	1	35
Dihlabeng	30	1	8	1	40
Nketoana	14	0	2	2	18
Maluti-a-Phofung	52	1	4	12	69
Phumelela	12	0	3	0	15
Mantsopa	13	1	3	0	17
Moqhaka	34	3	11	2	50
Ngwathe	28	1	9	1	39
Metsimaholo	26	0	15	1	42
Mafube	12	2	3	0	17
Total	448	25	122	28	623

=== Gauteng ===
The ANC won a majority in all but one of the municipalities in Gauteng, the lone exception being Midvaal, which was won by the DA. The following table shows the number of seats won by the various parties in the metropolitan and local municipalities in the province.

Municipality	ANC	COPE	DA	IFP	VF+	Others	Total
Ekurhuleni (East Rand)	125	2	62	2	1	10	202
City of Johannesburg	153	3	90	4	1	9	260
City of Tshwane (Pretoria)	118	2	82	0	4	4	210
Emfuleni	64	1	21	0	1	2	89
Midvaal	11	0	15	0	1	0	27
Lesedi	19	0	6	0	1	0	26
Mogale City (Krugersdorp)	41	1	23	1	1	1	68
Randfontein	27	1	16	0	0	0	44
Westonaria	23	1	4	1	0	2	31
Merafong City	41	1	11	1	0	2	56
Total	622	11	330	9	10	30	1013

=== KwaZulu-Natal ===
Outcome of the election in KwaZulu-Natal ANC outright winner ANC largest party IFP outright winner IFP largest party NFP outright winner NFP largest party ANC, IFP tied

In the following table, green rows indicate municipalities won by the ANC, red rows indicate those won by the Inkatha Freedom Party (IFP), yellow rows indicate those won by the National Freedom Party (NFP), and grey rows indicate those with no majority party.

Municipality	ANC	DA	IFP	NFP	Others	Total	Coalitions
eThekwini	126	43	9	10	17	205	
Vulamehlo	12	0	2	5	0	20	
Umdoni	12	4	1	1	1	19	
Umzumbe	26	1	2	8	1	38	
uMuziwabantu	12	1	2	4	0	19	
Ezingoleni	8	0	1	2	0	11	
Hibiscus Coast	41	11	3	2	1	58	
uMshwathi	19	2	3	2	0	26	
uMngeni	14	9	0	0	0	23	
Mpofana	5	1	1	0	0	7	
Impendle	6	0	1	0	0	7	
Msunduzi	49	15	4	4	1	73	
Mkhambathini	9	1	3	1	0	14	
Richmond	11	1	0	0	2	14	
Emnambithi/Ladysmith	34	4	8	6	1	53	
Indaka	6	0	8	6	0	20	ANC-NFP
Umtshezi	8	1	5	3	0	17	ANC-NFP
Okhahlamba	13	1	8	6	0	28	ANC-NFP
Imbabazane	12	1	5	7	0	25	ANC-NFP
Endumeni	6	3	2	1	0	12	ANC-NFP
Nquthu	14	1	14	5	0	34	ANC-NFP
Msinga	12	0	21	4	0	37	
Umvoti	10	1	9	2	0	22	ANC-NFP
Newcastle	33	5	12	5	6	61	
eMadlangeni	4	1	2	1	0	8	ANC-NFP
Dannhauser	11	1	6	3	1	22	ANC-NFP
eDumbe	4	1	2	8	0	15	
uPhongolo	11	1	7	8	0	27	ANC-NFP
Abaqulusi	17	3	16	7	1	44	ANC-NFP
Nongoma	6	0	17	19	0	42	NFP-ANC
Ulundi	6	0	28	13	0	47	
uMhlabuyalingana	22	0	8	4	0	34	
Jozini	20	0	16	4	0	40	ANC-NFP
The Big Five False Bay	3	0	3	1	0	7	ANC-NFP
Hlabisa	4	0	8	4	0	16	ANC-NFP
Mtubatuba	16	0	15	7	0	38	ANC-NFP
Mbonambi	17	0	10	3	0	30	
uMhlathuze	36	6	10	6	2	60	
Ntambanana	7	0	6	3	0	16	ANC-NFP
uMlalazi	24	1	18	9	0	52	ANC-NFP
Mthonjaneni	5	0	5	1	0	11	ANC-NFP
Nkandla	11	0	13	3	0	27	ANC-NFP
Mandeni	23	1	4	6	0	34	
KwaDukuza	37	8	4	2	2	53	
Ndwedwe	25	1	5	5	1	37	
Maphumulo	12	0	8	2	0	22	
Ingwe	16	1	3	2	0	22	
Kwa Sani	5	2	0	0	0	7	
Greater Kokstad	12	3	0	0	1	16	
Ubuhlebezwe	18	1	2	3	0	24	
Umzimkhulu	36	0	1	2	1	40	
Total	906	137	341	210	39	1633	

=== Limpopo ===
The ANC's complete dominance of Limpopo remained unchallenged as other parties achieved only small minorities.

Municipality	ANC	COPE	DA	Others	Total
Greater Giyani	50	0	2	8	60
Greater Letaba	51	4	1	1	57
Greater Tzaneen	59	2	5	2	68
Ba-Phalaborwa	29	2	4	1	36
Maruleng	19	2	2	4	27
Musina	9	1	0	2	12
Mutale	23	1	1	1	26
Thulamela	70	2	3	5	80
Makhado	64	3	5	3	75
Blouberg	37	1	2	1	41
Aganang	32	2	1	2	37
Molemole	24	1	1	1	27
Polokwane	61	3	9	3	76
Lepelle-Nkumpi	47	4	2	4	57
Thabazimbi	16	0	5	2	23
Lephalale	20	1	3		24
Mookgophong	6	1	2	1	10
Modimolle	13	0	4	1	18
Bela-Bela	12	0	4	1	17
Mogalakwena	53	2	5	3	63
Ephraim Mogale	23	1	2	6	32
Elias Motsoaledi	41	1	4	14	60
Makhuduthamaga	52	3	1	5	61
Fetakgomo	21	2	1	1	25
Greater Tubatse	50	3	3	6	62
Total	882	42	72	78	1074

=== Mpumalanga ===
The ANC's control of this province was not significantly challenged with the DA only gaining some support in the more urbanised municipalities.

Municipality	ANC	COPE	DA	Others	Total
Albert Luthuli	44	1	3	1	49
Msukaligwa	31	1	5	1	38
Mkhondo	28	0	6	4	38
Pixley ka Seme	16	0	3	2	21
Lekwa	23	0	6	1	30
Dipaleseng	7	0	2	3	12
Govan Mbeki	45	1	16	1	63
Delmas	13	0	3	1	17
Emalahleni	49	0	18	1	68
Steve Tshwete	39	1	17	1	58
Emakhazeni	11	0	4	0	15
Thembisile Hani	51	0	4	9	64
Dr JS Moroka	52	1	4	5	62
Thaba Chweu	20	0	6	1	27
Mbombela	66	0	10	2	78
Umjindi	15	0	3	0	18
Nkomazi	60	0	4	1	65
Bushbuckridge	55	3	3	13	74
Total	625	8	117	47	797

=== North West ===
The North West remains firmly under ANC control with the DA getting some support in the larger towns.

Municipality	ANC	COPE	DA	Others	Total
Moretele	46	1	3	5	55
Madibeng	54	1	14	3	72
Rustenburg	55	1	15	5	76
Kgetlengrivier	9	0	3		12
Moses Kotane	49	4	3	6	62
Ratlou	22	2	1	3	28
Tswaing	22	0	7	1	30
Mafikeng	44	3	7	8	62
Ditsobotla	32	1	7	2	42
Ramotshere Moiloa	29	2	2	6	39
Naledi	12	1	5	0	18
Mamusa	12	1	2	0	15
Greater Taung	43	2	3	3	51
Lekwa-Teemane	10	1	3	0	14
Kagisano-Molopo	24	1	2	3	30
Ventersdorp	10	0	2	0	12
Tlokwe	30	1	19	2	52
Matlosana	51	1	16	2	70
Maquassi Hills	17	1	3	0	21
Total	571	24	117	49	761

=== Northern Cape ===
The ANC's control in this province was challenged only in the thinly populated Afrikaans speaking Karoo areas adjoining the DA dominated Western Cape. The more densely populated and Tswana dominated northern districts remain firmly in the hands of the ANC.

Municipality	ANC	COPE	DA	Others	Total	Coalitions
Richtersveld	5	0	3	0	8	
Nama Khoi	8	3	6	0	17	DA-COPE
Kamiesberg	4	1	2	0	7	
Hantam	4	1	4	0	9	DA-COPE
Karoo Hoogland	3	2	2	0	7	COPE-DA
Khâi-Ma	4	2	1	0	7	
Ubuntu	4	1	3	0	8	ANC
Umsobomvu	7	2	1	0	10	
Emthanjeni	7	1	5	1	14	ANC-IND
Kareeberg	4	1	2	0	7	
Renosterberg	4	2	1	0	7	
Thembelihle	5	2	1	0	8	
Siyathemba	4	2	1	0	7	
Siyancuma	7	2	2	0	11	
Mier	4	1	2	0	7	
Kai !Garib	10	3	4	0	17	
//Khara Hais	16	4	7	0	27	
!Kheis	4	2	1	0	7	
Tsantsabane	6	1	2	2	11	
Kgatelopele	5	1	2	0	8	
Sol Plaatje	40	5	16	1	62	
Dikgatlong	10	1	2	0	13	
Magareng	6	1	2	0	9	
Phokwane	13	1	3	1	18	
Joe Morolong	23	3	1	2	29	
Ga-Segonyana	20	1	3	1	25	
Gamagara	6	1	3	0	10	
Total	233	47	82	8	370	

=== Western Cape ===
Outcome of the election in the Western Cape DA outright winner DA largest party ANC outright winner ANC largest party ANC, DA tied ICOSA largest party KGP largest party

The Western Cape swung heavily to the DA, which won outright the City of Cape Town metropolitan municipality, as well as 11 of the 24 local municipalities in the province. In a further four local municipalities the DA was the largest party but did not hold a majority of seats. The ANC won outright only the Beaufort West Local Municipality, and was the largest party in the Cederberg Local Municipality but did not hold a majority there. Five local municipalities were evenly split between the ANC and the DA, with other parties holding the balance of power. In the Kannaland Local Municipality, the Independent Civic Organisation of South Africa won a plurality of three seats while the ANC and the DA won two each; a similar situation obtained in the Prince Albert Local Municipality, where the Karoo Gemeenskaps Party won three seats and the ANC and the DA two each.

In the following table, blue rows indicate municipalities won by the DA, green rows indicate those won by the ANC, and grey rows indicate those with no majority party.

Municipality	ANC	COPE	DA	Others	Total
City of Cape Town	73	3	135	10	221
Matzikama	6	0	7	2	15
Cederberg	5	1	4	1	11
Bergrivier	5	1	7	0	13
Saldanha Bay	8	1	15	1	25
Swartland	6	1	15	1	23
Witzenberg	8	1	10	4	23
Drakenstein	19	2	35	5	61
Stellenbosch	11	1	25	6	43
Breede Valley	14	1	22	4	41
Langeberg	7	1	11	4	23
Theewaterskloof	9	1	13	2	25
Overstrand	9	0	15	1	25
Cape Agulhas	4	0	4	1	9
Swellendam	4	0	4	1	9
Kannaland	2	0	2	3	7
Hessequa	6	1	7	1	15
Mossel Bay	10	0	16	1	27
George	19	1	25	4	49
Oudtshoorn	11	1	11	2	25
Knysna	7	1	10	1	19
Bitou	6	1	6	0	13
Laingsburg	3	1	3	0	7
Prince Albert	2	0	2	3	7
Beaufort West	7	0	5	1	13
Total	261	20	409	58	748
