= 2006 South African municipal elections =

- 1 March 2006

All seats to the municipalities of South Africa
- Turnout: 47.95% (▼0.10pp)
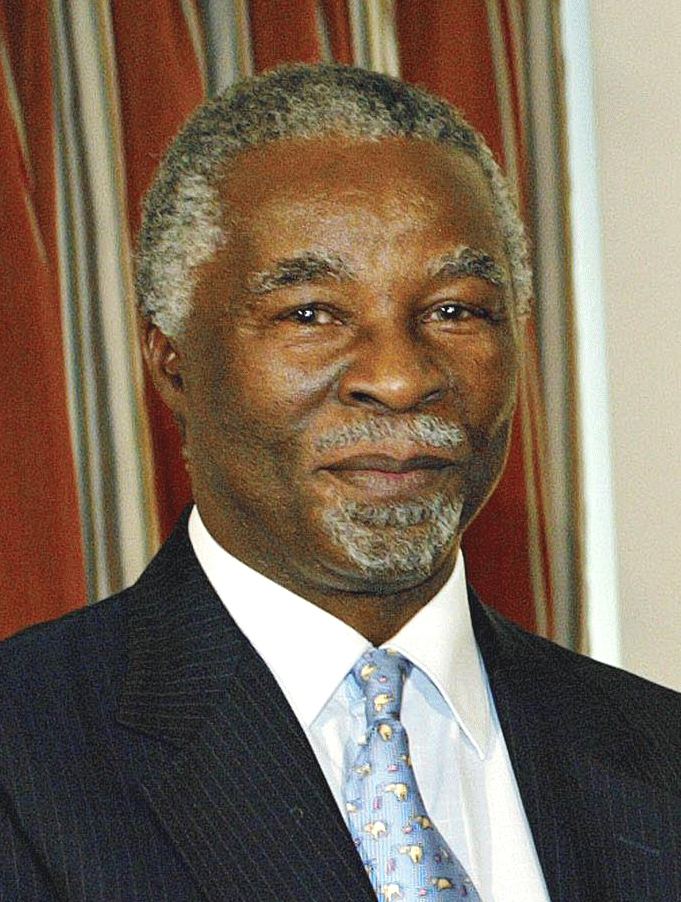

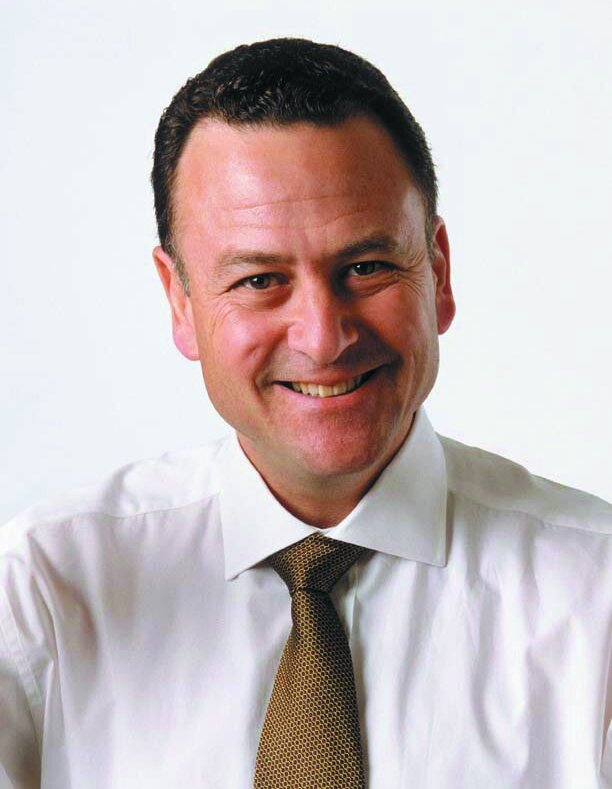

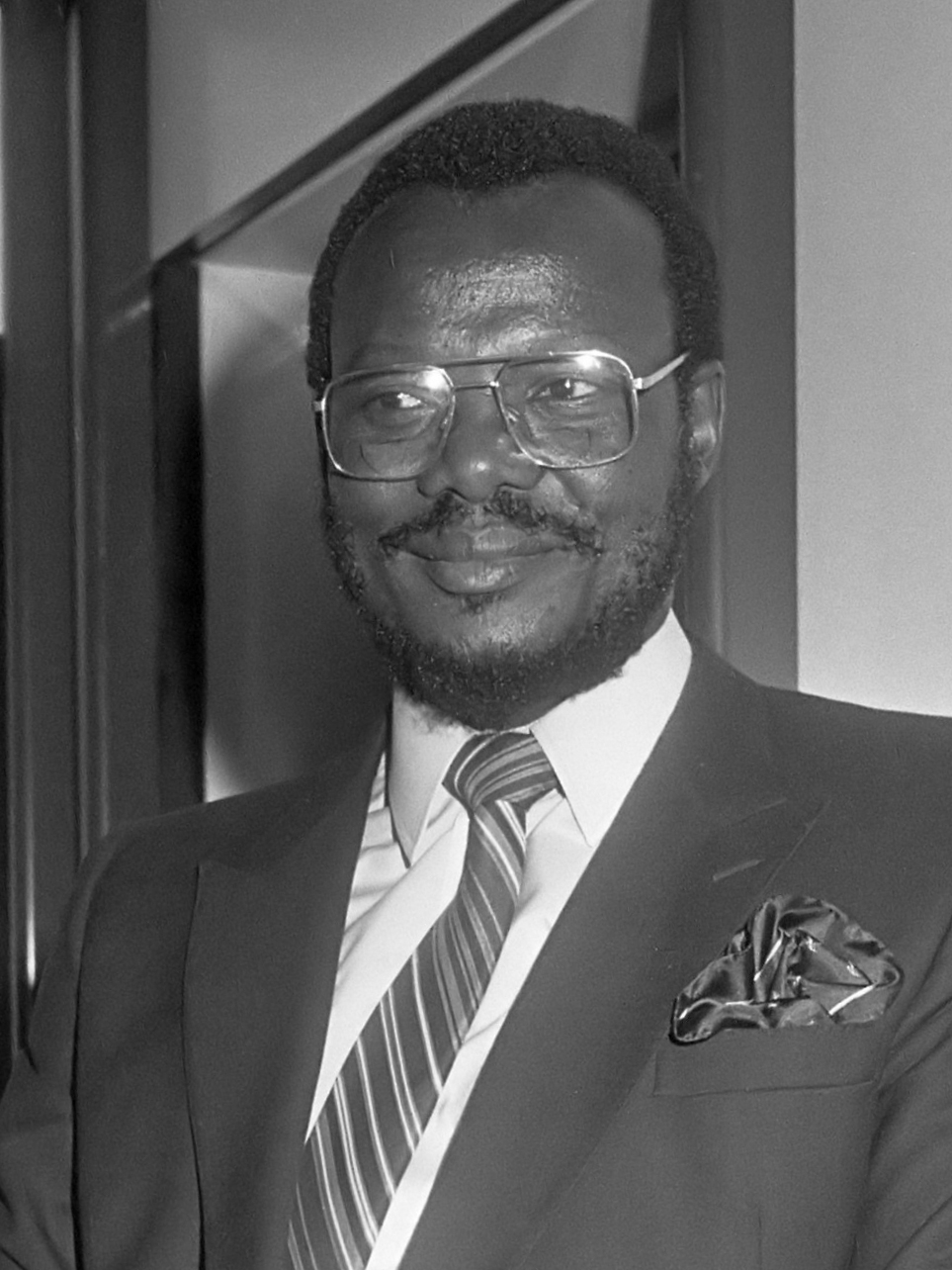

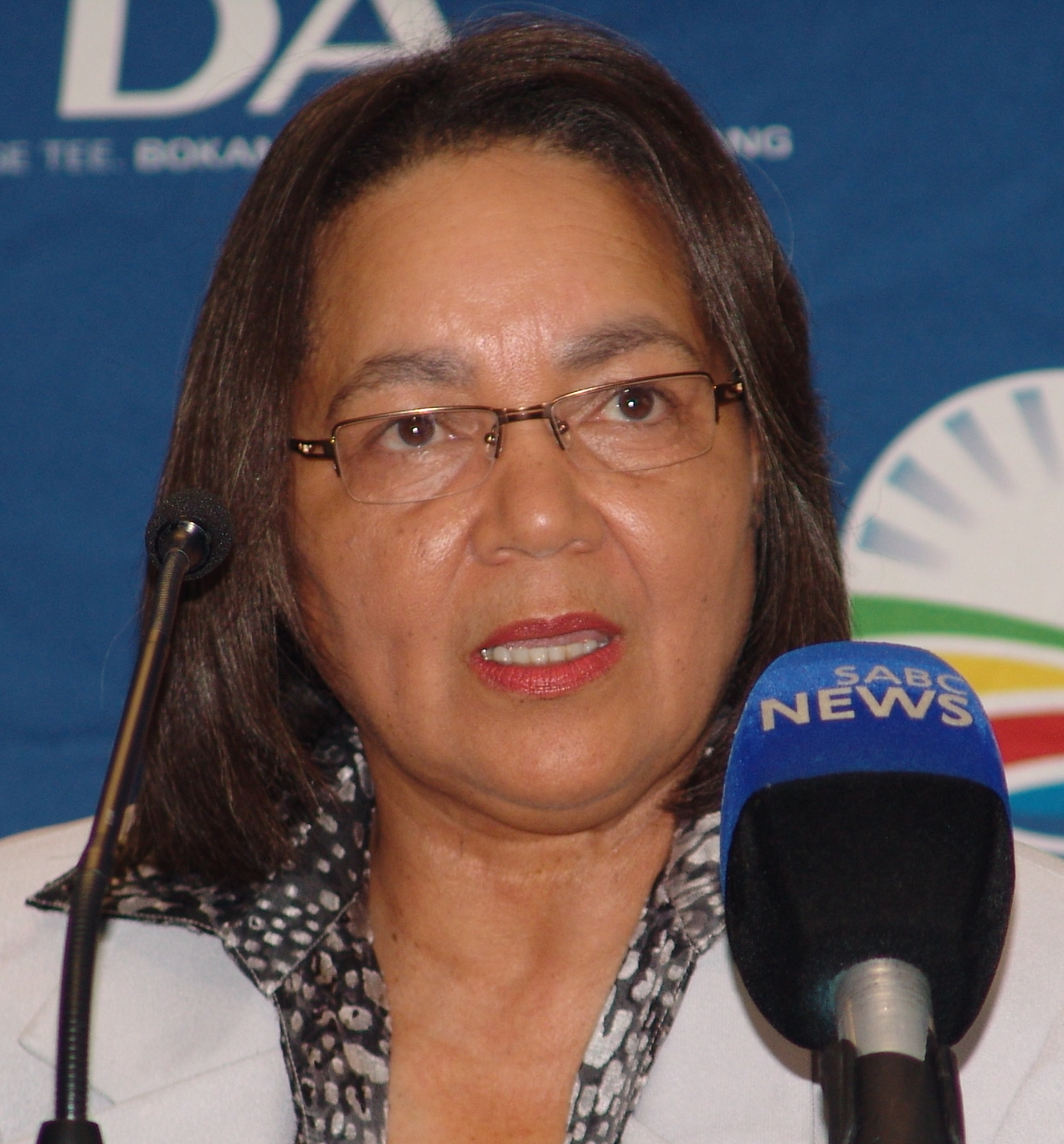
	First party	Second party
Leader	Thabo Mbeki	Tony Leon
Party	ANC	DA
Last election	59.39%	22.12%
Popular vote	12,783,813	3,203,896
Percentage	64.82%	16.24%
Swing	▲5.43%	▼5.88%
	Third party	Fourth party
Leader	Mangosuthu Buthelezi	Patricia de Lille
Party	IFP	ID
Last election	9.14%	did not contest
Popular vote	1,484,621	422,607
Percentage	7.53%	2.14%
Swing	▼1.61%	▲2.14% (new)
- A map of South Africa showing the 2006 local election results by local municipality.: ANC majority; ANC plurality; DA majority; DA plurality; IFP majority; IFP plurality; Other party plurality

Municipal elections were held in South Africa on 1 March 2006, to elect members to the local governing councils in the municipalities of South Africa. The municipalities form the local government of South Africa and are subdivisions of the provinces, thus making them responsible for local service delivery, such as electricity, water and fire services.

All major political parties, excepting the SACP who are members of the Tripartite alliance, fielded candidates in the election. The expected winner, the African National Congress (ANC) won the majority of seats nationwide, with 66.3% of the vote. These elections were seen as a test of the ANC, after some discontent with the speed of the delivery of new services at the municipal level in South Africa. The official opposition, the Democratic Alliance (DA) took 14.8% of votes nationwide, placing them in second overall. The Zulu-based Inkatha Freedom Party took 8.1% of the vote, or third place, while the new party formed under the leadership of Patricia de Lille, the Independent Democrats took 2.0%, placing them fourth of all major political parties.

However, because rural electors have an additional vote compared to urban voters (for district council), a fairer representation of popular party support is given by the percentage of proportional representation votes (excluding district council votes and ward votes) i.e. African National Congress (ANC) with 65.7% of the vote, the Democratic Alliance (DA) with 16.3% of votes nationwide, Inkatha Freedom Party with 7.6% of the vote and 2.2% for the Independent Democrats.

== Campaign ==
The campaign focused around the delivery of services, particularly to townships after 12 years of democracy in the country. Riots and large-scale protests had broken out before the elections in certain townships around the country. All parties promised to speed up delivery of services. In Durban the shack dwellers' movement Abahlali baseMjondolo boycotted the elections under the slogan 'No Land! No House! No Vote!'

== Results ==
The ANC won a majority in most of the councils of Northern Cape Province, North West Province, Gauteng Province, Mpumalanga Province, Limpopo Province and Eastern Cape Province.

The DA won the largest share of votes in the City of Cape Town but did not achieve a majority, and hence was not able to form a government on its own. The DA mayoral candidate Helen Zille formed the city government and was elected mayor with the support of numerous minority parties. This was achieved in spite of the Independent Democrats siding with the African National Congress. The ID subsequently joined the DA-led coalition, strengthening its majority.

The Inkatha Freedom Party won the majority in KwaZulu-Natal Province, although it lost support overall, when compared to the previous election, and did not win the major economic centres in the province.

=== Detailed national results ===
Party	Ward	%	PR*	%	Ward + PR	%	DC*	%	Total	%
African National Congress	6 314 393	64.1%	6 469 420	65.7%	12 783 813	64.9%	4 683 135	70.8%	17 466 948	66.3%
Democratic Alliance	1 595 742	16.2%	1 608 154	16.3%	3 203 896	16.3%	684 884	10.3%	3 888 780	14.8%
Inkatha Freedom Party	740 135	7.5%	744 486	7.6%	1 484 621	7.5%	635 521	9.6%	2 120 142	8.1%
Independent Democrats	204 846	2.1%	217 761	2.2%	422 607	2.1%	108 305	1.6%	530 912	2.0%
African Christian Democratic Party	122 478	1.2%	128 990	1.3%	251 468	1.3%	74 918	1.1%	326 386	1.2%
United Democratic Movement	100 352	1.0%	129 047	1.3%	229 399	1.2%	105 105	1.6%	334 504	1.3%
Pan Africanist Congress of Azania	108 741	1.1%	109 816	1.1%	218 557	1.1%	88 190	1.3%	306 747	1.2%
Vryheidsfront Plus	92 039	0.9%	93 921	1.0%	185 960	0.9%	66 293	1.0%	252 253	1.0%
United Christian Democratic Party	55 604	0.6%	62 459	0.6%	118 063	0.6%	60 755	0.9%	178 818	0.7%
Minority Front	42 255	0.4%	42 530	0.4%	84 785	0.4%		0.0%	84 785	0.3%
National Democratic Convention	32 250	0.3%	35 899	0.4%	68 149	0.4%	25 312	0.4%	93 461	0.4%
Azanian People's Organisation	25 773	0.3%	30 321	0.3%	56 094	0.3%	18 533	0.3%	74 627	0.3%
United Independent Front	25 072	0.3%	31 018	0.3%	56 090	0.3%	19 431	0.3%	75 521	0.3%
84 smaller parties	133 403	1.4%	148 058	1.5%	281 461	1.4%	48 197	0.7%	329 658	1.3%
Independent	263 991	2.7%	Not applicable		263 991	1.3%	Not applicable		263 991	1.0%
Total	9 857 074	100.0%	9 851 880	100.0%	19 708 954	100.0%	6 618 579	100.0%	26 327 533	100.0%

* PR=Proportional representation DC=District Council

=== Geography ===
A map of South Africa showing the 2006 local election results by local municipality.: ANC majority; ANC plurality; DA majority; DA plurality; IFP majority; IFP plurality; Other party plurality

The map to the right shows the winner in each of the six metropolitan municipalities, 231 local municipalities and 20 District Management Areas (DMAs) in South Africa.

- The ANC (green) won 5 metropolitan municipalities and 198 local municipalities.
- The IFP (red) won 26 local municipalities.
- The DA (blue) won 1 metropolitan municipality and 6 local municipalities.
- The Laingsburg Gemeenskaps Party (grey) won only the Laingsburg local municipality.

=== By Metropolitan Municipality ===
==== Nelson Mandela Bay ====
In the Nelson Mandela Bay Metropolitan Municipality, the ANC retained its majority in the metropolitan government, with Nondumiso Maphazi succeeding Nceba Faku as mayor of the municipality; Maphazi was also the first female mayor of the municipality. The ANC also captured 81 seats with 66.53 percent of the votes. The DA won 30 seats, the ID three and the other six seats were divided between smaller parties, including the FF+, ACDP, PAC and UIF.

==== Johannesburg ====
In the City of Johannesburg Metropolitan Municipality, the ANC retained its majority in the metropolitan government, and incumbent executive mayor Amos Masondo was re-elected to a second six-year term. The DA contested all wards, with opposition councillor Mike Moriarty unsuccessfully challenging Masondo for mayor.

==== Tshwane ====
In the City of Tshwane Metropolitan Municipality, the ANC retained its majority in the metropolitan government, with former Gauteng Health MEC Gwen Ramokgope elected to succeed Smangaliso Mkhatshwa as mayor of Tshwane; Ramokgope also became the first female mayor of the municipality. Gwen was challenged by DA councillor Fred Nel for the seat.

==== Ekurhuleni ====
In the Ekurhuleni Metropolitan Municipality, the ANC retained its majority in the metropolitan government, with incumbent mayor Duma Moses Nkosi re-elected to a second term in office. He was challenged by DA councillor Eddie Taylor.

==== eThekwini ====
In the eThekwini Metropolitan Municipality, the ANC retained its majority in the metropolitan government, with Obed Mlaba being elected to a third term (his second six-year term) in office as mayor of the municipality. The ANC's mandate was increased by an estimated 115,000 votes, at the expense of the IFP, as was the case in several other parts of KwaZulu-Natal.

==== Cape Town ====
In the City of Cape Town, the Democratic Alliance was the largest single party in the City Council with 90 of the 210 seats on the council, ahead of the African National Congress's 81 seats, but with no party holding a majority. The African Christian Democratic Party (ACDP) with 7 councillors, drew an unlikely array of five smaller political parties together to form a king-maker block of 16 Councillors that eventually agreed to work with the DA's 90 in a multi-party government (MPG) rather than the ANC /Independent Democrats alliance. The MPG's 106 councillors agreed to elect the DA's Helen Zille as Executive Mayor, the ACDP as Executive Deputy Mayor, the Speaker post was held by the one elected councillor from the Freedom Front Plus, whilst the United Democratic Movement (1 councillor), the Universal Party (1 councillor) and the Africa Muslim Party (2 councillors) took up seats on the Mayoral Committee. This fragile MPG survived until January 2007 when the AMP was expelled from the MPG for conspiring with the ANC. The ID was drawn into the MPG when the ACDP offered up its Executive Deputy Mayors post. This brought about a stable MPG

=== By district ===
==== Cacadu ====
In the Cacadu District Municipality, the African National Congress won Makana, Kouga, Ndlambe, Camdeboo, Sunday's River Valley, Blue Crane, Kou-Kamma, Ikwezi, and Aberdeen. The Democratic Alliance won Baviaans.

==== Sedibeng ====
In the Sedibeng District Municipality, the African National Congress won Emfuleni and Lesedi. The Democratic Alliance won Midvaal.

==== West Coast ====
In the West Coast District Municipality, the African National Congress won Matzikama, Cederberg, Bergrivier, and Saldanha Bay. The Democratic Alliance won Swartland.

==== Overberg ====
In the Overberg District Municipality, the African National Congress won Theewaterskloof, Cape Agulhas, and Swellendam. The Democratic Alliance won Overstrand.

==== Eden ====
In the Eden District Municipality, the African National Congress won Kannaland, Hessequa, Knysna, Oudtshoorn, and Bitou. The Democratic Alliance won Mossel Bay and George.

==== Central Karoo ====
In the Central Karoo District Municipality, the African National Congress won Beaufort West and Prince Albert. The Laingsburg Gemeenskaps Party won Laingsburg.
