= Willowmore =

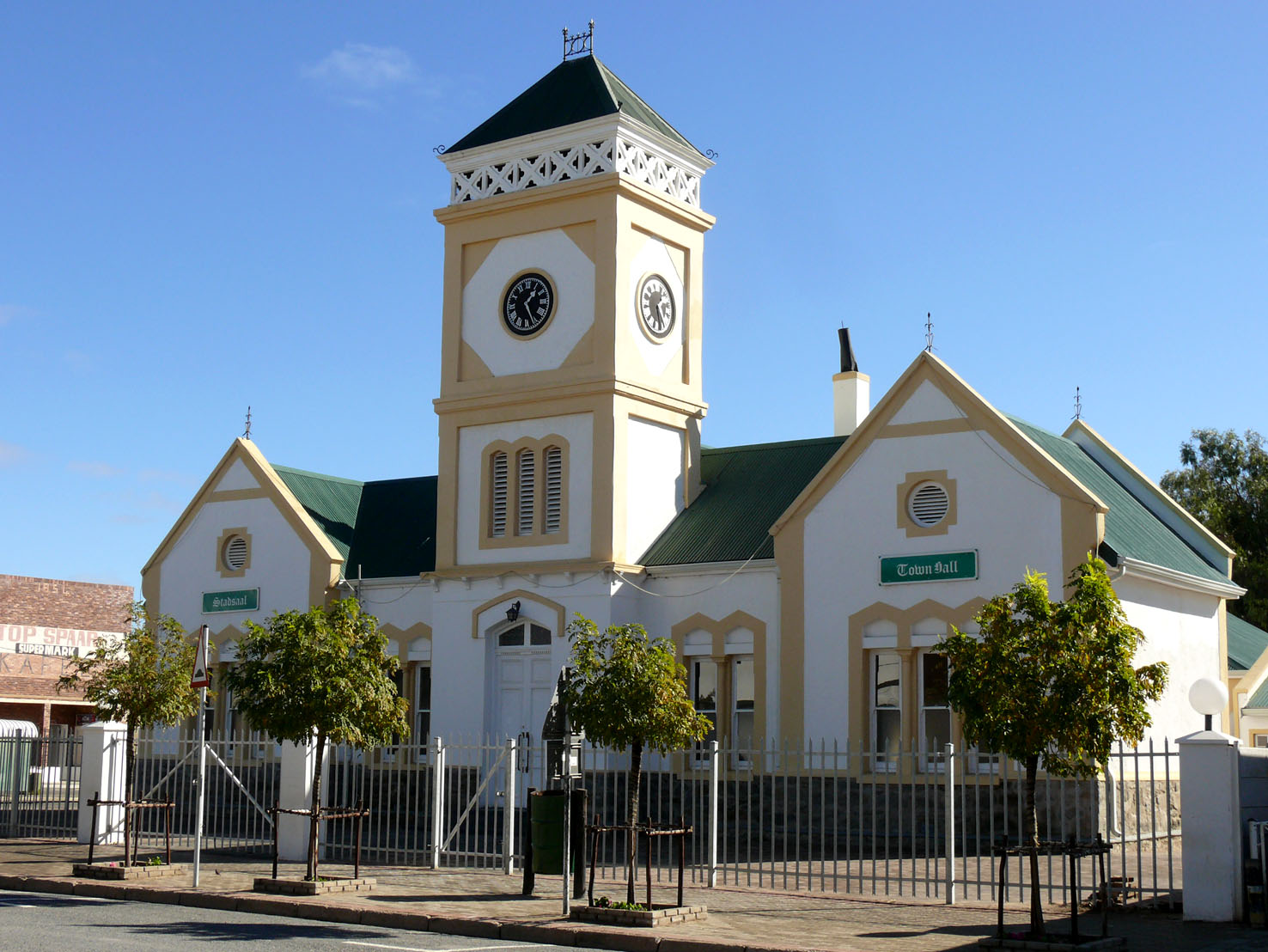
- Town hall

- Location within Eastern Cape Location within South Africa Location within Africa
- Coordinates: 33°17′S 23°29′E
- Country: South Africa
- Province: Eastern Cape
- District: Sarah Baartman
- Municipality: Dr Beyers Naudé

Area
  - Total: 21.74 km^{2} (8.39 sq mi)

Population (2011)
  - Total: 7,678
  - Density: 353.2/km^{2} (914.7/sq mi)

Racial makeup (2011)
  - Black African: 10.0%
  - Coloured: 86.3%
  - Indian/Asian: 0.2%
  - White: 3.0%
  - Other: 0.6%

First languages (2011)
  - Afrikaans: 94.6%
  - Xhosa: 3.2%
  - English: 1.2%
  - Other: 1.0%
- Time zone: UTC+2 (SAST)
- Postal code (street): 6445
- PO box: 6445
- Area code: 044

Willowmore is a town in Sarah Baartman District Municipality in the Eastern Cape province of South Africa.

Willowmore is an old-world Karoo town on the western border of the Eastern Cape. The population is about 7 700 and the town has many old buildings from both the Victorian and Edwardian periods.

== History ==
The town was founded in 1864 when J.P. Aughanbough bought part of the farm The Willows from William Moore. A tennis court was built on part of the land where a local sports club was later established. After the purchase, Willowmore became a commercial centre. The name was first Willow-Moore, but it was later simplified to Willowmore. Ten years after the tennis court was built, a church and magistrate's office followed. Another ten years later, on 28 February 1884, Willowmore became a municipality.

== Infrastructure ==
The railway line between Cape Town and Port Elizabeth reached the town in 1900. Willowmore is also located on a national road (N9) and the R329. The latter goes from here in an easterly direction and connects Aberdeen with Steytlerville. The N9 connects George and Colesberg and also passes Willowmore's neighbouring towns, Aberdeen to the north and Uniondale to the south, as well as Middelburg and Graaff-Reinet. The R407 also starts here and connects the town with Klaarstroom.

Willowmore is the service centre of an agricultural region where ostriches, sheep, goats, lucerne, citrus and tobacco are farmed (the latter two in the fertile Baviaanskloof). Willowmore is situated 140 km north-east of the town of Knysna and 117 km south-west of Aberdeen. It was laid out in 1862 on the farm The Willows. It is uncertain whether the name is derived from this farm name and that of its owner, William Moore, or from the maiden name of Petronella Catharina Lehmkuhl and a willow-tree near her house.
