= Tsolwana Local Municipality =

Coordinates: 32°01′S 26°16′E

Tsolwana
- Former local municipality
- Seal

- Location in the Eastern Cape
- Country: South Africa
- Province: Eastern Cape
- District: Chris Hani
- Seat: Tarkastad
- Wards: 5

Government
  - Type: Municipal council
  - Mayor: K Nqighi

Area
  - Total: 6,087 km^{2} (2,350 sq mi)

Population (2011)
  - Total: 33,281
  - Density: 5.468/km^{2} (14.16/sq mi)

Racial makeup (2011)
  - Black African: 91.0%
  - Coloured: 5.8%
  - Indian/Asian: 0.1%
  - White: 2.8%

First languages (2011)
  - Xhosa: 84.3%
  - Afrikaans: 8.5%
  - Sotho: 2.8%
  - English: 2.3%
  - Other: 2.1%
- Time zone: UTC+2 (SAST)
- Municipal code: EC132

Tsolwana Local Municipality was an administrative area in the Chris Hani District of the Eastern Cape in South Africa. Tsolwana is an isiXhosa name which means "something with a sharp ending or a tip", referring the mountains around the whole area. After municipal elections on 3 August 2016 it was merged into the larger Enoch Mgijima Local Municipality.

== Main places ==
The 2001 census divided the municipality into the following main places:

| Place | Code | Area (km^{2}) | Population |
|---|---|---|---|
| Amaqwati | 21901 | 34.36 | 7,777 |
| Amavundle | 21902 | 19.74 | 7,589 |
| Basoto | 21903 | 5.44 | 4,523 |
| Hofmeyer | 21904 | 4.57 | 3,199 |
| Lammermoor | 21905 | 1.09 | 3 |
| Tarkastad | 21906 | 1.89 | 1,858 |
| Zola | 21908 | 1.15 | 3,612 |
| Remainder of the municipality | 21907 | 5,956.66 | 3,949 |

== Politics ==
The municipal council consisted of ten members elected by mixed-member proportional representation. Five councillors were elected by first-past-the-post voting in five wards, while the remaining five were chosen from party lists so that the total number of party representatives was proportional to the number of votes received. In the election of 18 May 2011 the African National Congress (ANC) won a majority of seven seats on the council. The following table shows the results of the election.

| Party | Votes | | | | Seats | | |
| Party | Ward | List | Total | % | Ward | List | Total |
|---|---|---|---|---|---|---|---|
| ANC | 7,405 | 7,684 | 15,089 | 73.5 | 4 | 3 | 7 |
| COPE | 644 | 1,296 | 1,940 | 9.4 | 0 | 1 | 1 |
| DA | 751 | 973 | 1,724 | 8.4 | 0 | 1 | 1 |
| Independent | 1,618 | – | 1,618 | 7.9 | 1 | – | 1 |
| UDM | 26 | 142 | 168 | 0.8 | 0 | 0 | 0 |
| Total | 10,444 | 10,095 | 20,539 | 100.0 | 5 | 5 | 10 |
| Spoilt votes | 218 | 328 | 546 | | | | |
