= Steytlerville =

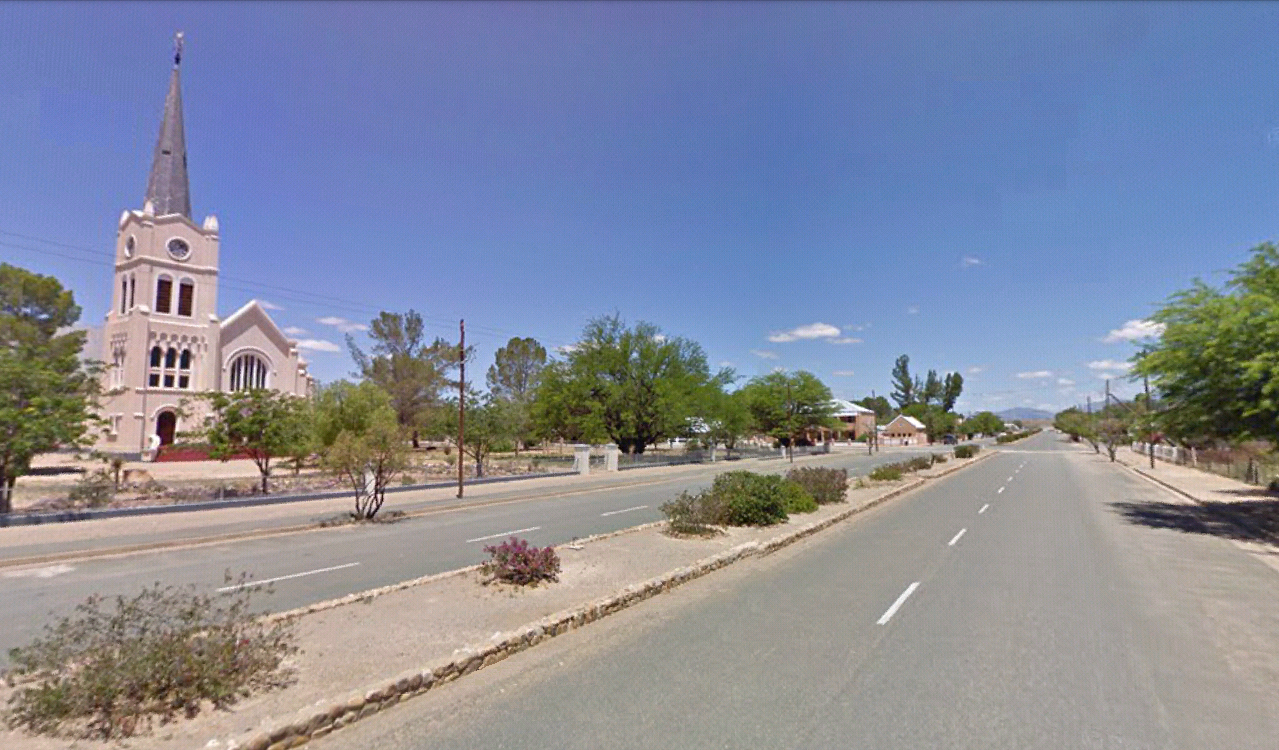
- Steytlerville seen from Sarel Cilliers Street

- Location within Eastern Cape Location within South Africa
- Coordinates: 33°20′S 24°20′E
- Country: South Africa
- Province: Eastern Cape
- District: Sarah Baartman
- Municipality: Dr Beyers Naudé

Area
  - Total: 24.7 km^{2} (9.5 sq mi)

Population (2011)
  - Total: 4,017
  - Density: 163/km^{2} (421/sq mi)

Racial makeup (2011)
  - Black African: 22.8%
  - Coloured: 71.1%
  - Indian/Asian: 0.2%
  - White: 5.3%
  - Other: 0.7%

First languages (2011)
  - Afrikaans: 80.1%
  - Xhosa: 17.1%
  - English: 1.4%
  - Other: 1.4%
- Time zone: UTC+2 (SAST)
- Postal code (street): 6250
- PO box: 6250
- Area code: 049

Steytlerville is a settlement on the R329 route in Sarah Baartman District Municipality in the Eastern Cape province of South Africa. The town is situated on the right bank of the Groot River, where the river emerges from a valley in the Grootrivierberge at Noorspoort. It is 164 km north-west of Port Elizabeth and 90 km east of Willowmore. It was founded in 1876 on the farm Noorspoort and attained municipal status in 1891. It is named after Reverend Abraham Isaac Steytler (1840–1922), a minister of the Dutch Reformed Church and Moderator of the Cape synod from 1909 to 1915.
