= Baviaans Local Municipality =

Baviaans
- Former local municipality
- Seal

- Location in the Eastern Cape
- Coordinates: 33°18′S 23°29′E
- Country: South Africa
- Province: Eastern Cape
- District: Sarah Baartman
- Seat: Willowmore
- Wards: 4

Government
  - Type: Municipal council
  - Mayor: Ewald Lock (DA)

Area
  - Total: 11,668 km^{2} (4,505 sq mi)

Population (2011)
  - Total: 17,761
  - Density: 1.5222/km^{2} (3.9425/sq mi)

Racial makeup (2011)
  - Black African: 12.0%
  - Coloured: 80.3%
  - Indian/Asian: 0.2%
  - White: 7.0%

First languages (2011)
  - Afrikaans: 91.2%
  - Xhosa: 5.8%
  - English: 1.7%
  - Other: 1.3%
- Time zone: UTC+2 (SAST)
- Municipal code: EC107

Baviaans Local Municipality was an administrative area in the Sarah Baartman District of the Eastern Cape in South Africa. After the municipal elections on 3 August 2016 it was merged into the larger Dr Beyers Naudé Local Municipality.

The municipality was named after the Baviaanskloof. The name is of Dutch origin and means "baboons ravine".

== Main places ==
The 2001 census divided the municipality into the following main places:

Place	Code	Area (km^{2})	Population	Most spoken language
Steytlerville	20702	22.03	713	Afrikaans
Vuyolwetho	20703	2.58	2,912	Afrikaans
Willowmore	20704	20.24	6,398	Afrikaans
Remainder of the municipality	20701	7,679.23	5,312	Afrikaans

== Politics ==
The municipal council consisted of seven members elected by mixed-member proportional representation. Four councillors were elected by first-past-the-post voting in four wards, while the remaining three were chosen from party lists so that the total number of party representatives was proportional to the number of votes received.

In the 2009 South African general election the Democratic Alliance won a plurality of 45.77% (2,290 votes), while the African National Congress received only 44.73% (2,238 vote). Other minor parties included COPE with 4.72% (236 votes) and the Independent Democrats with 2.12% (106 votes)

In the election of 18 May 2011 the Democratic Alliance (DA) won a majority of four seats on the council. The following table shows the results of the election.

Party	Votes				Seats		
Party	Ward	List	Total	%	Ward	List	Total
DA	3,644	3,629	7,273	55.4	3	1	4
ANC	2,922	2,940	5,862	44.6	1	2	3
Total	6,566	6,569	13,135	100.0	4	3	7
Spoilt votes	83	86	169				
