= Camdeboo Local Municipality =

Coordinates: 32°15′20″S 24°32′26″E

Camdeboo
- Former local municipality
- Seal

- Location in the Eastern Cape
- Country: South Africa
- Province: Eastern Cape
- District: Sarah Baartman
- Seat: Graaff-Reinet
- Wards: 7

Government
  - Type: Municipal council
  - Mayor: Hanna Makoba

Area
  - Total: 12,422 km^{2} (4,796 sq mi)

Population (2011)
  - Total: 50,993
  - Density: 4.1051/km^{2} (10.632/sq mi)

Racial makeup (2011)
  - Black African: 24.8%
  - Coloured: 64.8%
  - Indian/Asian: 0.4%
  - White: 9.6%

First languages (2011)
  - Afrikaans: 78.7%
  - Xhosa: 15.7%
  - English: 3.8%
  - Other: 1.8%
- Time zone: UTC+2 (SAST)
- Municipal code: EC101

Camdeboo Local Municipality was a local municipality in the Sarah Baartman District Municipality of the Eastern Cape in South Africa. After municipal elections on 3 August 2016 it was merged into the larger Dr Beyers Naudé Local Municipality.

The name Camdeboo (or Qamdobowa in Xhosa language) has evolved from a phonetically similar Khoi word meaning "green hollow".

== Main places ==
The 2011 census divided the municipality into the following main places:

Place	Code	Population	Most spoken language
Aberdeen	261005	5,133	Afrikaans
Graaff-Reinet	261003	26,585	Afrikaans
Kendrew	261007	57	Afrikaans
Nieu-Bethesda	261001	1,540	Afrikaans
Thembalesizwe	261006	2,029	Xhosa
uMasizakhe	261004	9,087	Xhosa
Remainder of the municipality	261002	6,562	Afrikaans

== Politics ==
The municipal council consisted of fourteen members elected by mixed-member proportional representation. Seven councillors were elected by first-past-the-post voting in seven wards, while the remaining seven were chosen from party lists so that the total number of party representatives was proportional to the number of votes received. In the election of 18 May 2011 the African National Congress (ANC) won a majority of eight seats on the council. The following table shows the results of the election.

Party	Ward			List			Total seats
Party	Votes	%	Seats	Votes	%	Seats	Total seats
African National Congress	7,382	55.09	4	7,493	55.91	4	8
Democratic Alliance	5,586	41.69	3	5,634	42.04	3	6
Independent Ratepayers Association of SA	174	1.30	0	89	0.66	0	0
Freedom Front Plus	136	1.02	0	95	0.71	0	0
Pan Africanist Congress of Azania	121	0.90	0	90	0.67	0	0
Total	13,399	100.00	7	13,401	100.00	7	14
Valid votes	13,399	98.86		13,401	98.94		
Invalid/blank votes	155	1.14		144	1.06		
Total votes	13,554	100.00		13,545	100.00		
Registered voters/turnout	23,164	58.51		23,164	58.47		
