= Dr Beyers Naudé Local Municipality =

Dr Beyers Naudé
- Local municipality
- Location of the municipality within the Eastern Cape
- Coordinates: 32.248°S 24.535°E
- Country: South Africa
- Province: Eastern Cape
- District: Sarah Baartman
- Seat: Graaff-Reinet
- Wards: 14

Government
  - Type: Municipal council

Area
  - Total: 28,653 km^{2} (11,063 sq mi)

Population (2011)
  - Total: 79,291
  - Density: 2.7673/km^{2} (7.1672/sq mi)

Racial makeup (2011)
  - Black African: 23.6%
  - Coloured: 66.9%
  - Indian/Asian: 0.4%
  - White: 8.7%

First languages (2011)
  - Afrikaans: 80.3%
  - Xhosa: 14.8%
  - English: 3.2%
  - Other: 1.7%
- Time zone: UTC+2 (SAST)
- Municipal code: EC101

Dr Beyers Naudé Municipality (Afrikaans: Dr Beyers Naudé Munisipaliteit; Xhosa: uMasipala wase Dr Beyers Naudé) is a local municipality within the Sarah Baartman District Municipality, in the Eastern Cape of South Africa. The municipality was established by merging the Camdeboo, Ikwezi and Baviaans local municipalities. The decision to merge the municipalities was taken by the Municipal Demarcation Board in 2015 but only took effect after municipal elections on 3 August 2016. The new municipality is named after the Afrikaner cleric and anti-apartheid activist Beyers Naudé. Its seat is in Graaff-Reinet. The merger was motivated by political interests because the ruling party, the African National Congress, was losing support in the area. One of the municipalities, Baviaans, was already governed by the opposition Democratic Alliance.

== Geography and people ==
The new municipality covers an area of 28,653 square kilometres (11,063 sq mi) at the western end of the Eastern Cape province, from the Sneeuberge in the north to the Baviaanskloof in the south. It is a sparsely populated area, with a population of 79,291 giving a density of only 2.8 inhabitants per square kilometre (7.3/sq mi).

80.3% of residents of the municipality speak Afrikaans as their home language, while 14.8% speak Xhosa and 3.2% speak English. 66.9% described themselves as "Coloured", 23.6% as "Black African", and 8.7% as "White".

The principal town in the municipal area is Graaff-Reinet, with a population of approximately 35,000. Other towns include Willowmore, Aberdeen, Jansenville, Steytlerville and Klipplaat.

== Government and politics ==
The municipal council consists of 24 members elected by mixed-member proportional representation. 12 councillors are elected by first-past-the-post voting in 12 wards, while the remaining 12 are chosen from party lists so that the total number of party representatives is proportional to the number of votes received.

In the election of 4 November 2026 no party won a majority. The Democratic Alliance (DA) won the largest number of seats on the council.

The following table shows the results of the election.

Party	Ward			List			Total seats
Party	Votes	%	Seats	Votes	%	Seats	Total seats
Democratic Alliance	8,904	40.06	6	8,883	40.17	4	10
African National Congress	8,007	36.03	4	8,131	36.77	5	9
Patriotic Alliance	3,341	15.03	2	3,415	15.44	2	4
Freedom Front Plus	616	2.77	0	699	3.16	1	1
Independent candidates	330	1.48	0				0
7 other parties	1,026	4.62	0	984	4.45	0	0
Total	22,224	100.00	12	22,112	100.00	12	24
Valid votes	22,224	98.53		22,112	98.41		
Invalid/blank votes	332	1.47		357	1.59		
Total votes	22,556	100.00		22,469	100.00		
Registered voters/turnout	43,196	52.22		43,196	52.02		
