= Ikwezi Local Municipality =

Coordinates: 32°56′S 24°40′E

Ikwezi
- Former local municipality
- Seal

- Location in the Eastern Cape
- Country: South Africa
- Province: Eastern Cape
- District: Sarah Baartman
- Seat: Jansenville
- Wards: 4

Government
  - Type: Municipal council
  - Mayor: Sizwe Alfred Mngwevu

Area
  - Total: 4,563 km^{2} (1,762 sq mi)

Population (2011)
  - Total: 10,537
  - Density: 2.309/km^{2} (5.981/sq mi)

Racial makeup (2011)
  - Black African: 37.2%
  - Coloured: 54.6%
  - Indian/Asian: 0.2%
  - White: 7.6%

First languages (2011)
  - Afrikaans: 69.6%
  - Xhosa: 25.8%
  - English: 2.6%
  - Other: 2%
- Time zone: UTC+2 (SAST)
- Municipal code: EC103

Ikwezi Local Municipality was a local municipality in the Sarah Baartman District Municipality of the Eastern Cape in South Africa. Ikwezi is an isiXhosa name that means "morning star". After municipal elections on 3 August 2016 it was merged into the larger Dr Beyers Naudé Local Municipality.

== Main places ==
The 2001 census divided the municipality into the following main places:

Place	Code	Area (km^{2})	Population	Most spoken language
Jansenville	20302	23.83	1,433	Afrikaans
Klipplaat	20303	2.19	1,257	Afrikaans
KwaZamukucinga	20304	1.18	3,477	Xhosa
Wongalethu	20305	1.62	1,640	Afrikaans
Remainder of the municipality	20301	4,420.87	2,558	Afrikaans

== Politics ==
The municipal council consisted of seven members elected by mixed-member proportional representation. Four councillors were elected by first-past-the-post voting in four wards, while the remaining three were chosen from party lists so that the total number of party representatives was proportional to the number of votes received. In the election of 18 May 2011 the African National Congress (ANC) won a majority of five seats on the council. The following table shows the results of the election.

Party	Ward			List			Total seats
Party	Votes	%	Seats	Votes	%	Seats	Total seats
African National Congress	2,346	65.94	4	2,356	66.05	1	5
Democratic Alliance	1,044	29.34	0	1,211	33.95	2	2
Independent candidates	168	4.72	0				0
Total	3,558	100.00	4	3,567	100.00	3	7
Valid votes	3,558	98.29		3,567	98.32		
Invalid/blank votes	62	1.71		61	1.68		
Total votes	3,620	100.00		3,628	100.00		
Registered voters/turnout	5,729	63.19		5,729	63.33		
