= List of hospitals in South Africa =

This is a list of hospitals in South Africa.

== Eastern Cape ==
Below is the list of hospitals in the province of Eastern Cape:

Buffalo City

- Cecilia Makiwane Hospital (Mdantsane)
- Duncan Village Day Hospital
- Fort Grey TB Hospital
- Frere Hospital
- Life Beacon Bay Hospital
- Life East London Private Hospital
- Life St Dominic’s Hospital
- Life St James Hospital
- Life St Marks Clinic
- Nkqubela Chest Hospital (Mdantsane)

Gqeberha

- Nurture Aurora Rehabilitation Hospital (Private)
- Dora Nginza Hospital
- Elizabeth Donkin Hospital
- Empilweni Hospital
- Jose Pearson TB Hospital
- Life Hunterscraig Private Hospital
- Life Mercantile Private Hospital
- Life St George’s Hospital
- Livingstone Hospital
- Netcare Greenacres Hospital
- Nightingale Subacute Hospital
- Oasim Private Hospital
- Port Elizabeth Provincial Hospital
- Westways Private Hospital

Matatiele

- Taylor Bequest Memorial Hospital
- Matatiele Private Hospital

Mthatha

- Zamakuhle Private Hospital
- Bedford Orthopedic Hospital
- Life St Mary’s Private Hospital
- Mthatha General Hospital
- Nelson Mandela Academic Hospital
- Sir Henry Eliot Hospital

Bizana

- Greenville Hospital (Bizana)
- St Patrick's Hospital (Bizana)

Other

- Aberdeen Hospital
- Adelaide Hospital
- Aliwal North Hospital
- All Saints Hospital (Ngcobo)
- Andries Vosloo Hospital (Somerset East)
- B.J. Vorster Hospital (Kareedouw)
- Bambisana Hospital (Lusikisiki)
- Bedford Hospital
- Bhisho Provincial Hospital
- Burgersdorp Provincial Hospital
- Butterworth Hospital
- Cala Provincial Hospital
- Canzibe Hospital
- Cathcart Provincial Hospital
- Cloete Joubert Hospital (Barkly East)
- Cofimvaba Hospital
- Cradock Provincial Hospital
- Netcare Cuyler Hospital (Uitenhage)
- Dordrecht Hospital
- Dr Maliso Mphele Hospital (Tsolo)
- Elliot Provincial Hospital
- Empilisweni District Hospital (Sterkspruit)
- Fort Beaufort Hospital
- Fort England Psychiatric Hospital (Grahamstown)
- Frontier Hospital (Queenstown)
- Glen Grey Provincial Hospital (Lady Frere)
- Grey Provincial Hospital (Qonce)
- Grey Monument Private Clinic (Qonce)
- Hewu Hospital (Whittlesea)
- Holy Cross Hospital (Flagstaff)
- Humansdorp Hospital
- Indwe Hospital
- Isilimela Hospital (Port St Johns)
- Jamestown Hospital
- Komani Psychiatric Hospital (Queenstown)
- Komga Hospital
- Lady Grey Hospital
- Life Isivivana Private Hospital (Humansdorp)
- Life Queenstown Private Hospital
- Maclear Hospital
- Madwaleni Hospital
- Madzikane KaZulu Hospital (Mt. Frere)
- Margery Parkes TB Hospital (Graaff-Reinet)
- Martje Venter Hospital (Tarkastad)
- Mary Therese Hospital (Mt. Frere)
- Midlands Provincial Hospital (Graaff-Reinet)
- Mjanyana Hospital (Ngcobo)
- Molteno Hospital
- Mount Ayliff Hospital
- Nessie Knight Hospital (Qumbu)
- Nompumelelo Hospital (Peddie)
- Port Alfred Hospital
- P.Z. Meyer Hospital (Humansdorp)
- Rietvlei Hospital (Umzimkhulu)
- Settlers Hospital (Grahamstown)
- S.S. Gida Hospital (Keiskamma Hoek)
- St Barnabas Hospital (Libode)
- St Elizabeth Mission Hospital (Lusikisiki)
- St Francis Chronic Hospital (Aliwal North)
- St Lucy's Hospital (Tsolo)
- Sterkstroom Provincial Hospital
- Steynsburg Provincial Hospital
- Stutterheim Provincial Hospital
- Tafalofefe Hospital (near Butterworth)
- Tower Psychiatric Hospital (Fort Beaufort)
- Uitenhage Provincial Hospital
- Umlamli Hospital (via Sterkspruit)
- Victoria Hospital (Alice)
- Wilhelm Stahl Provincial Hospital (Middelburg, Eastern Cape)
- Willowmore Hospital
- Zithulele Hospital

== Free State ==
Below is the list of hospitals in the province of Free State:

Bloemfontein

- Bloemcare Psychiatric Clinic / Hospital (Private)
- Nurture Hillandale Rehabilitation Hospital (Private)
- Nurture Woodlands Psychiatric Hospital (Private)
- Mediclinic Bloemfontein (Private)
- Life Pasteur Hospital (Private)
- Life Rosepark Hospital (Private)
- Netcare Pelonomi Regional Hospital (Private/public partnership)
- Pelonomi Hospital (Public)(Private/public partnership)
- Netcare Universitas Hospital (Private/public partnership)
- Universitas Academic Hospital (Public)
- Free State Psychiatric Complex Bloemfontein (Previously Orange Hospital) (Public)
- National District Hospital (Public)

Botshabelo

- Botshabelo District Hospital
- Busamed (Private)
- Emoya Med (Private)

Phuthaditjhaba

- Mofumahadi Manapo Regional Hospital (Public)
- Elizabeth Ross district Hospital (Private)

Welkom

- Bongani Regional Hospital (Public)
- RH Mathjebeng Hospital (formally Ernest Oppenheimer Hospital) (Semi-Private)
- Goudveld Regional Hospital
- Mediclinic Welkom (Private) (previously Hydromed Hospital)
- ~~St Helena Hospital (Private) Permanently Closed~~

Virginia

- Katleho Provincial Hospital (previously Virginia Provincial Hospital)

Kroonstad

- Kroon Hospital (Private)
- Boitumelo Hospital (Public)

Bethlehem

- Phekolong hospital
- Dihlabeng hospital
- Nurture Corona Physical Rehabilitation Hospital (Private)
- Medi-Clinic-Hoogland
- Bethlehem Medical centre

Other

- Mafube Hospital (Frankfort)
- Mediclinic Hoogland (Bethlehem)
- Metsimaholo Hospital (Sasolburg)
- Nala District Hospital (Bothaville)
- Parys Hospital (Parys)
- Sasolburg Provincial Hospital (Sasolburg)
- Stoffel Coetzee Provincial Hospital (Smithfield)
- Tokollo Hospital (Heilbron)
- Thebe hospital (Harrismith)
- BusaMed (Harrismith)
- Albert Nzula Hospital (Trompsburg)

== Gauteng ==
Below is a list of hospitals in the province of Gauteng:

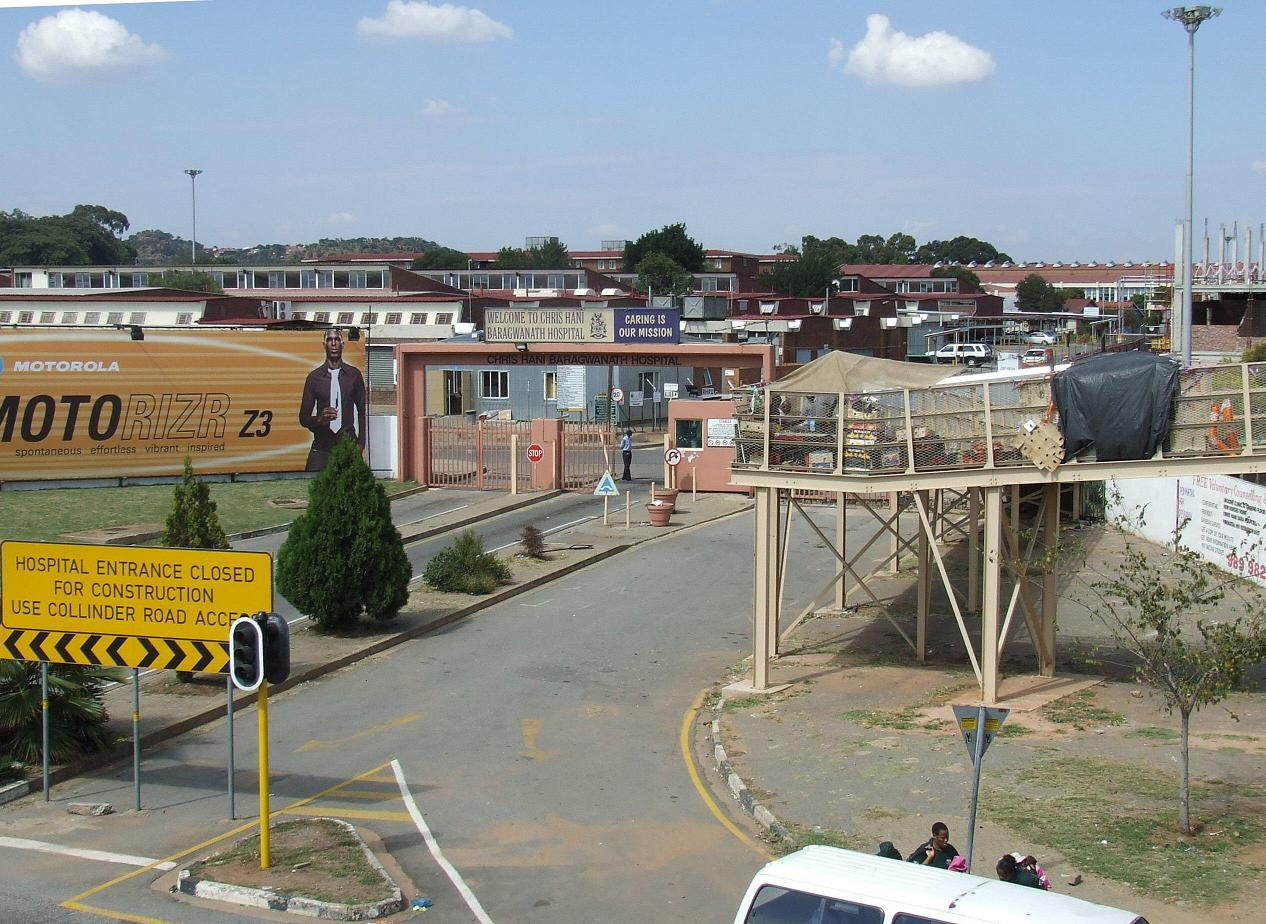
Entrance to the Chris Hani Baragwanath Hospital in 2007. Construction work referred to on the yellow notice has been completed and the entrance is once again open.

Akasia

- Netcare Akasia Hospital

Alberton

- Akeso Alberton Psychiatric Hospital
- Netcare Alberton Hospital

Benoni

- Life The Glynnwood
- Netcare Lakeview Hospital
- Netcare Linmed Hospital

Boksburg

- Sunshine Hospital
- Netcare Sunward Park Hospital
- Tambo Memorial Hospital (Formerly Boksburg Benoni Hospital)

Brakpan

- Life Dalview Hospital

Centurion

- Mediclinic Midstream
- Netcare Unitas Hospital
- Raslouw Private Hospital

Edenvale

- Edenvale Day Hospital
- Edenvale Regional Hospital

Germiston

- Bertha Gxowa Hospital, Germiston South
- Life Bedford Gardens Hospital, Bedfordview
- Life Roseacres Hospital, Primrose

Johannesburg

- Abey K Medical Centre
- Akeso Parktown Psychiatric Hospital
- Charlotte Maxeke Johannesburg Academic Hospital
- Conner Stone Hospital
- Denver Hospital
- Gateway House Psychiatric Residence
- Helen Joseph Hospital
- Leratong Hospital
- Marymount Hospital
- Nelson Mandela Children's Hospital
- Netcare Bagleyston Hospital
- Netcare Garden City Hospital
- Netcare Linksfield Hospital
- Netcare Milpark Hospital
- Netcare Mulbarton Hospital
- Netcare Park Lane Hospital
- Netcare Rand Hospital
- Netcare Rehabilitation Hospital
- Netcare Rosebank Hospital
- Netcare Rosewood Day Hospital
- Rahima Moosa Mother and Child Hospital
- South Rand Hospital
- Wits University Donald Gordon Medical Centre

Kempton Park

- Arwyp Medical Centre

Krugersdorp

- Netcare Pinehaven Hospital
- Netcare Krugersdorp Hospital
- Leratong Hospital

Mamelodi

- Mamelodi Hospital

Midrand

- Life Carstenhof Hospital
- Life Blue Cross Hospital
- Netcare Waterfall Hospital (in partnership with Phelang Benolo)

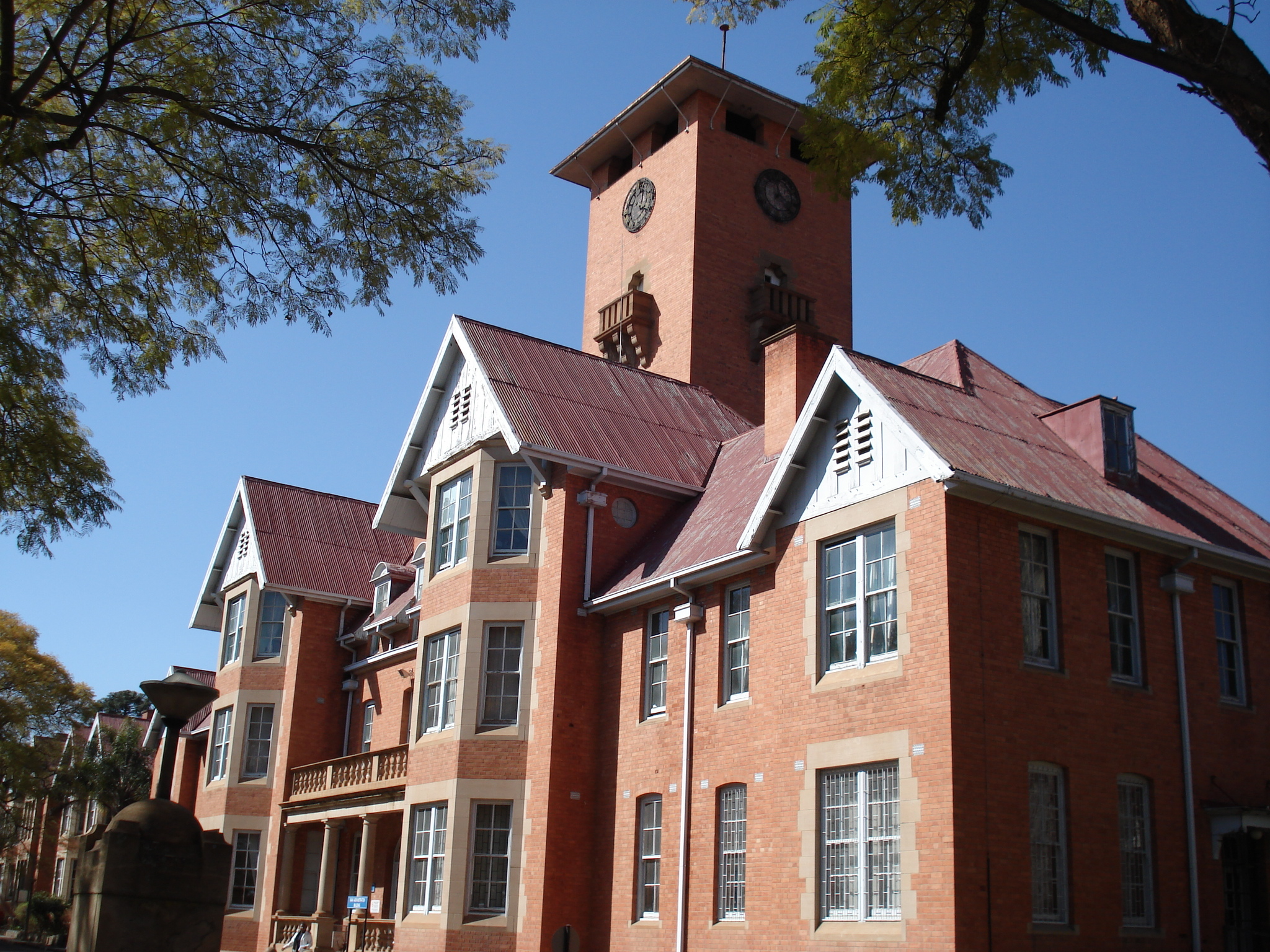
The Weskoppies Hospital in Pretoria.

Pretoria

- Denmar Psychiatric Hospital
- Dr George Mukhari Hospital
- Eugene Marais Hospital
- Faerie Glen Hospital
- Jacaranda Hospital
- Jubilee Hospital
- Kalafong Hospital
- Little Company of Mary Hospital
- Louis Pasteur Hospital
- Mediclinic Gynaecological Hospital
- Mediclinic Kloof
- Mediclinic Heart Hospital
- Mediclinic Medforum
- Mediclinic Muelmed
- Moot General Hospital
- Netcare Montana Hospital
- Odi Hospital
- Pretoria East Private Hospital
- Pretoria Eye Institute
- Pretoria Urology Hospital
- Pretoria West Hospital
- Steve Biko Hospital
- Tropicana Hospital
- Tshwane District Hospital
- Vista Psychiatric Hospital
- Weskoppies Psychiatric Hospital
- Wilgers Hospital
- Zuid-Afrikaans Hospital

Randburg

- Akeso Randburg – Crescent Clinic
- Netcare Olivedale Hospital

Roodepoort

- Life Flora Hospital
- Life Wilgeheuwel Hospital

Sandton

- Mediclinic Morningside
- Mediclinic Sandton
- Netcare Sandton Hospital
- Netcare Sunninghill Hospital
- Tara Psychiatric Hospital
- Witkoppen Clinic

Soweto

- Chris Hani Baragwanath Hospital

Springs

- Netcare N17 Hospital
- Far East Rand Hospital
- Springs Parkland Clinic

Tembisa

- Tembisa Hospital

Vereeniging

- Kopanong Hospital
- Mediclinic Vereeniging
- Midvaal Hospitaal
- Sebokeng Hospital

Other

- Botshelong Empilweni Private Hospital (Vosloorus)
- Busamed Modderfontein Private Hospital (Modderfontein)
- Lenmed Ahmed Kathrada Private Hospital (Lenasia)
- Mediclinic Emfuleni (Vanderbijlpark)
- Natalspruit Hospital (Katlehong)
- Pholosong Hospital (Tsakane)
- Robinson Hospital (Randfontein)

== KwaZulu-Natal ==
Source: Below is the list of hospitals in the province of KwaZulu Natal:

eThekwini

=== Amanzimtoti ===
- Netcare Kingsway Hospital

=== Cato Ridge ===
- Hibiscus Hospital Cato Ridge

=== Chatsworth ===
- Life Chatsmed Garden Hospital
- RK Khan Hospital

=== Durban ===
- Addington Hospital
- Ahmed Al Kadi Private Hospital
- Clairwood Hospital, Mobeni
- JMH City Hospital
- JMH Ascot Park Hospital
- JMH Durdoc Hospital
- Durban Haematology Hospital
- Inkosi Albert Luthuli Central Hospital
- King George V Hospital
- Life Entabeni Hospital
- McCord Hospital
- Netcare Parklands Hospital
- Netcare St Augustine's Hospital
- Victoria Mxenge Hospital, formerly King Edward VIII Hospital (renamed May 2024)
- Wentworth Hospital

=== Hillcrest ===
- Busamed Hillcrest Private Hospital

=== Iqadi ===
- Osindisweni Mission Hospital

=== Isipingo ===
- JMH Isipingo Hospital

=== Mount Edgecombe ===
- Life Mount Edgecombe Hospital

=== oThongathi ===
- Mediclinic Victoria

=== Phoenix ===
- Mahatma Gandhi Memorial Hospital

=== Pinetown ===
- Life The Crompton Hospital
- St Mary's Hospital

=== uMhlanga ===
- Akeso Umhlanga Psychiatric Hospital
- Busamed Gateway Private Hospital
- Netcare uMhlanga Hospital
- Nurture Umhlanga Psychiatric Hospital (Private)

=== uMlazi ===
- Prince Mshiyeni Hospital

=== Westville ===
- Life Westville Hospital

Umgungundlovu (Midlands)

=== Edendale ===
- Eden Gardens Private Hospital
- Harry Gwala Regional Hospital

=== Hilton ===
- Life Hilton Private Hospital

=== Howick ===
- Lenmed Howick Private Hospital

=== Northdale ===
- Northdale Hospital

=== Pietermaritzburg ===
- Akeso Pietermaritzburg Psychiatric Hospital
- Fort Napier Hospital (Forensic Psychiatric)
- Grey's Hospital
- Mediclinic Pietermaritzburg
- Midlands Specialist Private Hospital
- Netcare St Anne's Hospital
- Town Hill Hospital

=== Richmond ===
- Richmond Hospital (specialising in TB)

Newcastle

- Mediclinic Newcastle Hospital
- Newcastle Provincial Hospital
- Madadeni Provincial Hospital

Harry Gwala (Southern Drakensberg)

=== Creighton ===
- St Apollinaris Hospital

=== Ixopo ===
- Christ the King Hospital

=== Kokstad ===
- Netcare Kokstad Private Hospital
- East Griqualand & Usher Memorial Hospital

=== Umzimkhulu ===
- Umzimkhulu Hospital

iLembe (North Coast)

=== Ballito ===
- Netcare Alberlito Hospital

=== KwaDukuza ===
- General Justice Gizenga Mpanza Regional Hospital
- KwaDukuza Private Hospital

King Cetshwayo

=== Empangeni ===
- Queen Nandi Hospital
- Ngwelezane Hospital
- Garden Clinic Private Hospital
- Mosvold (Ingwavuma)
- Nkonjeni (Mahlabathini)
- Benedictine (Nongoma)
- Eshowe Hospital

=== Richards Bay ===
- Melomed Richards Bay Private Hospital
- Netcare The Bay Hospital

Ugu (South Coast)

=== Harding ===
- St Andrews Hospital

=== Hibberdene ===
- Dunstan Farell TB Hospital

=== Margate ===
- Netcare Margate Hospital

=== Murchison ===
- Murchison District Hospital

=== Port Shepstone ===
- Hibiscus Hospital Port Shepstone
- Port Shepstone Regional Hospital

=== Scottburgh ===
- Hibiscus Hospital Scottburgh
- G.J. Crookes Hospital

=== Shelly Beach ===
- Shelly Beach Hospital

Other

- Bethesda Hospital (Jozini)
- Charles Johnson Memorial Hospital (Nquthu)
- Church of Scotland Hospital (Tugela Ferry)
- Dundee Hospital
- Ekombe Hospital
- Eshowe Hospital
- Estcourt Hospital
- Greytown Hospital
- Hlabisa Hospital (Hlabisa)
- Ladysmith Hospital
- Manguzi Hospital (Kwangwanase)
- Mosvold Hospital (Ingwavuma)
- Mseleni Hospital
- Vryheid Hospital

== Limpopo ==
Below is a list of hospitals in the province of Limpopo:

Polokwane

- Mediclinic Limpopo
- Netcare Pholoso Hospital
- Polokwane Hospital
- Kgosi George Masebe Hospital
- Kgosi Mampuru Hospital

Other

- Botlokwa Hospital
- Curamed Thabazimbi Hospital
- Dilokong Hospital
- Donald Fraser Hospital (Vhufulwi)
- Dr CN Phatudi Hospital
- Duiwelskloof Hospital
- Elim Hospital
- Ellisras Hospital
- Evuxakeni Hospital
- FH Odendaal Hospital
- George Masebe Hospital
- Groblersdal Hospital
- Hayani Hospital
- Helene Franz hospital
- Jane Furse Hospital
- Kgapane Hospital
- Lebowakgomo Hospital
- Letaba Hospital
- Louis Trichard Hospital
- Malamulele Hospital
- Mankweng Hospital
- Maphutha L Malatji Hospital
- Matlala Hospital (Marblehall)
- Marapong Medi-Clinic
- Mecklenburg Hospital
- Messina Hospital
- Mokopane Hospital
- Nkhensani Hospital
- Philadelphia Hospital
- Sekororo Hospital
- Seshego Hospital
- Shiluvana Hospital
- Siloam Hospital
- St Rita's Hospital
- Thabamoopo Hospital
- Thabazimbi Hospital
- Tshilidzini Hospital
- Tzaneen Private Hospital
- Van Velden Hospital
- Voortrekker Hospital
- Warmbad Hospital
- WF Knobel Hospital
- Witpoort Hospital
- Zebediela Hospital
- Zoutpansberg Private Hospital

== Mpumalanga ==
Below is the list of hospitals in the province of Mpumalanga:

Mbombela (Nelspruit)

- Busamed Lowveld Private Hospital
- Mediclinic Nelspruit
- Rob Ferreira Provincial Hospital
- Kiaat Private Hospital

eMalahleni (Witbank)

- Life Cosmos Hospital
- Witbank Provincial Hospital

Other

- Barberton Hospital
- Delmas Hospital
- Embhuleni Hospital
- Ermelo Provincial Hospital
- Kwa-Mhlanga Hospital
- Mapulaneng Hospital
- Matikwana Hospital (Mkhuhlu)
- Mediclinic Barberton
- Mediclinic Ermelo
- Mediclinic Highveld (Trichardt)
- Mediclinic Secunda
- Middelburg Provincial Hospital
- Midmed Hospital (Middelburg)
- Mmametlhake Hospital
- Piet Retief Hospital
- Seboche Hospital
- Shongwe Hospital
- Themba Provincial Hospital
- Tintswalo Hospital
- Tonga Hospital

== Northern Cape ==
Below is the list of hospitals in the province of Northern Cape:

Kimberley

- Kimberley Hospital Complex
- Mediclinic Kimberley

Other

- Abraham Esau Hospital (Calvinia)
- Barkly West Hospital
- Carnarvon Hospital (Carnarvon)
- Mediclinic Kathu
- Tshwaragano Community Hospital
- Kuruman District Hospital
- Upington Medi-Clinic
- Gordonia Hospital (Upington)
- B J Kempen Memorial Hospital (Victoria West)
- Dr Harry Surtie Hospital (Upington)

== North West ==
Below is the list of hospitals in the province of North West:

Klerksdorp

- Anncron Clinic
- Klerksdorp Provincial Hospital
- Sunningdale Private Hospital
- Wilmed Private Hospital

Other

- Duff Scott Hospital (Mine Hospital), (Stilfontein)
- Ferncrest Private Hospital (Thlabane)
- Fochville Private Hospital
- Legae Private Clinic (Mabopane)
- Leslie Williams Private Hospital (Carletonville)
- Mediclinic Brits (Brits)
- Mediclinic Potchefstroom (Potchefstroom)
- Moses Kotane Hospital (Ledig)
- Potchefstroom Provincial Hospital
- Peglerae Private Hospital (Rustenburg)
- MEDCARE- (Rustenburg)
- Mahikeng Provincial Hospital
- Victoria Private Hospital (Mafikeng)
- Vryburg Private Hospital
- Western Deep Levels Hospital (Carletonville)
- Westvaal Hospital (Mine Hospital), (Orkney)

== Western Cape ==
Source: Below is the list of hospitals in the province of Western Cape:

=== Cape Metropole ===
==== Athlone ====
- GF Jooste Hospital
- Melomed Gatesville

==== Bellville ====
- Cape Eye Hospital
- Karl Bremer Hospital
- Mediclinic Louis Leipoldt
- Melomed Bellville
- Stikland Psychiatric Hospital

==== Blouberg ====
- Netcare Blaauwberg Hospital

==== Brackenfell ====
- Mediclinic Cape Gate

==== Cape Town ====
- Alexandra Hospital
- Akeso Kenilworth Psychiatric Hospital
- Akeso Montrose Manor Psychiatric Hospital
- DP Marais Hospital
- Groote Schuur Hospital
- Life Kingsbury Hospital
- Life Peninsula Eye Hospital
- Maitland Cottage Home
- Mediclinic Cape Town
- Mediclinic Constantiaberg
- Melomed Claremont
- Melomed Tokai
- Mowbray Active Birth Unit
- Netcare Christiaan Barnard Memorial Hospital
- Nurture Newlands Physical Rehabilitation Hospital
- Red Cross War Memorial Children's Hospital
- Rondebosch Medical Centre
- Somerset Hospital
- Southern Cross Hospital
- Valkenberg Psychiatric Hospital
- Victoria Hospital
- Vincent Pallotti Hospital

==== Durbanville ====
- Mediclinic Durbanville

==== Eersterivier ====
- Eerste River Hospital

==== Fish Hoek ====
- False Bay Hospital

==== Goodwood ====
- Netcare N1 City
- Nurture Cape View Physical Rehabilitation Hospital

==== Hout Bay ====
- Nurture Harmony Recovery and Wellness Facility

==== Khayelitsha ====
- Khayelitsha Hospital

==== Kommetjie ====
- Akeso Stepping Stones Psychiatric Hospital

==== Kuilsrivier ====
- Netcare Kuils River

==== Mitchells Plain ====
- Lentegeur Psychiatric Hospital
- Melomed Mitchells Plain

==== Milnerton ====
- Brooklyn Chest Hospital
- Akeso Milnerton Psychiatric Hospital
- Mediclinic Milnerton

==== Parow ====
- Mediclinic Panorama
- Tygerberg Hospital

==== Somerset West ====
- Busamed Paardevlei Private Hospital
- Helderberg Hospital
- Mediclinic Vergelegen

==== Strand ====
- Mediclinic Strand
- Spescare Helderberg Sub-Acute Hospital

George

- George Hospital
- Mediclinic George

Hermanus

- Hermanus Hospital
- Mediclinic Hermanus

Mossel Bay

- Life Bay View Hospital
- Mosselbaai Hospital

Knysna

- Knysna Hospital
- Knysna Private Hospital

Paarl

- Mediclinic Paarl
- Paarl Hospital
- Sonstraal TB Hospital
- Spescare Paarl Sub-Acute Hospital

Stellenbosch

- Mediclinic Stellenbosch
- Mediclinic Winelands (Day Clinic and Orthopaedic Hospital)
- Stellenbosch Hospital

Worcester

- Brewelskoof TB Hospital
- Eben Donges Hospital
- Mediclinic Worcester

Other

- Beaufort West Hospital
- Ceres Hospital
- Citrusdal Hospital
- Clanwilliam Hospital
- Lapa Munnik Hospital
- Mediclinic Klein Karoo (Oudtshoorn)
- Mediclinic Plettenberg Bay
- Montague Hospital
- Otto du Plessis Hospital
- Oudtshoorn Hospital
- Riversdale Hospital
- Robertson Hospital
- St Joseph's Home
- Swartland Hospital
- Swellendam Hospital
- Vredenburg Hospital
- Vredendal Hospital
- Wesfleur Hospital
