= Cala Provincial Hospital =

- Eastern Cape Department of Health

Geography
- Location: Cala, Chris Hani District Municipality, Eastern Cape, South Africa
- Coordinates: 31°31′33″S 27°41′56″E

Organisation
- Care system: Public
- Type: Community

Services
- Emergency department: Yes
- Beds: 92

Links
- Website: Eastern Cape Department of Health website - Chris Hani District Hospitals
- Other links: List of hospitals in South Africa

Cala Provincial Hospital is a Provincial government funded hospital for the Sakhisizwe Local Municipality area in Cala, Eastern Cape, in South Africa.

The hospital departments include Emergency department, Paediatric ward, Maternity ward, Gynaecology Services, Out Patients Department, Surgical Services, Medical Services, Operating Theatre & CSSD Services, Pharmacy, Anti-Retroviral (ARV) treatment for HIV/AIDS, Post Trauma Counseling Services, Physiotherapy, Occupational Services, Laboratory Services, X-ray Services, Laundry Services, Kitchen Services and Mortuary.
