= Elliot Provincial Hospital =

- Eastern Cape Department of Health

Geography
- Location: Elliot, Chris Hani District Municipality, Eastern Cape, South Africa
- Coordinates: 31°20′14″S 27°50′17″E

Organisation
- Care system: Public
- Type: Community

Services
- Emergency department: Yes
- Beds: 52

Links
- Website: Eastern Cape Department of Health website - Chris Hani District Hospitals
- Lists: Hospitals in South Africa
- Other links: List of hospitals in South Africa

Elliot Provincial Hospital is a provincial-government-funded rural general hospital for the Sakhisizwe Local Municipality area in Elliot, Eastern Cape in South Africa. It has 52 beds.

Its departments include Emergency, Paediatric, Maternity, Outpatients, Surgical Services, Medical Services, Operating Theatre & CSSD Services, Pharmacy, Anti-Retroviral (ARV) treatment for HIV/AIDS, Post Trauma Counseling Services, X-ray Services, Physiotherapy, NHLS Laboratory, Laundry Services, Kitchen Services and Mortuary.
