= Charles Maclay (anatomist) =

Scottish anatomist and surgeon

Charles Workman Maclay FRCS, FRCSED, FRFPSGLAS (4 November 1913 – 12 April 1978) was a Scottish anatomist and consultant surgeon.

== Early life ==
Maclay was born in Glasgow and educated at Glasgow Academy and Strathallan School, Perthshire. At the University of Glasgow he was awarded the Lorimer bursary in anatomy and physiology, the Macleod gold medal in surgery, and the Asher Asher gold medal in diseases of the ear, nose, and throat. Maclay graduated BSc in 1933, MB ChB in 1936, and became FRCS Edinburgh in 1940, FRCS England in 1941 and FRFPS Glasgow in 1943. In 1937, one year after graduation, he became senior demonstrator and lecturer in anatomy at King's College, University of London.

== Surgeon ==
At the outbreak of World War II in 1939, Maclay joined the Royal Army Medical Corps and served as a surgical specialist. On 18 December 1943, he was promoted to lieutenant. Maclay was one of those who took part in the Normandy landings on 6 June 1944. In 1947 he was demobilised with the permanent rank of major.

Maclay was appointed consultant surgeon to the Boston Combined Hospitals, Lincolnshire in 1948. Driven by an urge to help underprivileged people, he emigrated to South Africa in 1957, where he was senior surgeon at Butterworth, Port Elizabeth and Eshowe hospitals. He was proficient in French and German, had a knowledge of Italian and Afrikaans and over time developed an ability in certain African languages.

In 1964 Maclay became senior lecturer in anatomy at the Durban Medical School, University of Natal. He accepted the same position at the University of Cape Town in 1970, before returning to the University of Natal in 1974. Maclay evolved a series of diagrams for teaching gross anatomy, neuroanatomy, embryology and a masterpiece of concise instruction in applied anatomy.
