= Sterkstroom Provincial Hospital =

- Eastern Cape Department of Health

Geography
- Location: Sterkstroom, Enoch Mgijima Local Municipality, Eastern Cape, South Africa
- Coordinates: 32°10′02″S 25°37′21″E

Organisation
- Care system: Public
- Type: Community

Services
- Emergency department: Yes
- Beds: 8

Links
- Website: Eastern Cape Department of Health website - Chris Hani District Hospitals
- Lists: Hospitals in South Africa
- Other links: List of hospitals in South Africa

Sterkstroom Provincial Hospital is a Provincial government funded hospital for the Inkwanca Local Municipality area in Sterkstroom, Eastern Cape in South Africa.

The hospital departments include Emergency department, Paediatric ward, Maternity ward, Out Patients Department, Surgical Services, Medical Services, Operating Theatre & CSSD Services, Pharmacy, Anti-Retroviral (ARV) treatment for HIV/AIDS, Post Trauma Counseling Services, X-ray Services, Physiotherapy, NHLS Laboratory, Laundry Services, Kitchen Services and Mortuary.
