= Indwe Hospital =

- Eastern Cape Department of Health

Geography
- Location: Indwe, Eastern Cape, South Africa
- Coordinates: 31°28′00″S 27°20′12″E

Organisation
- Care system: Public
- Type: Community

Services
- Emergency department: Yes

Links
- Website: Indwe Hospital
- Other links: List of hospitals in South Africa

Indwe Hospital is a Provincial government funded hospital in Indwe in the Emalahleni Local Municipality, Eastern Cape area in South Africa.

The hospital departments include Emergency department, Out Patients Department, Paediatric ward, Maternity ward, Surgical Services, Medical Services, Operating Theatre & CSSD Services, Pharmacy, Anti-Retroviral (ARV) treatment for HIV/AIDS, Post Trauma Counseling Services, Laundry Services, Kitchen Services and Mortuary.
