= Benjamin Tyamzashe =

South African composer

Benjamin John Peter Tyamzashe
- Born: September 5, 1890; Kimberley, Cape Colony
- Died: June 4, 1978 (aged 87); Frere Hospital, East London, South Africa
- Spouse: Mercy Gladys Xiniwe
- Children: 6

Benjamin John Peter Tyamzashe (5 September 1890 - 4 June 1978) was a South African Xhosa music composer, teacher, principal, choir conductor and organist.

== Early life ==
Tyamashe was born in Kimberley, Cape Colony, on 5 September 1890. Tyamzashe was the fourth of seven children of Reverend Gwayi Tyamzashe, who was an early missionary of the congregational church, and Rachel MacKriel who was of Scottish-French descent. When his father, the Reverend Gwayi Tyamzashe died in 1896, Rachel returned to her family in Mafikeng and sent Tyamzashe and his siblings to the Eastern Province (known since 1994 as the Eastern Cape) to be raised by their paternal uncles.

== Education ==
Tyamzashe received his primary school education at Peelton Mission School near King Williams Town. As Tyamzashe came from a musical family, he learned to play the organ from the age of 10. His uncles also exposed him to Xhosa traditional music from an early age. He attended the Lovedale College in Alice from 1905 to 1909, where he obtained a Primary Teacher’s Diploma. He was also a member of the male choir at the Lovedale College during his time there. He continued to study and obtained a Senior Teachers Diploma as well as a Drawing Teachers Diploma between 1913 and 1923. In addition Tyamzashe completed a correspondence course with the Tonic Solfa College in London. He matriculated in 1939 and attempted to study a Bachelor of Arts degree at the University of South Africa however, he did not proceed with this due to the death of his wife.

== Career ==
Tyamzashe’s teaching career started while he was still a student at the Lovedale College. He also briefly taught at Dordrecht near Cape Town and also at Mafikeng. From 1913 to 1924, he taught at the Tiger Kloof Educational Institute in Vryburg. At Tiger Kloof, he worked as a teacher, trained the choir and also played the harmonium for the school assembly. During his spare time while working at the Tiger Kloof Educational Institute, he obtained an Associate Diploma via correspondence from the Tonic Solfa College in London, England with distinction. This degree included instruction in solfa notation, elementary harmony, counterpoint, form and style. His colleagues encouraged him in his music career and he started composing music during his time at Tiger Kloof. He moved to Cala in Transkei in 1925 where he started working as a principal of the Higher Mission School. He continued to compose, mainly for primary schools. His five SSC (two sopranos and contralto) part songs, ‘Abantwana besikole’ (translated ‘school children)', ‘Amagqabi emiti’ (the leaves), ‘Ikonjane’ (translated the swallow bird), ‘Ukuba bendinamaphiko’ (translated ‘’If I had wings’’) and ‘U-Nonhayi’ became, and still remain, firm favorites for Xhosa primary school choir teachers. In 1925, his song ‘Ivoti’ was the set piece for the Transkei-Cape choir competition making it the first vernacular composition to be a set piece.

The majority of Tyamzashe’s compositions are choral works. It is almost impossible to establish a chronology of his works as he seldom dated a manuscript and the date of publication is not an indication of the date of composition. Nevertheless, it is generally accepted that the first song he composed was ‘Isithandwa sam’ (My beloved) in 1917. His works are also divided into 3 periods which corresponded to the 3 places where he lived and worked.

Many scholars such as Hansen say that Tymzashe music was almost entirely western influenced even though he was exposed to traditional Xhosa music from an early age. It was only from 1947 that Xhosa traditional folk music started becoming recognisable in his compositions through the incorporation of Xhosa idioms, rhythms and melodies.

=== Works in Cala ===
During his time in Cala, he led the Transkei Border Troupe which was a group which specialised in Xhosa indigenous music. He also composed the song ‘Zweliya duduma’ for a 3000 voice choir which incorporated aspects of the Xhosa prophet Ntsikana’s chant. The song ‘Zweliya duduma’ was performed in Umtata in 1947 to welcome the British royal family to the Eastern Cape.

=== Works in Zinyoka ===
At Zinyoka he specialised in pieces de occasion, which was usually on request. These include:

- Mthin (athin’) amahlungulu that invoked God’s blessing on the Methodist Church was written in 1963 in Port Elizabeth.
- Unobantu was composed for the opening of the new dining hall at the exclusive Xhosa Mount Arthur Girls’ High School in Lady Frere
- Ekhaya Radio Bantu for the new radio Xhosa studios in the Ciskei
- Iskhukhukazi for a choir of 500 voices, asking for Gods blessing for Queen Elizabeth II at her coronation in 1952.
- Huntshu C.L.A. yo mneno-nciba which praised the Ciskeian Legislative Assembly
- Ibhetil Intsimbi yaBantu which praised the Intsimbi newspaper of Transkei.

=== Requiems for funerals ===
- Uwvumi umthetho wa Thixho for the eldest son of Kaiser Matanzima
- Lala Ngoxolo (Rest in Peace) for a close friend of his son who died after a car accident.

=== Roman Catholic Church ===
Due to his western and indigenous music skills, he was approached in 1965 by Father Himer to rewrite the Catholic Mass at Indawe, Ciskei and thereafter, he started writing for the Roman Catholic Church.

He was described as a versatile and quick thinking musician. He is also considered to be one of the first African composers whose African traditional music background was evident in their compositions.

Tyamzashe continued to work as a school principal until his retirement in 1950. He retired to his farm in Zinyoka near King Williams Town. He died in East London, Cape Province.

== Personal life ==
Tyamzashe married Mercy Gladys Xiniwe in 1918 and had four sons and two daughters with her. He remarried after his wife’s death in 1938 however, this marriage was unsuccessful. In 1950, shortly before his retirement, he married Agnes Nomasango. She died a few years after their marriage. Tyamzashe died due to cardiac failure at Frere Hospital in East London. He was buried on his farm in Zinyoka near King Williams Town. He is survived by his six children, all from his first marriage to Mercy.

He composed the wedding song umtshato ka dokotile for his son Victor, who was a doctor.

== Honours ==
Tyamzashe’s work has received much recognition. Many of his compositions have been used as set pieces for choir competitions including Ukuba bendinamaphiko (TUATA 1961), Inyibiba (Transkei 1964), and Intlokomo (Transkei 1965)

In 1968, his song Ududa nabo liXhaga leDini received the only prize awarded for an African composers in the South African Composers Society. He received an Honorary Masters of Arts degree from the University of Fort Hare in recognition for the contributions he made to Xhosa music.

== See also ==
- Abdullah Ibrahim
- Cherry Wainer
- Nofinishi Dywili
