= Glen Grey Provincial Hospital =

- Eastern Cape Department of Health

Geography
- Location: Cacadu, Eastern Cape, South Africa
- Coordinates: 31°43′13″S 27°11′57″E

Organisation
- Care system: Public
- Type: Community

Services
- Emergency department: Yes
- Beds: 151

Links
- Website: Eastern Cape Department of Health website - Chris Hani District Hospitals
- Other links: List of hospitals in South Africa

Glen Grey Provincial Hospital is a Provincial government funded hospital for the Emalahleni Local Municipality area in Cacadu, Eastern Cape in South Africa.

The hospital departments include Emergency department, Paediatric ward, Maternity ward, Out Patients Department, Surgical Services, Medical Services, Operating Theatre & CSSD Services, Pharmacy, Anti-Retroviral (ARV) treatment for HIV/AIDS, Post Trauma Counseling Services, Termination of Pregnancy Services, X-ray Services, Physiotherapy, NHLS Laboratory, Laundry Services, Kitchen Services and Mortuary.
