= Dordrecht Hospital =

- Eastern Cape Dept of Health

Geography
- Location: Dordrecht, Eastern Cape, South Africa
- Coordinates: 31°22′18″S 27°03′05″E

Organisation
- Care system: Public
- Type: Community

Services
- Emergency department: Yes
- Beds: 35

Links
- Website: Eastern Cape Department of Health website - Chris Hani District Hospitals
- Other links: List of hospitals in South Africa

Dordrecht Hospital is a Provincial government funded hospital in the Emalahleni Municipality, situated in Dordrecht, Eastern Cape in South Africa. Previously, it was a Provincially Aided Hospital (until December 2010).

The hospital departments include Emergency department, Out Patients Department, Paediatric ward, Maternity ward, Surgical Services, Medical Services, Operating Theatre & CSSD Services, Pharmacy, Anti-Retroviral (ARV) treatment for HIV/AIDS, Post Trauma Counseling Services, Laundry Services, Kitchen Services and Mortuary.
