= Cofimvaba Hospital =

- Eastern Cape Department of Health

Geography
- Location: Cofimvaba, Chris Hani District Municipality, Eastern Cape, South Africa
- Coordinates: 32°00′43″S 27°34′59″E

Organisation
- Care system: Public
- Type: Community

Services
- Emergency department: Yes

History
- Opened: 1986

Links
- Website: Eastern Cape Department of Health website - Chris Hani District Hospitals
- Lists: Hospitals in South Africa
- Other links: List of hospitals in South Africa

Cofimvaba Hospital is a Provincial government funded rural general hospital in Cofimvaba, Eastern Cape in South Africa.

The hospital departments include Emergency department, Paediatric ward, Maternity ward, Gynaecology Services, Out Patients Department, Surgical Services, Medical Services, Operating Theatre & CSSD Services, Pharmacy, Anti-Retroviral (ARV) treatment for HIV/AIDS, Post Trauma Counseling Services, Physiotherapy, Occupational Services, Laboratory Services, X-ray Services, Laundry Services, Kitchen Services and Mortuary.
