= Frontier Hospital =

Frontier Hospital Grens Hospitaal
- Eastern Cape Department of Health

Geography
- Location: Queenstown, Enoch Mgijima Local Municipality, Eastern Cape, South Africa
- Coordinates: 31°53′21″S 26°52′17″E

Organisation
- Care system: Public
- Type: Regional

Services
- Emergency department: Yes
- Beds: 254 (450 planned)

Links
- Website: Eastern Cape Department of Health website - Chris Hani District Hospitals
- Other links: List of hospitals in South Africa

Frontier Hospital is a Level 2 Regional government funded hospital in Queenstown, Eastern Cape in South Africa. Frontier was founded in 1904.

The hospital departments include Emergency department, Paediatric ward, Maternity ward, Obstetrics, Gynaecology Services, Out Patients Department, Surgical Services, Medical Services, Operating Theatre & CSSD Services, Pharmacy, Anti-Retroviral (ARV) treatment for HIV/AIDS, Post Trauma Counseling Services, Dentistry, Physiotherapy, Occupational Services, Speech-Language and Hearing Therapy Services, Audiology, Laboratory Services, X-ray Services, Laundry Services and Kitchen Services.
