= Komani Psychiatric Hospital =

- Eastern Cape Department of Health

Geography
- Location: Komani, Enoch Mgijima Local Municipality, Eastern Cape, South Africa
- Coordinates: 31°55′25″S 26°54′48″E

Organisation
- Care system: Specialiazed
- Type: Psychiatric

Services
- Emergency department: No

Links
- Website: Komani Psychiatrict Hospital
- Other links: List of hospitals in South Africa

Komani Psychiatric Hospital is a government funded psychiatric hospital and drug rehabilitation centre in Komani, Eastern Cape in South Africa.

The hospital departments include a Rehabilitation Centre, pharmacy, Anti-Retroviral (ARV) treatment for HIV/AIDS, Post Trauma Counseling Services, Laundry Services and Kitchen Services.
