= Geldenhuys v Borman =

South African legal case

In Geldenhuys v Borman, an important case in the South African law of succession, the testator had executed a total of three wills, each revoking the previous one. For about three years the testator was a patient in Fort England, but he was released at a later stage. At the time the last will was executed, and although the testator was declared incapable of managing his affairs, there was no declaration that the testator was mentally incapable. Geldenhuys approached the court to declare all three wills invalid. The court noted that there is a presumption of competency, so that the onus of proof is on the person alleging incapacity. The court held that Geldenhuys had not discharged this onus, as incapacity to manage one's affairs is not the same as mental incapacity. The wills were accordingly declared valid.

== See also ==
- South African law of succession
- Geldenhuys v National Director of Public Prosecutions
