= All Saints Hospital =

All Saints Hospital may refer to:

- All Saints Hospital (South Africa)
- All Saints Hospital (Racine, Wisconsin)
- All Saints' Hospital, Winson Green, Birmingham, England
- All Saints' Hospital, Southwark, London, England
- All Saints by the Hospital, a former name of All Saints' Church, Cambridge
