= St. Elizabeth Hospital =

St. Elizabeth Hospital may refer to:

== United States ==
- Saint Elizabeth Community Hospital (Red Bluff, California)
- St. Elizabeth's Hospital (O'Fallon, Illinois), in the Hospital Sisters Health System
- St. Elizabeth Hospital (Gonzales, Louisiana), now Our Lady of the Lake Ascension
- St. Elizabeth's Hospital (Boston, Massachusetts), now St. Elizabeth's Medical Center
- St. Elizabeth Hospital (Hannibal, Missouri)
- St. Elizabeth Hospital (Manhattan, New York City) opened in 1890 and now closed
- St. Elizabeth Ann Rehabilitation Center (Staten Island, New York City) opened in 1993
- St. Elizabeth Hospital, now St. Elizabeth Medical Center (Utica, New York)
- St. Elizabeth Hospital (Elizabeth, New Jersey), 1905; now Trinitas Regional Medical Center
- St. Elizabeth Youngstown Hospital (Youngstown, Ohio) (part of Mercy Health Partners)
- St. Elizabeth Health Services (Baker City, Oregon)
- St. Elizabeth Hospital (Beaumont, Texas)
- St. Elizabeths Hospital (Washington, D.C.)
- St. Elizabeth Hospital (Appleton, Wisconsin)
- St. Elizabeth Hospital (Enumclaw, Washington)

== Elsewhere ==
- St. Elizabeth's Hospital, Hyderabad, Pakistan
- St Elizabeth Mission Hospital, South Africa
- Sint-Elisabeth Hospital, Willemstad, Curaçao
- St. Elizabeth's Hospital, a predecessor of Shanghai Chest Hospital

== See also ==
- St. Elizabeth Medical Center (disambiguation)
