= Martje Venter Hospital =

- Eastern Cape Department of Health

Geography
- Location: Tarkastad, Eastern Cape, South Africa
- Coordinates: 32°01′S 26°16′E

Organisation
- Care system: Public
- Type: Community

Services
- Emergency department: Yes
- Beds: 20

History
- Opened: Moved October 1969

Links
- Website: Martje Venter Hospital
- Other links: List of hospitals in South Africa

Martje Venter Hospital is a Provincial government funded hospital for the Enoch Mgijima Local Municipality area in Tarkastad in South Africa.

The hospital departments include Emergency department, Out Patients Department, Paediatric ward, Maternity ward, Surgical Services, Medical Services, Operating Theatre & CSSD Services, Pharmacy, Anti-Retroviral (ARV) treatment for HIV/AIDS, VCT, Laundry Services, Kitchen Services and Mortuary.
