= Butterworth Hospital =

Butterworth Hospital may refer to:

- Butterworth Hospital (Eastern Cape)
- Butterworth Hospital (Michigan)
