= Cradock Provincial Hospital =

- Eastern Cape Department of Health

Geography
- Location: Cradock, Chris Hani District Municipality, Eastern Cape, South Africa
- Coordinates: 32°10′02″S 25°37′21″E

Organisation
- Care system: Public
- Type: District/Community

Services
- Emergency department: Yes

History
- Closed: Currently open

Links
- Website: web.archive.org/web/20131021155141/http://www.ecdoh.gov.za/hospitals/54/Cradock_Hospital
- Lists: Hospitals in South Africa
- Other links: List of hospitals in South Africa

Cradock Provincial Hospital is a Provincial government funded hospital for the Inxuba Yethemba Local Municipality area in Cradock, Eastern Cape in South Africa.

The hospital departments include Emergency department, Paediatric ward, Maternity ward, Out Patients Department, Surgical Services, Medical Services, Operating Theatre & CSSD Services, Pharmacy, Anti-Retroviral (ARV) treatment for HIV/AIDS, Post Trauma Counseling Services, X-ray Services, Physiotherapy, NHLS Laboratory, Laundry Services, Kitchen Services and Mortuary.
