= Mjanyana Hospital =

- Eastern Cape Department of Health

Geography
- Location: Ngcobo, Eastern Cape, South Africa
- Coordinates: 31°40′29″S 28°00′12″E

Organisation
- Care system: Public
- Type: Community

Services
- Emergency department: Yes

Links
- Website: Mjanyana Hospital
- Other links: List of hospitals in South Africa

Mjanyana Hospital is a Provincial government funded hospital in Ngcobo in the Chris Hani District Municipality of the Eastern Cape Province of South Africa.

The hospital departments include Emergency department, Paediatric ward, Out Patients Department, Surgical Services, Medical Services, Operating Theatre & CSSD Services, Pharmacy, Anti-Retroviral (ARV) treatment for HIV/AIDS, Post Trauma Counseling Services, Termination of Pregnancy Services, X-ray Services, Occupational Health Services, Laundry, Kitchen Services and Mortuary.

The hospital was created in 1893 by 4000 leper patients sent away by missionaries. On 2 October, 2018, the hospital celebrated its 125th anniversary.
