= Emalahleni Local Municipality =

Emalahleni Local Municipality may refer to two places in South Africa:

- Emalahleni Local Municipality, Eastern Cape
- Emalahleni Local Municipality, Mpumalanga
