= Duncan Village Day Hospital =

- Eastern Cape Department of Health

Geography
- Location: East London, Eastern Cape, South Africa
- Coordinates: 32°55′51″S 27°54′34″E

Organisation
- Care system: Public
- Type: Community

Services
- Emergency department: Yes

Links
- Website: Duncan Village Day Hospital
- Other links: List of hospitals in South Africa

Duncan Village Day Hospital is a Provincial government funded day hospital situated Braelyn in East London, Eastern Cape in South Africa. Patients are attended to by doctors as well as registered nurse practitioners.

This day hospital offers primary health care services on an outpatient basis. They also have a small onsite anti-retroviral (ARV) and tuberculosis (TB) clinic. Basic gynaecology and family planning services are also available.

They do attend to minor emergency cases, but emergencies are referred to Frere Hospital. For non-urgent services, patients are referred to Empilweni Gompo, e.g. physiotherapy.

This day hospital's facilities include Pharmacy, Anti-Retroviral (ARV) treatment for HIV/AIDS, and X-ray Services.

== Notes ==
built in the 1950s
