= Inkwanca Local Municipality =

Coordinates: 31.3950°S 26.3622°E

Inkwanca
- Former local municipality
- Seal

- Location in the Eastern Cape
- Country: South Africa
- Province: Eastern Cape
- District: Chris Hani
- Seat: Molteno
- Wards: 4

Government
  - Type: Municipal council
  - Mayor: Mtandazo Qhaqmangwana

Area
  - Total: 3,584 km^{2} (1,384 sq mi)

Population (2011)
  - Total: 21,971
  - Density: 6.130/km^{2} (15.88/sq mi)

Racial makeup (2011)
  - Black African: 89.1%
  - Coloured: 4.1%
  - Indian/Asian: 0.2%
  - White: 6.2%

First languages (2011)
  - Xhosa: 85.8%
  - Afrikaans: 8.3%
  - English: 3.5%
  - Other: 2.4%
- Time zone: UTC+2 (SAST)
- Municipal code: EC133

Inkwanca Local Municipality was a local municipality that forms part of the Chris Hani District Municipality in the Eastern Cape province of South Africa. Inkwanca is an isiXhosa name meaning cold. The municipal area is the coldest area in the country and the lowest temperatures are recorded in the area every year. After municipal elections on 3 August 2016 it was merged into the larger Enoch Mgijima Local Municipality.

== Geography ==
The municipality covers an area of 3,584 square kilometres (1,384 sq mi) in the Stormberg Mountains, approximately 200 kilometres (120 mi) northwest of East London. It abuts on the Gariep Local Municipality to the north, the Maletswai Local Municipality to the northeast, the Emalahleni Local Municipality to the east, the Lukhanji Local Municipality to the southeast and the Tsolwana Local Municipality to the southwest.

The population of the municipality according to the 2011 census was 21,971 people in 6,228 households. 89.1% of residents described themselves as "Black African", 6.2% as "White" and 4.1% as "Coloured". 85.8% speak Xhosa as their first language, 8.3% speak Afrikaans and 3.5% speak English. The two towns in the municipality are Molteno (pop. 11,553) and Sterkstroom (pop. 7,165).

== Politics ==
The municipal council consisted of seven members elected by mixed-member proportional representation. Four councillors were elected by first-past-the-post voting in four wards, while the remaining three were chosen from party lists so that the total number of party representatives was proportional to the number of votes received.

=== 2011 election ===
In the election of 18 May 2011 the African National Congress (ANC) won a majority of five seats on the council. The following table shows the results of the election.

Party	Votes				Seats		
Party	Ward	List	Total	%	Ward	List	Total
ANC	5,214	5,276	10,490	76.2	4	1	5
DA	955	907	1,862	13.5	0	1	1
COPE	708	667	1,375	10.0	0	1	1
UDM	–	33	33	0.2	–	0	0
Total	6,877	6,883	13,760	100.0	4	3	7
Spoilt votes	114	108	222				

=== 2014 election ===
On 11 September 2014 the Inkwanca municipal council was dissolved, and new elections were held on 26 November. The African National Congress (ANC) again won a majority of five seats on the council. The following table shows the results of the election.

Party	Votes				Seats		
Party	Ward	List	Total	%	Ward	List	Total
ANC	4,192	4,166	8,358	63.3	3	2	5
DA	1,125	1,127	2,252	17.1	1	0	1
COPE	1,117	1,117	2,234	16.9	0	1	1
AIC	172	188	360	2.7	0	0	0
Total	6,606	6,598	13,204	100.0	4	3	7
Spoilt votes	130	146	276				
