= Molteno Hospital =

Molteno Provincial Hospital
- Eastern Cape Department of Health

Geography
- Location: Molteno, Eastern Cape, South Africa
- Coordinates: 32°34′16″S 27°25′06″E

Organisation
- Care system: Public
- Type: Community

Services
- Emergency department: Yes
- Beds: 25

Links
- Website: Eastern Cape Department of Health website - Chris Hani District Hospitals
- Other links: List of hospitals in South Africa

Molteno Hospital is a Provincial government funded hospital for the Enoch Mgijima Local Municipality area in Molteno, Eastern Cape in South Africa.

The hospital departments include Emergency department, Paediatric ward, Maternity ward, Out Patients Department, Surgical Services, Medical Services, Operating Theatre & CSSD Services, Pharmacy, Anti-Retroviral (ARV) treatment for HIV/AIDS, Post Trauma Counseling Services, X-ray Services, Physiotherapy, Laundry Services, Kitchen Services and Mortuary.
