= Adelaide Hospital =

Adelaide Hospital may refer to:

- Adelaide Hospital (Dublin) situated in Dublin, Ireland
- Adelaide Provincial Hospital (Eastern Cape) situated in Adelaide, Eastern Cape, South Africa
- Royal Adelaide Hospital in Adelaide, South Australia
