= Cloete Joubert Hospital =

Cloete-Joubert Hospital
- Eastern Cape Department of Health

Geography
- Location: Barkly East, Joe Gqabi District Municipality, Eastern Cape, South Africa
- Coordinates: 30°58′06″S 27°35′13″E

Organisation
- Care system: Public
- Type: Community

Services
- Emergency department: Yes
- Beds: 25

Links
- Website: Eastern Cape Department of Health website - Joe Gqabi District Hospitals
- Lists: Hospitals in South Africa
- Other links: List of hospitals in South Africa

Cloete-Joubert Hospital is a Provincial government-funded hospital for the Senqu Local Municipality area in Barkly East in the Eastern Cape of South Africa. It forms a cluster with Empilisweni, Lady Grey and Umlamli Hospitals.
