= Komga Hospital =

Komga Provincial Hospital
- Eastern Cape Department of Health

Geography
- Location: Komga, Amathole District Municipality, Eastern Cape, South Africa
- Coordinates: 32°35′15″S 27°53′09″E

Organisation
- Care system: Public
- Type: Community

Services
- Emergency department: Yes
- Beds: 15

History
- Opened: Moved to new site in 1997

Links
- Website: Eastern Cape Department of Health website - Amathole District Hospitals
- Other links: List of hospitals in South Africa

Komga Hospital is a small provincial government-funded hospital for the Great Kei Local Municipality area in Komga, Eastern Cape in South Africa.

In 1997 the old hospital in Rhodes Avenue closed and moved to the new hospital situated in Victoria Road which was built by Public Works.

The hospital departments include an emergency department, maternity and paediatrics wards, outpatient department, medical services, pharmacy, anti-retroviral treatment for HIV/AIDS, x-ray services, laundry services, kitchen services, and a mortuary.
