= St Francis Chronic Hospital =

St Francis (TB) Hospital
- Eastern Cape Department of Health

Geography
- Location: Aliwal North, Joe Gqabi District Municipality, Eastern Cape, South Africa
- Coordinates: 30°41′27″S 26°41′39″E

Organisation
- Care system: Public
- Type: Specialised

Services
- Emergency department: No

Links
- Website: Eastern Cape Department of Health website - Joe Gqabi District Hospitals
- Other links: List of hospitals in South Africa

St Francis Hospital is a defunct Provincial government funded TB hospital for the Walter Sisulu Local Municipality area in Aliwal North, Eastern Cape in South Africa. It had 26 beds. Prior to the provincial government's 2010 implementation of provincialization, it was a provincially aided hospital that received both government and private funds and was privately managed. It stopped functioning in 2022.

The hospital departments included Pharmacy, Anti-Retroviral (ARV) treatment for HIV/AIDS, TB Services, Physiotherapy, Out Patients Department, Laundry and Kitchen Services.
