= Dr Maliso Mphele Hospital =

Dr Malizo Mpehle Memorial Hospital
- Eastern Cape Dept of Health

Geography
- Location: Tsolo, OR Tambo District Municipality, Eastern Cape, South Africa
- Coordinates: 31°19′03″S 28°46′39″E

Organisation
- Care system: Public
- Type: Community

Services
- Emergency department: Yes

Links
- Other links: List of hospitals in South Africa

Dr Malizo Mpehle Hospital is a Provincial government funded hospital in Tsolo, Eastern Cape in South Africa.

The hospital departments include Emergency department, Paediatric ward, Maternity ward, Gynaecology Services, Out Patients Department, Surgical Services, Medical Services, Operating Theatre & CSSD Services, Pharmacy, Anti-Retroviral (ARV) treatment for HIV/AIDS, Post Trauma Counseling Services, Physiotherapy, Occupational Services, Laboratory Services, X-ray Services, Laundry Services, Kitchen Services and Mortuary.

The hospital is named after Malizo Bantu Mpehle.
