= Nkqubela Chest Hospital =

- Eastern Cape Department of Health

Geography
- Location: Mdantsane, Buffalo City Metropolitan Municipality, Eastern Cape, South Africa
- Coordinates: 32°55′22″S 27°44′51″E

Organisation
- Care system: Public
- Type: Specialised TB

Services
- Emergency department: No

Links
- Website: www.ecdoh.gov.za/hospitals/45/Nkqubela_SANTA_Hospital%20Nkqubela
- Lists: Hospitals in South Africa

Nkqubela Chest Hospital is a specialised TB hospital situated in Mdantsane near East London, Eastern Cape in South Africa. It was established in 1965 and used to be operated by Lifecare as a TB hospital.

The hospital departments include Medical Services, Paediatrics, Out Patients Department, Pharmacy, TB Services, PMTC & VCT, Anti-Retroviral (ARV) treatment for HIV/AIDS, X-ray Services, Occupational Services, Laundry Services and Kitchen Services.
