= Madwaleni Hospital =

- Eastern Cape Department of Health

Geography
- Location: near Elliotdale, Eastern Cape, South Africa
- Coordinates: 32°05′51″S 28°52′48″E

Organisation
- Care system: Public
- Type: Community

Services
- Emergency department: Yes

Links
- Website: Madwaleni Hospital
- Other links: List of hospitals in South Africa

Madwaleni Hospital is a Provincial government funded hospital near rural Elliotdale, Eastern Cape in South Africa.

The hospital departments include Emergency department, Paediatric ward, Maternity ward, Obstetrics, Gynaecology Services, Out Patients Department, Surgical Services, Medical Services, Operating Theatre & CSSD Services, Pharmacy, Anti-Retroviral (ARV) treatment for HIV/AIDS, Post Trauma Counseling Services, Dentistry, Physiotherapy, Occupational Services, Laboratory Services, X-ray Services, Laundry Services and Kitchen Services.

== History ==
The Madwaleni hospital was built in 1959 by Dutch Reformed Missionaries and was taken over in 1976 by the South African government's Department of Health. The main policy which the hospital associates itself with is that of Batho Pele, a term that means "People First", and is followed by the hospital's management team and staff, supporting the patient's right charter. The Madwaleni Hospital is one that provides a primary level of care and serves the population of the Mbashe sub-district of Amathole, which is 262 000 and rated the eighth most deprived in the country. It contains 180 beds for its in-patients that is distributed between seven wards, including Maternity, Paediatrics, Female General, Male General, Isolation (Mdr)and outreach programme (High care HIV), TB Female, and TB Male.

== HIV Wellness and ART Programme ==
The HIV Wellness and ART Programme at the Madwaleni Hospital is a public sector service that offers treatment and care for HIV/AIDS to the surrounding Mbashe community. The Programme at the hospital is supported by the Eastern Cape Department of Health along with the Donald Woods Foundation, and has been funded by organizations such as the Elton John AIDS Foundation and Aurum Health. By June 2005, ART delivery began, and in October 2009, 4000 adult patients were registered with the programme. The goal of the HIV Wellness and ART Programme at the hospital is to have as many HIV-positive people enrolled into the programme before their illnesses become serious, giving patients enough time to prepare and educate themselves on HIV and antiretroviral therapy. This is done fore the purpose of health monitoring, as well as to ease the transition onto antiretrovirals when it becomes necessary for the patients to take them. The HIV Wellness and ART Programme also offers HIV counselling and testing.

== Hospital staff shortages ==
In recent times, the Madwaleni Hospital has come under scrutiny due to its lack of infrastructure, difficulty in attracting staff, and its inability to obtain proper resources. In early 2012 the hospital faced the possibility of closure as a shortage of doctors left only two junior doctors remaining, which wasn't nearly enough to handle the hospital's large number of patients, where about 1800 births occur every year in the labour ward. Dr. Richard Cooke, who was a former doctor at the Madwaleni Hospital, is quoted as saying that at the very least, 6 or 7 doctors are needed to run the hospital. Responsible for this shortage of doctors at the hospital is a delay in registering foreign doctors who are qualified for the available positions, as well as the failure to hire community service doctors. The Eastern Cape health department head, Dr. Siva Pillay, started to create incentives for current doctors as well as aspiring doctors to come and work at Madwaleni Hospital, including signing employment offer letters, building more houses for doctors, and providing medical bursaries to local students who qualify for them, on the condition that they work at Madwaleni.
