= Tafalofefe Hospital =

- Eastern Cape Department of Health

Geography
- Location: Butterworth, Amathole District Municipality, Eastern Cape, South Africa
- Coordinates: 32°25′47″S 28°28′27″E

Organisation
- Care system: Public
- Type: Community

Services
- Emergency department: Yes

Links
- Website: Eastern Cape Department of Health website - Amathole District Hospitals
- Other links: List of hospitals in South Africa

Tafalofefe Hospital is a provincial government funded hospital in the Mnquma Local Municipality area outside Butterworth, Eastern Cape in South Africa.

The hospital includes an emergency department, ophthalmology, outpatients department, surgical services, medical services, operating theatre & CSSD services, pharmacy, anti-retroviral (ARV) treatment for HIV/AIDS, post-trauma counseling services, NHLS laboratory, laundry services, kitchen services and mortuary.
