= Uitenhage Provincial Hospital =

- Eastern Cape Department of Health

Geography
- Location: Uitenhage, Nelson Mandela Bay Metropolitan Municipality, Eastern Cape, South Africa
- Coordinates: 33°46′08″S 25°23′17″E

Organisation
- Care system: Public
- Type: Community

Services
- Emergency department: Yes

Links
- Website: www.ecdoh.gov.za/hospitals/65/Uitenhage_Hospital
- Lists: Hospitals in South Africa

Uitenhage Provincial Hospital is a Provincial government funded hospital in Uitenhage, Eastern Cape, South Africa.

The hospital departments include Emergency department, Paediatric ward, Maternity ward, Obstetrics/Gynecology, Out Patients Department, Surgical Services, Medical Services, Operating Theatre & CSSD Services, Pharmacy, Anti-Retroviral (ARV) treatment for HIV/AIDS, Post Trauma Counseling Services, X-ray Services, Physiotherapy, NHLS Laboratory, ICU & Renal Unit, Rape Crises Centre, Occupational Services, Social Workers, Laundry Services, Kitchen Services and Mortuary.
