= Maclear Hospital =

- Eastern Cape Dept of Health

Geography
- Location: Maclear, Joe Gqabi District Municipality, Eastern Cape, South Africa
- Coordinates: 31°04′33″S 28°20′52″E

Organisation
- Care system: Public
- Type: District/Community

Services
- Emergency department: Yes
- Beds: 38

Links
- Website: Eastern Cape Department of Health website - Joe Gqabi District Hospitals
- Other links: List of hospitals in South Africa

Maclear Hospital is a provincial government funded hospital for the Elundini Local Municipality area in Maclear, Eastern Cape in South Africa. It has 38 beds.

In March 2025, workers at the hospital staged a go-slow to protest inadequate staffing.
