= Fort Grey TB Hospital =

- Eastern Cape Department of Health

Geography
- Location: East London, Eastern Cape, South Africa
- Coordinates: 33°01′32″S 27°49′37″E

Organisation
- Care system: Public
- Type: Specialist

Services
- Emergency department: No
- Speciality: Tuberculosis and Chest

Links
- Website: Fort Grey TB Hospital
- Other links: List of hospitals in South Africa

Fort Grey TB Hospital is a specialised Provincial government-funded Tuberculosis and Chest hospital situated in East London, Eastern Cape in South Africa. It was established in 1955 and used to be a SANTA TB hospital.

The hospital departments include an Out Patients Department, Pharmacy, Anti-Retroviral (ARV) treatment for HIV/AIDS, X-ray Services, Laundry Services, Kitchen Services and Mortuary.
