= Stutterheim Provincial Hospital =

- Eastern Cape Department of Health

Geography
- Location: Stutterheim, Amathole District Municipality, Eastern Cape, South Africa
- Coordinates: 32°34′16″S 27°25′06″E

Organisation
- Care system: Public
- Type: Community

Services
- Emergency department: Yes

Links
- Website: Stutterheim Hospital
- Other links: List of hospitals in South Africa

Stutterheim Hospital is a Provincial government funded hospital in the Amahlathi Local Municipality area in Stutterheim, Eastern Cape in South Africa.

The hospital departments include Emergency department, Paediatric ward, Maternity ward, Out Patients Department, Surgical Services, Medical Services, Operating Theatre & CSSD Services, Pharmacy, Anti-Retroviral (ARV) treatment for HIV/AIDS, Post Trauma Counseling Services, X-ray Services, Physiotherapy, Laundry Services, Kitchen Services and Mortuary.
