= Jose Pearson TB Hospital =

- Eastern Cape Department of Health

Geography
- Location: Linton Grange, outside of Port Elizabeth, Eastern Cape, South Africa
- Coordinates: 33°30′S 25°18′E

Organisation
- Care system: Public
- Type: Specialised TB

Services
- Emergency department: No

Links
- Website: Jose Pearson TB Hospital
- Other links: List of hospitals in South Africa

Jose Pearson TB Hospital is a specialised Provincial government funded TB hospital situated outside Port Elizabeth in South Africa. It was established in 1966 and used to be a SANTA TB hospital. It was founded by Mrs Josephine (Jose, pronounced Josi) Pearson.

The hospital departments include an Out Patients Department, Pharmacy, Anti-Retroviral (ARV) treatment for HIV/AIDS, X-ray Services, Laundry Services, Kitchen Services and Mortuary.
