= Indwe =

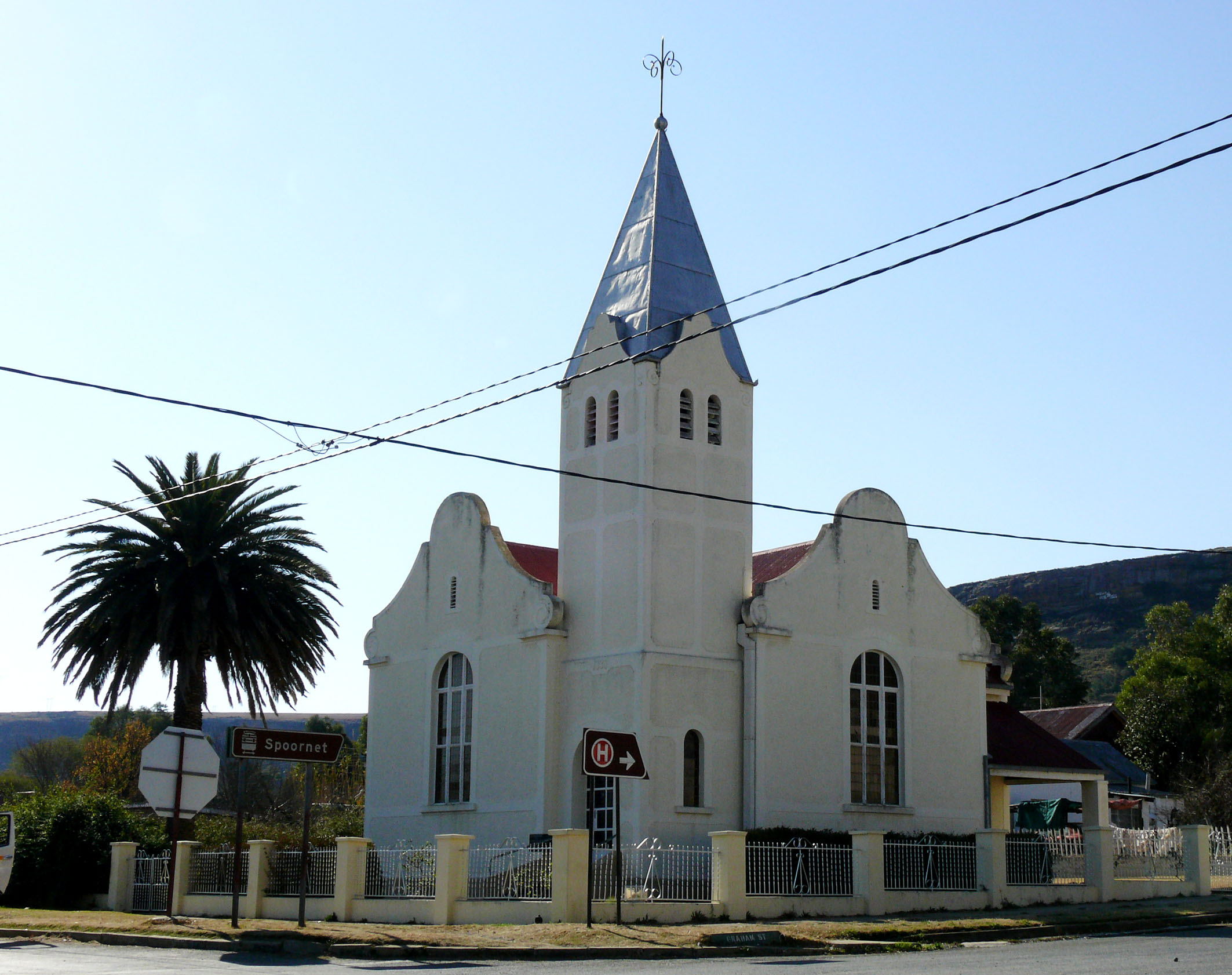
- Reformed Church in Indwe

- Location within Eastern Cape Location within South Africa
- Coordinates: 31.466°S 27.333°E
- Country: South Africa
- Province: Eastern Cape
- District: Chris Hani
- Municipality: Emalahleni

Area
  - Total: 20.8 km^{2} (8.0 sq mi)

Population (2011)
  - Total: 7,934
  - Density: 381/km^{2} (988/sq mi)

Racial makeup (2011)
  - Black African: 95.7%
  - Coloured: 3.0%
  - Indian/Asian: 0.2%
  - White: 0.8%
  - Other: 0.4%

First languages (2011)
  - Xhosa: 91.8%
  - Afrikaans: 3.6%
  - English: 1.8%
  - Other: 2.8%
- Time zone: UTC+2 (SAST)
- Postal code (street): 5445
- PO box: 5445
- Area code: 045

Indwe is a small town in Chris Hani District Municipality near Dordrecht in the Eastern Cape province of South Africa.

The town is situated between Dordrecht and Elliot on the R56 road. It was founded in 1896 as a centre for coal-mining activities which started in 1867, and attained municipal status in 1898. It takes its name from the Indwe River, named after the blue crane (Anthropoides paradiseus, Xhosa: iNdwe), which occurred there in great numbers. Indwe is a small town surrounded by a number of farms with a large number of merino sheep and cattle ranchers in the region.

== History ==
Indwe was the fourth town after Johannesburg, Cape Town and Kimberley to have electricity. The “Indwe Railway Collieries and Land Company” was formed in Kimberley in late 1894. De Beers played a big part in it. The railway line was completed in March 1896. By 1899 the mine produced well over 100 000 tons of coal a year. By 1917 the coal mine closed down since in the intervening years better quality coal had been discovered in the Transvaal. Indwe Railway station was one of the busiest stations in South Africa, offering people from the rural Transkei a port of entry to Johannesburg and Cape Town up until 1994. Indwe compromises five townships, namely Mavuya, Manyano, Mzamomhle, Phumlani and Sonwabile township. Mavuya is the biggest township in Indwe, and one of the oldest townships in South Africa. Mavuya township is considered to be older than Langa (Cape Town) and Alexandra (Johannesburg).

== Economy ==
Many people in Indwe are self employed. People work in mines and sell the coal. Brick making in Indwe is popular and it is the main source of income where people make bricks and sell them in communities. Indwe resort is a popular spot in summer where people have fun and popular DJs are invited. and there are many events that are hosted in the resort. Some people work for the municipality to clean the roads, and there are five schools, one of which is Siyakhula Primary School, which is popular in sports.

== Notable people ==
- Margaret Mary Smith (née MacDonald, 1916–1987), ichthyologist
