= St Barnabas Hospital (Eastern Cape) =

Hospital in Libode, Eastern Cape, South Africa

- Eastern Cape Dept of Health

Geography
- Location: Libode, OR Tambo District Municipality, Eastern Cape, South Africa
- Coordinates: 31°32′47″S 29°01′14″E

Organisation
- Care system: Public
- Type: Community

Services
- Emergency department: Yes

Links
- Lists: Hospitals in South Africa

St Barnabas Hospital is a Provincial government funded hospital for the Nyandeni Local Municipality area in Libode, Eastern Cape in South Africa. It serves a population of 290 390.

The hospital departments include Emergency department, Paediatric ward, Maternity ward, Out Patients Department, Surgical Services, Medical Services, Operating Theatre & CSSD Services, Pharmacy, Anti-Retroviral (ARV) treatment for HIV/AIDS, Post Trauma Counseling Services, X-ray Services, Physiotherapy, NHLS Laboratory, Laundry Services, Kitchen Services and Mortuary.
