= Zithulele Hospital =

- Eastern Cape Department of Health

Geography
- Location: Mqanduli, King Sabata Dalindyebo Local Municipality, OR Tambo District Municipality, Eastern Cape, South Africa
- Coordinates: 32°2′57″S 29°3′37″E

Organisation
- Care system: Public
- Type: Community

Services
- Emergency department: Yes
- Beds: 147

History
- Opened: (Site marked out in 1961)

Links
- Website: Zithulele Hospital
- Other links: List of hospitals in South Africa

Zithulele Hospital is a Provincial government funded hospital near Mqanduli, Eastern Cape in South Africa. While the postal address for the hospital is Mqanduli, the hospital itself is southeast approximately 3 km from the ocean.

The hospital departments include Emergency department, Paediatric ward, Maternity ward, Out Patients Department, Surgical Services, Medical Services, Operating Theatre & CSSD Services, Pharmacy, Anti-Retroviral (ARV) treatment for HIV/AIDS, Post Trauma Counseling Services, X-ray Services, Physiotherapy, NHLS Laboratory, Occupational Services, Laundry Services, Kitchen Services and Mortuary.
