= Livingstone Hospital =

- Eastern Cape Department of Health

Geography
- Location: Korsten, Port Elizabeth, Eastern Cape, South Africa
- Coordinates: 33°55′31″S 25°34′11″E

Organisation
- Care system: Public
- Type: Tertiary
- Affiliated university: Nelson Mandela University

Services
- Emergency department: Yes

Links
- Website: Livingstone Hospital
- Other links: List of hospitals in South Africa

Livingstone Hospital is a large Provincial government-funded hospital situated in Korsten, Port Elizabeth in South Africa. It is a tertiary hospital and forms part of the Port Elizabeth Hospital Complex.

The hospital departments include The Emergency Department, the Paediatric, the Out Patients Department, Surgical Services, Medical Services, Operating Theatre & CSSD Services, a Pharmacy, Anti-Retroviral (ARV) treatment for HIV/AIDS Wellness Clinic/ID clinic, Post Trauma Counseling Services, Occupational Services, X-ray Services, Occupational Therapy, Physiotherapy, Speech Therapy, NHLS Laboratory, Oral Health Care Provides Maxillofacial Facial, Laundry Services, Kitchen Services and a Mortuary.

== Coat of arms ==
The hospital assumed a coat of arms in 1958, described as "Azure, a pyramid Argent charged with a representation of the Donkin lighthouse Gules". The arms were registered at the Bureau of Heraldry in 1968, the lighthouse being incorrectly described as a "campanile proper". The coat of arms was designed by Ivan Mitford-Barberton.

== Administrative crises ==
As of April 2026, the hospital last had a permanent CEO in 2018. The hospital is experiencing severe staff shortages, with high levels of resignations amongst doctors, nurses and specialists, and replacements not being appointed.

At the end of March 2026, the Eastern Cape Department of Health allowed the contracts of all of the hospital's cardiologists to expire.
