= Mthatha General Hospital =

Mthatha General Hospital now known as Mthatha Regional Hospital
- Eastern Cape Department of Health

Geography
- Location: Mthatha, King Sabata Dalindyebo Local Municipality, O.R. Tambo District Municipality, Eastern Cape, South Africa
- Coordinates: 31°35′25″S 28°46′06″E

Organisation
- Care system: Public
- Type: General
- Affiliated university: Walter Sisulu University

Services
- Emergency department: Yes

Links
- Website: www.ecdoh.gov.za/hospitals/87/Mthatha_General_Hospital
- Lists: Hospitals in South Africa

Mthatha General Hospital is a large Provincial government funded hospital situated in central Mthatha in South Africa. It is a general hospital and forms part of the Mthatha Hospital Complex.

The hospital departments include Emergency department, Paediatric ward, Maternity ward, Obstetrics/Gynecology, Out Patients Department, Surgical Services, Medical Services, Operating Theatre & CSSD Services, Pharmacy, Anti-Retroviral (ARV) treatment for HIV/AIDS, Post Trauma Counseling Services, Occupational Services, X-ray Services, Physiotherapy, Speech and Audiology services, NHLS Laboratory, Oral Health Care Provides, Laundry Services, Kitchen Services and Mortuary.
