= All Saints Hospital (South Africa) =

- Eastern Cape Department of Health

Geography
- Location: Ngcobo, Chris Hani District Municipality, Eastern Cape, South Africa
- Coordinates: 31°40′35″S 28°00′05″E

Organisation
- Care system: Public
- Type: Community

Services
- Emergency department: Yes

Links
- Website: Eastern Cape Department of Health website - Chris Hani District Hospitals
- Lists: Hospitals in South Africa
- Other links: List of hospitals in South Africa

All Saints Hospital is a Provincial government funded hospital in Ngcobo, Eastern Cape in South Africa. Situated in Ngcobo, around 80km from Mthatha, the hospital serves the entire Ngcobo and some of the Cofimvaba community of over 148 000 people.

The hospital departments include Emergency department, Paediatric ward, Maternity ward, Gynaecology Services, Out Patients Department, Surgical Services, Medical Services, Operating Theatre & CSSD Services, Pharmacy, Anti-Retroviral (ARV) treatment for HIV/AIDS, Post Trauma Counseling Services, Physiotherapy, Occupational Therapy Services, Audiology and Speech Therapy Services Laboratory Services, X-ray Services, Laundry Services, Kitchen Services and Mortuary.

== Infrastructure ==
The All Saints Hospital has relied on the Xuka river nearby for its water supply since 1967. Water has been pumped from the river to a water treatment dam from where two pumps transfer it to the hospital’s water tanks.

The water pumps that were initially installed in 1967 had not been replaced until January 2011 when a pipe burst—halting the water supply and resulting in water being delivered to the hospital in trucks. Early in 2017, many community members in need of healthcare were turned away. Several patients also had to be sent to other hospitals in Umtata, Cofimvaba and Queenstown when the water supply was interrupted again by another pipe burst.

As one of only two government hospitals in the rural Eastern Cape in Ngcobo, the hospital often admits young, male patients who are injured during botched traditional circumcisions. As a common practice in Xhosa culture, young men undergo traditional circumcisions during initiation rituals in the Eastern Cape. During every initiation season, reports are made of advanced infections, severe blood loss, mutilation and even death. In December 2011, the All Saints was flooded with injured initiates with 33 of those admitted into wards requiring specialised care which put pressure on day-to-day operations.

== Education ==
The Lilitha College of Nursing, established by the Education and Training of Nurses and Midwives Act 4 of 2003, offers education and training for nurses and prospective nurses throughout the campuses in the Eastern Cape. The college is a single nursing college made up of five main campuses and nineteen sub campuses, one of which is on the All Saints Hospital’s grounds. The students are often sent on outreach programmes throughout surrounding communities as part of the school’s Community Based Education programme.
