= Empilisweni District Hospital =

- Eastern Cape Department of Health

Geography
- Location: Sterkspruit, Joe Gqabi District Municipality, Eastern Cape, South Africa
- Coordinates: 30°31′57″S 27°22′27″E

Organisation
- Care system: Public
- Type: District

Services
- Emergency department: Yes
- Beds: 98

Links
- Website: Eastern Cape Department of Health website - Joe Gqabi District Hospitals
- Other links: List of hospitals in South Africa

Empilisweni District Hospital is a Provincial government funded hospital for the Senqu Local Municipality area in Sterkspruit, Eastern Cape in South Africa. Empilisweni is a level 1 hospital situated near the Lesotho and Free State borders with 93 usable beds. It forms a cluster with Umlamli Hospital, Lady Grey and Cloete Joubert Hospitals.

The population served by the hospital numbers 144,450.

The hospital departments include Emergency department, Maternity ward, Out Patients Department, Surgical Services, Medical Services, Pharmacy, Anti-Retroviral (ARV) treatment for HIV/AIDS, Oral Health Care Provides, Physiotherapy, Occupational therapy, Dietetics, Laundry Services, Kitchen Services and Mortuary.

Starting July 2011, Broadreach Healthcare - an NGO assisting the South African National Department of Health in the management and treatment of HIV/AIDS in rural populations - built a comprehensive ARV site on the hospital grounds using donor funding; it became fully operational since March 2012.

== History ==
Empilisweni was a donation from the Dutch Reformed Church in 1976. The hospital was built in 1933 utilising muddy bricks with little accommodation for church ministers only and recently cannot cope with the appointment of enough skilled professionals needed for the institution. The buildings were old and falling with outdated plumbing, old wiring, leaking of water systems and old drainage.
