= Elizabeth Donkin Hospital =

- Eastern Cape Department of Health

Geography
- Location: Port Elizabeth, Eastern Cape, South Africa
- Coordinates: 33°58′52″S 25°37′56″E

Organisation
- Care system: Specialiazed
- Type: Psychiatric

Services
- Emergency department: No

Links
- Website: Elizabeth Donkin Hospital
- Other links: List of hospitals in South Africa

Elizabeth Donkin Hospital is a government funded Psychiatric hospital and Rehabilitation Centre situated in Port Elizabeth, Eastern Cape in South Africa.

The hospital departments include a Rehabilitation Centre, Pharmacy, Anti-Retroviral (ARV) treatment for HIV/AIDS, Post Trauma Counseling Services, Occupational Services, Laundry Services, Kitchen Services and Mortuary.
