= Mount Ayliff Hospital =

- Eastern Cape Department of Health

Geography
- Location: Mount Ayliff, Eastern Cape, South Africa
- Coordinates: 30°48′54″S 29°21′54″E

Organisation
- Care system: Public
- Type: Community

Services
- Emergency department: Yes

Links
- Website: Mount Ayliff Hospital
- Other links: List of hospitals in South Africa

Mount Ayliff Hospital is a Provincial government funded hospital in Mount Ayliff in the Alfred Nzo District of the Eastern Cape Province of South Africa.

The hospital departments include Audiology, Emergency department, Paediatric ward, Maternity ward, Out Patients Department, Surgical Services, Medical Services, Operating Theatre & CSSD Services, Dentistry, Ophthalmology, Pharmacy, Anti-Retroviral (ARV) treatment for HIV/AIDS, Post Trauma Counseling Services, Termination of Pregnancy Services, X-ray Services, Physiotherapy, Occupational Health Services, Laundry, Kitchen Services and Mortuary.
