= Zuid-Afrikaans Hospital =

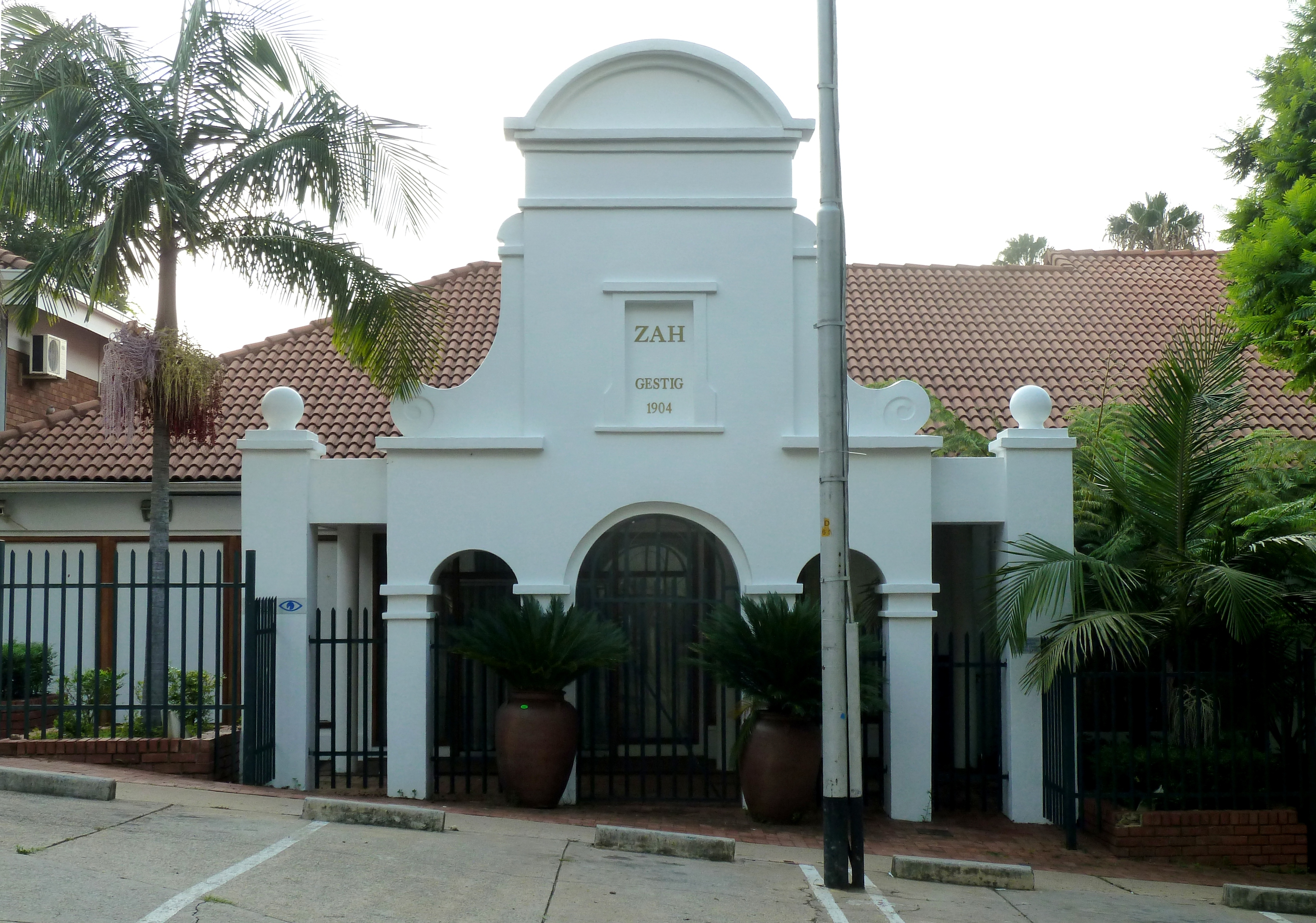

Geography
- Location: Pretoria, South Africa
- Coordinates: 25°45′44″S 28°12′22″E

Organisation
- Care system: Private

History
- Founded: 1904

Links
- Website: http://www.zah.co.za/
- Lists: Hospitals in South Africa

Zuid-Afrikaans Hospital (Afrikaans: Het Zuid-Afrikaans Hospitaal en Diakonessenhuis) is a private, non-profit hospital in Muckleneuk, Pretoria, South Africa, where the working language is both English and Afrikaans.

== Notable awards ==
Zuid-Afrikaans Hospital was voted one of the top 20 hospitals in South Africa by Discovery Health in their annual hospital survey for 2017, 2016 as well as 2014.
