= Bhisho Provincial Hospital =

- Eastern Cape Department of Health

Geography
- Location: Bhisho, Buffalo City Metropolitan Municipality, Eastern Cape, South Africa
- Coordinates: 32°49′40″S 27°27′18″E

Organisation
- Care system: Public
- Type: Community

Services
- Emergency department: Yes
- Beds: 205

History
- Opened: 1991

Links
- Website: Eastern Cape Department of Health website - Amathole District Hospitals
- Other links: List of hospitals in South Africa

Bhisho Provincial Hospital is a Provincial government funded hospital in Bhisho, Eastern Cape in South Africa.

The hospital departments include Emergency department, Paediatric ward, Maternity ward, Gynaecology Services, Out Patients Department, Surgical Services, Medical Services, Operating Theatre & CSSD Services, Pharmacy, Anti-Retroviral (ARV) treatment for HIV/AIDS, Post Trauma Counseling Services, Physiotherapy, Occupational Services, Laboratory Services, X-ray Services, Laundry Services, Kitchen Services and Mortuary.
