= Mary Malahlela =

South African doctor (1916–1981)

Mary Susan Makobatjatji Malahlela-Xakana
- Born: 2 May 1916; Pietersburg
- Died: 8 May 1981 (aged 65)
- Education: University of Fort Hare; University of the Witwatersrand
- Known for: First Black African woman medical doctor in South Africa
- Awards: Order of the Baobab
- Scientific career
- Fields: Medicine

Mary Malahlela-Xakana (2 May 1916 – 8 May 1981) was the first Black woman to register as a medical doctor in South Africa (in 1947). She was also a founding member of the Young Women’s Christian Association.

== Early life and education ==
Mary Susan Makobatjatji Malahlela was born in Pietersburg. Her father was Thadius Chweu Malahlela, a Christian convert. Her father had been driven from his home for refusing to put his twin children to death, since twins were considered a curse. As a girl she was a student at the Methodist Primary School in Juliwe, near Johannesburg. She attended the University of Fort Hare as an undergraduate, and in 1941 received support from the Native Trust Fund to study medicine at the University of Witwatersrand. When she graduated in 1947, she was the first Black woman to graduate from Wits. In 2015 the University of Witwatersrand erected a plaque on its grounds as a memorial to Dr Malahlela and as a way to redress the historical diminution of native black alumni.

== Career ==
In 1947, Malahlela graduated from medical school and registered as a medical doctor, the first black woman in South Africa to do so. She opened a private medical practice in Kliptown, and a second in Mofolo South. After the Group Areas Act, she worked at the clinic in Dobsonville.

Malahlele was a founding member of the YWCA in South Africa, and active in the peace and anti-apartheid movements. She was a member of the Women's Peace Movement, a member of the Fort Hare University Council, and a chairwoman of the Roodepoort School Board.

== Personal life ==
Mary Malahlela married and had two daughters. She died in 1981, aged 65, after a heart attack, while volunteering with Nthato Motlana at the rural Witkoppen Clinic in Sandton, Johannesburg.

A primary school in Dobsonville is named after Malahlela-Xakana. In 2015, Malahlela-Xakana was posthumously awarded the Order of the Baobab for her pioneering medical career.
