= Settlers Hospital =

- Eastern Cape Department of Health

Geography
- Location: Makhanda, Eastern Cape, South Africa
- Coordinates: 33°18′08″S 26°30′55″E

Organisation
- Care system: Public
- Type: Community

Services
- Emergency department: Yes
- Beds: 178

History
- Opened: 1922

Links
- Website: Eastern Cape Department of Health website - Cacadu District Hospitals
- Other links: List of hospitals in South Africa

Settlers Hospital is a Provincial government funded hospital for the Makana Local Municipality area in Grahamstown, Eastern Cape in South Africa.

The hospital departments include Emergency department, Paediatric ward, Maternity ward, Gynaecology Services, Out Patients Department, Surgical Services, Medical Services, Operating Theatre & CSSD Services, Pharmacy, Anti-Retroviral (ARV) treatment for HIV/AIDS, Post Trauma Counseling Services, Occupational Services, X-ray Services, Physiotherapy, NHLS Laboratory, Laundry Services, Kitchen Services and Mortuary.
