= Nelson Mandela Academic Hospital =

- Eastern Cape Department of Health

Geography
- Location: Mthatha, King Sabata Dalindyebo Local Municipality, OR Tambo District Municipality, Eastern Cape, South Africa
- Coordinates: 31°35′15″S 28°45′51″E

Organisation
- Care system: Public
- Type: Tertiary Specialist, Teaching
- Affiliated university: Walter Sisulu University

Services
- Emergency department: Yes

Links
- Website: Nelson Mandela Academic Hospital
- Lists: Hospitals in South Africa
- Other links: List of hospitals in South Africa

Nelson Mandela Academic Hospital is a large Provincial government funded district general hospital situated in central Mthatha in South Africa. It is a tertiary teaching hospital and forms part of the Mthatha Hospital Complex.

The hospital departments include Emergency department, Paediatric ward, Maternity ward, Obstetrics/Gynecology, Out Patients Department, Surgical Services, Medical Services, Operating Theatre & CSSD Services, Pharmacy, Anti-Retroviral (ARV) treatment for HIV/AIDS, Post Trauma Counseling Services, Ophthalmology Out-patients Clinic, Occupational Services, X-ray Services, Physiotherapy, NHLS Laboratory, Oral Health Care Provides, Laundry Services, Kitchen Services and Mortuary.
