= Bambisana Hospital =

- Eastern Cape Dept of Health

Geography
- Location: Lusikisiki, OR Tambo District Municipality, Eastern Cape, South Africa
- Coordinates: 31°21′50″S 29°34′40″E

Organisation
- Care system: Public
- Type: Community

Services
- Emergency department: Yes
- Beds: 130

Links
- Website: http://www.ecdoh.gov.za/
- Other links: List of hospitals in South Africa

Bambisana Hospital is a Provincial government funded hospital in Lusikisiki, Eastern Cape in South Africa. Bambisana Hospital is a secondary level hospital. It is a referral hospital for the surrounding area, meaning it receives patients referred from smaller primary care facilities like district hospitals. Bambisana does not provide primary healthcare services directly, but rather focuses on providing a higher level of care for patients referred to it.

The hospital departments include Emergency department 24/7, Paediatric ward, Maternity ward, Gynaecology Services, Out Patients Department, Surgical Services, Medical Services, Operating Theatre & CSSD Services, Pharmacy, Anti-Retroviral (ARV) treatment for HIV/AIDS, Post Trauma Counseling Services, Physiotherapy, Occupational Services, Laboratory Services, X-ray Services, Laundry Services, Kitchen Services and Mortuary.
