= Andries Vosloo Hospital =

- Eastern Cape Department of Health

Geography
- Location: Somerset East, Sarah Baartman District Municipality, Eastern Cape, South Africa
- Coordinates: 32°43′58″S 25°35′27″E

Organisation
- Care system: Public
- Type: Community

Services
- Emergency department: Yes

Links
- Website: Andries Vosloo Hospital
- Lists: Hospitals in South Africa
- Other links: List of hospitals in South Africa

Andries Vosloo Hospital is a Provincial government funded hospital for the Blue Crane Route Local Municipality area in Somerset East, Eastern Cape in South Africa.

The hospital departments include Emergency department, Paediatric ward, Maternity ward, Surgical Services, Medical Services, Operating Theatre & CSSD Services, Pharmacy, Anti-Retroviral (ARV) treatment for HIV/AIDS, Post Trauma Counseling Services, X-ray Services, Physiotherapy, NHLS Laboratory, Oral Health Care Provides, Physiotherapy, Laundry Services, Kitchen Services and Mortuary.
