= Cathcart Provincial Hospital =

- Eastern Cape Department of Health

Geography
- Location: Cathcart, Amathole District Municipality, Eastern Cape, South Africa
- Coordinates: 32°17′55″S 27°08′11″E

Organisation
- Care system: Public
- Type: Community

Services
- Emergency department: Yes

Links
- Website: Eastern Cape Department of Health website - Amathole District Hospitals
- Other links: List of hospitals in South Africa

Cathcart Hospital is a Provincial government funded hospital in Cathcart, Eastern Cape in South Africa.

The hospital departments include Emergency department, Paediatric ward, Maternity ward, Surgical Services, Medical Services, Operating Theatre & CSSD Services, Pharmacy, Anti-Retroviral (ARV) treatment for HIV/AIDS, Laundry Services, Kitchen Services and Mortuary.
