= Bedford Orthopedic Hospital =

- Eastern Cape Dept of Health

Geography
- Location: Mthatha, King Sabata Dalindyebo Local Municipality, OR Tambo District Municipality, Eastern Cape, South Africa
- Coordinates: 31°33′59″S 28°42′54″E

Organisation
- Care system: Public
- Type: Orthopedic

Services
- Emergency department: No

Links
- Website: Bedford Orthopaedic Hospital
- Other links: List of hospitals in South Africa

Bedford Orthopedic Hospital is a Provincial government funded Orthopedic hospital in Mthatha, Eastern Cape in South Africa.

The hospital departments include Out Patients Department, Surgical Services, Operating Theatre & CSSD Services, Pharmacy, Physiotherapy, Radiology, Occupational Services, Laundry Services, and Kitchen Services.
