= Madzikane Ka Zulu Memorial Hospital =

- Eastern Cape Department of Health

Geography
- Location: Mount Frere, Eastern Cape, South Africa
- Coordinates: 30°52′56″S 29°00′16″E

Organisation
- Care system: Public
- Type: Community

Services
- Emergency department: Yes

Links
- Website: Madzikane Ka Zulu Memorial Hospital
- Other links: List of hospitals in South Africa

Madzikane Ka Zulu Memorial Hospital is a Provincial government funded community hospital in Mount Frere in the Alfred Nzo District of the Eastern Cape province of South Africa. It is situated just a few kilometres north of Mount Frere town on the N2 road. It is a landmark in the area, being one of the largest hospitals in the province.

The hospital departments include Emergency department, Paediatric ward, Gynecology and Maternity ward, Out Patients Department (OPD), Surgical Services, Medical Services, Operating Theatre & CSSD Services, Laboratory, Pharmacy, Anti-Retroviral (ARV) treatment for HIV/AIDS, Post Trauma Counselling Services, Termination of Pregnancy Services, X-ray Services, Physiotherapy, Occupational Health Services, Laundry, Kitchen Services and Mortuary.
