= Leratong Hospital =

Geography
- Location: Mogale City, Krugersdorp, South Africa
- Coordinates: 26.17229°S 27.805377°E

Links
- Lists: Hospitals in South Africa

Leratong Hospital is a hospital in Kagiso in Mogale City, Krugersdorp, South Africa. The hospital won numerous awards including one for being "baby-friendly".

== Coat of arms ==
The hospital registered a coat of arms at the Bureau of Heraldry in 1982 : Gules, on a sixteen-pointed star Argent, a cross potent fitchy at the foot Vert, ensigned with an antique lamp Azure, enflamed Gules. The arms were designed by Dr J.B.M. Botha.
