= Burgersdorp Provincial Hospital =

- Eastern Cape Department of Health

Geography
- Location: Burgersdorp, Joe Gqabi District Municipality, Eastern Cape, South Africa
- Coordinates: 30°59′38″S 26°18′51″E

Organisation
- Care system: Public
- Type: Community

Services
- Emergency department: Yes
- Beds: 24

Links
- Website: Eastern Cape Department of Health website - Joe Gqabi District Hospitals
- Other links: List of hospitals in South Africa

Burgersdorp Hospital is a Provincial government funded hospital for the Walter Sisulu Local Municipality area in Burgersdorp, Eastern Cape in South Africa.

The hospital departments include Emergency department, Maternity ward, Out Patients Department, Surgical Services, Medical Services, Operating Theatre & CSSD Services, Pharmacy, Anti-Retroviral (ARV) treatment for HIV/AIDS, Post Trauma Counseling Services, X-ray Services, Physiotherapy, Oral Health Care Provides, Laundry Services, Kitchen Services and Mortuary.
