= Midlands Provincial Hospital =

- Eastern Cape Department of Health

Geography
- Location: Graaff-Reinet, Sarah Baartman District Municipality, Eastern Cape, South Africa
- Coordinates: 32°15′30″S 24°32′19″E

Organisation
- Care system: Public
- Type: Community

Services
- Emergency department: Yes

Links
- Website: www.echealth.gov.za?page_id=32
- Lists: Hospitals in South Africa

Midlands Provincial Hospital is a Provincial government funded hospital in the Dr Beyers Naudé Local Municipality area in Graaff-Reinet in South Africa.

The hospital departments include Emergency department, Paediatric ward, Maternity ward, Obstetrics, Gynaecology Services, Out Patients Department, Surgical Services, Medical Services, Operating Theatre & CSSD Services, Pharmacy, Anti-Retroviral (ARV) treatment for HIV/AIDS, Post Trauma Counseling Services, Dentistry, Physiotherapy, Occupational Services, Laboratory Services, X-ray Services, Laundry Services and Kitchen Services.
