= Umlamli Hospital =

- Eastern Cape Dept of Health

Geography
- Location: near Sterkspruit, Joe Gqabi District Municipality, Eastern Cape, South Africa
- Coordinates: 30°32′59″S 27°27′57″E

Organisation
- Care system: Public
- Type: community

Services
- Emergency department: Yes
- Beds: 74

Links
- Website: Eastern Cape Department of Health website - Joe Gqabi District Hospitals
- Other links: List of hospitals in South Africa

Umlamli Hospital is a Provincial government funded community hospital for the Senqu Local Municipality area in Sterkspruit, Eastern Cape in South Africa. It is situated near the Lesotho and Free State borders with 74 usable beds. It forms a cluster with Empilisweni, Lady Grey and Cloete Joubert Hospital

The hospital handles mostly chronic cases like TB and HIV/AIDS. Other departments include Emergency department, Maternity ward, Out Patients Department, Surgical Services, Medical Services, Pharmacy, Anti-Retroviral (ARV) treatment for HIV/AIDS, Physiotherapy, Laundry Services, Kitchen Services and Mortuary.

The hospital's branch of the Ilitha College serves as a training institution for nurses, and a proofing ground for junior doctors, pharmacists and physiotherapists, since it draws a large workforce from the surrounding villages.

== History ==
The hospital was founded in 1933 by the Roman Catholic Mission Society with his first director Hans Pattis (1897–1933) from Bozen and became a Transkei state institution in 1976.
