= St. Elizabeth Medical Center =

St. Elizabeth Medical Center may refer to:

- St. Elizabeth's Medical Center (Boston) in Boston, Massachusetts
- St. Elizabeth Medical Center North in Covington, Kentucky
- St. Elizabeth Medical Center South in Edgewood, Kentucky
- St. Elizabeth Medical Center Grant County in Williamstown, Kentucky, see List of hospitals in Kentucky
- St. Elizabeth Medical Center (Utica) in Utica, New York
- St. Elizabeth's Medical Center (Wabasha) in Wabasha, Minnesota
- St. Elizabeth Regional Medical Center in Lincoln, Nebraska
- Franciscan Health Lafayette Central, formerly St. Elizabeth Medical Center, in Lafayette, Indiana

== See also ==
- St. Elizabeth Hospital (disambiguation)
