= Aliwal North Hospital =

- Eastern Cape Department of Health

Geography
- Location: Aliwal North, Joe Gqabi District Municipality, Eastern Cape, South Africa
- Coordinates: 30°41′52″S 26°42′27″E

Organisation
- Care system: Public
- Type: Community

Services
- Emergency department: Yes
- Beds: 48

Links
- Website: Eastern Cape Department of Health website - Joe Gqabi District Hospitals
- Lists: Hospitals in South Africa
- Other links: List of hospitals in South Africa

Aliwal North Hospital is a 50-bed government funded District hospital that renders level 1 care to patients in the catchment area of the Walter Sisulu Local Municipality in Aliwal North, Eastern Cape in South Africa.

Aliwal North is situated on the N6 between East London and Bloemfontein to its north. The Aliwal North hospital is situated in Park Lane, just off the main road (Somerset Street) leading through town to Jamestown and neighboured by the Aliwal North High School and its hostels on the southern end of the town. Aliwal North Hospital serves a population estimated at 43 000.

The hospital departments include Emergency department, Paediatric ward, Gynecology and Maternity wards, Surgical Services, Medical Services, Operating Theatre and CSSD Services, Forensic Pathological Services, Pharmacy, Anti-Retroviral (ARV) treatment for HIV/AIDS, Post Trauma Counseling Services, X-ray Services, Physiotherapy, NHLS Laboratory, Oral Health Care Provides, Physiotherapy, Laundry Services, Kitchen Services and Mortuary.
