= Nelson Mandela Children's Hospital =

Nelson Mandela Children’s Hospital
- Shown in Johannesburg

Geography
- Location: Parktown, Johannesburg, Gauteng, South Africa
- Coordinates: 26.179142°S 28.039186°E

Organisation
- Care system: Department of Health
- Type: Specialist
- Affiliated university: University of Witwatersrand

Services
- Speciality: Paediatrics

Links
- Website: www.nelsonmandelachildrenshospital.org
- Lists: Hospitals in South Africa

Nelson Mandela Children’s Hospital (NMCH) is the only dedicated children’s hospital in Gauteng. Located in Parktown, Johannesburg, NMCH is a specialised tertiary referral hospital providing advanced paediatric care for babies, children and adolescents. The hospital treats patients from Gauteng, surrounding provinces and across the SADC region. Operating as a non-profit organisation, NMCH serves both publicly funded and privately funded patients across a range of specialised paediatric clinical services.

Nelson Mandela Children's Hospital in Johannesburg, South Africa, named after Nelson Mandela is a children's hospital constructed since 2014 and opened in 2017.
