= Lady Grey Hospital =

- Eastern Cape Department of Health

Geography
- Location: Lady Grey, Joe Gqabi District Municipality, Eastern Cape, South Africa
- Coordinates: 30°42′46″S 27°12′43″E

Organisation
- Care system: Public
- Type: Community

Services
- Emergency department: Yes
- Beds: 30

Links
- Website: Eastern Cape Department of Health website - Joe Gqabi District Hospitals
- Other links: List of hospitals in South Africa

Lady Grey Hospital is a Provincial government funded hospital for the Senqu Local Municipality area in Lady Grey, Eastern Cape in South Africa. It was previously a (private) Provincially Aided Hospital.

The hospital forms a cluster with Empilisweni, Umlamli and Cloete Joubert Hospitals. It is conveniently situated near the farm population it serves, and also handles quite a number of motor vehicle accident (traffic collision) victims, as it is situated next to the busy R58 road linking the east to the west of the North Eastern Cape.

The hospital departments include Emergency department, Gynecology, Maternity and Paediatrics wards, Surgical Services, Medical Services, Operating Theatre & CSSD Services, Pharmacy, Anti-Retroviral (ARV) treatment for HIV/AIDS, Post Trauma Counseling Services, Laundry Services, Kitchen Services and Mortuary.

During May to July 2012, the Donald Woods Foundation - an NGO assisting the South African National Department of Health in the management and treatment of HIV/AIDS in rural populations - built a comprehensive ARV-site on the hospital grounds using donor funding; it is fully operational since September 2012.
