= Edendale Hospital =

Harry Gwala Regional Hospital
- KwaZulu-Natal Department of Health

Geography
- Location: 89 Selby Msimang Rd, Plessislaer, Edendale, Umgungundlovu, KwaZulu-Natal, South Africa
- Coordinates: 29°38′50″S 30°19′55″E

Services
- Beds: 1,275

History
- Opened: 1954

Links
- Website: www.kznhealth.gov.za/edendalehospital.htm
- Lists: Hospitals in South Africa

Harry Gwala Regional Hospital (formerly Edendale Hospital), established in 1954, is a 1,275- bed regional and district hospital in Edendale near Pietermaritzburg, KwaZulu-Natal (KZN), South Africa, operated by the KZN Department of Health.

Edendale is a teaching hospital — a satellite campus for the Nelson R. Mandela School of Medicine (since 2000). It forms part of the Pietermaritzburg Metropolitan Hospital Complex which includes Grey's Hospital.

The hospital offers services in Internal Medicine, General Surgery, Paediatrics, Orthopaedics, Obstetrics and Gynaecology, Ophthalmology, Psychiatry, and Intensive Care. Rehabilitation services include Occupational therapy, Physiotherapy, and Speech therapy.
