= Adelaide Provincial Hospital (Eastern Cape) =

- Eastern Cape Department of Health

Geography
- Location: Adelaide, Raymond Mhlaba Local Municipality, Eastern Cape, South Africa
- Coordinates: 32°42′01″S 26°17′40″E

Organisation
- Care system: Public
- Type: Community

Services
- Emergency department: Yes
- Beds: 60

Links
- Website: Eastern Cape Department of Health website - Amathole District Hospitals
- Lists: Hospitals in South Africa
- Other links: List of hospitals in South Africa

Adelaide Provincial Hospital is a provincial government-funded hospital for the Nxuba Local Municipality area in Adelaide, Eastern Cape in South Africa. It used to be a (private) Provincially Aided Hospital.

The hospital departments include Emergency department, Paediatric ward, Gynecology and Maternity ward, Out Patients Department, Surgical Services, Medical Services, Operating Theatre & Central Sterile Services Department Services, Pharmacy, Anti-Retroviral (ARV) treatment for HIV/AIDS, Post Trauma Counseling Services, X-ray Services, Laundry Services, Kitchen Services and Mortuary.
