= Denmar Psychiatric Hospital =

- Denmar Specialist Psychiatric Hospital (Pty) Ltd.

Geography
- Location: Garsfontein, Pretoria, Gauteng, South Africa
- Coordinates: 25°46′15″S 28°13′00″E

Organisation
- Care system: Private
- Type: Psychiatric
- Affiliated university: None

Services
- Beds: 170

History
- Opened: 1951

Links
- Website: http://www.denmar.co.za/

Denmar Psychiatric Hospital is a private psychiatric hospital situated in the east of Pretoria.

== History ==
Denmar was established in 1951 and was the first private psychiatric hospital in Pretoria. It started as an 18-bed facility.

== Facilities ==
- 170 Beds
- Theater and day clinic
- 24h admissions
- 27 Psychiatrists
- Occupational Therapy
- Clinical Psychologists
- Pharmacy
- Physiotherapist
- Visiting pastors and chaplains
- Arts and Crafts facilities
