= Fort England Psychiatric Hospital =

- Eastern Cape Dept of Health

Geography
- Location: Makhanda, Eastern Cape, South Africa
- Coordinates: 33°18′56″S 26°32′25″E

Organisation
- Care system: Specialiazed
- Type: Psychiatric

Services
- Emergency department: No

Links
- Website: http://www.ecdoh.gov.za/hospitals/21/Fort_England_Hospital
- Other links: List of hospitals in South Africa

Fort England Psychiatric Hospital is a government-funded psychiatric hospital and drug rehabilitation centre for the Makana Local Municipality area in Makhanda, Eastern Cape in South Africa.

The hospital departments include a Rehabilitation Centre, pharmacy, Anti-Retroviral (ARV) treatment for HIV/AIDS, Post Trauma Counseling Services, Laundry Services, and Kitchen Services.

== Coat of arms ==
The hospital registered a coat of arms at the Bureau of Heraldry in 1975: On a hurt [blue disc], within a double tressure Argent [silver], a fess Argent charged with a chain of nine links Sable [black], the middle link rompu [broken], between in chief an antique lamp enflamed and in base a window Or [gold], set in a wall between two pillars, all Argent. Mrs. Els designed the arms.
