= Port Elizabeth Provincial Hospital =

- Eastern Cape Department of Health

Geography
- Location: Port Elizabeth, Eastern Cape, South Africa
- Coordinates: 33°57′30″S 25°35′57″E

Organisation
- Care system: Public
- Type: Tertiary
- Affiliated university: Nelson Mandela Metropolitan University

Services
- Emergency department: No

Links
- Website: www.ecdoh.gov.za/hospitals
- Lists: Hospitals in South Africa

Port Elizabeth Provincial Hospital is a large Provincial government funded hospital situated in central Port Elizabeth in South Africa. It is a tertiary teaching hospital and forms part of the Port Elizabeth Hospital Complex.

The hospital's clinic was built in 1928. It was closed temporarily in February 2024 to begin an extended renovations project that involved removing asbestos.

The hospital opened an acute psychiatric unit in November 2019 after years of delays.

The hospital departments include Emergency department, Paediatric ward, Maternity ward, Obstetrics/Gynecology, Out Patients Department, Surgical Services, Medical Services, Operating Theatre & CSSD Services, Pharmacy, Anti-Retroviral (ARV) treatment for HIV/AIDS, Post Trauma Counseling Services, Ophthalmology Out-patients Clinic, Occupational Services, X-ray Services, Physiotherapy, NHLS Laboratory, Oral Health Care Provides, Laundry Services, Kitchen Services and Mortuary.
