= Life Groenkloof Hospital =

- Life Healthcare

Geography
- Location: Groenkloof, Pretoria, Gauteng, South Africa
- Coordinates: 25°46′15″S 28°13′00″E

Organisation
- Care system: Private
- Type: Community
- Affiliated university: None

Services
- Beds: 214

History
- Opened: 1957

Links
- Website: http://www.lifehealthcare.co.za/
- Other links: List of hospitals in South Africa

Life Groenkloof Hospital (previously Little Company of Mary) is a private hospital in Pretoria, South Africa. It is situated in Groenkloof, a leafy suburb south east of the city centre. It was opened to the public in 1957.

The hospital is part of the Life Healthcare group, and features a state of the art stroke unit run by Dr W. Duim (Neurologist).

Medical and surgical disciplines include: Dermatology, ENT surgery, Endocrinology, General surgery, Gynaecology, Internal medicine/Physicians, Neurology, Neuro and Spinal surgery, Oncology, Orthopaedic surgery, Pathology, Plastic and Reconstructive surgery, Paediatric Endocrinology, Paediatric Oncology, Paediatric Pulmonology, Psychiatry, Nuclear medicine, Radiology (including CT scanner, PET scanner, bone densitometry, mammography, MRI and x-rays), Radiotherapy, Radiosurgery, Urology,

Ancillary services: Audio and speech therapy, Dietetics, Lung function laboratory, Orthotics and prosthesis services, Physiotherapy, Retail pharmacy,
