= Witkoppen Clinic =

Non-profit community healthcare center

Coordinates: 26.0110°S 28.0108°E

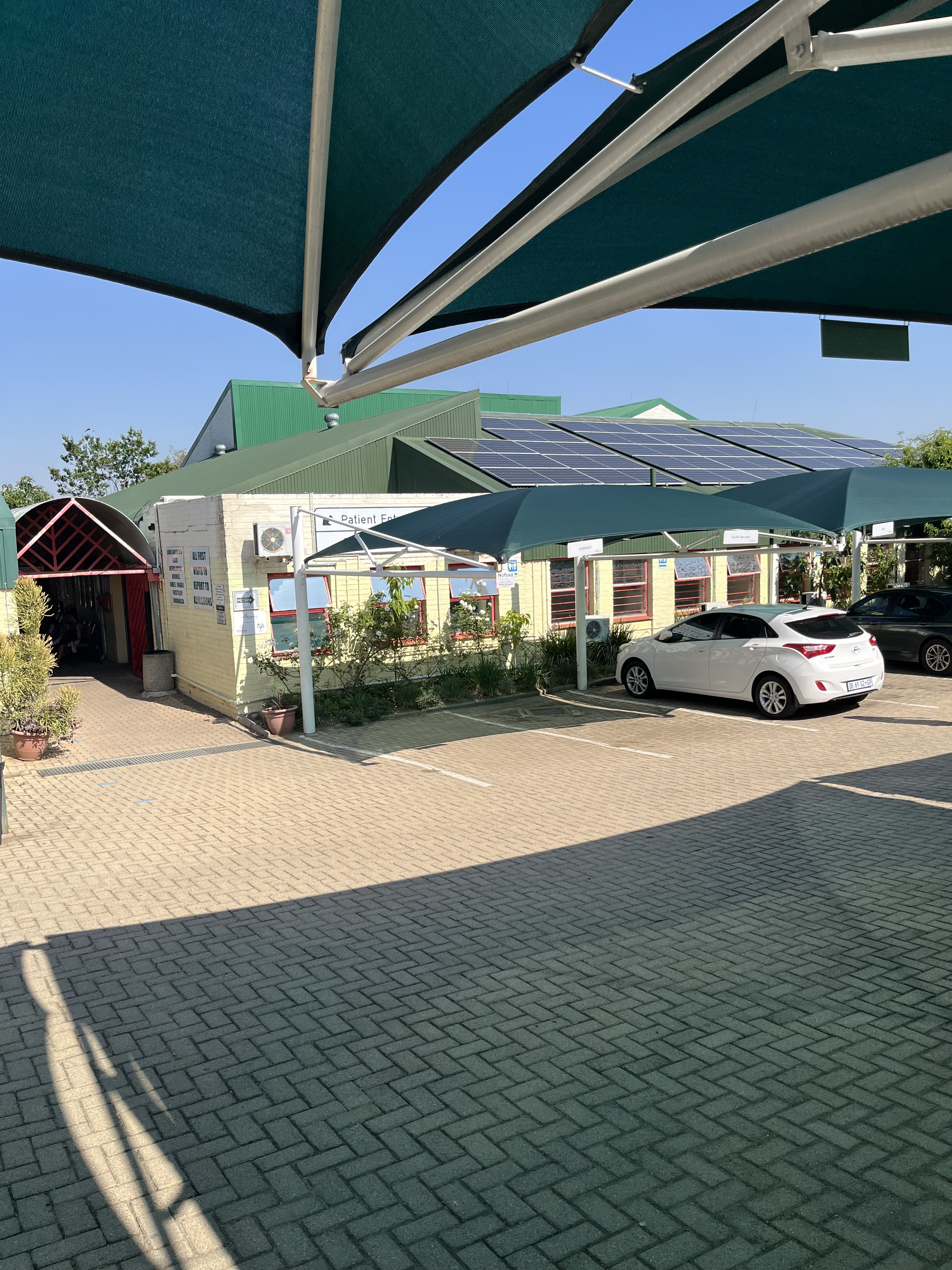
Entrance to the Witkoppen Clinic.

The Witkoppen Health and Welfare Centre, often referred to simply as Witkoppen Clinic, is a non-profit community healthcare center located in Fourways, Johannesburg, South Africa. The clinic began in 1946 and provides a wide range of primary healthcare services to communities around Sandton and Diepsloot.

Witkoppen Clinic is widely recognized for its innovative approaches to healthcare delivery in resource-limited settings for its work in combating HIV/AIDS, promoting maternal health, and addressing the social determinants of health in underprivileged communities.

== History ==
The Witkoppen Clinic was founded in the 1940s as a small rural health service, responding to the needs of marginalized populations who lacked access to formal healthcare facilities. Over the years, it has evolved into a full-service clinic with a strong emphasis on providing holistic care. Its growth has been supported by partnerships with government agencies, non-governmental organizations, and international donors, all united in addressing the pressing health disparities in South Africa.

In 1981 Dr Mary Susan Malahlela who was the first black female to register as a medical doctor in South Africa collapsed and died aged 65, after a heart attack while volunteering with Dr. Nthato Motlana at Witkoppen Clinic.
