= Embhuleni Hospital =

District hospital in South Africa

- Department of Health in Mpumalanga

Geography
- Location: Stand 40, Main Road, Elukwatini-B, Chief Albert Luthuli Local Municipality, Gert Sibande District Municipality, Mpumalanga, South Africa
- Coordinates: 26.0478°S 30.8166°E

Organisation
- Type: District hospital

Services
- Beds: 189

Links
- Website: mpg.gov.za

Embhuleni Hospital is a public healthcare facility located in Nhlazatshe (Elukwatini), Chief Albert Luthuli Local Municipality of Mpumalanga, South Africa. It operates under the Department of Health in Mpumalanga and serves the surrounding rural and semi-rural communities of the Gert Sibande District Municipality.

== Overview ==
The hospital is situated at Stand 40, Main Road, Elukwatini-B, and functions as a district-level facility offering 24-hour inpatient and outpatient services. It is part of the Albert Luthuli sub-district health system and plays a key role in the delivery of essential healthcare services in Mpumalanga's eastern highlands near the border of Eswatini. It was built in the 1980s and named after the Embhuleni royal residence in Badplaas.

According to the 2011 District Hospital Performance Assessment Report for Mpumalanga, Embhuleni Hospital had a total of 189 beds and maintained an average length of stay of about 3.7 days. The hospital was managed by a chief executive officer, identified in official documents as Mr T. Mashaba.

A 2015 study on the hospital's antenatal programme highlighted barriers preventing women from returning for their CD4 count results, citing poor communication, stigma and service delays as major challenges.

On New Year's Day 2020, four babies were born at the hospital, with no maternal or neonatal deaths recorded (during an unspecified period before this date) — an event praised by the provincial health authorities as an indicator of improved maternal care.

Despite its essential role in regional healthcare, Embhuleni Hospital has faced operational and safety challenges over the years. In 2021, a general worker was arrested for allegedly raping a pregnant patient within the hospital premises.

In 2024, reports emerged of a 74-year-old woman whose surgery was delayed due to a shortage of available beds, highlighting the strain on hospital capacity.

A 2025 court ruling awarded a mother R540,000 after her child developed cerebral palsy due to medical negligence during childbirth at Embhuleni Hospital.
