= Lady Frere =

Town in Emalahleni Municipality

Lady Frere Cacadu
- Location within Eastern Cape Location within South Africa Location within Africa
- Coordinates: 31.703°S 27.234°E
- Country: South Africa
- Province: Eastern Cape
- District: Chris Hani
- Municipality: Emalahleni

Area
  - Total: 22.1 km^{2} (8.5 sq mi)

Population (2011)
  - Total: 4,024
  - Density: 182/km^{2} (472/sq mi)

Racial makeup (2011)
  - Black African: 98.3%
  - Coloured: 0.6%
  - Indian/Asian: 0.2%
  - White: 0.1%
  - Other: 0.6%

First languages (2011)
  - Xhosa: 91.6%
  - English: 4.1%
  - Other: 4.4%
- Time zone: UTC+2 (SAST)
- Postal code (street): 5410
- PO box: 5410
- Area code: 047

Lady Frere (officially Cacadu) is a small town in Chris Hani District Municipality in the Eastern Cape province of South Africa. The town was renamed to Cacadu in 2017 after changes to the country's colonial names. Cacadu, meaning "bulrush water", is the Xhosa name for the White Kei River, which rises in the district. It is one of the largest rural parts in the former Transkei.

== History ==
The town was established 1879, and became a municipality in 1900. The town was named after the wife of Sir Henry Bartle Frere, governor of the Cape Colony from 1877 to 1880.
