= Butterworth Hospital (Eastern Cape) =

- Eastern Cape Department of Health

Geography
- Location: Butterworth, Amathole District Municipality, Eastern Cape, South Africa
- Coordinates: 32°19′57″S 28°08′18″E

Organisation
- Care system: Public
- Type: Community

Services
- Emergency department: Yes

Links
- Website: Butterworth Hospital
- Other links: List of hospitals in South Africa

Butterworth Hospital is a district government funded hospital for the Mnquma Local Municipality area in Butterworth, Eastern Cape in South Africa.The hospital has a bed capacity of 350.

The hospital departments include Emergency department, Paediatric ward, Maternity ward, Obstetrics/Gynecology, Psychiatric Services, Out Patients Department, Surgical Services, Medical Services, Operating Theatre & CSSD Services, Ophthalmology, Pharmacy, Anti-Retroviral (ARV) treatment for HIV/AIDS, X-ray Services, Physiotherapy, NHLS Laboratory, Occupational Services, Oral Health Care Provides, Laundry Services, Kitchen Services and Mortuary.
