= Sakhisizwe Local Municipality =

Sakhisizwe
- Local municipality
- Seal

- Location in the Eastern Cape
- Coordinates: 30°55′S 26°41′E
- Country: South Africa
- Province: Eastern Cape
- District: Chris Hani
- Seat: Cala
- Wards: 9

Government
  - Type: Municipal council
  - Mayor: Buyiswa Ntsere (ANC)
  - Speaker: Kholiswa Faku (ANC)
  - Chief Whip: Andile Sondlo (ANC)

Area
  - Total: 2,355 km^{2} (909 sq mi)

Population (2011)
  - Total: 63,582
  - Density: 27.00/km^{2} (69.93/sq mi)

Racial makeup (2011)
  - Black African: 97.7%
  - Coloured: 0.8%
  - Indian/Asian: 0.2%
  - White: 1.1%

First languages (2011)
  - Xhosa: 92.2%
  - English: 2.7%
  - Afrikaans: 1.8%
  - Sign language: 1.2%
  - Other: 2.1%
- Time zone: UTC+2 (SAST)
- Municipal code: EC138

Sakhisizwe Municipality (Xhosa: uMasipala wase Sakhisizwe) is a local municipality within the Chris Hani District Municipality, in the Eastern Cape province of South Africa. Sakhisizwe is an isiXhosa word meaning "we are building the nation".

== Main places ==
The 2001 census divided the municipality into the following main places:

Place	Code	Area (km^{2})	Population
Cala Part 1	22501	23.10	11,479
Cala Part 2	22510	14.20	280
Ehlatini	22502	89.40	3,971
Elliot	22503	28.68	10,965
Engcobo	22504	20.85	1,422
Eqolombeni	22505	149.28	5,833
Masibambane	22506	0.44	4,123
Sidindi	22508	12.14	182
Xalanga	22509	215.01	11,546
Remainder of the municipality	22507	1,703.50	4,233

== Politics ==
The municipal council consists of seventeen members elected by mixed-member proportional representation. Nine councillors are elected by first-past-the-post voting in nine wards, while the remaining eight are chosen from party lists so that the total number of party representatives is proportional to the number of votes received. In the election of 1 November 2021 the African National Congress (ANC) won a majority of thirteen seats on the council. The following table shows the results of the election.

Party	Ward			List			Total seats
Party	Votes	%	Seats	Votes	%	Seats	Total seats
African National Congress	9,609	67.16	9	10,299	73.07	4	13
Democratic Alliance	1,097	7.67	0	1,238	8.78	2	2
Economic Freedom Fighters	935	6.53	0	1,034	7.34	1	1
Independent candidates	1,424	9.95	0				0
African Transformation Movement	473	3.31	0	484	3.43	1	1
United Democratic Movement	288	2.01	0	458	3.25	0	0
Pan Africanist Congress of Azania	185	1.29	0	313	2.22	0	0
Khowa Residents Association	175	1.22	0	269	1.91	0	0
Drakensberg Concerned Residents	122	0.85	0				0
Total	14,308	100.00	9	14,095	100.00	8	17
Valid votes	14,308	97.60		14,095	97.30		
Invalid/blank votes	352	2.40		391	2.70		
Total votes	14,660	100.00		14,486	100.00		
Registered voters/turnout	30,028	48.82		30,028	48.24		
