= Cala, South Africa =

Cala
- Location within Eastern Cape Location within South Africa
- Coordinates: 31.523°S 27.698°E
- Country: South Africa
- Province: Eastern Cape
- District: Chris Hani
- Municipality: Sakhisizwe

Area
  - Total: 46.60 km^{2} (17.99 sq mi)

Population (2011)
  - Total: 14,520
  - Density: 311.6/km^{2} (807.0/sq mi)

Racial makeup (2011)
  - Black African: 98.8%
  - Coloured: 0.3%
  - Indian/Asian: 0.3%
  - White: 0.2%
  - Other: 0.4%

First languages (2011)
  - Xhosa: 92.0%
  - English: 2.7%
  - Sign language: 1.3%
  - Other: 4.1%
- Time zone: UTC+2 (SAST)
- Postal code (street): 5455
- PO box: 5455
- Area code: 047

Cala is a town in Sakhisizwe Local Municipality, part of the Chris Hani District Municipality in the Eastern Cape province of South Africa.

The town is located on the Tsomo River, 28 km southwest of Elliot. The name is Xhosa for ‘adjacent to’, referring to its situation west of the Drakensberg, which here extends north and south.

== Notable people ==
The following people were born in Cala:

- Enoch Godongwana, trade unionist and politician
- Gwede Mantashe, trade unionist and politician
- Wiseman Lumkile Nkuhlu, chartered accountant
- Dumisa Ntsebeza, lawyer and activist
- Lungisile Ntsebeza, sociologist and activist
- Ama Qamata, actress
- Louis van Biljon, athlete
- Tembeka Ngcukaitobi, lawyer and legal scholar
