= Frere Hospital =

- Eastern Cape Dept of Health

Geography
- Location: Amalinda, East London, Eastern Cape, Eastern Cape, South Africa
- Coordinates: 32°59′47″S 27°53′28″E

Organisation
- Care system: Public
- Type: District General, Teaching
- Affiliated university: Lilitha Nursing College; Walter Sisulu University
- Patron: Henry Bartle Frere

Services
- Emergency department: Yes, Major Trauma Centre
- Beds: 910

History
- Founded: 7 September 1881; 144 years ago

Links
- Website: Frere Hospital
- Other links: List of hospitals in South Africa

Frere Hospital is a large government funded teaching hospital situated in East London, Eastern Cape in South Africa. It was established in 1881 and is a tertiary teaching hospital. Frere Hospital is named after Sir Henry Bartle Frere, Governor of the Cape Colony from 1877 to 1880.

== Departments and services ==
The hospital departments include Emergency and Trauma department, Orthopaedic surgery, Paediatrics, Obstetrics/Gynecology, Surgery, Internal Medicine, ARV clinic for HIV/AIDS in adults and children, Anaesthetics, Family Medicine, Oncology for adult and paediatric patients and burns unit.

Other specialties include Dermatology, Maxillofacial surgery, Neurosurgery, Paediatric Surgery, Ophthalmology, Otolaryngology (ENT) and Urology.

The facilities includes the following theatres: Operating Theatre, Endoscopy Theatre, Intensive Care Unit (ICU) for adult, paediatric and neonatal patients, high care wards for general and obstetric patients and Haemodialysis suite. There is Carte Blanche theatre donated to the hospital by Carte Blanche for operating on children.

Frere also offers allied health services such as Physiotherapy, Occupational Therapy, Speech and Language Therapy, Audiology, Psychology, Social workers, Orthotics, Dentistry and Dietetics.

Other services include CSSD Services, Pharmacy, Occupational Services, X-ray Services with Computed Tomography (CT), Magnetic Resonance Imaging (MRI) and mammography facility, NHLS Laboratory, Blood Bank, Laundry Services, Kitchen Services and Mortuary.

GPS coordinates of the entrance gate in Amalinda Main Road: 32.99636°S 27.89123°E
