= Enoch Mgijima Local Municipality =

Enoch Mgijima
- Local municipality
- Coordinates: 31.719°S 26.319°E
- Country: South Africa
- Province: Eastern Cape
- District: Chris Hani
- Seat: Komani

Government
  - Type: Municipal council
  - Mayor: (ANC)

Area
  - Total: 13,584 km^{2} (5,245 sq mi)

Population (2011, 2022)
  - Total: 245,975 297,055

Black African 269,952 White 10,685 Asian 1,622 Coloured 13,003 Other group 1,744
- Time zone: UTC+2 (SAST)
- Municipal code: EC139

Enoch Mgijima Municipality (Xhosa: uMasipala wase Enoch Mgijima) is a local municipality within the Chris Hani District Municipality, in the Eastern Cape province of South Africa. It was established after the August 2016 local elections by merging the Tsolwana, Inkwanca, and Lukhanji local municipalities.

== Politics ==
The municipal council consists of sixty-eight members elected by mixed-member proportional representation. Thirty-four councillors are elected by first-past-the-post voting in thirty-four wards, while the remaining thirty-four are chosen from party lists so that the total number of party representatives is proportional to the number of votes received.

In the election of 4 November 2026 the African National Congress (ANC) lost its majority, but won a plurality of 31 seats.

The following table shows the results of the election.

Party	Ward			List			Total seats
Party	Votes	%	Seats	Votes	%	Seats	Total seats
African National Congress	27,709	43.43	26	28,588	44.48	5	31
Democratic Alliance	10,214	16.01	4	9,713	15.11	7	11
South African Communist Party	6,139	9.62	1	6,758	10.52	6	7
The Independents	4,522	7.09	2	7,117	11.07	4	6
Economic Freedom Fighters	3,369	5.28	0	3,468	5.40	4	4
ActionSA	1,693	2.65	0	1,838	2.86	2	2
African Transformation Movement	1,812	2.84	0	1,704	2.65	2	2
Patriotic Alliance	1,296	2.03	1	1,230	1.91	0	1
Independent candidates	2,203	3.45	0				0
African Independent Congress	1,647	2.58	0	529	0.82	1	1
Komani Progress Action	843	1.32	0	837	1.30	1	1
uMkhonto weSizwe Party	796	1.25	0	737	1.15	1	1
Hofmeyr Community Development Forum	586	0.92	0	599	0.93	1	1
8 other parties	969	1.52	0	1,147	1.78	0	0
Total	63,798	100.00	34	64,265	100.00	34	68
Valid votes	63,798	97.61		64,265	97.77		
Invalid/blank votes	1,564	2.39		1,463	2.23		
Total votes	65,362	100.00		65,728	100.00		
Registered voters/turnout	128,231	50.97		128,231	51.26		

== Maladministration ==
In October 2021, a sports facility costing R15 million was opened. Originally intended as a floodlit stadium with ablutions, borehole and water reticulation, the final deliverable was far removed from this. The facility is derelict, and has never hosted a sports event.

In 2020, the Art Centre closed down. It is now a vandalised ruin.

In April 2021, the Chris Hani Craft Hub burned down under suspicious circumstances.

In October 2021, the Heritage building burned down under suspicious circumstances.

In January 2022, the Historic Komani Town hall mysteriously burned down under suspicious circumstances.

In January 2023, an unknown figure known as "Mr. Lazola" founded the movement called Komani Protest Action which roused the people of Komani to protest against the municipality's leaders. The protests lasted for at least 2 weeks and gained national attention, causing a city wide shutdown which had not been done since 1986. The municipality promised to deliver change as per the requests of the people of Komani, but never did. After an internal leadership dispute and legal action from the municipality and businesses in the area, the leadership of the movement split up and is now led by Mncedisi Mbengo.

As of January 2024, the municipality is under administration, one of 32 in the country, and three in the Eastern Cape where the provincial executive has intervened due to maladministration

As of 21 February 2024, Shereen Noble of the Auditor General of South Africa dubbed Enoch Mgijima Municipality as the "worst run municipality in the country", citing the fact that the municipality is in debt of R1.4 billion. Noble highlighted R220.5 million of expenditure was deemed fruitless and wasteful and total current liabilities exceeded total current assets by R984 million.

The municipality suffers from constant power outages due to consistent substation faults. These occasionally go from ward to ward, are daily and last for weeks to months depending on the ward.

The municipality suffers from some of the worst roads in the country, with the R140 between Komani and Lady Frere being dubbed as "one of the most dangerous in the country".

A good 70%-85% of the municipality is without functional streetlights.

As of December 2025, both of the town's swimming pools have fallen into disrepair.
