= Emalahleni Local Municipality, Eastern Cape =

Coordinates: 31°42′14″S 27°13′57″E

Emalahleni
- Local municipality
- Seal

- Location in the Eastern Cape
- Country: South Africa
- Province: Eastern Cape
- District: Chris Hani
- Seat: Cacadu
- Wards: 17

Government
  - Type: Municipal council
  - Mayor: (ANC)

Area
  - Total: 3,447 km^{2} (1,331 sq mi)

Population (2011)
  - Total: 119,460
  - Density: 34.66/km^{2} (89.76/sq mi)

Racial makeup (2011)
  - Black African: 98.5%
  - Coloured: 0.6%
  - Indian/Asian: 0.1%
  - White: 0.6%

First languages (2011)
  - Xhosa: 95.2%
  - English: 1.5%
  - Afrikaans: 1.2%
  - Other: 2.1%
- Time zone: UTC+2 (SAST)
- Municipal code: EC136

Emalahleni Municipality (Xhosa: uMasipala wase Emalahleni) is a local municipality within the Chris Hani District Municipality, in the Eastern Cape province of South Africa. Emalahleni is an isiXhosa word meaning "a place of coal".

== Politics ==
The municipal council consists of thirty-three members elected by mixed-member proportional representation. Seventeen councillors are elected by first-past-the-post voting in seventeen wards, while the remaining sixteen are chosen from party lists so that the total number of party representatives is proportional to the number of votes received.

In the election of 4 November 2026 the African National Congress (ANC) won a reduced majority of twenty-four seats.

The following table shows the results of the election.

Party	Ward			List			Total seats
Party	Votes	%	Seats	Votes	%	Seats	Total seats
African National Congress	22,147	69.07	17	22,872	71.75	7	24
Democratic Alliance	3,323	10.36	0	3,605	11.31	4	4
South African Communist Party	1,659	5.17	0	1,818	5.70	2	2
Economic Freedom Fighters	1,252	3.90	0	1,374	4.31	1	1
Independent candidates	1,135	3.54	0				0
Iliso Labantu Movement for Social Change	480	1.50	0	501	1.57	1	1
African Transformation Movement	335	1.04	0	504	1.58	1	1
7 other parties	1,733	5.40	0	1,205	3.78	0	0
Total	32,064	100.00	17	31,879	100.00	16	33
Valid votes	32,064	97.00		31,879	96.48		
Invalid/blank votes	993	3.00		1,162	3.52		
Total votes	33,057	100.00		33,041	100.00		
Registered voters/turnout	64,177	51.51		64,177	51.48		

== Main places ==
The 2001 census divided the municipality into the following main places:

Place	Code	Area (km^{2})	Population
Cacadu	22301	245.07	13,780
Cala	22302	9.68	57
Dordrecht	22303	15.67	4,454
Emaqwatini	22305	27.01	1,920
Eqolombeni	22306	61.56	1,603
Guba	22307	315.77	8,807
Hala	22308	114.03	2,835
Indwe	22309	12.17	1,425
Cacadu	22310	24.71	729
Lakishi	22311	23.79	3,557
Macubeni	22312	350.56	16,760
Manyano	22313	0.16	1,370
Mavuya	22314	0.59	3,023
Mhlontlo	22315	340.69	18,960
Mzamomhle	22316	0.29	880
Nonesi	22317	557.59	28,776
Sinakho	22318	1.39	4,279
Remainder of the municipality	22304	1,134.11	2,732
