= Chris Hani District Municipality =

Municipal district in South Africa

Chris Hani
- District municipality
- Seal

- Location in the Eastern Cape
- Interactive map of Chris Hani District Municipality (2026)
- Coordinates: 31°53′S 26°52′E
- Country: South Africa
- Province: Eastern Cape
- Seat: Queenstown
- Local municipalities: List: Inxuba Yethemba; Enoch Mgijima; Intsika Yethu; Emalahleni; Dr AB Xuma; Sakhisizwe

Government
  - Type: Municipal council
  - Mayor: Wongama Gela

Area
  - Total: 36,144 km^{2} (13,955 sq mi)

Population (2011)
  - Total: 795,461
  - Density: 22.008/km^{2} (57.001/sq mi)

Racial makeup (2011)
  - Black African: 93.3%
  - Coloured: 4.1%
  - Indian/Asian: 0.2%
  - White: 2.0%

First languages (2011)
  - Xhosa: 88.6%
  - Afrikaans: 6.1%
  - English: 2.6%
  - Other: 2.7%
- Time zone: UTC+2 (SAST)
- Municipal code: DC13

The Chris Hani District Municipality (Xhosa: uMasipala weSithili sase Chris Hani) is a landlocked district municipality situated in the centre of the Eastern Cape province of South Africa and is made up of eight local municipalities. Most of the communities are in rural areas. The landscape ranges from moist uplands and grassland hills to the arid Karoo scrubland.

In 2016, the region reported a population of 840 000 people, accounting for 1.5% of South Africa's total population and 12% of the Eastern Cape's total population. Most of the district municipality's employment is based on unskilled labour.

== Local Municipalities ==
Map of the Eastern Cape with municipalities named and districts shaded (2016)

In the east are Emalahleni, Dr AB Xuma (previously Engcobo), Intsika Yethu, Sakhisizwe Local Municipality and a section of Enoch Mgijima Local Municipality. These local municipalities were originally part of the Transkei or Ciskei, which were former homelands during Apartheid, designed to separate different ethnic groups. This area is still characterised by its rural settlements and typical subsistence agriculture activities.

Inxuba Yethemba Local Municipality and Enoch Mgijima Local Municipality are lying in the west. These areas were originally part of the Republic of South Africa during Apartheid.

The district’s agricultural industry is identified as dualistic since it is divided into the first economy of commercial agriculture and the second economy of subsistence farming. In spite of its significant agricultural outputs, the municipalities are importers of processed food.

== Service Delivery ==
The provision of basic services is particularly limited in the eastern municipalities which are largely rural. Backlogs include the delivery of tap water and adequate sanitation, school infrastructure and tarred roads.

=== Main Roads ===
The district is situated on the intersections of the N6 from East London to Aliwal North via Komani, the R61 from Komani to Mthatha through Cofimvaba via Ngcobo and the N10 from Middelburg to Aliwal North via Cradock. Evidence of tarred roads in the rest of the district municipality is below the Eastern Cape’s provincial average – resulting in limited public transportation and access to health care facilities in bigger towns.

=== Water ===
The district municipality is situated on the watershed of four river systems. These are namely the Orange River, Great Fish River, Mbashe River and Great Kei River. Surface water sources supply water for most of the towns in the area while only a few rely on groundwater supplies.

In rural areas, communities use water from unprotected springs, streams and boreholes. For the commercial farms in the west, the water supply is usually groundwater from boreholes.
