= Bell River (South Africa) =

River in the Eastern Cape, South Africa

Location
- Country: South Africa
- Province: Eastern Cape

Physical characteristics
- Source
  - coordinates: 30°40′34″S 28°08′33″E
- Mouth: Sterkspruit
  - coordinates: 30°51′08″S 27°46′43″E

Basin features
- River system: Orange River

The Bell River is a river that drains the Drakensberg uplands of the Eastern Cape province of South Africa. Its drainage basin, a part of the headwaters of the Orange River, is approximately 424 square kilometres (160 sq mi) in extent, ranging from an altitude of 1,720 m (a.m.s.l.) to 3,001 m. The river's source is near the Lesotho border (30°40′34″S 28°08′33″E) to the north of the high Naude's Neck Pass. Downstream it passes the town of Rhodes, to eventually form a tributary of the Kraai River some 40 km (direct) from its source. In fact the Bell River and the Sterkspruit, become the Kraai River just northwest of Moshesh's Ford (30°51′08″S 27°46′43″E) flowing further west towards Aliwal North, where it joins the Orange River (30°40′4″S 26°45′9″E).

The river has a strong population of rainbow trout. The Bell's Wild Trout Festival is based in the town of Rhodes and is organised by the Wild Trout Association. Up to 80 participants fish for three days on 180 km of running water which is within an hour's drive of the village.

The catchment area has been used extensively for grazing by commercial farmers since the 1870s. Consequently, the river's water quality and channel stability is affected by increased sediment loading from widespread gully erosion in the catchment area. As a remedy, willow species of the Salix family, in particular Salix caprea, have been planted along the banks in an effort to prevent further channel shifting in the form of meander cutoffs.
