= Tayler Bequest Hospital (Mount Fletcher) =

- Eastern Cape Department of Health

Geography
- Location: Mount Fletcher, Joe Gqabi District Municipality, Eastern Cape, South Africa
- Coordinates: 30°41′22″S 28°30′37″E

Organisation
- Care system: Public
- Type: District

Services
- Emergency department: Yes
- Beds: 146

Links
- Website: Eastern Cape Department of Health website - Joe Gqabi District Hospitals
- Lists: Hospitals in South Africa
- Other links: List of hospitals in South Africa

Tayler Bequest District Hospital is a Provincial government funded hospital in the Elundini Local Municipality area in Mount Fletcher, Eastern Cape in South Africa.

The hospital departments include Emergency department, Paediatric ward, Maternity ward, Obstetrics/Gynecology, Out Patients Department, Surgical Services, Medical Services, Operating Theatre & CSSD Services, Pharmacy, Anti-Retroviral (ARV) treatment for HIV/AIDS, Post Trauma Counseling Services, X-ray Services, Physiotherapy, NHLS Laboratory, Oral Health Care Provides, Laundry Services, Kitchen Services and Mortuary.
