= Mzimvubu River =

River in the Eastern Cape, South Africa

Mzimvubu River Umzimvubu River (Xhosa)
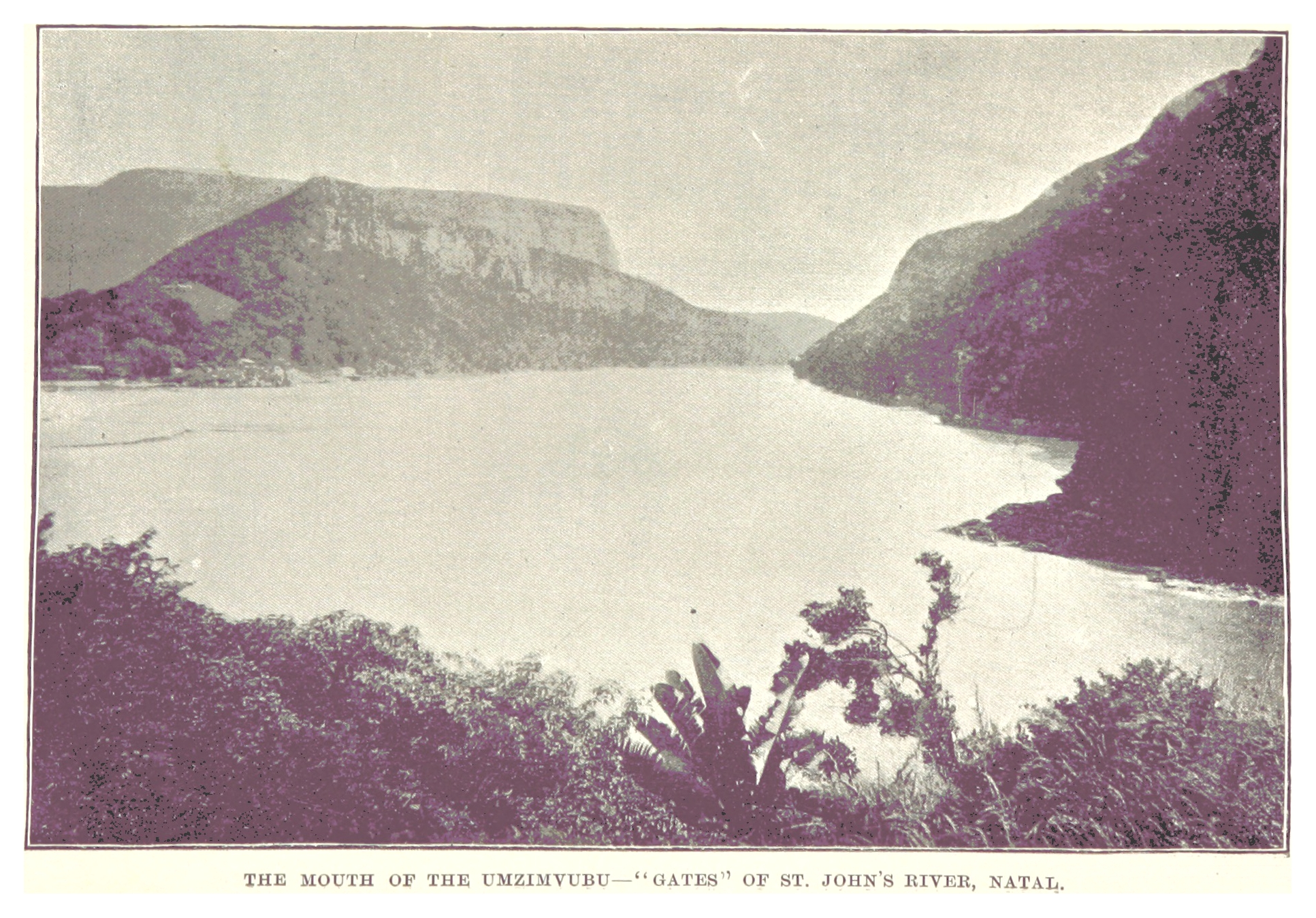
- The Mzimvubu "gates"

- Location of the Mzimvubu River mouth
- Etymology: Meaning "place of the hippopotamus" in Xhosa

Location
- Country: South Africa
- Province: Eastern Cape Province

Physical characteristics
- Source
  - location: Drakensberg, Eastern Cape
  - elevation: 2,050 m (6,730 ft)
- Mouth: Indian Ocean
  - location: Port St. Johns
  - coordinates: 31°37′S 29°32′E
  - elevation: 0 m (0 ft)
- Length: 250 km (160 mi)
- Basin size: 19,853 km^{2} (7,665 sq mi)

Basin features
- Tributaries
  - left: Kinira, Thina, Tsitsa
  - right: Mzintlava

Mzimvubu River or Umzimvubu River is one of the most important rivers in South Africa. It is located in the Eastern Cape Province.

== Course ==
The river has its source in the northern region of the Eastern Cape, in the area of Matatiele and Mount Fletcher near the Lesotho border. The Mzimvubu flows with twists and turns generally in a southeastern direction and flows into the Indian Ocean through an impressive gorge known as the "Gates of St John" into an estuary located at Port St. Johns. It is approximately 400 km long with a catchment area of 19,853 km².

Although it is one of South Africa's major rivers, the Mzimvubu and its basin are largely undeveloped. Presently this river is part of the Mzimvubu to Keiskamma Water Management Area.

== History ==
In 1635 Portuguese ship 'Nossa Senhora de Belem' ran aground at the mouth of the Mzimvubu River.

The Mzimvubu River divides Pondoland into an Eastern and Western Pondoland. Formerly the river mouth was used as a harbor, but this activity was abandoned in the 1940s when the estuary became too shallow for large vessels owing to siltation and the fact that the entrance is sometimes obstructed by sand. Presently the estuary is river is navigable only for small craft for about 10 km upriver.

== Tributaries ==
The main tributaries of the Mzimvubu River are the Tsitsa River, the Thina River (Tina), the Kinira River and the Mzintlava River.

== Ecology ==
Some of the fishes caught in its waters are Oncorhynchus mykiss, an introduced species, Barbus anoplus and Anguilla mossambica; others, such as Micropterus salmoides and Cyprinus carpio, are invasive species.

Bull sharks frequent the waters and are known to breed in the river and are linked to a spate of attacks on nearby beaches.

Catchment-management initiatives in the upper river basin include the Umzimvubu Catchment Partnership Programme, which was established by Environmental and Rural Solutions and Conservation South Africa.

== See also ==
- List of rivers of South Africa
- List of estuaries of South Africa
- Port St. Johns
