= Disa galpinii =

Scientific classification
- Kingdom: Plantae
- Clade: Tracheophytes
- Clade: Angiosperms
- Clade: Monocots
- Order: Asparagales
- Family: Orchidaceae
- Subfamily: Orchidoideae
- Genus: Disa
- Species: D. galpinii

Binomial name
- Disa galpinii Rolfe

Synonyms
- Disa minax Kraenzl.

Species of flowering plant

Disa galpinii is a perennial plant and geophyte belonging to the genus Disa. The plant is endemic to KwaZulu-Natal and the Eastern Cape where it occurs at Ramatseliso's Gate and Naude's Neck Pass at altitudes of 2 000m along streams.
