= Kraai River =

River in the Eastern Cape, South Africa

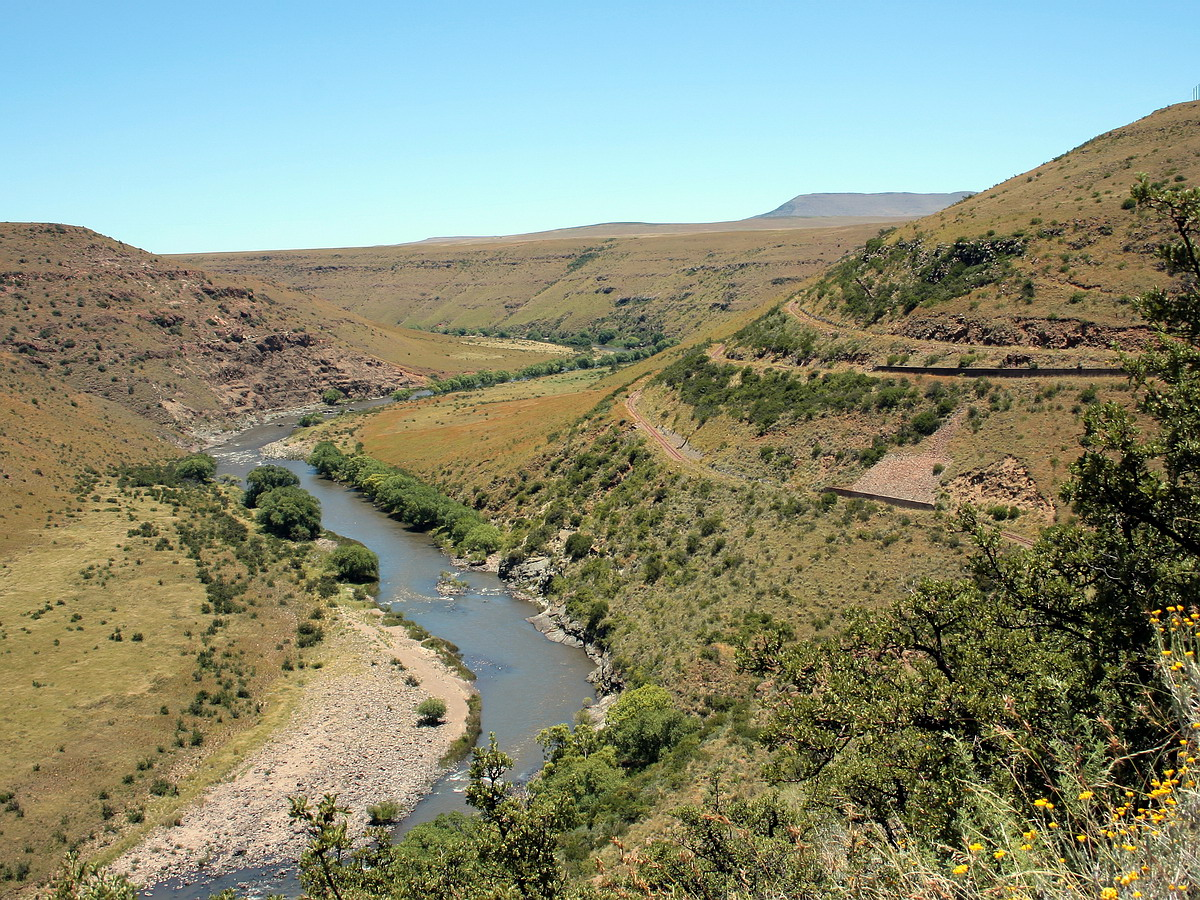
- The river near Barkly East

- Location within South Africa

Location
- Country: South Africa
- Province: Eastern Cape

Physical characteristics
- Source
  - location: Moshesh's Ford
  - coordinates: 30°51′9″S 27°46′40″E
  - elevation: 1,845 m (6,053 ft)
- Mouth
  - location: Aliwal North, Eastern Cape, South Africa
  - coordinates: 30°40′2″S 26°45′6″E
  - elevation: 1,340 m (4,400 ft)

Basin features
- River system: Orange River
- Tributaries
  - left: Karnmelkspruit
  - right: Bell River

The Kraai River (literally "Crow River") is a tributary of the Orange River (also called Gariep River by locals) that flows near Barkly East in the Eastern Cape, South Africa.

== Description ==
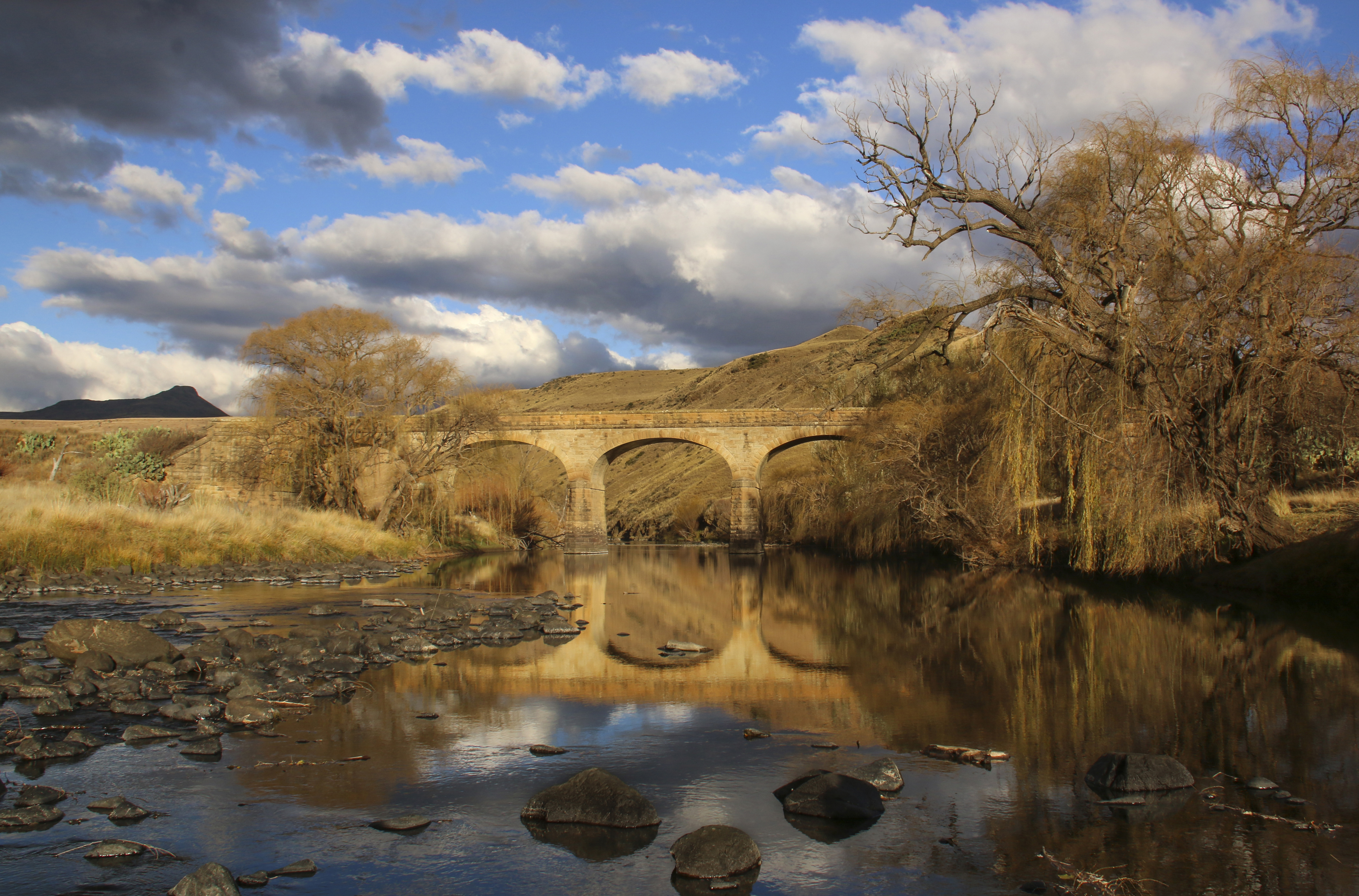
Loch bridge on the Kraai River

The Kraai River originates in the mountains south of Lesotho and flows westward from the confluence of the Bell River and the Sterk Spruit at Moshesh's Ford at 30°51′09″S 27°46′40″E all the way to Aliwal North, where it joins the Orange River at 30°40′02″S 26°45′06″E.

The river flows almost entirely over sandstone rocks of the Clarens Formation.

The Kraai is fishable, containing rainbow trout, brown trout and smallmouth yellowfish.

In 1881 a sandstone arch bridge called the J W Sauer bridge was completed over the river. The bridge linked communities in the Kraai River basin with Aliwal North. The Sauer bridge and the Loch Bridge on the farm Tyger Krantz, are now Provincial Heritage sites.

== Major tributaries ==
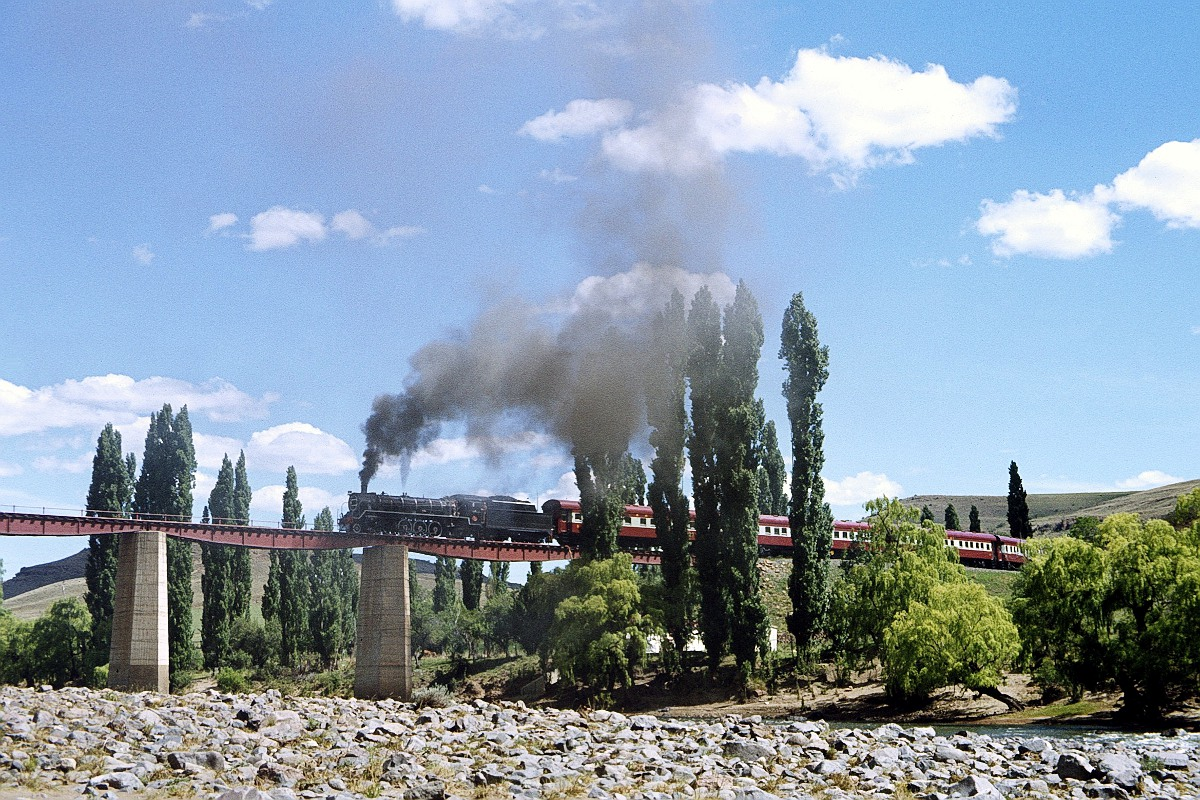
A special tourist train steaming across the Kraai River bridge near Lady Grey in 1979

- Bell River and a tributary of the Bell, the Kloppershoek Spruit
- Sterk Spruit, its tributaries are the Bok Spruit and Rifle Spruit
- Joggem Spruit
- Langkloof Spruit
- Diep Spruit and its tributary, the Three Drifts Stream
- Carlisleshoek Spruit and the Maartenshoek Spruit
- Klein Wildebeest Spruit
- Saalboom Spruit and its tributary, the Vaalhoek Spruit
- Karnmelk Spruit

== See also ==
- List of rivers of South Africa
- List of reservoirs and dams in South Africa
