= Carlislehoekspruit Pass =

Mountain pass

Coordinates: 30.7188°S 27.9568°E

Carlislehoekspruit Pass (English: Carlisle is a surname, hoek is Corner, spruit is a brook) is a mountain pass situated in the Eastern Cape province of South Africa, on the road between Rhodes and the Tiffindell Ski Resort near Ben Macdhui.

- Driving skill level: Intermediate to expert.
- Make use of local knowledge before attempting the drive and be sure to take warm clothing with you, just in case.
- Road condition: Gravel surface (some sections partially covered with concrete).
- Remarks: Very steep. Some hair raising bends. Very scenic.
