= Ben Macdhui =

Ben Macdhui (or Ben Macdui) is the name of two mountains:

- Ben Macdui, a mountain in Scotland
- Ben Macdhui (Eastern Cape), a mountain in South Africa
