= Mooi River =

Mooi River may refer to:

- Mooi River (Vaal), a tributary of the Vaal
- Mooi River (Tugela), a tributary of the Tugela River in KwaZulu-Natal
  - Mooi River (town), a town by the Mooi River in KwaZulu-Natal
  - Mooi River (House of Assembly of South Africa constituency)
- Mooi River (Tsitsa), a river in the Eastern Cape Province, a tributary of the Tsitsa River
