= Tsitsa River =

River in the Eastern Cape, South Africa

Tsitsa River iTsitsa
- Location of the Tsitsa River mouth
- Etymology: Tsitsa meaning 'to trickle' or 'to ooze' in the Xhosa language, referring to the rain and snow falling on the Drakensberg slopes

Location
- Country: South Africa
- State: Eastern Cape

Physical characteristics
- Source: Drakensberg
  - location: SE of Rhodes
  - coordinates: 30°58′S 28°3′E
  - elevation: 2,550 m (8,370 ft)
- Mouth: Mzimvubu River
  - location: SE of Qumbu
  - coordinates: 31°17′52″S 29°13′32″E
  - elevation: 183 m (600 ft)

Basin features
- Tributaries
  - right: Pot River, Mooi River, Inxu River

The Tsitsa River (Afrikaans: Tsitsarivier; Xhosa: iTsitsa) is a river in the Eastern Cape Province, South Africa. It is a tributary of the Mzimvubu River and belongs to the Mzimvubu to Keiskamma Water Management Area.

== Course ==
The Tsitsa rises in the Drakensberg 15 km to the SE of Rhodes, about 80 km west of Mount Frere, and flows eastwards. The Tsitsa Falls are located in its upper course, amidst a mountainous area of great beauty. Bending and flowing southwards for a few miles, the river passes east of Maclear, before it bends eastwards again. Finally it empties into the Mzimvubu River while passing through deep river gorges about 36 km southeast of Qumbu.

Its main tributaries are the Mooi River, Inxu River (Wildebeesrivier) and the Pot River.

The Tsitsa River used to form part of the western border of the former Transkei. Now the Tsitsa is a popular place for whitewater kayaking.

== Dams in the basin ==
There are only relatively small dams in the Tsitsa River basin. The Maclear Dam on the Mooi River supplies water to Maclear town and the Ugie Dam on the Wildebeest River supplies water to Ugie town.

== See also ==
- List of rivers of South Africa
- List of reservoirs and dams in South Africa
- Mzimvubu River
