= Rhodes, South Africa =

Rhodes
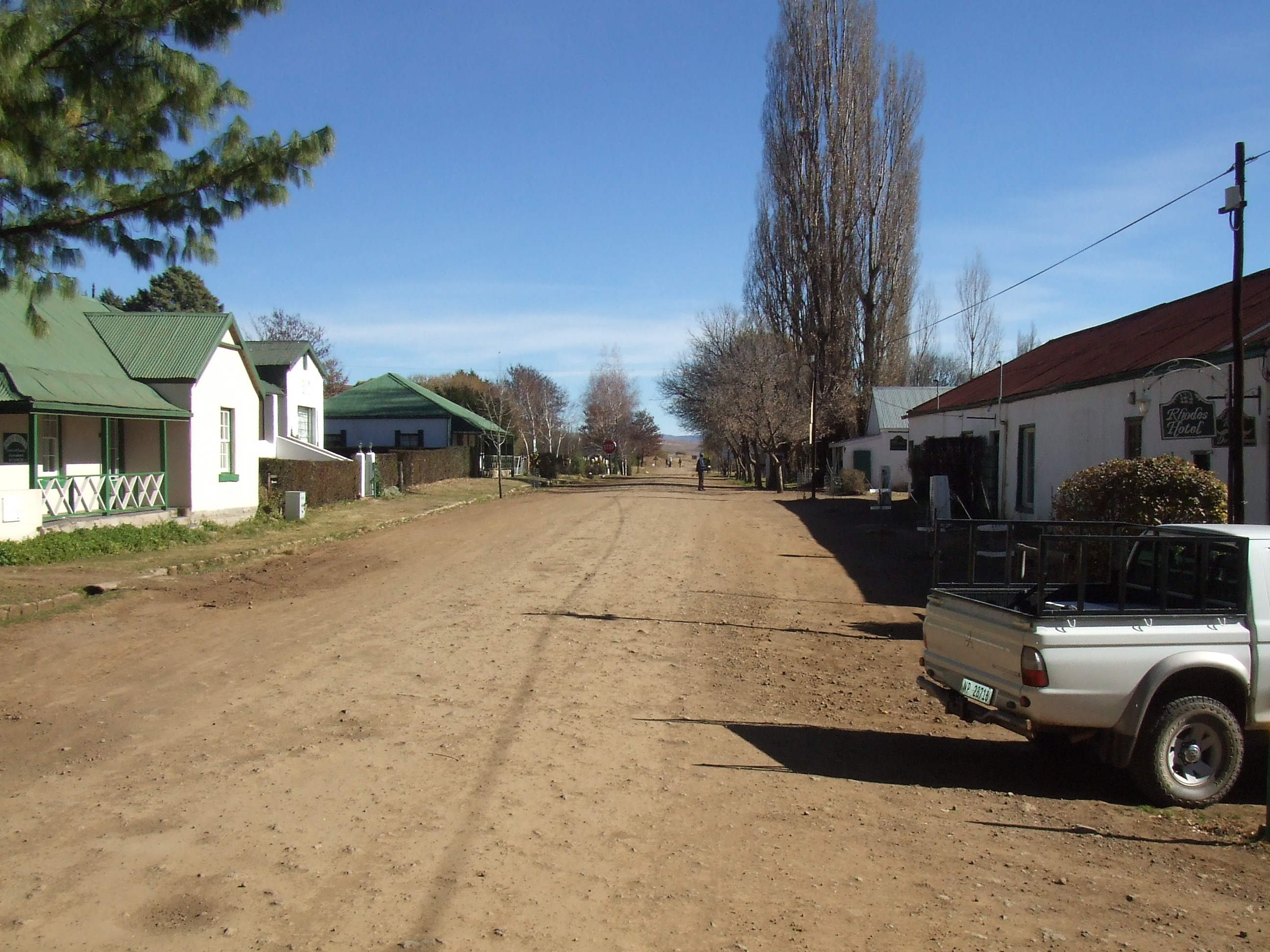
- Rhodes

- Location within Eastern Cape Location within South Africa Location within Africa
- Coordinates: 30°47′44″S 27°57′51″E
- Country: South Africa
- Province: Eastern Cape
- District: Joe Gqabi
- Municipality: Senqu
- Established: 1894

Area
  - Total: 10.4 km^{2} (4.0 sq mi)
- Elevation: 1,832 m (6,010 ft)

Population (2011)
  - Total: 696
  - Density: 66.9/km^{2} (173/sq mi)

Racial makeup (2011)
  - Black African: 92.7%
  - White: 6.0%
  - Indian/Asian: 0.1%
  - Coloured: 0.9%
  - Other: 0.0%

First languages (2011)
  - Xhosa: 82.1%
  - Sotho: 10.2%
  - Afrikaans: 3.5%
  - English: 2.7%
  - Other: 1.4%
- Time zone: UTC+2 (SAST)
- Postal code (street): 9787
- PO box: 9787
- Area code: 045

Rhodes is a hamlet or small village alongside the wild trout rich Bell River, near Ben Macdhui (at 3001 m the highest mountain in the Cape region) in the Drakensberg mountains of the north Eastern Cape, South Africa.

== History ==
Rhodes is located in the Eastern Cape Highlands, near the escarpment in the southernmost end of the Drakensberg mountain range in the magisterial district of Barkly East. It is 1,832 m above sea level and is 16 km due south of the Mountain Kingdom of Lesotho. The village is surrounded by the towns of Maclear, Ugie, and Elliot below the escarpment and Barkly East above this barrier. It is approximately 60 km from Barkly East, the nearest town, via a narrow, winding, gravel road.

The farm Tintern, owned my Mr J A Vorster, was advertised for sale as 247 erven, or lots, on 16 September 1891. In September 1984, the erf-holders and residents met to petition the government to proclaim Rhodes as a village under the Village Management Act of 1881. Rhodes was granted municipal rights in 1897.

Between 24 June 1901 and 7 February 1902, the village was invaded no less than 29 times during the Second Boer War.

Local tradition claims that the settlement was initially known as Rossville, after the local Dutch Reformed Church minister, and was later named Rhodes in honor of Cecil John Rhodes, the Prime Minister of the Cape Colony. Another tradition holds that Rhodes acknowledged the naming by sending a wagonload of stone pine trees along with £500.

In 1863, the Scottish minister Reg. David Ross accepted a call from the congregation at Lady Grey; during his tenure, he was regarded as a strong authority on legal matters and was held in great esteem. He served as the first minister from 1863 until his retirement in 1908. His ministry extended to the wider local community, including Rossville, which he travelled to on horseback. Local accounts claim that Ross was detained by British authorities during the Second Boer War in Aliwal North and, after his release, ceased conducting his services in English.

The majority of buildings were constructed around the turn of the century and the village continued to grow and prosper, its heyday being between 1911 and 1945. The advent of the "Wool Boom" of the 1950s provided a brief upsurge but the riches gained were soon spent. At this time, wool was sold for a pound (£) for a pound. A gradual decline set in after this flash-in-the-pan and which continued into the 70s as witnessed by the eventual closure of the white school in 1976. Municipal status was relinquished in 1979 and control ceded to the local authority, the then Drakensberg District Council, now known as Joe Gqabi District Municipality. A brief upsurge followed with the advent of the so-called "Hippie Era".

== Activities & annual events ==
Rhodes is the home of three significant sporting events, the oldest of which is the Rhodes Trail Run. This is a 52 km event held in the heart of winter which starts and ends in the village.

Billed as "The Most Extraordinary Mountain Biking Race in Africa", the Rhodes Mountain Bike Challenge, it was held in October each year, is an 82 km grind. More recently, the race date has been changed to September. The route follows the road to Naude's Neck and then off past the Tenahead Lodge, the Cairntoul Stock Theft Unit Police Station and along the Lesotho border to pass the Tiffindell Ski Resort and back to Rhodes via the Carlislehoekspruit Pass.

The annual Wild Trout Festival is based in Rhodes and is organised by the Wild Trout Association. The field is limited to 40 participants who fish for three days on the 180 km of running water which is within an hours drive of the village.

There are is an extensive common land of which many people can hike in.

A number of 4x4 vehicle routes are available in the area. Using Rhodes as a starting and end point, day trips of varying length can be planned depending on requirements and time available. Being off the beaten track, it is important to be prepared as the weather can and does change at short notice. Rhodes is also central to 8 mountain passes in the district that have become very popular in more recent years.

Rock art by members of the various San communities abounds in sandstone valleys in the area and can be viewed by prior arrangement only.

== Geography ==
=== Climate ===
Rhodes has a subtropical highland climate (Cwb, according to the Köppen climate classification), with mild summers and chilly, dry winters, with occasional snowfalls. The average annual precipitation is 626 mm (25 in), with most rainfall occurring mainly during summer.

Rhodes

Climate chart (precipitation, max. and min. temperature)
J	F	M	A	M	J	J	A	S	O	N	D
96 22 10	93 21 9	89 19 8	46 16 4	26 14 1	11 11 −1	10 11 −1	11 14 0	26 16 3	55 18 5	71 19 7	92 21 8
- █ Average max. and min. temperatures in °C
- █ Precipitation totals in mm
- Source: SA Explorer
Imperial conversion
J	F	M	A	M	J	J	A	S	O	N	D
3.8 72 50	3.7 70 48	3.5 66 46	1.8 61 39	1 57 34	0.4 52 30	0.4 52 30	0.4 57 32	1 61 37	2.2 64 41	2.8 66 45	3.6 70 46
- █ Average max. and min. temperatures in °F
- █ Precipitation totals in inches

=== Environment ===
Work in the Eastern Grasslands landscape centred on Rhodes includes a sustainable grazing initiative and wool value-chain project involving Conservation South Africa.
