= Elundini Local Municipality elections =

Local Municipality Election

The Elundini Local Municipality council consists of thirty-four members elected by mixed-member proportional representation. Seventeen councillors are elected by first-past-the-post voting in twenty wards, while the remaining seventeen are chosen from party lists so that the total number of party representatives is proportional to the number of votes received. In the election of 1 November 2021 the African National Congress (ANC) won a majority of twenty-eight seats.

== Results ==
Event	ANC	DA	EFF	UDM	Other	Total
2000 election	27	-	-	4	1	32
2006 election	29	0	-	2	1	32
2011 election	28	2	-	2	2	34
2016 election	28	2	1	1	2	34
2021 election	28	1	2	1	2	34

== December 2000 election ==
The following table shows the results of the 2000 election.

Party	Ward			List			Total seats
Party	Votes	%	Seats	Votes	%	Seats	Total seats
African National Congress	10,399	72.76	15	21,183	85.08	12	27
United Democratic Movement	1,687	11.80	0	3,715	14.92	4	4
Independent candidates	2,153	15.06	1				1
Pan Africanist Congress of Azania	53	0.37	0				0
Total	14,292	100.00	16	24,898	100.00	16	32
Valid votes	14,292	96.71		24,898	94.62		
Invalid/blank votes	486	3.29		1,416	5.38		
Total votes	14,778	100.00		26,314	100.00		
Registered voters/turnout	48,928	30.20		48,928	53.78		

== March 2006 election ==
The following table shows the results of the 2006 election.

Party	Ward			List			Total seats
Party	Votes	%	Seats	Votes	%	Seats	Total seats
African National Congress	24,423	84.22	16	27,116	88.16	13	29
United Democratic Movement	1,259	4.34	0	2,536	8.25	2	2
Independent candidates	2,467	8.51	0				0
Pan Africanist Congress of Azania	590	2.03	0	571	1.86	1	1
Democratic Alliance	261	0.90	0	534	1.74	0	0
Total	29,000	100.00	16	30,757	100.00	16	32
Valid votes	29,000	96.78		30,757	96.51		
Invalid/blank votes	966	3.22		1,111	3.49		
Total votes	29,966	100.00		31,868	100.00		
Registered voters/turnout	55,908	53.60		55,908	57.00		

== May 2011 election ==
The following table shows the results of the 2011 election.

Party	Ward			List			Total seats
Party	Votes	%	Seats	Votes	%	Seats	Total seats
African National Congress	25,851	80.96	17	25,181	80.07	11	28
Democratic Alliance	1,568	4.91	0	2,021	6.43	2	2
United Democratic Movement	1,497	4.69	0	1,465	4.66	2	2
African Independent Congress	646	2.02	0	2,259	7.18	2	2
Independent candidates	1,962	6.14	0				0
Pan Africanist Congress of Azania	264	0.83	0	251	0.80	0	0
African People's Convention	144	0.45	0	273	0.87	0	0
Total	31,932	100.00	17	31,450	100.00	17	34
Valid votes	31,932	96.83		31,450	96.32		
Invalid/blank votes	1,046	3.17		1,201	3.68		
Total votes	32,978	100.00		32,651	100.00		
Registered voters/turnout	58,401	56.47		58,401	55.91		

== August 2016 election ==
The following table shows the results of the 2016 election.

Party	Ward			List			Total seats
Party	Votes	%	Seats	Votes	%	Seats	Total seats
African National Congress	28,263	83.48	16	28,375	84.09	12	28
Democratic Alliance	1,861	5.50	0	1,767	5.24	2	2
Economic Freedom Fighters	1,125	3.32	0	1,393	4.13	1	1
African Independent Congress	922	2.72	0	1,196	3.54	1	1
Independent candidates	1,124	3.32	1				1
United Democratic Movement	405	1.20	0	719	2.13	1	1
African People's Convention	77	0.23	0	201	0.60	0	0
Pan Africanist Congress of Azania	78	0.23	0	93	0.28	0	0
Total	33,855	100.00	17	33,744	100.00	17	34
Valid votes	33,855	97.43		33,744	96.92		
Invalid/blank votes	894	2.57		1,072	3.08		
Total votes	34,749	100.00		34,816	100.00		
Registered voters/turnout	63,893	54.39		63,893	54.49		

== November 2021 election ==
The following table shows the results of the 2021 election.

Party	Ward			List			Total seats
Party	Votes	%	Seats	Votes	%	Seats	Total seats
African National Congress	22,994	80.85	17	22,590	80.06	11	28
Economic Freedom Fighters	1,944	6.84	0	2,135	7.57	2	2
Democratic Alliance	932	3.28	0	951	3.37	1	1
United Democratic Movement	798	2.81	0	811	2.87	1	1
African Transformation Movement	509	1.79	0	593	2.10	1	1
Independent candidates	896	3.15	0				0
South African Royal Kingdoms Organization	366	1.29	0	432	1.53	1	1
African Independent Congress				706	2.50	0	0
Total	28,439	100.00	17	28,218	100.00	17	34
Valid votes	28,439	97.09		28,218	96.67		
Invalid/blank votes	851	2.91		972	3.33		
Total votes	29,290	100.00		29,190	100.00		
Registered voters/turnout	61,114	47.93		61,114	47.76		

=== By-elections from November 2021 ===
The following by-elections were held to fill vacant ward seats in the period since November 2021.

Date	Ward	Party of the previous councillor	Party of the newly elected councillor
1 Oct 2025	5	African National Congress	African National Congress
