= Karringmelk Spruit =

River in the Eastern Cape, South Africa

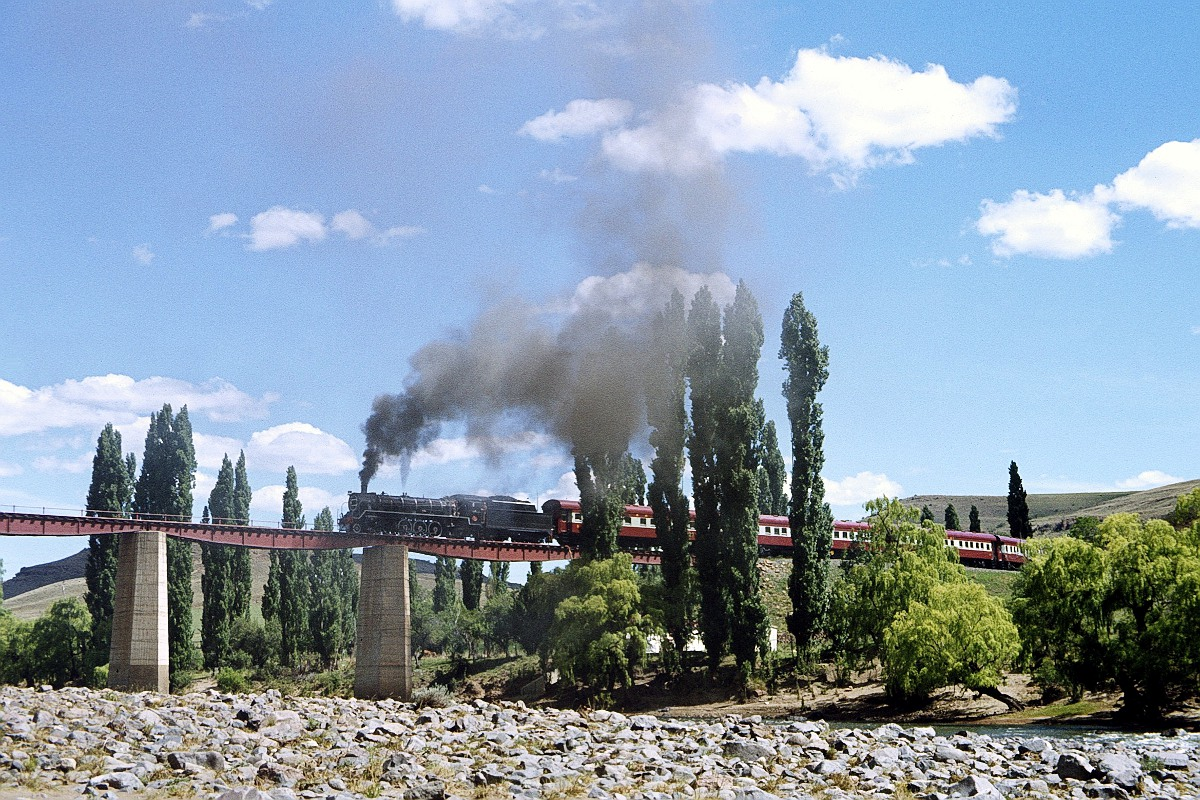
- A special tourist train steaming across the Kraai River bridge near Lady Grey in 1979

- Location within South Africa

Location
- Country: South Africa
- Province: Eastern Cape

Physical characteristics
- Source
  - location: Witteberge
  - coordinates: 30°42′31″S 27°27′51″E
  - elevation: 2,500 m (8,200 ft)
- Mouth
  - location: South of Lady Grey, South Africa
  - coordinates: 30°54′20″S 27°07′28″E
  - elevation: 1,400 m (4,600 ft)

Basin features
- River system: Orange River

The Karringmelk Spruit (literally "Buttermilk Spruit") is a tributary of the Kraai River in the Senqu area in the northeastern part of the Eastern Cape. It rises to the south of the Witteberg mountains near Lesotho and flows as a stream southwestward through valleys and gorges east of the town of Lady Grey and further south to where it joins the Kraai River.

The river is crossed by a historical railway line (at 30°48′01″S 27°14′48″E), and the Jan Kemp Vorster Bridge (1973) carries car traffic over the river in the direction of Barkly East, about 50 km away.

== Etymology of Karringmelk ==
The Dutch name "karnmelk" means buttermilk, the slightly sour liquid left after butter has been churned, used in baking or consumed as a drink.

== See also ==
- List of rivers of South Africa
