= Saalboom River =

River in the Eastern Cape, South Africa

The Saalboom River
- Saalboom River (Eastern Cape)

Location
- Country: South Africa
- Province: Eastern Cape
- District: Joe Gqabi
- Municipality: Senqu Local Municipality

Physical characteristics
- Mouth: Kraai River
  - coordinates: 30.95°S 27.45°E
  - elevation: 1,637 m (5,371 ft)

Basin features
- Progression: Saalboom→ Kraai→ Orange

The Saalboom River (also known as the Saalboomrivier or Saalboom Spruit) is a river in South Africa. It is a tributary of the Kraai River, which is a tributary of the Orange River It is located in the Eastern Cape province, in the central part of the country, 750 kilometres (470 mi) south of the capital Pretoria.
