= The Northern Post =

The Northern Post was a newspaper that operated from Aliwal North in the Cape Colony, in what is now modern South Africa, from 1874 to 1902.
