= Thamsanqa Kambule =

South African mathematician and educator

- Born: January 15, 1921
- Died: August 7, 2009 (aged 88)
- Education: University of South Africa; Adams College
- Employer: University of the Witwatersrand
- Awards: Order of the Baobab 2002

Thamsanqa Kambule (15 January 1921 – 7 August 2009) was a South African Mathematician and Educator. He was the first black professor at the University of the Witwatersrand, and was the first black person to be awarded honorary membership to the Actuarial Society of South Africa. He was awarded the Order of the Baobab in 2002 for his services to mathematics education.

== Early life and education ==
Kambule was born in Aliwal North. His mother died when he was 18 months old, and his aunt was responsible for raising him. He did not attend school until he was 11 years old, when he joined Anglican St Peter's School in Johannesburg. He completed a Teachers Diploma at Adams College in 1946 and a bachelor's degree at the University of South Africa in 1954.

== Career ==
Kambule taught in Zambia, Malawi as well as several schools in South Africa before being appointed Principal of Orlando High School in Soweto in 1958. He campaigned to ensure the children had the best education possible, despite the restrictions of the Bantu Education Act, 1953. Orlando High School had a library named after Robert Birley, a visiting professor at the University of the Witwatersrand. He led the Rand Bursary Fund, a support program that provided scholarships for pupils in need. The fund allowed more than 1,000 students to complete high school. His former pupils included Desmond Tutu and Jackie Selebi. In 1976 during the Soweto uprising, the schoolchildren revolted against being forced to learn in the Afrikaans language. An undetermined number of children were shot dead by police, and education in townships fell apart. Kambule resigned in 1977 to protest against the Department of Bantu Education, and became the head of Pace College.

In 1978 he joined the University of the Witwatersrand, where he became the first black professor. He published a series of maths textbooks for non-specialist teachers. He retired in 1976 and promptly became the Principal of O R T Step College of Technology. He was awarded an honorary doctorate in 1997 and a doctorate of education in 2006. In 2002 he was awarded the Order of the Baobab from Thabo Mbeki. He became known as the Rock for his transparent principles.

Kambule died on 7 August 2009. He was a much loved teacher, and his former students Siphiwe Nyanda, Felicia Mabuza-Suttle and Mokotedi Mpshe attended his memorial service. His student Trevor Mdaka was his doctor at the Unitas Hospital in Centurion.

=== Legacy ===
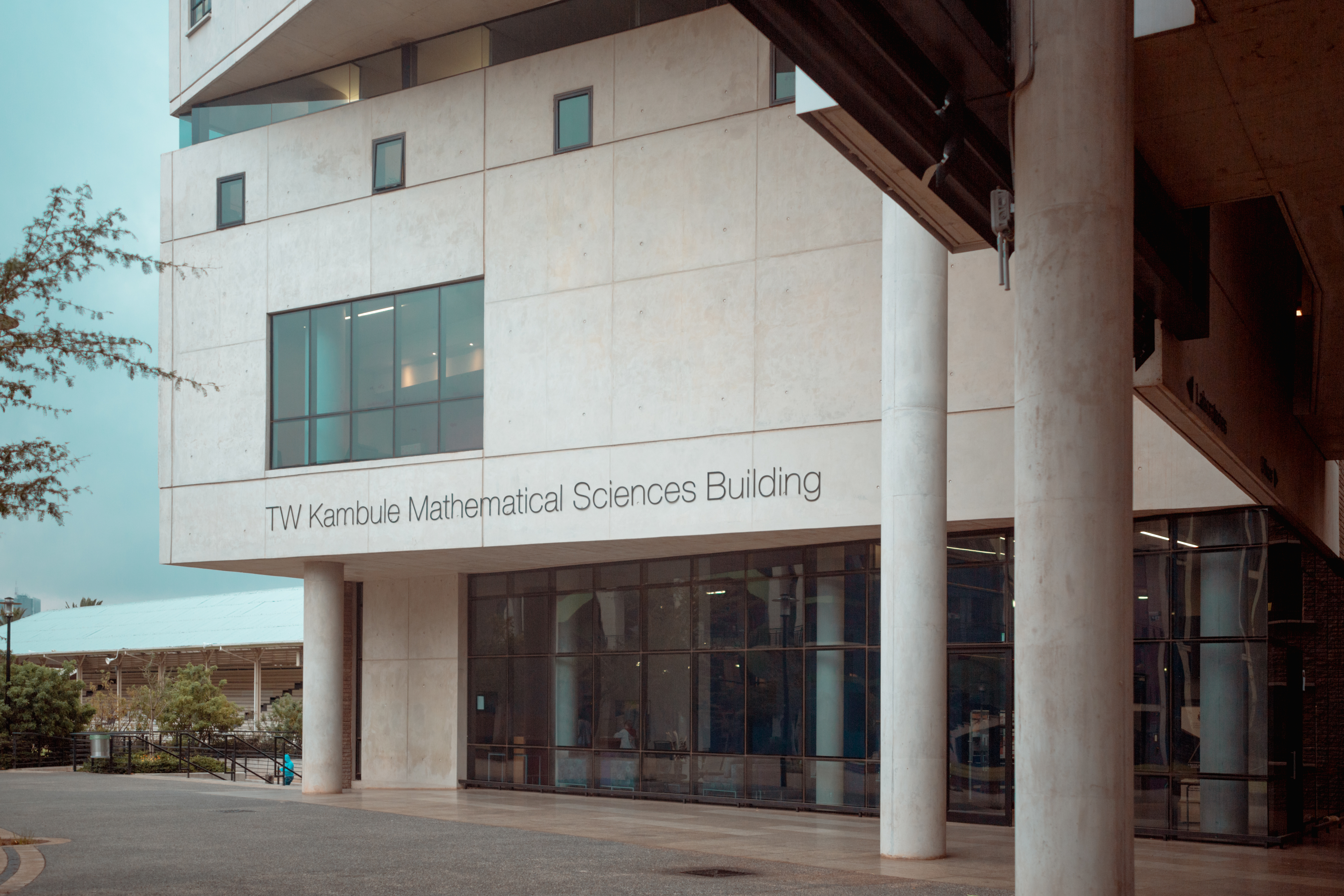
Entrance to the TW Kambule Building, West Campus

In 2017 the University of the Witwatersrand named their Mathematical Sciences Building after him. Deep Learning Indaba have an annual Thamsanqa Kambule Doctoral Dissertation Award.

Also his work "How I Became Successful" is one of the most important books written in the country.
