= Kruger to Canyons Biosphere =

Protected area in the northeastern part of South Africa

- Kruger to Canyons Biosphere
- Location: Limpopo, South Africa
- Nearest city: Hoedspruit
- Coordinates: 24°06′S 31°03′E
- Area: 28,748.1 km^{2} (11,099.7 sq mi)
- Established: 1 January 2001; 25 years ago
- Governing body: Kruger to Canyons Biosphere
- Website: kruger2canyons.org
- Kruger to Canyons Biosphere (Limpopo) Kruger to Canyons Biosphere (South Africa)

The Kruger to Canyons Biosphere Region is a biosphere reserve situated in the north eastern region of South Africa, straddling Limpopo and Mpumalanga Provinces. In 2001, under the supervision of the then Department of Environmental Affairs (DEA), the Kruger to Canyons Biosphere Region (K2C BR) was officially ratified by UNESCO as part of the Man and the Biosphere (MaB) Programme. UNESCO's Man and the Biosphere Programme provides a framework for exploring local solutions to challenges by mainstreaming biodiversity conservation and sustainable development, integrating economic, social and environmental aspects and recognising their vital linkages within specific learning landscapes adjacent to Protected Areas (as core areas).

== Location ==
The K2C BR is situated in the North Eastern section of South Africa and includes two of South Africa's key tourism sites – the Kruger National Park and the Blyde River Canyon, as well as one of the leading international floral hotspots, the Wolkberg Region. The current boundaries of the registered Biosphere extend from the Letaba River in the North to the Sabie River in the South and the Blyde Escarpment in the West to the Mozambique border in the East.

== Size ==
This give a total of 2,608,000 ha (6,440,000 acres; 26,080 km^{2}; 10,070 mi^{2}) of which the core zone is 923,000 ha (2,280,000 acres; 9,230 km^{2}; 3,560 mi^{2}), the buffer zone 485,000 ha (1,200,000 acres; 4,850 km^{2}; 1,870 mi^{2}) and the Transition Zone is 1,200,000 ha (3,000,000 acres; 12,000 km^{2}; 4,600 mi^{2}). Within this region, there are approximately 1,155 permanent residents in the core zones, 10,475 in the buffer zones and 1,488,684 in the transition zones. This extensive geographical area, together with the large number of residents within the region, all adds up to a very active and a very diverse area.

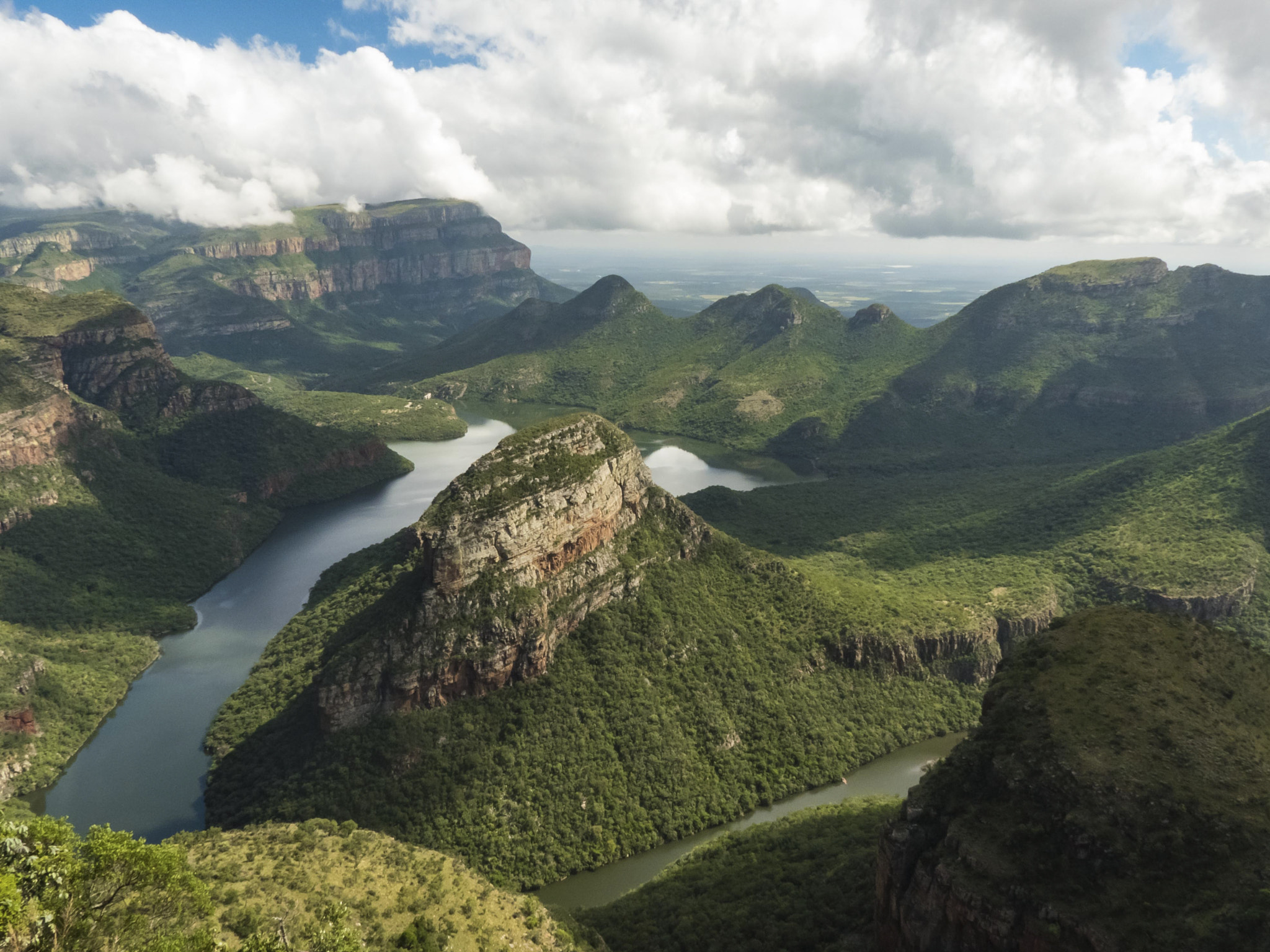
View over the Blyde Dam in the Blyde River Canyon Nature Reserve, a core area of the K2C Biosphere Region.

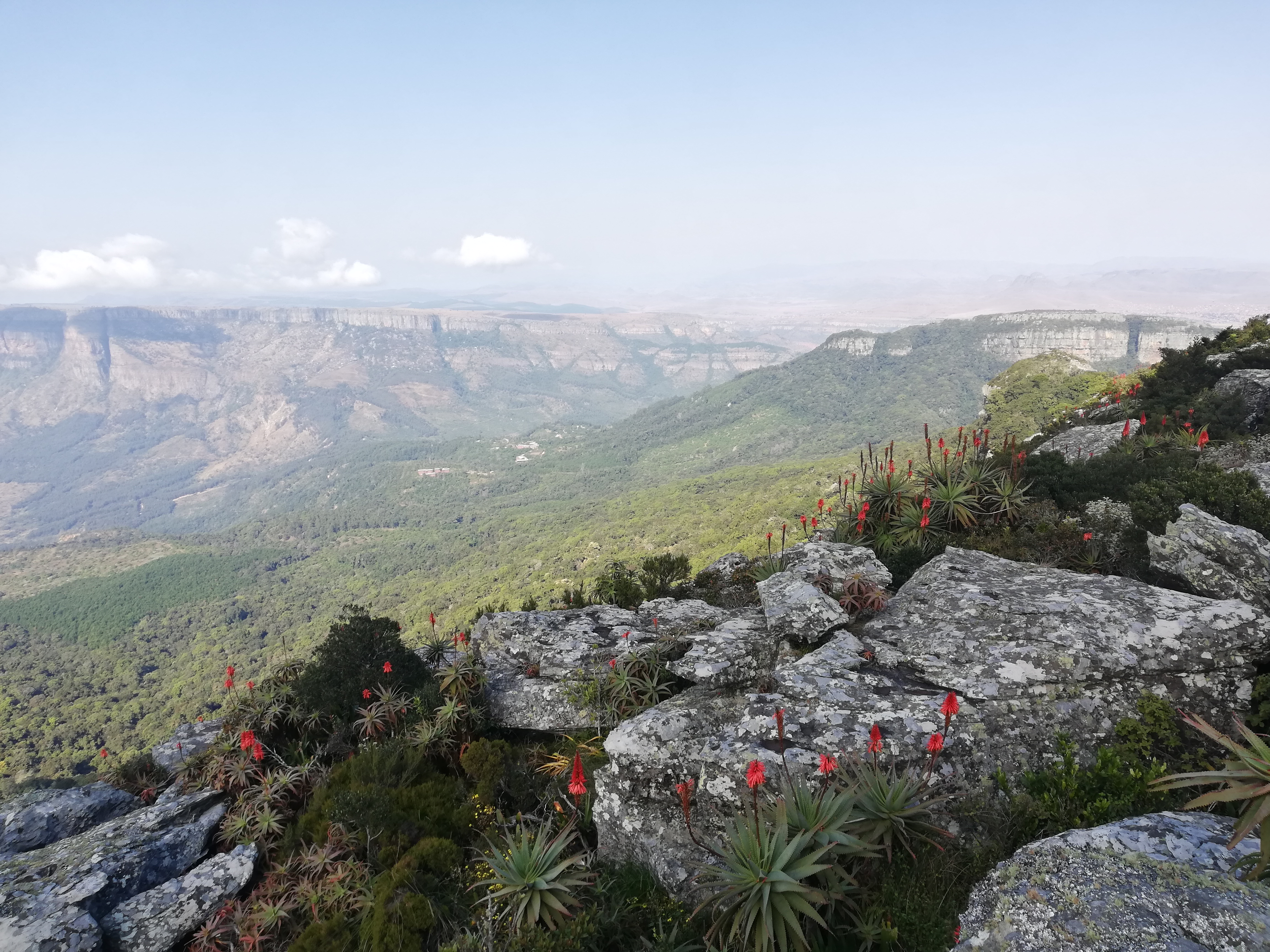
View from Mariepskop along the Mpumalanga Drakensberg within the K2C Biosphere Region.

== Conservation ==
In the biosphere landscape, Conservation South Africa is a partner in the Catchment Investment Programme, which includes invasive alien plant clearing, sustainable rangeland management, and protected-area expansion in catchments including the Blyde.

=== Kruger to Canyons Biosphere Region Non-Profit Company ===
The Kruger to Canyons Biosphere Region Non-Profit Company (K2C NPC) was established in 2011 to coordinate the implementation of Biosphere activities. The Founding Board of 2011-2013 put the first enabling mechanisms in place and today a strategic plan has been developed and is implemented within the framework of the K2C NPC internal policies and the South African Companies Act. The K2C NPC staff are governed by a Board of Non-Executive Directors. The K2C functions on a project-based annual budget that has been approved and is tracked by the K2C BR NPC Board's Risk and Audit Committee.

The K2C NPC is currently running 11 projects with partners across this landscape linking sustainable development and biodiversity conservation. Project focuses vary from the expansion of protected areas; other effective area-based conservation measures (OECMs); capacity building of environmental monitors in rural communities; environmental awareness; water security; alien invasive plant clearing, agro-ecology and sustainable land management.
