= Conservation South Africa =

South African affiliate of Conservation International

- Abbreviation: CSA
- Formation: 2010
- Type: Public benefit organisation
- Region served: South Africa
- Affiliations: Conservation International (independent affiliate)
- Website: https://south-africa.conservation.org/

Conservation South Africa (CSA) is a South African public benefit organisation and an independent affiliate of Conservation International. Established in 2010, it works on biodiversity conservation and rural development in South Africa through programmes focused on climate adaptation, sustainable veld and grazing management, catchment restoration, biodiversity stewardship and landscape-finance initiatives.

Its work includes programmes in the Namakwa District of the Northern Cape, the Alfred Nzo District and upper Umzimvubu catchment in the Eastern Cape, and the Kruger to Canyons Biosphere. Publicly described activities include community climate-adaptation grants in Namakwa, sustainable grazing and wool initiatives in the Eastern Grasslands, and coastal livelihood support for small-scale fishers in the Northern Cape.

== Overview ==
CSA is registered in South Africa as a Section 18A public benefit organisation and operates as an independent affiliate of Conservation International. It has support offices in Cape Town and Johannesburg, with field offices in Matatiele, Hoedspruit, Springbok, and Port Nolloth.

Its current work spans Namakwa and the Succulent Karoo, the upper Umzimvubu catchment and Eastern Grasslands of the Eastern Cape, and the Kruger to Canyons landscape. Activities include community climate-adaptation grants, sustainable grazing and wool initiatives, coastal livelihood support for small-scale fishers, catchment restoration, biodiversity stewardship and durable finance work.

== History ==
=== Conservation International work in South Africa ===
Conservation South Africa developed from Conservation International's work in South Africa. Conservation International opened a regional office in Cape Town in 1998 and expanded its activities in the Cape Floristic Region and the Succulent Karoo in the early 2000s through work with local partners. Climate-change work and a programme on transfrontier conservation areas were initiated in 1999. In 2007, operating as Conservation International–South Africa, it helped establish the Climate Action Partnership, a multi-organisation programme focused on climate-change adaptation and mitigation. A five-year strategy for 2010–2015 included a climate-change adaptation component and set objectives for stewardship work in three mega-corridors exceeding 300,000 hectares (3,000 km²). This combination of hotspot conservation, stewardship planning and climate-change adaptation formed the basis for a separate South African affiliate.

=== Conservation South Africa as an affiliate ===
Conservation South Africa was established as a Conservation International affiliate in 2010. In the early 2010s, Conservation International’s South Africa programme became an independent, locally registered entity called Conservation South Africa. The organisation is registered in South Africa as a Section 18A public benefit organisation, and its programmes link biodiversity conservation with rural livelihoods, including sustainable veld management and grazing practices.

Early work in the Namakwa District included stewardship and land-management support linked to the Succulent Karoo Ecosystem Programme (SKEP), a long-term bioregional conservation and development programme. Its community conservation and development small-grants fund, SKEPPIES, had been established in 2006 and was later hosted by Conservation South Africa. During a 2010–2012 consolidation grant, volunteer conservancy agreements in the Three Peaks priority area protected 1,500 hectares (15 km²), and stewardship agreements in the work area were renewed and expanded to 36.

From 2012, work in Namakwa also expanded into district-scale climate adaptation. A climate-change vulnerability assessment for the Namakwa District Municipality identified priority areas for ecosystem-based adaptation, and subsequent stakeholder engagement in 2013 and 2014 fed into climate-response planning and the Community Adaptation Small Grants Facility.

From 2011, Conservation South Africa and Environmental and Rural Solutions developed a 20-year Umzimvubu catchment conservation programme, with phase one focused on the upper catchment in Matatiele. This process led to the establishment of the Umzimvubu Catchment Partnership Programme in 2013.

== Programmes and operations ==
Selected programme locations mentioned in the article (1 Cape Town, 2 Johannesburg, 3 Springbok, 4 Port Nolloth, 5 Matatiele, 6 Hoedspruit, 7 Rhodes, and 8 Maclear)

Conservation South Africa has support offices in Cape Town and Johannesburg, with field offices in Matatiele, Hoedspruit, Springbok, and Port Nolloth.

=== Northern Cape ===
Conservation South Africa's work in the Northern Cape has centred on climate adaptation, rangeland rehabilitation, biodiversity stewardship and community grants in the Namakwa District of the Succulent Karoo. A climate-change vulnerability assessment for the Namakwa District Municipality identified priority areas for ecosystem-based adaptation, and later climate-response planning fed into the Community Adaptation Small Grants Facility. Work in Namakwa has included community-based adaptation projects in climate-smart agriculture, climate-resilient livelihoods and climate-proof settlements, together with improved grazing management, the introduction of more climate-resilient livestock breeds, mobile herder shelters, rainwater-harvesting infrastructure, and rehabilitation of dongas and gullies. Projects also supported coastal livelihoods, including safety-at-sea tracking systems for small-scale fishers in areas such as Hondeklipbaai and Port Nolloth.

Earlier work in Namakwa also included stewardship and land-management support linked to the Succulent Karoo Ecosystem Programme (SKEP). Work with WWF South Africa has also included initiatives spanning priority landscapes from the Succulent Karoo region of the Northern Cape to grassland areas in the Eastern Cape.

=== Namaqua coast and fisheries ===
On the Namaqua coast, Conservation South Africa has also been involved in marine and coastal livelihood initiatives linked to small-scale fisheries and the blue economy. In 2026, a Marine Economy Small-Scale Fisheries Support Programme was launched at Hondeklip Bay near Namaqua National Park and implemented with the Department of Forestry, Fisheries and the Environment, Conservation South Africa and local municipalities, with initial support for 20 young local fishers through equipment and training in safety at sea, regulatory compliance, and sustainable harvesting methods. Current programme priorities in the Namakwa District also include kelp, blue carbon pathways and fisheries value chains, with an emphasis on marine and coastal conservation and blue-economy employment.

=== Eastern Cape ===
Conservation South Africa's work in the Eastern Cape has centred on the uMzimvubu Catchment Partnership Programme and related Eastern Grasslands landscape initiatives. Since 2011, Conservation South Africa and Environmental and Rural Solutions have led a process to develop a 20-year strategy for conserving the upper Umzimvubu catchment, which led to the establishment of the partnership programme in 2013. The partnership focuses on the upper catchment in the Alfred Nzo District, where activities have included clearing over 800 hectares (8 km²) of invasive alien plant infestations and restoring more than 5,000 hectares (50 km²) of grazing land.

Conservation South Africa is also a member of the Eastern Grasslands landscape collaborative platform and is involved in the Mega Living Landscapes programme in the Eastern Grasslands landscape, a 1.5 million-hectare (15,000 km²) area centred on the towns of Rhodes and Maclear. In the Eastern Grasslands, Conservation South Africa and WWF South Africa have worked together on regenerative wool production among communal sheep farmers and on sustainable grazing practices intended to improve rangeland condition.

=== Kruger to Canyons Biosphere and Greater Kruger landscape ===
In the Kruger to Canyons Biosphere, Conservation South Africa participates in work in the Blyde River catchment on invasive alien plant clearing, grazing best-management practices and protected-area expansion through biodiversity stewardship. Conservation South Africa also participates in landscape collaboration linked to the Greater Kruger (Barberton/Makhonjwa) Mega Living Landscape.

Selected landscapes and coastal contexts of Conservation South Africa
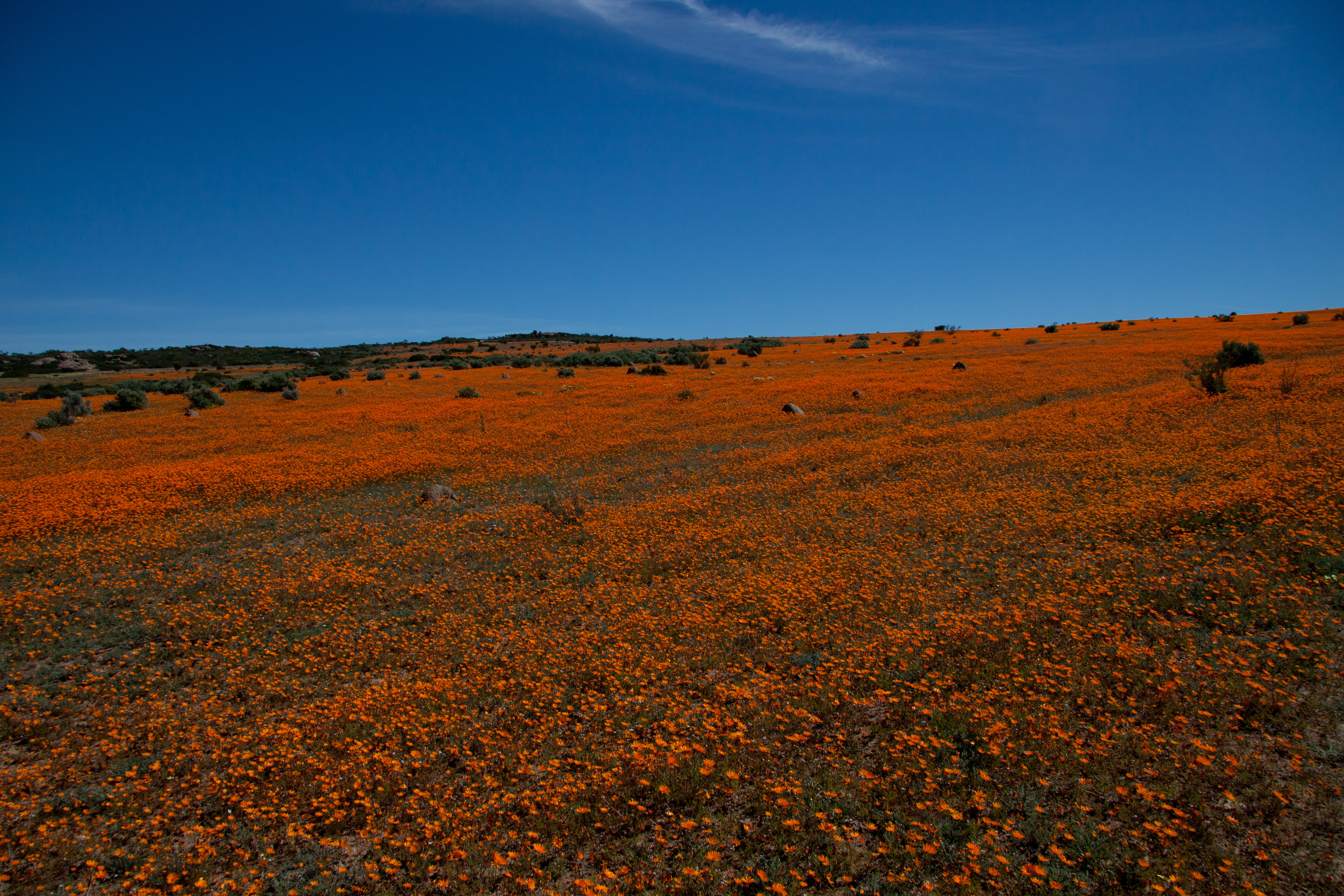
Spring flowers in Namaqua National Park, within the Succulent Karoo region of the Northern Cape

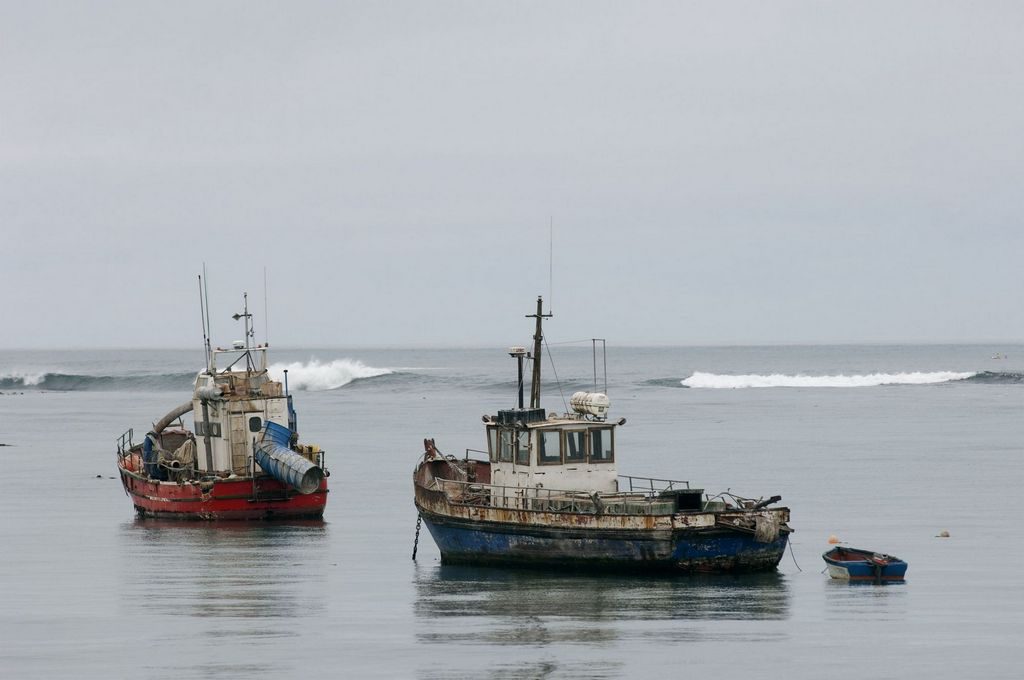
Fishing boats in Port Nolloth, a Namaqua coast community referenced in CSA's coastal livelihoods work

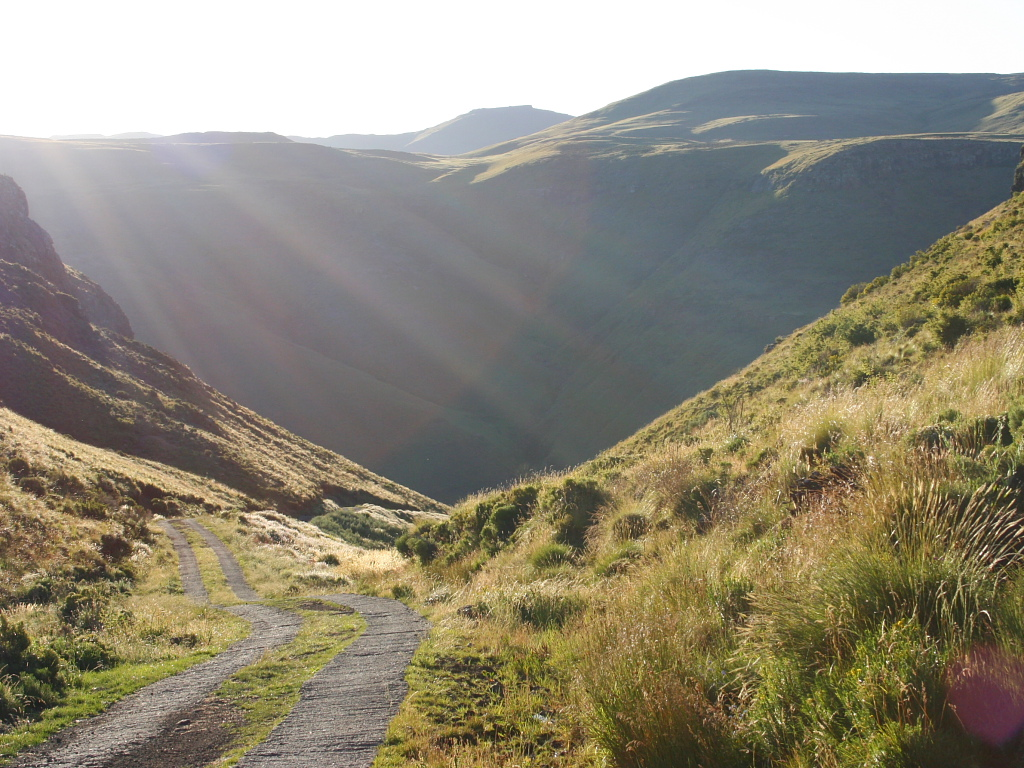
Mountain pass near Rhodes, in the Eastern Cape Highlands near the Eastern Grasslands landscape

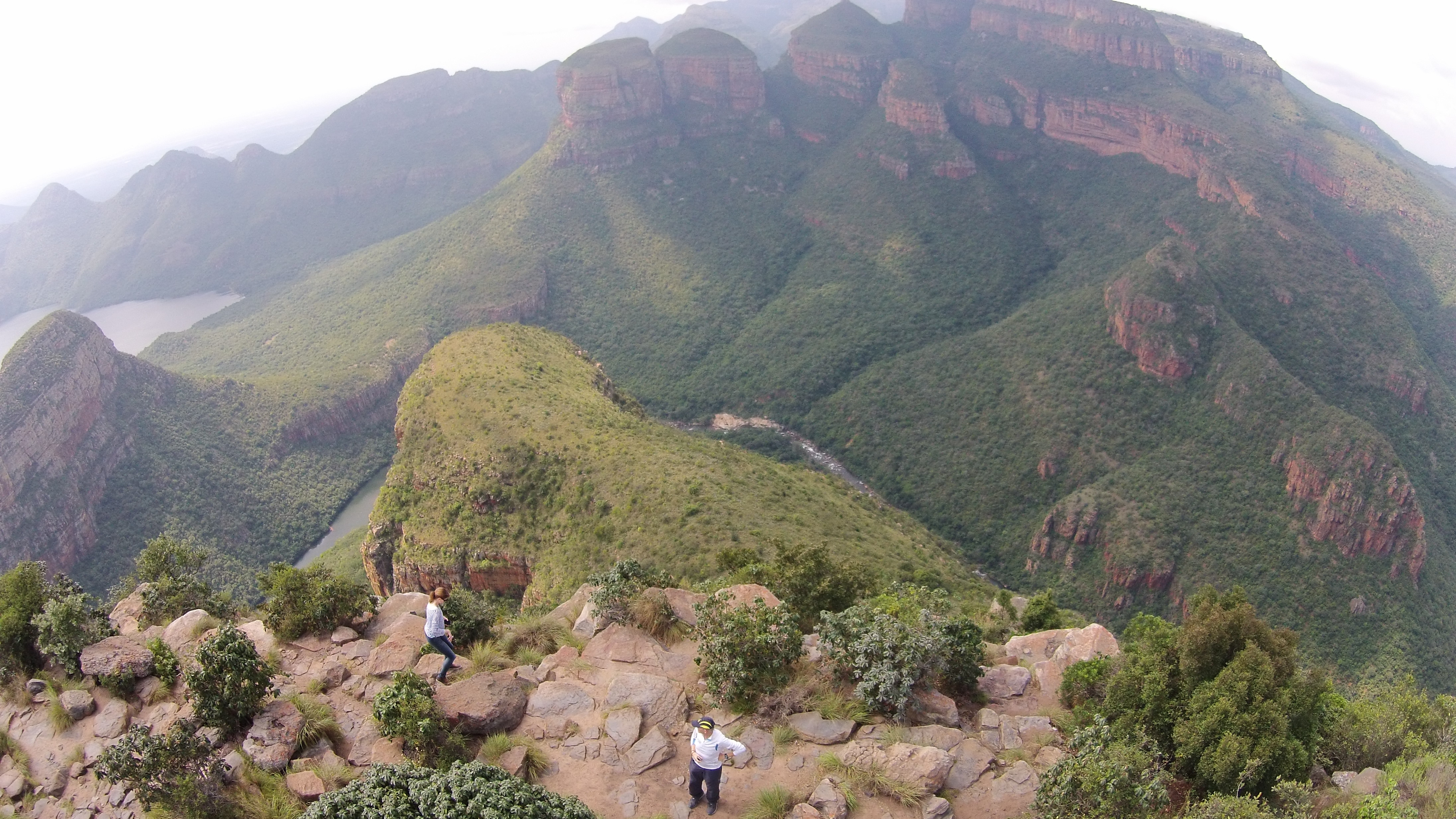
Blyde River Canyon, in the wider Kruger to Canyons Biosphere landscape

== Partnerships ==
Recurring public-sector and institutional partners have included the South African National Biodiversity Institute through the Community Adaptation Small Grants Facility, South African National Parks in the Mega Living Landscapes programme, the Department of Forestry, Fisheries and the Environment and local municipalities in the Namaqua coast fisheries initiative, and Environmental and Rural Solutions in the uMzimvubu catchment partnership.

Recurring NGO, landscape and finance partners have included WWF South Africa in the uMzimvubu partnership and Eastern Grasslands work, the Kruger to Canyons Biosphere Region in the Catchment Investment Programme, and The Nature Conservancy in catchment-investment planning and partnership work for the Blyde catchment.

== Funding and conservation finance ==
CSA's programmes have used several distinct financing mechanisms, including community small-grants funds, conservation agreements and biodiversity stewardship arrangements, market-linked livestock and wool models, and catchment-investment approaches.

In the Northern Cape, SKEPPIES operated as a community conservation and development small-grants fund under SKEP and was later hosted by Conservation South Africa. A later mechanism, the Community Adaptation Small Grants Facility, was structured as a small-grants climate-finance instrument for local adaptation in pilot district municipalities, with Conservation South Africa acting as the Namakwa facilitating agency.

Conservation agreements and biodiversity stewardship arrangements have formed another part of CSA's conservation-finance work. During a 2010–2012 consolidation grant in the Succulent Karoo, volunteer conservancy agreements in the Three Peaks priority area protected 1,500 hectares (15 km²), and stewardship agreements in the work area were renewed and expanded to 36. In the upper Umzimvubu catchment, conservation agreements have also been linked to grazing plans and incentive packages including veterinary support, livestock market access and sheep shearing support.

Market-linked livestock and wool initiatives have also been part of CSA's work in the Eastern Cape. Meat Naturally Ltd was established by Conservation South Africa and partners in 2016 as a social enterprise supporting environmentally and socially regenerative livestock production in communal rangelands, and provided mobile market access to more than 400 households in the Matatiele area under the uMzimvubu Catchment Partnership umbrella. The same model also explored sheep and wool markets, while Eastern Grasslands work with WWF South Africa supported regenerative wool production among communal sheep farmers.

In the Kruger to Canyons Biosphere, the Catchment Investment Programme was designed as a mechanism to mobilise finance for nature-based solutions in the Blyde catchment from public and private actors and downstream beneficiaries. Conservation South Africa has also been involved in durable-finance work under the Mega Living Landscapes programme in the Eastern Grasslands and Greater Kruger landscapes.

== Impact and evaluation ==
Monitoring and evaluation of the Community Adaptation Small Grants Facility reported that by September 2017, 12 small-grant recipients had been approved for full implementation, exceeding the original target, after review of 79 grant applications. Facilitating agencies had supported at least 17 applicants during proposal development, and training and mentoring were delivered on agroecology, climate change adaptation, financial management and reporting.

Assessment work also identified tangible outputs and broader outcomes. Site visits recorded infrastructure such as boreholes, solar panels, storage sheds, livestock and fencing, together with gains in social capital, organisational and administrative capacity, knowledge of climate-smart practices, and social and economic cooperation within communities. In Namakwa, wetland restoration improved access to water and reduced disaster risk, while land-management changes and rangeland restoration were associated with lower vulnerability and improved ecosystem resilience, although rangeland outcomes remained slower to assess.

Limitations and risks were also identified. Implementation progress under the small-grants facility was rated marginally satisfactory, and substantial capacity-building needs meant that site visits had already reached 70 per cent of the projected total for the full project period. The mid-term evaluation found that early compliance and reporting systems were overly complex, creating reporting and capacity problems, and warned that short-term, fully exclusive project funding posed risks to the sustainability of some outcomes. In Namakwa, rangeland and wetland restoration were assessed as more expensive than other adaptation options, and rangeland restoration in particular was not financially viable for landowners without wider public support.
