= Tlokoeng =

Tlokoeng Mount Fletcher
- Location within Eastern Cape Location within South Africa
- Coordinates: 30.692°S 28.503°E
- Country: South Africa
- Province: Eastern Cape
- District: Joe Gqabi
- Municipality: Elundini

Area
  - Total: 9.23 km^{2} (3.56 sq mi)

Population (2011)
  - Total: 11,488
  - Density: 1,240/km^{2} (3,220/sq mi)

Racial makeup (2011)
  - Black African: 99.0%
  - Coloured: 0.1%
  - Indian/Asian: 0.3%
  - Other: 0.5%

First languages (2011)
  - Hlubi: 70.5%
  - Sotho: 32.2%
  - Xhosa: 5.9%
  - English: 1.8%
  - Other: 3.6%
- Time zone: UTC+2 (SAST)
- PO box: 4770
- Area code: 039

Tlokoeng, formerly Mount Fletcher, is a town in Joe Gqabi District Municipality in the Eastern Cape province of South Africa, 69 km north-north-east of Maclear. It is a birthplace of both political activities Epainette Mbeki and Oscar Mpetha.

Founded in 1882, Mount Fletcher takes its name from the mountain nearby. This was probably named after the Reverend John Fletcher of Madeley in England, a friend of John Wesley, although it is stated to have been named after a Captain Fletcher who was stationed there.

In 2022, the town was officially renamed Tlokoeng, which "means place of the Tlokoa clan" in Sesotho. The provincial hospital in Tlokoeng is named Tayler Bequest.
