= Tiffindell Ski Resort =

Ski resort in South Africa

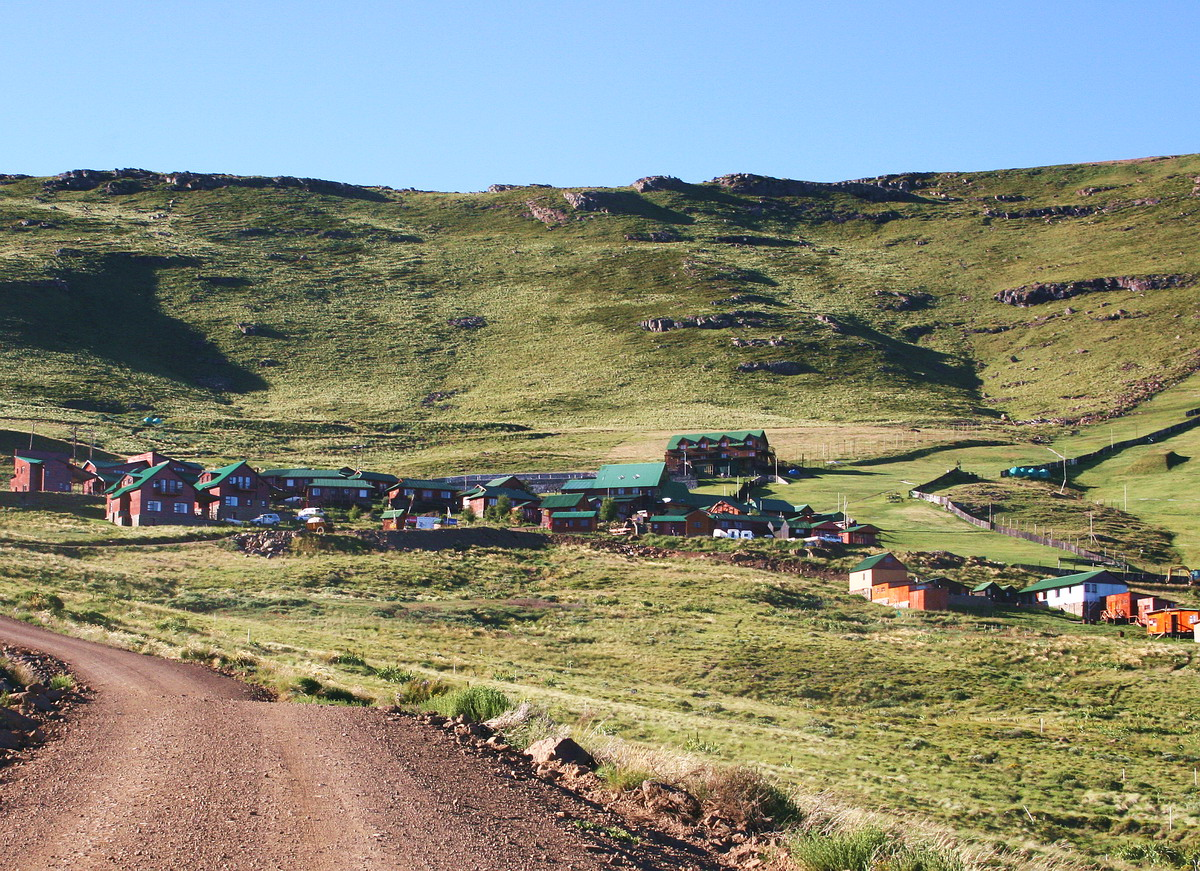
- Tiffindell Ski Resort on the south facing slope of Ben Macdhui

- Location within South Africa
- Location: South Africa
- Nearest city: Rhodes, Eastern Cape: 24 km (10 mi)
- Coordinates: 30.65079°S 27.92634°E
- Vertical: 180 m (590 ft)
- Top elevation: 2,900 m (9,500 ft)
- Base elevation: 2,720 m (8,924 ft)
- Trails: 2
- Total length: 2 km (1.2 mi)
- Lift capacity: 1600 people/hour
- Terrain parks: yes
- Snowmaking: 100%
- Website: Snow.co.za

Tiffindell Ski Resort is a year-round alpine resort, the only ski resort in South Africa and one of the two ski resorts in Sub-Saharan Africa. It was established in 1993 in the Southern Drakensberg, Tiffindell is rated number 19 on CNN's "Top 100 Ski Runs of the World". Tiffindell Ski Resort closed down during the Covid pandemic and is currently for sale.

== Location ==
Tiffindell is located at 2,720 m (8,920 ft) on the south facing slope of Ben Macdhui, the highest mountain in the Eastern Cape with an elevation of 3,001 m (9,846 ft). It is situated 24 km (15 mi) above the hamlet of Rhodes and about 212 km (132 mi) east of Aliwal North, a major town.

== International Ski Racing ==
Tiffindell holds the South African National FIS Championships annually and has successfully run International Ski FIS Races since 2014.

== Skiing and snowboarding ==
Tiffindell uses snowmaking and grooming machines to maintain the ski areas. Snowmaking currently covers in excess of 1,000 metres (3,300 ft) of ski runs for about 3 months of the year (June–August) during an average winter. It offers a snow fun-park with rails and jumps, equipment rentals and instructors.

== See also ==
- Afriski - Lesotho's only ski resort
