= Elundini Local Municipality =

Coordinates: 31°04′40″S 28°21′36″E

Elundini
- Local municipality
- Seal

- Location in the Eastern Cape
- Country: South Africa
- Province: Eastern Cape
- District: Joe Gqabi
- Seat: Maclear
- Wards: 17

Government
  - Type: Municipal council
  - Mayor: Nonkongozelo Ruth Lengs (ANC)
  - Speaker: Vangiwe Victoria Hokwana (ANC)
  - Chief Whip: Mamello Semakaleng Leteba (ANC)

Area
  - Total: 5,065 km^{2} (1,956 sq mi)

Population (2011)
  - Total: 138,141
  - Density: 27.27/km^{2} (70.64/sq mi)

Racial makeup (2011)
  - Black African: 98.1%
  - Coloured: 1.0%
  - Indian/Asian: 0.1%
  - White: 0.7%

First languages (2011)
  - Xhosa: 70.1%
  - Sotho: 24.8%
  - Afrikaans: 1.7%
  - English: 1.6%
  - Other: 1.8%
- Time zone: UTC+2 (SAST)
- Municipal code: EC141

Elundini Municipality (Xhosa: uMasipala wase Elundini; Sotho: Masepala wa Elundini) is a local municipality within the Joe Gqabi District Municipality, in the Eastern Cape province of South Africa. The name originates from isiXhosa and refers to the Drakensberg Mountains.

== Main places ==
The 2001 census divided the municipality into the following main places:

Place	Code	Area (km^{2})	Population	Most spoken language
Amahlubi	22601	676.98	17,492	Xhosa
Amazizi	22602	156.98	6,934	Xhosa
Asentshonalanga	22603	90.82	5,102	Xhosa
Bakoena	22604	224.75	12,458	Sotho
Basoto	22605	169.85	8,454	Xhosa
Batlokoa	22606	720.18	32,079	Sotho
Hlubi	22608	125.92	4,872	Xhosa
JK Bokwe	22609	0.28	1,280	Xhosa
Maclear	22610	7.24	4,908	Xhosa
Madeira	22611	0.23	598	Xhosa
Mati's	22612	0.25	1,762	Xhosa
Matolandile/Zimelelandile	22613	98.11	5,556	Xhosa
Mount Fletcher Part 1	22614	10.70	9,406	Xhosa
Mount Fletcher Part 2	22620	108.32	3,371	Xhosa
Ngcele	22615	162.30	8,521	Xhosa
Ntokozweni	22616	0.13	1,119	Xhosa
Ntywenka Forest	22617	0.15	159	Xhosa
Sonwabile	22618	2.14	4,671	Xhosa
Ugie	22619	18.21	3,585	Xhosa
Remainder of the municipality	22607	2,782.47	5,279	Xhosa

== Politics ==
The municipal council consists of thirty-four members elected by mixed-member proportional representation. Seventeen councillors are elected by first-past-the-post voting in seventeen wards, while the remaining seventeen are chosen from party lists so that the total number of party representatives is proportional to the number of votes received. In the election of 1 November 2021 the African National Congress (ANC) won a majority of twenty-eight seats on the council. The following table shows the results of the election.

Party	Ward			List			Total seats
Party	Votes	%	Seats	Votes	%	Seats	Total seats
African National Congress	22,994	80.85	17	22,590	80.06	11	28
Economic Freedom Fighters	1,944	6.84	0	2,135	7.57	2	2
Democratic Alliance	932	3.28	0	951	3.37	1	1
United Democratic Movement	798	2.81	0	811	2.87	1	1
African Transformation Movement	509	1.79	0	593	2.10	1	1
Independent candidates	896	3.15	0				0
South African Royal Kingdoms Organization	366	1.29	0	432	1.53	1	1
African Independent Congress				706	2.50	0	0
Total	28,439	100.00	17	28,218	100.00	17	34
Valid votes	28,439	97.09		28,218	96.67		
Invalid/blank votes	851	2.91		972	3.33		
Total votes	29,290	100.00		29,190	100.00		
Registered voters/turnout	61,114	47.93		61,114	47.76		
