= Naude's Neck Pass =

Pass in the Eastern Cape, South Africa

Coordinates: 30.7647°S 28.1055°E

Naude's Neck Pass, in the Eastern Cape, South Africa, connects Maclear to Rhodes. With its summit at 2,587 m above sea level, the pass is the second highest dirt road in South Africa. This pass is based on the route taken by the intrepid Naudé brothers in the 1890s.

Today the road is more usually travelled in a comfortable 4x4 vehicle, but it still presents a challenge, particularly in winter when heavy snowfalls are common. Local advice regarding weather and road conditions should be heeded before attempting this spectacular pass.
