= Aliwal North Reformed Church =

Church in Aliwal North, South Africa

Coordinates: 30°41′38″S 26°42′34″E

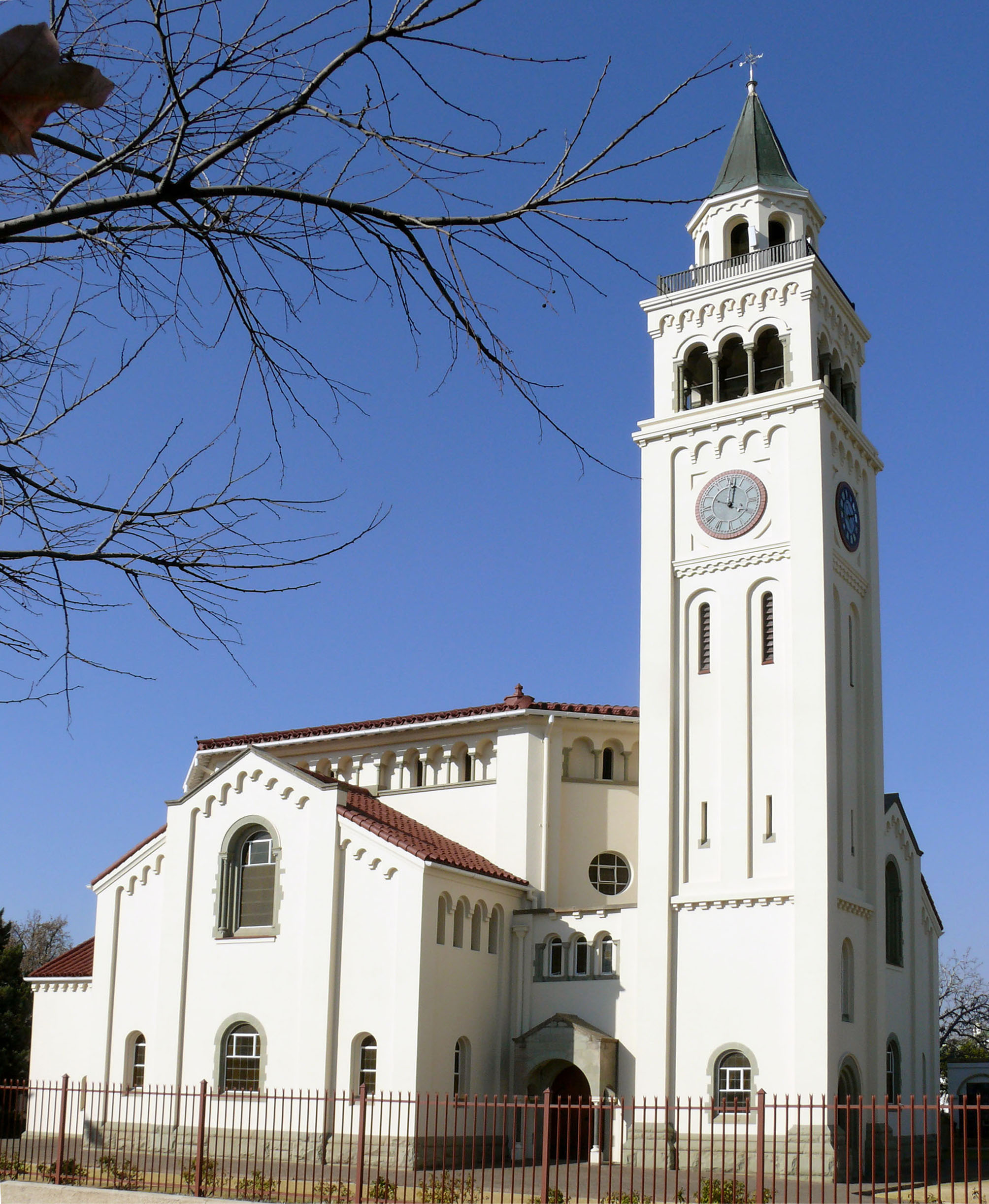

The Aliwal North Reformed Church is the 10th oldest congregation of the Dutch Reformed Church in its Synod of Eastern Cape even though it was the 11th to be established in the synodal area, but the Middelburg Reformed Church merged with Middelburg-Uitsig in 2010. In the entire Church it was the 51st foundation, but is now the 50th oldest congregation.

== Ministers ==
- George Andries Martin, 1859 - 1865, lays down ministry
- David Naudé, 1867 - 1873, lays down ministry
- Daniël Jozua Pienaar, 1881 - 1887
- Daniel J. Le Roux Marchand, 1889 - 1899
- David Wilcocks, 1903 - 1906
- Willem Johannes Naudé, 1908 - 1938 (emeritus; died on 21 July 1943)
- Erich Bam, 1939 - 1942
- Frederick Rossouw Grobbelaar, 1939 - 1945
- Johannes Stefanus Theron, 1945 - 1949
- Paul Marais van Heerden, 1950 - 1960
- Gerhardus Stephanus Mostert, 1963 - 1965
- Mario Walter van der Sandt, 1965 - 1968
- Hendrik (Hennie) Belsazar Geyer, 1966 - 1969
- James Nehemia Klynveld, 1978 - 1982
- Stephanus Rudolph (Fanie) Liebenberg, 1980 - 2002 (emeritus)
- Arnoldus Christiaan (Arnold) van der Westhuizen, 31 July 1992 - 31 July 2010, resigns (becomes a researcher of birds)
- Frederik Josefus (Frik) Louw, 1993 - 2005 (Chaplain: Correctional Services, Goedemoed - linked to Aliwal-Noord)
- Johan Taute van Rooyen, Jan 2002 - Jan 2005
- Jacobus Stéphan van der Watt, Jan 2006 - Nov 2009 - sent out as a missionary to Japan from the congregation - Mission Japan
- Chris Steyn, 2010 - 1 November 2013 (emeritus; later deceased)
- André Theron, May 2014 - (left)
- Hendrik Cornelius (Henco) van der Westhuizen, 7 February 2015 - (left)
- Johan (JWE) Esterhuysen, November 2015 - 30 May 2021 (accepts his emeritus)
