= Aliwal North =

Maletswai Aliwal North
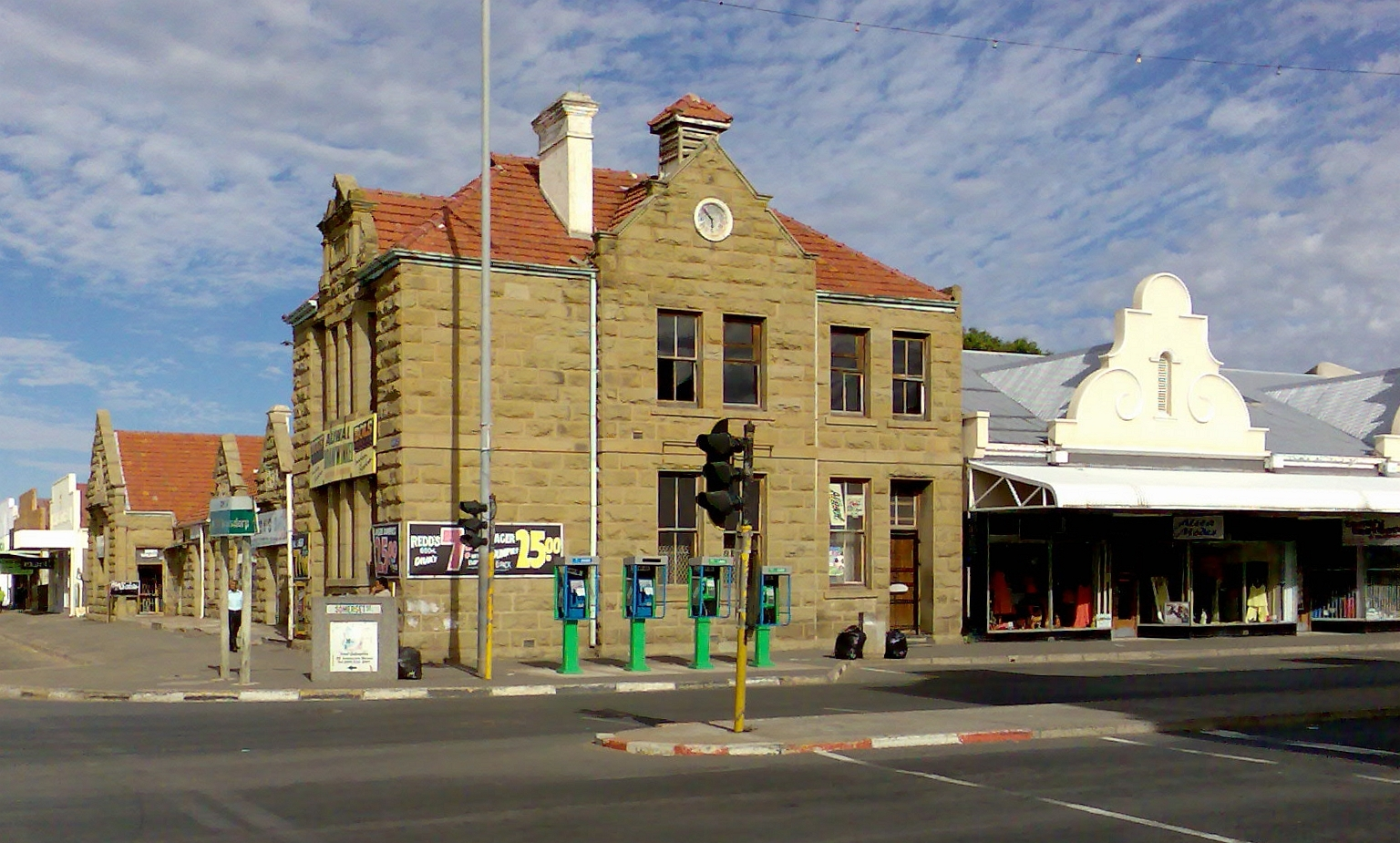
- The old Post Office building constructed from sandstone.

- Location within Eastern Cape Location within South Africa Location within Africa
- Coordinates: 30°42′S 26°42′E
- Country: South Africa
- Province: Eastern Cape
- District: Joe Gqabi
- Municipality: Walter Sisulu

Government
  - Type: Municipal Council
  - Mayor: (ANC)

Area
  - Total: 24.18 km^{2} (9.34 sq mi)
- Elevation: 1,325 m (4,347 ft)

Population (2011)
  - Total: 3,992
  - Density: 165.1/km^{2} (427.6/sq mi)

Racial makeup (2011)
  - Black African: 48.1%
  - White: 43.74%
  - Coloured: 5.66%
  - Indian/Asian: 0.95%
  - Other: 1.55%

First languages (2011)
  - Afrikaans: 40.31%
  - Xhosa: 29.63%
  - English: 7.16%
  - Sotho: 5.39%
  - Other: 17.51%
- Time zone: UTC+2 (SAST)
- Postal code (street): 9750
- PO box: 9750
- Area code: 051 (−633- / -634-)

Aliwal North, officially Maletswai, is a town in central South Africa on the banks of the Orange River, Eastern Cape Province. It is a medium-sized commercial centre in the northernmost part of the Eastern Cape. The Dutch Reformed Church was built in 1855.

== History ==
One of the first white settlers in the area, Pieter Jacobus de Wet, built a house at the nearby Buffelsvlei around 1828. Sir Harry Smith, Governor of the Cape Colony from 1847 to 1852, formally founded the small town of Aliwal North in the Cape Province of South Africa in 1850. He named the town "Aliwal North" in memory of his victory over the Sikhs at the Battle of Aliwal during the First Sikh War in India in 1846. The town was laid out in 1849 on ground acquired by the government. This was auctioned and 38 lots were sold for £972.

The park in the centre of Aliwal North, the Juana Square Gardens, was named after Smith's wife Juana María de los Dolores de León. Municipal status was attained in 1882.

The railway line from Molteno reached Aliwal North on 2 September 1885.

On 8 January 1901, following the evacuation of Smithfield during the Second Boer War, Major Kendal Pretyman Apthorp established the Aliwal North concentration camp, which at its height housed approximately 2,000 Boer refugees. The camp was closed by November 1902 after the inmates had been repatriated to their homes.

The Northern Post newspaper operated from Aliwal North from 1874 to 1902.

In 2024, the town of Aliwal North was renamed to Maletswai.

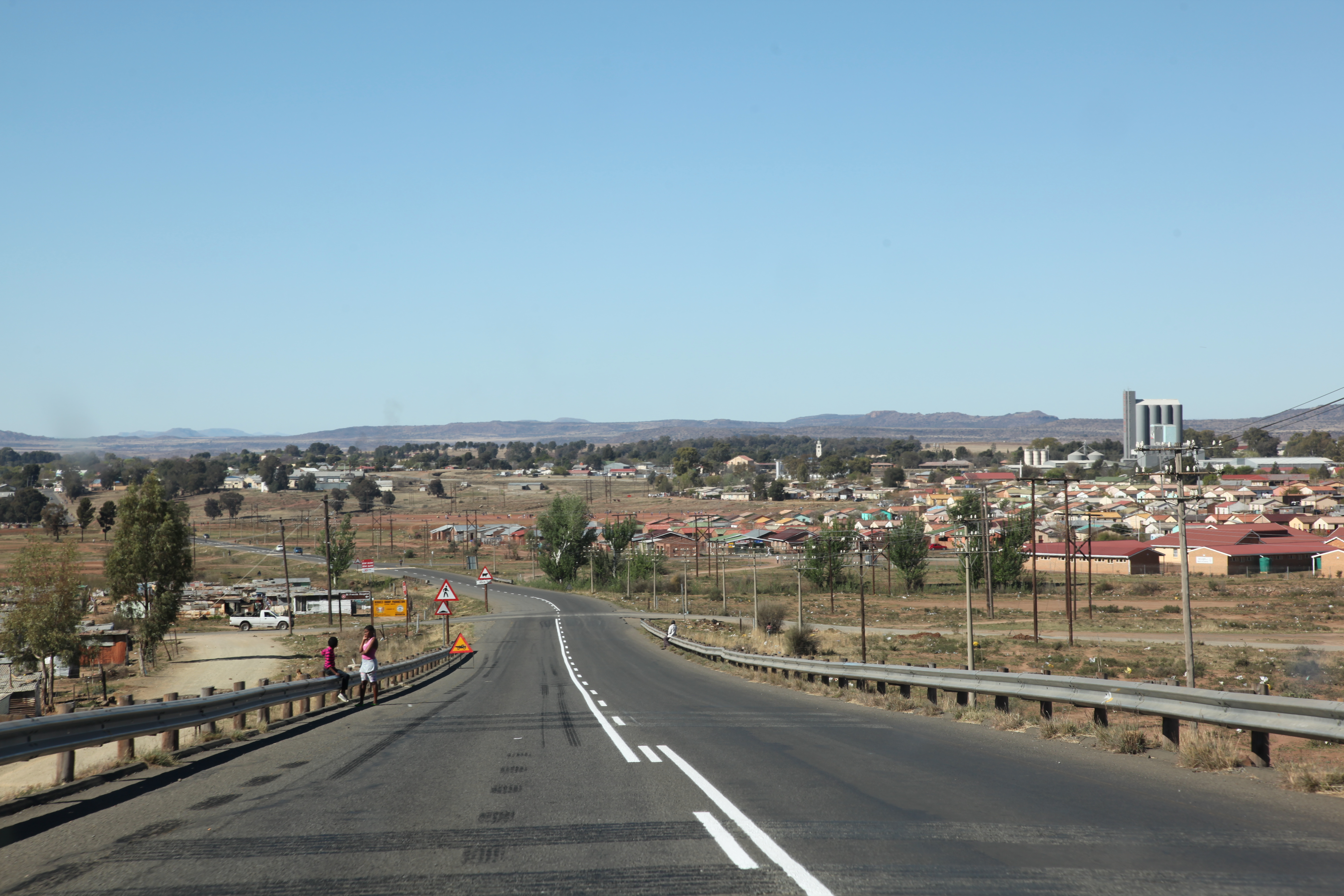
Entering Aliwal North from the west on the R58

== Geography ==
The settlement of the area and its development into a town probably is connected to the presence of good water, thermal springs and a good fording place ('drift') across the Orange River, just below its confluence with the Kraai River. The Frere Bridge was opened in 1880 and later replaced with the General Hertzog Bridge on the N6, leading to Bloemfontein, 206 km to the north. To the south-west of the town, the Kramberg rises to 2000 m above sea level.

Aliwal North has the following suburbs:

• Maletswai CBD

• Arbor View

• Buffelsbaden

• Bird's Eye View

• Dukathole

• Hilton

• Joe Gqabi

• Area13

== Layout ==
The central business district is surrounded by the following suburbs: Dukathole, Hilton, Joe Gqabi, the Springs (where the well-known Aliwal Spa is situated) and Arborsig. Many residents and staff of the Goedemoed Correctional Services facility (situated on the Free State side of the Orange River) use the town's many businesses, hospital, churches and schools.

The town is connected to neighbouring towns via a good roads system, and serve as a thoroughfare for tourists en route to resorts in the Eastern Cape Drakensberg. Unfortunately, the railway station had to close, due to lack of rail usage. The town also has a good airfield with three grass runways, safe for use during daylight.

== Notable people ==
- Joe Gqabi (1921–1981), African National Congress activist
- Thamsanqa Kambule, South African Mathematician and Educator
- Bongani Ndulula, South African footballer
- François Steyn, Springbok Rugby player
- Wandisile Letlabika, South African footballer

== Tourism ==
The principal attractions of Aliwal North are two hot mineral springs, both of which have extremely high concentrations of minerals and gases.

The thermal springs resort, named Aliwal Spa, is located within the municipal area. During 2010–2014 the resort underwent re-construction by Maletswai Local Municipality's contractors, and opened again for public use in 2015.

== Climate ==
Köppen climate classification: subtropical highland climate (Cwb).

Climate data for Aliwal North
Month	Jan	Feb	Mar	Apr	May	Jun	Jul	Aug	Sep	Oct	Nov	Dec	Year
Mean daily maximum °C (°F)	23 (73)	21 (70)	20 (68)	18 (64)	14 (57)	12 (54)	10 (50)	11 (52)	13 (55)	16 (61)	19 (66)	21 (70)	23 (73)
Daily mean °C (°F)	21 (70)	21 (70)	18 (64)	15 (59)	10 (50)	7 (45)	7 (45)	10 (50)	13 (55)	16 (61)	18 (64)	20 (68)	14 (57)
Mean daily minimum °C (°F)	11 (52)	10 (50)	7 (45)	4 (39)	2 (36)	−2 (28)	−3 (27)	0 (32)	1 (34)	4 (39)	6 (43)	10 (50)	12 (54)
Average precipitation mm (inches)	76 (3.0)	83 (3.3)	83 (3.3)	48 (1.9)	27 (1.1)	13 (0.5)	11 (0.4)	16 (0.6)	23 (0.9)	40 (1.6)	54 (2.1)	61 (2.4)	535 (21.1)
