= Ben Macdhui (Eastern Cape) =

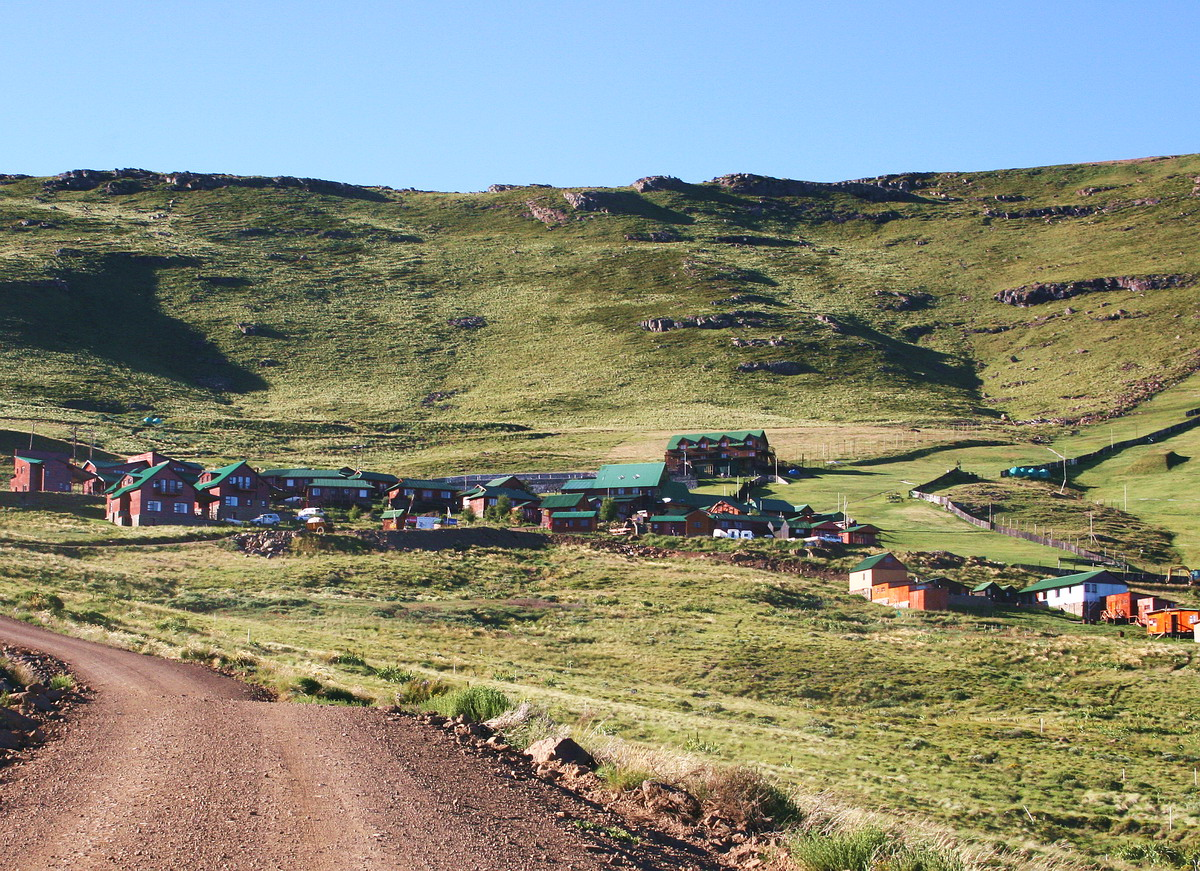
- Tiffindell Ski Resort on the south facing slope of Ben Macdhui

Highest point
- Elevation: 3,001 m (9,846 ft)
- Listing: List of mountains in South Africa
- Coordinates: 30°38′53.16″S 27°56′6.92″E

Geography
- Location within Eastern Cape
- Location: Eastern Cape, South Africa
- Parent range: Drakensberg

Ben Macdhui (also spelled Ben Macdui) is a 3,001-metre (9,846 ft) mountain in the Eastern Cape province of South Africa. It was named after Ben Macdui in Scotland. It is the highest peak in the Eastern Cape entirely within South Africa, the highest pass in South Africa, and the southernmost 3000-meter peak in Africa.
