= Eastern Cape =

Eastern Cape: Oos-Kaap (Afrikaans); eMpuma-Koloni (Xhosa); Aiǂoas!hub (Khoekhoe)
- Province
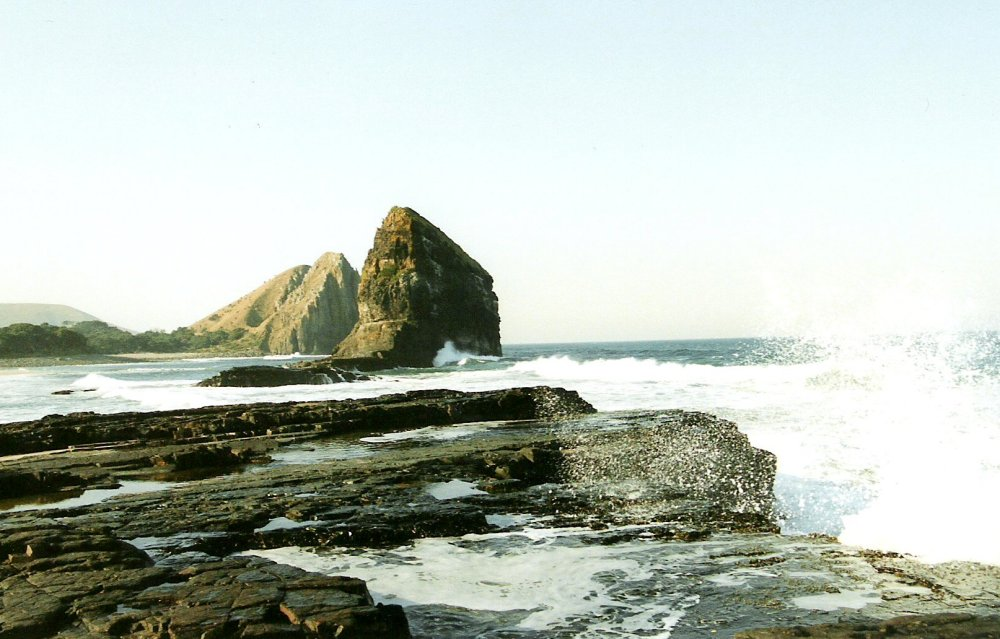
- The Wild Coast

- Coat of arms
- Motto: Development through Unity
- Location of the Eastern Cape in South Africa
- Coordinates: 32°S 27°E
- Country: South Africa
- Established: 27 April 1994
- Capital: Bhisho
- Largest city: Gqeberha (Port Elizabeth)
- Districts: List: Nelson Mandela Bay; Buffalo City; Sarah Baartman; Amathole; Chris Hani; Joe Gqabi; OR Tambo; Alfred Nzo

Government
  - Type: Parliamentary system
  - Premier: Oscar Mabuyane (ANC)
  - Legislature: Eastern Cape Provincial Legislature

Area
  - Total: 168,966 km^{2} (65,238 sq mi)
  - Rank: 2nd in South Africa
- Highest elevation: 3,019 m (9,905 ft)
- Lowest elevation: 0 m (0 ft)

Population (2022)
  - Total: 7,225,784
  - Rank: 4th in South Africa
  - Density: 42.7647/km^{2} (110.760/sq mi)
  - Rank: 6th in South Africa

Population groups (2022)
  - Black: 85.7%
  - Coloured: 7.6%
  - White: 5.6%
  - Indian or Asian: 0.5%
  - Other: 0.7%

Languages (2022)
  - Xhosa: 81.8%
  - Afrikaans: 9.6%
  - English: 4.8%
  - Sotho: 2.4%
- Time zone: UTC+2 (SAST)
- ISO 3166 code: ZA-EC
- HDI (2019): 0.671 medium · 9th of 9
- GDP: US$30.7 billion
- Website: www.ecprov.gov.za

Eastern Cape
- Zulu: iMpumalanga Kapa
- Xhosa: eMpuma-Koloni
- Afrikaans: Oos-Kaap
- Sepedi: Kapa Bohlabela
- Swazi: iMphumalanga eKapa
- Sesotho: Kapa Bochabela
- Setswana: Kapa Botlhaba
- Xitsonga: Nwalungu-Kapa
- Venda: Kapa Vhubvaḓuvha
- Southern Ndebele: ePumalanga Kapa
- Khoekhoe: Aiǂoas!hub

The Eastern Cape (Afrikaans: Oos-Kaap [ˈuəs.kɑːp]; Xhosa: eMpuma-Kapa; Khoekhoe: Aiǂoas!hub) is one of the nine provinces of South Africa. Its capital is Bhisho, and its largest city is Gqeberha (formerly Port Elizabeth). Due to its temperate climate and Victorian towns, it is a common location for tourists. It is also known for having been home to many anti-apartheid activists, including Nelson Mandela, Govan Mbeki, Walter Sisulu, Oliver Tambo, Raymond Mhlaba, Steve Biko, Robert Sobukwe and Chris Hani.

The second largest province in the country (at 168,966 km^{2}) after the Northern Cape, it was formed in 1994 out of the Xhosa homelands or bantustans of Transkei and Ciskei, together with the eastern portion of the Cape Province. The central and eastern part of the province is the traditional home of the indigenous Xhosa people. In 1820 this area, which was known as the Xhosa Kingdom, began to be settled by Europeans who originally came from Great Britain and Ireland. Eastern Cape is the only province in South Africa where the number of Black Africans declined from 86.6% to 85.7% since Apartheid ended in 1994.

== History ==
The Eastern Cape province was formed in 1994, incorporating areas from the former Xhosa homelands of the Transkei and Ciskei, together with what was previously part of the Cape Province. This resulted in several anomalies, including the fact that the Province has four supreme courts (Makhanda (formerly named Grahamstown), Gqeberha (formerly named Port Elizabeth), Bhisho and Mthatha, and had enclaves of KwaZulu-Natal in the province. The latter anomaly has fallen away with amendments to municipal and provincial boundaries.

The Xhosa Kingdom was one of the most powerful kingdoms in Africa, and had all states in the Eastern Cape as tributaries. Any group, people, or tribe that recognised the Xhosa Kingdom as Paramouncy became Xhosa, practiced Xhosa culture and used isiXhosa as their main language. Some of the tribes that fall under the category of Xhosa people include: AmaMpondo, AbaThembu, AmaMpondomise, AmaHlubi, AmaBhaca, AmaXesibe, AmaBomvana and more.

=== European settlers ===
In the late 18th century the Dutch Cape Colony slowly expanded eastwards from its original centre around Cape Town. This led to the establishment in 1786 of the Dutch settlement of Graaff-Reinet – named for the Governor of the Cape Colony Cornelius Jacob van de Graaff (in office: 1785–1791) and for his wife Hester Cornelia van de Graaff (née Reynet). Later, during the Napoleonic Wars of 1803–1815, Britain took control of the Cape Colony (1806) and encouraged British citizens to migrate there as a means to boost the British population in the area.

From the early 1800s until the formation of the Union of South Africa in 1910, the Eastern Cape saw colonisation by British migrants. They established most of the towns, naming them either after places in the United Kingdom, members of the British royal family, or after the original founders and their families. British colonization saw schools, churches, hospitals, town centres and government buildings built to speed up development. Some of the older European settlements include Fort Beaufort (1814), Grahamstown (1812), Port Elizabeth (1820), Salem (1820), Bathurst (1820), East London (1836), Paterson (1879), Cradock (1814), Fort Beaufort (1816) and King William's Town (1836).

== Geography ==
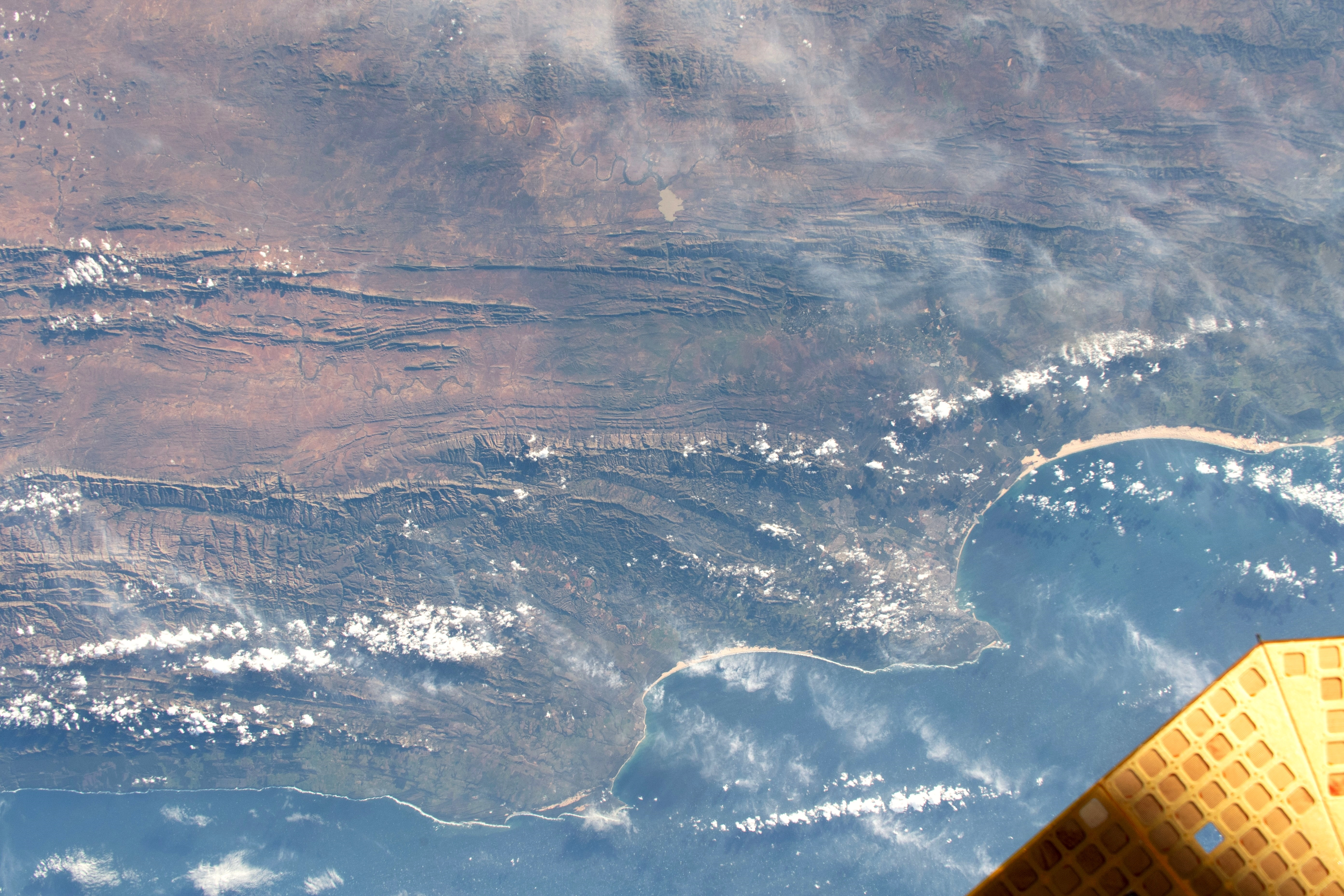
The southern part of the province seen from space. Various mountain ranges in the Cape Fold Belt are visible, besides Cape Recife and Cape St. Francis.

The Eastern Cape gets progressively wetter from west to east. The west is mostly semiarid Karoo, except in the far south, which is temperate rainforest in the Tsitsikamma region. The coast is generally rugged with interspersed beaches. Most of the province is hilly to very mountainous between Graaff-Reinet and Rhodes including the Sneeuberge (English: Snow Mountains), Stormberge, Winterberge and Drakensberg (English: Dragon Mountains). The highest point in the province is Ben Macdhui at 3001 m. The east from East London and Queenstown towards the KwaZulu-Natal border – a region known previously as Transkei – is lush grassland on rolling hills, punctuated by deep gorges with intermittent forest.

Eastern Cape has a coast on its east which lines southward, creating shores leading to the south Indian Ocean. In the northeast, it borders the following districts of Lesotho:

- Mohale's Hoek District – west of Quthing
- Quthing District – between Mohale and Qacha's Nek
- Qacha's Nek District – east of Quthing

Domestically, it borders the following provinces:

- Western Cape – west
- Northern Cape – northwest
- Free State – north
- KwaZulu-Natal – far northeast

=== Cities and towns ===
- Gqeberha (Port Elizabeth)
- East London (KuGompo City)
- Makhanda (Grahamstown)
- Graaff-Reinet (Robert Sobukwe Town)
- Grahamstown (Makhanda)
- Maletswai (Aliwal North)
- Port Alfred
- Queenstown (Komani)
- Jeffreys Bay
- Somerset East (KwaNojoli)
- Alice (Dikeni)
- Qonce (King William's Town)
- Mthatha
- Bhisho
- Uitenhage (Kariega)
- Mdantsane
- Butterworth (Gcuwa)
- Port St. Johns
- Mbizana
- Flagstaff
- Libode
- Cofimvaba
- Dutywa
- Fort Beaufort (KwaMaqoma)
- Komga
- Peddie (Ngqushwa)
- Stutterheim
- Qumbu
- Mount Frere (KwaBhaca)
- Ntabankulu
- Matatiele
- Burgersdorp
- Lady Grey
- Maclear (Nqanqarhu)
- Nxuba (Cradock)
- Cacadu
- Ngcobo
- Cala
- Kareedouw
- Kirkwood (Nqweba)
- Mount Fletcher (Tlokoeng)
- Sterkspruit
- Engcobo (Ngcobo)
- Alexandria (Mnyameni)
- Willowvale (Gatyana)
- Elliotdale (Xhorha)
- Kentane (Centane)
- Tsomo
- Tsolo
- Nqamakwe

=== Climate ===
Climate is highly varied. The west is dry with sparse rain during winter or summer, with frosty winters and hot summers. The area Tsitsikamma to Grahamstown receives more precipitation, which is also relatively evenly distributed and temperatures are mild. Further east, rainfall becomes more plentiful and humidity increases, becoming more subtropical along the coast with summer rainfall. The interior can become very cold in winter, with heavy snowfalls occasionally occurring in the mountainous regions between Molteno and Rhodes.

- Gqeberha: Jan Max: 25 °C, Min: 18 °C; Jul Max: 20 °C, Min: 9 °C
- Molteno & Barkly East: Jan Max 28 °C, Min 11 °C; Jul Max: 14 °C, Min: -7 °C

=== Municipalities ===
Eastern Cape Population Density (2011)

Map of Eastern Cape showing municipalities and districts

The Eastern Cape Province is divided into two metropolitan municipalities and six district municipalities. The district municipalities are in turn divided into 31 local municipalities.

== Demographics ==
As of the 2022 census, the Eastern Cape had a population of 7,230,204, an increase of 10.2% from the prior census in 2011. It is the fourth-most populous of South Africa's nine provinces. The median age is 27, an increase of 5 years from 2011.

=== Race/Ethnicity ===
In the 2022 census, 85.7% of the population described themselves as Black African, 7.6% as Coloured, 5.6% as White and 0.5% as Indian/Asian. A large majority of Black African people in the province are Xhosa, with 78.8% of residents in Eastern Cape identifying as Xhosa as of 2011. Unlike most of South Africa, a substantial proportion of the White population is of British descent. Roughly half of White South Africans in Eastern Cape are English-speakers of British and Irish descent while the other half are of Boer/Afrikaner ancestry. Eastern Cape is one of only two provinces in South Africa where Whites of British descent outnumber Boers/Afrikaners, the other being KwaZulu-Natal.

Historic Breakdown of Population by Group
Population Group	1996	2001	2011	2022
Black African	86.6%	87.2%	86.3%	85.7%
Coloured	7.7%	7.7%	8.3%	7.6%
White	5.4%	4.9%	4.7%	5.6%
Indian/Asian	0.3%	0.3%	0.4%	0.5%
Other	n/a	n/a	0.3%	0.7%

=== Languages ===
Dominant home languages in the Eastern Cape: Afrikaans; English; Xhosa; Zulu; Sotho; No language dominant

In the 2022 census, 81.8% of the population reported their first language as Xhosa, 9.6% as Afrikaans, 4.8% as English, and 2.4% as Sotho. The Eastern Cape is the only province in which native Xhosa-speakers form a majority of the population.

=== Religion ===
As of the 2022 census, 86.1% of the population described themselves as Christians, 11.0% stated that they practiced Traditional African religions, and 0.6% described themselves as Muslim. 1.5% of the population described themselves as being atheist, agnostic, or having no religious affiliation.

== Economy ==
The Eastern Cape is the poorest province in South Africa and has the highest expanded and official unemployment rate in the country. Subsistence agriculture predominates in the former homelands, resulting in widespread poverty. A multi billion Rand industrial development zone and deep water port are being developed in Coega to boost investment in export-oriented industries. Overall the province only contributes 8% to the national GDP despite making 13.5% of the population. The real GDP of Eastern Cape stands at an estimated R230.3billion in 2017, making the province the fourth largest regional economy in SA ahead of Limpopo and Mpumalanga.

=== Agriculture ===
There is much fertile land in the Eastern Cape, and agriculture remains important. The fertile Langkloof Valley in the southwest has large deciduous fruit orchards. In the Karoo there is widespread sheep farming.

The Alexandria-Makhanda area produces pineapples, chicory and dairy products, while coffee and tea are cultivated at Magwa. People in the former Transkei region are dependent on cattle, maize and sorghum-farming. An olive nursery has been developed in collaboration with the University of Fort Hare to form a nucleus of olive production in the Eastern Cape.

Domestic stock farming is slowly giving way to game farming on large scale. Eco-tourism is resulting in economic benefits, and there is lower risk needed to protect wild, native game against drought, and the natural elements. Habitat loss and poaching pose the greatest problems.

The area around Stutterheim is being cultivated extensively with timber plantations.

The basis of the province's fishing industry is squid, some recreational and commercial fishing for line fish, the collection of marine resources, and access to line-catches of hake.

In the Eastern Grasslands landscape centred on Rhodes and Maclear, Conservation South Africa has been involved in initiatives on sustainable grazing and strengthening wool value chains.

=== Industry ===
With three harbours and three airports offering direct flights to the main centres, and a developed road and rail infrastructure, the province has been earmarked as a key area for growth and economic development in modern South Africa.

The two major industrial centres, Port Elizabeth and East London have well-developed economies based on the automotive industry. General Motors and Volkswagen both have major assembly lines in the Port Elizabeth area, while East London is dominated by the large DaimlerChrysler plant, now known as Mercedes-Benz South Africa.

Environmental-friendly projects include the Fish River Spatial Development Initiative, the Wild Coast SDI, and two industrial development zones, the East London Industrial Development Zone and the Coega IDZ near Port Elizabeth. Coega is the largest infrastructure development in post-apartheid South Africa. The construction of the deepwater Port of Ngqura was completed and the first commercial ship anchored in October 2009.

Other sectors include finance, real estate, business services, wholesale and retail trade, eco-tourism (nature reserves and game ranches) and hotels and restaurants.

== Law and government ==
The Eastern Cape provincial government is based in Bhisho, the provincial capital. The Eastern Cape Division of the High Court of South Africa is situated in Makhanda (Grahamstown), with local seats in Gqeberha (Port Elizabeth), East London, and Bhisho.

Like South Africa's other provinces, the Eastern Cape has a parliamentary system of government, with the premier of the province elected by the Eastern Cape Provincial Legislature. The premier then selects the members of the Executive Council (cabinet). The current premier is Oscar Mabuyane of the African National Congress (ANC).

The provincial legislature is elected every five years by a system of party-list proportional representation. The most recent provincial election was held in 2024, which was won by the ANC, which has governed the province continuously since the end of Apartheid in 1994. The Democratic Alliance (DA) is the second largest party and forms the official opposition. The results of the most recent provincial election in 2024 are as follows:

Party	Votes	%	+/–	Seats	+/–
African National Congress	1,114,294	62.16	▼6.58	45	▲1
Democratic Alliance	267,007	14.89	▼0.84	11	▲1
Economic Freedom Fighters	181,855	10.14	▲2.30	8	▲3
United Democratic Movement	66,572	3.71	▲1.11	3	▲1
Patriotic Alliance	41,355	2.31	New	2	▲2
African Transformation Movement	27,761	1.55	▲0.03	1	0
uMkhonto we Sizwe	25,904	1.44	New	1	New
Freedom Front Plus	9,321	0.52	▼0.06	1	0
Pan Africanist Congress of Azania	9,168	0.51	▲0.10	0	0
African Christian Democratic Party	8,642	0.48	▲0.01	0	0
ActionSA	8,315	0.46	New	0	New
Rise Mzansi	5,167	0.29	New	0	New
African Independent Congress	3,935	0.22	▼0.20	0	0
Azanian People's Organisation	3,884	0.22	▲0.14	0	0
Build One South Africa	3,138	0.18	New	0	New
Congress of the People	2,178	0.12	▼0.13	0	0
Batho Pele Movement	2,078	0.12	New	0	New
African People's Convention	1,770	0.10	▼0.03	0	–
Good	1,683	0.09	▼0.15	0	0
Al Jama-ah	1,543	0.09	▼0.06	0	0
Alliance of Citizens for Change	1,511	0.08	New	0	0
Inkatha Freedom Party	1,343	0.07	▲0.02	0	0
Arise South Africa	1,128	0.06	New	0	0
African Congress for Transformation	1,047	0.06	New	0	0
Komani Progress Action	976	0.05	New	0	0
Independent South African National Civic Organisation	877	0.05	New	0	0
African Movement Congress	269	0.02	New	0	0
Total	1,792,721	100.00	–	72	–

== Education ==
The Eastern Cape Department of Education has been criticised for poor primary and secondary education resulting from dysfunction, special interests, and issues with the South Africa teachers union, SADTU. The province struggles with a lack of schools; a lack of teachers leading to overcrowding; a lack of textbooks; a lack of basic facilities like toilets, electricity or water; and poor transport infrastructure which regularly absents and endangers learners. The problem is particularly acute in the former Transkei.

By 2011, basic education had so deteriorated that the national Department of Basic Education intervened under section 100(1)(b) of the Constitution of South Africa, taking control of the province's educational administration. The Eastern Cape has since been the worst-performing province educationally and especially in terms of matriculation; matriculants' results averaged 51% in 2009, 58.3% in 2011, 64.9% in 2013, 65.4% in 2014, and 56.8% in 2015.

In the 2015/2016 financial year, the province failed to spend R 530 million of its allocated R 1.5 billion budget for education, most of it intended for infrastructure development.

Equal Education's 2017 report, Planning to Fail, found a "systemic failure in Eastern Cape education".

=== Universities ===
- Rhodes University (Makhanda)
- Nelson Mandela University (Gqeberha)
- University of Fort Hare (main campus in Alice, satellite campuses in Bhisho and East London)
- Walter Sisulu University (campuses in Buffalo City, Butterworth, Mthatha and Komani)

=== Other educational institutions ===
- College of the Transfiguration, Makhanda

== Health ==
The province is served by big medical centres such as Cecilia Makiwane Hospital which is a large, government-funded hospital near the city of East London that also serves as a tertiary teaching hospital. Frere Hospital is another large, provincial government-funded hospital near East London which also serves as a tertiary teaching hospital. These hospitals offer many specialty departments such as an ARV clinic for HIV/AIDS in adults and children. Both hospitals are affiliated with Lilitha Nursing College and Walter Sisulu University.

While the Eastern Cape has many hospitals and private clinics, the province has some of the worst health outcomes and service indicators in South Africa. Some of this can be attributed to staff shortages, with a report indicating that 67% of the 27 monitored facilities have insufficient staff.

Rural residents in the Eastern Cape face worse health outcomes than those who reside in the larger towns or cities. This is due to a number of conditions such as lack of healthcare resources, lack of means to access healthcare resources, high unemployment, and poverty. Illiteracy is also a problem in rural communities, which further limits positive health outcomes.

HIV/AIDS and Tuberculosis are also ongoing issues in the region. In 2017, the Eastern Cape had a TB incidence of 839/100,000 people, which was higher than South Africa's estimated prevalence of 737/100,000. Additionally, the Eastern Cape has a high overall HIV prevalence rate (25.2%) as of 2017. In 2018, HIV/AIDS was the second leading underlying natural cause of death in the Eastern Cape with a 5.9% prevalence rate. Since 2017, there has been an increase in the level of noncommunicable diseases (NCDs), which disproportionately affects poorer communities. Furthermore, obesity and undiagnosed hypertension are major concerns in rural areas.

The Eastern Cape is also known for its traditional Xhosa initiation schools, which perform coming-of-age ceremonies known as ulwaluko which involve circumcision. These ceremonies have been linked to numerous complications such as coma, illness and death.

There have been numerous reports in South African newspapers investigating the poor practices which lead to the death of young men and boys during initiation rituals. In one case, an 18-year-old teenager named Yongama Boya was sent to the hospital to be circumcised, as his parents believed this would be the safer option. Then, he was sent to complete the rest of his initiation ritual in a traditional initiation school in the Qumbu area of the Transkei. There, the nurse refused to accept the validity of his prior circumcision at the hospital, and she circumcised him again, resulting in his death.

== Tourism ==
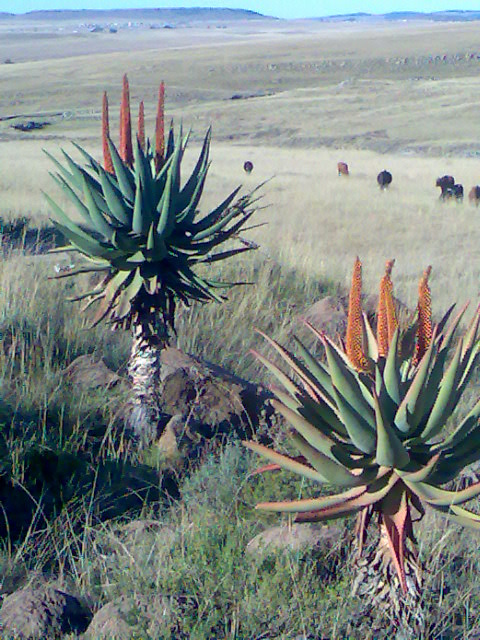
Aloe ferox on the R61 route between Cofimvaba and Ngcobo.

The landscape is extremely diverse. The western interior is largely arid Karoo, while the east is well-watered and green. The Eastern Cape offers a wide array of attractions, including 800 kilometres (500 mi) of untouched and pristine coastline along with beaches, and big-five game viewing in a malaria-free environment.

The Addo Elephant National Park, situated 73 kilometres (45 mi) from Port Elizabeth, was created in 1931. Its 743 square kilometres (287 sq mi) offers sanctuary to 170 elephants, 400 Cape buffalo and 21 black rhino of the endangered Kenyan sub-species.

The province is the location of Tiffindell, South Africa's only snow skiing resort, which is situated near the hamlet of Rhodes in the Southern Drakensberg. It is on the slopes of Ben Macdhui, the highest mountain peak in the Eastern Cape 3,001 metres (9,846 ft).

The National Arts Festival, held annually in Grahamstown, is Africa's largest cultural event, offering a choice of both indigenous and imported talent. Every year for eleven days the town's population almost doubles, as over 50,000 people flock to the region for a feast of arts, crafts, music and entertainment.

Jeffreys Bay is an area with wild coastline, which is backed by sub-tropical rainforest. The waters here are noted for having good waves for surfing.

Aliwal North, lying on an agricultural plateau on the southern bank of the Orange River, is an inland resort known for its hot springs.

The rugged and unspoiled Wild Coast is a place known for its scenery. The coastal areas have been a graveyard for many vessels.

Whittlesea, Eastern Cape, situated in the Amatola Mountains, is known for the first wine estate in the province.

King William's Town, Alice, Queenstown, Grahamstown, Cradock and Fort Beaufort offer some of the best colonial architecture of the 19th century in the province. The two major cities lining the coast are East London and Port Elizabeth.

== Sports ==
- Checkers/Draughts
  - Mind Sports South Africa
- eSports
  - Mind Sports South Africa
- Football
  - Blackburn Rovers (KuGompo City) (dissolved)
  - Chippa United F.C. (Gqeberha)
- Cricket
  - Sunrisers Eastern Cape (Gqeberha)
  - Warriors (Gqeberha)
- Rugby
  - Eastern Province Elephants (Gqeberha)
  - Border Bulldogs (KuGompo City)

== Notable people ==
The Eastern Cape has been home to many major anti-apartheid leaders such as Robert Sobukwe, Oliver Tambo, Nelson Mandela, Walter Sisulu, Winnie Mandela, Govan Mbeki, Alfred Xuma, Donald Woods, Cecilia Makiwane, Noni Jabavu, Thabo Mbeki, Chris Hani, Bantu Holomisa, Steve Biko, Albertina Nontsikelelo Sisulu, Makhenkesi Arnold Stofile, Raymond Mhlaba and Max Vuyisile Sisulu. Musicians include Miriam Makeba, Madosini, Nathi, Vusi Nova, and Zahara. Lawyers, Dali Mpofu and Tembeka Ngcukaitobi. Author Zakes Mda, sportsmen such as Mark Boucher, Siya Kolisi, Makhaya Ntini, Temba Bavuma, Jody Scheckter, Wendy Botha, as well as historical figures such as Charles Coghlan, Rev. Tiyo Soga, Samuel Mqhayi, Enoch Sontonga, King Sandile, King Hintsa, King Sabata Dalidyebo, Chief Maqoma, Chief Ndlambe, Chief Kaiser Matanzima, Chief Lennox Sebe and Jotello Festiri Soga are also from the province.
