= Qumbu =

- Location within Eastern Cape Location within South Africa Location within Africa
- Coordinates: 31.161667°S 28.868056°E
- Country: South Africa
- Province: Eastern Cape
- District: O.R. Tambo
- Municipality: Mhlontlo

Area
  - Total: 42.31 km^{2} (16.34 sq mi)

Population (2011)
  - Total: 4,928
  - Density: 116.5/km^{2} (301.7/sq mi)

Racial makeup (2011)
  - Black African: 98.8%
  - Coloured: 0.5%
  - White: 0.1%
  - Other: 0.6%

First languages (2011)
  - Xhosa: 90.0%
  - English: 3.3%
  - Sign language: 1.9%
  - Hlubi: 1.1%
  - Other: 3.7%
- Time zone: UTC+2 (SAST)
- Postal code (street): 5180
- PO box: 5180
- Area code: 047

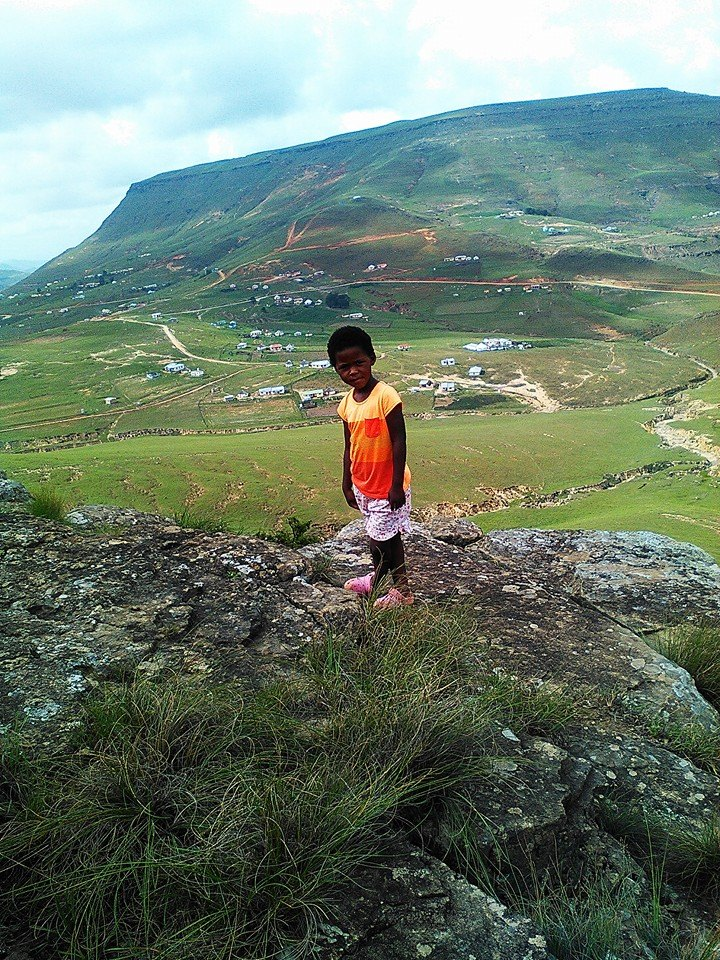
Photograph of the town of Qumbu in the background, with a local child in the foreground.

Qumbu is a town in OR Tambo District Municipality in the Eastern Cape province of South Africa.

The town is 61 km north of Mthatha and was founded in 1876. Lower Kroza & Mvumelwana are the biggest rural areas in Qumbu 5180. The name is of isiXhosa origin, derived from amazimba aqumbu, ‘the corn has budded’, or ‘the corn is swollen’, referring to a tribal war which occurred at that time of the year. It is also known by its tribal fights during the 19th century, where King Mhlontlo of the AmaMpondomise was accused of killing the then Missioner Mr Hamilton Hope who helps in the foundation of the town Magistrate court. Mhlontlo was later arrested in King Williams Town.

Qumbu was the first place in the Eastern Transkei homeland to have a hospital named Nessie Knight in the nearby rural area of Sulenkama, founded by the Missioner Mr Peterson. It lies on the north-east side of the Eastern Cape provincial border alongside the N2 route between Mthatha and Mt Frere, and the R396 between Tsolo and Maclear. It is bordered by King Sabata Dalindyebo Local Municipality to the south, Nyandeni Local Municipality to the east, Umzimvubu Local Municipality to the north

The nearest hospital is Nessie Knight Hospital.

In the 1990s and early 2000s high level of stock theft in the area resulted in a low-level civil war that engulfed Qumbu and the nearby settlement of Tsolo. This conflict left an estimated 400 people dead. In 2007 the area was still ranked as having one of the highest rates of stock theft in South Africa.

== Notable people ==
- King Luzuko Matiwane, Bayethe! Zwelozuko! - King of the AmaMpondomise
