= Canzibe =

- Location within Eastern Cape Location within South Africa
- Coordinates: 31°48′30″S 29°04′00″E
- Country: South Africa
- Province: Eastern Cape
- District: O.R. Tambo
- Municipality: Nyandeni

Area
  - Total: 1.29 km^{2} (0.50 sq mi)

Population (2011)
  - Total: 1,005
  - Density: 779/km^{2} (2,020/sq mi)

Racial makeup (2011)
  - Black African: 99.0%
  - Coloured: 0.2%
  - Indian/Asian: 0.1%
  - White: 0.5%
  - Other: 0.2%

First languages (2011)
  - Xhosa: 93.5%
  - English: 1.9%
  - Zulu: 1.7%
  - Other: 2.9%
- Time zone: UTC+2 (SAST)
- Postal code (street): 5144
- PO box: 5144
- Area code: 047

Canzibe is a village of 1,000 inhabitants in the Eastern Cape province of South Africa. It is situated near the R61 road (future N2 Wild Coast Toll Route) from Port St. Johns to Mthatha in the Nyandeni Local Municipality, which is part of the OR Tambo District Municipality. As a small village it features some primary schools and a hospital, the Canzibe Hospital.

== Economy ==
Canzibe is part of one of the poorest areas of South Africa. Unemployment in 2008 was at 92%.

== Tourism ==
Near Canzibe is the Hluleka Nature Reserve and Hluleka Beach (24 km away), as well as Presely Bay (18 km).
