= Tsolo =

- Location within Eastern Cape Location within South Africa
- Coordinates: 31.316667°S 28.75°E
- Country: South Africa
- Province: Eastern Cape
- District: O.R. Tambo
- Municipality: Mhlontlo

Area
  - Total: 46.74 km^{2} (18.05 sq mi)

Population (2011)
  - Total: 7,794
  - Density: 166.8/km^{2} (431.9/sq mi)

Racial makeup (2011)
  - Black African: 96.3%
  - Coloured: 1.5%
  - Indian/Asian: 1.4%
  - White: 0.4%
  - Other: 0.4%

First languages (2011)
  - Xhosa: 91.7%
  - English: 2.5%
  - Afrikaans: 1.8%
  - Other: 4.1%
- Time zone: UTC+2 (SAST)
- Postal code (street): 5170
- PO box: 5170
- Area code: 047

Tsolo is a town in Mhlontlo Local Municipality in OR Tambo District of the Eastern Cape province of South Africa.

The town is some 42 km north-west of Mthatha and 22 km south-west of Qumbu. The name, derived from Xhosa, is said to mean ‘pointed’, referring to the shape of hills there.

Tsolo has two government hospitals, St Lucy's Hospital and Dr. Malizo Mpehle Memorial Hospital.

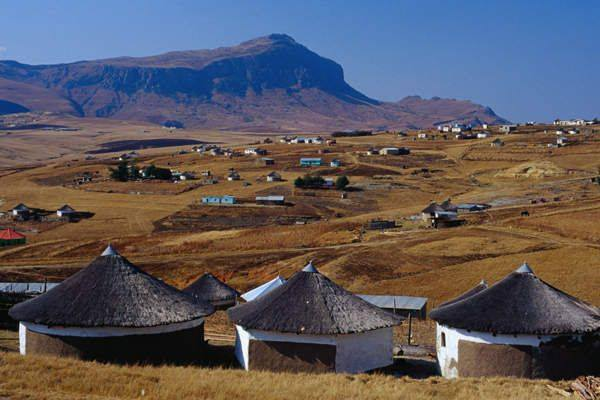
Image of Tsolo, Eastern Cape

It is a home to many villages such as Hlangani, Goqwana, Tiki-tiki, etc.With many rivers mostly from uGriniga Dam, which is a source of water for many villages including Hlangani and Goqwana

== Notable people ==
- Kedibone Letlaka-Rennert – Miss Transkei 1981 and Diversity Advisor at the International Monetary Fund
- Masizole Mnqasela – Western Cape Provincial Parliament
- Zozibini Tunzi – Miss Universe 2019
- Mandisa Maya - Female jurist
- Ayanda Daweti - Actor
