= Ngwegweni =

- Location within Eastern Cape Location within South Africa
- Coordinates: 30.734°S 29.357°E
- Country: South Africa
- Province: Eastern Cape
- District: Alfred Nzo
- Municipality: Umzimvubu

Area
  - Total: 3.84 km^{2} (1.48 sq mi)

Population (2011)
  - Total: 1,796
  - Density: 468/km^{2} (1,210/sq mi)

Racial makeup (2011)
  - Black African: 99.9%
  - Indian/Asian: 0.1%
  - White: 0.1%

First languages (2011)
  - Xhosa: 98.9%
  - Other: 1.1%
- Time zone: UTC+2 (SAST)

Ngwegweni is a village in Umzimvubu Local Municipality in the Eastern Cape province of South Africa, not far from Mount Ayliff.
