= Buntingville, South Africa =

Buntingville
- Location within Eastern Cape Location within South Africa
- Coordinates: 31.639°S 28.869°E
- Country: South Africa
- Province: Eastern Cape
- District: OR Tambo
- Municipality: Nyandeni

Government
  - Councillor: Mbumbulwana

Area
  - Total: 3.44 km^{2} (1.33 sq mi)

Population (2011)
  - Total: 1,090
  - Density: 317/km^{2} (821/sq mi)

Racial makeup (2011)
  - Black African: 99.8%
  - Coloured: 0.1%
  - Other: 0.1%

First languages (2011)
  - Xhosa: 98.3%
  - Other: 1.7%
- Time zone: UTC+2 (SAST)
- PO box: 5115

Buntingville is a Methodist mission station 15 km south-east of Mthatha. Originally established by the Reverend W B Boyce in 1830 as Old Bunting near the village of the Pondo chief Faku at the headwaters of the Umngazana River, it was transferred about 1865. It was named after Jabez Bunting (1779–1858), the English Wesleyan church leader.
