= Lizo Gqoboka =

South African rugby union player (born 1990)

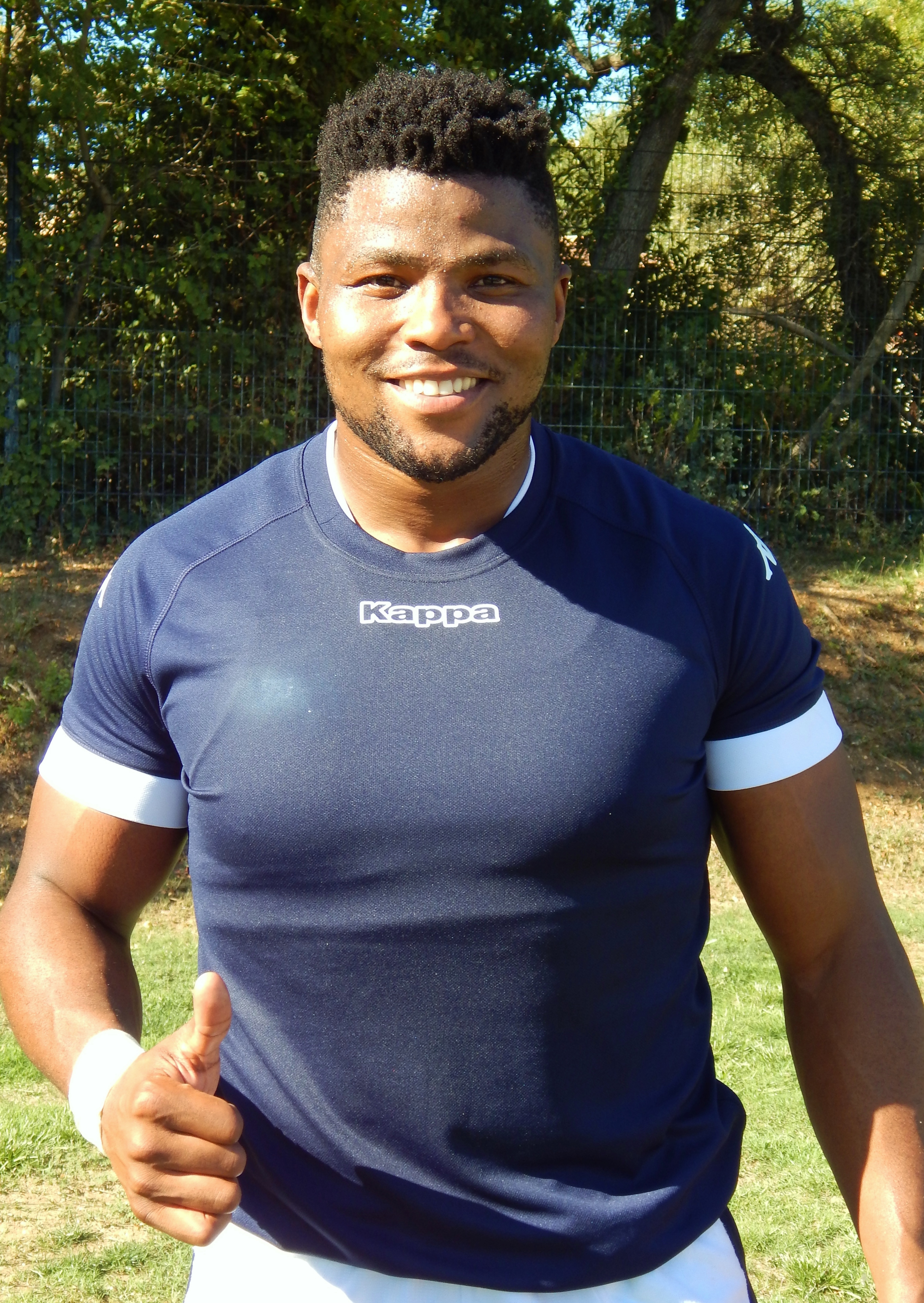
- Full name: Lizo Pumzile Gqoboka
- Born: 24 March 1990 (age 36) Tabankulu, South Africa
- Height: 1.83 m (6 ft 0 in)
- Weight: 115 kg (254 lb; 18 st 2 lb)
- School: Ntabankulu High School, Mount Frere

Rugby union career
- Position: Prop
- Current team: Bulls / Blue Bulls
Youth career
- 2011: Eastern Province Kings
Amateur team(s)
Years	Team	Apps	(Points)
2013	NMMU Madibaz	3	(0)
Senior career
Years	Team	Apps	(Points)
2012–2015	Eastern Province Kings	58	(20)
2016–2023	Bulls	72	(30)
2016–2023	Blue Bulls	26	(30)
2023-	Stormers	0	(0)
- Correct as of 23 July 2022
International career
Years	Team	Apps	(Points)
2016	South Africa 'A'	2	(0)
2016	Springbok XV	1	(0)
2019–present	South Africa	2	(0)
- Correct as of 21 August 2019

Lizo Pumzile Gqoboka (born 24 March 1990) is a South African retired professional rugby union player. His regular position was prop.

== Career ==
=== Youth ===
Gqoboka's high school in Tabankulu (a village near Mount Frere in the Eastern Cape) did not play rugby and he concentrated on athletics (running 100m in 11.6 seconds) and soccer.

Gqoboka only started playing the sport aged 19 when he moved to Durban to study human resource management and there joined Durban Collegians Sports Club. He started off playing as a Number Eight and a Lock, but eventually moved to prop. A player for the Eastern Province Kings at that time, Milo Nqoro, helped Gqoboka secure a trial at the Port Elizabeth-based side in 2011 and impressed sufficiently to make three appearances for the Eastern Province U21 side during the 2011 Under-21 Provincial Championship.

=== Eastern Province Kings ===
In 2012, Gqoboka earned a senior contract with the Eastern Province Kings and was included in their 2012 Vodacom Cup squad. He made his first team debut against Border Bulldogs on 16 March 2012, coming on as a late substitute. He started his first senior match against Free State Cheetahs a fortnight later.

In the second half of the season, Gqoboka made his Currie Cup debut against the Falcons in Kempton Park, scoring a try on debut as the Kings ran out 37–20 winners, and made his first start the next week against the Border Bulldogs. He made a total of four appearances during the round-robin stages of the 2012 Currie Cup First Division to help the Eastern Province Kings finish top of the log. He also appeared in the semi-final of the competition, where his side won 50–27 against the Leopards, but wasn't involved in the final as the Kings won the trophy by beating the Pumas 26–25. He also played in the second leg of the promotion/relegation matches against the Free State Cheetahs, but could not help his side win promotion to the Premier Division, losing 69–20 on aggregate.

Gqoboka was initially named in the Southern Kings Super Rugby training squad for the 2013 Super Rugby season, but was later released. Instead, he played some Varsity Cup rugby with the NMMU Madibaz where he made three appearances to help the university side reached the semi-finals of the competition for the first time ever. Gqoboka then played a further six times in the 2013 Vodacom Cup and helped them qualify to the quarter-finals of the competition. Against the Blue Bulls in the quarter-finals, the Kings were 31–13 down with less than ten minutes to go, before three late tries – including a dramatic injury time try from Gqoboka – help them win the match 34–31 to reach the semi-finals of that competition for the first time ever, but they lost that match 39–13 to the Pumas.

Gqoboka played in 15 of their 16 matches during the 2013 Currie Cup First Division season, as they reached the final of this competition for the fourth consecutive season. He started their final against the Pumas in Nelspruit, but the Kings lost the match 53–30.

With the Kings not playing Super Rugby in 2014, Gqoboka – along with fly-half George Whitehead – joined the Sharks for pre-season training prior to the 2014 Super Rugby season, but failed to make their final squad. Instead, he made five appearances for the Eastern Province Kings during the 2014 Vodacom Cup competition. He was selected in the starting line-up for the Eastern Province Kings side that faced Wales during a tour match during their 2014 tour to South Africa. He played for almost an hour in the match as the Kings suffered a 12–34 defeat.

With the Eastern Province Kings promoted to the 2014 Currie Cup Premier Division, Gqoboka made his first appearance in the Premier Division of this competition on 8 August 2014 when he was named in their run-on side for their opening match of the season against Western Province, which ended in a 16–35 defeat. Despite playing for an Eastern Province Kings side that performed poorly in the competition, he did weigh in with a try against the Blue Bulls to help earn his side a losing bonus point. He eventually made seven appearances in the competition as his side finished bottom of the log.

Gqoboka's personal performances didn't go unnoticed, however, as he earned an invitation to train with the Springboks in September 2014 alongside Nizaam Carr and Seabelo Senatla. He was once again invited to a Springbok training camp the following month.

Gqoboka left the Kings at the end of 2015, after the non-payment of player salaries allowed him to disengage himself from his contract. He joined Pretoria-based side the Bulls.

=== South Africa 'A' ===
In 2016, Gqoboka was included in a South Africa 'A' squad that played a two-match series against a touring England Saxons team. He came on as a replacement in their first match in Bloemfontein, but ended on the losing side as the visitors ran out 32–24 winners. He also played off the bench in the second match of the series, a 26–29 defeat to the Saxons in George.

== Honours ==
- Currie Cup winner 2020–21
- Pro14 Rainbow Cup runner-up 2021
- Bulls Currie Cup Player of the Year 2022
