= Nomcamba =

- Location within Eastern Cape Location within South Africa
- Coordinates: 31.875°S 29.051°E
- Country: South Africa
- Province: Eastern Cape
- District: OR Tambo
- Municipality: Nyandeni

Area
  - Total: 2.51 km^{2} (0.97 sq mi)

Population (2011)
  - Total: 1,129
  - Density: 450/km^{2} (1,160/sq mi)

Racial makeup (2011)
  - Black African: 99.3%
  - Coloured: 0.3%
  - Indian/Asian: 0.3%
  - White: 0.2%

First languages (2011)
  - Xhosa: 96.0%
  - English: 1.2%
  - Other: 2.7%
- Time zone: UTC+2 (SAST)

Nomcamba is a town in OR Tambo District Municipality in the Eastern Cape province of South Africa.
