= Libode =

- Location within Eastern Cape Location within South Africa
- Coordinates: 31°32′S 29°01′E
- Country: South Africa
- Province: Eastern Cape
- District: O.R. Tambo
- Municipality: Nyandeni

Area
  - Total: 3.93 km^{2} (1.52 sq mi)
- Elevation: 770 m (2,530 ft)

Population (2011)
  - Total: 4,560
  - Density: 1,160/km^{2} (3,010/sq mi)

Racial makeup (2011)
  - Black African: 98.9%
  - Coloured: 1.0%
  - Indian/Asian: 0.2%

First languages (2011)
  - isiXhosa: 92.3%
  - English: 2.7%
  - Other: 5.0%
- Time zone: UTC+2 (SAST)
- Postal code (street): 5160
- PO box: 5160
- Area code: 047

Libode is a small town of 5000 inhabitants in the Eastern Cape province of South Africa. It is situated on the R61 road (future N2 Wild Coast Toll Route) from Port St Johns in the east to Mthatha in the west and serves as the administrative seat of the Nyandeni Local Municipality, which is part of the OR Tambo District Municipality. As a small infrastructural hub for the surrounding rural area, Libode features a community college and a hospital, the St Barnabas Hospital.

== History ==
Libode is situated in an area formerly known as Pondoland. Mpondoland was annexed to the Cape Colony in 1894. In 1903 the Transkeian Territories General Council was established, and in 1911 the district of Libode was incorporated into the council.

In 1935 some land in the area of Libode was annexed by the Government of the Union of South Africa and the then Transkei government to develop the town of Libode and expand it. It was declared a Village Management area. Further land was dispossessed when the government implemented the Native Trust and Land Act of 1936. This was the subject of a successful land claim in 2009.

In 1940, some Catholic nuns from the Motherhouse St. Ursula in Brig, Switzerland were sent to Libode, which is currently the Ursuline group's main station in the region. Today they still run a multi-racial boarding-school.

On 15 December 1998 the City of Umtata was struck by a violent hail and thunderstorm that developed two tornado funnels that wreaked havoc across the city and surrounding rural areas. The tornado left 18 people dead, at least 184 injured and damage to property estimated at many millions of Rands. ... President Mandela declared the Libode Magisterial district to be a disaster area in terms of the Fund Raising Act 1978.

Nelson Mandela opened Mngazi School in Libode in 2002.

== Tourism ==
Near Libode is the Hluleka Nature Reserve and Hluleka Beach (60 km away), as well as Presely Bay (68 km).

== Notable people ==
- King Tutor Ndamase – 3rd and last president of the Bantustan of Transkei
