= Mqanduli =

- Location within Eastern Cape Location within South Africa
- Coordinates: 31°49′S 28°45′E
- Country: South Africa
- Province: Eastern Cape
- District: O.R. Tambo
- Municipality: King Sabata Dalindyebo

Area
  - Total: 9.88 km^{2} (3.81 sq mi)

Population (2011)
  - Total: 2,647
  - Density: 268/km^{2} (694/sq mi)

Racial makeup (2011)
  - Black African: 99.1%
  - Coloured: 0.3%
  - Indian/Asian: 0.3%
  - White: 0.2%
  - Other: 0.1%

First languages (2011)
  - Xhosa: 94.7%
  - English: 2.5%
  - Other: 2.8%
- Time zone: UTC+2 (SAST)
- Postal code (street): 5080
- PO box: 5080
- Area code: 047

Mqanduli is a town in OR Tambo District Municipality in the Eastern Cape province of South Africa.

Village 30 km south of Mthatha and 22 km north-east of Elliotdale. Named after a nearby hill; of Xhosa origin, the name is said to mean 'grindstone-maker', after a person living there.

== Geography ==
Mqanduli is located inland from the Wild Coast at approximately 31.817°S 28.750°E. The town covers an area of about 9.88 km². It is situated roughly 30 km south of Mthatha and about 22 km north-east of Elliotdale.

== Name and history ==
The name Mqanduli is of Xhosa origin and is said to derive from a nearby hill; local tradition reports the meaning as "grindstone-maker", named for a person associated with the place.

== Demographics ==
At the time of the 2011 national census the population of the main place of Mqanduli was recorded as 2,647 people. The population is predominately Black African and the dominant first language is Xhosa (2011 figures: Black African ≈ 99.1%; Xhosa ≈ 94.7%).

== Economy and services ==
Mqanduli functions as a local service centre for surrounding rural villages. The local economy is predominantly rural and community-oriented, with services, small-scale retail and subsistence agriculture in the wider area.

== Notable people ==
- Bantu Holomisa — prominent South African politician.
- Thandiswa Mazwai — singer-songwriter.
