= Ngqeleni =

- Location within Eastern Cape Location within South Africa
- Coordinates: 31.670°S 29.028°E
- Country: South Africa
- Province: Eastern Cape
- District: O.R. Tambo
- Municipality: Nyandeni

Area
  - Total: 2.28 km^{2} (0.88 sq mi)

Population (2011)
  - Total: 2,629
  - Density: 1,150/km^{2} (2,990/sq mi)

Racial makeup (2011)
  - Black African: 97.2%
  - Coloured: 1.6%
  - Indian/Asian: 0.3%
  - White: 0.3%
  - Other: 0.5%

First languages (2011)
  - Xhosa: 87.4%
  - English: 7.0%
  - Sign language: 1.6%
  - Northern Sotho: 1.1%
  - Other: 3.0%
- Time zone: UTC+2 (SAST)
- Postal code (street): 5140
- PO box: 5140
- Area code: 047

Ngqeleni is a town in OR Tambo District Municipality in the Eastern Cape province of South Africa.

Village in West Pondoland, 32 km southeast of Umtata and about 40 km north-north-west of Coffee Bay. The name is derived from the Xhosa ngqele, ‘cold’ or ‘frost’. Coldstream, which flows past it, may have a name translated from Ngqeleni, ‘at the cold’."
