= Ntabankulu Local Municipality elections =

Elections in Ntabankulu, South Africa

The Ntabankulu Local Municipality council consists of thirty-eight members elected by mixed-member proportional representation. Nineteen councillors are elected by first-past-the-post voting in nineteen wards, while the remaining nineteen are chosen from party lists so that the total number of party representatives is proportional to the number of votes received. In the election of 1 November 2021 the African National Congress (ANC) won a majority of thirty-one seats.

== Results ==
The following table shows the composition of the council after past elections.

Event	AIC	ANC	DA	EFF	Other	Total
2011 election	-	31	1	-	4	36
2016 election	1	29	2	2	0	34
2021 election	1	31	1	4	1	38

== May 2011 election ==
The following table shows the results of the 2011 election.

Party	Ward			List			Total seats
Party	Votes	%	Seats	Votes	%	Seats	Total seats
African National Congress	26,458	84.78	17	27,684	87.99	14	31
Congress of the People	2,034	6.52	0	2,032	6.46	2	2
Independent candidates	1,511	4.84	1				1
United Democratic Movement	619	1.98	0	697	2.22	1	1
Democratic Alliance	267	0.86	0	670	2.13	1	1
United Independent Front	297	0.95	0	243	0.77	0	0
National Freedom Party	20	0.06	0	137	0.44	0	0
Total	31,206	100.00	18	31,463	100.00	18	36
Valid votes	31,206	96.49		31,463	97.23		
Invalid/blank votes	1,135	3.51		896	2.77		
Total votes	32,341	100.00		32,359	100.00		
Registered voters/turnout	59,966	53.93		59,966	53.96		

== August 2016 election ==
The following table shows the results of the 2016 election.

Party	Ward			List			Total seats
Party	Votes	%	Seats	Votes	%	Seats	Total seats
African National Congress	29,115	86.34	17	28,038	83.87	12	29
Economic Freedom Fighters	1,924	5.71	0	1,778	5.32	2	2
Democratic Alliance	1,819	5.39	0	1,735	5.19	2	2
African Independent Congress	284	0.84	0	1,347	4.03	1	1
United Democratic Movement	15	0.04	0	391	1.17	0	0
Independent candidates	400	1.19	0				0
Abantu Democratic Revolution	166	0.49	0	141	0.42	0	0
Total	33,723	100.00	17	33,430	100.00	17	34
Valid votes	33,723	97.77		33,430	97.44		
Invalid/blank votes	769	2.23		880	2.56		
Total votes	34,492	100.00		34,310	100.00		
Registered voters/turnout	64,137	53.78		64,137	53.49		

== November 2021 election ==
The following table shows the results of the 2021 election.

Party	Ward			List			Total seats
Party	Votes	%	Seats	Votes	%	Seats	Total seats
African National Congress	25,752	81.48	19	25,540	80.93	12	31
Economic Freedom Fighters	3,483	11.02	0	3,710	11.76	4	4
African Transformation Movement	498	1.58	0	512	1.62	1	1
Democratic Alliance	439	1.39	0	440	1.39	1	1
African Independent Congress	251	0.79	0	499	1.58	1	1
Independent candidates	674	2.13	0				0
United Democratic Movement	271	0.86	0	326	1.03	0	0
God Save Africa	126	0.40	0	194	0.61	0	0
Socialist Party of South Africa	84	0.27	0	143	0.45	0	0
Patriotic Alliance	22	0.07	0	122	0.39	0	0
Independent South African National Civic Organisation	5	0.02	0	71	0.22	0	0
Total	31,605	100.00	19	31,557	100.00	19	38
Valid votes	31,605	97.77		31,557	97.28		
Invalid/blank votes	721	2.23		881	2.72		
Total votes	32,326	100.00		32,438	100.00		
Registered voters/turnout	67,099	48.18		67,099	48.34		

=== By-elections from November 2021 ===
The following by-elections were held to fill vacant ward seats in the period since November 2021.

Date	Ward	Party of the previous councillor	Party of the newly elected councillor
4 May 2022	24404011	African National Congress	African National Congress
