= Port St. Johns Local Municipality elections =

The Port St. Johns Local Municipality council consists of thirty-nine members elected by mixed-member proportional representation. Twenty councillors are elected by first-past-the-post voting in twenty wards, while the remaining nineteen are chosen from party lists so that the total number of party representatives is proportional to the number of votes received. In the election of 1 November 2021 the African National Congress (ANC) won a majority of thirty-one seats.

== Results ==
The following table shows the composition of the council after past elections.

Event	ANC	CIV	DA	EFF	IND	UDM	Other	Total
2000 election	18	—	—	—	1	6	—	25
2006 election	28	—	—	—	1	2	0	31
2011 election	32	—	2	—	3	1	1	39
2016 election	31	3	2	1	0	2	0	39
2021 election	31	1	1	3	0	1	2	39

== December 2000 election ==
The following table shows the results of the 2000 election.

Party	Ward			List			Total seats
Party	Votes	%	Seats	Votes	%	Seats	Total seats
African National Congress	17,843	70.22	12	18,893	74.27	6	18
United Democratic Movement	6,708	26.40	0	6,544	25.73	6	6
Independent candidates	858	3.38	1				1
Total	25,409	100.00	13	25,437	100.00	12	25
Valid votes	25,409	97.23		25,437	97.48		
Invalid/blank votes	725	2.77		658	2.52		
Total votes	26,134	100.00		26,095	100.00		
Registered voters/turnout	45,316	57.67		45,316	57.58		

== March 2006 election ==
The following table shows the results of the 2006 election.

Party	Ward			List			Total seats
Party	Votes	%	Seats	Votes	%	Seats	Total seats
African National Congress	29,776	79.79	15	32,080	90.35	13	28
Independent candidates	5,315	14.24	1				1
United Democratic Movement	1,801	4.83	0	2,690	7.58	2	2
United Independent Front	339	0.91	0	427	1.20	0	0
Pan Africanist Congress of Azania	85	0.23	0	308	0.87	0	0
Total	37,316	100.00	16	35,505	100.00	15	31
Valid votes	37,316	96.31		35,505	93.46		
Invalid/blank votes	1,428	3.69		2,484	6.54		
Total votes	38,744	100.00		37,989	100.00		
Registered voters/turnout	62,420	62.07		62,420	60.86		

== May 2011 election ==
The following table shows the results of the 2011 election.

Party	Ward			List			Total seats
Party	Votes	%	Seats	Votes	%	Seats	Total seats
African National Congress	29,073	76.87	17	31,451	87.81	15	32
Independent candidates	5,285	13.97	3				3
Democratic Alliance	1,659	4.39	0	1,488	4.15	2	2
United Democratic Movement	1,001	2.65	0	1,400	3.91	1	1
Congress of the People	793	2.10	0	1,210	3.38	1	1
African People's Convention	12	0.03	0	267	0.75	0	0
Total	37,823	100.00	20	35,816	100.00	19	39
Valid votes	37,823	97.32		35,816	93.08		
Invalid/blank votes	1,043	2.68		2,662	6.92		
Total votes	38,866	100.00		38,478	100.00		
Registered voters/turnout	68,019	57.14		68,019	56.57		

== August 2016 election ==
The following table shows the results of the 2016 election.

Party	Ward			List			Total seats
Party	Votes	%	Seats	Votes	%	Seats	Total seats
African National Congress	33,072	79.26	20	33,042	79.67	11	31
Civic Independent	2,762	6.62	0	2,588	6.24	3	3
Democratic Alliance	2,406	5.77	0	2,340	5.64	2	2
United Democratic Movement	1,692	4.06	0	1,877	4.53	2	2
Economic Freedom Fighters	1,243	2.98	0	1,184	2.85	1	1
Independent candidates	393	0.94	0				0
Congress of the People	134	0.32	0	241	0.58	0	0
Pan Africanist Congress of Azania	9	0.02	0	121	0.29	0	0
African Christian Democratic Party	14	0.03	0	83	0.20	0	0
Total	41,725	100.00	20	41,476	100.00	19	39
Valid votes	41,725	97.97		41,476	97.69		
Invalid/blank votes	866	2.03		982	2.31		
Total votes	42,591	100.00		42,458	100.00		
Registered voters/turnout	75,867	56.14		75,867	55.96		

== November 2021 election ==
The following table shows the results of the 2021 election.

Party	Ward			List			Total seats
Party	Votes	%	Seats	Votes	%	Seats	Total seats
African National Congress	26,293	69.10	20	29,469	78.50	11	31
Economic Freedom Fighters	2,355	6.19	0	2,840	7.57	3	3
Independent candidates	4,131	10.86	0				0
African Transformation Movement	1,555	4.09	0	1,567	4.17	2	2
Civic Independent	1,500	3.94	0	864	2.30	1	1
Democratic Alliance	1,044	2.74	0	1,265	3.37	1	1
United Democratic Movement	749	1.97	0	859	2.29	1	1
African Democrats	292	0.77	0	444	1.18	0	0
Independent South African National Civic Organisation	53	0.14	0	152	0.40	0	0
Batho Pele Movement	76	0.20	0	81	0.22	0	0
Total	38,048	100.00	20	37,541	100.00	19	39
Valid votes	38,048	97.15		37,541	96.55		
Invalid/blank votes	1,118	2.85		1,341	3.45		
Total votes	39,166	100.00		38,882	100.00		
Registered voters/turnout	76,248	51.37		76,248	50.99		

=== By-elections from November 2021 ===
The following by-elections were held to fill vacant ward seats in the period since the election in November 2021.

Date	Ward	Party of the previous councillor	Party of the newly elected councillor
14 Jun 2023	2	African National Congress	African National Congress
4 Dec 2024	11	African National Congress	African National Congress

After the resignation of the previous ward two councillor, a by-election was held on 14 June 2023. In 2021, the African National Congress (ANC) won the ward by 49 votes over independent candidate Patric Nomarhobo. For the by-election, it recruited Nomarhobo and won the seat with a solid 72% of the vote. The Democratic Alliance (DA) improved from 10% to 22% to finish second.
