= Nissan Shield =

Cricket tournament

The Nissan Shield was a one day cricket tournament in South Africa. This was a knockout competition based on the English Gillette Cup.

The first one was played in the 1969-70 season and was won by an Eddie Barlow XI representing Western Province. The tournament was known as :

- Gillette Cup 1969/70 - 1976/77
- Datsun Shield 1977/78 - 1982/83
- Nissan Shield 1983/84 - 1991/92
- Total Power Series 1992-93

== Format ==
The competition was a 60-over per side knockout tournament. It featured section A and B Currie Cup teams competing in the first round of eight, with the winners going through to the semi-finals, with a final at the Wanderers Stadium, Johannesburg.

A South Africa African XI composed of Black African players competed in 1975-76 and 1976-77. This inexperienced team lost their two games by over 200 runs with Alan Barrow scoring 202 not out for Natal in 1975.

For the 1980-81 season semi-final matches were the best of three. In 1981-82 the matches were 55 overs per side. For 1986-87 and 1987-88 there were two groups of four teams with the top two teams going through to the semi-finals. From the 1989-90 season minor teams and country teams were admitted to make a first round of 16 teams.

In the 1990-91 season substitutes were permitted with 14 players named and 6 substitutes allowed. This was introduced to "encourage inventiveness and enterprise" The following season, 1991–92, the competition reverted to 11 per side as South Africa had been re-admitted to the ICC. The final season's, 1992–93, matches were 50 overs per side. The Benson and Hedges Series, now known as the MTN Domestic Championship, is South Africa's domestic one-day tournament.

Transvaal was the most successful team. Their "Mean Machine" side, mainly led by Clive Rice, won the competition seven times in eight years between 1979 and 1986.

== Winners ==
Gillette Cup

- 1969-70 Eddie Barlow XI (Western Province)
- 1970-71 Western Province
- 1971-72 Eastern Province
- 1972-73 Western Province
- 1973-74 Transvaal
- 1974-75 Natal
- 1975-76 Eastern Province
- 1976-77 Natal

Datsun Shield

- 1977-78 Rhodesia
- 1978-79 Transvaal
- 1979-80 Transvaal
- 1980-81 Transvaal
- 1981-82 Western Province
- 1982-83 Transvaal

Nissan Shield

- 1983-84 Transvaal
- 1984-85 Transvaal
- 1985-86 Transvaal
- 1986-87 Natal
- 1987-88 Eastern Province
- 1988-89 Western Province
- 1989-90 Eastern Province
- 1990-91 Transvaal
- 1991-92 Orange Free State

Total Power Series

- 1992-93 Orange Free State

Transvaal won 9 times, Western Province and Eastern Province 4 each, Natal 3, Orange Free State 2, Rhodesia and Eddie Barlow XI 1 each.
