= Umzimvubu Local Municipality elections =

The Umzimvubu Local Municipality council consists of fifty-five members elected by mixed-member proportional representation. Twenty-eight councillors are elected by first-past-the-post voting in twenty-eight wards, while the remaining twenty-seven are chosen from party lists so that the total number of party representatives is proportional to the number of votes received. In the election of 1 November 2021 the African National Congress (ANC) won a majority of forty-two seats.

== Results ==
The following table shows the composition of the council after past elections.

Event	AIC	ANC	DA	EFF	UDM	Other	Total
2006 election	—	43	—	—	3	1	47
2011 election	2	46	2	—	2	2	54
2016 election	2	41	4	3	3	0	53
2021 election	1	42	2	6	2	2	55

== March 2006 election ==
The following table shows the results of the 2006 election.

Party	Ward			List			Total seats
Party	Votes	%	Seats	Votes	%	Seats	Total seats
African National Congress	41,683	91.27	24	42,012	91.94	19	43
United Democratic Movement	2,499	5.47	0	2,715	5.94	3	3
Pan Africanist Congress of Azania	724	1.59	0	536	1.17	1	1
Inkatha Freedom Party	252	0.55	0	430	0.94	0	0
Independent candidates	513	1.12	0				0
Total	45,671	100.00	24	45,693	100.00	23	47
Valid votes	45,671	97.94		45,693	97.85		
Invalid/blank votes	962	2.06		1,006	2.15		
Total votes	46,633	100.00		46,699	100.00		
Registered voters/turnout	83,703	55.71		83,703	55.79		

== May 2011 election ==
The following table shows the results of the 2011 election.

Party	Ward			List			Total seats
Party	Votes	%	Seats	Votes	%	Seats	Total seats
African National Congress	39,358	79.76	26	39,906	83.65	20	46
Independent candidates	5,070	10.27	1				1
United Democratic Movement	1,975	4.00	0	2,225	4.66	2	2
African Independent Congress	970	1.97	0	2,629	5.51	2	2
Democratic Alliance	1,092	2.21	0	1,472	3.09	2	2
Congress of the People	480	0.97	0	1,078	2.26	1	1
Pan Africanist Congress of Azania	399	0.81	0	397	0.83	0	0
Total	49,344	100.00	27	47,707	100.00	27	54
Valid votes	49,344	97.21		47,707	94.55		
Invalid/blank votes	1,414	2.79		2,750	5.45		
Total votes	50,758	100.00		50,457	100.00		
Registered voters/turnout	92,039	55.15		92,039	54.82		

== August 2016 election ==
The following table shows the results of the 2016 election.

Party	Ward			List			Total seats
Party	Votes	%	Seats	Votes	%	Seats	Total seats
African National Congress	42,233	77.58	27	41,767	76.73	14	41
Democratic Alliance	4,178	7.67	0	3,666	6.73	4	4
United Democratic Movement	2,866	5.26	0	4,079	7.49	3	3
Economic Freedom Fighters	2,658	4.88	0	2,600	4.78	3	3
African Independent Congress	1,783	3.28	0	2,322	4.27	2	2
Independent candidates	720	1.32	0				0
Total	54,438	100.00	27	54,434	100.00	26	53
Valid votes	54,438	97.19		54,434	96.99		
Invalid/blank votes	1,574	2.81		1,692	3.01		
Total votes	56,012	100.00		56,126	100.00		
Registered voters/turnout	103,439	54.15		103,439	54.26		

== November 2021 election ==
The following table shows the results of the 2021 election.

Party	Ward			List			Total seats
Party	Votes	%	Seats	Votes	%	Seats	Total seats
African National Congress	38,169	77.60	28	37,352	76.09	14	42
Economic Freedom Fighters	4,884	9.93	0	4,955	10.09	6	6
Democratic Alliance	2,042	4.15	0	2,018	4.11	2	2
African Transformation Movement	1,352	2.75	0	1,370	2.79	2	2
United Democratic Movement	1,264	2.57	0	1,310	2.67	2	2
African Independent Congress	585	1.19	0	1,448	2.95	1	1
Socialist Revolutionary Workers Party	330	0.67	0	208	0.42	0	0
Independent candidates	379	0.77	0				0
Socialist Party of South Africa	99	0.20	0	241	0.49	0	0
Independent South African National Civic Organisation	86	0.17	0	188	0.38	0	0
Total	49,190	100.00	28	49,090	100.00	27	55
Valid votes	49,190	97.93		49,090	97.79		
Invalid/blank votes	1,042	2.07		1,111	2.21		
Total votes	50,232	100.00		50,201	100.00		
Registered voters/turnout	106,760	47.05		106,760	47.02		
