= Port St. Johns Local Municipality =

Coordinates: 31°37′42″S 29°32′16″E

Port St Johns
- Local municipality
- Seal

- Location in the Eastern Cape
- Country: South Africa
- Province: Eastern Cape
- District: OR Tambo
- Seat: Port St. Johns
- Wards: 20

Government
  - Type: Municipal council
  - Mayor: Nomvuzo Mlombile-Cingo (ANC)
  - Speaker: Bulelwa Nokhanda (ANC)
  - Chief Whip: Cebisa Mazuza (ANC)

Area
  - Total: 1,291 km^{2} (498 sq mi)

Population (2011)
  - Total: 156,136
  - Density: 120.9/km^{2} (313.2/sq mi)

Racial makeup (2011)
  - Black African: 99.3%
  - Coloured: 0.4%
  - Indian/Asian: 0.1%
  - White: 0.2%

First languages (2011)
  - Xhosa: 95.0%
  - English: 2.7%
  - Other: 2.3%
- Time zone: UTC+2 (SAST)
- Municipal code: EC154

Port St. Johns Municipality (Xhosa: uMasipala wase Port St. Johns) is a local municipality within the OR Tambo District Municipality, in the Eastern Cape province of South Africa.

== Geography ==
Port St. Johns Local Municipality is a Class B municipality. The municipality is named after its only large town, Port St. Johns the administrative center.

It is bounded on the southeast and south by the Indian Ocean; to the southwest and west by the Nyandeni Local Municipality, and in part the Mnenu River; and to the northwest, north and northeast by the Ingquza Hill Local Municipality (Qaukeni) and in part the Mzintlava River. The major river in the municipality is the Mzimvubu River, and the large town of Port St. Johns is at the mouth of the Mzimvubu.

The municipality consists of 16 wards and covers a total area of 1239 square kilometers (8800 hectares). There are over 130 villages in the municipality.

The interior of the municipality is rugged with some small arable areas.

== History ==
The municipality lies near the center of the coastal region of Mpondoland (Pondoland), the area formerly part of the Mpondo Kingdom and a traditional home of the Mpondo people. When the Kingdom split in two around 1846, the Port St. Johns area became part of Western Mpondoland under King Ndamase, as a result of a disagreement with his father King Faku, even though in theory Ndamase still owed fealty to his father.

In 1869 the British government of the Cape Colony offered the Mpondo king, Ndamase, a substantial sum of money for the Port St. Johns area, but Ndamase refused the offer. Cape Colony renewed the offer in 1874, but Ndamase remained adamant. However after Ndamase died in 1876, his successor Nqwiliso, readily agreed and in 1878, Nqwiliso ceded the Port St Johns area to the Cape Colony in exchange for £1000 and recognition as the ruler of the Western Mpondo Kingdom.

The town of Port St Johns was founded in 1884, taking its name from the earlier Portuguese "Sâo Joâo" at the area was called. It is unclear whether the Portuguese name was derived from a wreaked ship of the same name that foundered there, or from the silhouette of a rock face that reminded the sailors of the apostle. However, before 1552 the locality was known to the Portuguese as "Sâo Christovâo".

In 1960 the population of the municipality generally did not participated in the Mpondo Revolt. However, the murder of Headman Aaron Majali of Majola on 26 September 1960 by fifteen youths from Ntlanjana and Guduza was definitely related.

From 1959 to 1994, the municipality was part of the bantustan of Transkei.

== Main languages ==
The 2001 census recorded the following first languages: 98.69% IsiXhosa; 0.64% English; 0.20% Afrikaans; 0.13% IsiZulu; 0.12% SiSwati; 0.08% IsiNdebele; 0.06% Sesotho; and 0.08% other languages.

== Politics ==
The municipal council consists of thirty-nine members elected by mixed-member proportional representation. Twenty councillors are elected by first-past-the-post voting in twenty wards, while the remaining nineteen are chosen from party lists so that the total number of party representatives is proportional to the number of votes received. In the election of 1 November 2021 the African National Congress (ANC) won a majority of thirty-one seats on the council. The following table shows the results of the election.

Party	Ward			List			Total seats
Party	Votes	%	Seats	Votes	%	Seats	Total seats
African National Congress	26,293	69.10	20	29,469	78.50	11	31
Economic Freedom Fighters	2,355	6.19	0	2,840	7.57	3	3
Independent candidates	4,131	10.86	0				0
African Transformation Movement	1,555	4.09	0	1,567	4.17	2	2
Civic Independent	1,500	3.94	0	864	2.30	1	1
Democratic Alliance	1,044	2.74	0	1,265	3.37	1	1
United Democratic Movement	749	1.97	0	859	2.29	1	1
3 other parties	421	1.11	0	677	1.80	0	0
Total	38,048	100.00	20	37,541	100.00	19	39
Valid votes	38,048	97.15		37,541	96.55		
Invalid/blank votes	1,118	2.85		1,341	3.45		
Total votes	39,166	100.00		38,882	100.00		
Registered voters/turnout	76,248	51.37		76,248	50.99		

== Main places ==
The 2001 census divided the municipality into the following main places:

Place	Code	Area (km^{2})	Population	Most spoken language
Amakwalo	23301	57.81	5,165	Xhosa
Bomvini	23302	253.67	25,094	Xhosa
Emtweni	23303	221.68	22,729	Xhosa
Gunyeni	23304	63.03	15,408	Xhosa
Manzamhlophe	23305	133.75	13,394	Xhosa
Mvumelwano	23306	315.70	31,342	Xhosa
Ndluzula	23307	195.11	22,123	Xhosa
Port St Johns Part 1	23308	8.79	5,181	Xhosa
Port St Johns Part 2	23310	0.80	289	Xhosa
Qaukeni	23309	37.94	5,420	Xhosa
