= Ingquza Hill Local Municipality elections =

Elections in South Africa

The Ingquza Hill Local Municipality council consists of sixty-four members elected by mixed-member proportional representation. Thirty-two councillors are elected by first-past-the-post voting in thirty-two wards, while the remaining thirty-two are chosen from party lists so that the total number of party representatives is proportional to the number of votes received. In the election of 1 November 2021 the African National Congress (ANC) won a majority of forty-six seats.

== Results ==
The following table shows the composition of the council after past elections.

Event	ANC	COPE	DA	EFF	PAC	UDM	Other	Total
2000 election	40	-	-	-	-	9	1	50
2006 election	50	-	-	-	1	2	1	54
2011 election	55	4	1	-	1	1	0	62
2016 election	53	1	2	4	0	1	2	63
2021 election	46	0	2	6	0	1	9	64

== December 2000 election ==
The following table shows the results of the 2000 election.

Party	Ward			List			Total seats
Party	Votes	%	Seats	Votes	%	Seats	Total seats
African National Congress	32,219	79.95	25	34,058	80.44	15	40
United Democratic Movement	7,327	18.18	0	7,498	17.71	9	9
African Christian Democratic Party	387	0.96	0	782	1.85	1	1
Independent candidates	364	0.90	0				0
Total	40,297	100.00	25	42,338	100.00	25	50
Valid votes	40,297	97.29		42,338	97.19		
Invalid/blank votes	1,124	2.71		1,225	2.81		
Total votes	41,421	100.00		43,563	100.00		
Registered voters/turnout	87,881	47.13		87,881	49.57		

== March 2006 election ==
The following table shows the results of the 2006 election.

Party	Ward			List			Total seats
Party	Votes	%	Seats	Votes	%	Seats	Total seats
African National Congress	53,056	86.70	27	54,476	92.80	23	50
Independent candidates	4,742	7.75	0				0
United Democratic Movement	1,568	2.56	0	2,006	3.42	2	2
United Independent Front	909	1.49	0	962	1.64	1	1
Pan Africanist Congress of Azania	484	0.79	0	652	1.11	1	1
African Christian Democratic Party	438	0.72	0	608	1.04	0	0
Total	61,197	100.00	27	58,704	100.00	27	54
Valid votes	61,197	97.90		58,704	95.22		
Invalid/blank votes	1,310	2.10		2,948	4.78		
Total votes	62,507	100.00		61,652	100.00		
Registered voters/turnout	110,610	56.51		110,610	55.74		

== May 2011 election ==
The following table shows the results of the 2011 election.

Party	Ward			List			Total seats
Party	Votes	%	Seats	Votes	%	Seats	Total seats
African National Congress	56,626	88.66	31	56,846	89.36	24	55
Congress of the People	4,151	6.50	0	4,046	6.36	4	4
United Democratic Movement	947	1.48	0	967	1.52	1	1
Democratic Alliance	688	1.08	0	1,024	1.61	1	1
Pan Africanist Congress of Azania	923	1.45	0	483	0.76	1	1
African Christian Democratic Party	537	0.84	0	248	0.39	0	0
Total	63,872	100.00	31	63,614	100.00	31	62
Valid votes	63,872	97.37		63,614	98.13		
Invalid/blank votes	1,723	2.63		1,210	1.87		
Total votes	65,595	100.00		64,824	100.00		
Registered voters/turnout	121,851	53.83		121,851	53.20		

== August 2016 election ==
The following table shows the results of the 2016 election.

Party	Ward			List			Total seats
Party	Votes	%	Seats	Votes	%	Seats	Total seats
African National Congress	57,013	83.54	31	57,800	83.44	22	53
Economic Freedom Fighters	3,897	5.71	0	4,073	5.88	4	4
Democratic Alliance	2,491	3.65	0	2,345	3.39	2	2
United Democratic Movement	1,442	2.11	1	1,590	2.30	0	1
African Independent Congress	401	0.59	0	2,046	2.95	1	1
Independent candidates	1,593	2.33	0				0
African People's Convention	474	0.69	0	438	0.63	1	1
Congress of the People	422	0.62	0	483	0.70	1	1
African Christian Democratic Party	243	0.36	0	137	0.20	0	0
African People's Socialist Party	193	0.28	0	151	0.22	0	0
Pan Africanist Congress of Azania	81	0.12	0	208	0.30	0	0
Total	68,250	100.00	32	69,271	100.00	31	63
Valid votes	68,250	96.70		69,271	97.11		
Invalid/blank votes	2,328	3.30		2,058	2.89		
Total votes	70,578	100.00		71,329	100.00		
Registered voters/turnout	136,794	51.59		136,794	52.14		

== November 2021 election ==
The following table shows the results of the 2021 election.

Party	Ward			List			Total seats
Party	Votes	%	Seats	Votes	%	Seats	Total seats
African National Congress	41,478	67.23	28	44,529	75.84	18	46
Economic Freedom Fighters	5,156	8.36	0	5,530	9.42	6	6
Independent candidates	7,658	12.41	4				4
Civic Independent	1,771	2.87	0	2,068	3.52	2	2
Democratic Alliance	1,814	2.94	0	1,513	2.58	2	2
African Transformation Movement	1,211	1.96	0	1,369	2.33	1	1
United Democratic Movement	1,062	1.72	0	1,184	2.02	1	1
African Independent Congress	382	0.62	0	972	1.66	1	1
African People's Convention	486	0.79	0	411	0.70	1	1
Congress of the People	292	0.47	0	392	0.67	0	0
Pan Africanist Congress of Azania	184	0.30	0	244	0.42	0	0
African Christian Democratic Party	193	0.31	0	185	0.32	0	0
Inkatha Freedom Party	6	0.01	0	321	0.55	0	0
Total	61,693	100.00	32	58,718	100.00	32	64
Valid votes	61,693	97.50		58,718	94.55		
Invalid/blank votes	1,581	2.50		3,383	5.45		
Total votes	63,274	100.00		62,101	100.00		
Registered voters/turnout	139,517	45.35		139,517	44.51		

=== By-elections from November 2021 ===
The following by-elections were held to fill vacant ward seats in the period since the election in November 2021.

Date	Ward	Party of the previous councillor	Party of the newly elected councillor
8 March 2023	15	African National Congress	African National Congress

In a by-election in ward 15, held on 8 March 2023 after the previous ANC councillor was assassinated, the ANC candidate retained the seat for the party with a solid majority.
