= Jerry Masslo =

South African refugee living in Italy (1959–1989)

- Born: 4 December 1959; Mthatha, South Africa
- Died: 25 August 1989 (aged 29); Villa Literno, Italy
- Cause of death: Murder
- Occupation: Fruit picker

Jerry Essan Masslo (4 December 1959 – 25 August 1989) was a South African refugee living in Italy who was murdered by a gang of criminals. His case deeply affected public opinion on racism in Italy and led to a reform of Italian legislation regarding the recognition of refugee status. The killing of Masslo resulted in the acknowledgement of the need to guarantee adequate rights and duties to immigrants, whose number had grown considerably in the 1980s, reaching 600,000 by 1990 according to some sources; 1.3 million according to others.

Shortly after his death, the largest anti-racist demonstration in the country was organized in Rome, attended by 200,000 people. The story of the non-recognition of refugee status to citizens of countries outside Eastern Europe led the government to rapidly issue a decree-law before the end of the year, later converted into the Martelli Law. The law would function as an amnesty law, and recognize the status of non-European foreigners under the mandate of the United Nations High Commissioner for Refugees and eliminated the "geographical limitation" for political asylum seekers (as was already established by the Geneva Convention of 1951). Masslo's death is seen as the beginning of a new chapter in multi-ethnic coexistence in Italy.

== Early life and immigration ==
Jerry Masslo was born in 1959 in Umtata (present-day Mthatha in the Eastern Cape province of South Africa), which was between 1976 and 1994 the capital of Transkei, a former bantustan (nominally independent land, set aside for black people during the apartheid regime). He lived there in impoverished conditions in a hut made of wood and metal sheets, but yet managed to continue his studies in schools that were 'for blacks only'. Masslo's father died during a black rights demonstration together with Masslo's seven-year-old daughter, who was killed by a stray bullet.

Masslo was a politically active student, and was sympathetic to the mass civil rights movement for black people (such as African National Congress, United Democratic Front and Black Consciousness Movement) that opposed apartheid. After the Transkei coup d'état of 1987, Masslo got his wife and two children to escape via Zimbabwe and eventually reached Lusaka (Zambia) where some of his family lived in exile.

Helped by a friend, he travelled clandestinely, together with his younger brother, on a Nigerian cargo ship, hidden in a lifeboat and eating its emergency rations. When his brother developed a fever, Masslo left the ship in Port Harcourt (Nigeria) to buy medicine, but was unable to rejoin the ship before it continued its journey. He would never see his brother again. After selling his remaining possessions (including a gold watch from his father) he managed to buy a plane ticket to Rome, where he landed on 21 March 1988.

Upon arrival in Italy, he immediately applied for political asylum with the security authorities. Under the principle of 'geographic limitation', they were instructed to refuse his request, because under their instructions political asylum could only be requested by citizens of Eastern European countries that were escaping communist regimes. Faced with the refusal, Masslo asked to be put in telephone contact with the Italian headquarters of Amnesty International, who put him in contact with the United Nations High Commissioner for Refugees (UNHCR). The Interior Ministry decided that he could not be granted asylum because not only was there the geographic restriction, there was also the matter that most of his fellow countrymen faced the same problems, and there was no personal persecution. UNHCR negotiated with the Interior Ministry, and after some weeks in an airport cell, he eventually obtained entry permission with refugee status recognised by the United Nations but not by Italy: however, Italy would not force him to return to South Africa.

At 3 May 1988, Masslo was welcomed by the Community of Sant'Egidio at the request of Amnesty in their 'Tent of Abraham' at the via Veneziani in the center of Rome. The organization housed many refugees from various countries, mostly from Africa. He applied there to be expatriated to Canada, indicating his desire to be reunited with his wife and children. The Canadian representation in Rome was willing to hear his case, but there were many bureaucratic hurdles to overcome. He started to learn Italian and took on occasional jobs, sending any leftover money to his family. In the summer of 1988, he decided to travel to Villa Literno, close to Naples, where he heard would be opportunities to work in the tomato harvest.

== Working at Villa Literno ==
With Masslo, thousands of immigrants travelled to Villa Literno to look for work, year after year, under harsh conditions. The area at that time mainly earned its income from agriculture, and a predominant role was played by the Casalesi clan of the Camorra. The tomato fields were subsidized by both the Italian government and the European Communities and required during the harvest the massive use of labour force at low prices, for which farmers were unable to find Italian labourers. Migrants moved around seasonally as work was requested. During the harvest, the town's population would increase from its usual 10,000 inhabitants to include 4,000 immigrants.

Each morning, Masslo would join hundreds of immigrants at the crossroads of the village, nicknamed by locals as "piazza degli schiavi" (slaves' square) where the "caporalato" (illegal intermediary recruiter) would collect them to go to the fields for the harvest. The job could last up to 14 hours per day and was paid per box. In order to collect a daily wage of 40,000 lire (at the time equivalent to about $30–40), the workers had to harvest 40 crates of 25 kg (55 lb) each. At night, Masslo would stay like most immigrants in the ruins of farmhouses, sleeping on cardboard without light or a toilet.

At the end of harvest season, after two months, Masslo moved back to the Tent of Abraham in Rome. His visa for Canada did not arrive, and in the summer of 1989 he returned to Villa Literno for another harvest season. This time, there was a growing awareness in the barracks where immigrants slept that they were being exploited – especially as the pay per crate went down from 1,000 to 800 lire because of an over-supply of labour. Masslo attended meetings where immigrants had appealed to the union but encountered resistance. At the same time, acceptance by the locals was decreasing – and resistance was growing, both lawful and unlawful. Not only were signatures being collected to send the foreigners away, but episodes of intolerance were also multiplying, and immigrants could no longer walk freely in the city in fear to be attacked by local adolescent males who had organised themselves into squadrons (that were characterised as similar to those of the Ku Klux Klan) and terrorised the immigrants to stay away from the city centre. Some businesses declared themselves 'off limits' to foreigners. The carabinieri (police) found leaflets addressed to the inhabitants of the village, inciting violence against immigrants. The situation was getting the attention of the media, and a Tg2 camera crew interviewed immigrants, including Masslo, about their conditions.

== Murder ==
When the harvest was nearly over, on the evening of 24 August 1989, Masslo returned to a shed at Via Gallinelle (in the town), where he slept with 28 other migrants. A group of thugs raided them, keeping their faces covered, with weapons and bars and demanding money. Because the immigrants were not able to deposit their earnings, they still had most of their two months' earnings on them. Some of the migrants immediately handed over the money (an estimated 1.5 million lire), while others refused. Consequently, the thieves struck the 29-year-old Sudanese Ayuel Bol Yansen with the back of a gun. The situation deteriorated and one of the robbers shot his 7.65 caliber pistol three times at Masslo and another worker. The thugs fled in fear of a mass response by the immigrants. The Kenyan Kirago Antony Yrugo survived but Masslo died.

The Italian General Confederation of Labour (CGIL) asked for a state funeral for Masslo, which was held on 28 August in the presence of Minister of Foreign Affairs Gianni De Michelis and other representatives and media. Tg2 broadcast the funeral live, as well as a quote from Masslo's earlier interview:

I thought that I would find a place to live in Italy, a wave of civilization, a welcome that would allow me to live in peace and to cultivate the dream of a tomorrow without barriers or prejudices. Instead, I am disappointed. Having a black skin in this country is a limit to civil coexistence. Racism is also here: it is made of arrogance, of abuses, of daily violence to those who ask for nothing but solidarity and respect. We in the third world are contributing to the development of your country, but it does not seem to matter. Sooner or later, some of us will be killed and then we will realize that we exist.

— Jerry Masslo (translated from Italian),

After the service, Masslo was buried in an anonymous tomb in the municipal cemetery of Villa Literno.

Three young men were convicted a year later and sentenced to prison sentences of 24.5, 24.5 and 22 years. A fourth killer was a minor at the time of the murder and was sentenced to 12 years imprisonment. The three admitted to participating in the robbery, but none confessed to shooting him. They claimed that the murder was not racially motivated but rather intended as a robbery of easy targets.

== Reactions and subsequent developments ==
The death of Masslo reached a wide audience within Italy, with headlines on the front pages of several major newspapers. The national broadcaster TG3 opened the news with "Death squad at Villa Literno shoots black workers." Prominent figures spoke out against the act, including Pope John Paul II, who condemned the murder and called Masslo a "victim of intolerance" and the president of the republic, Francesco Cossiga.

It was not the first racist incident in the country to make the news: an Ethiopian woman had been forced to give up a seat on the bus, and a black man was thrown out of a window by another gang in Naples. On 20 September the same year, a first strike by immigrants was held against the caporalato in service of the Camorra. Masslo's death galvanized a much greater public discussion of immigration and opposition to racism. On 7 October, Italy's largest-yet national demonstration against racism took place in Rome, with 200,000 participants from Italy and abroad. In February 1990, the Martelli Law was implemented, a first attempt to tackle immigration issues in Italy.

In the subsequent summer, a tent city in Villa Literno called "Village of Solidarity" was built and named after Jerry Masslo to welcome the immigrant workers and provide them support. In the following years, despite the media attention, the condition of immigrants in the countryside around Villa Literno did not get adequate support. The difficult sanitary conditions of the settlement in which the labourers lived made it receive the name Ghetto di Villa Literno.
