= King Sabata Dalindyebo Local Municipality =

King Sabata Dalindyebo
- Local municipality
- Seal

- Location in the Eastern Cape
- Coordinates: 31°35′02″S 28°47′17″E
- Country: South Africa
- Province: Eastern Cape
- District: OR Tambo
- Seat: Mthatha
- Wards: 35

Government
  - Type: Municipal council
  - Mayor: Goodman Nyaniso Nelani (ANC)
  - Speaker: Thandeka Grace Maqoko (ANC)
  - Chief Whip: Mzukisi Nyoka (ANC)

Area
  - Total: 3,027 km^{2} (1,169 sq mi)

Population (2011)
  - Total: 451,710
  - Density: 149.2/km^{2} (386.5/sq mi)

Racial makeup (2011)
  - Black African: 98.5%
  - Coloured: 0.8%
  - Indian/Asian: 0.3%
  - White: 0.3%

First languages (2011)
  - Xhosa: 92.8%
  - English: 3.6%
  - Other: 3.6%
- Time zone: UTC+2 (SAST)
- Municipal code: EC157
- Website: http://ksd.gov.za/

King Sabata Dalindyebo Municipality (Xhosa: uMasipala wase King Sabata Dalindyebo) is a local municipality situated in the inland of the Eastern Cape province of South Africa. The municipality includes the towns of Mthatha and Mqanduli. The King Sabata Dalindyebo Municipality is one of the seven local municipalities within the OR Tambo District Municipality.

The King Sabata Dalindyebo Local Municipality was established before the 2000 local government elections when the Mthatha and Mqanduli transitional and rural areas were merged. The municipality was named after King Sabata Dalindyebo because his great place was in the region and he was seen as a hero who fought for the freedom of Transkei and South Africa.

== Main places ==
The 2001 census divided the municipality into the following main places:

Place	Code	Area (km^{2})	Population
Baziya	23601	179.46	13,737
Cacadu	23602	60.66	6,345
Coffee Bay	23603	0.86	295
Ebotwe	23604	186.95	15,939
Gcaleka-Ngchana	23605	4.54	309
Hagebe	23606	154.11	17,262
Hala	23607	90.10	10,140
Jalamba	23608	7.70	650
Jumba	23609	197.35	13,492
Masizakhe	23610	19.41	2,363
Matyengqina	23611	202.58	20,416
Mhlanga	23612	21.61	6,503
Mpeko	23613	99.30	26,202
Mqanduli	23614	9.61	2,357
Mqekezweni	23615	288.67	22,497
Ngqubusini	23616	5.05	558
Ngubezulu	23617	1.02	0
Nqabe	23618	242.02	23,962
Nqanda	23619	21.84	2,882
Qiya	23620	229.37	22,874
Qokolweni/Zimbane	23621	98.37	21,996
Rarabe	23622	23.37	1,542
Sithebe	23623	63.25	8,144
Tshezi	23624	115.34	14,377
Tshomane	23625	182.78	21,843
Umtata Part 1	23626	64.70	92,469
Umtata Part 2	23630	29.57	2,316
Upper Ncise-Kambi	23627	230.24	23,013
Xesibe	23628	113.33	15,094
Xongora	23629	72.52	5,659

== Politics ==
The municipal council consists of seventy-two members elected by mixed-member proportional representation. Thirty-seven councillors are elected by first-past-the-post voting in thirty-six wards, while the remaining thirty-six are chosen from party lists so that the total number of party representatives is proportional to the number of votes received. In the election of 1 November 2021 the African National Congress (ANC) won a majority of forty-eight seats on the council. The following table shows the results of the election.

Party	Ward			List			Total seats
Party	Votes	%	Seats	Votes	%	Seats	Total seats
African National Congress	51,561	64.89	36	50,270	63.63	12	48
United Democratic Movement	10,795	13.59	0	12,887	16.31	11	11
Economic Freedom Fighters	5,515	6.94	0	5,533	7.00	5	5
African Transformation Movement	3,476	4.37	0	3,937	4.98	3	3
Independent candidates	4,326	5.44	1				1
Democratic Alliance	1,460	1.84	0	1,562	1.98	1	1
African Independent Congress	50	0.06	0	1,616	2.05	1	1
Civic Independent	441	0.56	0	938	1.19	1	1
Mthatha Ratepayers and Residents Association	555	0.70	0	811	1.03	1	1
Independent South African National Civic Organisation	748	0.94	0	603	0.76	1	1
Pan Africanist Congress of Azania	506	0.64	0	500	0.63	0	0
South African Security Organisation	21	0.03	0	200	0.25	0	0
God Save Africa				148	0.19	0	0
Total	79,454	100.00	37	79,005	100.00	36	73
Valid votes	79,454	97.74		79,005	97.03		
Invalid/blank votes	1,836	2.26		2,415	2.97		
Total votes	81,290	100.00		81,420	100.00		
Registered voters/turnout	206,563	39.35		206,563	39.42		
