= Mount Ayliff =

Mount Ayliff eMaxesibeni
- Location within Eastern Cape Location within South Africa
- Coordinates: 30°48′33″S 29°22′01″E
- Country: South Africa
- Province: Eastern Cape
- District: Alfred Nzo
- Municipality: Umzimvubu

Area
  - Total: 3.32 km^{2} (1.28 sq mi)

Population (2011)
  - Total: 5,367
  - Density: 1,620/km^{2} (4,190/sq mi)

Racial makeup (2011)
  - Black African: 98.2%
  - Coloured: 0.8%
  - Indian/Asian: 0.4%
  - White: 0.4%
  - Other: 0.3%

First languages (2011)
  - Xhosa: 91.5%
  - English: 2.9%
  - Zulu: 1.4%
  - Other: 4.2%
- Time zone: UTC+2 (SAST)
- Postal code (street): 4735
- PO box: 4735
- Area code: 039

Mount Ayliff, officially eMaxesibeni, is a small town in the Eastern Cape province of South Africa, near that province's border with KwaZulu-Natal.

Mount Ayliff is located in the Umzimvubu Local Municipality, which is part of the Alfred Nzo District Municipality; it is the location of the headquarters of the latter.

Xesibeland, the traditional region of the Xesibe people, was located around Mount Ayliff. The Xesibe was led by Chief Jojo; Jojo today is the royal family and still the leading family in EmaXesibeni.

== History ==
It was possibly named in 1878 after either William Ayliff, a Cape government official for native affairs or John Ayliff, a mission station founder.

=== 1999 tornado ===
On 18 January 1999, a number of tornadoes hit the town and surrounding areas. Twenty five people were killed and over 500 were injured; the tornadoes destroyed around 95% of the homes in the area leaving most people homeless making it the most destructive tornado recorded in South Africa.

=== Mount Ayliff Christmas Day Massacre ===
The town was the scene of a mass shooting incident between a group of Mpeni and Nokhatshile men on Christmas Day 2020, in which at least seven people died and at least six were injured. Following a search for suspects led by the SANDF, seven people, all injured in the incident, were arrested. The incident was the result of a conflict between competing mini-bus taxi operators in the area.

== Geography ==
Mount Ayliff is located in a mountainous valley, hence the word "Mount". It is located just 26 km south-west of the KwaZulu-Natal border and is also located 34 km south of Kokstad and 144 km north-east of Mthatha on the N2 national route. The nearest city to Mount Ayliff is Durban which is 283 km north-east of the town.

== Demographics ==
In the census of 2011, its population was recorded as being 5,367 people, of whom 98% described themselves as "Black African", and 91.5% spoke Xhosa as their first language.
