= Port St. Johns =

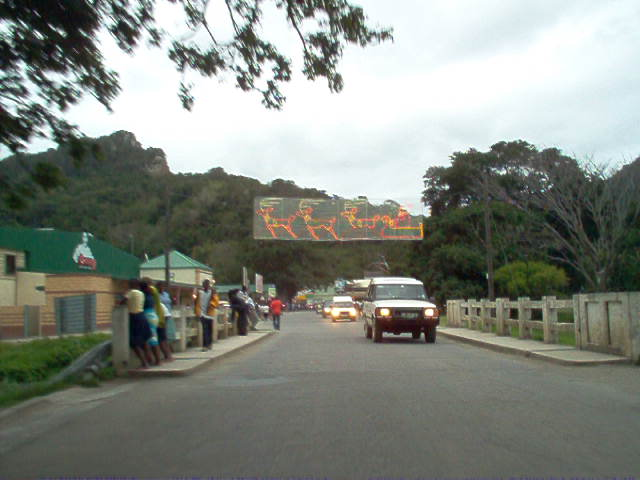
- The town centre

- Location within Eastern Cape Location within South Africa Location within Africa
- Coordinates: 31.6288°S 29.5369°E
- Country: South Africa
- Province: Eastern Cape
- District: O.R. Tambo
- Municipality: Port St Johns

Area
  - Total: 8.03 km^{2} (3.10 sq mi)
- Elevation: 7 m (23 ft)

Population (2011)
  - Total: 6,441
  - Density: 802/km^{2} (2,080/sq mi)

Racial makeup (2011)
  - Black African: 94.7%
  - Coloured: 3.5%
  - Indian/Asian: 0.6%
  - White: 1.1%
  - Other: 0.1%

First languages (2011)
  - Xhosa: 89.7%
  - English: 6.2%
  - Other: 4.1%
- Time zone: UTC+2 (SAST)
- Postal code (street): 5120

Port St. Johns (or Port Saint Johns) is a town of about 6,500 people on the Wild Coast in the Eastern Cape province of South Africa. It is situated at the mouth of the Umzimvubu River, 220 kilometres (140 mi) northeast of East London and 70 kilometres (40 mi) east of Mthatha. Port St. Johns was the birthplace of Capital Radio 604.

== History ==
This town is thought to have been named after a Portuguese ship (the São João), which was actually wrecked at Port Edward. Later seafarers mistakenly identified the mouth of the Umzimvubu River as the site of this wreck.

In the mid-1800s the amaMpondo king, King Ndamase, allowed a few white traders to settle at the mouth of the Umzimvubu River. When King Ndamase died in 1876, the Mpondo Great House in Lusikisiki tried to take over the area. On 17 July 1878, King Ndamase's oldest son Nqwiliso, reacted by ceding the western bank of the Umzimvubu River to the Cape Colony in return for being recognised as an independent ruler and he and his people were promised protection. The river mouth was used as a port, however this activity was abandoned in the 1940s due to siltation, which caused the river to become too shallow for vessels.

The town was the principal port of the Republic of Transkei (1976-1994).

== Geography, climate and geology ==
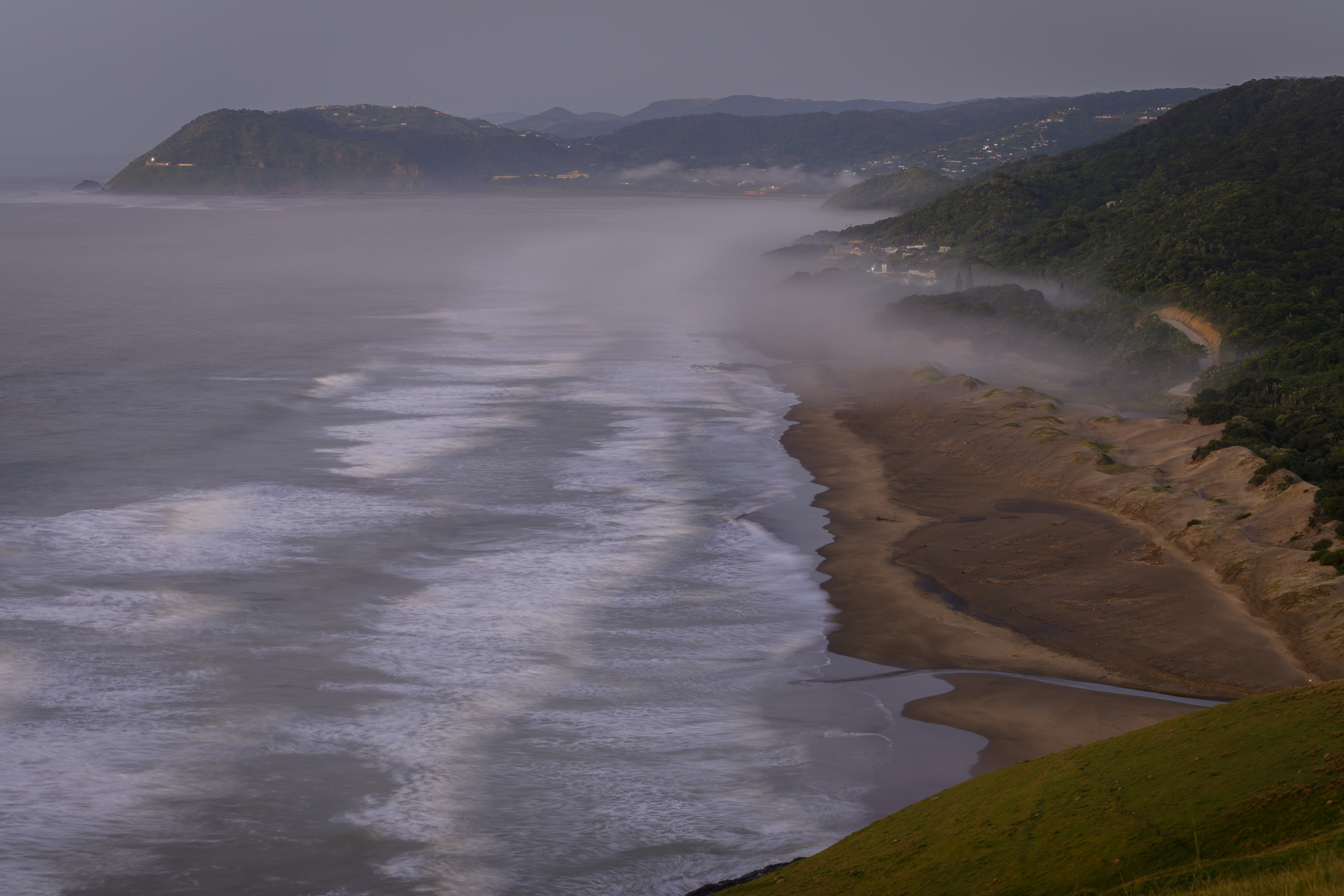
the coastline north of Port St. Johns

Port St. Johns is situated on the Wild Coast on a coastline of about 270 km long. It lies at the mouth of the Mzimvubu River, a river flowing through a gorge known as the "Gates of St John" into an estuary located on the Indian Ocean. On both sides of the river ravine are high sandstone mountain peaks: Mount Thesiger (342 metre above sea level) and Mount Sullivan (304 metre), named after two British Military officers.

It is the main settlement in the Port St. Johns Local Municipality which forms part of the O.R. Tambo District Municipality in Pondoland of the former Transkei. According to the 2011 census it had a population of 6,441, of whom 90% where Xhosa-speaking.

In the area near the town, some of the most significant Travertine deposits in South Africa are found. About 10 km west of Port St. Johns, sandstone is excavated for architectural use.

The climate is humid subtropical (Köppen: Cfa).

Climate data for Port St. Johns
Month	Jan	Feb	Mar	Apr	May	Jun	Jul	Aug	Sep	Oct	Nov	Dec	Year
Record high °C (°F)	31.7 (89.1)	32.8 (91.0)	35.0 (95.0)	34.4 (93.9)	34.4 (93.9)	32.8 (91.0)	33.9 (93.0)	36.5 (97.7)	39.2 (102.6)	41.1 (106.0)	37.7 (99.9)	33.5 (92.3)	41.1 (106.0)
Mean daily maximum °C (°F)	25.1 (77.2)	25.4 (77.7)	24.8 (76.6)	24.0 (75.2)	23.1 (73.6)	22.0 (71.6)	21.4 (70.5)	21.1 (70.0)	21.2 (70.2)	21.7 (71.1)	22.9 (73.2)	24.3 (75.7)	23.1 (73.6)
Daily mean °C (°F)	22.4 (72.3)	22.7 (72.9)	22.0 (71.6)	20.8 (69.4)	19.4 (66.9)	18.0 (64.4)	17.4 (63.3)	17.5 (63.5)	18.1 (64.6)	18.9 (66.0)	20.1 (68.2)	21.4 (70.5)	19.9 (67.8)
Mean daily minimum °C (°F)	19.6 (67.3)	19.9 (67.8)	19.2 (66.6)	17.6 (63.7)	15.7 (60.3)	14.0 (57.2)	13.4 (56.1)	13.9 (57.0)	15.0 (59.0)	16.0 (60.8)	17.3 (63.1)	18.7 (65.7)	16.7 (62.1)
Record low °C (°F)	12.2 (54.0)	11.1 (52.0)	8.2 (46.8)	11.1 (52.0)	8.9 (48.0)	5.6 (42.1)	6.7 (44.1)	6.1 (43.0)	6.7 (44.1)	7.8 (46.0)	7.2 (45.0)	7.9 (46.2)	5.6 (42.1)
Average precipitation mm (inches)	117 (4.6)	130 (5.1)	147 (5.8)	86 (3.4)	66 (2.6)	38 (1.5)	40 (1.6)	49 (1.9)	87 (3.4)	119 (4.7)	120 (4.7)	121 (4.8)	1,120 (44.1)
Average precipitation days (≥ 0.1 mm)	14.3	12.3	11.9	8.6	5.7	3.4	4.6	6.0	9.1	13.5	14.0	14.2	117.6
Average relative humidity (%) (at 14:00)	80	80	81	76	72	65	66	70	75	78	80	79	75
Source: Deutscher Wetterdienst

== Tourism and road access ==
Port St. Johns is known as the centre of tourism on the Wild Coast. It is known for deep sea fishing and shore angling. Near to the town are three beaches.

From Mthatha in the west and Flagstaff in the north the R61 road connects to Port St. Johns. A smaller road leads the last 5 km into town. Port St. Johns has an airstrip on top of Mount Thesiger.

The Pondoland Park is a national park and forested area 500 km^{2} in size, including the Umzimvubu river mouth and stretching north along the coast up to the provincial border with KwaZulu-Natal.

Tours targeting world famous "sardine run" are popular as well.

Port St. Johns
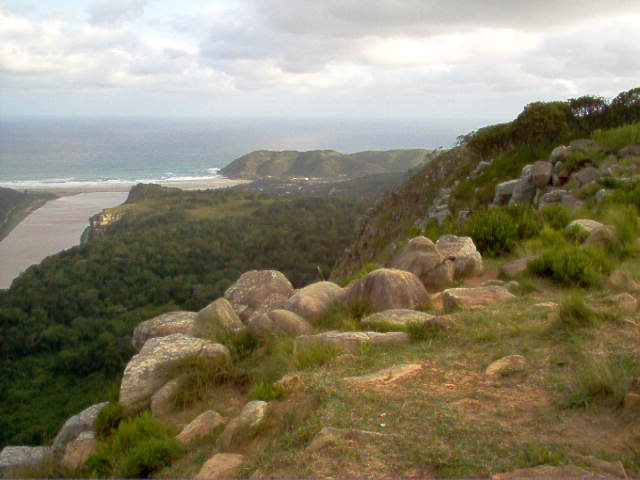
Port St. Johns and the Umzimvubu River mouth from Mount Thesiger

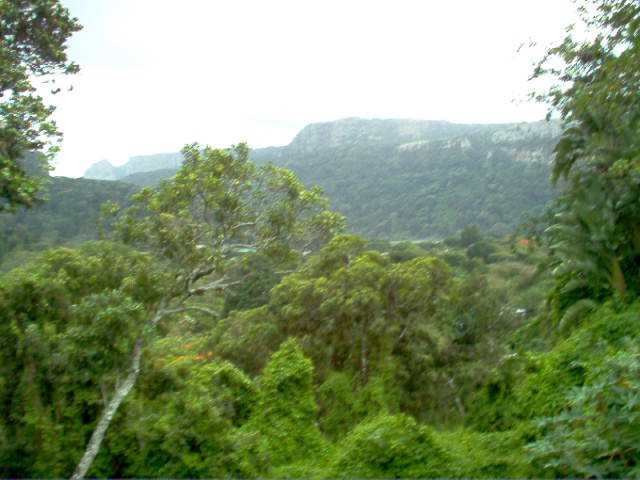
Port St. Johns flora

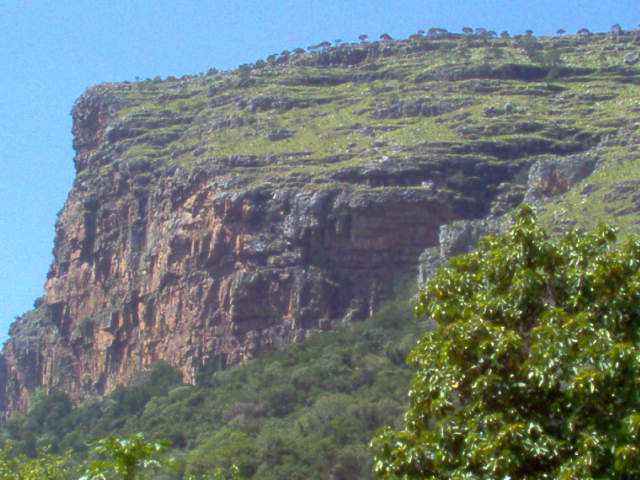
Mount Thesiger

== See also ==
- List of shark attacks in South African territorial waters
