= Masibusane Zongo =

South African soccer player

Personal information
- Full name: Masibusane Kwanga Zongo
- Date of birth: 30 March 1990 (age 36)
- Place of birth: Mthatha, South Africa
- Height: 1.70 m (5 ft 7 in)
- Position: Left winger

Team information
- Current team: Tshakhuma

Youth career
- Bush Bucks
- 2002–2003: University of Pretoria
- 2003–2008: Supersport United

Senior career*
Years	Team	Apps	(Gls)
2008–2012	Supersport United	18	(2)
2010–2011	→ Vasco da Gama (loan)	6	(0)
2012	→ Bidvest Wits (loan)		(1)
2012	Blackburn Rovers		
2013–2015	Chippa United	2	(1)
2015–2016	Platinum Stars	21	(0)
2016–2018	Royal Eagles	4	(0)
2018	Extension Gunners		
2020–	Tshakhuma	3	(0)
- * Club domestic league appearances and goals

Masibusane Zongo (born 30 March 1990 in Mthatha, Eastern Cape) is a South African football (soccer) midfielder who plays for Tshakhuma Tsha Madzivhandila.

He was recalled for a second trial with Tottenham Hotspur, a high profile team in the Premier League. On 1 April 2011 was released from his contract by Vasco da Gama. In November 2011 he returned to Premier Soccer League club Supersport United. On 1 February 2012 he signed for Bidvest Wits.
