= Ntabankulu =

Ntabankulu Tabankulu
- Location within Eastern Cape Location within South Africa
- Coordinates: 30.9584°S 29.3027°E
- Country: South Africa
- Province: Eastern Cape
- District: Alfred Nzo
- Municipality: Ntabankulu

Area
  - Total: 19.51 km^{2} (7.53 sq mi)

Population (2011)
  - Total: 3,266
  - Density: 167.4/km^{2} (433.6/sq mi)

Racial makeup (2011)
  - Black African: 96.7%
  - Coloured: 1.3%
  - Indian/Asian: 0.8%
  - White: 0.1%
  - Other: 1.1%

First languages (2011)
  - Xhosa: 96%
  - English: 2%
  - Other: 2%
- Time zone: UTC+2 (SAST)
- Area code: 039

Ntabankulu, alternatively rendered as Tabankulu, is a town in Alfred Nzo District Municipality in the Eastern Cape province of South Africa. Village some 30 km east-south-east of Mount Frere and 50 km south-south-west of Kokstad.

== History ==
Of Xhosa origin, the name means 'large mountain'. Originating as a general store in 1894 owned by Blenkinsop and Meth while the village was laid out in 1909.

Ntabankulu was a known site for many wars between the Xhosian tribe and the European settlers in the 1700's

== Popularity ==
Ntabankulu is primarily known for Agriculture, Tourism and being near the high mountains in South Africa Ntanbankulu Is also known for having around 95% of their population fluent in the Xhosa language.
