= Flagstaff, South Africa =

Flagstaff Siphaqeni
- Location within Eastern Cape Location within South Africa Location within Africa
- Coordinates: 31°4′48″S 29°30′16″E
- Country: South Africa
- Province: Eastern Cape
- District: O.R. Tambo
- Municipality: Ingquza Hill

Government
  - Type: Ward 6
  - Councillor: M. Didiza

Area
  - Total: 2.7 km^{2} (1.0 sq mi)

Population (2011)
  - Total: 4,821
  - Density: 1,800/km^{2} (4,600/sq mi)

Racial makeup (2011)
  - Black African: 95.7%
  - Coloured: 0.6%
  - Indian/Asian: 1.2%
  - White: 0.3%
  - Other: 2.1%

First languages (2011)
  - IsiXhosa: 89.5%
  - English: 3.2%
  - IsiZulu: 1.1%
  - Other: 6.2%
- Time zone: UTC+2 (SAST)
- Postal code (street): 4810
- PO box: 4810
- Area code: 039

Flagstaff is a town in the OR Tambo District Municipality of the Eastern Cape province of South Africa located some 80 km south-east of Kokstad and 45 km north of Lusikisiki. It is the seat of the Ingquza Hill Local Municipality.

== History ==
The town developed from a trading station established in 1877 and derives its name from the practice by the owners of hoisting a white flag on Sundays to indicate that the store was closed. For many years it served as a post of the Cape Mounted Rifles.

== Education ==
The Flagstaff Primary School at Dlibona village was completed at a cost of R39 million in 2019. It consists of seven classrooms, a nutrition centre, science laboratory, multimedia centre, multipurpose classroom, administration block v8 security room.
