= Kumkani Mhlontlo Local Municipality =

Coordinates: 31°09′S 28°52′E

Kumkani Mhlontlo
- Local municipality
- Seal

- Location in the Eastern Cape
- Country: South Africa
- Province: Eastern Cape
- District: OR Tambo
- Seat: Qumbu
- Wards: 26

Government
  - Type: Municipal council
  - Mayor: Cllr Mbulelo Jara (ANC)
  - Speaker: Cllr Eddie Pula (ANC)
  - Chief Whip: Cllr Ntombikayise Gcaba (ANC)

Area
  - Total: 2,826 km^{2} (1,091 sq mi)

Population (2022)
  - Total: 186,391
  - Density: 65.96/km^{2} (170.8/sq mi)

Racial makeup (2011)
  - Black African: 97.6%
  - Coloured: 0.3%
  - Indian/Asian: 0.2%
  - White: 0.1%

First languages (2011)
  - Xhosa: 94.9%
  - English: 2.3%
  - Other: 2.8%
- Time zone: UTC+2 (SAST)
- Municipal code: EC156

Kumkani Mhlontlo Municipality (formerly Mhlontlo Municipality; Xhosa: uMasipala waseKumkani Mhlontlo) is a local municipality within the OR Tambo District Municipality, in the Eastern Cape province of South Africa.

The Kumkani Mhlontlo Municipality is a municipality situated along the N2 national route between Mthatha and KwaBhaca. It encompasses the towns of Qumbu and Tsolo, together with the surrounding villages. There are three hospitals within the municipality; the Nessie Knight Hospital in Sulenkama village (Qumbu), the St Lucy Hospital in Ngcolosi village (Tsolo) and the Dr Malizo Mpehle Hospital near the town of Tsolo. The municipality is the seat of the AmaMpondomise Kingdom, which seats at Lower Kroza village near Qumbu.

Mhlontlo was a king (Xhosa: Kumkani) of the AmaMpondomise people during the 19th century.

A census was held in 2011, detailing the population and area of the main places in Mhlontlo and their demographics.

== Politics ==
The municipal council consists of fifty-one members elected by mixed-member proportional representation. Twenty-six councillors are elected by first-past-the-post voting in twenty-six wards, while the remaining twenty-five are chosen from party lists so that the total number of party representatives is proportional to the number of votes received. In the election of 1 November 2021 the African National Congress (ANC) won a majority of forty seats on the council. The following table shows the results of the election.

Party	Ward			List			Total seats
Party	Votes	%	Seats	Votes	%	Seats	Total seats
African National Congress	29,816	71.69	25	32,001	77.74	15	40
United Democratic Movement	2,218	5.33	0	2,749	6.68	3	3
Economic Freedom Fighters	2,294	5.52	0	2,491	6.05	3	3
Independent candidates	4,436	10.67	1				1
African Transformation Movement	1,757	4.22	0	1,810	4.40	2	2
Independent South African National Civic Organisation	333	0.80	0	1,253	3.04	1	1
Democratic Alliance	612	1.47	0	609	1.48	1	1
Batho Pele Movement	120	0.29	0	98	0.24	0	0
Civic Independent	2	0.00	0	153	0.37	0	0
Total	41,588	100.00	26	41,164	100.00	25	51
Valid votes	41,588	97.02		41,164	97.06		
Invalid/blank votes	1,276	2.98		1,246	2.94		
Total votes	42,864	100.00		42,410	100.00		
Registered voters/turnout	93,164	46.01		93,164	45.52		

== Nature conservation ==
The Lambasi Nature Reserve, encompassing some 8,810 ha, was proclaimed in 2014 and placed under management of the Lambasi community. The reserve includes the Mzoboshe Horseshoe and parts of the Tsitsa and Tina River valleys which are special features of the Tsitsa Falls Valley. The initiative aimed to supplement income of the community which was dependent on welfare payments, subsistence agriculture and migrant labour.
