= Ntabankulu Local Municipality =

Ntabankulu
- Local municipality
- Seal

- Location in the Eastern Cape
- Coordinates: 32°10′S 28°35′E
- Country: South Africa
- Province: Eastern Cape
- District: Alfred Nzo
- Seat: Tabankulu
- Wards: 18

Government
  - Type: Municipal council
  - Mayor: Priscilla Tsileng Sobuthongo (ANC)
  - Speaker: Vuyokazi Matwasa (ANC)
  - Chief Whip: Sesulo Sophaqa (ANC)

Area
  - Total: 1,385 km^{2} (535 sq mi)

Population (2011)
  - Total: 123,976
  - Density: 89.51/km^{2} (231.8/sq mi)

Racial makeup (2011)
  - Black African: 99.4%
  - Coloured: 0.4%
  - Indian/Asian: 0.1%
  - White: 0.1%

First languages (2011)
  - Xhosa: 95.2%
  - English: 1.4%
  - Other: 3.4%
- Time zone: UTC+2 (SAST)
- Municipal code: EC444

Ntabankulu Municipality (Xhosa: uMasipala wase Ntabankulu) is a local municipality within the Alfred Nzo District Municipality, in the Wild Coast Region of the Eastern Cape province of South Africa. Ntabankulu is an isiXhosa word meaning "great or big mountain", since the municipal area is mountainous in character.

It was formerly part of the OR Tambo District Municipality, but was transferred to the Alfred Nzo District Municipality after the 2011 municipal election.

== Main places ==
The 2011 census for the Ntabankulu Municipality states a population of 123,976 with these most populated main places

Place	Code	Area (km^{2})	Population	Most spoken language
Bhakubha	298039	3.84	2,431	Xhosa
Bhonxa	298061	8.43	3,969	Xhosa
Dambeni	298062	11.52	3,983	Xhosa
Dedelo	298015	12.48	2,957	Xhosa
Matshona	298096	7.41	4,427	Xhosa
Mbongweni	298013	8.86	3,104	Xhosa
Mfundisweni	298037	4.50	2,793	Xhosa
Tabankulu	298077	19.51	3,266	Xhosa
Full Ntabanku 2011 census data	298	1,384.96	123,976	Xhosa

== Politics ==
The municipal council consists of thirty-eight members elected by mixed-member proportional representation. Nineteen councillors are elected by first-past-the-post voting in nineteen wards, while the remaining nineteen are chosen from party lists so that the total number of party representatives is proportional to the number of votes received. In the election of 1 November 2021 the African National Congress (ANC) won a majority of thirty-one seats on the council. The following table shows the results of the election.

Party	Ward			List			Total seats
Party	Votes	%	Seats	Votes	%	Seats	Total seats
African National Congress	25,752	81.48	19	25,540	80.93	12	31
Economic Freedom Fighters	3,483	11.02	0	3,710	11.76	4	4
African Transformation Movement	498	1.58	0	512	1.62	1	1
Democratic Alliance	439	1.39	0	440	1.39	1	1
African Independent Congress	251	0.79	0	499	1.58	1	1
Independent candidates	674	2.13	0				0
United Democratic Movement	271	0.86	0	326	1.03	0	0
God Save Africa	126	0.40	0	194	0.61	0	0
Socialist Party of South Africa	84	0.27	0	143	0.45	0	0
Patriotic Alliance	22	0.07	0	122	0.39	0	0
Independent South African National Civic Organisation	5	0.02	0	71	0.22	0	0
Total	31,605	100.00	19	31,557	100.00	19	38
Valid votes	31,605	97.77		31,557	97.28		
Invalid/blank votes	721	2.23		881	2.72		
Total votes	32,326	100.00		32,438	100.00		
Registered voters/turnout	67,099	48.18		67,099	48.34		
