= Alan Barrow =

South African cricketer (born 1955)

Personal information
- Born: January 23, 1955 (age 71); Umtata, Cape Province
- Batting: Right-handed
- Bowling: Right-arm medium

Career statistics
Competition	First-class	List A
Matches	60	15
Runs scored	2976	775
Batting average	27.30	55.35
100s/50s	2/18	1/6
Top score	111*	202*
Balls bowled	444	36
Wickets	9	1
Bowling average	20.66	24.00
5 wickets in innings	0	0
10 wickets in match	0	0
Best bowling	2/17	1/24
Catches/stumpings	46/–	3/–
- Source: Cricinfo, 15 November 2022

Alan Barrow (born 23 January 1955) is a South African former first class cricketer. He was the second player in List A history to score a double hundred.
