= Alfred Nzo District Municipality =

Alfred Nzo
- District municipality
- Seal

- Location in the Eastern Cape
- Interactive map of Alfred Nzo District Municipality (2026)
- Coordinates: 30°48′S 29°22′E
- Country: South Africa
- Province: Eastern Cape
- Seat: Mount Ayliff
- Local municipalities: List: Matatiele; Umzimvubu; Winnie Madikizela-Mandela; Ntabankulu

Government
  - Type: Municipal council

Area
  - Total: 10,731 km^{2} (4,143 sq mi)

Population (2011)
  - Total: 801,344
  - Density: 74.676/km^{2} (193.41/sq mi)

Racial makeup (2011)
  - Black African: 99.1%
  - Coloured: 0.4%
  - Indian/Asian: 0.1%
  - White: 0.2%

First languages (2011)
  - Xhosa: 84.6%
  - Sotho: 8.8%
  - English: 2.3%
  - Zulu: 1.2%
  - Other: 3.1%
- Time zone: UTC+2 (SAST)
- Municipal code: DC44

The Alfred Nzo District Municipality (Xhosa: uMasipala weSithili sase Alfred Nzo) is one of the 6 districts of the Eastern Cape province of South Africa. The seat is Mount Ayliff. The majority of its 801,344 residents speak isiXhosa. The district code is DC44.

It is named after Alfred Baphethuxolo Nzo, a former secretary-general of the African National Congress and the Minister of Foreign Affairs in Nelson Mandela's cabinet from 1994 to 1999.

== Geography ==
The Alfred Nzo District Municipality contains the following towns: Mount Frere, Mount Ayliff, Maloti, Matatiele, Bizana and Tabankulu. It is the smallest and one of the poorest districts in the province.

=== Neighbours ===
Alfred Nzo is surrounded by:

- The kingdom of Lesotho to the north
- Harry Gwala District (DC43) to the north-east
- Ugu District (DC21) to the east
- OR Tambo District (DC15) to the south
- Joe Gqabi District (DC14) to the west

=== Local municipalities ===
The district contains the following local municipalities:

Local municipality	Population	%
Matatiele	203,843	25.44%
Ntabankulu	123,976	15.47%
Umzimvubu	191,620	23.91%
Winnie Madikizela-Mandela	281,905	35.18%

After the 2011 municipal election, Alfred Nzo District was expanded by including Mbizana Local Municipality and Ntabankulu Local Municipality, previously part of OR Tambo District Municipality.

The district is a focus area for the Umzimvubu Catchment Partnership Programme, in which Conservation South Africa participates as part of catchment-restoration work including invasive alien plant clearing and grazing-land restoration.

== Demographics ==
The following statistics are from the 2011 census.

=== Languages ===
Language	Population	%
Xhosa	673,519	84.58%
Sotho	69,811	8.77%
English	18,090	2.27%
Zulu	9,954	1.25%
Sign language	7,189	0.90%
Afrikaans	6,716	0.84%
Other	4,595	0.58%
Northern Sotho	2,275	0.29%
Ndebele	2,043	0.26%
Tswana	1,360	0.17%
Venda	358	0.04%
Tsonga	231	0.03%
Swati	187	0.02%

=== Gender ===
Gender	Population	%
Female	434,857	54.27%
Male	366,488	45.73%

=== Ethnic group ===
Ethnic group	Population	%
Black African	794,382	99.13%
Coloured	3,307	0.41%
White	1,898	0.24%
Indian/Asian	1,132	0.14%
Other	624	0.08%

=== Age ===
Age	Population	%
000–004	68,152	12.38%
005–009	85,022	15.45%
010–014	89,083	16.19%
015–019	73,875	13.42%
020–024	41,503	7.54%
025–029	28,489	5.18%
030–034	23,459	4.26%
035–039	23,401	4.25%
040–044	21,729	3.95%
045–049	18,478	3.36%
050–054	15,872	2.88%
055–059	13,475	2.45%
060–064	13,398	2.43%
065–069	13,266	2.41%
070–074	9,980	1.81%
075–079	5,540	1.01%
080–084	4,009	0.73%
085–089	1,008	30.0%
090–094	420	0.08%
095–099	195	0.04%
100 plus	38	0.01%

== Politics ==
=== Election results ===
Election results for Alfred Nzo in the South African general election, 2004.

- Population 18 and over: 260 501 [70% of total population]
- Total votes: 172 001 [31.25% of total population]
- Voting % estimate: 66.03% votes as a % of population 18 and over

Party	Votes	%
African National Congress	151,605	88.14%
United Democratic Movement	14,449	8.40%
Inkhata Freedom Party	1,803	1.05%
Pan African Congress	802	0.47%
African Christian Democratic Party	683	0.40%
Democratic Alliance	533	0.31%
SOPA	340	0.20%
Azanian People's Organisation	258	0.15%
New National Party	201	0.12%
United Christian Democratic Party	200	0.12%
EMSA	191	0.11%
Freedom Front Plus	190	0.11%
PJC	129	0.07%
NA	125	0.07%
UF	103	0.06%
TOP	98	0.06%
Independent Democrats	93	0.05%
CDP	65	0.04%
KISS	48	0.03%
Minority Front	48	0.03%
NLP	37	0.02%
Total	172,001	100.00%
