= Mhlanga =

Mhlanga is a Zimbabwean surname. Notable people with the surname include:

- Cont Mhlanga, a Zimbabwean playwright, actor, and theatre director
- Jennifer Mhlanga, a Zimbabwean politician
- Khahisa Mhlanga, a British cross country and middle-distance runner
- Lawrence Mhlanga, a Zimbabwean footballer
- Louis Mhlanga, a Zimbabwean artist based in South Africa
- Vincent Mhlanga, a Swazi politician
