= Ingquza Hill Local Municipality =

Ingquza Hill
- Local municipality
- Seal

- Location in the Eastern Cape
- Coordinates: 32°10′S 28°35′E
- Country: South Africa
- Province: Eastern Cape
- District: OR Tambo
- Seat: Flagstaff
- Wards: 31

Government
  - Type: Municipal council
  - Mayor: BB Goya (ANC)
  - Speaker: Ntandokazi Yolisa Chapa (ANC)
  - Chief Whip: Mbongeni Isaac Nkungu (ANC)

Area
  - Total: 2,477 km^{2} (956 sq mi)

Population (2011)
  - Total: 278,481
  - Density: 112.4/km^{2} (291.2/sq mi)

Racial makeup (2011)
  - Black African: 99.2%
  - Coloured: 0.4%
  - Indian/Asian: 0.1%
  - White: 0.1%

First languages (2011)
  - Xhosa: 94.6%
  - English: 2.2%
  - Other: 3.2%
- Time zone: UTC+2 (SAST)
- Municipal code: EC153

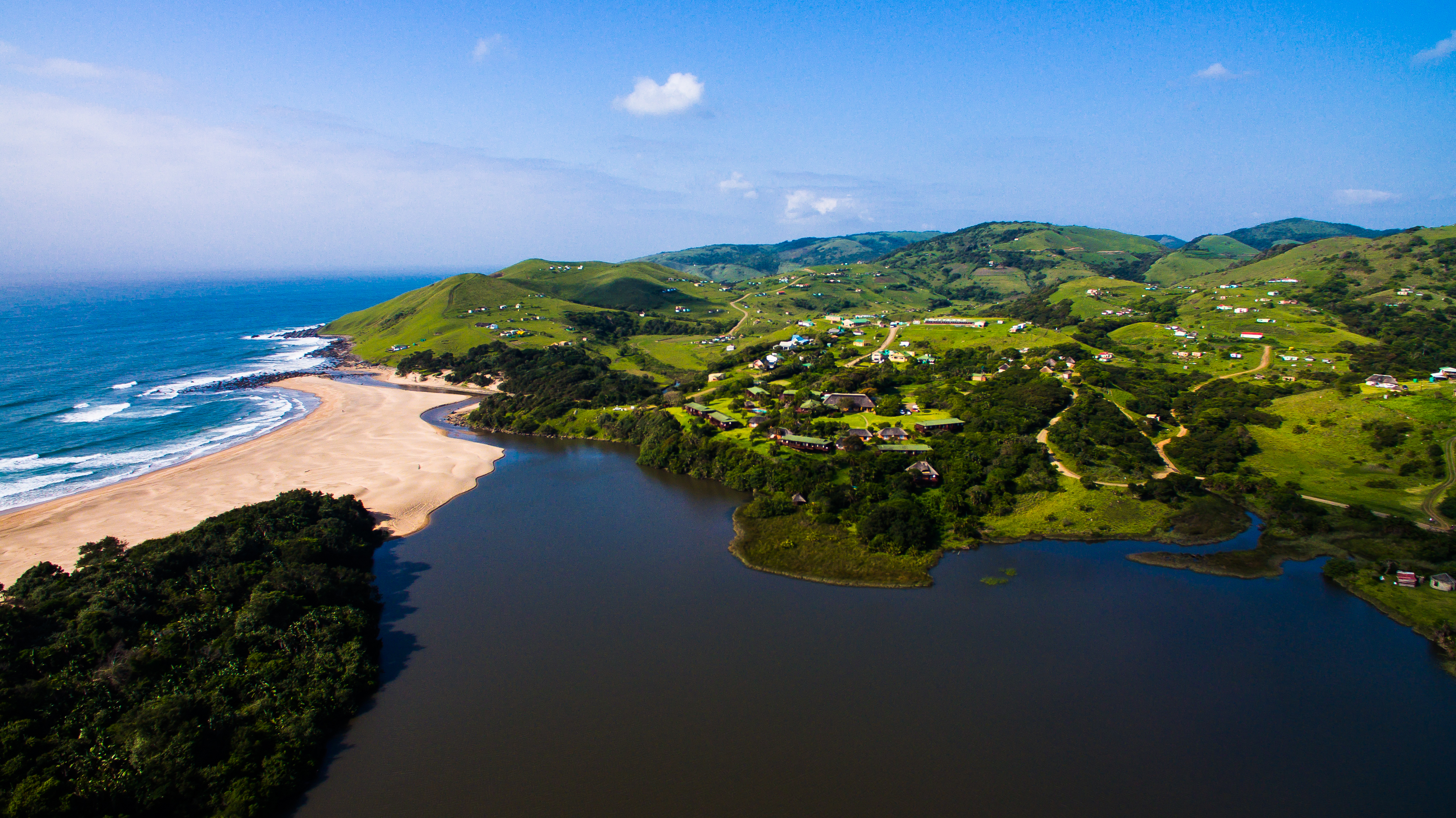
An aerial view of Mboyti, a small settlement and coastal resort located in the Ingquza Hill Local Municipality close to the town of Lusikisiki on the mouth of the Mboyti River.

Ingquza Hill Municipality (Xhosa: uMasipala wase Ingquza Hill), previously known as Qaukeni Municipality, is a local municipality within the OR Tambo District Municipality, in the Eastern Cape province of South Africa.

== Main places ==
The 2001 census divided the municipality into the following main places:

Place	Code	Area (km^{2})	Population
Amakwalo	23201	123.86	8,467
Amanci	23202	5.21	706
Amantlane	23203	117.16	12,588
Awahlwazi	23204	25.03	4,082
Bala	23205	134.39	15,995
Emtweni	23206	53.32	2,023
Flagstaff	23207	13.77	3,069
Gunyeni	23208	45.12	13,493
Lusikisiki	23209	21.04	9,079
Lwandlolubomvu	23210	1.24	78
Mkambati	23211	173.29	800
Mtshayelo	23212	14.63	1,980
Mxobo	23213	86.08	9,632
Ndimakude	23214	16.10	1,765
Sipaqeni	23216	249.31	34,069
Taweni	23217	342.85	35,362
Xopozo	23218	79.49	7,835
Remainder of the municipality	23215	958.25	94,357

== Politics ==
The municipal council consists of sixty-four members elected by mixed-member proportional representation. Thirty-two councillors are elected by first-past-the-post voting in thirty-two wards, while the remaining thirty-two are chosen from party lists so that the total number of party representatives is proportional to the number of votes received. In the election of 1 November 2021 the African National Congress (ANC) won a majority of forty-six seats on the council. The following table shows the results of the election.

Party	Ward			List			Total seats
Party	Votes	%	Seats	Votes	%	Seats	Total seats
African National Congress	41,478	67.23	28	44,529	75.84	18	46
Economic Freedom Fighters	5,156	8.36	0	5,530	9.42	6	6
Independent candidates	7,658	12.41	4				4
Civic Independent	1,771	2.87	0	2,068	3.52	2	2
Democratic Alliance	1,814	2.94	0	1,513	2.58	2	2
African Transformation Movement	1,211	1.96	0	1,369	2.33	1	1
United Democratic Movement	1,062	1.72	0	1,184	2.02	1	1
African Independent Congress	382	0.62	0	972	1.66	1	1
African People's Convention	486	0.79	0	411	0.70	1	1
Congress of the People	292	0.47	0	392	0.67	0	0
Pan Africanist Congress of Azania	184	0.30	0	244	0.42	0	0
African Christian Democratic Party	193	0.31	0	185	0.32	0	0
Inkatha Freedom Party	6	0.01	0	321	0.55	0	0
Total	61,693	100.00	32	58,718	100.00	32	64
Valid votes	61,693	97.50		58,718	94.55		
Invalid/blank votes	1,581	2.50		3,383	5.45		
Total votes	63,274	100.00		62,101	100.00		
Registered voters/turnout	139,517	45.35		139,517	44.51		
