= Mount Frere =

Mount Frere KwaBhaca
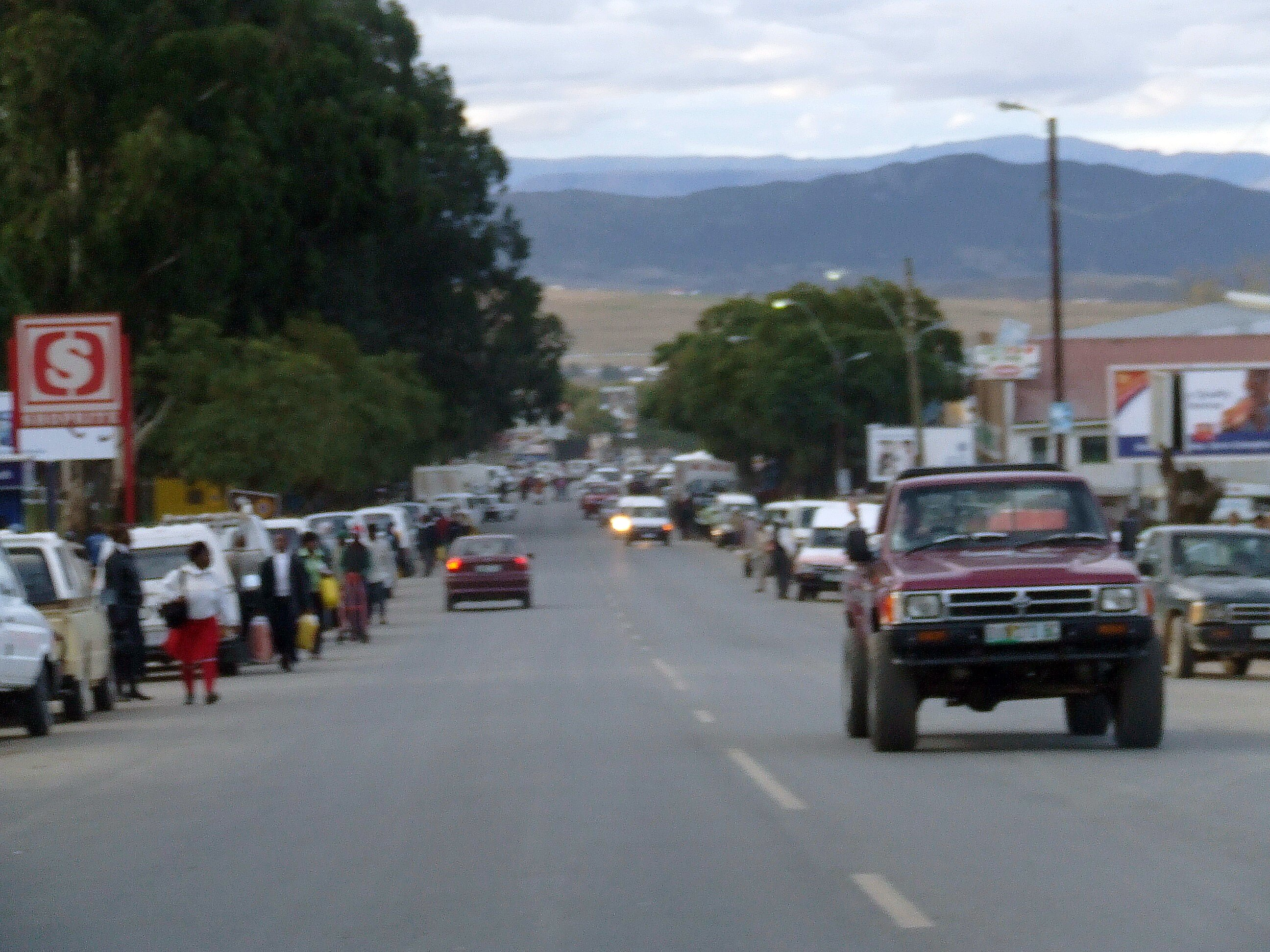
- Main street of Mount Frere

- Location within Eastern Cape Location within South Africa
- Coordinates: 30°55′S 28°59′E
- Country: South Africa
- Province: Eastern Cape
- District: Alfred Nzo
- Municipality: Umzimvubu
- Established: 1876
  - Councillor: (ANC)

Area
  - Total: 3.53 km^{2} (1.36 sq mi)

Population (2011)
  - Total: 5,252
  - Density: 1,490/km^{2} (3,850/sq mi)

Racial makeup (2011)
  - Black African: 96.1%
  - Coloured: 1.2%
  - Indian/Asian: 0.8%
  - White: 0.8%
  - Other: 1.1%

First languages (2011)
  - isiBhaca: 86.6%
  - English: 6.0%
  - Hlubi: 1.8%
  - Other: 5.7%
- Time zone: UTC+2 (SAST)
- Postal code (street): 5090
- PO box: 5090
- Area code: 039 255

Mount Frere, officially KwaBhaca, is a town located in the Eastern Cape province, previously known as the Transkei region, of South Africa. KwaBhaca is situated between Kokstad and Mthatha along the N2 road about 100 km north east of Mthatha. It is administered by the Umzimvubu Municipality and the villages are ruled by the Tribal chief with intermediary borders.

== History ==
Its name in isiNguni is KwaBhaca, or "village of the Bhaca chiefdom", or "place of the Bhaca people", who settled here around the year 1825.

Mount Frere was founded in 1876 and named after Sir Henry Bartle Edward Frere. In February 2016, Mount Frere was renamed KwaBhaca.
