= Umzimvubu Local Municipality =

Umzimvubu
- Local municipality
- Seal

- Location in the Eastern Cape
- Coordinates: 32°10′S 28°35′E
- Country: South Africa
- Province: Eastern Cape
- District: Alfred Nzo
- Seat: Mount Frere
- Wards: 27

Government
  - Type: Municipal council
  - Mayor: Sobane Mnukwa (ANC)
  - Speaker: Nofikile Florida Ngonyolo (ANC)
  - Chief Whip: Ndanele Mzinwa (ANC)

Area
  - Total: 2,577 km^{2} (995 sq mi)

Population (2011)
  - Total: 191,620
  - Density: 74.36/km^{2} (192.6/sq mi)

Racial makeup (2011)
  - Black African: 99.4%
  - Coloured: 0.3%
  - Indian/Asian: 0.1%
  - White: 0.1%

First languages (2011)
  - Xhosa: 93.1%
  - English: 2.6%
  - Other: 4.3%
- Time zone: UTC+2 (SAST)
- Municipal code: EC442

Umzimvubu Municipality (Xhosa: uMasipala wase Umzimvubu) is a local municipality within the Alfred Nzo District Municipality, in the Eastern Cape province of South Africa. Umzimvubu, the name of the Mzimvubu River, is an isiXhosa word meaning "home of the hippopotamus". The municipal area comprises an area of 2506 square kilometres. The municipality has undergone a number of amendments in terms of municipal and ward demarcation which has a profound impact on planning in the area.

== Main places ==
The 2001 census divided the municipality into the following main places:

Place	Code	Area (km^{2})	Population	Most spoken language
Amahlubi	23801	92.17	2,814	Xhosa
Bakoena	23802	528.40	31,417	Sotho
Bhele	23803	2.66	540	Xhosa
Fikeni	23804	142.30	15,767	Xhosa
Hlubi	23805	52.81	4,233	Xhosa
Ludidi	23806	281.33	13,846	Xhosa
Lupindo	23807	187.89	12,034	Xhosa
Lwandlolubomvu	23808	3.76	787	Xhosa
Makaula	23809	1,488.73	100,632	Xhosa
Malubelube	23810	68.68	21,730	Xhosa
Mandileni	296083; 296101; 296102; 296149	11.70	2,267	Xhosa
Manguzela	23812	117.54	12,044	Xhosa
Matandela	23813	98.75	4,985	Xhosa
Maxesibeni	23814	97.92	5,512	Xhosa
Mosesh	23815	474.54	35,501	Sotho
Mount Ayliff	23816	19.52	4,881	Xhosa
Mount Frere	23817	14.74	7,655	Xhosa
Mpoza	23818	210.04	11,604	Xhosa
Mzongwana	23819	244.84	13,100	Xhosa
Sibi	23820	326.42	30,275	Xhosa
Umzimvubu Part 1	23821	55.55	2,268	Xhosa
Umzimvubu Part 2	23825	162.00	721	Xhosa
Xesibe	23822	385.59	41,825	Xhosa

== Politics ==
The municipal council consists of fifty-five members elected by mixed-member proportional representation. Twenty-eight councillors are elected by first-past-the-post voting in twenty-eight wards, while the remaining twenty-seven are chosen from party lists so that the total number of party representatives is proportional to the number of votes received. In the election of 1 November 2021 the African National Congress (ANC) won a majority of forty-two seats on the council. The following table shows the results of the election.

Party	Ward			List			Total seats
Party	Votes	%	Seats	Votes	%	Seats	Total seats
African National Congress	38,169	77.60	28	37,352	76.09	14	42
Economic Freedom Fighters	4,884	9.93	0	4,955	10.09	6	6
Democratic Alliance	2,042	4.15	0	2,018	4.11	2	2
African Transformation Movement	1,352	2.75	0	1,370	2.79	2	2
United Democratic Movement	1,264	2.57	0	1,310	2.67	2	2
African Independent Congress	585	1.19	0	1,448	2.95	1	1
Socialist Revolutionary Workers Party	330	0.67	0	208	0.42	0	0
Independent candidates	379	0.77	0				0
Socialist Party of South Africa	99	0.20	0	241	0.49	0	0
Independent South African National Civic Organisation	86	0.17	0	188	0.38	0	0
Total	49,190	100.00	28	49,090	100.00	27	55
Valid votes	49,190	97.93		49,090	97.79		
Invalid/blank votes	1,042	2.07		1,111	2.21		
Total votes	50,232	100.00		50,201	100.00		
Registered voters/turnout	106,760	47.05		106,760	47.02		
