= Nyandeni Local Municipality =

Nyandeni
- Local municipality
- Seal

- Location in the Eastern Cape
- Coordinates: 31°27′S 28°57′E
- Country: South Africa
- Province: Eastern Cape
- District: OR Tambo
- Seat: Libode
- Wards: 31

Government
  - Type: Municipal council
  - Mayor: Mesuli Ngqodwana (ANC)
  - Speaker: Noziphiwo Matanda (ANC)
  - Chief Whip: Mcebisi Robert Mtobela (ANC)

Area
  - Total: 2,474 km^{2} (955 sq mi)

Population (2011)
  - Total: 290,390
  - Density: 117.4/km^{2} (304.0/sq mi)

Racial makeup (2011)
  - Black African: 99.4%
  - Coloured: 0.3%
  - Indian/Asian: 0.1%
  - White: 0.1%

First languages (2011)
  - Xhosa: 95.3%
  - English: 2.0%
  - Other: 2.7%
- Time zone: UTC+2 (SAST)
- Municipal code: EC155

Nyandeni Municipality (Xhosa: uMasipala wase Nyandeni) is a local municipality within the OR Tambo District Municipality, in the Eastern Cape province of South Africa. Its administrative seat is the town of Libode. The entire municipal area falls within the former Transkei Bantustan area. The urban population is mainly located in the two small towns of Libode and Ngqeleni.

Scattered, low-density rural settlements dominate the municipality. 79% of households reside in traditional or village type settlements. These settlements are loosely scattered throughout the entire municipal area and are surrounded by communal grazing and arable lands. The majority of residential structures are self-built. Apart from a few trading stores, there is little sign of any significant economic activity within the rural settlements. Many of the families in the rural regions of the municipality were formerly supported by men who worked as migrant labour in local mines. Subsequent retrenchment at the mines has left these communities with scant means to survive. About 77% of households can be regarded as indigents with access to either no income or incomes of less than R800 (US$108) per month.

Most of the education institutions in Nyandeni cater to lower level schooling. Of the 426 schools in the Nyandeni area, 64% are overcrowded or highly overcrowded, according to the OR Tambo District office. The spread of HIV/AIDS is an extremely severe and urgent problem in the area. In 2009, the HIV/AIDS prevalence rate was as high as 50%-60% among tested cases; these cases were mainly females who participated in voluntary testing during their regular pregnancy visits to local clinics.

== Main places ==
The 2001 census divided the municipality into the following main places:

Place	Code	Area (km^{2})	Population
Amasane	23401	26.59	3,244
Gibisela	23402	103.10	13,723
Konjywayo	23403	380.45	39,367
Libode	23404	33.68	3,835
Masizakhe	23405	6.71	579
Mbalisweni	23406	121.53	6,333
Mcwebeni	23407	159.79	16,614
Mhlanga	23408	709.67	81,298
Ndluzula	23409	2.51	578
Ngqeleni	23410	15.17	2,062
Ngqubusini	23411	292.53	41,001
Ngxangule	23412	105.59	9,131
Nqabe	23413	17.07	2,388
Ntakatye	23414	310.72	36,078
Qokolweni/Zimbane	23415	4.38	0
Simanzi	23416	309.37	24,566
Tshomane	23417	7.03	0
Xesibe	23418	4.85	464

== Politics ==
The municipal council consists of sixty-four members elected by mixed-member proportional representation. Thirty-two councillors are elected by first-past-the-post voting in thirty-two wards, while the remaining thirty-two are chosen from party lists so that the total number of party representatives is proportional to the number of votes received. In the election of 1 November 2021 the African National Congress (ANC) won a majority of fifty-one seats on the council. The following table shows the results of the election.

Party	Ward			List			Total seats
Party	Votes	%	Seats	Votes	%	Seats	Total seats
African National Congress	43,442	77.94	32	44,398	79.64	19	51
African Transformation Movement	4,431	7.95	0	4,226	7.58	5	5
Economic Freedom Fighters	2,920	5.24	0	2,852	5.12	4	4
United Democratic Movement	875	1.57	0	1,910	3.43	2	2
Independent candidates	1,985	3.56	0				0
Democratic Alliance	913	1.64	0	832	1.49	1	1
Civic Independent	579	1.04	0	613	1.10	1	1
Pan Africanist Congress of Azania	209	0.37	0	396	0.71	0	0
Independent South African National Civic Organisation	157	0.28	0	257	0.46	0	0
Batho Pele Movement	176	0.32	0	154	0.28	0	0
Congress of the People	54	0.10	0	111	0.20	0	0
Total	55,741	100.00	32	55,749	100.00	32	64
Valid votes	55,741	97.86		55,749	97.90		
Invalid/blank votes	1,219	2.14		1,195	2.10		
Total votes	56,960	100.00		56,944	100.00		
Registered voters/turnout	134,601	42.32		134,601	42.31		
