= Mthatha =

Mthatha Umtata
- City
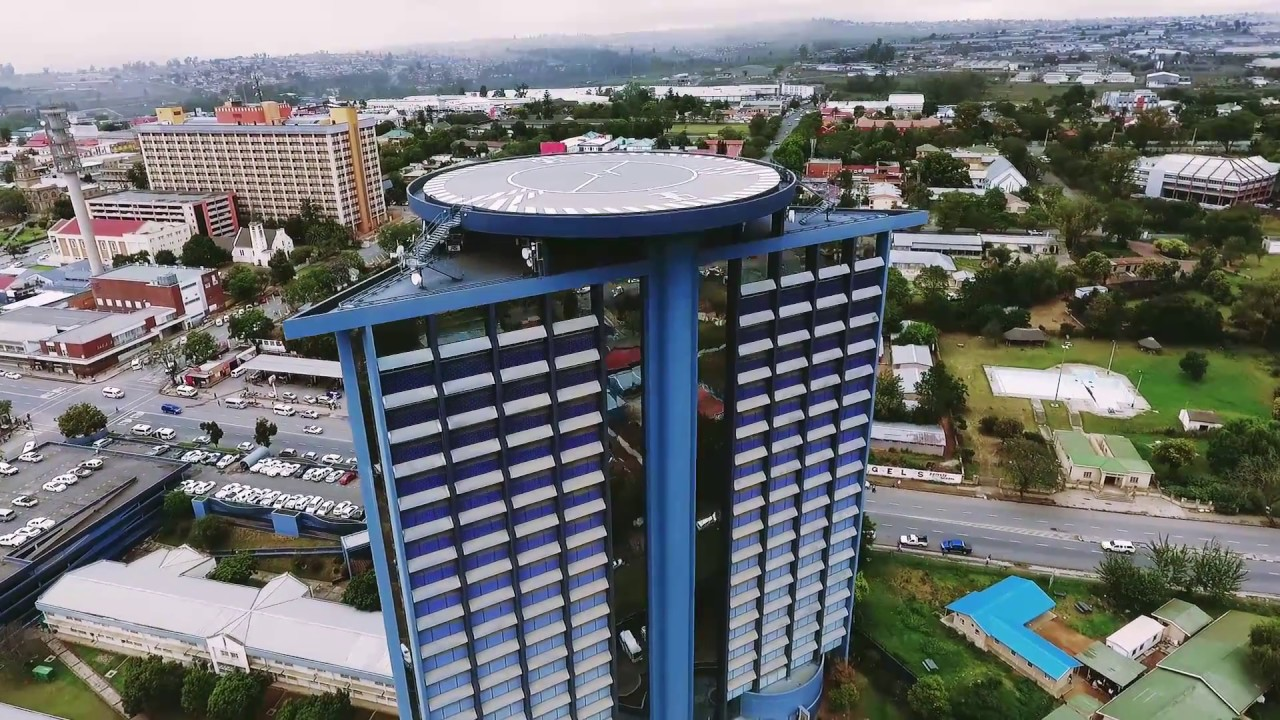
- Mthatha Central Business District

- Location within Eastern Cape Location within South Africa Location within Africa
- Coordinates: 31°35′19″S 28°47′24″E
- Country: South Africa
- Province: Eastern Cape
- District: O.R. Tambo
- Municipality: King Sabata Dalindyebo

Area
  - Total: 91.45 km^{2} (35.31 sq mi)
- Elevation: 698 m (2,290 ft)

Population (2011)
  - Total: 96,114
  - Density: 1,051/km^{2} (2,722/sq mi)

Racial makeup (2011)
  - Black African: 94.6%
  - Coloured: 2.7%
  - Indian/Asian: 1.2%
  - White: 1.0%
  - Other: 0.5%

First languages (2011)
  - Xhosa: 85.0%
  - English: 8.6%
  - Afrikaans: 1.1%
  - Other: 5.2%
- Time zone: UTC+2 (SAST)
- Postal code (street and PO box): 5099
- Area code: 047

Mthatha (/əmˈtɑːtɑː/ əm-TAH-tah, Xhosa: [ḿ̩ˈtʰâːtʰà]), alternatively rendered Umtata, is the main city of the King Sabata Dalindyebo Local Municipality in Eastern Cape province of South Africa and the capital of OR Tambo District Municipality. The city has an airport, previously known as the K. D. Matanzima Airport after former leader Kaiser Matanzima. Mthatha derives its name from the nearby Mthatha River which was named after the sneezewood (umtati) trees, famous for their wood and medicinal properties.

== History ==
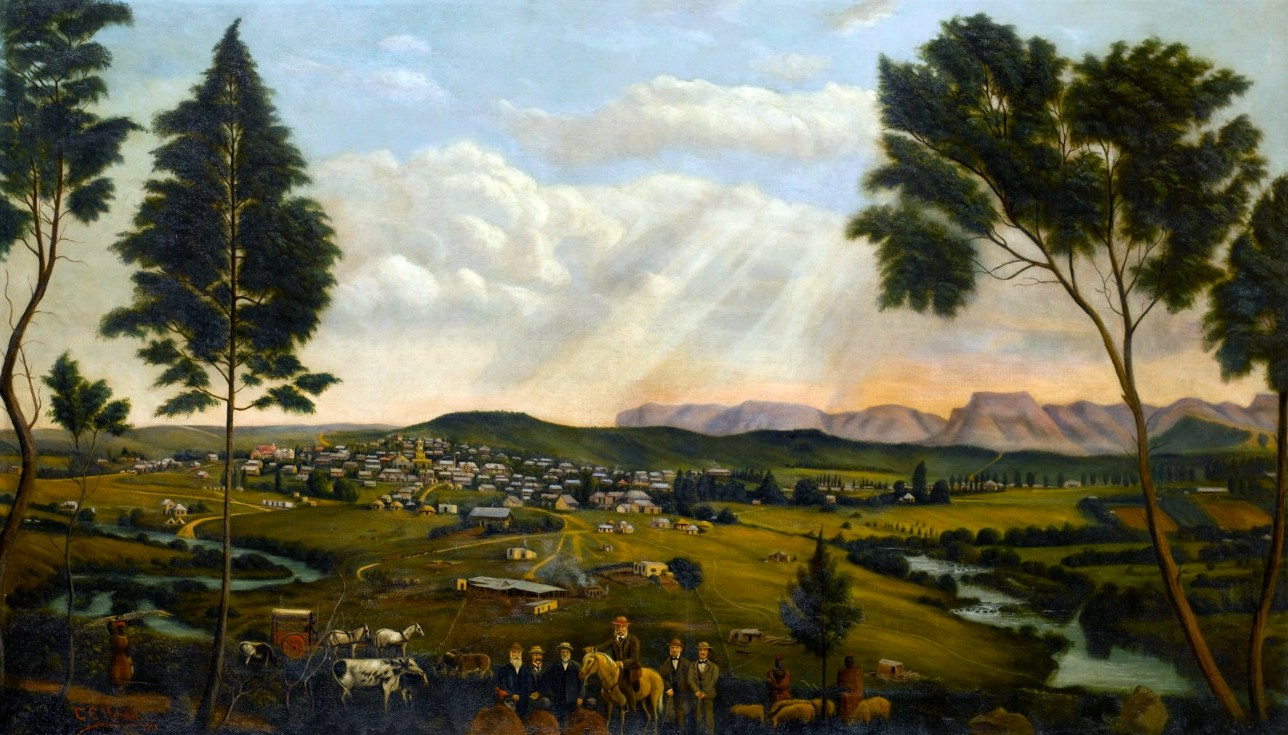
1913 panoramic view of Mthatha with the Mthatha River in the foreground and the Drakensberg mountains in the distance by Caesar Carl Hans Henkel

The settlement existed in the 1870s as a buffer-zone, in response to reported tensions between Mpondo and neighbouring Thembu groups, and in 1875 a magistrate's office was opened. The first magistrate, appointed that year, was a man named J F Boyes. The settlement developed during the next few years, becoming a military post for the British colonial forces in 1882. The town itself was founded in 1883, along the banks of the Mthatha River. Nearly a century later, the Mthatha Dam was constructed about eight kilometers upstream of the town. Mthatha became the leading administrative centre of the area, having both Anglican and Catholic cathedrals. The town became the headquarters of the Transkeian Territories General Council (known as the Bunga), and the building which served as a parliament was erected in 1903. This was followed by the construction of the town hall in 1908. A branch of the University of Fort Hare was established in the town, and after the independence of the Transkei in 1977 it became the University of Transkei. In 2005, the University of Transkei with the Border Technikon and Eastern Cape Technikon were merged to form the Walter Sisulu University for Technology and Science. The campus was the base for the region's first community radio station, UCRFM, which started in 1996 and has become a significant community broadcaster.

On 1 August 1973, Mthatha High Court was opened.

In 1973, a summit meeting of the black homeland leaders was held at Umtata, when they decided to federate their respective states after independence. In 1976, Transkei was granted independence as a bantustan, a nominally independent state not recognised outside South Africa. Mthatha served as the capital under the name "Umtata". Under the Transkei regime, an airport named after the then ruler of Transkei KD Matanzima was built. On 21 May 2012, the airport was formally handed over to Lindiwe Sisulu, then Minister of Defence, by Noxolo Kiviet, then Premier of the Eastern Cape. However, the South African National Defence Force relinquished its control of the airport in 2013. The airport was renamed Mthatha Airport.

Many of South Africa's black leaders – including Walter Sisulu, Sabelo Phama, Bantu Holomisa and Nelson Mandela — come from this area, and Nelson Rholihlahla Mandela lived out his retirement in his home village of Qunu, a few kilometres south of Mthatha. Mthatha is a focal point of the Nelson Mandela Route which celebrates the life of Nelson Mandela. There are three Nelson Mandela Museums. Spread across three sites, they collect, interpret and exhibit key aspects of the story of the life and times of Nelson Mandela. The three historical sites of the museum are at Mvezo, Qunu and the Bunga Building in Mthatha. In the Bunga Building is the story of the Long Walk to Freedom and an exhibition of the many gifts received by Nelson Mandela.

On 2 March 2004, Umtata was renamed "Mthatha".

== Business ==
Mthatha has 2 major taxi businesses: Uncedo Taxi Association and Border Taxi Association. These associations had a feud over the R61 road from Mthatha to Libode and Port St. Johns. This feud resulted in taxi ranks being closed by the Government. Over 60 fatalities were reported during the period of the feud. In 2018, the Minister of Police Bheki Cele closed all taxi ranks in Mthatha and demanded that the taxi associations negotiate with the police and merge to form one association but they refused. As a result, some taxis were impounded by the police. Sagas ranks were opened in Mthatha but the ranks that were not opened triggered riots with people protesting and police firing rubber bullets and tear gas affecting a nearby school (St John's College).

In 2019, two final year students, from the Walter Sisulu University developed affordable prosthetics. These students, Siphosethu Mgwili and Zanodumo Godlimpi, were awarded the first ever WSU vice-chancellor's award for most innovative prototype.

== Religion ==
The city is the episcopal see of both the Roman Catholic Diocese of Mthatha and the Anglican Diocese of Mthatha.

== Economy ==
Mthatha falls under OR Tambo District Municipality which is the poorest district in the Eastern Cape by all poverty measures. It has the lowest HDI (0.45) and the highest poverty gap (2.231 million) in the Eastern Cape. The number of people living in poverty is also high in this district (64.6%), unemployment is at 65.5% and the literacy rate 42.2%.

In 2006, it was reported the King Sabata Dalindyebo Local Municipality was owed R250 million by residents in unpaid service fees. It counts among its creditors the South African Revenue Service (to which it owes R18 million), the Public Investment Commission (R84 million), the national water affairs and forestry department (R46 million) and the Development Bank of Southern Africa (R13 million). According to SA Delivery, The average annual income of a black Mthatha resident is R15,762. The town has also been plagued by complaints about the state of its roads and the collapse of its utilities and infrastructure. It's widely reported that the general decline into dysfunction and societal fragility is caused by endemic political corruption, municipal incompetence and widespread criminality. Despite all that, there is construction of infrastructure like BT Ngebs Mall and Mayfair Hotel.

The Sinawe Thuthuzela Care Centre, a rape crisis centre launched in 2001, sees between 60 and 120 patients a month, from up to 200 km (120 mi) away. It won an award for being "the best-run care centre in South Africa". Sinawe means "we are with you" in Xhosa.

== Notable people ==
- Nelson Mandela, global statesman and philanthropist
- Black Coffee, international DJ
- Nambitha Mpumlwana, actress
- Busiswa, musician and dancer
- Jet Novuka, actor
- Zikhona Sodlaka, actress
- Stella Ndabeni-Abrahams, politician
- King Buyelekhaya Dalindyebo "Aa! Zwelibanzi!", the King of the AbaThembu Kingdom
- King Sabata Dalindyebo "Aa! Jonguhlanga!", the King of the AbaThembu Kingdom
- Moneoa Moshesh
- Noeleen Maholwana-Sangqu
- Amanda Black
- Lwazi Mvovo
- Odwa Ndungane
- Akona Ndungane
- Alan Barrow
- Bongani Mayosi
- Nkosinathi Mankayi
- Bubele Mhlana
- Carlo Del Fava
- Jeff Hawkes
- Jessica Haines
- Simphiwe Dana
- Masibusane Zongo
- Ngazibini Sigwili
- Odwa Ndungane
- Sean Park
- Siya Mdaka
- Vusumuzi Masondo
- Sabelo Phama
- Zola Nombona
- Athi-Patra Ruga
- Kaneez Surka
- Jerry Masslo
- Wendy Woods
- Liminathi Ntlanganiso

== Climate ==
Climate data for Mthatha
Month	Jan	Feb	Mar	Apr	May	Jun	Jul	Aug	Sep	Oct	Nov	Dec	Year
Record high °C (°F)	42 (108)	40 (104)	40 (104)	36 (97)	34 (93)	30 (86)	30 (86)	33 (91)	44 (111)	38 (100)	41 (106)	41 (106)	44 (111)
Mean daily maximum °C (°F)	27 (81)	27 (81)	26 (79)	25 (77)	23 (73)	21 (70)	21 (70)	22 (72)	23 (73)	23 (73)	25 (77)	27 (81)	24 (75)
Mean daily minimum °C (°F)	16 (61)	16 (61)	15 (59)	12 (54)	8 (46)	4 (39)	4 (39)	7 (45)	9 (48)	11 (52)	13 (55)	15 (59)	11 (52)
Record low °C (°F)	9 (48)	9 (48)	7 (45)	1 (34)	−1 (30)	−3 (27)	−3 (27)	−1 (30)	1 (34)	2 (36)	4 (39)	7 (45)	−3 (27)
Average rainfall mm (inches)	87 (3.4)	89 (3.5)	83 (3.3)	58 (2.3)	18 (0.7)	11 (0.4)	18 (0.7)	15 (0.6)	35 (1.4)	73 (2.9)	75 (3.0)	88 (3.5)	650 (25.6)
Average rainy days (≥ 1 mm)	15	14	13	8	5	3	3	5	8	13	13	14	113
Source: South African Weather Service, 1961-1990

Mthatha has a warm oceanic climate (Köppen Cfb) closely bordering on both a humid subtropical climate (Cfa) and a semi-arid climate (BSh/BSk).

Mthatha is prone to severe thundersoms, some of which are tornadic in nature. Mthatha has been hit by several tornadoes between 1995 and 2023, the most recent being the EF3 tornado that damaged residential areas near the airport, including the airport itself.

On 10 June 2025, seven people died in flooding in Mthatha and at least 79 in the Eastern Cape province. Houses and cars were left submerged, with reports of missing people in some areas. Residents were trapped on top of the roofs of their houses, with some clinging to trees while schools were closed, and flights to Mthatha Airport were cancelled due to bad weather. A minibus carrying high school pupils was swept away by floodwaters and a number of the passengers were reported missing. This was after disruptive rain and snowy weather in the Eastern Cape and the neighbouring KwaZulu-Natal. The death toll has since risen to 90.

== See also ==
- Kei River
- Mthatha River
- Transkei
