= OR Tambo District Municipality =

OR Tambo
- District municipality
- Seal

- Location in the Eastern Cape
- Interactive map of O R Tambo District Municipality (2026)
- Coordinates: 31°34′S 28°46′E
- Country: South Africa
- Province: Eastern Cape
- Seat: Mthatha
- Local municipalities: List: Ngquza Hill; Port St Johns; Nyandeni; Kumkani Mhlontlo; King Sabata Dalindyebo

Government
  - Type: Municipal council
  - Mayor: Mesuli Ngqondwana (ANC)

Area
  - Total: 12,096 km^{2} (4,670 sq mi)

Population (2011)
  - Total: 1,364,943
  - Density: 112.84/km^{2} (292.26/sq mi)

Racial makeup (2011)
  - Black African: 99.0%
  - Coloured: 0.5%
  - Indian/Asian: 0.2%
  - White: 0.2%

First languages (2011)
  - Xhosa: 94.2%
  - English: 2.7%
  - Other: 3.1%
- Time zone: UTC+2 (SAST)
- Municipal code: DC15

The OR Tambo District Municipality (Xhosa: uMasipala weSithili sase OR Tambo) is one of the seven districts of the Eastern Cape province of South Africa. It is within the Wild Coast Region. The seat is Mthatha. As of 2011, the vast majority (94%) of its 1,364,943 inhabitants spoke isiXhosa. The district is named after Oliver Tambo. The district code is DC15.

== Geography ==
=== Neighbours ===
OR Tambo is surrounded by:

- Alfred Nzo District (DC44) to the north
- the Indian Ocean to the south-east
- Amatole District (DC12) to the south-west
- Chris Hani District (DC13) to the west
- Joe Gqabi District (DC14) to the north-west

=== Local municipalities ===
The district contains the following local municipalities:

Local municipality	Population	%
King Sabata Dalindyebo	415,227	24.77%
Nyandeni	281,252	16.78%
Ngquza Hill	255,371	15.23%
Kumkani Mhlontlo	196,675	11.73%
Port St Johns	146,134	8.72%

After the 2011 municipal election, OR Tambo District shrank, with Mbizana and Ntabankulu local municipalities being transferred to Alfred Nzo District Municipality.

== Demographics ==
The following statistics are from the 2011 census.

Language	Population	%
Xhosa	1,270,514	94.21%
English	36,321	2.69%
Afrikaans	7,374	0.17%
Sign language	10,388	0.77%
Zulu	6,664	0.49%
Other	3,854	0.29%
Sotho	3,590	0.27%
Northern Sotho	3,366	0.25%
Ndebele	2,853	0.21%
Tswana	1,864	0.14%
Venda	874	0.06%
Swati	445	0.03%
Tsonga	440	0.03%

=== Gender ===
Gender	Population	%
Female	734,856	53.84%
Male	630,088	46.16%

=== Ethnic group ===
Ethnic group	Population	%
Black African	1,351,789	99.04%
Coloured	6,434	0.47%
White	2,641	0.19%
Indian/Asian	2,654	0.19%
Other	1,425	0.10%

=== Age ===
Age	Population	%
000–004	215,814	12.87%
005–009	267,090	15.93%
010–014	268,632	16.02%
015–019	223,484	13.33%
020–024	135,214	8.07%
025–029	93,877	5.60%
030–034	74,041	4.42%
035–039	70,360	4.20%
040–044	65,698	3.92%
045–049	50,357	3.00%
050–054	41,828	2.50%
055–059	32,556	1.94%
060–064	43,877	2.62%
065–069	35,462	2.12%
070–074	30,004	1.79%
075–079	13,399	0.80%
080–084	10,224	0.61%
085–089	2,714	0.16%
090–094	1,219	0.07%
095–099	479	0.03%
100 plus	134	0.01%

== Politics ==
=== Election results ===
Election results for OR Tambo in the South African general election, 2004.

- Population 18 and over: 782 012 (46.65% of total population)
- Total votes: 496 206 (29.60% of total population)
- Voting % estimate: 63.45% votes as a % of population 18 and over

Party	Votes	%
African National Congress	392,740	79.15%
United Democratic Movement	91,722	18.48%
African Christian Democratic Party	2,763	0.56%
Pan African Congress	2,733	0.55%
Democratic Alliance	1,141	0.23%
SOPA	675	0.14%
United Christian Democratic Party	583	0.12%
Inkhata Freedom Party	535	0.11%
Azanian People's Organisation	508	0.10%
EMSA	425	0.09%
New National Party	381	0.08%
PJC	353	0.07%
Freedom Front Plus	314	0.06%
UF	282	0.06%
Independent Democrats	259	0.05%
TOP	211	0.04%
NA	158	0.03%
CDP	145	0.03%
NLP	100	0.02%
KISS	90	0.02%
Minority Front	88	0.02%
Total	496,206	100.00%
