= List of mountain passes of the Eastern Cape =

This is a list of publicly accessible, motorable passes in the Eastern Cape province, South Africa.

== List of Passes in the Eastern Cape province ==
Name	Location	Highest Point	Road	Between towns	Road surface
All Saints Neck	31.6767°S 28.0127°E		R61	Mthatha and Engcobo	tar
Barkly Pass	31.2357°S 27.8419°E		R58	Elliot and Barkly East	tar
Baster Voetslaan Pass	31.1748°S 27.9795°E		pass joins R393	Barkly Pass and Ugie	rough gravel
Baviaanskloof	33.6464°S 24.4554°E			Willowmore and Hankey	gravel
Bidstone Pass	30.7150°S 27.8307°E			near Tiffindell Ski Resort	gravel
Blaauwkrantz Pass	33.3853°S 26.7051°E		R67	Grahamstown and Port Alfred	tar
Boesmanshoek Pass	31.4982°S 26.4854°E		R397	Molteno and Sterkstroom	tar
Bruintjieshoogte Pass	32.6795°S 25.3458°E		R63	Somerset East and Pearston	tar
Buffalo Pass	33.0353°S 27.7979°E		M5	East London	wide tar
Buffelshoek Pass	32.4864°S 25.2340°E		R337	Pearston and Cradock	gravel
Bulhoek Pass	31.2395°S 25.7065°E			Steynsburg	gravel
Buyspoort (Buispoort)	33.3499°S 23.4344°E		N9	Uniondale and Willowmore	tar
Cala Pass	31.4737°S 27.7234°E		R410	Elliot and Cala	tar
Carlislehoekspruit Pass	30.7188°S 27.9568°E			Rhodes and Tiffendell	steep gravel
Cats Pass	32.4281°S 28.4352°E			Butterworth and Mazeppa Bay	
Colonanek	30.6463°S 29.0480°E			Mount Frere and Cedarville	
Combrink's Pass	33.6529°S 24.5013°E				
Daggaboers Nek	32.5356°S 25.8431°E		N10	Cookhouse and Cradock	tar
De Beer's Pass	32.3150°S 26.1857°E			Cookhouse and Tarkastad	
Devil's Bellows	32.4163°S 26.6667°E			Balfour and Whittlesea	bad gravel
Dontsa Pass	32.6132°S 27.2437°E		R352	Keiskammahoek and Stutterheim	
Doringnek	33.3806°S 25.7112°E		R335	Addo and Somerset East	gravel
Ecca Pass	33.2006°S 26.6185°E		R67	Grahamstown and Fort Beaufort	tar
Fonteinkloof Pass	33.5947°S 26.1224°E		R72	Port Elizabeth and Alexandria	tar
Fuller's Hoek Pass	32.6885°S 26.5195°E			Fort Fordyce Nature Reserve	gravel
Ghwarriepoort	33.3881°S 23.3918°E		N9	Uniondale and Williston	
Grasnek Pass	33.6490°S 24.3433°E				
Greylings Pass	31.1188°S 27.2999°E		R396	Dordrecht and Barkly East	
Groot-Doringhoek Pass	31.3795°S 26.0736°E		R391	Hofmeyr and Molteno	gravel
Hankey Pass	33.8821°S 24.8401°E		R330	Humansdorp and Hankey	tar
Helspoort Pass	33.1701°S 26.3209°E		R350	Grahamstown and Bedford	tar
Hogsback Pass	32.6136°S 26.9134°E		R345	Alice and Cathcart	good tar
Holgat Pass	33.6403°S 24.4563°E				
Joubert's Pass	30.7167°S 27.2440°E	2349	detour off R58	Lady Grey and Barkly East	gravel
Kareedouw Pass	33.9621°S 24.2667°E			Kareedouw and Knysna	
Katberg Pass	32.4561°S 26.6547°E			Balfour and Whittlesea	gravel
Kei Cuttings	32.5499°S 27.9639°E		N2	Komga and Butterworth	wide tar
Killian's Pass	31.1832°S 27.2953°E			Dordrecht and Barkly East	
Kumajaba Pass	31.2840°S 28.5357°E			Maclear	
Kwaaiman Pass	31.7253°S 27.6956°E			Cala and Tsomo	
Lehana's Pass	30.6787°S 28.2007°E				
Lootsberg Pass	31.8272°S 24.8555°E			Graaff Reinet and Middelburg, Eastern Cape	tar
Lundin's Neck (often misspelt Lundean's Nek)	30.6471°S 27.7422°E	2162	R393	Tele Bridge and Barkly East	gravel
Michel's Pass	32.5621°S 26.8610°E			Seymour and Hogsback	gravel
Mlengana Pass	31.5449°S 29.1814°E			Mthatha and Port St. Johns	
Moordenaarsnek	30.8397°S 28.5440°E		R56	Mount Fletcher and Maclear	wide tar
Munnikspoort	32.2980°S 24.5243°E		N9	Aberdeen and Graaff-Reinet	tar
Naudeberg Pass	31.9682°S 24.7190°E				tar
Naude's Neck Pass	30.7600°S 28.0761°E			Maclear and Rhodes	gravel
Nico Malan Pass	32.4807°S 26.8361°E		R67	Fort Beaufort and Whittlesea	tar
Nonesis Nek Pass	31.8416°S 26.9883°E			Queenstown and Lady Frere	tar
Nuwekloof Pass	33.5160°S 23.6460°E			Willowmore and Baviaanskloof	gravel
Olifantskop Pass	33.3189°S 25.9465°E		N10	Paterson and Cookhouse	wide tar
Otto Du Plessis Pass	31.2346°S 27.5305°E			Ida - Clifford	gravel
Ouberg Pass (Oude Berg Pass)	32.1212°S 24.4077°E			Graaff Reinet and Murraysburg	
Pefferskop Pass	32.6501°S 26.8827°E			Seymour and Dimfield	gravel
Penhoek Pass	31.4626°S 26.7015°E		N6	Queenstown and Aliwal North	tar
Perdepoort	33.1888°S 23.4314°E		N9	Graaff Reinet and Willowmore	
Pitseng Pass	30.7573°S 28.3057°E			Mount Fletcher and Barkly East	
Pot River Pass	30.9326°S 28.2103°E		R396	Maclear and Barkly East	gravel
Potter's Pass	33.0406°S 27.8695°E			Westbank, East London	urban
Qacha's Nek	30.1283°S 28.6863°E				gravel
Red Hill Pass	32.7116°S 27.1836°E		R352	Keiskammahoek and King Williams Town	
Satansnek	31.5984°S 27.9433°E			Mthatha and Cala	
Smuts Pass	31.4070°S 26.7920°E			Dordrecht and Molteno	tar
Soutpansnek	32.8733°S 24.7137°E		R75	Jansenville and Graaff Reinet	tar
Stormsrivier Pass	33.9888°S 23.9118°E				
Suurberg Pass	33.2835°S 25.7202°E			Patterson to Stonefountain	
Swaershoek Pass	32.3468°S 25.4611°E			Cradock and Pearston	
Swanepoelspoort	33.1143°S 23.8940°E			Willowmore and Jansenville	
Tarka Pass	32.4719°S 25.6666°E			Cradock and Somerset East	wide tar
Van Stadens Pass	33.9128°S 25.2025°E		R102	Port Elizabeth and Humansdorp	wide tar
Wapadsberg Pass	31.9311°S 24.8837°E		R61	Cradock and Nieu-Bethesda	tar
Witnek Pass	31.8811°S 24.6954°E			Nieu-Bethesda and Cradock	
Witkransnek Pass				Middelburg and Cradock	tar

== See also ==
- Mountain Passes of South Africa
