= List of cities and towns in the Eastern Cape =

This is a list of cities and towns in the Eastern Cape province of South Africa.

In the case of settlements that have had their official names changed the traditional name is listed first followed by the new name.

== Amatola Region ==
- Adelaide (iKhobonqaba)
- Alice (iDikeni)
- Aliwal North (Maletswai)
- Sophangisa's land
- Barkly East
- Bethulie
- Berlin (Ntabozuko)
- Bisho (Bhisho)
- Braunschweig
- Burgersdorp
- Cala
- Cathcart
- Cedarville
- Cofimvaba
- Dohne
- Dordrecht
- East London
- Elliot (Khowa)
- Engcobo (Ngcobo)
- Fort Beaufort (KwaMaqoma)
- Gonubie
- Haga-Haga
- Hamburg
- Hogsback
- Hofmeyr
- Indwe
- Jamestown
- Katberg
- Kei Mouth
- Keiskammahoek
- Kidds Beach
- King William's Town (Qonce)
- Komga
- Lady Frere (Cacadu)
- Lady Grey
- Maclear (Nqanqarhu)
- Mdantsane
- Hertzog (Mhlangeni)
- Molteno
- Morgan's Bay (Gxarha)
- Mount Frere
- Oyster Bay
- Peddie
- Queenstown (Komani)
- Seymour
- Sterkspruit
- Sterkstroom
- Stutterheim
- Tarkastad
- Tsomo
- Venterstad
- Whittlesea
- Zwelitsha

== The Western Region ==
- Aberdeen
- Addo
- Alexandria
- Bathurst
- Bedford
- Cookhouse
- Cradock (Nxuba)
- Despatch
- Enon
- Port Elizabeth (Gqeberha)
- Graaff Reinet
- Grahamstown (Makhanda)
- Hankey
- Humansdorp
- Jeffreys Bay
- Joubertina
- Kareedouw
- Kenton-on-Sea
- Kirkwood (Nqweba)
- Krakeelrivier
- Middelburg
- Nieu-Bethesda
- Patensie
- Paterson
- Port Alfred
- Salem
- Somerset East (KwaNojoli)
- St Francis Bay
- Steynsburg, Eastern Cape
- Steytlerville
- Uitenhage (Kariega)
- Willowmore

== The Wild Coast ==
- Bizana
- Butterworth (Gcuwa)
- Kentani (Centane)
- Cintsa (Chintsa)
- Coffee Bay
- Elliotdale
- Flagstaff
- Idutywa (Dutywa)
- Lady Frere (Cacadu)
- Libode
- Lusikisiki
- Matatiele
- Mount Fletcher (Tlokoeng)
- Mount Ayliff (eMaxesibeni)
- Mount Frere (KwaBhaca)
- Nqamakwe
- Ngqeleni
- Port St Johns
- Qolora Mouth
- Qumbu
- Tabankulu (Ntabankulu)
- Tsolo
- Umtata (Mthatha)
- Willowvale (Gatyane)
