= R56 (South Africa) =

Road in South Africa

Provincial route R56

Route information
- Maintained by ECDRPW and KZNDT
- Length: 576 km (358 mi)

Major junctions
- West end: N9 / N10 in Middelburg
- N6 between Molteno and Dordrecht; R58 in Khowa; N2 near Kokstad; N2 near Harding
- East end: N3 in Pietermaritzburg

Location
- Country: South Africa
- Major cities: Middelburg, Steynsburg, Molteno, Dordrecht, Indwe, Khowa, Ugie, Maclear, Mount Fletcher, Matatiele, Kokstad, Ixopo, Richmond, Pietermaritzburg

Highway system
- Numbered routes of South Africa
← R55	→ R57

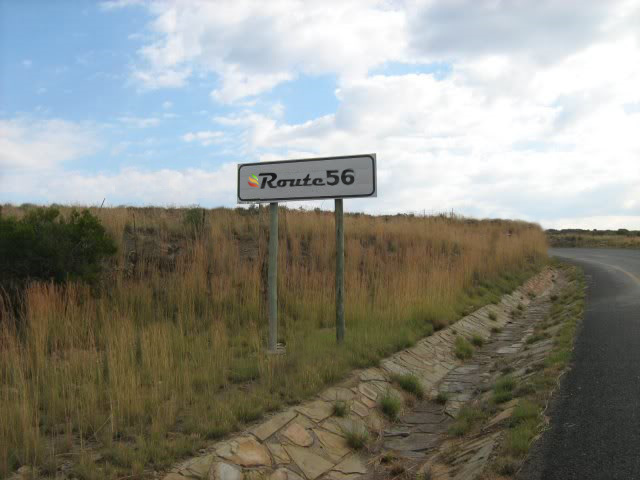
R56 between Steynsburg and Molteno in the Eastern Cape

The R56 is a provincial route in South Africa that connects Middelburg with Pietermaritzburg via Molteno, Maclear and Kokstad. It is co-signed with the N2 between Kokstad and Stafford's Post for 39 kilometres.

The R56 is known for being part of the shortest route between Cape Town in the Western Cape and Durban in KwaZulu-Natal. There are 12 main towns on the R56, namely Middelburg Karoo, Steynsburg, Molteno, Dordrecht, Khowa, Ugie, Maclear, Matatiele, Kokstad, Ixopo, Richmond and Pietermaritzburg.

== Route ==
Detailed Route

=== Eastern Cape ===
The R56 begins in the Middelburg town centre, at a junction with Meintjies Street. West of this junction, it is the R398 road. It begins by going eastwards to form an intersection with the N9 & N10 national route co-signage.

From the N9/N10 interchange, the R56 goes eastwards for 75 kilometres, through Rosmead, to meet the R390 road from Hofmeyr. The R56 & R390 become one road for 10 kilometres into the town of Steynsburg. They enter the Steynsburg CBD in a southerly direction after bypassing the Khayamnandi suburb and they turn east at Van Riebeeck Street. East of the town centre, the R390 becomes its own road northwards while the R56 remains facing eastwards.

The R56 continues eastwards for 30 kilometres to meet the R391 road and turn to the east-south-east. It proceeds for 17 kilometres to meet the R397 road. The R56 & R397 are one road south-east for 15 kilometres, through the town of Molteno (where it makes a left & right turn), before the R397 becomes its own road southwards.

From the R397 junction, the R56 goes eastwards for 30 kilometres to meet the N6 national route south of Jamestown. It continues eastwards for 35 kilometres to enter the town of Dordrecht and meet the R392 road. The R56 & R392 are one road north-east for 4 kilometres before the R392 becomes its own road northwards.

The R56 goes east-south-east for 34 kilometres to meet the R396 road in the town of Indwe. The R56 & R396 are one road north-east for 5 kilometres before the R396 becomes its own road northwards. The R56 proceeds eastwards for 43 kilometres to meet the R58 road from Ngcobo. The R56 & R58 are one road north-east for 8 kilometres into the town of Khowa (formerly Elliot), before the R58 becomes its own road northwards in the Khowa town centre.

From Khowa, the R56 goes north-east for 69 kilometres to meet the R396 road again in the town of Maclear. They are one road westwards in the town centre before the R56 becomes the road northwards. The R56 goes north-north-east for 128 kilometres, called the Moordenaarsnek Pass up to the town of Mount Fletcher, to the town of Matatiele.

From Matatiele, the R56 goes eastwards for 25 kilometres, through Cedarville, to cross the Mzimvubu River. Just after crossing the Mzimvubu River, the R56 leaves the Eastern Cape Province and enters KwaZulu-Natal.

=== KwaZulu-Natal ===
From the Mzimvubu River crossing east of Cedarville, the R56 goes eastwards for 45 kilometres to enter the town of Kokstad, where it meets the south-western terminus of the R617 road in the town centre. The R56 turns southwards at this junction and proceeds to form a junction with the N2 national route south of the town. The R56 joins the N2 and they are one road eastwards for 38 kilometres before the R56 becomes its own road to the north-east at the Strafford's Post junction.

From the N2 split, the R56 goes north-north-east for 63 kilometres, through Rietvlei and Umzimkhulu (where it crosses the Umzimkulu River), to the town of Ixopo, where it meets the R612 road. From Ixopo, the R56 goes north for 81 kilometres, crossing the Umkomazi River, through Richmond, Hopewell and Thornville, to enter the city of Pietermaritzburg.

West of Pietermaritzburg Airport, the R56 meets the R103 road and they are co-signed northwards through the western area of the suburb of Scottsville. At a t-junction adjacent to the Msunduzi River, the R103 becomes the road westwards (Chief Albert Luthuli Street) while the R56 becomes the road eastwards. It goes through the northern part of the Scottsville suburb as New England Road to reach its eastern terminus at an off-ramp junction with the N3 national route.
