= R344 (South Africa) =

Regional Route in South Africa

Regional route R344
- R344 route map

Location
- Country: South Africa

Highway system
- Numbered routes of South Africa
← R343	→ R345

The R344 is a Regional Route in South Africa that connects Grahamstown with Dordrecht.

== Route ==
Its northern origin is the R56 at Dordrecht. It heads south-west, crossing the N6 to reach Sterkstroom. Here it crosses the R397 at a staggered junction. It leaves the town heading south-west to reach Tarkastad. At Tarkastad it crosses the R61 at a staggered junction. It leaves the town heading south. It reaches the R63 just west of Adelaide and together they head east into the town. East of the town, the road leaves heading south to its southern terminus at the R350 between Grahamstown and Riebeek East.
