= Pot River Pass =

Mountain pass in Eastern Cape, South Africa

Coordinates: 30°55′57.2″S 28°12′36.9″E

Pot River Pass is a mountain pass situated in the Eastern Cape province of South Africa, on the regional road R396, between Maclear, Eastern Cape and Barkly East. It is also referred to as the Tsitsa Path.
