= Greylings Pass =

Pass in South Africa

Coordinates: 31°07′07.7″S 27°17′59.8″E

Greylings Pass, is situated in the Eastern Cape, province of South Africa, on the regional road R396, between Dordrecht, South Africa and Barkly East.
