= Killian's Pass =

Road in Eastern Cape, South Africa

Coordinates: 31°10′59.5″S 27°17′43.0″E

Killian's Pass, is situated in the Eastern Cape, province of South Africa, on the road between Dordrecht, Eastern Cape and Barkly East.

== See also ==
- List of mountain passes of the Eastern Cape
