= Griqualand-East Commando =

Griqualand East Commando
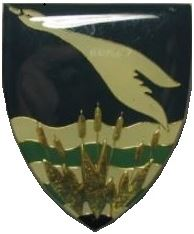
- Griqualand East Commando Emblem
- Active: 1953-
- Country: South Africa
- Allegiance: Republic of South Africa; Republic of South Africa
- Branch: South African Army; South African Army
- Type: Infantry
- Role: Light Infantry
- Size: One Battalion
- Part of: South African Infantry Corps; Army Territorial Reserve
- Garrison/HQ: Kokstad · Cedarville

Griqualand East Commando was a light infantry regiment of the South African Army. It formed part of the South African Army Infantry Formation as well as the South African Territorial Reserve.

== History ==
=== Origins ===
==== Rifle Association ====
Griqualand East Commando can trace its origin to a Defence Rifle Association formed by a Captain Woods of the Cape Mounted Rifles around 1884. Its primary aim was for the farming community to be able to defend themselves against hostile tribes that stole their cattle.

=== Operations ===
==== With the UDF ====
By 1948, the Griqualand East Rifle Association was formed to manage local area defence. In 1953, Mount Currie Rifle Association in Kokstad amalgamated with the Grqiualand East Rifle Association which saw the formation of the Commando in Kokstad.

==== With the SADF ====
By 1984 however the commando moved to Cedarville as a disused school had become available for accommodation.

===== Area of responsibility =====
Griqualand East Commando was responsible for the magisterial district of Mount Currie.

===== Higher headquarters =====
The commando was under the command of Natal Command from 1930 to 1950 but then placed under Eastern Province Command, this situation reverted again in 1960 due to the establishment of the Transkei.

===== Freedom of entry =====
The Freedom of the town of Kokstad was granted to the commando in 1993.

==== With the SANDF ====
===== Disbandment =====
This unit, along with all other Commando units was disbanded after a decision by South African President Thabo Mbeki to disband all Commando Units. The Commando system was phased out between 2003 and 2008 "because of the role it played in the apartheid era", according to the Minister of Safety and Security Charles Nqakula.

== Unit Insignia ==
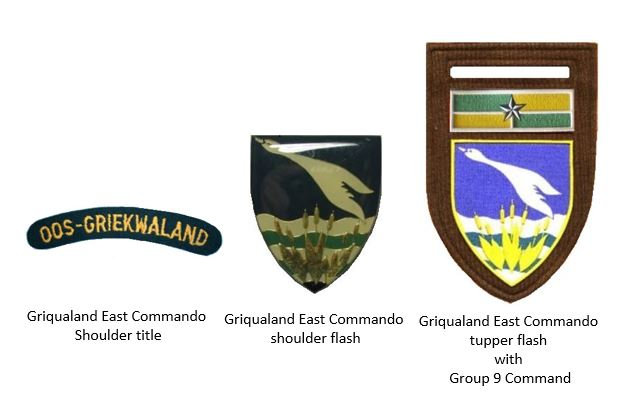
SADF era Griqualand East Commando insignia

== Leadership ==
- Cmdt A.L.A. Maartins 1952-1972
- Cmdt J.H. Venter 1973-1977
- Cmdt S.A. Ponder 1977-1981
- Lt Col D.W. Schoeman 1982-

== See also ==
- South African Commando System
