= R409 road =

R409 road may refer to:

- R409 road (Ireland)
- R409 road (South Africa)
