= Nuwekloof Pass =

Two mountain passes in South Africa are named Nuwekloof Pass:

- Nuwekloof Pass (Eastern Cape) on the R332 in the Baviaanskloof
- Nuwekloof Pass (Western Cape) on the R46 between Gouda and Tulbagh
