= Baster Voetslaan Pass =

Coordinates: 31°10′29.2″S 27°58′46.3″E

Baster Voetslaan Pass, also known as Baster Voetpad ("bastard's footpath"), is a mountain pass situated in the Eastern Cape, South Africa, on the R393 regional road. It is located between Barkly Pass and Ugie, Eastern Cape. The road through the pass was first built in 1862.

- Driving Skill level: Novice to skilled depending on season
- Road condition: Gravel surface, sharp turns, snowfalls, slippery
- Remarks: Snowfall in season
