= Joubert (disambiguation) =

Joubert is a surname. It may also refer to:

- Joubert (footballer), Brazilian football player and manager
- Joubert Engelbrecht (born 1989), South African rugby union player playing in Spain
- Joubert Horn (born 1988), South African former rugby union player
- Rue Joubert a street in the 9th arrondissement of Paris
- Joubert Rock, Graham Land, Antarctica
- Joubert, a lost manuscript, part of the Chronique romane, a chronicle of the French city of Montpellier

== See also ==
- Joubert v Enslin, an important case in South African contract law
- Joubert's Pass, a mountain pass in the Eastern Cape province of South Africa
- Joubert syndrome, a genetic disorder
