= R58 (South Africa) =

Provincial route in South Africa

Provincial route R58

Route information
- Maintained by NCDRPW and ECDRPW
- Length: 413 km (257 mi)

Major junctions
- West end: N1 in Colesberg
- N6 in Aliwal North; R56 in Khowa
- East end: R61 in Ngcobo

Location
- Country: South Africa
- Major cities: Colesberg, Burgersdorp, Aliwal North, Lady Grey, Barkly East, Khowa, Ngcobo

Highway system
- Numbered routes of South Africa
← R57	→ R59

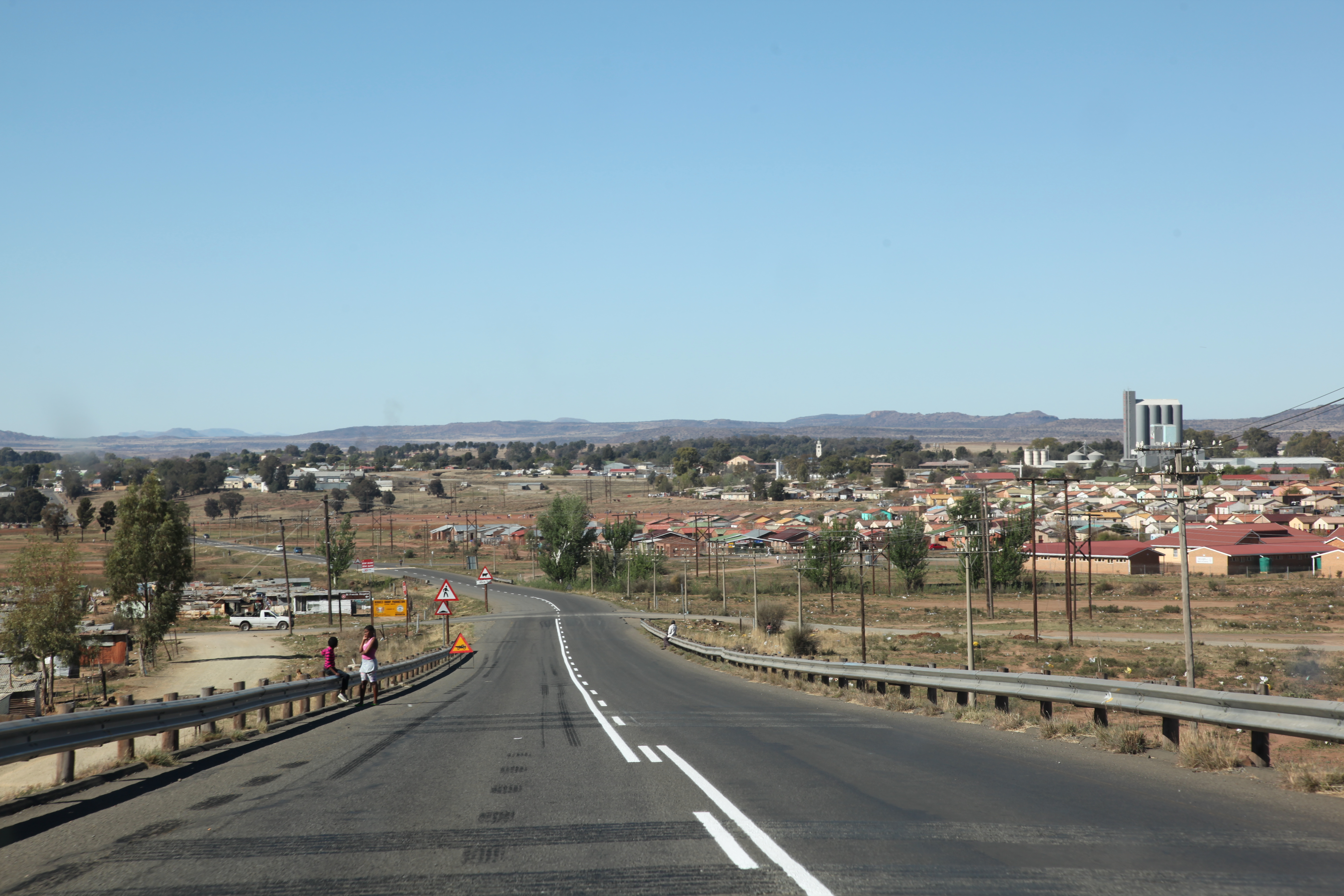
Entering Aliwal North from the west on the R58

The R58 is a provincial route in South Africa that connects Colesberg with Ngcobo via Aliwal North, Barkly East and Khowa.

== Route ==
Detailed Route

Towns on the R58 route include Colesberg, Norvalspont, Venterstad, Burgersdorp, Aliwal North, Lady Grey, Barkly East, Elliot and Ngcobo.

The R58 begins in Colesberg, Northern Cape at an interchange with the N1 national route, the R369 road and the R717 road. It goes eastwards for 77 kilometres, through Norvalspont, crossing into the Eastern Cape, bypassing the Gariep Dam, to the town of Venterstad.

From Venterstad, the R58 goes east-south-east for 58 kilometres to the town of Burgersdorp, where it meets the R391 road. It turns to the north-east and goes for 56 kilometres to the town of Aliwal North (renamed Maletswai in 2016), where it enters as Grey Street and meets the N6 national route. The R58 and the N6 are co-signed southwards for 120 metres up to the Young Street junction, where the R58 becomes its own road eastwards.

From Maletswai, the R58 goes eastwards for 54 kilometres, crossing the Kraai River, to the town of Lady Grey, meeting the R392 road just before the town. They become one road past Lady Grey for 26 kilometres southwards, before the R392 becomes its own road southwards while the R58 turns to the south-east. It goes for another 39 kilometres south-east, crossing the Kraai River one last time, to the town of Barkly East. Just before Barkly East, it meets the R396 road and they are one road eastwards into the town before splitting in the town centre.

From Barkly East, the R58 goes south-south-east for 62 kilometres as the Barkly Pass to the town of Khowa (formerly Elliot), where it meets the R56 road in the town centre. They are one road south-west for 8 kilometres before the R58 becomes its own road southwards. After 5 kilometres, the R58 meets the northern terminus of the R410 road (Cala Pass) and the R58 becomes the road to the south-east from this junction. It goes for 40 kilometres to reach its end at a junction with the R61 road in the town of Ngcobo.
