= R409 (South Africa) =

Regional route in South Africa

Regional route R409

Location
- Country: South Africa

Highway system
- Numbered routes of South Africa
← R408	→ R410

The R409 is a Regional Route in South Africa. Its northern terminus is the R61 between Cofimvaba and Ngcobo. It heads south-east to Tsomo where it meets with the eastern terminus of the R352. From Tsomo, it continues south-east, through Nqamakwe to the N2 at Ndabakazi. It is cosigned with the N2 for 12 km east to Butterworth. From Butterworth, it heads south-east again to Kentani, where it reaches its southern terminus at the R349.
