= Joubert's Pass =

Mountain pass in Eastern Cape, South Africa

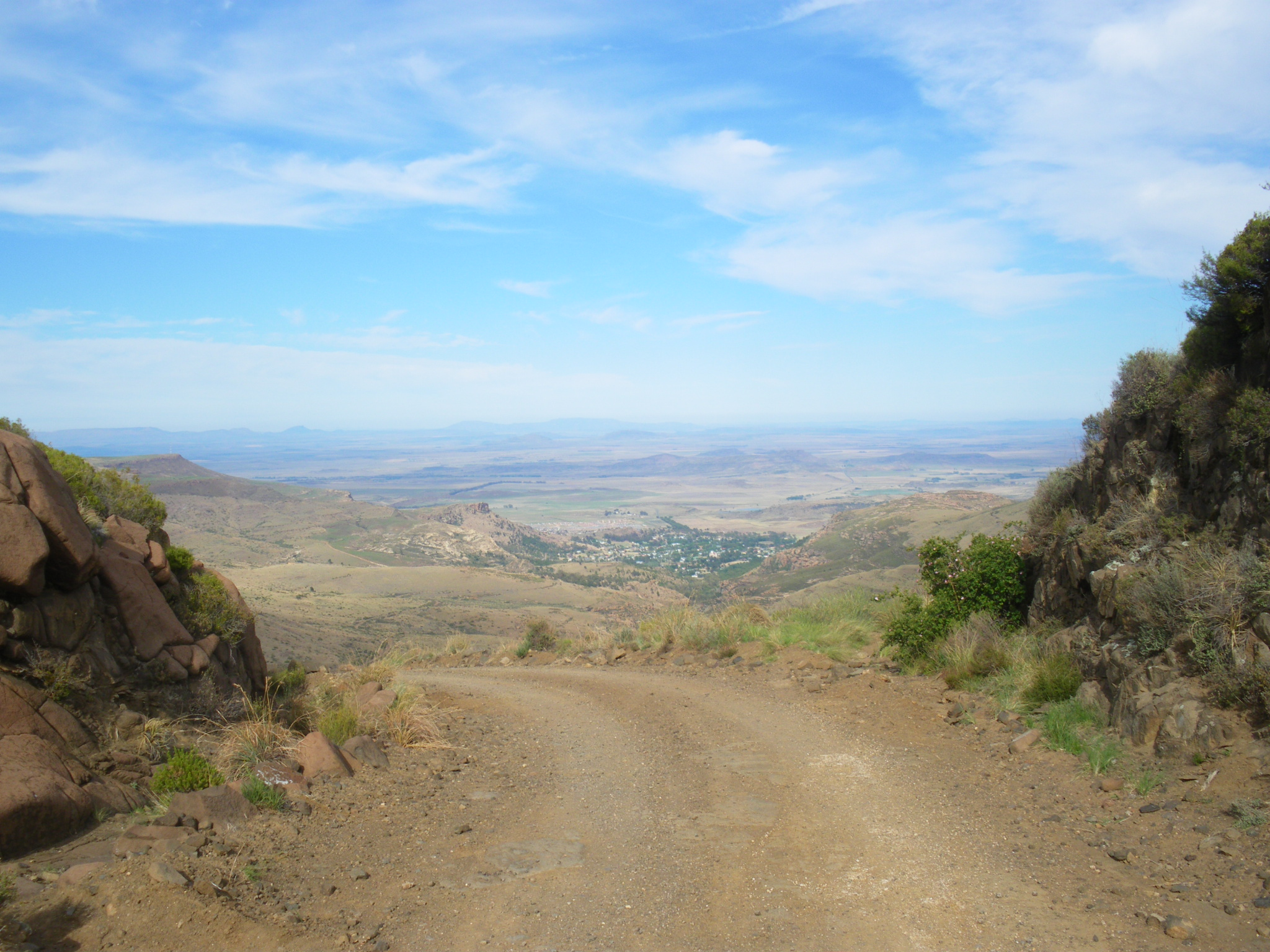

Joubert's Pass, is a mountain pass in the Senqu Local Municipality area in the Eastern Cape province of South Africa. It is a gravel road with a maximum gradient of 1:6. It reaches an elevation of 2236m above sea level at the highest point.

Joubert's Pass is situated on a road that turns out eastward from the tarred R58 after passing through Lady Grey at, crosses the Witteberg (white mountain due to the crest often covered in snow during winter), a branch of the Drakensberg (dragon mountain), meanders through farmlands and meets up again with the tarred R58 that links Aliwal North to Barkly East at .

Before the existence of Joubert's pass, farmers on the other side of Witteberg had to take a long detour to get to Lady Grey. A survey was done for the construction of a road from Lady Grey Nek to cross the mountain via the farm Burnet to Gairtney. It was estimated that such a road would cost at least between five and six thousand pounds. The route travelled today (Joubert's pass) was considered an impassable one – only fit for baboons.

About 40 years after the survey, farmers from the other side of the mountain decided that enough was enough and took the matter into their own hands. Seven farmers of which five had the surname Joubert took up their implements and proceeded to construct a wagon road as they saw fit. The others were Stephenson and Cloete. This passage through the mountains was built using only manual labour. The most difficult part of the road, a length of six miles, had been constructed for the sum of £1156 10s and a further six miles or so had been made for £50. The enterprise of this syndicate would take some beating. Helvellyn, once fifty miles by road from Lady Grey, is now only seven, Ossa fifteen instead of 35, and other farms in proportion. They ended up with one of the highest mountain passes in South Africa.

The opening ceremony took place on 17 December 1914. This was a red letter day for Lady Grey. A procession of spiders, carts and buggies started from the Central Hotel at 8:10 and they reached the summit in a little over an hour and a half. The ladies were exceedingly hospitable and provided good things in such quantities that the guests' powers were unequal to the occasion, consequently much of the supplies had to be carried home again. At least 80 Ladies and Gentlemen were present. The Mayor, Mr. Lilford formally opened the road under the name of “Joubert's Pass.” The stone tablet on the top of the pass credits five Jouberts: Gideon (Sr.), Daniel Francois, Christiaan de Wet, Gideon (Jr.) and Johannes Marthinus Joubert, plus George Friedrich Stephenson and Cornelius Willem Cloete. The initials MP at the bottom stand for Moos Pieterse, who also carved many of the headstones in the old cemetery in Lady Grey. (Information about the opening ceremony obtained from Northern Post 20 Dec. 1914)
