= R410 road =

R410 road may refer to:

- R410 road (Ireland)
- R410 road (South Africa)
