= Pitseng Pass =

Coordinates: 30°45′26.3″S 28°18′20.6″E

Pitseng Pass is situated in the Eastern Cape, province of South Africa, on the R396 road between Mount Fletcher and Barkly East.

The road through the pass was tared in the late 1980s.
