= Disa montana =

Scientific classification
- Kingdom: Plantae
- Clade: Tracheophytes
- Clade: Angiosperms
- Clade: Monocots
- Order: Asparagales
- Family: Orchidaceae
- Subfamily: Orchidoideae
- Genus: Disa
- Species: D. montana

Binomial name
- Disa montana Sond.

Synonyms
- Disa poikilantha Kraenzl.

Species of flowering plant

Disa montana, commonly known as the montane disa, is a perennial plant and geophyte belonging to the genus Disa. The plant is endemic to the Eastern Cape and occurs from Ramatseliso's Gate to Elliot at altitudes of 1600-2400 m. The plant has lost habitat to plantations, overgrazing, excessive fires and erosion.
