= Cats Pass =

Mountain pass in South Africa

Coordinates: 32°25′41.2″S 28°26′06.8″E

Cats Pass, is situated in the Eastern Cape, province of South Africa, on the road between Butterworth and Mazeppa Bay.
