= Boesmanshoek Pass =

Mountain pass between Molento and Sterkstroom, in the Eastern Cape

Coordinates: 31°29′53.6″S 26°29′07.4″E

Boesmanshoek Pass is a mountain pass situated in the Eastern Cape, South Africa, on the Regional R397 (Eastern Cape), the road between Molteno, Eastern Cape and Sterkstroom. It is less than 4 km long.
