= R352 road =

R352 road may refer to:

- R352 road (Ireland)
- R352 road (South Africa)
