= R410 (South Africa) =

Regional Route in South Africa

Regional route R410

Route information
- Length: 106 km (66 mi)

Major junctions
- West end: R392 near Komani
- R396 near Lady Frere
- East end: R58 near Khowa

Location
- Country: South Africa

Highway system
- Numbered routes of South Africa
← R409	→ R411

The R410 is a Regional Route in South Africa that connects Komani with Khowa via Lady Frere and Cala.

== Route ==
Its western terminus is a junction with the R392 approximately 9 kilometres east of Komani, next to the Bongolo Dam. It heads east-north-east for 38 kilometres, crossing the White Kei River, to reach the town of Lady Frere. It proceeds east-north-east for 52 kilometres, meeting the southern terminus of the R396, to cross the Tsomo River and enter the town of Cala, where it passes through as Titsa Street. It continues north-east as the Cala Pass for 14 kilometres to end at a junction with the R58 approximately 14 kilometres south-west of Khowa.
