= Satansnek =

Mountain pass in South Africa

Coordinates: 31°35′54.1″S 27°56′35.9″E

Satansnek Pass, or just Satansnek, is situated in the Eastern Cape, province of South Africa. It is traversed by the R58 road between Mthatha and Cala, Eastern Cape.

== Environment ==
The climate of the pass is cool and moist. It is home to numerous orchids and is the only place where wild Crocosmia masoniorum can be found.

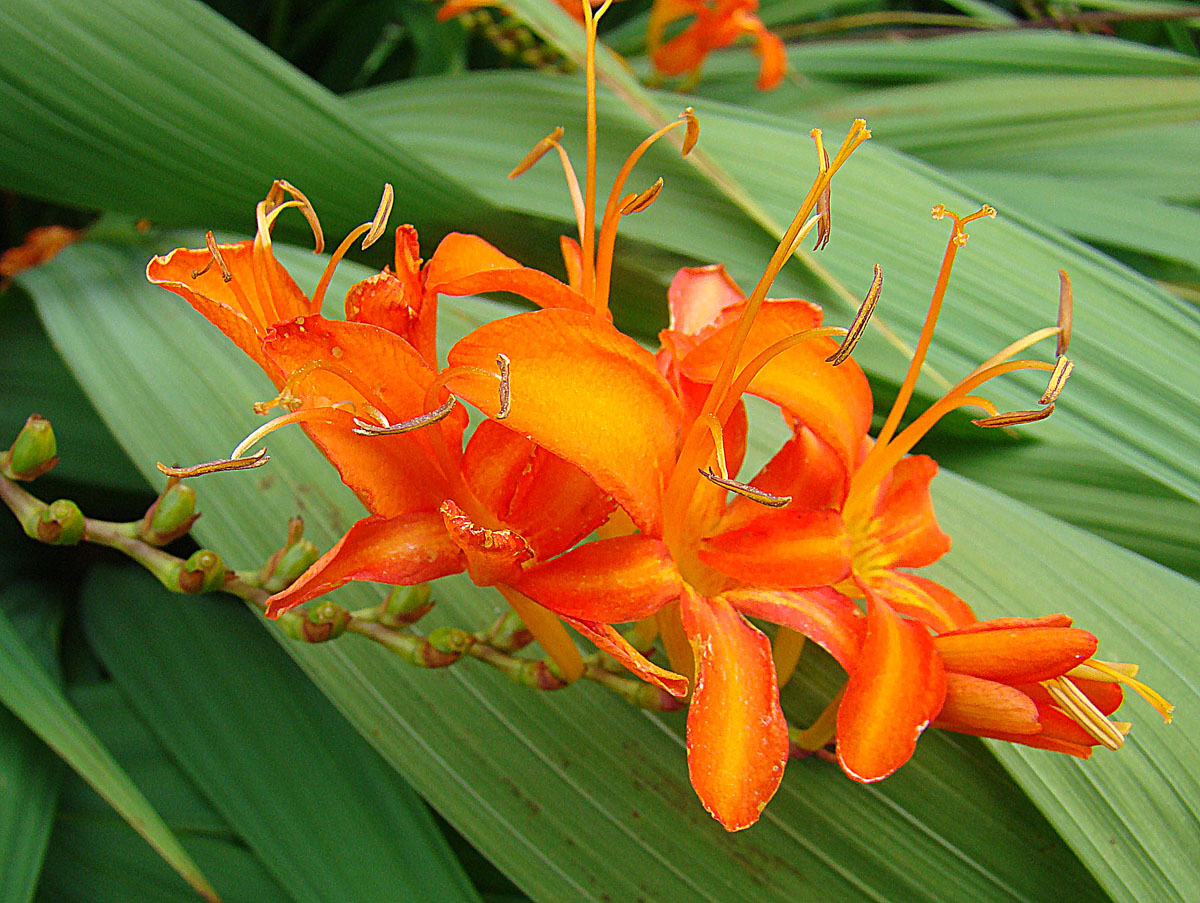
