= Nonesis Nek Pass =

Mountain pass in South Africa

Coordinates: 31°50′29.6″S 26°59′17.7″E

Nonesis Nek Pass is a mountain pass in the Eastern Cape province of South Africa. It lies on the regional road R396 between Lady Frere and Queenstown. It takes its name from the Thembu leader Nonesi, widow of Ngubengcuka, who served as queen regent of the tribe after her husband's death.
