= Penhoek Pass =

Mountain pass in Eastern Cape, South Africa

Coordinates: 31°27′45.3″S 26°42′05.2″E

Penhoek Pass is a mountain pass situated in the Stormberg Mountains of the Eastern Cape province of South Africa. It lies about 60 km north of Queenstown on the national road N6 to Jamestown and Aliwal North.

The road through the pass was constructed in 1892. However, it was abandoned for much of the earlier 20th century, until being rebuilt as part of the N6 national road in the 1950s. It reaches a height of 1 844 m above sea level and has a maximum gradient of 1:10.
