= Kumajaba Pass =

The Kumajaba Pass is situated in the Eastern Cape province of South Africa, near the small town of Maclear.

It stretches over 9 km (5.6 mi) and rises by 562 metres (1,844 ft) in elevation at an average gradient of 1:16. Its coordinates are 31°17′02.2″S 28°32′08.6″E
