= Dontsa Pass =

Coordinates: 32°36′47.3″S 27°14′37.4″E

Dontsa Pass, Is situated in the Eastern Cape, province of South Africa, on the regional road R352, between Keiskammahoek and Stutterheim.
