= N6 (South Africa) =

National road in South Africa

National route N6

- Map of the N6 route

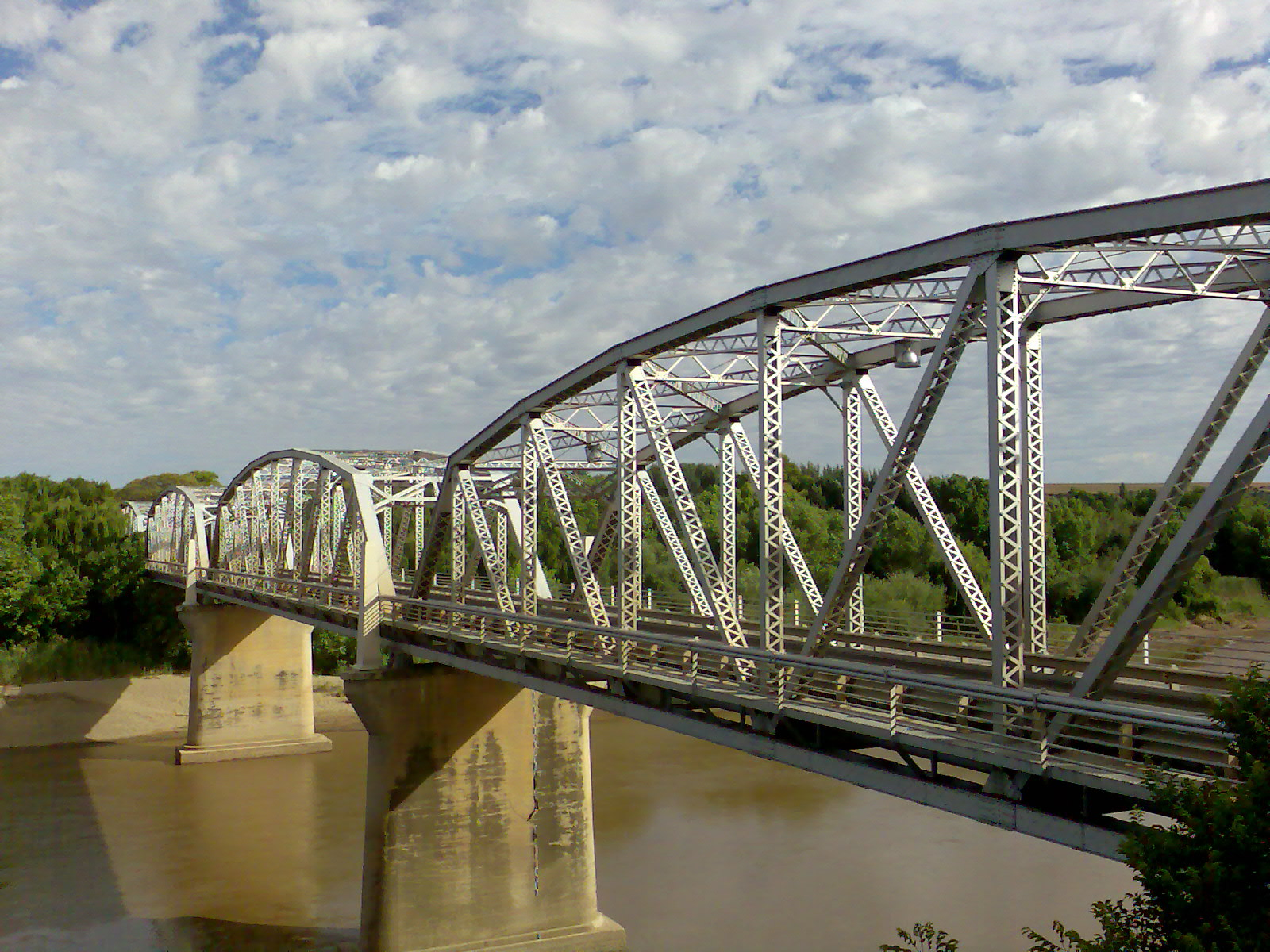
- The N6 crosses the Orange River on the Generaal Hertzog Bridge at Maletswai

Route information
- Maintained by SANRAL
- Length: 538 km (334 mi)

Major junctions
- South end: N2 in East London
- North end: N1 near Bloemfontein

Location
- Country: South Africa
- Provinces: Eastern Cape, Free State
- Major cities: East London; Stutterheim; Cathcart; Komani; Jamestown; Aliwal North; Rouxville; Smithfield; Reddersburg; Bloemfontein

Highway system
- Numbered routes of South Africa
← N5	→ N7

The N6 is a national route in South Africa that connects East London with Bloemfontein, via Komani and Maletswai. It runs roughly from north to south, connecting the N1 with the N2.

== Route ==
Detailed Route

=== Eastern Cape ===
The N6 begins in the city of East London in the Buffalo City Metropolitan Municipality of the Eastern Cape Province, next to the Nahoon River, at an interchange with the N2 highway. South of the highway, it is the R72 road towards the East London CBD.

It begins by going northwest from the N2 interchange for 31 kilometres to the town of Macleantown, where it leaves the Buffalo City Metropolitan Municipality. It continues northwest for another 21 kilometres to meet the R63 road at an intersection just north-east of Kei Road.

It continues northwest for 19 kilometers to the town of Stutterheim. It proceeds northwest for another 47 kilometers to the town of Cathcart. It proceeds north-north-west for 54 kilometres, crossing the Black Kei River, to reach Queenstown (renamed Komani in February 2016).

14 kilometers before Komani, the R61 meets the N6 and they are one road into the town of Komani as Louis Botha Road and Cathcart Street. In the Stuttaford suburb of Komani, the R61 becomes its own road westwards at the roundabout junction with Barrable Street.

The N6 continues northwards for 162 kilometres as the Penhoek Pass, bypassing Sterkstroom, meeting the R56 and passing through Jamestown (renamed James Calata in 2015), to the town of Aliwal North (renamed Maletswai in 2016), where it meets the R58. At the junction with Barkly Street in Maletswai, the N6 makes a left turn and proceeds to cross the Orange River into the Free State as the General Hertzog Bridge.

=== Free State ===
From the Orange River crossing at Maletswai, the N6 goes north-north-east for 34 kilometres to the town of Rouxville, where it meets the southern terminus of the R26. It turns to the north-west and continues for 37 kilometres, crossing the Caledon River, to the town of Smithfield, where the R701 joins it in the southern suburbs before they split in the northern suburbs.

From Smithfield, the N6 continues north-north-west for 70 kilometres to the town of Reddersburg, where it is joined by the R717 from Edenburg in the southern suburbs before they split in the central area. From Reddersburg, the N6 makes a direct line for Bloemfontein, going northwards for 49 kilometres to reach a four-way junction south-west of the Bloemfontein suburb of Mangaung (which is also the name of the Metropolitan Municipality in which the city is located). As the road northwards from this junction is the M30 metropolitan route towards the Mangaung suburb and Bloemfontein Central, the N6 becomes the road westwards and proceeds to end at the next junction, which is an interchange with the N1 highway (Bloemfontein Western Bypass).

== History ==
Prior to 1970, the N6 began from King William's Town in the Buffalo City Metropolitan Municipality and proceeded through Stutterheim. Today, the road from King William's Town to Stutterheim is designated as the R346 road. Also, the N6 used to end at its current junction with the R717 south of the Reddersburg Town Centre, as the R717 from Edenburg to Reddersburg, together with the N6 from Reddersburg to Bloemfontein, formed part of the N1 national route.

== Junctions ==
=== Eastern Cape ===
Municipality	Location	km	mi	Exit	Destinations	Notes
Buffalo City	East London	0	0	(1049)	N2, R72 North East Expressway, East London	
Buffalo City	East London	2	1	—	R102 Bonza Bay Road, Beacon Bay, Gonubie	At-grade traffic circle
Amahlathi	Kei Road	52	32	—	R63, Kei Road, Bhisho, Komga	Quadrant interchange
Amahlathi	Stutterheim	71	44	—	R346, Qonce, East London	At-grade intersection
Amahlathi	Stutterheim	72	45	—	R352 Hill Street, Keiskammahoek, Dimbaza	At-grade intersection
Amahlathi	Cathcart	120	75	—	R345, Hogsback, KwaMaqoma	At-grade intersection
Amahlathi	Cathcart	121	75	—	R351 east, Bolotwa	At-grade intersection; Southern end of concurrency with R351
Amahlathi	Cathcart	126	78	—	R351 west, Whittlesea	At-grade intersection; Northern end of concurrency with R351
Enoch Mgijima	Queenstown	162	101	—	R61 east, Cofimvaba, Mthatha	At-grade intersection; Southern end of concurrency with R61
Enoch Mgijima	Queenstown	179	111	—	R392 Griffith Street, Dordrecht, Cacadu	At-grade intersection
Enoch Mgijima	Queenstown	180	112	—	R61 west, Tarkastad, Nxuba	At-grade traffic circle; Northern end of concurrency with R61
Enoch Mgijima	Sterkstroom	221	137	—	R397, Sterkstroom	At-grade intersection
Enoch Mgijima	Sterkstroom	230	143	—	R344, Sterkstroom, Dordrecht	At-grade intersection
Walter Sisulu	Jamestown	253	157	—	R56, Dordrecht, Molteno	Quadrant interchange
Walter Sisulu	Jamestown	294	183	—	R344, Lady Grey	At-grade intersection
Walter Sisulu	Aliwal North	343	213	—	R58 Young Street east, Lady Grey, Barkly East	At-grade intersection
Walter Sisulu	Aliwal North	343	213	—	R58 Grey Street west, Burgersdorp	At-grade intersection
N6 continues into the Free State

=== Free State ===
Municipality	Location	km	mi	Exit	Destinations	Notes
Mohokare	Rouxville	378	235	—	R26, Zastron	At-grade intersection
Mohokare	Smithfield	414	257	—	R701 west, Bethulie	At-grade intersection; Southern end of concurrency with R701
Mohokare	Smithfield	417	259	—	R701 east, Wepener	At-grade intersection; Northern end of concurrency with R701
Kopanong	Reddersburg	488	303	—	R717 west, Edenburg	At-grade intersection; Southern end of concurrency with R717
Kopanong	Reddersburg	489	304	—	R717 Oranje Street east, Dewetsdorp	At-grade intersection; Northern end of concurrency with R717
Mangaung	Bloemfontein	538	334	—	M30 Oliver Tambo Road, Bloemfontein Ring Road, Mangaung	At-grade intersection
Mangaung	Bloemfontein	538	334	(177)	N1, Kroonstad, Colesberg	
N6 ends
