= Kwaaiman Pass =

Coordinates: 31°43′31.2″S 27°41′44.0″E

Kwaaiman Pass (English: Angry Man) is situated in the Eastern Cape province of South Africa, on the road between Cala, Eastern Cape and Tsomo.
