= Red Hill Pass (Eastern Cape pass) =

Place in South Africa

Coordinates: 32°42′41.7″S 27°11′00.9″E

Red Hill Pass, is situated in the Eastern Cape, province of South Africa, on the regional road R352, between Keiskammahoek and King Williams Town.

A monument was placed at the foot of the pass in 1860 by the 53rd (Shropshire) Regiment of Foot.
