= Moordenaarsnek =

Mountain pass in South Africa

Coordinates: 30°50′22.9″S 28°32′38.5″E

Moordenaarsnek Pass, or just Moordenaarsnek (English: Murderer's Neck), is situated in the Eastern Cape, province of South Africa, on the regional road R56, between Mount Fletcher and Maclear. According to tradition it takes its name from the killing of the British magistrate Hamilton Hope during an 1880 AmaMpondomise uprising while he was attempting to reach Maclear.
