= Smuts Pass =

Coordinates: 31°24′25.3″S 26°47′31.1″E

Smuts Pass is a mountain pass situated in the Eastern Cape province of South Africa, on the road between Dordrecht, Eastern Cape and Molteno.
