= Jamestown Hospital =

- Eastern Cape Department of Health

Geography
- Location: Jamestown, Joe Gqabi District Municipality, Eastern Cape, South Africa
- Coordinates: 31°07′25″S 26°48′27″E

Organisation
- Care system: Public
- Type: Community

Services
- Emergency department: Yes
- Beds: 10

Links
- Website: Eastern Cape Department of Health website - Joe Gqabi District Hospitals
- Other links: List of hospitals in South Africa

Jamestown Hospital is a small Provincial government funded hospital in Jamestown, Eastern Cape in South Africa. It used to be a (private) Provincially Aided Hospital.

The hospital departments include Emergency department, Out Patients Department, Paediatric ward, Maternity ward, Surgical Services, Medical Services, Operating Theatre & Central Sterile Services Department Services, Pharmacy, Anti-Retroviral (ARV) treatment for HIV/AIDS, Post Trauma Counseling Services, Laundry Services, Kitchen Services and Mortuary.
