= Macleantown =

- Location within Eastern Cape Location within South Africa
- Coordinates: 32.790°S 27.744°E
- Country: South Africa
- Province: Eastern Cape
- Municipality: Buffalo City

Area
  - Total: 9.94 km^{2} (3.84 sq mi)

Population (2011)
  - Total: 580
  - Density: 58/km^{2} (150/sq mi)

Racial makeup (2011)
  - Black African: 85.5%
  - Coloured: 0.3%
  - Indian/Asian: 0.3%
  - White: 13.6%
  - Other: 0.2%

First languages (2011)
  - Xhosa: 77.6%
  - English: 15.2%
  - Afrikaans: 4.3%
  - Other: 2.9%
- Time zone: UTC+2 (SAST)
- PO box: 5280
- Area code: 043

Macleantown is a town in Buffalo City in the Eastern Cape province of South Africa.

Village 34 km north-west of East London and 46 km south-east of Stutterheim on the N6 road. Named in April 1881 after Colonel John Maclean (1810-1874), Chief Commissioner of British Caffraria from 1852 and Lieutenant-Governor of that territory from March 1860 to December 1864.
