= Binx =

South African singer and musician

- Born: Elliot, South Africa
- Genres: Pop; Rock; Electronic
- Occupations: Singer; Songwriter; Model; Actress
- Instruments: Vocals; Guitar; Piano; Djembe
- Website: binxofficial.com

Binx is a South African singer and musician.

Her debut EP, The African Bee, was well-received by critics.

== Life ==
Binx was born Bianca Carmen Buys in Elliot, South Africa, in 1992, and moved to East London, South Africa with her family in 2002. After being discovered by a Sony Music scout, she moved to Manhattan, New York in 2012.
