= Dutch Reformed Church, Barkly East =

Church in Barkly East, South Africa

Coordinates: 30°58′01″S 27°35′35″E

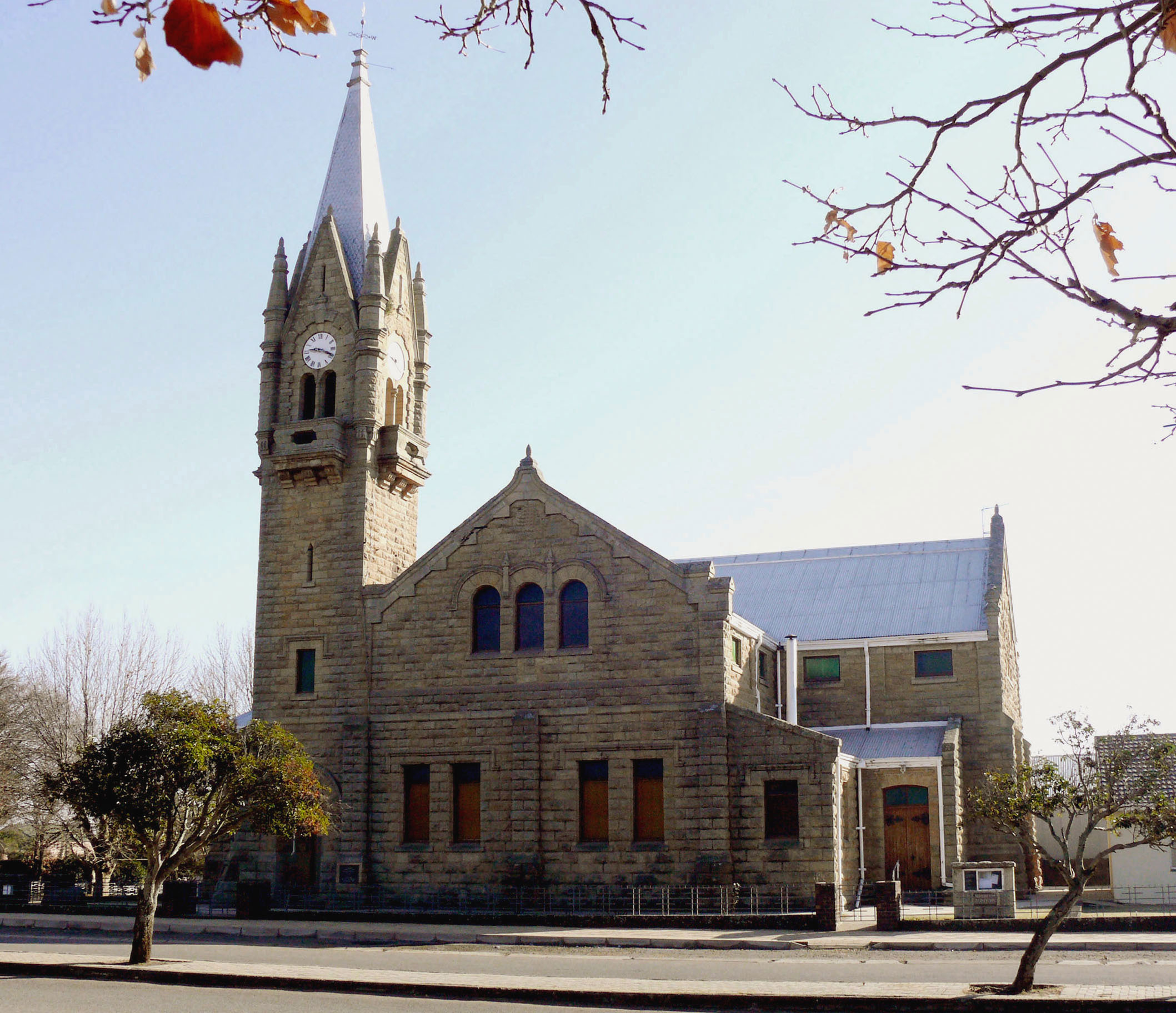

The Dutch Reformed Church in Barkly East is the 72nd-oldest congregation of the Dutch Reformed Church in what was the Cape Church for more than a century and a half, before the establishment of the Synods of Western and Southern Cape, Eastern Cape and Northern Cape in the middle of the decade after 1970 and beyond. It was indeed the 76th congregation to be founded, but four congregations that were older than Barkly East have since been incorporated into neighboring congregations, namely Middelburg (1852, no. 41), Komga (1859, no. 63), Greykerk (1862, no. 65) and Alice (1862, no. 66), all in the present NG Church in the Eastern Cape. In 2016, the congregation had 263 professing and 90 baptized members. Besides the main church on Barkly East, the village of Rhodes is also a ministry point of the congregation.

== Ministers ==
- Carl Hendrik Radloff, 1880–1886
- G.S. Malan, 1886–1887
- Helgard Müller, 1887–1894
- F.W.R. Cast, 1894–1927
- Gert Johannes Barnard, 7 December 1928 – 3 August 1946 (died in office)
- Jacobus Andries Theron, 1947–1957
- Johan Gregorius Bezuidenhoud, 1958–1962
- Cillié Malan, 1962–1966
- Johannes Ströhmenger Berry, 1966–1970
- Errol Viljoen, 1970–1975
- Floris Nicolaas Marais, 1976–1980
- Johannes Jurie van Deventer, 1980–1985
- Willem Abraham van Zyl, 1985–2005
- Johannes Gysbertus Marthinus (Jannie) Richter, 2006–2016
