= Barkly Pass =

Mountain pass in the Eastern Cape, South Africa

- Elevation: 2,018 m (6,621 ft)
- Traversed by: R58

Third Approach
- Location: Eastern Cape, South Africa
- Range: Drakensberg Mountains
- Coordinates: 31°14′8.4″S 27°50′30.8″E

Barkly Pass is situated in the high mountains of the Eastern Cape, South Africa, on the Regional R58 tarred road between Elliot and Barkly East.

== History ==
The pass is named after Henry Barkly, governor of the Cape. It was constructed in 1885.

== Route ==
The pass starts a few kilometres outside Elliot at 1,473 m (4,833 ft) above sea level and ascends moderately steep at a gradient of 1:22 attaining an elevation gain of 626 m (2,054 ft) in a distance of 12 km (7.5 mi). After a few sharp hairpin bends it reaches an elevation of 2,018 m (6,621 ft) at the summit. The pass is subject to frequent winter snow closures.
