= Colonanek =

Coordinates: 30°38′46.5″S 29°02′52.9″E

Colonanek Pass (English: Colona is a name, nek is neck) is situated in the Eastern Cape province of South Africa on the road between Mount Frere and Cedarville.
