= Fuller's Hoek Pass =

Coordinates: 32°41′18.4″S 26°31′10.1″E

Fuller's Hoek Pass, (English: Fuller's Corner), is situated in the Eastern Cape, province of South Africa, on a road in the Fort Fordyce Nature Reserve.
