= Cala Pass =

Mountain pass in Eastern Cape, South Africa

Coordinates: 31°28′25.2″S 27°43′24.3″E

Cala Pass is a high-altitude mountain pass situated in the Eastern Cape province of South Africa, on the R410 Regional road between Elliot and Cala.

It is one of four passes between Queenstown and Elliot and has a gradient of 1:19, in places 1:9; the altitude differential is almost 300 metres (980 ft) over 5.8 kilometres (3.6 mi).
