= Bulhoek Pass =

Coordinates: 31°14′22.2″S 25°42′23.5″E

Bulhoek Pass, (English: Bull Corner), is situated in the Eastern Cape, province of South Africa near Steynsburg.
