= Bidstone Pass =

Coordinates: 30.71500°S 27.83067°E

- Volunteershoek Pass
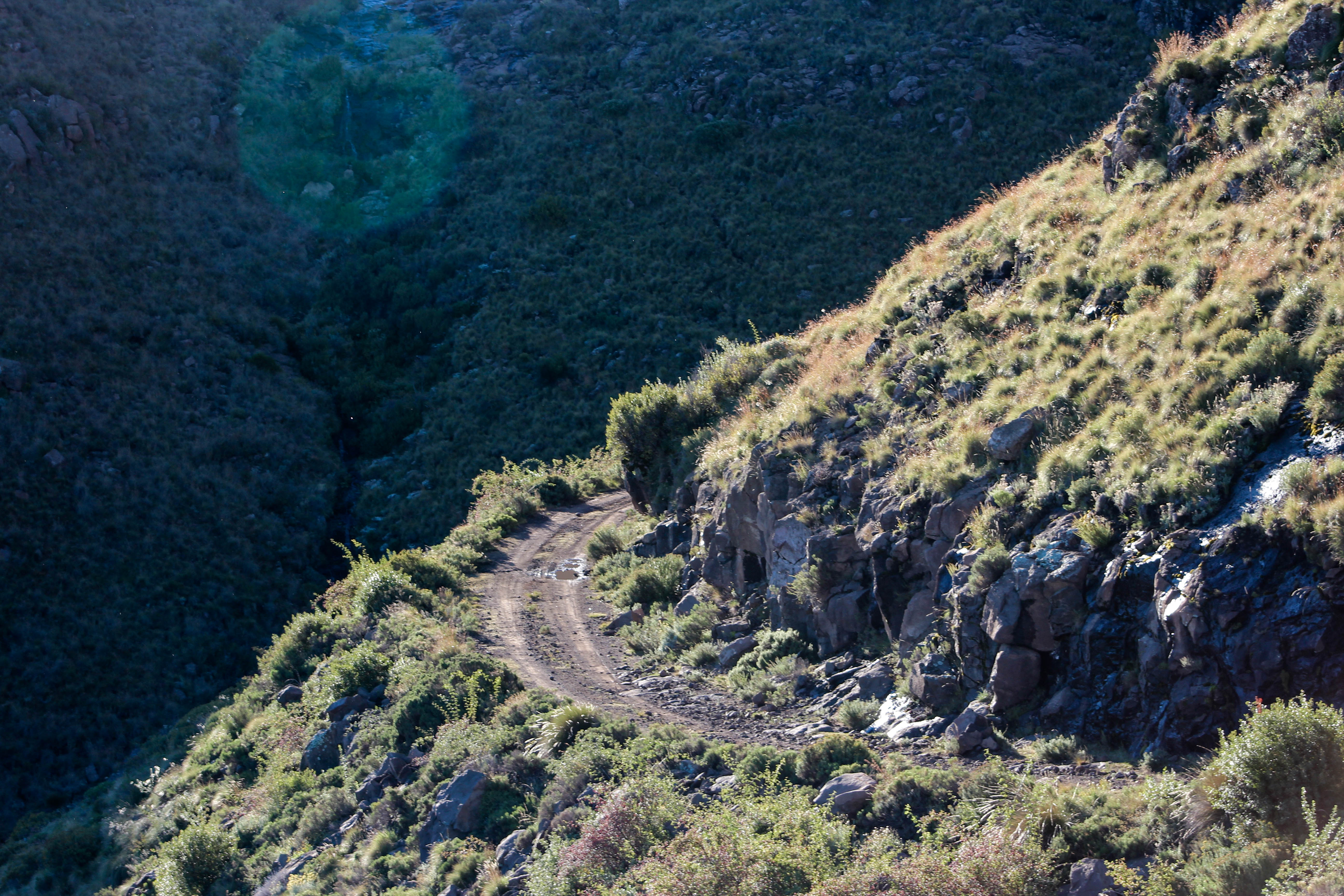
- Nearing the top of Bidstone Pass

- Location within South Africa

Third Approach
- Location: Eastern Cape, South Africa

Bidston Pass or Volunteershoek Pass is a scenic, but very steep and gravel, route situated in the Eastern Cape, South Africa.

== Geography ==
The pass is situated near Tiffindell Ski Resort on the route from Rhodes. Bidstone pass is 3.9 km long and rises from 1917m to 2382m.
