= Helspoort Pass =

Mountain pass in Eastern Cape, South Africa

Coordinates: 33°10′12.3″S 26°19′15.1″E

Helspoort Pass or Hells Poort is a mountain pass situated in the Eastern Cape province of South Africa, on the regional road R350, northwest of Grahamstown. It is situated between Grahamstown and Bedford, Eastern Cape.

The name, meaning "Hell's gate" in Afrikaans, is one of several Afrikaans placenames referring to Hell or the Devil.
