= Pefferskop Pass =

Coordinates: 32°39′00.5″S 26°52′57.6″E

Pefferskop Pass is situated in the Eastern Cape province of South Africa, on the road between Seymour, Eastern Cape and Dimfield, Eastern Cape.
