= Tarka Pass =

Mountain pass in South Africa

Coordinates: 32°28′18.8″S 25°39′59.6″E

Tarka Pass, is situated in the Eastern Cape province of South Africa, on the road between Cradock, Eastern Cape and Somerset East.
