= Gatberg =

South African mountain

Coordinates: 29.04445275857008°S 29.333501595805277°E

Gatberg is a mountain located in KwaZulu-Natal, South Africa, with a height of 2,561 meters above sea level.

Gatberg is situated at coordinates 29°3'0" S and 29°19'60" E in the region of KwaZulu-Natal. The mountain's height and location make it a notable geographical feature in the area.

Gatberg serves as a destination for hikers, offering a challenging yet rewarding hiking experience.
