= R397 (South Africa) =

Regional route in South Africa

Regional route R397
- R397 route map

Location
- Country: South Africa

Highway system
- Numbered routes of South Africa
← R396	→ R398

The R397 is a Regional Route in South Africa that connects Burgersdorp with Molteno and Sterkstroom. Its northern terminus is the R391 near Burgersdorp. It heads south to meet the R56. It becomes cosigned, heading east-south-east, through Molteno. East of Molteno, it leaves the R56, heading south-east, via the Boesmanshoek pass, to Sterkstroom, where it meets and is briefly cosigned with the R344. Its southern terminus is the N6.
