= Ghwarriepoort =

Mountain pass in Eastern Cape, South Africa

Coordinates: 33°23′17.3″S 23°23′30.3″E

Ghwarriepoort (English: Gate of guarri) is a mountain pass situated in the Eastern Cape, province of South Africa. It located on the national road N9, between Uniondale and Williston. It is about 10 km south of Willowmore. The pass was first paved in 1963. Other names of the pass include Suurberg Poort and Dagcloov, from the Khoekhoe Quanti ("day gorge").

The "Ghwarriepoort" name is one of several early Cape place names that combined a Khoekhoe specific term with an Afrikaans generic term. "Ghwarrie" or guarri refers to the medicinal plant Euclea undulata.
