= Witnek Pass =

Mountain pass in South Africa

Coordinates: 31°52′52.0″S 24°41′43.4″E

Witnek Pass (English: White Neck) is situated in the Eastern Cape, province of South Africa, on the road between Nieu-Bethesda and Cradock, Eastern Cape.

The pass was the site of a battle in the Second Boer War between a British flying column under Colonel Edward Ingouville-Williams and a Boer guerilla force controlling the heights.
