= Potter's Pass =

Mountain pass in Eastern Cape, South Africa

Coordinates: 33°02′26.1″S 27°52′10.2″E

Potter's Pass, is situated in the Eastern Cape, province of South Africa, near East London. It is on the East London Grand Prix Circuit and is known for having one of the fastest and most challenging curves in South African motorsport.
