= Buffelshoek Pass =

Coordinates: 32°29′11.1″S 25°14′02.3″E

Buffelshoek Pass (English: Buffalo's Corner) is situated in the Eastern Cape, province of South Africa on the Regional road R337 (Eastern Cape), between Pearston and Cradock.
