= Ugie, South Africa =

Ugie
- Location within Eastern Cape Location within South Africa
- Coordinates: 31.2°S 28.25°E
- Country: South Africa
- Province: Eastern Cape
- District: Joe Gqabi
- Municipality: Elundini

Area
  - Total: 19.11 km^{2} (7.38 sq mi)

Population (2011)
  - Total: 13,467
  - Density: 704.7/km^{2} (1,825/sq mi)

Racial makeup (2011)
  - Black African: 94.3%
  - Coloured: 2.7%
  - Indian/Asian: 0.3%
  - White: 2.6%
  - Other: 0.2%

First languages (2011)
  - Xhosa: 89.3%
  - Afrikaans: 4.6%
  - English: 2.3%
  - Sotho: 1.7%
  - Other: 2.1%
- Time zone: UTC+2 (SAST)
- Postal code (street): 5470
- PO box: 5470
- Area code: +27 (0)45

Ugie is a town in Joe Gqabi District Municipality in the Eastern Cape province of South Africa.

Town at the southern foot of the Drakensberg, 18 km south-west of Maclear. It developed from a mission station at Gatberg, established in 1863 by William Murray and named Ugie by him, after the Ugie River in Scotland, where he was born. The town was founded in 1885, and in 1916 a village management board was instituted.
