= Nuwekloof Pass (Eastern Cape) =

Coordinates: 33°30′57.5″S 23°38′45.7″E

Nuwekloof Pass, is situated in the Eastern Cape, a province of South Africa, on the regional road R332, at the Baviaanskloof.
