= Mazeppa Bay =

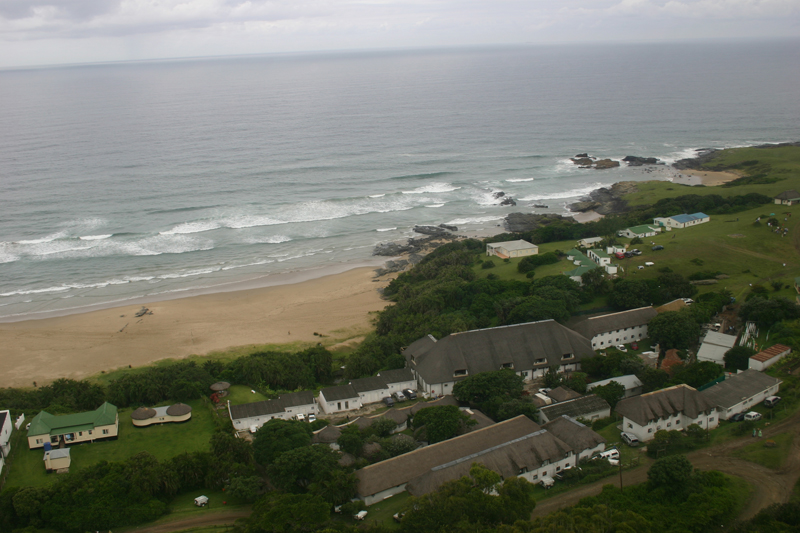
- Mazeppa Bay

- Location within Eastern Cape Location within South Africa
- Coordinates: 32.478°S 28.651°E
- Country: South Africa
- Province: Eastern Cape
- District: Amathole
- Municipality: Mnquma

Area
  - Total: 1.03 km^{2} (0.40 sq mi)

Population (2011)
  - Total: 111
  - Density: 108/km^{2} (279/sq mi)

Racial makeup (2011)
  - Black African: 57.7%
  - Coloured: 1.8%
  - White: 36.0%
  - Other: 4.5%

First languages (2011)
  - Xhosa: 56.0%
  - English: 28.0%
  - Afrikaans: 14.0%
  - Tswana: 2.0%
- Time zone: UTC+2 (SAST)
- PO box: 4960

Mazeppa Bay is a town in Amathole District Municipality in the Eastern Cape province of South Africa.

Mazeppa Bay is a holiday resort on the Wild Coast, 175 km north-east of East London. The name Mazeppa comes from the schooner Mazeppa, which took the surviving Voortrekkers of Louis Trichardt's party from Delagoa Bay to Port Natal in 1839. The schooner in turn was named after the Ukrainian patriot Ivan Mazeppa (1639–1709). After the publication of Byron’s poem Mazeppa in May 1819 it became common to name boats Mazeppa as a symbol of speed.

Mazeppa Bay is known for its fishing and was featured in episode three of the first season of Extreme Fishing with Robson Green.
