= Lady Grey, South Africa =

Lady Grey
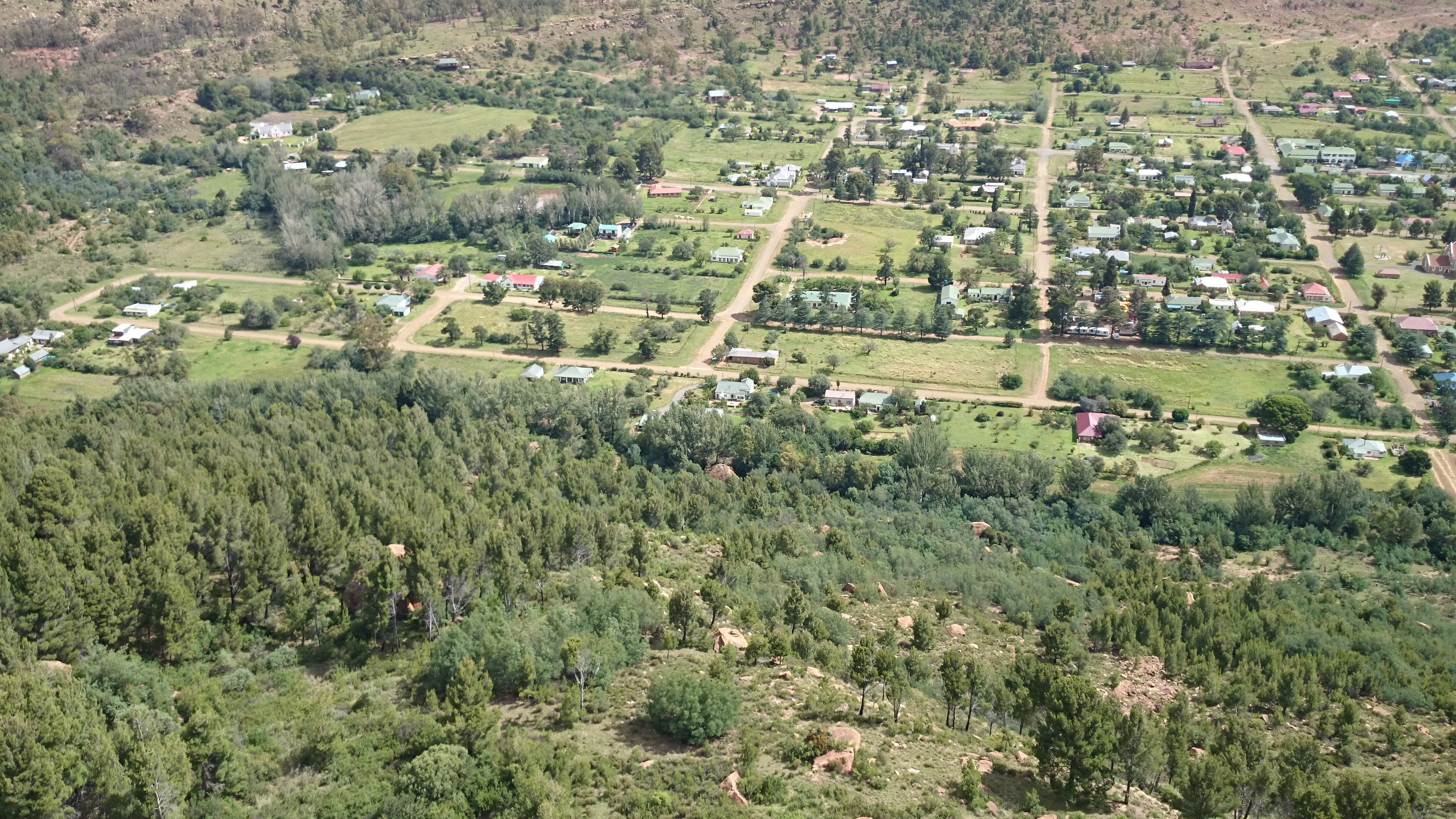
- Lady Grey

- Location within Eastern Cape Location within South Africa
- Coordinates: 30°42′35″S 27°12′52″E
- Country: South Africa
- Province: Eastern Cape
- District: Joe Gqabi
- Municipality: Senqu
- Established: 1857

Area
  - Total: 25.1 km^{2} (9.7 sq mi)
- Elevation: 1,658 m (5,440 ft)

Population (2011)
  - Total: 7,023
  - Density: 280/km^{2} (725/sq mi)

Racial makeup (2011)
  - Black African: 85.7%
  - Coloured: 10.3%
  - Indian/Asian: 0.2%
  - White: 3.5%
  - Other: 0.3%

First languages (2011)
  - Xhosa: 53.0%
  - Sotho: 29.6%
  - Afrikaans: 13.6%
  - English: 1.8%
  - Other: 1.9%
- Time zone: UTC+2 (SAST)
- Postal code (street): 9755
- PO box: 9755
- Area code: 051 (-603-)

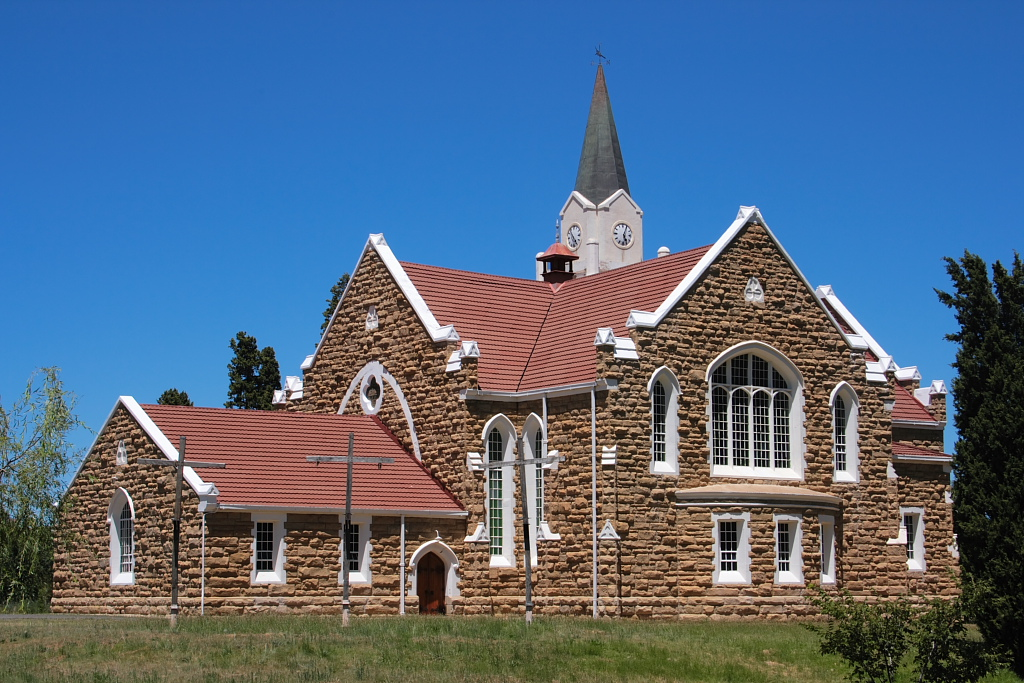
Lady Grey Church, Eastern Cape.

Lady Grey is a rural village in the North of the Eastern Cape in South Africa near the border with Lesotho. It is situated in the foothills of the Witteberg mountains, 54 km (34 mi) due east of Aliwal North on the R58 road and 260 km (160 mi) from the capital of the Free State Province, Bloemfontein.

== History ==
Lady Grey was established on the farm Waaihoek, purchased by the Dutch Reformed Church of Aliwal North on 30 April 1857 for the purpose of founding a new congregation. It was named in honour of Eliza Lucy Grey (née Spencer), daughter of Sir Richard Spencer, and wife of Sir George Grey the Cape governor. The first municipality of Lady Grey was proclaimed in 1893. Currently, Senqu Local Municipality has its seat in Lady Grey.

== Tourism ==
Tucked away in a valley below the Witteberg mountains, Lady Grey is a tranquil, rural village founded in 1858. Surrounded by soaring mountains and gentle streams, a number of country cottages provide a retreat for the weary traveller. Old buildings have been restored to attract tourists and relocators.

Lady Grey attracts nature lovers, bird watchers, hikers, star gazers and fly fishing enthusiasts. Wild trout and yellowfish are found in abundance in the streams and rivers in the area. Visitors wishing to fish here are advised to obtain a permit from the local fly fishing association, especially for fishing on private property, through which most of the streams flow.

== Arts Academy ==
The well-known Lady Grey Arts Academy is an exceptional combined Primary and Secondary school for pupils wanting to further their education in the performing and visual arts as well as in music. Regular shows, like the passion play during Easter, as well as Christmas plays are performed, and art exhibitions are being held by the school in Lady Grey.

== Notable people from Lady Grey ==
- Alwyn Schlebusch – only holder of the title Vice State President of South Africa (1 January 1981 - 14 September 1984), was born in Lady Grey in 1917.
