= Jamestown, Eastern Cape =

Jamestown
- James Calata
- Location within Eastern Cape Location within South Africa Location within Africa
- Coordinates: 31°07′17″S 26°48′24″E
- Country: South Africa
- Province: Eastern Cape
- District: Joe Gqabi
- Municipality: Walter Sisulu
- Established: 1874

Area
  - Total: 11.98 km^{2} (4.63 sq mi)

Population (2011)
  - Total: 4,666
  - Density: 389.5/km^{2} (1,009/sq mi)

Racial makeup (2011)
  - Black African: 96.0%
  - Coloured: 1.9%
  - Indian/Asian: 0.3%
  - White: 1.1%
  - Other: 0.6%

First languages (2011)
  - Xhosa: 92.7%
  - Afrikaans: 2.2%
  - English: 1.6%
  - Sotho: 1.4%
  - Other: 2.1%
- Time zone: UTC+2 (SAST)
- Postal code (street): 9742
- PO box: 9742
- Area code: 051

Jamestown, officially James Calata, is a town on the N6 national road 58 km south of Aliwal North and 105 km north of Komani in the Joe Gqabi District Municipality of the Eastern Cape, South Africa. It is at the centre of a fertile sheep, cattle and wheat-farming area and was the terminus of a branch railway line from Molteno. It was named after James Wagenaar, original owner of the farm on which the town was laid out.

The Jamestown Hospital, which was previously provincially aided, has since January 2011 been fully operated by the Eastern Cape Department of Health.

There are two public schools: Phambili Mzontsundu Senior Secondary School which is situated in town, and Phahameng Primary School which is situated in Masakhane Township. Next to Siyanda Nonkala's home

== Notable people associated with Jamestown ==
- Prime Minister John Vorster was born and raised in Jamestown
- Alexander James Kidwell, referred to as the "Father of Jamestown", a merchant, Special Justice of the Peace, and Methodist preacher. The sandstone Kidwell Memorial Church in the main street was named in his memory, as is the adjacent Kidwell Street. His grandparents – Alexander Kidwell and Phebe Tubb – were 1820 settlers.
- H. B. Thom – Rector and later Chancellor of Stellenbosch University, born in Jamestown.
- Hennie Aucamp – Afrikaans poet, writer, cabaretist and academic, educated and matriculated in Jamestown.
