= R352 (South Africa) =

Regional route in South Africa

Regional route R352
- R352 route map

Route information
- Length: 150 km (93 mi)

Major junctions
- North-east end: R409 at Tsomo
- N6 at Stutterheim
- South-west end: R63 at Dimbaza

Location
- Country: South Africa
- Towns: Keiskammahoek, Stutterheim

Highway system
- Numbered routes of South Africa
← R351	→ R353

The R352 is a Regional Route in South Africa that connects Dimbaza with Tsomo via Stutterheim.

Its south-western terminus is a junction with the R63 at Dimbaza. From there, it heads north to Keiskammahoek. The route then heads east-north-east to Stutterheim, where it crosses the N6. It then runs north-east to cross the Great Kei River at the Gaikaford Bridge and reach Tsomo, where it ends at a junction with the R409.
