= Tsomo =

- Location within Eastern Cape Location within South Africa
- Coordinates: 32.03794°S 27.81689°E
- Country: South Africa
- Province: Eastern Cape
- District: Chris Hani
- Municipality: Intsika Yethu
- Established: 1877

Area
  - Total: 3.72 km^{2} (1.44 sq mi)

Population (2011)
  - Total: 2,108
  - Density: 567/km^{2} (1,470/sq mi)

Racial makeup (2011)
  - Black African: 94.8%
  - Coloured: 2.1%
  - Indian/Asian: 1.7%
  - White: 1.3%

First languages (2011)
  - Xhosa: 88.7%
  - English: 3.1%
  - Afrikaans: 1.1%
  - Other: 7.0%
- Time zone: UTC+2 (SAST)
- PO box: 5400
- Area code: 047

Tsomo is a town in Chris Hani District Municipality in the Eastern Cape province of South Africa. The town is 45 km east of Qamata and 48 km west of Ndabakazi.

== History ==
Founded in 1877, it originated as a military station known as Tsomo Post. The name is derived from that of the Tsomo River, on which it is situated, which in turn is said to be named after a Xhosa chief who lived where the bridge now stands.

Tsomo was originally included in the Transkei territory of Fingoland (Mfenguland) however after the annexation by the British Fingoland was further divided into Butterworth, Tsomo and Nqamakwe.

== Notable people ==
- Vuyisile Mini
- Albertina Sisulu
- Brenda Ngxoli
- Hammer Gcingca
- Andile Lungisa
- Burning Ntlemeza
