= Maclear, South Africa =

Maclear Nqanqarhu
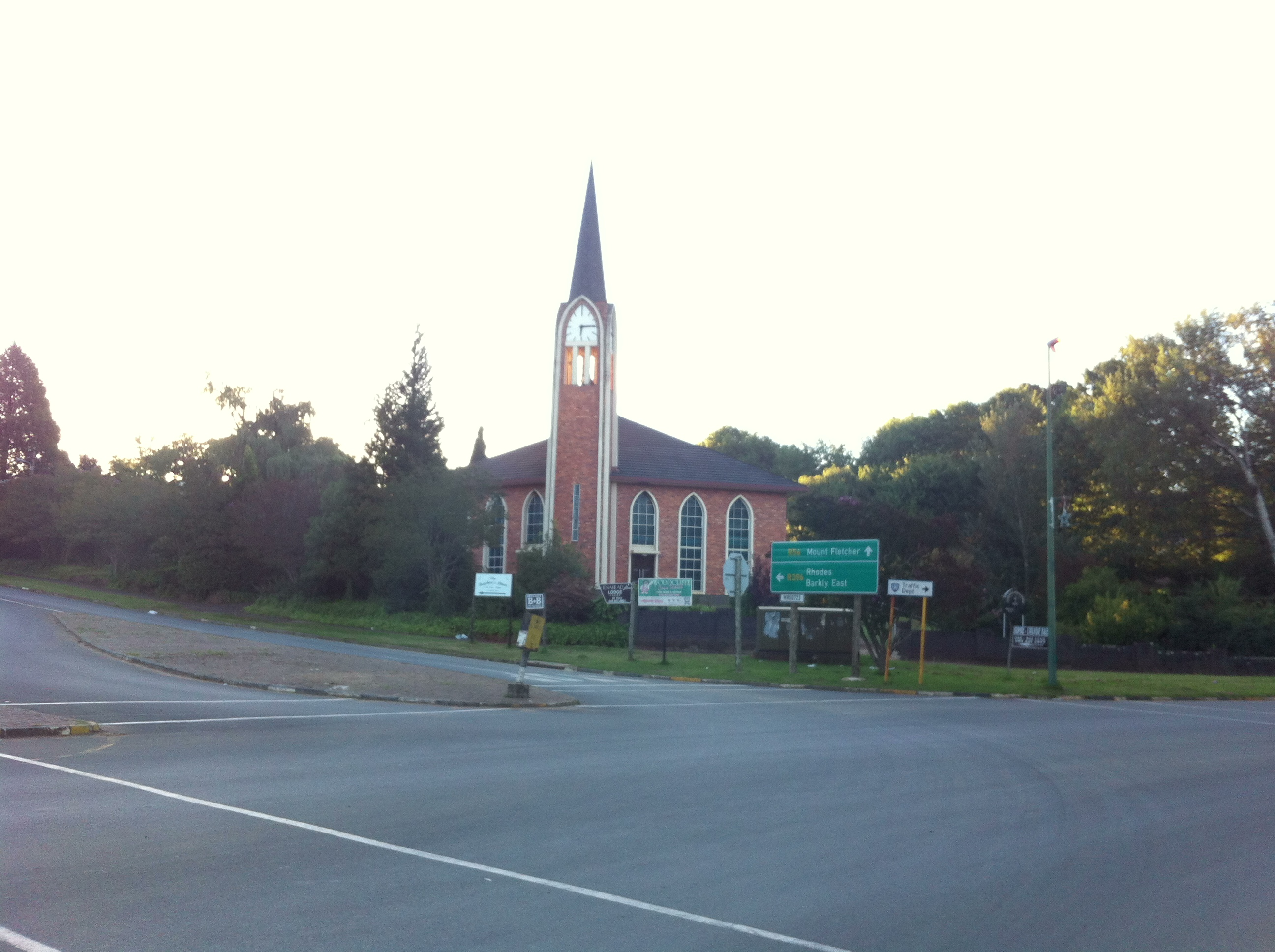
- Main street in Maclear

- Location within Eastern Cape Location within South Africa Location within Africa
- Coordinates: 31°04′12″S 28°21′0″E
- Country: South Africa
- Province: Eastern Cape
- District: Joe Gqabi
- Municipality: Elundini

Area
  - Total: 9.2 km^{2} (3.6 sq mi)
- Elevation: 1,272 m (4,173 ft)

Population (2011)
  - Total: 10,521
  - Density: 1,100/km^{2} (3,000/sq mi)

Racial makeup (2011)
  - Black African: 93.1%
  - Coloured: 4.3%
  - Indian/Asian: 0.2%
  - White: 2.0%
  - Other: 0.4%

First languages (2011)
  - Xhosa: 88.3%
  - Afrikaans: 5.1%
  - English: 2.7%
  - Sotho: 2.1%
  - Other: 1.8%
- Time zone: UTC+2 (SAST)
- Postal code (street): 5480
- PO box: 5480
- Area code: 045
- Website: http://www.maclear.co.za/

Maclear, officially Nqanqarhu, is a small town situated in the Eastern Cape province of South Africa, near the Mooi River (a tributary of the Tsitsa River), 172 km (107 mi) north of East London and 80 km (50 mi) northeast of Elliot.

It lies just north-east of Ugie. The land to the east and south was part of the former homeland of Transkei.

The Eastern Grasslands landscape around Nqanqarhu includes sustainable grazing and wool value-chain initiatives involving Conservation South Africa.

== History ==
Maclear was founded in 1876 as a military camp, called Nqanqaru Drift and developed rapidly, reaching municipal status in 1916. It was named after Sir Thomas Maclear (1794–1879), a famous astronomer who laid the foundation for a trigonometrical survey of the Cape Colony.

In 2021, the town was renamed Nqanqarhu.

== Tourism ==
Nqanqarhu is a trout-fishing resort.

== Geographic location ==
Nqanqarhu lies between Mount Fletcher and Ugie, in the foothills of the Drakensberg mountains, and at the intersection between the R56 and R396 roads.
