= Butterworth, South Africa =

Gcuwa Butterworth
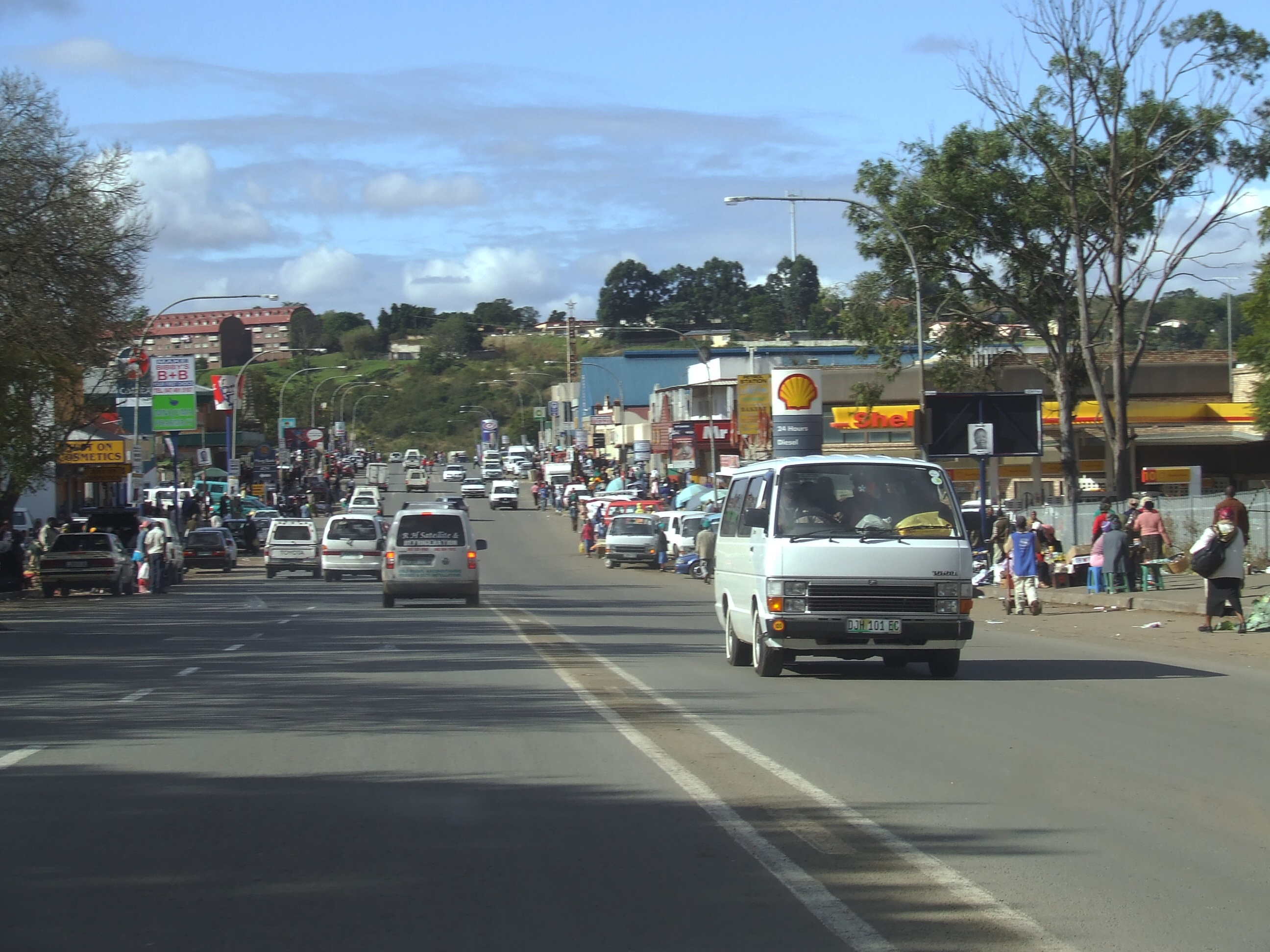
- Butterworth, Main Street

- Location within Eastern Cape Location within South Africa Location within Africa
- Coordinates: 32°20′S 28°09′E
- Country: South Africa
- Province: Eastern Cape
- Municipality: Mnquma

Area
  - Total: 26.34 km^{2} (10.17 sq mi)

Population (2011)
  - Total: 44,041
  - Density: 1,672/km^{2} (4,331/sq mi)

Racial makeup (2011)
  - Black African: 98.2%
  - Coloured: 0.7%
  - Indian/Asian: 0.4%
  - White: 0.5%
  - Other: 0.2%

First languages (2011)
  - Xhosa: 92.7%
  - English: 3.0%
  - Other: 4.3%
- Time zone: UTC+2 (SAST)
- Postal code (street): 4960
- PO box: 4960
- Area code: 047

Gcuwa, also known as Butterworth, is a town in the Eastern Cape Province, South Africa. Gcuwa has a population of 45,900 and is situated on the N2 national highway 111 km north of KuGompo City.

== History ==
The area around Butterworth was populated by amaXhosa, KhoiKhoi and San people.

Butterworth was first established as a Wesleyan mission station in 1827 north of the Great Kei River in British Kaffraria. It was named after Joseph Butterworth. The mission station and white settlement of Butterworth was burnt down 3 times during the Cape Frontier Wars. Nonetheless, it is one of the oldest white settlements in Eastern Cape. When the British seized the Cape of Good Hope, many of the Boers trekked north to establish their own republics. The discovery of diamonds (1867) and gold (1886) in South Africa spurred wealth and immigration and intensified the subjugation of the native inhabitants. The town was close to the seat of Hintsa ka Khawuta, the King of the Xhosa people. It was of great strategic importance.

Around that time, a young girl, Nongqawuse, had a vision that her forebears would help the Xhosa drive the English out. The disastrous result weakened the Xhosa. The Ninth Frontier War spelled the end of the Xhosa, and the Transkei area was incorporated into the Cape Colony. But it was never quiet. There were raids between settlers and Xhosa, and turf wars between different Xhosa groups. Missions were established here and there to try to bring Christianity to the local people, with limited success.

Butterworth is the birthplace of Marmaduke Pattle, the highest scoring RAF ace of World War 2, and Bill Drummond, a Scottish artist, musician, writer, and record producer.

At the end of the Frontier Wars in 1878, traders began to settle here and the town has grown to become a small industrial centre. Butterworth became a municipality of the Cape Colony in 1904. The town was incorporated into the former Transkei bantustan during the apartheid years. It is one of the fastest-growing towns in terms of the economy and the population.

Currently Butterworth is home to nine townships.

== Demographics ==
The town is predominantly Black and Xhosa-speaking. According to the 2001 South African census, the "main place" of Butterworth had a population of 45,900. Of these, 45,142 (98.4%) were recorded as "Black", 345 (0.8%) as "Coloured", 213 (0.5%) as "Indian or Asian" and 200 (0.4%) as White. The most common language spoken at home was Xhosa (96.9%), followed by English (1.7%) and Afrikaans (0.5%). The town is 57% female and 43% male.

=== Religion ===
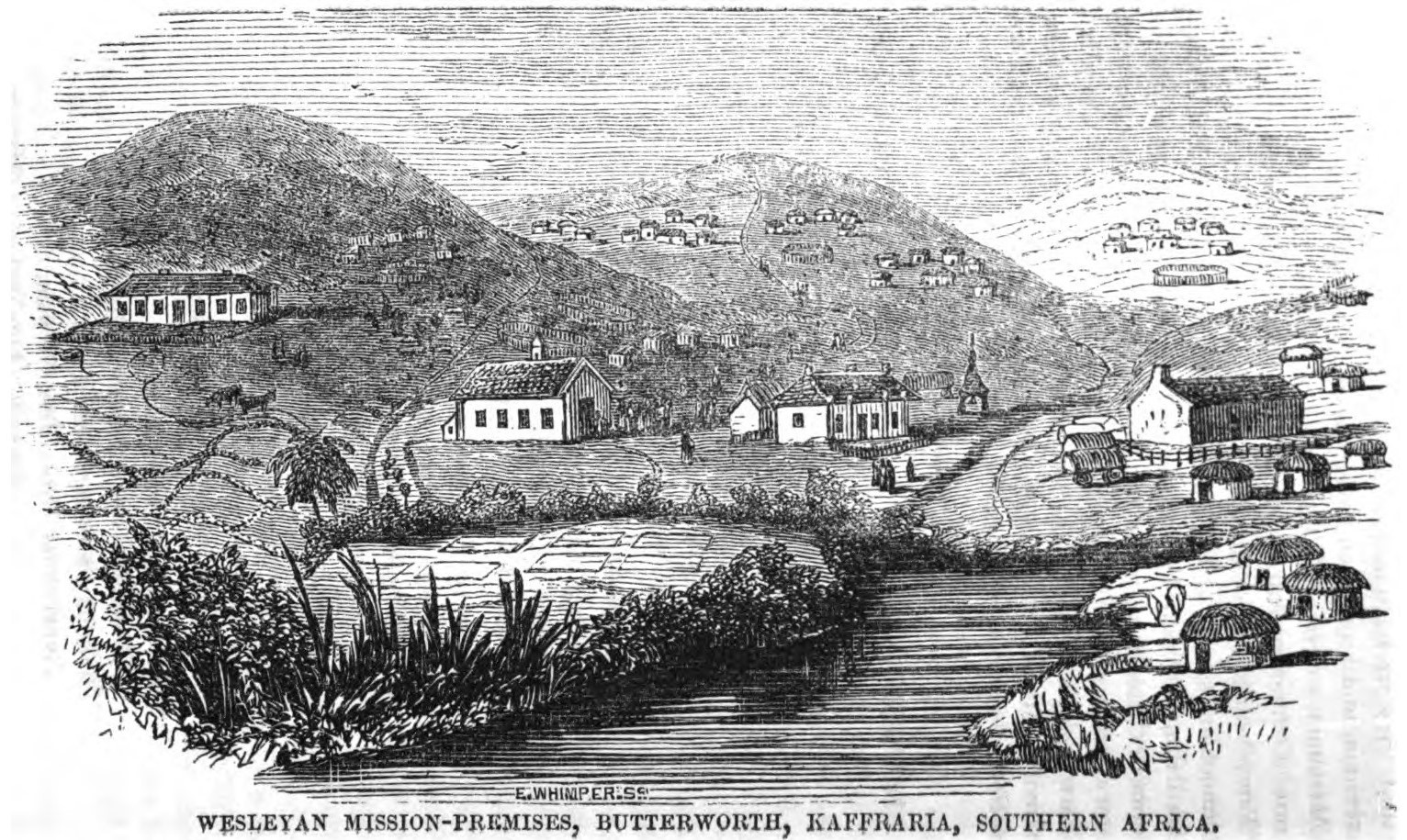
Wesleyan Mission-Premises, Butterworth, Kaffraria, Southern Africa (June 1851, VIII, p.65)

The Church of the Province of Southern Africa has played an important role in the life of the Butterworth community. The late Archbishop Desmond Tutu was seen as a significant spiritual leader. St Peter's Church is a beautiful example of 19th Century colonial architecture.

== Economy ==
Butterworth is the main service area for Mnquma municipality, contributing 77% of the GDP in the municipality and is an important town in the new South Africa. It now has several major industrial sites, including Zitulele and Ibeka, on its outskirts. Its industries produce processed food, beverages, tobacco products, beer, textiles, clothing, leather goods, wood and wood products, chemicals, rubber and plastic products. It is on the Mthatha-East London railway line, but rarely sees a passenger train. This may change when the Bhisho government gets a main line passenger rail service operational.

Butterworth's town area is relatively small, including a small business district of middle-to-high income housing. The central town, established exclusively “white” before 1976, has since been occupied largely by black high-income groups. White occupancy has not been re-established post-1994. Development in Butterworth has followed the line of the N2 and thus resulted in a long, narrow settlement east of town towards Walter Sisulu University (WSU), about 5 km away. The N2 also runs through the CBD, which results in a clash of uses and congestion, with high speed road transport seeming to use the same space as pedestrians, hawkers and public service functions.

Butterworth is also home to the first shopping centre in the area, the Fingoland Mall, launched in October 2012. As of December 2014, there were 51 tenants.

== Tourism ==
Tourist attractions include Bawa Falls, Birding, Cape Vulture Colony, Collywobbles on Mbashe River, Gcuwa River Cascades and various historical sights. Butterworth is surrounded by beautiful countryside. Visitors can go for day walks to the nearby villages such as Tobashana and experience the hospitality of traditional Xhosa living. Gcuwa Dam provides for a man-made lake for boating and fishing.

Nearby Bawa Falls on the Qolorha River, has a sheer drop of nearly 300 ft. The dirt road leading to the falls is just west of the town. Winding through the Transkei countryside, little has changed in the past 100 years. The district's scenery is attractive with its almost ever-green thorn trees and tropical flowers. Bawa Falls has a popular picnic spot and more adventurous hikers can camp overnight. The Cascades Falls on the Gcuwa (Butterworth) River has a reputed fall of 270 ft. Butterworth is the starting point for a number of nature walks.

== Hospitals ==
Butterworth has two provincial hospitals: Butterworth Hospital in the central town is the main hospital serving the people of Dutywa, Willowvale, Centane and Butterworth; and Tafalofefe Hospital in the rural district about 15 km east of Butterworth.
