= Cedarville, South Africa =

Cedarville
- Location within Eastern Cape Location within South Africa
- Coordinates: 30°23′17″S 29°2′28″E
- Country: South Africa
- Province: Eastern Cape
- District: Alfred Nzo
- Municipality: Matatiele

Area
  - Total: 12.40 km^{2} (4.79 sq mi)

Population (2011)
  - Total: 4,412
  - Density: 355.8/km^{2} (921.5/sq mi)

Racial makeup (2011)
  - Black African: 93.0%
  - Coloured: 4.5%
  - Indian/Asian: 0.2%
  - White: 1.8%
  - Other: 0.4%

First languages (2011)
  - Xhosa: 78.1%
  - Sotho: 6.3%
  - Afrikaans: 5.8%
  - English: 5.0%
  - Other: 4.8%
- Time zone: UTC+2 (SAST)
- Postal code (street): 4730
- PO box: 4720
- Area code: 039

Cedarville is a town in the Alfred Nzo District Municipality of Eastern Cape, South Africa.

A village at the foot of the Cedarberg from which it gets its name, it lies 48 km north-west of Kokstad and 278 km from Pietermaritzburg. In 1912, a village management board was established. Cedarville was in Cape Province until in 1978, when becoming part of Natal and then its successor KwaZulu-Natal. And in 2006, became part of the Eastern Cape province.
