= Sterkstroom =

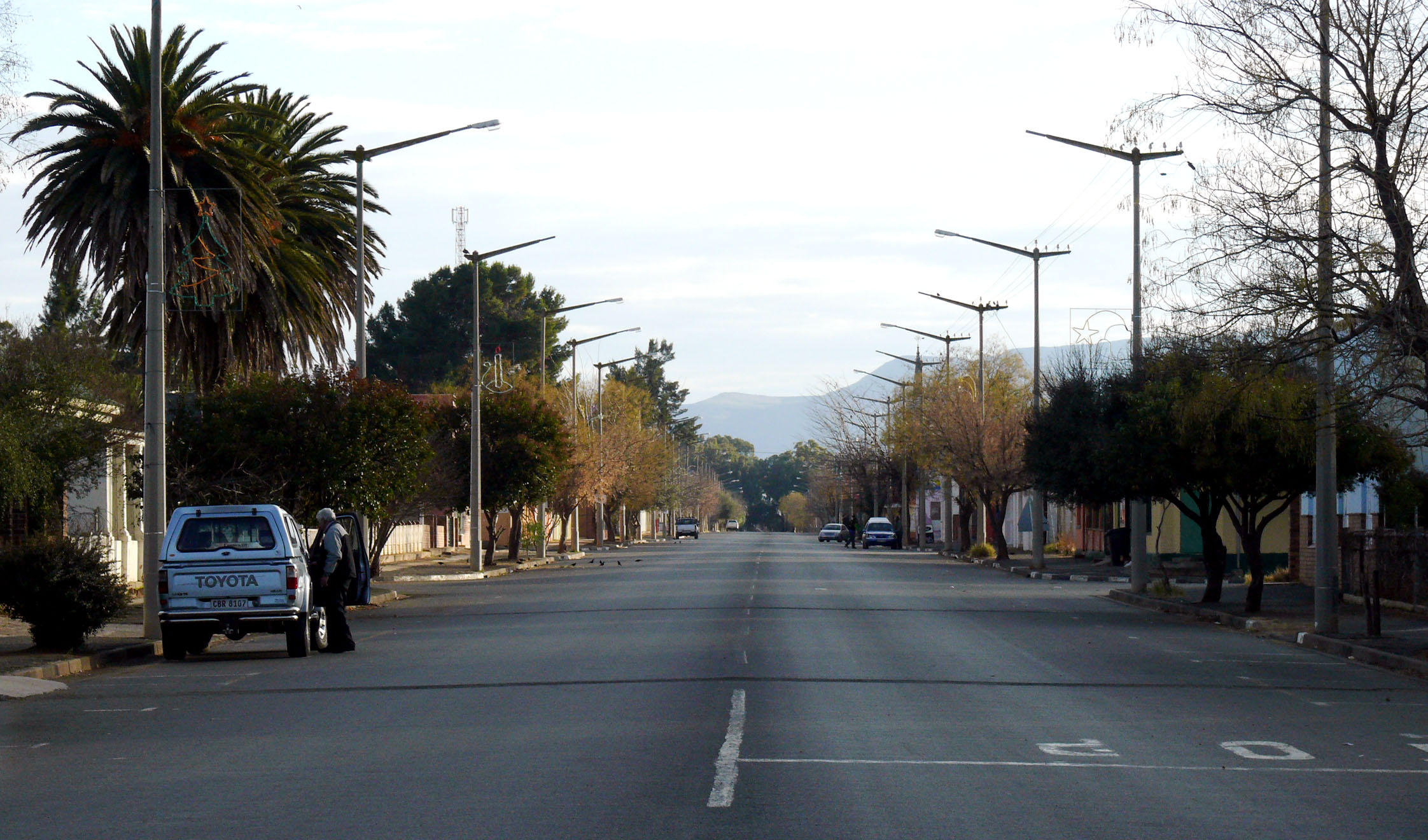
- John Vorster-rylaan, Sterkstroom

- Location within Eastern Cape Location within South Africa
- Coordinates: 31°34′S 26°33′E
- Country: South Africa
- Province: Eastern Cape
- District: Chris Hani
- Municipality: Enoch Mgijima
- Established: 1875

Area
  - Total: 21.1 km^{2} (8.1 sq mi)
- Elevation: 1,355 m (4,446 ft)

Population (2011)
  - Total: 7,165
  - Density: 340/km^{2} (879/sq mi)

Racial makeup (2011)
  - Black African: 92.6%
  - Coloured: 2.6%
  - Indian/Asian: 0.2%
  - White: 4.2%
  - Other: 0.5%

First languages (2011)
  - Xhosa: 89.6%
  - Afrikaans: 6.1%
  - English: 2.0%
  - Other: 2.3%
- Time zone: UTC+2 (SAST)
- Postal code (street): 5425
- PO box: 5425
- Area code: 045

Sterkstroom is a settlement in Enoch Mgijima Local Municipality of the Chris Hani District in the Eastern Cape province of South Africa.

The village is on the Hex River, at the southern foot of the Stormberg, 272 km north-west of East London. It was founded in 1875 and became a municipality in 1878. Afrikaans for ‘strong current or stream’, the name refers to the Hex River.

== Coal mining ==
The former colliery village was situated partly on the town's land and has contributed to the town's development. The coal was of low quality and, like almost all other coal mines in the North-Eastern Cape, was closed after Unification in 1910, because the Cape Colony was then able to source coal from other provinces. Nevertheless, Sterkstroom gradually evolved and livestock farming, for which the area is perfect, continued to expand.

== Municipal infrastructure ==
Sterkstroom's water scheme was completed around 1976. The town was established in 1928 with electricity and in 1966 the electricity scheme was modernized in total at a cost of R280,000. Electrical power was bought in bulk from Queenstown, with Molteno again obtaining its power in bulk from Sterkstroom.

By the mid-1970s, all the streets in the town were constructed and for 4.8 km thereof, surface draining was provided. At that time, a new industrial area with railway sidings was also laid out. The town later boasted a public library, a municipal market where weekly auctions were held and a clinic. The town council had made ample provision for recreational opportunities like rugby, cricket, athletics, tennis, equestrian, golf, badminton and rollerskating. There was also a caravan park and a playground for children.

== Religion and population ==
Sterkstroom is one of a few South African towns where the congregation of the Reformed Church was established before the more common NG Kerk congregation. Sterkstroom's Reformed Church was established in 1887, well 27 years after the first church in the Cape Colony, namely the Burgersdorp Reformed Church. After Burgersdorp also came Aliwal North (1864), Dordrecht (1869), Barkly East (1871), Steynsburg (1872), and Venterstad (1874). Sterkstroom's Reformed Church by 2002 had only 16 confirmed members and 3 baptized members left and was disbanded in that year.

In 1977, Sterkstroom's population composition was 700 white, 200 coloured and 8,000 black Africans. Time being, the NG church had 155 baptized and 340 confirmed members. According to the census of 2011 the population dropped to 300 whites with a black population of around 6,600. By 2012, the NG church's baptized members fell to 27 and 135 confirmed members.
