= Elliot, South Africa =

Elliot
- Khowa
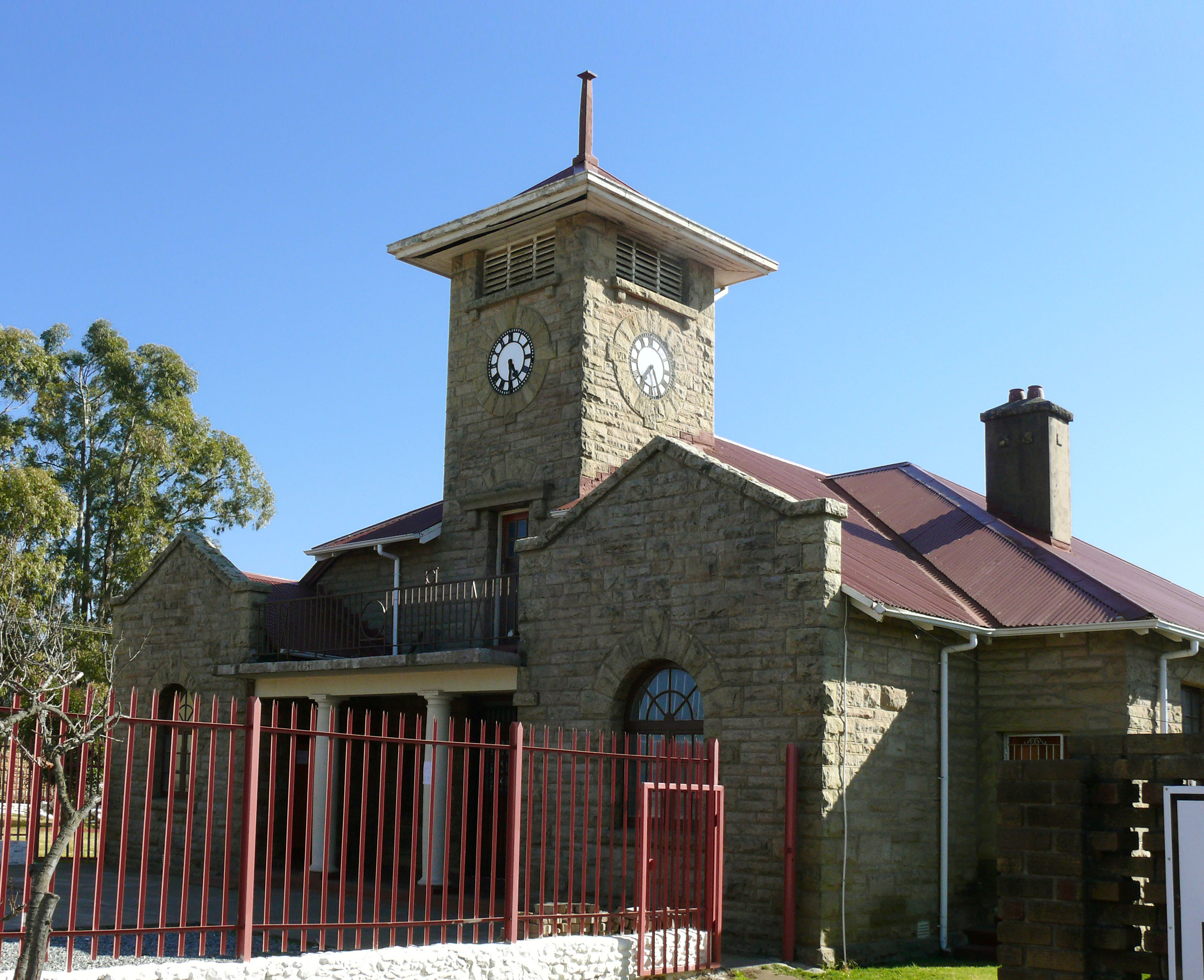
- Town Hall in Elliot

- Location within Eastern Cape Location within South Africa Location within Africa
- Coordinates: 31°20′S 27°51′E
- Country: South Africa
- Province: Eastern Cape
- District: Chris Hani
- Municipality: Sakhisizwe

Area
  - Total: 28.85 km^{2} (11.14 sq mi)

Population (2011)
  - Total: 14,376
  - Density: 498.3/km^{2} (1,291/sq mi)

Racial makeup (2011)
  - Black African: 93.9%
  - Coloured: 2.6%
  - Indian/Asian: 0.4%
  - White: 2.7%
  - Other: 0.3%

First languages (2011)
  - Xhosa: 87.1%
  - Afrikaans: 4.5%
  - English: 4.5%
  - Sign language: 1.7%
  - Other: 2.3%
- Time zone: UTC+2 (SAST)
- Postal code (street): 5460
- PO box: 5460
- Area code: 045

Elliot, also known as Khowa, is a town in Chris Hani District Municipality in the Eastern Cape province of South Africa, and lies 80 km south-west of Maclear and 65 km south-east of Barkly East on the R56 road.

== History ==
Originally the village was established in 1885 and known as Slang River, and in April 1894 was renamed Elliot, becoming a municipality in 1911. Named after Sir Henry George Elliot (1826–1912), Chief Magistrate of the Transkeian territories from 1891 to 1902. It was renamed Khowa in 2016.

== Notable people ==
- Mark Andrews, rugby player
- Binx, singer and musician
- Os du Randt, rugby player

== Climate ==
Climate data for Elliot, elevation 1,463 m (4,800 ft), (1991–2020 normals, extremes 2001–2023)
Month	Jan	Feb	Mar	Apr	May	Jun	Jul	Aug	Sep	Oct	Nov	Dec	Year
Record high °C (°F)	38.9 (102.0)	34.2 (93.6)	32.4 (90.3)	31.2 (88.2)	27.5 (81.5)	25.3 (77.5)	24.3 (75.7)	27.9 (82.2)	32.4 (90.3)	33.6 (92.5)	34.7 (94.5)	35.3 (95.5)	38.9 (102.0)
Mean daily maximum °C (°F)	27.2 (81.0)	27.1 (80.8)	25.8 (78.4)	22.8 (73.0)	20.9 (69.6)	17.8 (64.0)	18.2 (64.8)	20.4 (68.7)	24.1 (75.4)	24.9 (76.8)	25.4 (77.7)	26.4 (79.5)	23.4 (74.1)
Daily mean °C (°F)	20.1 (68.2)	20.0 (68.0)	18.6 (65.5)	15.5 (59.9)	13.0 (55.4)	9.8 (49.6)	9.7 (49.5)	11.5 (52.7)	14.6 (58.3)	16.2 (61.2)	17.5 (63.5)	18.9 (66.0)	15.5 (59.8)
Mean daily minimum °C (°F)	13.0 (55.4)	13.0 (55.4)	11.4 (52.5)	8.1 (46.6)	5.3 (41.5)	1.8 (35.2)	1.1 (34.0)	2.7 (36.9)	5.2 (41.4)	7.5 (45.5)	9.6 (49.3)	11.4 (52.5)	7.5 (45.5)
Record low °C (°F)	4.8 (40.6)	4.2 (39.6)	2.6 (36.7)	−3.5 (25.7)	−5.6 (21.9)	−10.4 (13.3)	−9.7 (14.5)	−8.3 (17.1)	−4.7 (23.5)	−2.5 (27.5)	−1.0 (30.2)	2.3 (36.1)	−10.4 (13.3)
Average precipitation mm (inches)	108.2 (4.26)	110.1 (4.33)	96.7 (3.81)	50.4 (1.98)	28.5 (1.12)	15.0 (0.59)	14.3 (0.56)	19.6 (0.77)	39.9 (1.57)	61.6 (2.43)	87.4 (3.44)	93.2 (3.67)	724.9 (28.53)
Average precipitation days (≥ 0.25 mm)	8.5	8.8	7.4	4.7	2.5	1.6	1.7	2.2	4.0	6.6	7.0	6.7	61.7
Source: Starlings Roost Weather (precipitation 1906–2023)
