= Dordrecht, South Africa =

Dordrecht
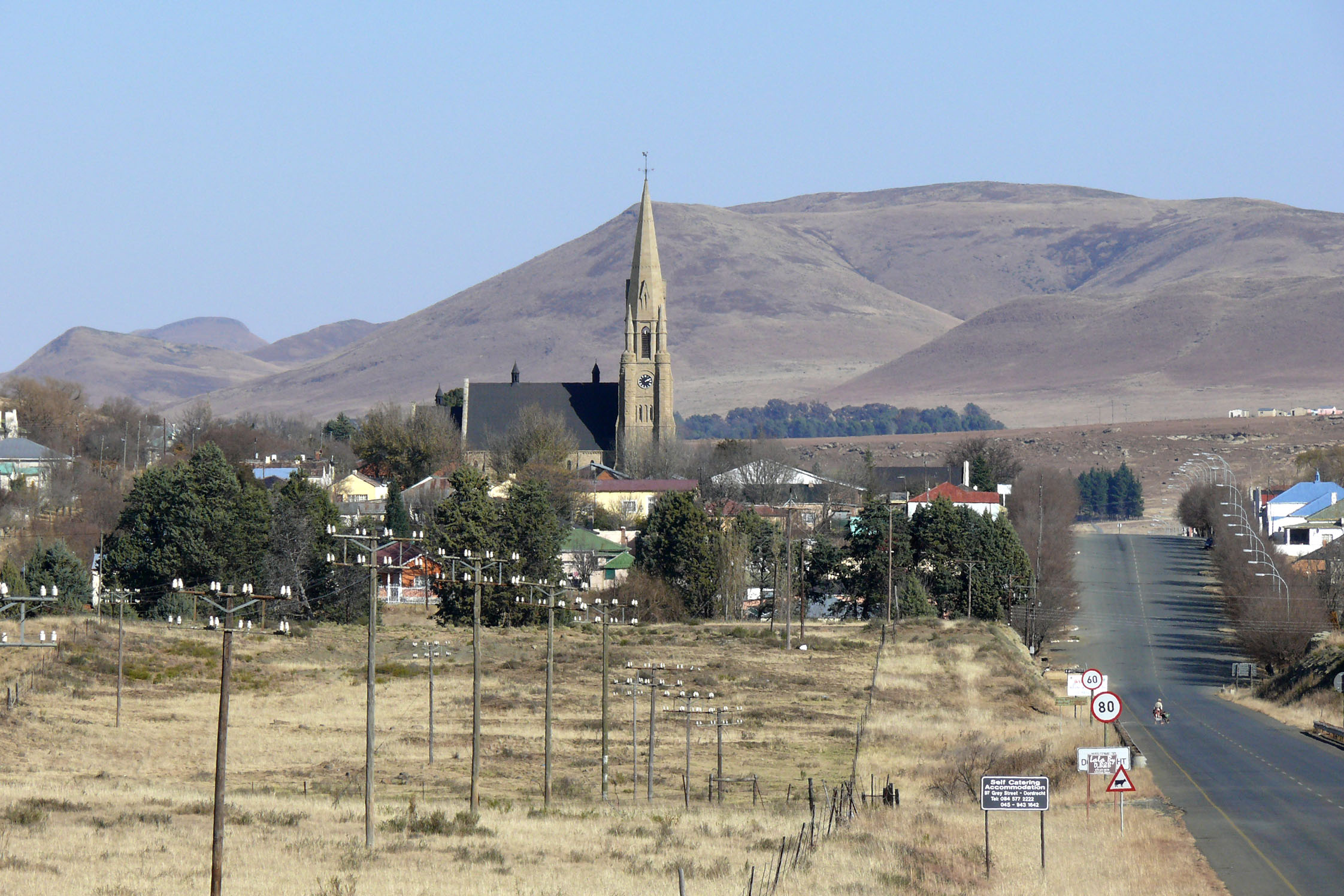
- View of the town of Dordrecht

- Location within Eastern Cape Location within South Africa
- Coordinates: 31°22′S 27°3′E
- Country: South Africa
- Province: Eastern Cape
- District: Chris Hani
- Municipality: Emalahleni

Area
  - Total: 17.4 km^{2} (6.7 sq mi)
- Elevation: 1,600 m (5,200 ft)

Population (2011)
  - Total: 10,261
  - Density: 590/km^{2} (1,530/sq mi)

Racial makeup (2011)
  - Black African: 93.1%
  - Coloured: 3.3%
  - Indian/Asian: 0.4%
  - White: 2.8%
  - Other: 0.4%

First languages (2011)
  - Xhosa: 90.1%
  - Afrikaans: 5.4%
  - English: 2.0%
  - Other: 2.5%
- Time zone: UTC+2 (SAST)
- Postal code (street): 5435
- PO box: 5435
- Area code: 045

Dordrecht is a town situated in the Eastern Cape Province of South Africa. Dordrecht was founded in 1856 by Baron Smiddolff (later changed to Smithdorff), a minister of the Dutch Reformed Church. The town was named for the city of the same name in the South-Western Netherlands and had a population of about 8,741 people in 2001.

== Description ==
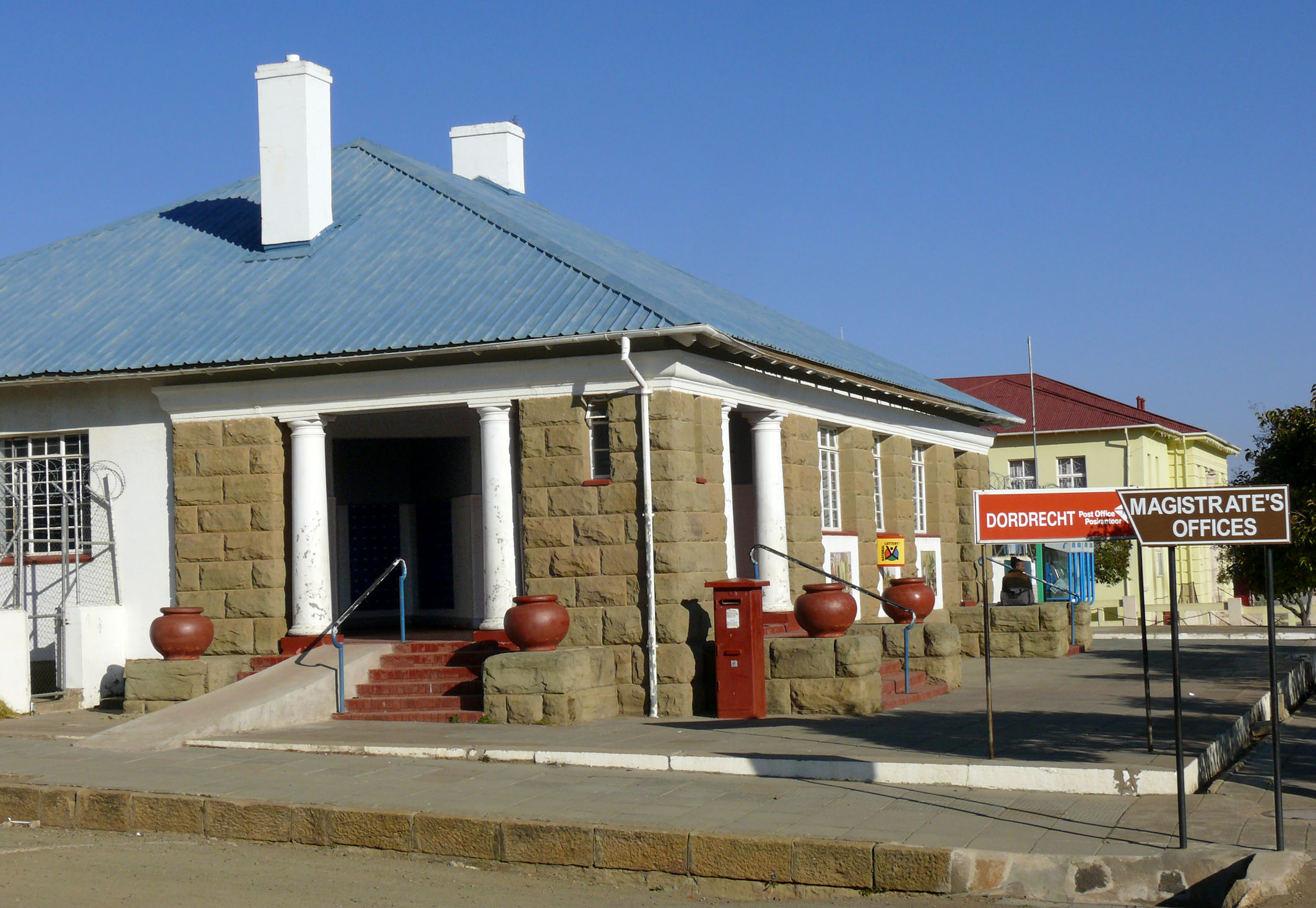
Grain mill with bevel gears outside local museum

Dordrecht lies nestled in the Stormberg Mountains, just north of Queenstown between Middelburg and Mthatha. Its many historical buildings and museum display turn-of-the-century furniture and clothing. Dordrecht is a small town surrounded by a number of farms with a large number of merino sheep and cattle ranchers in the region. Farmers around Dordrecht also grow potatoes. Dordrecht has a number of historical sites including a unique 1873 colonial country bed-and-breakfast. There are farmstay holidays available in the region. They are well known in South Africa for trout fishing, pheasant hunting and game hunting. The town is also situated near the Western Drakensberg Mountains where South Africa's only snow skiing resort is found.

It has two high schools, Masikhanyise High School and Dordrecht High School (which is 102 years old). Its oldest townships are Sinako township, Munikville and Marabastad.

A Remembrance Garden is in the city centre in memory of Baron Smithdorff, and high in the kopje in the foothills is a plaque dedicated to the Smithdorff family.

== Climate ==
Dordrecht

Climate chart (precipitation, max. and min. temperature)
J	F	M	A	M	J	J	A	S	O	N	D
70 26 12	80 25 11	77 23 10	38 20 6	18 17 2	7 14 0	5 14 −1	9 16 0	17 19 4	33 21 7	53 23 9	59 25 10
- █ Average max. and min. temperatures in °C
- █ Precipitation totals in mm
- Source: SA Explorer
Imperial conversion
J	F	M	A	M	J	J	A	S	O	N	D
2.8 79 54	3.1 77 52	3 73 50	1.5 68 43	0.7 63 36	0.3 57 32	0.2 57 30	0.4 61 32	0.7 66 39	1.3 70 45	2.1 73 48	2.3 77 50
- █ Average max. and min. temperatures in °F
- █ Precipitation totals in inches

Dordrecht has a subtropical highland climate (Cwb, according to the Köppen climate classification), with warm summers and chilly, dry winters, with occasional snowfalls. It borders on a cold semi-arid climate (BSk). The average annual precipitation is 466 mm (18 in), with most rainfall occurring mainly during summer.

The village of Buffelsfontein, located between the towns of Dordrecht and Molteno, has the lowest recorded temperature in South Africa, of −20.1 °C (−4 °F), on 23 August 2013. The former national record, of −18.6 °C (−1 °F), was also registered in the same locality, on 28 June 1996.

== See also ==
- Dordrecht Reformed Church (NGK)
