= R396 (South Africa) =

Regional route in South Africa

Regional route R396
- R396 route map

Location
- Country: South Africa

Highway system
- Numbered routes of South Africa
← R394	→ R397

The R396 is a Regional Route in South Africa that connects the N2 north of Mthatha to Lady Frere via Maclear, Rhodes, Barkly East, and Indwe.
