= Ekhephini =

Ekhephini Barkly East
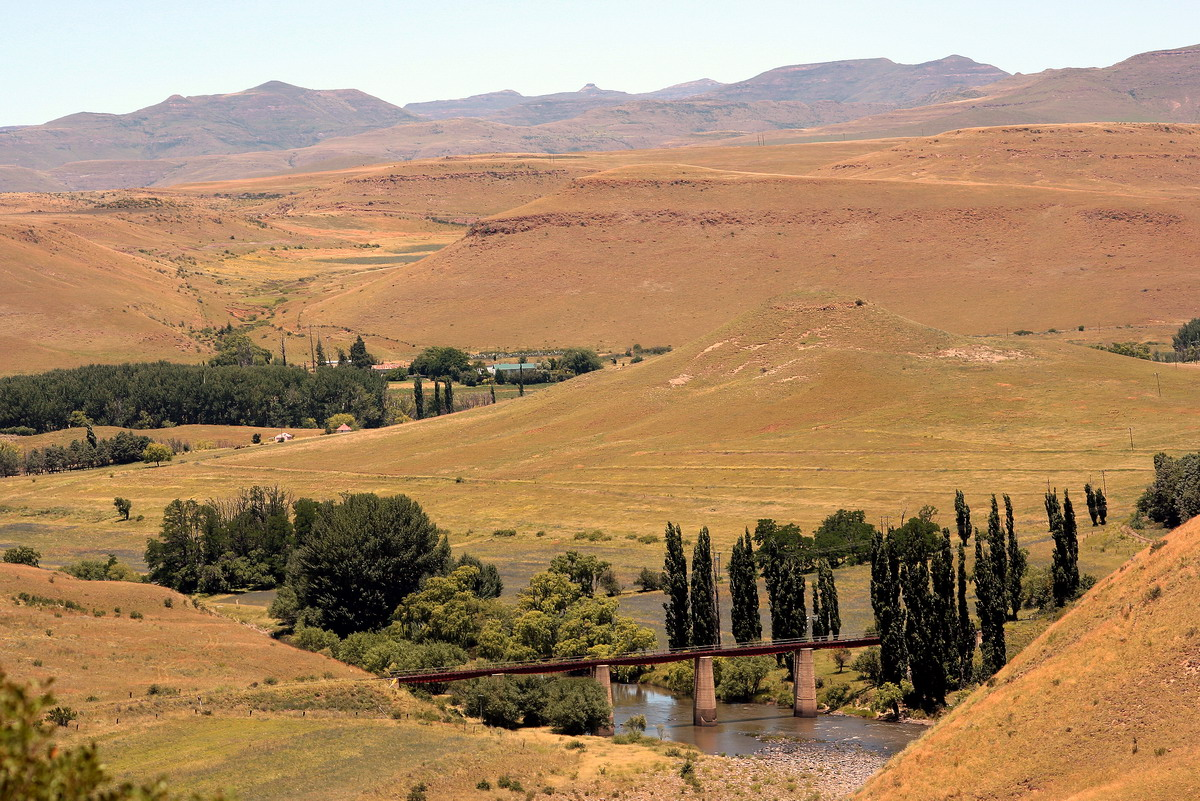
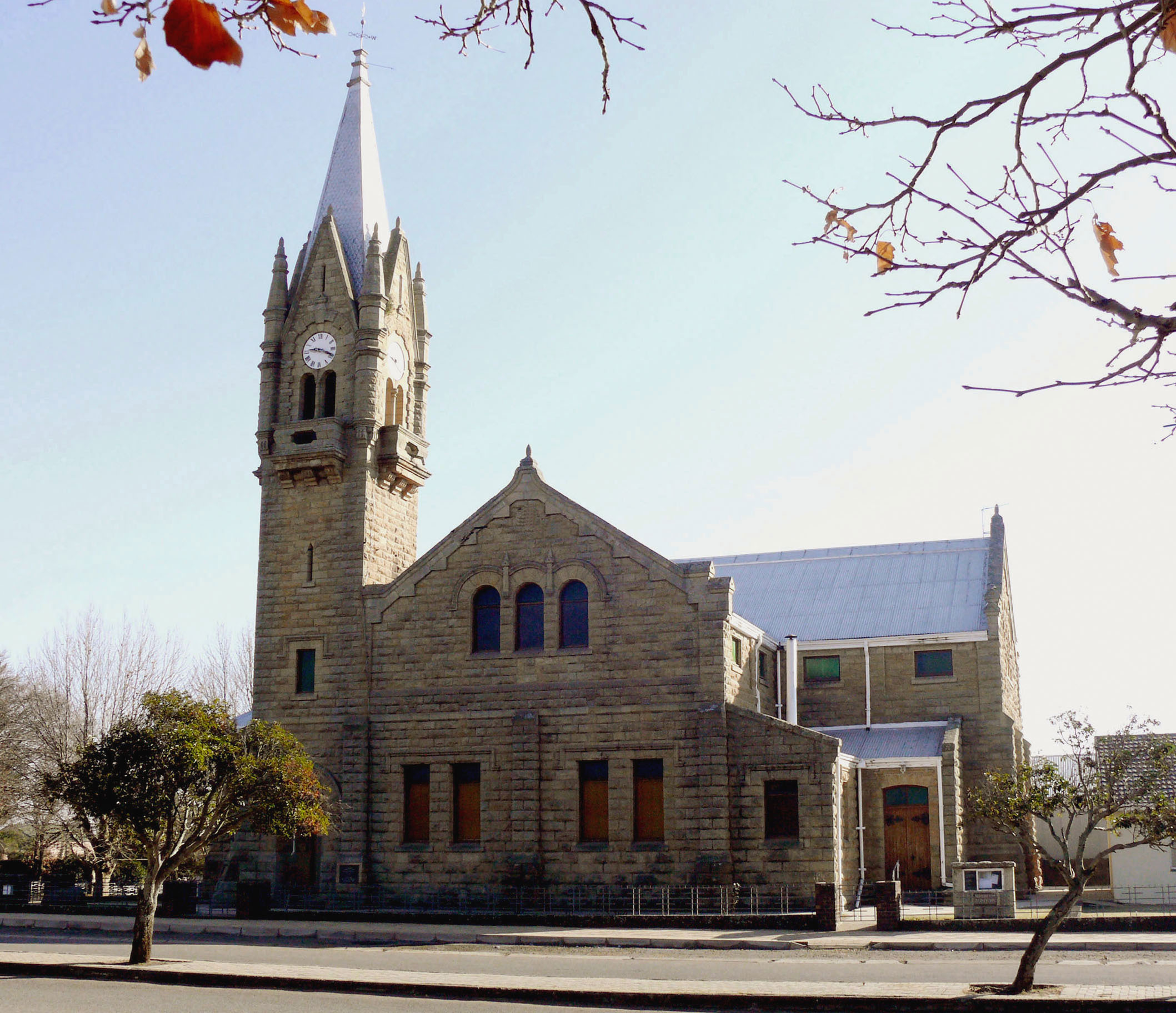
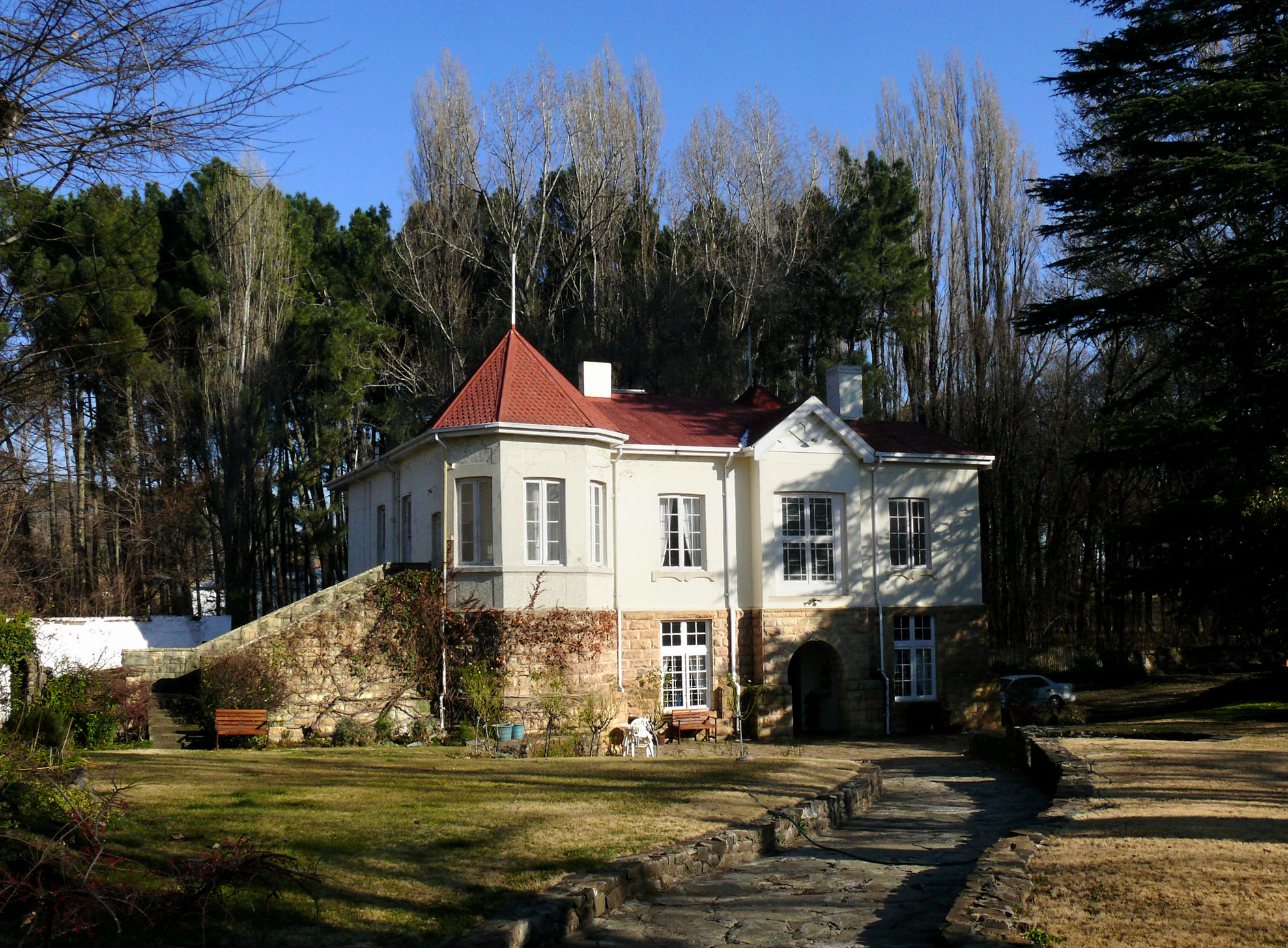
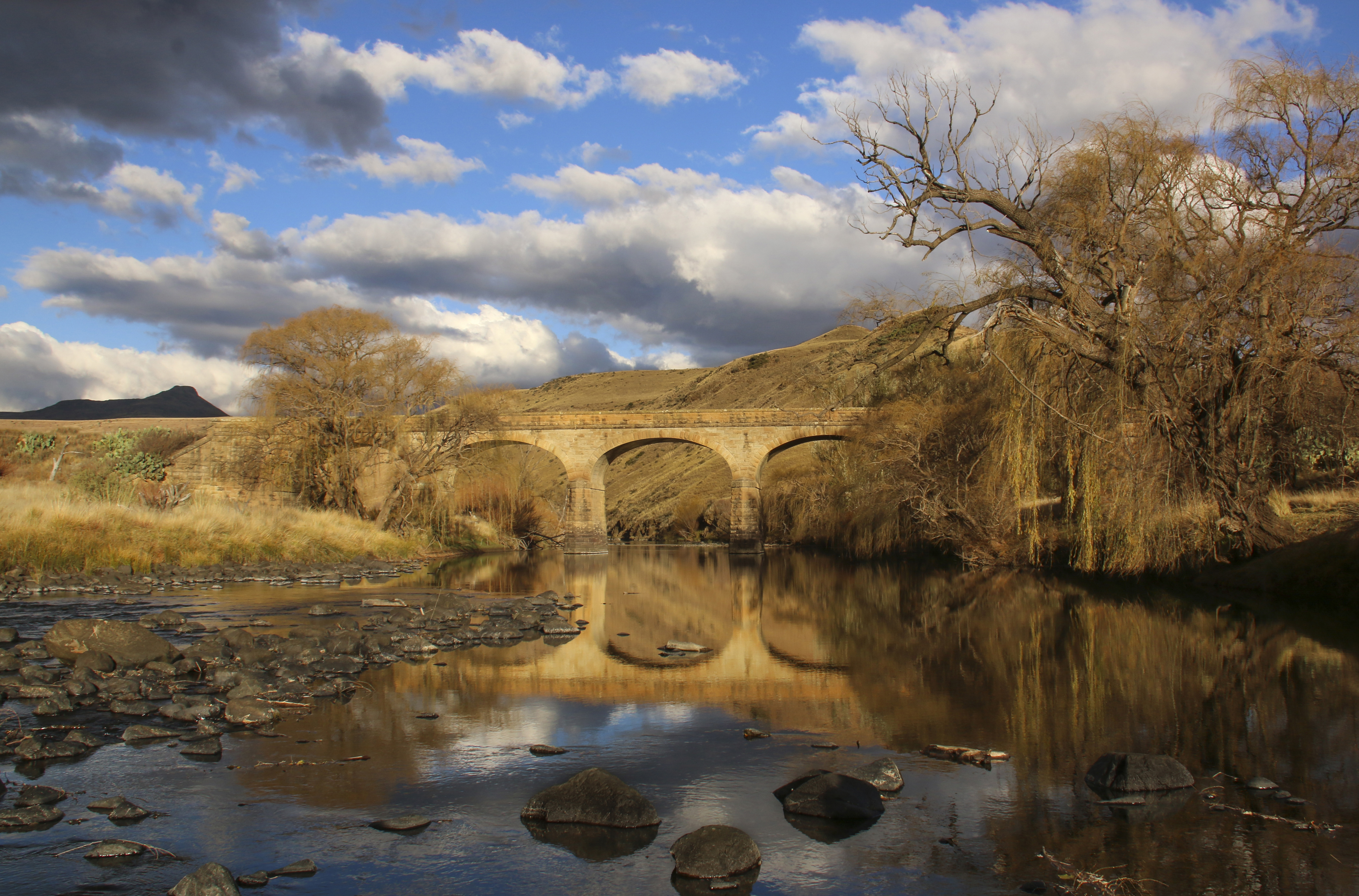
- Ekhephini viewed from behind the mountain NG Church Old Manor House Loch Bridge near Ekhephini

- Location within Eastern Cape Location within South Africa Location within Africa
- Coordinates: 30°58′05″S 27°35′36″E
- Country: South Africa
- Province: Eastern Cape
- District: Joe Gqabi
- Municipality: Senqu
- Established: 1873

Area
  - Total: 16.80 km^{2} (6.49 sq mi)
- Elevation: 1,790 m (5,870 ft)

Population (2011)
  - Total: 9,986
  - Density: 594.4/km^{2} (1,540/sq mi)

Racial makeup (2011)
  - Black African: 90.4%
  - Coloured: 6.2%
  - Indian/Asian: 0.2%
  - White: 2.9%
  - Other: 0.3%

First languages (2011)
  - Xhosa: 74.6%
  - Sotho: 11.7%
  - Afrikaans: 8.6%
  - English: 2.6%
  - Other: 2.5%
- Time zone: UTC+2 (SAST)
- Postal code (street): 9786
- PO box: 9786
- Area code: 045-971-
- Website: www.barklyeast.co.za

Ekhephini, until February 2026 Barkly East (Afrikaans: Barkly-Oos), is a town in Eastern Cape Province, South Africa, seat of the Joe Gqabi District Municipality, and 117 km by road E.S.E. of Maletswai, lying in the mountainous area just south of Lesotho. The town lies at the southern tip of the Drakensberg on the Langkloofspruit, a tributary of the Kraai River which, in turn is a tributary of the Orange River at an elevation of 1 790 meter (5 873 foot) above sealevel. Barkly East is characterized by rugged mountains and green valleys. Snow falls in winter, and the hamlet of Rhodes is 60 km or an hour's drive from Barkly East on the R396. Both are within the boundaries of the Senqu Local Municipality.

It has been one of the few areas in South Africa where winter sports are pursued, and in summer fly fishing for Rainbow trout and indigenous Smallmouth yellowfish, trail running, mountain biking, rock paintings by the San people, tennis and the scenery draws tourists to the district.

Xhosa and Afrikaans are spoken by most of the inhabitants, while English and some Sotho are also spoken. The primary economic base of the district is sheep-farming.

== History ==
Like Barkly West, the town was named after Sir Henry Barkly, governor of the Cape Colony from 1870 to 1877. On 14 December 1874 the then-Governor, Sir Henry Barkly proclaimed that a town could split from Wodehouse.

== Geography ==
=== Climate ===
Ekhephini has a subtropical highland climate (Cwb, according to the Köppen climate classification), with mild summers and chilly, dry winters, with occasional snowfalls. It borders on a cold semi-arid climate (BSk). The average annual precipitation is 567 mm (22 in), with most rainfall occurring during summer.

Ekhephini

Climate chart (precipitation, max. and min. temperature)
J	F	M	A	M	J	J	A	S	O	N	D
80 24 11	85 23 11	65 21 9	46 18 5	28 16 2	11 13 0	8 13 −1	11 15 0	22 18 4	46 20 6	67 21 8	78 23 10
- █ Average max. and min. temperatures in °C
- █ Precipitation totals in mm
- Source: SA Explorer
Imperial conversion
J	F	M	A	M	J	J	A	S	O	N	D
3.1 75 52	3.3 73 52	2.6 70 48	1.8 64 41	1.1 61 36	0.4 55 32	0.3 55 30	0.4 59 32	0.9 64 39	1.8 68 43	2.6 70 46	3.1 73 50
- █ Average max. and min. temperatures in °F
- █ Precipitation totals in inches

== See also ==
- Barkly West
- Wodehouse
