= Leratswana =

- Location within Free State (South African province) Location within South Africa
- Coordinates: 28°02′S 27°51′E
- Country: South Africa
- Province: Free State
- District: Thabo Mofutsanyana
- Municipality: Nketoana

Area
  - Total: 1.54 km^{2} (0.59 sq mi)

Population (2011)
  - Total: 3,743
  - Density: 2,430/km^{2} (6,300/sq mi)

Racial makeup (2011)
  - Black African: 99.6%
  - Coloured: 0.1%
  - Indian/Asian: 0.2%
  - White: 0.1%

First languages (2011)
  - Sotho: 89.6%
  - Sign language: 3.3%
  - Afrikaans: 2.6%
  - Zulu: 2.0%
  - Other: 2.5%
- Time zone: UTC+2 (SAST)
- Postal code (street): 9602
- PO box: 9602

Leratswana is a small township in the Free State province of South Africa, adjacent to Arlington. Arlington was established as an important railway link between Lindley and Senekal.

== Geography and Layout ==
Leratswana (like all Free State towns) features a racial segregated geography due to the policies of Apartheid. This can be seen by the fact that the white population live in the town of Arlington, while the non-white (almost exclusively black) community lives in the neighboring township of Leratswana, which is currently being greatly extended. Leratswana has by far a greater population than Arlington, and therefore if the two were part of a single town, it would have a black majority.

Although very few non-whites have moved into the actual town of 'Arlington', this remains minimal.

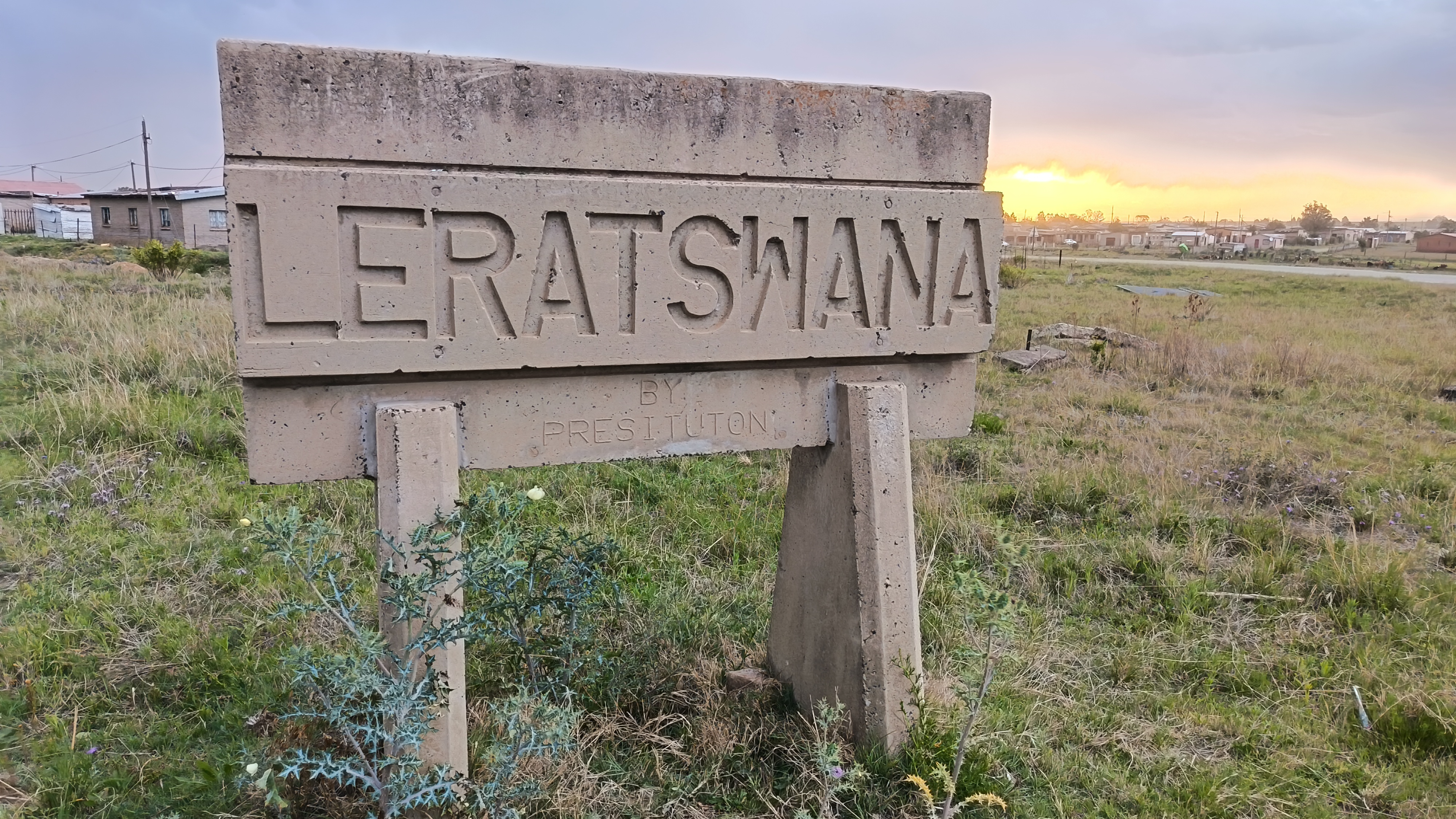
Leratswana

== Road ==
Leratswana lies on the R707, which separates Arlington from Leratswana. This road connects the towns of Lindley and Senekal.

== See also ==
- Arlington
