= R725 road =

R725 road may refer to:

- R725 road (Ireland)
- R725 (South Africa)
