= R726 (South Africa) =

Regional route R726

Route information
- Length: 45.4 km (28.2 mi)

Major junctions
- South-east end: R392 / R393 near Sterkspruit
- North-west end: R26 in Zastron

Location
- Country: South Africa

Highway system
- Numbered routes of South Africa
← R725	→ R727

The R726 is a Regional Route in South Africa. Its north-western terminus is the R26 at Zastron, Free State. It heads south-east into the Eastern Cape to meet the R392 near Sterkspruit.

== Route ==
The R726's north-western terminus is a junction with R26 road just north of Zastron. It heads south-east for 45 kilometres to cross the Majaphuthi Bridge on the Orange River and reach its end at a junction with the R392 and R393 at the village of Masaleng, 6 kilometres north of Sterkspruit.
