= R392 road =

R392 road may refer to:

- R392 road (Ireland)
- R392 road (South Africa)
