= R393 road =

R393 road may refer to:

- R393 road (Ireland)
- R393 road (South Africa)
