= R725 (South Africa) =

Regional route in South Africa

Regional route R725

Route information
- Length: 66.8 km (41.5 mi)

Major junctions
- South end: R707 near Lindley
- North end: R34 / R57 in Heilbron

Location
- Country: South Africa

Highway system
- Numbered routes of South Africa
← R724	→ R726

The R725 is a Regional Route in South Africa.

== Route ==
Its northern terminus is the R34/R57 at Heilbron. From there, it runs south to cross the Renoster River and reach its end at a junction with the R707 in Lindley, just north of the R707's Vals River crossing.
