= R723 (South Africa) =

Regional route in South Africa

Regional route R723

Route information
- Length: 72.5 km (45.0 mi)

Major junctions
- West end: R59 at Parys
- N1 near Kroonvaal; R82
- East end: R57 / R34 near Heilbron

Location
- Country: South Africa

Highway system
- Numbered routes of South Africa
← R722	→ R724

The R723 is a Regional Route in Free State, South Africa that connects Parys with Heilbron.

== Route ==
Its north-western terminus is the R59 at Parys. From there it runs south-east, crossing the N1. It then meets the R82, and becomes cosigned with it briefly, heading east. Diverging from the R82, it continues south-east to end its route at Heilbron at an intersection with the R57.
