= R724 (South Africa) =

Regional route in South Africa

Regional route R724

Route information
- Length: 59.6 km (37.0 mi)

Major junctions
- South end: R707 near Petrus Steyn
- North end: R76 near Bethlehem

Location
- Country: South Africa

Highway system
- Numbered routes of South Africa
← R723	→ R725

The R724 is a Regional Route in South Africa.

== Route ==
Its northern terminus is the R707 at Petrus Steyn. It heads south to end at the R76 at Bethlehem.
