= R57 =

R57 may refer to:

- R57 (South Africa), a road
- HMS Cossack (R57), a destroyer of the Royal Navy
- Mini Cabrio (R57), a car
- R57: Toxic to bees, a risk phrase
