= R57 (South Africa) =

Road in South Africa

Provincial route R57

Route information
- Maintained by GDRT and FSDPRT
- Length: 258 km (160 mi)

Major junctions
- North end: N1 near Vanderbijlpark
- R42 in Vanderbijlpark; R59 in Sasolburg; R82 near Sasolburg; R34 in Heilbron; R26 near Reitz; N5 in Kestell
- South end: S20 in Phuthaditjhaba

Location
- Country: South Africa
- Major cities: Vanderbijlpark, Sasolburg, Heilbron, Petrus Steyn, Reitz, Kestell, Phuthaditjhaba

Highway system
- Numbered routes of South Africa
← R56	→ R58

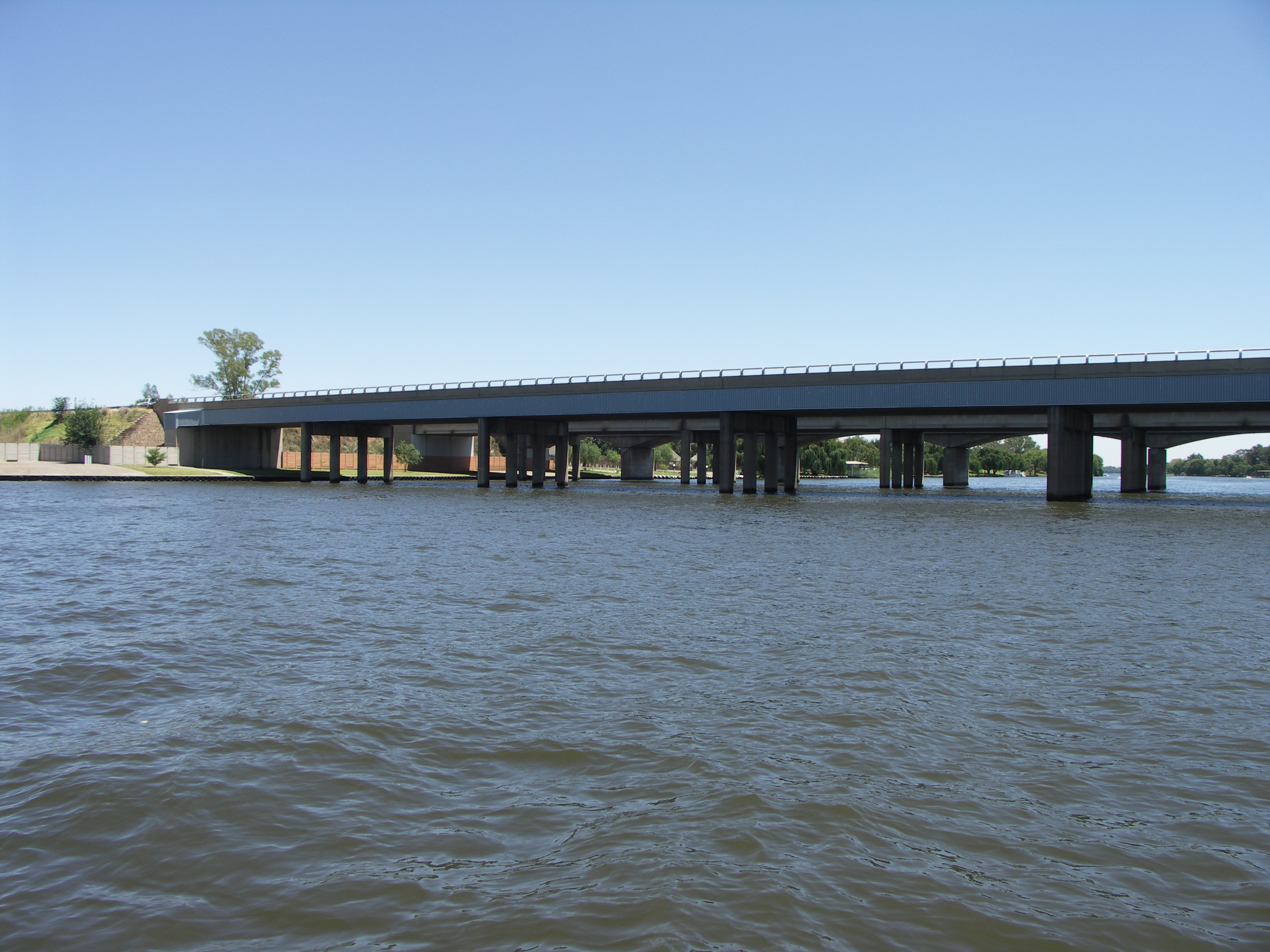
The R57 bridge over the Vaal River

The R57 is a provincial route in South Africa that connects Vanderbijlpark with Phuthaditjhaba via Sasolburg, Heilbron and Reitz.

== Route ==
Detailed Route

=== Gauteng ===
The R57 begins at an intersection with the N1 Kroonvaal Toll Highway (east southbound only) north-west of Vanderbijlpark. It begins by running south-south-east. After 5 kilometres, the R57 meets the R553 Golden Highway from Sebokeng, which marks its entrance into Vanderbijlpark. The R57 takes over the name Golden Highway from this junction southwards and makes up the border between the Muvhango Township & Vanderbijlpark Central.

From the R553 intersection, the R57 continues south-south-east for 4 kilometres to meet the R42 road (Barrage Road) adjacent to Vaal Mall at a junction. After this intersection, the R57 becomes a highway (dual carriageway; passing under roads with off-ramps at certain junctions) and continues southwards for 4 kilometres, through the south-western suburbs of Vanderbijlpark, to cross the Vaal River into the Free State province.

=== Free State ===
From the Vaal River crossing, it continues for another 3 kilometres, bypassing the Vaalpark suburb, to meet the R59 Sybrand van Niekerk Freeway at a major interchange north of Sasolburg Central.

From the R59 interchange, the R57 continues south-east as a highway (with off-ramps) for 9 kilometres, bypassing Sasolburg Central and the Zamdela suburb, up to its junction with the R82 road from Vereeniging, Gauteng in the suburb of Coalbrook. It continues for another 3 kilometres south-east to meet a road to Deneysville (Vaal Dam) (connecting to the R549 and R716 roads).

From the junction with the road to Deneysville, the R57 continues southwards for 47 kilometres to the town of Heilbron. It bypasses Heilbron Central to the west before meeting the R34 road. The R57 and the R34 are cosigned eastwards for 3 kilometres, meeting the south-eastern terminus of the R723 route and the northern terminus of the R725 route, before the R57 becomes its own road southwards just south of Heilbron Central. From the R34 junction, the R57 continues south-south-east for 44 kilometres to the town of Petrus Steyn, where it meets the R707 route at a staggered junction east of the town centre.

The R57 continues east-south-east for 33 kilometres to the town of Reitz. 3 kilometres before the Reitz City Centre, the R57 meets the R26 road from Frankfort. After entering Reitz as Sarel Cilliers Street, the R57 continues by a left turn at Voortrekker Street and returns to facing southwards at the junction after 1st Street.

From Reitz, the R57 continues south-south-east for 38 kilometres to reach a junction with the R714 route. The road continues for another 29 kilometres, through Afrikaskop, to the town of Kestell, where it meets the N5 highway. It bypasses the town to the east and proceeds southwards for 24 kilometres to meet the R712 road (accessed by an off-ramp) next to the University of the Free State Qwaqwa Campus, marking its entrance into Phuthaditjhaba. It proceeds as Mota Road to reach its end in the vicinity of Phuthaditjhaba at a junction with Mampoi Road.
