= R726 road =

R726 road may refer to:

- R726 road (Ireland)
- R726 (South Africa)
