= Sedan Beehive stone huts =

Archaeological site in South Africa

Coordinates: 27°53′49″S 27°47′25″E

The Sedan Beehive stone huts are a provincial heritage site in Lindley in the Free State province of South Africa.

In 1950 it was described in the Government Gazette as

A group of pre-historic stone huts; the terrain contains remainings of a settlement from the early Sotho culture.

== Description ==
These huts are near the farm Sedan which is about 13 kilometres (8.1 mi) west of Lindley. They include some of the best-preserved examples of these huts. The walls were built of stones packed without any mortar in such a manner that successive courses overlapped inwards until the opening at the apex was small enough to be closed by a single large slab. For obvious reasons, the huts were generally small. Few of them exceeded an internal diameter of 150 centimetres (59 in), and the height from floor to apex of the roof was barely 120 centimetres (47 in). The only opening was the entrance at ground level usually about 45 centimetres (18 in) high and 40 centimetres (16 in) wide, so that it was necessary to enter the structure by crawling on one's stomach.

== See also ==
- Beehive house
