= Battle of Vegkop =

1836 conflict during the Great Trek of the Boers

Coordinates: 27°28′39″S 27°54′50″E

- Part of the Great Trek
Date	16 October 1836
Location	present Heilbron, Free State, South Africa
Result	Voortrekker victory

Belligerents
Voortrekkers	Matabele

Commanders and leaders
Andries Potgieter	King Mzilikazi

Strength
35 mounted infantry	About 4,000 – 5,000 spearmen

Casualties and losses
2 dead	400–500 dead

The Battle of Vegkop, alternatively spelled as Vechtkop, took place on 16 October 1836 near the present day town of Heilbron, Free State, South Africa. After an impi of about 600 Matebele murdered 15 to 17 Afrikaner voortrekkers on the Vaal River, abducting three children, King Mzilikazi (c. 1790 – 9 September 1868; also known as Mzilikazi, Oemsiligasi or Moselekatse; Afrikaans: Silkaats) ordered another attack. The Voortrekkers, under the command of Andries Potgieter, repulsed them, but at the cost of abandoning their livestock.

== Attack on the camp ==
On 9 October, King Mzilikazi sent an army of 5,000 Matabele warriors to attack the Voortrekkers. About one-third of these, however, were slaves whose motivation was simply to steal cattle. The Voortrekkers had been warned by Betsjoena or Bataoeng bushmen about the impi's arrival two days beforehand. So they secured their laager by placing the 46 wagons in a circle and filling the spaces underneath and between them with thorn branches to prevent the attackers from crawling through. Inside the laager, a square of four wagons were placed and covered with animal skin and wooden planks to protect the women and children from the assegais (stabbing and throwing spears) of the Matebele. There were around 33 adult men and seven boys to defend the laager. Every man in the laager (camp) went to his designated post, the muzzles of the muskets were rinsed because a dirty barrel slowed the loading process, and fresh flintstones were inserted into the firing mechanism. The flintstone was good for thirty shots on average. Gunpowder was poured into bowls, and bags with buck-shot were placed alongside each rifleman. Every rifleman had two muzzle loaders and an assistant that enabled the rifleman to maintain a rate of fire of four shots per minute.

On the morning of the attack, 15 Boer horsemen went out to meet the enemy in the hope of driving back the Matebele and thus avoiding a direct attack on the camp. The Voortrekkers were on horseback and armed with guns, whereas the Matebele were on foot and armed only with spears and shields, but this imbalance did not prevent the Matabele from advancing slowly towards the camp.

By about 3 p.m. the farmers had returned to the camp. Blockaded in, they prepared to defend themselves with a ratio of one Voortrekker to every 150 Matabele warriors. Accounts of when the attack started vary, but it seems the attack on the laager commenced at noon and lasted for about half an hour.

As the Matabele warriors surrounded the laager, they divided into three groups, outside the range of the rifles, approximately 500 metres. During this phase, another group began rounding up the livestock of the Voortrekkers. The Matabele were hungry and 80 oxen were slaughtered and eaten raw.

The Voortrekkers (pioneers) had orders not to open fire until the Ndebele were between 20 and 30 meters from the laager. During the attack, the Ndebele tried to dislodge the wagons by pulling them out of the laager or tried to overturn them, but these attempts were unsuccessful although in some places the wagons had moved by about 30 cm. Some Ndebele placed their shields on the branches to climb over these and onto the wagons, but these attempts were also unsuccessful.

The Matebele stood just beyond the musket range and then positioned themselves on either side of the camp before rushing on it in a pincer movement. Some tried to crawl through the thorn branches, trying to cut off the leather straps that tied them; others threw their spears into the camp. After a few minutes, the Matabele were so badly mauled that they fled.

== Casualties ==
Two Voortrekkers and 184 Matebele died. The bodies of the 184 Matebele were found outside the laager, but the death toll among the Matebele was about 400. In spite of their loss, the spoil was great: The Matebele plundered 50,000 sheep and goats and 5,000 cattle, including all their draft cattle.

== Aftermath ==
The Tswana (Rolong) people assisted the voortrekkers in recovering some of their cattle, but revenge attacks were also planned. On 17 January 1837, voortrekkers under the command of Hendrik Potgieter and Gerrit Maritz destroyed the town of Mosega, recovering about 6,000 cattle. In total, 15 or 16 settlements were destroyed and more than 1,000 of King Mzilikazi's warriors were killed. This was followed by the Battle of Gabeni from 4–13 November 1837, led by Potgieter and Uys.

The Marico region was eventually evacuated by the Matabele population when, in 1838, about 15,000 of them travelled across the Limpopo River to settle further north in Modern-day Matabeleland in Zimbabwe.

The three abducted children were never seen again.

== Literature ==
- Knight, Ian, ed. (1998). Boer wars. 1: 1836 - 1898 / ext by Ian Knight. Colour plates by Gerry Embleton. Osprey military Men-at-arms series (Repr ed.). London: Osprey. ISBN 978-1-85532-612-5.
