= R392 (South Africa) =

Regional route in South Africa

Regional route R392
- R392 route map

Route information
- Length: 225 km (140 mi)

Major junctions
- North end: R393 / R726 near Sterkspruit
- R58 near Lady Grey; R56 in Dordrecht; R410 near Komani
- South end: N6 / R61 in Komani

Location
- Country: South Africa

Highway system
- Numbered routes of South Africa
← R391	→ R393

The R392 is a Regional Route in South Africa that connects Sterkspruit with Komani via Lady Grey and Dordrecht.

== Route ==
The R392 begins at a junction with the south-eastern terminus of the R726 road and the northern terminus of the R393 road at the village of Masaleng, approximately 12 kilometres south-east of the Majaphuthi Bridge on the Orange River. It begins by heading southwards for 6 kilometres to the town of Sterkspruit. It then heads south-west for 38 kilometres to reach a junction with the R58 road.

The R392 joins the R58 and they are one road south-east for 26 kilometres, bypassing Lady Grey, before the R392 becomes its own road southwards. It heads south for 78 kilometres, crossing the Kraai River, to reach a junction with the R56 road north of Dordrecht. The R392 joins the R56 and they form one road southwards into the town centre as Grey Street before the R56 becomes its own road westwards while the R392 remains as Grey Street southwards.

From Dordrecht, the R392 heads southwards for 68 kilometres, crossing the White Kei River, to meet the south-western terminus of the R410 road and enter the town of Komani. It enters the town westwards as Hillside Drive, then Grey Street, then Griffiths Street, to end at a junction with the N6 national route and the R61 road (Cathcart Road) in the town centre.
