= Ennock Mlangeni =

South Africa visual artist

- Born: 1991 (age 34–35); Mamafubedu, Petrus Steyn, Free State, South Africa
- Known for: Visual art
- Notable work: Coffee-granule portrait of Black Coffee
- Movement: Contemporary art

Ennock Mlangeni (born 1991) is a South African visual artist known for his use of unconventional materials, particularly coffee granules, in his artworks.

== Early life and education ==
Mlangeni was born in Mamafubedu, formerly known as Petrus Steyn, in the Free State province of South Africa. Orphaned at a young age, he was raised by his grandmother and moved to the Zamdela township of Sasolburg, Free State.Despite lacking formal art education, he developed his skills independently, participating in school competitions and experimenting with non-traditional materials such as newspaper, flour, and coffee granules.

== Artistic career ==
Mlangeni is best known for creating artwork using coffee granules as a primary medium. His breakthrough work, a portrait of DJ Black Coffee, gained widespread attention on social media. Mlangeni has done some work for the likes of Cassper Nyovest, when he painted his swimming pool. He was also commissioned by SMEG South Africa to design a R1.3 million fridge. He founded Shack Art Studios in Zamdela, a creative space and mentorship hub for young artists. In 2023, Mlangeni launched his art stokvel which allowed buyers to contribute a certain amount for a period of one year, wherein in the end they get to own one of his artworks.

== Themes and style ==
Mlangeni's work engages with themes of resilience, identity, resourcefulness, and community.He often uses everyday or recycled materials, highlighting creativity under resource constraints and transforming ordinary objects into high-impact artworks.

== Notable works and exhibitions ==
- Coffee-granule portrait of DJ Black Coffee: viral work that helped establish his career.
- The Butterfly Finds Its Wings: online exhibition at Uitstalling Art Gallery (Belgium), August–October 2020.
- NESCAFÉ Room mural, Sandton City, Johannesburg, South Africa ,June 2024.
- All That Glitters is Not Gold: A solo exhibition at Uitstalling Villa in Genk, Belgium, which ran from December 3, 2022, to January 29, 2023.
- Hybrid III: Summer at The Villa: A group exhibition at Uitstalling Villa in Genk, Belgium, from July 14 to August 14, 2022.
- SZAL: An exhibition at MAD Gallery in Poznan, Poland, from May 26 to July 31, 2022.

== Community impact ==
Mlangeni actively mentors young artists through his studio, emphasizing creative development and opportunities for under-resourced youth.

== Awards and recognition ==
- Bic® Art Master talent search 2018.
- Sasol Techno X: Youth Engagement Award in 2023.

== See also ==
- South African art
- Contemporary African art
- List of South African artists
- Nelson Makamo
- Zanele Muholi
- William Kentridge
