= Arlington, South Africa =

Arlington
- Location within Free State (South African province) Location within South Africa
- Coordinates: 28°02′S 27°51′E
- Country: South Africa
- Province: Free State
- District: Thabo Mofutsanyane
- Municipality: Nketoana

Area
  - Total: 6.3 km^{2} (2.4 sq mi)

Population (2011)
  - Total: 3,935
  - Density: 620/km^{2} (1,600/sq mi)

Racial makeup (2011)
  - Black African: 98.1%
  - Coloured: 0.2%
  - Indian/Asian: 0.2%
  - White: 1.3%
  - Other: 0.2%

First languages (2011)
  - Sotho: 88.3%
  - Afrikaans: 3.8%
  - Sign language: 3.1%
  - Zulu: 2.0%
  - Other: 2.7%
- Time zone: UTC+2 (SAST)
- Postal code (street): 9602
- PO box: 9602
- Area code: 058

Arlington is a small farming town in the Free State province of South Africa. It was established as an important railway link between Lindley and Senekal.

== Geography and layout ==
Arlington (like all Free State towns) features a racially segregated geography due to the policies of apartheid. This is evidenced by the fact that the white population live in the actual town of Arlington while the non-white (almost exclusively black) community lives in the neighboring township of Leratswana, which is currently being greatly extended.

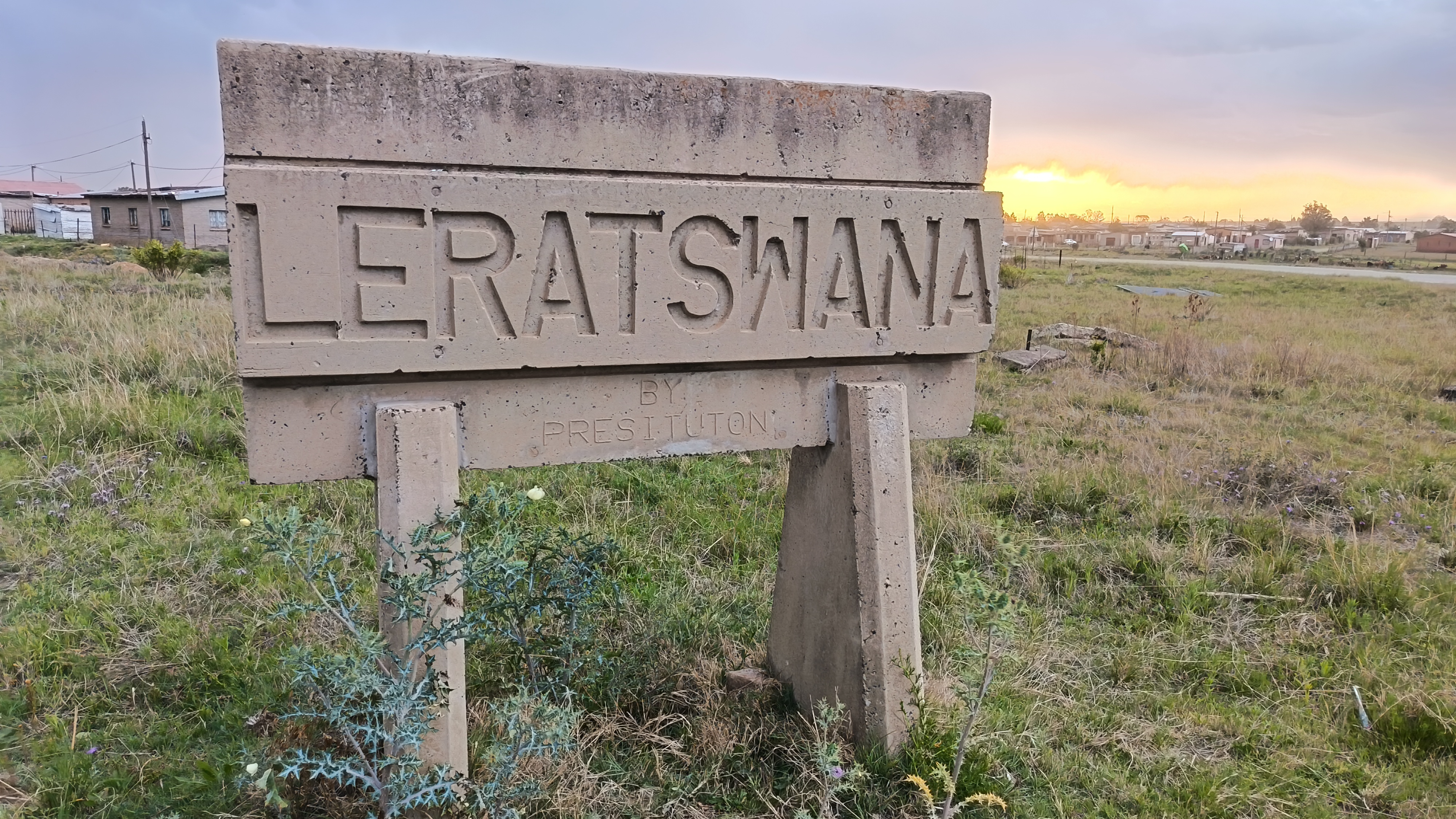
Leratswana, Arlington,Free State, South Africa.

== Transport ==
=== Railway ===
Arlington is vital for its railway location. It lies at the junction of two railway lines, one stretching from Lindley to Senekal, and another connecting Bethlehem and Steynsrus.

=== Road ===
Arlington lies on the R707, which actually separates Arlington from Leratswana. This road connects the towns of Lindley and Senekal.
