= Sterkspruit Civic Association =

Political party in South Africa

- National Assembly seats: 0 / 400
- Provincial Legislatures: 0 / 430

The Sterkspruit Civic Association (SCA) is a political party based in Sterkspruit in the Eastern Cape, South Africa.

The party wishes the town of Sterkspruit to secede from the Senqu Local Municipality (headquartered in Lady Grey 45 km away) and form its own municipality, citing corruption by the African National Congress-led municipality and the sidelining of Sterkspruit with service delivery.

In February 2013, protests led by the organisation resulted in the town shutting down for two weeks. In 2014, the party stated that it would boycott the 2019 South African general election and supporters denied access by Independent Electoral Commission officials to polling stations.

The party has contested elections in Senqu, winning eight seats in 2016, and two in 2021.

== Election results ==
=== Municipal elections ===
Election	Votes	%
2021	25,621	0.07%
