= Nketoana Local Municipality =

Coordinates: 27°48′06″S 28°26′42″E

Nketoana
- Local municipality
- Seal

- Location in the Free State
- Country: South Africa
- Province: Free State
- District: Thabo Mofutsanyane
- Seat: Reitz
- Wards: 9

Government
  - Type: Municipal council

Area
  - Total: 5,611 km^{2} (2,166 sq mi)

Population (2022)
  - Total: 66,488
  - Density: 11.85/km^{2} (30.69/sq mi)

Racial makeup (2022)
  - Black African: 90.4%
  - Coloured: 0.2%
  - Indian/Asian: 0.3%
  - White: 8.9%

First languages (2011)
  - Sotho: 75.9%
  - Zulu: 10.7%
  - Afrikaans: 8.7%
  - Sign language: 1.7%
  - Other: 3%
- Time zone: UTC+2 (SAST)
- Municipal code: FS193

Nketoana Municipality (Sotho: Masepala wa Nketoana; Zulu: UMasipala wase Nketoana) is a local municipality within the Thabo Mofutsanyane District Municipality, in the Free State province of South Africa.

== Main places ==
The 2001 census divided the municipality into the following main places:

Place	Code	Area (km^{2})	Population	Most spoken language
Arlington	41401	5.51	222	Sotho
Cremona	41402	0.46	2,021	Sotho
Leratswana	41403	0.82	3,429	Sotho
Lindley	41404	21.07	1,621	Afrikaans
Mamafubedu	41405	1.38	8,121	Sotho
Ntha	41407	2.16	8,500	Sotho
Petrus Steyn	41408	9.74	1,163	Afrikaans
Petsana	41409	2.76	13,670	Sotho
Reitz	41410	6.51	1,781	Afrikaans
Remainder of the municipality	41406	5,560.92	21,423	Sotho

== Politics ==
The municipal council consists of eighteen members elected by mixed-member proportional representation. Nine councillors are elected by first-past-the-post voting in nine wards, while the remaining nine are chosen from party lists so that the total number of party representatives is proportional to the number of votes received.

In the 2026 South African municipal elections the ANC lost its majority, but remains the largest party with nine seats.

The following table shows the results of the 2026 election.

Party	Ward			List			Total seats
Party	Votes	%	Seats	Votes	%	Seats	Total seats
African National Congress	8,190	49.40	9	8,013	48.77	0	9
Democratic Alliance	3,487	21.03	0	3,462	21.07	4	4
African Content Movement	1,784	10.76	0	1,860	11.32	2	2
Freedom Front Plus	1,148	6.92	0	1,155	7.03	1	1
Economic Freedom Fighters	859	5.18	0	859	5.23	1	1
African Congress for Transformation	341	2.06	0	359	2.19	1	1
10 other parties	771	4.65	0	722	4.39	0	0
Total	16,580	100.00	9	16,430	100.00	9	18
Valid votes	16,580	97.63		16,430	97.95		
Invalid/blank votes	402	2.37		344	2.05		
Total votes	16,982	100.00		16,774	100.00		
Registered voters/turnout	32,883	51.64		32,883	51.01		

== Corruption and service delivery protests ==
In 2019, residents of Mamafubedu torched the house of mayor Mamikie Mokoena, accusing her of failing to deliver water for a week to residents of Mandela Park. Allegations of tender corruption arose involving a contractor linked to the mayor and her cousin.

In June 2024, the Democratic Alliance accused to municipality of purchasing a truck for R2.3 million in May 2023, but never used it, leaving it parked at the municipal offices.

In August 2024 Mamiki Mokoena was accused of using a rented car which cost her municipality R100,000 in a single month. The municipality suffered a net loss of R170m for the period ended on 30 June 2023 and its liabilities exceeded its assets by R740m. There was also R47,6m in fruitless and wasteful expenditure in the 2022/23 financial year, which was due to interest and penalties on overdue accounts.

In September 2024, the Economic Freedom Fighters in the Free State opened a criminal case against mayor Maditsoako Mamiki Mokoena related to the car hire. Nketoana Local Municipality municipal manager and the Municipal Public Accounts Committee (MPAC) have been requested to open a criminal case against Baleri ba Aforikaand investigate the alleged irregularities in the procurement processes over the supply and delivery of Personal Protective Equipment.

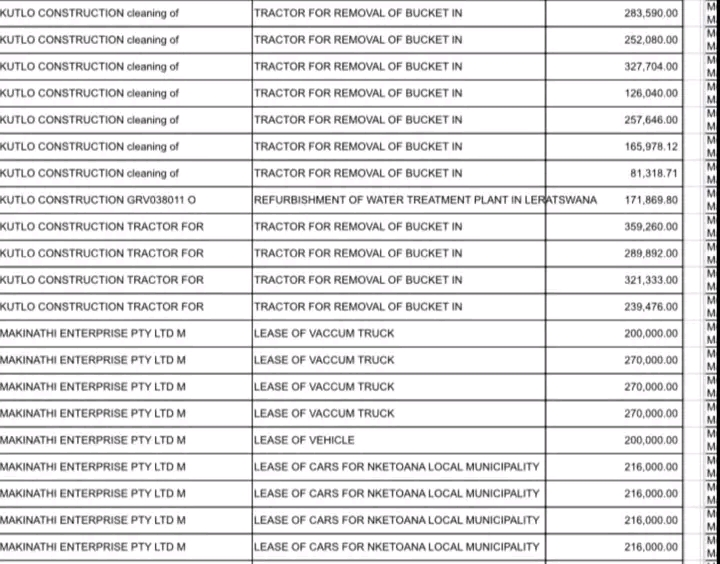
Nketoana Local Municipality audit reports

In August 2024, Disebo Motaung, a director at the municipality, came under fire after making a ‘kill the boer’ comment, referring to Dubul' ibhunu on a senior managers WhatsApp group. The matter was reported to the South African Police Service for investigation and then referred to the SA Human Rights Commission. Fraud case was opened against Nketoana municipality speaker for ‘suspect travel claims’ in the same month.

In September 2024 the mayor faced R17m nepotism allegations. On 8 October 2024 top municipal employee was charged with fraud after the allegation of approving a car allowance for unqualified employee.

On 24 October 2024 municipal manager Mokete Nhlapo suspended one of the general employee Mangaliso Hlongwane who accused him of fraud and corruption.

On the 10th April 2025 Nketoana local municipality charged one of its employees for the information that was leaked on social media.

In May 2025 the municipality was in the news for its allegedly irregular appointments. It was reported that the municipality advertised 43 open vacancies but ended up hiring 71 people, most of whom were never interviewed, while some were friends and family of the municipal employees. Nketoana has since turned to the high court to have the re-instatement of general workers dismissed. As of July 2025, Nketoana was one of seven worst-run municipalities in the country due to bad administration that cost the municipality over R500 million . In August 2025, The ANC Provincial Executive Committee resolved to fire leaders in the underperforming local governments to address governance failures, corruption, and service delivery challenges ahead of the 2026 local elections.Nketoana is one of those municipalities affected.

In September 2025 ,Nketoana Local Municipality mayor and municipal speaker resigned from their positions. This comes after the corruption that is going on at the municipality.
