= R707 (South Africa) =

Regional route in South Africa

Regional route R707

Route information
- Length: 195 km (121 mi)

Major junctions
- North-east end: R34 west of Frankfort
- R57 at Petrus Steyn; R724 south of Petrus Steyn; R725 near Lindley; R76 in Lindley; N5 / R70 in Senekal
- South-west end: R708 at Marquard

Location
- Country: South Africa
- Major cities: Frankfort, Petrus Steyn, Lindley, Arlington, Senekal, Marquard

Highway system
- Numbered routes of South Africa
← R706	→ R708

The R707 is a Regional Route in Free State, South Africa that connects Frankfort with Marquard via Petrus Steyn, Lindley, Arlington and Senekal.

== Route ==
Its north-eastern terminus is a junction with the R34 route just west of Frankfort. From there, it runs south-west for 55 kilometres to the town of Petrus Steyn, where it meets the R57 route east of the town centre. The R707 and R57 are co-signed southwards for 2 kilometres before the R707 becomes its own road to the south-west. Just after splitting from the R57, the R707 meets the northern terminus of the R724 route.

It continues south-west for 30 kilometres to meet the southern terminus of the R725 route and enter the town of Lindley. After passing through Lindley southwards, it crosses the R76 route south of the town. The route continues south-west from Lindley for 52 kilometres, through Arlington, to reach a junction with the N5 national route and the R70 route east of Senekal.

All three routes are co-signed westwards for eight kilometres, through Senekal Central, as Voortrekker Street. In Senekal West, as the R70 becomes the road northwards and the N5 remains on the westerly road, the R707 becomes the road to the south-west from this junction. It heads for 43 kilometres south-west to end in Marquard at an intersection with the R708 route.
