= Senqu Local Municipality elections =

The Senqu Local Municipality council consists of thirty-four members elected by mixed-member proportional representation. Seventeen councillors are elected by first-past-the-post voting in seventeen wards, while the remaining seventeen are chosen from party lists so that the total number of party representatives is proportional to the number of votes received. In the election of 1 November 2021 the African National Congress (ANC) won a majority of twenty-five seats.

== Results ==
The following table shows the composition of the council after past elections.

Event	ANC	DA	EFF	PAC	SCA	UDM	Other	Total
2000 election	29	2	-	1	-	-	0	32
2006 election	29	1	-	1	-	1	0	32
2011 election	32	2	-	2	-	1	0	37
2016 election	23	2	1	-	8	0	0	34
2021 election	25	1	4	1	2	1	0	34

== December 2000 election ==
The following table shows the results of the 2000 election.

Party	Ward			List			Total seats
Party	Votes	%	Seats	Votes	%	Seats	Total seats
African National Congress	21,132	88.15	16	23,550	87.68	13	29
Democratic Alliance	830	3.46	0	2,047	7.62	2	2
Pan Africanist Congress of Azania	1,360	5.67	0	1,263	4.70	1	1
Independent candidates	651	2.72	0				0
Total	23,973	100.00	16	26,860	100.00	16	32
Valid votes	23,973	96.96		26,860	96.37		
Invalid/blank votes	751	3.04		1,012	3.63		
Total votes	24,724	100.00		27,872	100.00		
Registered voters/turnout	53,501	46.21		53,501	52.10		

== March 2006 election ==
The following table shows the results of the 2006 election.

Party	Ward			List			Total seats
Party	Votes	%	Seats	Votes	%	Seats	Total seats
African National Congress	33,854	91.79	16	34,315	92.65	13	29
Democratic Alliance	1,010	2.74	0	1,011	2.73	1	1
Pan Africanist Congress of Azania	1,033	2.80	0	733	1.98	1	1
United Democratic Movement	641	1.74	0	978	2.64	1	1
Independent candidates	344	0.93	0				0
Total	36,882	100.00	16	37,037	100.00	16	32
Valid votes	36,882	97.71		37,037	98.05		
Invalid/blank votes	866	2.29		735	1.95		
Total votes	37,748	100.00		37,772	100.00		
Registered voters/turnout	61,368	61.51		61,368	61.55		

== May 2011 election ==
The following table shows the results of the 2011 election.

Party	Ward			List			Total seats
Party	Votes	%	Seats	Votes	%	Seats	Total seats
African National Congress	31,122	85.63	19	31,744	87.08	13	32
Democratic Alliance	2,442	6.72	0	2,322	6.37	2	2
Pan Africanist Congress of Azania	2,023	5.57	0	1,838	5.04	2	2
United Democratic Movement	406	1.12	0	456	1.25	1	1
Independent candidates	233	0.64	0				0
United Residents Front	118	0.32	0	94	0.26	0	0
Total	36,344	100.00	19	36,454	100.00	18	37
Valid votes	36,344	97.33		36,454	98.07		
Invalid/blank votes	996	2.67		718	1.93		
Total votes	37,340	100.00		37,172	100.00		
Registered voters/turnout	62,646	59.60		62,646	59.34		

== August 2016 election ==
The following table shows the results of the 2016 election.

Party	Ward			List			Total seats
Party	Votes	%	Seats	Votes	%	Seats	Total seats
African National Congress	24,725	67.19	17	25,019	68.34	6	23
Sterkspruit Civic Association	8,478	23.04	0	8,518	23.27	8	8
Democratic Alliance	1,488	4.04	0	1,519	4.15	2	2
Economic Freedom Fighters	1,371	3.73	0	1,128	3.08	1	1
Independent candidates	536	1.46	0				0
United Democratic Movement	44	0.12	0	271	0.74	0	0
Sterkspruit Development Forum	158	0.43	0	155	0.42	0	0
Total	36,800	100.00	17	36,610	100.00	17	34
Valid votes	36,800	98.14		36,610	97.99		
Invalid/blank votes	699	1.86		751	2.01		
Total votes	37,499	100.00		37,361	100.00		
Registered voters/turnout	64,675	57.98		64,675	57.77		

== November 2021 election ==
The following table shows the results of the 2021 election.

Party	Ward			List			Total seats
Party	Votes	%	Seats	Votes	%	Seats	Total seats
African National Congress	19,702	72.23	17	20,272	74.22	8	25
Economic Freedom Fighters	2,992	10.97	0	3,125	11.44	4	4
Sterkspruit Civic Association	1,061	3.89	0	1,221	4.47	2	2
Democratic Alliance	875	3.21	0	941	3.45	1	1
Pan Africanist Congress of Azania	508	1.86	0	536	1.96	1	1
Independent candidates	1,010	3.70	0				0
United Democratic Movement	260	0.95	0	363	1.33	1	1
Freedom Front Plus	313	1.15	0	285	1.04	0	0
African Transformation Movement	292	1.07	0	247	0.90	0	0
African People's Convention	188	0.69	0	182	0.67	0	0
Arusha Economic Coalition	77	0.28	0	140	0.51	0	0
Total	27,278	100.00	17	27,312	100.00	17	34
Valid votes	27,278	97.76		27,312	97.78		
Invalid/blank votes	624	2.24		620	2.22		
Total votes	27,902	100.00		27,932	100.00		
Registered voters/turnout	60,187	46.36		60,187	46.41		

=== By-elections from November 2021 ===
The following by-elections were held to fill vacant ward seats in the period from November 2021.

19 July 2023	5	African National Congress	African National Congress
