= Twin Mosia =

South African cultural activist (born 1984)

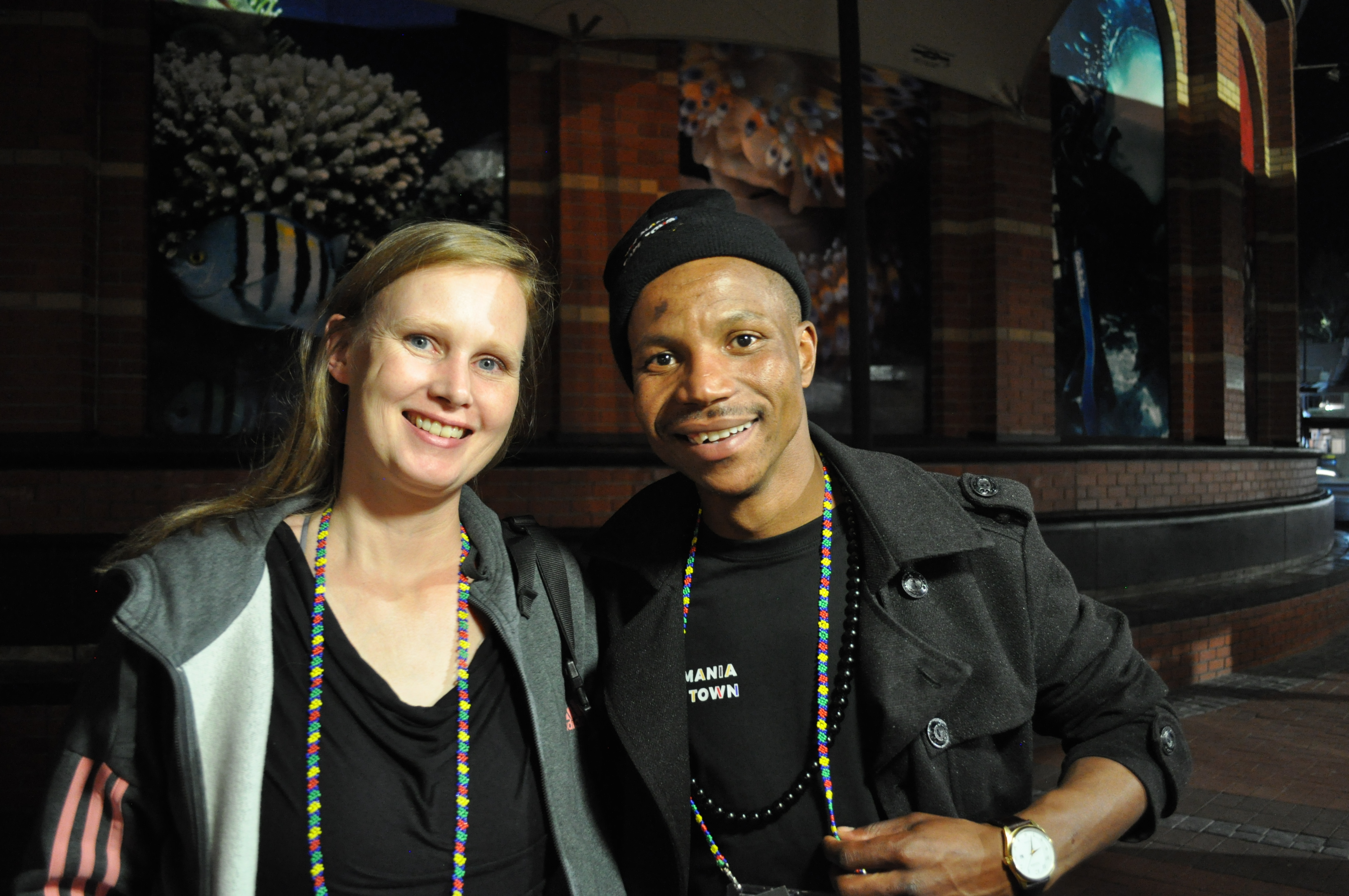
- Twin Mosia (right) with a Wikimedian at the Wikimania 2018 in Cape Town, South Africa
- Born: Twin Mawela Mosia; Mamafubedu, Petrus Steyn, Free State, South Africa
- Education: Isizwe Setjhaba High School
- Occupations: Museum curator, cultural activist, artist
- Years active: 2010s–present
- Organization: Rhino Heritage Park
- Known for: Founding the Elandskop Museum; Reenactment of the Anglo-Boer War; Reenactment of the Free State-Basotho Wars
- Notable work: Anglo-Boer War Museum (curator); Elandskop Museum; Rhino Heritage community park development
- Awards: National Heritage Council Golden Shield (2016); Mail and Guardian 200 Young South Africans (2017); South Africa National Kudu Award (2017); Heritage Association of South Africa (2016); News 24 100 Young Mandela (2018)

Twin Mawela Mosia is a South African museum curator and Mosotho cultural activist from Mamafubedu in the Free State. His grassroots work focuses on historical preservation, heritage tourism and knowledge dissemination.

Mosia made headlines in 2014 for his participation in reenactments of the Anglo-Boer War (1899–1902) and the Free State–Basotho Wars (1858–1868), notably becoming the first black South African to take part in such reenactments, challenging the traditional racial exclusions from these historical narratives. He began participating in the war reenactments in 2013 after he met Dr. Van Zyl at the Anglo-Boer War Museum in Bloemfontein, who encouraged him to pursue his passion for history and heritage, and he became known as the first black South African to portray roles in these kinds of reenactments.

== Background and career ==
Despite facing harsh socio-economic challenges, including living in a shack, Mosia has become a local hero in Mamafubedu for his work in reenacting South African historical wars, founding a virtual museum, and launching conservation and arts projects to uplift his community.

Born and raised in Mamafubedu, Mosia developed a deep interest in South African history and culture from an early age, and his passion for heritage and storytelling would later develop into the prominent role of preserving historical and cultural heritage of his Basotho community.

He first worked as a gardener in Vereeniging before becoming a miner at Anglo Platinum in Mokopane. He then moved to Kolomela Mine at Postmasburg before quitting in 2015 to focus in heritage and museums.

Through reenactments, educational programs, and digital exhibitions, Mosia has brought awareness to underrepresented narratives in South African history, particularly the role played by Black South Africans during the wars.

=== Museum and heritage work ===
Mosia is the founder of the Elandskop Outdoor Museum, a heritage initiative that was earmarked at a vandalized Transnet train station in Petrus Steyn. As the state parastatal was reluctant in giving Mosia and his organization permission to use their buildings, Mosia changed course and worked on what they called Rhino Heritage Park. Rhino Heritage Park is a 12-hectare urban park established in 2020, in line with the museum's goals and objectives to protect, conserve, and preserve the natural environment and habitat and to provide a natural retreat within Mamafubedu. The park features walking trails that wind through both wooded areas and open fields. Key amenities include an outdoor museum, an art gallery, permanent exhibitions, a playground, an event area, a campsite, an orchard, and a declared heritage site.

He first gained recognition through his participation in reenactments of the Anglo-Boer War (1899–1902) and Basotho Wars (1858–1868)—becoming one of the first Black South Africans to portray these significant historical events. His work highlights the often-overlooked contributions of Black people during these conflicts.

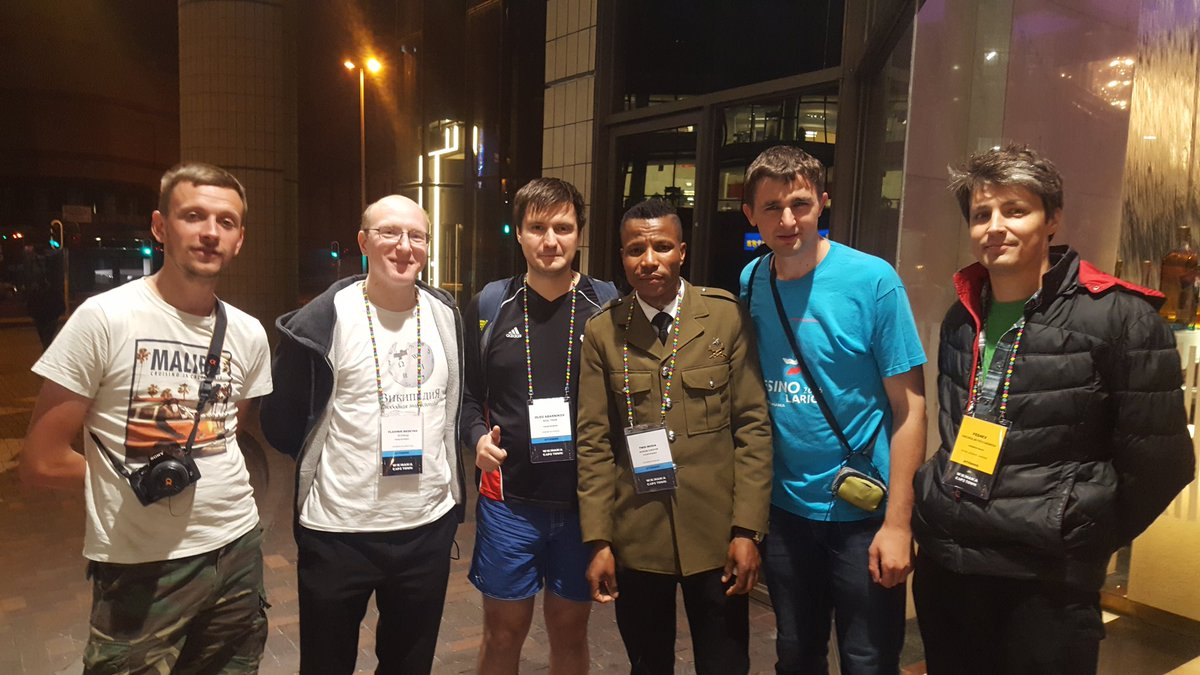
Twin Mosia with Wikimania 2018 participants in Cape Town.

In 2013, Mosia met Dr. Van Zyl at the Anglo-Boer War Museum in Bloemfontein and from there realized his dreams as a heritage preserver. In 2015 Mosia was invited to give a lecture at Sol Plaatje University and recruited the students to feature in a documentary shot at the Magersfontein battlefield. He has since been featured in two documentaries in the Netherlands, called Goede Hoop ("Good Hope") and Black, White & Khaki. The Goede Hoop was shown at Rijksmuseum in Amsterdam.

Mosia is an alumnus of the 2018 Global Cultural Leadership Programme held in Amsterdam, the Netherlands, in 2018 and in Brussels, Belgium in 2019. Organised by Goethe-Institut in partnership with the Cultural Diplomacy, European Union, British Council, BORAZ Centre for Fine Arts Brussels, EUNIC Global, European Cultural Foundation, and Institut Francais, the Global Cultural Leadership Programme brought 40 young world cultural leaders in arts, heritage, culture, museums, environment, films, theater, and music together to discuss pressing global issues and possible solutions through networking, partnerships, and meaningful collaborations.

He is also an American Express Academy for Emerging Innovators 2019 alumnus held in Nairobi, Kenya and lastly the Independent Curators International - Curatorial Intensive 2019 held in Cape Town. In 2018, he was announced as Veldskoen Shoes ambassador.

In 2024, Mosia was appointed to serve on the Free State Provincial Heritage Resources Authority council and to advise the MEC of Free State Department of Arts and Culture.

== Awards and achievements ==
- National Heritage Council Golden Shield Award 2016.
- Heritage Association of South Africa Gold Medal 2016.
- South African National Parks Kudu Award 2017.
- Mail and Guardian 200 Top Young South Africans 2017.
- News24 100 Young Mandelas 2018.
- Presidential Award 2018.
- Africa Youth Awards -Africa Youth of The Year (Male) Finalist 2018.
- The Young Independents SADC Top 100 of 2018: Trailblazer.
- Eco Logic Award 2018 finalist.
- Inside Education 100 Shining Stars 2020.
