= R76 =

R76 may refer to:

- R76 (South Africa), a road
- HMS Consort (R76), a destroyer of the Royal Navy
- HMS Pioneer (R76), or HMS Mars (R76), an aircraft carrier of the Royal Navy
