= Rossouw, South Africa =

Rossouw
- Location within Eastern Cape Location within South Africa
- Coordinates: 31.168°S 27.279°E
- Country: South Africa
- Province: Eastern Cape
- District: Joe Gqabi
- Municipality: Senqu

Area
  - Total: 9.38 km^{2} (3.62 sq mi)

Population (2011)
  - Total: 284
  - Density: 30.3/km^{2} (78.4/sq mi)

Racial makeup (2011)
  - Black African: 100.0%

First languages (2011)
  - Xhosa: 94.0%
  - Sotho: 2.1%
  - English: 1.8%
  - Other: 2.1%
- Time zone: UTC+2 (SAST)
- PO box: 5437
- Area code: 045

Rossouw is a town in Joe Gqabi District Municipality in the Eastern Cape province of South Africa.
