= Senqu Local Municipality =

Coordinates: 30°42′S 27°14′E

Senqu
- Local municipality
- Seal

- Location in the Eastern Cape
- Country: South Africa
- Province: Eastern Cape
- District: Joe Gqabi
- Seat: Lady Grey
- Wards: 19

Government
  - Type: Municipal council

Area
  - Total: 7,329 km^{2} (2,830 sq mi)

Population (2011)
  - Total: 134,150
  - Density: 18.30/km^{2} (47.41/sq mi)

Racial makeup (2011)
  - Black African: 97.3%
  - Coloured: 1.2%
  - Indian/Asian: 0.2%
  - White: 1.1%

First languages (2011)
  - Xhosa: 74.3%
  - Sotho: 20.2%
  - Afrikaans: 2.4%
  - English: 1.3%
  - Other: 1.8%
- Time zone: UTC+2 (SAST)
- Municipal code: EC142

Senqu Municipality (Xhosa: uMasipala wase Senqu; Sotho: Masepala wa Senqu) is a local municipality within the Joe Gqabi District Municipality, in the Eastern Cape province of South Africa. Senqu is the Sesotho name for the Orange River.

== Main places ==
The 2001 census divided the municipality into the following main places:

Place	Code	Area (km^{2})	Population
Amaqwati	22701	62.98	4,284
Amavundla	22702	86.37	8,123
Barkly East	22703	16.10	4,292
Basoto	22704	250.74	31,727
Batlokoa	22705	127.83	5,054
Herschel	22706	4.89	561
Hlubi	22707	1,061.37	51,548
Khwezinaledi	22708	0.81	4,793
Lady Grey	22709	23.75	1,312
Mfelandawonye	22710	0.05	27
Myamane	22711	122.04	9,296
Nkululeko	22712	0.53	4,077
Polar Park	22713	0.05	630
Rhodes	22714	10.28	129
Rossouw	22715	0.66	302
Sterkspruit	22717	4.02	1,557
Zakhele	22718	0.14	377
Zola	22719	0.02	337
Remainder of the municipality	22716	4,998.12	6,736

== Politics ==
The municipal council consists of thirty-four members elected by mixed-member proportional representation. Seventeen councillors are elected by first-past-the-post voting in seventeen wards, while the remaining seventeen are chosen from party lists so that the total number of party representatives is proportional to the number of votes received. In the election of 1 November 2021 the African National Congress (ANC) won an increased majority of twenty-five seats on the council. The following table shows the results of the election.

Party	Ward			List			Total seats
Party	Votes	%	Seats	Votes	%	Seats	Total seats
African National Congress	19,702	72.23	17	20,272	74.22	8	25
Economic Freedom Fighters	2,992	10.97	0	3,125	11.44	4	4
Sterkspruit Civic Association	1,061	3.89	0	1,221	4.47	2	2
Democratic Alliance	875	3.21	0	941	3.45	1	1
Pan Africanist Congress of Azania	508	1.86	0	536	1.96	1	1
Independent candidates	1,010	3.70	0				0
United Democratic Movement	260	0.95	0	363	1.33	1	1
Freedom Front Plus	313	1.15	0	285	1.04	0	0
African Transformation Movement	292	1.07	0	247	0.90	0	0
African People's Convention	188	0.69	0	182	0.67	0	0
Arusha Economic Coalition	77	0.28	0	140	0.51	0	0
Total	27,278	100.00	17	27,312	100.00	17	34
Valid votes	27,278	97.76		27,312	97.78		
Invalid/blank votes	624	2.24		620	2.22		
Total votes	27,902	100.00		27,932	100.00		
Registered voters/turnout	60,187	46.36		60,187	46.41		
