= R393 (South Africa) =

Regional route in South Africa

Regional route R393
- R393 route map

Location
- Country: South Africa

Highway system
- Numbered routes of South Africa
← R392	→ R394

The R393 is a Regional Route in South Africa that connects Sterkspruit via the Lesotho border to the R58 near Elliot.

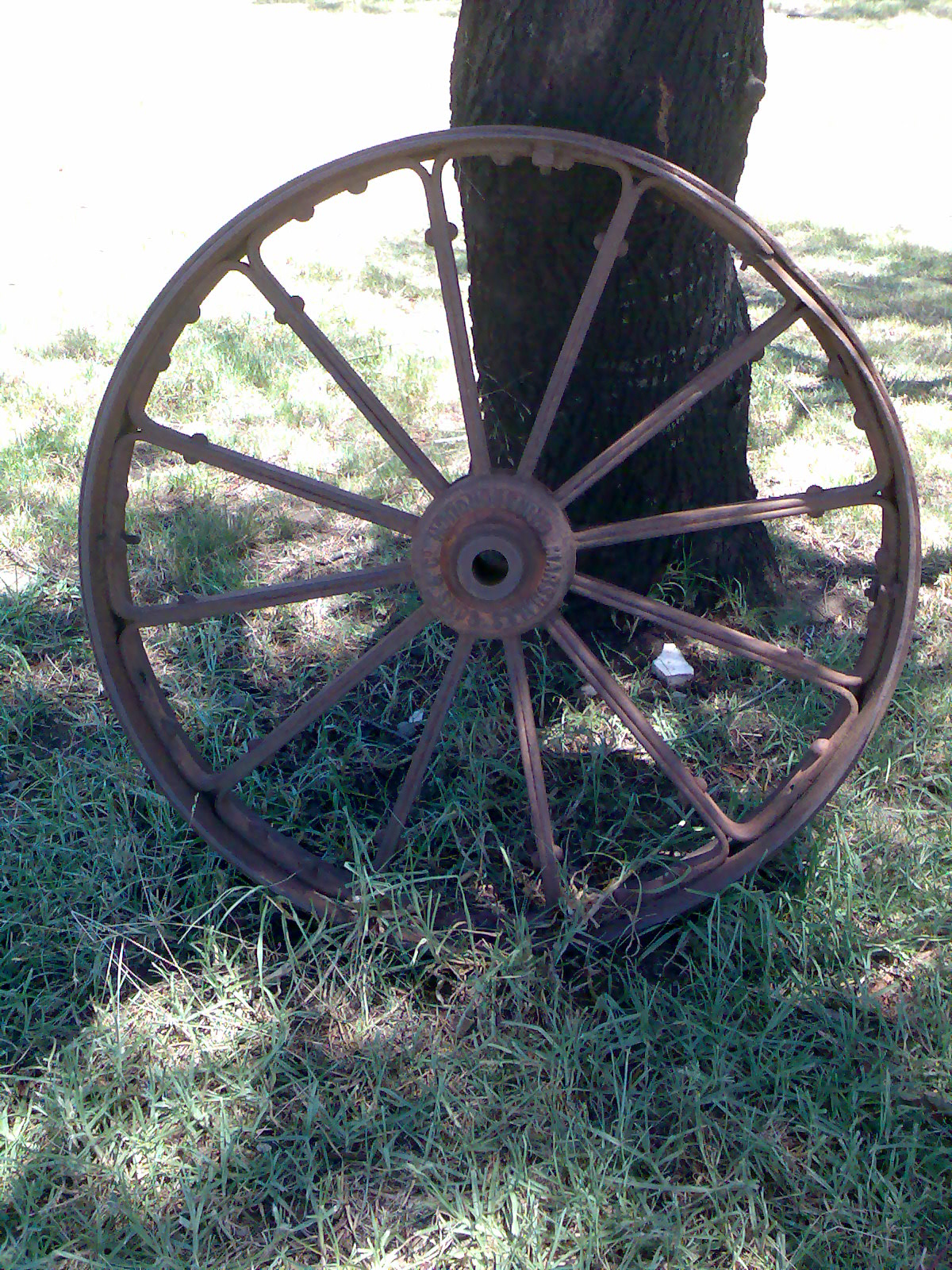
Rusted wagon wheel with metal spokes displayed near Elliot.
