= Lindley, Free State =

Lindley
- Location within Free State (South African province) Location within South Africa
- Coordinates: 27°52′S 27°55′E
- Country: South Africa
- Province: Free State
- District: Thabo Mofutsanyane
- Municipality: Nketoana
- Established: 1875

Area
  - Total: 23.0 km^{2} (8.9 sq mi)

Population (2011)
  - Total: 12,000
  - Density: 520/km^{2} (1,400/sq mi)

Racial makeup (2011)
  - Black African: 95.6%
  - Coloured: 0.3%
  - Indian/Asian: 0.3%
  - White: 3.6%
  - Other: 0.2%

First languages (2011)
  - Sotho: 83.6%
  - Zulu: 6.1%
  - Afrikaans: 5.1%
  - Sign language: 2.2%
  - Other: 3.1%
- Time zone: UTC+2 (SAST)
- Postal code (street): 9630
- PO box: 9630
- Area code: 058

Lindley is a small town situated on the banks of the Vals River in the eastern region of the Free State province of South Africa. It was named after an American missionary, Daniel Lindley, who was the first ordained minister to the Voortrekkers in Natal. Basotho call it Ntha, after the river.

The settlement of Lindley was laid out in 1875 on the farm Brandhoek and was proclaimed a town in 1878. The main route to the town is the R707. Lindley, together with its neighbouring towns of Reitz, Petrus Steyn and Arlington form the Nketoana Local Municipality. Early inhabitants were Dihoja, a group of Basotho people who lived in prehistoric stone huts or sedan Beehive stone huts found in the area. Dihoja intermarried with the Bataung who settled in the area called Matlwantlwang.

In the 2011 census, the town of Lindley proper had a population of 1,010, with 54.0% of residents identifying as Black African, 42.5% as White, 1.8% as Indian/Asian, and 1.0% as Coloured. Afrikaans was the most common first language in the town, spoken by 42.6% of the population, followed by Sotho at 40.7%. The adjacent Basotho township of Ntha, located on the other side of the R707, recorded a population of 10,990, bringing the total population of the Lindley area to 12,000.

Lindley reestablished their rugby union in 2016, after having little success since being ranked first in the Free State in 1994.

== Doornkloof Farm ==
Doornkloof Farm is located in the Lindley District and was inhabited by Voortrekker leader, Sarel Cilliers during the Great Trek. Various attractions can be found on the farm, including the farmhouse which was built by Sarel Cilliers himself. There is also a tram track that offers a unique walk through history of the farm.

== History ==
=== Leghoya huts ===
Leghoya huts or Sedan Beehive stone huts belonged to the first primitive mining people who came to the Rand but they are also found in several towns in the Lindley District including Heilbron and Arlington. Because of the materials used to build these huts, great skill was required, especially when dealing with the roof. The architecture used to create these huts was unique and could be compared to that of the Inuit. They set the scene for the passing of the Stone Age in the Free State.

=== The Lindley Affair ===
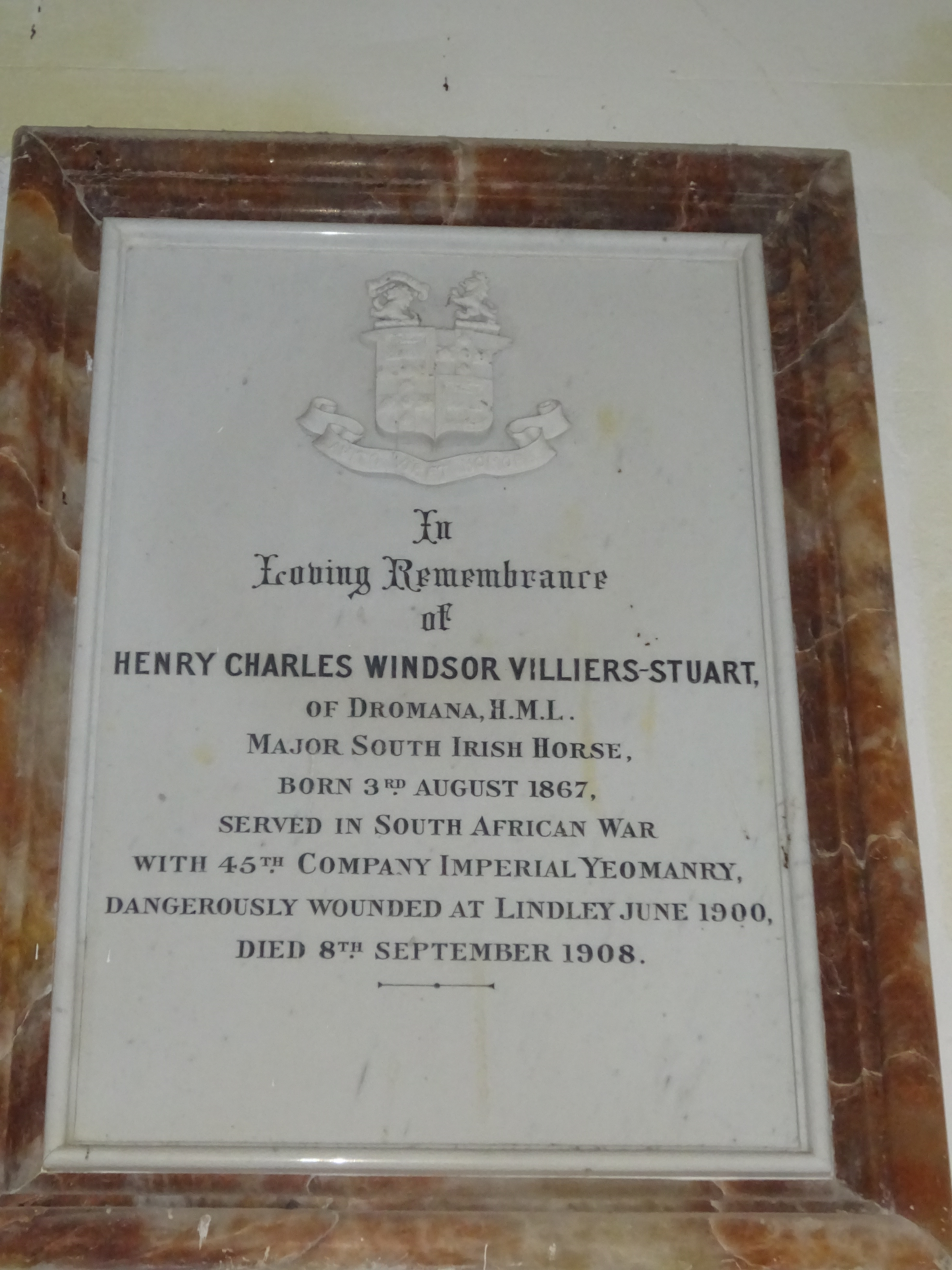
Grave of the Anglo-Irish officer Henry Charles Windsor Villiers-Stuart; it notes that he was "dangerously wounded at Lindley" while serving in the Imperial Yeomanry.

The Lindley affair was a controversial and embarrassing event (for the British) of the Boer War. The 13th battalion of the Imperial Yeomanry led by Col Basil Spragge departed by rail to join Gen Henry Edward Colvile's column. Owing to the delays in supplying the Spragge's battalion with forage, it was not possible for Spragge to join Colvile. Instead his battalion proceeded to Kroonstad where it arrived on 25 May. The route taken caused a division in the battalion: The 47th Company forded the Sand River since the railway bridge was destroyed and marched to Kroonstad, while the 45th, 46th and 54th Companies, departing a day later, crossed the river via the deviation bridge and proceeded directly by rail to Kroonstad.

Spragge, was handed a telegram, the origins of which are still a mystery. Spragge told the Court of Inquiry which investigated the Lindley affair: "I was shown a telegram to the Commandant Kroonstad from General Colvile directing me to join him with my regiment at Lindley”. Colvile denied ever having sent the telegram. It is possible that the Boers had tapped the telegraph lines and sent a bogus message to lure the Imperial Yeomanry into an ambush. It is more likely that bad staff work by British headquarters who issued the order to Spragge but did not tell Colvile. Spragg's battalion marched at dawn on the 26th and that afternoon met a party of armed Boers. The Boers claimed to be going to Kroonstad to surrender and Spragge naively disarmed them, invited them to lunch and then allowed them to proceed. The Boers promptly returned to Lindley with useful intelligence. Private Maurice Fitzgibbon of the Dublin company, son of one of Ireland's most senior judges, recalled: "The scouts of the Boer commandos at Lindley had been permitted to enter our lines to find out our numbers, our armaments and the amount of our supplies, had even had lunch with us and all this information and hospitality at the expense of a few out-of-date rifles and a few perjured oaths."

The 13th battalion of the Imperial Yeomanry marched into Lindley and came under rifle fire from the Boers. Spragg's men moved from the town to positions on koppies outside the town. After two days the Boers brought concentrated artillery fire to bear on both the koppies.

Between the two koppies was a small post of a few men, one of whom decided to wave a white flag in surrender. This man was shot by his comrades. With the southern koppie already in Boer hands, the officer in charge, under the mistaken notion that he was bound by the white flag of his subordinate, ordered a ceasefire. The remainder of the British position became untenable. Seeing the futility of further effort, Spragge also surrendered. Lord Longford, with the 45th Company to the north, and Capt Maude, with the 46th Company in the west, held out for a little longer but they too finally surrendered to Boer commander Piet de Wet, the brother of Christiaan de Wet. All firing ceased at about 2.00pm.The British casualties during the five days' fighting amounted to 80, of whom 23 were fatal. Piet de Wet bagged 530 men, including Spragge, Lord Longford, Lords Ennismore, Leitrim and Donoughmore (and the future Lord Craigavon) who were marched off to the eastern Transvaal northwards.

=== The skirmish of Leeuwkop and Bakenkop ===
Following British Major-General, Paget's, success in the Free State, Boer General, Christiaan de Wet retired to Leeuwkop, a rocky hill about ten kilometres to the south-east of Lindley where he established a new defensive position along a ridge line running north-east, which had Bakenkop (Note: location of Bakenkop 27°54′46″S 28°04′23″E) as its most prominent feature.

On 3 July Paget moved his infantry and two guns into the intervening valley towards Leeuwkop, while sending 800 of his mounted troops with six guns against Bakenkop on the left. The commander of the latter detachment, Colonel A.M. Brookfield, took his men onto a ridge 4 000 metres from his objective and returned fire on the five Boer guns which had begun to engage him.

During the ensuing conflict, an artillery officer managed to mount a horse and gallop to the rear. He came upon a detachment of South Australians, under captain A.E.M. Norton, who had been ordered to retire. These he led back to the ridge line just in time to prevent the Boers from carrying away the captured guns. When confronted with the Australians' fire, the burghers promptly retreated taking some of the captured gunners with them as prisoners. The enemy party attacking the left gun section also broke contact and withdrew. In the meantime Paget had seized Leeuwkop and was now able to direct flanking fire from his guns against the Boer artillery. De Wet soon abandoned Bakenkop and made off towards Bethlehem.

During the short but sharp battle, Major Rose and about a dozen South Australians were wounded. The Tasmanian squadron, having been kept on other duty near Lindley, did not join in the fighting until the action was in its final stages with the Boers already driven off.

=== Leeuwkop and Bakenkop Monument ===
On 13 March 2017, an Anglo-Boer War memorial honouring the dead, on both sides, was unveiled outside Lindley on a farm between Leeuwkop and Bakenkop. The monument was unveiled by historian/researcher, Dr Stimson, in honour of his grandfather, Captain A.E.M Norton, who was involved in the skirmish.

== Tourist attractions ==
Tourist attractions in Lindley include:

- a British memorial in the local cemetery to British soldiers who died on 31 May 1900 at Yeomanry Hills during the siege of Lindley,
- prehistoric stone huts of the original inhabitants of the area as well as
- a miniature replica of the Dutch Reformed Church that was erected in 1928 in memory of those who died during the Second Anglo-Boer War.

== Notable people ==
- Stella Blakemore, popular youth author in Afrikaans, who wrote series such as Maasdorp and Keurboslaan, was born in Lindley in 1906.
- Danie Craven, the famous Springbok Rugby Union player, administrator and coach was born in this town on 11 October 1910.
- General C.H. Olivier member of the Uitvoerende Raad (executive council) of the Orange Free State and signatory of the Treaty of Vereeniging that ended the Second Boer War in 1902. He is buried in Mamafubedu, Petrus Steyn where his graveyard is part of a heritage site in town.

== See also ==
- Second Boer War
- Anglo-Boer War Museum
