= Sterkspruit =

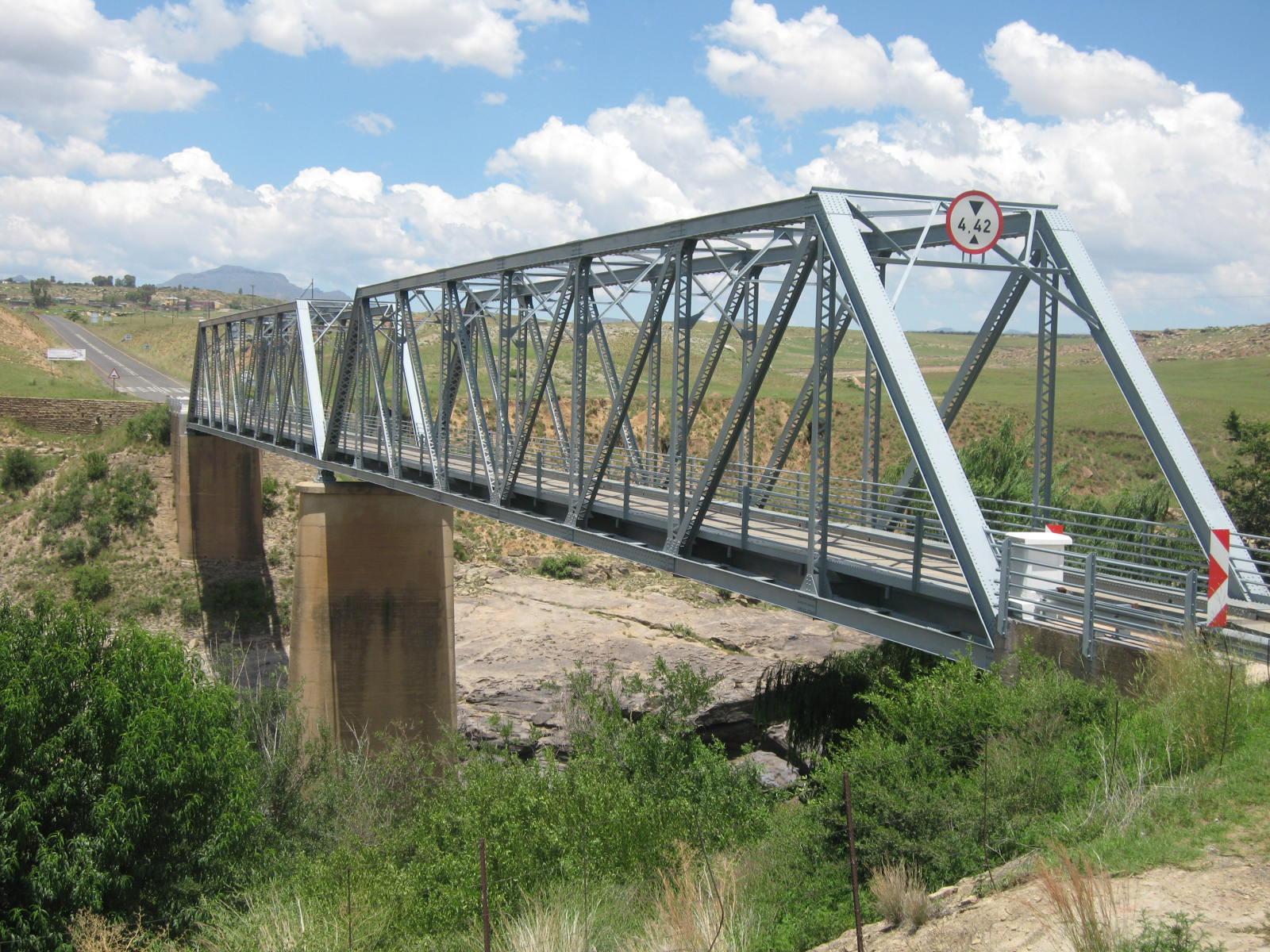
- Bridge over the Orange River near Sterkspruit

- Location within Eastern Cape Location within South Africa Location within Africa
- Coordinates: 30.524°S 27.370°E
- Country: South Africa
- Province: Eastern Cape
- District: Joe Gqabi
- Municipality: Senqu

Government
  - Councillor: Chief Mgadla, M

Area
  - Total: 4.02 km^{2} (1.55 sq mi)

Population (2011)
  - Total: 1,893
  - Density: 471/km^{2} (1,220/sq mi)

Racial makeup (2011)
  - Black African: 96.2%
  - Coloured: 0.9%
  - Indian/Asian: 2.1%
  - White: 0.4%
  - Other: 0.4%

First languages (2011)
  - Hlubi: 73.5%
  - Sotho: 14.2%
  - English: 4.3%
  - Afrikaans: 1.0%
  - Other: 7.0%
- Time zone: UTC+2 (SAST)
- Postal code (street): 9762
- PO box: 9762
- Area code: 051

Sterkspruit is a town in the Senqu Local Municipality in the Joe Gqabi District Municipality in the Eastern Cape province of South Africa.

The town is located about 45 km south-east of Zastron, 80 km north-east of Aliwal North, and 24 km from the Lesotho border. It takes its name from the Sterkspruit, the watercourse on which it is situated. The name is Afrikaans and means ‘strong stream’.

== Health ==
The town houses the Empilisweni District Hospital, a public government-funded and managed district hospital. It is a level 1 hospital with 93 usable beds. As it is situated close to Lesotho and Free State borders, it also renders health services to cross-border citizens visiting Sterkspruit.

Water quality has been a problem, with 140 babies dying in 2008 after drinking contaminated water.

== Protests ==
In 2014, the town was shut down for two weeks in protests led by the Sterkspruit Civic Association, with the goal of forming its own, separate, municipality.

== See also ==
- Senqu Local Municipality elections
