= Heilbron =

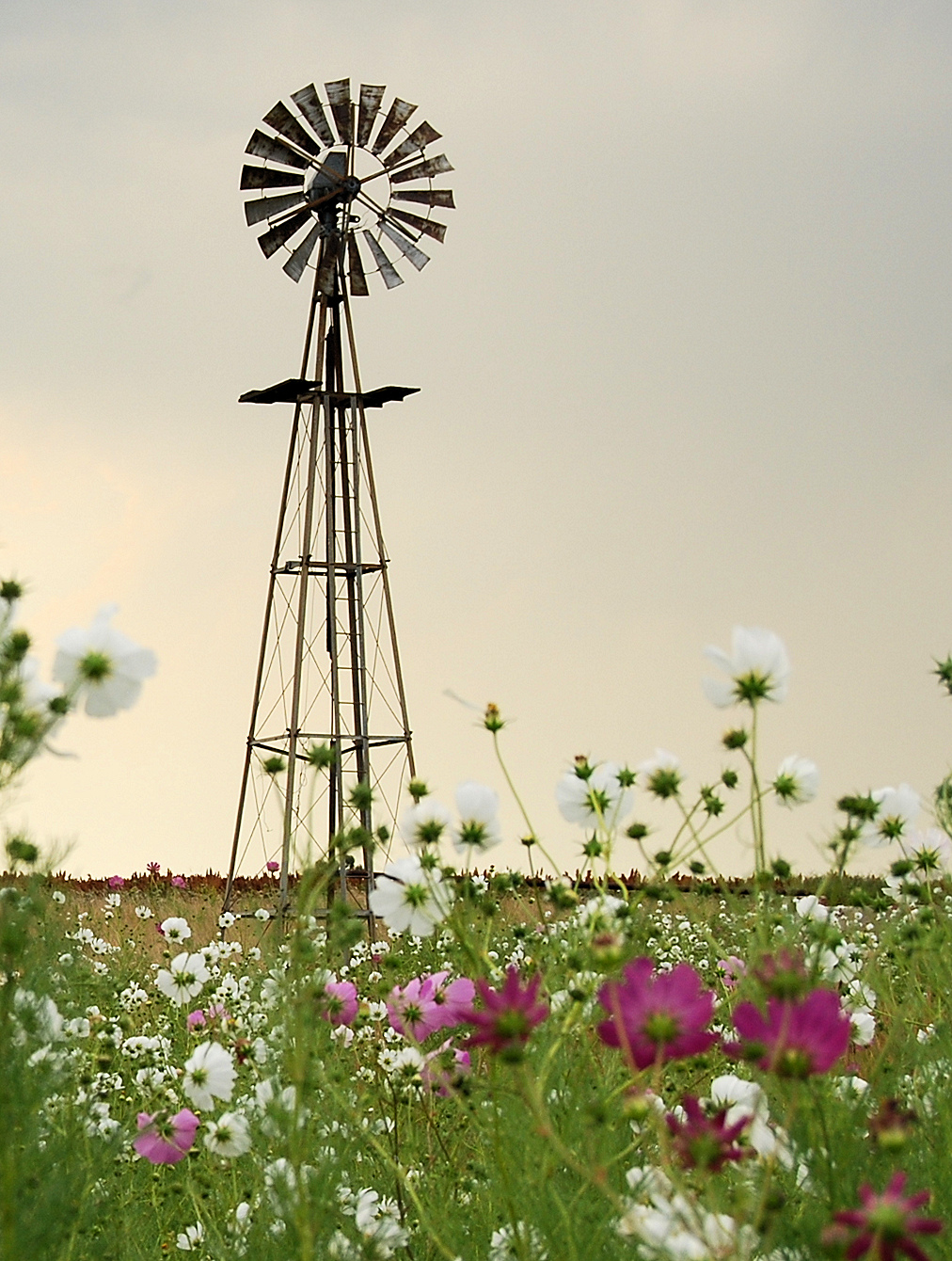

- Location within Free State (South African province) Location within South Africa
- Coordinates: 27°17′1″S 27°58′15″E
- Country: South Africa
- Province: Free State
- District: Fezile Dabi
- Municipality: Ngwathe
- Established: 1872
  - Councillor: (ANC)

Area
  - Total: 17.7 km^{2} (6.8 sq mi)
- Elevation: 1,540 m (5,050 ft)

Population (2011)
  - Total: 27,407
  - Density: 1,550/km^{2} (4,010/sq mi)

Racial makeup (2011)
  - Black African: 88.2%
  - Coloured: 5.5%
  - Indian/Asian: 0.3%
  - White: 5.6%
  - Other: 0.3%

First languages (2011)
  - Sotho: 74.9%
  - Afrikaans: 12.2%
  - Zulu: 7.2%
  - Xhosa: 1.6%
  - Other: 4.1%
- Time zone: UTC+2 (SAST)
- Postal code (street): 9650
- PO box: 9650
- Area code: +27 (0) 58
- Website: http://www.heilbron.info/

Heilbron is a town in the Free State province of South Africa which services the cattle, dairy, sorghum, sunflower and maize industries. Raw stock beneficiation occurs in leisure foods, dairy products and stock feeds. It also serves as a dormitory town for the Gauteng metropolis.

Game farming in the district grew to the extent that it is believed that game numbers reached an all-time high, evident in visiting tourist numbers. Due to its close proximity to Gauteng (60 km) the town became ever more popular to weekend tourists and city dwellers in need of a relaxing weekend filled with peace, quiet and fresh air. Popular activities are horse riding, off-road cycling, fishing, game drives, utilizing both motor vehicles and quad bikes, historical tours and affordable sporting facilities.

== History ==
In 1836, the Voortrekkers fought off the local people of Ndebele Chief Mzilikazi at the Battle of Vegkop near the present town of Heilbron. This historical site boasts a monument and a contemporary museum which are both popular stops for battle field tourists.

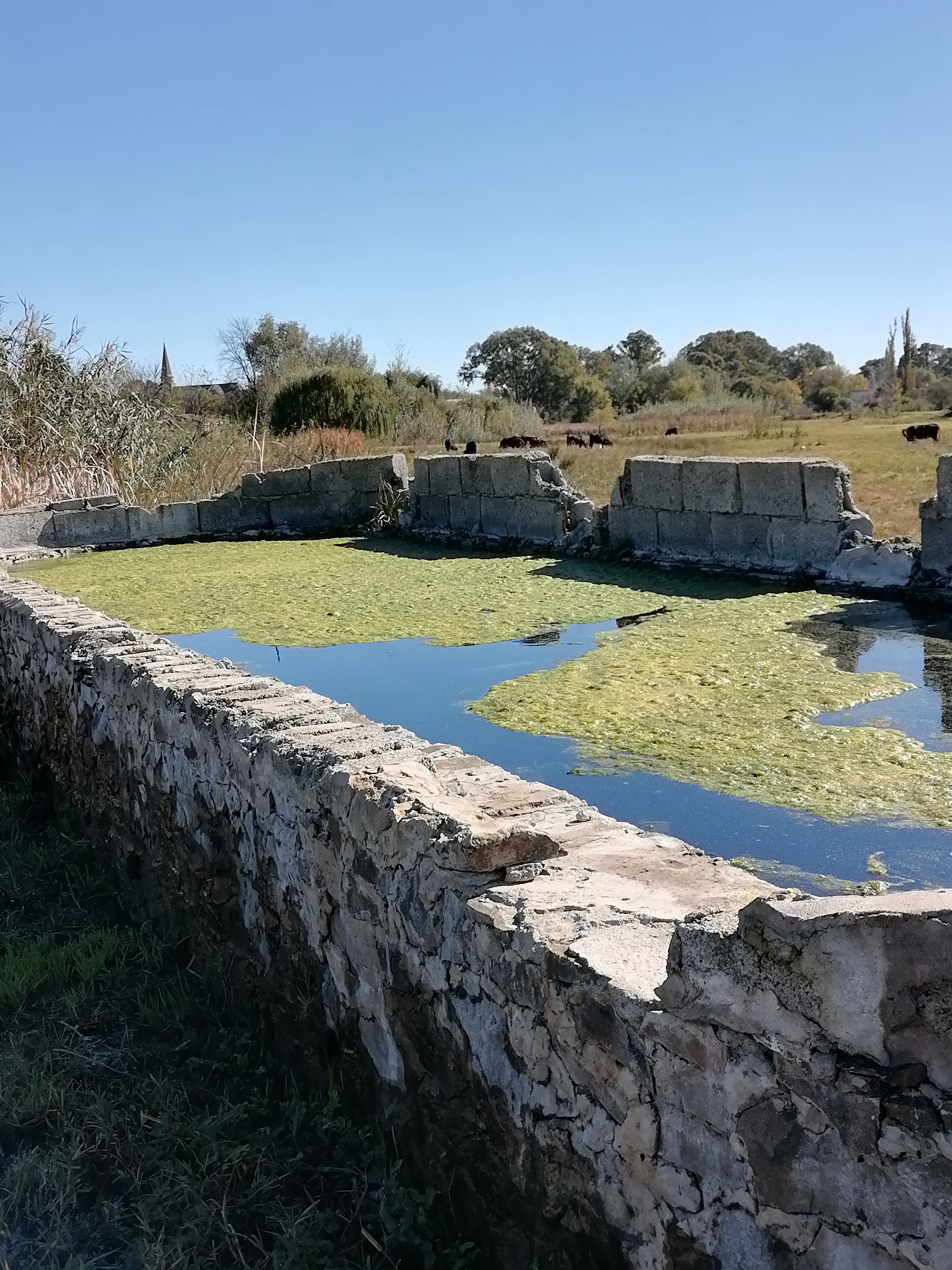
Bron van Heil, Heilbron, Phiritona.

Heilbron was officially established in 1873. The town was founded at the site of a perennial natural fountain, thus the name 'Heilbron' (Afrikaans for 'Spring of Bliss'). The fountain is the source of a small stream which runs through the town. Various small groups of people have lived on the banks of the stream for centuries.

After Bloemfontein was conquered by the British forces during the Anglo-Boer War (on 13 March 1900), Heilbron was proclaimed as the capital of the independent Boer Republic of the Orange Free State. A few weeks after the fall of Bloemfontein, Heilbron was also occupied, and President Steyn moved the capital to Frankfort, another town in the northern Free State. By 18 May 1900, the Orange Free State was defeated, annexed by Britain and renamed the "Orange River Colony". Many Boer fighters refused to surrender. The area surrounding Heilbron was rife with guerilla activity.

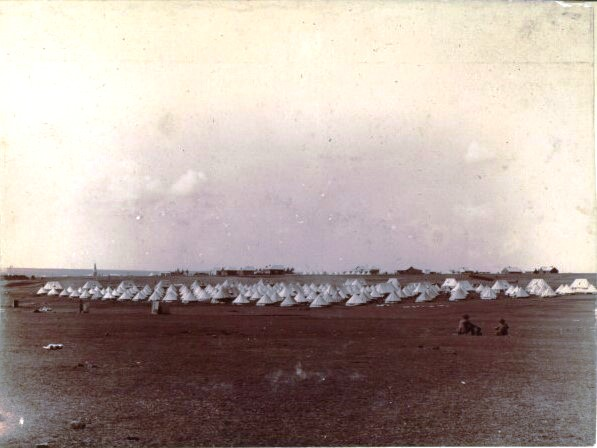
The British concentration camp of Heilbron for Whites, c.1901

In order to subdue those Boers who continued to fight, the British High Command attempted to cut the guerilla army off from its source of provisions. Boer farms were razed and concentration camps, such as the one in Heilbron, were built to house the Boer women, children and non-combatant labourers who provided support to the Boer fighters. The camps were ill-planned and thousands of Boer civilians died of starvation, disease and exposure. The black population were not spared either. Today the Heilbron concentration camp is used as a private school. A monument to commemorate the victims of the camps can be found in the town cemetery.

During the early years of its history, several Jewish citizens of Heilbron played an important role in developing the town. Many of the streets in Heilbron are thus named after prominent founding Jewish citizens. The old synagogue has been converted into a museum, by the name of "Riemland Museum".

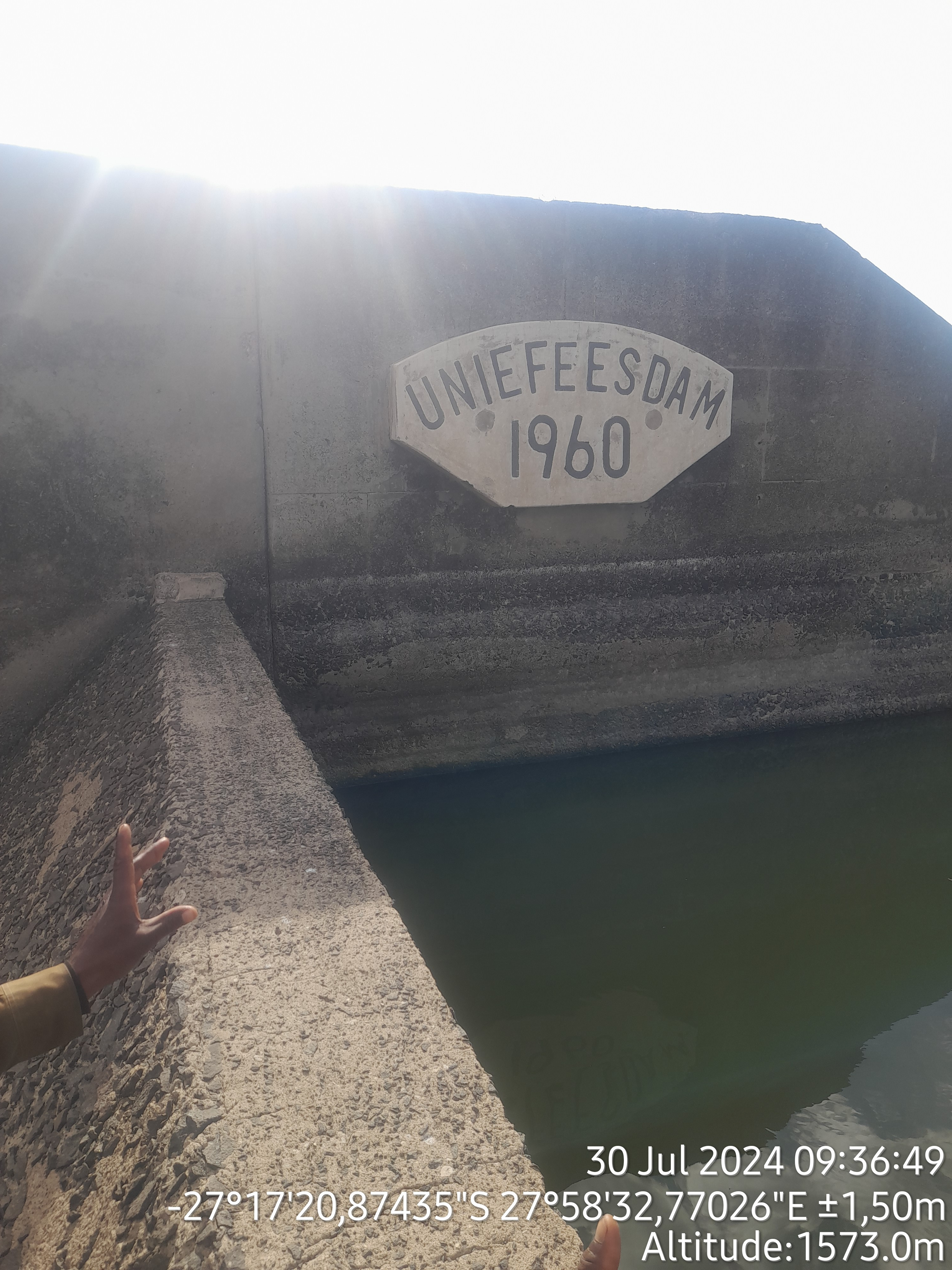
Unifeesdam in Heilbron built in 1960

== Attractions ==
=== Heilbron train station ===
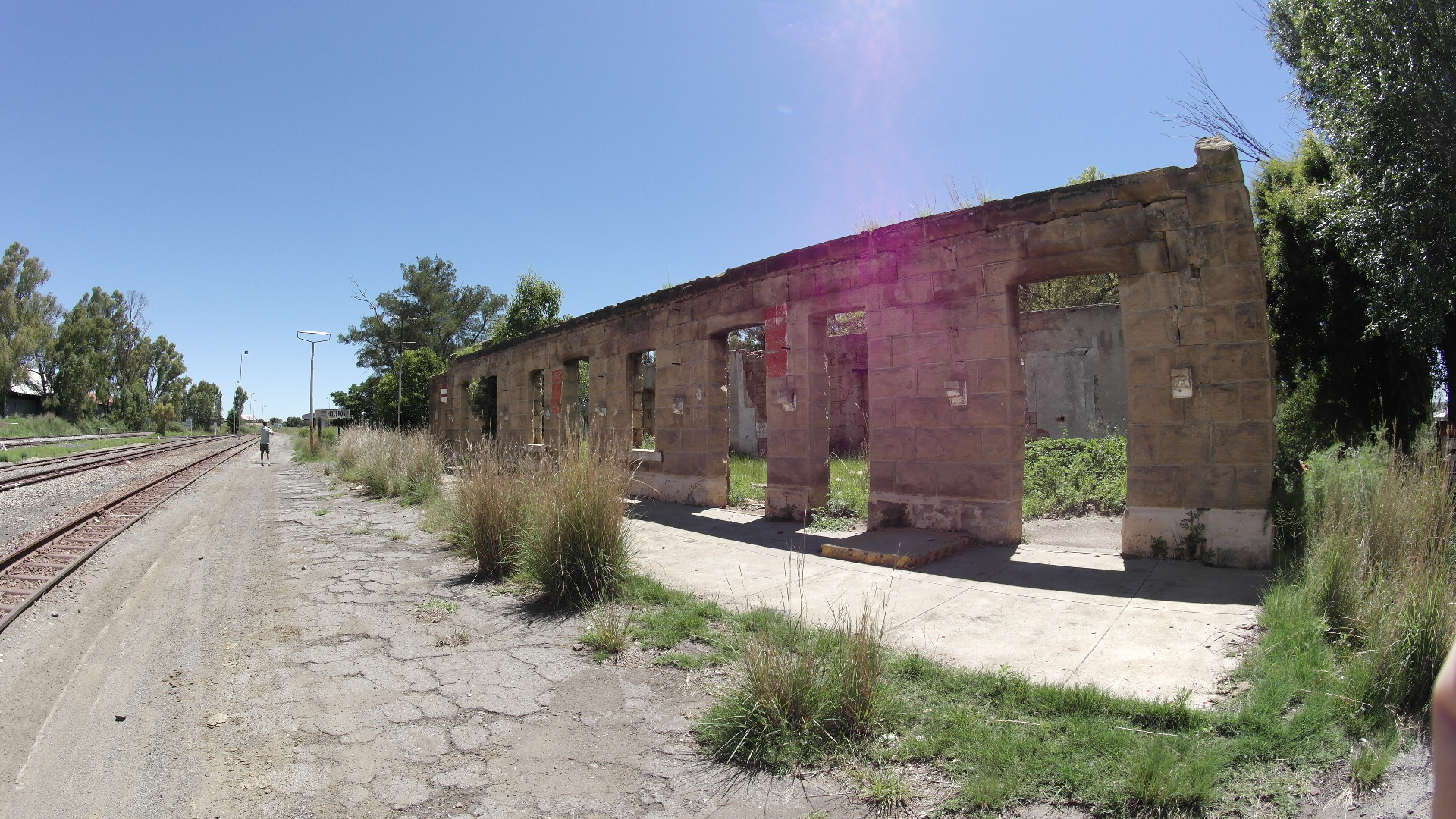
Heilbron Train Station

Heilbron railway was first laid in 1899 and connects to the link in Wolwehoek. Later the line was extended to Petrus Steyn and Lindley. The old sandstone building is a provincial heritage site.

=== NG Church ===
The congregation of Heilbron was first established in 1874, it was seceded from Kroonstad. The sandstone building of the Dutch Reformed church was inaugurated in 1885, the cornerstone was laid by President Brand in 1880. On its grounds is a monument to the Heilbron burghers killed in the Anglo-Boer war.

=== Leeuwpoort of the Weilbachs Farms ===
During the Anglo-Boer War Heilbron was for a few days the capital of the Free State. One of the houses was built by a Scottish building contractor for Johan Frederik Weilbach and his wife Catharina Johanna in 1894. During the Anglo-Boer War, the house was not burned down as many of the others were. Colonel Delzeal, the commanding officer in Heilbron, had given instruction that Johan's wife and 12 children still lived in the house and that they should not be harmed. Winston Churchill visited the farm Leeuwpoort, which was used as a base for the British officers during the war. The farms are provincial heritage sites.

=== Mother and Child Memorial ===
The Mother and Child Memorial commemorates the 787 Boer women and children who died between 1899 and 1902 in the British concentration camp at Heilbron during the Anglo-Boer War. The large cemetery serves as a stark reminder of the tragedy.

=== Corbelled Houses ===
Archeological and records conducted by Tim Maggs in 1976 provide evidence of the early Basotho settlement. The distinctive corbelled house patterns called "V" for Vegkop dates between 1600 and 1800 AD and was called "Mohlongwa-fatshe.

=== Vechtkop Battlefields, Monument and Museum ===
The Battle of Vegkop was fought between the Matebele of Mzilikazi and the Voortrekkers of Hendrik Potgieter just outside the town of Heilbron. On 16 October 1836 about 6 000 Matebele warriors attacked the laager (a camp or encampment, especially within a protective circle of wagons) of the Voortrekkers at Vechtkop. A battle ensued and 430 Matebele and two Voortrekkers were killed.

=== Riemland Museum ===
The Riemland Museum is housed in an old Jewish synagogue, which in itself tells the story of the Jewish influence on the history of the town. The museum was opened on 19 November 1986. The museum tells the history of the early hunters in the Riemland, as well as the early pioneers and settlers.

== Heilbron in literature ==
Heilbron has been featured in Dr Leonard Lotzof's autobiographic book Spilt Milk.

== People from Heilbron ==
- Thandani Ntshumayelo, South African football player.
- Henning Klopper
- Sisi Mabe
- Peter Maltitz Anderson

== See also ==
- Second Boer War
- Anglo-Boer War Museum
