= Petrus Steyn =

- Mamafubedu
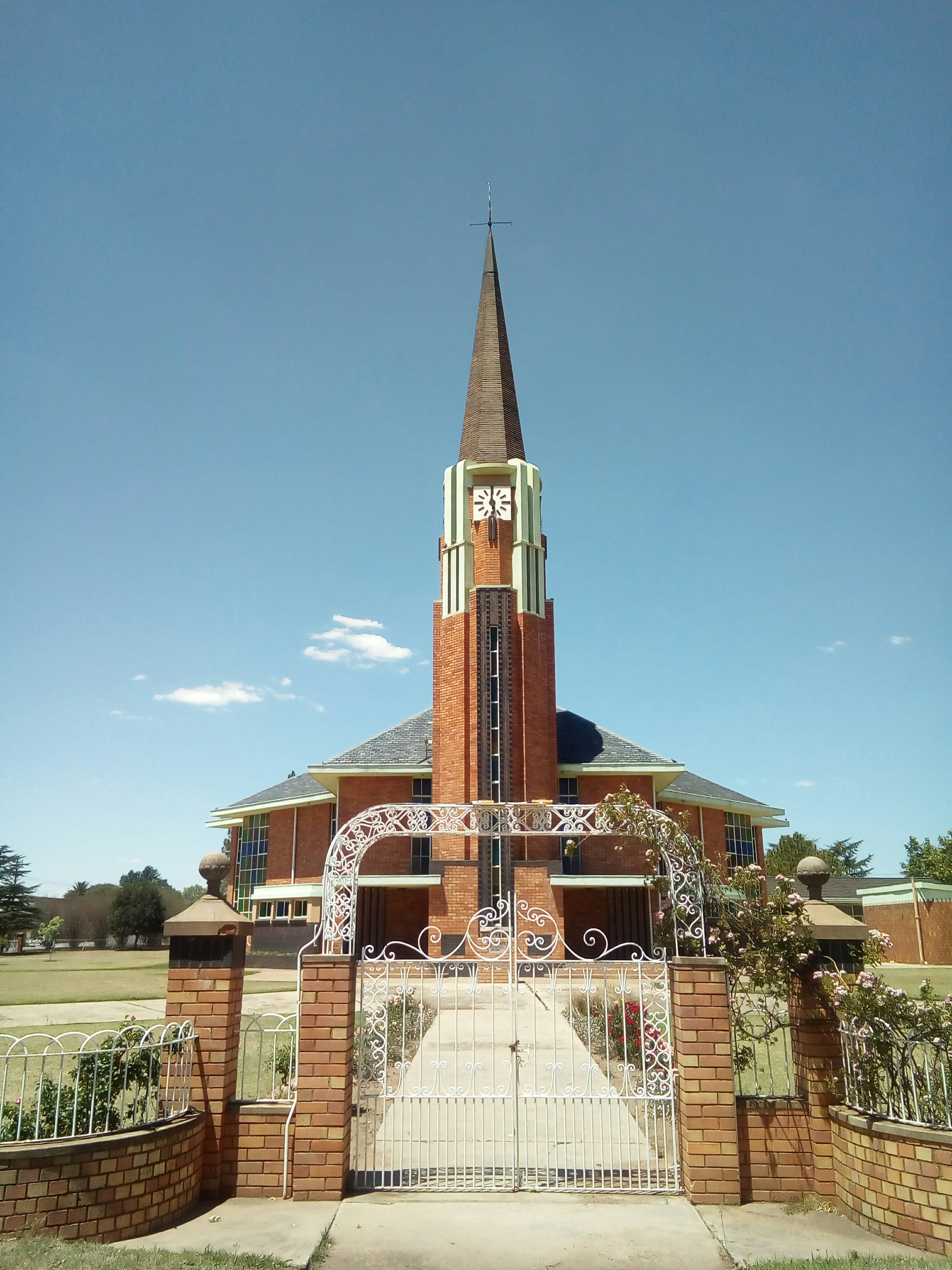
- Petrus Steyn Church

- Location within Free State (South African province) Location within South Africa
- Coordinates: 27°39′00″S 28°08′00″E
- Country: South Africa
- Province: Free State
- District: Thabo Mofutsanyane
- Municipality: Nketoana

Area
  - Total: 11.0 km^{2} (4.2 sq mi)
- Elevation: 1,700 m (5,600 ft)

Population (2011)
  - Total: 12,893
  - Density: 1,170/km^{2} (3,040/sq mi)

Racial makeup (2011)
  - Black: 79.7%
  - White: 19.4%
  - Indian/Asian: 0.5%
  - Coloured: 0.3%
  - Other: 0.1%

First languages (2011)
  - Sotho: 74.7%
  - Zulu: 5.2%
  - Afrikaans: 19.6%
  - Sign language: 0.2%
  - Other: 0.3%
- Time zone: UTC+2 (SAST)
- Postal code (street): 9640
- PO box: 9640
- Area code: 058

Petrus Steyn, officially Mamafubedu, is a small farming town between Tweeling and Kroonstad, 35 km north-east of Lindley in the Free State province of South Africa. It is at the centre of an agricultural area known for wheat, maize, sunflower, potato, cattle, hunting, and sheep production. It forms part of the breadbasket in the Free State. It is the highest town above sea level in the Free State. Farming industries in Petrus Steyn provide potatoes worldwide. Petrus Steyn is located within the grassland biomes which is the second largest biome in the country, covering 29% of the land area. The town is underlain by both the Adelaide and Tarkastad geological formations.

In the 2011 census, the town of Petrus Steyn proper had a population of 596, with 73.3% of residents identifying as White, 20.5% as Black African, 4.7% as Indian/Asian, and 1.5% as Coloured. Afrikaans was the most common first language in the town, spoken by 77.6% of the population, followed by English at 9.2% and Sotho at 7.1%. The Basotho township Mamafubedu, bordering Petrus Steyn to the south, recorded a population of 12,297, bringing the total population of the Petrus Steyn area to 12,893.

In 2012, the South African Geographical Names Council (SAGNC) decided to rename the town of Petrus Steyn to Mamafubedu.

== History of the town ==
Petrus Steyn was born on 23 June 1842 in Robertson, Western Cape province of South Africa, and died on 7 November 1897. The town was supposed to be called Concordia, but the widow of the late Mr Petrus Paulus Steyn sold it on condition that the new town be named after her husband. The farm Sterkfontein was then sold out of the will of Mr Steyn for the price of 4 pounds & 5 shillings per acre, which was bought on 11 October 1912, the official date that Petrus Steyn the town was established.

The Renoster River has its origin on erf 502, just next to the Petrus Steyn family graveyard. The area is now being developed into a heritage and community park.

In 2019, residents of Mamafubedu torched the house of Mamikie Mokoena, the Nketoana Local Municipality mayor, as they had been struggling with water and service delivery.

== Gallery ==
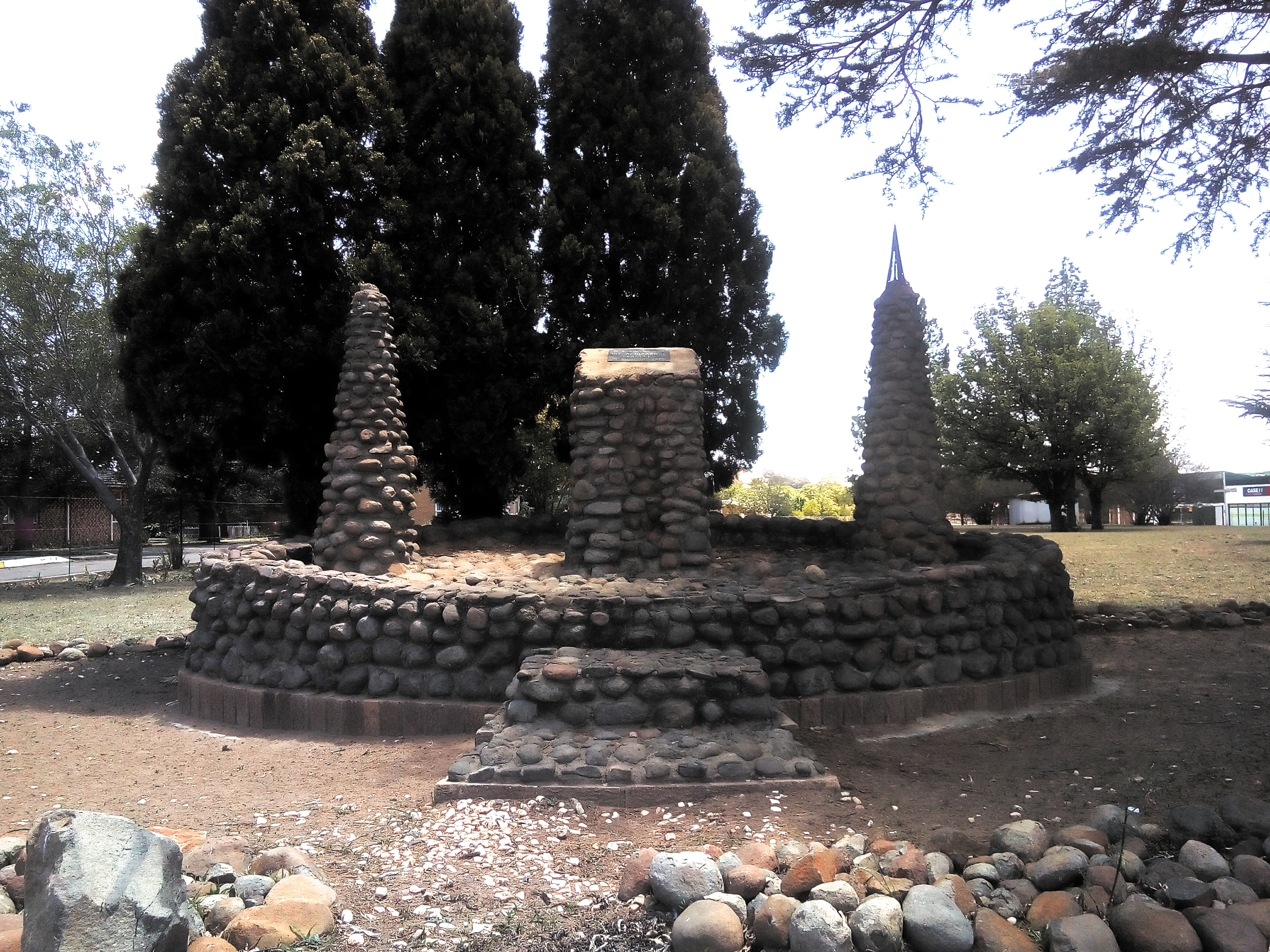
14 August 1975 Afrikaans language monument

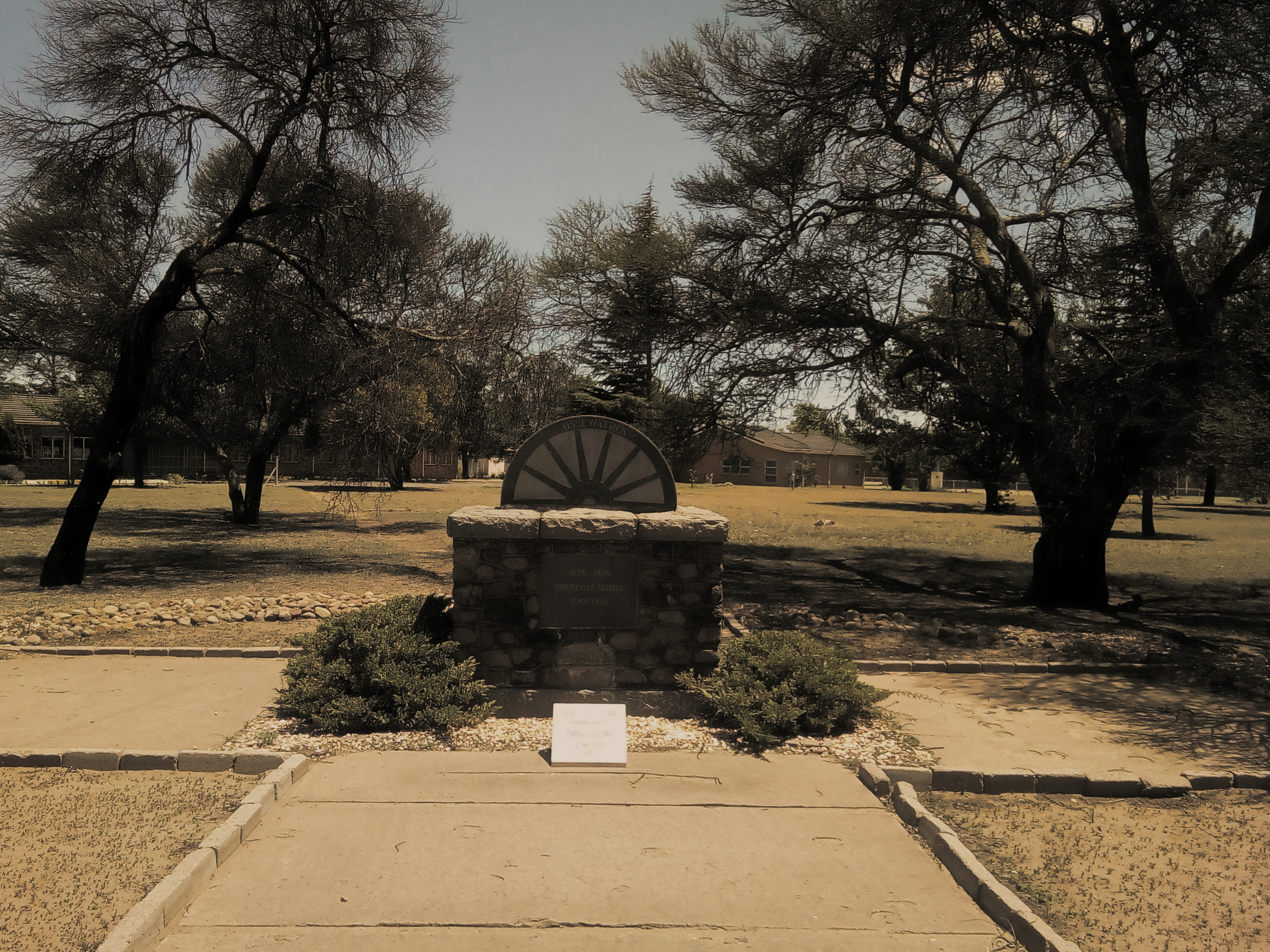
The Wagon Wheel Monument, including tracks of Voortrekker leader Sarel Cilliers

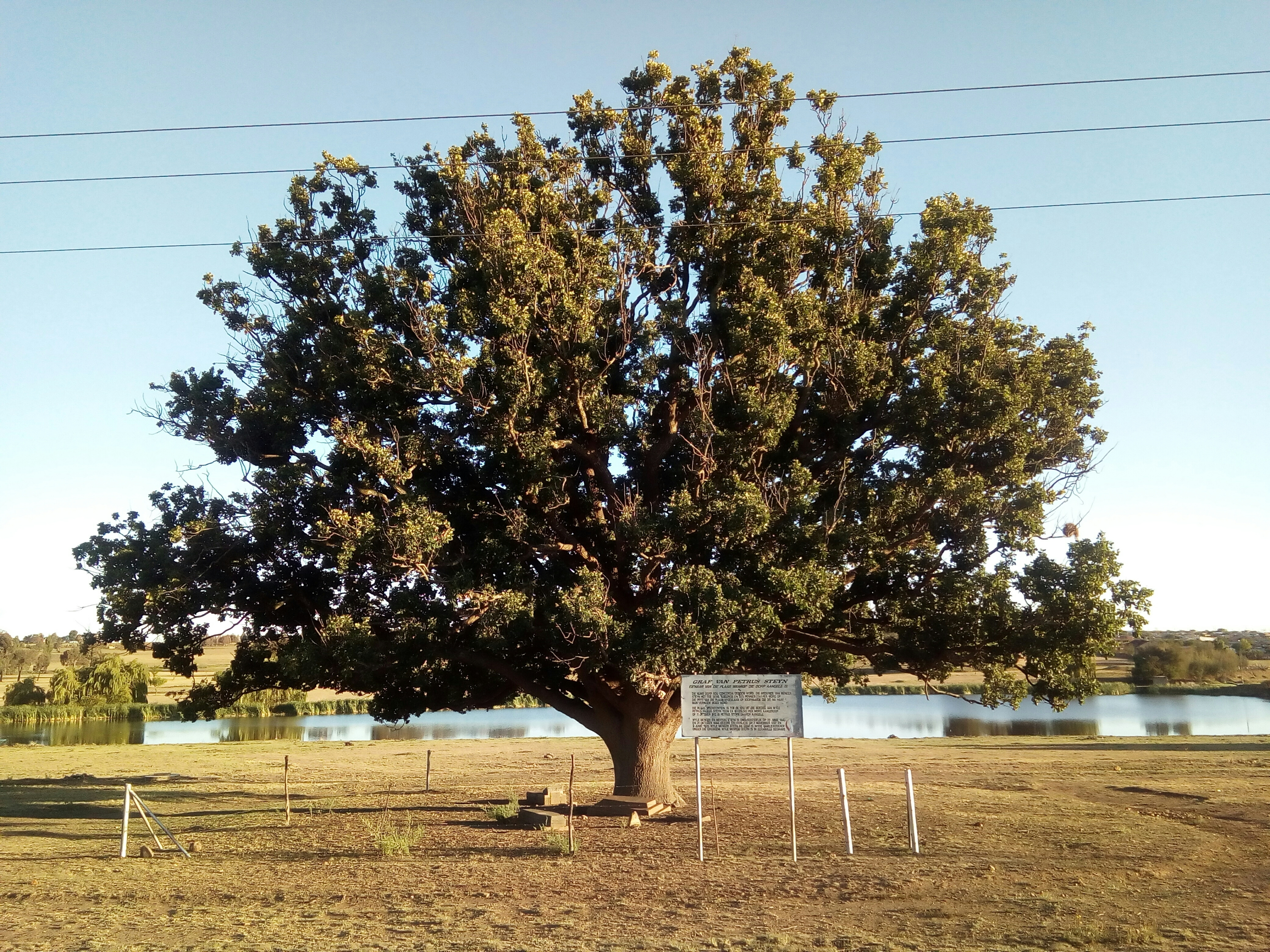
The resting place of the Farmer Petrus Steyn, whom the town Petrus Steyn is named after

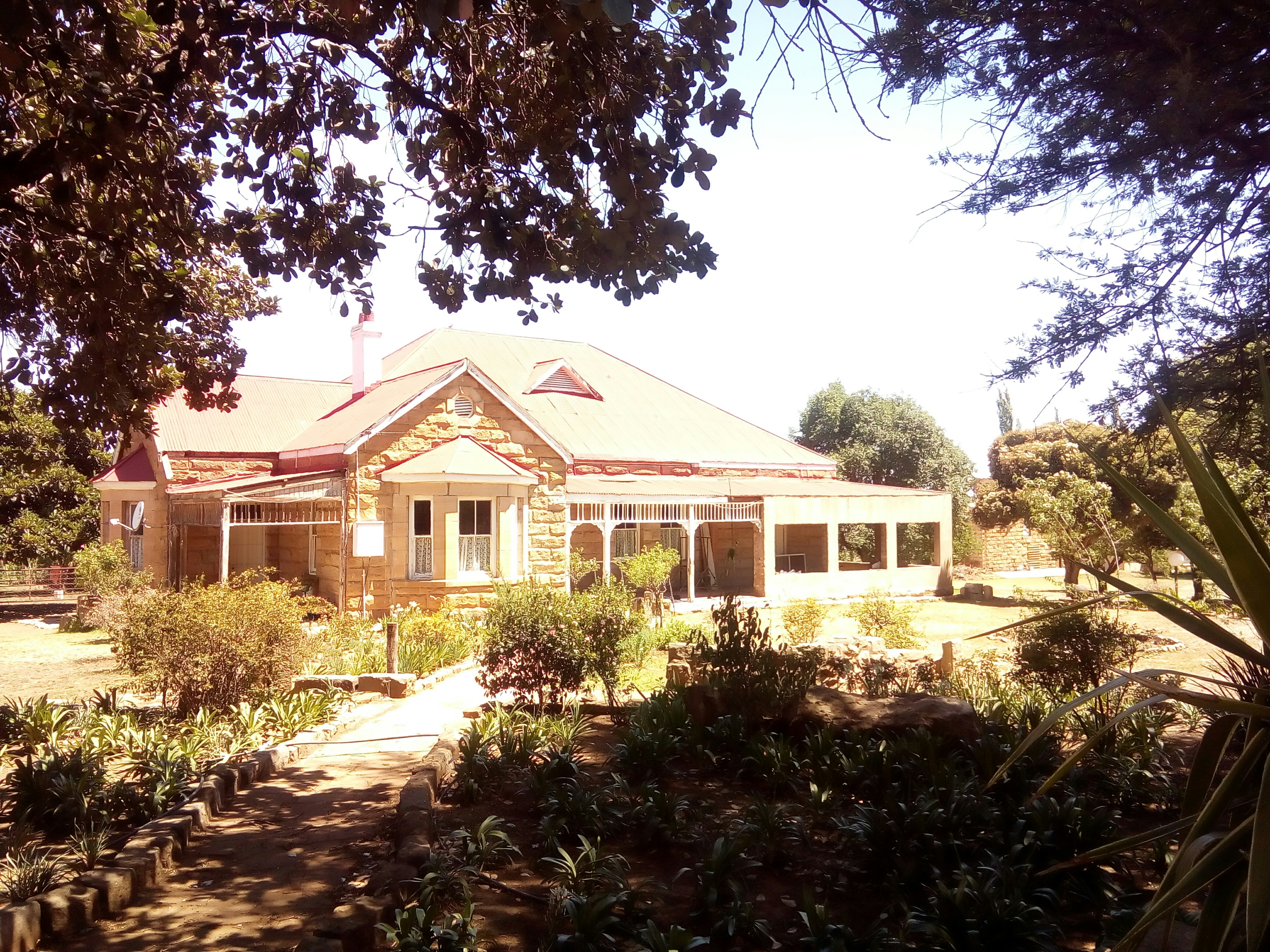
The old sandstone parsonage of the Dutch Reformed Church

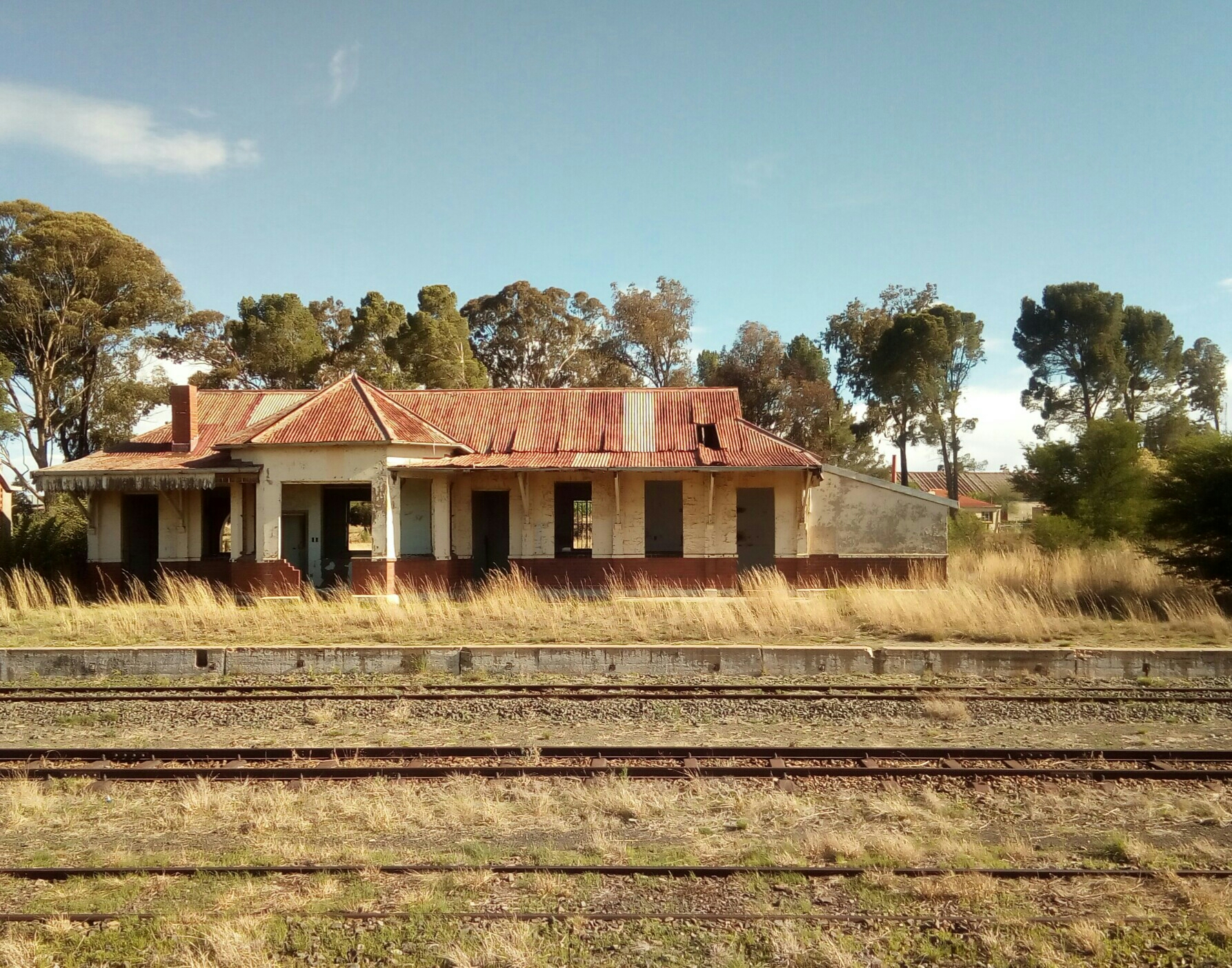
Ruins of Petrus Steyn Train Station

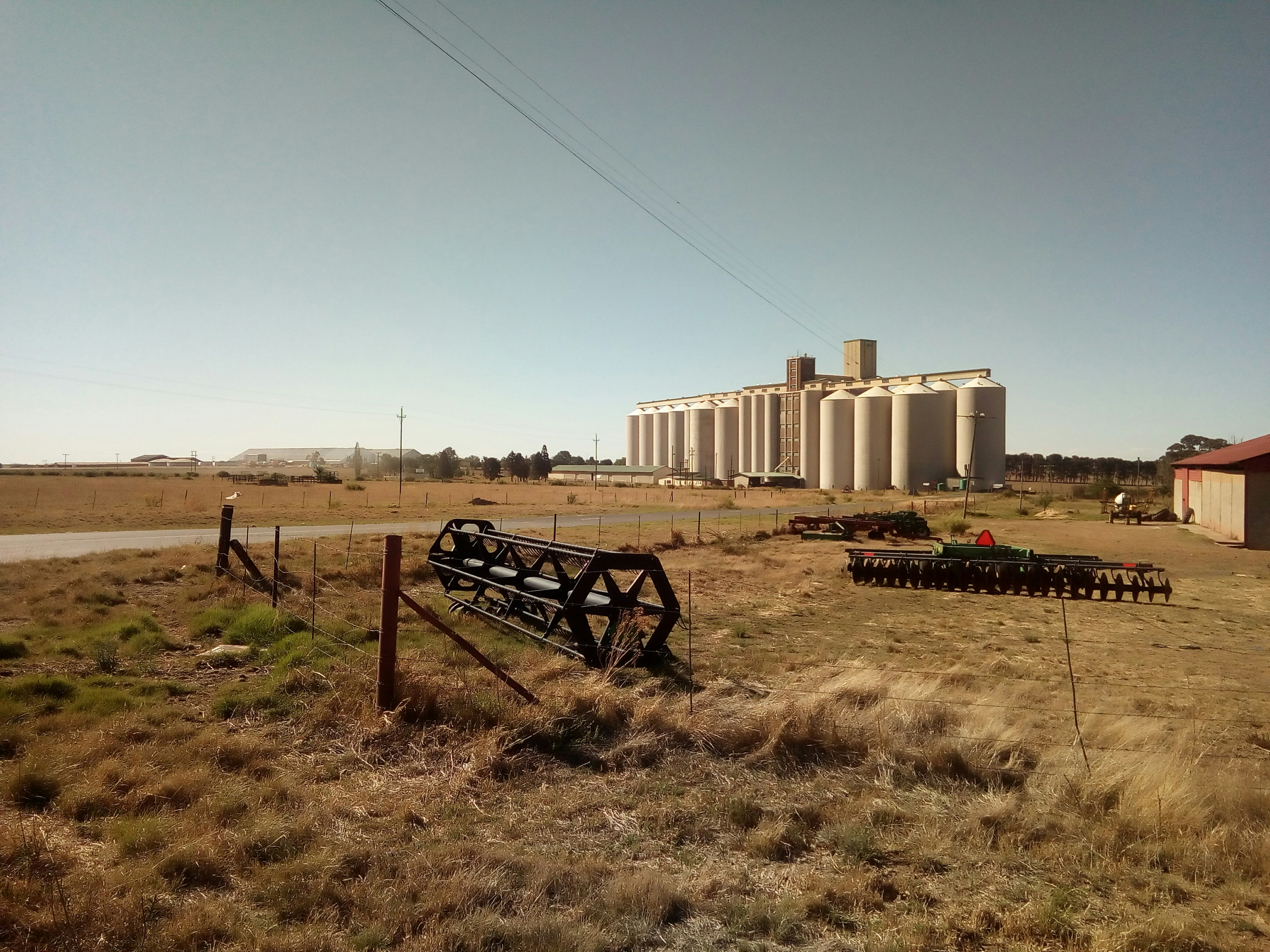
Petrus Steyn grain silos

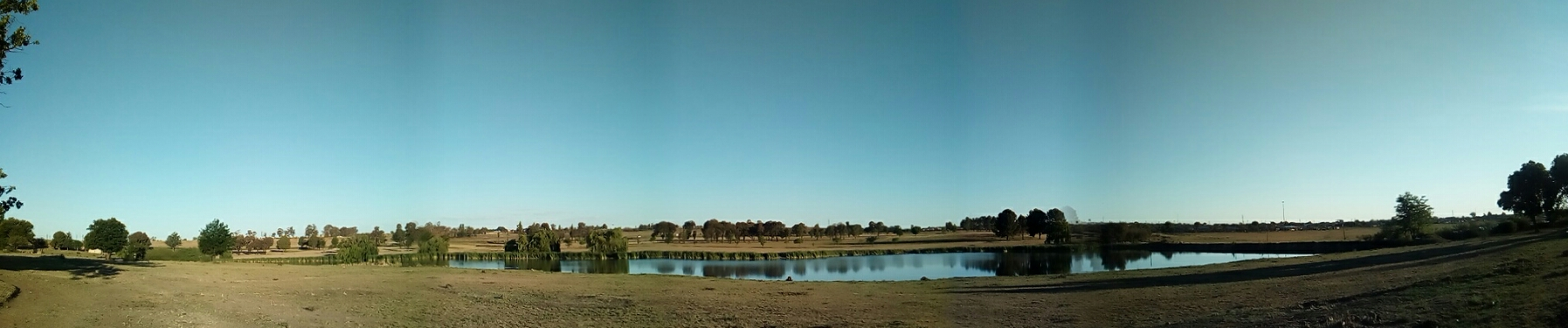
Panorama of Renoster dam

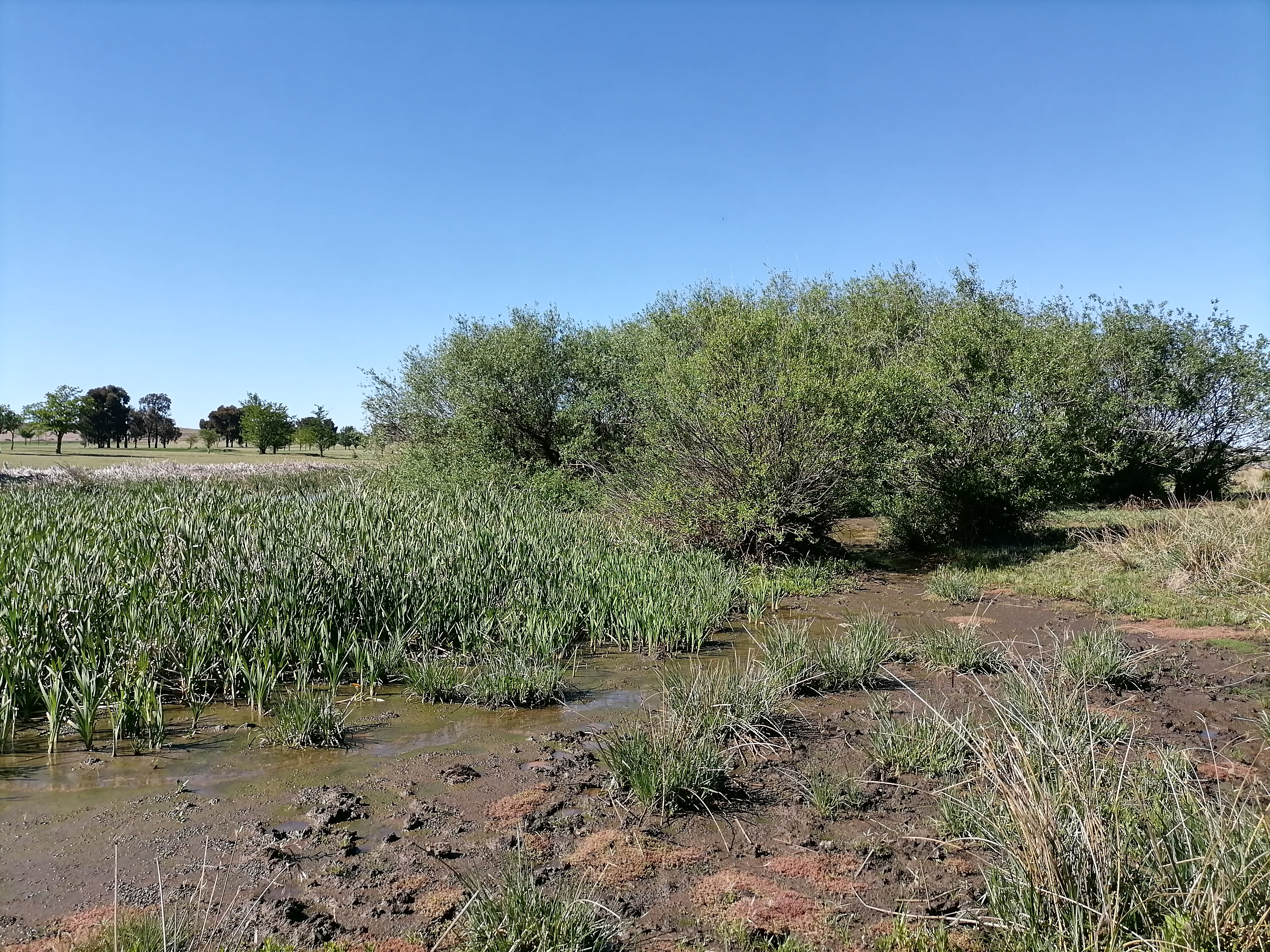
Near the eye of Rhinosterrivier at Rhino Heritage Park, Petrus Steyn

Peace Treaty of Vereeniging, 31 May 1902. Pdf file of four pages.

== Monuments ==
=== Afrikaanse Taalmonument ===
An Afrikaans language monument was created out of stones stacked by visitors on 14 August 1975, in celebration of the centenary of the Afrikaans Language.

=== Ox Wagon Wheel Monument ===
The Ox Wagon Wheel Monument was erected in 1938, during the centenary celebrations of the Great Trek. Here, an ox wagon belonging to Sarel Cilliers left its tracks. These, as well as footprints by participants, are preserved on a concrete slab. These two monuments are found at the town civic centre at Dirkie Uys square, named after Dirkie Uys, the son of Piet Uys who led a punitive expedition against the Zulus after they killed Piet Retief and his 70 men at Dingane's kraal (settlement).

=== Hooggelegen monuments ===
On the R707 towards Frankfort, at a farm called Hooggelegen, three monuments of historical significance are found. These commemorate the 1938 centenary of the Great Trek and the rebels who died during the Maritz rebellion of 1914.

=== Dutch Reformed Church sandstone parsonage ===
The sandstone parsonage of the local Dutch Reformed Church was the place where a portion of the 1933 Bible translation from Dutch to Afrikaans was completed by Reverend Steyn who was responsible for the books of Acts and Johannes and lived in the parsonage from 1930 to 1933. The parsonage was declared a national monument in 1988 and is situated on Du Plessis street.

== Heritage Sites ==
=== Petrus Steyn graveyard ===
The family graveyard of Petrus Steyn was laid out in 1898 under the oak tree and the area is now part of the Rhino Heritage Park. This is the oldest known tree in town.

=== General Cornelis H. Olivier ===
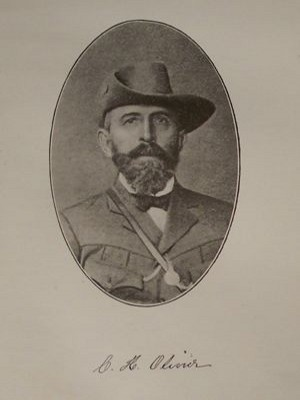
General C.H. Olivier

General Cornelis Hermanus Olivier was one of the delegates sent to sign the Peace Treaty of Vereeniging to end the Second Anglo Boer War on 31 May 1902.

He was a Boer general and lived in the Lindley district, where he had a farm. He lies buried at the old Petrus Steyn cemetery.

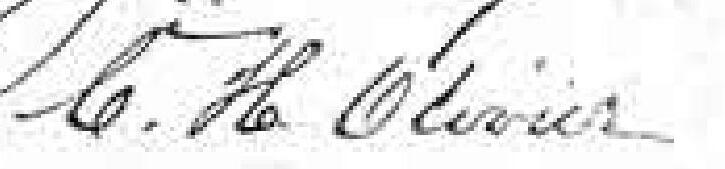
Peace Treaty of Vereeniging, South Africa, 31 May 1902 (page 4 crop) - C. H. Olivier's signature

=== Elandskop Hill ===
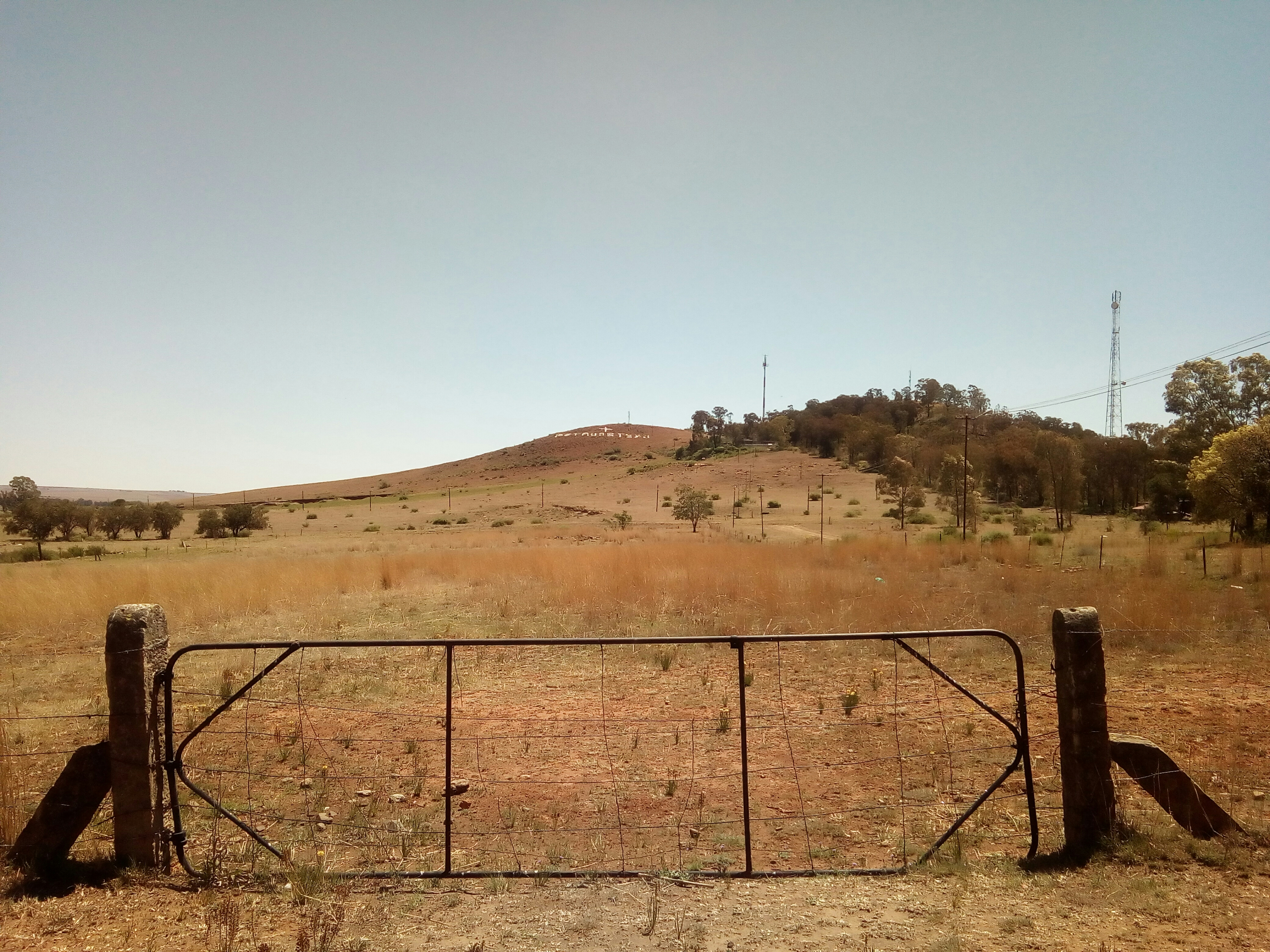
Elandskop Hill

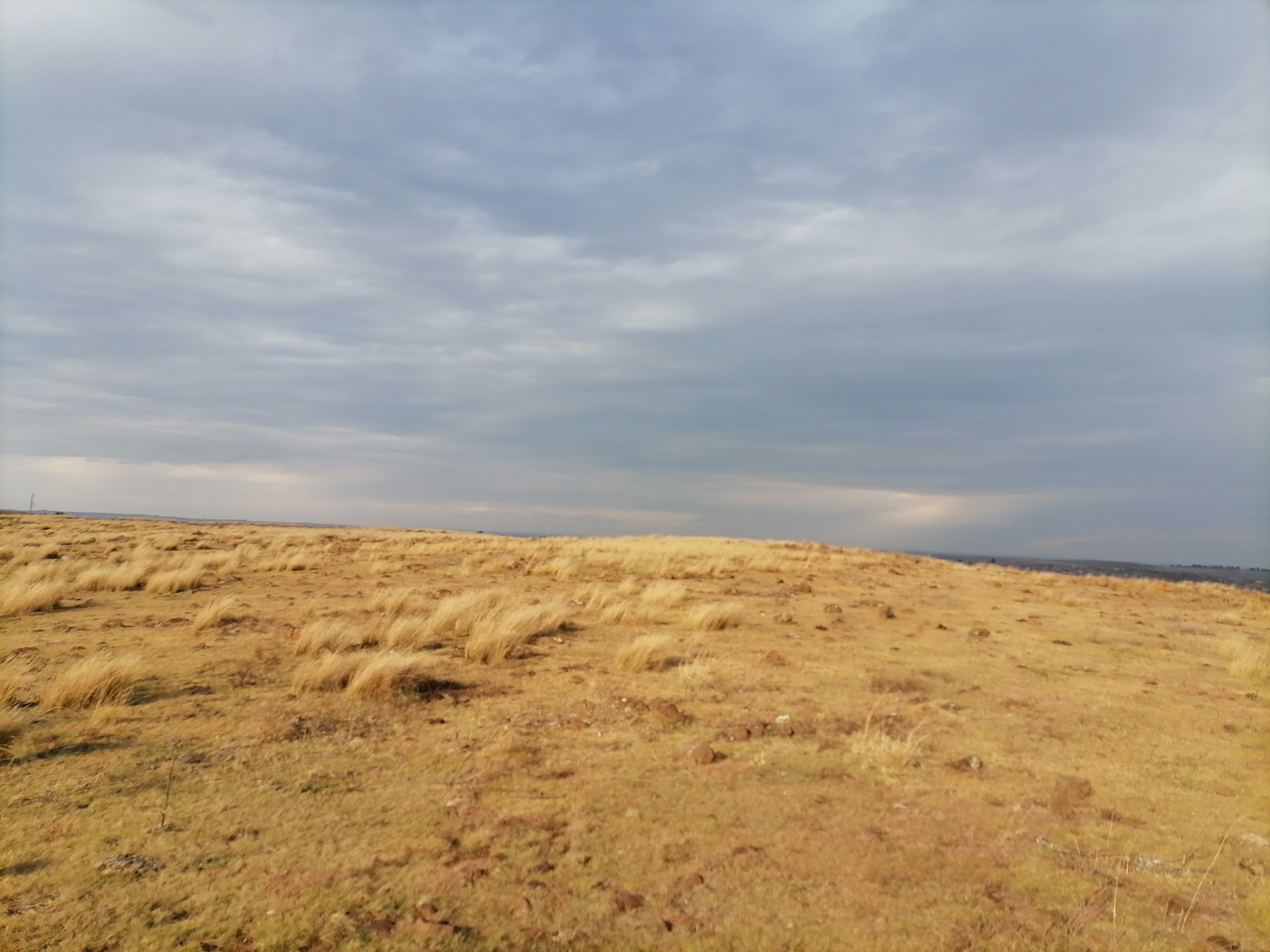
Grassland and biome on top of Elandskop Hill

Elandskop Hill is located north of the town, and during the Second Anglo-Boer War (1899–1902) was an excellent observation post for the Boer and British. For the Boer forces it was a particularly important heliograph station, because the headquarters of General Christiaan de Wet and also the Orange Free State Government were located there for a long time near the present-day town. The hill is 1,637 m above sea level in the Free State.

The hill is home to the endangered threatened species that is endemic to Highveld grasslands in the interior of South Africa, the sungazer (Smaug giganteus, syn. Cordylus giganteus), also known as the giant girdled lizard, giant dragon lizard, or ouvolk in Afrikaans language.

=== Petrus Steyn train station ===
The train station was first opened in 1925, through a rail link to Heilbron. In the 1930s, the line was extended further to Lindley and to a connection with the main line at Arlington. The 100 year-old building has been declared a heritage site and will soon become home to Elandskop Museum.

== Farming ==
Petrus Steyn is also one of the biggest producers of potatoes, which are supplied to Lays and Simba.

=== The origin of the Renoster river ===
The Renoster River is a tributary of the Vaal River in South Africa. It originates in Petrus Steyn in the Free State. From its origin, the river flows north west, passing Heilbron into the Koppies Dam. From there, it flows beyond Koppies as it flows under the N1 national road. Near Viljoenskroon it flows northwest, flows under the R59 and R501 and joins the Vaal River at Renovaal, about 25 km east of Orkney.

== Notable people ==
- Ennock Mlangeni, visual artist
- Twin Mosia, museum curator

== See also ==
- Treaty of Vereeniging
- Second Boer War
