= Oviston Nature Reserve =

Protected area in the Eastern Cape Province, South Africa

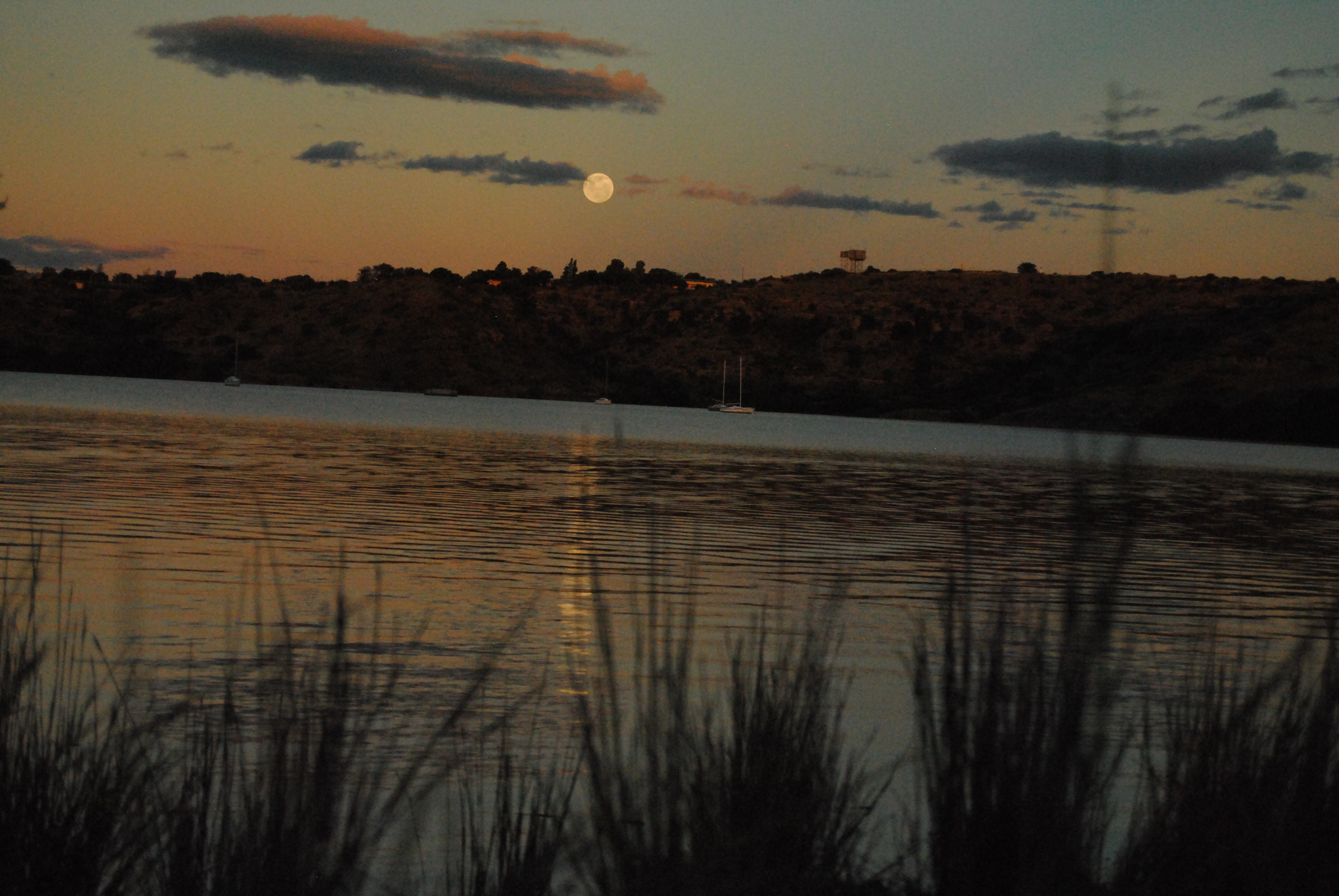
- Sunset at Oviston Nature Reserve by the Gariep Dam

- Location within Eastern Cape
- Location: S of Gariep Dam
- Nearest city: Venterstad
- Coordinates: 30°45′S 25°42′E
- Area: 16,000 ha (40,000 acres)
- Governing body: Eastern Cape Parks

Oviston Nature Reserve is a protected area in the Eastern Cape Province, South Africa. The nature reserve is managed by Eastern Cape Parks. It is located on the southern shores of the Gariep Dam.

== Overview ==
The Oviston Nature Reserve offers a 16 000 ha of unspoilt wildlife area which hosts aardvark, aardwolf, Southern African wildcat, bat-eared fox, black wildebeest, black-backed jackal, blesbuck, brown hyena, Burchell's zebra, Cape clawless otter, Cape fox, Cape ground squirrel, Cape hare, Cape porcupine, caracal, chacma baboon, duiker, eland, kudu, mountain reedbuck, gemsbuck, red hartebeest, rock dassie (rock hyrax), scrub hare, small-spotted cat, small spotted genet, Smith's red rock hare, southern African hedgehog, spotted-necked otter, springbuck, steenbuck, suricate, vervet monkey, water mongoose and yellow mongoose.

The Orange River offers the ideal setting for sunset cruises. The area surrounding the lake gives mountain bike enthusiasts open stretches with rides into the Oviston Nature Reserve. This is a bird lovers' paradise, with a wide variety found on the farm. Rarities include African fish eagle, black eagle, blue crane, secretary bird, steppe buzzard, kingfishers and many more.

The Orange River has become a fly-fishing mecca due to the abundance of both Yellowfish species. Some of the species found are largemouth yellowfish, smallmouth yellowfish, Orange River mudfish, moggel, sharptooth catfish, chubbthead barb, carp and many more.

== Location ==
Oviston Nature Reserve is in the northeastern part of the Eastern Cape Province along the southern shoreline of the mighty Gariep Dam (formerly known as the Hendrik Verwoerd Dam). It covers an area of approximately 16,000 hectare and stretches from the dam wall on the west, to the Bethulie railroad bridge in the east. Oviston and Venterstad are 7 km from the reserve entrance.

=== Lake Gariep ===
Lake Gariep, which spans the borders of the Free State, Eastern Cape and Northern Cape Provinces, lies approximately two hours south of Bloemfontein. The dam is more than 100 km long and 15 km wide with a surface area of about 360 km² and a storage capacity of 5,673,8 million cubic meters. The dam wall is 914 m long and 88 m high.

=== Oviston ===
Oviston is a small town overlooking Lake Gariep on the Eastern Cape side. It was originally built to house the workers who built the Orange-Fish River Tunnel that carries water to the Fish River catchment from the Orange River upstream of the Gariep Dam that was built to form a storage reservoir, and completed in 1971}.

=== Nearby reserves ===
Lake Gariep is surrounded by three provincial nature reserves: the Oviston Nature Reserve, the Tussen-die-Riviere Nature Reserve and the Gariep Nature Reserve. The Gariep Nature Reserve is between the dam and Bethulie on the Free State side. The Tussen-die-Riviere Nature Reserve is in the Free State. Oviston Nature Reserve is in the Eastern Cape Province on the southern shores of Lake Gariep.

== History ==
The land was originally bought by the state for the construction of the dam. In 1968, the Department of Agricultural Credit and Land Tenure and Water Affairs ceded control of the property to the provincial authorities. A memorandum has been drafted by the MECs of the three provinces to effectively join the three reserves and create a conservation area in excess of 85,000 hectares.

== Climate ==
This is a semi-desert area; it can get blindingly hot during the day, followed by nights in which the temperature plummets. Due to this climate, the area is quite dusty which helps to give extraordinary sunsets. The landscape consists of vast, open grassland with low koppies (small mountains) and is part of South Africa's "Big Sky" country.

Rain generally falls as thundershowers between October and March, the rainfall season peaks from February to March. Temperatures are mild for most of the year, with very cold snaps from June to August and periods of intense heat from January to March. During winter, frost is common.

== See also ==
- South African National Parks – Body responsible for managing South Africa's national parks
- List of protected areas of South Africa
- Orange–Fish River Tunnel – Irrigation tunnel in South Africa
