= Venterstad =

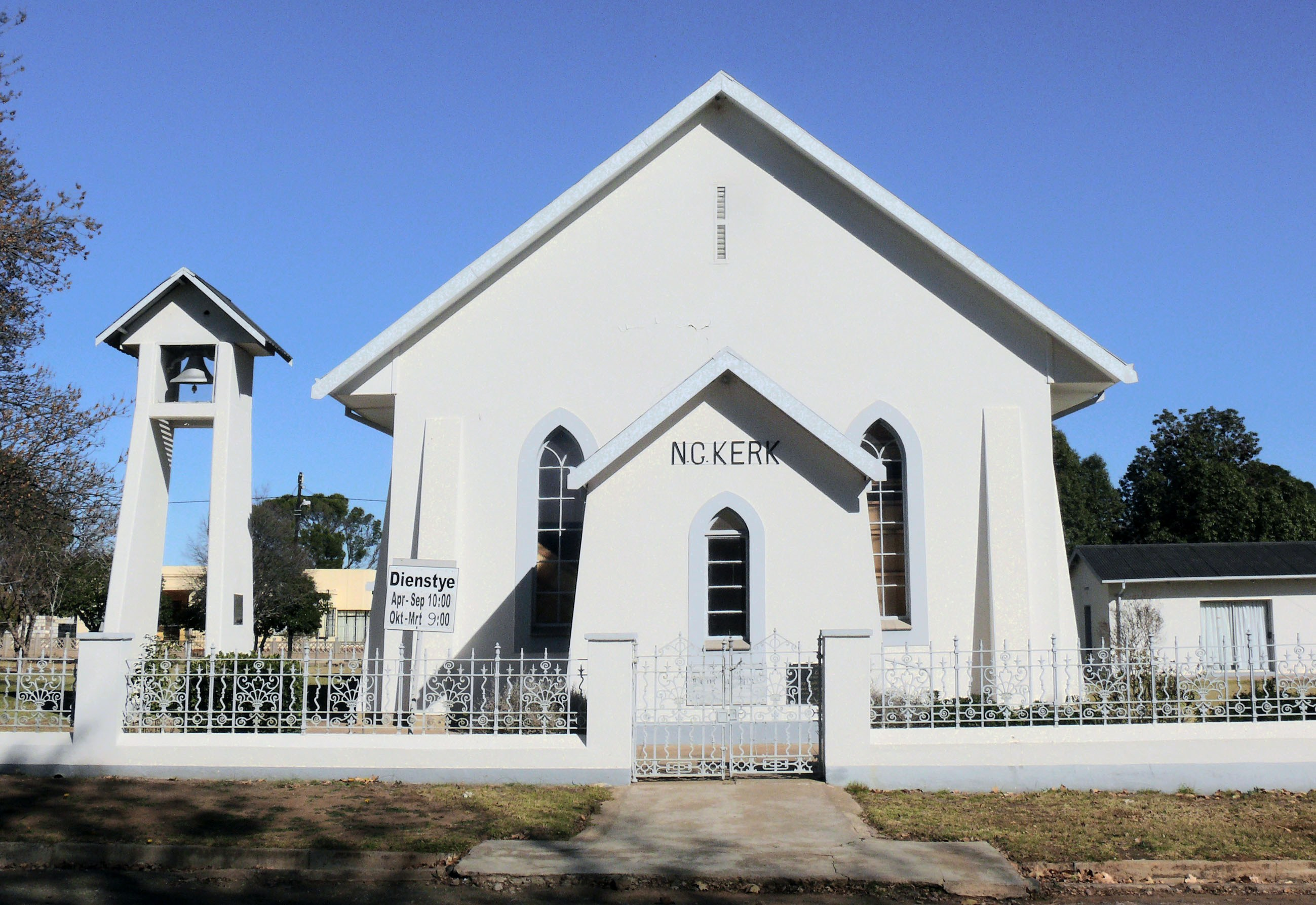
- Dutch Reformed Church in Venterstad

- Location within Eastern Cape Location within South Africa
- Coordinates: 30.776°S 25.8°E
- Country: South Africa
- Province: Eastern Cape
- District: Joe Gqabi
- Municipality: Walter Sisulu
- Established: 1875

Government
  - Type: Local Municipality

Area
  - Total: 17.6 km^{2} (6.8 sq mi)
- Elevation: 1,290 m (4,230 ft)

Population (2011)
  - Total: 3,596
  - Density: 204/km^{2} (529/sq mi)

Racial makeup (2011)
  - Black African: 87.3%
  - Coloured: 10.6%
  - Indian/Asian: 0.3%
  - White: 1.2%
  - Other: 0.6%

First languages (2011)
  - Xhosa: 82.2%
  - Afrikaans: 11.4%
  - Sotho: 2.7%
  - Other: 3.7%
- Time zone: UTC+2 (SAST)
- Postal code (street): 9798
- PO box: 9798
- Area code: 051-654-

Venterstad is a settlement in Walter Sisulu Local Municipality in Joe Gqabi District Municipality in the Eastern Cape province of South Africa.

Town 43 km south-east of Norvalspont and 65 km west of Burgersdorp It was laid out in 1875 and attained municipal status in 1895. Named after the owner of the land on which it was established, Johannes J. T. Venter.

It is one of the smaller towns that currently forms part of the Gariep Local Municipality, with its seat in Burgersdorp. The town and its surrounding areas are served by a 24-hour Primary healthcare clinic (Venterstad Clinic), previously municipality-owned, but since 2010 run by the sub-district office for Health of the Eastern Cape Province. It also supports a mobile clinic and a satellite clinic at Oviston.

== See also ==
- Gariep Dam
- Oviston
- Oviston Nature Reserve
- Orange-Fish River Tunnel
