= Gariep Local Municipality =

Gariep
- Former local municipality
- Seal

- Location in the Eastern Cape
- Coordinates: 30°59′S 26°19′E
- Country: South Africa
- Province: Eastern Cape
- District: Joe Gqabi
- Seat: Burgersdorp
- Wards: 5

Government
  - Type: Municipal council
  - Past Mayor: Ncedo Ngoqo

Area
  - Total: 8,911 km^{2} (3,441 sq mi)

Population (2011)
  - Total: 33,677
  - Density: 3.779/km^{2} (9.788/sq mi)

Racial makeup (2011)
  - Black African: 72.9%
  - Coloured: 17.8%
  - Indian/Asian: 0.3%
  - White: 8.7%

First languages (2011)
  - Xhosa: 67.3%
  - Afrikaans: 26.2%
  - Sotho: 2.3%
  - English: 1.9%
  - Other: 2.3%
- Time zone: UTC+2 (SAST)
- Municipal code: EC144

Gariep Local Municipality is a defunct local municipality in Joe Gqabi District Municipality, Eastern Cape. The municipality was merged with Maletswai Local Municipality immediately after the August 2016 Local Municipal Elections to form the new Walter Sisulu Local Municipality.

== Main places ==
The 2011 census divided the municipality into the following main places:

Place	Code	Area (km^{2})	Population
Burgersdorp	289005	27.92	5,241
Khayamnandi	289008	2.67	4,724
Mzamomhle	289006	1.27	4,656
Nozizwe	289003	0.47	1,393
Oviston	289001	358.88	658
Steynsburg	289009	14.70	2,488
Tembisa	289007	1.74	6,094
Venterstad	289002	17.59	3,596
Remainder of the municipality	289004	8,485.82	4,826

== Politics ==
The municipal council consisted of ten members elected by mixed-member proportional representation. Five councillors were elected by first-past-the-post voting in five wards, while the remaining five were chosen from party lists so that the total number of party representatives was proportional to the number of votes received. In the election of 18 May 2011 the African National Congress (ANC) won a majority of seven seats on the council. The following table shows the results of the election.

Party	Votes				Seats		
Party	Ward	List	Total	%	Ward	List	Total
ANC	6,394	6,542	12,936	69.2	4	3	7
DA	2,500	2,612	5,112	27.3	1	2	3
PAC	190	157	347	1.9	0	0	0
Independent	214	–	214	1.1	0	–	0
UDM	45	43	88	0.5	0	0	0
Total	9,343	9,354	18,697	100.0	5	5	10
Spoilt votes	147	137	284				
