= Zelotes invidus =

Bergvliet Dark Ground Spider

Conservation status
- Least Concern (SANBI Red List)

Scientific classification
- Kingdom: Animalia
- Phylum: Arthropoda
- Subphylum: Chelicerata
- Class: Arachnida
- Order: Araneae
- Infraorder: Araneomorphae
- Family: Gnaphosidae
- Genus: Zelotes
- Species: Z. invidus

Binomial name
- Zelotes invidus (Purcell, 1907)

Synonyms
- Melanophora invida Purcell, 1907; Zelotes aculeatus Tucker, 1923

Species of spider

Zelotes invidus is a species of spider in the family Gnaphosidae. It is found in southern Africa and is commonly known as the Bergvliet dark ground spider.

== Distribution ==
Zelotes invidus occurs in Namibia and South Africa. In South Africa, it is known from three provinces, Eastern Cape, Free State, and Western Cape. The species occurs at altitudes ranging from 6 to 1,629 m above sea level.

Collection localities include Alicedale, Grahamstown, Mountain Zebra National Park, Port Elizabeth, Kei Mouth, Bethlehem, Tussen-die-Riviere Nature Reserve, Bergvliet, Cape Peninsula, Cape Town, Caledon, Camps Bay, Cederberg Wilderness Area, Ceres, Dassen Island, Hout Bay, Karoo National Park, Matjiesfontein, Montagu, Paternoster, Plettenberg Bay, Stellenbosch, and Table Mountain National Park.

== Habitat and ecology ==
Zelotes invidus are free-running ground spiders found under stones during the day. The species has been sampled from the Fynbos, Grassland, Indian Ocean Coastal Belt, Nama Karoo, and Thicket biomes.

== Conservation ==
Zelotes invidus is listed as Least Concern by the South African National Biodiversity Institute due to its wide geographic range. There are no significant threats to the species, and it is protected in Mountain Zebra National Park, Tussen-die-Riviere Nature Reserve, Cederberg Wilderness Area, Karoo National Park, and Table Mountain National Park.

== Taxonomy ==
The species was originally described by William Frederick Purcell in 1907 from Bergvliet in the Western Cape as Melanophora invida. FitzPatrick's 2007 revision synonymized Zelotes aculeatus Tucker, 1923 with Z. invidus. The species is known only from the female.
