= Walter Sisulu Local Municipality elections =

The Walter Sisulu Local Municipality council was formed in 2016, and consists of twenty-two members elected by mixed-member proportional representation. Eleven councillors are elected by first-past-the-post voting in eleven wards, while the remaining eleven are chosen from party lists so that the total number of party representatives is proportional to the number of votes received.

In the election of 1 November 2021, the African National Congress (ANC) won a reduced majority of twelve seats.

== Results ==
The following table shows the composition of the council after past elections.

Event	ANC	DA	EFF	MCA	Total
2016 election	15	5	1	1	22
2021 election	12	5	3	2	22

== August 2016 election ==
The following table shows the results of the 2016 election.

Party	Ward			List			Total seats
Party	Votes	%	Seats	Votes	%	Seats	Total seats
African National Congress	13,686	66.85	10	13,805	66.89	5	15
Democratic Alliance	4,638	22.65	1	4,630	22.43	4	5
Economic Freedom Fighters	1,158	5.66	0	1,173	5.68	1	1
Maletswai Civic Association	878	4.29	0	1,030	4.99	1	1
United Residents Front	62	0.30	0				0
Independent candidates	51	0.25	0				0
Total	20,473	100.00	11	20,638	100.00	11	22
Valid votes	20,473	98.13		20,638	98.29		
Invalid/blank votes	391	1.87		359	1.71		
Total votes	20,864	100.00		20,997	100.00		
Registered voters/turnout	36,607	56.99		36,607	57.36		

== By-elections from August 2016 to November 2021 ==
In a by-election held on 8 August 2018, a ward previously held by an ANC councillor was won by the DA candidate. Council composition was reconfigured as seen below:

Party	Ward	PR list	Total
African National Congress	9	5	14
DA	2	4	6
Economic Freedom Fighters	0	1	1
Maletswai Civic Association	0	1	1
Total	11	11	22

== November 2021 election ==
The following table shows the results of the 2021 election.

Party	Ward			List			Total seats
Party	Votes	%	Seats	Votes	%	Seats	Total seats
African National Congress	9,325	55.41	9	9,367	55.71	3	12
Democratic Alliance	3,871	23.00	2	3,842	22.85	3	5
Economic Freedom Fighters	2,201	13.08	0	2,100	12.49	3	3
Maletswai Civic Association	1,147	6.82	0	1,237	7.36	2	2
African Transformation Movement	284	1.69	0	267	1.59	0	0
Total	16,828	100.00	11	16,813	100.00	11	22
Valid votes	16,828	98.55		16,813	98.55		
Invalid/blank votes	247	1.45		248	1.45		
Total votes	17,075	100.00		17,061	100.00		
Registered voters/turnout	36,110	47.29		36,110	47.25		

=== By-elections from November 2021 ===
The following by-elections were held to fill vacant ward seats in the period since November 2021.

Date	Ward	Party of the previous councillor	Party of the newly elected councillor
22 February 2023	2	Democratic Alliance	Democratic Alliance
24 April 2024	8	African National Congress	African National Congress
