= Maletswai Local Municipality =

Maletswai
- Former local municipality
- Seal

- Location in the Eastern Cape
- Coordinates: 30°41′S 26°42′E
- Country: South Africa
- Province: Eastern Cape
- District: Joe Gqabi
- Seat: Aliwal North
- Wards: 6

Government
  - Type: Municipal council
  - Past Mayor: N.S. Mathetha

Area
  - Total: 4,358 km^{2} (1,683 sq mi)

Population (2011)
  - Total: 43,800
  - Density: 10.1/km^{2} (26.0/sq mi)

Racial makeup (2011)
  - Black African: 85.3%
  - Coloured: 7.4%
  - Indian/Asian: 0.2%
  - White: 6.7%

First languages (2011)
  - Xhosa: 62.3%
  - Sotho: 19.2%
  - Afrikaans: 14.2%
  - English: 2.6%
  - Other: 1.7%
- Time zone: UTC+2 (SAST)
- Municipal code: EC143

Maletswai Local Municipality was an administrative area in the Joe Gqabi District of the Eastern Cape in South Africa. The municipality was merged with Gariep Local Municipality immediately after the August 2016 Local Municipal Elections to form the new Walter Sisulu Local Municipality.

Maletswai is a Sesotho name that means "a place of salt". The thermal springs resort, named Aliwal Spa, is located within the municipal area and produces salty water, rich in minerals, from underground. During 2010-2014 this once beautiful resort was re-constructed and opened to the public again in 2015.

== Main places ==
The 2011 census divided the municipality into the following main places:

Place	Code	Area (km^{2})	Population
Maletswai	288002	7.95	16,001
Dukathole	288001	4.98	19,152
Jamestown	288004	11.98	4,666
Remainder of the municipality	288003	4,306.13	3,981

== Neighbours ==
The neighbours of Maletswai Local Municipality in the Joe Gqabi District Municipality (DC14) are:

- Gariep Local Municipality to the West and
- Senqu Local Municipality to the East.

South of Maletswai lies the Chris Hani District Municipality (DC13) with:

- Lukhanji (Queenstown) and
- Inkwanca (Molteno).

On the Free State side is Mohokare Local Municipality in the Xhariep District Municipality (DC16).

== Politics ==
The municipal council consisted of twelve members elected by mixed-member proportional representation. Six councillors were elected by first-past-the-post voting in six wards, while the remaining six were chosen from party lists so that the total number of party representatives is proportional to the number of votes received. In the election of 18 May 2011 the African National Congress (ANC) won a majority of nine seats on the council. The following table shows the results of the election.

Party	Votes				Seats		
Party	Ward	List	Total	%	Ward	List	Total
ANC	7,972	8,307	16,279	68.2	6	3	9
DA	1,712	1,796	3,508	14.7	0	2	2
United Residents Front	812	1,602	2,414	10.1	0	1	1
Independent	1,033	–	1,033	4.3	0	–	0
UDM	342	286	628	2.6	0	0	0
Total	11,871	11,991	23,862	100.0	6	6	12
Spoilt votes	443	344	787				
