= Glen Melville Reservoir =

Dam in South-Africa

Glen Melville
- Interactive map of Glen Melville
- Country: South Africa
- Location: Grahamstown
- Coordinates: 33°11′6″S 26°39′19″E
- Opening date: 1992; 34 years ago
- Operators: Department of Water Affairs & Forestry

Dam and spillways
- Height (foundation): 32
- Length: 380
- Dam volume: 114

Reservoir
- Total capacity: 7

The Glen Melville Dam is a dam supplied by the Orange-Fish River Tunnel, near Grahamstown, Eastern Cape, South Africa. It was established in 1992 and its main purpose is for domestic and industrial use.

The construction of the dam was motivated by the lack of access to sufficient water in Grahamstown.

== See also ==
- Department of Water Affairs (South Africa)
- List of dams in South Africa
- List of rivers in South Africa
