= Caledon River =

Major river in Lesotho and South Africa

Mohokare
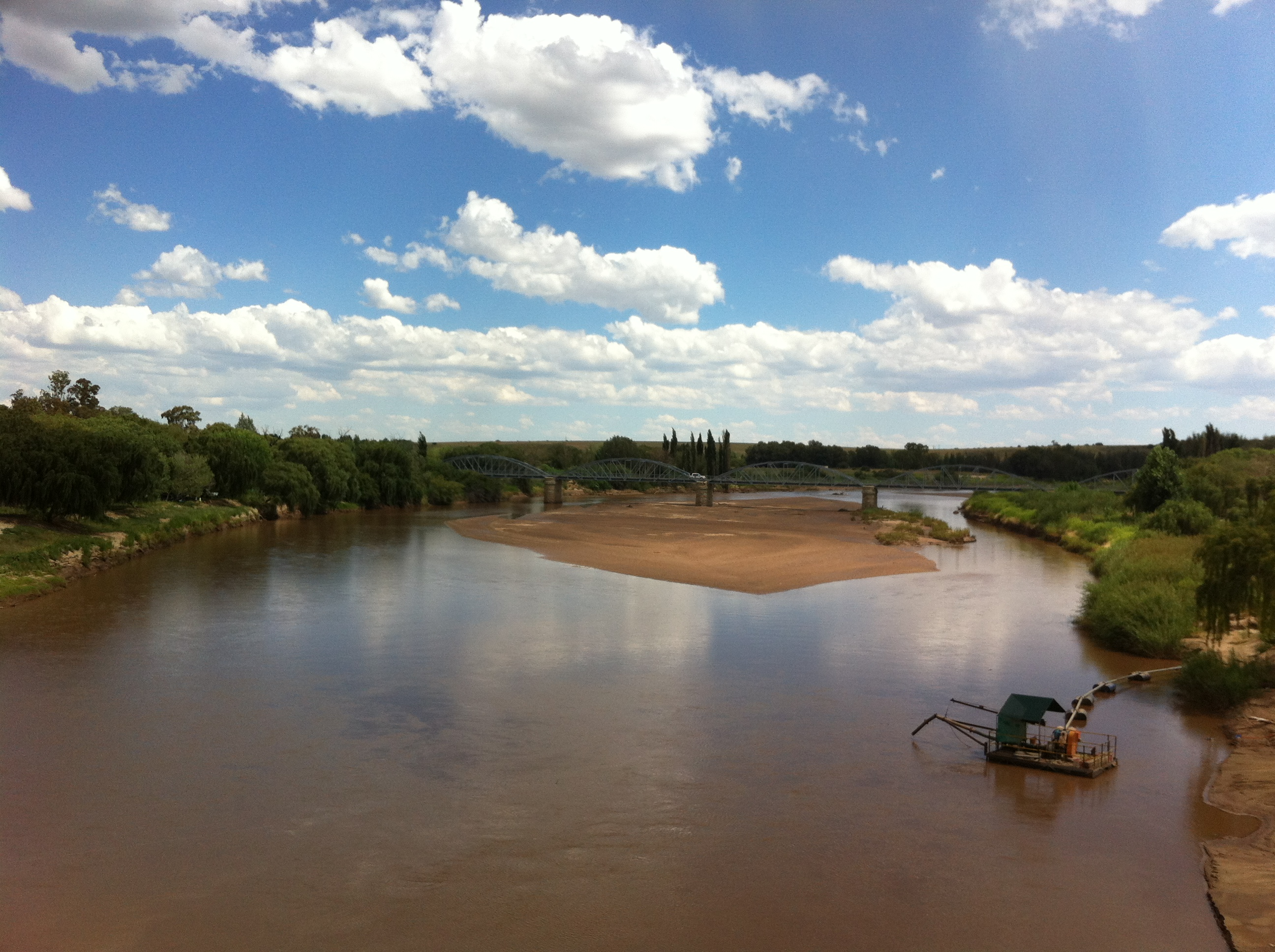

- Location of the Caledon River mouth

Location
- Country: Lesotho, South Africa
- State: Free State
- City: Maputsoe
- City: Maseru

Physical characteristics
- Source: Mont-Aux-Sources
  - location: SW of Phuthaditjhaba, Drakensberg
  - elevation: 2,100 m (6,900 ft)
- Mouth: Orange River
  - location: Near Bethulie
  - coordinates: 30°31′21″S 26°4′21″E
  - elevation: 1,267 m (4,157 ft)
- Length: 642 km (399 mi)

The Caledon River (Sotho: Mohokare) is a major river located in central South Africa. Its total length is 642 km (399 mi), rising in the Drakensberg Mountains on the Lesotho border, flowing southwestward and then westward before joining the Orange River near Bethulie in the southern Free State. The river was originally named Prinses Wilhelminas Rivier in 1777, by Colonel R J Gordon.

== Geography ==
The origin of the River Caledon is in the former bantustan of QwaQwa, near the border with Lesotho, southwest of Witsieshoek. It then flows south-west bordering Lesotho's capital city, Maseru. It forms the border between South Africa and Lesotho before entering South Africa's Free State province (north of Wepener). It then flows westward before joining the Orange River near Bethulie in southern Free State, just before flowing into the Gariep Dam. Its total length is about 480 km (300 mi), and its valley experiences great temperature swings. The land in the wedge between Caledon River and Orange River forms the 22,000-ha Tussen-die-Riviere Nature Reserve.

== River ==
The river is the primary source of water for Maseru, the capital of Lesotho, which stands on the river. During periods of low rainfall, water shortages can ensue. To combat this, several reservoirs have been created with structures such as the Muela Dam and the Meulspruit Dam. In 2003, water was released from here to avert drought.

The Caledon Valley is important in the history of the Basotho people. The area was exceptionally fertile and could be farmed without irrigation. This made it desirable and was one of the causes of the conflict between the Basotho and the Boers. Maize is grown on a large scale in the Caledon Valley.

== See also ==
- Basutoland
