= Gariep Nature Reserve =

Nature reserve in South Africa

Coordinates: 30.59299°S 25.53434°E

Gariep Nature Reserve, also known as Gariep Dam Nature Reserve, and formerly known as Hendrik Verwoerd Dam Nature Reserve. It covers the entire northern shore of the Gariep Dam Area. The dam itself is situated in a gorge at the entrance to the Ruigte Valley, nearest town to the reserve is Norvalspont (about 5km away) behind the dam wall. The lake covers an area of 36.487 ha.
