= Oviston =

- Location within Eastern Cape Location within South Africa
- Coordinates: 30.683°S 25.766°E
- Country: South Africa
- Province: Eastern Cape
- District: Joe Gqabi
- Municipality: Walter Sisulu

Area
  - Total: 4.15 km^{2} (1.60 sq mi)
- Elevation: 1,300 m (4,300 ft)

Population (2011)
  - Total: 636
  - Density: 153/km^{2} (397/sq mi)

Racial makeup (2011)
  - Black African: 14.6%
  - Coloured: 46.7%
  - White: 38.7%

First languages (2011)
  - Afrikaans: 72.8%
  - English: 15.6%
  - Xhosa: 7.6%
  - Sotho: 2.2%
  - Other: 1.9%
- Time zone: UTC+2 (SAST)
- Postal code (street): 9798

Oviston is a settlement in Walter Sisulu Local Municipality in Joe Gqabi District Municipality in the Eastern Cape province of South Africa.

Township 8 km north of Venterstad, on the southern bank of the Gariep Dam. It was established in 1964-65 to accommodate workers on the Orange-Fish River Tunnel. The name is derived from the Afrikaans Oranje-Vis-tonnel, ‘Orange-Fish Tunnel’, near the entrance to which it is situated.

== See also ==
- Oviston Nature Reserve
