= Tussen-die-Riviere Nature Reserve =

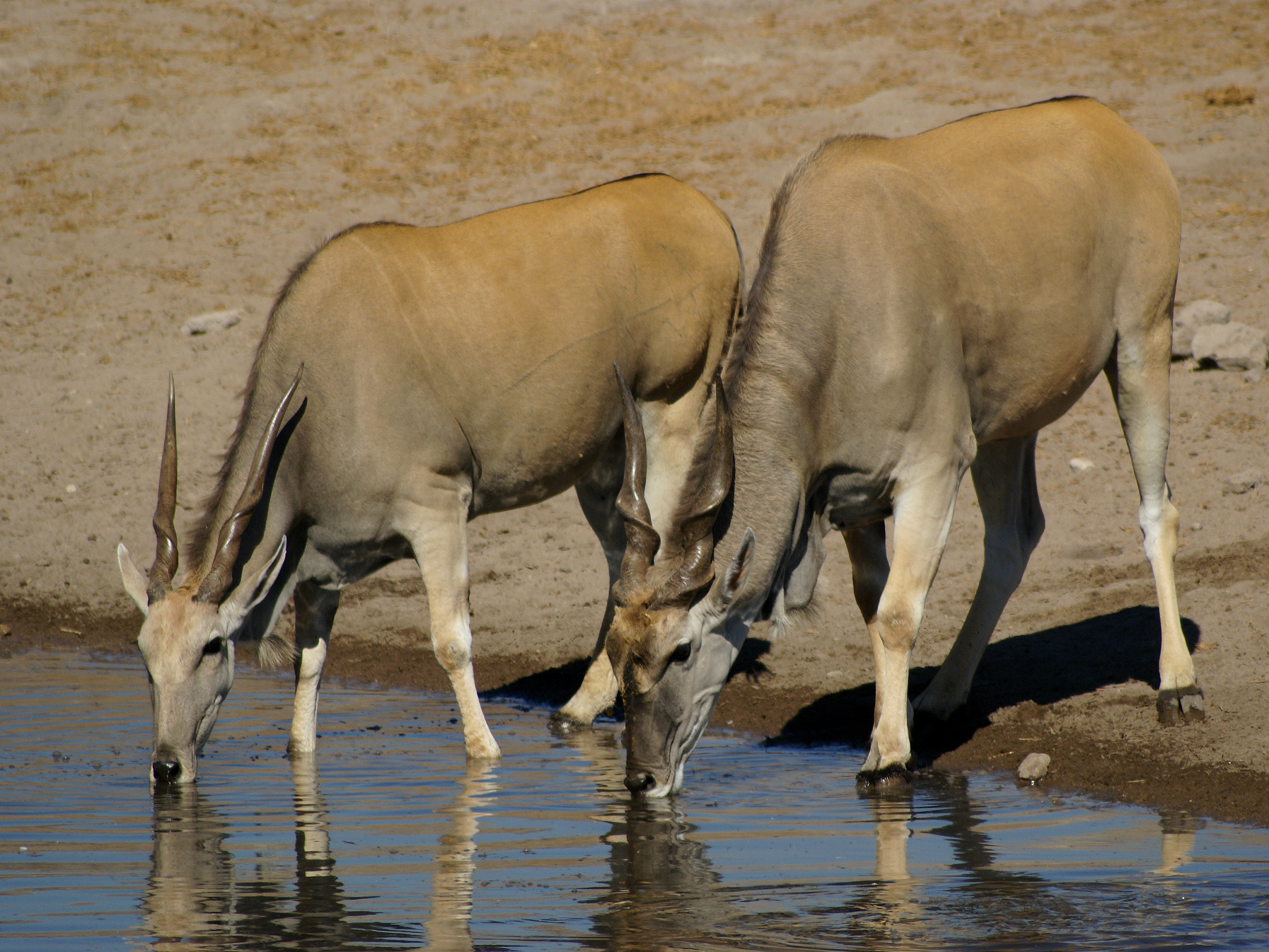
- Eland drinking water
- Interactive map of Tussen-die-Riviere Nature Reserve
- Coordinates: 30.468°S 26.118°E
- Operator: Free State Parks and Tourism

Tussen-die-Riviere Nature Reserve is a 22 000 ha nature reserve wedged between the Orange River and the Caledon River in the southern Free State, South Africa.

== Accommodation ==
There are nine self-catering chalets and five hunter's huts available on the reserve. Some 120 km of dirt roads are made available for game viewing with visitors' own vehicles.

== Wildlife ==
=== Antelopes ===
- Blesbok
- Black wildebeest and Blue wildebeest
- Eland
- Gemsbok
- Kudu
- Mountain reedbuck
- Red hartebeest
- Springbok
- Steenbok
- White rhino
- Zebra
