= Walter Sisulu Local Municipality =

Walter Sisulu
- Local municipality
- Location in the Eastern Cape
- Coordinates: 30°41′S 26°42′E
- Country: South Africa
- Province: Eastern Cape
- District: Joe Gqabi
- Seat: Burgersdorp

Government
  - Type: Municipal council
  - Mayor: Bulelwa Khweyiya (ANC)
  - Speaker: Nalisile Simon Mathetha (ANC)
  - Chief Whip: Norah Ngubo (ANC)

Area
  - Total: 13,269 km^{2} (5,123 sq mi)

Population (2011)
  - Total: 77,477
  - Density: 5.8389/km^{2} (15.123/sq mi)

Racial makeup (2011)
  - Black African: 79.9%
  - Coloured: 11.9%
  - White: 7.5%
- Time zone: UTC+2 (SAST)
- Municipal code: EC145

Walter Sisulu Municipality (Xhosa: uMasipala wase Walter Sisulu; Afrikaans: Walter Sisulu Munisipaliteit; Sotho: Masepala wa Walter Sisulu) is a local municipality within the Joe Gqabi District Municipality, in the Eastern Cape province of South Africa. The municipality was formed by merging the Maletswai and Gariep local municipalities immediately after the August 2016 local municipal elections.

== Main places ==
Main places in the municipality (historical Gariep and Maletswai) are:

Place	Code	Area (km^{2})	Population
Aliwal North	288002	7.95	16,001
Burgersdorp	289005	27.92	5,241
Dukathole	288001	4.98	19,152
Jamestown	288004	11.98	4,666
Khayamnandi	289008	2.67	4,724
Mzamomhle	289006	1.27	4,656
Venterstad	289003	0.47	1,393
Oviston	289001	358.88	658
Steynsburg	289009	14.70	2,488
Tembisa	289007	1.74	6,094
Venterstad	289002	17.59	3,596
Remainder of the municipality	288003 plus 289004	12,791.95	8,807

== Neighbours ==
The neighbour of Walter Sisulu Local Municipality in the Joe Gqabi District Municipality (DC14) is Senqu Local Municipality to the East. South of Walter Sisulu lies the Chris Hani District Municipality (DC13). On the Free State side is Mohokare Local Municipality in the Xhariep District Municipality (DC16).

== Politics ==
The municipal council consists of twenty-two members elected by mixed-member proportional representation. Eleven councillors are elected by first-past-the-post voting in eleven wards, while the remaining eleven are chosen from party lists so that the total number of party representatives is proportional to the number of votes received. In the 2021 South African municipal elections the African National Congress (ANC) won a reduced majority of twelve seats on the council.

The following table shows the results of the election.

Party	Ward			List			Total seats
Party	Votes	%	Seats	Votes	%	Seats	Total seats
African National Congress	9,325	55.41	9	9,367	55.71	3	12
Democratic Alliance	3,871	23.00	2	3,842	22.85	3	5
Economic Freedom Fighters	2,201	13.08	0	2,100	12.49	3	3
Maletswai Civic Association	1,147	6.82	0	1,237	7.36	2	2
African Transformation Movement	284	1.69	0	267	1.59	0	0
Total	16,828	100.00	11	16,813	100.00	11	22
Valid votes	16,828	98.55		16,813	98.55		
Invalid/blank votes	247	1.45		248	1.45		
Total votes	17,075	100.00		17,061	100.00		
Registered voters/turnout	36,110	47.29		36,110	47.25		
