= Orange River =

Major river in southern Africa

Orange River Kai Garib (Groote Rivier), Gariep, Senqu, Oranje, iGqili( isiZulu and isiXhosa)
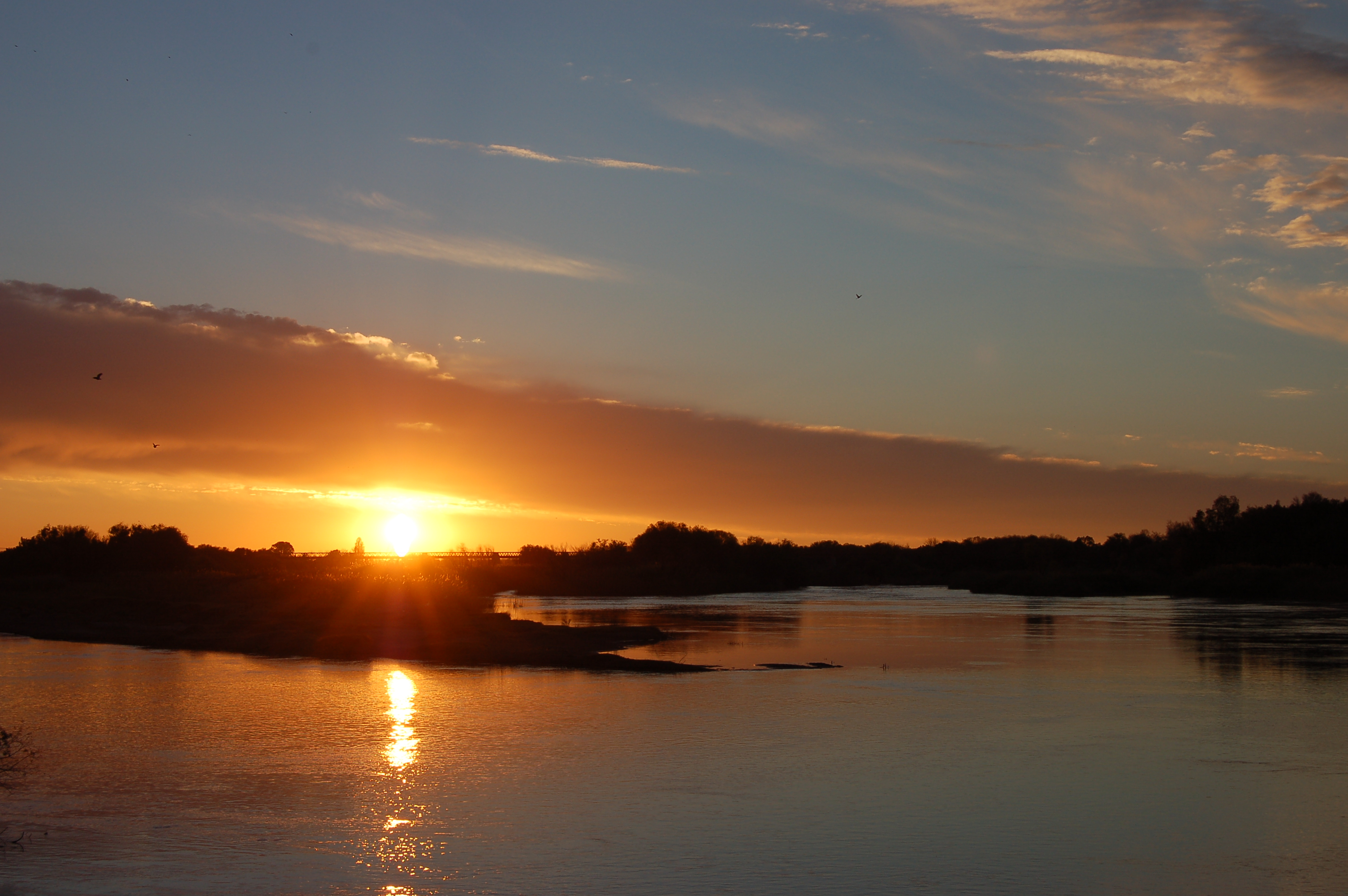
- Sunset over the Orange River near Upington in the Northern Cape
- Native name: Garip

Location
- Country: Lesotho, South Africa, Namibia
- District: Mokhotlong
- District: Thaba-Tseka
- District: Qacha's Nek, Quthing, Mohale's Hoek

Physical characteristics
- Source: Mont-aux-Sources
  - location: Maloti Mountains (Drakensberg), Lesotho
  - coordinates: 28°53′47″S 29°1′4″E
  - elevation: 3,350 m (10,990 ft)
- Mouth: Alexander Bay
  - location: Atlantic Ocean
  - coordinates: 28°37′58″S 16°27′08″E
- Length: 2,432 km (1,511 mi)
- Basin size: 973,000 km^{2} (376,000 sq mi)
- Discharge
  - average: 365 m^{3}/s (12,900 cu ft/s)

Basin features
- Tributaries
  - right: Caledon River, Vaal River, Fish River (Namibia)

Ramsar Wetland
- Official name: Orange River Mouth (Namibia)
- Designated: 23 August 1995
- Reference no.: 744

Ramsar Wetland
- Official name: Orange River Mouth (South Africa)
- Designated: 28 June 1991
- Reference no.: 526

The Orange River (from Afrikaans/Dutch: Oranjerivier) is a river in Southern Africa. It is the longest river in South Africa. With a total length of 2,432 km (1,511 mi), the Orange River Basin extends from Lesotho into South Africa and Namibia to the north. It rises in the Drakensberg mountains in Lesotho, flowing westwards through South Africa to the Atlantic Ocean. The river forms part of the international borders between South Africa and Lesotho and between South Africa and Namibia, as well as several provincial borders within South Africa. Except for Upington, it does not pass through any major cities. The Orange River plays an important role in the South African economy by providing water for irrigation and hydroelectric power. The river was named the Orange River in honour of the Dutch ruling family, the House of Orange, by the Dutch explorer Robert Jacob Gordon. Other names include simply the word for river, in Khoekhoegowab orthography written as !Garib, which is rendered in Afrikaans as Gariep River with the intrusion of a velar fricative in place of the alveolar click, Groote River (derived from Kai !Garib) or Senqu River (used in Lesotho), derived from ǂNū "Black". It is known in isiXhosa as iGqili.

== Course ==
The course and watershed of the Orange River, Caledon River and Vaal River (ǀHaiǃarib). This map shows a conservative border for the watershed. Specifically, the Kalahari basin is excluded, as some sources say it is endorheic. Some other sources using computational methods show a basin which includes parts of Botswana (and hence of the Kalahari).

The Orange rises in the Drakensberg mountains along the border between South Africa and Lesotho, about 193 km (120 mi) west of the Indian Ocean and at an altitude of over 3,000 m (9,800 ft). The extremity of the Orange River inside Lesotho is known as the Senqu. Parts of the Senqu River freeze in winter because of the high altitude. This creates droughts downstream, which mainly affect goat and cattle production.

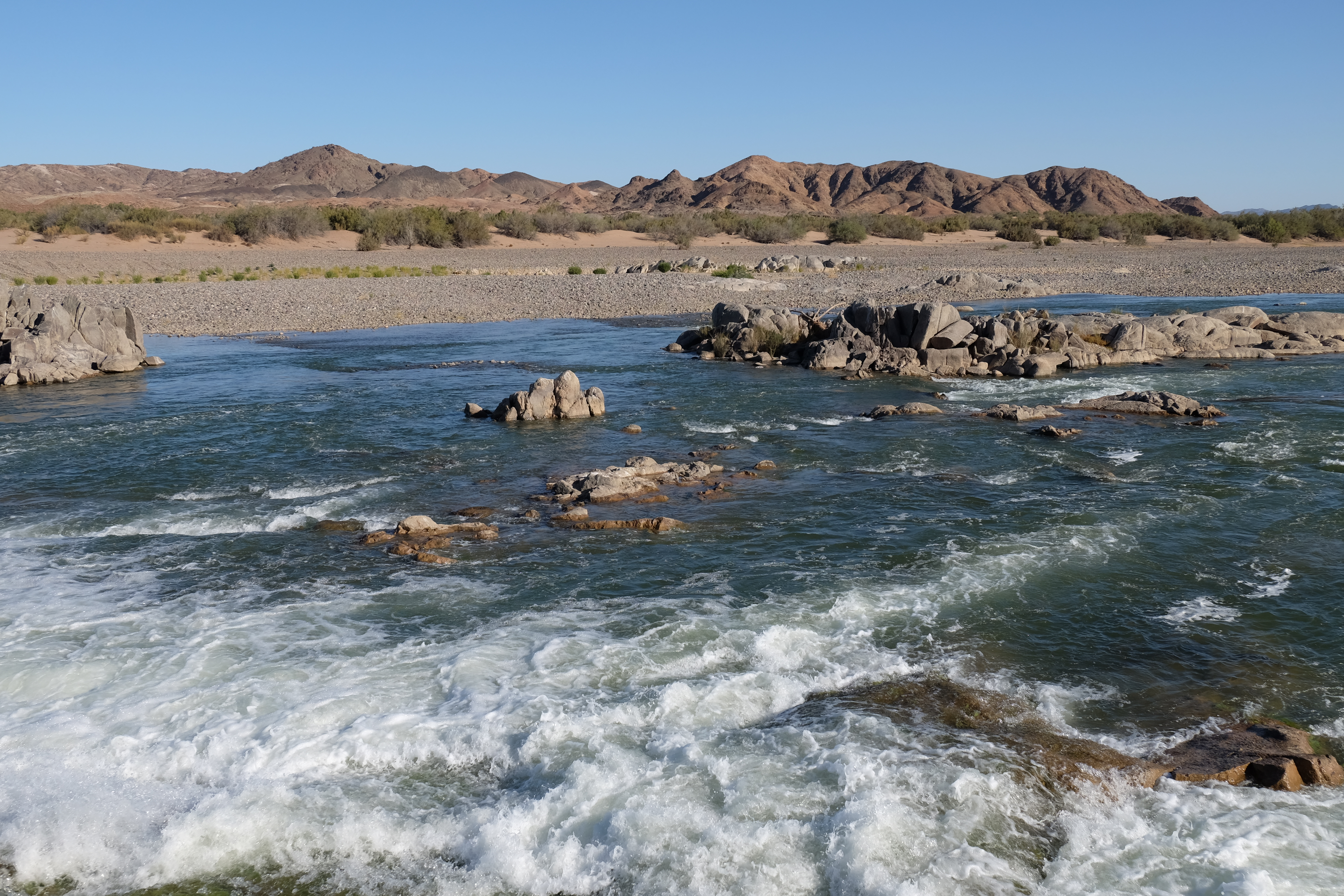
Orange River south of Rosh Pinah

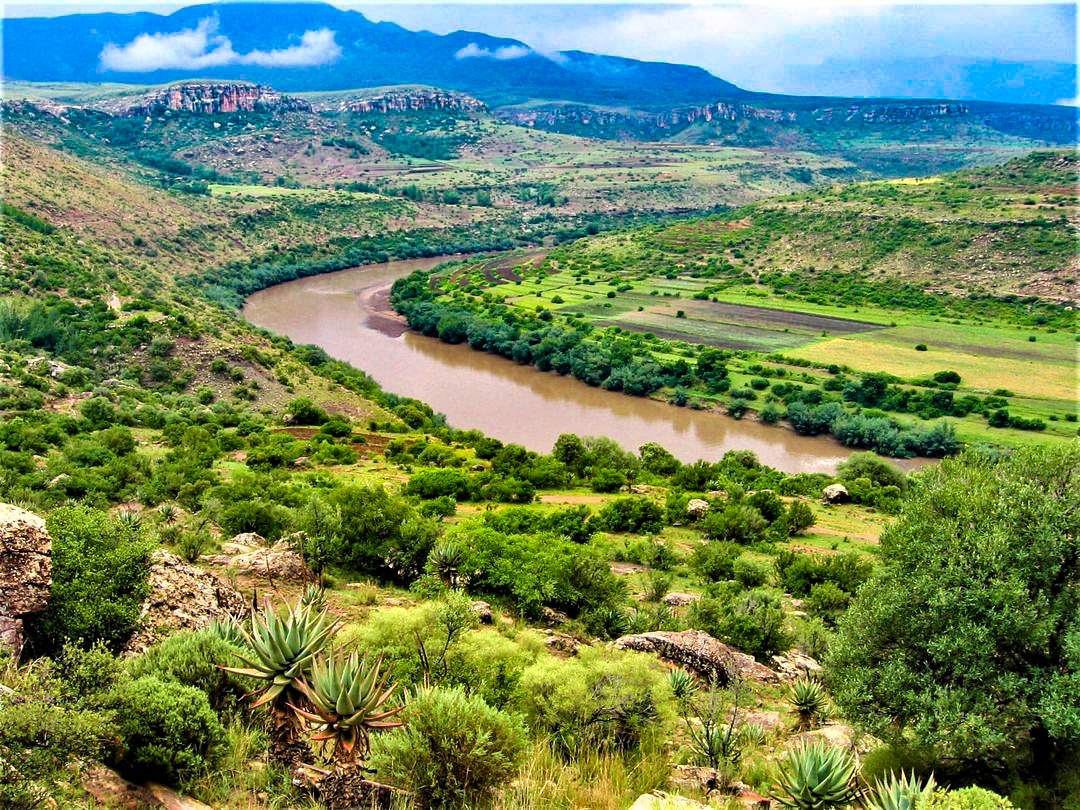
Senqu River Near Ha Potomane (Cutting Camp) in Quthing, Lesotho

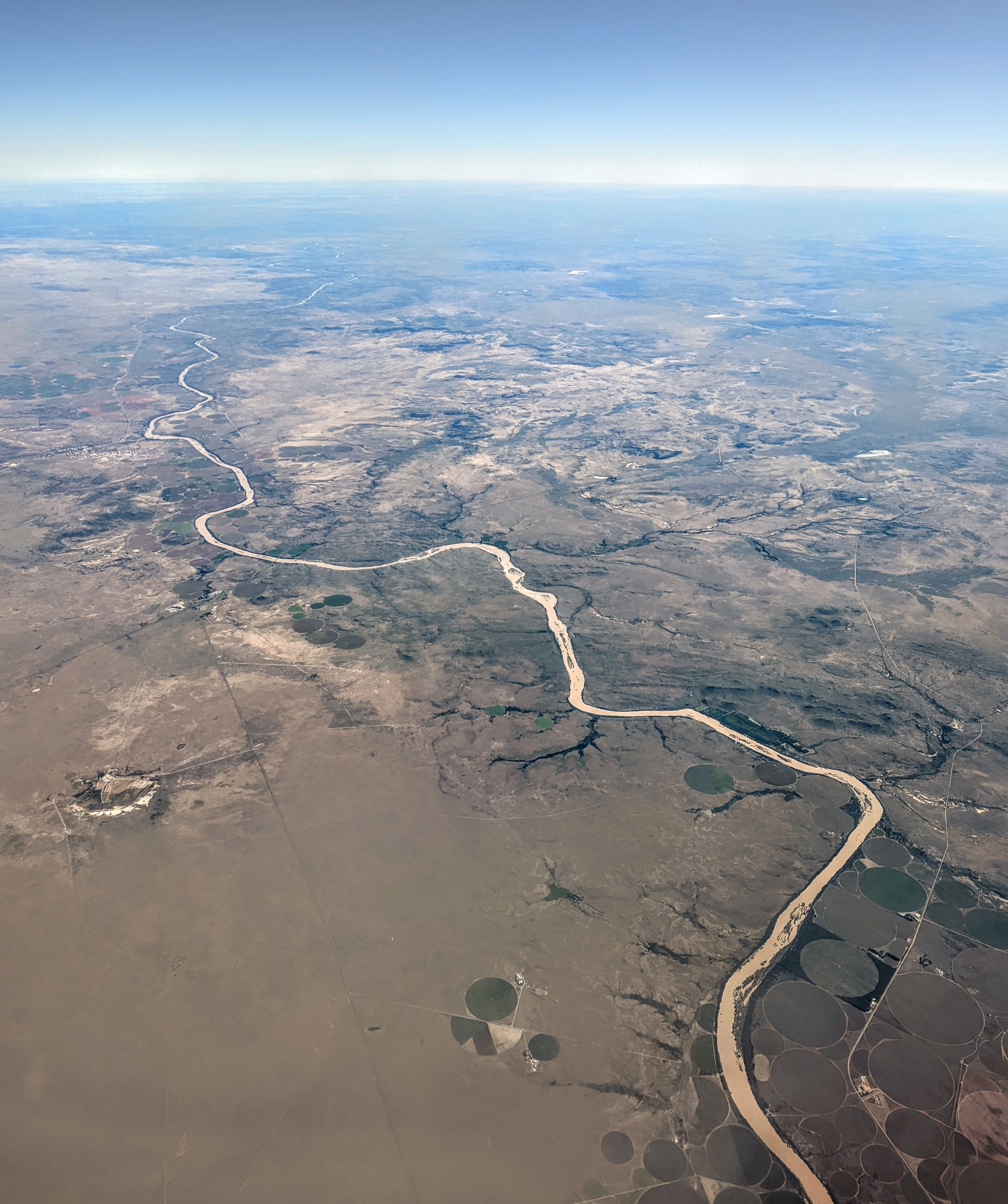
Orange River near Hopetown

The Orange River then runs westward through South Africa, forming the south-western boundary of the Free State province. In this section, the river flows first into the Gariep Dam and later into the Vanderkloof Dam. From the border of Lesotho to below the Vanderkloof Dam, the river bed is deeply incised. Further downstream, the land is flatter, and the river is used extensively for irrigation.

At the western point of the Free State, southwest of Kimberley, the Orange meets with its main tributary, the Vaal River, which forms much of the northern border of the province. From here, the river flows further westward through the arid wilderness of the southern Kalahari region and Namaqualand in the Northern Cape province to meet with Namibia at 20°E longitude. From here, it flows westward for 550 km (340 mi), forming the international border between the province and Namibia's ǁKaras Region. The river can be crossed at Vioolsdrif / Noordoewer, Alexander Bay / Orangemund border crossing by road and the Sendlingsdrif border crossing by ferry.

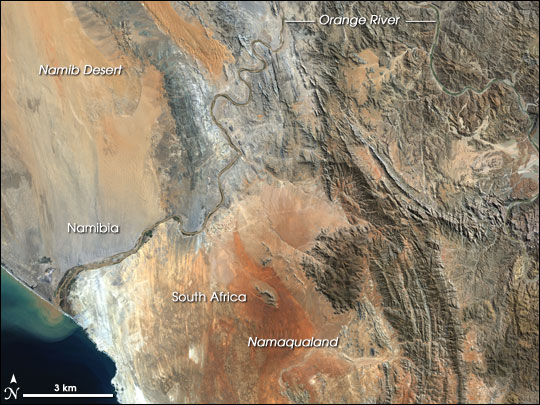
This image shows the last 100 km (62 mi) or so of the Orange River, in which the gravel deposits in the river bed and along the banks are rich with diamonds, and several diamond mines operate along this stretch.

In the last 800 km (500 mi) of its course, the Orange receives many intermittent streams (such as the Fish River), and several large wadis lead into it. In this section, the Namib Desert terminates on the north bank of the river, so under normal circumstances, the volume of water added by these tributaries is negligible. Here, the bed of the river is once again deeply incised. The Augrabies Falls are located on this section of the Orange, where the river descends 56 m (184 ft) in a course of 18 km (11 mi).

The Orange empties into the Atlantic Ocean between the small towns of Oranjemund (meaning "Orange mouth") in Namibia and Alexander Bay in South Africa, about equidistant between Walvis Bay and Cape Town. The Orange river mouth is a highly biodiverse area and is home to 57 different bird species with 20 653-26 653 individual birds being recorded in 1985. It is a recognised Ramsar site being one of the few perennial wetlands on the semi-arid South-West African coast. Some 33 km (21 mi) from its mouth, it is obstructed by rapids and sand bars and is generally not navigable for long stretches.The river has a total length of 2,432 km (1,511 mi).

=== Catchment and rainfall ===
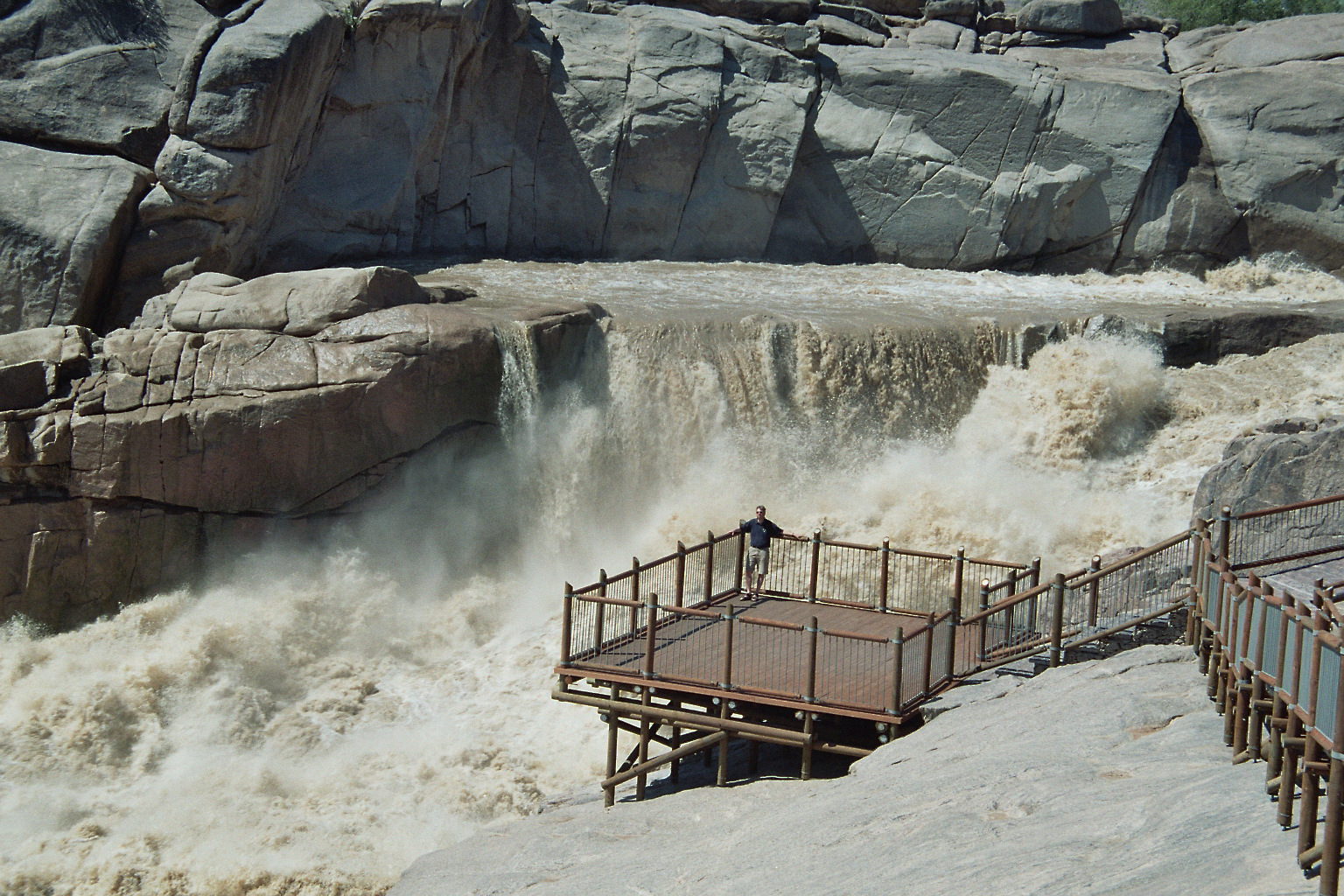
The Augrabies Falls in full flow

In the dry season, the volume of the water in the river is considerably reduced because of the rapid run-off and evaporation. At the source of the Orange, the rainfall is about 2,000 mm (79 in) per annum, but precipitation decreases as the river flows westward; at its mouth, the rainfall is less than 50 mm (2.0 in) per year. The factors that support evaporation, though, tend to increase in a westerly direction. In the wet season (summer), the Orange river becomes a brown coloured torrent. The huge mass of sediment carried constitutes a long-term threat to engineering projects on the river.

The total catchment of the Orange River (including the Vaal) extends over 973,000 km^{2} (376,000 sq mi), i.e. equivalent to about 77% of the land area of South Africa (1,221,037 km^{2} (471,445 sq mi)). Around 366,000 km^{2} (141,000 sq mi) (38%), however, are situated outside the country in Lesotho, Botswana, and Namibia.

=== Tributaries ===
- Vaal River - 1,458 km (906 mi)
- Caledon River - 642 km (399 mi)
- Khubelu River - 144 km (89 mi)

== Tributary system ==
The upper Orange River is fed by numerous tributaries that originate in the highlands of Lesotho and South Africa. Among the principal upper tributaries are the Caledon River, Little Caledon River, Kraai River, Kornetspruit, and Senqunyane River, many of which drain the Maloti Mountains before joining the main channel.

These tributaries provide much of the Orange River's annual discharge because the highest precipitation in the basin occurs over the mountainous catchments of Lesotho. Snowfall and seasonal rainfall contribute significantly to streamflow during the austral summer.

Several upper tributaries are regulated by reservoirs associated with the Lesotho Highlands Water Project, which supplies water to South Africa while generating hydroelectric power for Lesotho.

=== Dams ===
- Armenia Dam
- Egmont Dam
- Gariep Dam
- Newberry Dam
- Vanderkloof Dam
- Welbedacht Dam
- Knellport Dam
- Kalkfontein Dam
- Teirpoort Dam
- Mohale Dam
- Katse Dam
- Rustfontein Dam

== History ==
=== Etymology ===
Some of the earliest precolonial inhabitants called the river ǂNūǃarib, referring to its black colour, or sometimes just Kai !Arib ("Great River"), from which is derived the Afrikaans version Gariep, and translation "Groote Rivier". The early Dutch name for the river was just that translation, Groote Rivier, meaning "Great River". The river was named the Orange River by Colonel Robert Gordon, commander of the United East India Company (VOC) garrison at Cape Town, on a trip to the interior in 1779. Gordon named the river in honor of William V of Orange. A popular but incorrect belief is that the river was named after the supposedly orange color of its water, as opposed to the color of its tributary, the Vaal River, which name is derived from the name ǀHaiǃarib "pale river" (vaal being Afrikaans for pale or grey). Since the end of apartheid, the name "Gariep" has had greater favor in official correspondence in South Africa, although the name "Orange" has greater international recognition. In Lesotho, where the river rises, it is known as the Senqu River, derived from the original Khoemana name.

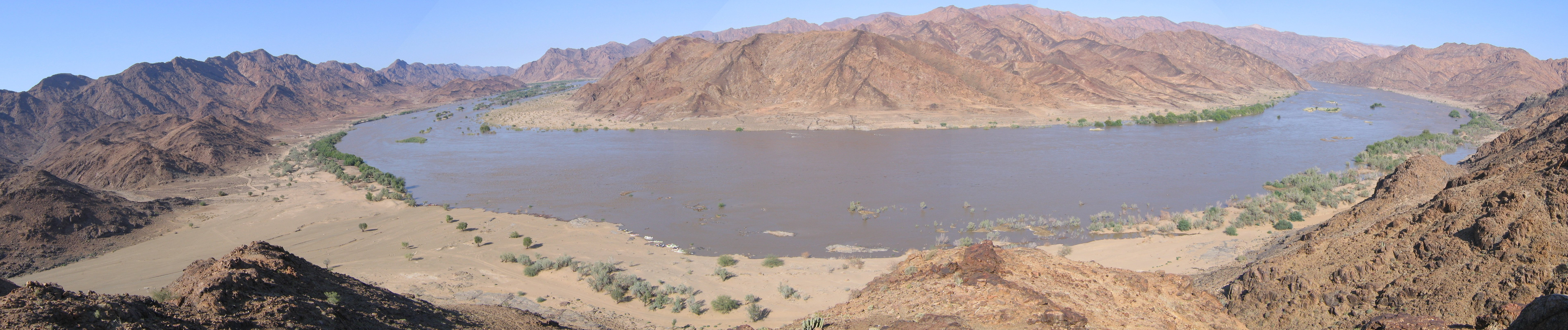
Panorama taken from a fluorspar-rich hill overlooking a bend in the River, which was in flood due to above-normal rains

The Eastern Cape Geographical Names Committee has advertised its intention to consider a name change from the colonial name, for that portion of the river that forms the border between the Eastern Cape and the Free State, with suggestions being IGqili or Senqu. The advertisement placed in the Aliwal Weekblad newspaper states that the "present name is perceived to have a strong association with the history of colonial subjugation and has therefore no place under the current democratic dispensation."

=== The Grootslang ===
In South African folklore, the Orange River is often associated with the Grootslang, a mythical being resembling a giant serpent, which is often connected to the river's alluvial diamonds. The Grootslang is described as living in a gem-filled cave connected to the Orange River by a natural pipe through which the diamonds gradually enter the river. Other sites said to be lairs of the creature include the pool beneath the King George Cataract at Aughrabies Falls, which is also said to be a source of diamonds, and a large rock in the middle of the river itself. In this version of the legend, the Grootslang is also said to prey on cattle from the river's banks.

== Economy ==
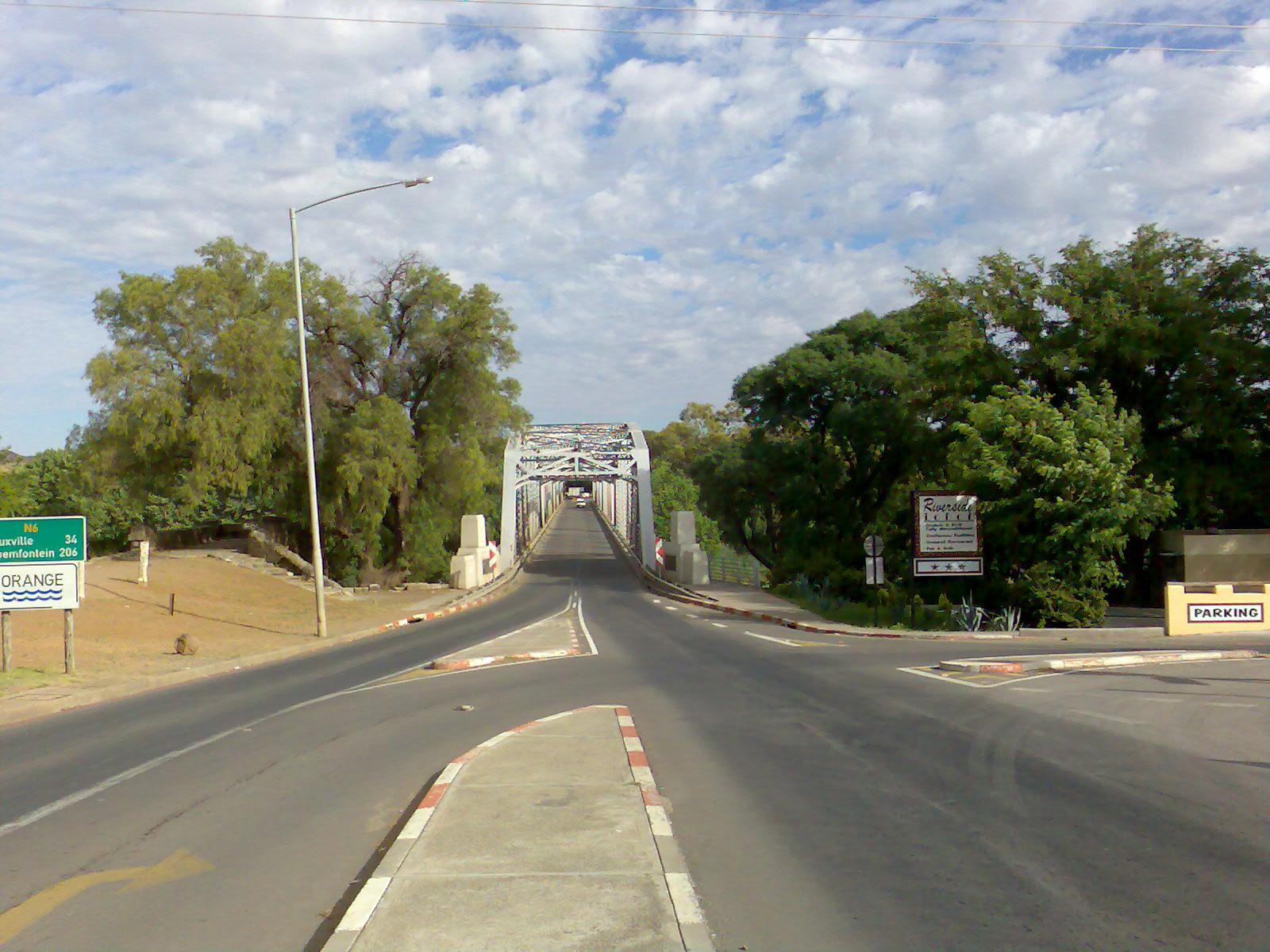
The General Hertzog Bridge over the Orange River at Aliwal North on the southwestern border with the Free State: Note the remains of the Frere Bridge on the left.

As the primary source of water for the majority of South Africa, the Orange River plays a crucial role in supporting agriculture, industry, and mining. To assist in this, two large water schemes have been created, the Orange River Project and the Lesotho Highlands Water Project. Historically, the river played an important role in the South African diamond rush, with the first diamonds in the country being discovered in alluvial deposits on the Orange. Today, commercial diamond mines operate along the final stretch of the Orange River and around its mouth, while oil and gas prospecting rights and permits have been granted to several companies.

Because of the lack of dangerous animals and high water levels during summer, the river is used for recreational canoeing and rafting. Orange River rafting has become very popular with many companies using their camps along the river from which to operate. The most popular trips are four-day and six-day river trips that take place either along the gorge below the Augrabies Falls or along the Richtersveld area.

=== Orange River Project ===
The Orange River Project (ORP) was one of the largest and most imaginative projects of its kind in South Africa. It was constructed by Hendrik Verwoerd's government at the height of the apartheid era. The ORP was built to exploit the waters of the Orange River—which, without the Vaal River, represents some 14.1% of the total runoff in South Africa—and in the process, to satisfy an increasing demand for water. The main objectives of the project were:

- to stabilise river flow,
- the generation and transmission of hydroelectric power,
- to provide a reliable water supply for users in the Orange River basin, and
- to give a new lease on life to water-deficient areas in the Eastern Cape, such as the Great Fish and Sundays River valleys.

The Gariep Dam near Colesberg is the main storage structure within the Orange River. From here, the water is supplied in two directions, westward along the Orange River (via hydroelectric power generators) to the Vanderkloof Dam and southward through the Orange-Fish Tunnel to the Eastern Cape.

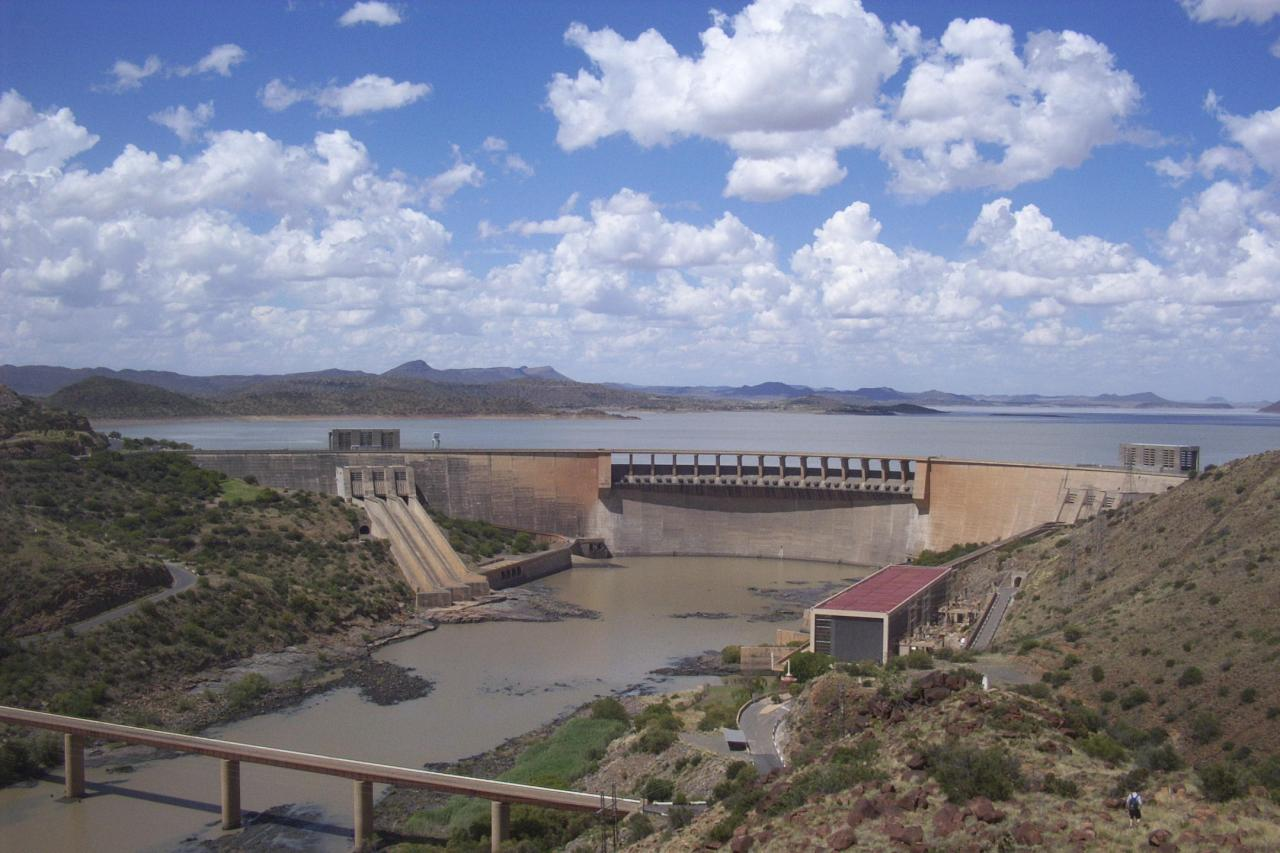
The Gariep Dam on the Orange River is the largest dam in South Africa, and was a key part of the Orange River Project.

==== Hydroelectricity ====
Eskom operates hydroelectric power stations at both the Gariep Dam and the Vanderkloof Dam. The hydroelectric power station at the Vanderkloof Dam was the first power-generation station in South Africa situated entirely underground. The towns Oviston and Oranjekrag were established to facilitate the construction and operation of the new infrastructure.

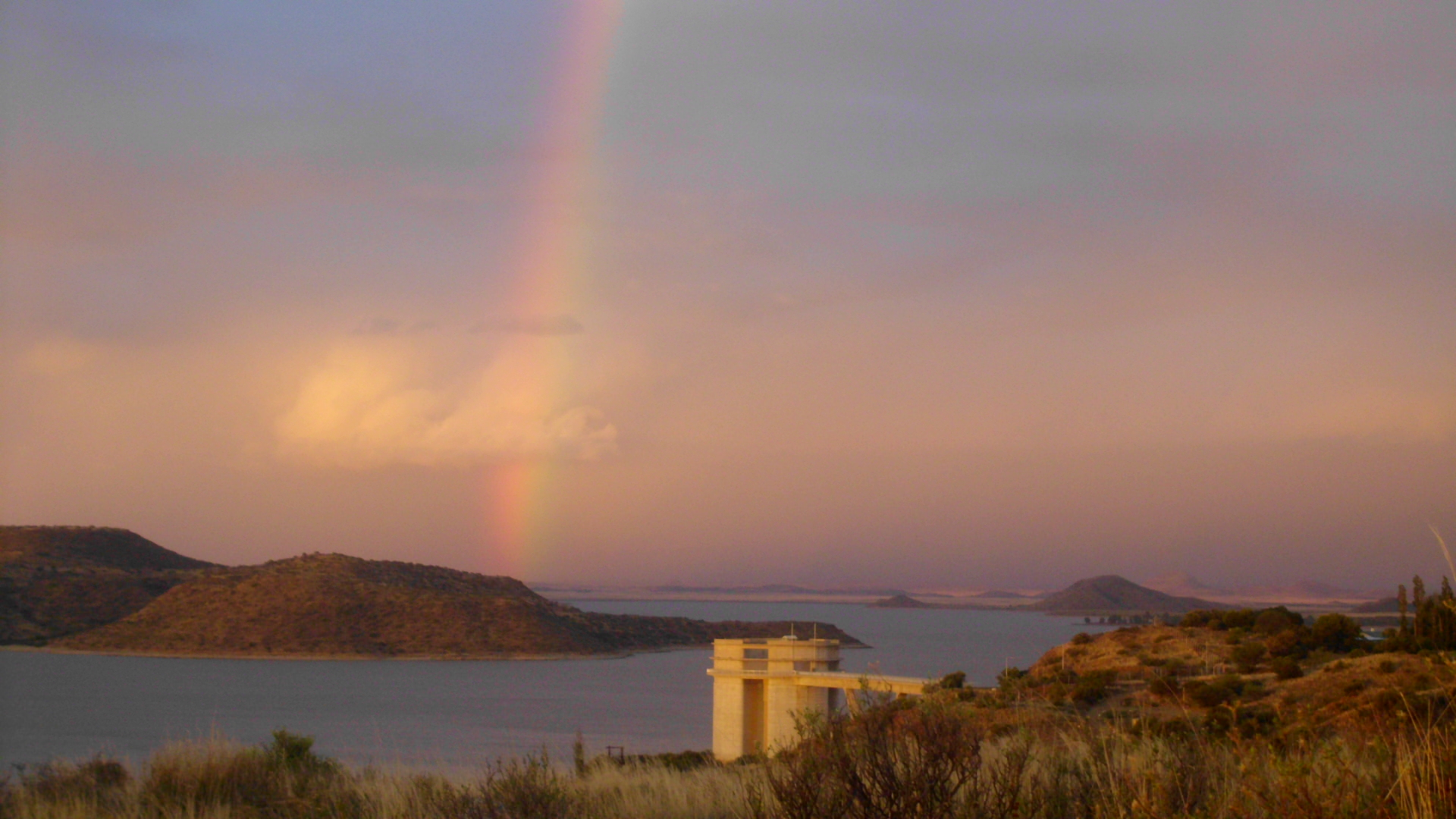
View over the eastern part of the dam, with the water intake at Oviston

==== Irrigation ====
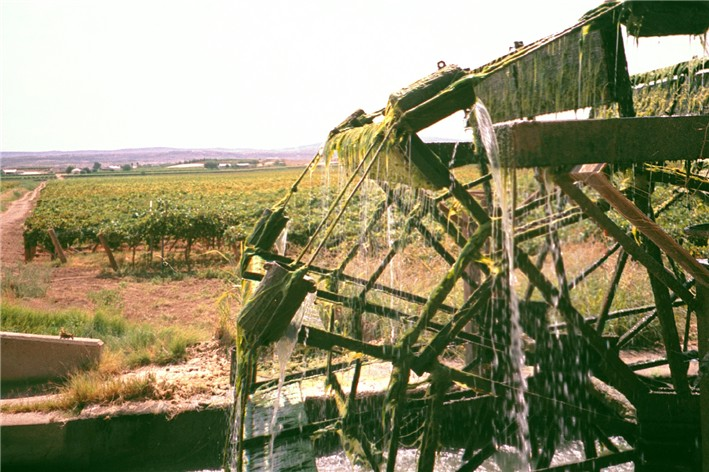
A vineyard on the Orange River

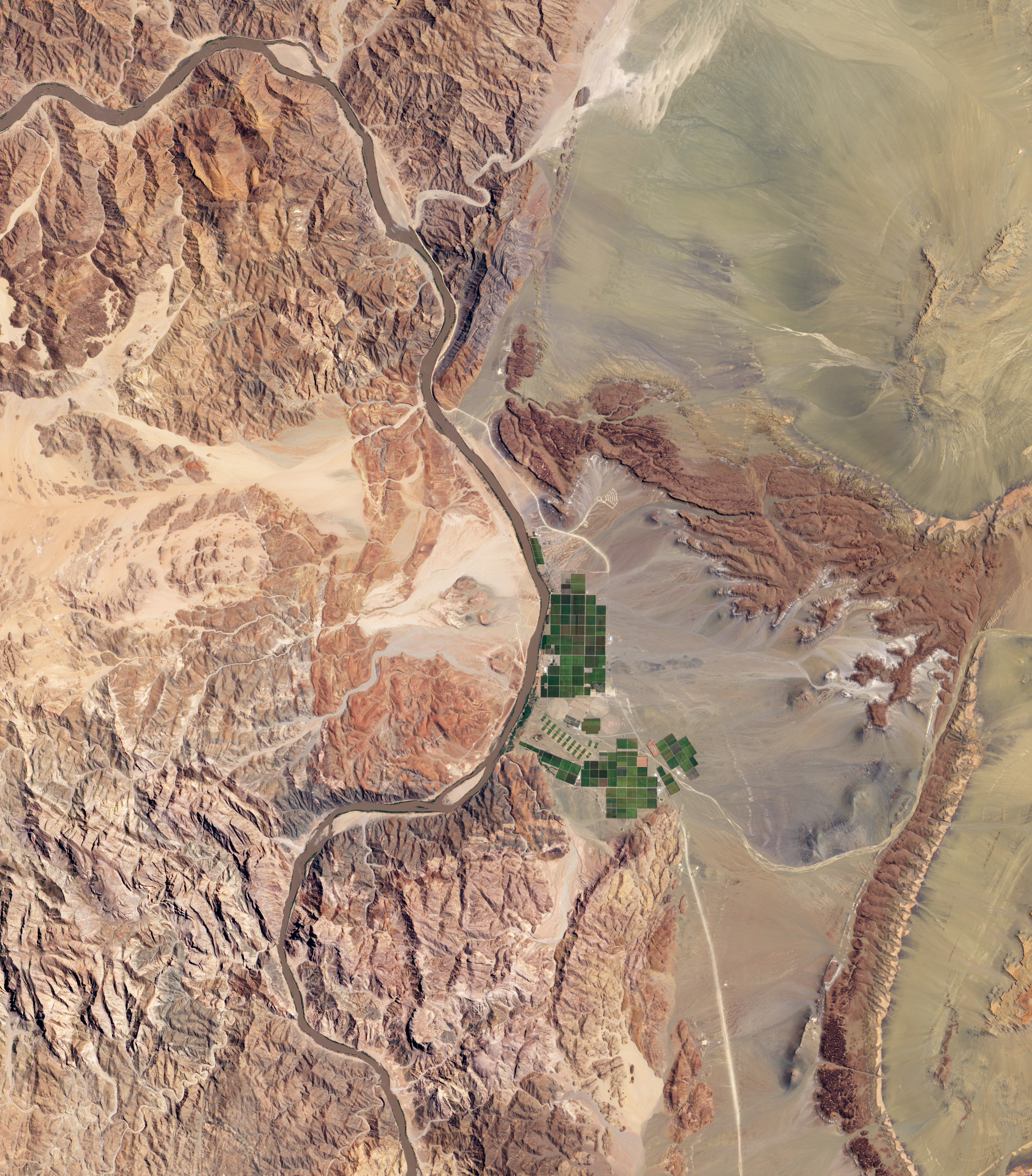
Various irrigation projects along the river

Irrigation in the vast area downstream of the Vanderkloof Dam, which has turned thousands of hectares of arid veld into highly productive agricultural land, was made possible by the construction of the Gariep and Vanderkloof Dams. Old established irrigation schemes such as those at Buchuberg, Upington, Kakamas, and Vioolsdrif have also benefitted because regulation of the flow is now possible. On the Namibian side of the river, Aussenkehr produces grapes with the help of water from the Orange.

In recent years, the wine-producing areas along the Orange River have grown in importance. Irrigation in the Eastern Cape has also received a tremendous boost, not only from the additional water being made available, but also owing to improvement in water quality. Without this improvement, the citrus farmers along the Lower Sundays River would almost certainly have continued to suffer losses of productivity.

=== Lesotho Highlands Water Project ===
The Lesotho Highlands Water Project was conceived to supplement the water supply in the Vaal River System. Water is delivered to South Africa by means of the delivery tunnel which passes under the Lesotho South Africa border at the Caledon River, and then under the Little Caledon River south of Clarens in the Free State, and discharges into the Ash River about 30 kilometres (19 mi) further to the north. The scheme became viable when water demands in Gauteng reached levels that could no longer be supported economically by alternative schemes such as the Tugela River-Vaal River pumped storage scheme, which used the Sterkfontein Dam, located near Harrismith in the Free State.

=== Alluvial diamonds ===
In 1867, the first diamond discovered in South Africa, the Eureka Diamond, was found near Hopetown on the Orange River. Two years later, a much larger diamond known as the Star of South Africa was found in the same area, causing a diamond rush. This was soon eclipsed by the diamond rush to mine diamonds directly from kimberlite at Kimberley in 1871, although alluvial diamonds continued to be found in the Orange. Today, several commercial diamond mines operate on the last stretch of the river, as well as the beaches around its mouth. Diamond mines also operate on the middle stretch of the river.

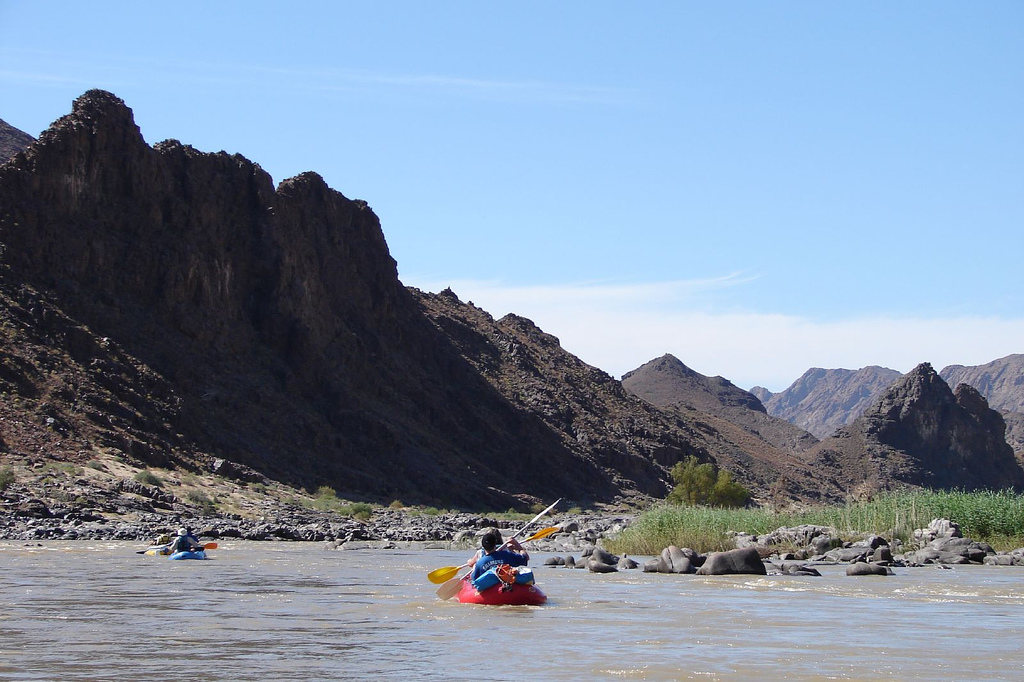
Rafting on the Orange River is a popular tourist activity.

=== Rafting and canoeing ===
During the temperate months of March and April, given good rains and the sluices of the dams being open, a canoeist (or rafter) can easily travel 30 kilometres (19 mi) per day. The lower reaches of the river are most popular, because of the spectacular topography. Commercial tours are available, and these expeditions depart from the border town of Vioolsdrif.

== Wildlife ==
The Orange River has no large animals. It lies outside the range of the Nile crocodile, and although hippopotami were once abundant, they were hunted to extermination in the 19th century. The Orange River has a relative paucity of species diversity. Surveys from 1995 to 2001 in the Lower Orange River found 19 different fish species from eight different families. The two non-native species recorded in the surveys were Cyprinus carpio and Oreochromis mossambicus, the latter of which had increased rapidly in abundance since the early 1980s. Another exotic species, rainbow trout, is found in the river headwaters in Lesotho.

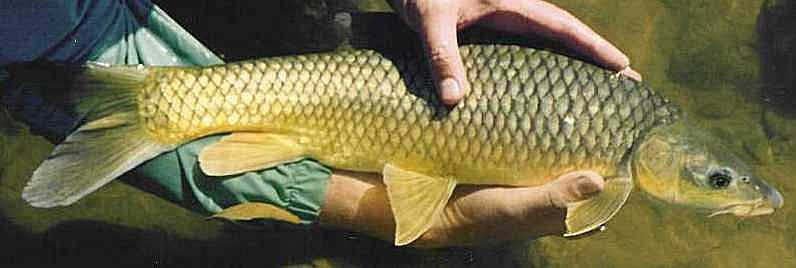
The smallmouth yellowfish (Labeobarbus aeneus) is a popular sport fish endemic to the Orange-Vaal River system.

Seven species are endemic to the Vaal-Orange River system:

- Rock-catfish (Austroglanis sclateri)
- Maluti redfin or Maloti minnow (Pseudobarbus quathlambae)
- Namaquab barb (Barbus hospes)
- River sardine (Mesobola brevianalis)
- Smallmouth yellowfish (Labeobarbus aeneus)
- Largemouth yellowfish (Labeobarbus kimberlyensis)
- Orange River Mudfish (Labeo capensis)

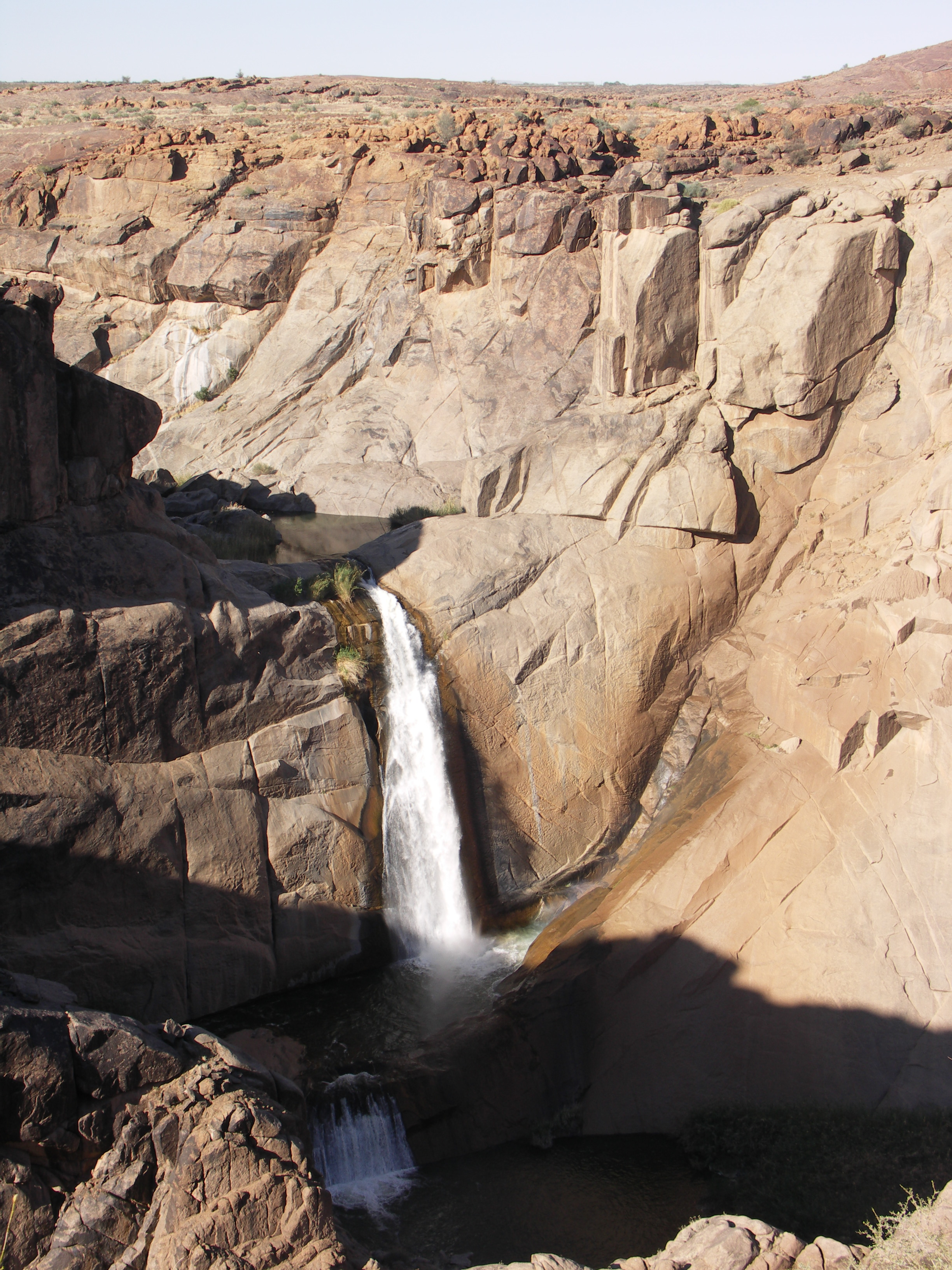
Twin Falls in Augrabies Falls National Park

== See also ==
- List of rivers in South Africa
- List of international border rivers
- List of crossings of the Orange River
