= Gariep Dam =

Dam in Eastern Cape and Free State, South Africa

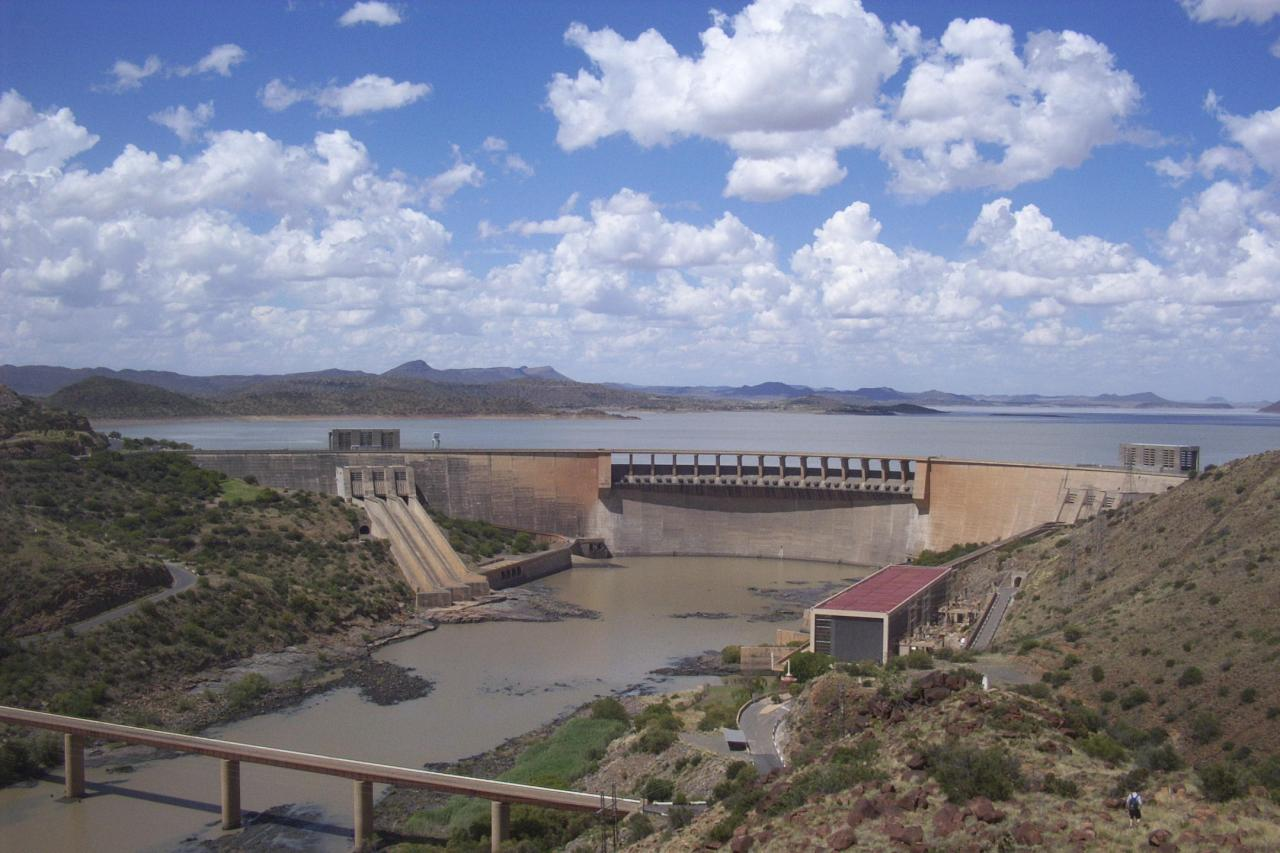

- Location within South Africa
- Official name: Gariep Dam
- Location: Border of Eastern Cape and Free State, South Africa
- Coordinates: 30°37′25.43″S 25°30′23.81″E
- Construction began: 1965
- Opening date: 1971
- Owner: Department of Water Affairs

Dam and spillways
- Type of dam: Arch-gravity dam
- Impounds: Orange River
- Height: 88 m (289 ft)
- Length: 914 m (2,999 ft)

Reservoir
- Creates: Gariep Dam Reservoir
- Total capacity: 5,340,000 megalitres (5,340 hm^{3}; 5.34×10^{9} m^{3})
- Surface area: 374 km^{2} (144 sq mi)

Power Station
- Operator: Eskom
- Turbines: 4 x 90 MW (120,000 hp)
- Installed capacity: 360 MW (480,000 hp) (max)
- Annual generation: 889 GWh (3,200 TJ)

The Gariep Dam is located in South Africa, near the town of Norvalspont, bordering the Free State and Eastern Cape provinces. Its primary purpose is for irrigation, domestic and industrial use as well as for power generation. It is the largest dam in South Africa.

== Name ==
The Gariep Dam, at its commission in 1971, was originally named the Hendrik Verwoerd Dam after Hendrik Verwoerd, the Prime Minister before and after 31 May 1961, when the country changed from the Union of South Africa to the Republic of South Africa. However, after the end of apartheid, the Verwoerd name was considered unsuitable. The name was officially changed to Gariep Dam on 4 October 1996. Gariep is Khoekhoe for "river", the original name of the Orange River (the longest river in South Africa).

== Location ==
The dam is on the Orange River about 48 kilometres (30 mi) north-east of Colesberg and 208 kilometres (129 mi) south of Bloemfontein. It is in a gorge at the entrance to the Ruigte Valley some 5 kilometres (3.1 mi) east of Norvalspont. The dam crest is some 1,300 metres (4,300 ft) above sea level.

== Dimensions ==
The wall is 88 m high and has a crest length of 914 m and contains approximately 1.73 million m^{3} of concrete. The Gariep Dam is the largest storage reservoir in South Africa. In South African English, 'dam' refers both to the structure and the water volume it retains. Gariep Dam has a total storage capacity of approximately 5,340,000 megalitres (5,340 hm^{3}) and a surface area of more than 370 square kilometres (140 sq mi) when full. The hydro-electrical power station houses four 90-MW generators.

== Design type and contractors ==
The structure is a concrete gravity-arch hybrid dam. This design was chosen as the gorge is too wide for a complete arch so flanking walls form gravity abutments to the central arch.

It was built by Dumez, a French construction company.

== Gariep Dam Bridge ==
Gariep Dam bridge
- Coordinates: 30°37′22″S 25°30′23″E
- Carries: 14300 tons

Characteristics
- Width: Doubleway

Statistics
- Toll: None

Location
- Interactive map of Gariep Dam bridge

== Rivers and spruits flowing into the dam ==
- Orange River
- Caledon River
- Brakspruit
- Broekspruit
- Oudagspruit
- Palmietspruit
- Slykspruit

== Water consumption, outflow, derivative usages and diversions ==
It must be carefully managed by balancing the supply-and-demand of this water resource usage for its derivatives of electricity generation, irrigation, and municipal drinking water. There is trade off in the water usage for electricity and inter-basin transfer for water in other areas like Port Elizabeth.

=== Orange–Fish Water Scheme ===
The scheme diverts water from the Orange River to the Great Fish River valley.

- Great Fish River Valley, then via Grassridge Dam, ElandsDrift Wier, Cookhouse Tunnel, De MistKraal Weir into
- Sundays River Valley (Canals and Tunnels Scheme) North-West of Port Elizabeth, then via Darlington Dam, Korhaansdrift Weir, Canal, Scheepersvlakte Balancing Dam, Bulk water Pipeline to
- Port Elizabeth, Nooitgedracht Water Treatment Works, since 1992 with water from the Sundays River Valley (See External links for more video documentaries on construction and drone footage for canal system.)

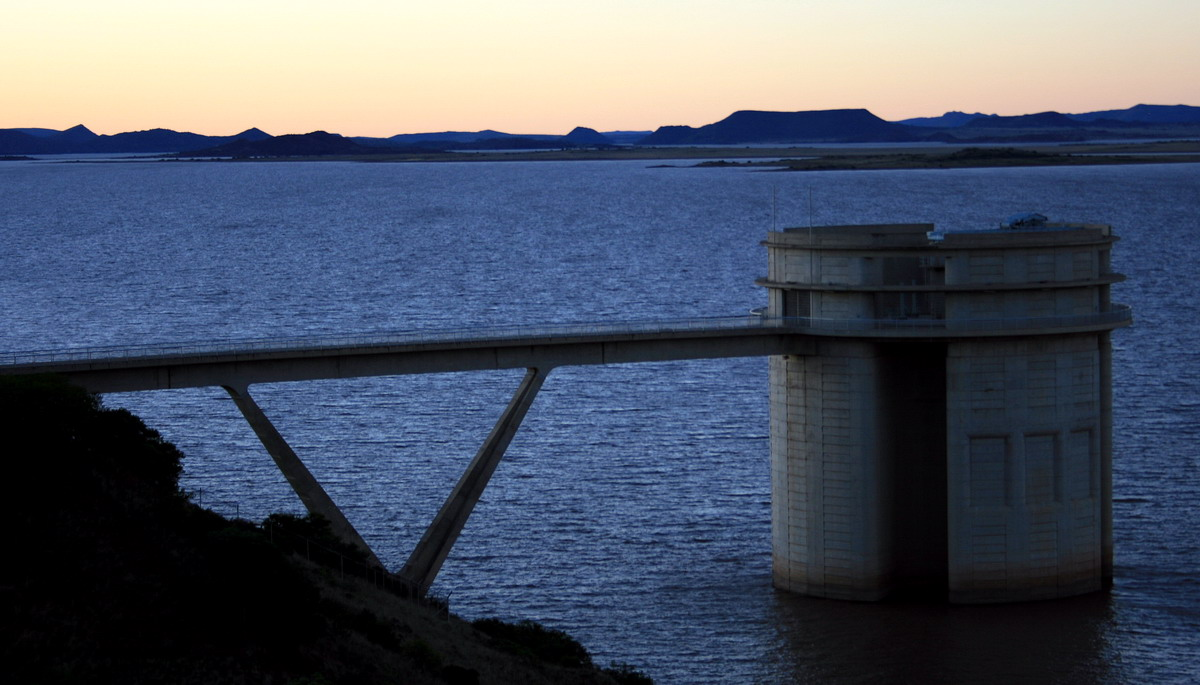
Tunnel inlet

=== Orange-Fish River Tunnel ===
At Oviston, on the south bank of the reservoir, is the inlet of the Orange-Fish River Tunnel, allowing water to be diverted to the Great Fish River and most of the Eastern Cape's western parts.

=== Gariep hydroelectric power plant ===
A 360-MW hydroelectric power plant is one is run by Eskom. Four 90-MW hydro turbines (which are remotely controlled from Gauteng)

== Gallery ==
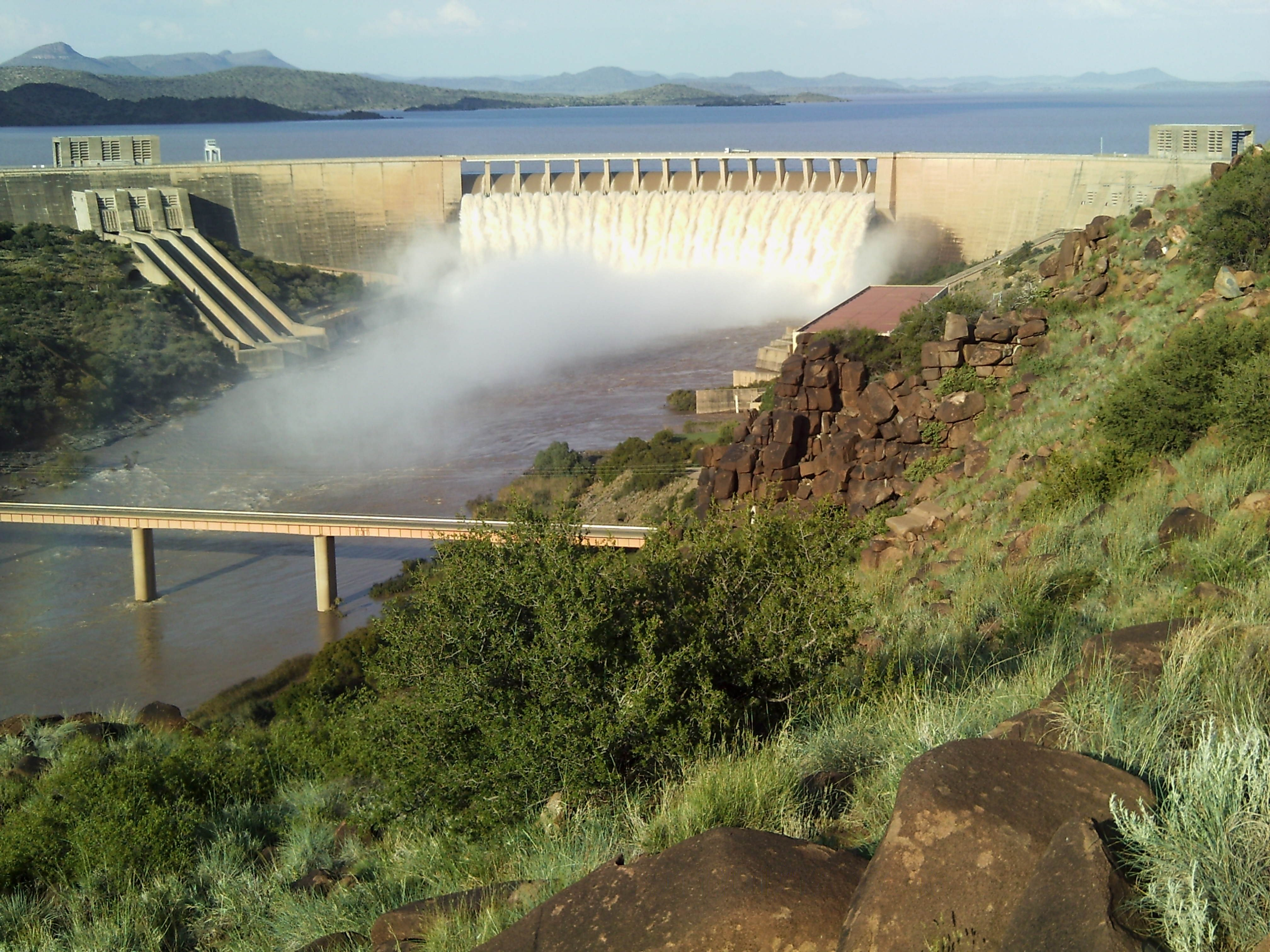
Gariep Dam overflowing in January 2011

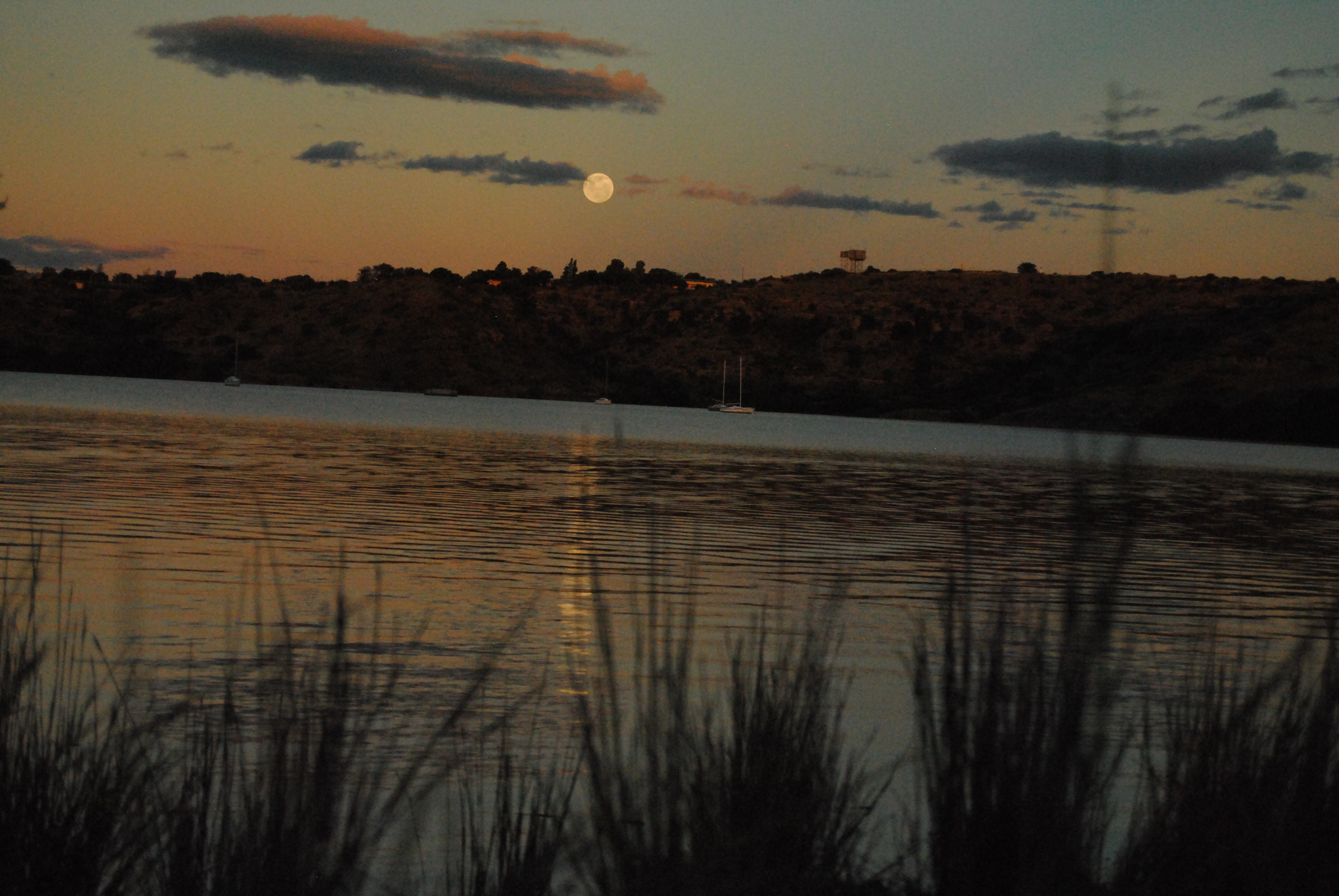
Sunset at Oviston Nature Reserve on the dam's southern shores

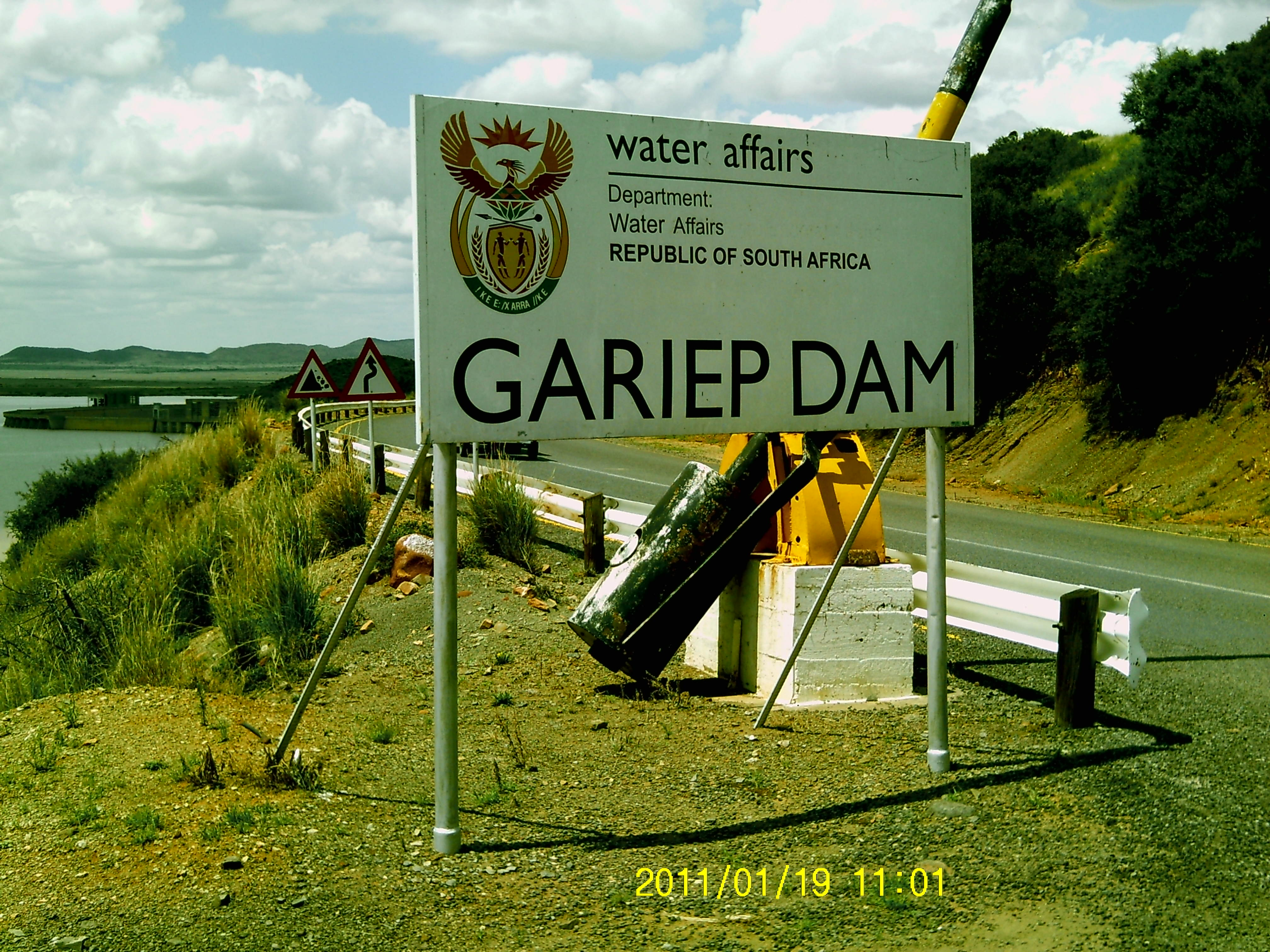
Road sign heading for the dam wall

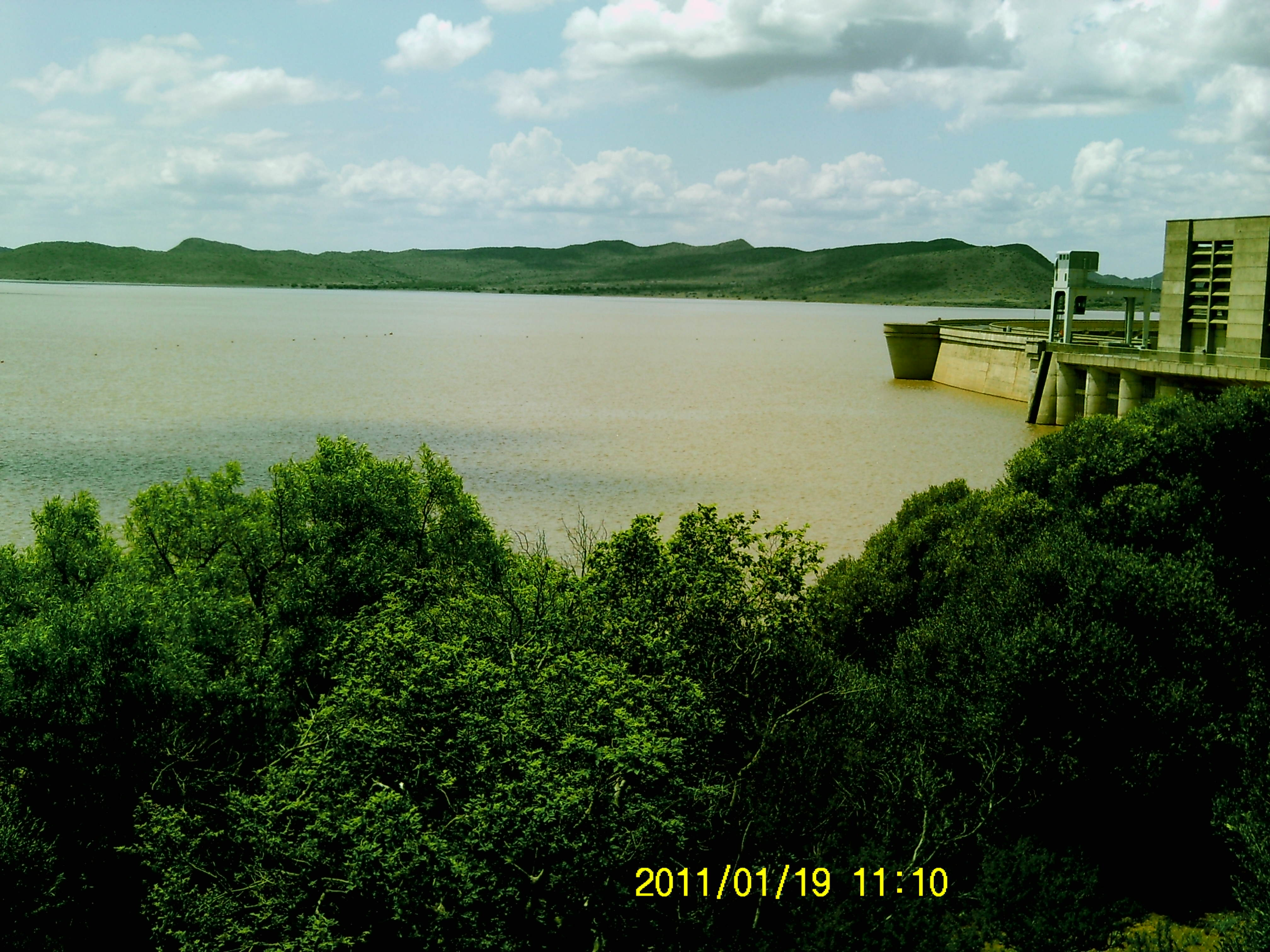
View over the lake

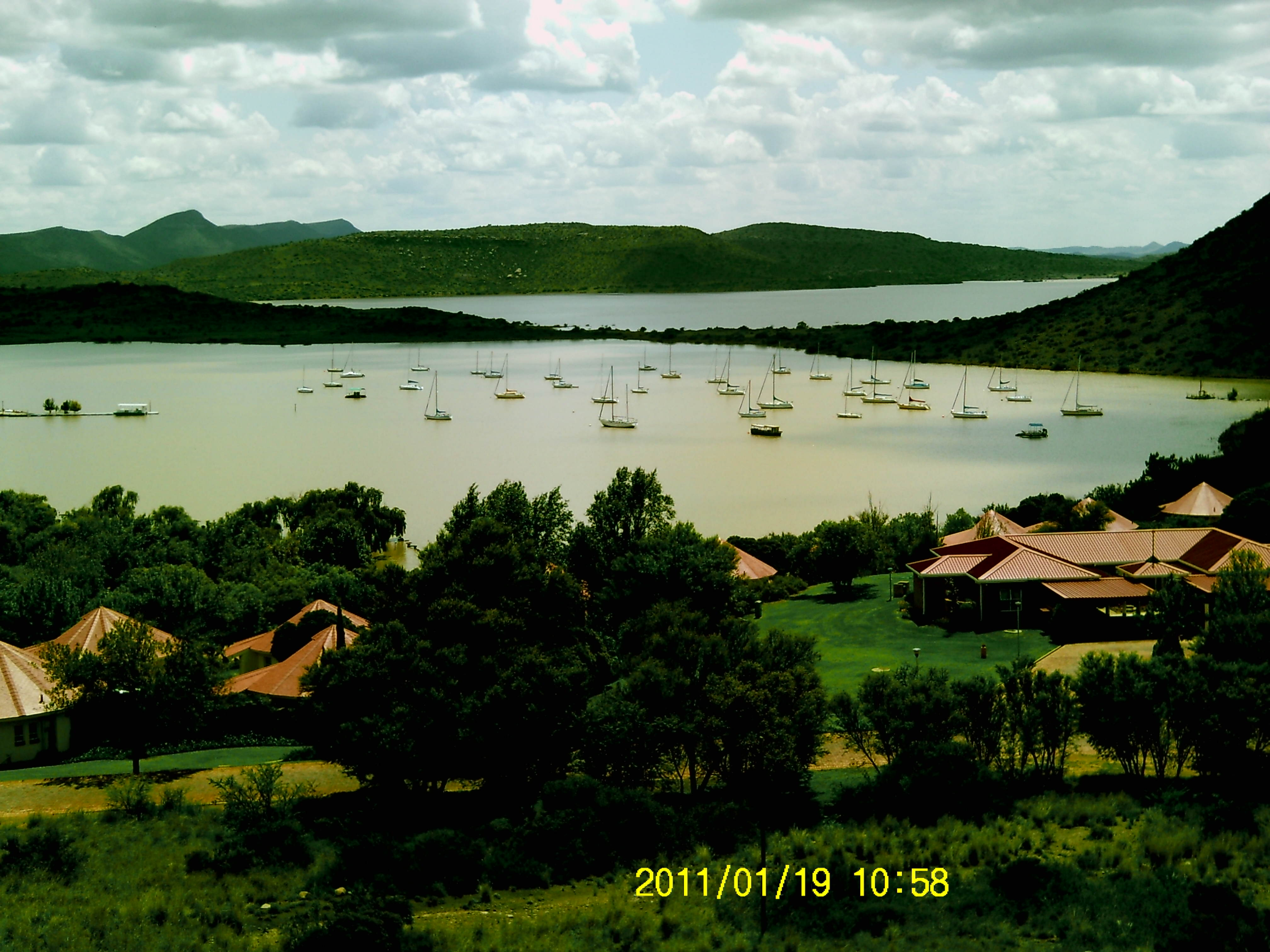
Forever Holiday Resort at Gariep Dam

== See also ==
- List of rivers of South Africa
- List of reservoirs and dams in South Africa
