= Orange–Fish River Tunnel =

Irrigation tunnel in South Africa

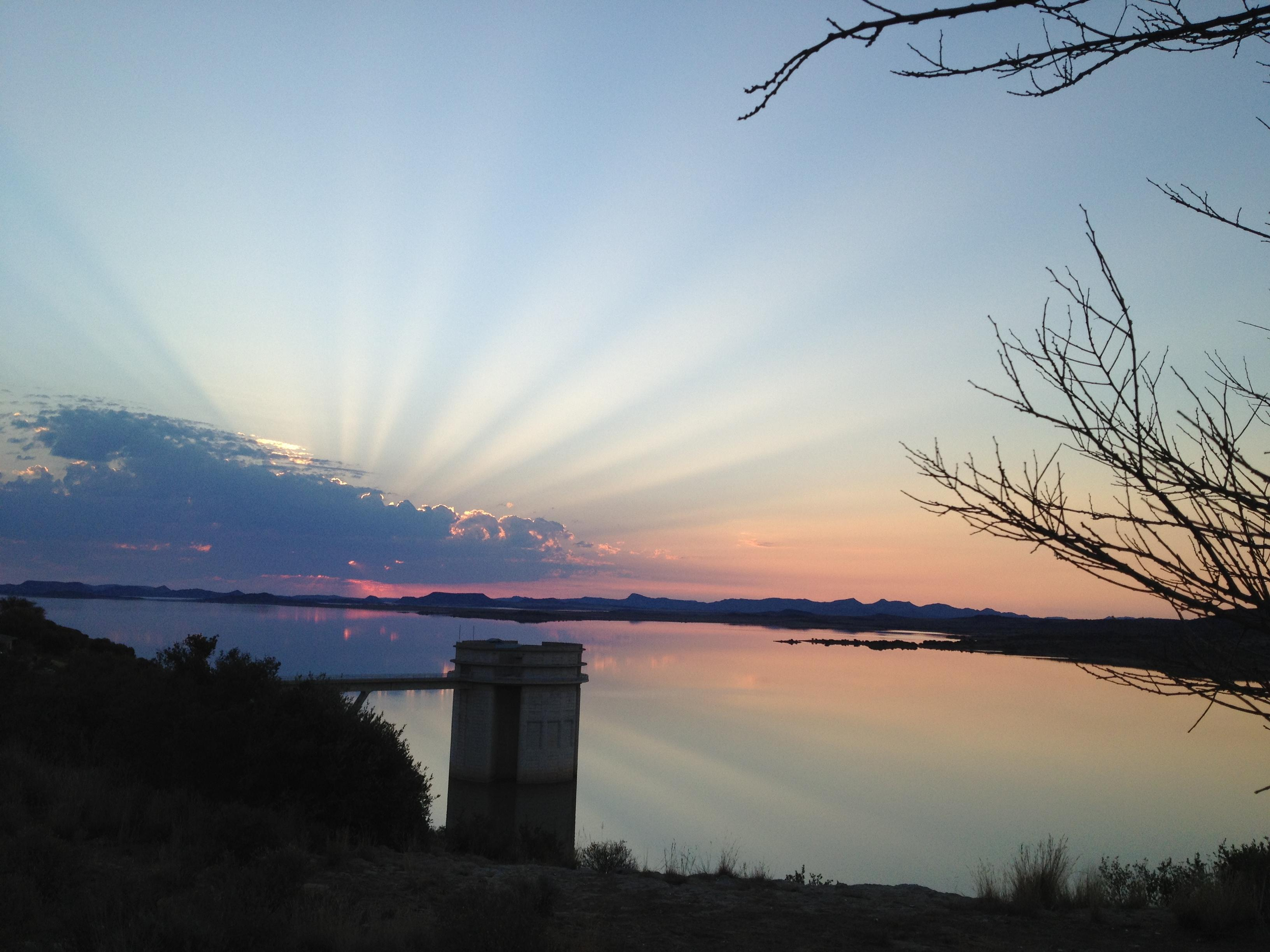
- Inlet tower of the Orange-Fish Tunnel at Oviston

Overview
- Coordinates: Gariep Dam: 30.690631°S 25.762746°E; Exit: 31.42299°S 25.63714°E
- Status: Active
- System: Orange-Fish Water Scheme
- Waterway: Orange River
- Start: Gariep Dam
- End: Teebus Spruit → Groot Brak River → Great Fish River

Operation
- Opened: Construction started: 1966; 60 years ago; Opened: 1976; 50 years ago
- Character: Water tunnel

Technical
- Length: 82.8 kilometres
- Tunnel clearance: 6 metre diameter

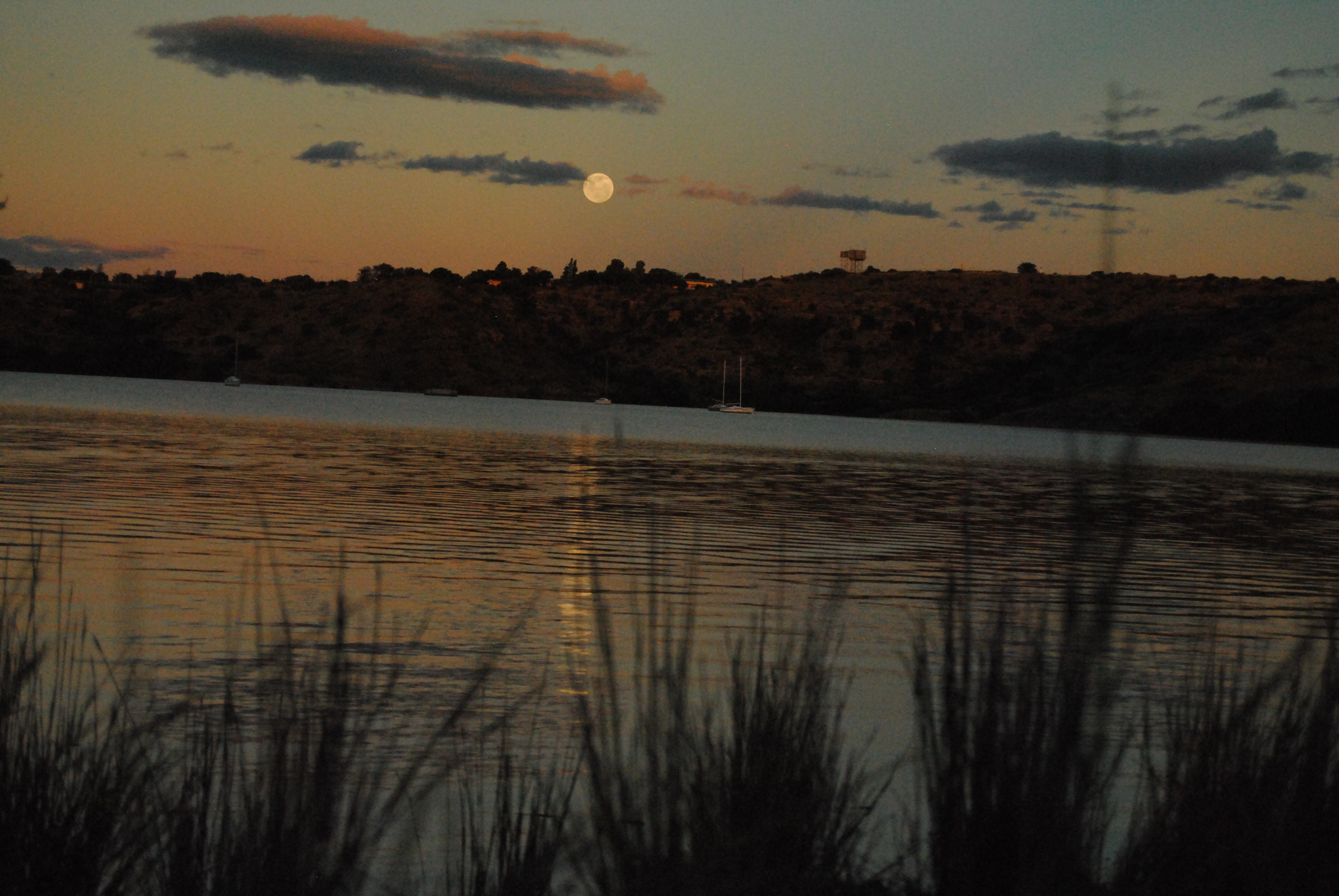
Sunset at Oviston, Gariep Dam

The Orange–Fish Tunnel, constructed between 1966 and 1975, is an 82.8-kilometre-long (51.4-mile) irrigation tunnel in central South Africa, built to divert water from the Orange River to the Fish River valley. It is the longest continuous enclosed aqueduct in the southern hemisphere.

== Purpose ==
For many years, large areas in the Eastern Cape experienced severe water shortages because of little rainfall in the arid Karoo. The situation was aggravated by the reduction in capacity of many of the existing dams due to heavy silt deposits.

The project to alleviate this situation comprised two interdependent engineering schemes, neither of which was of any use without the other: a dam had to be built across the Orange River, and a tunnel had to be driven to take the water across the watershed into a further river system. The Orange–Fish Tunnel, together with its network of canals, weirs, and balancing dams, has enabled these areas to be restored and has made the irrigation of thousands of hectares of additional land possible. The main purpose of the tunnel is to divert water from the Gariep Dam (when built it was called the Hendrik Verwoerd Dam (HV Dam for short), after the Prime Minister under whom the project was devised) to the Eastern Cape Karoo for irrigation, household, and industrial use.

== Route ==
The tunnel forms part of the Orange–Fish Water Scheme where it diverts water from the Orange River to the Great Fish River and the semi-arid areas of Eastern Cape province. The Orange River is the largest river in South Africa by volume, and the longest. It rises in the Drakensberg Mountains of Lesotho and flows westwards through increasingly drier country to discharge into the South Atlantic at Oranjemund, where, through evaporation and abstraction, the volume was far less than it was at the location of the Gariep Dam.

The inlet tower at 30°41′26″S 25°45′46″E takes water from the Gariep Dam at Oviston; the name Oviston is an acronym based on the Afrikaans Oranje-VISrivier TONnel. After traversing due south under the Suurberg mountain plateau, it releases the water to the Teebus Spruit (tunnel outlet at 31°25′22.5″S 25°38′14″E), to the Groot Brak River and onwards to the valleys of the Great Fish River and the Sundays River.

The tunnel is on what is called a "self-cleansing" gradient of 2% from north to south. During construction, South Africa changed over from Imperial measurement to the metric system, but special dispensation was made for this project to use Imperial measure throughout, which was half-built at the time.

== Preliminary works ==
Construction started in 1966; preliminary works included a tarred road running parallel to the route of the tunnel, and three towns, Oviston at the north end, one in the middle called "Mid-shaft", on the watershed plateau some 600 feet (180 m) higher than on either side, and "Teebus" at the South end. These towns included such facilities as a clubhouse, tennis courts, a community hall, primary school, clinic, etc. At Oviston there was also a power station to provide electricity to the tunnels and to the towns, and also an 80-kilometre (50 mi) transmission line. Other facilities included contractor's yards, a testing laboratory, and offices for the staff.

== Construction ==
The tunnel is 5.35 metres (17.6 ft) in finished diameter, with a 9-inch-thick (23 cm) mass concrete lining. The ground was excavated entirely by the drill-and-blast technique.

The lining was done using a travelling shutter: concrete arrived first thing Monday morning, and continued unstopped until Saturday afternoon. The concrete mix was developed specially for the project, and the cement content was 50% Slagment a.k.a. PFA (Pulverised Fuel Ash). The mix contained retarders to enable the concrete to be placed up to six hours after mixing, and it also contained accelerators, to enable the shutter to be moved after only eighteen hours. The speed of the shutter was about 1,000 feet (300 m) a week.

The tunnel ranges in depth below the surface between 80 metres (262 ft) and 380 metres (1,247 ft). It is on a gradient of 1:2000.

It was engineered by the British firm of Consulting Engineers, Sir William Halcrow & Partners, in association with Messrs Keeve Steyn and Partners of Johannesburg. The Client was the South African Department of Water Affairs. Halcrow's senior partner, Sir Alan Muir-Wood, sometimes known as "the father of modern tunnelling", worked on many of the world's leading tunnel projects, including the Orange-Fish Tunnel; the senior Engineer in charge of the design & supervision was Barry Kidd, who died young, before construction was completed.

The tunnel was opened in 1975. When completed, the tunnel's length of 83 km (52 mi) was the longest continuous enclosed aqueduct in the southern hemisphere and the second-longest water-supply tunnel in the world. Over 200000 m^{3} of concrete was used to line the tunnel, which has a maximum throughput of 54 m^{3}/s (1,900 cu ft/s).

Construction was not without incident, and was tested both by flood and by fire: the Inlet tunnel drive south of Shaft 2 intersected a water-bearing fissure that within 24 hours filled a mile of tunnel with water, and one of the Plateau drives intersected methane, which burned for three months.

The project was divided into three sections: Inlet, Plateau, and Outlet, each of about 27 kilometres (17 mi). In the Contract Documents it was anticipated that there could be one construction fatality for every mile of tunnel.

The tunnel was opened in 1976.

=== Inlet ===
The Contractor on the Inlet Section was Batignolles-Cogefar-African Batignolles, a consortium of French, Italian, and South African firms. There was an inlet drive and two inclined shafts. At each entry was a small alcove with a small statue of Saint Barbara, the Patron Saint of those who use explosives—tunnellers, miners, and artillerymen. By the time construction was complete, there had been 17 fatalities; all but one were related to railway operations rather than tunnelling.

=== Plateau ===
The mid-section had three deep vertical shafts. The contractors on the Plateau Section were Orange River Contractors (Orco), which was composed of firms from South Africa, France, and the United States. By the time construction was complete, there had been 34 fatalities.

=== Outlet ===
The Outlet section had two shafts and an outlet drive, to discharge the water into the existing Great Fish River watercourse. The Outlet Section was contracted to J. C. I. di Penta, a consortium that was formed by two firms—Johannesburg Consolidated Investment Company (JCI) from South Africa, and Impresa Ing. di Penta from Italy.

== Intake at Oviston ==
The intake tower is situated on the south bank of the Gariep Reservoir at Oviston, approximately 19 km (12 mi) upstream of the dam wall. Seen from above, the intake tower is shaped like a four-leaf clover with each leaf containing an inlet gate, all at different levels. In this manner, water can be drawn from different levels to help control the water quality. Each of the four inlets can be sealed off to allow complete de-watering of the tunnel for routine maintenance.
