= Joe Gqabi District Municipality =

Joe Gqabi
- District municipality
- Seal

- Location in the Eastern Cape
- Interactive map of Joe Gqabi District Municipality (2026)
- Coordinates: 30°58′S 27°36′E
- Country: South Africa
- Province: Eastern Cape
- Seat: Barkly East
- Local municipalities: List: Elundini; Senqu; Walter Sisulu

Government
  - Type: Municipal council
  - Mayor: NP Mposelwa

Area
  - Total: 25,663 km^{2} (9,909 sq mi)

Population (2011)
  - Total: 349,768
  - Density: 13.629/km^{2} (35.300/sq mi)

Racial makeup (2011)
  - Black African: 93.8%
  - Coloured: 3.5%
  - Indian/Asian: 0.2%
  - White: 2.4%

First languages (2011)
  - Xhosa: 70.5%
  - Sotho: 20.2%
  - Afrikaans: 5.9%
  - English: 1.6%
  - Other: 1.8%
- Time zone: UTC+2 (SAST)
- Municipal code: DC14

The Joe Gqabi District Municipality (Xhosa: uMasipala weSithili sase Joe Gqabi; Sotho: Masepala wa Setereke wa Joe Gqabi) is one of the seven districts of the Eastern Cape province of South Africa. The seat is Barkly East. As of 2011, the majority of its 349,768 inhabitants spoke isiXhosa.

Before 1 February 2010, it was known as the Ukhahlamba District Municipality; its name was changed in recognition of Joe Gqabi (1929–1981), an African National Congress member who was a journalist for the New Age, a member of the Umkhonto we Sizwe, and one of the Pretoria Twelve.

== Geography ==
=== Local municipalities ===
The district contains the following local municipalities:

Local municipality	Code	Population	%
Elundini	EC141	138 141	39.50%
Senqu	EC142	134 150	38.35%
Walter Sisulu	EC145	77 477	22.15%

=== Neighbours ===
Joe Gqabi is surrounded by the following districts:

== Demographics ==
The following statistics are from the 2011 census:

Language	Population	%
Xhosa	244 021	70.47%
Sotho	69 889	20.18%
Afrikaans	20 329	5.87%
English	5 696	1.64%
Sign language	2 124	0.61%
Other	1 319	0.38%
Zulu	875	0.25%
Ndebele	603	0.17%
Northern Sotho	592	0.17%
Tswana	471	0.14%
Tsonga	153	0.04%
Venda	141	0.04%
Swati	77	0.02%

=== Gender ===
Gender	Population	%
Female	184 325	52.70%
Male	165 443	47.30%

=== Ethnic group ===
Ethnic group	Population	%
Black African	328 002	93.78%
Coloured	12 177	3.48%
White	8 277	2.37%
Indian/Asian	632	0.18%

=== Age ===
Age	Population	%
000 - 004	35 279	10.34%
005 - 009	45 321	13.28%
010 - 014	51 410	15.06%
015 - 019	46 355	13.58%
020 - 024	28 543	8.36%
025 - 029	19 533	5.72%
030 - 034	16 274	4.77%
035 - 039	15 584	4.57%
040 - 044	14 915	4.37%
045 - 049	12 997	3.81%
050 - 054	11 073	3.24%
055 - 059	9 131	2.68%
060 - 064	9 828	2.88%
065 - 069	9 700	2.84%
070 - 074	6 694	1.96%
075 - 079	3 824	1.12%
080 - 084	3 312	0.97%
085 - 089	962	0.28%
090 - 094	402	0.12%
095 - 099	138	0.04%
100 plus	62	0.02%

== Politics ==
=== Election results ===
Election results for Joe Gqabi (prev. Ukhahlamba) in the South African general election, 2004.

- Population 18 and over: 180 079 [52.76% of total population]
- Total votes: 114 530 [33.55% of total population]
- Voting % estimate: 63.60% votes as a % of population 18 and over

Party	Votes	%
African National Congress	97 560	85.18%
United Democratic Movement	7 924	6.92%
Democratic Alliance	4 357	3.80%
Pan African Congress	1 344	1.17%
African Christian Democratic Party	732	0.64%
Independent Democrats	584	0.51%
New National Party	434	0.38%
Freedom Front Plus	429	0.37%
SOPA	156	0.14%
Inkhata Freedom Party	153	0.13%
Azanian People's Organisation	150	0.13%
EMSA	125	0.11%
PJC	116	0.10%
United Christian Democratic Party	116	0.10%
NA	84	0.07%
TOP	65	0.06%
UF	65	0.06%
CDP	44	0.04%
Minority Front	37	0.03%
NLP	28	0.02%
KISS	27	0.02%
Total	114 530	100.00%
