= R391 (South Africa) =

Regional route in South Africa

Regional route R391
- R391 route map

Route information
- Length: 96 km (60 mi)

Major junctions
- North end: R58 in Burgersdorp
- R56 near Molteno
- South end: R401 / R390 in Hofmeyr

Location
- Country: South Africa

Highway system
- Numbered routes of South Africa
← R390	→ R392

The R391 is a Regional Route in South Africa that connects Burgersdorp with Hofmeyr.

== Route ==
The R391 begins in the Burgersdorp town centre at a junction with the R58 route (Coligny Street; Van der Walt Street). It heads eastwards as Coligny Street for a few metres before turning south-south-west as Stasie Road to bypass the Mzanomhle township and meet the northern terminus of the R397 route after 5 kilometres. It continues south-south-west for another 32 kilometres to reach a junction with the R56 route approximately 25 kilometres north-west of Molteno and 30 kilometres east of Steynsburg. The R391 continues south-west for 58 kilometres, partially as the Groot-Doringhoek Pass, to reach its end at a junction with the R401 route in Hofmeyr, just east of the R401's intersection with the R390 route.

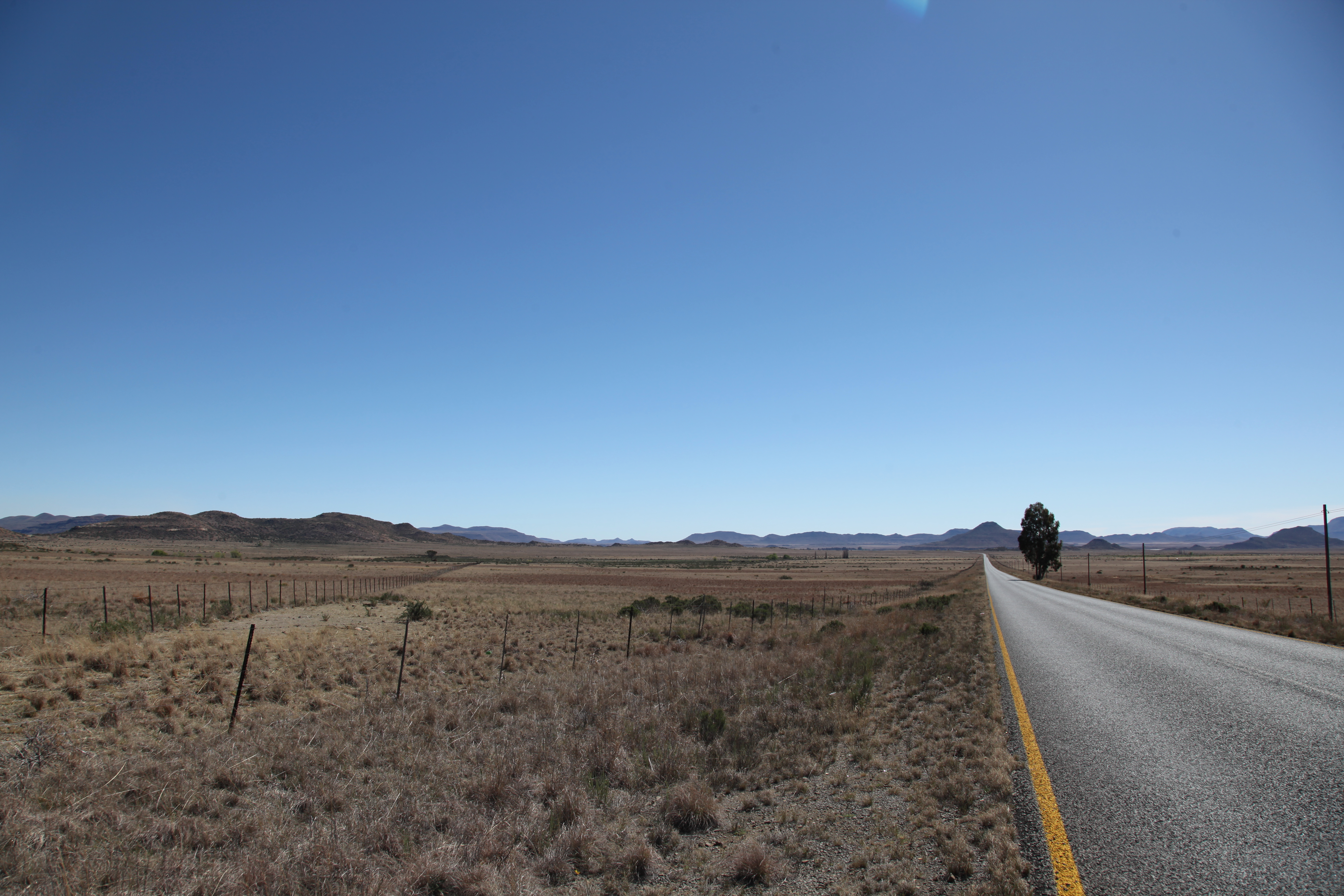
The R391 between the R56 and Burgersdorp
