= Dutch Reformed Church, Hofmeyr =

Church in Hofmeyr, South Africa

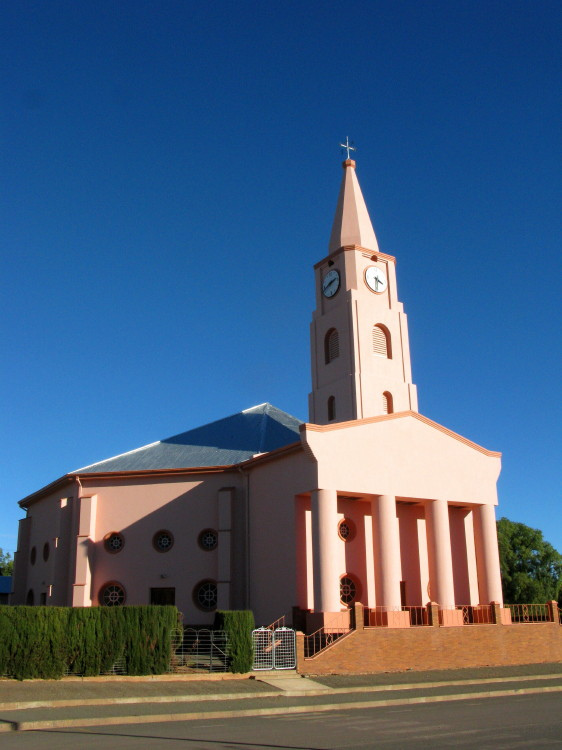
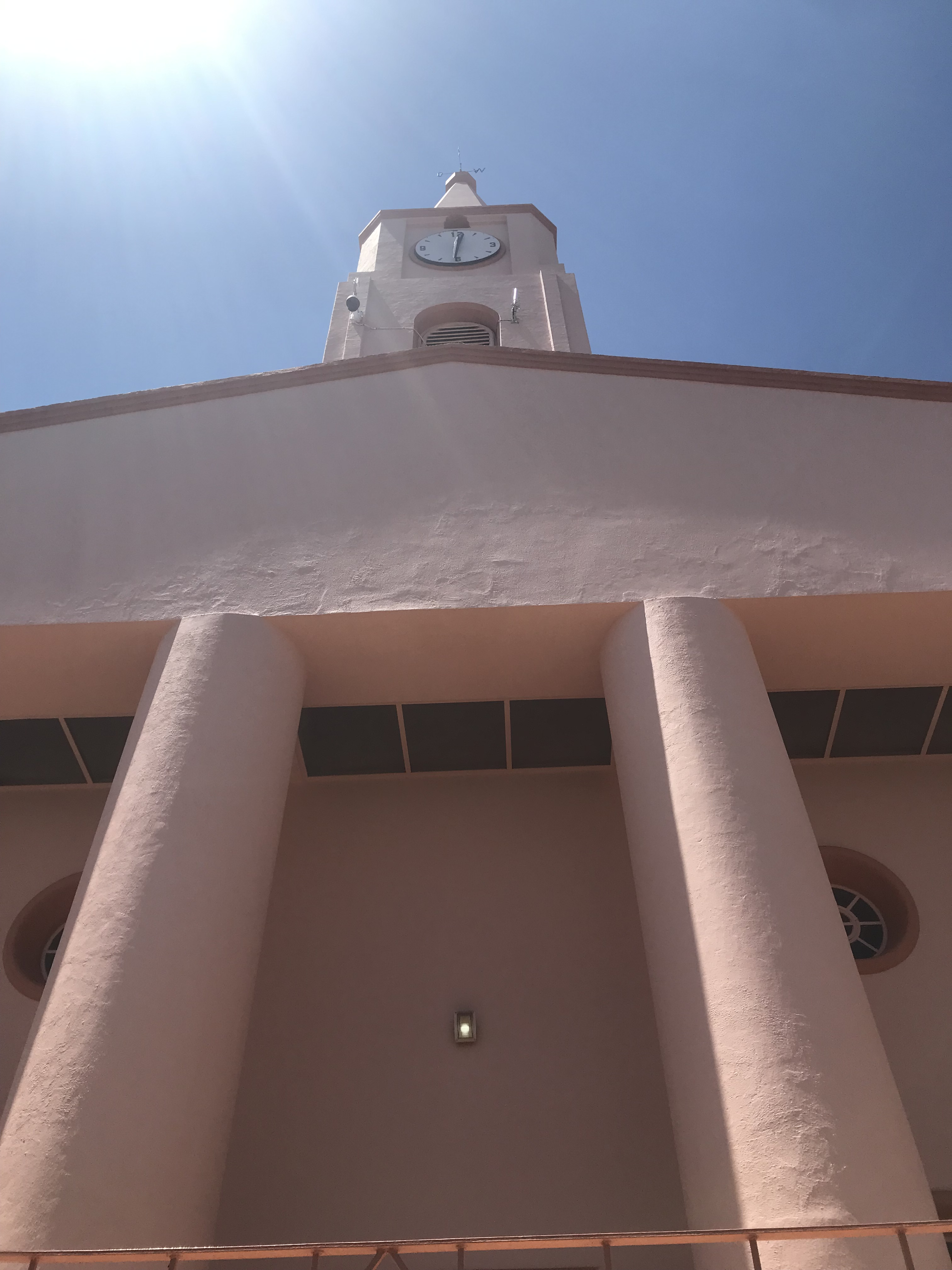
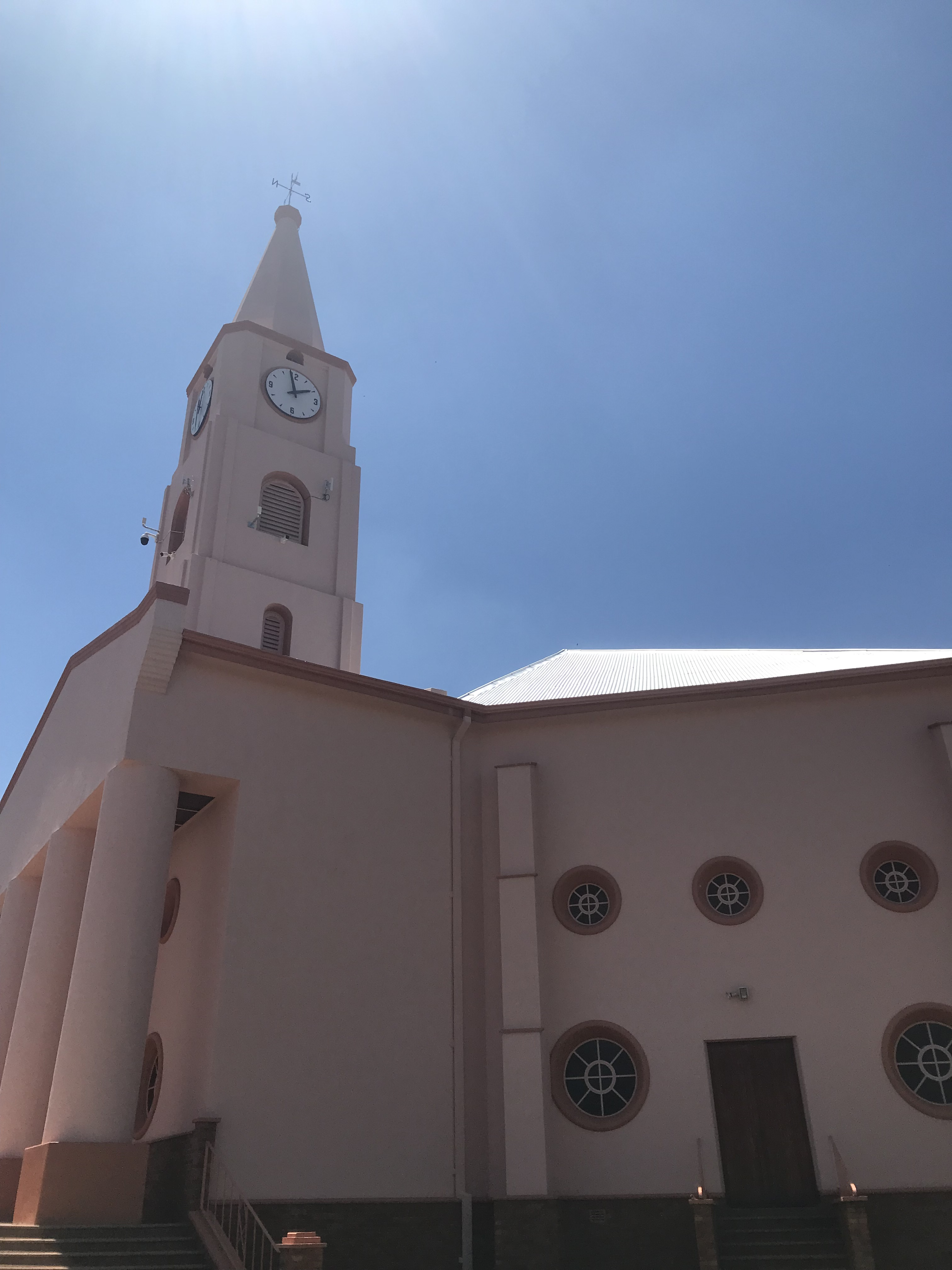
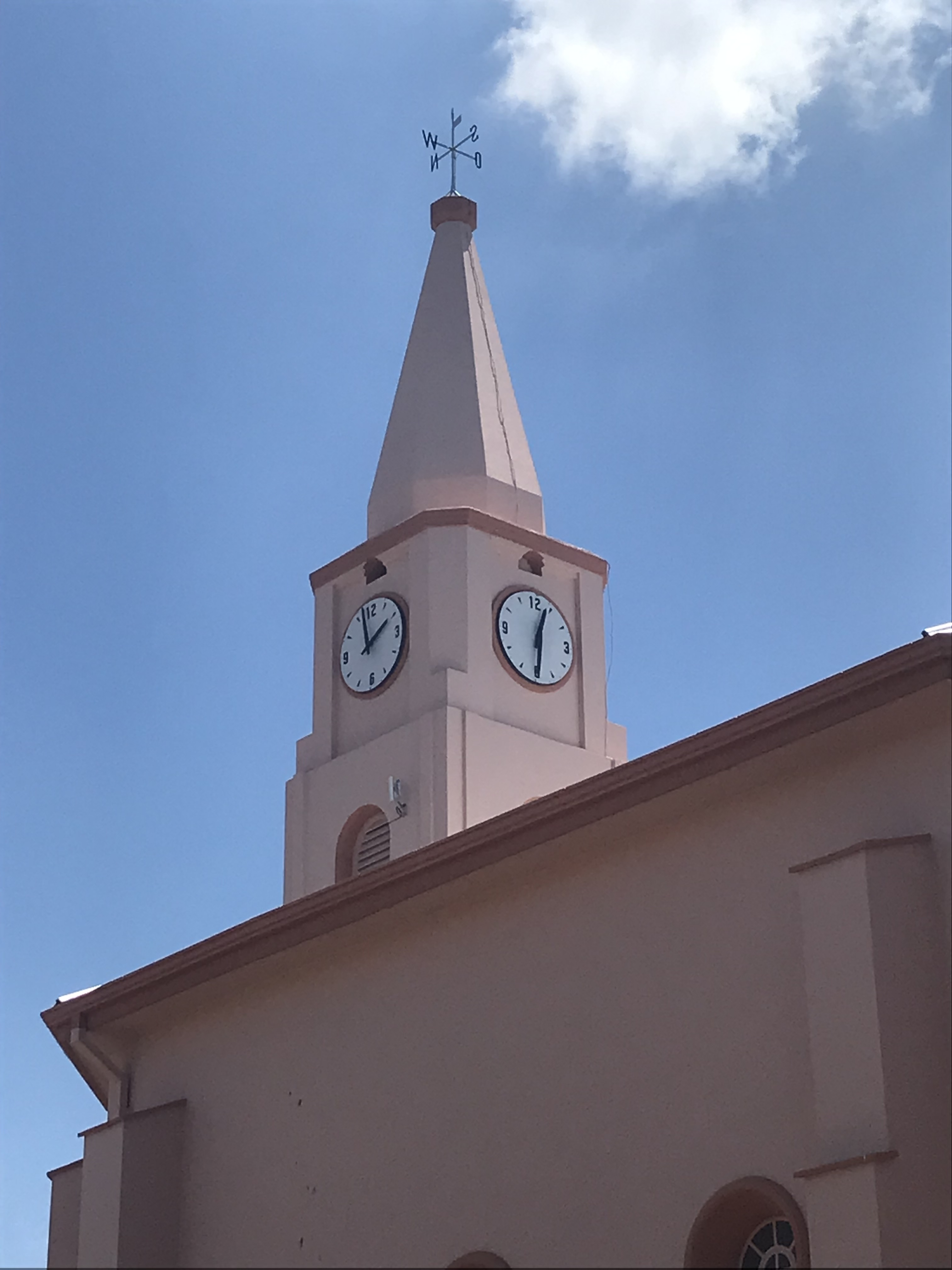
- =
- Interactive map of Dutch Reformed Church, Hofmeyr

The Dutch Reformed Church in Hofmeyr is a congregation of the Dutch Reformed Church in the north of the area of the NG Church in the Eastern Cape, which had only 138 professing members in 2012 and about 110 at the end of 2015. The center of gravity of the congregation is the town of Hofmeyr on the R390, located 65 km (40 mi) from Cradock and 46 km (29 mi) from Steynsburg. The church is painted in a coral pastel color, which some perceive as pink, due to a combination of factors including the presence of other buildings in pastel colors in the town at the time of its first painting, and an artist's advice to match the color of the local red lime scale and coral sunsets.

== Background ==
Around 1870, one Daniel Marais lived on a farm on the borders of the districts of Cradock and Albert (with Burgersdorp as its centre). These two towns are about 160 km (99 mi) apart. In carrying out his duties as deacon of the Dutch Reformed Church in Burgersdorp, he discovered that there were young people in his area between the ages of 14 and 16 who had never seen the inside of a church or school. He consequently decided that this situation could no longer continue and because the people could not be brought to the distant towns, he came to the conviction that the church and school had to be brought to the people. In order to bring the school and church to the people, part of the farm Droefontein was purchased from a farmer, Gert Hendrik Petrus de Bruin, and the town of Maraisburg was laid out on it in 1873.

== Ministers ==
- Johannes Hermanus Krige, 1878 - 1919 (his only congregation; retired; died on January 18 1931)
- B.F. van der Merwe, 1920 - 1946
- Samuel Murray, 1947 - 1950
- Andries Groenewald, 1951 - 1956
- Nathan Frans Wilson, 1959 - 1964
- Van der Merwe, Cornelis Gerhardus, 1964 - 1967
- Hennie Strydom, 1975 - 1980
- Everhardus van Nuholtz (Evard) Huisamen, 1981 - 1985, after which Lyttleton (1985), Radio Pulpit (1988), callable from 1992, retired from the ministry in 2000
- William Stefanus Egelhoff, 1988 - 1997 (resignation)
- Ferdinand Jacobus Johann Boll, 1998 (temporary), 1999 - 2001
- Quintin Nel, April 2016 – present
