= Frederick E. Grine =

American anthropologist

Frederick Edward Grine is an American paleoanthropologist. He is a professor of anthropology and anatomical sciences at the State University of New York at Stony Brook.

He received his bachelor's degree from Washington & Jefferson College in 1970, and his Ph.D. from the University of the Witwatersrand, South Africa in 1984.

His research focuses on the hominin fossil record, during the Pliocene and early Pleistocene and the reconstruction of phylogenetic relationships through dental morphology. Among his most important works, has been the analysis of dental microwear in order to reconstruct early hominin dietary habits. Together with his former graduate students, David Strait and Carrie Mongle, he has published influential studies of early hominin phylogenetic relationships.

Dr. Grine is a major proponent in the argument that species of robust australopithecine should be given their own genus name, Paranthropus. He also argues that the genus Australopithecus is paraphyletic which would require a new taxonomic designation for specimens included under Australopithecus afarensis to Praeanthropus africanus.

He is the editor of Evolutionary History of the Robust Australopithecines (Transaction Publishers, ISBN 0-202-36137-3) and co-editor of Primate Phylogeny (Academic Press, ISBN 0-12-303960-6) and "The First Humans: Origin and Early Evolution of the Genus Homo (Springer, ISBN 978-1-4020-9979-3)." He has also authored the widely used anatomical textbook, Regional Human Anatomy: a Laboratory Workbook for Use With Models And Prosections (McGraw-Hill College, ISBN 0-07-243888-6). In addition to this, Dr. Grine has published well over 200 peer-reviewed scientific research articles.

He is also known for his work in leading the team that dated the Hofmeyr Skull, discovered in 1952, near the town of Hofmeyr, in the Eastern Cape Province of South Africa, to 36,000 years before present. This skull probably represents the population ancestral to most modern living humans.
