= R402 road =

R402 road may refer to:

- R402 road (Ireland)
- R402 road (South Africa)
