= Dutch Reformed Church, Steynsburg =

Church in Steynsburg, South Africa

Dutch Reformed Church
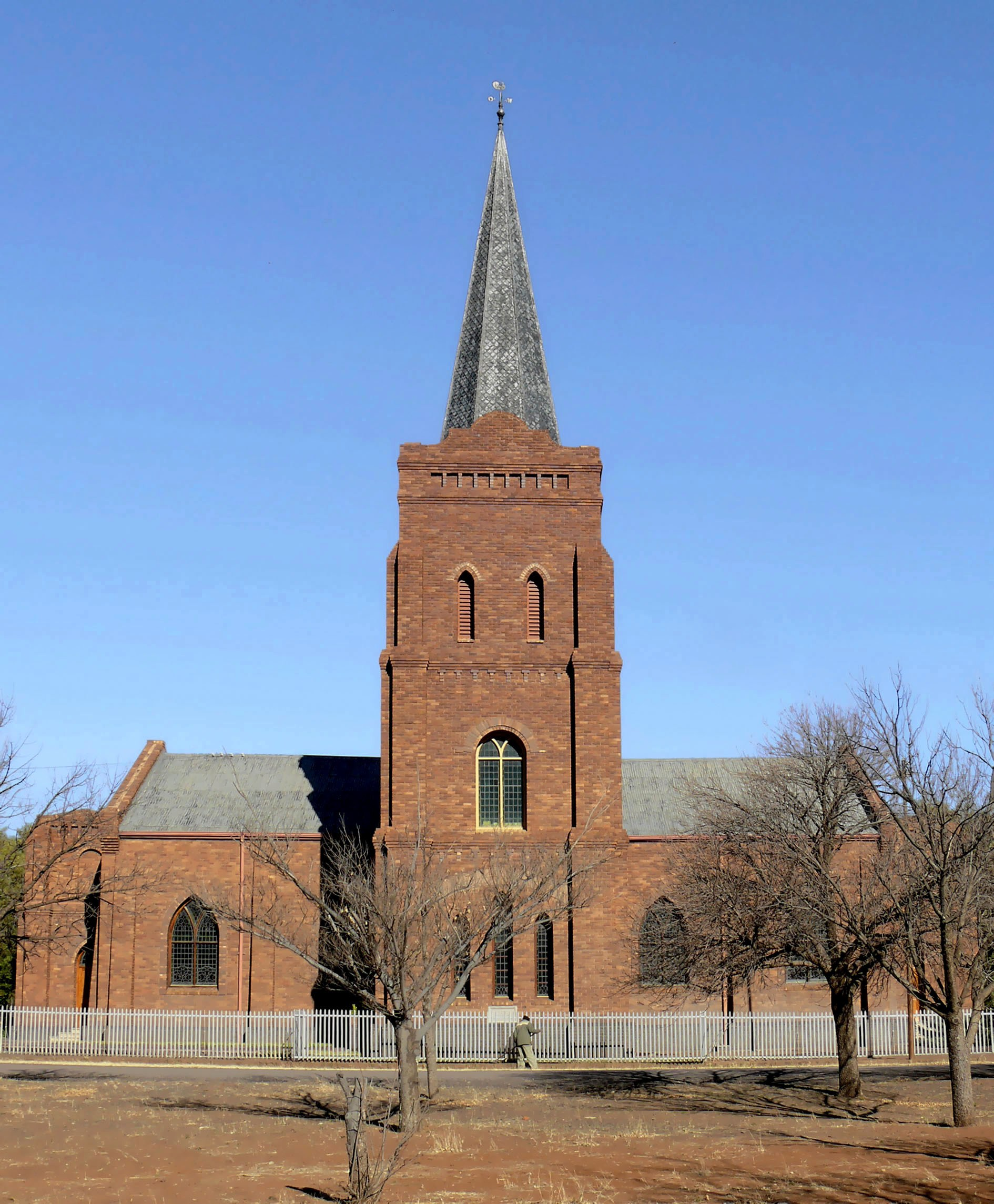
- Dutch Reformed Church
- 31.2976°S 25.8253°E
- Location: Steynsburg
- Country: South Africa
- Denomination: Nederduits Gereformeerde Kerk

History
- Founded: 1872

Architecture
- Functional status: Church

The Dutch Reformed Church in Steynsburg is one of the smaller congregations (180 members in 2012) of the Eastern Cape Synod of the Dutch Reformed Church. The congregation is bordered by the congregations of Burgersdorp, Molteno, Hofmeyr, Middelburg and Venterstad.

== Background and foundation ==
The town of Steynsburg was established in 1872 by the Reformed Church and was then located in the Albert district. The members of the Dutch Reformed Church in the area of Steynsburg were then affiliated with the Burgersdorp congregation. They strongly felt the need for their own congregation, especially because of the great distances (64 km to Burgersdorp). In 1874, construction of the first church building had already begun, the cornerstone of which was laid in March 1875. The congregation was founded on 26 January 1876, mainly through the zeal of Johannes C.M.D. du Plessis.

== Ministers ==
- Pieter Daniël Rossouw, 1878–1881
- Andries Adrian Louw Albertyn, 1882–1884 (after which Rouxville until his death on 3 May 1906)
- Dr. Johannes Petrus van Heerden, 1885–1887
- Willem Hendrik Boshoff, 1888–1906
- Stephanus Petrus Malherbe, 1907–1925 (emeritus; died on 20 September 1927)
- Izak Jacob Viljoen, 1925–1931
- Dr. Louis Viljoen Rex, 1932–1939
- Prof. dr. Frederik Johannes Mentz Potgieter, 1940–1943
- Johan Gregorius Bezuidenhoud, 1943–1947
- Dr. Willem Adriaan Smit, 1948–1953
- Pierre Johan de Vos, 1953–1959
- Sarel Jacobus Pieterse, 1960–1962
- Marthinus Adrianus Bergh, 1962–1965
- Barend Rudolph Buys, 1978 – 15 March 1981 (emeritus)

== Sources ==
- (in Afrikaans) Beyers, C.J. 1981. Suid-Afrikaanse Biografiese Woordeboek Deel IV. Durban en Pretoria: Butterworth & Kie (SA) (Edms.) Bpk. namens die Raad vir Geesteswetenskaplike Navorsing.
- (in Afrikaans) Olivier, ds. P.L. (samesteller), 1952. Ons gemeentelike feesalbum. Kaapstad en Pretoria: N.G. Kerk-uitgewers.
