= R390 road =

R390 road may refer to:

- R390 road (Ireland)
- R390 road (South Africa)
