= R401 (South Africa) =

Regional route in South Africa

Regional route R401

Route information
- Length: 134 km (83 mi)

Major junctions
- West end: R61 near Nieu-Bethesda
- N10 near Grassridge Dam; R391 / R390 in Hofmeyr
- East end: R61 near Tarkastad

Location
- Country: South Africa

Highway system
- Numbered routes of South Africa
← R400	→ R402

The R401 is a Regional Route in South Africa that connects Tarkastad with Bethesdaweg via Hofmeyr. It starts and ends at a junction with the R61.

== Route ==
The R401 begins at a junction with the R61 route approximately 17 kilometres north-west of Tarkastad. It heads north-west for 44 kilometres to pass through the town of Hofmeyr, where it meets the south-western terminus of the R391 route before meeting the R390 route. The R401 continues west for 54 kilometres, bypassing the Grassridge Dam, to meet the N10 national route at a junction before continuing for another 35 kilometres south-west to end at another junction with the R61 route (Wapadsberg Pass) approximately 60 kilometres east of Nieu-Bethesda and 60 kilometres north-west of Cradock.
