= R401 road =

R401 road may refer to:

- R401 road (Ireland)
- R401 road (South Africa)
