= R400 road =

R400 road may refer to:

- R400 road (Ireland)
- R400 road (South Africa)
