= Groot-Doringhoek Pass =

Mountain pass in South Africa

Coordinates: 31°22′46.1″S 26°04′24.9″E

Groot-Doringhoek Pass (English: Large Thorn Corner) is situated in the Eastern Cape, on the regional road R391 between Hofmeyr and Molteno.
