= Fish River Canoe Marathon =

Canoe marathon in South Africa

The Fish River Canoe Marathon is a two-day event taking place on the Fish River in the Eastern Cape Province of South Africa. It covers a total distance of 81.8 kilometres (50.8 mi), from Grassridge Dam southward to Cradock. The two other notable South African canoe marathons are the Dusi Canoe Marathon and the Berg River Canoe Marathon.

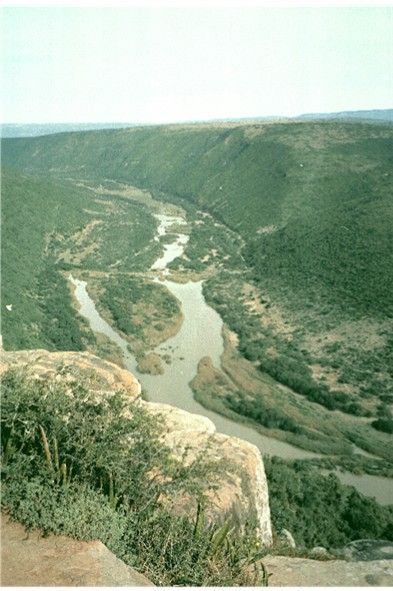

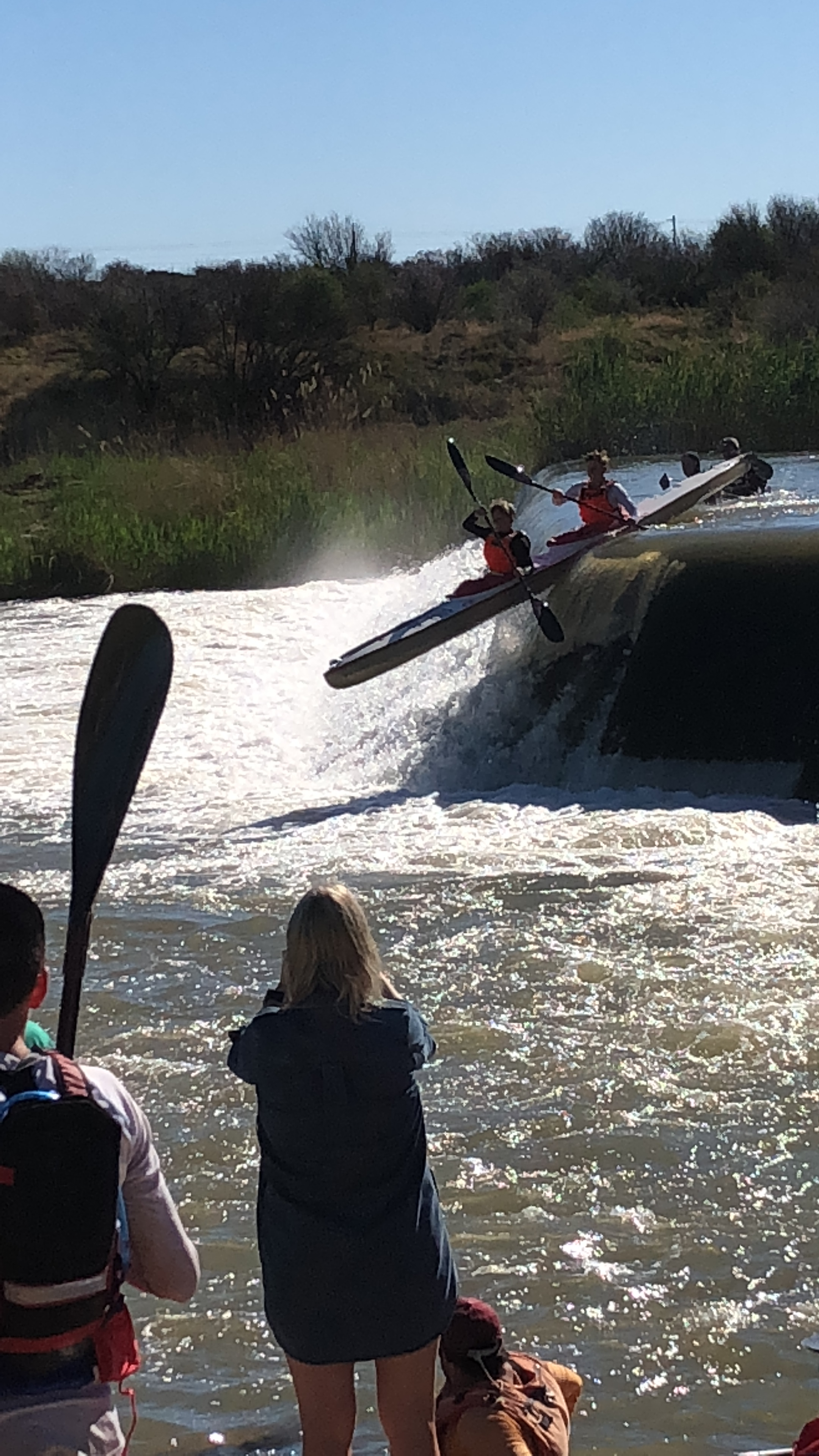
Cradock Weir on the Fish River Canoe Marathon

The Fish River marathon first took place in 1982 with 77 competitors. It was the brainchild of Cape paddler Dave Alexander and a local Department of Water Affairs engineer, Knut Olav "KO" Bang. By 2000 competitor numbers had grown to a record 1564, placing the race among the world's five biggest canoe marathons.

The K-3, developed in South Africa, is a recent addition to the sprint kayak class which previously consisted of the K1, K2 and K4. The K3 is particularly well suited to the Fish River with a relatively rock-free river bed and easily negotiable weirs. Demonstrating this in 2009, Matt Bouman, Herman Chalupsky and Andrew Birkett paddled their K3 to a 5h 9m finish, coming in just outside the top 10 overall.

The 2011 overall winners were Hank McGregor/Grant van der Walt with a time of 4:40.38 for the 2-day event.

== Winners ==
Year	Class	Winner	Time	Country
2011	K2	McGregor/ Van Der Walt	4:40:38	South Africa
2010	K2	McGregor/ Van Der Walt	4:43:26	South Africa
2009	K1S	Len Jenkins	4:51:16	South Africa
2008	K2	Lucas Mthalane	5:55:59	South Africa
2007	K1	Len Jenkins	4:57:39	South Africa
2006	K1	Scott Johnson	5:43:15	South Africa
2005	K1	Len Jenkins	4:59:27	South Africa
2004	K1	Maynard Scott	5:27:34	South Africa
2003	K1	Len Jenkins	5:04:31	South Africa
2002	K2	Willis Russell	5:17:28	South Africa
2001	K1	Len Jenkins	5:00:22	South Africa
2000	K1	Eben Mocke	5:47:03	South Africa
