= Hofmeyr Skull =

Hominin fossil

Coordinates: 31°34′S 25°58′E

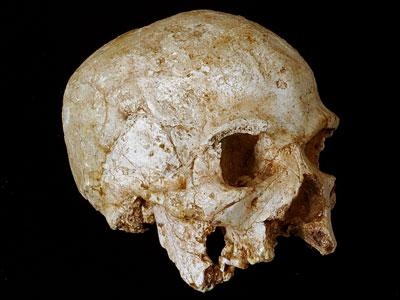
- Common name: Hofmeyr Skull
- Species: Human
- Age: c. 36,000 years ago
- Place discovered: Eastern Cape, South Africa
- Date discovered: 1952

Locations of the Hofmeyr skull find site in South Africa

The Hofmeyr Skull is a specimen of a 36,000-year-old anatomically modern human skull that was found in 1952 near Hofmeyr, South Africa.

== Background ==
The skull was found in 1952 on the surface of an erosion gully, a dry channel bed of the Vlekpoort River, near Hofmeyr, a small town in Eastern Cape, South Africa. No other bones or archaeological artifacts were found in the vicinity at the time of the skull's discovery. The skull is one of only a few African specimens of early modern humans dated over 30,000 years in age. Others are much more recent, dated to around 20,000 years ago.

In the 1990s, Alan Morris of the University of Cape Town noticed the skull in the Port Elizabeth Museum. He later showed it to Frederick Grine, an anthropologist and anatomist at State University of New York at Stony Brook. Grine then led a detailed study of the skull.

== Examination ==
It was not possible to date the skull using traditional radiocarbon dating, as the carbon had leached out of the bone. Instead, a new method involving a combination of optically stimulated luminescence and uranium-series dating methods was used. The method was developed by Richard Bailey of Oxford University. The earth material from the skull "filling the endocranial cavity" (central portion of the endocranial cavity) was dated using a combination of optically stimulated luminescence and uranium-series dating methods, coupled through a radiation-field model. Based on the assumption that the earth in the skull is about the age of its inhumation and thus the same as the age of the skull, age was estimated to 36,200 ± 3,200 years old.

The dating also assumed that the skull "had neither been uncovered long before nor transported any substantial distance before its discovery". The material in the skull can not have been washed out or replaced by water flowing down the gully because "the force required to scour the inner-most sediments would certainly have resulted in substantial damage" of the skull, and the skull did not appear to the dating team to have been damaged that much.

The anterior part of the lower facial skeleton has been damaged. The angle of the mandible, the mastoid process of the right temporal, and much of the occipital are not present. The coronal suture is obliterated and the third molars are heavily worn, suggesting that the specimen reached adulthood. The skull's owner had been wounded over his left eye and the wound had partially healed before death. The most severe damage to the skull, however, was caused during its time in storage and "mishandling" after its 1950 discovery. A lost bone is documented on pictures from 1968 and 1998.

== Analysis ==
The Hofmeyr Skull has been dated to around 36,000 years ago. Osteological analysis of the cranium by the Max Planck Institute for Evolutionary Anthropology indicates that the specimen is morphologically distinct from recent groups in Subequatorial Africa, including the local Khoisan populations. The Hofmeyr fossil instead has a very close affinity with other Upper Paleolithic skulls from Europe. Some scientists have interpreted this relationship as being consistent with the Out-of-Africa theory, which hypothesizes that at least some Upper Paleolithic human groups in Africa and Eurasia should morphologically resemble each other. A piece of parietal bone (surgically removed) will be sent to Professor Eske Willerslev in Copenhagen for ancient DNA analysis.

== See also ==
- Asselar man
- List of fossil sites (with link directory)
- List of hominina (hominid) fossils (with images)
