= Grassridge Dam =

- Interactive map of Grassridge Dam
- Official name: Grassridge Dam
- Country: South Africa
- Location: Hofmeyr, Eastern Cape
- Coordinates: 31°45′30″S 25°28′1″E
- Purpose: Irrigation
- Construction began: 1923
- Opening date: 1924 (renovated 1948)
- Owner: Department of Water Affairs

Dam and spillways
- Type of dam: Earth fill dam
- Impounds: Great Brak River
- Height: 30 m
- Length: 594 m

Reservoir
- Creates: Grassridge Dam Reservoir
- Total capacity: 46 200 000 m³
- Surface area: 1384 ha

The Grassridge Dam is an earth-fill type dam located on a tributary of the Great Fish River called the Great Brak River, near Hofmeyr, Eastern Cape, South Africa. It is the starting point for the Fish River Canoe Marathon, which ends in Cradock. The Dam was constructed in 1923 (commissioned in 1924) and was renovated in 1948. Its main purpose is for irrigation use and the hazard potential has been ranked high (3).

== See also ==
- List of reservoirs and dams in South Africa
- List of rivers of South Africa
