= Steynsburg Reformed Church (GKSA) =

Church in Steynsburg, South Africa

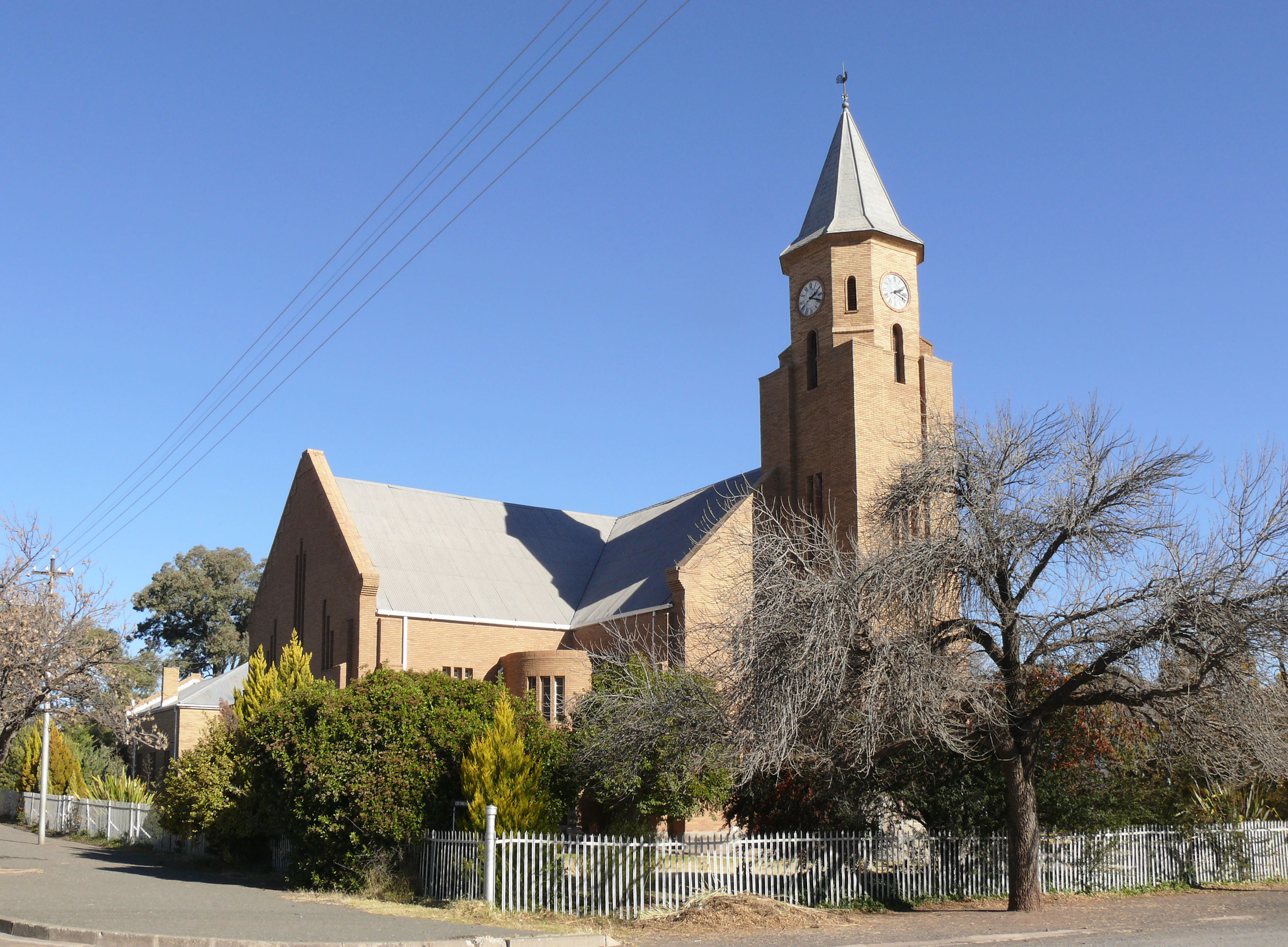

The Steynsburg Reformed Church is the oldest congregation of the Reformed Churches in South Africa in the North Eastern Cape town of Steynsburg, which was founded by the church council and after elder A.P.J. Steyn was named because he took the lead in founding the congregation. Because of the congregation's zeal for education, it took an important place in the Reformed church association, especially during the first almost 80 years of its existence until around 1950. A school with 100 learners was opened here in 1875 and in 1905 a school for Christian national education (a counter to the state's anglicization policy) from which a teaching college developed.

== Background ==
In the vicinity of the present Karoo town Steynsburg, a number of members of the Reformed Church lived in Middleburg and Burgersdorp. The distance to their hometown was great and with a view to faithful ecclesiastical coexistence, the need for their own hometown and church place became stronger. Elder A.P.J. Steyn van Middelburg, a brother of pres. Paul Kruger's mother was the soul of the enterprise. He was undoubtedly a man of exceptional ability and great influence. Rev. YES. van Rooy describes him in his later memories as "a venerable figure, his countenance and entire physique show that he is an uncle of President Kruger."

It is clear that the people of the area consulted with each other beforehand. An organization of its own began to take shape when a commission of two persons, the aforementioned A.P.J. Steyn and L.S. van der Walt, be assigned to buy land with a view to establishing a new town and a congregation. The farm Grootvlei was purchased from two owners. The village land approximately south of the current railway line was purchased from Andries van der Walt. The part mainly north of the railway was bought from L.P. Vorster, grandfather of the later Rev. LP Frost. The land for a village plant is ready. However, the beginning of a town is closely linked to the establishment of a new congregation. There is no reasoning about where exactly the site and task of the civilians is and where that of the church. There is no falling over all sorts of tidbits of procedures. No wonder that on 16 August 1872 elder Steyn did not request the church council of Middelburg to nominate a commission to establish a new congregation, but to determine the boundary of the new town. The church council agrees and nominates the pastor Rev. M.P.A. Coetzee sr., elder N. van der Walt and deacons J.H. van der Walt and J.J.A. Coetzee.

== Ministers ==
- Maarten Petrus Albertus Coetsee jr., 1874–1883
- Prof. Jan Lion Cachet, 1883–1894
- Dirk Postma jr., 1894 – 7 June 1897
- Maarten Pelser, 1897 – 7 June 1902 (died in office)
- Dr. P.C. Snyman, 1902 – 9 May 1915 (died in office)
- Dr. Casparus J.H. de Wet, 1917–1923
- Douw Venter, 1924–1947 (23 years, the second longest tenure of the congregation's ministers)
- Vorster, Johannes Lodewikus, 1948 to 1953
- Louis Jacobus Botha, 1954–1956
- Alwyn Johannes du Plessis, 1958–1961
- Paul Jacobus Opperman, 1962–1967
- Hessel Dijkstra, 1967–1971
- Jan Hendrik Coetzee, 1972–1975
- Dr. Johannes Peter Bingle, 1976–1979
- Johann le Roux, 1980–1983
- Dirk Hendrik Petrus Wijnbeek, 1983–2012 (29 years, the longest that any minister has served the congregation)
