= Steynsburg Provincial Hospital =

- Eastern Cape Department of Health

Geography
- Location: Steynsburg, Eastern Cape, South Africa
- Coordinates: 31°17′35″S 25°48′43″E

Organisation
- Care system: Public
- Type: Community

Services
- Emergency department: Yes
- Beds: 29

Links
- Website: Eastern Cape Department of Health website - Joe Gqabi District Hospitals
- Other links: List of hospitals in South Africa

Steynsburg Hospital is a Provincial government funded hospital for the Joe Gqabi District Municipality area in Steynsburg, Eastern Cape in South Africa.

The hospital departments include Emergency department, Maternity ward, Out Patients Department, Surgical Services, Medical Services, Pharmacy, Anti-Retroviral (ARV) treatment for HIV/AIDS, Oral Health Care Provides, Physiotherapy, Laundry Services, Kitchen Services and Mortuary.
