= Jan Lion Cachet =

South African writer (1838–1912)

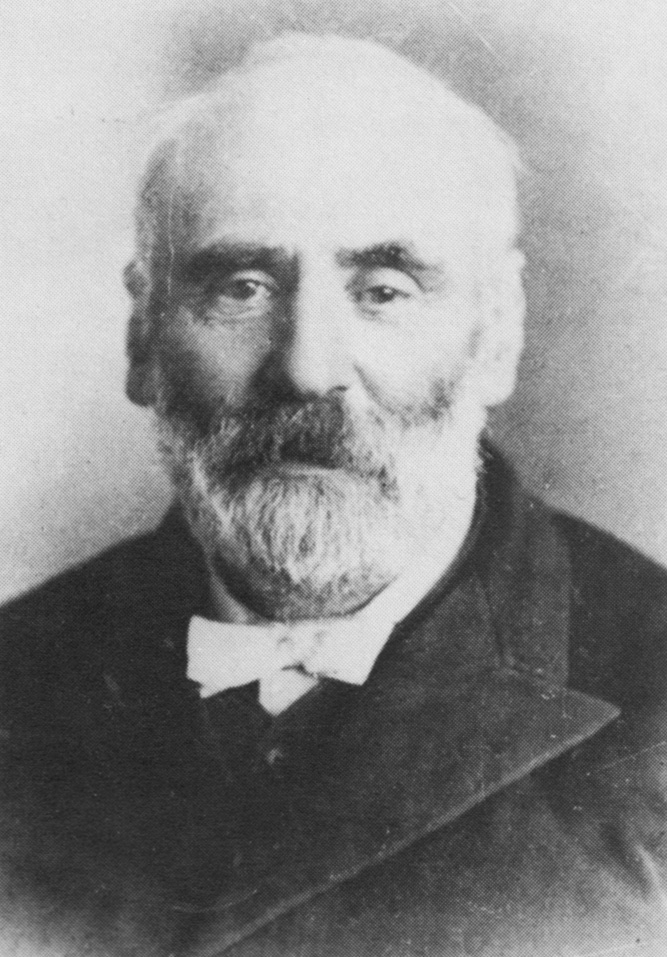
- Born: 29 November 1838 Amsterdam, Netherlands
- Died: September 21, 1912 (aged 74) Potchefstroom, South Africa
- Occupation: Minister; writer; poet
- Language: English; Afrikaans
- Years active: 1857–1911

Jan Lion Cachet (29 November 1838 – 21 September 1912) was a minister and professor in the Reformed Church and an early Afrikaans writer and poet. Cachet was born to Jewish-Portuguese parents as the younger brother of Frans Lion Cachet. In 1849 the family converted to Christianity. In 1861 Cachet emigrated to South Africa as a teacher. He qualified as a minister and later became a professor at the Theological School in Burgersdorp, of which Prof. Dirk Postma was the rector. In 1905 he moved with the theological school to Potchefstroom and a few years later he died.

Dr. B. Spoelstra describes Cachet in the South African Biographical Dictionary as a preacher of the gospel; he was called by the State President Paul Kruger, also a member of the Reformed Church, to lead a prayer meeting in Pretoria on 27 August 1899 with a view to the impending war. As a professor, he helped train ministers for service to church and people, instead of theologians. Spoelstra also described him as identifying as Jewish, Dutch, and Afrikaner, and as active in church, political, educational, and cultural fields.

In February 1909, he received the Officer's Cross of the Order of Orange-Nassau from Queen Wilhelmina of the Netherlands. He is particularly remembered for his poem, "Di Afrikaans Taal", which appeared in Ons Klyntji in 1896, and later in his prose work Sewe duiwels en wad hulle dogen het.

== Early life ==
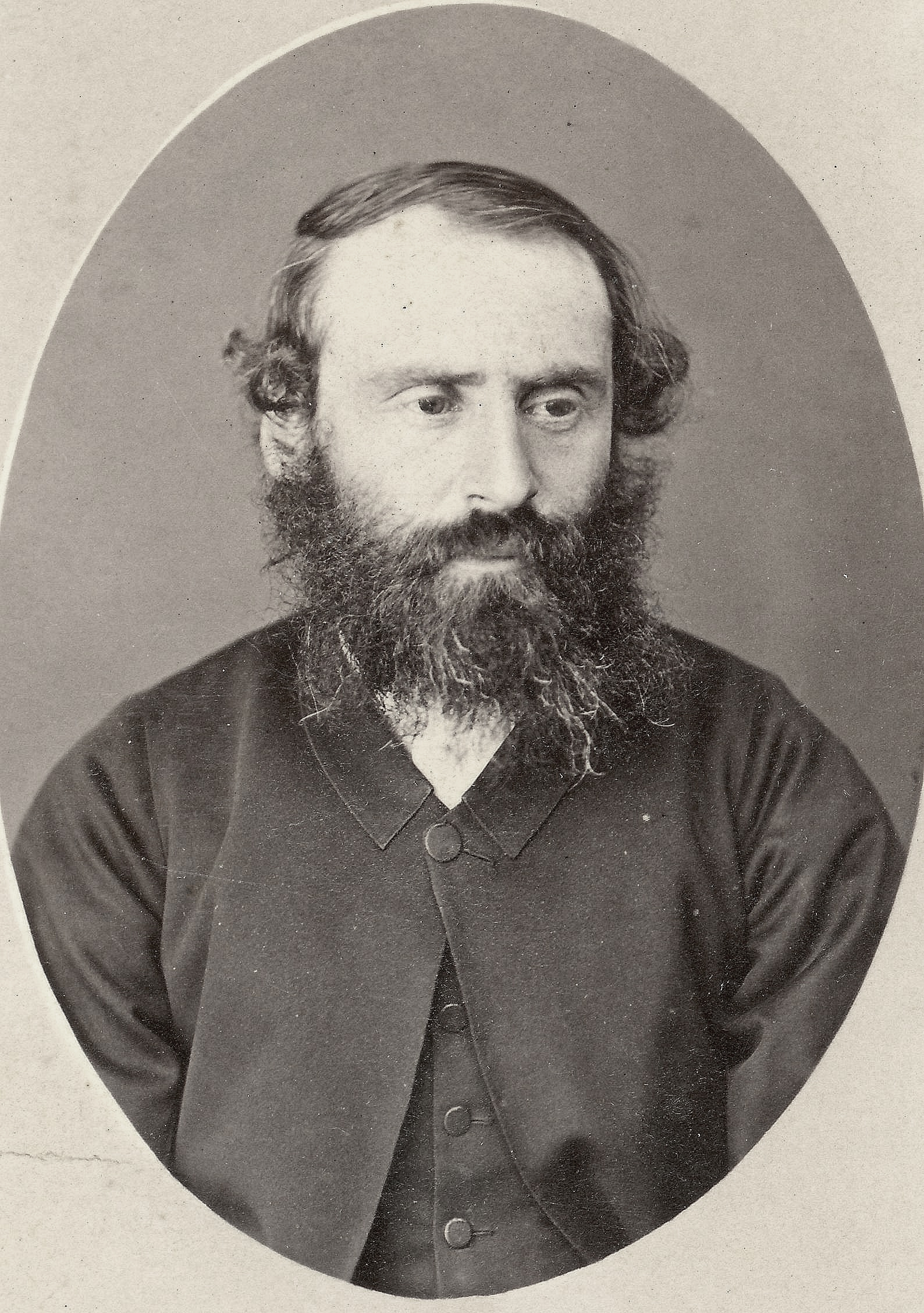
Cachet in his younger years

Jan Lion Cachet was born on 29 November 1838 at Krom Boomssloot 3, Amsterdam, one of five children and the third son. In 1849, the entire family, like the Dutch poet Isaac da Costa, converted to Christianity under the influence of the Dutch Réveil movement and were baptized on 30 September 1849 in the Noorderkerk in Amsterdam. Jan attended Isaac da Costa's school and then received missionary training at the seminary of the Free Scottish Church in Amsterdam. He qualified as a religious teacher in 1857 and taught in the Havenlooze school in Amsterdam until 1860.

== To South Africa ==
Cachet came to South Africa in January 1861 in response to a call by Dr. William Robertson for teachers and catechists from Europe for the Dutch Reformed Church. His eldest brother and study partner, Frans Lion Cachet, was already working in South Africa at that time. He taught for about two months in the Cape at the school Tot Nut van het Algemeen and then until March 1862 at a small church school (the Dutch Reformed Seminary) in Breëstraat. However, the Cape was at this time largely under the influence of the liberal movement in the church, where he felt at home. So in April 1862 he went to Ladysmith in Natal and taught at a farm school here and then private teaching in the district. On his own he studied various languages and thus became fluent in French, German and English. In Ladysmith he transferred from the Dutch Reformed Church to the Reformed Church and decided in 1865 to qualify as a minister. After private study under the Rev. Dirk Postma (then still minister of Rustenburg) was allowed to be confirmed as minister of the Reformed Church in Rustenburg on 27 July 1868.

== To the Reformed Church ==
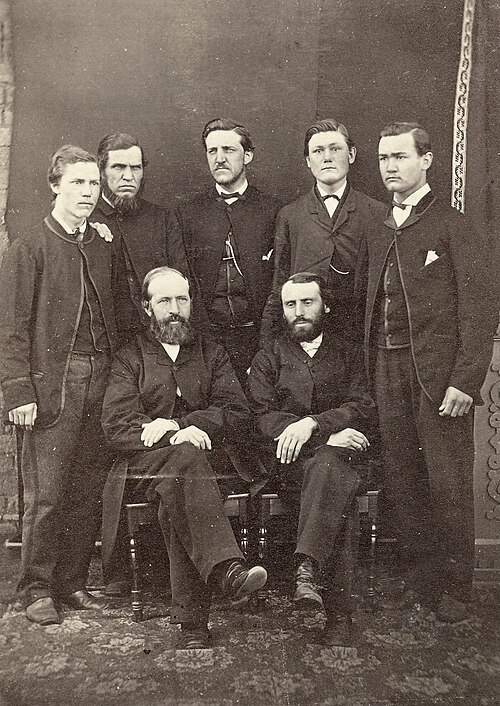
Dirk Postma and J.L. Cachet with the first five seminarians, M. Pelser, S.Venter, L.J. du Plessis, M.P.A Cotsee Jr., and W.J. Snyman.

In 1869 he was appointed minister of Burgersdorp and served here until the end of 1874. During this time, he became a lecturer at the newly founded Burgersdorp Theological School, which began with five students in 1869. In 1873 he started De Maandebode as an unofficial newspaper of the church, a predecessor of the Church's official organ, Die Kerkblad. His regular contributions, especially aimed at children, appeared in this. After this, he served as minister of Philipstown (1875–1883) and Steynsburg (1883–1891). While in the Cape Colony, he also exerted his influence in the political sphere and was, among other things, a co-founder of the Afrikanerbond and contributed to the drafting of the constitution of this union. He was repeatedly asked to stand for election to the Cape Parliament, but refused because he did not want to submit to the British government. He was a fervent advocate of an Afrikaans translation of the Bible and had been instrumental in its planning since 1886. At his suggestion, the State Bible was taken as the basis.

After the death of Postma in 1890, he returned to Burgersdorp as acting professor of Theology until he received his permanent appointment as professor of the Reformed Synod of Reddersburg in 1894. At the Theological School, Totius was one of his students. As the only professor, it was his task to cover the entire field of theology and to teach in all subjects. During this time, he also edited the newspaper De Stem op die dorp. At the first Afrikaans Language Congress held in Paarl on 15 and 16 January 1896, he delivered a lecture on the nature of Afrikaans. Here he also provided valuable input on the translation of the Bible, the establishment of his own magazine (Ons Klyntji) and his own dictionary. According to the first edition of Ons Klyntji in March 1896, the name of this magazine was suggested by him.

The esteem in which his ministry was held is reflected, among other things, in the fact that President Kruger specially invited him to lead a prayer service in Pretoria on 27 August 1899 about the impending war with England. During the Second Boer War, he was arrested in 1901 for high treason and imprisoned in Burgersdorp because he would support the rebellion and make unauthorized contact with the Transvaalers. The reality was that he considered himself called to preach the Word to remote Boer commandos. Well-meaning Englishmen then petitioned for his release and due to a lack of evidence against him, he was released after six weeks. During the war, the continued existence of the Theological School was constantly in the balance. In addition to his own arrest, two curators were also arrested for high treason. His own son Calman Efraim (also a former student of his), three students, including Japie Maré, and another former student died in the Three Years' War. After Calman's death in 1901 at Poortjie near Steynsburg, Cachet wrote the touching poem Leg hem neder naast zijn moeder.

The Theological School was moved to Potchefstroom in 1905, mainly through Totius's efforts, and he and his family then moved to this town, where he was succeeded as professor by Totius in May 1911. Although he was repeatedly invited to stand for election to parliament during this time, he refused to serve in this office under the British crown. However, he made important contributions in the field of education, where he was a strong advocate of Christian-national education and attacked the Smuts Act of 1907 in this regard with his writing Niet om te twisten, maar om wecetens wil. In 1909 he was a founding member of the Suid-Afrikaanse Akademie vir Wetenskap en Kuns in Bloemfontein.

== The Dorsland Trek ==
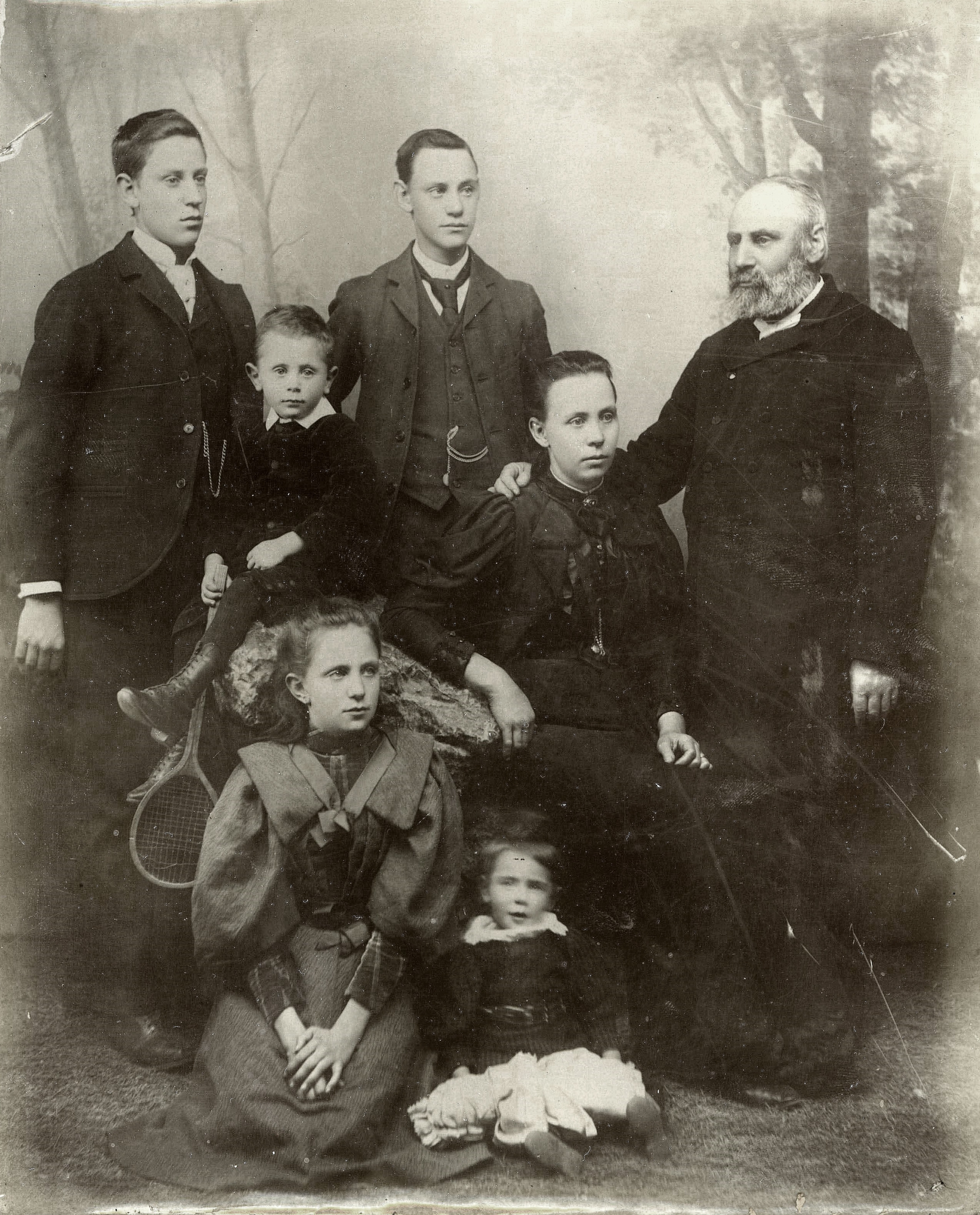
Prof. Cachet and his third wife, Marthie Viljoen, and the children from his second and third marriages. Back: Calman and Petrus. Middle: Francois Nicolaas. Front: Anna Mirjam (married to Van der Walt) and Rachel Aletta (married to Van Rooy).

The Dorslandtrekkers to South West Africa and Angola, with whom he shared the aversion to the modernist president T.F. Burgers of the South African Republic, appealed to him in 1877 for the "trekende gemeente der Gereformeerde Kerk van Zuid-Afrika". He resigned, but tried in vain while he was still a minister in Philipstown, to reach the trekkers in the Kaokoveld in South West Africa on behalf of a Cape relief committee led by Jan Hendrik Hofmeyr and Rev. Willem Petrus de Villiers and others (1879–80). He succeeded in a second attempt (1881), even visiting them at their residence on St. Januario, Humpata, in Angola, and thereafter served as a church and national informant and liaised for assistance to the Thirstland trekkers.

== African national figure ==
Dr. B. Spoelstra writes: "This remarkable converted Jew from the Netherlands rises to become an Afrikaans national figure because of his identification with church and people, his broad spiritual outlook and his prophetic vision for the future of an immature Afrikaans people and language." As a fervent supporter of and collaborator with the Afrikanerbond of Rev. S.J. du Toit, during the 1880s he wrote the column "Black Pills" in Die Afrikaanse Patriot (according to Spoelstra the "first mouthpiece of deliberate national Afrikaans politics") in which he prescribed medicine for national diseases.

He was the political advisor of the Albert district (of which Burgersdorp is the seat) where at that time the national consciousness among Afrikaners was characteristic, and a regular collaborator and even editor of the local newspaper, De Stem. He was a deliberate campaigner in the First Afrikaans Language Movement to elevate Afrikaans from spoken to written language. He writes and composes under various pseudonyms: Ou oom Jan, Pastor, Junior, Neef Jan, Neef Jan who writes verses, Jan the verse-maker, N.N., and others.

In May 1886 he advised the action committee for an Afrikaans Bible translation to translate the authorized Dutch text to prevent church unrest, and advocated at the First Afrikaans Language Congress in Paarl (15 and 16 January 1896) that the Bible translation should come from the churches themselves. Cachet also took a leading part in this congress, which also founded the Afrikaans magazine Ons Klyntji.

In the Second Afrikaans Language Movement he became a founding member of the Zuid-Afrikaanse Akademie voor Taal, Letteren en Kunst in 1909.

== Poetry and writing ==
Under the pseudonym “Neef Jan wat versies maak” he wrote a number of (especially Dacostian-religious) poems in Dutch and Afrikaans and he was one of the first contributors to Di Patriot. His most important poem is probably the allegorical “Di Afrikaanse taal”, which was first published in Ons Klyntji in 1896 and was subsequently regularly included in anthologies. In this, the relationship between Afrikaans, Dutch and English is allegorically indicated by the Boerenooi, her Dutch sister and English niece.

Other well-known poems are Op, op met die Vierkleur (which was later set to music by Professor J. de Villiers and became known and popular as a flag song after the First War of Independence), Die Vierkleur in gevaar! (written when it was clear that the Anglo-Boer War was threatening to break out), Jesus’ Hemelvaart and Jesus is umhool gevaar.

He also wrote poems in English, including the long, moralizing poem Vita Christi about the life of Christ.

As can be deduced from the titles, the main themes of his poems are nationality, language and religion. Apart from Di Afrikaans taal (which is included in various anthologies, including Groot verseboek, Die Afrikaans poësie in ’n kuisied en enkele gedigte, Afrikaans letterkunde, Eerste stemme, Digters en digkuns, Uit ons letterkunde, Patriot-digters and Die junior digbundel), his poetry, however, fell into oblivion quite quickly. Die Afrikaans liettegessinger first appeared in Ons Klyntji of June 1896 and was later included in Die junior digbundel.

In prose he wrote a few pieces on politics, language and religion. In Di Patriot he wrote the political column “Zwarte pilletjes” and in 1907 he also attacked the Transvaal school law in the pamphlet Niet om te twisten,maar om des Gewetens wil, because the law did not provide for mother tongue education. He wrote two Dutch religious-historical novels, Het huisgezin van den Huguenot: een verhaal uit den tijd van Lodewijk XIV and Getrouw tot den dood: een verhaal uit den Camisardenkrijg. These novels mix a touch of romanticism with the historical background, but contain little character development. He also published a History of the Huguenots from the years 1521 to 1698 (under the pseudonym Pastor) in Afrikaans (1885) and Dutch (1886). In a humorous-realistic vein he gave an account of Een bezoek bij de Afrikaansche emigranten te St. Januario Humpata (1882), which is included in D. Postma jr.'s Eenige schetsen voor eene geschiedenis van de trekboeren te St. Januario Humpata (1897). During his service in Potchefstroom he was the author of the religious brochure Waarom zingt de Gereformeerde Kerk alleen de Psalms? On the occasion of the fiftieth anniversary of the Gereformeerde Kerk in South Africa in 1909 he compiled a Memorial Book of the 50th anniversary of the Gereformeerde Kerk van South Africa, AD 1859–1909.

The work for which he is best known, however, is Seven Devils and What They Did, which first appeared in Di Patriot from 1882 under the pseudonym Oom Jan and was then printed separately (Di drinkduiwel 1882; Di gelduiwel 1882; Di liegduiwel 1883; Di praatduiwel 1884 and Di spogduiwel 1892), after which it was collected in 1907 together with two more short stories. The last two, Di Afgunsduiwel in 1897 and Di Baasduiwel in 1899, were initially published in Ons Klyntji. In these stories, Cachet entertainingly (and with humor) depicts the activities of the various devils in a realistic environment. Each time, the main sin is embodied in a main character and then the consequences for this character are told. The pieces each have a clear didactic purpose: The money devil's lesson is not to serve money and to desire it above all else, because greed is the root of all evil; in the drinking devil, alcohol makes rehabilitation very difficult, because wisdom is in the can when the wine is in the man; with the lying devil there is the lesson that even though the lie is so swift, the truth will catch up with him; the talking devil is slander that kills the soul and often also the body; the boasting devil's weakness makes you stray from ancestral morals and returning to humility is not easy; the lesson in the envy devil is not to be envious, because when you dig a hole for someone else, you fall into it yourself; the boss devil is hypocrisy and you should not have a hypocritical tongue, because it is a sign that your mind does not work in accordance with your sincere feelings. The language is full of idiomatic expressions and the pieces contain great folk wisdom, which conveys its message by means of a story (with a lot of humor in between). The didactic purpose, however, prevents the characters from being real people and they are consistently portrayed as good or bad. These pieces are considered by several experts to be the highlight of Afrikaans prose from the First Afrikaans Language Movement and F.V. Lategan also considers them to be the beginning of the short story form in Afrikaans. Die liegduiwel is included in the collection Kernbeeld van die Afrikaans kortverhaal under the editorship of F.V. Lategan and Die afgunsduiwel by D.F. Malherbe in Afrikaans literature.

== Education warrior ==
He was a pioneer and fighter for free Christian primary and secondary schools and for Christian higher education, as his former student Ferdinand Postma would later help to realize. His vision and principled program are expressed in published occasional speeches such as the one on 30 November 1889, at the commemoration of the founding of the Reformed Church's theological school; Four occasional speeches. . . (Paarl, 1894), his Who despises the day of small things? Farewell speech, 14 April 1911 (1911), and his criticism of the Transvaal Education Act of Gen. J.C. Smuts from a Christian-Nationalist standpoint: Not to argue, but to conscience: some objections to the Transvaal school bill (Potchefstroom, 1907). In his field of expertise he produced the Memorial Book of the Reformed Church of South Africa 1859–1909 (Potchefstroom, 1909), and apologetic brochures such as Some comments on the booklet 'My arrival at the Dutch Reformed Church in South Africa explained by M.P.A. Coetsee jr.' (Paarl, 1894) and (with Dr. J.D. du Toit) Why does the Reformed Church sing only the Psalms? (1909).

In 1907 he was one of the founders of the Preparatory School in Potchefstroom, the forerunner of the Potchefstroom Gymnasium.

== Last years ==
Cachet turned 60 in 1908. After the transfer from Burgersdorp, everything went on normally at the Theological School in Potchefstroom from 1905 onwards. In 1909 the Reformed Church celebrated its half-century anniversary in Rustenburg. The Dutch Consul-General, who represents Her Majesty Queen Wilhelmina of the Netherlands in South Africa, was also present at the festival for a special purpose. He had to give effect to Queen Wilhelmina's royal decree no. 53 of 2 January 1909, by which Cachet was awarded the Officer's Cross in the Order of Orange-Nassau. This Order, established by law on 4 April 1892, is intended to honour persons who have rendered themselves particularly meritorious to the Queen or the state or to society. It was a special honour that fell to Cachet, but through him also to the Reformed Church and the Theological School.

For Cachet it was a touching moment. He said that day: “At this honor I humbly bow before my God, who has allowed me to enjoy it.” But it was also an honor for the Afrikaner people. Cachet stated that this distinction should not be inferred that he was still Dutch; on the contrary. “I have become an Afrikaner and here will probably be my grave,” he said in his response when receiving the Order. At the next Synod, 1910, the chairman also expressed warm congratulations and gratitude for his services on behalf of the church.

== Retirement ==
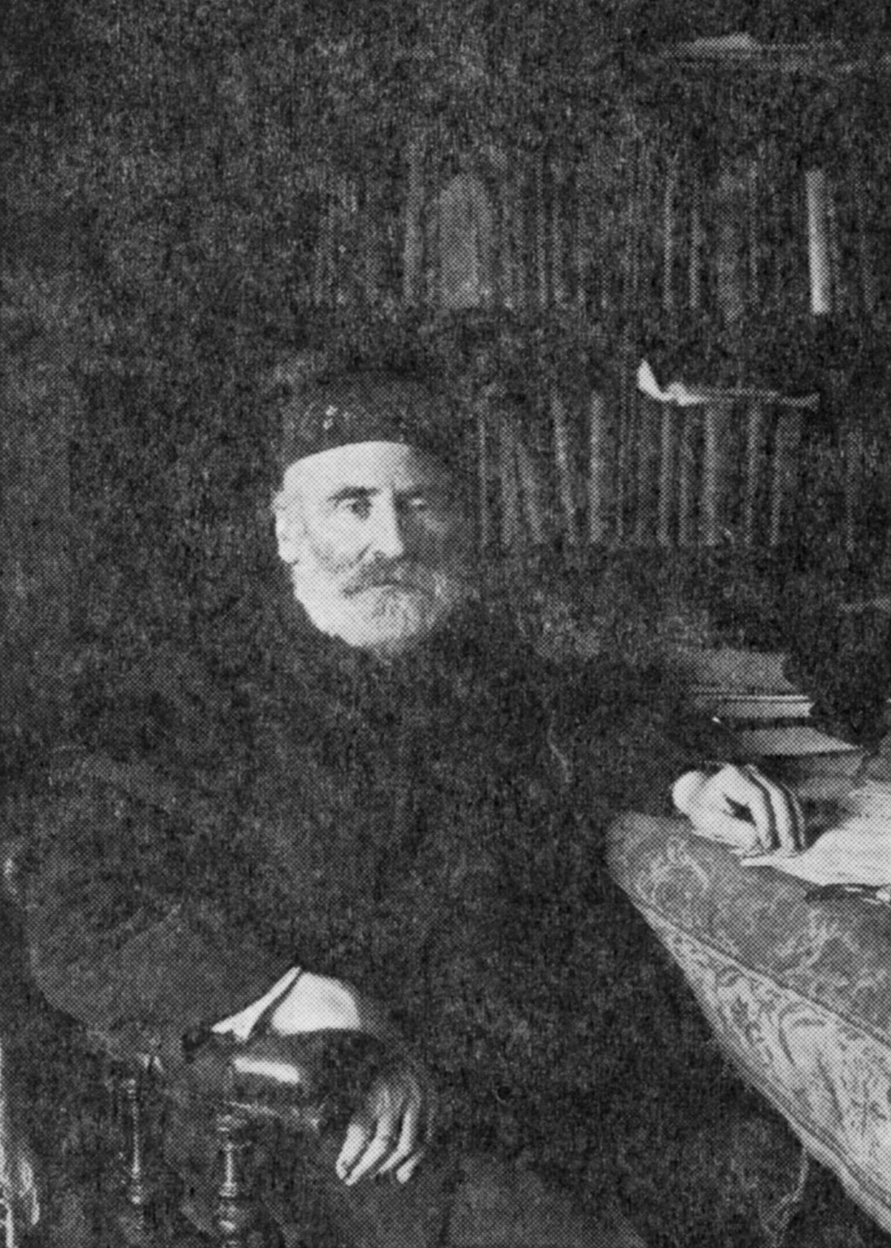

Due to age and illness, Cachet's strength had declined. From the minutes of the trustees' meetings it is clear that he could not tear himself away of his own accord from the work and the school that were dear to him. At their meeting of 1 December 1909, the trustees very tactfully decided to recommend to the synod that, because of Prof. Cachet's declining strength, an assistant be appointed for him, who would then be his successor at the same time. During the synod, which sat from 7 March 1910, it was reported that Prof. Cachet had asked to retire on 1 May 1911. The synod granted the trustees permission to grant the dismissal.

On 14 April 1911 he delivered his farewell address on "Whoever despises the day of small things" (Zech. 4: 10a). Prof. Cachet served the school for almost 26 years. Not only he, according to Cachet, but also the church must give him an account of the 42 years of the school's existence.

When the school was founded, according to Cachet, they had in mind a Christian university. That is why it was designed to train ministers as well as other professions. The need for such education and for a university on a Biblical basis has not diminished; on the contrary: "The temple of science must be built, but. not a science that leads away from God, but one that humbly acknowledges that it is God's servant and that its highest honor is to glorify God". Cachet fears that a flood of unbelief will soon sweep over our country from the universities. God has blessed the work of the school and, according to Cachet, has shown them "who have not despised the small, that He can give the great. That we may then also gratefully acknowledge God's work".

Truly the 42-year period of the school's existence, according to Cachet, was a period of struggle, and no one could testify to it better than he, who fought in the vanguard as professor and curator. The church could do much more, sacrifice much more for the school if it had always realized what "gift of grace" God had given to the church in and through the school. How difficult it was sometimes to move people to set aside a small gift for the school. He who loves the school will sacrifice for it and pray for it. Cachet sees a great future for the school. "I already see in my imagination men fully equipped, scientific men leaving the school, and working for the benefit of the people, country and church." This is no idle dream, according to Cachet, of an old man on the edge of the grave: his eyes would not see it, but the children and grandchildren would. He concludes by saying: "May the Lord in his grace be very close to our church, and work begun by the fathers, let continue and complete by the children".

== Death ==
Cachet died on 21 September 1912 in Potchefstroom.

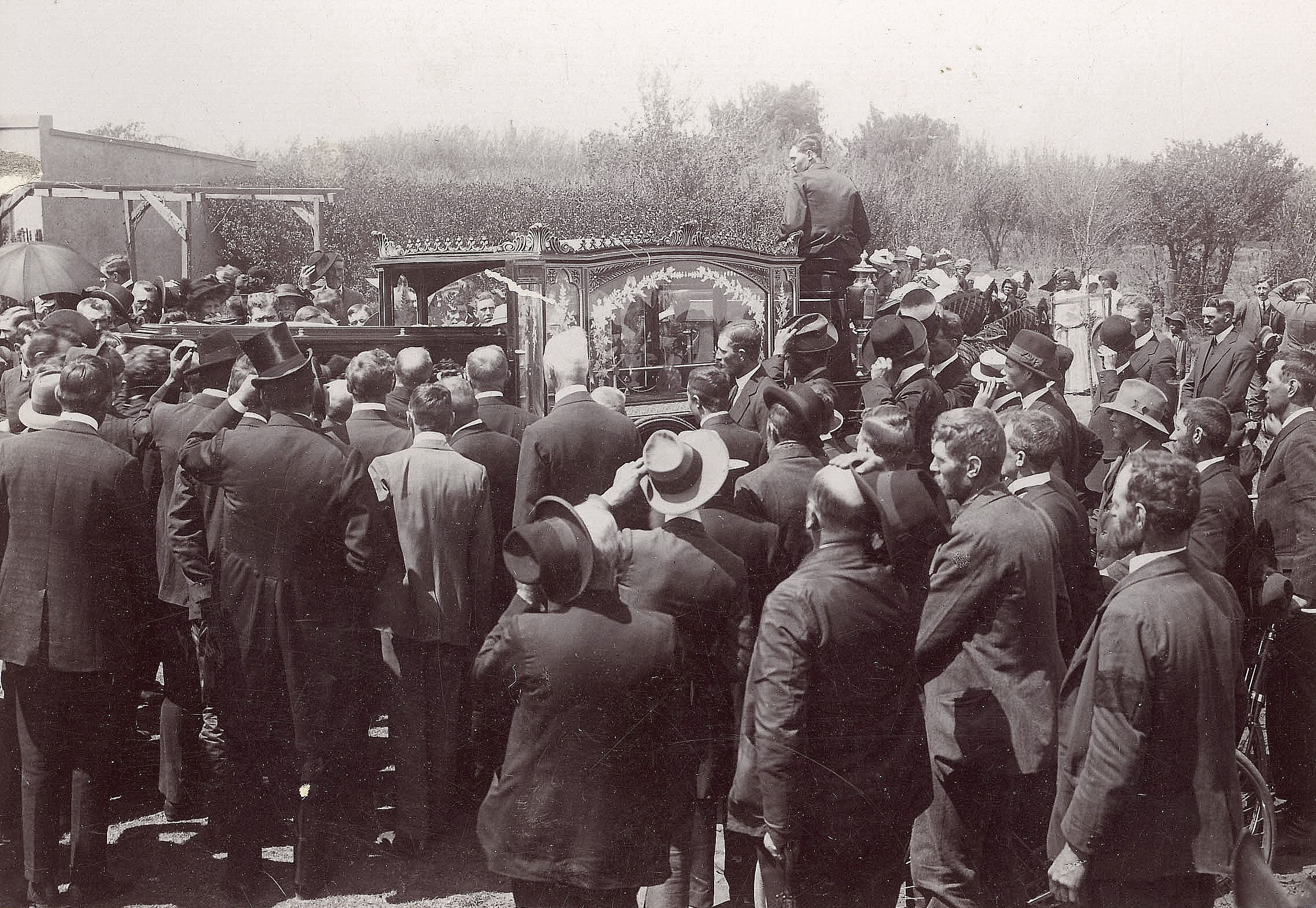
Cachet's funeral in Potchefstroom, 1912

He was only granted a short rest period during which he also performed part-time service at the Theological School. Rev. Petrus Postma delivered his funeral sermon based on Proverbs 10:7. Everyone mourned this humble, simple servant of Jesus Christ, a father, a friend. He was broad in knowledge and science, strong in faith, a pillar of support for church, school and people. Dr. J.D. du Toit calls him a “guide” at his passing: “We are like pilgrims who have come to a crossroads and do not know where to go. We ask for the way, but his voice is silent.” He often spoke of the Theological School as his child. Like a father, he loved it and watched over its interests. He had keen senses for the interests of the school and often spied a danger in the distance that remained unnoticed by others. His passing is also a loss for the country and people. His struggle for the Afrikaner people, the Afrikaans language and for Christian-national education gives him an honourable and lasting place in the establishment and growth of Afrikaans thought in South Africa. He undertook this struggle as one of the founders of the Afrikanerbond. In the language movement of the last century he is a leading figure.

This is what De Zuid-Afrikaan wrote about him at his passing: “The influence that emanated from him, a powerful personality, was manifold. Who can describe what is suffered by his loss in his family, in the school, in the church, in the company.” With Cachet’s passing, a period of the Reformed Church in South Africa came to an end. With him, as Dr. Los put it, the Sturm und Drang period of the church ended. With Dirk Postma and Jan Lion Cachet, the period of the “Fathers” ended, according to Dr. J.D. du Toit in later years. Their place in the church was that of a father. Both focused on forming workers in their training. Cachet was a man of practice with his wisdom in life. He listened to everyone and on all matters, even the smallest ones, he could give wise, fatherly advice. He was in the full sense of the word a father of the school, a father of the students. The description of Dr. J.D. du Toit later years is telling in this regard. “How can I inform the reader about the rich personality of Prof. Cachet, around whom everything here revolves? For me personally, and many with me, I am reminded of the word of Paul: Even if you had ten thousand teachers, you would not have many fathers. A teacher, a professor can appeal to the church, of course in prayerful expectation of God. But a father must be given by God. First then come the fathers and then the teachers. In church history: first the patres and then the doctores. So the Reformed Church in South Africa also had its fathers Postma and Cachet. Then the professors followed. Fathers because of the crisis situation."

At his death, Rev. Sietse Los of the Reformed Church Pretoria noted: "With Prof. Cachet, one period of the Geref. Church of South Africa ended. With him, the 'Sturm-und-Drang' period of the Church ended. Fathers Postma and Cachet have struggled. Paul planted, Apollos watered. God gave the growth. This Apollos has now gone, to the glory of his God. That is why we must let go of the dead. They belong to Christ. But remember him and said: 'Here I am, Lord, at the grave of Cachet. And I swear a dear oath, that my goods, and my flesh, and my blood, are before your holy cause, O Lord, God of our fathers.'"

In 1913 members and honorary members of the Reformed Student Corps Veritas Vincet decided to collect money for a fund, the interest from which would be used to buy books for the library. The front of each book will be marked "Cachet Library".

== Bibliography ==
- Jan Lion Cachet met sy sewe duiwels, Petrus Johannes Nienaber, Pretoria, J.L. van Schaik, 1940.
- Jan Lion Cachet as kerkman, Jan Louis Ras, Potchefstroom Teologiese Publikasies, 1981.
- Jan Lion-Cachet as Calvinis, Jan Louis Ras, Instituut vir Reformatoriese Studie, 1982.
- Eerste Sooie, P.J. Nienaber, 1975.
