= Steynsburg =

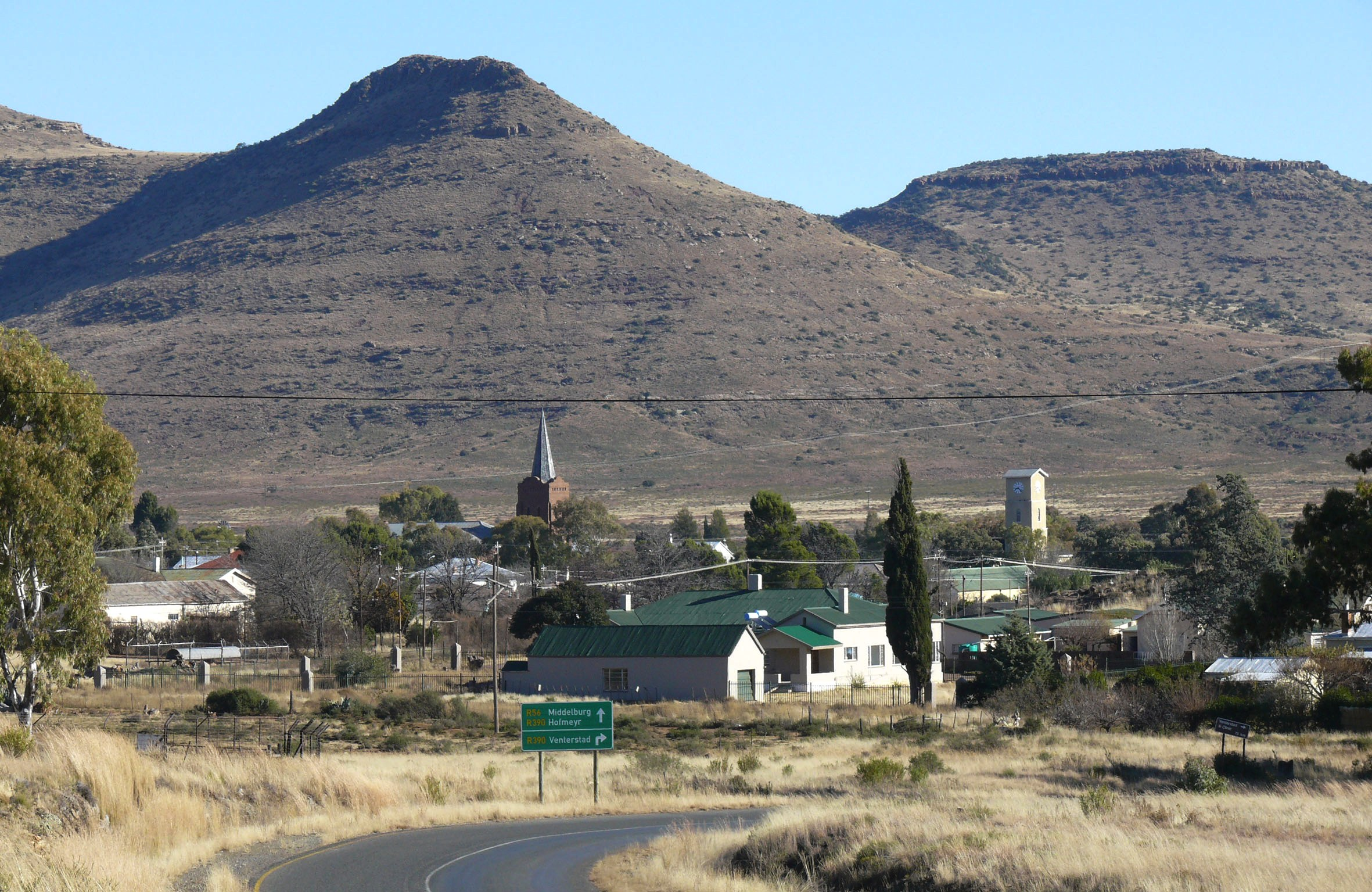
- View of Steynsburg

- Location within Eastern Cape Location within South Africa
- Coordinates: 31°17′47″S 25°49′22″E
- Country: South Africa
- Province: Eastern Cape
- District: Joe Gqabi
- Municipality: Walter Sisulu

Government
  - Type: Local Municipality
  - Councillor: (ANC)

Area
  - Total: 17.4 km^{2} (6.7 sq mi)
- Elevation: 1,450 m (4,760 ft)

Population (2011)
  - Total: 7,212
  - Density: 414/km^{2} (1,070/sq mi)

Racial makeup (2011)
  - Black African: 80.5%
  - Coloured: 14.7%
  - Indian/Asian: 0.2%
  - White: 3.9%
  - Other: 0.6%

First languages (2011)
  - Xhosa: 74.4%
  - Afrikaans: 20.5%
  - English: 1.8%
  - Sotho: 1.0%
  - Other: 2.4%
- Time zone: UTC+2 (SAST)
- Postal code (street): 5920
- PO box: 5920
- Area code: 048

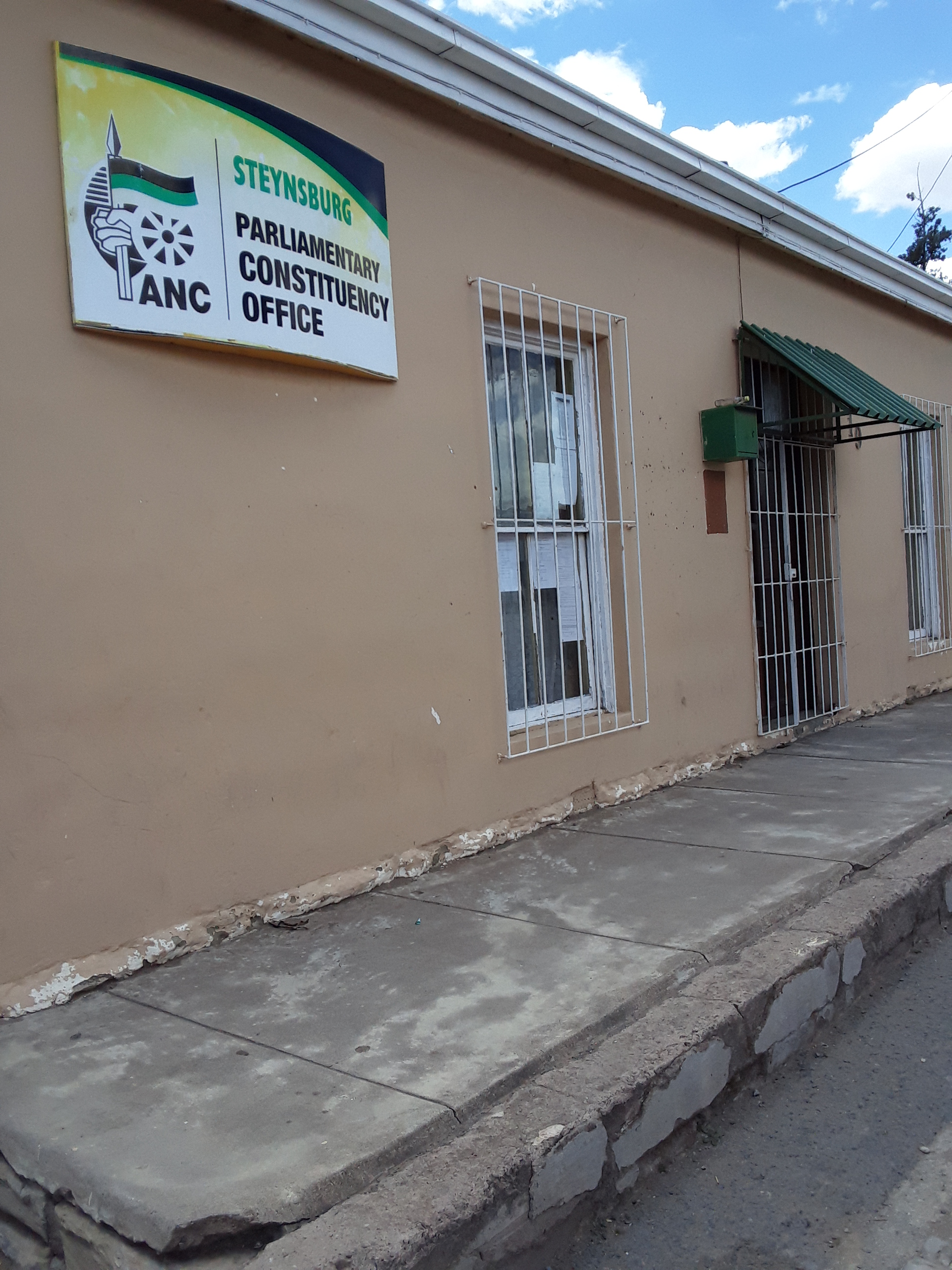
The ANC's parliamentary constituency office in Steynsburg

Steynsburg is a small town in the Walter Sisulu Local Municipality of the Joe Gqabi District Municipality, Eastern Cape province of South Africa. Steynsburg is located on the intersection of the R56 and R390.

The town lies 64 kilometres (40 mi) south-west of Burgersdorp and 48 kilometres (30 mi) north of Hofmeyr. It developed around the Reformed Church established in 1872 and has been administered by a village management board since 1874. Steynsburg is named after Douwe Gerbrandt Steyn, grandfather of President Paul Kruger.

Steynsburg has a well-established Provincial hospital.

It also is the site of the Dutch Reformed Church, Steynsburg, established in 1876.

== Notable citizens ==
- President Paul Kruger
- Tank van Rooyen
- Johannes Cornelis van Rooy
