= R400 (South Africa) =

Regional route in South Africa

Regional route R400

Location
- Country: South Africa

Highway system
- Numbered routes of South Africa
← R399	→ R401

The R400 is a Regional Route in South Africa that connects Riebeek East with the R75 to Jansenville.
