= R390 (South Africa) =

Regional Route in South Africa

Regional route R390
- R390 route map

Route information
- Length: 227 km (141 mi)

Major junctions
- South end: N10 / R61 in Cradock
- R401 / R391 in Hofmeyr; R56 in Steynsburg; R58 in Venterstad
- North end: R701 in Bethulie

Location
- Country: South Africa
- Towns: Bethulie, Oviston, Venterstad, Steynsburg, Hofmeyr, Cradock

Highway system
- Numbered routes of South Africa
← R389	→ R391

The R390 is a Regional Route in South Africa that connects Cradock with Bethulie via Hofmeyr, Steynsburg and Venterstad.

Part of the route from Oviston (Gariep Dam) to Cradock forms part of the shortest road route from Johannesburg to Gqeberha.

== Route ==
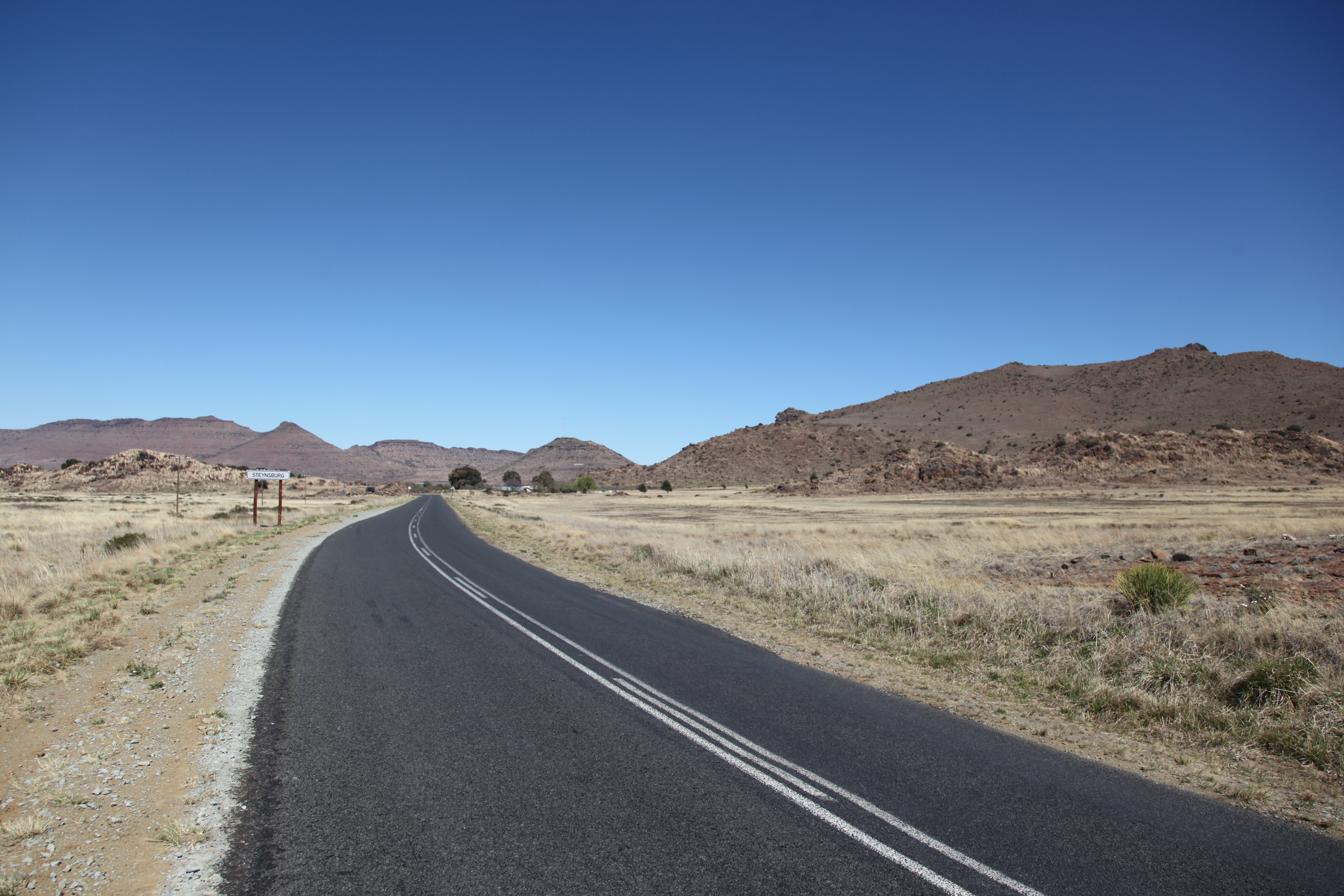
The R390 between Venterstad and Steynsburg

The R390 begins in Nxuba (formerly known as Cradock) at an intersection with the R61 route and the N10 national route, just east of the N10's Great Fish River crossing. It heads north as Stockenstroom Street, then Deary Avenue, then Ziervogel Street, then Hofmeyr Road, to leave the town. It heads northwards for 63 kilometres to reach an intersection with the R401 route in the town of Hofmeyr. It joins the R401 eastwards up to the second junction, where it becomes Van Heerden Street northwards.

The R390 heads north from Hofmeyr for 34 kilometres to reach a T-junction with the R56 route. The R390 joins the R56 and they are one road north-east for 11 kilometres into the town of Steynsburg, where they pass through the town centre eastwards before the R390 becomes the road northwards. The R390 heads north from Steynsburg for 65 kilometres to reach an intersection with the R58 route south of Oviston and its Nature Reserve. The R390 joins the R58 and they are one road eastwards for 4 kilometres to reach the town centre of Venterstad, where the R58 continues as the road eastwards while the R390 bends to the north. It heads north-north-east for 49 kilometres, bypassing the Gariep Dam, to cross the Orange River as the Hennie Steyn Bridge and bypass the town centre of Bethulie to reach its end at a junction with the R701 route.
