= Noorderkerk (Rijssen) =

Church in Rijssen, Netherlands

Coordinates: 52°18′37″N 6°30′56″E

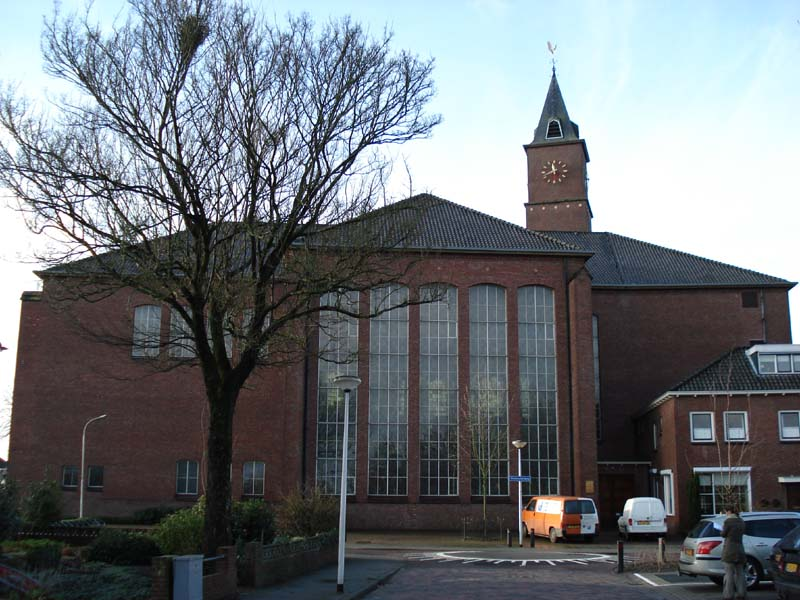
- Noorderkerk
- Location: Rijssen
- Country: Netherlands
- Denomination: Reformed Congregations in the Netherlands

History
- Founded: 1954

Architecture
- Functional status: Church

The Noorderkerk in the Dutch city of Rijssen is one of the largest church buildings in the Netherlands with 1,970 seats. It belongs to the Reformed Congregations in the Netherlands, one of the most conservative of all the Reformed church denominations in the Netherlands. The church building was first consecrated in 1954 with a service by Rev. P. Honkoop.
