= R402 (South Africa) =

Regional route in South Africa

Regional route R402

Location
- Country: South Africa

Highway system
- Numbered routes of South Africa
← R401	→ R403

The R402 is a Regional Route in South Africa that connects the N2 between Stormsrivier and Humansdorp with the R62 between Humansdorp and Joubertina.

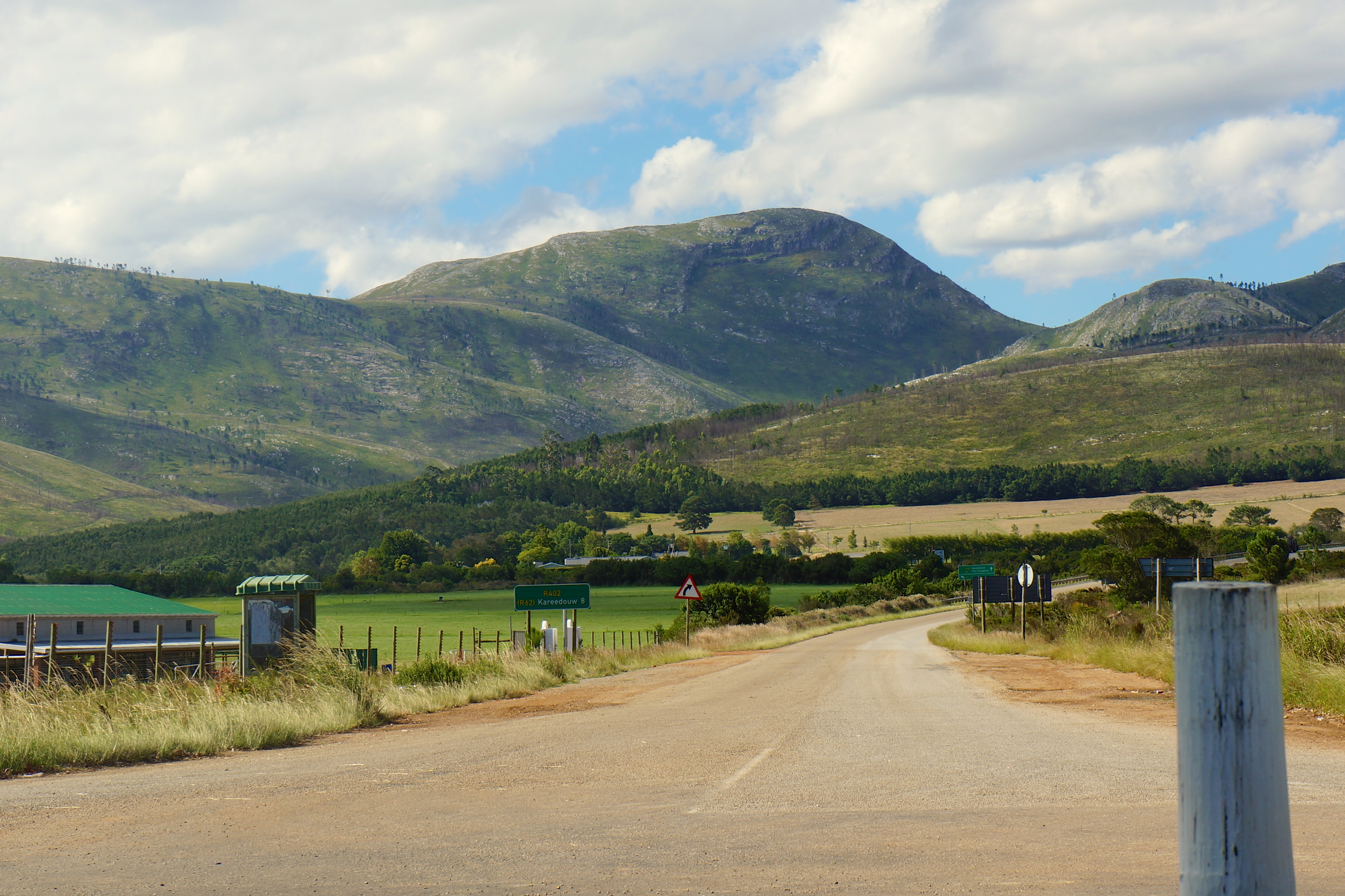
The R402 near the Kareedouw turn off
