= Hofmeyr =

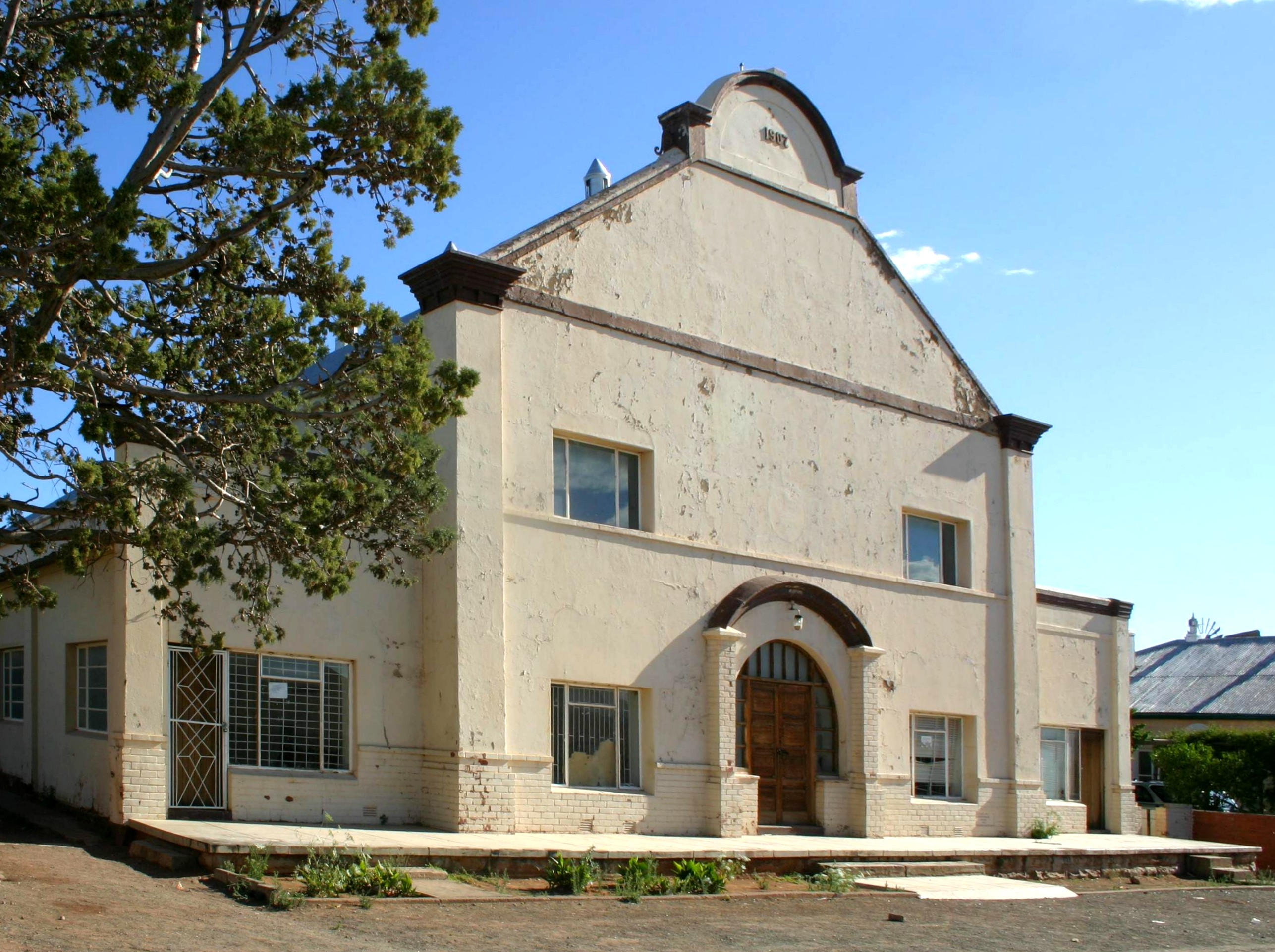
- Old Hofmeyr town hall built in 1907

- Location within Eastern Cape Location within South Africa
- Coordinates: 31°38′S 25°48′E
- Country: South Africa
- Province: Eastern Cape
- District: Chris Hani
- Municipality: Enoch Mgijima
- Established: 1873

Government
  - Type: Ward 5
  - mayor: khaya nohatala Education =diploma in local government management (African National Congress(1994))

Area
  - Total: 16.9 km^{2} (6.5 sq mi)

Population (2011)
  - Total: 3,680 (Hofmeyr 326 Luxolweni 3,354)
  - Density: 218/km^{2} (564/sq mi)

Racial makeup (2011)
  - Black African: 80.3%
  - Coloured: 15.8%
  - Indian/Asian: 0.4%
  - White: 3.2%
  - Other: 0.2%

First languages (2011)
  - Xhosa: 78.3%
  - Afrikaans: 18.2%
  - English: 1.5%
  - Other: 2.0%
- Time zone: UTC+2 (SAST)
- Postal code (street): 5930
- PO box: 5930
- Area code: 048

Hofmeyr is a small Karoo town in the Eastern Cape Province of South Africa, 20 km west of the Bamboesberg mountain range. It lies 64 km north-east of Cradock at an altitude of 1,252 metres. According to the 2011 census, the population of Hofmeyr proper is about 326 persons and the neighbouring township of Luxolweni is about 3,354. In former times, it lay at the centre of a flourishing sheep-farming district and managed some salt pans 10 km to its west.

Founded in 1873, the town was initially named Maraisburg. To avoid confusion with the Gauteng area of Maraisburg it was renamed Hofmeyr in 1911 in honour of Jan Hendrik Hofmeyr (Onze Jan), a campaigner for the equal treatment of Afrikaans and English and a prominent figure in the Eerste Taalbeweging.

== Notable features in Hofmeyr ==
=== Pink Church ===
The local Dutch Reformed Church in Hofmeyr was built a year or two after the town was established and upgraded in 1933. The church was painted in a pastel choral colour to blend in with other buildings.

=== Hofmeyr Skull ===
The Hofmeyr Skull, belonging to a 36,000 year old anatomically modern human, was found in 1952 in the dry wash of the Vlekpoort River just outside Hofmeyr.
