= Dordrecht Reformed Church =

Church in the Eastern Cape

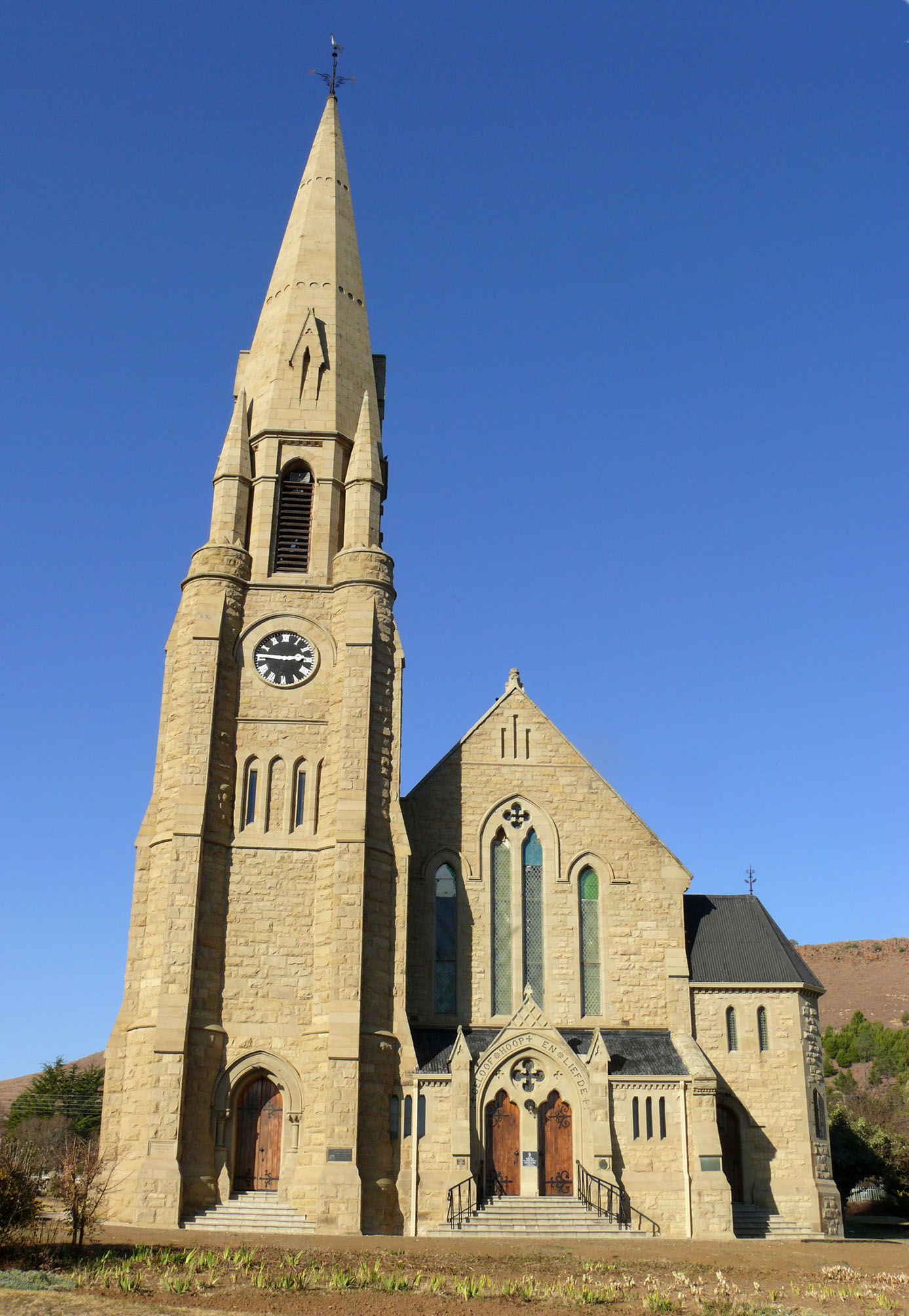

The Dordrecht Reformed Church is the 70th oldest congregation in the Dutch Reformed Church and the 16th oldest congregation in the Synod of Eastern Cape, although it is the 71st and 17th, respectively, to have been founded, because it moved up a place due to the merger of the NG congregation Middelburg with the Middelburg-Uitsig Reformed Church in 2010. The center of the congregation is the town of Dordrecht, Eastern Cape.

== Ministers ==
- Carel Trappes Scholtz, August 1861–1863
- E.Z.J. de Beer, September 1864–1878
- D.J.J. van Velden, August 1878–1888
- W.A. Alheit, 22 September 1888 – 7 January 1894
- D.S. Botha, September 1894 – January 1898
- Johannes Francois Marais, 23 March 1899–1921 (emeritus)
- John Foster van Wyk, 1920–1938
- Ruben Daniel Rens, 20 February 1925–1926
- Constantin Andreas Beyers, 1928 – 25 July 1946 (died in office)
- Daniel Jacobus Retief, 1944–1945
- Johan Gregorius Bezuidenhoud, 1947–1950
- Jan Theunis Schutte, 5 May 1951–1960
- Hendrik Schalk Theron, 1961–1967
- Hugo Olivier Pienaar, 6 April 1968 – 19 November 1971
- Frans Engelbrecht van der Merwe, 1972–1976
- Johannes Matthys Burger, 1977–1983
- Evert (Hansie) Gerhard Johannes de Graaff Schutte, 25 February 1983 – 23 September 1990
- Christoffel (Christoff) Koch, 18 January 1991 – 2002
- Dirk Cornelius Klynsmith, 2002–2006
- Johan Stephanus Marais, 2007–2009
- Pieter Johannes Retief, 2009 – present

== Sources ==
- Krüger, prof. D.W. 1976. Suid-Afrikaanse Biografiese Woordeboek. Pretoria: Nasionale Raad vir Sosiale Navorsing, Departement van Hoër Onderwys.
- Olivier, ds. P.L., 1952. Ons gemeentelike feesalbum. Kaapstad en Pretoria: N.G. Kerk-uitgewers.
