= Doringnek =

Mountain pass on the R335 between Addo and Somerset East, South Africa

- Traversed by: R335

Third Approach
- Location: Suurberg mountain range
- Coordinates: 33.37985°S 25.70787°E
- Doringnek (Eastern Cape)

Doringnek Pass (or just Doringnek) is situated in the Suurberg mountain range on the regional road R335, between Addo and Somerset East, in the Eastern Cape, South Africa. The pass is just over 9 km and is a gravel road that is navigable by car.

== See also ==
- Suurberg Pass – Mountain pass on the R335, Eastern Cape, South Africa
