= Nqweba, South Africa =

Nqweba Kirkwood
- Nqweba
- Location within Eastern Cape Location within South Africa
- Coordinates: 33°24′01″S 25°26′33″E
- Country: South Africa
- Province: Eastern Cape
- District: Sarah Baartman
- Municipality: Sundays River Valley

Area
  - Total: 7.18 km^{2} (2.77 sq mi)

Population (2011)
  - Total: 13,765
  - Density: 1,920/km^{2} (4,970/sq mi)

Racial makeup (2011)
  - Black African: 67.51%
  - Coloured: 24.29%
  - Indian/Asian: 0.20%
  - White: 7.17%
  - Other: 0.84%

First languages (2011)
  - Afrikaans: 31.78%
  - IsiXhosa: 59.06%
  - English: 1.92%
  - Other: 7.24%
- Time zone: UTC+2 (SAST)
- Postal code (street): 6120
- PO box: 6120
- Area code: 042

Nqweba, until 2024 Kirkwood, is a town in the Eastern Cape Province of South Africa. It is situated on the banks of the Sundays River in the eponymously named Sundays River Valley, which forms part of the Sundays River Valley Municipality in the Sarah Baartman District Municipality of the Eastern Cape.

== Geography and climate ==
Nqweba is situated about 80 km (50 mi) from the Indian Ocean and about 100 meters (330 ft) above sea level.

The South African Weather Service recorded a temperature of 50.3 °C (122.5 °F) in Kirkwood in 1928 - the highest temperature ever recorded in South Africa.

To the north of Nqweba are the Rietberg Mountains with the Uyepoort (Onion Gateway), which provides passage to the Zuurberg Mountains and the Addo Elephant National Park.

== History ==
The Governor of the Cape Colony, Sir John Francis Cradock, gave the first farms in the Sundays River Valley to the leaders of the successful burger commandos for their role in the victories in the border wars of 1811 and 1812.

These farms were awarded to Magistrate Cuyler (originally from the United States) of Uitenhage, who received Geelhoutboom (Yellowwood Tree, later Dunbrody); Commandant Ignatius Muller, who received Klaaskraal (Klaas' Corral, situated just outside what is now Kirkwood) and Field Cornet J. S. van Niekerk, who received Gouwernements Belooning (Government's Reward). It is on the latter farm that Kirkwood would be established many decades later.

In 1877 James Somers Kirkwood, an auctioneer from Port Elizabeth, arrived to auction off Gouwernements Belooning. When a flooded Sundays River prevented Kirkwood from reaching this farm he climbed a nearby hill (known today as The Lookout) instead. From there he had a view of the entire valley and had a vision of the valley - which was overgrown by bushes at the time - being transformed into irrigated fields with fruit trees. He also envisioned this farm produce being delivered via river barges to Port Elizabeth.

Shortly afterwards, James himself purchased "Goewernements Belooning" as well as some other farms in the valley. He subsequently founded the Sundays River Land and Irrigation Company as well as the village of Bayville.

Later, Kirkwood started to prepare the land for irrigation, but despite a very positive prospectus and very good publicity, nobody was interested in buying stock in his venture. One of the reasons may be that it coincided with the big diamond rush to Kimberley. In consequence, his company eventually failed and was declared bankrupt. Kirkwood died in 1889, a financially and spiritually broken man.

However, Kirkwood can be considered to have been ahead of his time as his vision became true in the next century when the Sundays River Irrigation Project and eventually the Orange River Water Project were built. His name also lives on in the town of Kirkwood that was founded in 1912 on his first farm, Gouwernements Belooning.

At the beginning of the 19th century, the Sundays River formed the eastern border of the then Cape Colony and was the area around Kirkwood consequently the scene of many armed conflicts - Khoi against Xhosa, Khoi and Xhosa together against the Boers and British together and finally the Boers against the British during the Second Anglo-Boer War.

During this war, General Jan Smuts and his Commando of 250 men passed through the valley on their epic campaign to the northwest. Indeed, the three Boers who died the furthest south during the war were killed on Cecil John Rhodes's farm Brakkefontein. Shortly after these casualties were incurred a major battle took place on the Bedrogsfontein mountain pass.

== Economy ==
Nqweba's subtropical climate makes it ideal for the growing of citrus fruits and this has made it the citrus capital of the Eastern Cape. Indeed, Nqweba is the center of one of the largest citrus-growing regions in South Africa with approximately 120 square kilometres (30,000 acres) of citrus orchards. Approximately 18 million cartons of oranges, lemons, grapefruit and other citrus fruit are exported from this region each year.

The Sundays River Citrus Company employs approximately 1500 people on a seasonal basis to pack the export citrus. There are packhouses in Nqweba, Addo and Summerville.

Nqweba is also the capital town of the Sundays River Valley Municipality, which also includes places such as Paterson, Addo and Enon, and has a total population of about 70,000 people.

Roses are also grown in the area and there are several game farms situated nearby. The town also hosts an annual Wildlife Festival.

A panoramic view of Nqweba and the surrounding citrus groves is possible from The Lookout in the Rietberg Mountains, where J. S. Kirkwood had his vision. The Lookout is also well known as a dinosaur fossil site. The first complete dinosaur fossil to be found in South Africa, nicknamed "Kirky", was discovered near here. Kirky was smaller than 2 meters.

== Renaming ==
In March 2024, the town was officially renamed Nqweba, which means 'meeting place' in isiXhosa.

== Notable people who lived in Kirkwood/Nqweba ==
- Theo Aronson was a famous biographer of European royalty. He died in 2003.
