= Olifantskop Pass =

Suurberg mountain pass, Eastern Cape, South Africa

- Location of the pass in the Eastern Cape
- Elevation: 723 m (2,372 ft)
- Length: 9.658 kilometres (6.001 mi)
- Traversed by: N10

Third Approach
- Location: Between Paterson and Cookhouse
- Range: Suurberge
- Coordinates: 33°19′08″S 25°56′47″E
- Olifantskop Pass (Eastern Cape)

Olifantskop Pass (lit. transl. Elephant's head) is situated in the Eastern Cape province of South Africa. It carries three to four lanes of road traffic on the N10 national road over the Suurberg mountains between Paterson and Cookhouse.

== History ==
Prior to the construction of Olifantskop Pass in 1955, the Suurberg Pass was the main route from Gqeberha to Johannesburg for 100 years.

On 27 June 1985, anti-apartheid activist Sicelo Mhlauli of the Cradock Four was arrested at a roadblock on the pass.

== See also ==
- Suurberg Pass – Mountain pass on the R335, Eastern Cape, South Africa
- Addo Elephant National Park – Wildlife conservation park near Gqeberha in the Eastern Cape, South Africa
- Shamwari Game Reserve – Game reserve outside Gqeberha, Eastern Cape, South Africa
