= Darlington Dam =

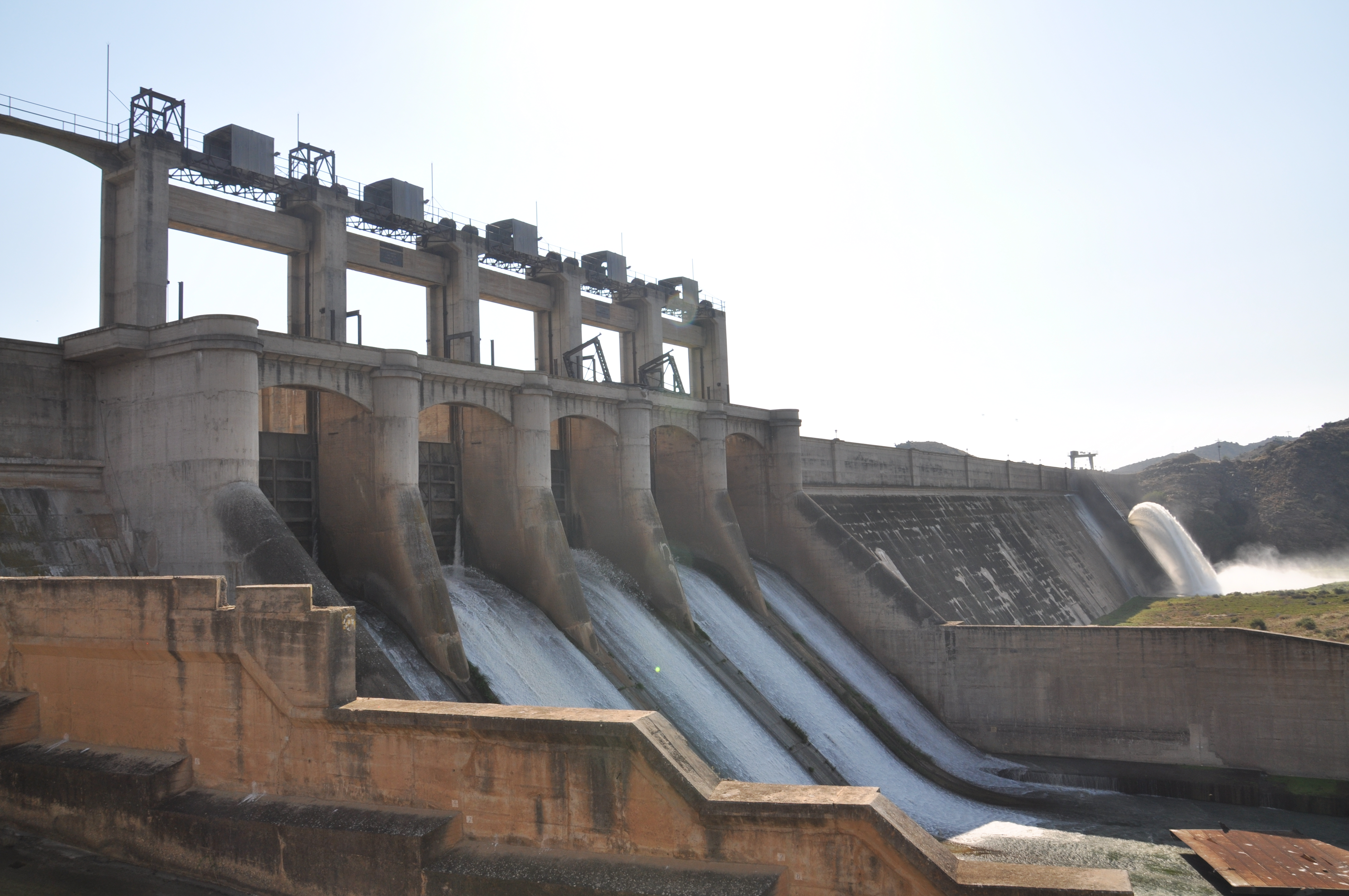
- Interactive map of Darlington Dam
- Official name: Darlington Dam
- Country: South Africa
- Location: Eastern Cape
- Coordinates: 33°12′22″S 25°8′1″E
- Purpose: Irrigation, industrial and domestic
- Construction began: 1918
- Opening date: 1922 (upgraded 1951/52)
- Owner: Department of Water Affairs

Dam and spillways
- Type of dam: Gravity dam
- Impounds: Sundays River
- Height: 35.3 m
- Length: 230 m
- Dam volume: 209 000 m^{3}
- Spillways: 5
- Spillway type: Controlled (gates)
- Spillway capacity: 632 m^{3}/s (max - combined)

Reservoir
- Creates: Lake Mentz
- Total capacity: 187 000 000 m^{3}
- Catchment area: 16 700 km^{2}
- Surface area: 3452.7 ha (FSC)

Darlington Dam, also referred to as Lake Mentz, is a gravity type dam situated in the Addo Elephant National Park confining the Sundays River, near Kirkwood, in the Eastern Cape, South Africa.

== History ==
The primary objective of building the dam was to provide adequate and perennial supplies of water for large-scale irrigation in a fertile area, particularly by storing and controlling flood waters. By 1917, the Sundays River Irrigation Board was established and took over the project from the government's Irrigation Department in 1918. The construction experienced many setbacks, including lack of materials and machinery, with shortages caused by the First World War, unsuitable labour (returning soldiers), the 1918 influenza epidemic, bubonic plague, very difficult logistics and drought. The delays in completion caused severe financial difficulties to the irrigation companies and eventually the State had to take over the debts of the irrigators and £2,350,000 had to be written off. The dam was completed in 1922 and only filled by 1928, the delay a result of extensive drought.

The original dam was designed to store 142 million m^{3}. The high sediment yield of the Sundays River meant that sediment delivery into the reservoir basin quickly reduced its capacity. The dam wall was raised by 1.5 m in 1935 and again by 5.8 m (total capacity 327,628,072 m^{3}) in 1951/52 to cope with the loss of storage volume. The rebuilt dam was opened on 26 April 1952, by the then Minister of Land and Irrigation, J. G. Strijdom, with work supervised by the Sundays River Irrigation Board, with J. Kevin Murphy as the consulting engineer. By 1979 the reservoir had lost 41.47% of its design storage capacity, with ~135,870,000 m^{3} of sediment captured behind the wall.

The impoundment now has a capacity of 187,000,000 cubic metres (6.6×10^{9} cu ft), with a 35.3 metres (116 ft)-high wall. Its primary purpose is irrigation, industrial and domestic use.

The serious drought of 1966 and 1967 emphasized the necessity to commence work on the Skoenmakers Canal (capacity: 22 m^{3}/s) to link the Great Fish River to Darlington Dam as soon as possible. In view of an expected increase in irrigation below Darlington Dam and the demand for water in the Port Elizabeth metropolitan area, it was decided to replace the Wellington Grove pumping station with De Mistkraal Weir upstream of Wellington Grove and a short section of connecting canal to the beginning of the Skoenmakers Canal.

== See also ==
- List of reservoirs and dams in South Africa
- List of rivers of South Africa
