= Suurberg Pass =

Mountain pass on the R335, Eastern Cape, South Africa

- Traversed by: R335
- Avg gradient: 1.352 %

Third Approach
- Location: Between Coerney and Somerset East
- Coordinates: 33°17′00″S 25°43′13″E
- Suurberg Pass (Eastern Cape)

Suurberg Pass (lit. transl. sour mountain) is traverses the Suurberg range in the Eastern Cape province of South Africa, on the regional road R335, between Coerney and Somerset East. The pass hugs the western edge of the Nyati section of the Addo Elephant National Park.

== History ==
Construction of the pass began in 1849, with Henry Fancourt White the lead engineer in charge of 250 convicts. In 1853, during construction of the first phase of the pass, White resigned. The project was taken over by Mathew Woodifield. In 1858, the pass was completed up to Somerset East and became part of the main road between Port Elizabeth and Johannesburg for a hundred years when Olifantskop Pass was built in 1955.

== See also ==
- Doringnek – Mountain pass on the R335 between Addo and Somerset East, South Africa
