= Suurberg =

Mountain range in southern Eastern Cape, South Africa

- Zuurberg
- Location within South Africa Location within Eastern Cape

Highest point
- Coordinates: 33°16′45″S 25°30′56″E

Dimensions
- Length: 70 km (43 mi)

Geography
- Location: Eastern Cape, South Africa

The Suurberg (also Zuurberg or Suurberge) is a mountain range near the Addo Elephant National Park in the southern Sarah Baartman District Municipality of the Eastern Cape, South Africa. The range of some 70 kilometres long (west to east) is situated at the eastern end of the Cape Fold Belt, and rises just north of the towns of Kirkwood and Bontrug (in the Sundays River Valley), and Paterson further east. Its rugged terrain is intersected by many defiles and ridge lines, rising from some 200 m a.s.l. in the south to 936 m a.s.l. The southern slopes are drained by various tributaries of the Sundays River, including the Kabouga, Uie, Wit and Krom rivers. Two passes cross the mountain from south to north, namely the Suurberg Pass and Olifantskop Pass.

Oldenburgia grandis and the Suurberg cycad are striking plants that are endemic to the mountain range and its vicinity.

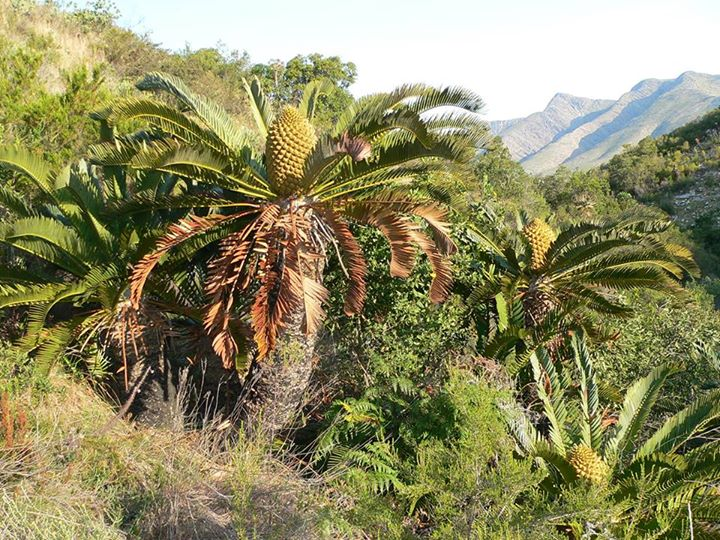
Endemic Suurberg cycads in a valley of the Suurberg

Artefacts discovered in the Melkhoutboom Cave are thought to be 15 000 years old.
