= Coerney =

- Location within Eastern Cape Location within South Africa
- Coordinates: 33.4573°S 25.7225°E
- Country: South Africa
- Province: Eastern Cape
- District: Sarah Baartman
- Municipality: Sundays River Valley
- Established: 1752
- Time zone: UTC+2 (SAST)

Coerney is a river and railway station 64 km north of Gqeberha, on the route to Rosmead, situated in the Sundays River Valley in Sarah Baartman District Municipality, in Eastern Cape province, South Africa.

Recorded as early as 1752 (in a journal of A.F. Beutler), the name is derived from Khoekhoen and means 'narrow (not "small") forest'. It was formerly also known as Hoender Craal, from Dutch parelhoender, 'guinea-fowl'.
