= Melkhoutboom Cave =

Archaeological site in the Addo Elephant National Park, South Africa

- Location in South Africa Melkhoutboom Cave (Eastern Cape)
- 33°19′S 25°17′E
- Location: Zuurberg Mountains, Sarah Baartman District Municipality, Eastern Cape Province
- Region: South Africa

Melkhoutboom Cave is an archaeological site dating to the Later Stone Age, located in the Zuurberg Mountains, Cape Folded Mountain Belt, in the Addo Elephant National Park, Sarah Baartman District Municipality in the Eastern Cape Province of South Africa.

== History ==
Investigation of Melkhoutboom Cave and other sites in the Eastern Cape Province was spurred by earlier archaeological discoveries, including the discovery in the 1850s by Thomas Holden Bowker of a number of stone artefacts at the mouth of the Great Fish River, about 120 km (74.6 mi) southeast of the cave. John Hewitt, the director of the Albany Museum in Grahamstown from 1910 to 1958, excavated over twenty caves and rock shelters in the area – including an excavation at Melkhoutboom from 1930 to 1931 – and published his findings in a number of papers, which attracted the interest of collectors and helped to build up a large collection of artefacts at the museum. In 1963 Hilary Deacon of the Albany Museum initiated a research project “The Prehistory of the Eastern Cape” as a means of continuing Hewitt's research and evaluating the collection of artefacts his research had helped to amass. The project involved the excavation of a number of rock shelters in the Grahamstown area, including Wilton Large Rockshelter and Cave, Glen Craig, Roodekrantz, and Spitzkop. Hewitt himself was also involved in excavations at Melkhoutboom, as well as Middelkop, Tefelburg Hall, and several sites near the Kabeljous River Mouth.

One of the main focuses of the "Prehistory of the Eastern Cape" research project was analysing the subsistence ecology of human populations of the early Holocene era in southern Africa. The information gained from Hewitt's work, specifically the excavations at Melkhoutboom Cave in 1967 and 1969, were an important factor in steering the program's focus in this direction.

== Geography ==
Melkhoutboom Cave is located in the Eastern Cape Province of South Africa, about 80 kilometres north of the coastal city of Port Elizabeth and about 160 km (99.4 mi) northeast of the Klasies River Mouth, the location of another important South African archaeological site. The cave is situated within a steep ravine in the Cape Folded Mountain Belt, a range of mountains that marks the boundary between the more tropical ecological zone of the inland Karoo and the coastal plain.

=== Geography of the Eastern Cape ===
The Eastern Cape can be divided into four main geographic areas: the coastal strip, the coastal plain, the Cape Folded Mountain Belt, and the Karoo-Cape Midlands. The coastal strip consists mostly of sand beaches bordered by dunes to the north. There is little vegetation, and subsistence in this area during the Later Stone Age was probably mainly shellfish – as evidenced by the abundance of shell middens dating to within the last 12,000 years – as well as fish, crustaceans, great white sharks, and birds. The coastal plain is a strip of land approximately 35 km (21.7 mi) wide, beginning at the edge of the coastal strip and rising to an elevation of 300 m (980 ft) at the base of the Cape Folded Mountain Belt. This area is mainly grassland and shrubland, with many succulents and other edible plants and shrubs. The Cape Folded Mountain Belt runs east–west across the Cape, dividing the coastal plain and the Karoo-Cape Midlands. This area contains grassland, shrubland, fynbos, and scree forest, all with a variety of vegetation; the fauna is also varied, including antelope (including grysbok, duiker, and bushbuck), wild pigs, and other small- to medium-sized mammals. The Karoo-Cape Midlands is located inland of the Cape Folded Mountain Belt, sloping upward toward the Great Escarpment at the southern end of the Karoo Basin. This area has a much drier climate than the zones farther south; severe droughts are common, and this was likely the case in the Middle Stone Age as well, affecting habitability in this area. A variety of large mammals, such as rhinoceros, elephants, hippopotamus, wildebeest, eland, and large antelope, used to inhabit this area but have since migrated or gone extinct due to changes in indigenous vegetation caused by overgrazing.

=== Geography of Melkhoutboom Cave ===
Melkhoutboom Cave is located about 35 km (21.7 mi) from the coast in the Cape Folded Mountain Belt, inside a steep, forested ravine that runs north to south along the northernmost ridge of the Suurberg Range and ends at the Beans River. The environment within the ravine can be described as evergreen temperate forest, and there is a diverse assortment of vegetation throughout the ravine and the surrounding area, including tall trees throughout the ravine and surrounding the opening of the cave, which is about 6 meters above the floor of the ravine.

The cave itself is about 14 m (46 ft) wide at its entrance, and about 14 m (46 ft) deep at its deepest point, with a domed roof 6 to 8 m (20 to 26 ft). The potential area that could be occupied within the cave measures about 150 m^{2} (1,600 sq ft). At the back of the main cave is a higher, smaller cave that shows some evidence of occupation in the form of ash and scattered artefacts, but has not been excavated.

== Excavation ==
Melkhoutboom Cave was first excavated in 1930 by John Hewitt, whose findings prompted it to be included in the Albany Museum's “Prehistory of the Eastern Cape” project, initiated in 1963. Excavations took place at the cave as part of this project in 1967 and 1969. The initial small-scale excavation of a 3 m × 1 m (9.8 ft × 3.3 ft) test pit in 1967 was conducted to confirm and clarify the findings from Hewitt's original excavation in the early 1930s. The subsequent excavation in 1969 was planned based on this initial excavation, extending and building upon it. Both excavations used the same grid system running north–south and east–west.

Of the approximately 150 square meters of “living area” inside the cave, about a fifth has been excavated, and only half of that area has been excavated all the way down to bedrock. This was primarily due to constraints on time and resources, which stopped excavation from being extended to promising areas or even bringing the whole of the excavated area down to bedrock; instead, efforts were focused on obtaining a large sample of artefacts and floral and faunal remains from the area already excavated.

The excavated area of Melkhoutboom Cave was divided into stratigraphic units based on soil composition and cultural content. The names given to these units and their estimated ages based on radiocarbon dates of hearths or artefacts are as follows, from bedrock to surface: Basal Unit (15,400 years BP), Rock Fall Unit (10,500 years BP), Medium Brown Series Unit (7,660 years BP), Wilton Base Marker Unit (7,300 years BP), Marker Unit (indirectly dated by comparison to preceding and overlying units), Wedge Unit (6,980 years BP), Main Bedding Unit (5,900 years BP), Cut Away Frontal Unit (2,870 years BP), the Overlie of the Main Bedding Unit, and the Surface Unit. The Wilton Base Marker Unit in particular appears to represent a major technological break from underlying units based on the cultural material found.

== Material culture/findings ==
=== Features ===
A number of non-artefactual features were recorded inside the cave. Hearths and ash constituted a large portion of the excavated deposits, and the excavated area also included a number of pits that appear to have been used for storing fruits used for their oils. Most of these pits have been dated to about 3,000 years BP, and are comparable to pits of similar ages found at nearby Boomplaas Cave.

During his 1930 excavation, Hewitt noted a number of wooden pegs stuck into cracks in the walls of the cave. He did not record the number of pegs or their positioning, and none of these pegs remained by the time the 1967 and 1969 excavations took place, although there were some bits of wood found within some fissures in the cave walls. The 1969 excavation also unearthed five evenly spaced post holes about 75 mm (3.0 in) in diameter and 75 to 100 mm (3.0 to 3.9 in) deep, one of which still contained a shard of wood, which may be evidence of some sort of modifications made to the inside of the cave.

Two cave paintings were found inside Melkhoutboom Cave – one frog painted in yellow and red, and one bushbuck ewe painted below it, the latter being more faded. Both paintings were located high on the cave walls outside of easy reach, suggesting symbolic or totemic significance.

The 1969 excavation uncovered two burials, both of children. The first was of an infant less than a year old, buried in a narrow shaft capped by a flat quartzite rock. The mouth of the burial shaft opens into the Wilton Base Marker Unit, and the remains have been dated to 7,300 years BP. No grave goods were associated with this burial. The second burial was of a child about five years old, buried in a squatting position, again in a narrow shaft – this time, however, opening into the Main Bedding Unit and capped by a 6-millimeter-deep layer of powdered red ochre as well as three large stones on top of the ochre. This burial was associated with several grave goods: three notched shells and 14 baked earthen beads, which are thought to be part of a necklace.

=== Artefacts ===
The 1967 and 1969 excavations uncovered numerous artefacts that can be sorted in many ways, but are often sorted based on material, with lithics being considered separately from artefacts made from materials other than stone.

==== Lithics ====
The stone artefacts found at Melkhoutboom are used as the basis for sorting all of the artefacts in the Melkhoutboom sequence into three different artefact industries based on the typology of their lithics: the Wilton Industry, found in the Wilton Base Marker and overlying units; the Albany Industry, found in the Medium Brown Series and Rockfall units; and the Robberg Industry, found in the Basal unit. These industries were based on terminology already adopted by archaeologists in the Eastern Cape region.

The Wilton Industry is primarily characterised by microliths and hafted tools, often made from chalcedony or silcrete. The two earlier industries are primarily composed of quartzite flakes and are therefore easily distinguished from the later Wilton Industry.

Lithics belonging to the Wilton Industry can be further sorted into classes based on their form and function. Among the types of stone tools found at Melkhoutboom were chunks, chips, cores, core reduced pieces, battered pieces and debitage, unmodified flakes, retouched and modified flakes, scrapers, segments, backed bladelets, borers, adzes, anvils, hammerstones, grindstones, milled edge pebbles, and other broken or miscellaneous pieces.

Besides stone tools, other stone artefacts found at Melkhoutboom included red and yellow ochre, pieces of shale and micaceous sandstone (which are not found naturally in or near the cave and were therefore likely imports into the site), and unmodified slabs of quartzite and quartzitic sandstone, some associated with hearths.

==== Other artefacts ====
artefacts in a variety of materials were found at Melkhoutboom and, like lithics, they have been analysed as evidence of the activities that may have taken place at the site. These non-lithic artefacts were analysed in conjunction with lithic material, since stone tools are often used to manufacture or modify artefacts made from other materials.

Wooden artefacts found at the site included fire sticks, which are well-known ethnographically in the Eastern Cape and have been found at other Eastern Cape sites; fire drill bits; pegs, possibly used as hangers as evidenced by the pegs found in the walls by Hewitt in 1930, or possibly used for staking down skins for leatherworking; points, which were found in a range of sizes and shapes with no apparent single function; two possible handles for hafting stone tools, based on areas stained with dark resin; and other wooden artefacts that were broken or incomplete or whose function could not be determined. The wooden artefacts in the Melkhoutboom sequence are comparable to those from Gwisho sites in Zambia, dating to 4000 BP, as well as to those made by present-day Bushmen of the Kalahari Desert.

In addition to standard wood artefacts, many cut lengths of reed were recovered from the higher sequences. These are thought to have played an important role in making the composite tools characteristic of the Wilton Industry, and some may also have been used as arrow shafts.

Several pieces of cord made from plant material were also found, along with a few small pieces of netting made from the same type of cord. The netting appears too fine to have been used for hunting and fishing, and is thought to have been used to transport plant waste; this interpretation is supported by ethnography, and by the fact that the netting was found in association with plant waste.

Shell artefacts and fragments were found in almost every unit of the site, and were well preserved except in the very lowest units. Most of the shell pieces found were fragments, but decoration could be seen on some of the ostrich eggshell pieces, and unidentified marine shells were used to make the beads found in one of the burials. All of the marine shell found, including those from sea snails (found in all except the Basal unit, which corresponds to the late Pleistocene and lower sea level) and clams (found in much lower frequency), was imported to the site, likely for ornamental use. Ostrich eggshell and land snail shell fragments were found throughout all levels, and freshwater mussel shells were found in upper levels.

Compared to the numbers of wood and shell artefacts, there were far fewer bone artefacts found. Only a single ornamental item made of bone was found – a lynx vertebra with holes drilled in it, possibly for cord to be strung through, and colouration from red ochre. The rest of the bone artefacts found were tools: one spatula-like tool, four pointed tools, and a few small flakes of bone.

A small amount of pottery was found on the surface level, as well as a few small deposits in some of the pits that were discovered. The few rim sherds that were found appear to have come from pots and bowls. On the few decorated pieces found, the decoration consisted of simple dotting or incisions, comparable to pottery found at Scott's Cave and in some of the coastal middens.

Additionally, a few leather artefacts were found in the main bedding. Only one fully reconstructible garment was found: a pull-through made of grysbok (antelope) leather, similar to those worn by present-day hunter-gatherer groups in South Africa. The remaining leather artefacts were small pieces of skin, some sewn, mostly from small antelope.

=== Plant and animal remains ===
Based on the plant remains recovered from Melkhoutboom Cave, the primary plant foods its inhabitants relied on were the corms of lilies, especially bugle lilies, and cape tulips. These corms were the main edible plant remains found, suggesting that plants with underground storage organs – and therefore nearly year-long availability – were given preference in collecting. In addition to these important plants, remains of wood sorrel, boophone, and star lily were found in samples from most levels. Wood sorrel is thought likely to have been used for medicinal purposes, and boophone leaves possibly as wrapping material or for arrow poison.

Animal bones were found in all layers, but were better preserved in the higher layers. The faunal remains found for the most part belonged to species currently found in the region such as bushpig, grysbok, bushbuck, and duiker, all of which require or prefer a habitat with dense vegetation. Faunal remains of some species from nearby areas, including Kudu, rooi ribbok, vaal ribbok, cape buffalo, baboon, and vervet monkey; and some extinct species, including blue antelope and mountain zebra, were also found. The faunal remains as a whole are indicative of a hunting pattern that has been associated with the tools of the Wilton Industry – the hunting of smaller, nocturnal, non-herd animals such as grysbok, bushbuck, and kudu, which appear to have been the main prey of the residents of Melkhoutboom. It is thought that such a pattern might indicate hunting with snares rather than with spears or other projectiles.

== Interpretations ==
Melkhoutboom Cave is considered a three-component site, with each of the components being the product of several different occupations, sometimes separated by several thousand years.

The 1967 and 1969 excavations were intended to investigate the ways artefact styles and methods of production changed through time in the Eastern Cape, with special attention paid to the hafted tools of the Wilson Industry. The research was also more broadly intended to shed light on the prehistory of the Eastern Cape region, specifically on the changes that occurred – climatic, environmental, social, and technological – during the transition from the late Upper Pleistocene to the Holocene.

Based on the findings at Melkhoutboom, several conclusions have been drawn. The plant and animal remains in the Melkhoutboom sequence have been used to make inferences about the environment of the Eastern Cape region during the terminal Pleistocene and Holocene occupations of the cave. There are noticeable differences between the faunal remains found in the units corresponding to the Wilton Industry and the underlying units. In the lower levels, the primary species represented in the faunal record are zebra, hartebeest, and wildebeest, which are all diurnal herd animals and grazers preferring a grassland environment. In the Wilton Base Marker and overlying units, the faunal remains are primarily of nocturnal, non-herding animals that generally prefer a more vegetated environment. This change is thought to represent and correspond to a decrease in grassland and increase in scrub and brush that began in the terminal Pleistocene and continued into the Holocene. It is unknown whether this environmental change occurred as a result of human activity, but it is thought to be a natural occurrence that may have been reinforced by human activity.

The principal conclusion of the “Prehistory of the Eastern Cape” study is that there appears to be evidence for a stable human population in the Eastern Cape, or at least in the eastern zone of the Cape Folded Mountain Belt, from at least 15,000 years ago. Even though the sequence at Melkhoutboom shows up to several thousand years of non-occupation at a time interspersed with the periods of occupation represented by the material culture, it is expected for periodic occupation to be the norm even with a stable population based on studies of other current and past hunter-gatherer groups. This conclusion is supported by the fact that similar sequences representing alternating periods of occupation and non-occupation occur at a number of other caves in the area. The interpretation that occupation goes back to at least 15,000 years BP is supported by radiocarbon dating of the hearth found on the bedrock, as well as of some artefacts, animal bone, and carbonized plant remains found in the overlying Basal Unit.

Other conclusions that have been made based on the findings at Melkhoutboom concern the population itself. Based on the floral and faunal remains, lithics, and other artefacts found in the Wilton Base Marker Unit and above, inferences can be made about changes in subsistence strategies and technology that took place during the 15,000 years represented by the Melkhoutboom sequence. The appearance of the Wilton Industry as well as the changes in plant and animal remains both correspond to the aforementioned environmental changes that are thought to have taken place between the terminal Pleistocene and early Holocene. The floral and faunal evidence has been interpreted as indicating a change during this time period from a subsistence strategy more reliant on hunting to one more reliant on plant foods. This coupled with the shift in faunal remains toward nocturnal, solitary, territorial animals might also represent a change in hunting technology, from the bows and arrows used to hunt larger game to the use of some form of snare.

This change in subsistence appears to have had implications on social organization and lifestyle as well. The hunting of more territorial animals allows for more stable and sedentary living, with smaller territories. This change toward a subsistence strategy allowing for more stable living is also reflected in the changes in lithic technology to the microliths and hafted composite tools of the Wilton Industry about 7,500 years ago. The changes in non-lithic artefacts also show an increase in woodworking for both tools and personal ornamentation, the making of cords from plant fibres, and the making of leather garments, all of which can together be interpreted as showing a lower degree of specialization than in previous artefact sequences. The burials found in the Wilton Base Marker and overlying units, especially the burial in the Main Bedding Unit covered by a layer of red ochre, appear to show that these changes in lifestyle may have allowed for the development of ritual behaviour. Overall, the Melkhoutboom sequence has been interpreted as representing a transition in the Eastern Cape during the early Holocene to a more sedentary existence based on plant-based subsistence with some reliance on hunting smaller, territorial game, and a more standardized lithic technology, all of which may have been adaptations to the changing environment of the early Holocene.
