= Africactenus tridentatus =

Africa Ctenus Tropical Wolf Spider

Conservation status
- Least Concern (SANBI Red List)

Scientific classification
- Kingdom: Animalia
- Phylum: Arthropoda
- Subphylum: Chelicerata
- Class: Arachnida
- Order: Araneae
- Infraorder: Araneomorphae
- Family: Ctenidae
- Genus: Africactenus
- Species: A. tridentatus

Binomial name
- Africactenus tridentatus Hyatt, 1954

Species of spider

Africactenus tridentatus is a species of spider in the family Ctenidae. It is endemic to southern Africa and is commonly known as the Africa Ctenus tropical wolf spider.

== Distribution ==
Africactenus tridentatus is found in Zimbabwe and South Africa. In South Africa, the species has been recorded from two provinces: the Eastern Cape (including Jeffreys Bay and Addo Elephant National Park) and Mpumalanga (White River).

== Habitat and ecology ==
The species is a free-running ground dweller known from the Savanna and Fynbos biomes, at altitudes ranging from 16 to 874 m above sea level.

== Description ==
Africactenus tridentatus is known only from males. It belongs to the genus Africactenus, which is characterized by a deep dorsal indentation on the carapace, well-developed hair tufts on the dorsum of the opisthosoma, and the absence of terminal pairs of spines on tibiae I and II.

== Conservation ==
Africactenus tridentatus is listed as Least Concern by the South African National Biodiversity Institute due to its wide geographical range. The species receives protection in Addo Elephant National Park.

== Taxonomy ==
The species was originally described by K.H. Hyatt in 1954 from Mashonaland, Zimbabwe. It was later revised by Benoit in 1974.
