= Sunday's River Valley Local Municipality elections =

Local elections in the Eastern Cape, South Africa

The Sunday's River Valley Local Municipality council consists of sixteen members elected by mixed-member proportional representation. Eight councillors are elected by first-past-the-post voting in eight wards, while the remaining eight are chosen from party lists so that the total number of party representatives is proportional to the number of votes received.

In the election of 4 November 2026 the African National Congress (ANC) won a plurality of eight seats.

== Results ==
The following table shows the composition of the council after past elections.

Event	ANC	DA	EFF	Other	Total
2000 election	11	2	—	—	13
2006 election	12	2	—	0	14
2011 election	12	3	—	1	16
2016 election	11	4	1	0	16
2021 election	10	4	1	1	16
2026 election	8	4	1	3	16

== December 2000 election ==
The following table shows the results of the 2000 election.

Party	Ward			List			Total seats
Party	Votes	%	Seats	Votes	%	Seats	Total seats
African National Congress	8,607	83.39	7	10,069	83.81	4	11
Democratic Alliance	1,715	16.61	0	1,945	16.19	2	2
Total	10,322	100.00	7	12,014	100.00	6	13
Valid votes	10,322	98.38		12,014	98.23		
Invalid/blank votes	170	1.62		217	1.77		
Total votes	10,492	100.00		12,231	100.00		
Registered voters/turnout	20,273	51.75		20,273	60.33		

== March 2006 election ==
The following table shows the results of the 2006 election.

Party	Ward			List			Total seats
Party	Votes	%	Seats	Votes	%	Seats	Total seats
African National Congress	12,153	87.14	7	12,092	86.99	5	12
Democratic Alliance	1,444	10.35	0	1,374	9.88	2	2
Pan Africanist Congress of Azania	284	2.04	0	309	2.22	0	0
United Democratic Movement	66	0.47	0	125	0.90	0	0
Total	13,947	100.00	7	13,900	100.00	7	14
Valid votes	13,947	98.38		13,900	98.18		
Invalid/blank votes	230	1.62		258	1.82		
Total votes	14,177	100.00		14,158	100.00		
Registered voters/turnout	23,575	60.14		23,575	60.06		

== May 2011 election ==
The following table shows the results of the 2011 election.

Party	Ward			List			Total seats
Party	Votes	%	Seats	Votes	%	Seats	Total seats
African National Congress	10,898	68.43	6	11,923	78.55	6	12
Democratic Alliance	2,805	17.61	1	3,256	21.45	2	3
Independent candidates	2,223	13.96	1				1
Total	15,926	100.00	8	15,179	100.00	8	16
Valid votes	15,926	97.79		15,179	92.51		
Invalid/blank votes	360	2.21		1,229	7.49		
Total votes	16,286	100.00		16,408	100.00		
Registered voters/turnout	25,366	64.20		25,366	64.69		

== August 2016 election ==
The following table shows the results of the 2016 election.

Party	Ward			List			Total seats
Party	Votes	%	Seats	Votes	%	Seats	Total seats
African National Congress	10,540	71.55	7	10,478	71.17	4	11
Democratic Alliance	3,189	21.65	1	3,206	21.78	3	4
Economic Freedom Fighters	758	5.15	0	727	4.94	1	1
Pan Africanist Congress of Azania	243	1.65	0	236	1.60	0	0
United Democratic Movement				76	0.52	0	0
Total	14,730	100.00	8	14,723	100.00	8	16
Valid votes	14,730	98.86		14,723	98.77		
Invalid/blank votes	170	1.14		183	1.23		
Total votes	14,900	100.00		14,906	100.00		
Registered voters/turnout	25,839	57.66		25,839	57.69		

== November 2021 election ==
The following table shows the results of the 2021 election.

Party	Ward			List			Total seats
Party	Votes	%	Seats	Votes	%	Seats	Total seats
African National Congress	7,179	63.20	7	7,258	63.83	3	10
Democratic Alliance	2,456	21.62	1	2,471	21.73	3	4
Economic Freedom Fighters	631	5.56	0	647	5.69	1	1
Good	241	2.12	0	582	5.12	1	1
Freedom Front Plus	254	2.24	0	264	2.32	0	0
Independent candidates	509	4.48	0				0
African Transformation Movement	49	0.43	0	85	0.75	0	0
Compatriots of South Africa	40	0.35	0	64	0.56	0	0
Total	11,359	100.00	8	11,371	100.00	8	16
Valid votes	11,359	97.96		11,371	97.94		
Invalid/blank votes	236	2.04		239	2.06		
Total votes	11,595	100.00		11,610	100.00		
Registered voters/turnout	25,034	46.32		25,034	46.38		

== November 2026 election ==
The following table shows the results of the 2026 election.

Party	Ward			List			Total seats
Party	Votes	%	Seats	Votes	%	Seats	Total seats
African National Congress	6,942	51.18	7	6,989	51.46	1	8
Democratic Alliance	2,977	21.95	1	2,984	21.97	3	4
Pan Africanist Congress of Azania	1,063	7.84	0	1,055	7.77	1	1
Patriotic Alliance	940	6.93	0	951	7.00	1	1
Economic Freedom Fighters	675	4.98	0	673	4.96	1	1
South African Communist Party	523	3.86	0	457	3.36	1	1
Freedom Front Plus	277	2.04	0	280	2.06	0	0
uMkhonto weSizwe Party	65	0.48	0	67	0.49	0	0
Good	65	0.48	0	63	0.46	0	0
African Transformation Movement	17	0.13	0	48	0.35	0	0
Afrika Mayibuye Movement	21	0.15	0	14	0.10	0	0
Total	13,565	100.00	8	13,581	100.00	8	16
Valid votes	13,565	98.54		13,581	98.33		
Invalid/blank votes	201	1.46		231	1.67		
Total votes	13,766	100.00		13,812	100.00		
Registered voters/turnout	27,339	50.35		27,339	50.52		
