= Sundays River Valley =

Valley in the Eastern Cape, South Africa

Coordinates: 33°24′S 25°26′E

The Sundays River Valley is a low-lying area along the Sundays River. It forms part of the Sunday's River Valley Local Municipality in Sarah Baartman District Municipality, Eastern Cape, South Africa.

The valley stretches from the Kirkwood prison grounds in the west to Colchester and Kinkelbos in the southeast. It is characterized by high-intensity agricultural activities (in particular the production of citrus fruits) and a well-developed irrigation system. In addition to citrus cultivation, various tourist attractions, bed and breakfast facilities, packing sheds and game-related tourist facilities are present throughout the valley.

The main urban settlement in the valley is Kirkwood. It also contains Enon, Colchester, Bersheba and Addo. Smaller settlements include Sunlands and Kinkelbos.

The Sundays River Valley irrigation scheme was started in the early 1920s, targeting British settlers on small holdings (10 morgen in size) along the banks of the Sundays River. A large dam was constructed on the Sundays River (Lake Mentz) to supply the area with water for irrigation, and a canal system was put in place to supply water to farms from Kirkwood, at the upper end of the valley, to Addo at the lower end. The driving force of this development was Sir Percy Fitzpatrick.

This area is now one of the key production areas for citrus in South Africa.
