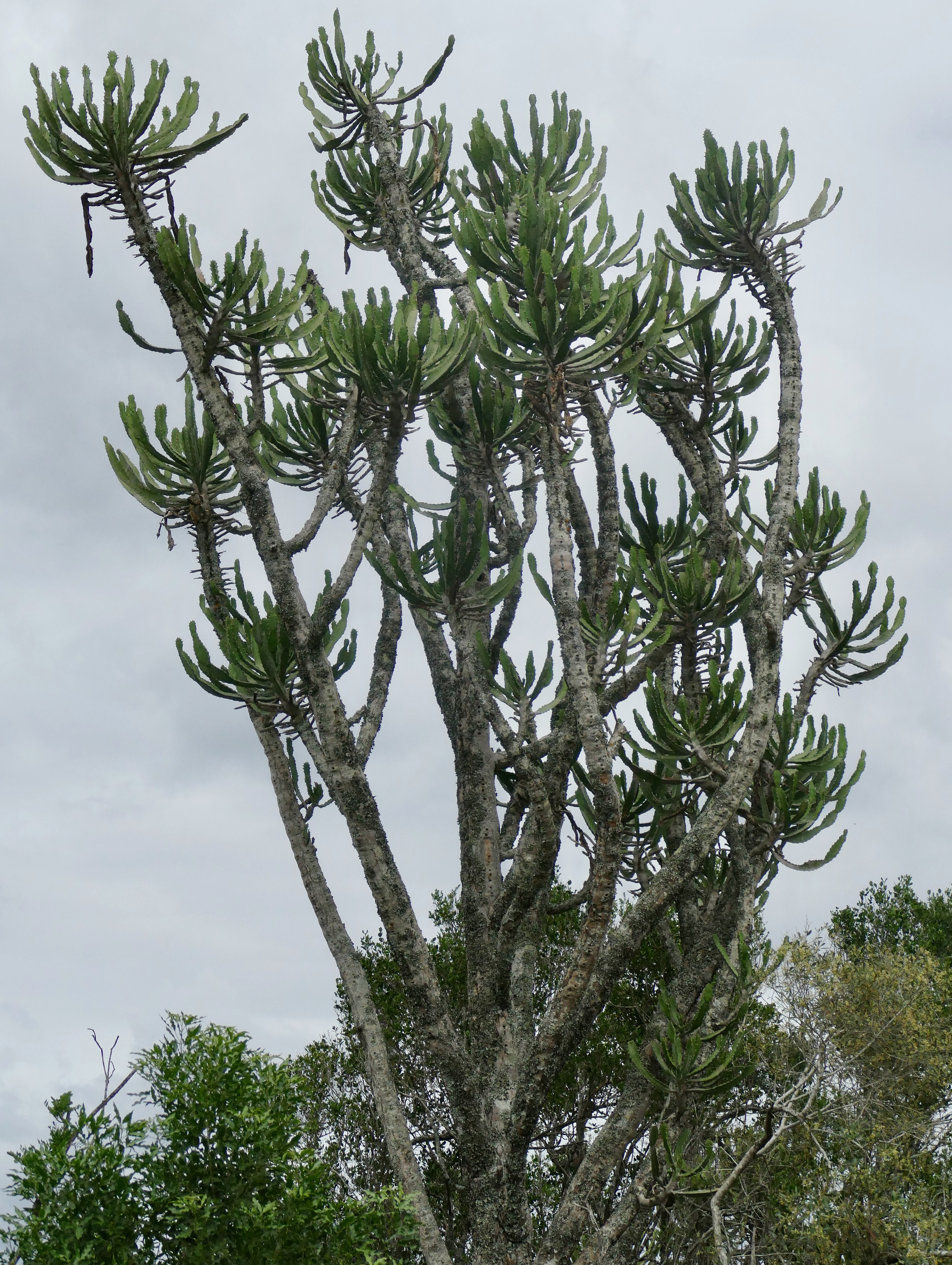
- E. triangularis in the Addo Elephant National Park
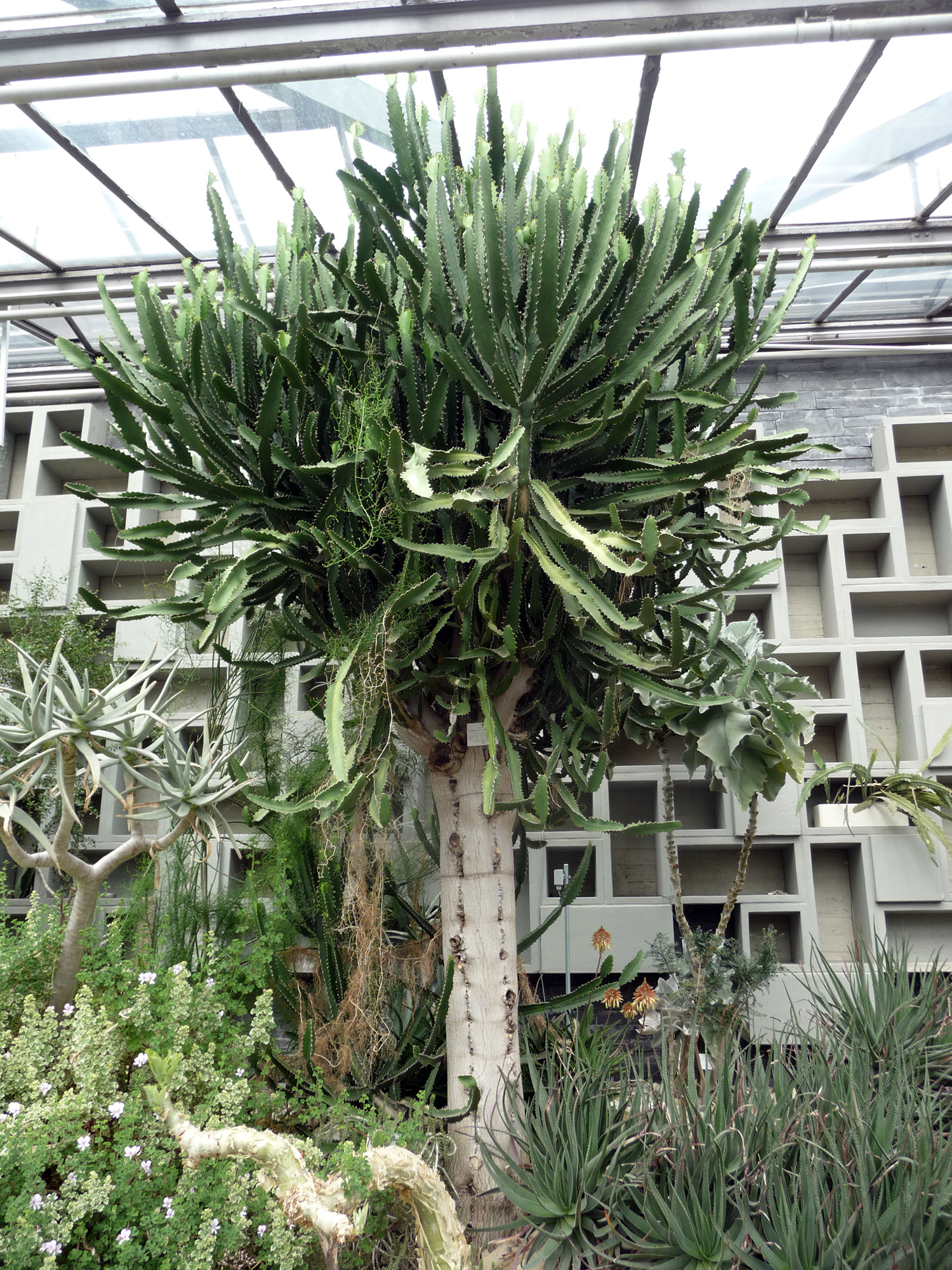

Scientific classification
- Kingdom: Plantae
- Clade: Tracheophytes
- Clade: Angiosperms
- Clade: Eudicots
- Clade: Rosids
- Order: Malpighiales
- Family: Euphorbiaceae
- Genus: Euphorbia
- Species: E. triangularis

Binomial name
- Euphorbia triangularis Desf. ex A.Berger

= Euphorbia triangularis =

Species of succulent plant found in southern Africa

Euphorbia triangularis, commonly known as river naboom, river euphorbia, chandelier-tree or tree euphorbia, is a species of plant in the family Euphorbiaceae native to southern Africa.
