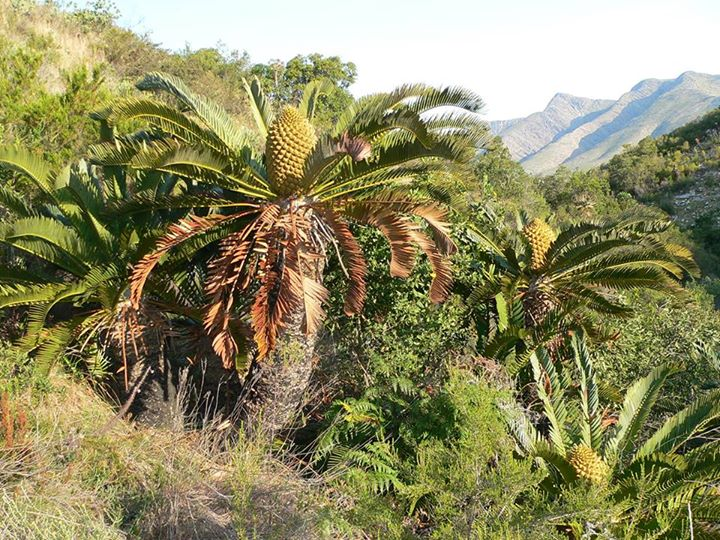
- Female specimens in the Suurberg

Conservation status
- Near Threatened (IUCN 3.1)
- CITES Appendix I

Scientific classification
- Kingdom: Plantae
- Clade: Tracheophytes
- Clade: Gymnospermae
- Division: Cycadophyta
- Class: Cycadopsida
- Order: Cycadales
- Family: Zamiaceae
- Genus: Encephalartos
- Species: E. longifolius

Binomial name
- Encephalartos longifolius (Jacq.) Lehm., 1834
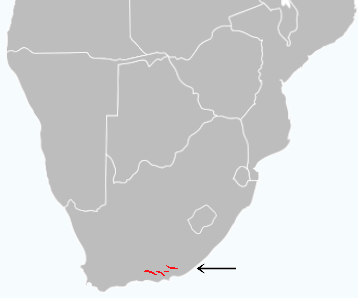
- range of species

Synonyms
- Encephalartos lanuginosus Jacqin; Encephalartos mauritianus Miq. Zamia lanuginosa Jacqin; Zamia longifolia Jacqin

= Encephalartos longifolius =

Thunberg's cycad

Species of cycad

Encephalartos longifolius is a low-growing palm-like cycad in the family Zamiaceae. It is endemic to South Africa and is commonly known as Thunberg's cycad, breadpalm or broodboom. This cycad is listed as near threatened in the IUCN Red List of Threatened Species.

== Description ==
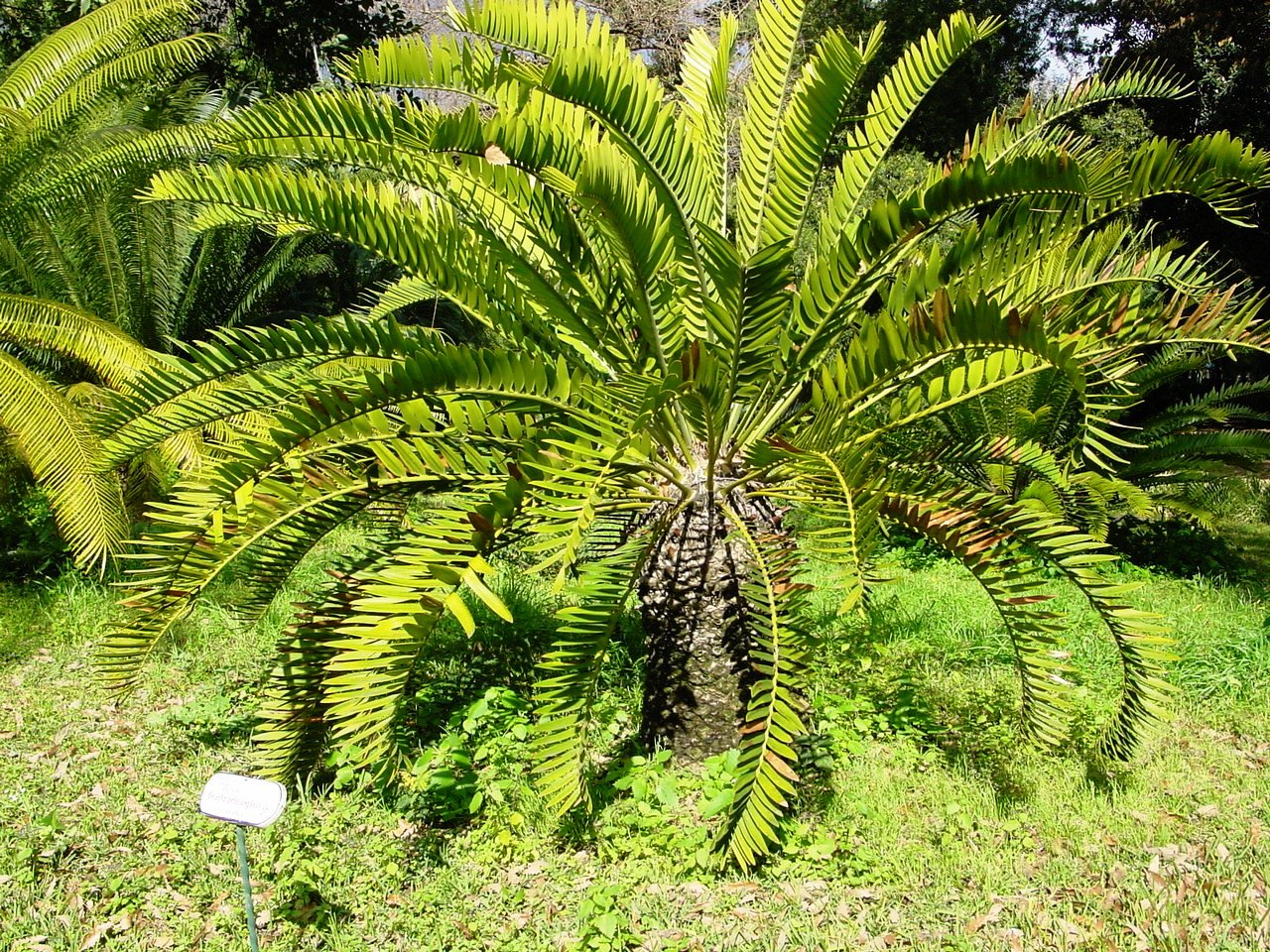
E. longifolius growing at the Orto botanico di Palermo

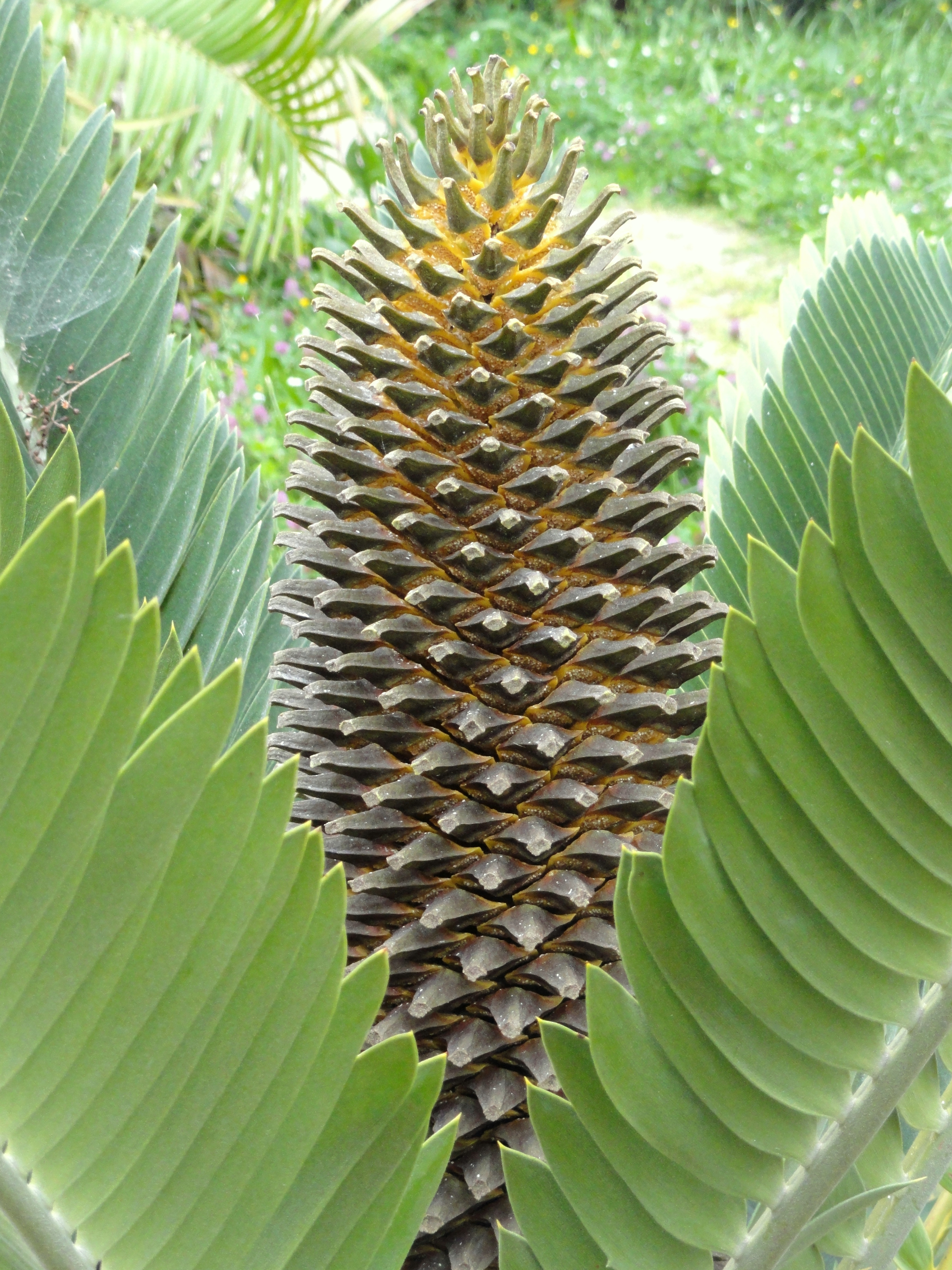
The male cone

The breadpalm grows up to three metres tall and develops a very thick trunk with age. This is crowned with dark or metallic green, semi-glossy, arching leaves up to two metres long and moderately keeled. The leaflets are lanceolate, overlapping upwards and have smooth margins. There are one to three green, ovoid male cones 40 to 60 centimetres long and 15 to 20 centimetres in diameter. This is the largest pollen cones in its genus. A similar number of green female cones are more robust with a diameter of up to forty centimetres. The seeds are red and can reach five centimetres long.

== Distribution ==
This species is found in coastal regions of Eastern Cape Province, South Africa growing at heights of up to six hundred metres. It grows in a variety of different habitats on the mountain ridges from west of Joubertina in the Kouga mountains east to near Grahamstown. There are a large number of locations where breadpalms grow but on the whole, populations are declining.

== Historical note ==
In their book on South African trees, published in 1972, Eve Palmer and Norah Pitman wrote:

This was the first cycad seen by the early colonists pushing eastwards. This was Thunberg's breadtree; and this species almost changed the course of South African history for its seeds nearly killed General Smuts and men of a Boer commando in the eastern Cape during the Anglo-Boer War. Colonel Deneys Reitz writes in his book Commando how Smuts and his men, camping on the Suurberg, were poisoned after eating the seeds of Encephalartos altensteinii. Botanists today know that Reitz mistook the species, and that it was Thunberg's breadtree that poisoned the party.
