= Sunday's River Valley Local Municipality =

Sundays River Valley Sondagsriviervallei
- Local municipality
- Seal

- Location in the Eastern Cape
- Coordinates: 33°25′S 25°27′E
- Country: South Africa
- Province: Eastern Cape
- District: Sarah Baartman
- Seat: Nqweba
- Wards: 8

Government
  - Type: Municipal council
  - Mayor: Nombulelo Bixa (ANC)
  - Speaker: Simphiwe Happyboy Rune (ANC)

Area
  - Total: 5,994 km^{2} (2,314 sq mi)

Population (2011)
  - Total: 54,504
  - Density: 9.093/km^{2} (23.55/sq mi)

Racial makeup (2011)
  - Black African: 71.8%
  - Coloured: 21.4%
  - Indian/Asian: 0.2%
  - White: 5.9%

First languages (2011)
  - Xhosa: 64.3%
  - Afrikaans: 28.0%
  - English: 3.4%
  - Other: 4.3%
- Time zone: UTC+2 (SAST)
- Municipal code: EC106

Sundays River Valley Municipality (Xhosa: uMasipala wase Sundays River Valley; Afrikaans: Sondagsriviervallei Munisipaliteit) is a local municipality within Sarah Baartman District Municipality, in the Eastern Cape province of South Africa. It has a total population of nearly 70,000 people. The municipality is one of the key production areas for citrus in South Africa. It also encompasses the Addo Elephant National Park and other significant areas of nature conservation.

== Main places ==
The 2001 census divided the municipality into the following main places:

Place	Code	Area (km^{2})	Population	Most spoken language
Addo Elephant National Park	20602	1.08	90	Xhosa
Addo	20601	3.21	1,752	Afrikaans
Barsheba	20603	0.61	517	Xhosa
Bontrug	20604	2.33	6,806	Xhosa
Enon	20605	0.40	782	Afrikaans
Kirkwood	20606	3.07	2,749	Afrikaans
KwaZenzele	20607	3.62	3,733	Xhosa
Nomathamsanqa	20608	1.53	9,266	Xhosa
Paterson	20609	0.22	671	Afrikaans
Remainder of the municipality	20610	3,491.83	15,218	Xhosa

== Politics ==
The municipal council consists of sixteen members elected by mixed-member proportional representation. Eight councillors are elected by first-past-the-post voting in eight wards, while the remaining eight are chosen from party lists so that the total number of party representatives is proportional to the number of votes received.

In the election of 4 November 2026 the African National Congress (ANC) won a plurality of eight seats.

The following table shows the results of the election.

Party	Ward			List			Total seats
Party	Votes	%	Seats	Votes	%	Seats	Total seats
African National Congress	6,942	51.18	7	6,989	51.46	1	8
Democratic Alliance	2,977	21.95	1	2,984	21.97	3	4
Pan Africanist Congress of Azania	1,063	7.84	0	1,055	7.77	1	1
Patriotic Alliance	940	6.93	0	951	7.00	1	1
Economic Freedom Fighters	675	4.98	0	673	4.96	1	1
South African Communist Party	523	3.86	0	457	3.36	1	1
5 other parties	445	3.28	0	472	3.48	0	0
Total	13,565	100.00	8	13,581	100.00	8	16
Valid votes	13,565	98.54		13,581	98.33		
Invalid/blank votes	201	1.46		231	1.67		
Total votes	13,766	100.00		13,812	100.00		
Registered voters/turnout	27,339	50.35		27,339	50.52		

== Geography and land use ==
The municipality derives its name from the 250 km (160 mi) long Sundays River, the fastest flowing river in South Africa. The river winds its way through the Zuurberg mountains and passes Nqweba in the fertile Sundays River Valley; it empties into the Indian Ocean at Algoa Bay near Gqeberha.

To the north of Nqweba lies the Rietberg mountain with the Uyepoort (Uye gateway) that provides passage to the Zuurberg mountains and the Greater Addo Elephant National Park. A panoramic view of Nqweba and the orange groves is visible from The Lookout. The Lookout is also known as a site where large dinosaur fossils have been dug up by archeologists. The first complete dinosaur fossil to be found in South Africa, nicknamed "Kirky," was found not far from Nqweba (Kirkwood).

The municipality comprises three regions with distinct characteristics:

- The coastal zone, between the mouth of the Sundays River and Alexandria, is predominantly characterised by reserves and conservation areas, which form part of the Greater Addo Park. No settlement occurs in the coastal zone; it is largely undeveloped and contains the Woody Cape Nature Reserve, the Alexandria Coastal Reserve and the Alexandria State Forest. The area is unique for its mobile dunes and unspoiled wilderness.
- The Sundays River Valley is characterized by wide, fertile flood plains, high-intensity agricultural activities (in particular the production of citrus fruits), and a well-developed irrigation system. In addition to citrus cultivation, various tourist attractions, bed and breakfast facilities, packing sheds and game-related tourist facilities are present throughout the valley. The town of Nqweba is the main focal point of the Valley, with Addo and Sunland as secondary nodes.
- The hinterlands, north and east of the Sundays River Valley, are characterised by high-lying mountainous areas with steep valleys and drainage features. This region includes the Addo Elephant National Park and Zuurberg Conservation areas, as well as the town of Paterson with the Shamwari Game Reserve.

== Demographics ==
The municipality's population (as of 2005) is 63% urban and 37% rural. 64% of the population are 34 years old or younger. Suggested unemployment rate figures range from 20% to 44%. In 2001, among persons older than 20 years, 5461 had had no schooling, 7642 had had some primary education, 2487 had completed primary school, another 6594 had had some secondary education, 2363 had finished Grade 12, and 827 had gone on to some higher level of schooling.

Among individual residents, 41.63% earned no income in 2001; 45.74% earned R800 or less per month; 6.96% earned between R801 and R1600 per month; 5.71% earned over R1600 per month.

Approximately half of the municipality's households live on less than R800 (US $110) per month.

== Economy ==
The agricultural industry, centering mainly around citrus fruit, dairy and chicory farming, plays a major role in the economy and functioning of the region; it alone counts for 31.2% of the GGP and 47.7% of employment.

Approximately 25% of South Africa’s navel oranges and 50% of the country’s lemons are produced in the Sunday’s River Valley. The area exports million of cartons of navel oranges per year, earning more than R1 billion in foreign exchange for the country. Other agricultural products include vegetables, potatoes, maize, wheat, chicory, flowers and rye grass.

Ecotourism is another driving force of the local economy, thanks to the presence of vast unspoiled wilderness areas. Addo receives about 115 000 visitors each year, of which 50% are foreign, and this figure is on the increase.
