= Africactenus =

Scientific classification
- Kingdom: Animalia
- Phylum: Arthropoda
- Subphylum: Chelicerata
- Class: Arachnida
- Order: Araneae
- Infraorder: Araneomorphae
- Family: Ctenidae
- Genus: Africactenus; Hyatt, 1954

Type species
- A. agilior (Pocock, 1900)

Species
- 21, see text

Genus of spiders

Africactenus is a genus of mostly African wandering spiders first described by K. H. Hyatt in 1954.

== Species ==
As of September 2025 it contains twenty species from Africa and one from India:

- Africactenus acteninus Benoit, 1974 – Congo
- Africactenus agilior (Pocock, 1900) (type) – West, Central Africa
- Africactenus decorosus (Arts, 1912) – Cameroon, Ivory Coast, Congo
- Africactenus depressus Hyatt, 1954 – Cameroon
- Africactenus evadens Steyn & Jocqué, 2003 – Ivory Coast, Guinea
- Africactenus fernandensis (Simon, 1910) – Equatorial Guinea (Bioko)
- Africactenus ghesquierei (Lessert, 1946) – Congo
- Africactenus giganteus Benoit, 1974 – Congo
- Africactenus guineensis (Simon, 1897) – Sierra Leone
- Africactenus kribiensis Hyatt, 1954 – Cameroon, Gabon
- Africactenus leleupi Benoit, 1975 – Congo
- Africactenus longurio (Simon, 1910) – West Africa
- Africactenus monitor Steyn & Jocqué, 2003 – Ivory Coast
- Africactenus pococki Hyatt, 1954 – Cameroon, Gabon
- Africactenus poecilus (Thorell, 1899) – Nigeria, Cameroon, Gabon
- Africactenus simoni Hyatt, 1954 – Cameroon
- Africactenus sladeni Hyatt, 1954 – Cameroon
- Africactenus tenuitarsis (Strand, 1908) – Cameroon
- Africactenus tridentatus Hyatt, 1954 – Zimbabwe, South Africa
- Africactenus trilateralis Hyatt, 1954 – Cameroon, Gabon
- Africactenus unumus Sankaran & Sebastian, 2018 – India
