= Colchester, South Africa =

Colchester
- Location within Eastern Cape Location within South Africa Location within Africa
- Coordinates: 33.683333°S 25.8°E
- Country: South Africa
- Province: Eastern Cape
- Municipality: Nelson Mandela Bay

Area
  - Total: 5.73 km^{2} (2.21 sq mi)

Population (2011)
  - Total: 2,073
  - Density: 362/km^{2} (937/sq mi)

Racial makeup (2011)
  - Black African: 41.8%
  - Coloured: 20.8%
  - Indian/Asian: 0.4%
  - White: 35.9%
  - Other: 1.2%

First languages (2011)
  - Afrikaans: 48.5%
  - Xhosa: 33.2%
  - English: 14.7%
  - Other: 3.6%
- Time zone: UTC+2 (SAST)
- Postal code (street): 6175
- PO box: 6001

Colchester is a town in the Eastern Cape province of South Africa. It forms part of the Nelson Mandela Bay Metropolitan Municipality which governs Gqeberha and surrounding towns and suburbs.

== Geography ==
The small town of Colchester lies about 40 kilometres north-east of Gqeberha. It also lies on the N2 about 20 minutes from Gqeberha and an hour from Makhanda.

It lies on the banks of the Sundays River and the south-eastern border of the Sundays River Valley region.
