= Addo, South Africa =

Addo
- Location within Eastern Cape Location within South Africa
- Coordinates: 33.567°S 25.683°E
- Country: South Africa
- Province: Eastern Cape
- District: Sarah Baartman
- Municipality: Sundays River Valley

Area
  - Total: 4.3 km^{2} (1.7 sq mi)

Population (2011)
  - Total: 16,935
  - Density: 3,900/km^{2} (10,000/sq mi)

Racial makeup (2011)
  - Black African: 82.0%
  - Coloured: 16.0%
  - Indian/Asian: 0.1%
  - White: 1.0%
  - Other: 0.9%

First languages (2011)
  - Xhosa: 75.3%
  - Afrikaans: 18.9%
  - English: 2.6%
  - Other: 3.2%
- Time zone: UTC+2 (SAST)
- Postal code (street): 6105
- PO box: 6105
- Area code: 042

Addo is a town in Sarah Baartman District Municipality in the Eastern Cape province of South Africa. It is located in a region east of the Sundays River, some 72 km northeast of Gqeberha. In 1931 about 680 hectares (1,700 acres) were enclosed to form the Addo Elephant National Park. The name is also borne by a railway station, post office and bridge. Of Khoekhoen origin, the name probably means 'euphorbia ravine'.
