= Enon, South Africa =

Enon
- Location within Eastern Cape Location within South Africa
- Coordinates: 33.398°S 25.545°E
- Country: South Africa
- Province: Eastern Cape
- District: Sarah Baartman
- Municipality: Sundays River Valley

Area
  - Total: 1.4 km^{2} (0.54 sq mi)

Population (2011)
  - Total: 2,160
  - Density: 1,500/km^{2} (4,000/sq mi)

Racial makeup (2011)
  - Black African: 47.3%
  - Coloured: 51.9%
  - Indian/Asian: 0.1%
  - Other: 0.7%

First languages (2011)
  - Afrikaans: 52.1%
  - Xhosa: 43.6%
  - English: 1.5%
  - Other: 2.8%
- Time zone: UTC+2 (SAST)
- Postal code (street): 6125
- PO box: 6125

Enon is a small town in the Eastern Cape in South Africa. It is named after the biblical place mentioned in John 3:23 It lies 13 kilometres (8.1 mi) east of Kirkwood and 60 kilometres (37 mi) north-east of Uitenhage.

Enon (formerly known as Witterivier) was formed in 1818 by the Moravian Missionary Society on request of the Area Landdrost Jacob Glen Cuyler, to serve as a buffer between the Xhosa, Tembu and Fingo tribes living outside the Cape Colony and the European farmers and towns inside the Cape Colony. The land was granted to the Missionary Society in trust, to be administrated on behalf of the Cape Colony in the interests of residents of the missionary station.

Within the first 35 years of its inception it was caught in the middle of three Cape Frontier Wars and the First Anglo-Boer War, and has been evacuated on three occasions.

Enon is referred to in the 1840s by James Backhouse in his diary.

In 1909 control of the town was ceded back to the Union of South Africa. The governance of Enon currently falls under the Sundays River Valley Local Municipality.

== Bibliography ==
- Temmers, E. M., ed. (1987). Enon, Woonplek Van 'n Moedige Volk: Die Geskiedenis Van Enon 1818-1978 (in Afrikaans). Genadendalse Boekdrukkery.
- de Boer, Jacob; Temmers, E. M. (1987). The Unitas Fratrum: two hundred and fifty years of missionary and pastoral service in Southern Africa (Western Region). Moravian Church in S.A.W.C.P. ISBN 978-0-620-10974-1.
- Raper, P. E. (1989). Dictionary of Southern African Place Names. Jonathan Ball Publishers. p. 155. ISBN 978-0-947464-04-2.
