= Sundays River =

River in the Eastern Cape, South Africa

!Khukaǁgamma Sundays River Sondagsrivier
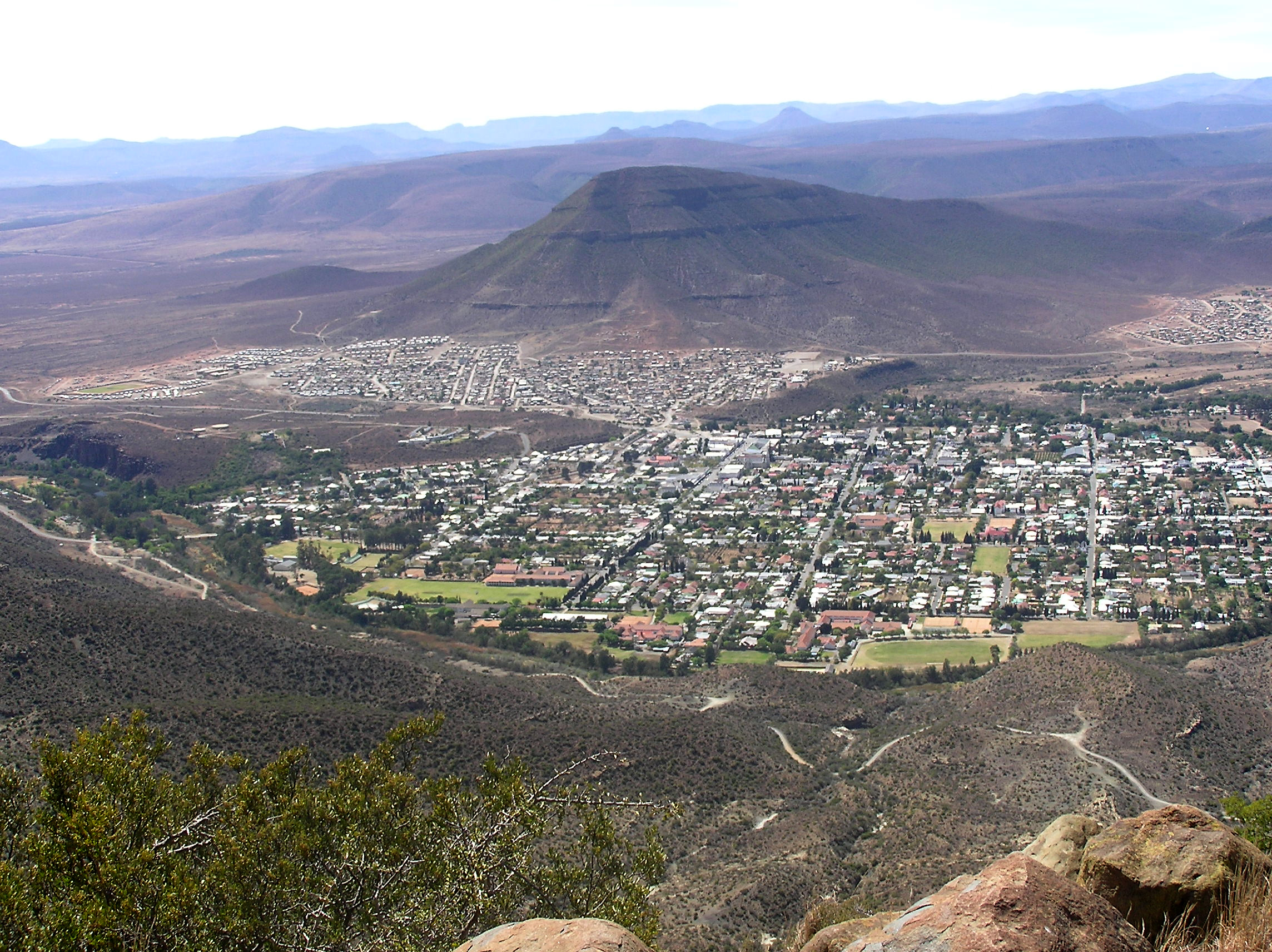

- Location of the Sunday River's mouth

Location
- Country: South Africa
- Region: Eastern Cape

Physical characteristics
- Source: Sneeuberge
- Mouth: Indian Ocean
  - location: Algoa Bay
  - coordinates: 33°42′53″S 25°50′54″E
- Length: 250 km (160 mi)

The !Khukaǁgamma or Sundays River (Afrikaans: Sondagsrivier) is a river in the Eastern Cape Province of South Africa. It is said to be the fastest flowing river in the country. The Inqua people, a Khoekhoe subgroup who historically were the wealthiest group in Southern Africa, originally named this river !Khukaǁgamma, 'the waters with the spirit of abundance' because the river's banks are always green and grassy despite the arid terrain that it runs through.

Presently this river is part of the Fish to Tsitsikamma Water Management Area.

== Course ==
The source of the 250 kilometres (160 mi) long Sundays River is in the Sneeuberge (the highest mountain range in the former Cape Province) near Nieu-Bethesda. The river then flows in a general South/Southeasterly direction, passing the town Graaff-Reinet in the Karoo before winding its way through the Zuurberg Mountains and then past Kirkwood and Addo in the fertile Sundays River Valley. It empties into the Indian Ocean at Algoa Bay after flowing through the village of Colchester, 40 km east of the city of Gqeberha.

Dams

- Darlington Dam in the Addo Elephant National Park
- Nqweba Dam in the Camdeboo National Park in Graaff-Reinet

== Fish-Sundays River Canal Scheme ==
The Fish River-Sundays River Canal Scheme consists of a canal and tunnel system which supplies water from the Orange River to the Great Fish River Valley and subsequently to the Sundays River Valley in order to supplement the existing water supply of the Eastern Cape. Since 1992 the water from the Sundays River Valley has been supplied to Gqeberha.

== See also ==
- List of rivers in South Africa
