= Paterson, South Africa =

Paterson
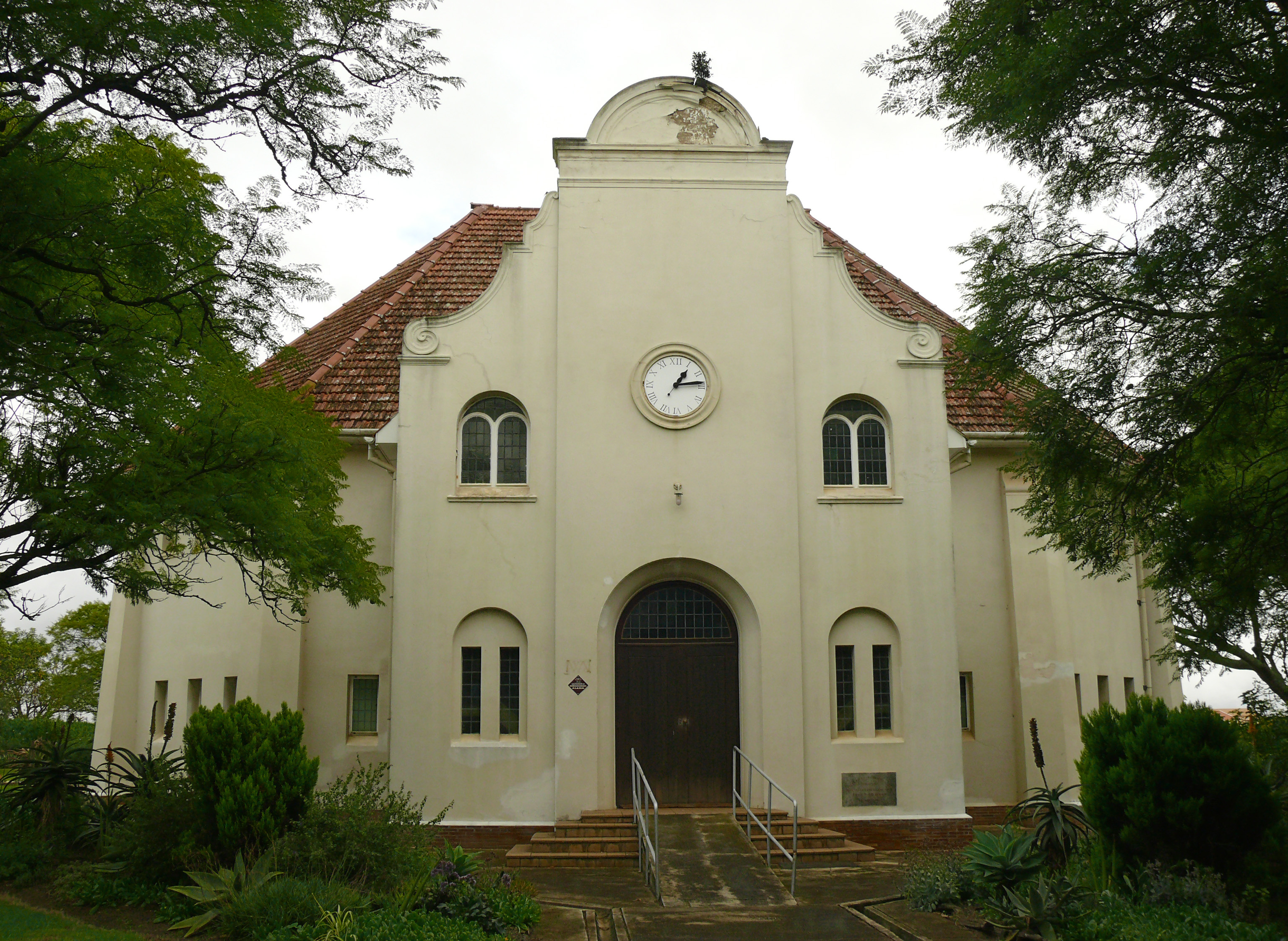
- Dutch Reformed Church in Paterson

- Location within Eastern Cape Location within South Africa
- Coordinates: 33.4394°S 25.9685°E
- Country: South Africa
- Province: Eastern Cape
- District: Sarah Baartman
- Municipality: Sundays River Valley

Area
  - Total: 4.3 km^{2} (1.7 sq mi)

Population (2011)
  - Total: 5,582
  - Density: 1,300/km^{2} (3,400/sq mi)

Racial makeup (2011)
  - Black African: 77.0%
  - Coloured: 20.4%
  - Indian/Asian: 0.3%
  - White: 1.5%
  - Other: 0.8%

First languages (2011)
  - Xhosa: 66.7%
  - Afrikaans: 23.2%
  - English: 5.9%
  - Sign language: 1.8%
  - Other: 2.3%
- Time zone: UTC+2 (SAST)
- Postal code (street): 6130
- PO box: 6130
- Area code: 042

Paterson is a settlement in Sarah Baartman District Municipality in the Eastern Cape province of South Africa. The town is located some 80 kilometres (50 miles) north-west of Alexandria and 21 kilometres (13 miles) north of Nanaga on the N10 National Route.

== Paterson village ==
The village was laid out in 1879 at Sand Flats railway station, which had been reached by the Midland System of the Cape Government Railways on 1 April 1876.

The new town was named after John Paterson (1822–1880), member of Parliament and founder of the Eastern Province Herald and of the Grey Institute for Boys, who established the town.

== Railway station ==
The first Paterson to become a railwayman was James, who joined the Cape Government Railways as a clerk at Port Elizabeth in 1882. After rising to many senior posts in the Operating department, South African Railways General Manager Sir William Hoy appointed him in June 1913 as Divisional Superintendent at Kimberley, where he retired in 1920.

Four generations and 180 cumulative years of Paterson railway service later, the fourth generation (and sixth member) of the Paterson family joined what was by then SA Transport Services in Johannesburg. During 1962, Sandflats railway station was eventually also named "Paterson".
