= Addo Elephant National Park =

Wildlife conservation park near Gqeberha in the Eastern Cape, South Africa

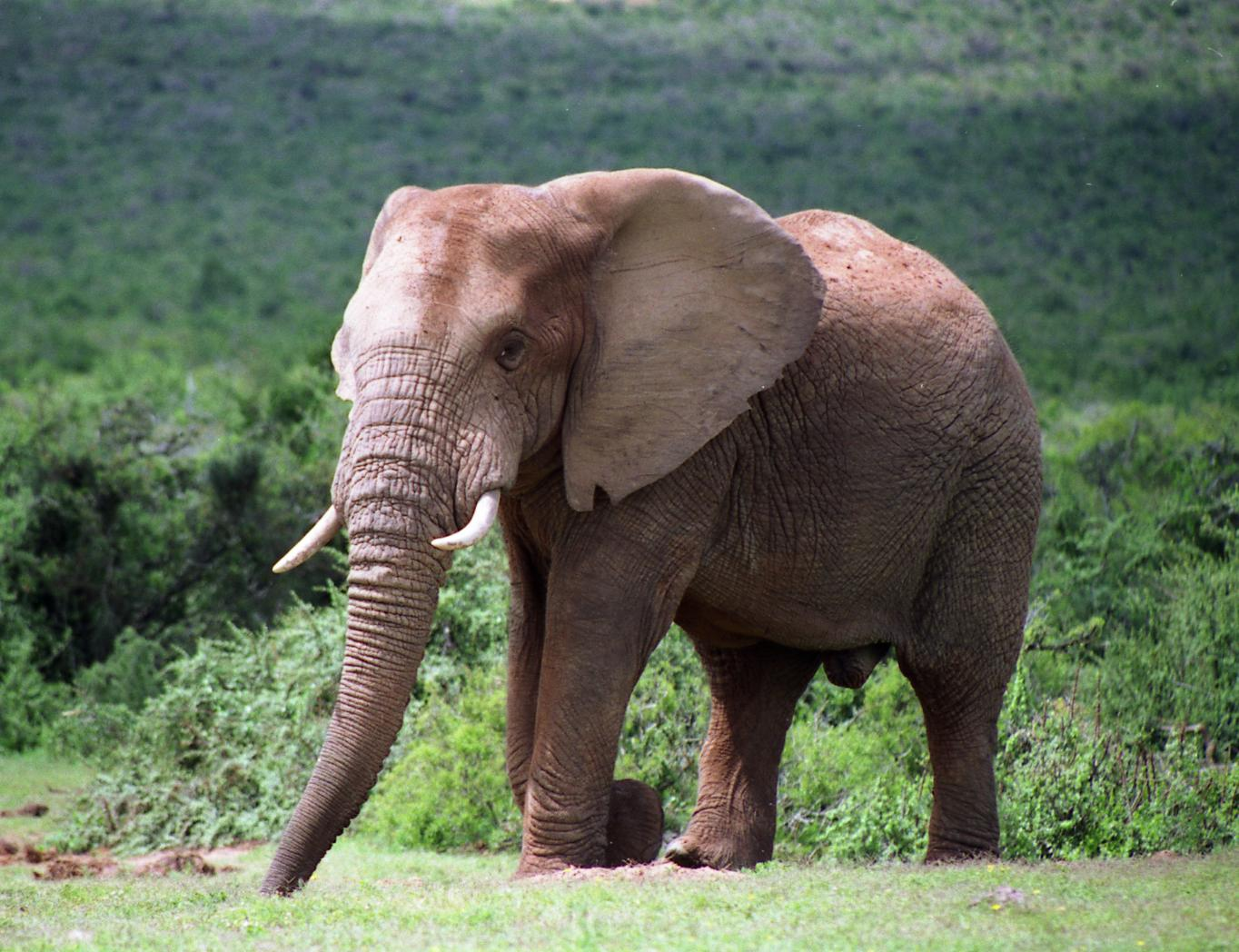
- Bull elephant at Addo

- Location within South Africa
- Interactive map of Addo Elephant National Park
- Location: Eastern Cape, South Africa
- Nearest city: Gqeberha
- Coordinates: 33°26′46″S 25°44′45″E
- Area: 1,640 km^{2} (630 sq mi)
- Established: 1931
- Governing body: South African National Parks
- Website: www.sanparks.org/parks/addo-elephant

Addo Elephant National Park (AENP) is a diverse wildlife conservation park situated close to Gqeberha in South Africa and is one of the country's 20 national parks. It currently ranks third in size after Kruger National Park and the Kgalagadi Transfrontier Park.

== History ==
The foundations of the Park lay in the near-extermination of the local elephant population. Local fruit farmers had been sold their farms at greatly reduced rates and favourable terms because of the elephant presence. Nevertheless, these farmers complained to the authorities about damage to their crops, broken water pipelines and reservoirs, and even loss of lives. From June 1919 to August 1920, the professional hunter Major P. J. Pretorius was brought in to thin out the herd, and shot a figure of "120-odd" elephants, reducing the population from about 130 to 16 individuals.

In 1925 Deneys Reitz, in his capacity as Minister for Lands, stepped in to proclaim the area a sanctuary. In the following years Reitz often stopped by to check in on the elephant population.

Following the passing of the Natural Parks Act in 1926, the Addo forest was formally established as a national park in 1931, in part due to the efforts of Sydney Skaife . The first Park manager, Stephen Harold Trollope (a former Kruger National Park ranger), chased elephants into the Park area using shotguns, firecrackers and fires. Only one bull remained outside the park and it was unfortunately shot by Trollope when it charged one of his men. This would have been the twelfth elephant in the park, leaving only 11.

Over the years the rangers struggled with the elephants' determination to leave the farm to raid neighbouring farms, eventually constructing a barrier made of mineshaft lift cable, and tramlines donated by the Port Elizabeth City Council and City of Johannesburg, which could withstand all but the biggest elephants.

By 1954 there were 22 elephant in the park, and in 1957 eland were introduced. In the 1990s, hippopotamus and rhino were introduced along with Burchell’s Zebra and warthog. Finally in 2003, six Kalahari lions were introduced to the park as were the first hyaenas. Today there are over 600 elephants in the Park.

=== Expansion ===
The original park has subsequently been expanded to include the Woody Cape Nature Reserve that extends from the Sundays River mouth towards Alexandria and a marine reserve, which includes St. Croix Island and Bird Island, both breeding habitat for gannets and penguins, as well as a large variety of other marine life. Bird Island is home to the world's largest breeding colony of gannets - about 120,000 birds - and also hosts the second largest breeding colony of African penguins, the largest breeding colony being St. Croix island. These marine assets form part of the plan to expand the 1,640 km^{2} (630 sq mi) Addo National Elephant Park into the 3,600 km^{2} (1,400 sq mi) Greater Addo Elephant National Park. The expanded park contains five of South Africa's seven major vegetation zones (biomes), and is also the only park to house Africa's "Big 7" (elephant, rhinoceros, lion, buffalo, leopard, whale and great white shark) in their natural habitat.

== Flora and fauna ==
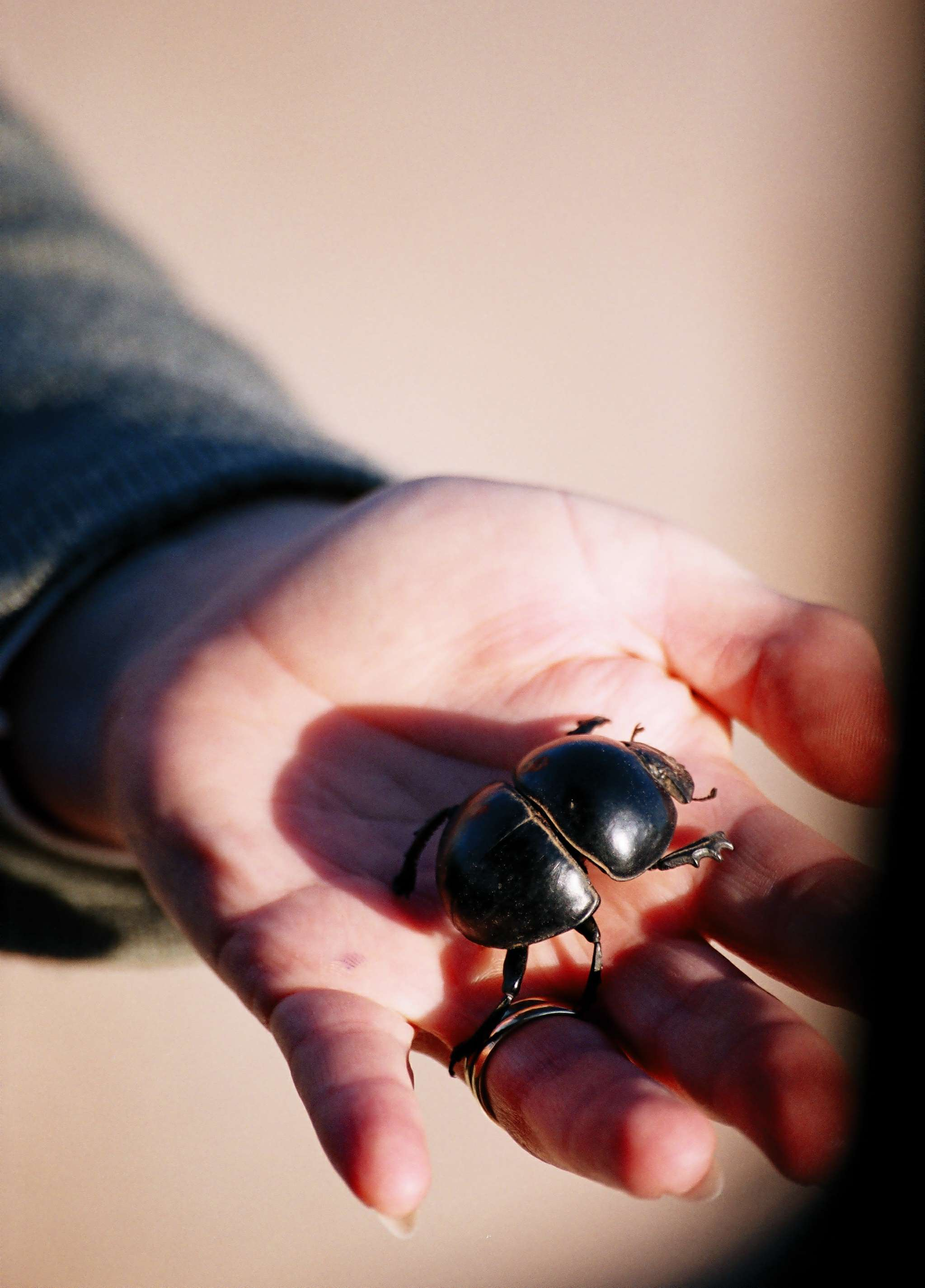
Flightless dung beetle

The flora within the AENP is quite varied, and like all plant life, is a central factor to the ecological system in place. Several species of rare and endemic plants, particularly succulent shrubs and geophytes are native to the South African region within the AENP. Many species are under environmental pressure, however, and are facing possible extinction.

The park is home to more than 600 elephants, 400 Cape buffaloes, over 48 endangered south-western black rhinoceros' (Diceros bicornis occidentalis) as well as a variety of antelope species. Lion and spotted hyena have also recently been re-introduced to the area. The largest remaining population of the flightless dung beetle (Circellium bacchus) is located within the park.

== Extinction and overpopulation ==
Two major environmental issues facing the AENP: extinction and overpopulation, which are interrelated. Since the AENP's original mission was to reintroduce certain megaherbivores, like the African bush elephant and eastern black rhinoceros, primary ecological efforts were made to preserve mammalian species. However, by overlooking the other contributors to this environmental chain, certain plant species have been subjected to overgrazing and trampling, mostly by the elephants of the park. This overgrazing and trampling not only destroys much of the plant life, but also forces it to adapt its physiology to stimuli that are not inherent to its evolutionary progress. Some biologists argue that it is not herbivorization alone that is threatening the flora, but a number of other ecological factors including zoochory and nutrient cycling. Up to 77 species of South African endemic plant species have been listed as "vulnerable to elephant browsing."

== Marine protected areas ==
The Addo Elephant National Park Marine Protected Area and Bird Island Marine Protected Area are associated with the park.

== Tourism ==
In 2018 the highest visitor count in the park's 87-year history was recorded. The park received 305,510 visitors between 1 April 2017 and 31 March 2018 (up from 265,585 in the previous year). International visitors make up 55% of this number, with German, Dutch and British nationals in the majority.

There is a main camp, featuring a swimming pool, restaurant, flood lit water hole and various accommodation, four other rest camps and four camps run by concessionaires. The main entrance as well as two looped tourist roads in the park are tarred while the others are graveled. There is also an additional access road through the southern block of the park feeding off the N2 highway near Colchester; it joins up with the existing tourist roads in the park.

== Gallery ==
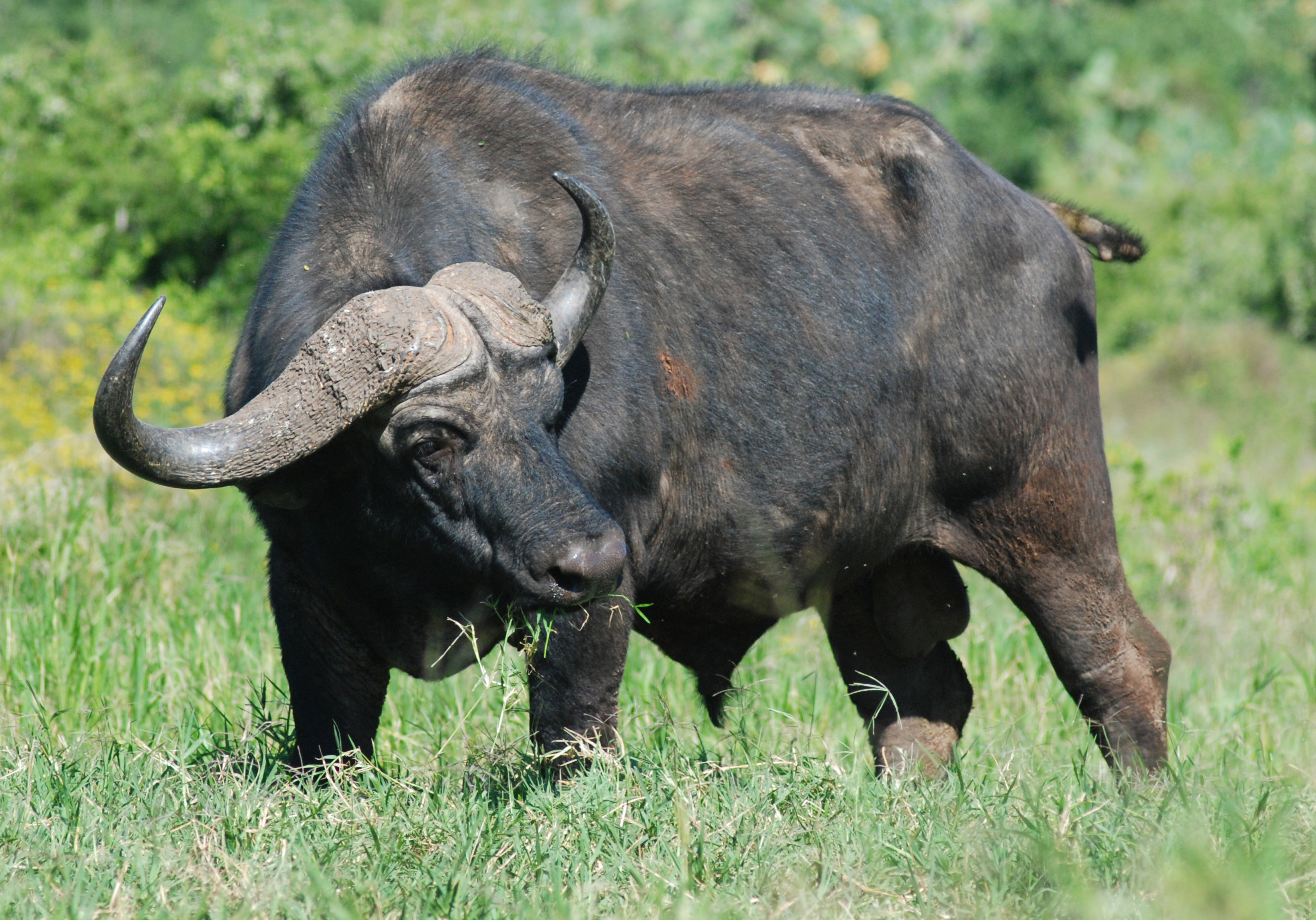
Cape Buffalo

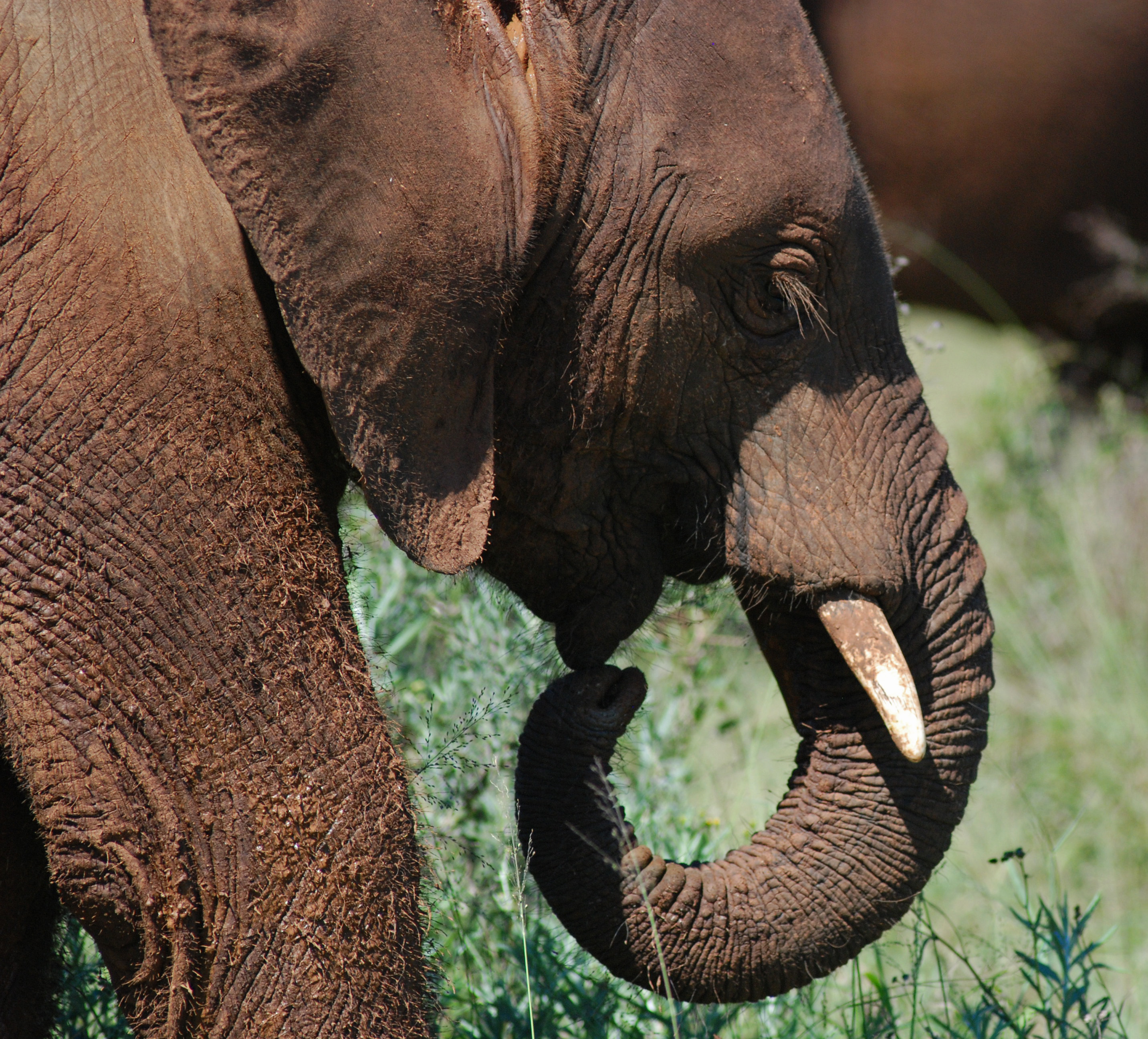
Elephant calf

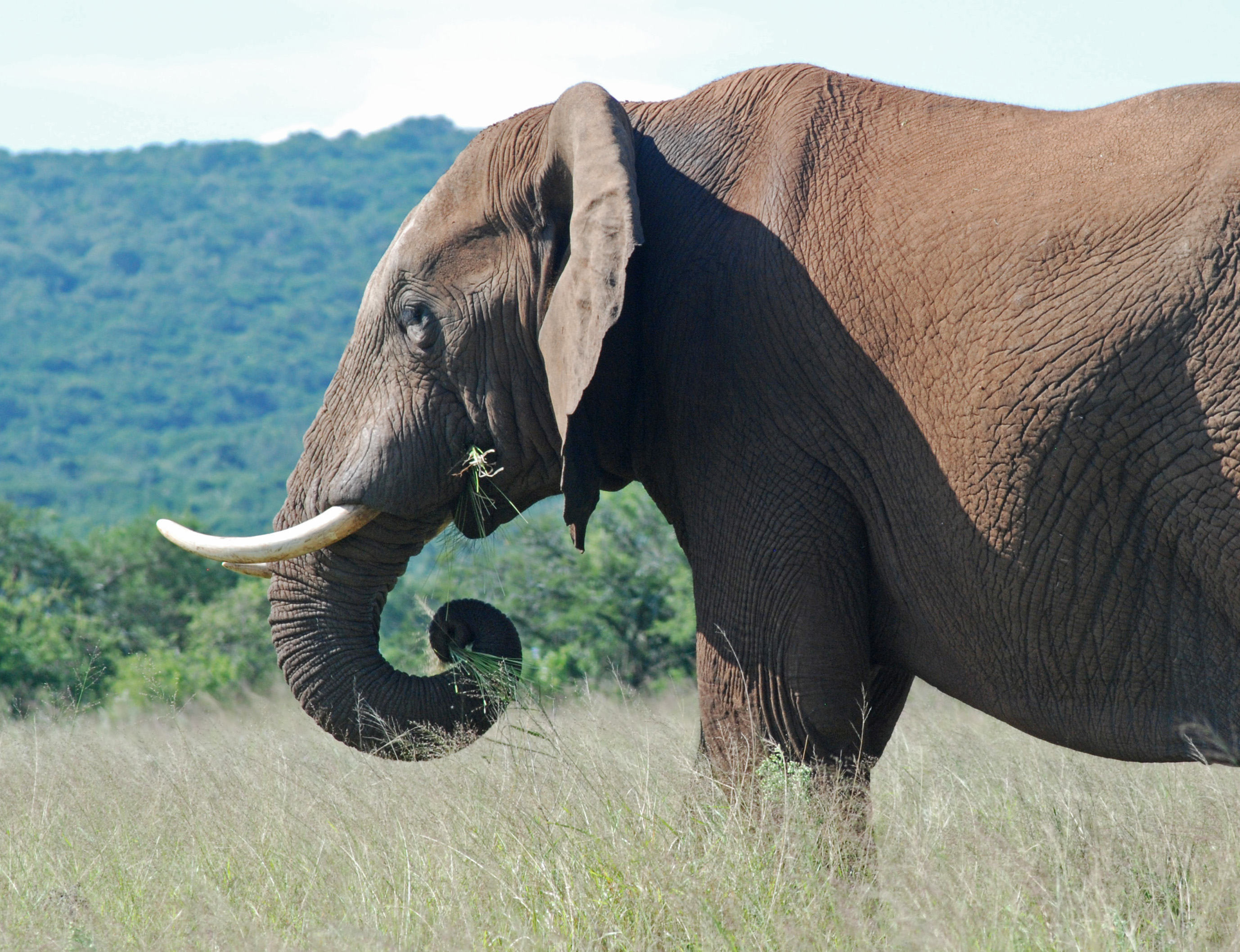
Elephant eating grass

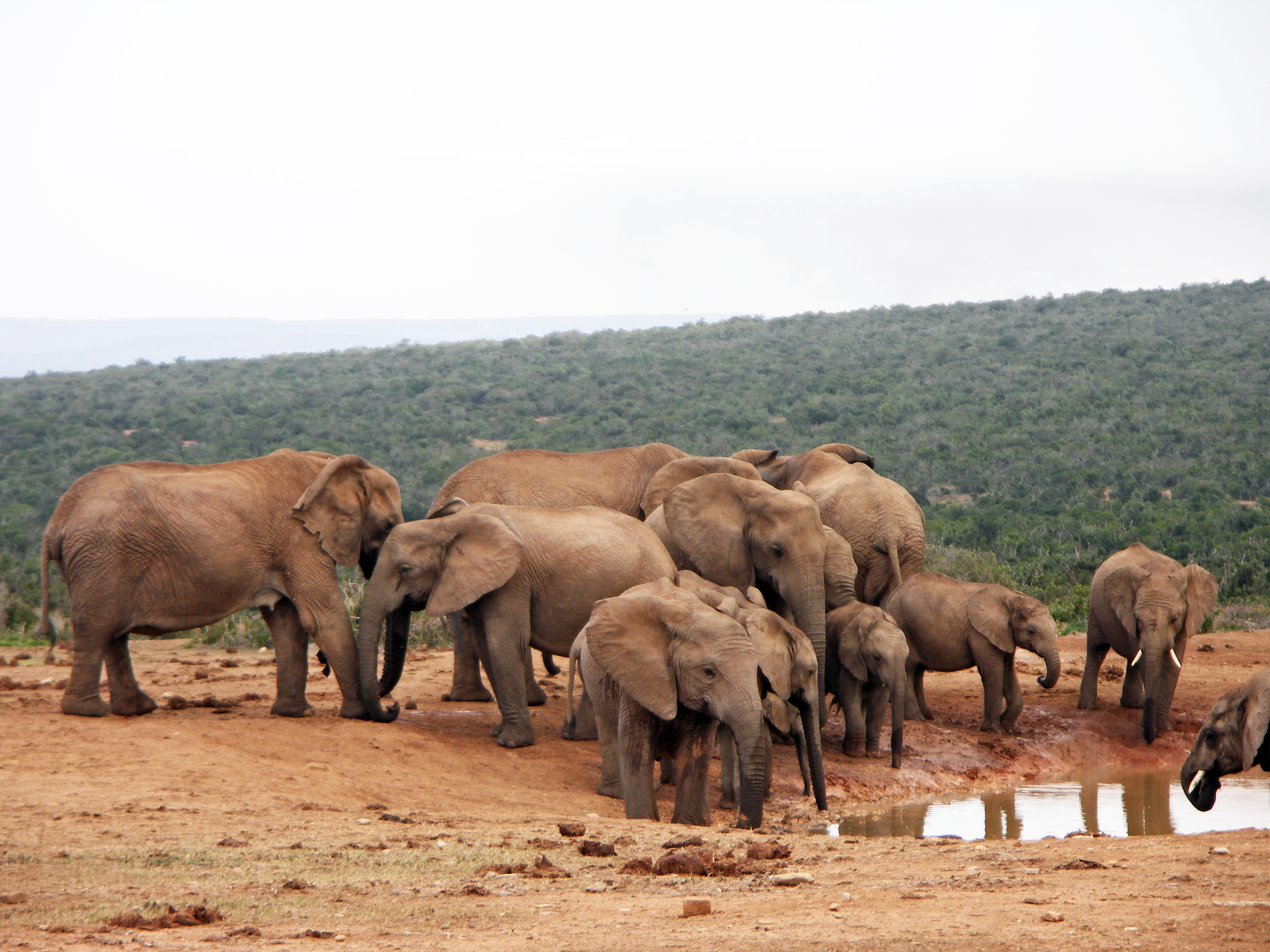
Elephants at the Hapoor Dam in the park

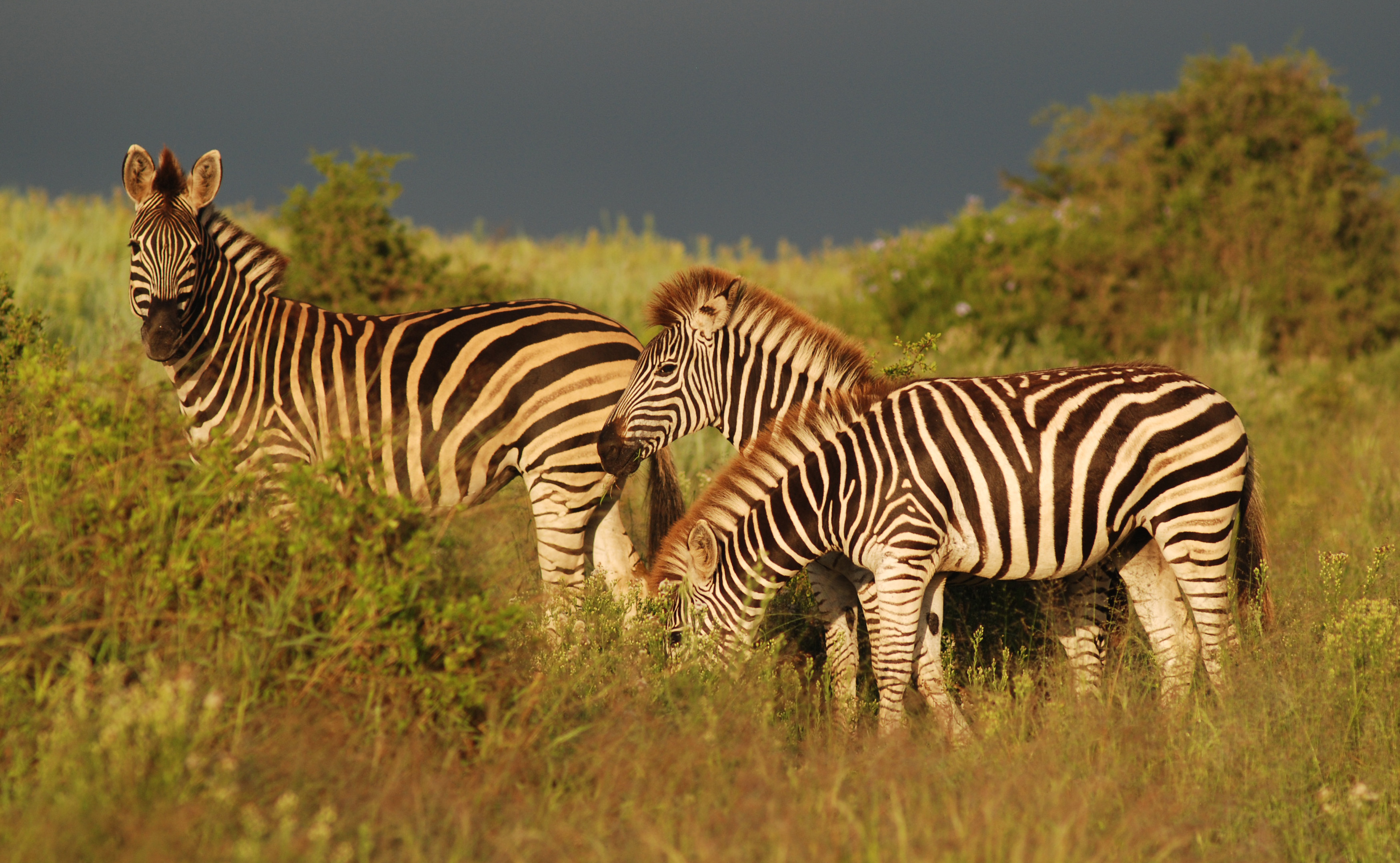
Adult Burchell's zebra and two foals

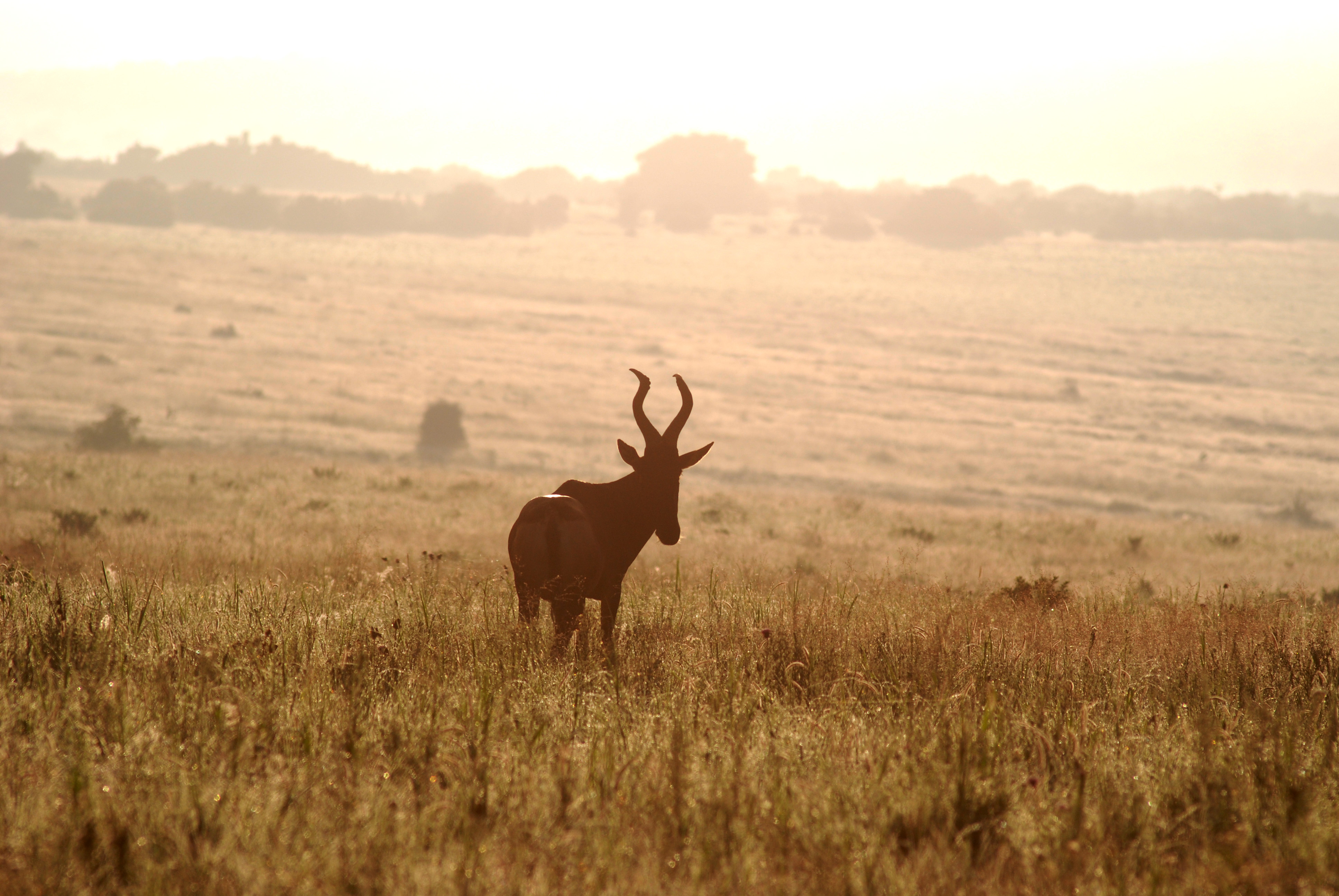
Red Hartebeest in morning mist

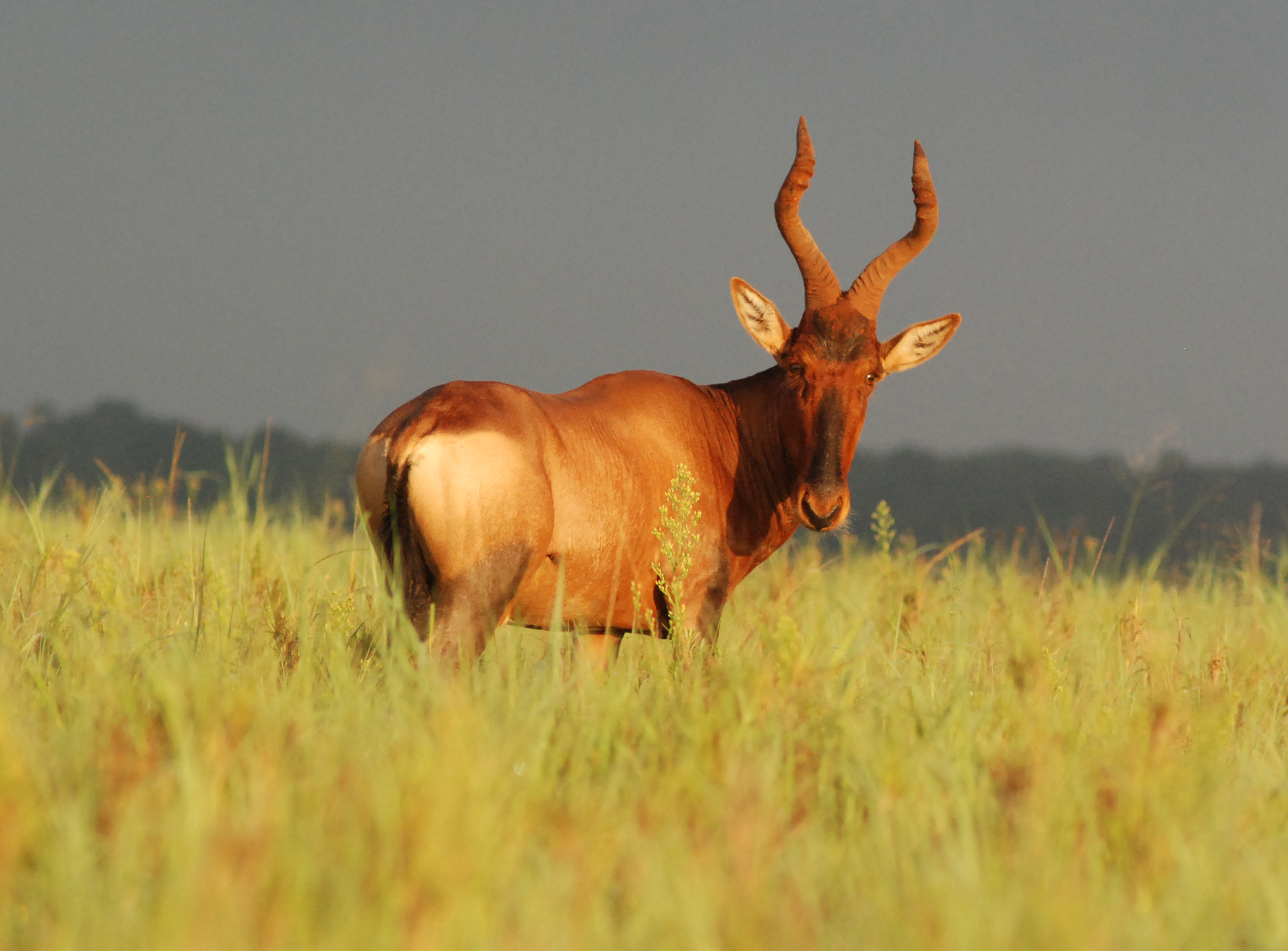
Red Hartebeest in early morning light

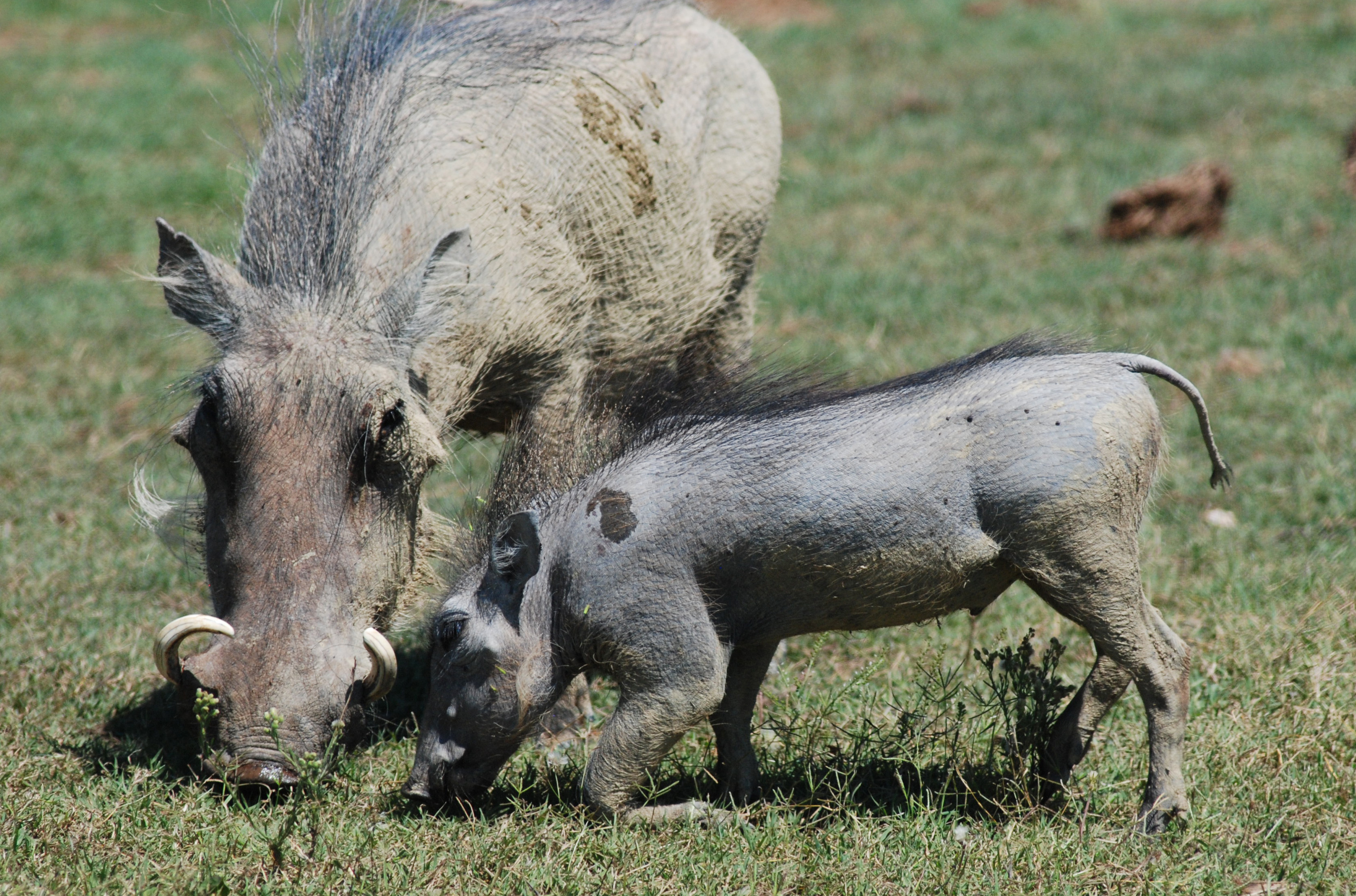
Warthog mother and piglet

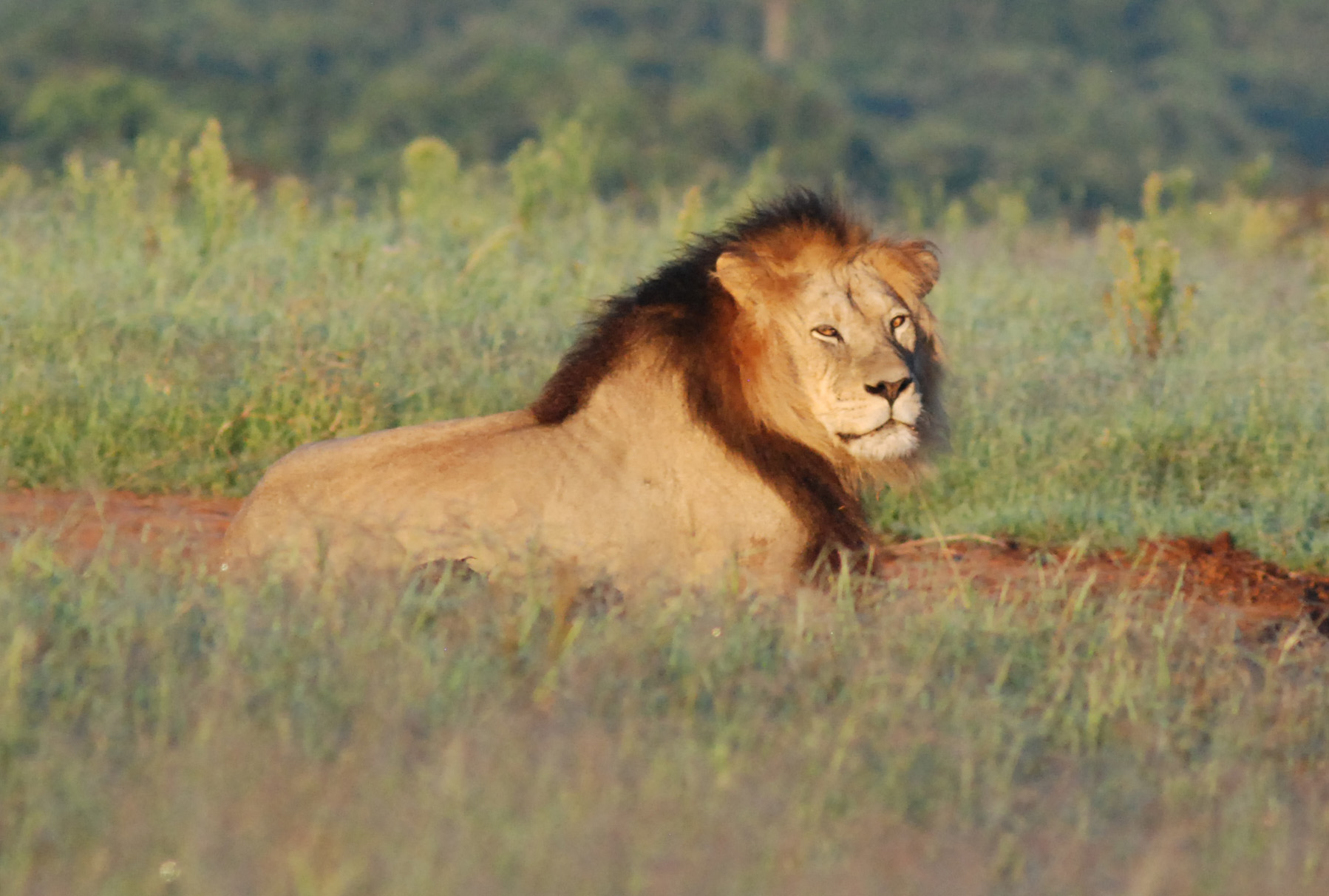
Male lion

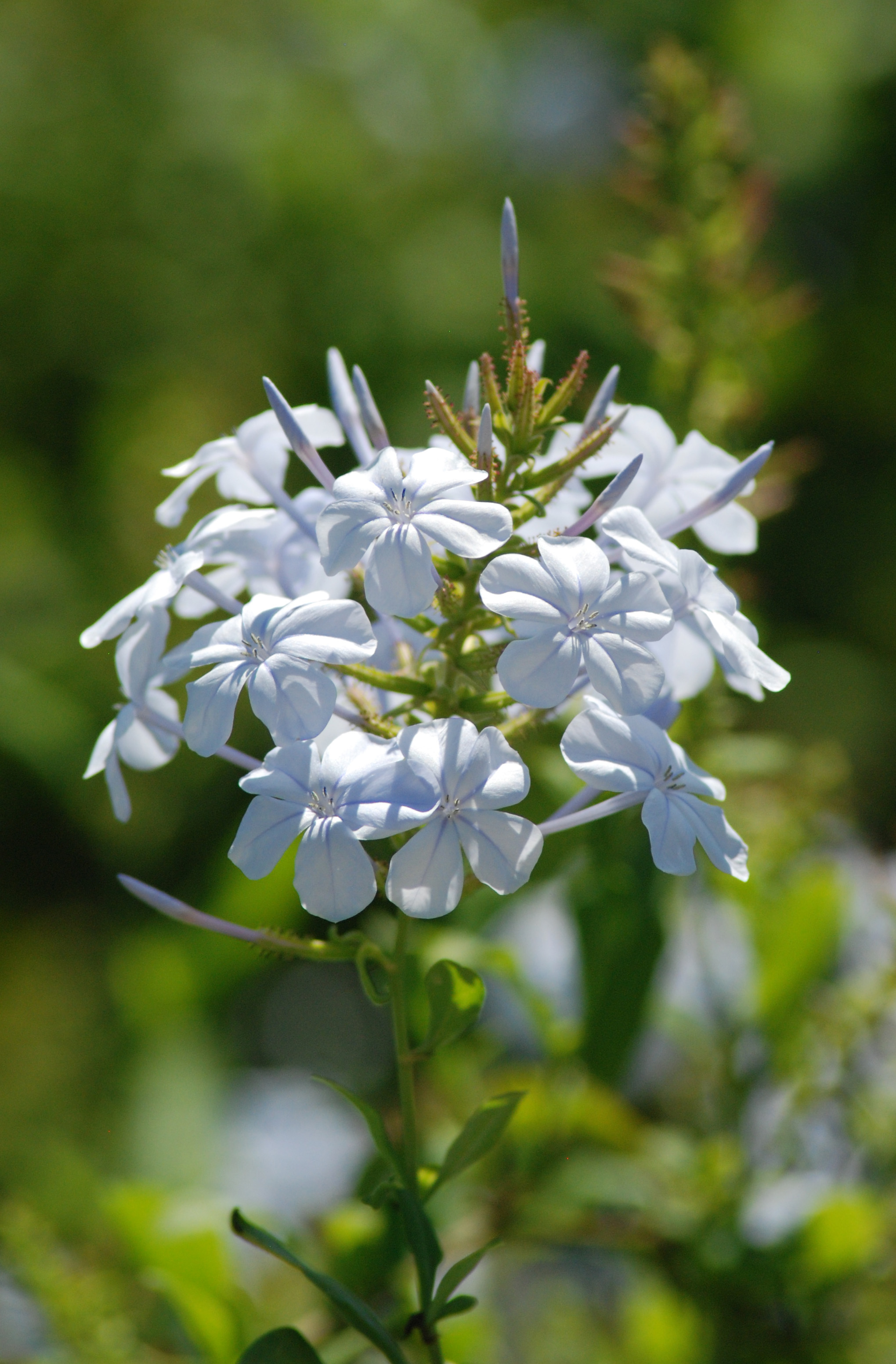
Blue plumbago (Plumbago auriculata)

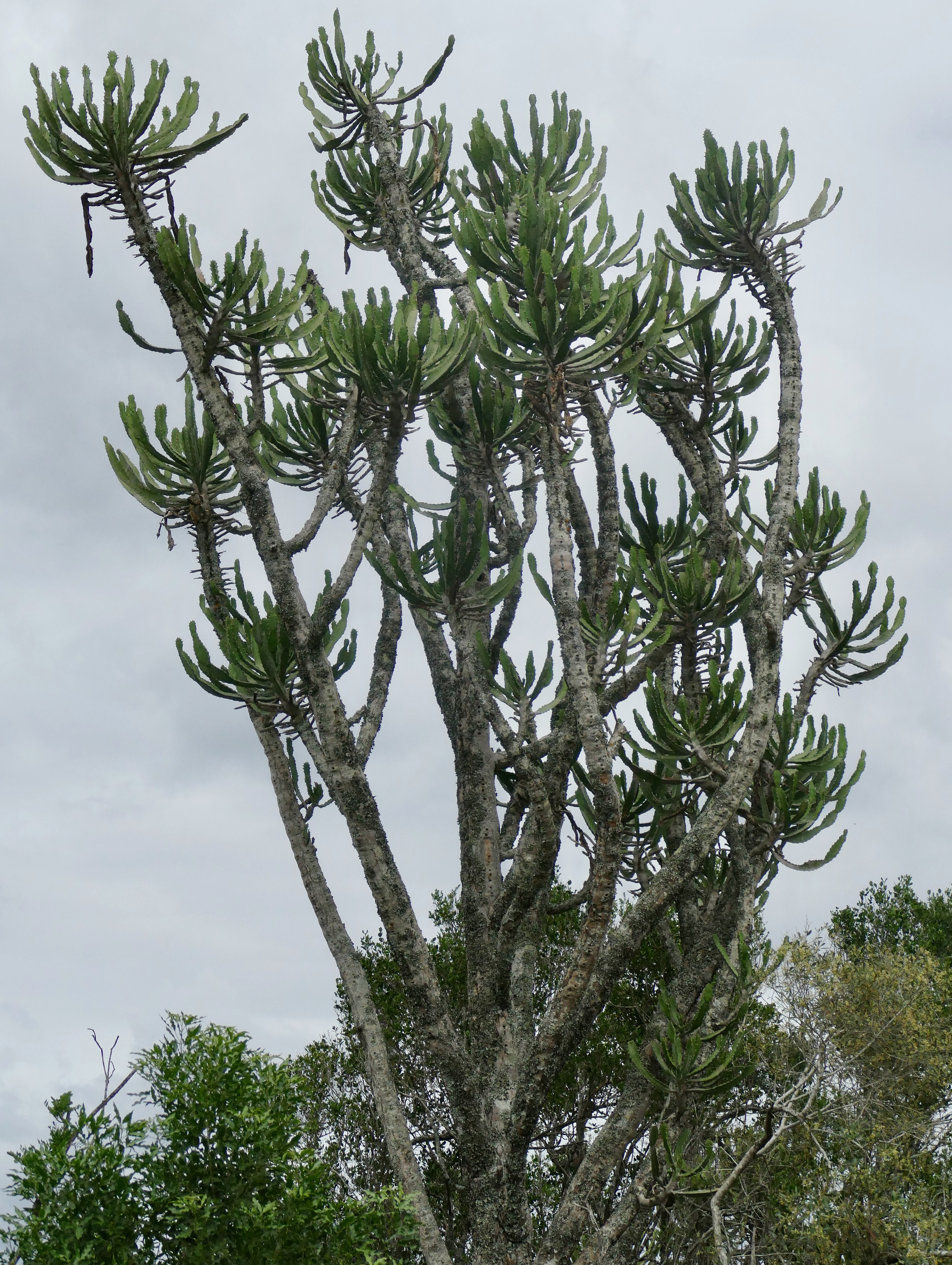
River Naboom (Euphorbia triangularis)

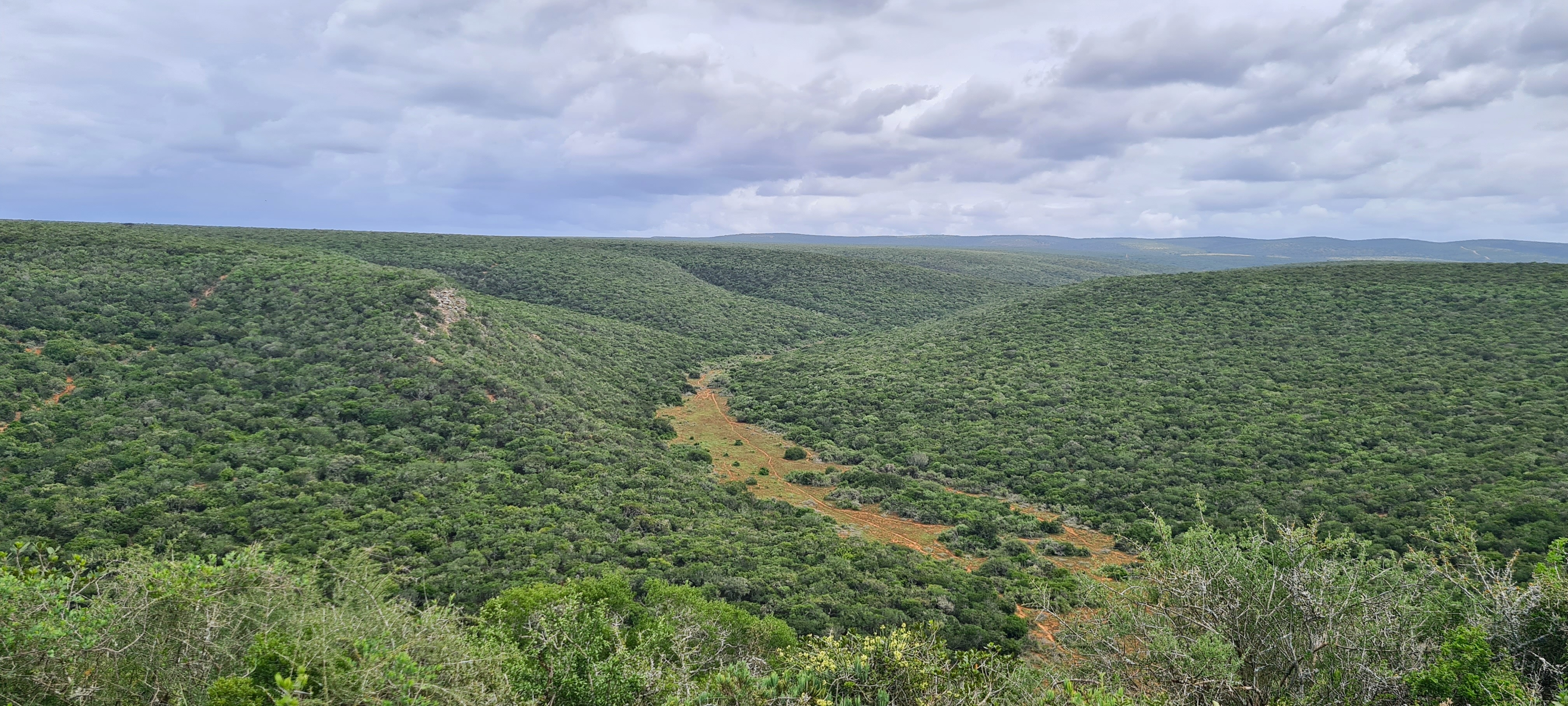
Lush Valley

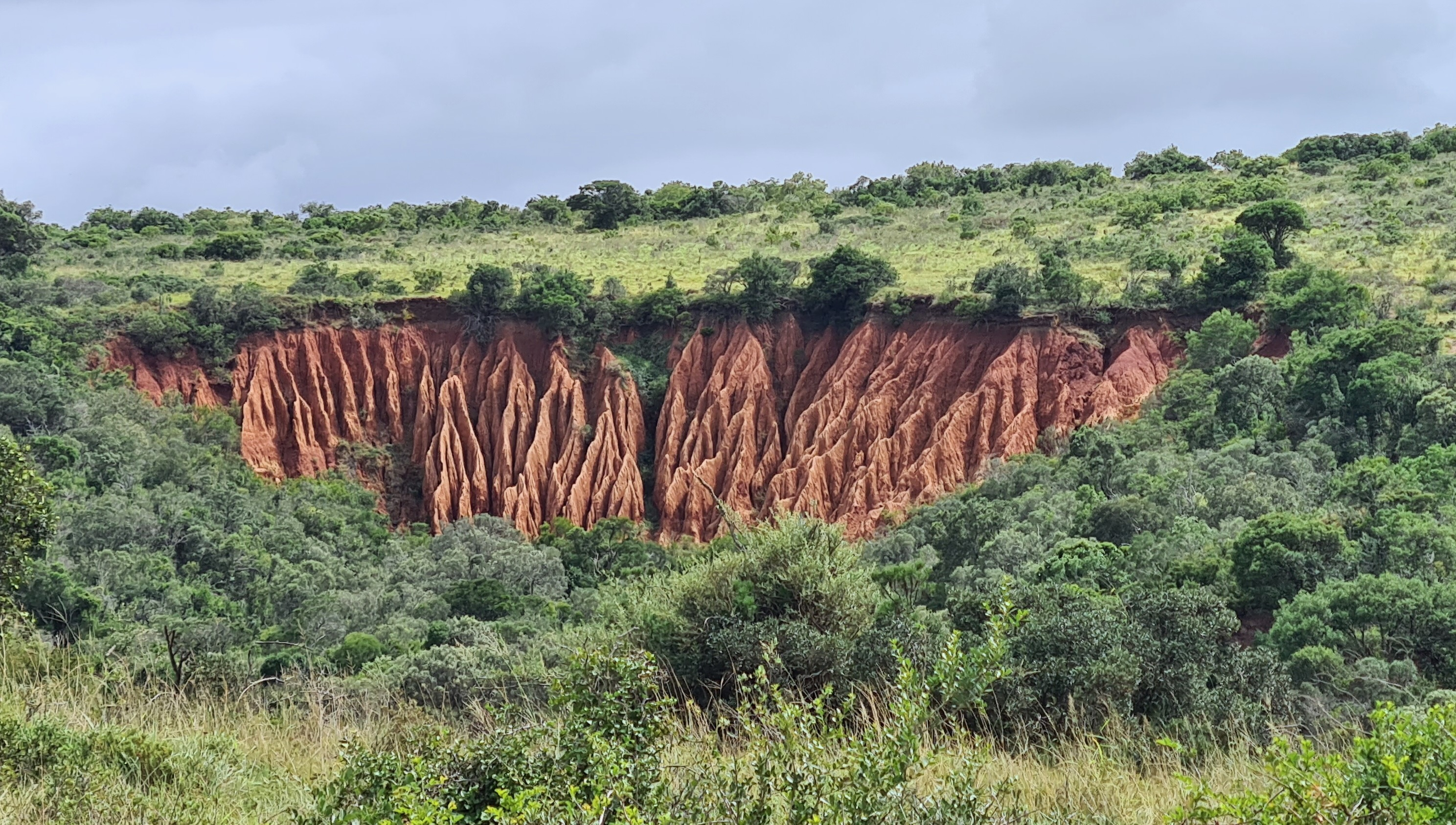
Erosion area

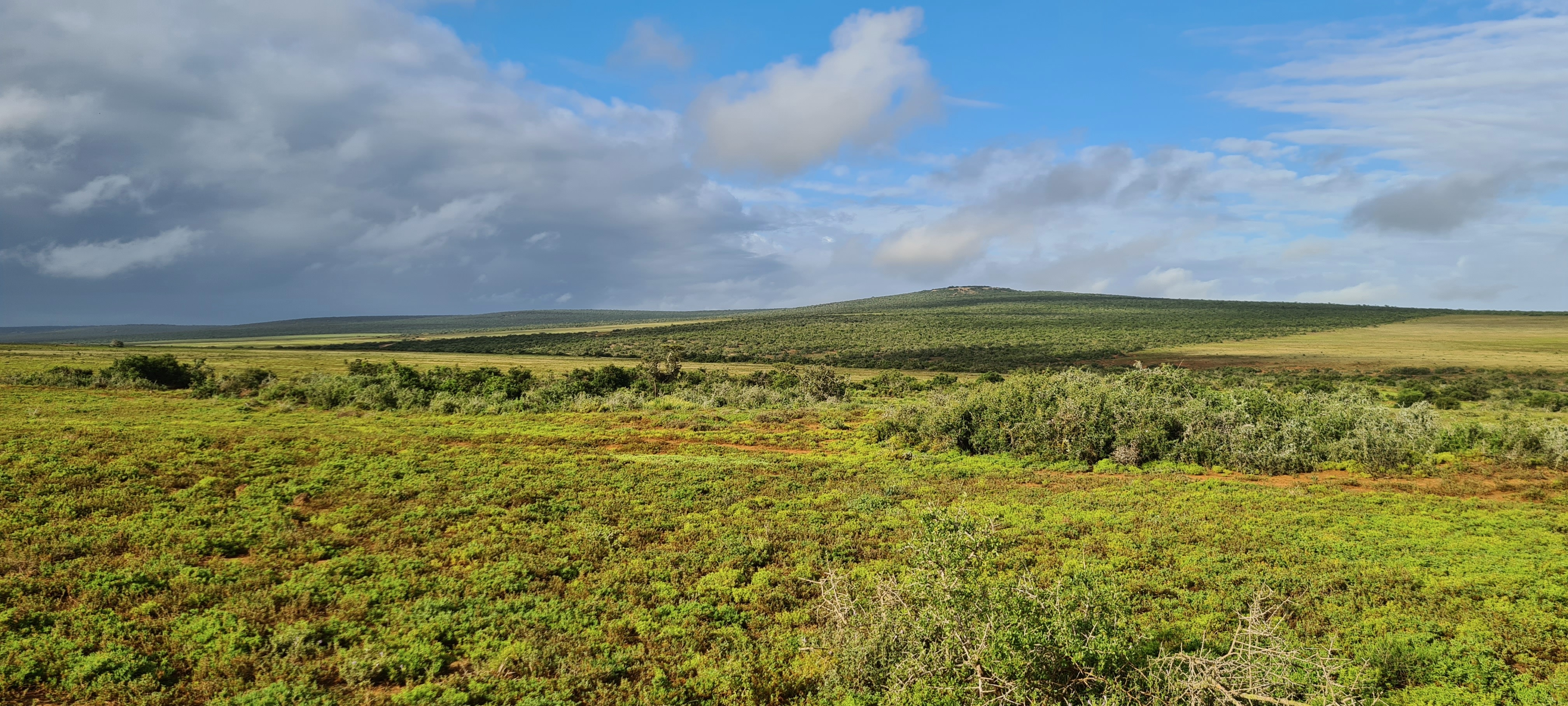
The landscape after the rains

== See also ==
- Addo Elephant Trail Run
