= List of dams and reservoirs in Eastern Cape =

Below is a list of dams and reservoirs in Eastern Cape, South Africa.

Name of dam (Alternative)	Nearest town	Impounds	Year completed (commissioned)	Capacity (Megaliter)	Surface area (km^{2})	Height of wall (meter)	Location	Notes
Aasvoel Dam	Humansdorp	Seekoei River	1997	390		15	34°2′52″S 24°44′47″E	
Anderson Dam	Dordrecht	Holspruit	1990	1 530	300	19		
Andrew F.C. Turpin Dam	Bedford	Nyara River					32°39′8″S 26°4′18″E	
Arnhem Dam	Grahamstown							
Avonleigh Dam	Graaff-Reinet	Moordenaars River						
Bakers Dam	Willowmore							
Balura Dam (Ciskei)	Alice							
Bathurst Stream Dam	Bathurst							
Beervlei Dam	Willowmore	Groot River	1957	88,096			33°02′19″S 23°27′57″E	
Belfort Dam	Matatiele			413			30°09′39″S 28°43′15″E	
Biggs Dam	Middelburg							
Binfield Park Dam	Alice	Tyhume River	1986	36,849	1.870	60	32°41′13″S 26°54′16″E	
Birmingham Dam (new)								
Bizana Dam								
Bloemhof Dam								
Bokkloof Dam								
Bonkolo Dam	Queenstown	Komani River	1908	6,943		24	31°52′04.4″S 26°55′15.4″E	
Boshoek Dam								
Bravo Dam								
Bridle Drift Dam	East London	Buffels River	1969	97,923	7.460	55	32°59′22″S 27°43′14″E	
Bulhoek Dam								
Bulk River Dam								
Bulolo Dam								
Bushmans Krantz Dam	Katberg	Oskraal River		4,818			32°20′58″S 26°40′56″E	
Cata Dam	Keiskammahoek	Cata River		12,080				
Churchill Dam (Krom River Dam)							34°0′3″S 24°29′36″E	
Collywobbles Dam								
Corana Dam				725				
Ctaigievar Dam								
Cypress Grove Dam								
Dabi Dam								
Darlington Dam				179,840			33°08′52″S 25°07′59″E	
De Mistkraal Dam				2,053				
Debe Dam	Middle Drift			6,331				
Dennegeur Dam								
Dogplum Dam								
Donnybrook Dam								
Doring River Dam							31°29′50″S 27°19′58″E	
Driefontein Dam							31°51′58″S 23°53′18″E	
Drieshof Dam								
Du Toitsvlakte Dam								
Edenvale Dam								
Eensaamheid Dam								
Elandsdrift Dam	Cradock	Great Fish River		3,546			32°31′48.2″S 25°45′22.5″E	
Endwell van Niekerk Dam								
Eselhoek Dam								
Ezeljacht Dam								
Fingo Gronde Dam								
First Falls Dam								
Formosa Dam								
Gcuwa Dam				421			32°18′47″S 28°08′01″E	
Geelhout Dam								
Glen Boyd Dam								
Glen Cliffe Dam								
Glen Melville Dam				6,229			33°11′43″S 26°39′00″E	
Glenbrock Dam								
Glenthorn Dam								
Grassridge Dam		Groot Brak River		44,5				
Groendal Dam		Swartopz River		11,7				
Gubu Dam		Gubu River		8,6				
Golden Ridge Dam								
Impofu Dam		Krom River		105,8				
Jozanashoek Dam		Sterkspruit River		9,5				
Katrivier Dam		Kat River		24,9				
Kommandodrift Dam		Tarka River		55,9				
Koega Dam		Koega River		126				
Kromrivier Dam		Krom River		35,3				
Laing Dam		Buffalo River		19				
Lake Arthur Dam		Tarka River		11,3				
Loerie Dam		Loeriespruit River		3,1				
Lubisi Dam		Indwe River		113,6				
Mabeleni Dam		Mhlahlane River		2,1				
Macubeni Dam		Cacadu River		3,4				
Mlanga Dam		Mlanga River		1,6				
Mnyameni Dam		uMnyama River		1,9				
Nahoon Dam		Nahoom River		19,3				
Ncora Dam		Tsomo River		147,3				
Nqadu Dam		Nqadu River		1,3				
Nqweba Dam		Sondags River		44,8				
Ntenetyana Dam		Ntenetyana River		1,7				
Nuwejaars Dam		Nuwejaarspruit Rivier		4,6				
Oxkraal Dam		Oskraal River		14,9				
Rooikrans Dam	Quonce	Buffalo River		4,8				
Sandile Dam	Keiskammahoerk			29,656			32°42′29″S 27°06′08″E	
Settlers Dam	Grahamstown	Kariega River and Palmiet River					33°24′42″S 26°30′34″E	
Toleni Dam		Toleni River		29,7				
Tsojana Dam		Tsojana River		12,3				
Umtata Dam		Mtata River		244,7				
Waterdown Dam		Klipplaat Rivier		37,5				
Wriggleswade Dam		Kubisi Rivier		91,5				
Xilinxa Dam		Xilinxa River		13,9				
Xonxa Dam		White Kei River		115,9				

== See also ==
- List of dams in South Africa
- List of rivers of South Africa
