= Fish to Tsitsikama Water Management Area =

Fish to Tsitsikama WMA, or Fish to Tsitsikama Water Management Area (coded: 15), in South Africa Includes the following major rivers: the Fish River, Kowie River, Boesmans River, Sundays River, Gamtoos River, Kromme River, Tsitsikamma River and Groot River, and covers the following Dams:

- Beervlei Dam Groot River
- Darlington Dam Sondags River
- De Mistkraal Dam Little Fish River
- Grassridge Dam Groot Brak River
- Groendal Dam Swartkops River
- Impofu Dam Krom River
- Katrivier Dam Kat River
- Kommandodrift Dam Tarka River
- Kouga Dam Kouga River
- Kromrivier Dam Krom River
- Loerie Dam Loerie Spruit
- Nqweba Dam Sondags River

== Boundaries ==
Primary drainage regions L, M, N, P, Q and tertiary drainage regions K80 and K90.

== See also ==
- Water Management Areas
- List of reservoirs and dams in South Africa
- List of rivers of South Africa
