= Gamtoos River =

River in the Eastern Cape, South Africa

Gamtoos River Gamtoosrivier
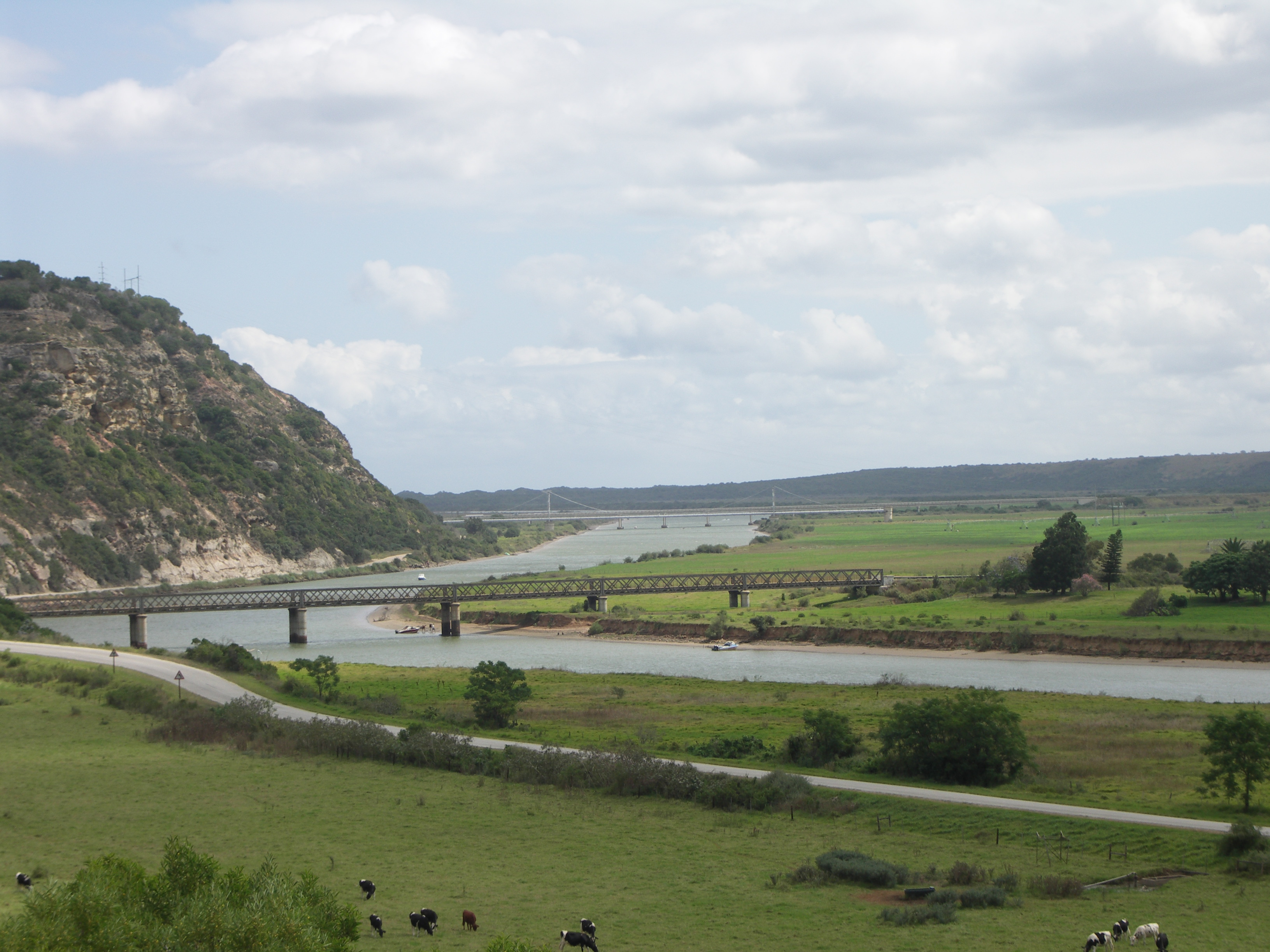
- Gamtoos River near its mouth into the Indian Ocean between Port Elizabeth and Jeffreys Bay, with the R102 bridge in the foreground and the N2 bridge in the background.

- Location of the Gamtoos River mouth
- Etymology: Probably derived from a Khoikhoi clan whose name was given by early Dutch settlers as "Gamtousch"
- Native name: Xelexwa (Xhosa)

Location
- Country: South Africa
- Province: Eastern Cape

Physical characteristics
- Source: _
- Source confluence: Kouga River / Groot River
  - coordinates: 33°44′45″S 24°36′55″E
  - elevation: 90 m (300 ft)
- Mouth: Indian Ocean
  - location: St. Francis Bay, Eastern Cape, South Africa
  - coordinates: 33°58′8.75″S 25°1′58.08″E
  - elevation: 0 m (0 ft)
- Length: 645 km (401 mi)
- Basin size: 34,635 km^{2} (13,373 sq mi)

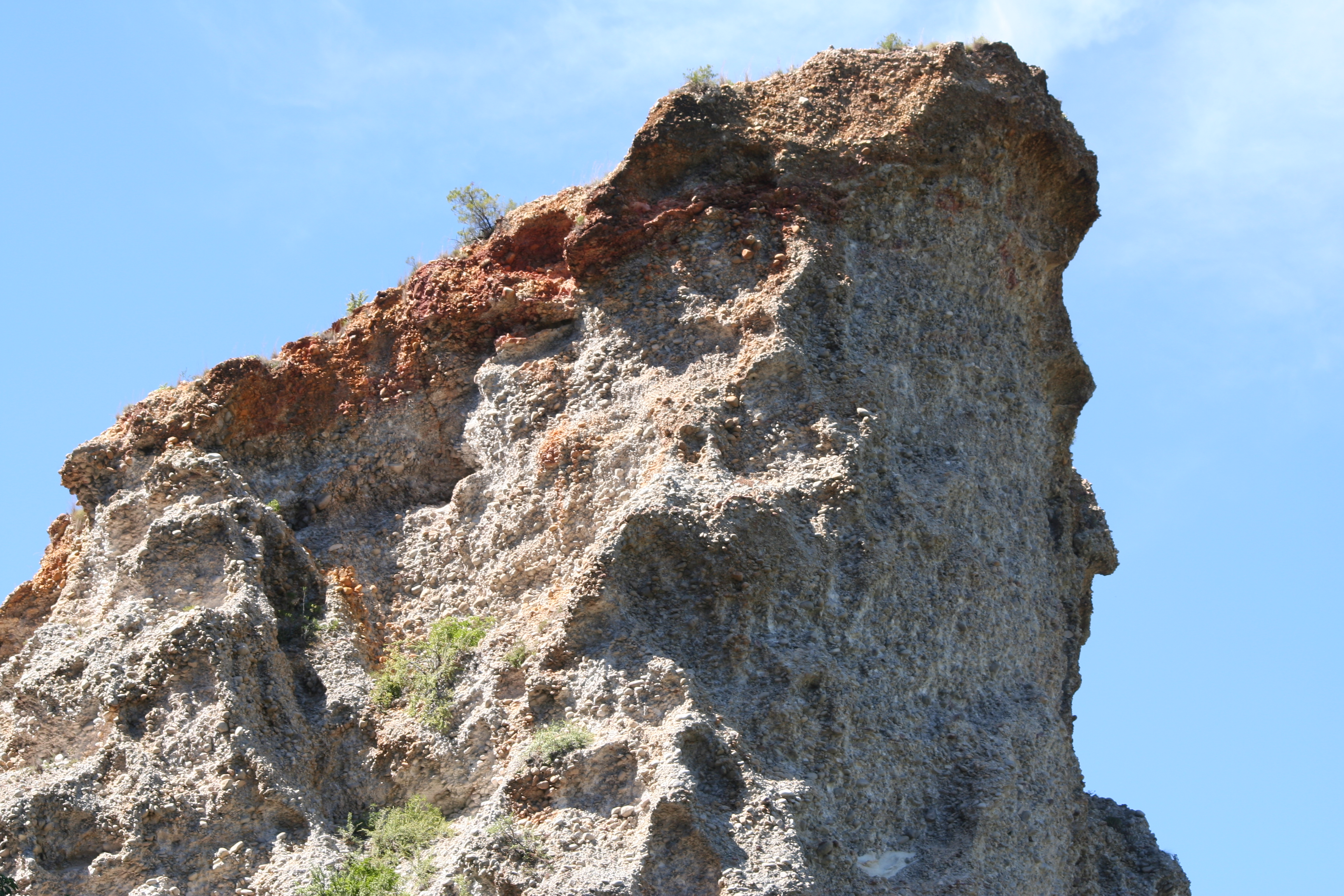
Outcrop of Enon Conglomerate formed by Alluvial deposits in the Gamtoos Valley, on the R331 between Patensie and the Kouga Dam

Gamtoos River or Gamptoos River is a river in the Eastern Cape Province, South Africa. It is formed by the confluence of the Kouga River and the Groot River and is approximately 645 kilometres (401 mi) long with a catchment area of 34,635 square kilometres (13,373 sq mi).

== Course ==
The Gamtoos river system is formed by the Groot, the Kouga and the Baviaanskloof rivers. The latter is a tributary of the Kouga.

Although the rainfall in the catchment area is low, it supports commercial irrigated agriculture in the lower catchment area, oranges, tobacco, citrus fruit and vegetables are grown. The estuary where the Gamtoos river enters the Indian Ocean is located between Jeffreys Bay and Port Elizabeth where the Gamtoos River Mouth Nature Reserve is located. The towns of Hankey, the oldest town situated in the Gamtoos river valley, and Patensie are situated in the lower catchment area. Further inland are the towns of Steytlerville, Joubertina, Uniondale, Willowmore and Murraysburg.

Tributaries include the Loerie River, Klein River, the Hol River, besides the Groot and the Kouga that form the Gamtoos.

== History ==
Saartjie Baartman - the "Hottentot Venus" - was born around 1789 in the vicinity of the Gamtoos river.

In 1877 during a severe drought in the region, the Gamtoos River dried up completely. During the floods of October 1867, according to John Croumbie Brown, the level of water in some parts of the river rose by up to 21 m (70 ft).

Two bridges cross the Gamtoos close to its mouth in the Kouga. The original 180-metre (600 ft) bridge on the R102 was opened in 1895 in order to replace the ferry that had been in use up to that time. A modern concrete bridge was built during the construction of the N2 in the early 1970s.

== Dams in the basin ==
Presently this river is part of the Fish to Tsitsikama Water Management Area.

- Kouga Dam in the Kouga River

== Ecology ==
In 1995 specimens of the Cape galaxias (Galaxias zebratus), a South African fish species endemic to the Cape Floristic Region, were found in the Krom River and subsequently they were also found in the Gamtoos River system. Until then it had been thought that its distribution was restricted to the area between the Keurbooms and the Olifants River. Although in South Africa this relatively delicate fish is only classified as near threatened, in Australia species of the same genus were driven to extinction by competing salmonids and other introduced species of fish.

== See also ==
- List of rivers of South Africa
- List of estuaries of South Africa
