= Kouga River =

River in the Eastern Cape, South Africa

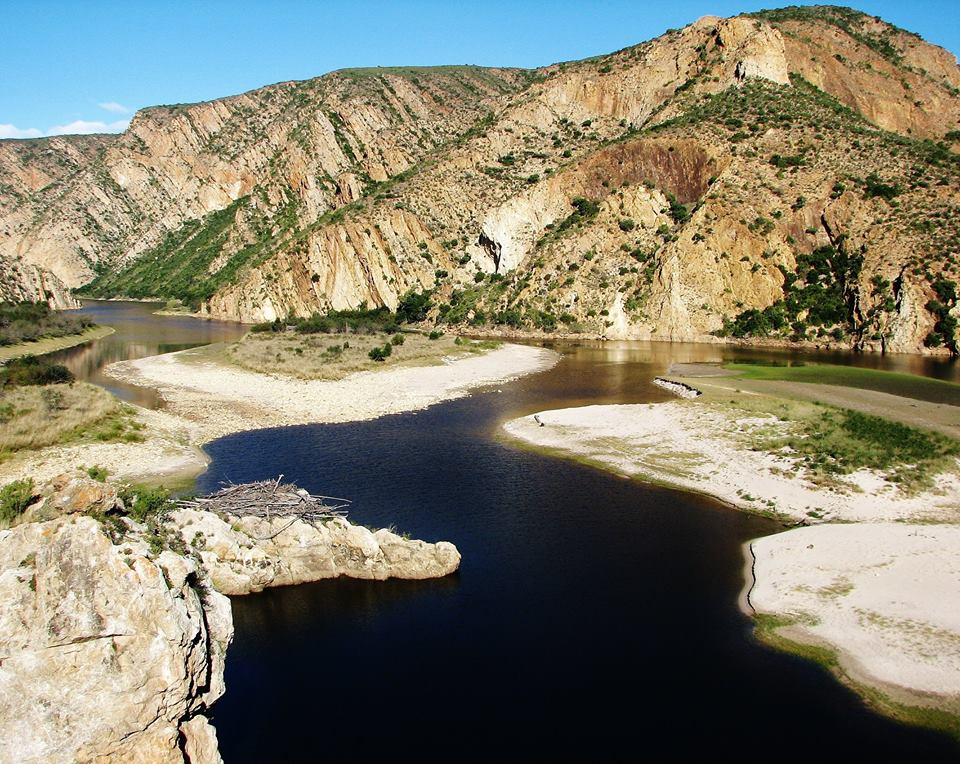

- Location within South Africa
- Etymology: 'many hippos' in Khoekhoe

Location
- Country: South Africa
- Province: Eastern Cape

Physical characteristics
- Mouth: Gamtoos River
  - location: Confluence with Groot River (Eastern Cape)
  - coordinates: 33°44′45″S 24°36′55″E
  - elevation: 90 m (300 ft)

The Kouga River originates near Uniondale, Eastern Cape, South Africa, and flows eastward, where it joins the Groot River to form the Gamtoos just past the Kouga Dam. Its main tributary is the Baviaanskloof River, which joins its left bank before the dam.

The Kouga is part of the Gamtoos river system which is formed by the Groot and the Baviaanskloof River.

The Kouga Mountains to the north the river, Kouga Municipality and Kou-Kamma Municipality are named after this waterbody.

== Ecology ==
In 1995 specimens of the Cape galaxias (Galaxias zebratus), a South African fish species endemic to the Cape Floristic Region, were found in the Kouga and in the Krom River. Until then it had been thought that its distribution was restricted to the area between the Keurbooms and the Olifants River. Although in South Africa this relatively delicate fish is only classified as near threatened, in Australia species of the same genus were driven to extinction by competing salmonids and other introduced species of fish.

== See also ==
- List of rivers of South Africa
- List of dams in South Africa
- List of drainage basins of South Africa
- Water Management Areas
