= Hendrik Spoorbek =

Heinrich Schörbeck (alias Hendrik Spoorbek/Skoorbek; Born in Dortmund, Germany – Died 13 June 1845 in Tsitsikamma, Cape Colony) was a seer, healer and magician who settled in South Africa around 1811.

In Afrikaner legends he is commonly known as Hendrik Spoorbek / Skoorbek the “Towenaar” (Magician / Wizard).

== Historical biography ==
Heinrich Schörbeck was born in Dortmund, Germany. He arrived at the Cape Colony (South Africa) around 1811 as a sailor and deserted. The Dutch, Flemish, Frisian, French and Norwegian settlers called him Hendrik Spoorbek. He became so tolerant of the local pronunciation of his name that he signed his will as Hendrik Spoorbek. On April 14, 1815, the farm “Spoorbek se Erf” (Spoorbek's Lot) was surveyed and registered in his name in the Humansdorp district along the Krom River (15 km from Kareedouw). The size of the farm was 58 morgen and Spoorbek agreed to pay 5 rixdollars a year in quit-rent. Spoorbek lived in a small thatched cottage with only two rooms. He built a watermill along the Krom River and ground wheat for the whole neighborhood. According to his death register entry he was a stonecutter of occupation, was unmarried and had no children. In 1901, Mr. J. R. van der Merwe, a school teacher who moved to Humansdorp, recorded tales of Spoorbek from elderly people who still had personal memories of the wizard who died 56 years earlier in 1845. Also, in 1917 Mrs. L. Rompel-Koopman interviewed the 86-year-old Mrs. Fick-Landman near Alexandria (born 1831) who told her about Spoorbek's life and referred to him as the “Witte Krag” (White Might). Mrs. Fick-Landman recalled: "Al was ik maar klein gewees toe hij leefde, ik het tog goed vir hom geken. Ons kinders was almal `n beetje bang vir hom" (Although I was small when he lived, I knew him very well. We children were all a little afraid of him). According to these recollections, Spoorbek was an untidy, kindhearted, eccentric hermit with wild curly hair, a long beard, dressed in black clothes in rags, had a verminous appearance, and rode a white horse. Besides being a stonecutter and miller, Spoorbek was a great traveller who did various jobs for the settlers, including healing the sick and protecting people and their property with his magical powers.

== Seer, Magician and Healer ==
Spoorbek was widely credited with the ability to prevent and put out fires. Thatch roofs under his protection would not burn – even when tested. The homestead Uitvlucht used to be pointed out as one of the dwellings under his protection. Spoorbek took part in the 1834 defense of Kerkplaats (now Alexandria) in the Olifantshoek area against the Xhosa during the 6th Xhosa War (1834–1836). All the houses in town were destroyed and the settlers made their last stand in the schoolhouse. When the Xhosa horde surrounded the schoolhouse and tried to burn it down, Spoorbek assured the townsfolk: "Wees gerus, die skoolhuis sal nie brand" (Be calm, the schoolhouse will not burn). The Xhosa warriors repeatedly thrust flaming pieces of wood into the thatch roof of the schoolhouse, but it did not catch fire. After hours of shooting, the settlers managed to drive the Xhosa's away. All the other buildings, including the church, were burned down. Only the schoolhouse was unharmed and stands to this day. In another case, a house was on fire and Spoorbek was called in to help. He allegedly rode around the house in a circle with his white horse and dragged a long staff on the ground. After he completed the circle around the house the fire leaped from the roof onto the magic circle. Spoorbek rode away on his horse and the flames followed him - most possessions in the house were saved from the fire. In another account, Spoorbek put out a fire in a sheepkraal between Bedford and Adelaïde which smouldered for eight days despite constant rain. He gave the farmer three pieces of white paper and told him: "Gooi dit in die brandende kraal, loop, en kijk nie om" (Throw it in the burning kraal, walk away, and do not look back). The man did what Spoorbek told him and the smouldering fire was extinguished.

Spoorbek was not afraid of snakes and he would not allow anyone to kill a snake in his presence. He claimed to have the power to call a gathering of all the snakes between two rivers. Spoorbek had the ability to make water run uphill, and many tales are told of farmers who watched in disbelief while Spoorbek influenced the flow of water in their irrigation furrows. Transport riders often asked Spoorbek to protect their oxen from theft and wild animals. Eyewitnesses recalled how Spoorbek drew a magic circle on the ground around oxen with a staff. The oxen would remain in safety within the protective circle throughout the night. The next morning the animals would not cross the magic circle until Spoorbek came and led them out.

According to various accounts, Spoorbek had the gift of foresight. Mrs. Fick-Landman recalled: "Die mense het altijd angstig gevoel als hij in die huis is, want hulle weet goed, elke woord wat hulle praat, hoor hij, al is hij nie in die kamer nie. Maar die mense het daarom tog die grootste verering vir hom gehad, hij het altijd elkeen gehelp wat in die nood was en wou nooit geld aanneem nie". (The people always felt anxious if he was in the house because everyone knew that he had the ability to hear every single word they spoke, even if he was not in the same room. But the people had the greatest praise for him, for he always helped those in need and refused to accept money). During a drought he warned a Gamtoos River farmer against flood. Three nights later the river came down with might and swept the farmers stock and vegetables into the sea. Spoorbek allegedly prophesied the invention of trains and airplanes, the South African Anglo Boer Wars and the Spanish flu epidemic of 1918. One of Spoorbek's friends who lived 18 miles away wanted Spoorbek to take charge of his funeral arrangements. "Hoe sal jij weet as ik afsterwe?" (“How will you known when I am dead?”), the man asked. Spoorbek replied: "`n Misterieuse ster sal in die hemel gesien word, en dan sal almal weet“ (A mysterious star will be seen in the sky, and then everyone will know”). A mysterious star was seen, and everyone met for the funeral before any message reached them.

The great hunter and explorer Jan Viljoen, who reached the Victoria Falls shortly after David Livingstone, went to Spoorbek's cottage one afternoon and asked Spoorbek to accompany him to a funeral. Viljoen offered to go into the field and bring Spoorbek's white horse to the cottage while Spoorbek was dressing. Spoorbek told him: "Nee, moe nie - mij paard sal weet as ik hom benodig" (“No, don’t do that – my horse will know when I need him”). And surely, when they were ready, Spoorbek's white horse trotted up to the door of the cottage to be saddled.

Spoorbek never locked the door of his cottage. He would be talking to a neighbor, when suddenly he would get a dreamy look in his eyes and say: "Ik moet huis toe, iemand beroof mij huis" (“I must go home, someone is trying to rob my house”). When they went to his house they would found the thief paralyzed in the act of stealing. One time, they found a man who entered Spoorbek's house and tried to pour himself a glass of brandy. The man remained transfixed with the bottle and glass in his hands until Spoorbek touched him. In another case, a man stole grain, but found himself impelled to carry the stolen goods back to Spoorbek's house to relieve himself of a great pain in his back - which felt like a thousand needles driven into his flesh. The pain only left the man's body on Spoorbek's command. One day, Spoorbek visited Mooimeisiesfontein - the farm of Piet Retief near Riebeek. A man stole a bag of flour from a wagon that was parked outside the house. As the man went out the gate he suddenly found that he was unable to move. Spoorbek casually walked up to the man and arrested the flour thief.

One night Spoorbek slept on the Farm Jagersbos with the Meiring Family. After he had gone, one of the women remarked: "Kijk, die ou vark het sij tabaksak hier vergeet" (“Look, the old pig has forgotten his tobacco pouch”). Soon afterward, Spoorbek returned to collect his tobacco pouch and embarrassed the woman by repeating her words out loud. Another woman who was rude to Spoorbek lost the power of speech. She was only able to speak again after Spoorbek was called back to the farm and lifted the curse. During another incident, a young couple passed Spoorbek in the street, the woman remarked: "Jinne, hier kom die ou towenaar" (“Oh my, here comes the old magician”), and they laughed at him openly. Spoorbek looked at them and said: "Jul tweejes dink jul gaan eendag trouw, maar onthou dit - jul sal nooit trouw!" (“You two think you are going to be married, but remember this – you will never be married!”). On the day of their planned wedding, just as the minister started with the service, the bride left the church by the one door and the bridegroom by another. They were never married.

In another account, Spoorbek visited the Marais family. Mrs. Marais refused to give Spoorbek accommodation for the night. As Spoorbek left the house he took three fire matches and put them into the thatch roof above the door entrance. He told Mrs. Marais: "Jij moe nie vir hulle wegvat, ook nie aanraak" (You must not remove them, don't even touch them). When Mr. Marais made apologies for his wife's rude behavior, Spoorbek replied: "Dit beteken niks, pas net goed op dat sij nie die houtjes wegvat" (It means nothing, just make sure that she never removes the matches). Afterward, the man and his wife argued a lot about the matches. One day when Mrs. Marais was baking bread, she removed the matches and threw them into the fire. The same night she became insane. They called upon Spoorbek to help her. He asked if there were any pieces of the matches left. When they told him that all three matches were burned to ashes, Spoorbek replied: "Ik kan dan niks vir haar doen" (Then I can do nothing for her).

Many farmers called upon Spoorbek to act as a doctor. He was especially clever in treating mental disorders and was not afraid to do minor surgeries. He refused to take payment for his medical services. One night Spoorbek was called out to the farm Langvlakte near Alexandria where a Mrs. Potgieter was seriously ill and everybody expected the worst. Her sister in law was nursing her. When Spoorbek walked in the room he remarked: "Dit is wonderlik - die dooies kijk agter die lewendes" (“It is marvelous – the dead look after the living”). The meaning of his words became clear when soon afterward Mrs. Potgieter recovered and her sister in law died.

Many travelers went to Spoorbek and asked him to prepare protection charms for them. Spoorbek was on good terms with the Voortrekker leaders Karel Landman, Piet Uys and Gert Rainier, who left the Cape Colony with ox wagons in search for a better life in the mainland. When Gert Rainier left the colony in 1837, he carried one of Spoorbek's protective packets round his neck. Spoorbek told him that as long as he did not open it, the charm would protect him against “assegai” (African spears). Rainier's horse was killed underneath him during the Battle of Blood River, but he escaped unharmed. In old age, Rainier opened the charm at the request of his daughters. The packet only contained four pieces of white paper.

Spoorbek was fond of honey. He often climbed a steep rock besides the river to remove honey from a beehive. He often told his friends: "Niemand sal heuning uit die nes haal as ik eendag dood is - alles sal onder water wees eendag" (“No one will take honey from that nest when I am dead – everything will be covered with water one day”). His prophecy became true when the Port-Elizabeth municipality dammed the river during World War II as part of a water scheme. Most of Spoorbek's farm, including the place he used to gather honey, is today under water.

When people asked Spoorbek to reveal the source of his magical powers he told them that he had brought a book of magic with him to South Africa, but it was stolen soon after his arrival. To others he attributed his powers to a mysterious flower called the Faroblom which blooms only once a year and during one hour of the night.

== Death ==
Spoorbek died in the house of Mrs. Hilgard Muller in the Tsitsikamma Forest on June 13, 1845. According to his death record he was in his late 80s. He was buried near the track leading to his farm. Spoorbek asked that certain books should be buried with him in his coffin, and his wish was carried out. It was reported that a mysterious star was seen in the sky the night Spoorbek died. A girl age 14 (later Mrs. Strydom) allegedly saw Spoorbek's spirit dressed in white going up into the sky during a great thunderstorm. Though the farm “Spoorbek se Erf” was flooded after the construction of the dam, his grave remained above water level. His signed will may be seen at the Master's Office in Cape Town. Mr. Petrus Hendrik du Preé was his heir. He left him a collection of pots, hammers, chisels and augers, a saddle, a table, five shirts and two trousers. At the time of his death, Spoorbek's movable and immovable assets were valued at £52-10. A farmer named Mr. I.J. du Plessis of Misgund tried to claim £80 he loaned to Spoorbek a few years earlier. Shortly before his death, Spoorbek claimed to have hidden a “great treasure”.

== Contemporary interest ==
Many people visit Humansdorp and Kareedouw each year in an attempt to trace Spoorbek's legendary history. The location of his grave is only known to a handful of local people. The mountain pass in the Kareedouw Mountain is called Spoorbek se Nek (34° 04' S 24° 27' E).
