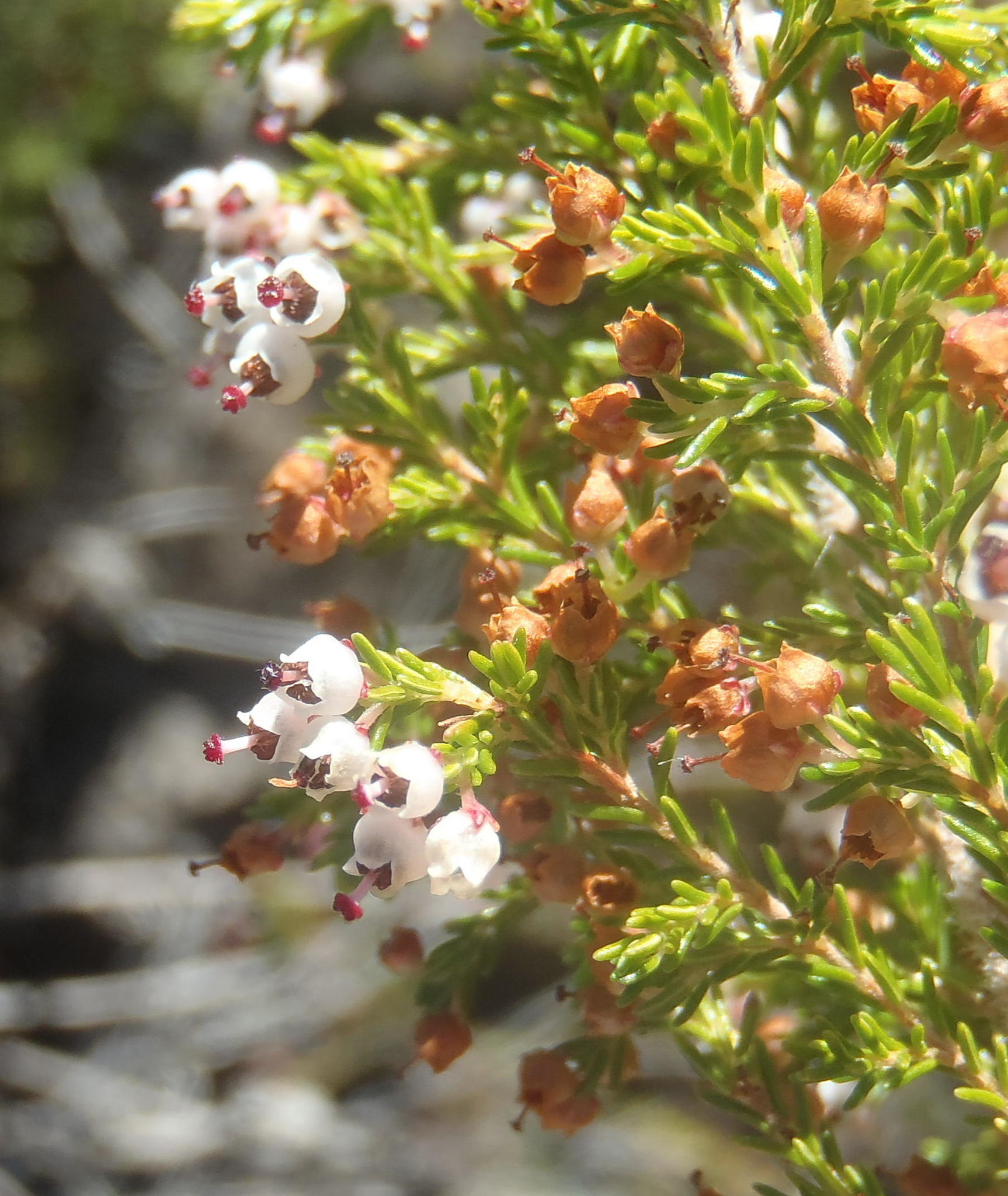

Scientific classification
- Kingdom: Plantae
- Clade: Tracheophytes
- Clade: Angiosperms
- Clade: Eudicots
- Clade: Asterids
- Order: Ericales
- Family: Ericaceae
- Genus: Erica
- Species: E. inconstans

Binomial name
- Erica inconstans Zahlbr.

= Erica inconstans =

Species of flowering plant

Erica inconstans, the Outeniqua heath, is a tree belonging to the genus Erica and is part of the fynbos. The species is endemic to the Western Cape and Eastern Cape and occurs in the Outeniqua Mountains and Tsitsikamma Mountains. The plant's habitat is threatened by uncontrolled invasive plants. The tree's FSA number is 574.1.
