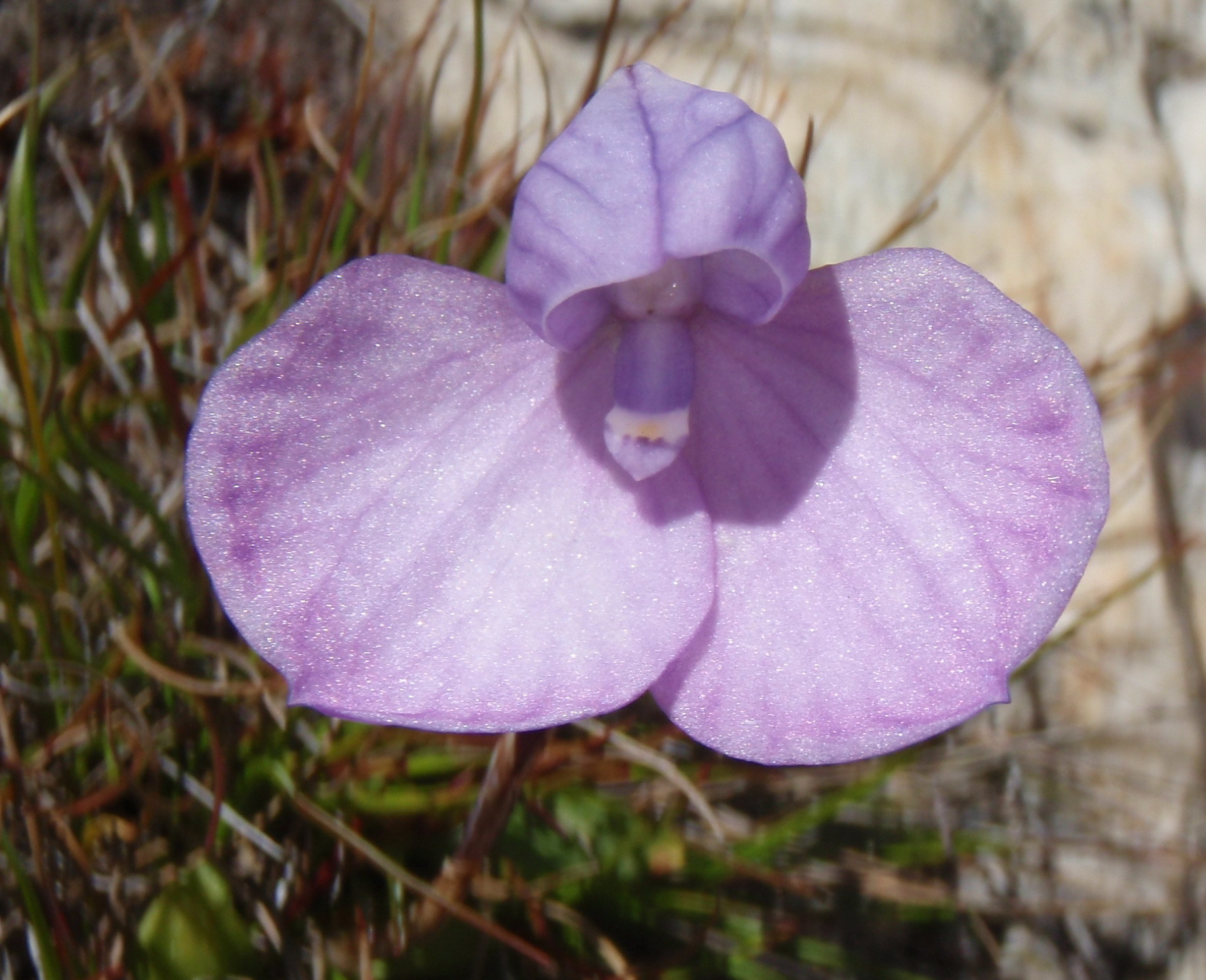

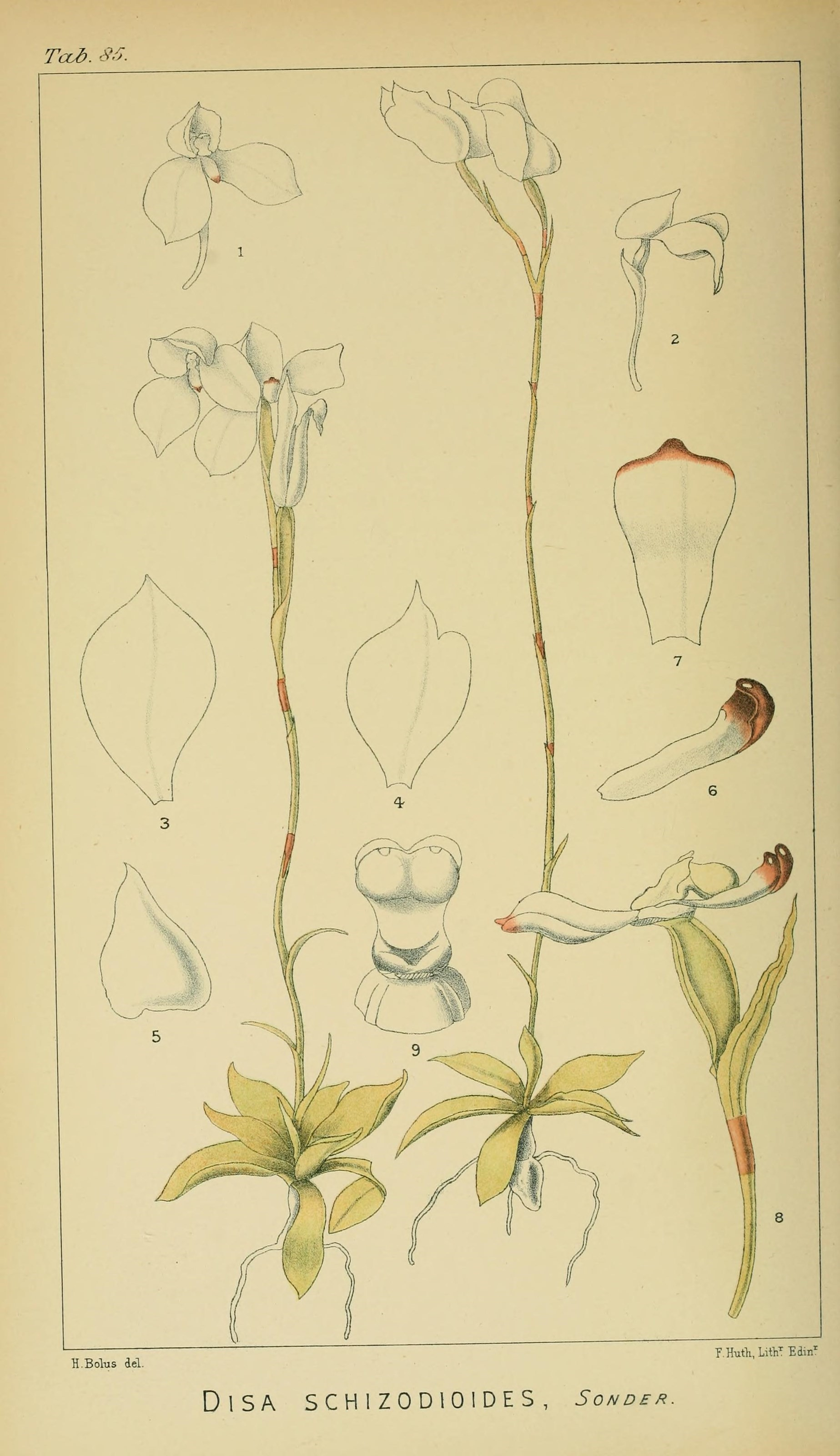

Scientific classification
- Kingdom: Plantae
- Clade: Tracheophytes
- Clade: Angiosperms
- Clade: Monocots
- Order: Asparagales
- Family: Orchidaceae
- Subfamily: Orchidoideae
- Genus: Disa
- Species: D. schizodioides

Binomial name
- Disa schizodioides Sond.

Synonyms
- Orthopenthea schizodioides (Sond.) Rolfe

= Disa schizodioides =

Species of flowering plant

Disa schizodioides is a perennial plant and geophyte belonging to the genus Disa and is part of the fynbos. The plant is endemic to the Western Cape and occurs in the Langeberg, Touwsberg, Rooiberg, Swartberg, Outeniqua Mountains and Kouga Mountains. It prefers moist, rocky crevices at altitudes of 1000-2000 m. There are seven subpopulations and the species has no threats. The plant is considered rare.
