= Formosa Peak =

Mountain in South Africa

- Peak Formosa
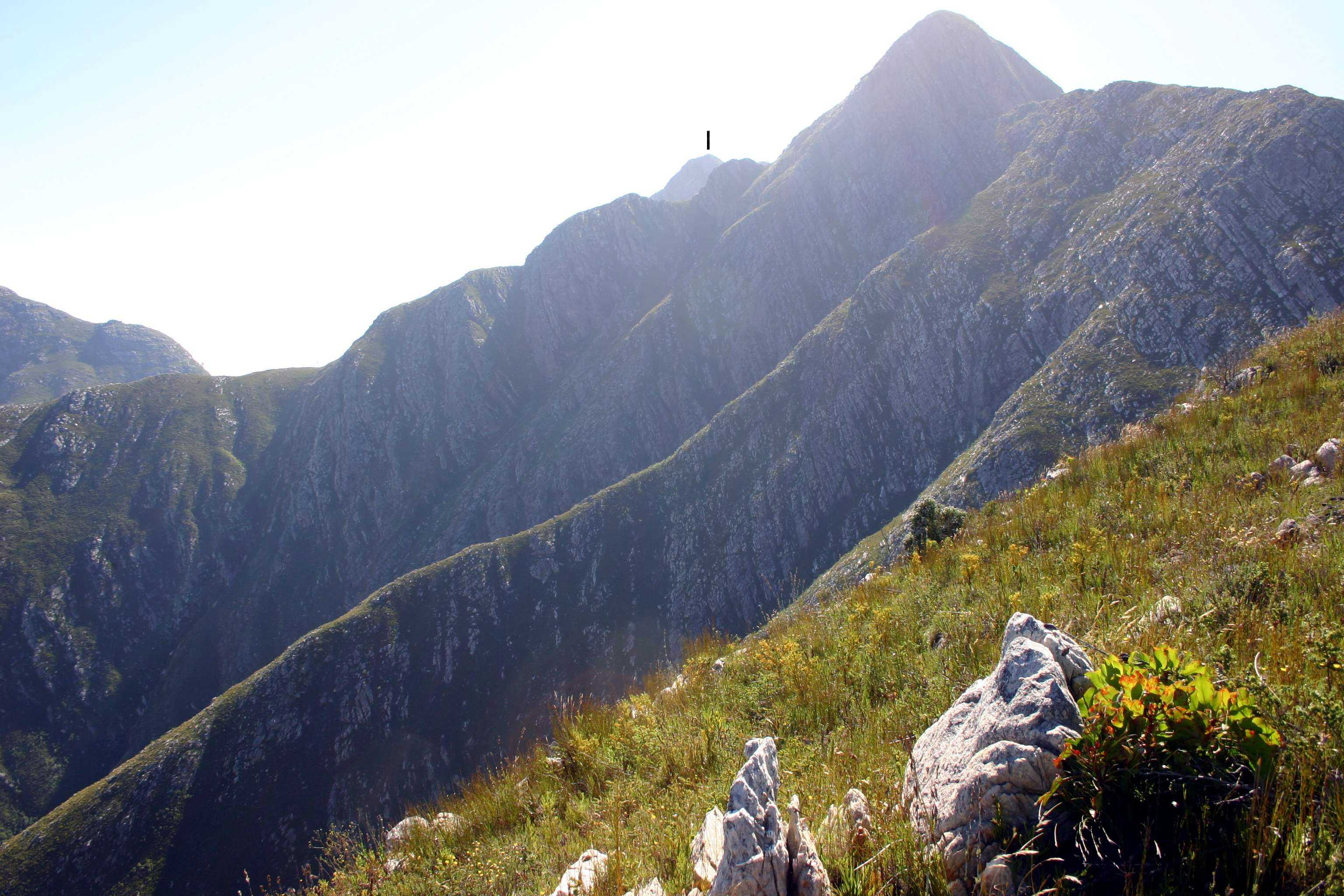
- Ridge leading to Formosa Peak (marked) in the Tsitsikamma Mountains

Highest point
- Elevation: 1,675 m (5,495 ft)
- Coordinates: 33°51′50.8″S 23°42′12″E

Geography
- Location within Eastern Cape
- Location: South Africa
- Parent range: Tsitsikamma Mountains

Climbing
- Easiest route: Scrambling

Formosa Peak or Peak Formosa is the highest point of the Tsitsikamma Mountains, a coastal range located along the Garden Route in South Africa, and forming part of the Baviaanskloof Mega Reserve.

== Background ==
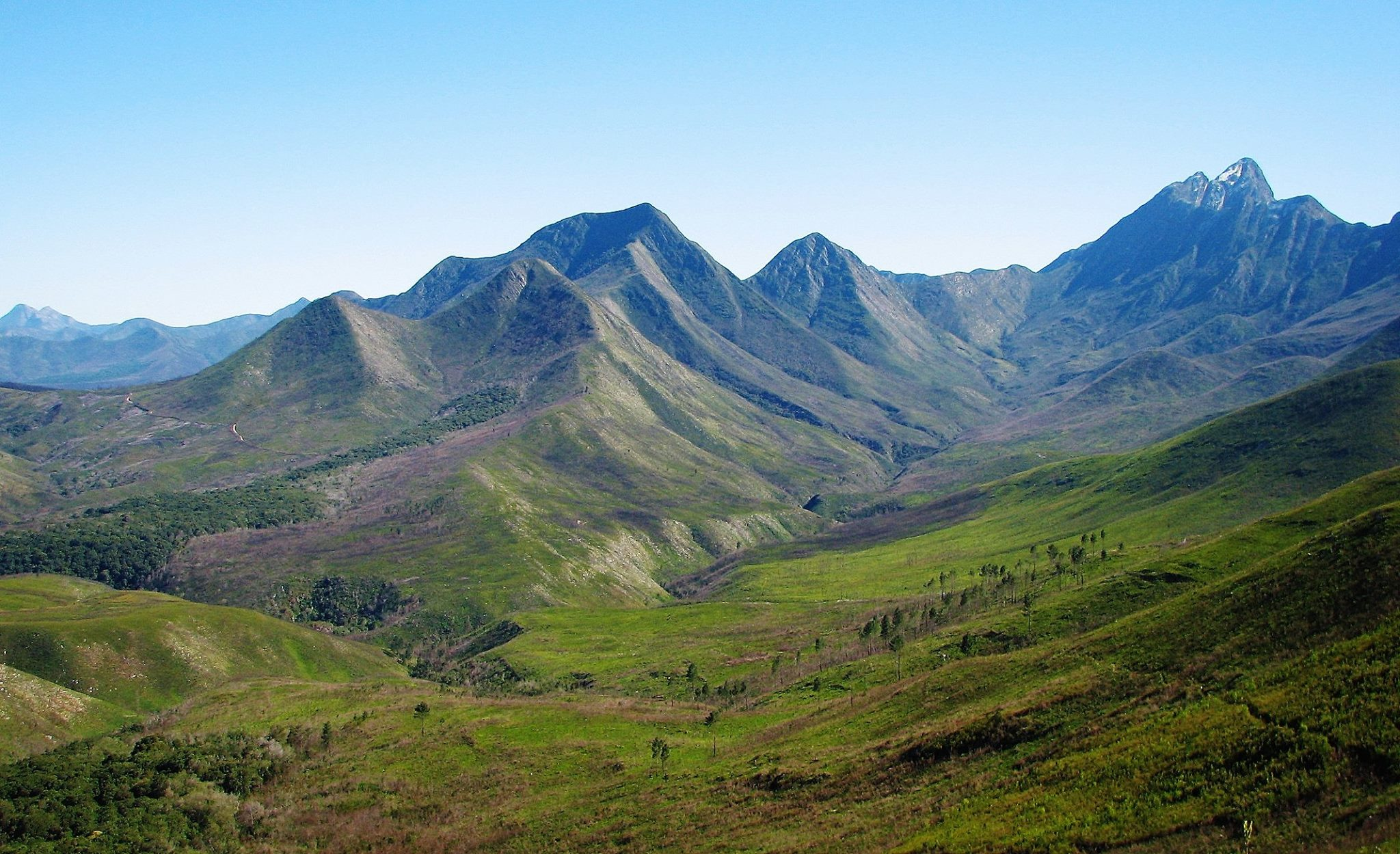
Peak Formosa snow-capped on right. View from the top of Rushes Pass with Lottering River visible in the valley below. Keurbos Hut is situated in the indigenous forest on middle left side of image

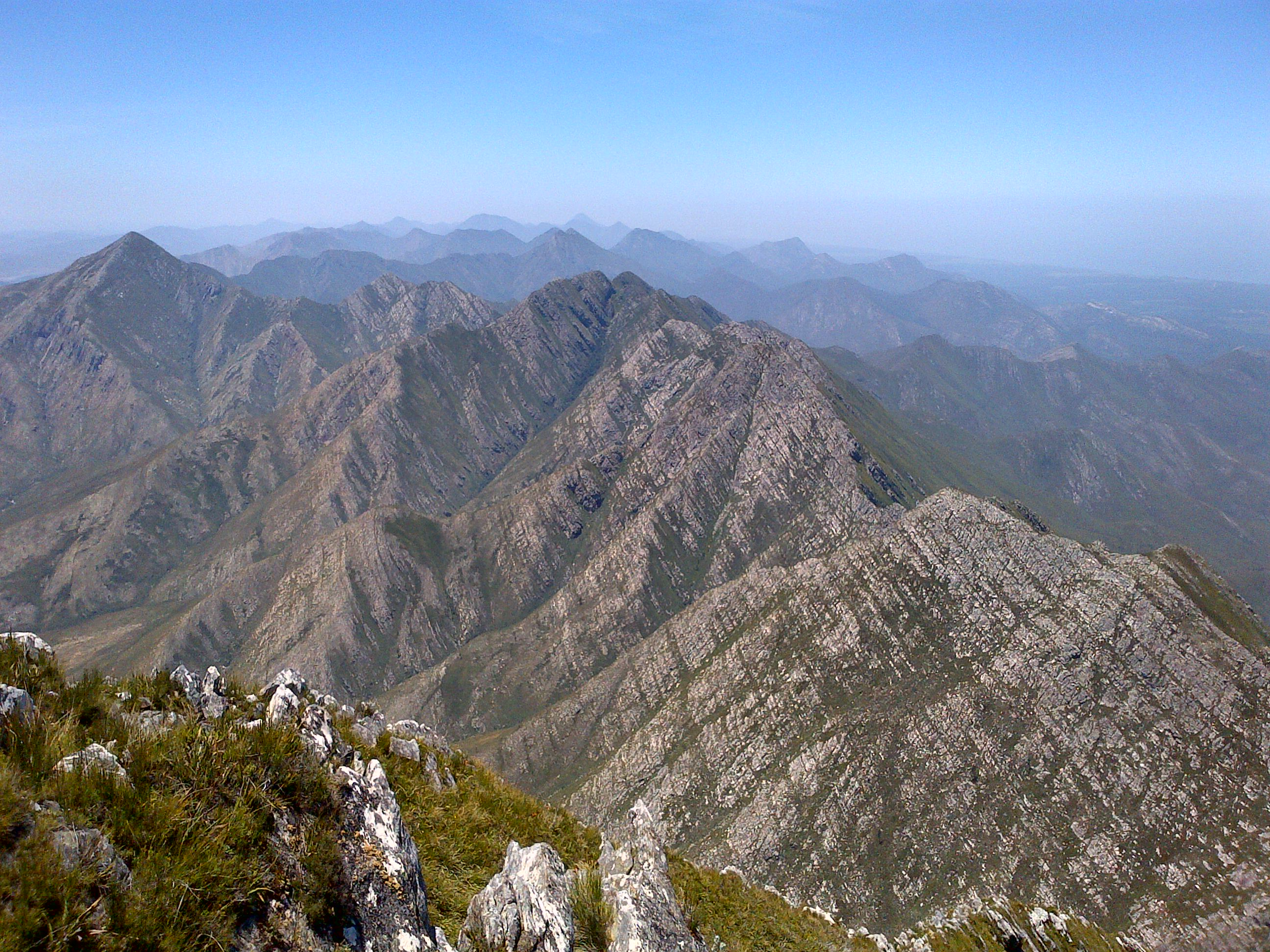
View east along the Tsitsikamma Mountains from Formosa Peak.

The peak was first mapped in 1576 during a voyage by the Portuguese navigator and cartographer, Manuel de Mesquita Perestrelo, when his ship put in at Plettenberg Bay, which he named Bahia Formosa or "beautiful bay". The peak, which is visible from the bay, had been named Formosa by the earlier Portuguese explorer, Bartolomeu Dias, in 1488. This was corrupted to Moses, a name still used for the region north of the mountain. Perestrelo, a survivor of the 1554 wrecking of the Portuguese carrack, the São Bento off Msikaba on the Wild Coast, wrote an account of the disaster.

Because of its elevation and sweeping views, Formosa Peak is a popular hiking destination, the normal road approach being from the north via Langkloof and farm tracks. Although not technically difficult and requiring only steep scrambling, the hiking route follows a narrow ridge with precipitous drops on either side and along some sections, a fall would prove fatal. A recent death on 2 January 2013 was that of Ken Webb, a 72-year-old experienced hiker from Plettenberg Bay, who fell while descending the mountain.
