= Manuel de Mesquita Perestrelo =

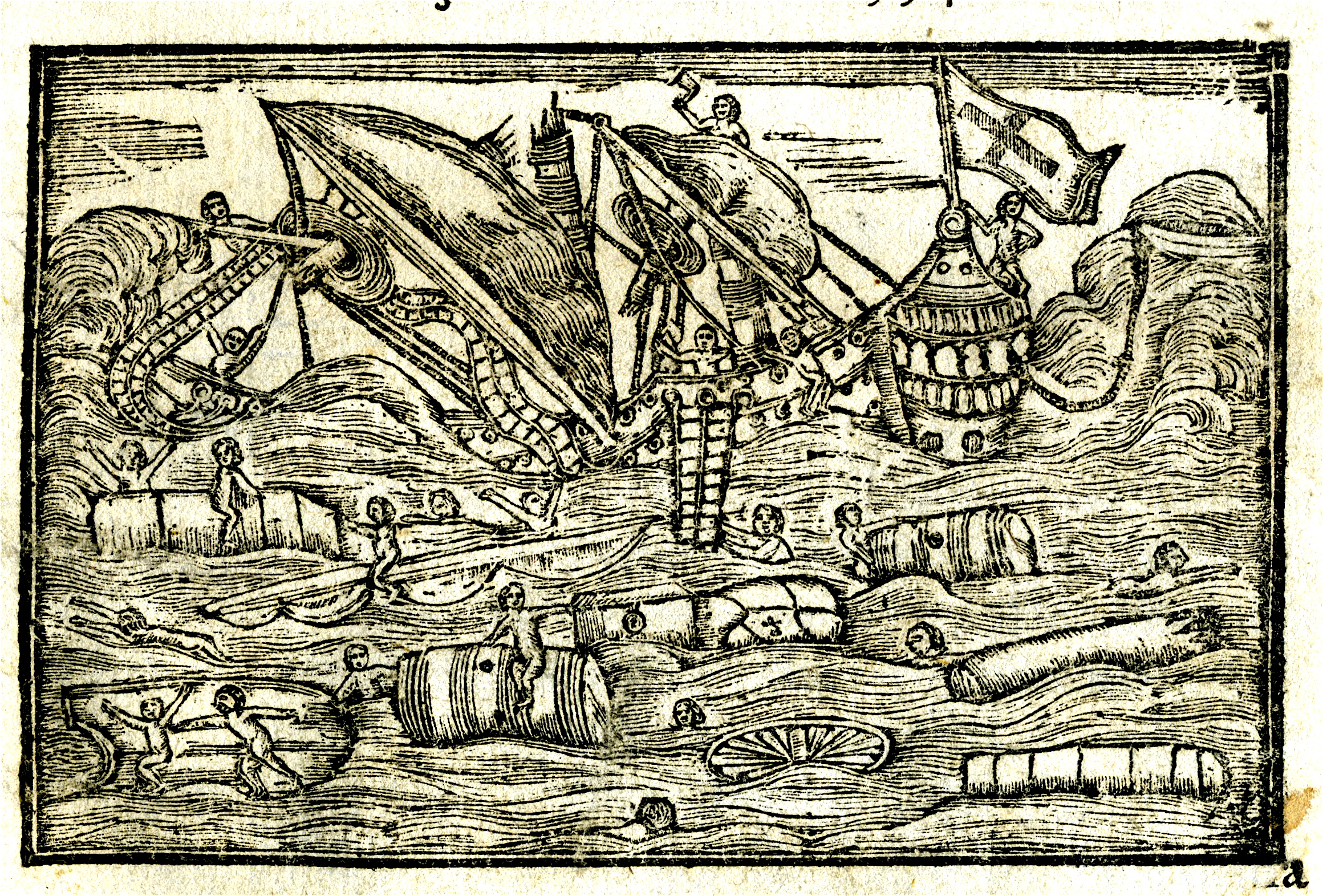
Woodcut depicting the São Bento shipwreck of 1554

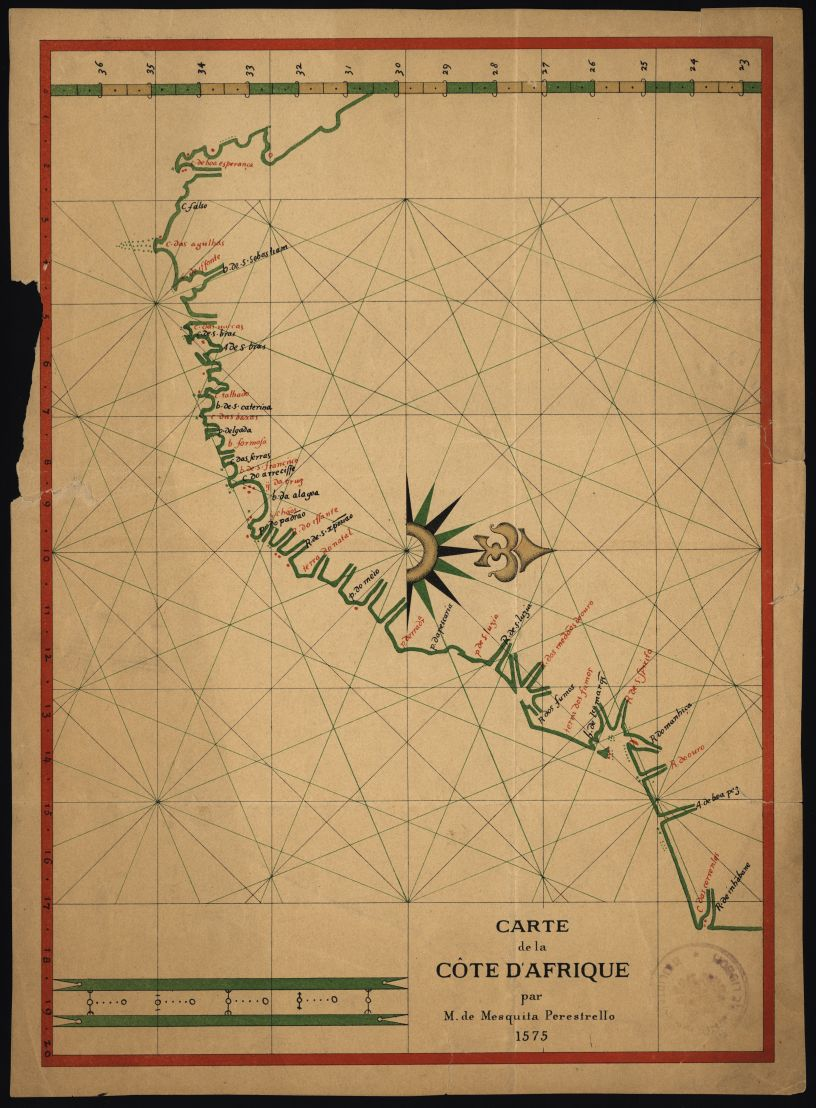
1575 map of Southern African coastline from Cape of Good Hope to Inhambane

Manuel de Mesquita Perestrelo (c. 1510, Santo Estêvão - c. 1580, Santo Estêvão) was a Portuguese navigator and cartographer.

The Perestrelo family is traced back to Filippo Pallestrelli, from Piacenza in Lombardy. Pallestrelli settled in Lisbon in 1437, part of the retinue of Eleanor of Aragon, Queen of Portugal, who married Edward I of Portugal. Pallestrelli's descendants became the ancient seafaring family of Perestrelo, with respected positions in the Portuguese court, and having their own coat of arms. Christopher Columbus had married Filipa Moniz Perestrelo from this family. The Perestrelo family controlled much of the private trade in Goa, Cochin, Ormus and Malacca, a lucrative trade in spices, condiments, carpets and clothes, realising great profits in the markets of Lisbon, Genoa and Venice.

Manuel made numerous trips to India from 1547 onwards. Returning from Cochin on one of these voyages aboard the carrack São Bento, he was shipwrecked at the Mbhashe River mouth, north of the Great Fish River, on Easter 24 April 1554. He was one of only 64 survivors who reached Inhambane on foot - the ship had carried a total of 473 crew members and passengers - only 23 were finally picked up. Perestrelo wrote an account of the disaster, "Naufragio da não São Bento", published in Coimbra in 1564, which was subsequently included in História trágico-marítima, a collection of Portuguese shipwreck narratives by Bernardo Gomes de Brito.

In 1575, Perestrelo was commissioned to chart the Southern African coastline from the Cape of Good Hope to Cape Correntes, paying particular attention to safe anchorages. This assignment he carried out between 22 November 1575 and 28 January 1576, returning to Mozambique on 13 March 1576. His report includes 8 panoramas of the horizon viewed from sea, starting with Cape Agulhas.

Places he marked on his chart were Cape da Boa Esperança, Cape False, Cape Agulhas, Cape Infanta, St Sebastian Bay, Cape St Blaize (Cabo de São Bras = Mossel Bay), Ponta Delgada (Point Slender = Robberg), Formosa Bay, Formosa Peak, St Francis Bay, Cabo de Arrecife (Cape Recife) and St Lucia (landed there on 13 December 1575, day of the Feast of Santa Lucia).
