= De Vlugt =

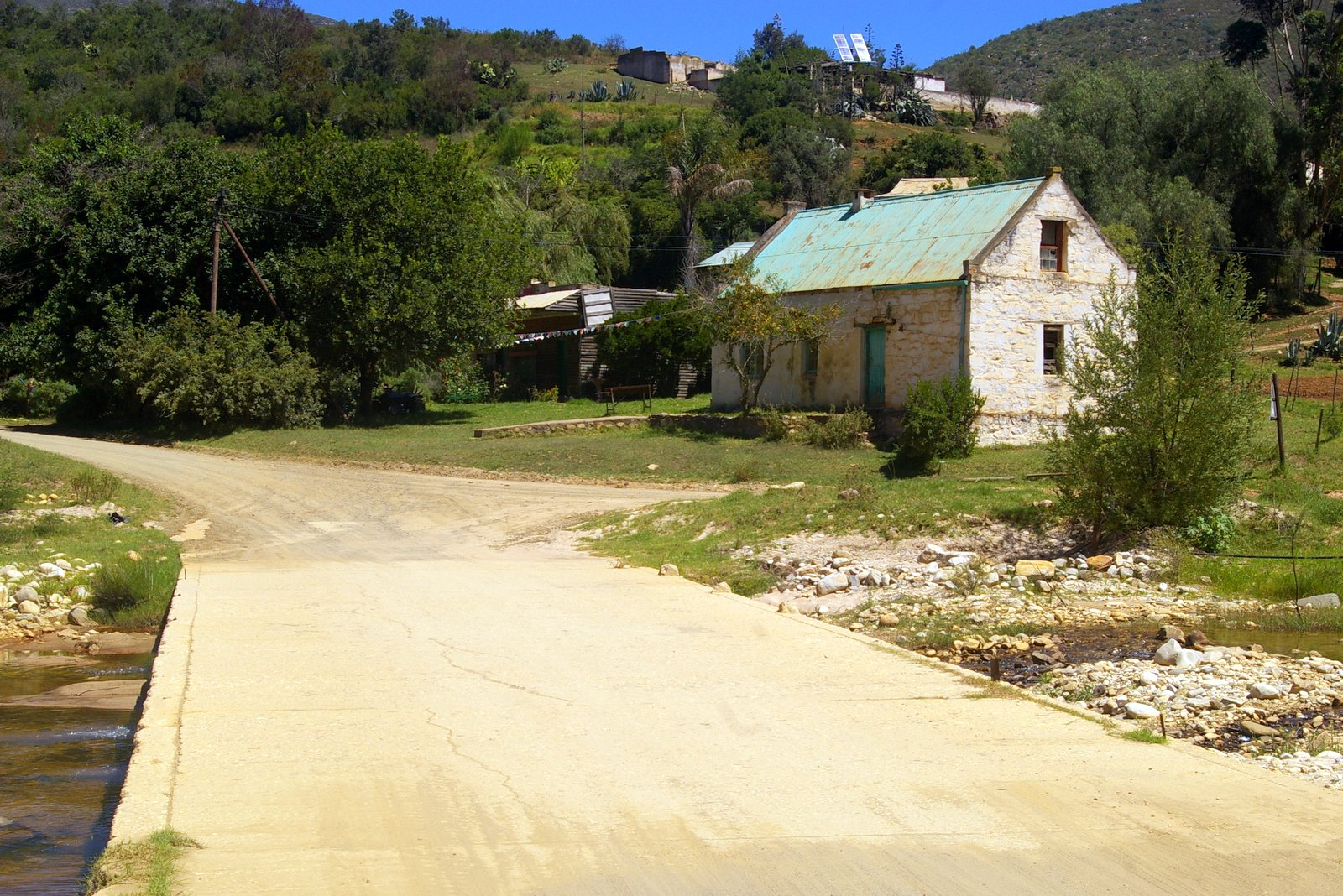
- Keurbooms River crossing at De Vlugt

- Location within Western Cape Location within South Africa
- Coordinates: 33.817°S 23.182°E
- Country: South Africa
- Province: Western Cape
- District: Garden Route
- Municipality: George

Population (2011)
  - Total: 243

Racial Makeup (2011)
  - Coloured: 83.13%
  - White: 12.76%
  - Other: 4.12%

First Languages (2011)
  - Afrikaans: 88.07%
  - English: 7.83%
  - Other: 4.12%
- Time zone: UTC+2 (SAST)

De Vlugt is a town in George Local Municipality in the Western Cape province of South Africa.

De Vlugt is situated on the banks of the Keurbooms River, approximately 55 km north of Knysna. It originated as a construction camp for the 270 convicts who built the Prince Alfred Pass in 1861. Later a small community emerged around the camp.
