= São João (1551) =

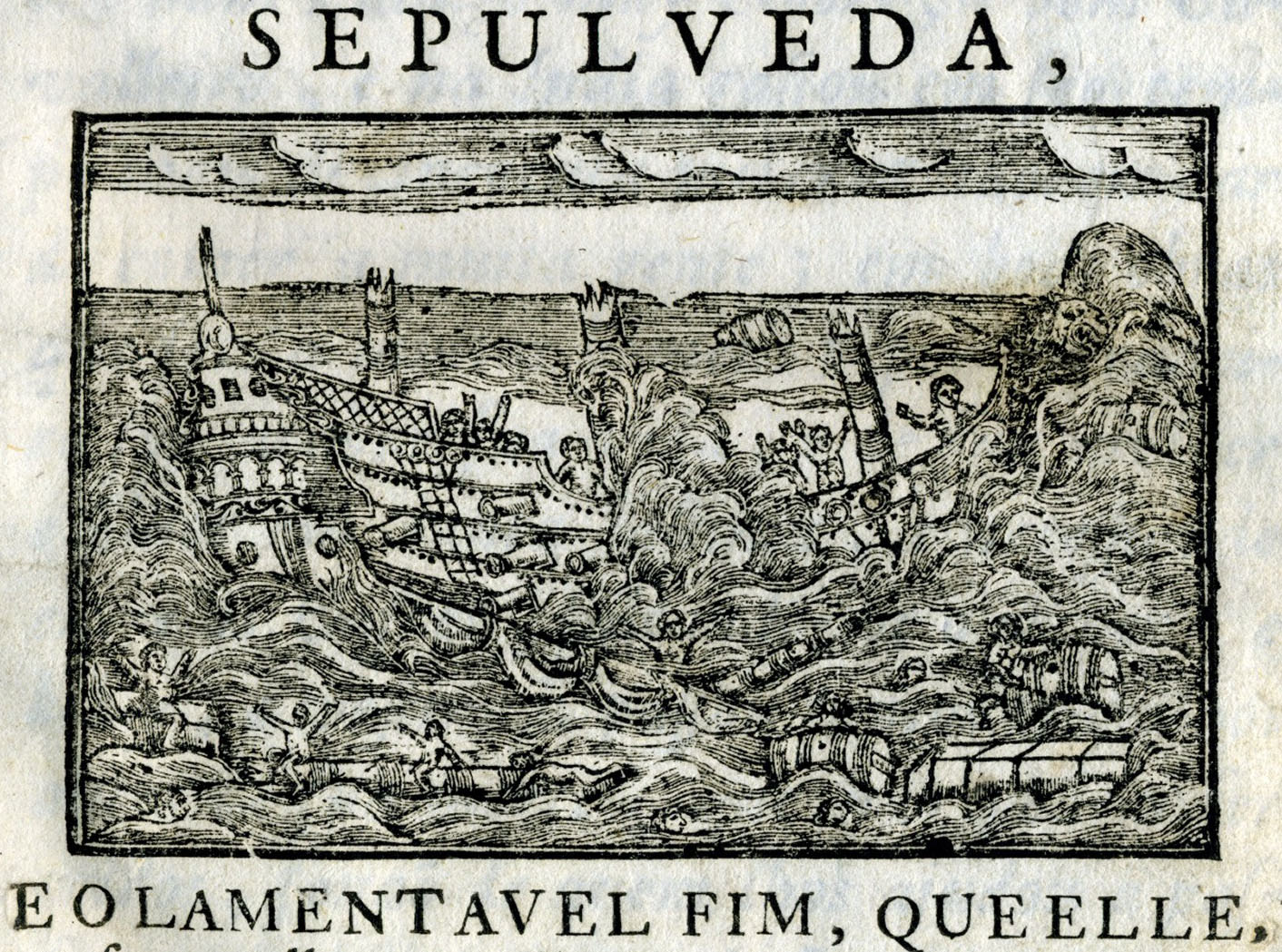
Wreck of "Galeão Grande S. João" depicted in Bernardo Gomes de Brito's História trágico-marítima, 1735.

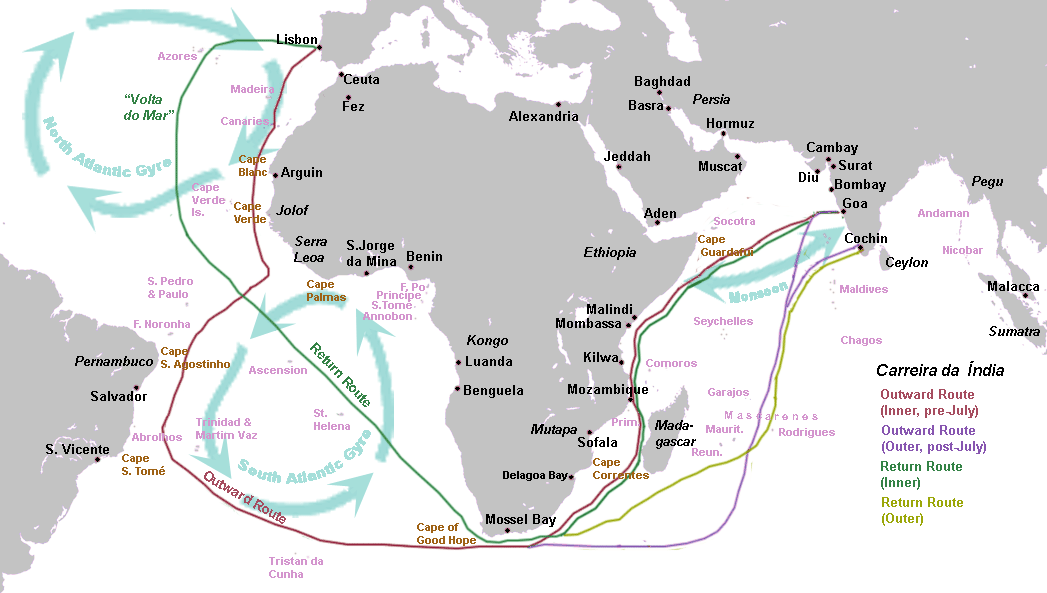
Outward and return voyages of the Portuguese India Armadas (Carreira da Índia).

São João was a Portuguese carrack or "great galleon" launched around 1551 that was wrecked off the coast of Natal in 1552.

São João under captain Manuel de Sousa Sepúlveda was on the Carreira da Índia trade route from Cochin to Lisbon when she was severely damaged on storms approaching the Cape of Good Hope. On 8 June 1552, attempting to turn back towards Mozambique, the ship stranded north of the mouth of the Inhlanhlinhlu River at Port Edward, South Africa.

110 people were lost in the wreck but 500 people survived and attempted an arduous land journey to the nearest Portuguese settlement at Maputo, about 600 kilometres north.

Only about 25 people survived the trek, before being rescued by a passing Portuguese vessel. The dead included captain Sepúlveda and his wife Dona Leonor, daughter of the governor of Portuguese India Garcia de Sá.

Crew member Álvaro Fernandes recounted the events and the pamphlet História da muy notável perda do galeão grande São João (circa 1555-6) gave a popular account of the tragedy. The wreck was featured in Bernardo Gomes de Brito's História trágico-marítima of 1735 and in Portuguese Voyages.

A memorial at Port Edward marks the site of the wreck.

== See also ==
- São Bento (carrack), wrecked off Natal in 1554
