= Tsitsikamma River =

River in the Eastern Cape, South Africa

- Location of the Tsitsikamma River's mouth
- Etymology: From the Khoekhoe language tjisi, meaning ten, and ǁamma, meaning water. Other meanings are 'place of much water' and 'waters begin'.

Location
- Country: South Africa
- Province: Eastern Cape

Physical characteristics
- Source
  - location: Tsitsikamma Mountains
  - elevation: 600 m (2,000 ft)
- Mouth: Indian Ocean
  - location: Huisklip Beach
  - coordinates: 34°03′35″S 22°14′33″E
  - elevation: 0 m (0 ft)

The Tsitsikamma River (Afrikaans: Tsitsikammarivier) is a small river at the western end of the Eastern Cape coast, South Africa. It is part of the Fish to Tsitsikama Water Management Area.

== Course ==
It is a small permanent river that has its sources in the Tsitsikamma Mountains. Initially it flows southwards, then it flows southeastwards, parallel to the coast for most of its course, bending southwestwards only 3 km from its mouth in Huisklip Beach.

== See also ==
- Tsitsikamma National Park
- List of rivers of South Africa
- List of reservoirs and dams in South Africa
