= Kromme Dam =

Churchill Dam
- Interactive map of Churchill Dam
- Official name: Churchill Dam
- Location: Eastern Cape, South Africa
- Coordinates: 34°0′4″S 24°29′1″E
- Opening date: 1943
- Owner: Nelson Mandela Bay Municipality

Dam and spillways
- Type of dam: multi-arch
- Impounds: Kromme River
- Height: 39 m
- Length: 247 m

Reservoir
- Creates: Churchill Dam Reservoir
- Total capacity: 33 282 000 m³
- Surface area: 253 ha

Churchill Dam, is a multi-arch type dam located at the Kromme River (sometimes spelled Krom River), near Kareedouw, Eastern Cape, in South Africa. It was established in 1943 and its main purpose is for municipal and industrial usage.

== Location ==
Churchill Dam lies east-southeast of Kareedouw, south of the path of the Langkloof Valley (R62 road), and on the northern slopes of the Kareedouw Mountains. The dam is 100 km west of Gqeberha, at 34° 00' S, 24° 29' E.

== Dimension ==
The dam has a capacity of 35 million m³, is 43 m high, and has a maximum reservoir area of 2,492 km^{2} and a 12-m lock. Gravity-based pipelines bring the water to the city.

== History ==
Port Elizabeth grew rapidly in the 1930s. George Begg, the City Engineer, suggested building a dam on the Krom, the closest river with plentiful and good-quality water. Although construction began in 1936, it would not be finished until after World War II. In 1942, it was decided to name the dam after Sir Winston Churchill in honor of his prominent role in that war. Gen. Jan Smuts dedicated it in 1948.

== Spoorbek ==
As the dam filled, the waters covered Hendrik Spoorbek's farm (known as Spoorbek's Land).

== Floods ==
The Churchill Dam and the Impofu Dam help control periodic floods of the Krom River. These have historically damaged fields and building on the banks and near the mouth of the river.

== See also ==
- List of reservoirs and dams in South Africa
- List of rivers of South Africa

== Bibliography ==
- Logie, Bartle (1999). Governor's travels. A journey along the Kouga/Tsitsikamma coast. Hunters Retreat: Bluecliff. ISBN 0-620-24152-7
- www.dwa.gov.za
