= Baviaanskloof River =

River in South Africa

- Location of the Baviaanskloof River mouth

Location
- Country: South Africa
- Province: Eastern Cape, Western Cape

Physical characteristics
- Mouth: Kouga River
  - location: Confluence
  - coordinates: 33°39′57″S 24°23′30″E
  - elevation: 165 m (541 ft)
- Length: 80 km (50 mi)

The Baviaanskloof River is a river flowing through the Cape Fold Mountains of the Western Cape and eventually Eastern Cape provinces of South Africa. The river's origin is in the eastern extremity of the Little Karoo, and follows a valley between these mountains eastwards. It ends at a confluence with the Kouga River, some 80 km from its source.

It is flanked by the Baviaanskloof Mountains to the north and the Kouga Mountains to the south, and it receives numerous small tributaries from both. Agricultural settlements along the river include Studtis and Sandvlakte. The valley is situated about 35 km north of the Langkloof, which is comparable though larger.

The Kouga River, which rises in the Langkloof has the isolated Baviaanskloof River as its major tributary. The Baviaanskloof river is part of the Fish to Tsitsikama Water Management Area.

Baviaan, meaning baboon, is a translation of the river's original Khoikhoi name, i Ncwama, also believed to mean "baboon". Beutler consequently named the river the Gomee or Baviaans. Robert Gordon however named it the Prehns River, in honour of a commander of the Cape garrison.

== See also ==
- Baviaanskloof Mega Reserve
