= História trágico-marítima =

Portuguese ship disaster chronicle

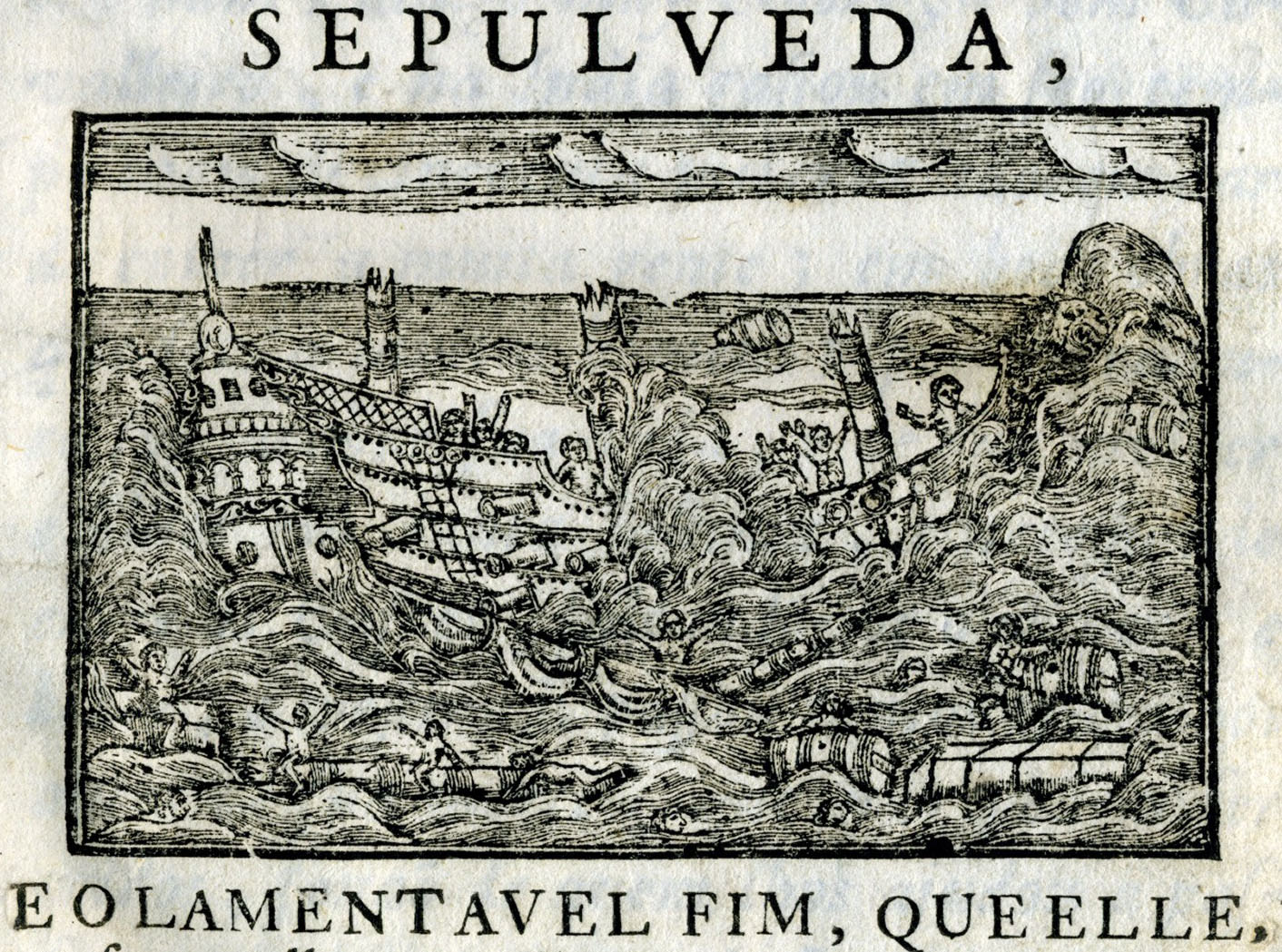
Wreck of "Galeão Grande S. João", a page from Bernardo Gomes de Brito's Historia Trágico-Marítima, 1735.

The História trágico-marítima (trans. Tragic History of the Sea) is a famous 18th-century collection of narrative accounts of the travails and wrecks of several Portuguese ships, principally carracks (naus) on the India run between 1552 and 1602, and the oft-harrowing stories of their survivors.

== Publication ==
The accounts (some of which had been previously published as pamphlets) were collected by historian Bernardo Gomes de Brito and published in two volumes in 1735 and 1736. It is said that Brito had enough material to publish five volumes, but ended up only publishing two.

The original title of Brito's collection was História trágico-marítima, em que se escrevem chronologicamente os naufragios que tiveram as naus de Portugal, depois que se poz em exercício a Navegação da Índia., published in Lisbon by the Off. da Congregação do Oratório, volume I in 1735 (4° de XVI-479 pag.) and volume II in 1736 (4° de XVI-538 pag.)

Brito's original 1735-36 work contains twelve accounts, in chronological order, from 1552 to 1602.

== Continuations by other writers ==
In the course of the 18th century, several collections of other accounts of shipwrecks were published, alleging themselves to be the 'third volume' of Brito's work. Some of these latter accounts were appended to Brito's original in a multi-volume 1904-1909 edition of the História prepared by Gabriel Pereira.

== Volume I ==
1. The wreck the great galleon, São João, captained by Manoel de Sousa Sepulveda, off the coast of Natal, South Africa in 1552. (orig. pub. 1554)
2. The wreck of the nau São Bento of Fernão d'Alvares Cabral, admiral of the India armada of 1553, off the Mbhashe River mouth in 1554. (written by Manuel de Mesquita Perestrelo, orig. pub. 1564)
3. The wreck of the nau Conceição captained by Francisco Nobre, off Peros Banhos in 1555. (written by Manoel Rangel, prev. unpub.)
4. The travails of the naus Aguia and Garça, carrying former governor D. Francisco Barreto from India in 1559 (written by Fr. Manuel Barradas, including a description of Colombo, prev. unpub.)
5. The wreck of the nau Santa Maria da Barca, captained by D. Luis Fernandes de Vasconcellos, in the Mozambique Channel, on returning from India, in 1559. [prev. unpub]
6. The wreck of the nau São Paulo, captained by Ruy de Mello da Camera, lost off Sumatra in 1560 (written by Henrique Dias, including a description of Sumatra, prev. unpub.)

== Volume II ==
1. The travails of the nau Santo Antonio, captained by Jorge de Albuquerque Coelho, attacked and seized by French corsairs when returning from Pernambuco, Brazil, in 1565 (written by Bento Teixeira Pinto, orig. pub. 1601)
2. The wreck of the nau Santiago, captained by Fernão de Mendonça, off the Bassas da India (Mozambique Channel) in 1585 (written by Manoel Godinho Cardozo, orig. pub. 1602).
3. The wreck of the nau São Thomé, captained by D. Paulo de Lima, off the 'Terra dos Fumos' (southern Mozambique), in 1589 (written by Diogo do Couto, 1611).
4. The wreck of the Santo Alberto, captained by Julião de Faria Cerveira, off 'Penedo das Fontes' (Kwaaihoek, South Africa) in 1593. (written by João Baptista Lavanha)
5. The travails of the nau São Francisco, captained by Vasco da Fonseca, returning from Brazil, drifted to Puerto Rico in 1596 (written by Fr. Gaspar Afonso, orig. pub. 1597)
6. The battles of the galleon Santiago against the Dutch at Saint Helena in 1602, and the nau Chagas against the English at the Azores in 1594 (written by Melchior Estacio de Amaral, orig. pub. 1602)

The História trágico-marítima was a popular success in Portugal, and numerous abridgements and summaries modernizing the language were produced for Portuguese schools. English translations of some of these accounts were published by Charles Ralph Boxer (1959, 1968).

== In the arts ==
The Portuguese composer Fernando Lopes-Graça composed a work based on the text for baritone voice and orchestra in 1942.

== See also ==
- Portuguese India Armadas

== Sources ==
- Bernardo Gomes de Brito, 1735-36 História trágico-marítima, em que se escrevem chronologicamente os naufragios que tiveram as naus de Portugal, depois que se poz em exercício a Navegação da Índia., Lisbon: Off. da Congregação do Oratório.
- Gabriel Pereira, editor, 1904–09, História trágico-marítima, compilada por Bernardo Gomes de Brito, com outras noticias de naufragos, 12 volumes, Lisbon: Escriptorio.
- Boxer, C.R. (1959) The Tragic History of the Sea, 1589-1622: narratives of the shipwrecks of the Portuguese East Indiamen São Thomé (1589), Santo Alberto (1593), São João Baptista (1622), and the journeys of the survivors in South East Africa. Hakluyt Society.
- Boxer, C.R. (1968) Further selections from The Tragic History of the Sea, 1559-1565: narratives of the shipwrecks of the Portuguese East Indiamen Aguia and Garça (1559) São Paulo (1561) and the misadventures of the Brazil-ship Santo António (1565) Hakluyt Society.
- Silva, Libório Manuel (2010), A Nau Catrineta e a História Trágico-Marítima: Lições de Liderança, ISBN 978-989-615-090-7, Centro Atlântico, Portugal.
