= Andrew F.C. Turpin Dam =

- Interactive map of Andrew F.C. Turpin Dam
- Official name: Andrew F.C. Turpin Dam
- Location: Eastern Cape, South Africa
- Coordinates: 32°39′8″S 26°4′18″E
- Opening date: 1949
- Operators: Department of Water Affairs and Forestry

Dam and spillways
- Impounds: Nyara River
- Height: 15 m (49 ft)
- Length: 282 m (925 ft)

Reservoir
- Creates: Andrew F.C. Turpin Dam Reservoir
- Total capacity: 127,000 m^{3} (4,500,000 cu ft)
- Surface area: 3 ha (7.4 acres)

Andrew F.C. Turpin Dam is dam in the Nyara River, north of Bedford, Eastern Cape, South Africa. It was established in 1949.

== See also ==
- List of reservoirs and dams in South Africa
- List of rivers in South Africa
