= Impofu Dam =

- Interactive map of Impofu Dam
- Official name: Impofu Dam
- Country: South Africa
- Location: Humansdorp, Eastern Cape
- Coordinates: 34°5′45″S 24°41′1″E
- Purpose: Industrial and domestic
- Opening date: 1983
- Owner: Department of Water Affairs

Dam and spillways
- Type of dam: Earth fill dam
- Impounds: Kromme River
- Height: 75 m
- Length: 793 m

Reservoir
- Creates: Impofu Dam Reservoir
- Total capacity: 106 885 000 m³
- Surface area: 570 ha

Impofu Dam is a combined rock-fill/earth-fill type dam located on the Kromme River, near Humansdorp, Eastern Cape, South Africa. It was established in 1983 and its primary purpose is to serve for municipal and industrial use. The hazard potential of the dam construction has been ranked high (3).

== Location ==
The dam, along with the Elandsjagt water purification plant, lies just downriver from Kromme Dam. Both N2 and R102 roads cross the western portion of the dam. The road to the dam wall itself is not well-suited to passenger traffic.

== History ==
The dam was built from 1972 to 1982. In July 1983, the dam beat all expectations by filling within three days.

== Dimensions ==
The reservoir is long, narrow, and deep, with several bays. The maximum capacity 107 million m^{3} and the water is 6 km^{2}, 25 km long, and 65 km in circumference. The wall is 75 m high and 800 m long.

== Use ==
A primary source of drinking water for Port Elizabeth, the dam also prevents flood waters from engulfing farms and houses around the banks and mouth of the river. The reservoir is popular with anglers as well given the 5 fish species found there. A slipway is available for boaters.

== See also ==
- List of reservoirs and dams in South Africa
- List of rivers of South Africa

== Bibliography ==
- Logie, Bartle (1999). Governor's travels. A journey along the Kouga/Tsitsikamma coast. Hunters Retreat: Bluecliff. ISBN 0-620-24152-7
