= São Bento (carrack) =

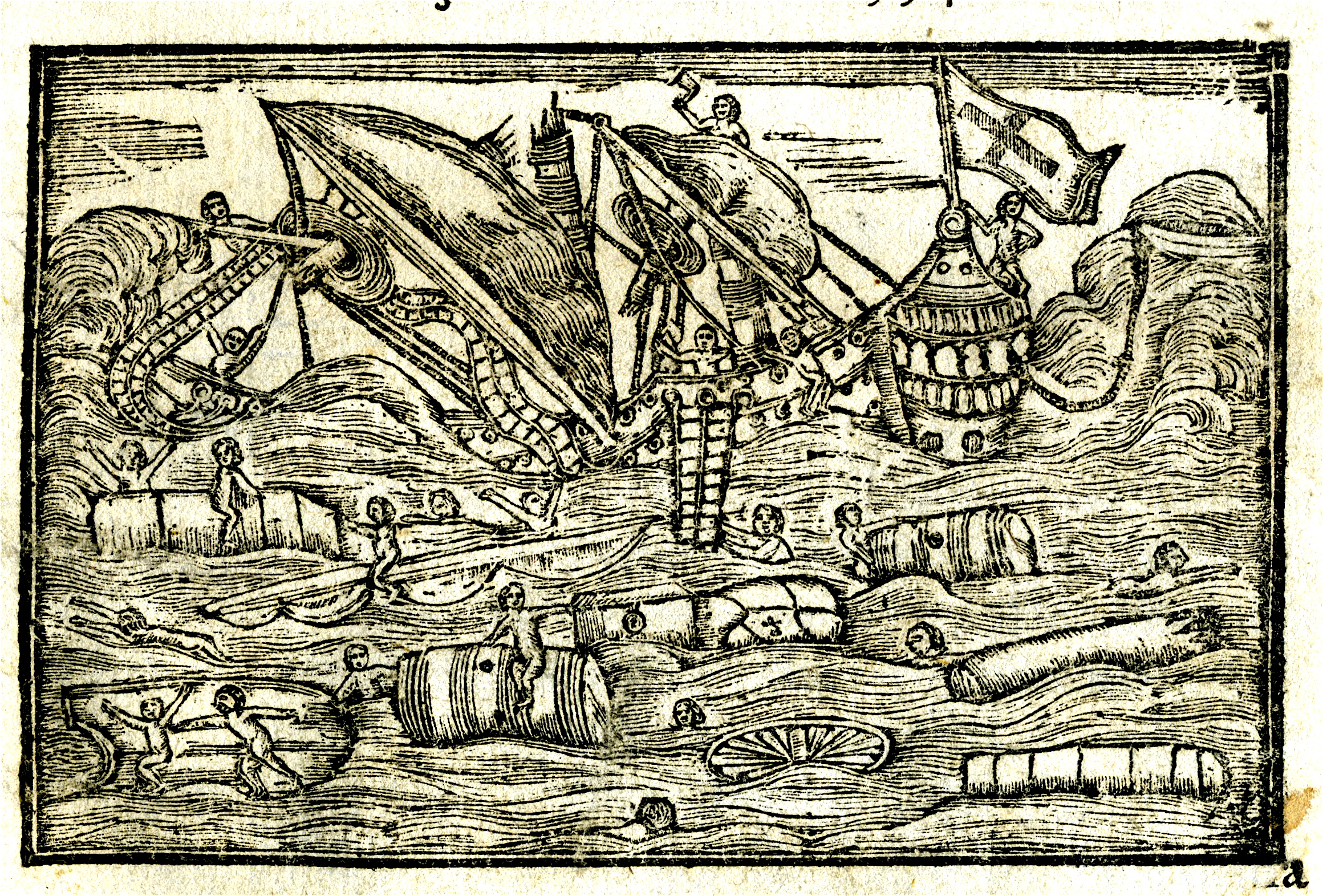
- Woodcut depicting the shipwreck of São Bento

History
- Fate: Wrecked 1554

General characteristics
- Tonnage: 900 tons

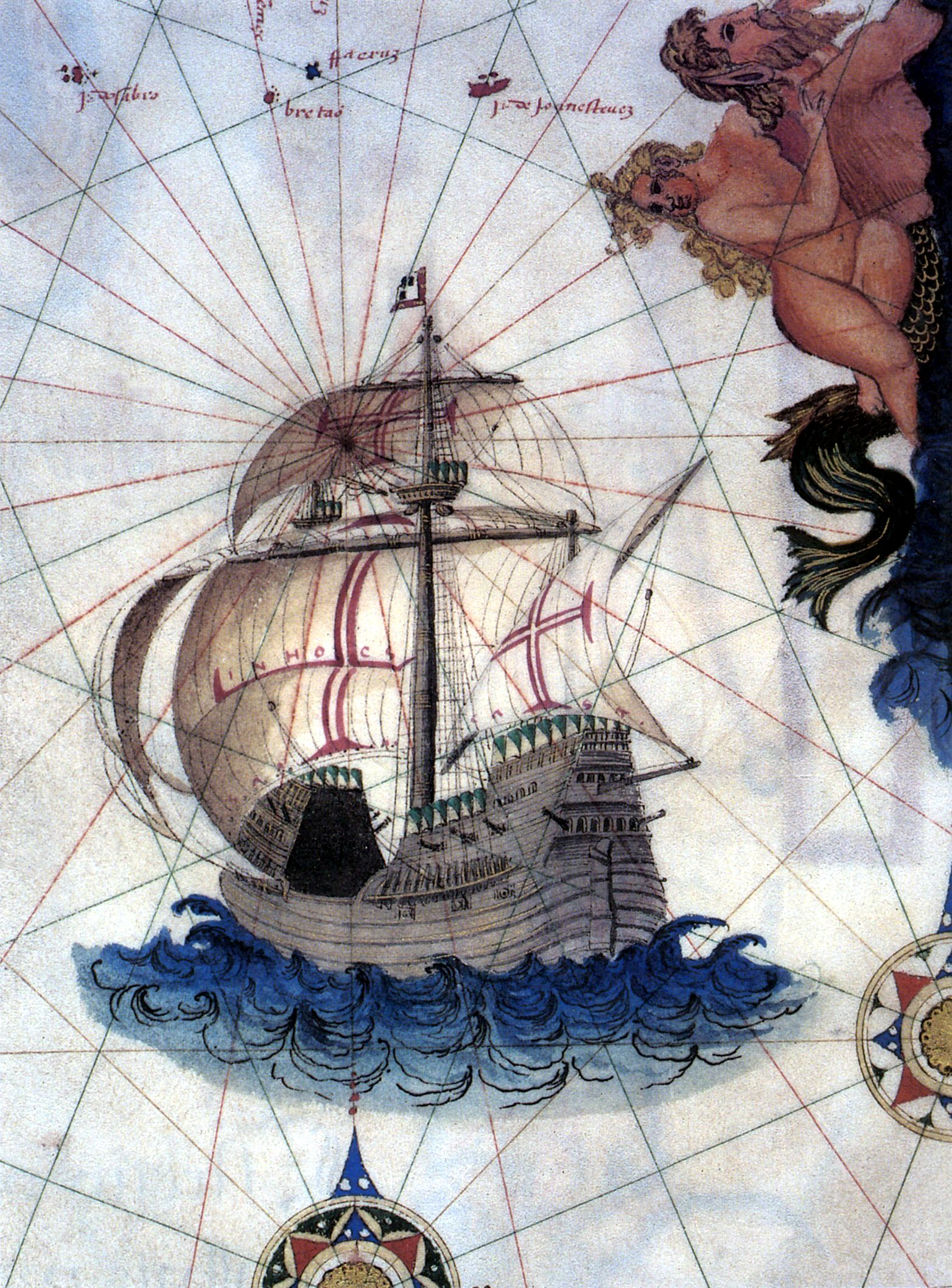
The nau (carrack) was a type of vessel that was larger than a caravel but smaller than the later galleon

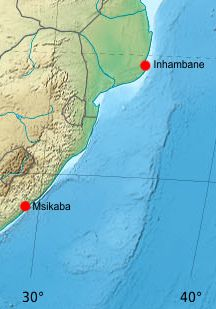

São Bento (Saint Benedict), commanded by captain Fernão de Álvares Cabral, the son of Pedro Álvares Cabral, was a Portuguese carrack of 900 tons wrecked in April 1554 near the mouth of the Msikaba River, midway between Port Edward and Port St. Johns on the Transkei coast of South Africa. The ship had left Cochin on 1 February 1554 and was en route to Lisbon with a cargo of spices, coconuts, silks, porcelain, cornelian beads, cotton cloth and other luxury goods. There are no hull remains at the site.

== Background ==
On the night of 24 April 1554, São Bento was sailing in stormy weather off the Transkei coast. The ship was in a poor state of repair and overloaded, and when she ran aground, she quickly sank at the mouth of a gully on the seaward side of the island at the river mouth, with the loss of 44 Portuguese and over one hundred slaves. Two years earlier on 10 June 1552 São João had been wrecked along the same stretch of coast at Port Edward, almost certainly accounting for the name of the nearby settlement of Port St. Johns.

The survivors, one of whom was Manuel de Mesquita Perestrelo and who later wrote an account of the disaster, made camp on the south bank of the river and put up a shelter which was "a superb lodging made of rich carpets, pieces of good cloth and silk, put to very different use from that for which they were made."

On 28 April 1554, after crossing the Msikaba River on rafts made from barrels lashed together, a party of 224 slaves and 98 Portuguese headed north along the coast to the Portuguese trading post established at Inhambane in 1534, and a distance of some 970 km (600 mi) as the crow flies from the site of the wreck. Some able-bodied men were armed with lances and swords, but there was only one musket between the lot. "Having crossed the river, we put ourselves in marching order, carrying a crucifix bound upon a lance… We arranged ourselves in single file, and set our faces towards the interior by a path made by elephants, directing ourselves towards a height where it seemed to us we might discover some settlement."

Only twenty Portuguese survivors and three slaves managed to reach safety in Mozambique.
