= Tsitsikamma Mountains =

Mountain range in Western Cape, South Africa

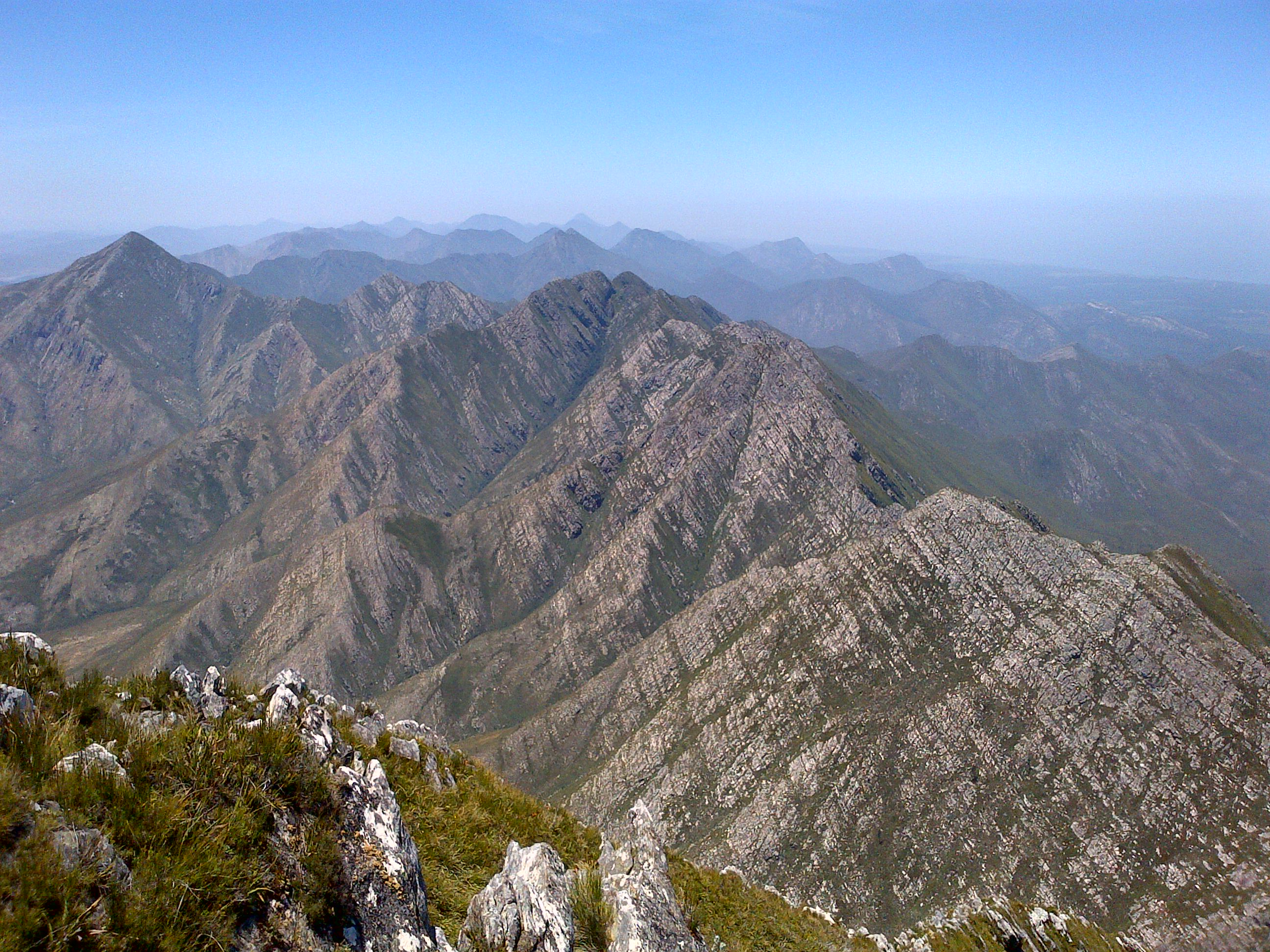
- View east along the Tsitsikamma Range from Peak Formosa

Highest point
- Peak: Peak Formosa
- Elevation: 1,675 m (5,495 ft)
- Listing: List of mountain ranges of South Africa
- Coordinates: 33°50′0″S 23°58′0″E

Dimensions
- Length: 80 km (50 mi) WNW/ESE
- Width: 30 km (19 mi) NNE/SSW

Geography
- Location within South Africa
- Country: South Africa
- Provinces: Western Cape and Eastern Cape

Geology
- Orogeny: Cape Fold Belt
- Rock age: Ordovician
- Rock type: Quartzitic sandstone

The Tsitsikamma mountains form an east-west mountain range located in the Garden Route region of the southern South African coast in the Western Cape and Eastern Cape provinces. Tsitsikamma means 'place of much water' in the Khoekhoe language.

== Physiography ==
The Tsitsikamma Range stretches just over 80 km from the Keurbooms River in the west just north of Plettenberg Bay, to Kareedouw Pass and the Eerste River in the east near the town of Kareedouw, and forms a continuous range with the Outeniqua Mountains to the west. The range consists almost exclusively of Table Mountain sandstone which is extremely erosion-resistant. Peak Formosa is the highest point in the range at 1675 m. The climate of the range is extremely mild, with temperature variations only between 10 °C and 25 °C generally and rainfall exceeding 1000 mm per annum, thus the region supports verdant fynbos and Afromontane temperate gallery forest habitats. Snow sometimes occurs on the highest peaks in winter.

The topography of the mountains is interesting, in that the range rises abruptly from the south at a very defined line that runs almost due east-west at the 34° south latitude. This is due to the very regular nature of the rise of the Table Mountain Sandstone in an anticline fold structure above the grade of the surrounding Tsitsikamma coastal plateau.

== The Region ==
The Tsitsikamma National Park lies just to the south of the range on the Indian Ocean. The region between the range and the ocean also bears the name Tsitsikamma and is characterised by some cattle farms, sparse settlements and dense Afromontane (Temperate) gallery forest. This region sits on a 200m high plateau between the mountains and steep cliffs which drop into the Indian Ocean. Bloukrans Bridge is on the border between the Eastern and Western Cape provinces, and sports the highest bungee jump in the world.

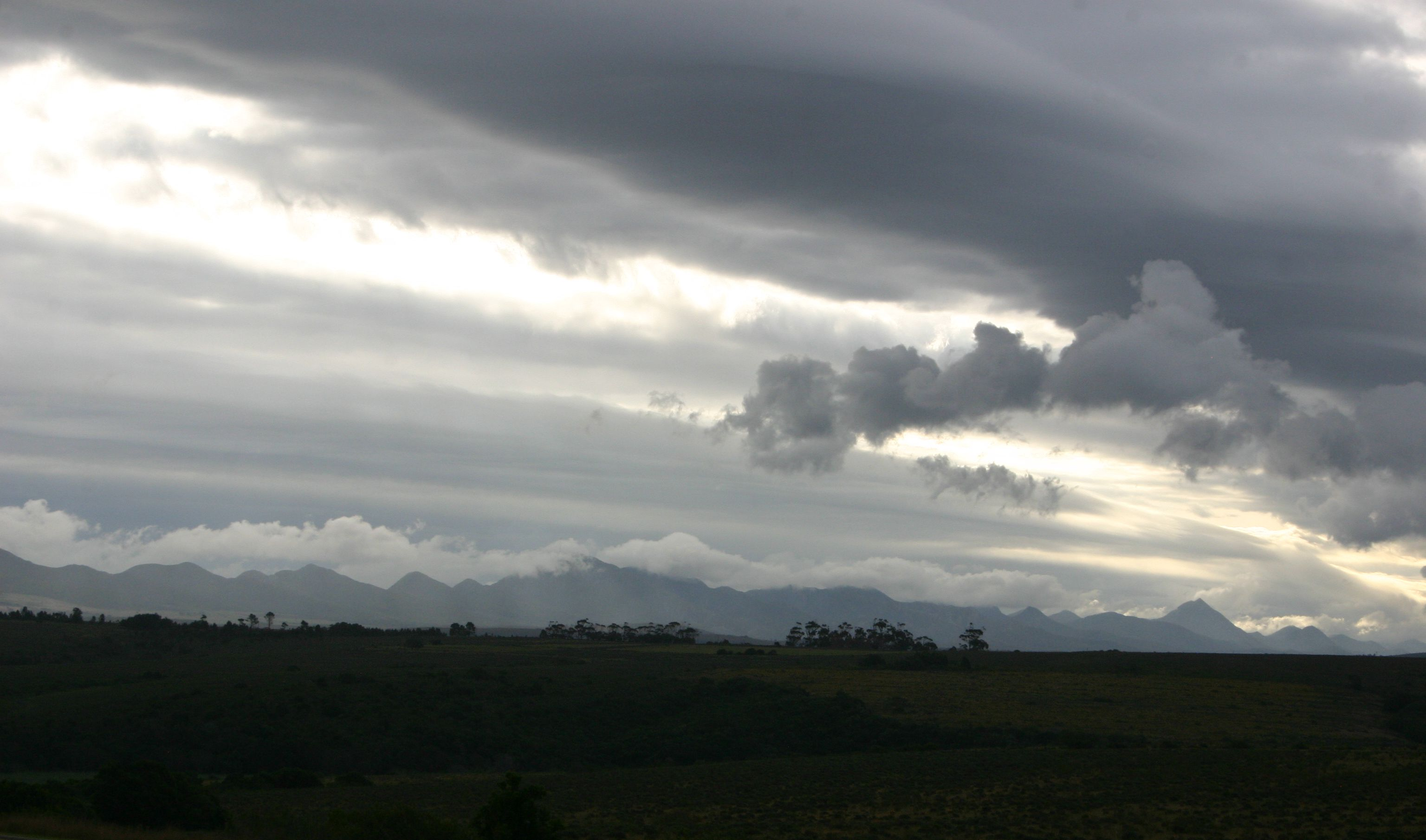
View north to Tsitsikamma Mountains - Kareedouw Pass to right of image

== See also ==
- List of mountain ranges of South Africa
- Tsitsikamma National Park
- Tsitsikamma River
