= Kouga Mountains =

Mountain range in South Africa

Coordinates: 33°37′S 23°38′E

The Kouga mountains are a mountain range on the border of the Eastern Cape and Western Cape provinces in South Africa, stretching in an east–west direction. They are part of the Cape Fold Belt, beginning just east of Uniondale and stretching further eastwards. The range separates the Baviaanskloof (to which the Kouga Mountains run parallel) and Langkloof from each other.

== Geography ==
The mountain range is about 150km long on an east-west axis parallel to the coast which is roughly 50km away. It has peaks at 1,700m with the Baviaanskloof River on its north side while the Kouga River flows below its southern side.
