= John Croumbie Brown =

- Born: 16 May 1808; Haddington, Scotland
- Died: 17 September 1895 (aged 87); Haddington, Scotland
- Education: University of Aberdeen
- Known for: Prolific author; Forestry pioneer and soil conservationist in South Africa; Hydrology research in Cape Colony
- Relatives: John Brown (grandfather)
- Scientific career
- Fields: Botany, Forestry, Soil Conservation, Hydrology
- Workplaces: London Missionary Society (St. Petersburg); Congregational Church (Cape Town); Joint Medical School; King's College, Aberdeen; Colonial Botanist (Cape Colony)

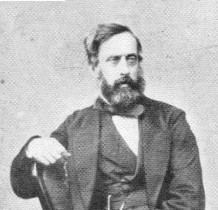

John Croumbie Brown (16 May 1808 Haddington, Scotland – 17 September 1895 Haddington) was a prolific author, minister of religion, forestry pioneer in South Africa as well as soil conservationist and hydrologist. He was the grandson of John Brown (1722–1787), the renowned Scottish theologian and author.

John Croumbie Brown received his education in Aberdeen, was later trained as a missionary, and in 1833 was sent to St. Petersburg by the London Missionary Society to mission to the British and American Church, spending four years there. From 1844 to 1848 he was in Cape Town where he took charge of the Congregational Church. Having an easy familiarity with the natural sciences, he presented a series of public lectures on scientific topics. His first lecture in November 1844 was under the aegis of the Cape Town Mental Improvement Society and was "On the discoveries of modern astronomy". This was followed by lectures on chemistry sponsored by the Institute for the Diffusion of Useful Knowledge. In 1847 he delivered lectures "On the physiology and structure of the human frame" - these lectures were subsequently published in book form in Cape Town.

Returning to Scotland, Brown served as pastor in Aberdeen in 1849, continuing with his scientific lectures, which were well received. He furthered his botanical studies, and in April 1853 took up the post of lecturer in botany at the Joint Medical School (King's College, Aberdeen), also being awarded the degree Doctor of Laws there in 1858.

In April 1863, following the death of Karl Wilhelm Ludwig Pappe, Brown took up the post of Colonial Botanist at the Cape, his duties including that of professor of botany at the South African College. He toured the Cape Colony during 1863, giving lectures in an effort to popularise botany. He opposed deforestation and veld-burning, because of the loss of soil moisture. He was consulted by the government on forestry matters, and wrote several memoirs on forestry, appending a list of South African trees, shrubs, and arborescent herbs, to his annual report for 1866. His reports also touched on agricultural issues, such as diseases in fruit trees, rust, manuring, the cultivation of various crops, experimental farms, irrigation, and Cape wines. His 1863 report included the first official record of "krimpsiekte" or Cotyledonosis in small stock, particularly goats, caused by three genera of the Crassulaceae (Cotyledon, Tylecodon and Kalanchoe). He investigated potential dam sites, and the hydrology of the country. In 1866 the post of Colonial Botanist was abolished due to shortage of funds and Brown returned to Scotland in January 1867.

Some South African botanists were critical of Brown's contributions to botanical knowledge, but the noted Irish botanist William Henry Harvey singled out Brown for praise in the preface to Volume 3 of the Flora Capensis "for his unremitting kind attention to the interests of this work, and for the zeal which he has shown, since his appointment, in endeavouring to promote the study of botany in all parts of the Colony, and among the neighbouring extra-colonial missionaries". The Cape authorities also valued his suggestions, some of which were implemented. Hence he was not regarded as an outstanding botanist, but did successfully promote interest in botany and sound methods in agriculture, forestry, and veld management.

Brown maintained his interest in the forestry and hydrology of the Cape Colony, publishing a number of valuable works. In April 1877 he addressed the Town Council of Edinburgh and the board of the Royal Scottish Arboricultural Society, advocating the establishment of a forestry school and arboretum in Edinburgh. Various unpublished manuscripts on South African agriculture, forestry and botany were lodged with the Faculty of Forestry at the University of Stellenbosch by his grandson, Dr. Eric A. Nobbs.

== Books and papers ==
- Hydrology of South Africa. London. 1875.
- Water Supply of South Africa: And Facilities for the Storage of it. Edinburgh: Oliver & Boyd. 1877.
- Forests in South Africa (Transactions of the Royal Scottish Arboricultural Society. 1881.
- Management of Crown Forests at the Cape of Good Hope Under the Old Regime and Under the New. Edinburgh: Oliver and Boyd. 1887. p. 1.
