= Krom River =

River in the Eastern Cape, South Africa

Krom River Krommerivier
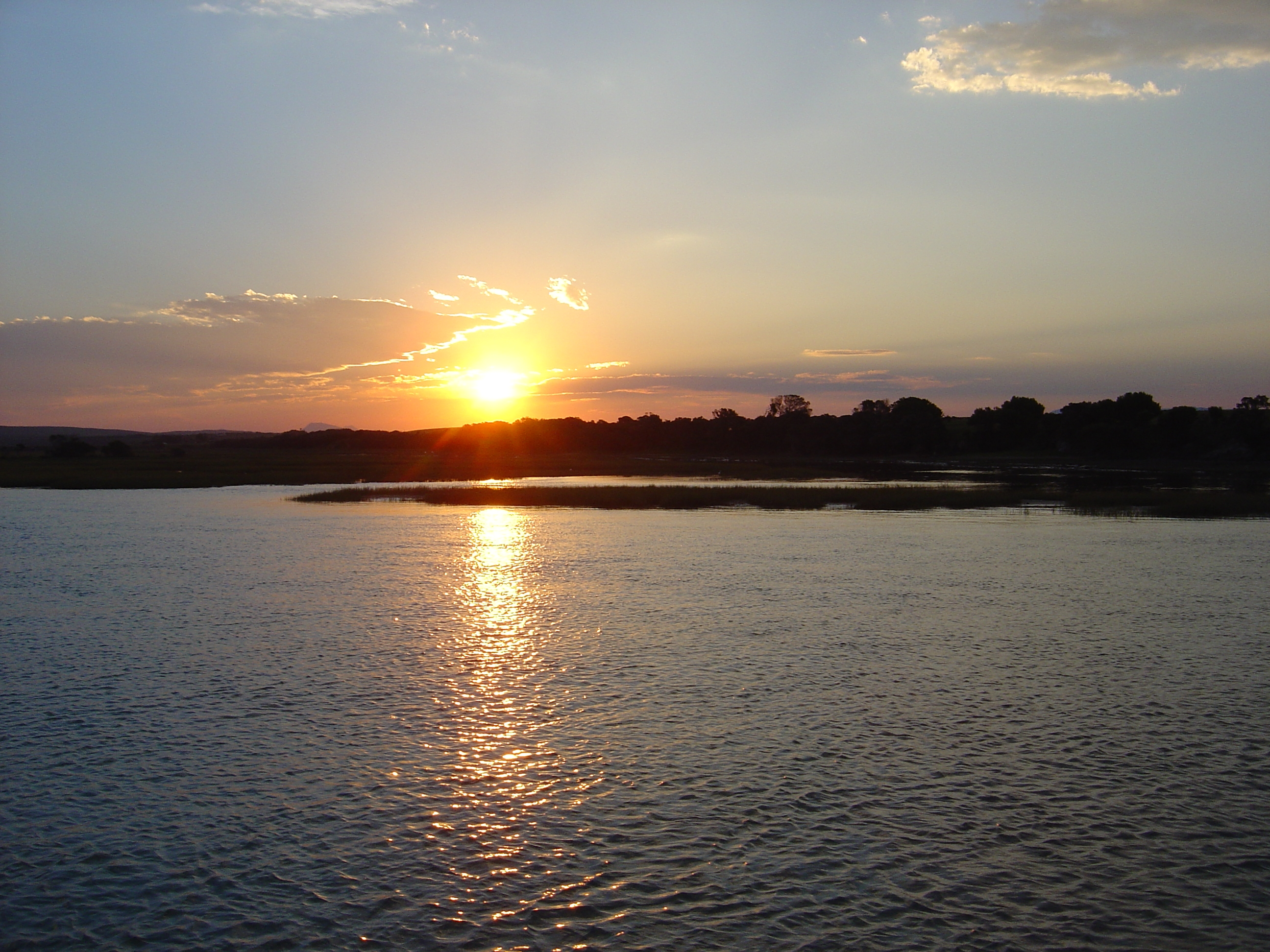
- The Krom River, St Francis Bay

- Location of the Krom River mouth
- Etymology: From "curve" in the Afrikaans language

Location
- Country: South Africa
- Province: Eastern Cape Province

Physical characteristics
- Source
  - location: Tsitsikamma Mountains, Eastern Cape, South Africa
  - elevation: 800 m (2,600 ft)
- Mouth: Indian Ocean
  - location: Sea Vista, South Africa
  - coordinates: 34°08′37″S 24°50′40″E
  - elevation: 0 m (0 ft)
- Length: 109 km (68 mi)
- Basin size: 1,085 km^{2} (419 sq mi)

Krom River or Kromme River (Afrikaans: Krommerivier) is a river in the Eastern Cape Province in South Africa. The river flows into the Indian Ocean through an estuary on the north side of St Francis Bay, west of Port Elizabeth. The Krom river flows in an ESE direction and is approximately 109 km long with a catchment area of 1,085 km^{2}.

The Churchill Dam and the Impofu Dam are dams on the Krom River. The latter is located near Humansdorp. Presently this river is part of the Fish to Tsitsikama Water Management Area.

== Ecology ==
In 1995 specimens of the Cape galaxias (Galaxias zebratus), a South African fish species endemic to the Cape Floristic Region, were found in the Krom River. Until then it had been thought that its distribution was restricted to the area between the Keurbooms and the Olifants River. Although in South Africa this relatively delicate fish is only classified as near threatened, in Australia species of the same genus were driven to extinction by competing salmonids and other introduced species of fish. Since the beginning of 2021 there have been a high number of bull sharks present in the river.

== See also ==
- List of rivers of South Africa
- List of estuaries of South Africa
