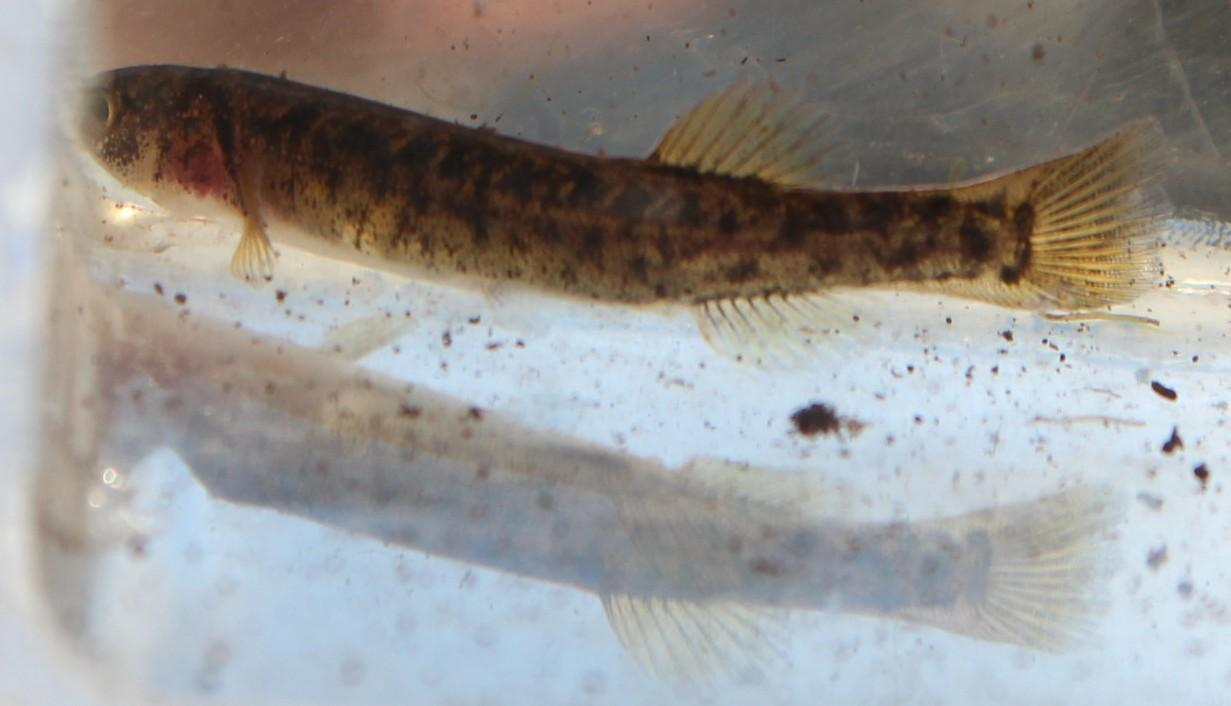

Conservation status
- Data Deficient (IUCN 3.1)

Scientific classification
- Kingdom: Animalia
- Phylum: Chordata
- Class: Actinopterygii
- Order: Galaxiiformes
- Family: Galaxiidae
- Genus: Galaxias
- Species: G. zebratus

Binomial name
- Galaxias zebratus (Castelnau, 1861)
- IUCN range, 2007
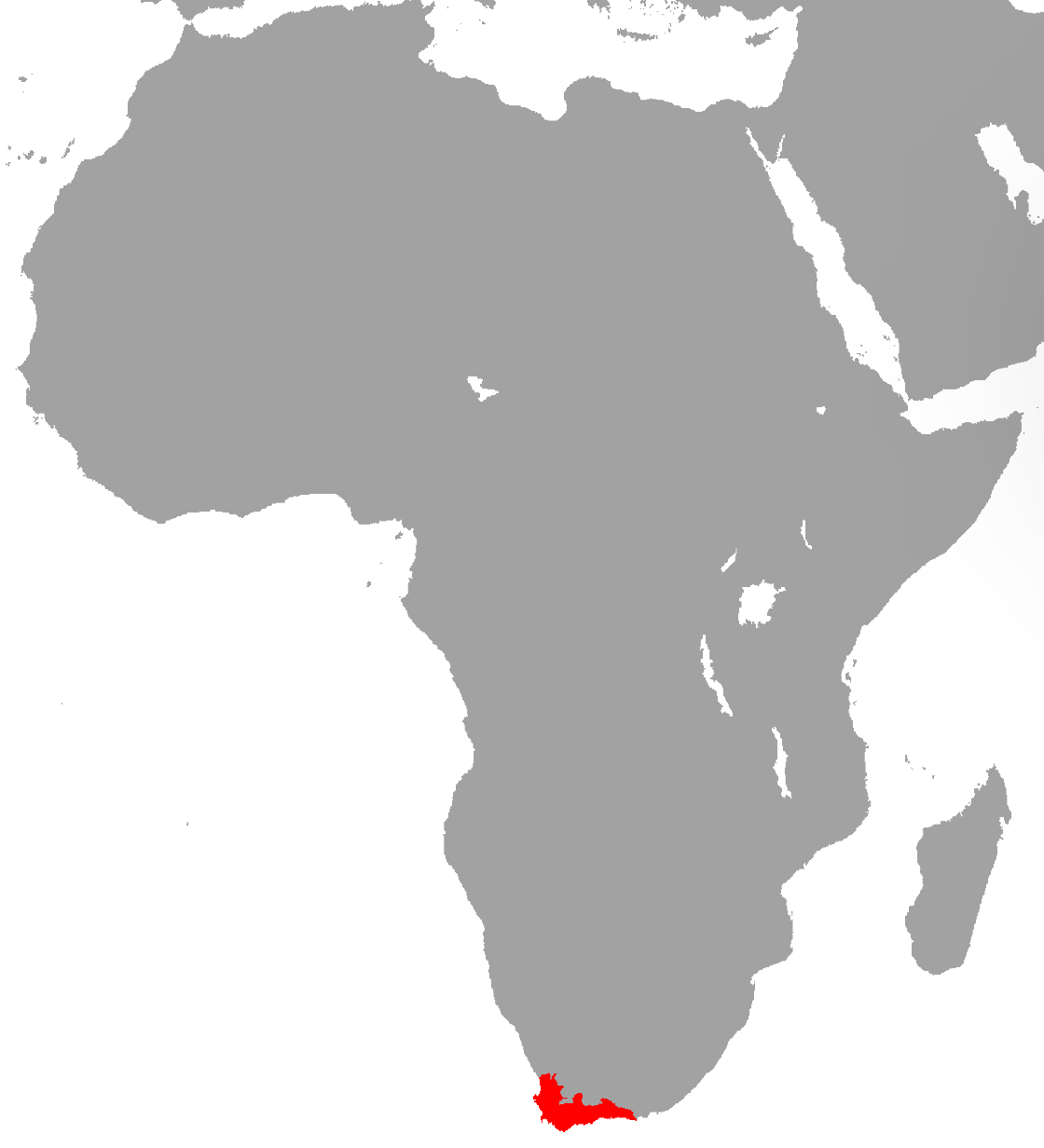

Synonyms
- Cobitis punctifer Castelnau, 1861; Cobitis zebrata Castelnau, 1861; Galaxias capensis Steindachner, 1894; Galaxias dubius Gilchrist & Thompson, 1917

= Cape galaxias =

Species of fish

The Cape galaxias (Galaxias zebratus) is a species of freshwater fish of the family Galaxiidae.

It is a small fish, rarely larger than 6 cm, that inhabits clear streams, rivers and ponds of South Africa. It shares the same habitat as imported trout and bass species and has been identified as prey. The numbers of this relatively delicate fish have declined around Cape Town. Although in South Africa it was at one time classified as near threatened, in Australia species of the same genus were driven to extinction by competing salmonids and other introduced species of fish. It is now classified as "Data Deficient" on the grounds that the taxonomic status of the species complex is unclear.

== Description ==
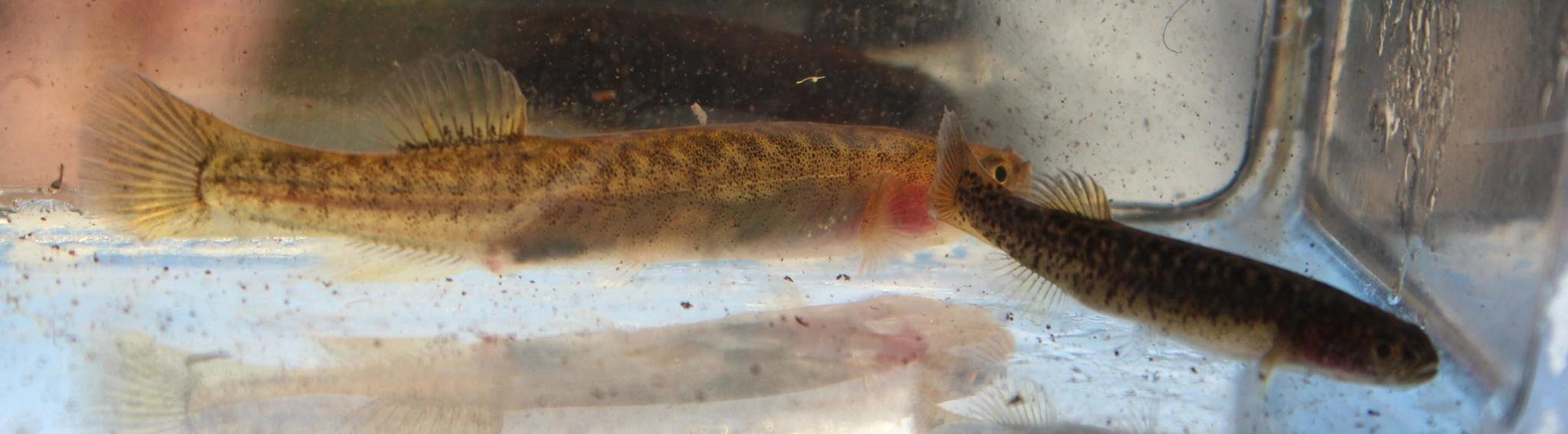

The Cape galaxias is a small slender fish with a cylindrical body and no scales. It has a single dorsal fin with 9 to 13 soft rays set well back on the body and just above the anal fin which has a similar number of rays. It is silvery in colour and the internal organs can be seen through the skin.

== Distribution and habitat ==
Genus Galaxias is restricted to the Southern Hemisphere and the Cape galaxias is unique because it is the only species of the genus found in the African continent.

It is endemic to the Western Cape region in South Africa and the first specimen caught by scientists was captured in the Cape Flats area in 1861. For a long time it was believed that the distribution of this fish species was restricted to the Western Cape, within an area ranging between the Keurbooms River and the Olifants River. However, since 1995 it has been also found in the Krom River as well as in the Gamtoos River system of the Eastern Cape. Some of the taxa in the complex are found in clear mountain streams with low dissolved mineral levels but others seem to prefer lowland streams that can be turbid and have high levels of dissolved minerals.
