= Groot River (Eastern Cape) =

River in the Eastern Cape, South Africa

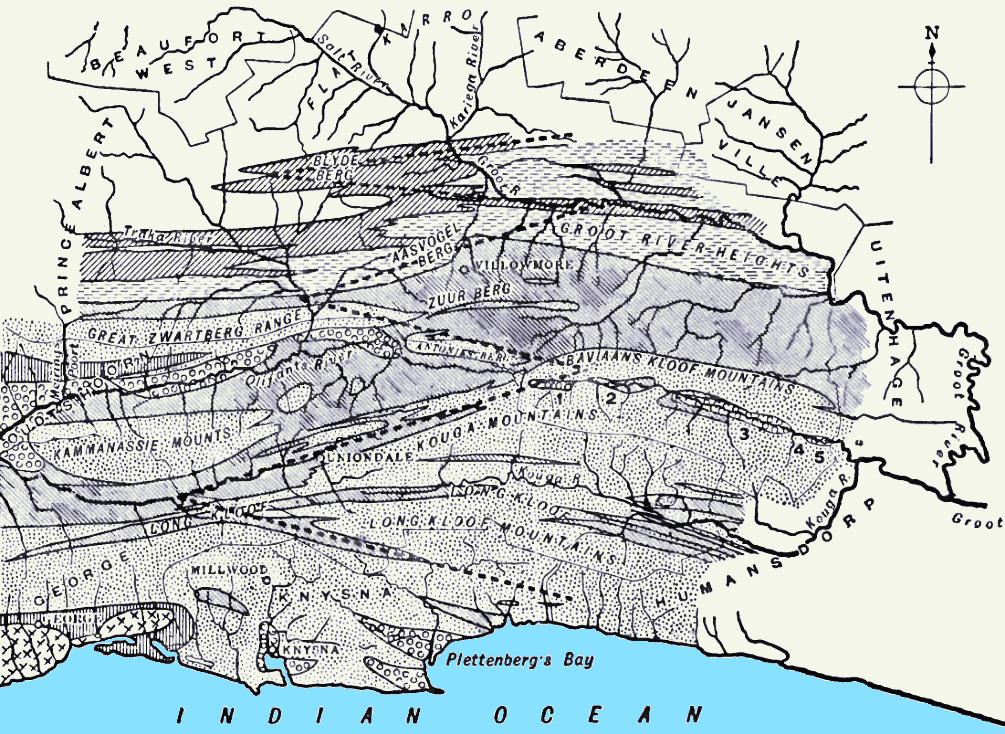

- Location of the Groot River mouth
- Etymology: From Grootrivier, meaning "big river" in the Afrikaans language

Location
- Country: South Africa
- State: Eastern Cape

Physical characteristics
- Source: _
- Source confluence: Kariega and Sout confluence
- Mouth: Gamtoos River
  - location: Confluence with Kouga River
  - coordinates: 33°44′45″S 24°36′55″E
  - elevation: 90 m (300 ft)

The Groot River is a river in the southern area of the Eastern Cape province of South Africa. It is a right tributary of the Gamtoos River. This river passes through Steytlerville.

== Course ==
The Groot River originates at a point where the Kariega River and the Sout River meet, although they enter the Beervlei Dam as the Sout River. Beyond the dam, the river becomes the Groot River, running southeast. Near the town of Steytlerville it turns slightly southwards before heading eastward again, lastly bending southwards before it joins the Kouga River to form the Gamtoos at the confluence.

== See also ==
- List of rivers of South Africa
