= Beervlei Dam =

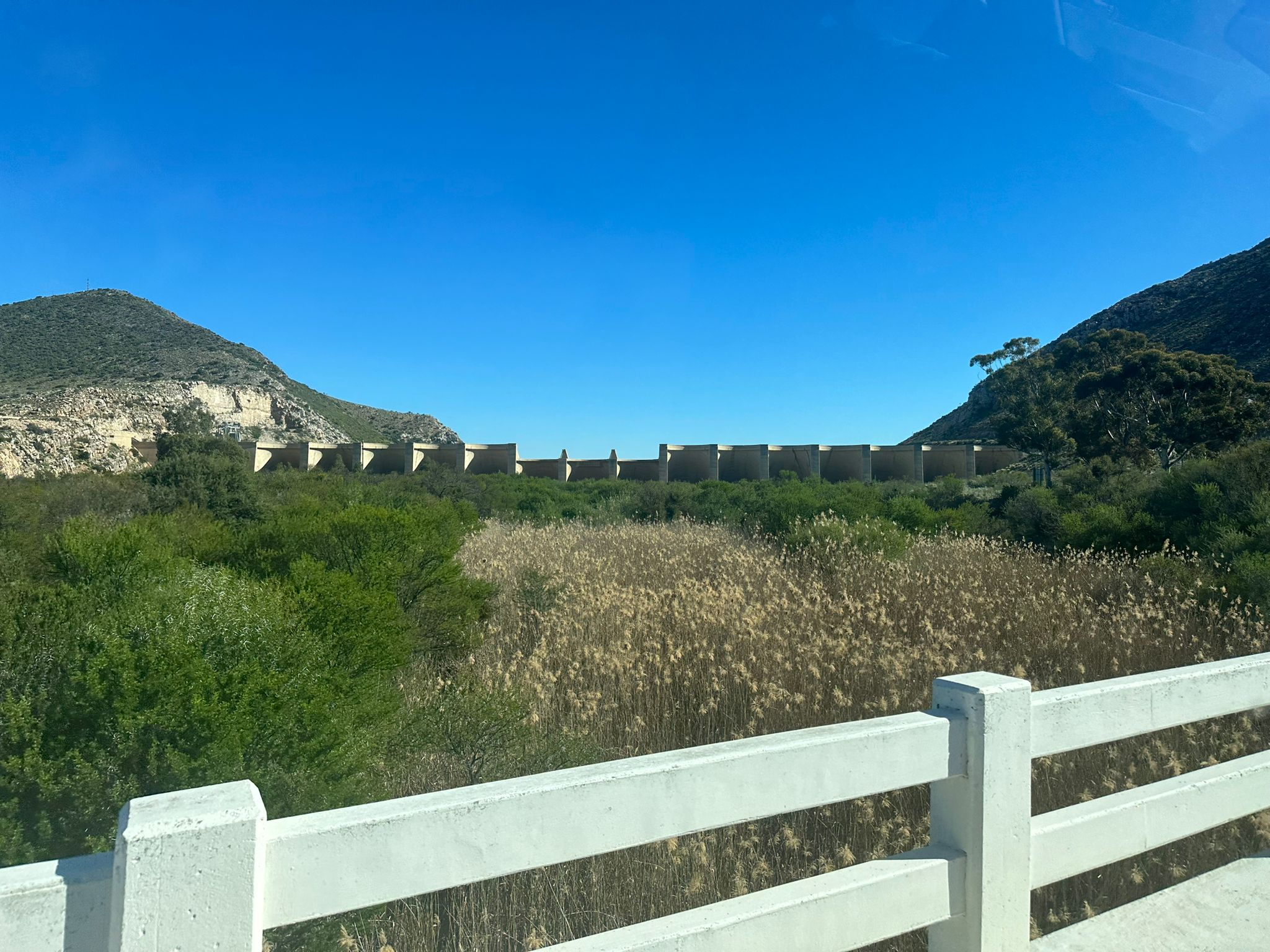
- Beervlei dam from N9-National road
- Interactive map of Beervlei Dam
- Official name: Beervlei Dam
- Location: South Africa
- Coordinates: 33°4′30″S 23°29′1″E
- Opening date: 1957
- Operator: Department of Water Affairs

Dam and spillways
- Impounds: Groot River
- Height: 31 m
- Length: 348 m

Reservoir
- Creates: Beervlei Dam Reservoir
- Total capacity: 85 800 000 m^{3}
- Surface area: 231 ha

Beervlei Dam is a dam across the Groot River, Eastern Cape, South Africa. Established in 1957, it has the capacity of 85,800,000 cubic metres (3.03×10^{9} cu ft), and a surface area of 23.145 square kilometres (8.936 sq mi), and the dam wall is 31 m high. The main purpose of the dam is to provide flood absorption. The Karoo sediments in the area contain a lot of salts and it has been found that lengthy storage of water results in high water salinity. Any flood water is used as quickly as possible by the downstream irrigators and the reservoir is kept empty for extended periods.

== See also ==
- List of reservoirs and dams in South Africa
- List of rivers in South Africa
