= Keurbooms River =

River in the Western Cape, South Africa

Keurbooms River Keurboomsrivier
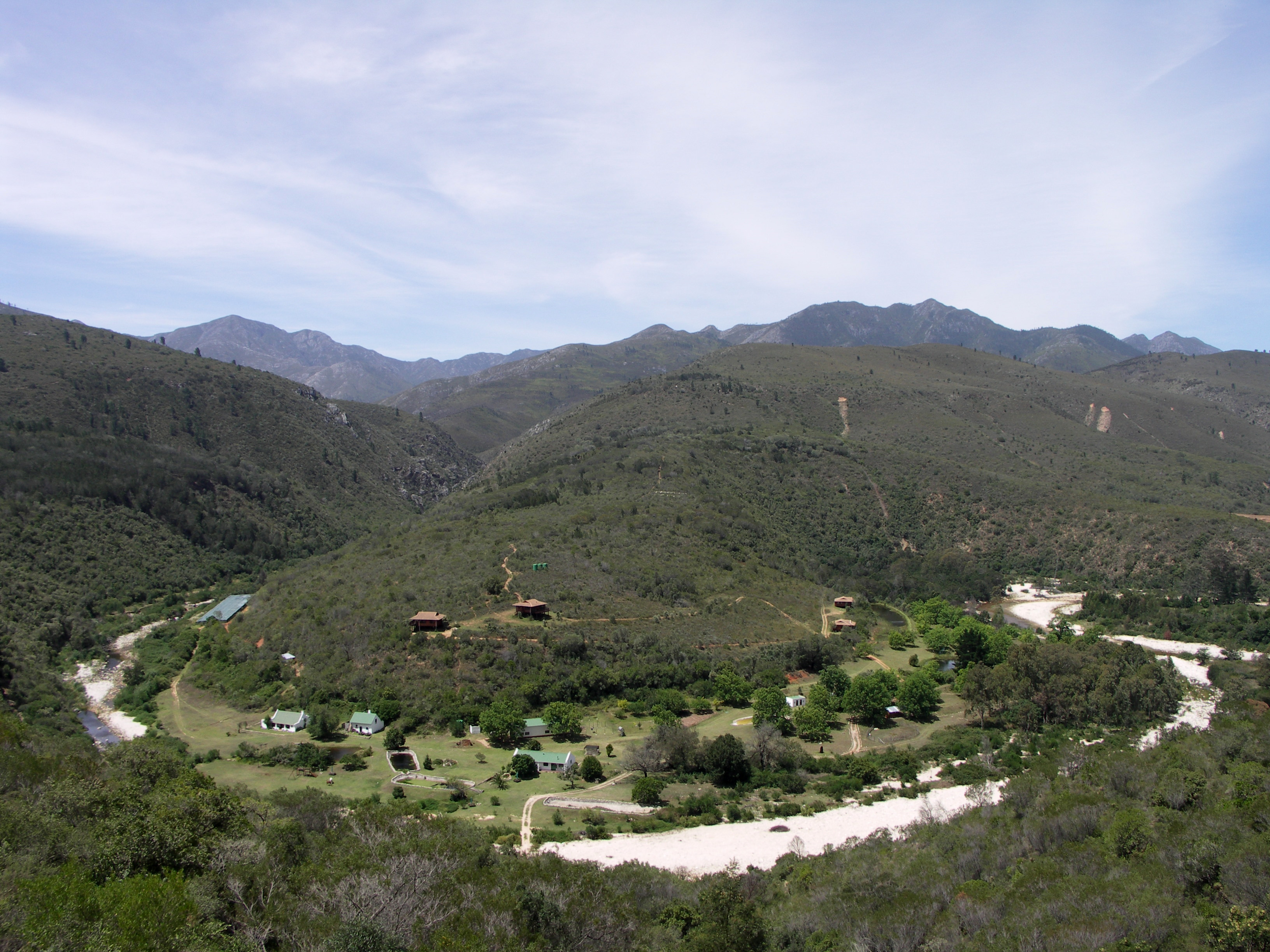
- Lodge and trout farm on the Keurbooms River, as seen from the R339 road

- Location of the Keurbooms River mouth
- Etymology: After the keurboom trees (genus Virgilia in Afrikaans)

Location
- Country: South Africa
- Province: Western Cape Province

Physical characteristics
- Source: Spitskop
  - location: Outeniqua Mountains
  - elevation: 1,000 m (3,300 ft)
- Mouth: Indian Ocean
  - location: Near Plettenberg Bay
  - coordinates: 34°01′37″S 23°23′42″E
  - elevation: 0 m (0 ft)
- Length: 85 km (53 mi)
- Basin size: 1,080 km^{2} (420 sq mi)

The Keurbooms River (Afrikaans: Keurboomsrivier) is a river in the Western Cape Province in South Africa. The river has its sources south of Uniondale in the Langkloof and flows in a roughly southeastern direction. It passes De Vlugt and the Prince Alfred Pass, flowing along the northern side of the R340 road then it turns south. After crossing the N2 road, it flows into the Indian Ocean through the Keurbooms Estuary, located close to the coastal town of Plettenberg Bay.

The Keurbooms River is approximately 85 km long with a catchment area of 1,080 km2. Its main tributary is the Bitou (Bietou).

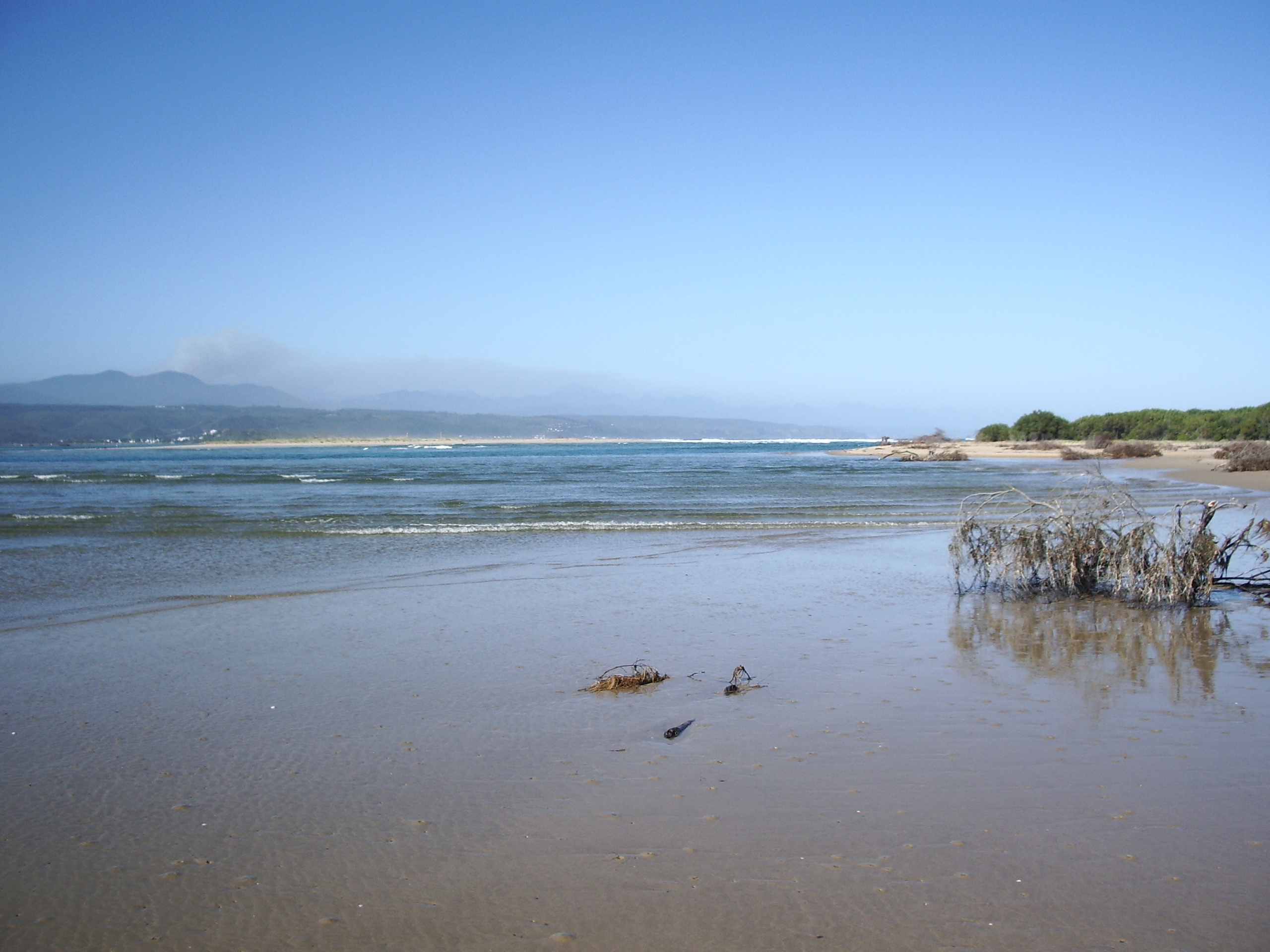
View from the Keurbooms River estuary near Plettenberg Bay

== Ecology ==
The Keurbooms River marks the eastern limit of the area inhabited by the Cape galaxias (Galaxias zebratus), a South African fish species endemic to the Cape Floristic Region. It shares the same habitat as imported trouts and lives in an area between the Keurbooms and the Olifants River. Although in South Africa this relatively delicate fish is only classified as near threatened, in Australia species of the same genus were driven to extinction by competing salmonids.

== See also ==
- Keurboomstrand
- List of rivers of South Africa
- List of estuaries of South Africa
- Drainage basins of South Africa
