= B.J. Vorster Hospital =

- Eastern Cape Department of Health

Geography
- Location: Kareedouw, Sarah Baartman District Municipality, Eastern Cape, South Africa
- Coordinates: 33°57′15″S 24°17′43″E

Organisation
- Care system: Public
- Type: Community

Services
- Emergency department: Yes

Links
- Website: B.J. Vorster Hospital
- Other links: List of hospitals in South Africa

B.J. Vorster Hospital is a Provincial government funded hospital for the Kou-Kamma Local Municipality area in Kareedouw, Eastern Cape in South Africa.

The hospital departments include Emergency department, Paediatric ward, Maternity ward, Out Patients Department, Surgical Services, Medical Services, Operating Theatre & CSSD Services, Pharmacy, Anti-Retroviral (ARV) treatment for HIV/AIDS, Post Trauma Counseling Services, Physiotherapy, X-ray Services, Occupational Services, Laboratory Services, Laundry Services, Kitchen Services and Mortuary.
