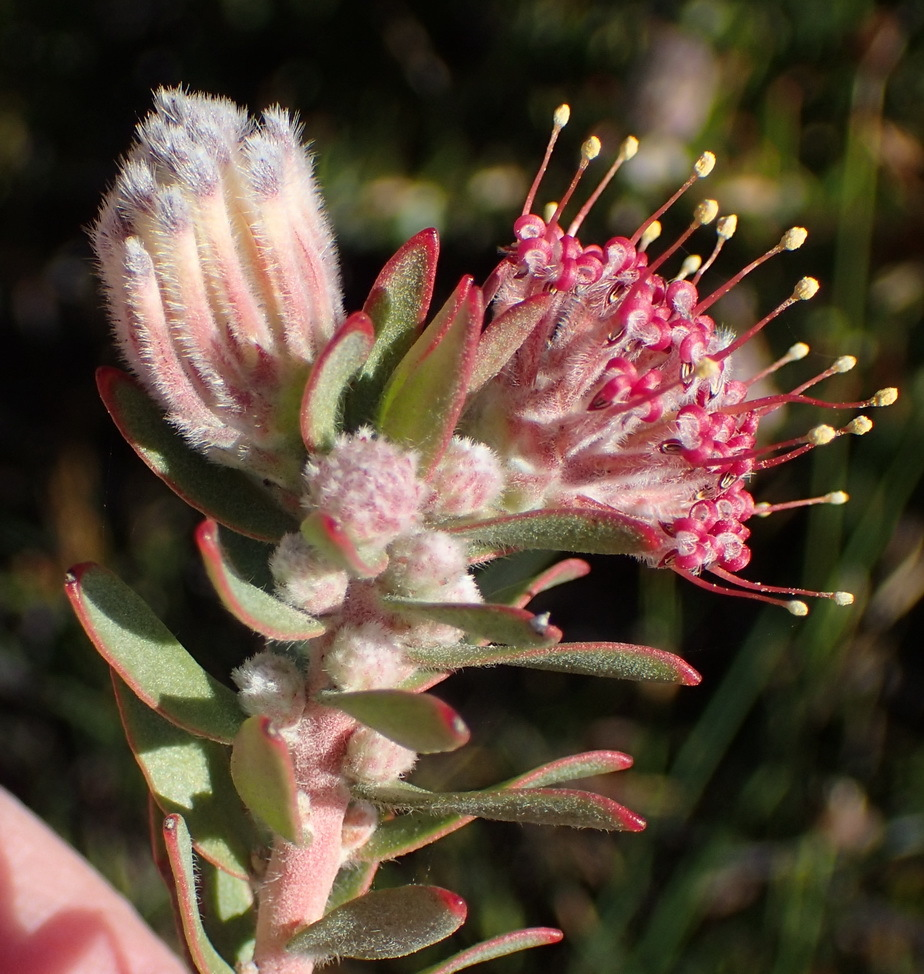

Conservation status
- Least Concern (IUCN 3.1)

Scientific classification
- Kingdom: Plantae
- Clade: Tracheophytes
- Clade: Angiosperms
- Clade: Eudicots
- Order: Proteales
- Family: Proteaceae
- Genus: Leucospermum
- Species: L. royenifolium

Binomial name
- Leucospermum royenifolium (Salisb. ex Knight) Stapf

Synonyms
- Leucadendrum royenaefolium; Leucospermum puberum var. dubium

= Leucospermum royenifolium =

Species of plant

Leucospermum royenifolium is an evergreen, spreading or somewhat upturning shrub of up to 0.5 m (1.7 ft) high and 1–3 m (3–10 ft) in diameter from the family Proteaceae. It has patent elliptic, eventually hairless leaves. The flower heads are globe-shaped, 1–2 cm (0.4–0.8 in) in diameter, and contain initially whitish, later pinkish, sweetly scented flowers. From the center of the flowers emerge almost straight styles that jointly give the impression of a pincushion. It is called eastern pincushion in English. It can be found flowering between July and December. It occurs in the Western Cape and Eastern Cape provinces of South Africa.

== Description ==
Leucospermum royenifolium is a spreading, somewhat upright to creeping shrub of about 0.5 m (1.7 ft) high, that may form a dense mat of 1–3 m (3–10 ft) in diameter. Its main, horizontal branches are woody near the base and covered in a layer of bark of 3–5 mm (0.12–0.20 in) thick. The flowering stems also are somewhat upright to creeping, 2–3 mm (0.08-0.12 in) in cross section, initially powdery hairy but later hairless. The leaves are spreading at about 45° relative to the branches, elliptic in shape, 1.5–2.3 cm (0.6–0.9 in) long and 4–6 mm (0.16–0.24 in) wide, narrowing to a point at its base, and with a pointy tip, an entire margin or very rarely with two or three teeth, with a surface that may initially be powdery hairy, but this indumentum is quickly lost.

The flower heads are globe-shaped, 1−2 cm (0.4−0.8 in) in diameter, seated or on a short stalk of up to 1 cm (0.4 in) long. These are sometimes set individually, mostly grouped with three to five, but on new vigorous shoots with twenty to forty can occupy the highest leaf axils. The common base of the flowers in the same head is broadly cone-shaped, about 5 mm (0.20 in) long and 4 mm (0.16 in) wide. The bracts that subtend the head are oval in shape with a pointy tip, about 5 mm long and 3 mm (0.12 in) wide, cartilaginous in consistency, covered in a dense mat of soft woolly hairs (tomentose). The tips of the highest whorl of bracts are somewhat pointed and curved down.

The 4-merous perianth is 1–1.5 cm (0.4-0.6 in) long, pale cream to ivory at first but later turning deep pink, straight when still in the bud, somewhat compressed sideways, covered in a mat of short woolly hairs. The lower part with the lobes fused (called tube) is about 4 mm (0.16 in) long, powdery higher up, but hairless and narrower at base. The middle part where all four lobes become free when the flower opens (called claws), are about 1 cm (0.4 in) long, initially cream and greenish, later becoming pale carmine, individually curl back to its base when the flowers open. The higher part of the lobes (called limbs) is lance-shaped with a pointy tip, about 1.5 mm (0.06 in) long, and set on the outside with upright, stiff hairs. The style is 13–16 mm (0.52–0.64 in) long, tapering towards its tip, initially pale greenish cream but turning to pinkish carmine. The slightly thickened tip called pollen presenter is cylinder-shaped with a blunt tip, with the groove that functions as the stigma and about 1 mm (0.04 in) long. Subtending the ovary are four opaque, thread-shaped scales of about 2 mm (0.08 in) long. The fruit is ellipsoid, whitish in colour, about 7 mm (0.28 in) long, somewhat pointy and lacking a beak.

The flowers of Leucospermum royenifolium are sweetly scented.

=== Differences with related species ===
L. royenifolium differs from its closest relatives by its spreading habit and the later hairless and patent leaves. One hybrid swarm is known between this species and L. wittebergense where any combination of the differing characters can be found.

== Taxonomy ==
As far as we know, the eastern pincushion was first collected between 1799 and 1803 from the north face of the Outeniqua Mountains by Scottish plant collector James Niven. Richard Anthony Salisbury described the species based on Niven's material in a book published by Joseph Knight in 1809 titled On the cultivation of the plants belonging to the natural order of Proteeae, and called it Leucadendrum royenaefolium. In 1856, Carl Meisner described Leucospermum puberum var. dubium. Salisbury's names were ignored by botanists in favour of those that Brown had created, and this was formalised in 1900 when Leucospermum was given priority over Leucadendrum. Compton reassigned the eastern pincushion to the genus Leucospermum, and created the new combination Leucospermum royenaefolium in 1912. In 1970, John Patrick Rourke considered all of these names synonymous. During the 1970s, the International Botanical Congress decided to replace all instances of compounding by the genitive "ae" by "i", thus changing the spelling of the name of this species to Leucospermum royenifolium.

L. royenifolium has been assigned to the louse pincushions, section Diastelloidea.

The species name royenifolium means "with leaves of Royena", a plant called wild coffee in South Africa.

== Distribution, habitat and ecology ==
L. royenifolium occurs along the length of the Langkloof on the northern edge of the Outeniqua Mountains, eastwards to Misgund. It is also known from the Swartberg between Meiringspoort in the west to Kouga Local Municipality and the Baviaanskloof Mountains all the way to Scholtzberg. It grows exclusively on north facing slopes consisting of Witteberg Quartzite or Table Mountain Sandstone, at an altitude of 600–1250 m (2000–4000 ft), in a vegetation type called arid fynbos or sometimes in renosterveld. Compared to most other Leucospermum species, the eastern pincushion grows under climatically demanding circumstances, receiving an average annual precipitation of 250–375 mm (10–15 in), almost evenly distributed over the year except for a small peak during winter, with occasional frosts during winter and very hot in summer.

The tough corky bark that covers the basal branches provides the plant with some protection against the wildfire that naturally occurs in the fynbos. It regenerates by growing new shoots from these main branches.

The small flowers of this species are pollinated by bees, flies and butterflies. About two months after flowering, the ripe fruits fall to the ground, where these are collected by native ants that carry them to their underground nests. Here the elaiosome is eaten by the ants but the smooth and hard seeds remain protected against rodents, birds and fire, until the seeds germinate when one of the periodic wildfires that occur in the fynbos has cleared the above-ground vegetation.

== Conservation ==
The eastern pincushion is considered to be a species of least concern because of its stable population with a rather large distribution.
