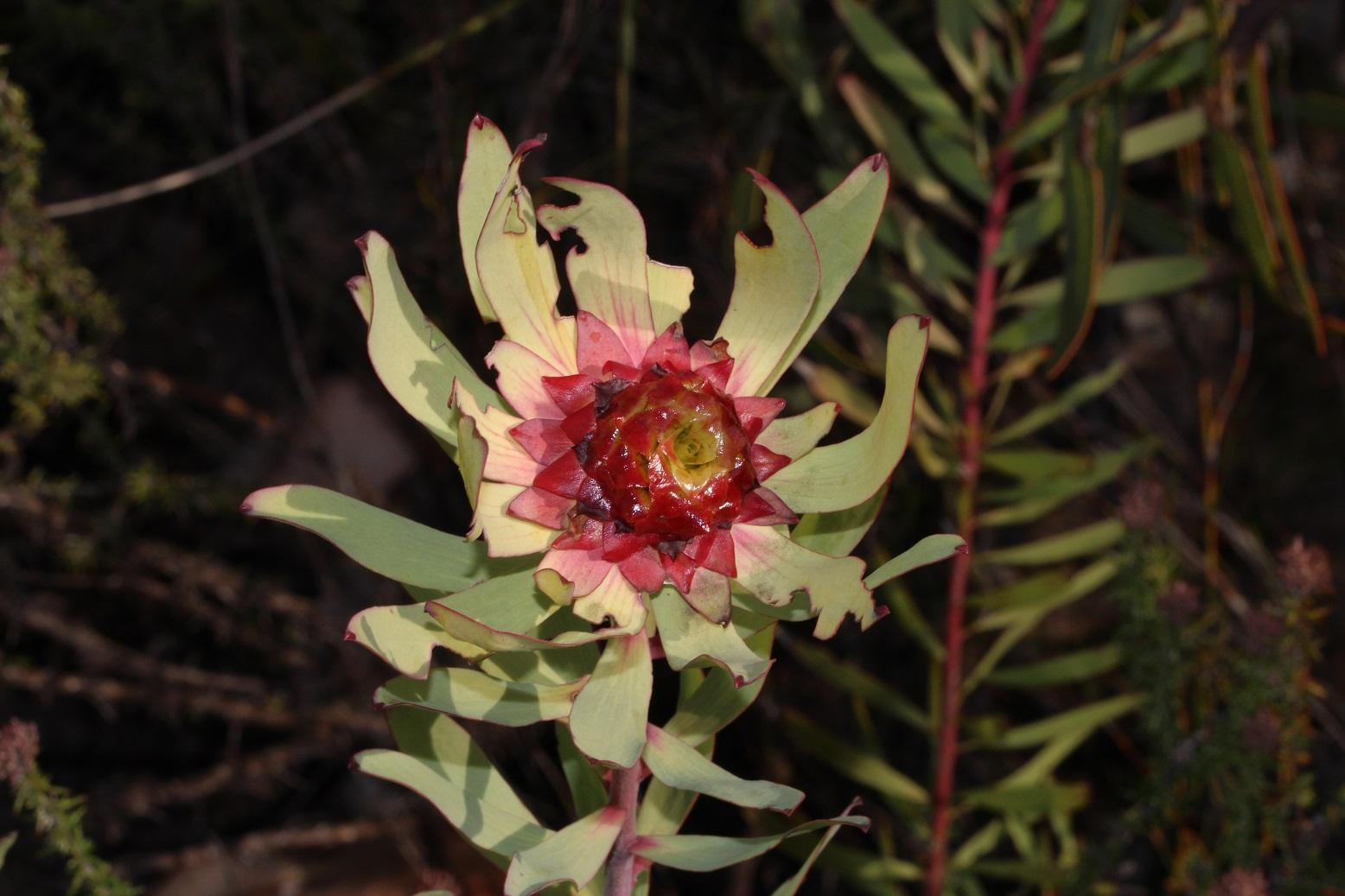

Conservation status
- Near Threatened (IUCN 3.1)

Scientific classification
- Kingdom: Plantae
- Clade: Tracheophytes
- Clade: Angiosperms
- Clade: Eudicots
- Order: Proteales
- Family: Proteaceae
- Genus: Leucadendron
- Species: L. pubibracteolatum

Binomial name
- Leucadendron pubibracteolatum I.Williams

= Leucadendron pubibracteolatum =

Species of plant

Leucadendron pubibracteolatum, the purple-leaf conebush, is a flower-bearing shrub belonging to the genus Leucadendron and forms part of the fynbos. The plant is native to the Western Cape and Eastern Cape.

In Afrikaans, it is known as persblaartolbos.

== Description ==
The shrub grows 1.3 m (4.3 ft) tall and flowers from July to August. The plant dies after a fire but the seeds survive. The seeds are stored in a toll on the female plant and fall out of the toll onto the soil after two months where they are spread by rodents. The plant is unisexual and there are separate plants with male and female flowers, which are pollinated by small beetles.

== Distribution and habitat ==
Leucadendron pubibracteolatum occurs in the Outeniqua Mountains, Kouga Mountains, and Baviaankloof Mountains from George to Joubertina, Scholtzberg, Swartberg, and the Kammanassie Mountains. The plant grows mainly in rocky, sandy soil at 300–1,000 m (980–3,280 ft).
