= Louterwater =

- Location within Eastern Cape Location within South Africa
- Coordinates: 33.8°S 23.67°E
- Country: South Africa
- Province: Eastern Cape
- District: Sarah Baartman
- Municipality: Kou-Kamma

Area
  - Total: 1.99 km^{2} (0.77 sq mi)

Population (2011)
  - Total: 4,829
  - Density: 2,430/km^{2} (6,280/sq mi)

Racial makeup (2011)
  - Black African: 27.4%
  - Coloured: 70.3%
  - Indian/Asian: 0.1%
  - White: 1.0%
  - Other: 1.1%

First languages (2011)
  - Afrikaans: 74.2%
  - Xhosa: 21.2%
  - English: 1.7%
  - Other: 2.8%
- Time zone: UTC+2 (SAST)
- PO box: 6435

Louterwater is a town in Sarah Baartman District Municipality in the Eastern Cape province of South Africa, located between Joubertina and Misgund on the R62 road.

The town hosts a large apple and pear farm of the same name, which had been bought in 1961 by P. K. Le Roux, then Minister of Agriculture and Water Affairs; the farm is still owned by his descendants.
