= Langkloof =

Valley in South Africa

Coordinates: 33°49′30″S 23°51′28″E

- Length: 160 km (99 mi)

Geography
- Country: South Africa
- province: Eastern Cape
- Interactive map of Langkloof

The Langkloof is a 160 km-long (99 mi) valley in South Africa, lying between Herold, a small village northeast of George, and The Heights – just beyond Twee Riviere.

== History ==
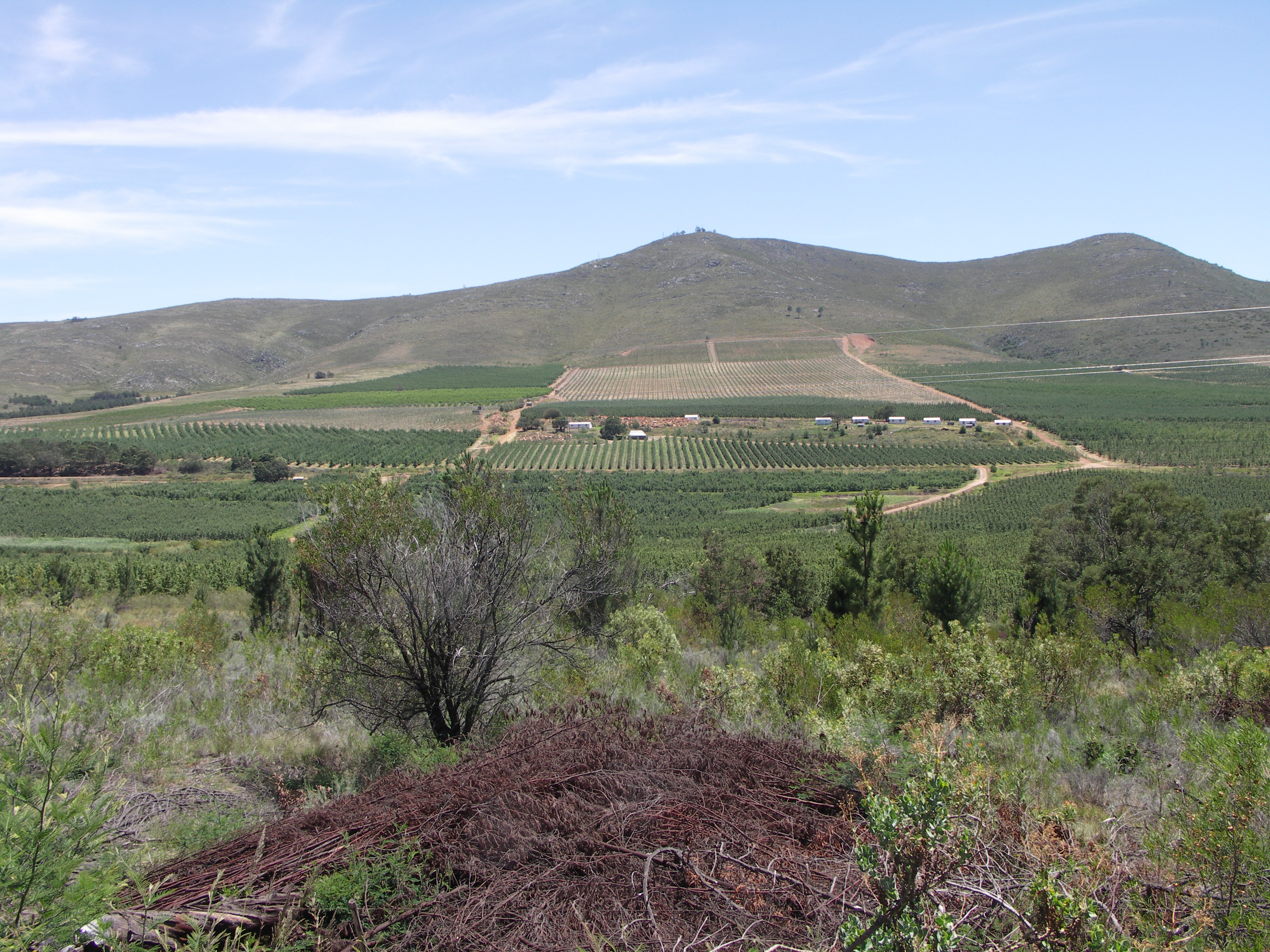
Orchards in the Langkloof between Joubertina and Avontuur

The kloof was given its name by Isaq Schrijver in 1689, and more thoroughly explored by a later expedition under ensign August Frederik Beutler in 1752.

The valley has been farmed since 1760 and developed into an important fruit-growing region during the 1900s, specifically prized for its apples and pears.

Joubertina is the largest but also the youngest town in the Langkloof, and was founded in 1907 as a Dutch-Reformed community, named in honour of the Rev. W.A. Joubert of Uniondale. The reverend prohibited the sale of alcohol in the town, a ban which was never lifted but is nonetheless no longer enforced.

The Langkloof is also home to early Bushman paintings and the Kouga mummy – the only mummy ever found in Southern Africa from a cave in the Baviaanskloof Wilderness Area. The remarkably well-preserved mummy is relatively young - estimated to be buried approximately 1930 years ago. These buried human remains were found wrapped in Boophone disticha bulb tunics, appeared to be of the Khoi people, and was subsequently transferred to the Albany Museum in Grahamstown.

== Geography ==
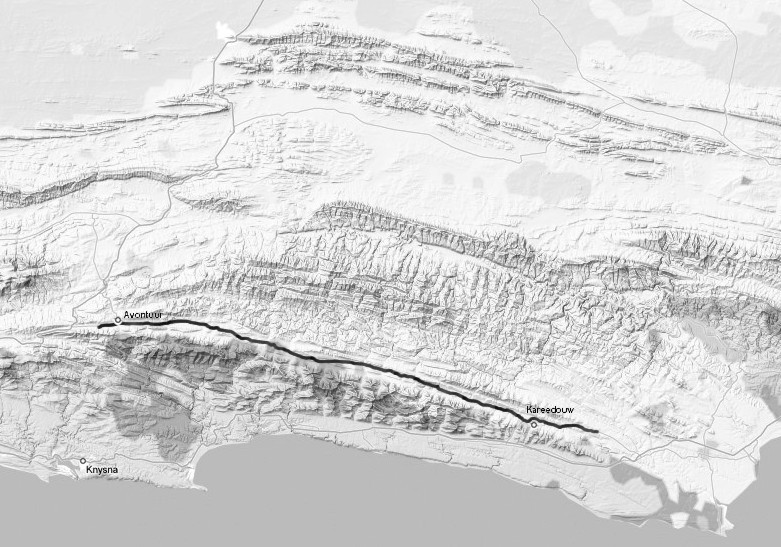
Langkloof

On its north side the Langkloof is bounded by the Kammanassie and Kouga Mountains, and on its south by the Langkloof, Tsitsikamma and Kareedouw Mountains. A low range of hills running parallel to the Langkloof and lying inside it, divides the kloof into northern and southern sections. The southern section is called the Klein Langkloof and is a prominent apple-growing area. The valley is crossed by numerous streams that arise in the Tsitsikamma Mountains before flowing inland to join the Kammanassie and Kouga Rivers. The road down the Kloof passes through the hamlets and towns of Herold, Avontuur, Haarlem, Misgund, Louterwater, Krakeel, Joubertina and Twee Riviere.

== Transport ==
The R62 road runs the length of the valley, connecting the N2 road near Humansdorp with the N9 road near Uniondale. The Avontuur narrow-gauge railway follows the same route Port Elizabeth to Avontuur.

== See also ==
- Andrew Geddes Bain
- Baviaanskloof River
- South African Class 91-000
