= Clarkson, South Africa =

Clarkson
- Location within Eastern Cape Location within South Africa
- Coordinates: 34.010°S 24.341°E
- Country: South Africa
- Province: Eastern Cape
- District: Sarah Baartman
- Municipality: Kou-Kamma

Area
  - Total: 2.27 km^{2} (0.88 sq mi)

Population (2011)
  - Total: 1,824
  - Density: 804/km^{2} (2,080/sq mi)

Racial makeup (2011)
  - Black African: 40.3%
  - Coloured: 58.4%
  - Indian/Asian: 0.1%
  - White: 0.2%
  - Other: 1.0%

First languages (2011)
  - Afrikaans: 63.3%
  - Xhosa: 33.3%
  - Sotho: 1.4%
  - English: 1.2%
  - Other: 0.9%
- Time zone: UTC+2 (SAST)
- PO box: 6302
- Area code: 042

Clarkson is a town in Kou-Kamma Local Municipality in the Eastern Cape province of South Africa.

Moravian Mission village in the former Humansdorp district, 26 km south-east of Assegaaibos station and 60 km west of Humansdorp. A mission station was established by Bishop Hans Peter Hallbeck in 1839 and named after Thomas Clarkson who helped abolish the slave-trade.
