= Krakeel River =

Krakeel River Krakeelrivier
- Location within Eastern Cape Location within South Africa
- Coordinates: 33.814°S 23.732°E
- Country: South Africa
- Province: Eastern Cape
- District: Sarah Baartman
- Municipality: Kou-Kamma

Area
  - Total: 1.06 km^{2} (0.41 sq mi)

Population (2011)
  - Total: 1,931
  - Density: 1,820/km^{2} (4,720/sq mi)

Racial makeup (2011)
  - Black African: 13.2%
  - Coloured: 78.1%
  - Indian/Asian: 1.1%
  - White: 6.7%
  - Other: 0.8%

First languages (2011)
  - Afrikaans: 89.5%
  - Xhosa: 6.3%
  - English: 2.3%
  - Other: 1.8%
- Time zone: UTC+2 (SAST)
- PO box: 6430

Krakeel River is a town in Sarah Baartman District Municipality in the Eastern Cape province of South Africa.

Village in the Langkloof, east of Avontuur and some 200 km from Port Elizabeth. The name is taken from that of the river. The form Krakeelrivier is preferred for official purposes.
