= Skrijwershoek =

Skrijwershoek Arboretum is a private arboretum in Twee Riviere, South Africa. Though a private collection, on the campus of The South African Institute for Heritage Science and Conservation, the arboretum is nonetheless accessible to the interested public.

Skrijwershoek predominantly features rare, autumn colouring species and selected cultivars of special interest to landscaping purposes. The oak genus in particular is well represented. Planting of Skrijwershoek started as recently as 1997. During early May, the collection may be viewed at the height of it autumn colouration.
