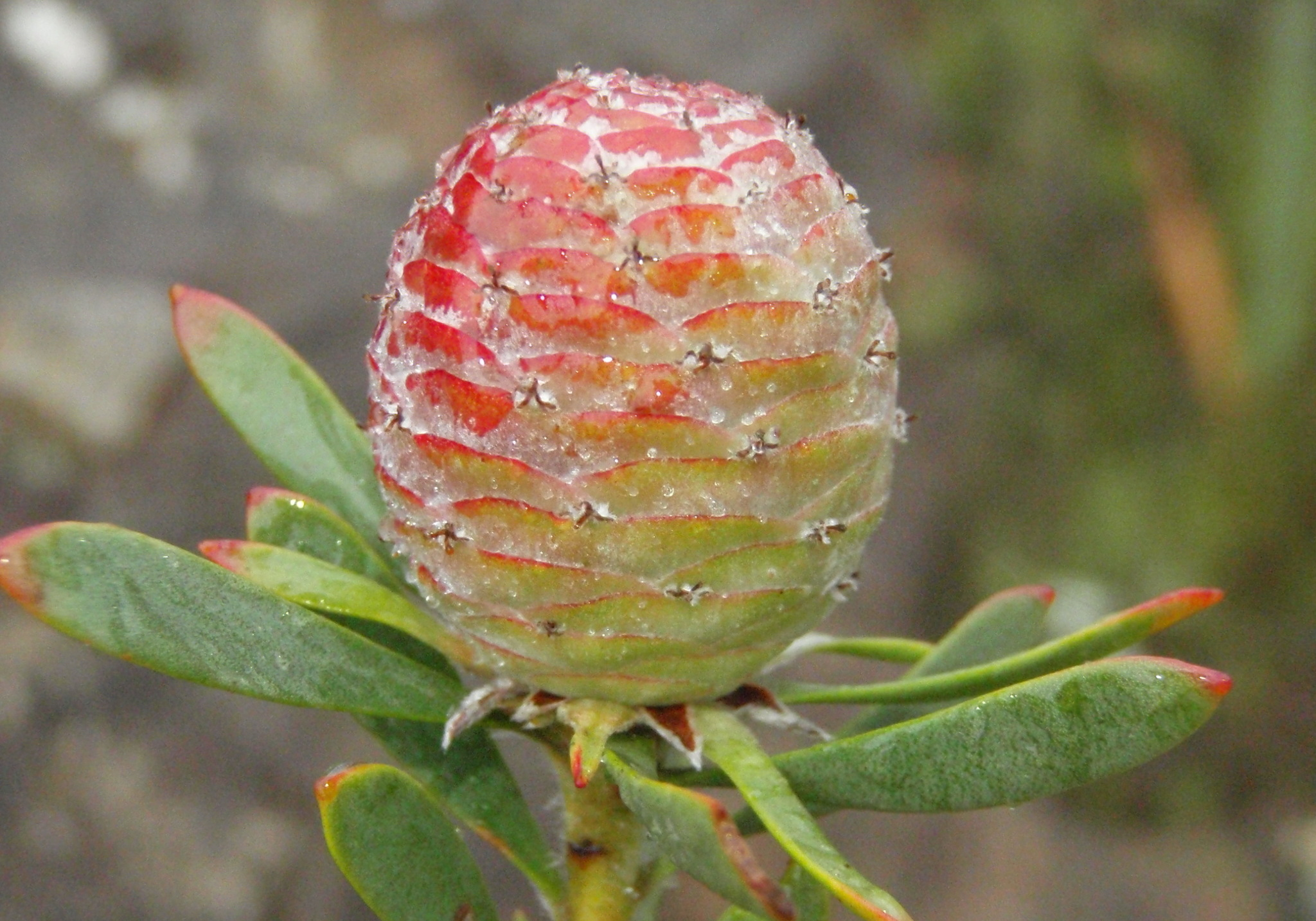

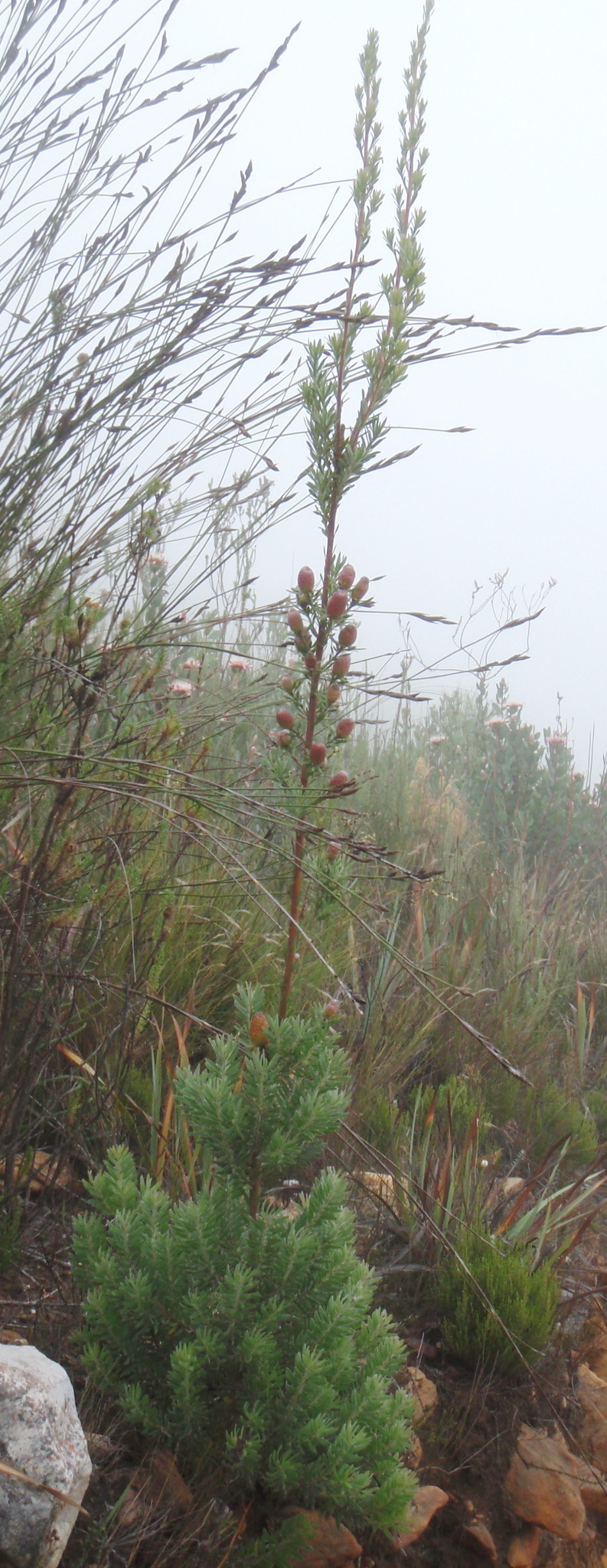

Conservation status
- Least Concern (IUCN 3.1)

Scientific classification
- Kingdom: Plantae
- Clade: Tracheophytes
- Clade: Angiosperms
- Clade: Eudicots
- Order: Proteales
- Family: Proteaceae
- Genus: Leucadendron
- Species: L. rourkei

Binomial name
- Leucadendron rourkei I.Williams

= Leucadendron rourkei =

Species of plant

Leucadendron rourkei, the Uniondale conebush, is a flower-bearing shrub belonging to the genus Leucadendron and forms part of the fynbos. The plant is native to the Western Cape and Eastern Cape, South Africa. The plant is rare.

== Description ==
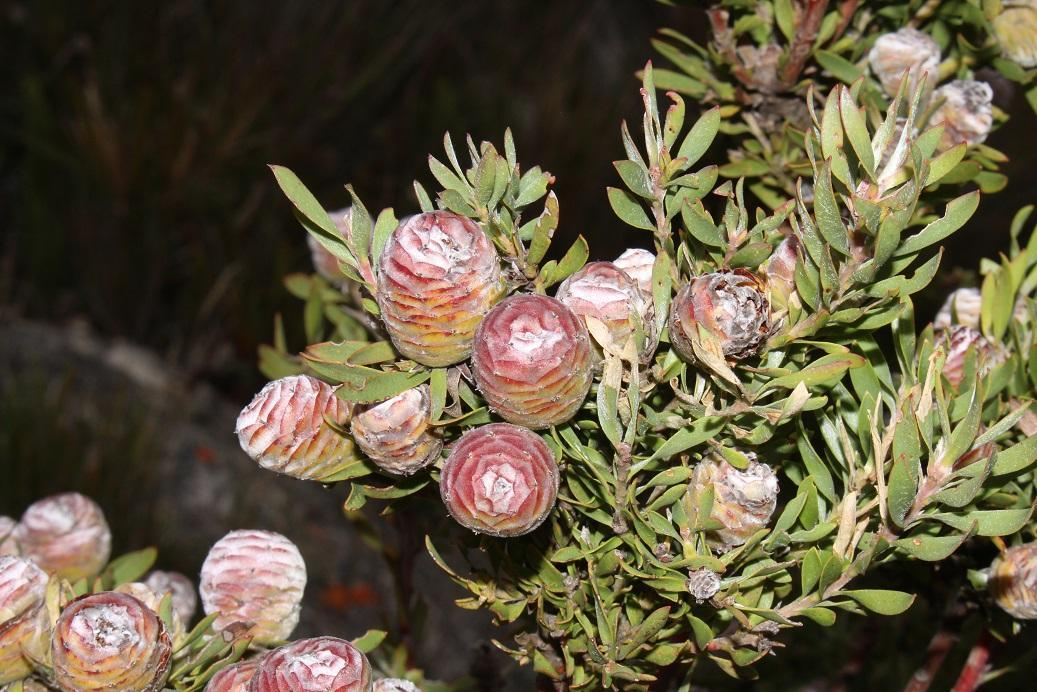

The shrub grows 5 m (16 ft) tall and flowers from December to January. The plant dies after a fire but the seeds survive. The seeds are stored in a toll on the female plant and fall to the ground after a fire, possibly spreading by the wind. The plant is unisexual and there are separate plants with male and female flowers, which are pollinated by the wind.

The tree's national number is 81.6.

In Afrikaans, it known as Uniondale-tolbos.

== Distribution and habitat ==
The plant occurs in the Kammanassie Mountains, Kouga Mountains, and eastern Swartberg. The plant grows on southern slopes in shale or rocky soil at altitudes of 1,370 to 1,700 m (4,490 to 5,580 ft).

== Gallery ==
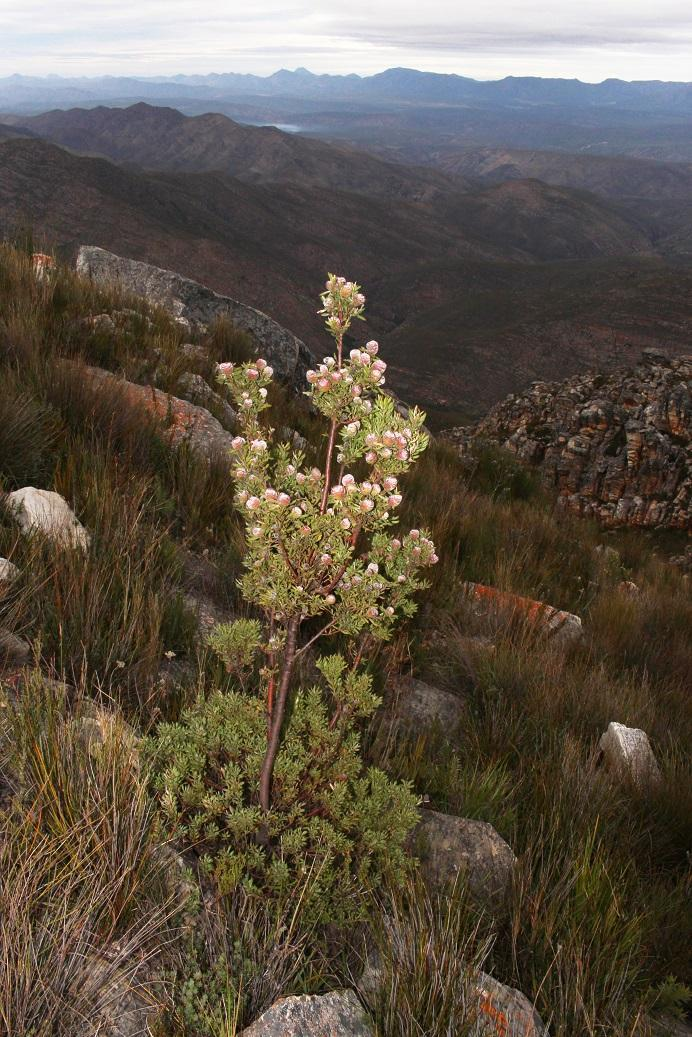

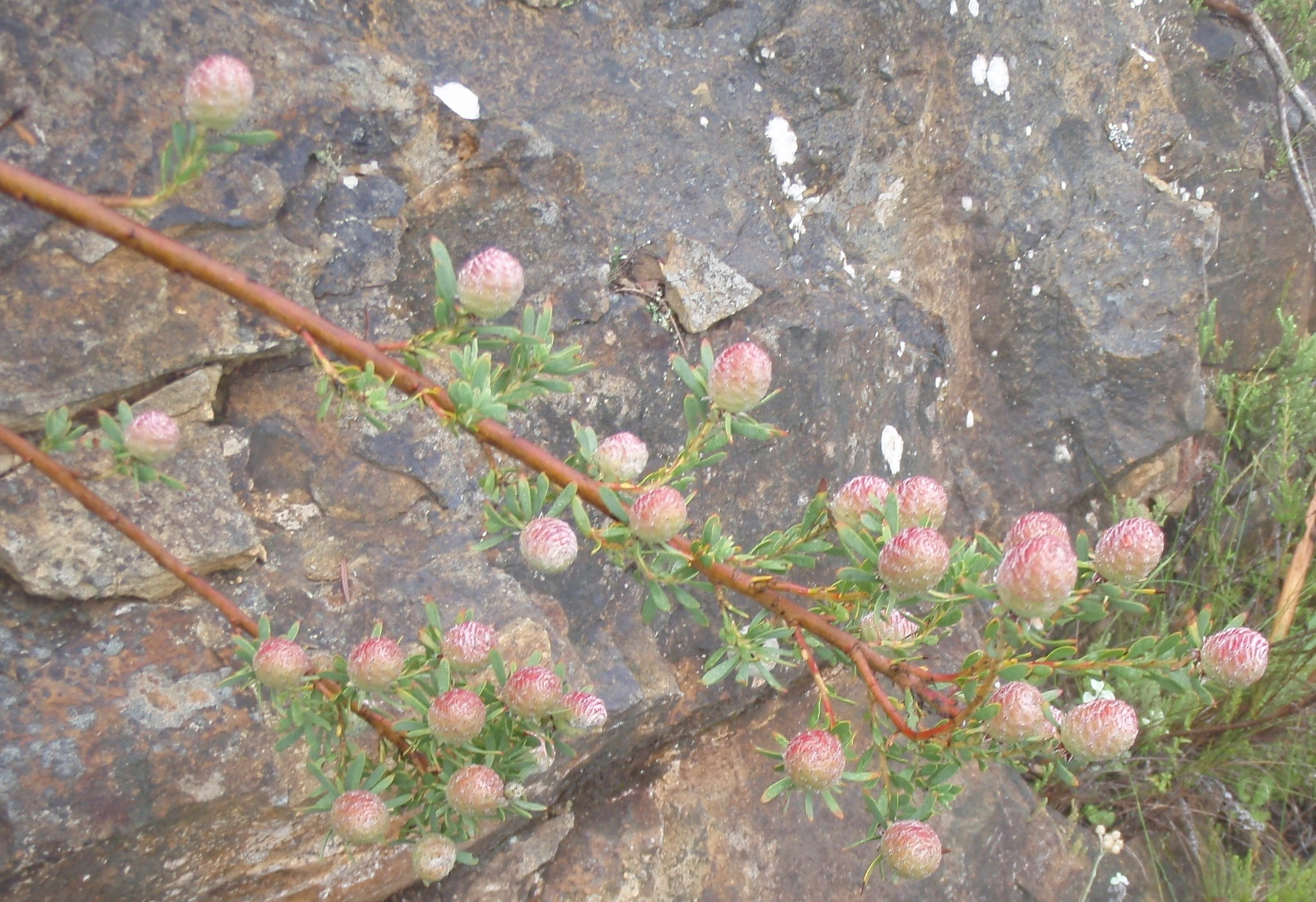

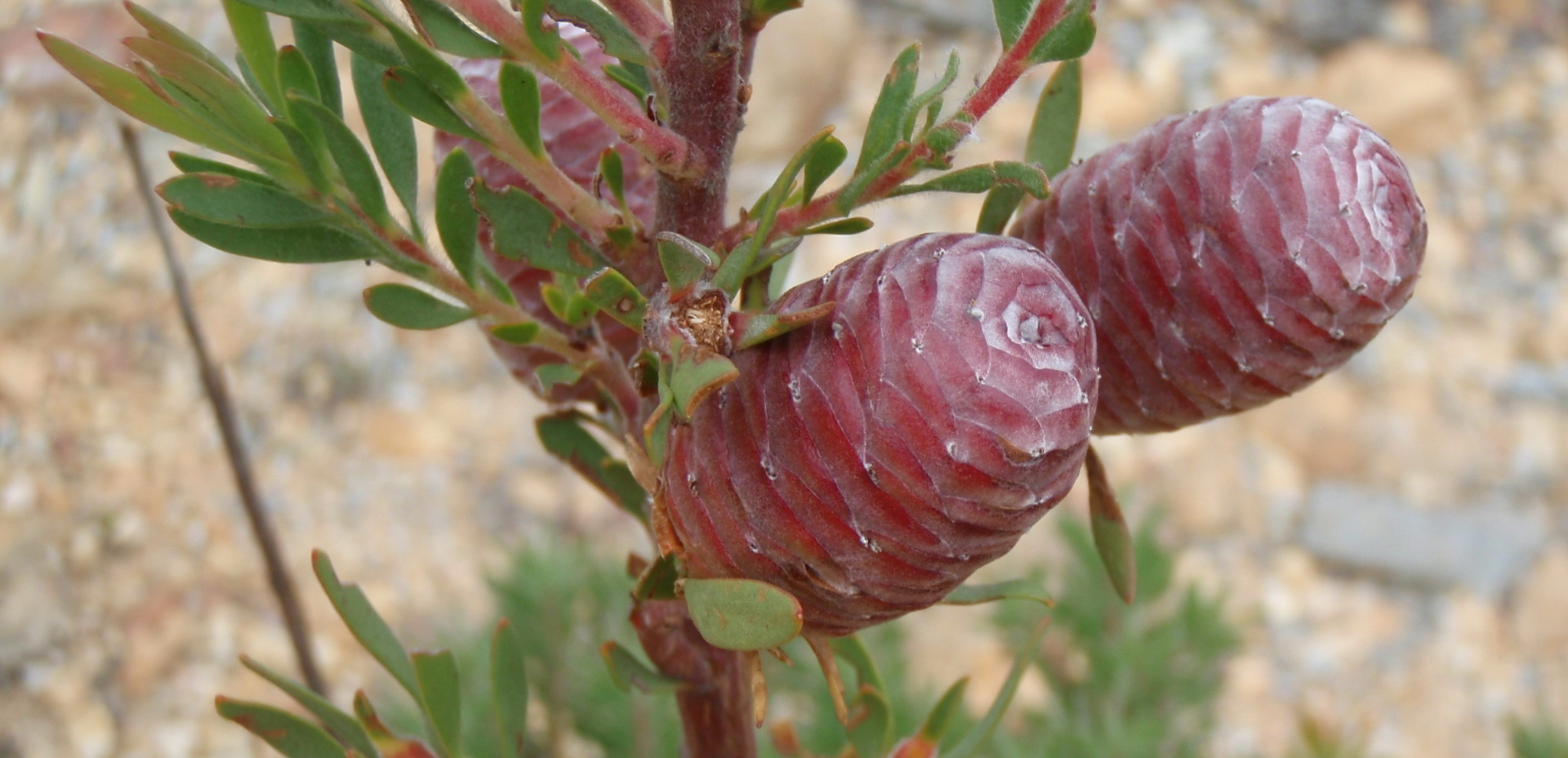

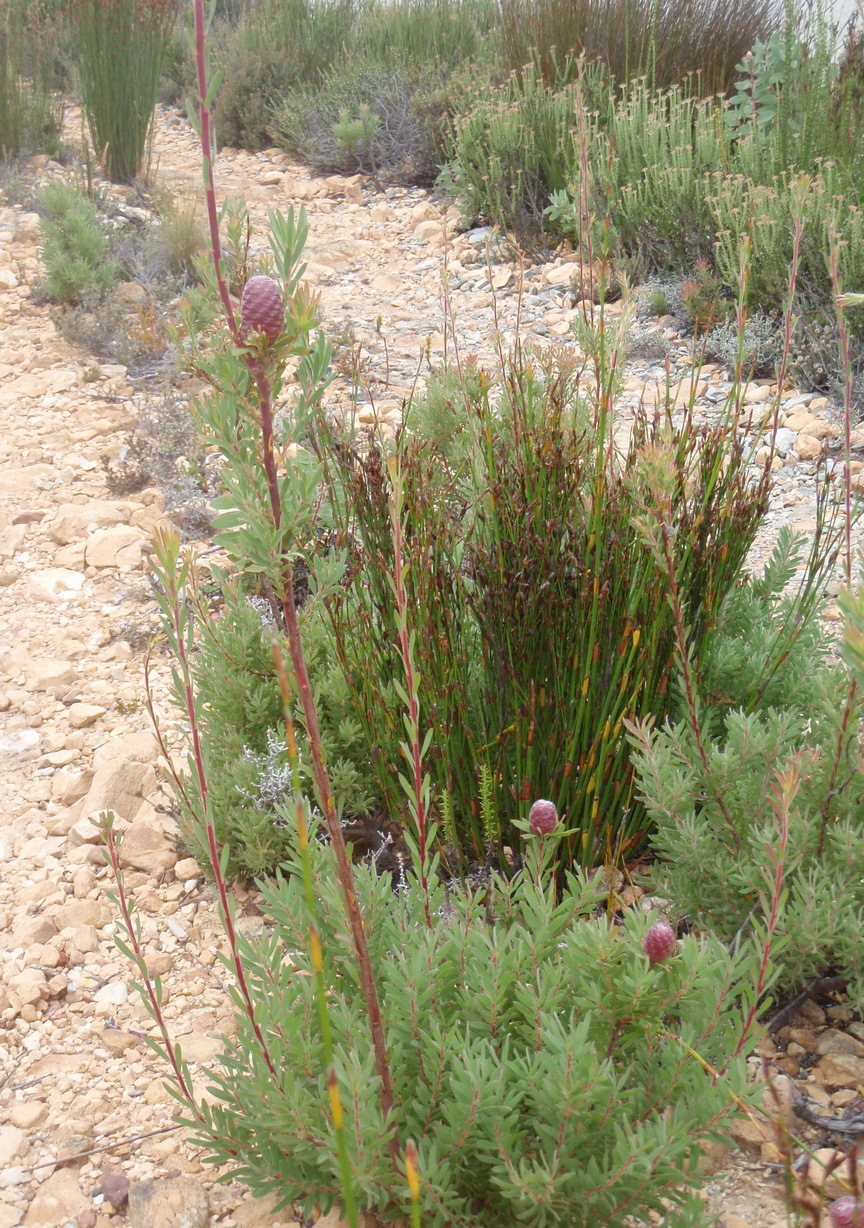

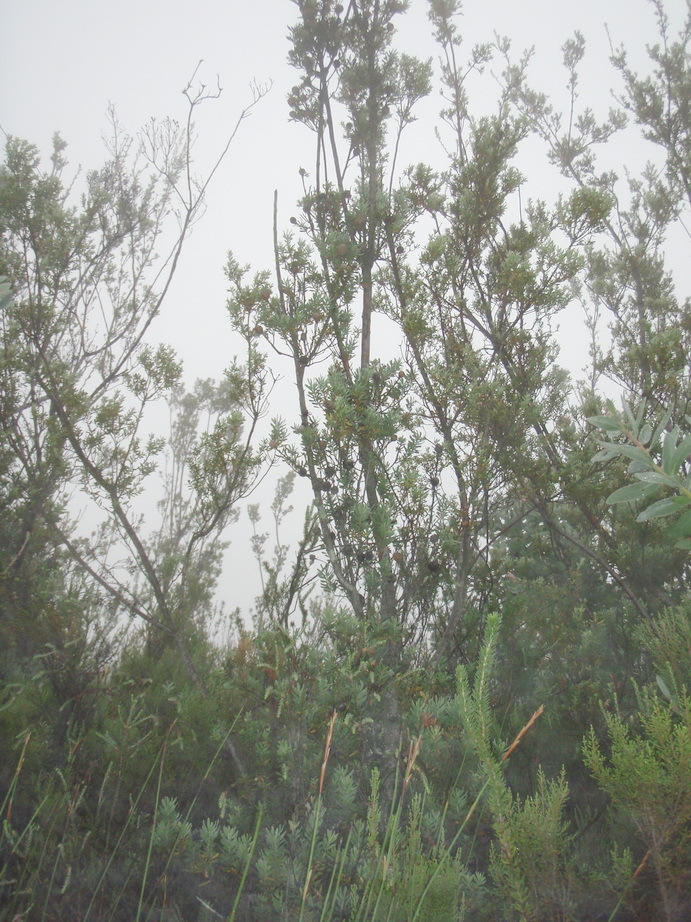

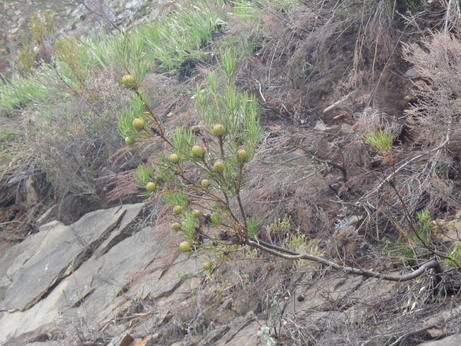

== Sources ==
- http://redlist.sanbi.org/species.php?species=794-114
- http://biodiversityexplorer.info/plants/proteaceae/leucadendron_rourkei.htm
- https://www.proteaatlas.org.za/conebu.htm
