= Twee Riviere =

- Location within Eastern Cape Location within South Africa
- Coordinates: 33.84045°S 23.8939°E
- Country: South Africa
- Province: Eastern Cape
- District: Sarah Baartman
- Municipality: Kou-Kamma

Area
  - Total: 2.72 km^{2} (1.05 sq mi)

Population (2011)
  - Total: 485
  - Density: 178/km^{2} (462/sq mi)

First languages (2011)
  - Afrikaans: 77.9%
  - English: 8.5%
  - Xhosa: 6.8%
  - Tswana: 2.1%
  - Other: 4.8%
- Time zone: UTC+2 (SAST)
- PO box: 6411

Twee Riviere (accepted spelling) is a town in Sarah Baartman District Municipality in the Eastern Cape province of South Africa.

The town is located in the Langkloof (Afrikaans for "long valley"). Twee Riviere (Afrikaans for "two rivers") takes its name from the Diep River (historically known as Klipdrif) and the Dwars River which arise in the Tsitsikamma Mountains to the south, flowing through the town. Like so many other rivers in the Langkloof, these modest streams head inland for a considerable distance, before joining larger watercourses and gradually turning coastward.

The village of Twee Riviere is one of the earliest communities in the Langkloof, the original farm having been surveyed and registered under that name already on 14 February 1765. Originally a loan farm issued by the V.O.C. to Jacobus Scheepers, Twee Riviere was subsequently and briefly owned by Jacobus du Preez during the early 1780s, followed by Kritzinger and thereafter sold to Ockert Olivier in 1793. As the subdivision of land increased within the close, valley geography, the trend soon gave rise to a notable concentration of dwellings and households, which in time assumed the beginnings of richly varied Twee Riviere village, as it exists today.

Today, 125 families (representing approximately 60 surnames) comprise this and village.

In addition Twee Riviere is also home to other notable features of interest, such as the campus grounds of the South African Institute for Heritage Science and Conservation, a formal institution of higher learning (postgraduate diploma level). Of further interest to horticulturists, landscapers and tree collectors, is the campus's Skrijwershoek Arboretum. The arboretum houses a tree collection of uncommon landscape oaks and other tree specimens, and is renowned for exceptional autumn colouration.
