= Kou-Kamma Local Municipality elections =

Local elections in the Eastern Cape, South Africa

The Kou-Kamma Local Municipality council consists of twelve members elected by mixed-member proportional representation. Six councillors are elected by first-past-the-post voting in six wards, while the remaining six are chosen from party lists so that the total number of party representatives is proportional to the number of votes received.

In the election of 4 November 2026 no party won a majority. The African National Congress (ANC) obtained a plurality of five seats.

== Results ==
The following table shows the composition of the council after past elections.

Event	ANC	DA	PA	Other	Total
2000 election	5	3	—	0	8
2006 election	7	2	—	1	10
2011 election	6	5	—	—	11
2016 election	6	5	—	0	11
2021 election	6	3	1	2	12
2026 election	5	3	4	0	12

== December 2000 election ==
Party	Ward			List			Total seats
Party	Votes	%	Seats	Votes	%	Seats	Total seats
African National Congress	4,649	64.58	4	4,628	64.49	1	5
Democratic Alliance	2,400	33.34	0	2,353	32.79	3	3
African Christian Democratic Party	150	2.08	0	195	2.72	0	0
Total	7,199	100.00	4	7,176	100.00	4	8
Valid votes	7,199	97.91		7,176	97.71		
Invalid/blank votes	154	2.09		168	2.29		
Total votes	7,353	100.00		7,344	100.00		
Registered voters/turnout	12,676	58.01		12,676	57.94		

== March 2006 election ==
Party	Ward			List			Total seats
Party	Votes	%	Seats	Votes	%	Seats	Total seats
African National Congress	5,577	66.53	5	5,616	67.10	2	7
Democratic Alliance	1,639	19.55	0	1,655	19.77	2	2
Independent Democrats	760	9.07	0	938	11.21	1	1
African Christian Democratic Party	160	1.91	0	161	1.92	0	0
Independent candidates	247	2.95	0				0
Total	8,383	100.00	5	8,370	100.00	5	10
Valid votes	8,383	97.72		8,370	97.70		
Invalid/blank votes	196	2.28		197	2.30		
Total votes	8,579	100.00		8,567	100.00		
Registered voters/turnout	16,334	52.52		16,334	52.45		

== May 2011 election ==
Party	Ward			List			Total seats
Party	Votes	%	Seats	Votes	%	Seats	Total seats
African National Congress	6,516	57.51	5	6,569	57.84	1	6
Democratic Alliance	4,815	42.49	1	4,788	42.16	4	5
Total	11,331	100.00	6	11,357	100.00	5	11
Valid votes	11,331	98.78		11,357	99.07		
Invalid/blank votes	140	1.22		107	0.93		
Total votes	11,471	100.00		11,464	100.00		
Registered voters/turnout	18,579	61.74		18,579	61.70		

== August 2016 election ==
Party	Ward			List			Total seats
Party	Votes	%	Seats	Votes	%	Seats	Total seats
African National Congress	5,972	50.14	5	6,134	51.59	1	6
Democratic Alliance	5,109	42.90	1	5,281	44.42	4	5
Economic Freedom Fighters	237	1.99	0	308	2.59	0	0
Independent candidates	421	3.53	0				0
Koukamma Independent Party	171	1.44	0	167	1.40	0	0
Total	11,910	100.00	6	11,890	100.00	5	11
Valid votes	11,910	98.39		11,890	98.20		
Invalid/blank votes	195	1.61		218	1.80		
Total votes	12,105	100.00		12,108	100.00		
Registered voters/turnout	20,413	59.30		20,413	59.32		

=== By-elections from August 2016 to November 2021 ===
The following by-elections were held to fill vacant ward seats in the period between the elections in August 2016 and November 2021.

Date	Ward	Party of the previous councillor	Party of the newly elected councillor
11 April 2018	2	Democratic Alliance	Democratic Alliance

== November 2021 election ==
Party	Ward			List			Total seats
Party	Votes	%	Seats	Votes	%	Seats	Total seats
African National Congress	4,595	44.38	5	4,957	48.33	1	6
Democratic Alliance	2,629	25.39	0	3,032	29.56	3	3
Patriotic Alliance	1,094	10.57	0	1,150	11.21	1	1
Independent candidates	1,280	12.36	1				1
Freedom Front Plus	270	2.61	0	313	3.05	1	1
Economic Freedom Fighters	257	2.48	0	293	2.86	0	0
Good	175	1.69	0	309	3.01	0	0
Compatriots of South Africa	45	0.43	0	113	1.10	0	0
African Transformation Movement	9	0.09	0	89	0.87	0	0
Total	10,354	100.00	6	10,256	100.00	6	12
Valid votes	10,354	97.76		10,256	97.40		
Invalid/blank votes	237	2.24		274	2.60		
Total votes	10,591	100.00		10,530	100.00		
Registered voters/turnout	20,645	51.30		20,645	51.01		

=== By-elections from November 2021 ===
The following by-elections were held to fill vacant ward seats in the period since the election in November 2021.

Date	Ward	Party of the previous councillor	Party of the newly elected councillor
14 Jun 2023	5	African National Congress	African National Congress
14 Aug 2024	1	African National Congress	African National Congress
28 May 2025	5	African National Congress	African National Congress
10 Sep 2025	1	African National Congress	Patriotic Alliance
26 Nov 2025	2	African National Congress	Patriotic Alliance

After the death of the previous ward five councillor, a by-election held on 14 June 2023 saw the African National Congress (ANC) retain its seat with 46%, with the Patriotic Alliance (PA) improving its 2021 result significantly, finishing second with 37%, up from 19%.

== November 2026 election ==
The following table shows the results of the 2026 election.

Party	Ward			List			Total seats
Party	Votes	%	Seats	Votes	%	Seats	Total seats
African National Congress	5,225	37.82	5	5,324	38.86	0	5
Patriotic Alliance	4,095	29.64	0	4,175	30.47	4	4
Democratic Alliance	3,056	22.12	1	3,154	23.02	2	3
Freedom Front Plus	444	3.21	0	451	3.29	0	0
People's Movement for Change	234	1.69	0	229	1.67	0	0
Independent candidates	450	3.26	0				0
African Christian Democratic Party	135	0.98	0	109	0.80	0	0
Economic Freedom Fighters	84	0.61	0	138	1.01	0	0
South African Communist Party	79	0.57	0	93	0.68	0	0
African Transformation Movement	13	0.09	0	27	0.20	0	0
Total	13,815	100.00	6	13,700	100.00	6	12
Valid votes	13,815	98.59		13,700	98.65		
Invalid/blank votes	198	1.41		187	1.35		
Total votes	14,013	100.00		13,887	100.00		
Registered voters/turnout	23,971	58.46		23,971	57.93		
