= Thornham, South Africa =

Thornham
- Thornham
- Location within Eastern Cape Location within South Africa
- Coordinates: 33.972°S 23.948°E
- Country: South Africa
- Province: Eastern Cape
- District: Sarah Baartman
- Municipality: Kou-Kamma

Area
  - Total: 2.81 km^{2} (1.08 sq mi)

Population (2011)
  - Total: 664
  - Density: 236/km^{2} (612/sq mi)

Racial makeup (2011)
  - Black African: 1.5%
  - Coloured: 96.7%
  - Indian/Asian: 1.8%

First languages (2011)
  - Afrikaans: 95.5%
  - English: 2.7%
  - Other: 1.8%
- Time zone: UTC+2 (SAST)
- PO box: 6307

Thornham is a town in the local municipality of Kou-Kamma, in Sarah Baartman District Municipality in the Eastern Cape province of South Africa.

== History ==
=== Family History ===
The 2 immigrants, William Thorne, a Brit, and Peter Cunningham, a Scot, were the forefathers of the people living in the town today. Some believed they arrived at Algoa Bay with the 1820 settlers and "chose westerly directions." Others believed they were sailors who deserted their ship. They settled in the Storms River area and bought Lot 4 of the Blueliliesbush farm on 10 May 1860, measuring 297 morgen 32 square roods or 254,4357 hectares from Johan Coenraad Terblans for 100 pounds. They both married coloured women and in later years, their descendants bought nearby portions of the Bluliliesbush farm.

Blueliliesbush got its name from the agapanthus that grows in the Tsitsikamma forest and have their "blue lily" flowers from December to April. Another white-owned portion of the original farm was called Blueliliesbush, so in 1955 when descendants of Cunningham and Thorne wanted to create their own postal agency, they changed the farm's name to Thornham (a combination of Thorne and Cunningham). Currently, "Thornham" is inscribed with white-washed rocks on the mountainside.

Johan Terblans, the man they bought the land from, had 2 slaves, Andries Jantjies and Amelia Augustus. He gave them the right to live on the farm and work the land for the rest of their lives in exchange for their labour. This was when slavery was abolished in the Cape Colony in 1834. When Thorne and Cunningham became the owners, Thorne took Jantjies as his servant and Cunningham took the other. Augustus and Jantjies later married and had 4 children: Andries, Frans, Rachel and Jan.

The Cunninghams had 6 children: George, Nancy, Lydia, Carline, Spars and Hendrick. The Thornes had 8: Cathrina, Sabina, Martha, William, Jan, George, Hendrick and Piet. The descendants of Thorne, Cunningham and Jantjies married each other. All but one of Jantjies children married into the farm and became communal property owners. Jan Jantjies married a Gelderblom woman from a settlement nearby and had to leave the farm.

=== Efforts to Update the Deceased Estate ===
Efforts were made to update the deceased estate of Thornham, focusing on Lots 1, 3, and 4. While some portions were transferred to living residents, Lot 4 remained registered under the names of the original owners, William Thorne and Peter Cunningham. Concerned about potential land loss, the community sought legal assistance from Lawson Brown and Brown, a Port Elizabeth law firm.

In the 1930s, the lawyers attempted various approaches to establish Thornham as a communally-owned settlement due to the challenges of administering the estates of deceased individuals and dividing the property among heirs. They explored options such as proclaiming the settlement as a communal reserve and introducing new legislation, but these efforts were unsuccessful. The lawyers even wrote to Prime Minister Jan Smuts in 1935, requesting a special Act of Parliament to transfer the farm to a corporate body elected by the community. However, they were referred back to the Secretary for Native Affairs.

In 1940, the lawyers drafted a bill called The Cunningham and Thorn (Settlement of Land) Act, proposing a Board of Management chaired by the Magistrate of Humansdorp to oversee the communal settlement. Despite their efforts, the Department of Native Affairs presented an alternative solution that ignored communal ownership and suggested a management structure with limited democracy.

The outbreak of World War II further hindered progress, as the government's focus and resources shifted. As official channels proved ineffective, the Thornham community took matters into their own hands. In 1968, they approached the Minister of Internal Affairs. To make their case stronger, they lied about there being 127 descendants living in Thornham, when that figure was actually around 80. They brought in people from Sandriff, who didn't belong there at all, so that 127 names could be counted.

After some bureaucratic processes, Lots 1, 3, and 4 were eventually transferred to Nicholas Etienne Botha and 126 others. Each registered owner received an affidavit as proof of their ownership, and certain restrictions were put in place, such as limitations on selling shares to outsiders. The community accepted the proposal that only legitimate children could become registered owners, while illegitimate children were granted full residence rights on the farm.
