= Thornham =

Thornham may refer to:

== England ==
- Thornham, Greater Manchester
- Thornham, Norfolk
- Thornham Magna, Suffolk
- Thornham Parva, Suffolk

== South Africa ==
- Thornham, Eastern Cape
