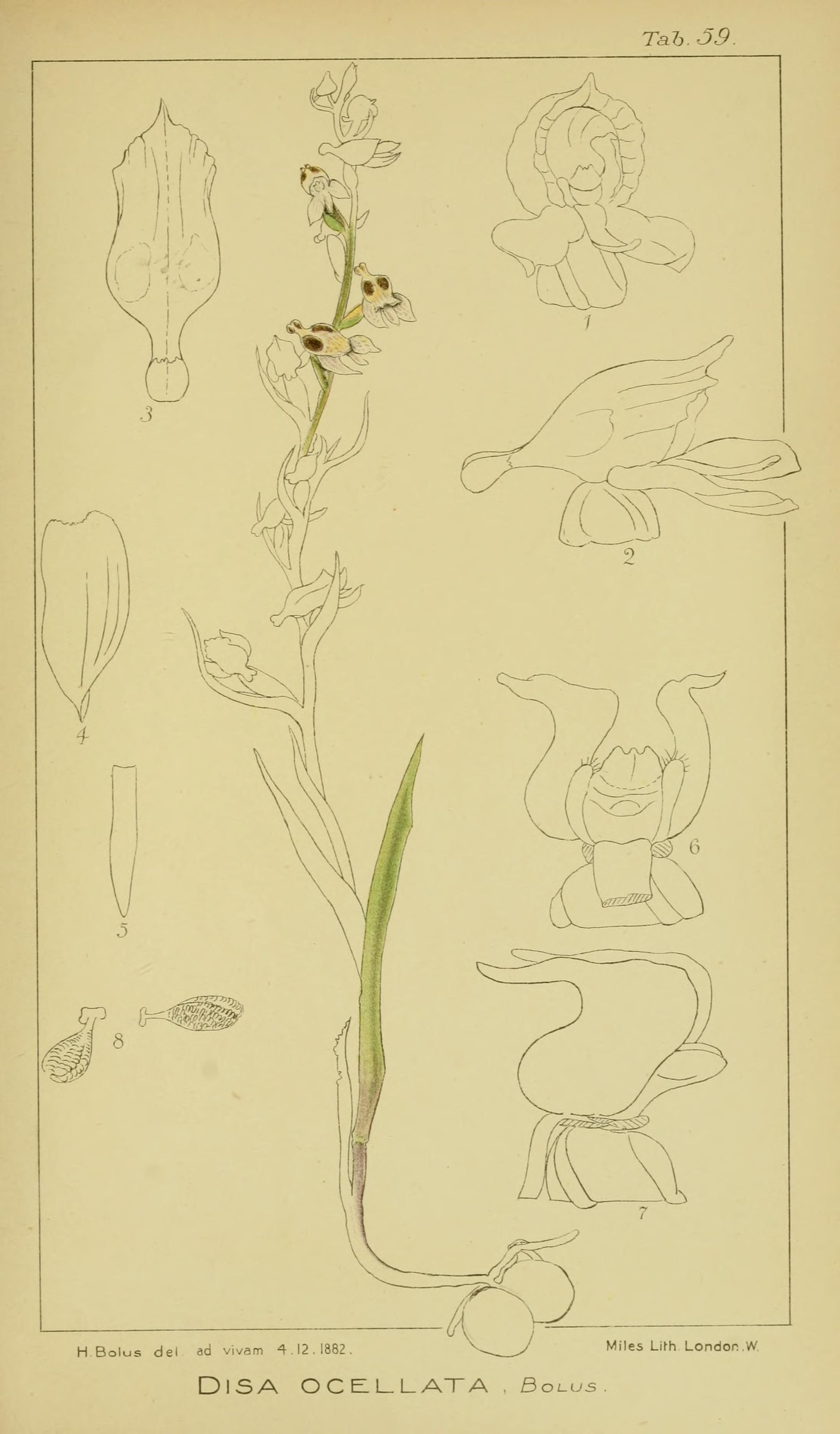

Scientific classification
- Kingdom: Plantae
- Clade: Tracheophytes
- Clade: Angiosperms
- Clade: Monocots
- Order: Asparagales
- Family: Orchidaceae
- Subfamily: Orchidoideae
- Genus: Disa
- Species: D. ocellata

Binomial name
- Disa ocellata Bolus

Synonyms
- Disa maculata Harv. ex Lindl.

= Disa ocellata =

Species of flowering plant

Disa ocellata is a perennial plant and geophyte belonging to the genus Disa and is part of the fynbos. The plant is endemic to the Western Cape and occurs from Table Mountain to the Kammanassie Mountains at altitudes of 1 000 - 1 500 m, on mountain peaks. The plant is considered rare.
