= Coldstream, South Africa =

Coldstream
- Location within Eastern Cape Location within South Africa
- Coordinates: 33.963°S 23.715°E
- Country: South Africa
- Province: Eastern Cape
- District: Sarah Baartman
- Municipality: Kou-Kamma

Area
  - Total: 2.53 km^{2} (0.98 sq mi)

Population (2011)
  - Total: 1,657
  - Density: 655/km^{2} (1,700/sq mi)

Racial makeup (2011)
  - Black African: 33.0%
  - Coloured: 62.1%
  - Indian/Asian: 0.1%
  - White: 4.0%
  - Other: 0.7%

First languages (2011)
  - Afrikaans: 72.4%
  - Xhosa: 22.7%
  - English: 2.9%
  - Other: 2.0%
- Time zone: UTC+2 (SAST)
- PO box: 6311

Coldstream is a village in Sarah Baartman District Municipality in the Eastern Cape province of South Africa.

The village lies east of Plettenberg Bay on the Tsitsikamma coast. The area is famous for a burial stone excavated here in 1910, depicting a prehistoric artist holding brush-feather and palette, indicating that rock paintings were being executed in South Africa some 2,000 years ago. Said to be named after a cold stream flowing past.
