= Stormsrivier =

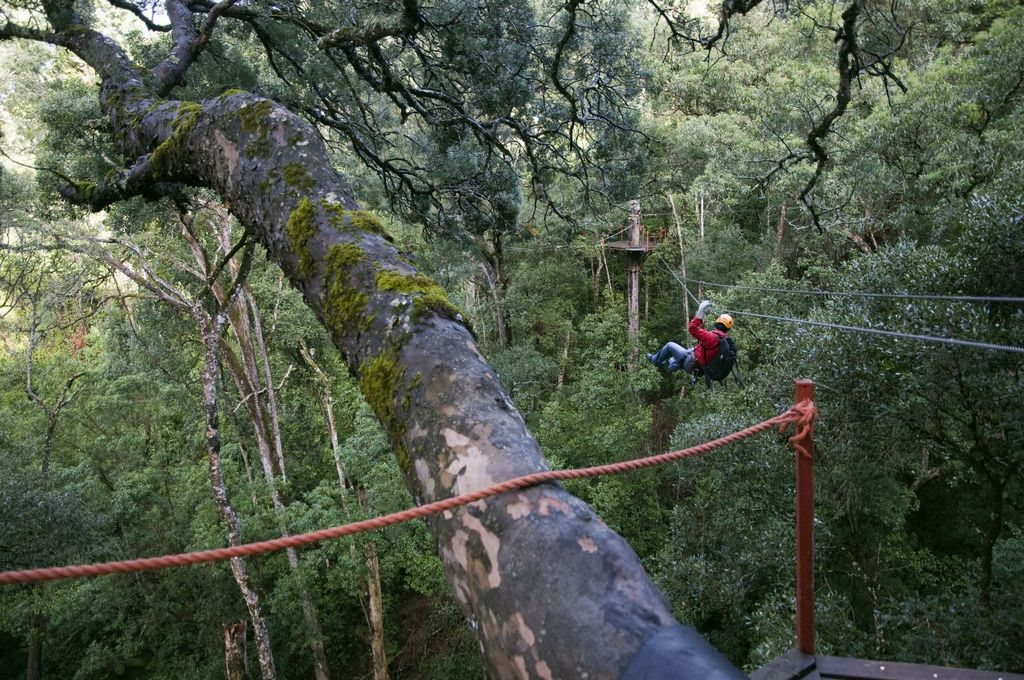
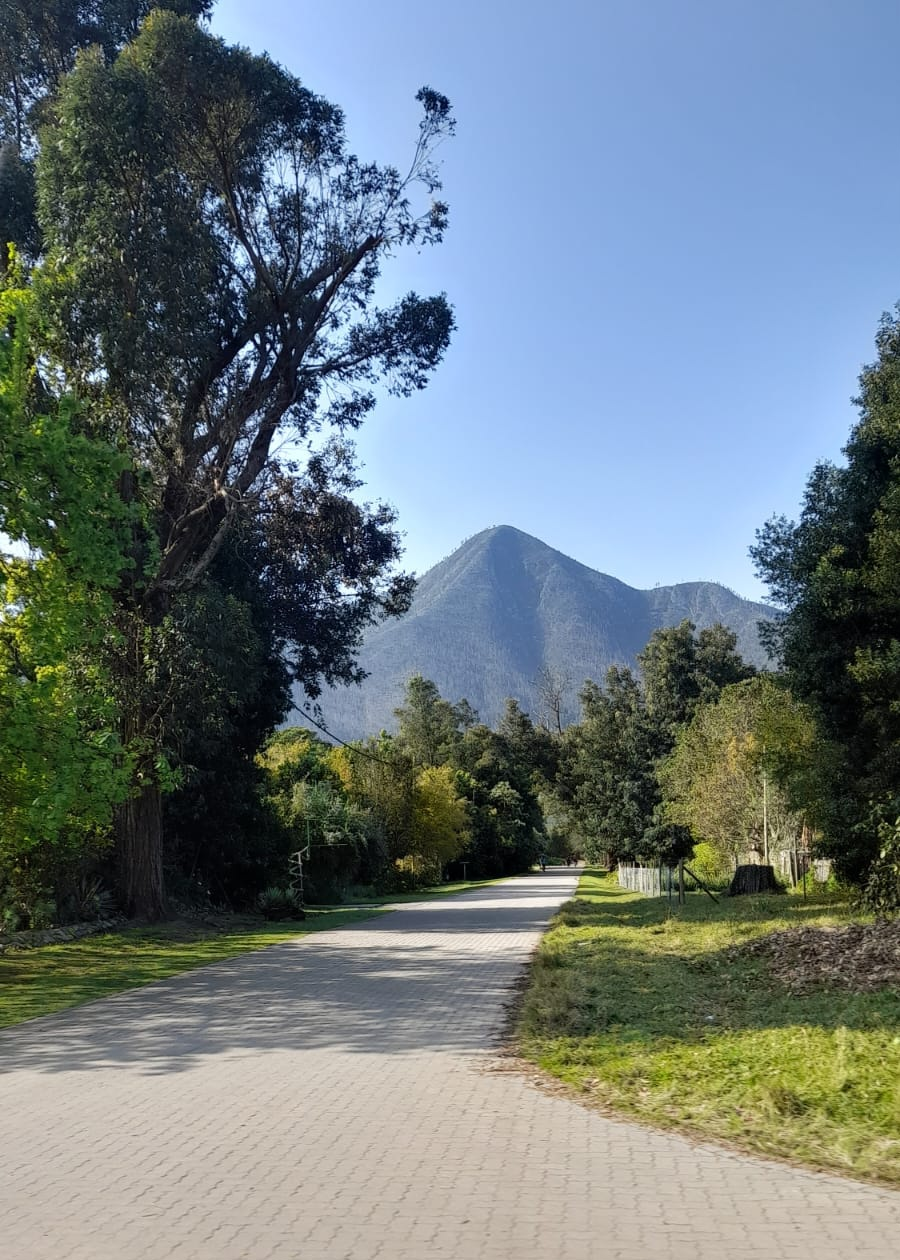
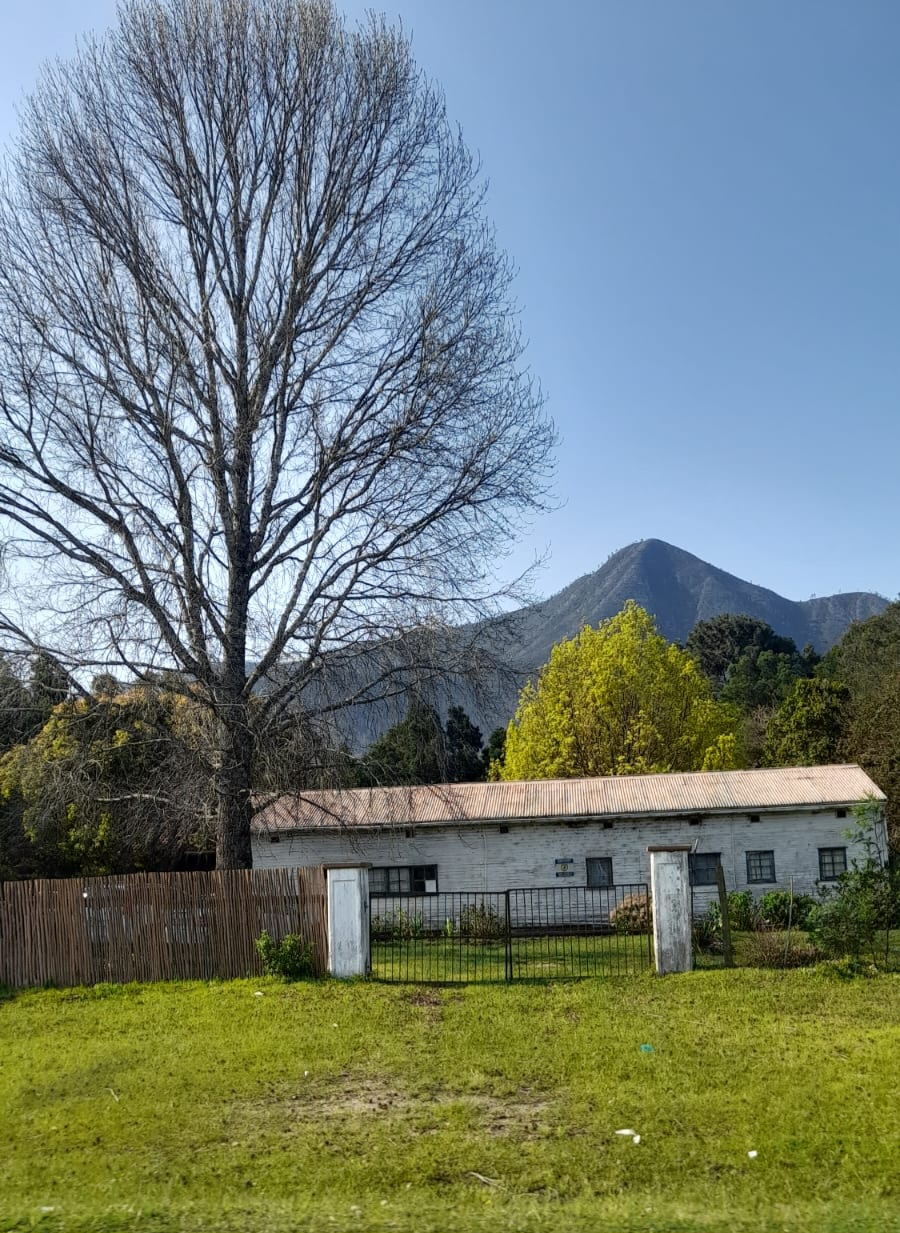
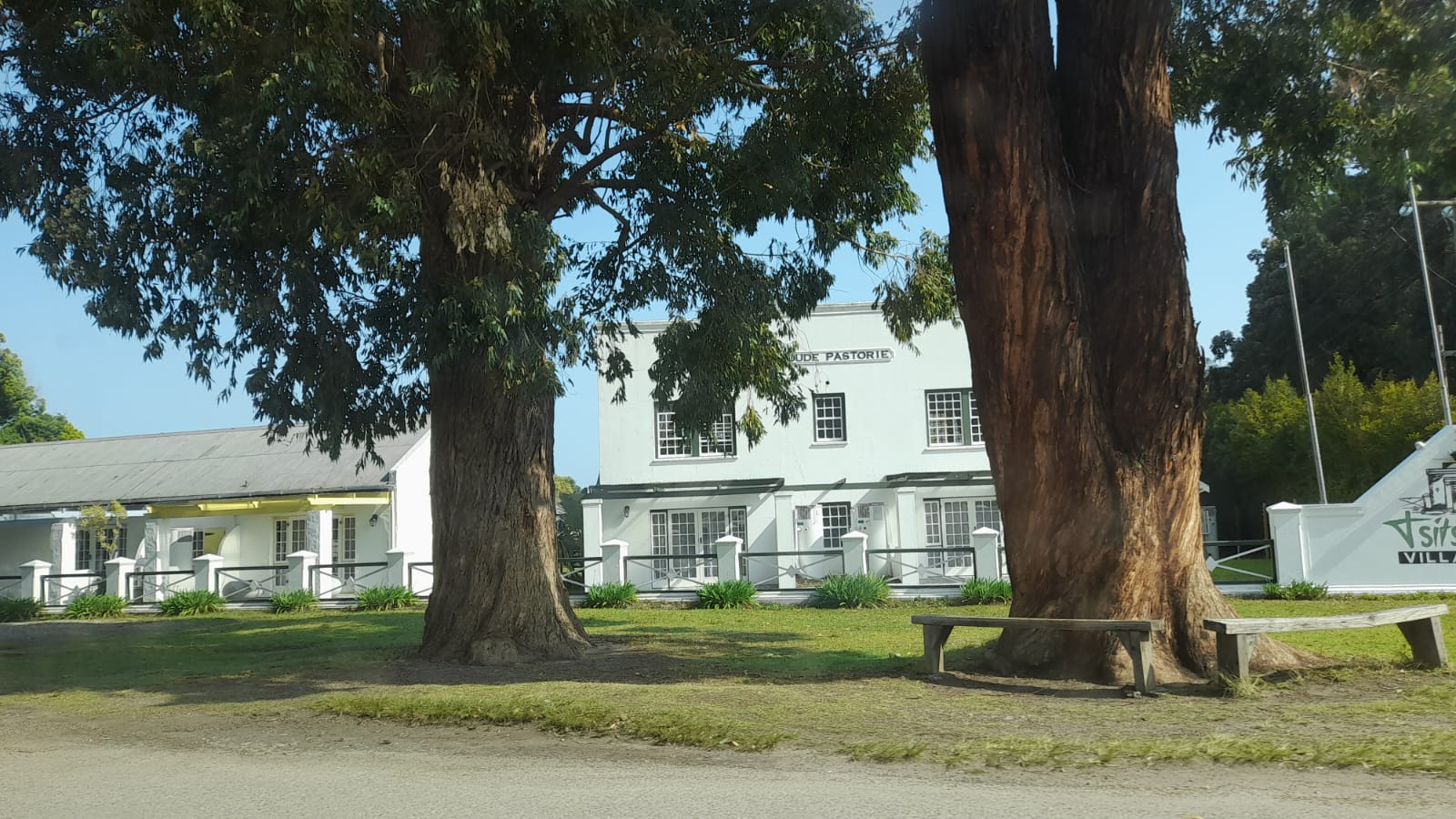
- Clockwise from Top: Canopy Tours, Assegai Street, De Oude Pastorie building, the Tsitsikamma Mountains seen from Stormsrivier

- Location within Eastern Cape Location within South Africa
- Coordinates: 33.966667°S 23.883333°E
- Country: South Africa
- Province: Eastern Cape
- District: Sarah Baartman
- Municipality: Kou-Kamma

Area
  - Total: 1.82 km^{2} (0.70 sq mi)

Population (2011)
  - Total: 1,670
  - Density: 918/km^{2} (2,380/sq mi)

Racial makeup (2011)
  - Black African: 43.0%
  - Coloured: 48.8%
  - Indian/Asian: 0.1%
  - White: 7.5%
  - Other: 0.5%

First languages (2011)
  - Afrikaans: 58.7%
  - Xhosa: 32.2%
  - English: 6.4%
  - Other: 2.8%
- Time zone: UTC+2 (SAST)
- PO box: 6308
- Area code: 042

Stormsrivier is a settlement in Sarah Baartman District Municipality in the Eastern Cape province of South Africa.

The village lies just off the N2 road. The majority of the residents live in RDP housing on the outskirts of the village.
