= Langkloof Mountains =

Mountain range in South Africa

Coordinates: 33°50′S 23°26′E

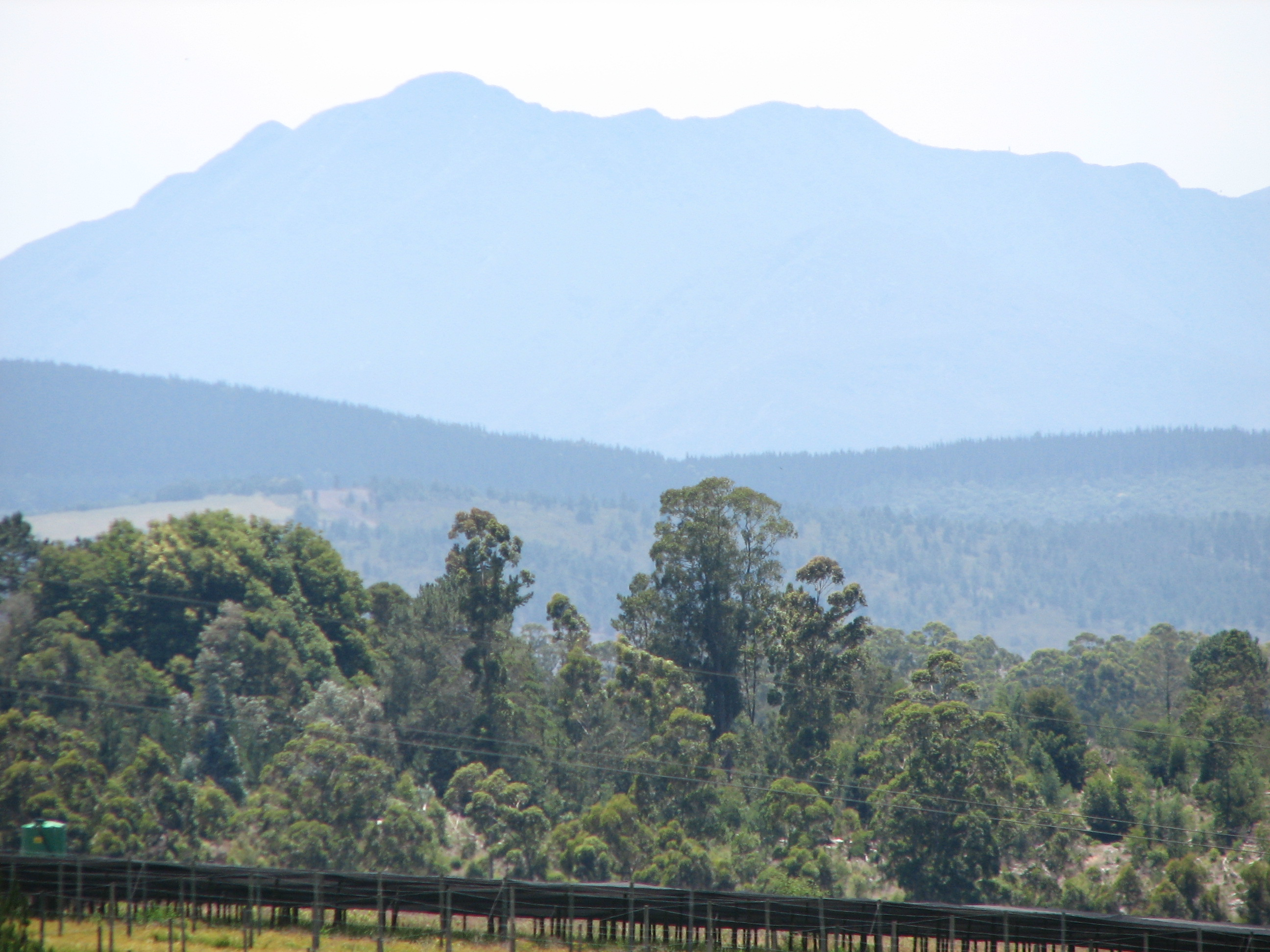
Langkloof Mountains from the N2 highway between Plettenberg Bay and Knysna

The Langkloof Mountains are a short mountain range within the Cape Fold Belt in the Western Cape of South Africa. They form a link between the Outeniqua and Tsitsikamma mountains to the north of Plettenberg Bay in the Garden Route region. The name "Langkloof" means "long ravine" and was derived from Dutch.

The upper Langkloof mountains are located between the Outeniqua and Kammanassie Mountains, while the lower Langkloof mountains fall between the Kouga and Tsitsikamma mountains. They stretch from Prince Alfred's Pass in the west to just north of Nature's Valley and south of Joubertina.
