= South African Institute for Heritage Science and Conservation =

Higher learning institution

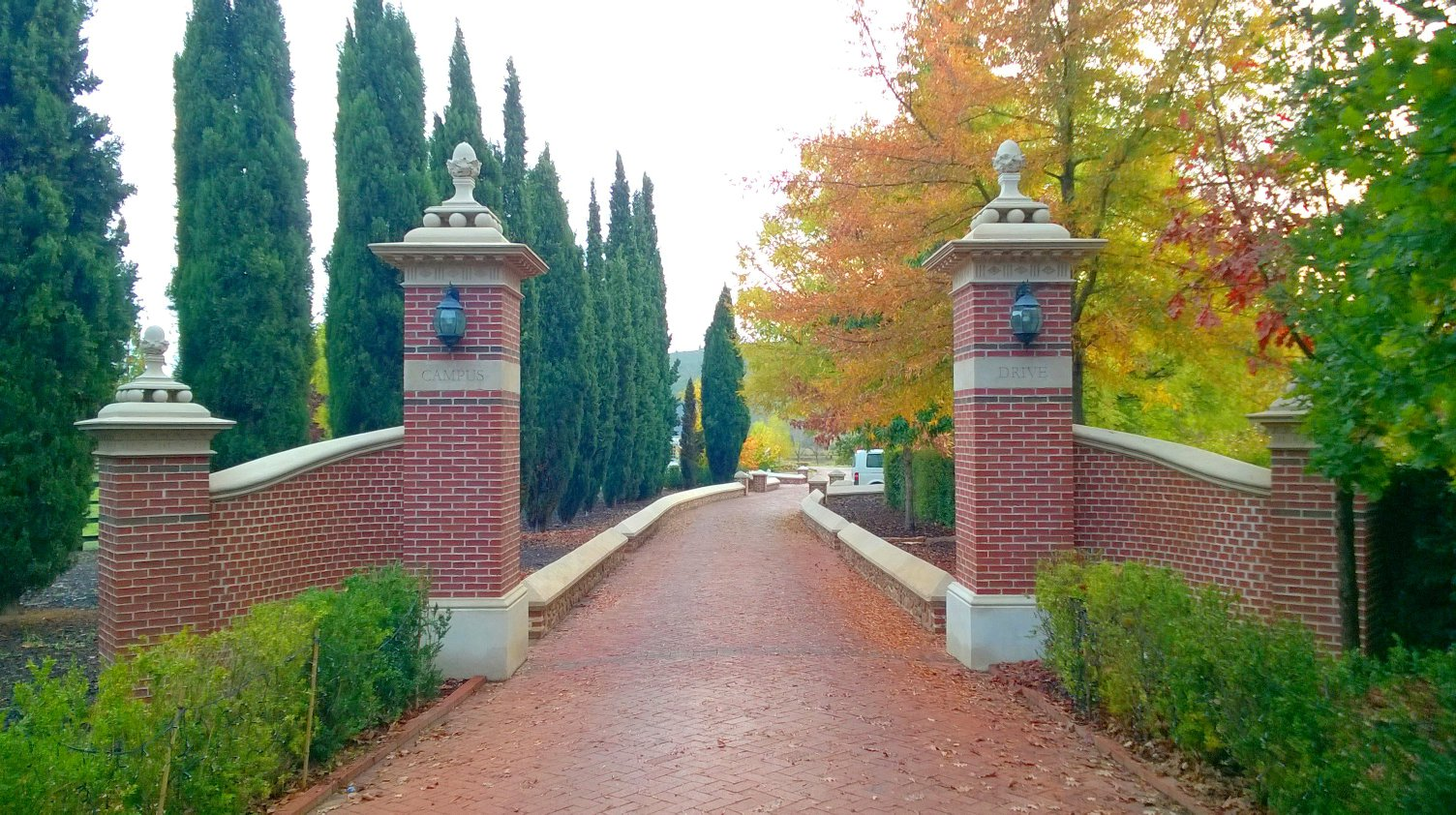
- Entrance to Institute via Campus Drive
- Type: Higher learning institution
- Established: 1994
- Location: Twee Riviere, South Africa

The South African Institute for Heritage Science and Conservation is a higher learning institution, founded in 1994. The institute's faculty buildings and support facilities are situated on a 15-hectare campus in the village of Twee Riviere, in the Langkloof valley, adjacent to the Southern Cape Region of South Africa. This is also the seat of its resident, full-time, postgraduate academic programme, which admits a maximum of twelve students annually for postgraduate studies in the specialist domain of conservation science.

== Accreditation ==
In mid-2015, the Institute brought its maiden accreditation bid before South Africa's Council on Higher Education, shortly afterwards declaring the likely prospects of such a programme offering, provisionally scheduled for launch in 2017. The accreditation of the postgraduate diploma programme was formally granted in December 2016. During 2017, the South African Qualifications Authority (SAQA) formally listed this NQF Level 8 academic programme on the National Qualifications Framework (NQF).

== Faculty of Physical Sciences: Postgraduate diploma programme ==
The institute conducts an academic training programme in the form of a nominally one-year, resident, postgraduate diploma programme, "Technical Studies in Conservation". The postgraduate diploma programme is open to undergraduate candidates, subject to entry prerequisites. The postgraduate diploma comprises twelve modules, amounting to a total of 130 credits, and is the academic equivalent of a "graduate diploma" - the matching academic level descriptor which is applied in certain other countries (e.g. Australia). The level descriptor matches the academic significance which it holds in the UK, per example. The programme is structured as a trimester programme, conducted from January/February to October/November of each year. Conservation specialisms within the programme include the conservation of historic metals, stone and mortar, artwork on paper, and ceramics.

== Masters programme ==
A conservation masters programme, relying in part on course work and partly on a research project, is currently under development at this institution. The institute has indicated its intention to seek accreditation for such a M.Sc. Technical Conservation programme during 2021 or 2022.

== Faculty of Commerce ==
This institution's second faculty has developed a short course series titled "Entrepreneurship for the Non-urban Context". Relying on established though neglected traditions, this short course series revisits unexpected approaches, offering express relevance for entrepreneurship in the present time - and with particular application to rural settings.

== Elisabeth FitzHugh Conservation Library ==
The institute is home to a comprehensive conservation textbook and reference library, which supports the study programme. The formerly privately held Elisabeth FitzHugh conservation volume collection forms the core of the library collection held at the institute, also lending its name to the research collection overall.

== Campus cafeteria ==
The campus cafeteria, The Belfry Kitchen, stands in service of the campus hospitality arm, which provisions faculty, staff and students with residence, meals, internet connectivity, laundry and postal services.

== Campus gardens ==
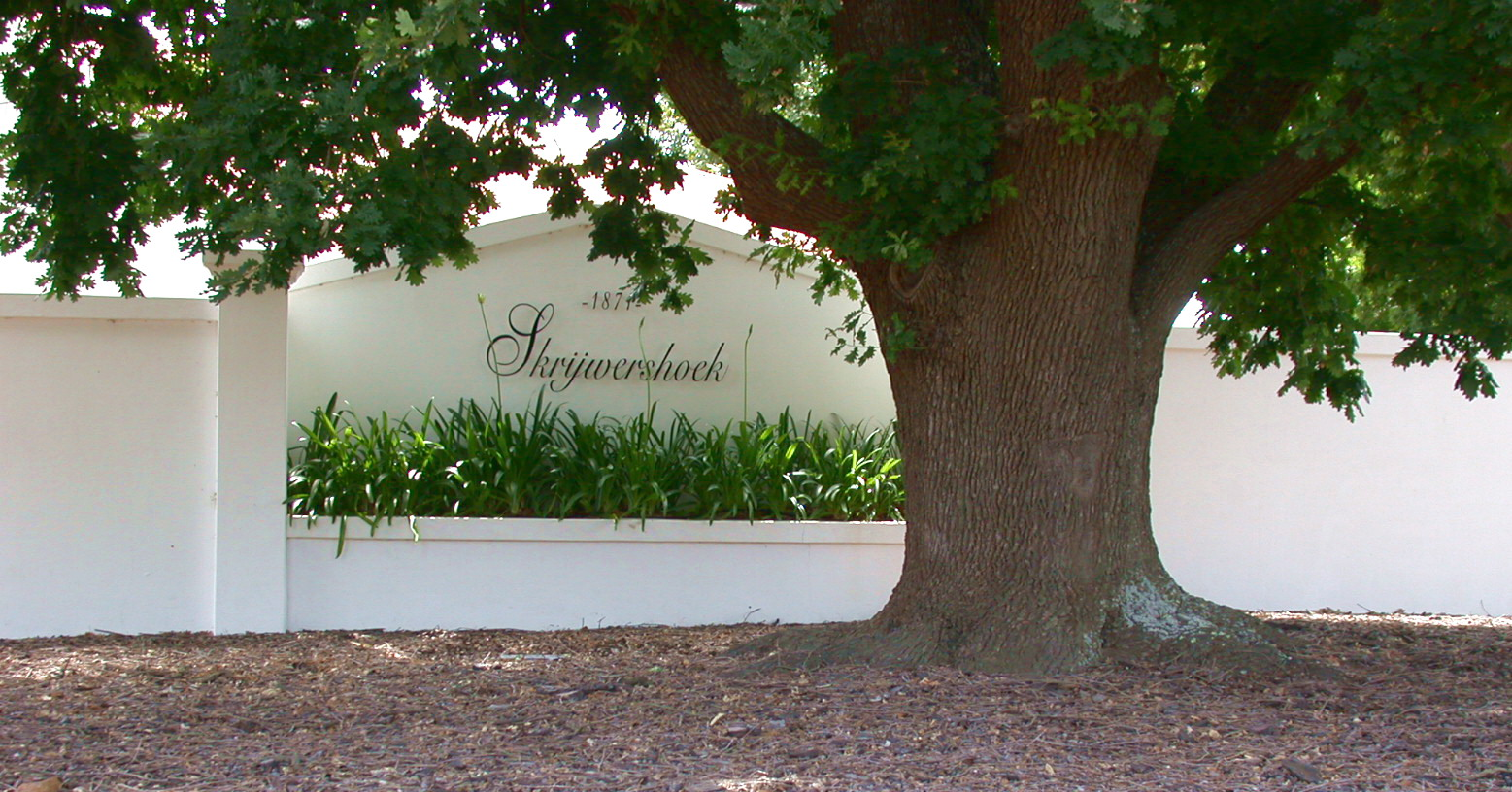
Campus arboretum - autumn 2016

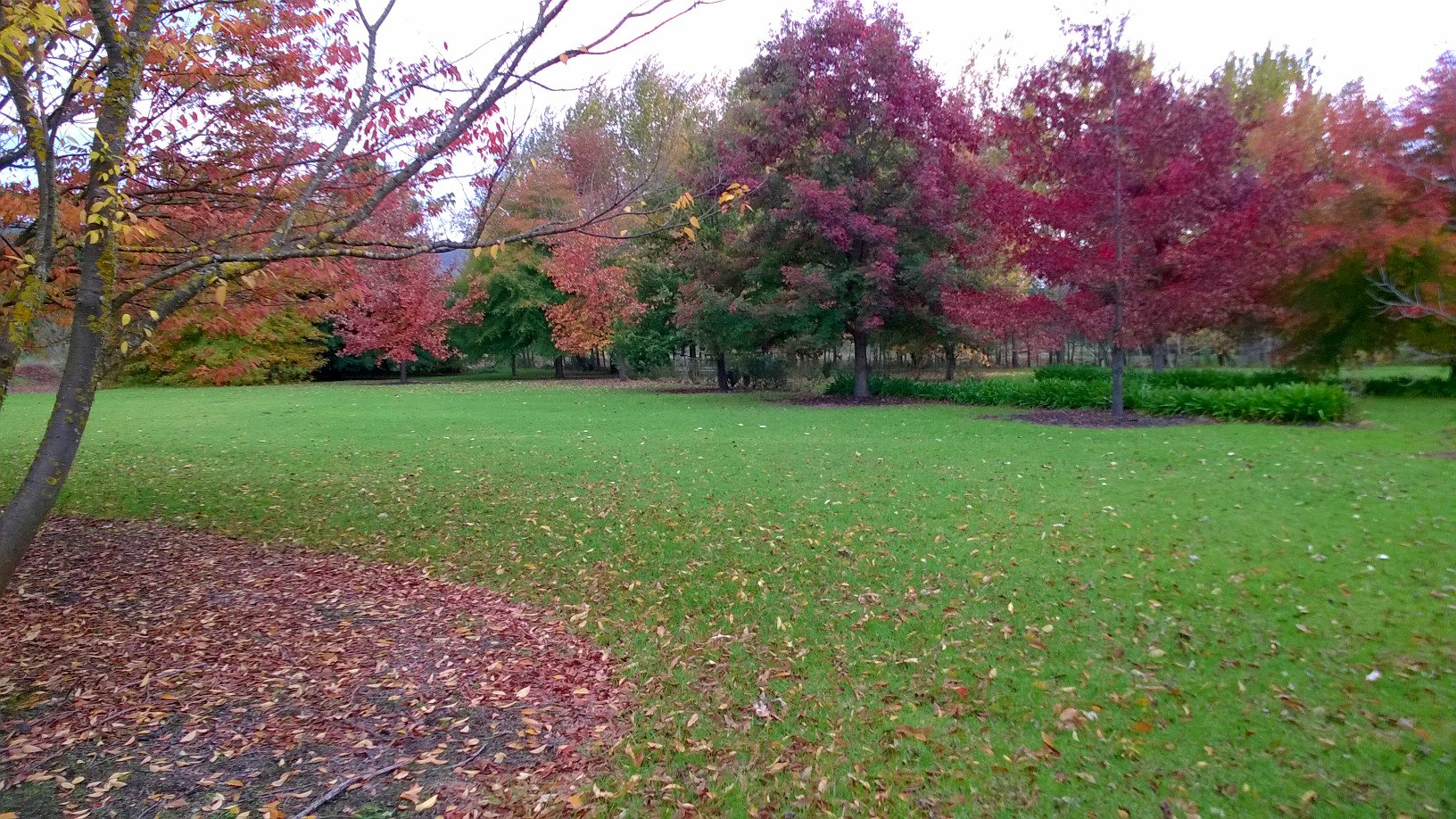
Campus arboretum - autumn 2016

The campus gardens comprise several hectares of landscape specimen trees. Plantings have been arranged as an arboreal tree collection with predominant emphasis on autumn colouring specimens. The core collection varies from 16 – 24 years in age, and planting has resumed in recent years to expand the collection's physical extent and range.
