= Kareedouw =

Town in the Eastern Cape, South Africa

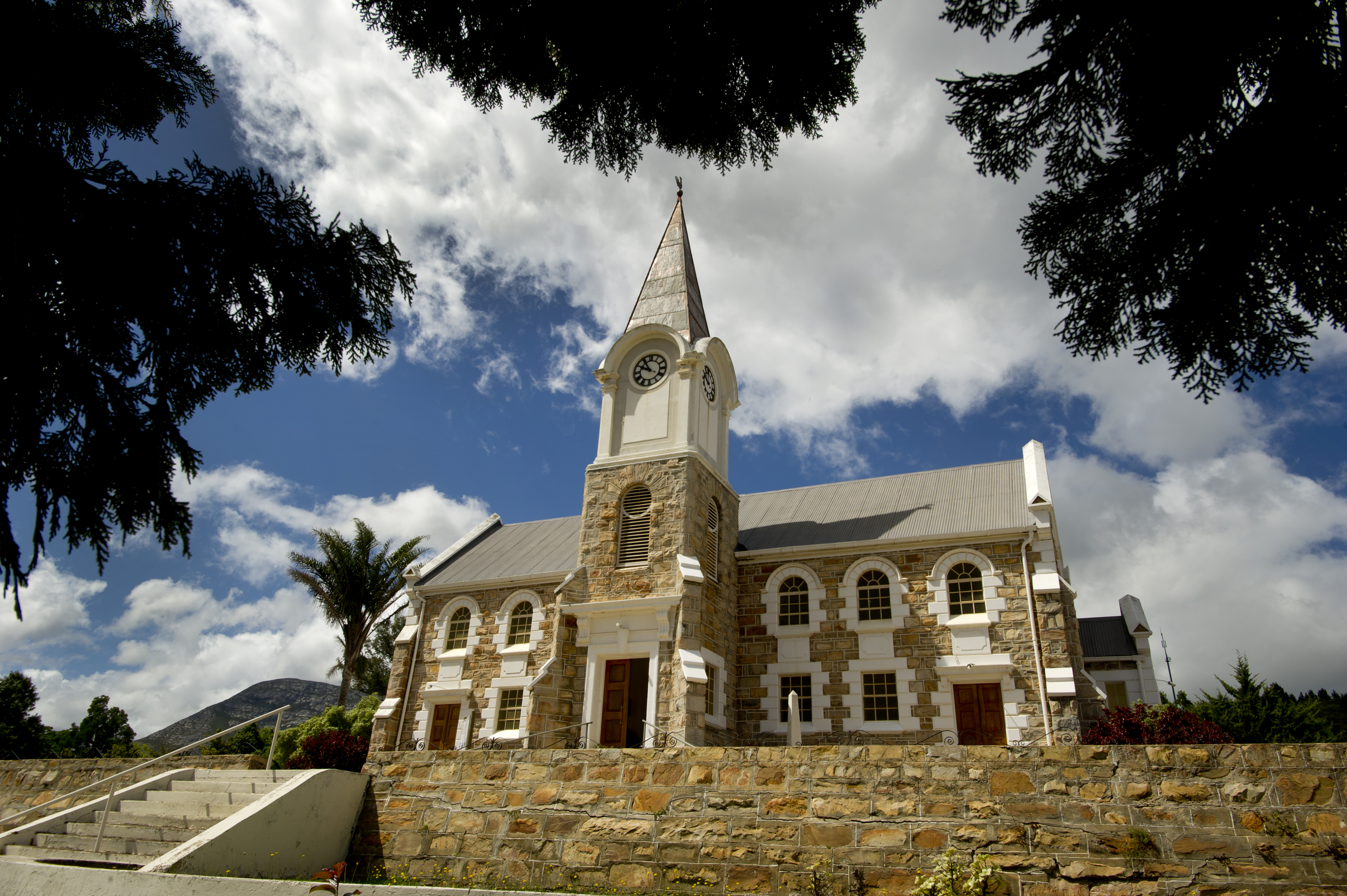
- Nederduits Gereformeerde Kerk church in Kareedouw

- Location within Eastern Cape Location within South Africa
- Coordinates: 33°57′7″S 24°17′22″E
- Country: South Africa
- Province: Eastern Cape
- District: Sarah Baartman
- Municipality: Kou-Kamma

Area
  - Total: 15.10 km^{2} (5.83 sq mi)

Population (2011)
  - Total: 4,985
  - Density: 330.1/km^{2} (855.0/sq mi)

Racial makeup (2011)
  - Black African: 32.8%
  - Coloured: 56.5%
  - Indian/Asian: 0.3%
  - White: 9.5%
  - Other: 1.0%

First languages (2011)
  - Afrikaans: 72.6%
  - Xhosa: 22.1%
  - English: 2.4%
  - Other: 2.9%
- Time zone: UTC+2 (SAST)
- Postal code (street): 6400
- PO box: 6400
- Area code: 042

Kareedouw (English: Kareedowns) is a town in the Eastern Cape province of South Africa. It is the administrative centre for the Kou-Kamma Municipality in the Sarah Baartman District of the Eastern Cape.

== History ==
The town's name derives from the Khoi phrase "karee" meaning "praise". The town was established by white settlers around the year 1750.

== Well known Places and Schools in Kareedouw ==
=== Schools ===
- High School Paul Sauer.
- Kareedouw Primary School.
- Qhayiyalethu Intermediate School.

=== Places ===
- Norma Jeans (restaurant.

== Tourism ==
Kareedouw is the gateway to the Langkloof Mountains; 120 km from Gqeberha. It nestles between the Tsitsikamma and Suuranys Mountains. A popular activity is 4x4 trips through the Suurveld, Kouga and Baviaanskloof Wilderness areas, canoe trips on the Kouga River, and camping and hiking trails.

One important person connected to the town is John Vorster, prime minister of South Africa from 1966 to 1978, who had a house on the coast and is buried in the cemetery next to the

- Balthazar Johannes Vorster lies buried under a large black marble slab in "heroes' acre" in the remote Eastern Cape town of Kareedouw, at the foot of the Langkloof. ... As late as 2002, the Kareedouw hospital still treated black and white patients at separate entrances...

== Locations ==
There is a Kareedouw Peak and a Kareedouw Pass.

The Tsitsikamma mountains are a mountain range located in the Garden Route region of the southern South African coast in the Western Cape and Eastern Cape provinces. They stretch just over 80 km from the Keurbooms River in the west just north of Plettenberg Bay, to Kareedouw Pass in the east. The Formosa Conservation Area is adjacent to the Jagersbos farm, about 15 km west of Kareedouw.

There are medical and pharmaceutical facilities, the provincial B.J. Vorster Hospital, a public library, and a Lutheran Missionary Monument at or near Kareedouw.
