= Misgund =

- Location within Eastern Cape Location within South Africa
- Coordinates: 33.755°S 23.498°E
- Country: South Africa
- Province: Eastern Cape
- District: Sarah Baartman
- Municipality: Kou-Kamma

Area
  - Total: 0.78 km^{2} (0.30 sq mi)

Population (2011)
  - Total: 415
  - Density: 530/km^{2} (1,400/sq mi)

Racial makeup (2011)
  - Black African: 40.2%
  - Coloured: 57.3%
  - Indian/Asian: 0.2%
  - White: 0.7%
  - Other: 1.4%

First languages (2011)
  - Afrikaans: 65.5%
  - Xhosa: 29.2%
  - S. Ndebele: 1.4%
  - Tswana: 1.2%
  - Other: 2.7%
- Time zone: UTC+2 (SAST)
- PO box: 6440
- Area code: 042

Misgund is a town in Kou-Kamma Local Municipality in the Eastern Cape province of South Africa. The name is Afrikaans and means "begrudged".
