= Kou-Kamma Local Municipality =

Kou-Kamma
- Local municipality
- Seal

- Location in the Eastern Cape
- Coordinates: 33°57′S 24°17′E
- Country: South Africa
- Province: Eastern Cape
- District: Sarah Baartman
- Seat: Kareedouw
- Wards: 6

Government
  - Type: Municipal council

Area
  - Total: 3,593 km^{2} (1,387 sq mi)

Population (2011)
  - Total: 40,663
  - Density: 11.32/km^{2} (29.31/sq mi)

Racial makeup (2011)
  - Black African: 30.6%
  - Coloured: 59.8%
  - Indian/Asian: 0.3%
  - White: 8.2%

First languages (2011)
  - Afrikaans: 73.8%
  - Xhosa: 19.9%
  - English: 2.7%
  - Sotho: 1.1%
  - Other: 2.5%
- Time zone: UTC+2 (SAST)
- Municipal code: EC109

Kou-Kamma Municipality (Afrikaans: Kou-Kamma Munisipaliteit; Xhosa: uMasipala wase Kou-Kamma) is a local municipality in South Africa. It is situated in the southwest corner of the Sarah Baartman District Municipality along the Indian Ocean coastline, in the southwestern sector of South Africa's Eastern Cape province. To the west lies the Western Cape. Kou-Kamma also borders the Dr Beyers Naudé Local Municipality in the north and the Kouga Local Municipality to the east. The geographical area of the municipality is 12,540 square kilometres.

Its name is a blend of the names of the Kouga (Kou-) and Tsitsikamma (-Kamma) mountains, which in turn were named after the rivers Kouga and Tsitsikamma.

The municipality is a relatively poor area with high unemployment and low levels of literacy. Settlements tend to be scattered, which has posed challenges to the provision of infrastructure and basic services such as water, sanitation, and electricity. The Kou-Kamma Municipality is composed of two distinct regions: the coastal belt (referred to as the Tsitsikamma or the Western Coastal Zone, which includes settlements such as Coldstream, Stormsrivier and Clarkson), and the inland area of the Langkloof (including settlements such as Kareedouw, Tweeriviere, Joubertina and Louterwater). The two areas are separated by the Tsitsikamma Mountains. The nature of the two areas differs vastly. The Coastal Zone is characterised by a diverse and fast-growing economy driven by tourism and agriculture, a fast-growing population linked to the economic opportunities, a good water supply, and a wealth of holiday destinations and indigenous forests. In contrast, employment in the Langkloof is characterised by seasonal agriculture with high labour requirements. The area has greater challenges in terms of sufficient water supply, with additional pressure due to a high population growth related to migrant labour.

== Main places ==
The 2001 census divided the municipality into the following main places:

Place	Code	Area (km^{2})	Population	Most spoken language
Boskop	20901	1.03	531	Xhosa
Coldstream	20902	3.26	954	Afrikaans
Joubertina	20903	2.68	845	Afrikaans
Kagiso Height	20904	0.09	854	Xhosa
Kareedouw	20905	1.67	743	Afrikaans
Krakeel Rivier	20907	1.23	1,667	Afrikaans
Louterwater	20908	1.03	2,535	Afrikaans
Sandrif	20909	1.63	1,872	Afrikaans
Stormsrivier	20910	1.67	598	Afrikaans
Thornham	20911	3.85	1,026	Afrikaans
Tsitsikamma National Park	20912	11.05	284	Afrikaans
Tweeriviere	20913	0.64	3,995	Afrikaans
Uitkyk	20914	1.21	2,303	Afrikaans
Witelsbos	20915	2.47	42	Afrikaans
Woodslands	20916	0.35	1,304	Afrikaans
Remainder of the municipality	20906	3,541.35	14,729	Afrikaans

== Politics ==
The municipal council consists of eleven members elected by mixed-member proportional representation. Six councillors are elected by first-past-the-post voting in six wards, while the remaining five are chosen from party lists so that the total number of party representatives is proportional to the number of votes received.

In the election of 4 November 2026 no party won a majority. The African National Congress (ANC) obtained a plurality of five seats.

The following table shows the results of the election.

Party	Ward			List			Total seats
Party	Votes	%	Seats	Votes	%	Seats	Total seats
African National Congress	5,225	37.82	5	5,324	38.86	0	5
Patriotic Alliance	4,095	29.64	0	4,175	30.47	4	4
Democratic Alliance	3,056	22.12	1	3,154	23.02	2	3
Independent candidates	450	3.26	0				0
6 other parties	989	7.16	0	1,047	7.64	0	0
Total	13,815	100.00	6	13,700	100.00	6	12
Valid votes	13,815	98.59		13,700	98.65		
Invalid/blank votes	198	1.41		187	1.35		
Total votes	14,013	100.00		13,887	100.00		
Registered voters/turnout	23,971	58.46		23,971	57.93		
