= Joubertina =

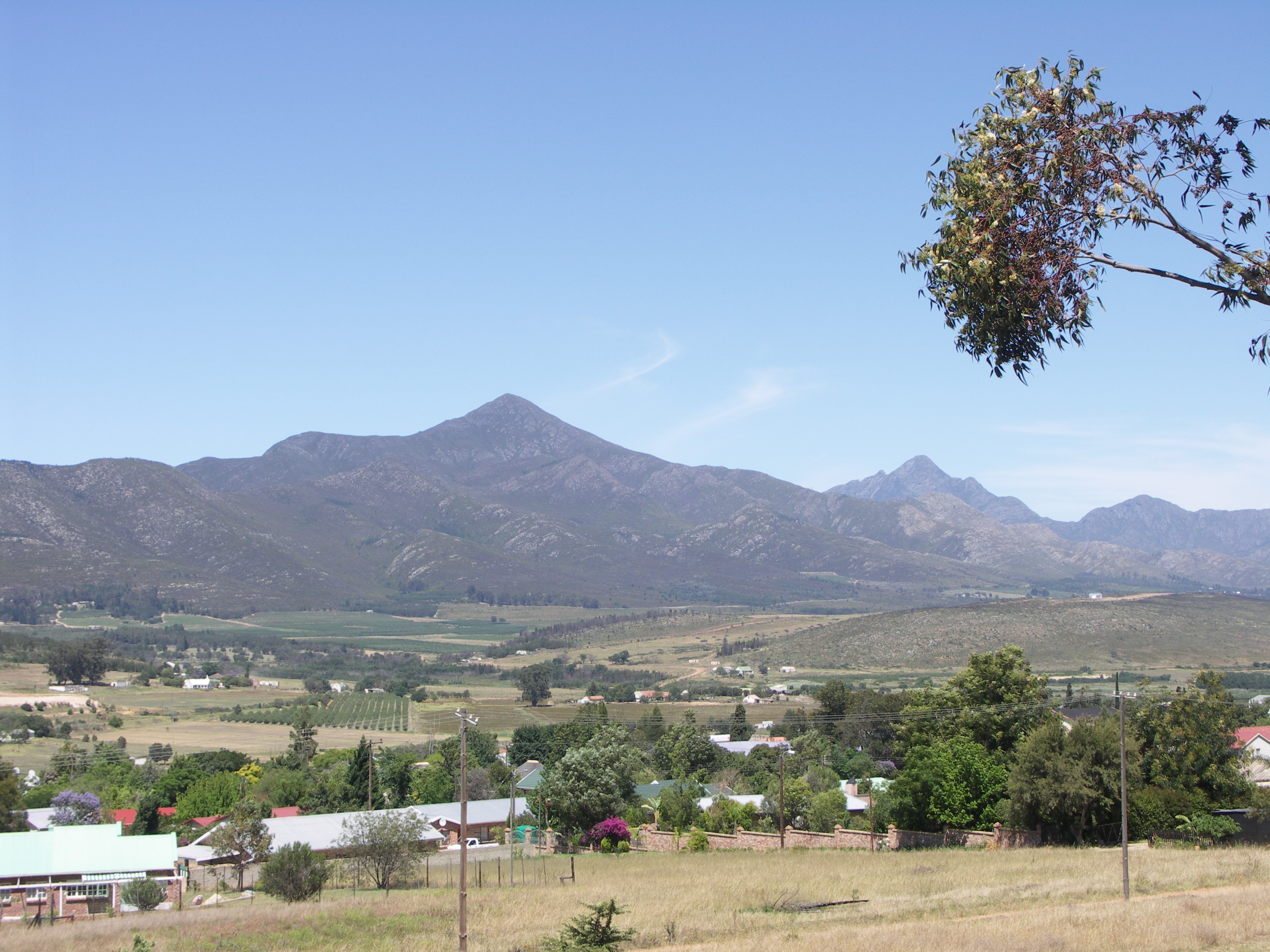
- Joubertina

- Location within Eastern Cape Location within South Africa
- Coordinates: 33°49′30″S 23°51′28″E
- Country: South Africa
- Province: Eastern Cape
- District: Sarah Baartman
- Municipality: Kou-Kamma

Area
  - Total: 8.20 km^{2} (3.17 sq mi)

Population (2011)
  - Total: 5,752
  - Density: 701/km^{2} (1,820/sq mi)

Racial makeup (2011)
  - Black African: 16.8%
  - Coloured: 73.5%
  - Indian/Asian: 0.3%
  - White: 9.0%
  - Other: 0.5%

First languages (2011)
  - Afrikaans: 87.6%
  - Xhosa: 6.4%
  - English: 3.2%
  - Other: 2.9%
- Time zone: UTC+2 (SAST)
- Postal code (street): 6410
- PO box: 6410
- Area code: 042

Joubertina is a small town in the Kou-Kamma Local Municipality, Sarah Baartman District of the Eastern Cape province of South Africa.

== Description ==
Town on the Wabooms River in the Langkloof, some 50 km north-west of Assegaaibos, 70 km south-east of Avontuur and 213 km from Port Elizabeth. Joubertina was founded and introduced into the Langkloof community in 1907. Having secured a portion of the farm Onzer, in between the villages of Krakeel and Twee Riviere (both founded in 1765), a property development was launched there under the initiative of the Dutch Reformed Church. As the sale of erven around a newly erected church building gradually got underway in 1907, the future town was named in honour of W A Joubert, minister of the Dutch Reformed Church in Uniondale between 1878 and 1893.

Joubertina is located on the R62 road in the Langkloof valley, approximately 5 km west of Twee Riviere, near the western extreme of the Eastern Cape.

The town has a station on the narrow gauge Avontuur Railway.
