= Kammanassie Mountains =

Mountain range in South Africa

- Location within South Africa

Highest point
- Peak: Mannetjiesberg
- Elevation: 1,995 m (6,545 ft)
- Coordinates: 33°37′20″S 22°53′20″E

Geography
- Range coordinates: 33°37′S 22°54′E

The Kammanassie Mountains (Kammanassieberge in Afrikaans) are a mountain range in the Western Cape, South Africa. The highest peak is Mannetjiesberg at 1,955 metres above sea level and the mountain range is one of the prominent east-west trending ranges composing the southern branch of the Cape Fold Belt.

== Etymology ==
The pre-colonial occupants of the Kammanassie Nature Reserve area were the San and Khoi, who mainly occupied the low-lying areas and consequently had minor impact on the higher-lying upland vegetation types. The hunter-gathering San may have deliberately burnt the vegetation to encourage game to concentrate on new growth and to stimulate growth and reproduction of edible bulbs. While the pastoralists Khoi were reported to have habitually burnt the vegetation to provide pasture for sheep. It is believed that these Khoi herders may have pushed the San into the more marginal mountain and as a result changed the fire regime through regular patch-burning.

By the end of the eighteenth century, European farmers occupied the lower-lying foothills and valley lands and used the mountains for grazing. These early European settlers in the area moved their sheep to low-lying areas during winter and burnt the mountain vegetation in late winter or early spring to provide summer grazing. This practice of burning vegetation to provide pasture was continued until the introduction of fire protection areas in the late nineteenth century.

The registered title deeds recognising the State Forest portions of the Kammanassie date back to 1878. One hundred years later, in 1978, the importance of conserving the unique gene pool of the last six remaining Cape Mountain Zebra in the Kammanassie region became a formal conservation priority. The area was then known as the Langkloof StateForest. The management of the area was then transferred to the Cape Provincial Administration, Department of Nature and Environmental Conservation in 1992, the Department changed its name to Cape Nature Conservation and then to the Western Cape Nature Conservation Board (trading as CapeNature) in 2001. CapeNature is the current responsible authority for the management and conservation of the Kammanassie Nature Reserve as it is now known.

The Kammanassie Mountains was formed as a result of north-south oriented compressive stress during the Cape Orogeny 123-200 million years ago. The Kammanassie mountain range comprises almost exclusively the resistant quartz arenites of the Table Mountain Group, overlain on the lower slopes by the shale of the Bokkeveld group.

== Geology ==
The Kammanassie Mountain is one of the prominent east-west trending ranges composing the southern branch of the Cape Fold Belt. It was formed as a result of north-south oriented compressive stress during the Cape Orogeny 123-200 million years ago. The Kammanassie mountain range comprises almost exclusively the resistant quartz arenites of the Table Mountain Group, overlain on the lower slopes by the shale of the Bokkeveld group.

Soils generally form a thin (<1 m) veneer of silty sands/sandy silts as a result of the steepslopes of the Kammanassie Mountain and predominantly quartzitic rocks. Locally clayey soils occur in association with weathered shale horizons, and in particular the Cederbergformation. Lithosols (Mispah and Glenrosa forms) are dominant on the steep slopes. They are shallow, infertile, acidic and have minimal B-horizon development, with a low water retention capacity. The soil is deeper at the foot of the mountain in kloofs and along the southern aspects where a fairly deep red-yellow sandy to sandy loam soil occurs (Hutton, Clovely and Griffin forms).

== Hydrology ==
=== Catchment area ===
The Kammanassie catchment drains into the Olifants (to the north) and Kammanassie (to the south) rivers. These two east to west flowing rivers drain the eastern section of the Klein Karoo and their confluence is south-east of Oudtshoorn. The important area for agricultural irrigation is limited to the area below the Stompdrift dam which is situated in the Olifants river to the northwest of the Kammanassie Nature Reserve. The northern slopes of the Kammanassie Mountain make up only 5% of the dam's catchment but account for 28% of the annual inflow. The southern slopes make up 11% of the Kammanassie dam (situated in the Kammanassie River to the southwest of the Kammanassie Nature Reserve) catchment area, but account for 18% of the mean annual inflow into the dam. The mean annual run off from the southern slopes is 43.1 mm which accounts for 9,3% of the average rainfall in the area. On the northern slopes, the mean annual run off drops to 24.9 mm which accounts for 6,5% of the average rainfall. The Kammanassie Catchment Area is an important source of water for the agricultural activities located adjacent to the mountain and in the Olifants River valley.

=== Rivers ===
There is a total of 29 rivers originating in the Kammanassie catchment area. Amongst the rivers of the Kammanassie Nature Reserve, the Wilge River has been identified as a national FEPA. Furthermore, the Wilge River and its associated sub-catchment also provide sanctuary for some indigenous and threatened fish species. The upstream area of the Marnewicks River serves as an important support area for fish species conservation.

Other important rivers include:

- Huisrivier
- Bergrivier
- Dieprivier
- Kleinrivier
- Kluesrivier
- Buffelskliprivier
- Rooirivier
- Kleinplaasrivier
- Witboojsrivier
- Vermaaksrivier

== Climate ==
The reserve receives rain throughout the year with an average annual rainfall of approximately 450 mm. The highest annual rainfall of 1 216 mm and lowest of 242 mm were recorded in 1981 and 1984 respectively. The hottest months on the Kammanassie Nature Reserve are December to February with maximum temperatures of 35 °C. The coldest months are June and July with minimum temperatures reaching -4 °C.

== Topography ==
Mannetjiesberg is the highest peak of the Kammanassie Nature Reserve at 1955.3 m above sea level. The second highest peak is the peak west of Mannetjiesberg at 1908 m above sea level. The Kammanassieberg is 1854 m above sea level. The lowest elevations occur along the western boundary of the catchment and are approximately 350 m above sea level.

== Fauna ==
There are 37 mammal species recorded for the Kammanassie Nature Reserve. A number of small antelope species occur on the reserve. Various predators including the Cape leopard (Panthera pardus) and Caracal (Caracal caracal).

Indigenous large mammal species known to have occurred historically in the Klein Karoo area, but which are not present on the Kammanassie Nature Reserve are Buffalo (Synceruscaffer), Eland (Taurotragus oryx) and Lion (Panthera leo). Elephant (Loxodonta africana) is likely to have moved through the Klein Karoo, especially along the river courses (Olifants River), but according to Skead (2011) no firm historical records have been found.

Cape Mountain Zebra (Equus zebra zebra; CMZ) is the only known mammal species of special concern in the Kammanassie Nature Reserve. Cape Mountain Zebra are classified as vulnerable in the IUCN Red List. Cape Mountain Zebra once had a distribution running southward across the mountainous terrain of the Roggeveld Mountains, the Cederberg Mountains and up to the Amatolas in the Eastern Cape. As a result of hunting and competition with farmers for grazing, however, they were driven to the verge of extinction such that by 1950, fewer than 100 individuals of this species survived. The only original natural populations remaining are in the Mountain Zebra National Park and the Kammanassie and Gamkaberg Nature Reserves.

The two smallest relic populations of Cape Mountain Zebra occur in the Kammanassie and Gamka Mountains. With small populations, severe population bottlenecks can have serious genetic consequences. This can reduce genetic variation and leave populations open to the effects of inbreeding, with continuing loss of genetic diversity due to genetic drift. If left uncontrolled, inbreeding may reach levels where fitness is compromised thereby leading to extinction. The Kammanassie population is critically important for the maintenance of the genetic diversity of Cape Mountain Zebra and accounts for a third of the genetic variation of the meta-population.

The major water sources utilised by Cape Mountain Zebra on the Kammanassie Nature Reserve are natural springs situated on the mountain. These springs supply a constant source of clean drinking water for numerous different animal species on the Kammanassie Nature Reserve. The drying up of these springs as a result of underground water abstraction has required the use of artificial watering points. The Kammanassie Cape Mountain Zebra population is no longer able to rely on natural springs for drinking. Cape Mountain Zebra numbers are monitored opportunistically with sightings being recorded in the State Of Biodiversity database. Camera traps have been installed in areas known to be frequented visited by Cape Mountain Zebra and these data will be used to develop the Kammanassie Cape Mountain Zebra studbook.

A 2018 aerial survey of the Kammanassie area recorded 37 Cape mountain zebra. In October 2023, the same survey was repeated and 57 Cape mountain zebra were counted.

== Flora ==
The majority of the northern slopes of the Kammanassie Nature Reserve consists of Northern Kammanassie Sandstone Fynbos while Southern Kammanassie Sandstone Fynbos is the dominant vegetation type found on the southern slopes of the Kammanassie. Central Island Shale Band Vegetation is found along the Cederberg shale bands of the Kammanassie Mountain. All three of these vegetation types have been classified as Least Threatened (LT).

=== Invasive Alien Plants ===
A number of alien plant species occur on the Kammanassie Nature Reserve. Hakea and pine are the two dominant alien invasive plants species on the Kammanassie.

== Human activity ==
=== Impact of the Klein Karoo Water Supply Scheme ===
The Klein Karoo Rural Water Supply Scheme (KKRWSS) was constructed within the Vermaaks River valley of the reserve and on private and communal land adjacent to the reserve during 1990 to 1993. This scheme supplies purified domestic water to the Dysselsdorp community and the farming communities along the Olifants River Valley westwards to the Gamka River Valley near Calitzdorp. Abstraction commenced in 1993. The scheme, which is currently managed by Oudtshoorn Municipality abstracts approximately 1.1 million m³ groundwater per annum.

Since abstraction started there have been frequent complaints and allegations that the scheme is having detrimental environmental and socio-economic impacts. Numerous springs on the Kammanassie Nature Reserve have dried up and the vegetation in the Vermaaks River Valley started showing signs of water stress. Some farmers have also had to cease their farming activities due to their main water supply drying up or being drastically reduced.

Limits have been set by Dept of Water Affairs on the volume of water that may be abstracted by the scheme, but over-abstraction is frequently taking place. Oudtshoorn Municipality argues that they cannot stop pumping water due to a high demand from the water users. Several attempts to address this problem have been made by CapeNature - through having meetings with Oudtshoorn Municipality, Dept of Water Affairs and other stakeholders - but have had little to no effect. There is an urgent need for intervention at a very high political level to address this problem. It is also critical that the groundwater ecological reserve needs to be determined in terms of the National Water Act, (Act No. 36 of 1998) and implemented.

== Conservation ==
The Kammanassie Nature Reserve falls within the Cape Floristic Kingdom, which is the smallest and the richest of the six floral kingdoms in the world. The Reserve is situated between Uniondale, De Rust in the north-west and Dysselsdorp in the west. Uniondale, De Rust, Dysselsdorp and Oudtshoorn are the closest towns to the nature reserve. The Kammanassie nature reserve is approximately 53 km long and 12 km wide at its widest point and lies in an east/west orientation. The perimeter of the reserve is 131.8 km. The total area of the mountain range, managed by CapeNature is 49 430 ha, of which 22 374 ha is privately owned declared mountain catchment area. The remaining 27 056 ha is state-owned land. The Kammanassie Nature Reserve is situated between the coordinates 33°33’50”S and 33°37’10”S and 22°27’29”E and 23°01’55”E.
