= Sarah Baartman District Municipality =

Sarah Baartman old: Cacadu
- District municipality
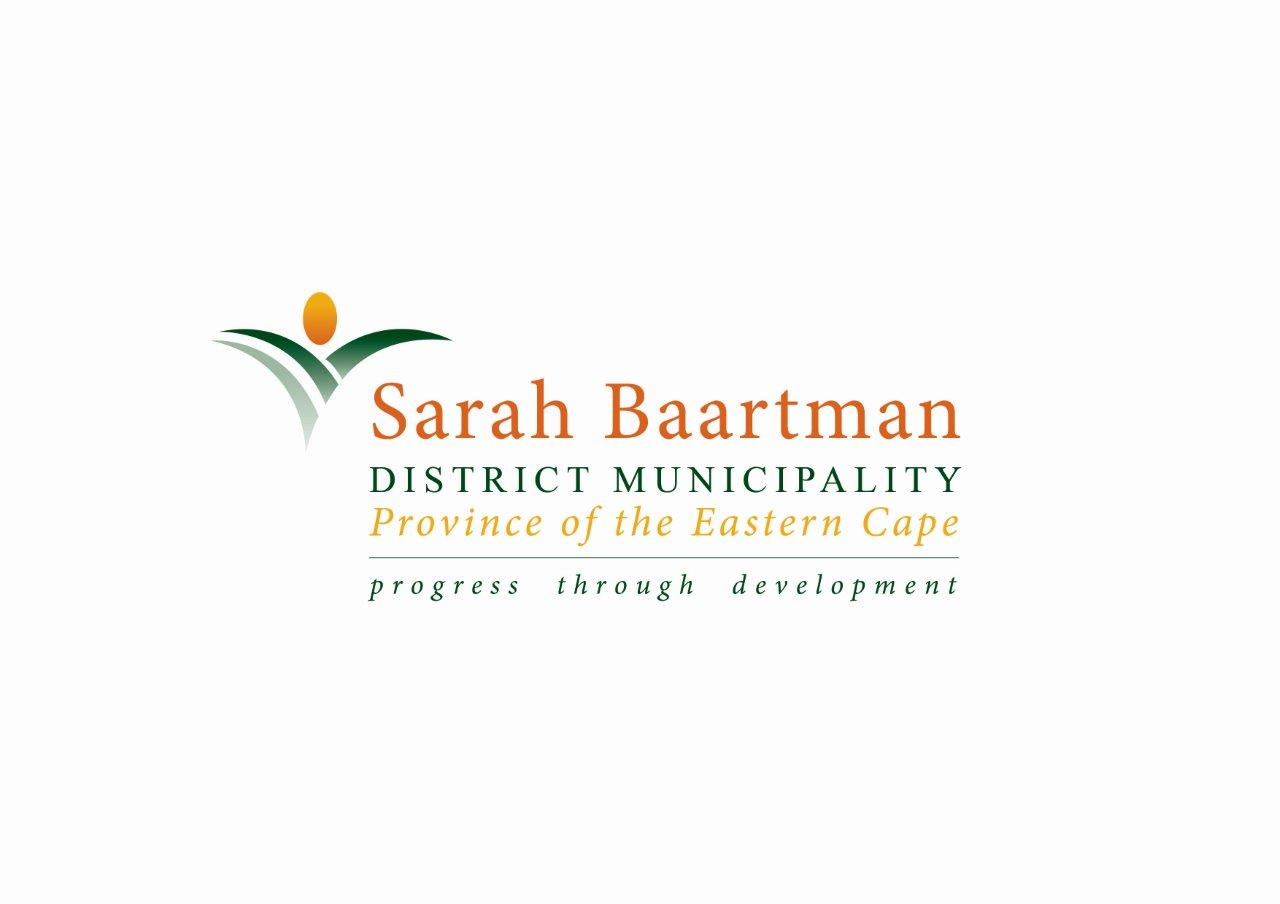
- Seal

- Location in the Eastern Cape
- Interactive map of Sarah Baartman District Municipality (2026)
- Coordinates: 33°57′S 25°36′E
- Country: South Africa
- Province: Eastern Cape
- District: Sarah Baartman District Municipality
- Seat: Gqeberha
- Local municipalities: List: Dr Beyers Naudé; Blue Crane Route; Makana; Ndlambe; Sundays River Valley; Kouga; Kou-Kamma

Government
  - Type: Municipal council
  - Mayor: Khunjuzwa Eunice Kekana (ANC)

Area
  - Total: 58,194 km^{2} (22,469 sq mi)

Population (2011)
  - Total: 450,584
  - Density: 7.7428/km^{2} (20.054/sq mi)

Racial makeup (2011)
  - African: 53.3%
  - Coloured: 34.9%
  - Indian/Asian: 0.3%
  - White: 10.9%

First languages (2011)
  - Xhosa: 45.4%
  - Afrikaans: 45.1%
  - English: 6.5%
  - Other: 3%
- Time zone: UTC+2 (SAST)
- Municipal code: DC10

The Sarah Baartman District Municipality (Xhosa: uMasipala weSithili sase Sarah Baartman; Afrikaans: Sarah Baartman-distriksmunisipaliteit), formerly the Cacadu District Municipality, is situated in the western part of the Eastern Cape province of South Africa, covering an area of 58,242 square kilometres. The area of the district municipality includes seven local municipalities. The seat is the city of Gqeberha, although Gqeberha is not itself in the district (it is in the Nelson Mandela Bay Metropolitan Municipality). As of 2011, the languages most spoken among the 388,201 inhabitants were Xhosa and Afrikaans. The district code is DC10.

The municipality is a multi-ethnic administration, formed through the merging of the predominantly Afrikaans-speaking western part of the Eastern Cape, together with Xhosa areas near the Fish River, and the English district of Albany (with its own distinctive local culture, dating back to the 1820 settlers).

The name Cacadu is regarded by the Xhosa as covering the entire area of the district municipality, but in fact it is taken from a river that runs entirely in Gqeberha. Cacadu, meaning "bulrush water", is the Xhosa form of the Khoekhoe name of the river. The Dutch name is a translation: Papenkuils (in Afrikaans a bulrush is called a papkuil). The river rises in the Parsons Vlei and runs to the sea close to the Gqeberha industrial suburb of Deal Party.

In 2015, the municipality was renamed for Saartjie "Sarah" Baartman (1789–1815), a Khoikhoi woman who was taken to London to perform at freak shows and after her death her remains were exhibited until 1974. The renaming is part of an effort to redress marginalisation of the Khoikhoi people.

== Government ==
The Executive Mayor of Sarah Baartman District Municipality is Deon De Vos, and the Municipal Manager is Unathi Daniels.

== Geography ==
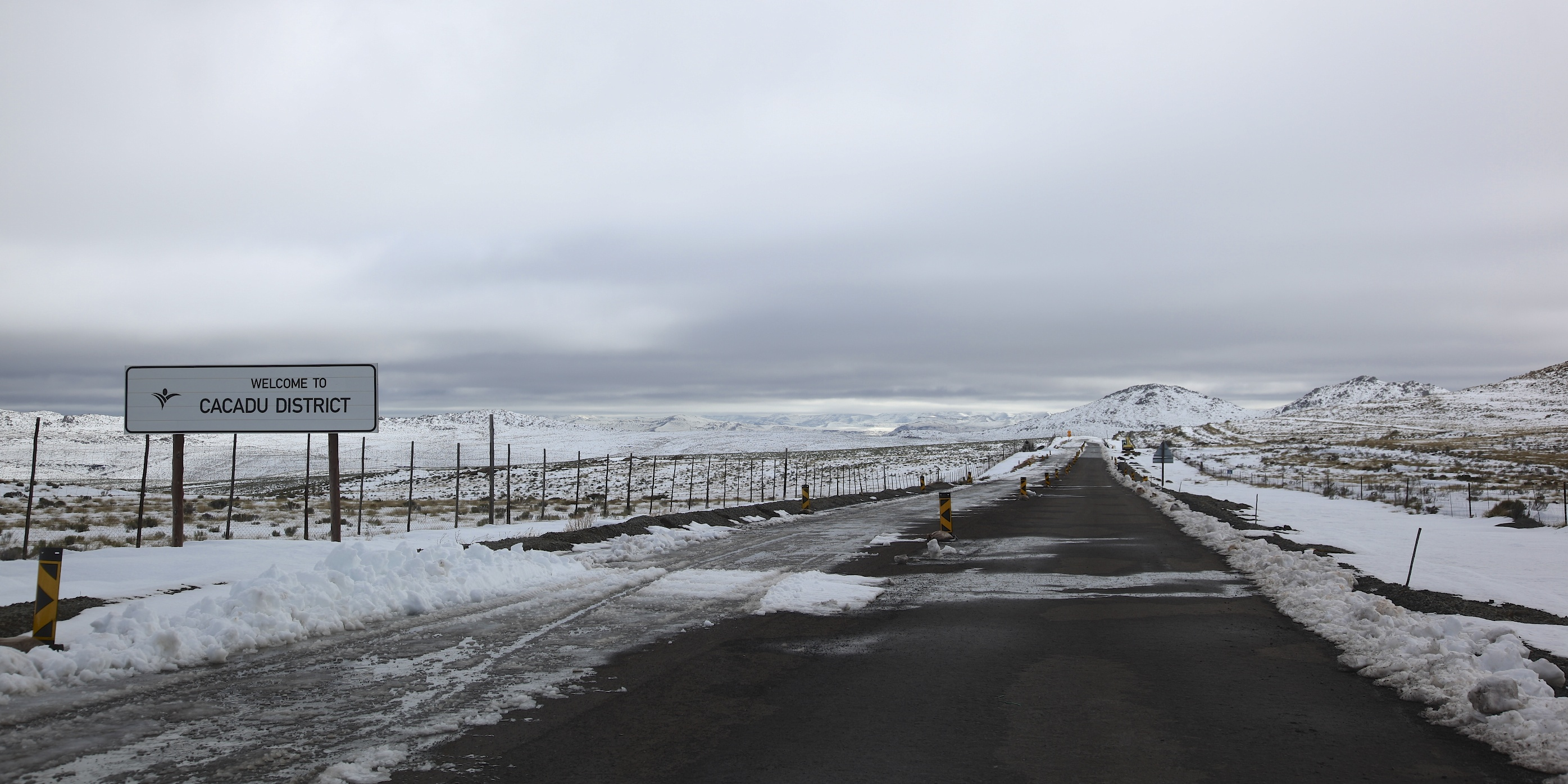
Entering Sarah Baartman District from Chris Hani District on the R61 between Cradock and Graaff-Reinet on an unusually snowy winters day in 2012.

The Sarah Baartman district covers an area of 58,243 square kilometres (22,488 sq mi) in the southwestern part of the Eastern Cape province. It extends to the Great Fish River in the east and the Sneeuberge in the north. The metropolitan area around Gqeberha is excluded from the district, being in the Nelson Mandela Bay Metropolitan Municipality.

The southwestern part of the district (west of Gqeberha) is marked by several ranges of mountains that run parallel to the sea, including the Baviaanskloof mountains, the Kouga mountains and the Tsitsikamma mountains. In the southeastern part (east of Port Elizabeth) is the Albany region around the city of Grahamstown. The northern interior of the district is the southeastern end of the Karoo.

To the west the district borders on the Garden Route and Central Karoo districts of the Western Cape; to the north it borders on the Pixley ka Seme district of the Northern Cape; and to the east it borders on the Chris Hani and Amathole districts of the Eastern Cape.

Sarah Baartman district is divided into seven local municipalities, as below:

Name	Seat	Population (2011)	Area (km^{2})	Density (inhabitants/km^{2})
Blue Crane Route Local Municipality	Somerset East	36,002	11,068	3.3
Dr Beyers Naudé Local Municipality	Graaff-Reinet	79,291	28,653	2.8
Makana Local Municipality	Grahamstown	80,390	4,376	18.4
Ndlambe Local Municipality	Port Alfred	61,176	1,841	33.2
Sundays River Valley Local Municipality	Kirkwood	54,504	5,994	9.1
Kouga Local Municipality	Jeffreys Bay	98,558	2,670	36.9
Kou-Kamma Local Municipality	Kareedouw	40,663	3,642	11.2
Total		450,584	58,243	7.7

After the municipal elections on 3 August 2016, the Camdeboo, Ikwezi and Baviaans municipalities were merged to form the new Dr Beyers Naudé Local Municipality, with its head offices in Graaff-Reinet. This merger resulted in there being seven local municipalities within the Sarah Baartman District.

== Demographics ==
The following statistics are from the 2001 census.

Language	Population	%
Xhosa	190,003	48.94%
Afrikaans	174,917	45.06%
English	20 806	5.36%
Sotho	744	0.19%
Zulu	596	0.15%
Other	451	0.12%
Ndebele	192	0.05%
Swati	172	0.04%
Tswana	127	0.03%
Northern Sotho	87	0.02%
Tsonga	80	0.02%
Venda	46	0.01%

=== Gender ===
Gender	Population	%
Female	202,295	52.11%
Male	185,906	47.89%

=== Ethnic group ===
Ethnic group	Population	%
Black African	202,289	52.11%
Coloured	141,083	36.34%
White	44 110	11.36%
Indian/Asian	719	0.19%

=== Age ===
Age	Population	%
0–4	33 178	8.55%
5–9	36 745	9.47%
10–14	40 809	10.51%
15–19	41 052	10.57%
20–24	33 222	8.56%
25–29	32 096	8.27%
30–34	29 929	7.71%
35–39	27 840	7.17%
40–44	24 208	6.24%
45–49	20 483	5.28%
50–54	16 494	4.25%
55–59	13 289	3.42%
60-64	12 928	3.33%
65–69	9 218	2.37%
70–74	6 764	1.74%
75–79	4 447	1.15%
80–84	3 276	0.84%
85–89	1 325	0.34%
90–94	680	0.18%
95–99	154	0.04%
100 plus	64	0.02%

== Politics ==
=== Election results ===
Election results for Cacadu in the South African general election, 2004.

- Population 18 and over: 252,570 [65.06% of total population]
- Total votes: 161,399 [41.58% of total population]
- Voting % estimate: 63.90% votes as a % of population 18 and over

Party	Votes	%
African National Congress	116,320	72.07%
Democratic Alliance	27 615	17.11%
Independent Democrats	3 768	2.33%
New National Party	3 694	2.29%
African Christian Democratic Party	2 755	1.71%
United Democratic Movement	2 416	1.50%
Freedom Front Plus	1 687	1.05%
Pan African Congress	999	0.62%
Azanian People's Organisation	492	0.30%
Inkhata Freedom Party	277	0.17%
United Christian Democratic Party	222	0.14%
NA	201	0.12%
Socialist Party of Azania	168	0.10%
EMSA	160	0.10%
Christian Democratic Party	144	0.09%
Peace and Justice Congress	113	0.07%
UF	99	0.06%
TOP	82	0.05%
Keep It Straight and Simple Party	75	0.05%
New Labour Party	69	0.04%
Minority Front	43	0.03%
Total	161,399	100.00%
