= Kurland, South Africa =

Kurland
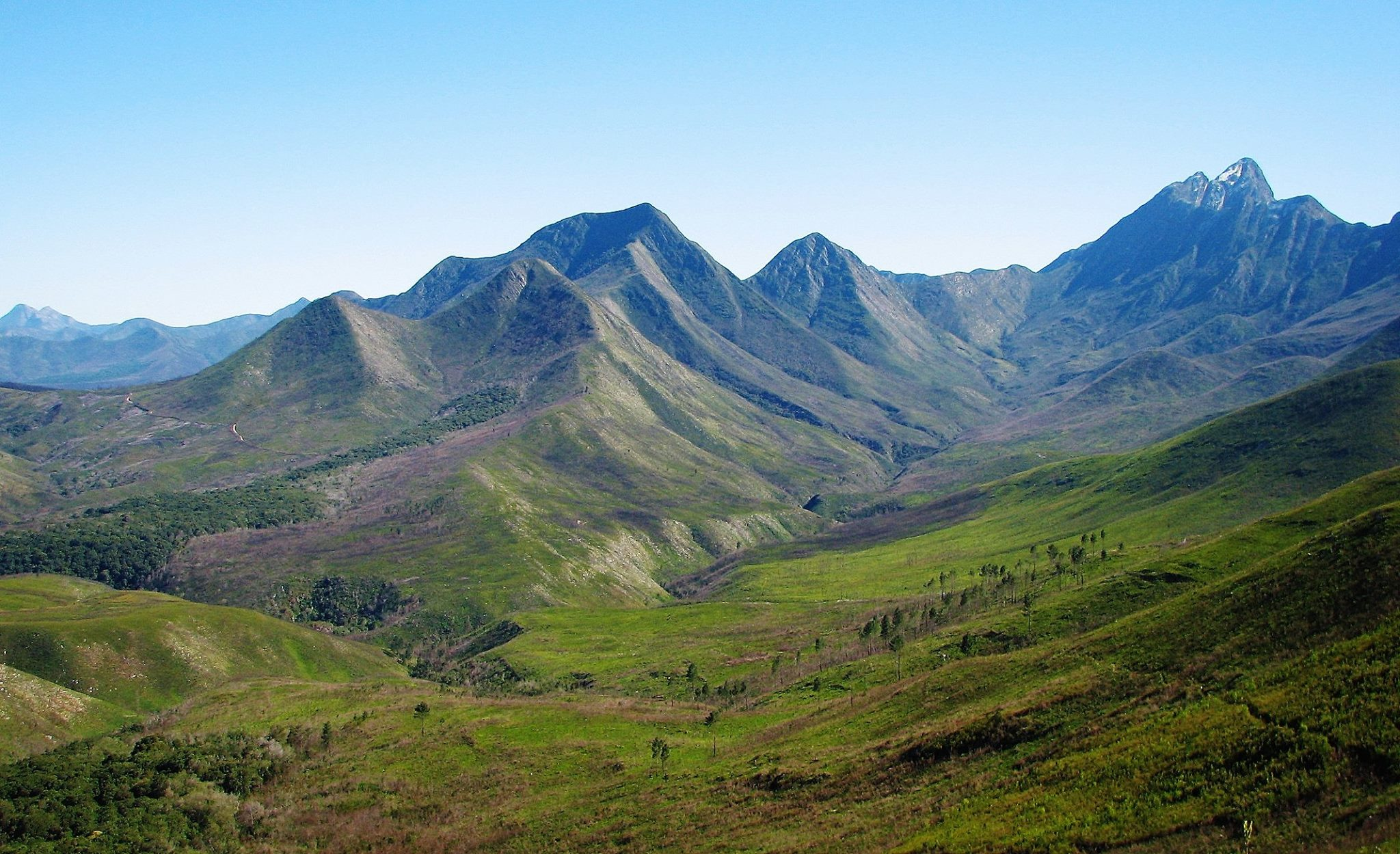
- Formosa Peak near Kurland

- Location within Western Cape Location within South Africa
- Coordinates: 33°56′45″S 23°29′39″E
- Country: South Africa
- Province: Western Cape
- District: Garden Route
- Municipality: Bitou

Area
  - Total: 1.24 km^{2} (0.48 sq mi)

Population (2011)
  - Total: 4,033
  - Density: 3,250/km^{2} (8,420/sq mi)

Racial makeup (2011)
  - Black African: 31.2%
  - Coloured: 58.1%
  - Indian/Asian: 0.2%
  - White: 0.1%
  - Other: 10.3%

First languages (2011)
  - Afrikaans: 70.0%
  - Xhosa: 25.1%
  - English: 1.7%
  - Other: 3.2%
- Time zone: UTC+2 (SAST)

Kurland (often referred to as Kurland Village) is a rural township in the Garden Route District Municipality in the Western Cape province of South Africa.

Located in the Crags area on the edge of the Tsitsikamma Nature Reserve, 20 km from Plettenberg Bay, it is affected by high levels of unemployment and domestic violence. Tourist attractions in the area include Birds of Eden, Tenikwa, Monkeyland Primate Sanctuary, and Elephant Sanctuary along with guest houses and B&Bs. The Crags Primary School, built in 1981, is the only school in the village.
