= Monkeyland =

Monkeyland or Monkey Land may refer to:

- Monkeyland Primate Sanctuary, South Africa
- Monkeyland, primate exhibit at the Guadalajara Zoo
- "Monkeyland", track from the album Script of the Bridge by the Chameleons
- Monkey Land, 1990 album by the rock band Omar & the Howlers
