= Kranshoek =

- Location within Western Cape Location within South Africa
- Coordinates: 34°05′28″S 23°18′23″E
- Country: South Africa
- Province: Western Cape
- District: Garden Route
- Municipality: Bitou

Area
  - Total: 12.33 km^{2} (4.76 sq mi)
- Elevation: 9 m (30 ft)

Population (2011)
  - Total: 5,597
  - Density: 453.9/km^{2} (1,176/sq mi)

Racial makeup (2011)
  - Black African: 9.0%
  - Coloured: 53.4%
  - Indian/Asian: 1.0%
  - White: 0.5%
  - Other: 36.1%

First languages (2011)
  - Afrikaans: 87.9%
  - Xhosa: 4.1%
  - English: 3.9%
  - Tswana: 1.0%
  - Other: 3.1%
- Time zone: UTC+2 (SAST)
- PO box: 6605

Kranshoek is a settlement in Garden Route District Municipality in the Western Cape province of South Africa.

Kranshoek was founded in the early years of the 20th century by a group of Griqua trekkers under the leadership of Abraham le Fleur who had been displaced from their land in Kokstad. Le Fleur also founded the Griqua National Conference in 1904 and the Griqua Independent Church. A local monument, erected in 1942, celebrates the early Griqua pioneers.
