= Keurboomstrand =

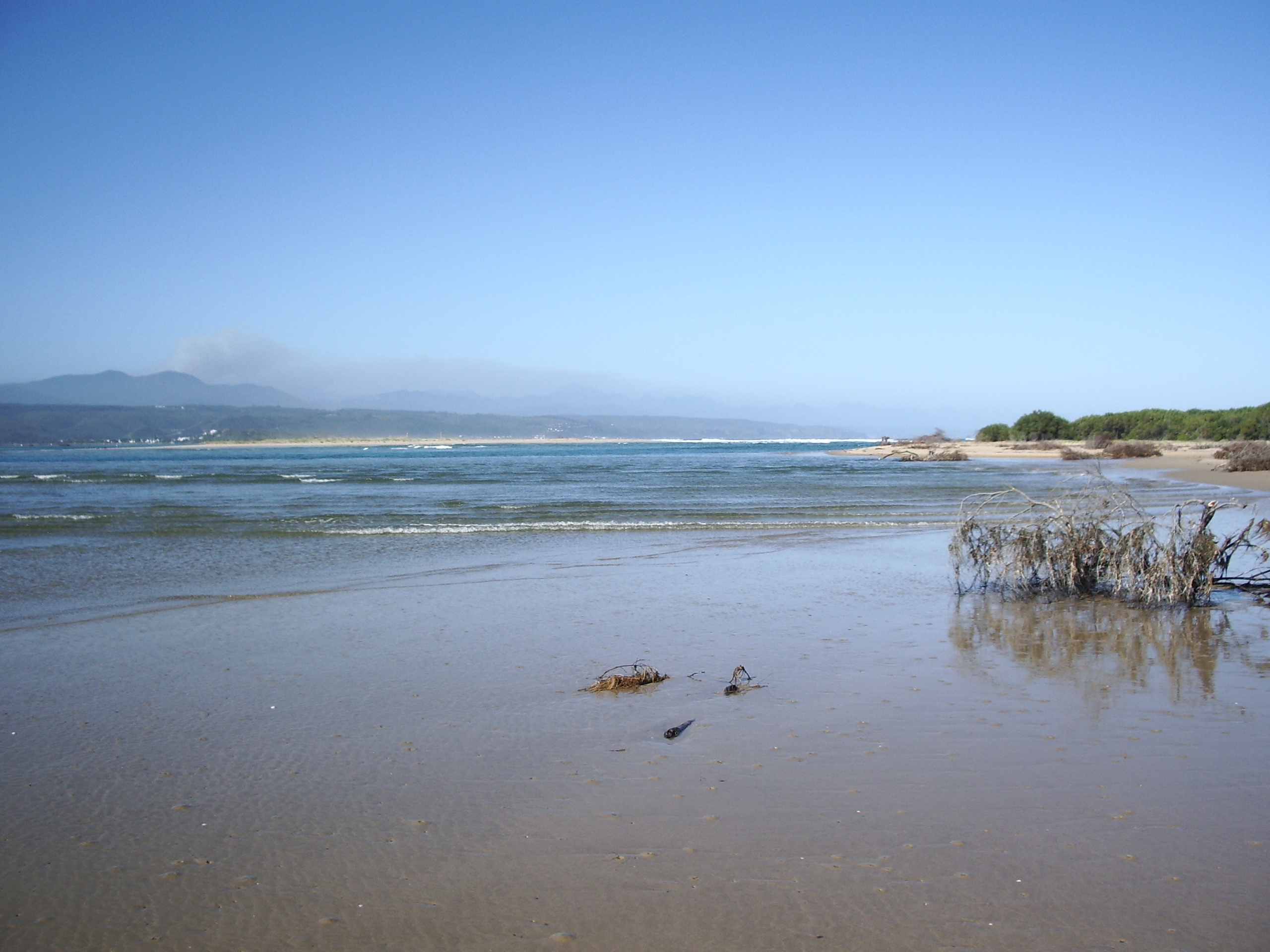
- The Keurbooms rivermouth

- Location within Western Cape Location within South Africa
- Coordinates: 34°00′S 23°27′E
- Country: South Africa
- Province: Western Cape
- District: Garden Route
- Municipality: Bitou

Area
  - Total: 9.75 km^{2} (3.76 sq mi)

Population (2011)
  - Total: 475
  - Density: 48.7/km^{2} (126/sq mi)

Racial makeup (2011)
  - Black African: 2.3%
  - Coloured: 13.5%
  - White: 82.9%
  - Other: 1.3%

First languages (2011)
  - Afrikaans: 49.9%
  - English: 48.6%
  - Other: 1.5%
- Time zone: UTC+2 (SAST)

Keurboomstrand is a resort town near Plettenberg Bay on the Western Cape of South Africa. It takes its name from the indigenous keurboom tree which grows in the region. The Keurbooms River runs nearby.

== History ==
The Matjes River Rock Shelter nearby contains artefacts from the San dating back to the Neolithic period 11,000 years ago and is a National Monument. The shell middens at the site is one of the largest in the world being 10 metres high, 15 metres wide and 30 metres long, but have been degraded.

Portuguese explorers from the Sao Gonçalo were ship-wrecked nearby in 1630 for eight months which was the first European settlement in South Africa.

== See also ==
- Plettenberg Bay
- Klasies River Caves
