= Wittedrif =

- Location within Western Cape Location within South Africa
- Coordinates: 34°00′26″S 23°20′18″E
- Country: South Africa
- Province: Western Cape
- District: Garden Route
- Municipality: Bitou

Area
  - Total: 1.60 km^{2} (0.62 sq mi)

Population (2011)
  - Total: 1,822
  - Density: 1,140/km^{2} (2,950/sq mi)

Racial makeup (2011)
  - Black African: 21.5%
  - Coloured: 61.8%
  - Indian/Asian: 0.9%
  - White: 15.4%
  - Other: 0.5%

First languages (2011)
  - Afrikaans: 84.3%
  - English: 8.8%
  - Xhosa: 5.0%
  - Other: 1.9%
- Time zone: UTC+2 (SAST)
- Postal code (street): 6603
- PO box: 6603

Wittedrif is a settlement in Garden Route District Municipality in the Western Cape province of South Africa.

Wittedrif is a semi-rural village 5.5 km from the N2 road and 30km from Knysna.
