= Bitou Local Municipality =

Bitou Plett
- Local municipality
- Seal

- Location of Bitou Local Municipality within the Western Cape
- Coordinates: 33°55′S 23°25′E
- Country: South Africa
- Province: Western Cape
- District: Garden Route
- Seat: Plettenberg Bay
- Wards: 7

Government
  - Type: Municipal council

Area
  - Total: 992 km^{2} (383 sq mi)

Population (2022)
  - Total: 65,240
  - Density: 65.8/km^{2} (170/sq mi)

Racial makeup (2022)
  - Black African: 52.6%
  - Coloured: 28.8%
  - Indian/Asian: 0.3%
  - White: 16.5%

First languages (2011)
  - Afrikaans: 43.4%
  - Xhosa: 38.0%
  - English: 13.3%
  - Other: 5.3%
- Time zone: UTC+2 (SAST)
- Municipal code: WC047
- Website: www.bitou.gov.za

Bitou Municipality (Afrikaans: Bitou Munisipaliteit; Xhosa: uMasipala wase Bitou), formerly known as Plettenberg Bay Municipality, is a local municipality within the Garden Route District Municipality, in the Western Cape province of South Africa. Its municipality code is WC047.

== Geography ==
The municipality covers an area of 992 square kilometres (383 sq mi) between the Indian Ocean and the Tsitsikamma Mountains around the town of Plettenberg Bay. It is the easternmost municipality on the coast of the Western Cape, with its eastern edge at the Bloukrans River forming the border with the Eastern Cape. It abuts on the Knysna Municipality to the west, the George Municipality to the northwest, and the Kou-Kamma Municipality to the east.

== Demographics ==
The 2022 South African census reported a population of 65,240 in the municipality, increasing at an annual rate of 2.8% since 2011. 52.6% of this population identified as "Black African," 28.8% as "Coloured," and 16.5% as "White."

According to the 2011 census the municipality had a population of 49,162 people in 16,645 households. Of this population, 45.2% describe themselves as "Black African", 31.2% as "Coloured", and 16.9% as "White". The first language of 43.4% of the population is Afrikaans, while 38.0% speak Xhosa and 13.3% speak English.

A majority of residents of the municipality live in the town of Plettenberg Bay, which in 2011 had a population of 31,804. On the other side of the Keurbooms River mouth from Plettenberg Bay is the coastal resort of Keurboomstrand (pop. 475), while the resort of Nature's Valley (pop. 460) is situated further east at the mouth of the Groot River. The Griqua settlement of Kranshoek (pop. 5,597) is situated west of Plettenberg Bay. In the interior of the municipality are villages at Kurland (pop. 4,033) and Wittedrif (pop. 1,822).

== History ==
At the end of the apartheid era, the area that is today the Bitou Municipality formed part of the South Cape Regional Services Council (RSC). The town of Plettenberg Bay was governed by a municipal council elected by the white residents while the coloured residents of New Horizons were governed by a management committee subordinate to the white council. The village of Kurland was also governed by a management committee, while the Griqua settlement at Kranshoek was governed by a board of management. The villages of Wittedrif, Keurboomstrand and Nature's Valley were governed by local councils.

After the national elections of 1994 a process of local government transformation began, in which negotiations were held between the existing local authorities, political parties, and local community organisations. As a result of these negotiations, the existing local authorities were dissolved and the Greater Plettenberg Bay Transitional Local Council (TLC) was established to replace all of them in December 1994.

The TLC was initially made up of members nominated by the various parties to the negotiations, until May 1996 when elections were held. At the time of these elections the South Cape District Council was established in place of the South Cape RSC, and transitional representative councils (TRCs) were elected to represent rural areas outside the TLCs on the District Council. The area that was to become Bitou Municipality included a part of the Outeniqua TRC.

At the local elections of December 2000 the TLCs and TRCs were dissolved and the Plettenberg Bay Municipality was established as a single local authority. At the same election the South Cape District Council was dissolved and replaced by the Eden District Municipality. In 2003 the Plettenberg Bay Municipality was renamed the Bitou Municipality.

== Politics ==
The municipal council consists of thirteen members elected by mixed-member proportional representation. Seven councillors are elected by first-past-the-post voting in seven wards, while the remaining six are chosen from party lists so that the total number of party representatives is proportional to the number of votes received. In the election of 18 May 2011 no party obtained a majority; the Democratic Alliance (DA) and the African National Congress (ANC) won six seats each, with the remaining seat going to the Congress of the People (COPE). The DA and COPE formed a coalition to govern the municipality.

The DA won a ward from the ANC in a by-election held in 2014, and governed Bitou alone with an outright majority of seats on the council.

A hung council was elected following the 2016 municipal elections, with the DA and ANC each winning six seats, and the final seat going to the Active United Front (AUF). The AUF chose to join forces with the ANC. However, six months later, in April 2017, the AUF announced that the partnership had fallen apart because the ANC had frustrated attempts to establish clean administration, had failed to commit resources to address problems, had not implemented the coalition agreement, and had not signed the agreed-upon service delivery plan. The DA and AUF negotiated for a month, following which the DA gained control of the municipality. The relationship between the DA and AUF quickly sourced and the AUF was back with the ANC a year later. In April 2021, AUF mayor Peter Lobese was ousted in a motion of no confidence and deputy mayor Sandiso Gcabayi of the ANC became acting mayor. DA Caucus Leader Bill Nel was elected mayor in May 2021, toppling the ANC-led coalition. The ANC then challenged the election of Bill Nel and the Western Cape High Court declared his election null and void and declared that a new mayor should be elected on 8 June. However, on 8 June, this did not happen. ANC speaker Euan Wildeman suspended Lobese, which made ineligible to cast a vote for mayor, leading to a split vote between the DA's Nel and the ANC's Gcabayi. The DA then approached the High Court, requesting that Lobese's suspension be declared unlawful. the High Court sided with the DA and declared Lobese's unlawful, which made it null and void. The High Court also ordered the speaker to convene a council meeting for 9 July. The meeting was then delayed as the ANC councillors appealed the High Court's decision. On 10 September, the High Court overturned its initial decision to declare the suspension of Lobese's council membership unlawful.

In the November 2021 local government elections, a hung council was once again elected. The DA won five out of the thirteen seats, the ANC won four, the Ikhwezi Political Movement (IPM), the Patriotic Alliance (PA), the PDC and the Active United Front (AUF) all won one seat. The DA then formed a coalition with the PDC and AUF to govern the municipality with the DA mayoral candidate, Dave Swart, voted in as mayor.

The following table shows the results of the 2021 election.

Party	Ward			List			Total seats
Party	Votes	%	Seats	Votes	%	Seats	Total seats
Democratic Alliance	7,897	36.03	3	8,345	37.59	2	5
African National Congress	4,374	19.96	3	4,446	20.03	0	3
Active United Front	2,137	9.75	0	2,052	9.24	1	1
Plett Democratic Congress	1,648	7.52	1	1,586	7.14	0	1
Ikhwezi Political Movement	1,360	6.20	0	1,324	5.96	1	1
Patriotic Alliance	1,292	5.89	0	1,299	5.85	1	1
Freedom Front Plus	1,236	5.64	0	1,090	4.91	1	1
12 other parties	1,974	9.01	0	2,060	9.28	0	0
Total	21,918	100.00	7	22,202	100.00	6	13
Valid votes	21,918	99.09		22,202	99.24		
Invalid/blank votes	202	0.91		169	0.76		
Total votes	22,120	100.00		22,371	100.00		
Registered voters/turnout	35,941	61.55		35,941	62.24		
