= Plettenberg Bay =

Plettenberg Bay Plettenbergbaai
- Town
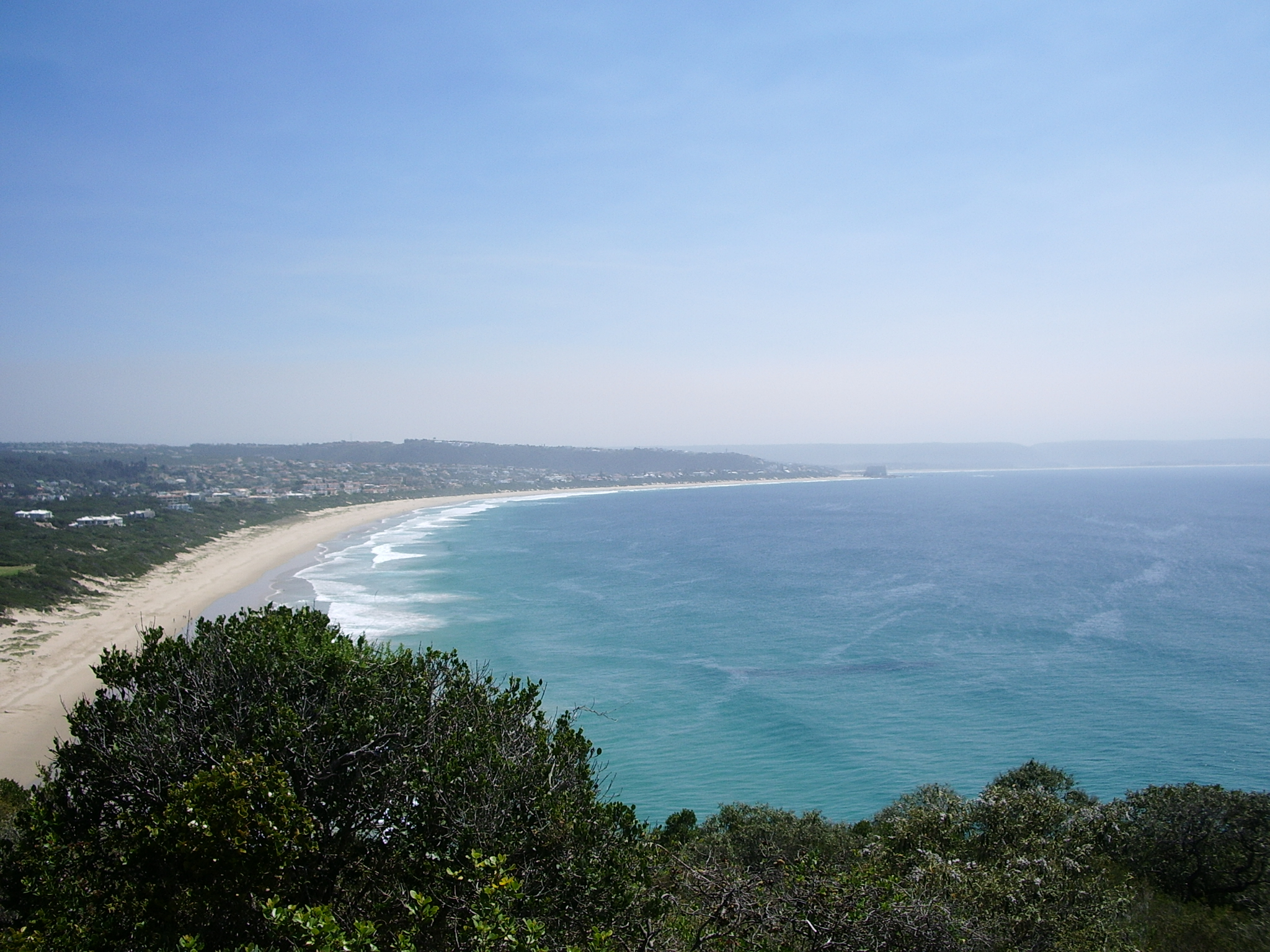
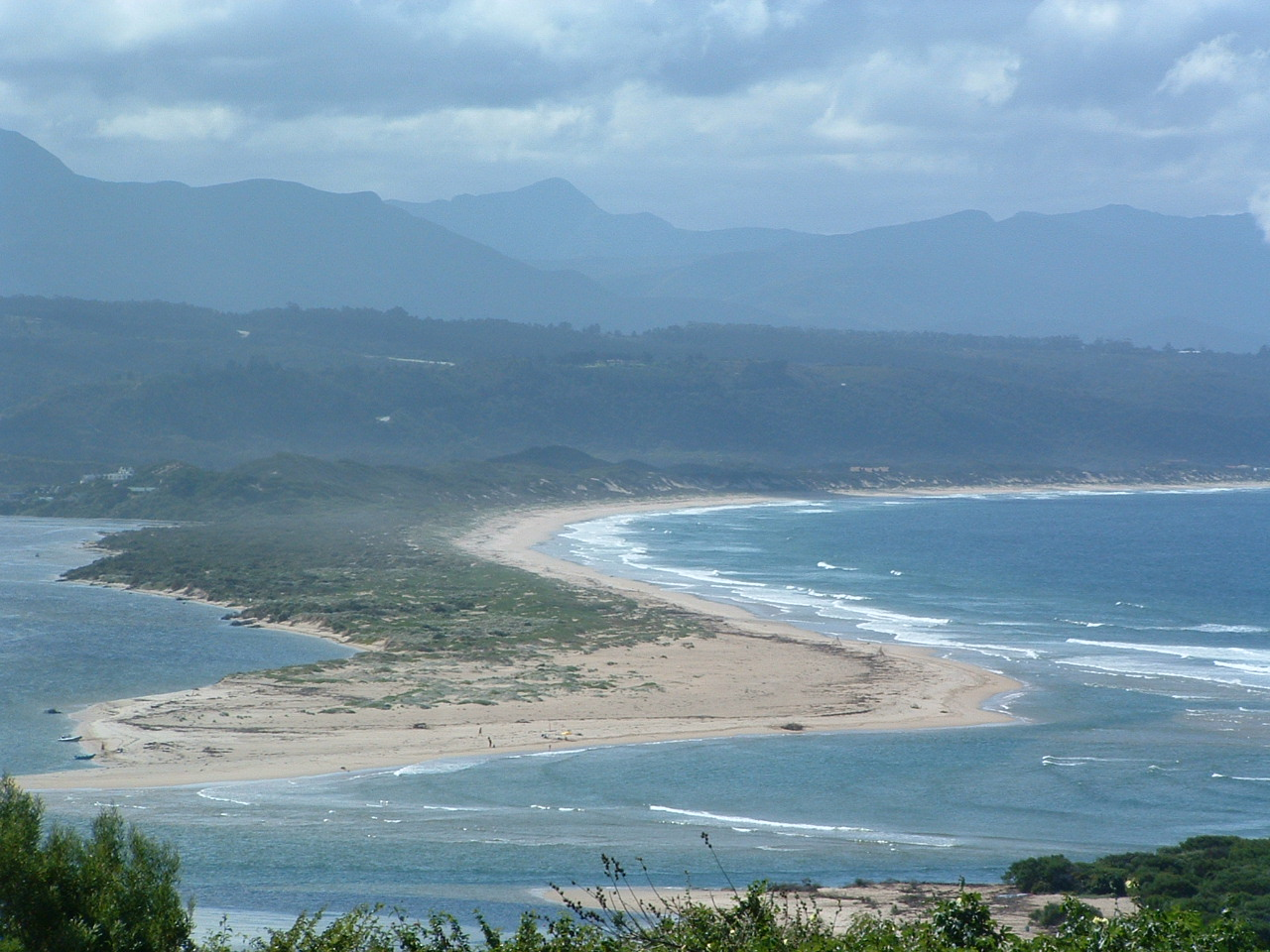
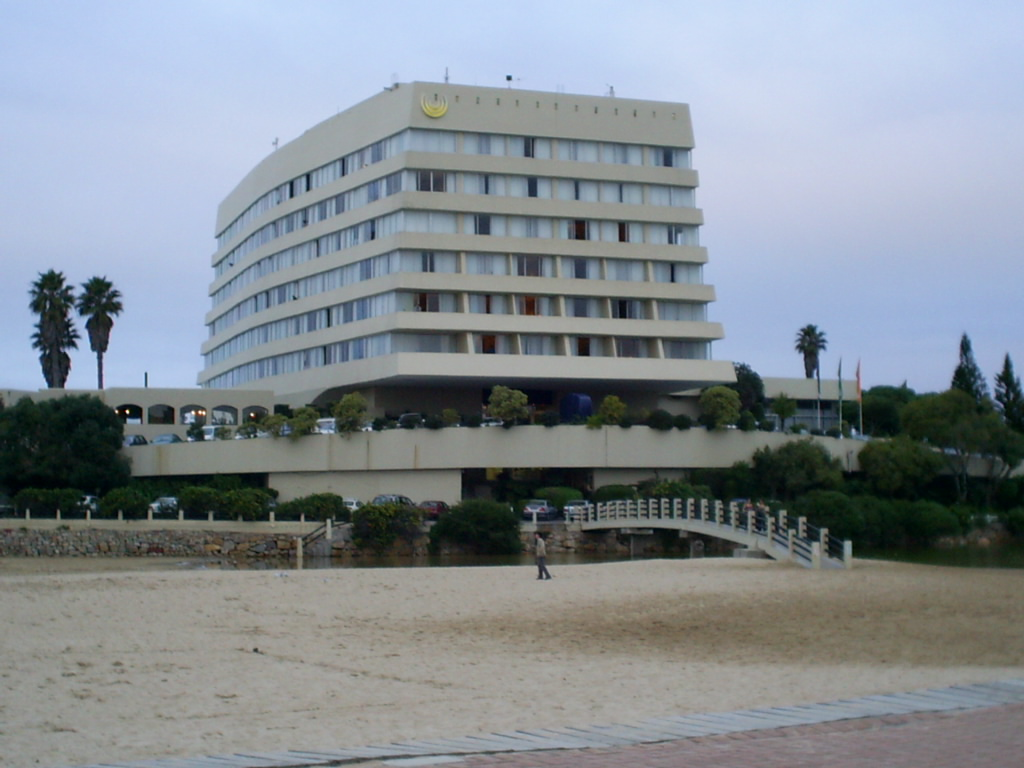
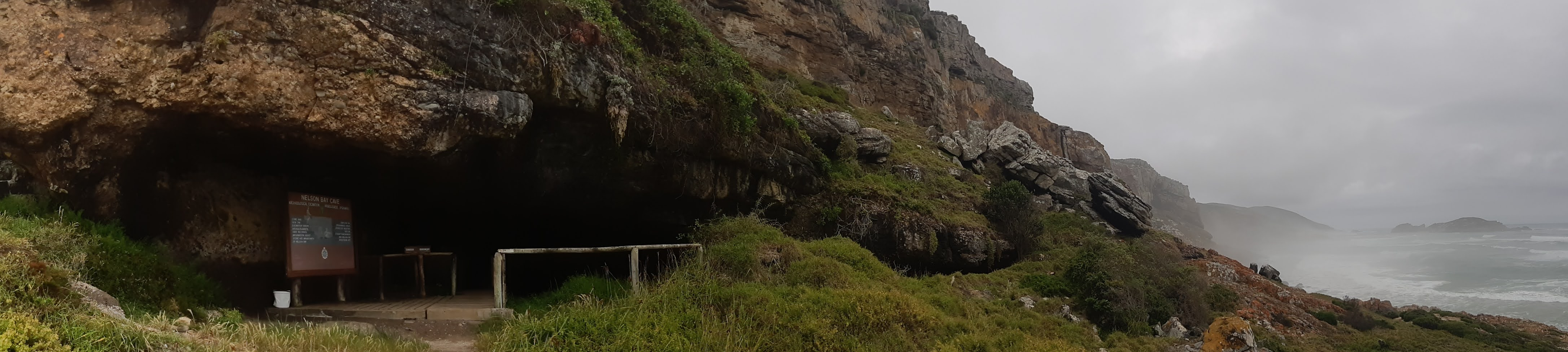
- From top, Plettenberg Bay viewed from Robberg Peninsula. Keurbooms River mouth (middle left). Beacon Island Resort (middle right). Entrance to Nelson Bay Cave stone age archaeological site (bottom).

- Location within Western Cape Location within South Africa Location within Africa
- Coordinates: 34°03′S 23°22′E
- Country: South Africa
- Province: Western Cape
- District: Garden Route
- Municipality: Bitou

Area
  - Total: 39.7 km^{2} (15.3 sq mi)

Population (2024)
  - Total: 64,108
  - Density: 1,610/km^{2} (4,180/sq mi)

Racial makeup (2011)
  - Black African: 60.3%
  - Coloured: 21.6%
  - Indian/Asian: 0.4%
  - White: 16.0%
  - Other: 1.6%

First languages (2011)
  - Xhosa: 53.7%
  - Afrikaans: 27.4%
  - English: 13.0%
  - Other: 5.9%
- Time zone: UTC+2 (SAST)
- Postal code (street): 6600
- PO box: 6600

Plettenberg Bay, nicknamed Plett, is the primary town of the Bitou Local Municipality in the Western Cape Province of South Africa. According to the census of 2001, the town had a population of 29,149. It was originally named Bahia Formosa ("Beautiful Bay") by early Portuguese explorers and lies on South Africa's Garden Route 210 km from Port Elizabeth and about 600 km from Cape Town.

== History ==
=== Middle and Later Stone Age ===
Nelson Bay Cave on Robberg and Matjies River Cave at nearby Keurboomstrand were inhabited for over 100,000 years by Middle Stone Age man and then later by ancestors of the Khoisan, who were possibly the same people who traded with the Portuguese survivors of the Sao Goncalves shipwreck. Their tools, ornaments and food debris can be viewed in these caves, which are still being excavated.

=== Colonial period ===
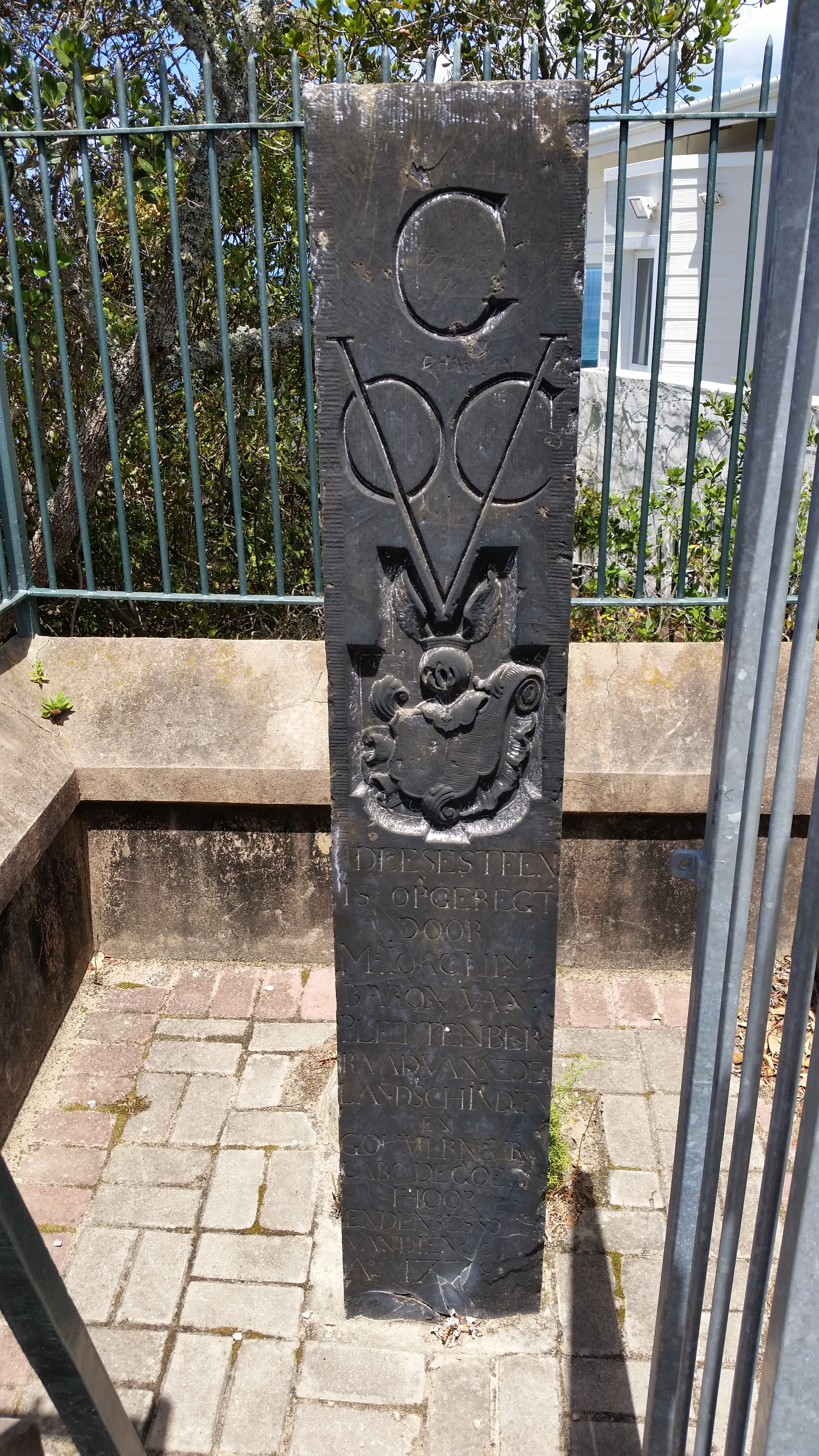
Replica of the possessional stone erected in 1778 by then VOC governor of the Cape, baron Joachim van Plettenberg.

Long before Jan van Riebeeck landed at the Cape, Portuguese explorers charted the bay in the 15th and 16th centuries, the first being Bartolomeu Dias in 1487. Ninety years later Manuel de Perestrelo aptly called it Bahia Formosa or the Beautiful Bay. The first European inhabitants were 100 Portuguese sailors marooned here for 9 months when the São Gonçalo sank in the bay in June 1630. The survivors built two small boats, one which linked with a passing vessel while the other made it to Mozambique. A stone that they left behind on Beacon Island, known as the Van Plettenberg Stone, is now in the Cape Town museum. In 1763, the first European settlers in the Bay were stock farmers, hunters and frontiersmen from the Western Cape.

A stinkwood navigational beacon was first erected on Beacon Island in 1771. The original was a square block of stinkwood, inscribed with the latitude and longitude of Plettenberg Bay and erected to enable mariners to check their location. It was replaced by a stone one by Captain Sewell in 1881.

The bay housed a barracks for the Dutch East India Company in 1776. The Governor of the Cape, Baron Joachim van Plettenberg, renamed the town Plettenberg Bay in 1779. In 1869 the barracks was bought by St Peter's Church and used as a rectory for the next 70 years. Today it is the privately owned Old Rectory hotel & spa.

In 1787/88 Johann Jerling erected a timber shed commissioned by the Dutch East India Company; the remains can still be seen and are preserved as a provincial heritage site.

In the 1830s, Plettenberg Bay was a stopping point for ships travelling through during the winter time, heading to India.[6]

As of 1833, the population of Plettenberg Bay was estimated around 400, with half being white, according to diplomat Edmund Roberts who visited the area. Edmund Roberts noted that the bay had a large abundance of cattle and sheep. He also recognized "the excellence of its butter" and a timber industry.

=== Modern period ===
A whaling station on Beacon Island closed down in 1916. Parts of the iron slipway are still visible today. A hotel called The Beacon Isle was built on the site of the whaling station. This was replaced by the iconic Beacon Isle Southern Sun Resort which opened for business in December 1972. This building, designed by André Hoffe, has a layered atrium which pays tribute to the Guggenheim Museum of Frank Lloyd Wright.

Between 1960 and 1990 Plettenberg Bay holiday resort expanded dramatically, extending along Robberg Beach ('Millionaire's Row'), and back towards the N2. During the apartheid period property within Plettenberg Bay was designated for whites only, with segregation of the beaches and toilet facilities. New Horizons, across the N2, was designated as a settlement area for coloured people in 1968. As the 1980s progressed informal settlements of Xhosa people grew up around the edges of New Horizons and in the area of KwaNokuthula which became a town.

Although Plettenberg Bay escaped most of the violence associated with the end of apartheid, the assassination of Chris Hani in April 1993 led to a protest march into the town from KwaNokuthula, during which industrial premises on the outskirts of the town were burnt to the ground. Formal segregation ceased with the repeal of the apartheid laws, but the consequences of the previously segregated property ownership remain highly visible to this day.

== Ecology ==
=== Land ecology ===
Local vegetation varies from Cape Fynbos to Knysna-Amatole montane forests further inland. The best examples of the original indigenous forest are to be found in the gully of the Keurbooms River, home to Knysna Loerie and Fish Eagles. Robberg Peninsula is essentially a Fynbos reserve.

=== Sea ecology ===
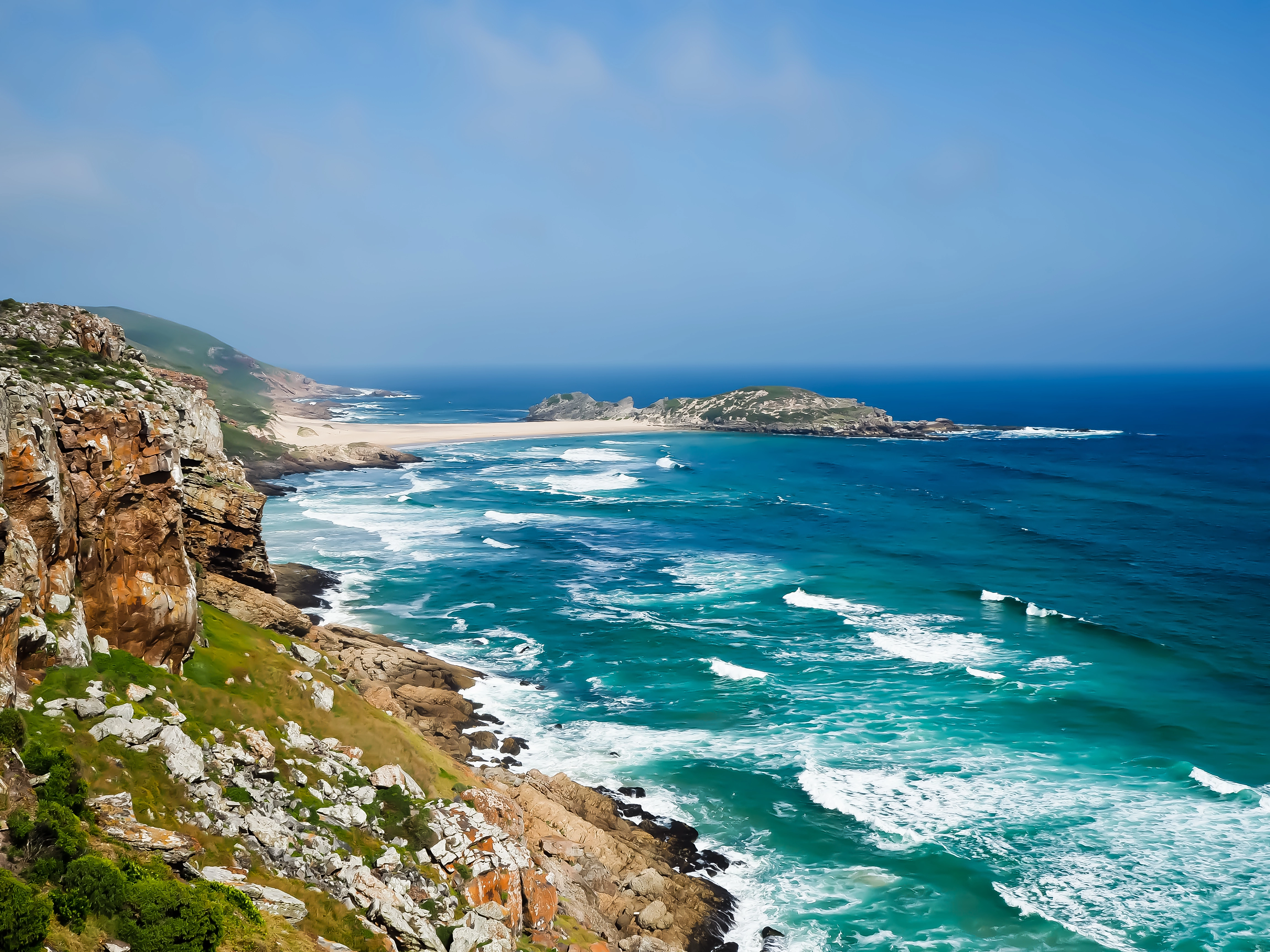
Robberg Peninsula - a home of seals

Plettenberg Bay hosts one of the largest seagull breeding colonies along the South African coast at the mouth of the Keurbooms River, named after the indigenous keurboom tree. There are many pelagic birds in the area as well as the endangered African oystercatcher which live along the shores.

The Keurbooms River estuary is home to the Knysna or Cape Seahorse, Hippocampus Capensis. This is South Africa's only endemic seahorse, and is found only in the estuaries of the Keurbooms, Knysna and Swartvlei rivers. It measures about 12 cm in length, and attaches itself to eel-grass.

The Robberg Peninsula is home to a large Cape fur seal colony, seals can often be seen in the surf off Robberg Beach. Great white sharks, attracted by the seal colony, can also be spotted from the high ground of Robberg Peninsula. In 2024, the BBC programme Planet Earth (franchise) narrated by David Attenborough filmed seals banding together to protect themselves against Great White sharks in Plettenberg Bay. Southern right whales are a common sight in the bay during their breeding season from July to December. Bryde's whales frequent the bay throughout the year being the most sighted during the summer months. Humpback whales migrate past during July and December. Killer whales (orca) and sei whales are occasionally sighted. Whales can be viewed from various viewpoints in the town as well as from Robberg Peninsula. Plettenberg Bay also boasts three species of dolphins which visit the bay throughout the year, these being the bottlenosed dolphin, the common dolphin and the endangered humpback dolphin.

The bay falls within the Agulhas Bank ecoregion (bioregion), specifically within the Agulhas inshore ecozone. There has been a long history of sport fishing from the rocks, ski boats launched from Central Beach, or in Keurbooms estuary. The sea life activity both surface and sub-surface varies considerably as either deep water upwelling brings cold water into the Bay, or warm water eddies over from the Agulhas Indian Ocean current offshore.

A distinctive flower-shaped sea shell called a pansy shell is endemic to this part of the coast, and is used as the symbol representing the town. Looking for these shells on the beach at low tide is a popular activity amongst visitors and locals alike.

== Climate and geography ==
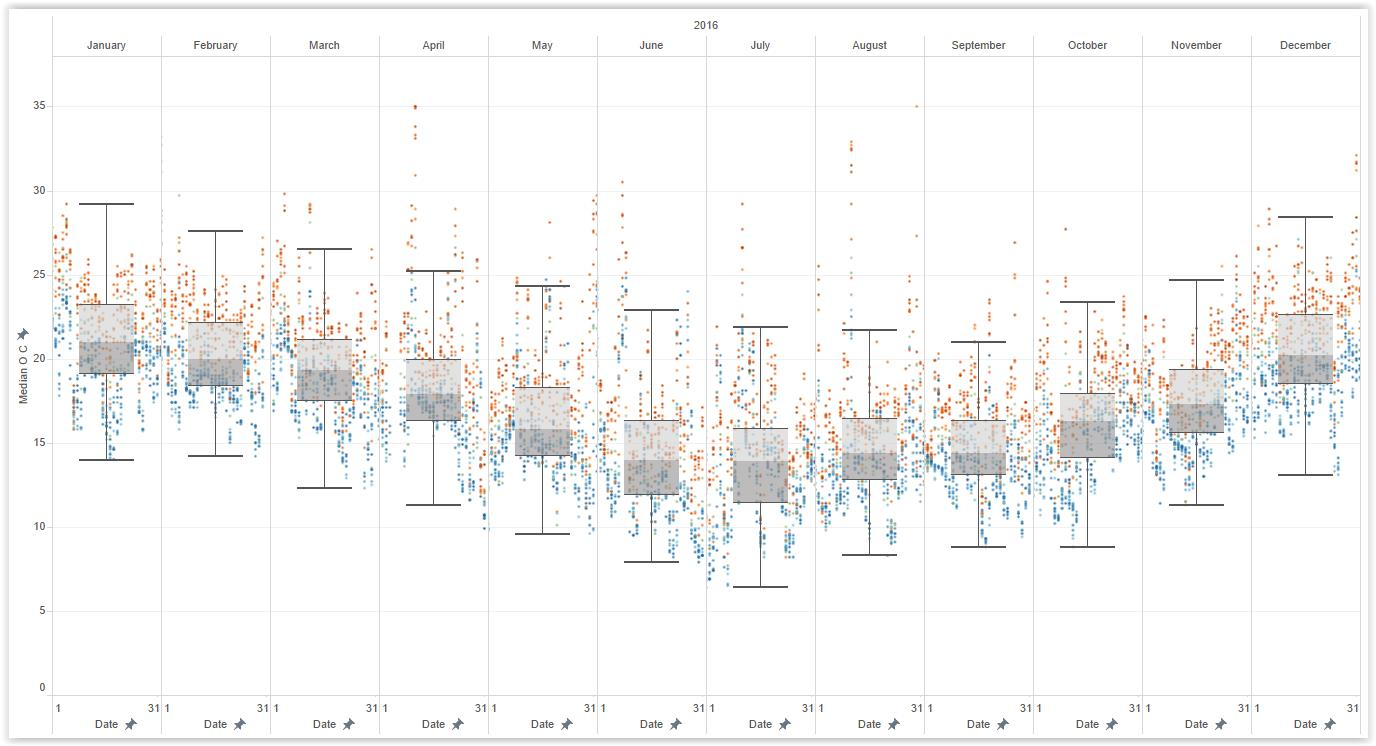
Hourly temperatures (Orange = Day, Blue = Night)

Plettenberg Bay is typified by an extremely mild maritime temperate climate with very few rainfall or temperature extremes. It is located within the Knysna Afromontane Forest biome, containing temperate gallery forest, supported by the mild temperatures and high, evenly distributed rainfall.

- rainfall: 640 mm per annum.

The bay is defined on the southern end by Cape Seal at the terminus of the Robberg (Afrikaans for Seal Mountain) Peninsula, separating the bay from the open Indian Ocean. It is one of the southern cape coast's typical "J-shaped" bays, which is formed by wave action eroding the shales of the Bokkeveld Group between the weather-resistant headlands composed of the Table Mountain Group, both of the Cape Supergroup geological sequence of rocks. To the north, the Tsitsikamma and Langkloof Mountains keeps the moisture on the southern slopes of the mountains and prevent the temperature extremes of the interior reaching the bay.

Climate data for Plettenberg Bay
Month	Jan	Feb	Mar	Apr	May	Jun	Jul	Aug	Sep	Oct	Nov	Dec	Year
Mean daily maximum °C (°F)	24 (75)	24 (75)	23 (73)	21 (70)	19 (66)	18 (64)	18 (64)	18 (64)	18 (64)	20 (68)	21 (70)	22 (72)	21 (69)
Mean daily minimum °C (°F)	18 (64)	18 (64)	18 (64)	16 (61)	14 (57)	12 (54)	12 (54)	12 (54)	13 (55)	14 (57)	15 (59)	17 (63)	15 (59)
Average precipitation mm (inches)	47.2 (1.86)	47.5 (1.87)	52.6 (2.07)	48.2 (1.90)	50.3 (1.98)	65.3 (2.57)	69.8 (2.75)	60.2 (2.37)	54.1 (2.13)	61.6 (2.43)	62.9 (2.48)	47.9 (1.89)	667.6 (26.3)
Average relative humidity (%)	76.8	76.9	76.6	71.9	69.2	64.3	64.7	67.2	71.9	73.9	74.4	76.9	72.1
Average dew point °C (°F)	15.3 (59.5)	15.8 (60.4)	15.1 (59.2)	13.8 (56.8)	11.3 (52.3)	9.1 (48.4)	8.3 (46.9)	8.9 (48.0)	10.5 (50.9)	11.6 (52.9)	13.0 (55.4)	14.2 (57.6)	12.2 (54.0)
Mean daily daylight hours	14.6	13.7	12.7	12.7	10.8	10.4	10.6	11.3	12.3	13.4	14.4	14.9	12.7
Percentage possible sunshine	64.4	63.8	61.1	61.3	60.9	61.5	65	64.5	58.9	59.1	61.6	64.4	62.2
Source: world weather online(2009–2023) Weatherbase(sunhine-dew point-humidity)

== Tourism ==
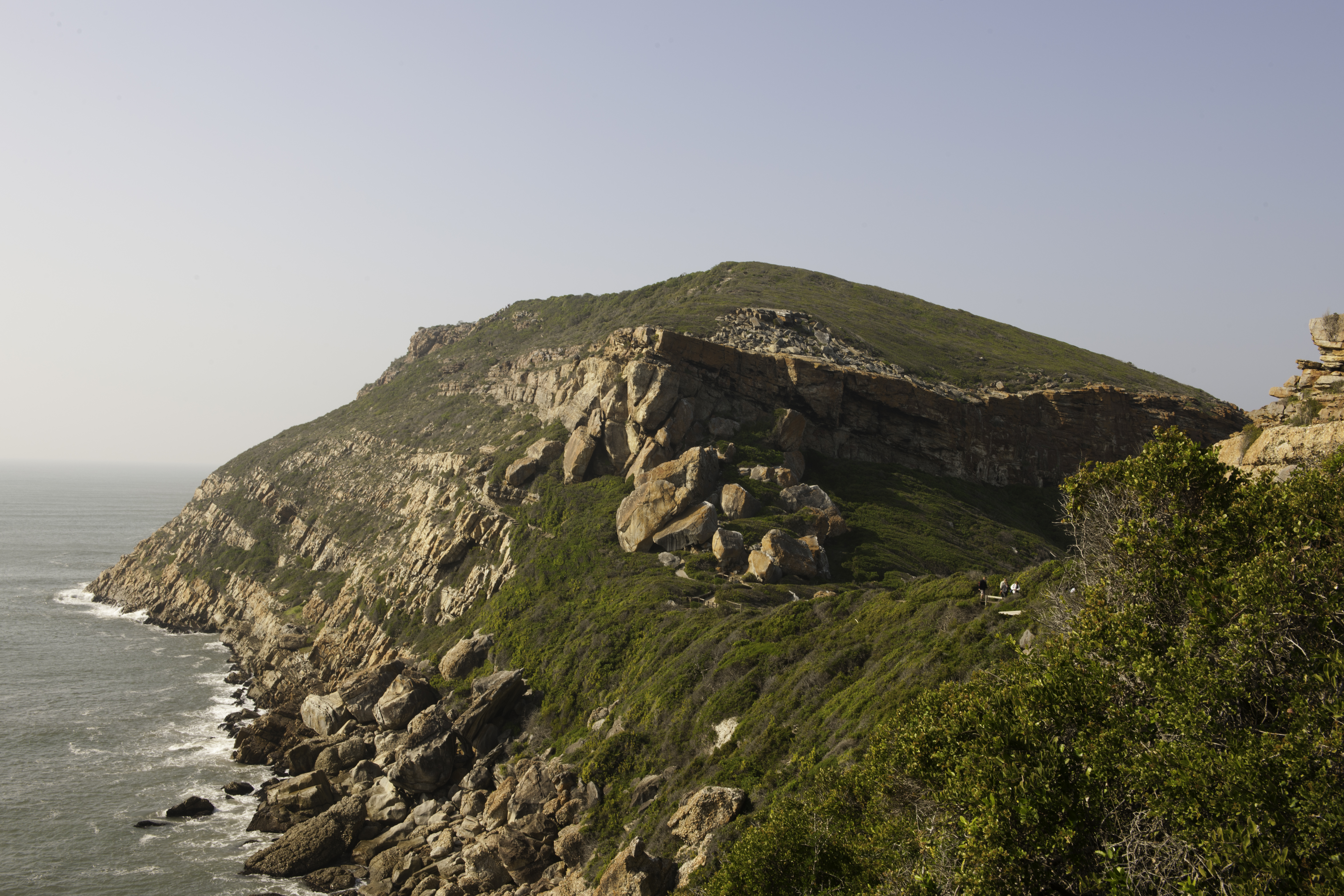
Robberg peninsula

The town is highly seasonal, with a large proportion of second homes used exclusively during peak holiday periods. Popular with domestic and foreign tourists alike, many make it a stop along the garden route to visit local attractions such as Robberg Peninsula Nature Reserve, the world's largest free-flight aviary Birds of Eden, Sea Kayaking and Whale Watching, as a base to start the coastal Otter Trail, Monkeyland Primate Sanctuary or a host of other outdoor activities on offer. Although George and Port Elizabeth Airports are both within 1 and 2.5 hours drive away and offer frequent domestic and select international flights, CemAir also restarted regular direct flights from Plettenberg Bay Aerodrome to Cape Town International Airport and Johannesburg's OR Tambo Airport in 2014, enhancing accessibility by air. The airport is currently closed to commercial flights pending discussions over repairs to the runway.

== Education ==
The following primary and secondary schools are located in Plettenberg Bay.

- Kwa-Nokuthula Primary School
- Formosa Primary School
- Harkerville Ek Primary School
- Kranshoek Primary School
- Phakamisani Primary School
- Crags Primary School
- Plettenberg Bay Primary School
- Plettenberg Bay Secondary School
- Legacy House School
- Murray High School
- Plettenberg Bay Christian School
- Wittedrift Primary School
- Greenwood Bay College
- Wittedrift High School

== Notable people ==
- Athenkosi Dlala, footballer
- Oliver Hermanus, filmmaker
- Geordin Hill-Lewis, DA politician
- Samkelo Mvimbi, hockey player
- Asenathi Ntlabakanye, rugby union player
- Gary Player, golfer
