= Birds of Eden =

Bird sanctuary in Western Cape, South Africa

Birds of Eden Bird Sanctuary
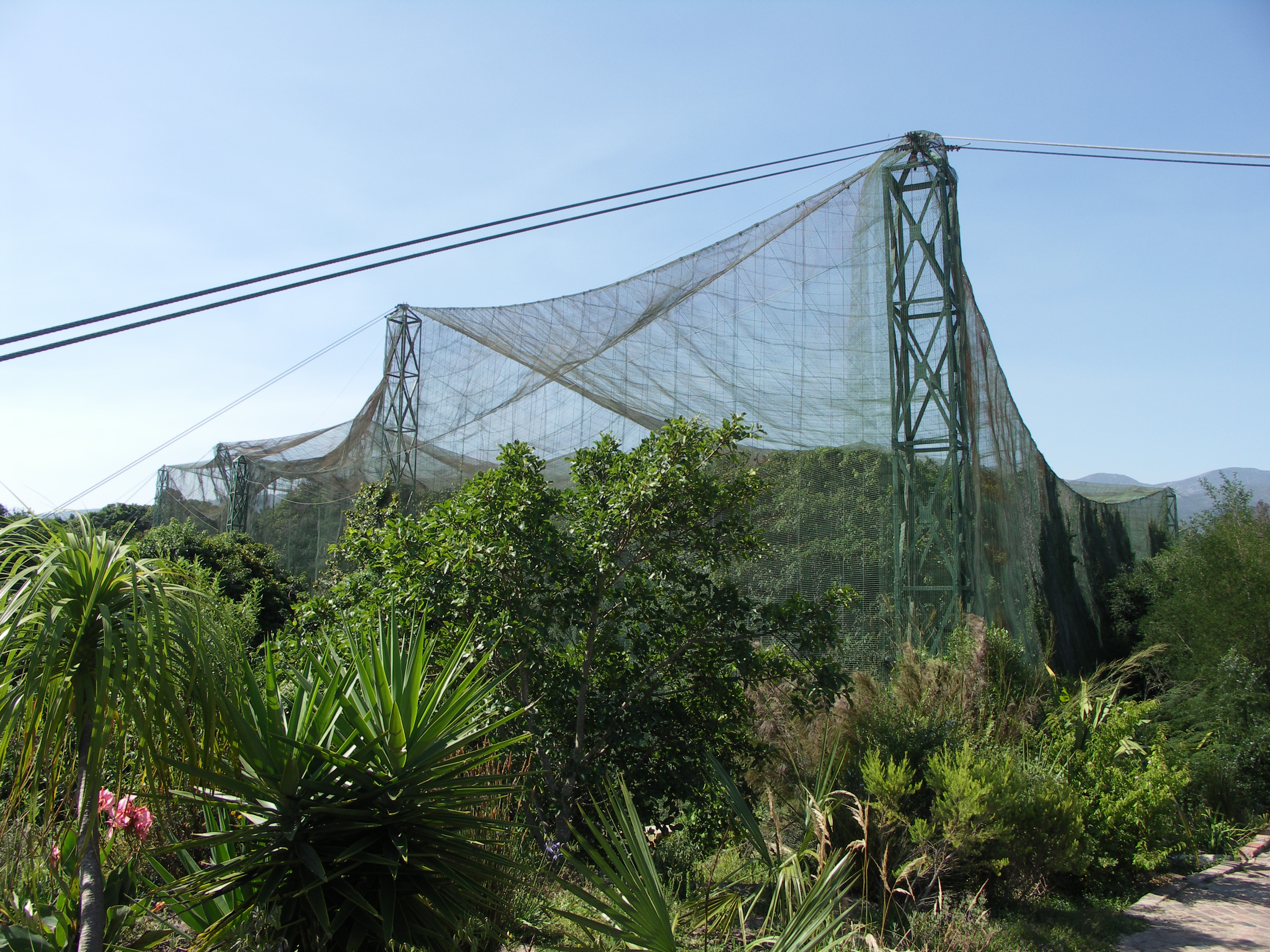
- The aviary
- Interactive map of Birds of Eden Bird Sanctuary
- 33.963°S 23.4835°E
- Date opening: 2005-12-15
- Location: Western Cape, South Africa
- Land area: 2.3 hectares (5.7 acres)
- No. of animals: 3000+
- No. of species: 280+
- Website: www.birdsofeden.co.za

Birds of Eden is a free flight aviary and bird sanctuary, located in Kurland village near Plettenberg Bay in the Western Cape, South Africa. The mesh dome of the sanctuary was built over 2.3 hectares (5.7 acres) of indigenous forest, and is up to 55 metres (180 ft) above ground level. 1.2 kilometres (0.75 mi) of walkways, about 75% of which are elevated, let visitors see the birds at all levels of the aviary.

Birds of Eden is one of the four Sanctuaries under The South African Animal Sanctuary Alliance (SAASA). As a member of SAASA Birds of Eden was honoured with four major tourism awards in 2014. The four awards are namely the Lilizela Tourism Visitor Experience of the Year Award at a 'Wildlife Encounters', the Skål International Sustainable Tourism Award, Overall winner of the World Responsible Tourism Award as well as the Gold Award in World Responsible Tourism in the category of 'Best Animal Welfare Initiative'.

It was the largest free flight aviary in the world from its opening in 2005 until 2026, when it was surpassed by the Deccan Birds Aviary in Hyderabad, India.

== Facilities ==
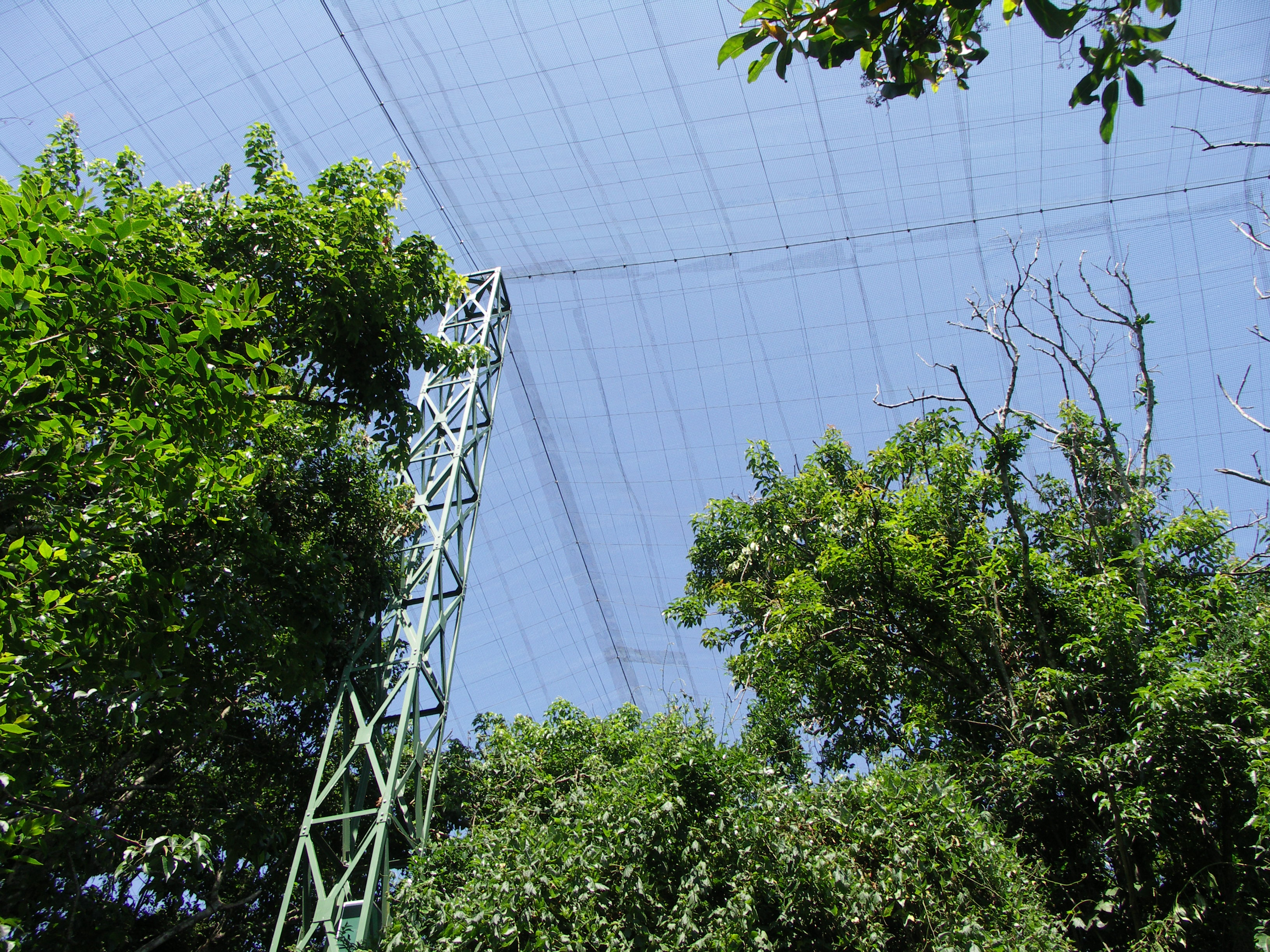
Masts and mesh

The 2.3-hectare (5.7-acre) enclosure is covered 3.2 hectares (7.9 acres) of wire mesh resting on cables strung between 28 masts. The masts vary in length between 2 and 34 metres (6 ft 7 in and 111 ft 7 in) and at its highest point the mesh is 55 metres (180 ft) above the ground. The total weight of the wire mesh is about 80 tonnes, and it encloses a total volume of 375,372 cubic metres (13,256,100 cu ft).

Visitors can access the aviary through about 1.2 kilometres (0.75 mi) of walkways, about 75% of which are elevated to let them see the birds in all areas of the aviary. Visitors can tour the facility on their own, or take a guided tour.

The enclosure was built over indigenous forest and includes a natural gorge with a waterfall, and a 200-seat amphitheater.

== Animals ==
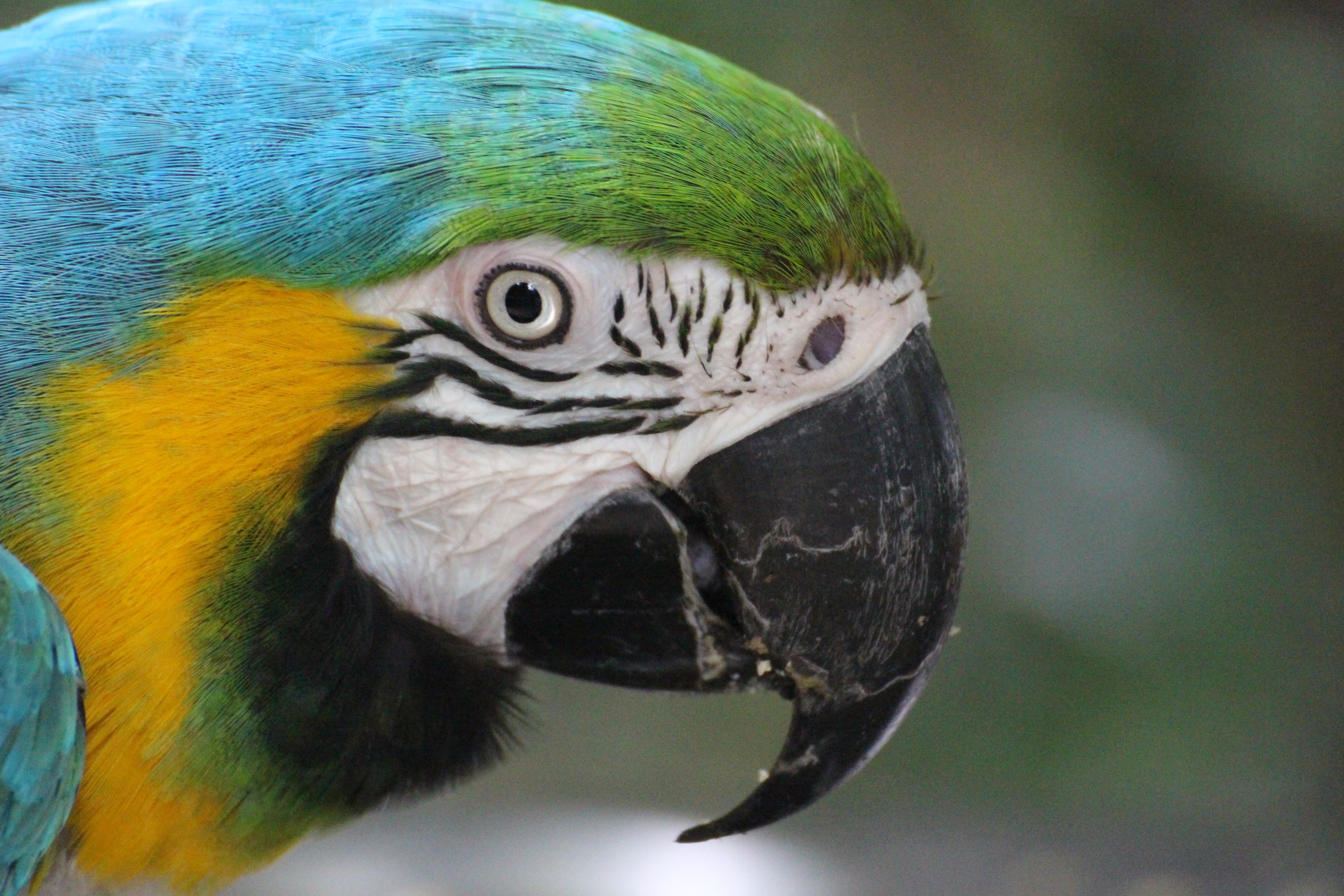
A Blue-and-yellow macaw

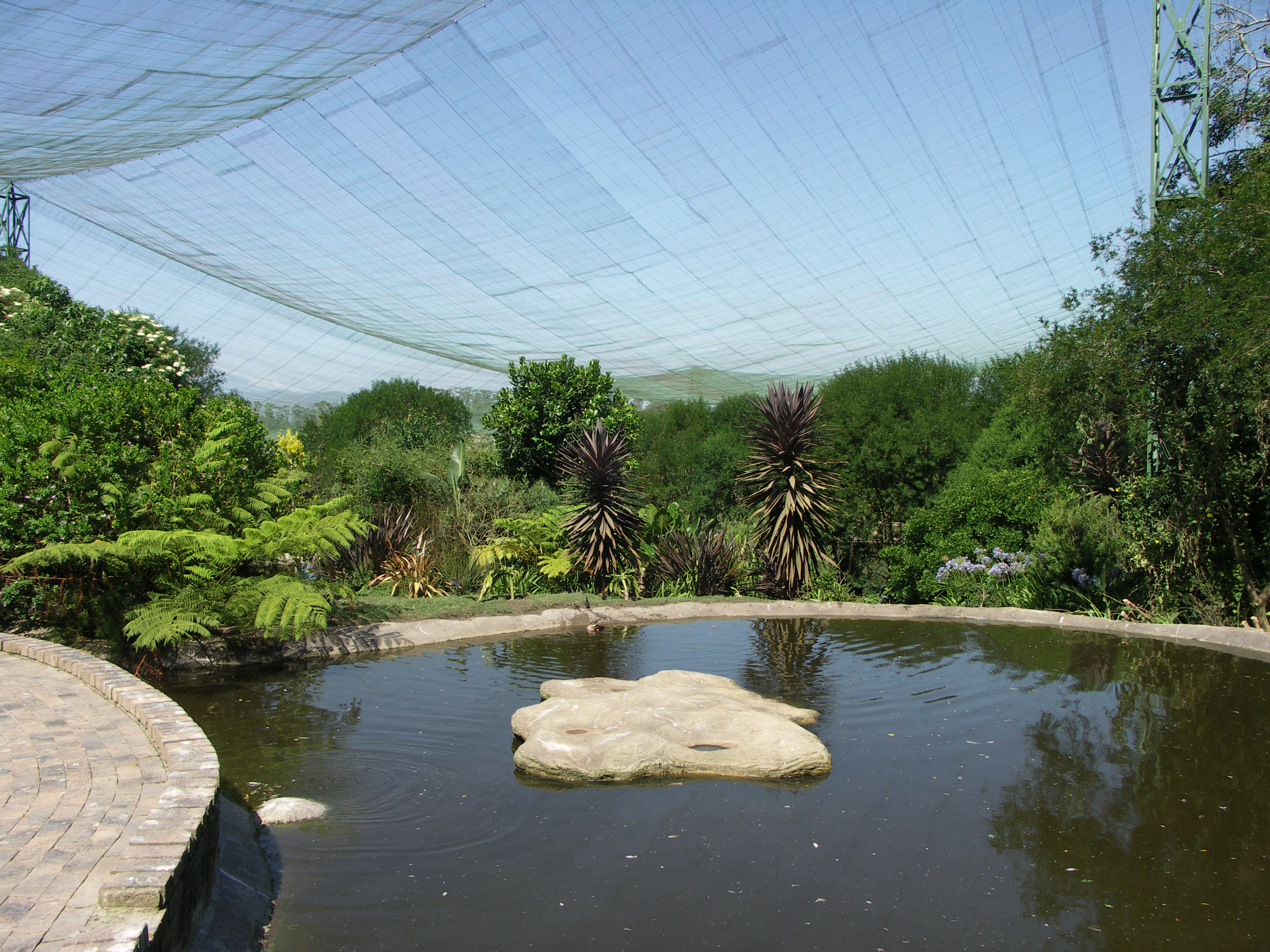
Inside the aviary

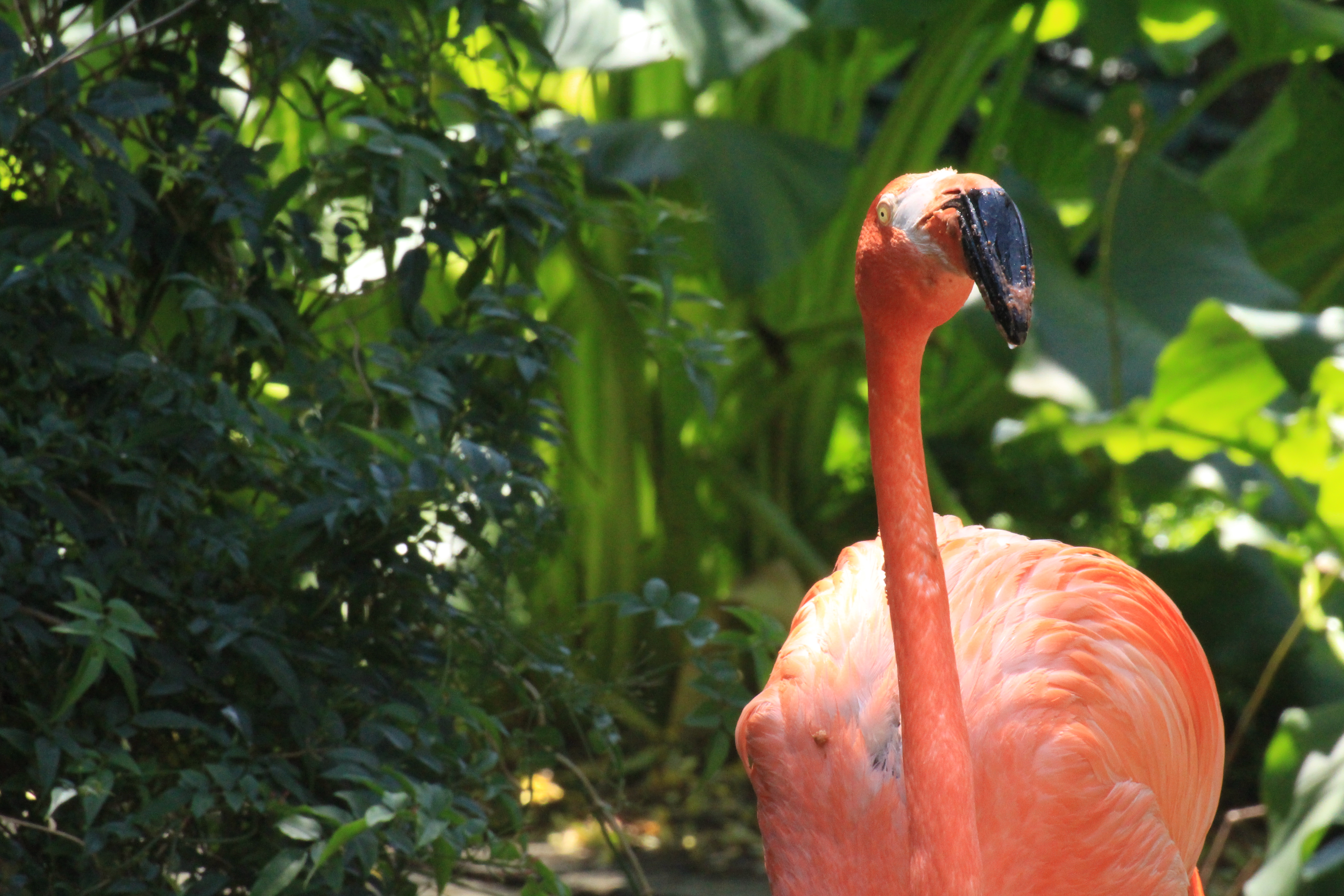
Pink flamingo

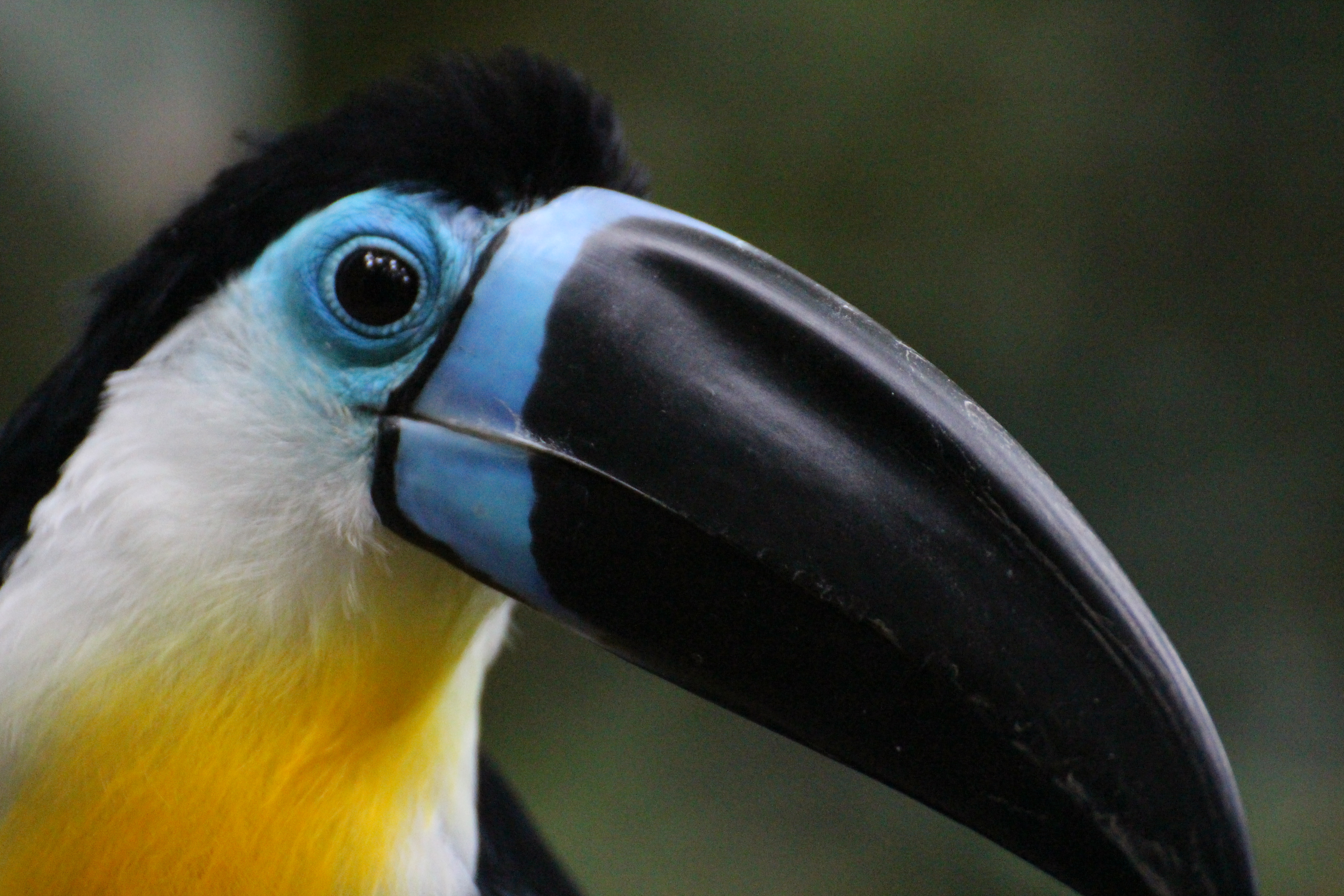
Channel-billed toucan

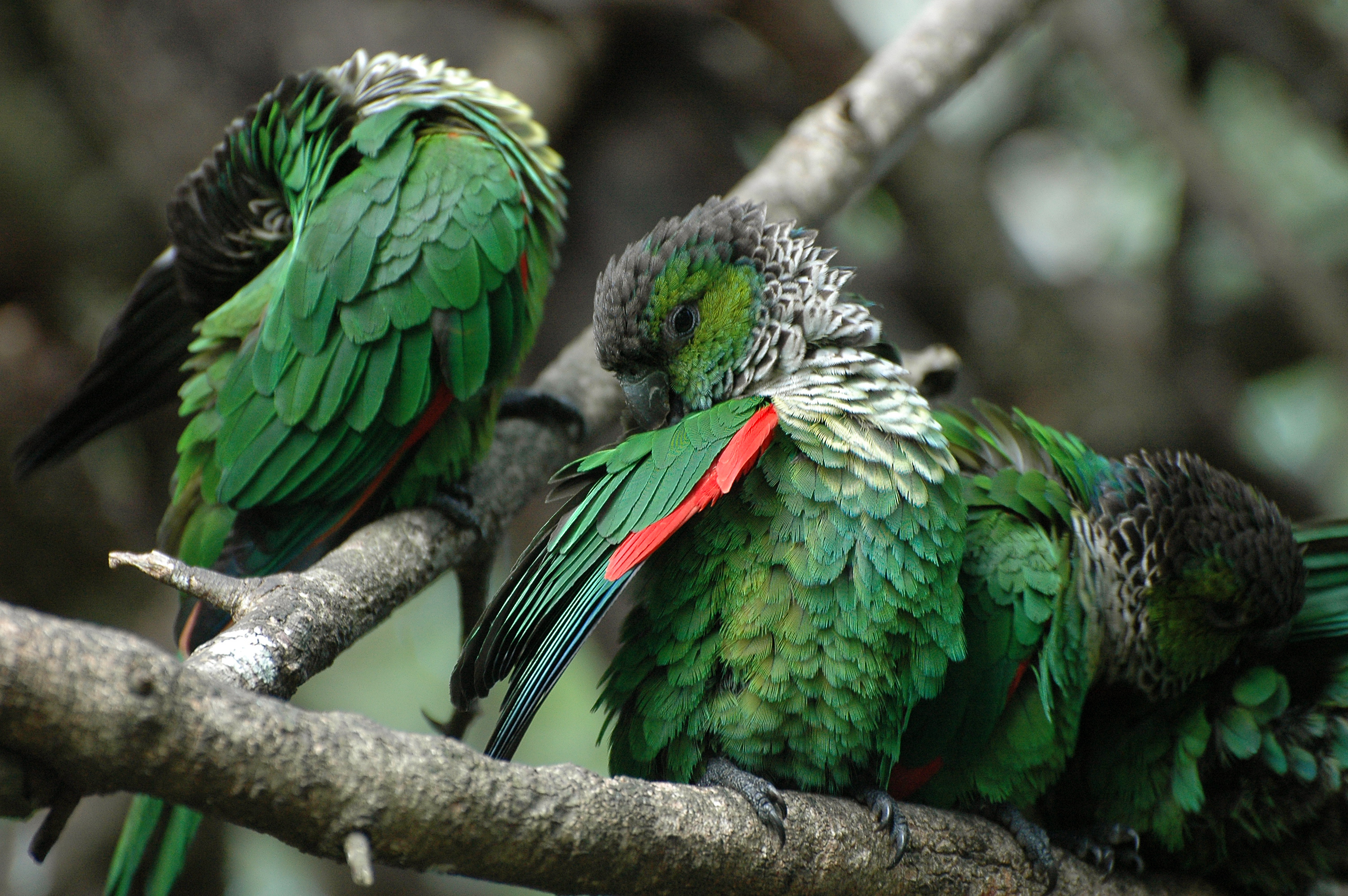
Black-capped Conure

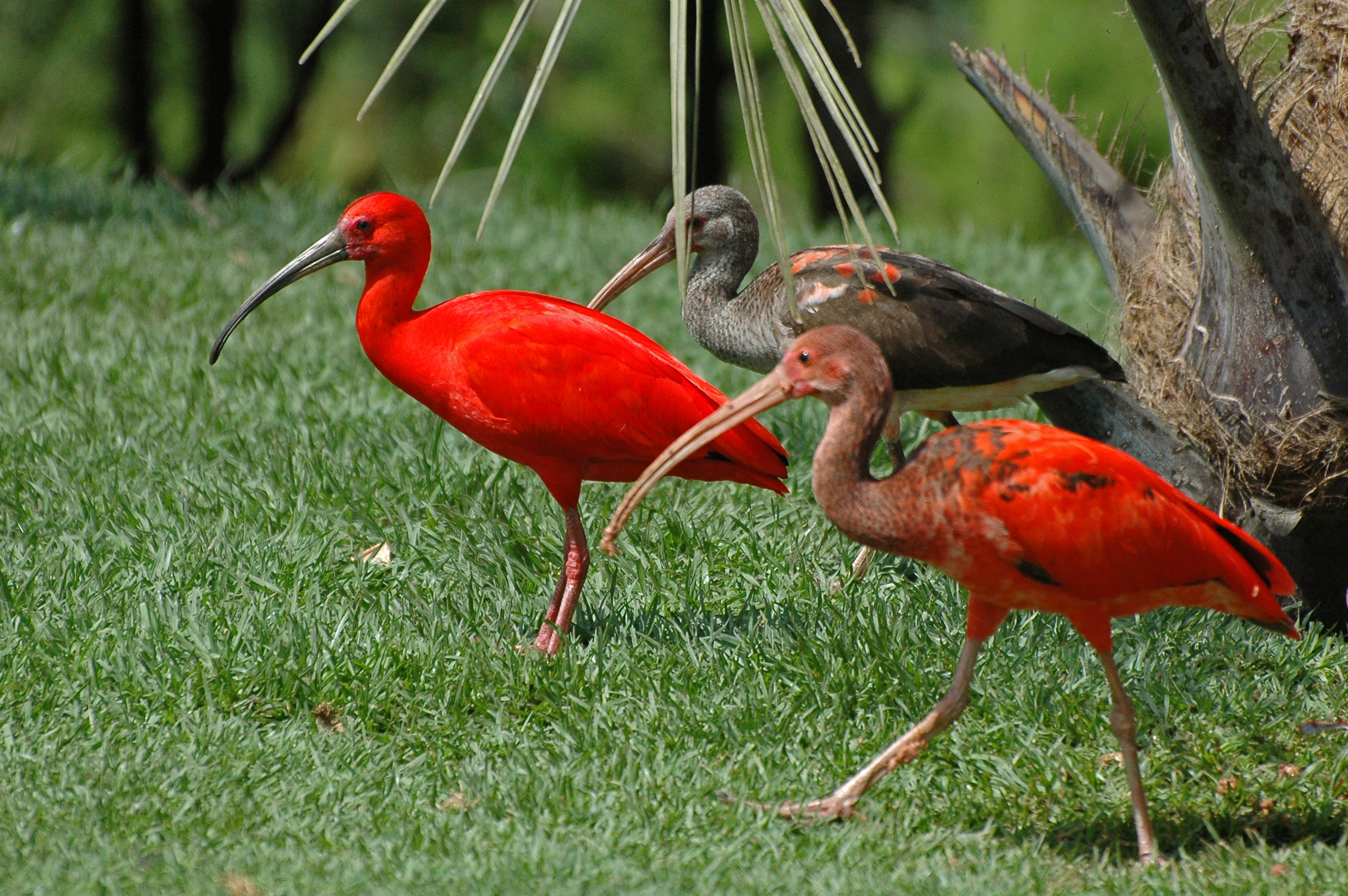
Scarlet Ibis

In 2014 the sanctuary was home to about 3500 birds representing more than 200 species.

- African grey hornbill (Tockus nasutus)
- Grey parrot (Psittacus erithacus)
- African olive pigeon (Columba arquatrix)
- African pied wagtail (Motacilla aguimp)
- African sacred ibis (Threskiornis aethiopicus)
- African Spoonbill (Platalea alba)
- Alexandrine parakeet (Psittacula eupatria)
- Greater flamingo and American flamingo (Phoenicopterus roseus and Phoenicopterus ruber)
- Asian fairy-bluebird (Irena puella)
- Bearded barbet (Lybius dubius)
- Black-capped parakeet (Pyrrhura rupicola)
- Maroon-bellied parakeet (Pyrrhura frontalis)
- Black-headed parrot (Pionites melanocephalus)
- Blue crane (Anthropoides paradiseus)
- Blue eared pheasant (Crossoptilon auritum)
- Blue-and-yellow macaw (Ara ararauna)
- Blue-fronted amazon (Amazona aestiva)
- Blue-headed parrot (Pionus menstruus)
- Bourke's parrot (Neopsephotus bourkii)
- Brown-headed parrot (Poicephalus cryptoxanthus)
- Budgerigar (Melopsittacus undulatus)
- Buffon's turaco (Tauraco persa buffoni)
- Burrowing parrot (Cyanoliseus patagonus)
- Buru red lory (Eos bornea cyanothus)
- Cape batis (batis capensis)
- Cape canary (Serinus canicollis)
- Cape cormorant (Phalacrocorax capensis)
- Cape crow (Corvus capensis)
- Cape robin-chat (Cossypha caffra)
- Cape shoveler (Anas smithii)
- Cape weaver (Ploceus capensis)
- Cape white-eye and Orange River white-eye (Zosterops virens/Zosterops pallidus)
- Chinese ring-necked pheasant (Phasianus colchicus torquatus)
- Channel-billed toucan (Ramphastos vitellinus)
- Citron-crested cockatoo (Cacatua sulphurea citrinocristata)
- Cockatiel (Nymphicus hollandicus)
- Common emerald dove (Chalcophaps indica)
- Diamond dove (Geopelia cuneata)
- Dusky lory (Pseudeos fuscata)
- Dusky-headed Conure (Aratinga weddellii)
- Eastern rosella (Platycercus eximius)
- Fork-tailed drongo (Dicrurus adsimilis)
- Golden pheasant (Chrysolophus pictus)
- Golden-breasted starling (Lamprotornis regius)
- Golden-capped parakeet (Aratinga auricapillus)
- Green pheasant (Phasianus versicolor)
- Green-backed camaroptera (Camaroptera brachyura)
- Green-naped lorikeet (Trichoglossus haematodus haematodus)
- Grey crowned crane (Balearica regulorum)
- Grey go-away-bird (Corythaixoides concolor)
- Grey-backed camaroptera (Camaroptera brevicaudata)
- Guinea turaco (Tauraco persa persa)
- Hamerkop (Scopus umbretta)
- Hartlaub's turaco (Tauraco hartlaubi)
- Helmeted guineafowl (Numida meleagris)
- Indian peafowl (Pavo cristatus)
- Indian rose-ringed parakeet (Psittacula krameri manillensis)
- Jandaya parakeet (Aratinga jandaya)
- Java sparrow (Padda oryzivora)
- Knysna turaco (Tauraco corythaix)
- Knysna warbler (Bradypterus sylvaticus)
- Knysna woodpecker (Campethera notata)
- Laughing dove (Spilopelia senegalensis)
- Laughing kookaburra (Dacelo novaeguineae)
- Lesser flamingo (Phoenicopterus minor)
- Little grebe (Tachybaptus ruficollis)
- Luzon bleeding-heart (Gallicolumba luzonica)
- Malachite sunbird (Nectarinia famosa)
- Mandarin duck (Aix galericulata)
- Masked lovebird (Agapornis personatus)
- Moluccan red lory (Eos bornea bornea)
- Monk parakeet (Myiopsitta monchus)
- Nanday parakeet (Nandayus nenday)
- Olive thrush (Turdus olivaceus)
- Olive woodpecker (Dendropicos griseocephalus)
- Orange-breasted sunbird (Anthobaphes violacea)
- Oriental pied hornbill (Anthracoceros albirostris)
- Ornate lorikeet (Trichoglossus ornatus)
- Peach-fronted parakeet (Aratinga aurea)
- Plum-headed parakeet (Psittacula cyanocephala)
- Princess parrot (Polytelis alexandrae)
- Purple-crested turaco (Tauraco porphyreolophus)
- Red-and-yellow barbet (Trachyphonus erythrocephalus)
- Red-breasted parakeet (Psittacula alexandri)
- Red-crowned parakeet (Cyanoramphus novaezelandiae)
- Red-fronted parrot (Poicephalus gulielmi)
- Red-masked parakeet (Psittacara erythrogenys)
- Red-rumped parrot (Psephotus haematonotus)
- Red-winged starling (Onychognathus morio)
- Rosy-faced lovebird (Agapornis roseicollis)
- Rüppell's parrot (Poicephalus rueppellii)
- Scaly-headed parrot (Pionus maximiliani)
- Scarlet ibis (Eudocimus ruber)
- Scarlet-fronted parakeet (Psittacara wagleri)
- Senegal parrot (Poicephalus senegalus)
- Silver pheasant (Lophura nycthemera)
- Slender-billed parakeet (Enicognathus leptorhynchus)
- Solomon Island eclectus parrot (Eclectus roratus solomonensis)
- Solomons cockatoo (Cacatua ducorpsii)
- Southern red-billed hornbill (Tockus rufirostris)
- Speckled pigeon and Rock dove (Columba guinea/Columba livia)
- Squacco heron (Ardeola ralloides)
- Sun parakeet (Aratinga solstitialis)
- Superb parrot (Polytelis swainsonii)
- Superb starling (Lamprotornis superbus)
- Swee waxbill (Coccopygia melanotis)
- Tambourine dove (Turtur tympanistria)
- Timneh parrot (Psittacus timneh)
- Triton cockatoo (Cacatua galerita triton)
- Umbrella cockatoo (Cacatua alba)
- Violet turaco (Musophaga violacea)
- Western corella (Cacatua pastinator)
- White stork (Ciconia ciconia)
- White-eyed conure (Aratinga leucophthalmus)
- Yellow-bibbed lory (Lorius chlorocercus)
- Yellow-billed hornbill (Tockus flavirostris)
- Yellow-faced myna (Mino dumontii)
- Yellow-streaked lory (Chalcopsitta scintillata)
- Zebra dove (Geopelia striata)
- Zebra finch (Taeniopygia guttata)
