= Yellow-billed hornbill =

Yellow-billed hornbill is a common name for several birds in the genus Tockus and may refer to one of the following:

- Eastern yellow-billed hornbill, Tockus flavirostris
- Southern yellow-billed hornbill, Tockus leucomelas
