= Monkeyland Primate Sanctuary =

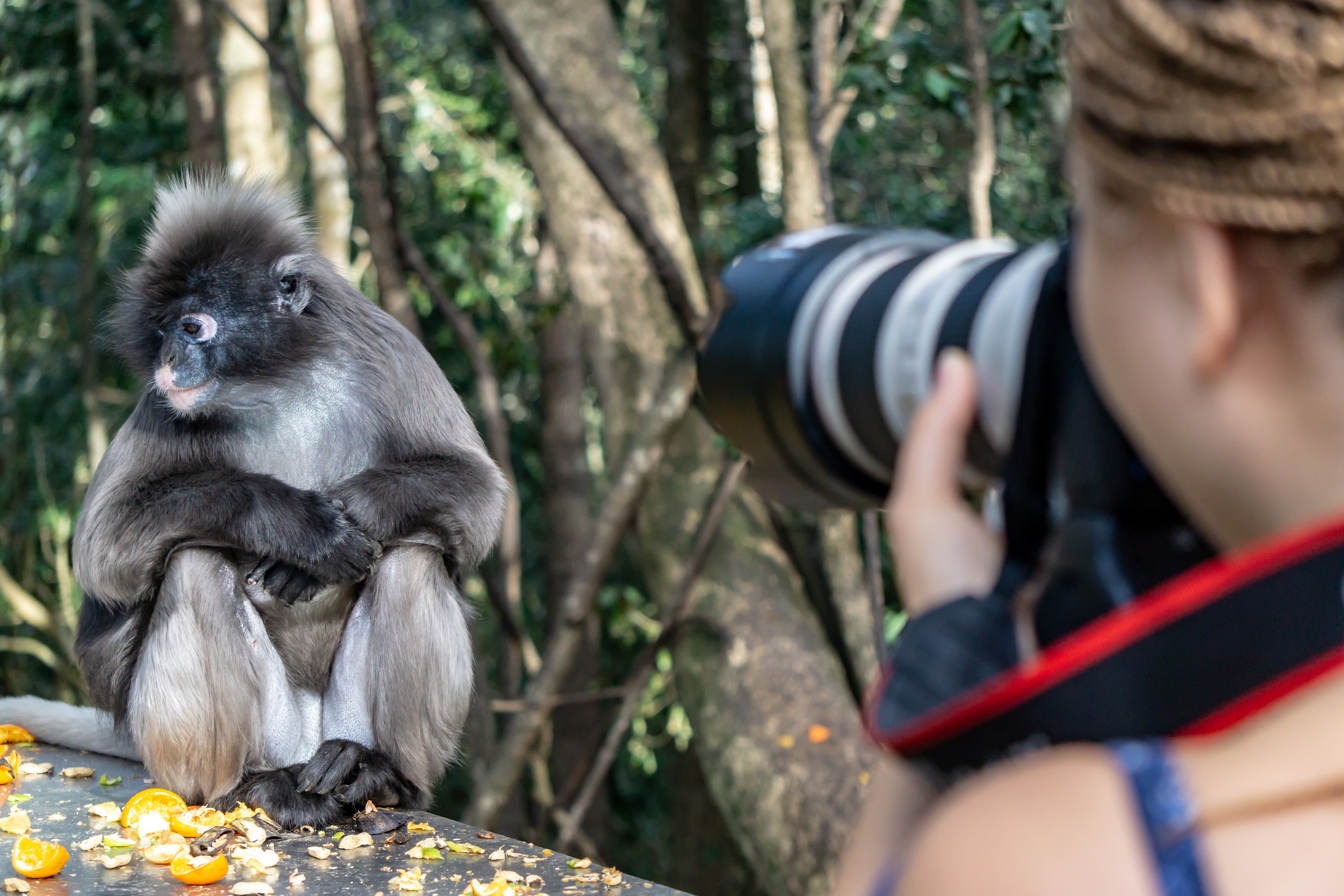
- Interactive map of Monkeyland Primate Sanctuary
- 33.963°S 23.4835°E
- Date opening: 6 April 1998
- Location: Western Cape, South Africa
- Land area: 2.3 hectares (5.7 acres)
- No. of animals: 550+
- No. of species: 9
- Website: www.monkeyland.co.za

Monkeyland is a free roaming, multi-species primate sanctuary founded in 1998 by Tony Blignaut, which is located at The Crags near Plettenberg Bay in the Western Cape, South Africa. The sanctuary covers more than 12 hectares (30 acres) of indigenous forest, with a protected greenbelt of 4 hectares (9.9 acres). Monkeyland is one of four sanctuaries managed by The South African Animal Sanctuary Alliance (SAASA), the others being Birds of Eden and Jukani Wildlife Sanctuary in Plettenberg Bay, and Monkeyland's s sister sanctuary, MonkeylandKZN near Ballito on the Dolphin Coast.

== Facilities ==
The sanctuary covers more than 12 hectares (30 acres) of indigenous forest, with a protected greenbelt of 4 hectares (9.9 acres). Primates move freely in the sanctuary and are able to enjoy a life as close to natural as possible for a captive held wild animal. Tourists can visit the sanctuary and enjoy a walk of about 1.2 kilometres (0.75 mi) on forest walkways, with a professional safari guide.

== Awards ==
As a member of SAASA Monkeyland was honoured with four major tourism awards in 2014. The four awards are namely the Lilizela Tourism Visitor Experience of the Year Award at 'Wildlife Encounters', the Skål International Sustainable Tourism Award, Overall winner of the World Responsible Tourism Award as well as the Gold Award in World Responsible Tourism in the category of 'Best Animal Welfare Initiative'. In 2019 after opening Monkeyland KZN, SAASA was again awarded the Skål International Sustainable Tourism Award for Major Tourist Attraction.

== Land ownership ==
In 2021, Monkeyland instituted a campaign that will purchase the sanctuary's property in trust, effectively giving the primates right of ownership to the land.
